= List of record labels: I–Q =

This is a list of notable record labels, starting with I–Q.

List of record labels
A–H	I–Q	R–Z	0–9

I–Q

== I ==
- I.R.S. Records
- iam8bit
- I Am Hardstyle
- I Am Other
- I Scream Records
- Iamsound
- Ice Age Entertainment
- Ice Records
- Ichiban Records
- Ici, d'ailleurs...
- Ideal Records
- Idol Records
- Ignition Records
- IHT Records
- Ill Will Records
- Illegal Art
- Illegal Musik
- Illegal Records
- Imagen Records
- Imaginary Records
- Imagine Asia
- Imago Records
- Immediate Records
- Immortal Records
- Impact (New Zealand)
- Impact Records
- Impact Records (California)
- Imperial Records (1900)
- Imperial Records (1920)
- Imperial Records (1947)
- Imperial Recordings
- Imprint Records
- Improvising Artists
- Impulse! Records
- Imputor?
- In Records (United States)
- In Records (Australia)
- In the Name Of
- In the Red Records
- In-Fidelity Recordings
- Incentive Records
- Incus Records
- Independiente
- Indestructible Record Company
- Indigo Records
- Industrial Records
- Infectious Music
- Infinity Cat Recordings
- Infinity Records
- Ingrooves
- Initial Records
- Innocent Records (UK)
- Innocent Records (Australia)
- Innova Recordings
- Inoxia Records
- Inpop Records
- Inside Recordings
- Inside Out Music
- Instant Karma
- Instant Records
- Instinct Records
- Intec Digital
- Integrity Music
- Integrity Records
- Intense Records
- International Artists
- International DeeJay Gigolo Records
- Internet Money Records
- Interphon Records
- Interscope Geffen A&M Records
- Interscope Records
- Discos Intolerancia
- Intrada Records
- Invictus Records
- Invisible Agent
- Invisible Hands Music
- Invisible Records
- inVogue Records
- Iodine Recordings
- Iona Records
- Ipecac Recordings
- Ironworks
- Irregular Records
- Isadora Records
- Island Blue Records
- The Island Def Jam Music Group
- Island Masters
- Island Records
- Island Records Australia
- Island Reggae Greats
- IST Entertainment
- It's a Wonderful World Music Group
- Italians Do It Better
- Ivy League Records
- Ivy Queen Musa Sound Corporation

== J ==
- J & S Records
- J Records
- J Storm
- J. Tune Entertainment
- J.O.B. Records
- Jackson Records
- JAD Records
- Jade Tree
- Jagjaguwar
- Jahtari
- Jamaican Gold
- Jamie Records
- Janus Records
- Jaro Medien
- Jarrah Records
- Jarring Effects
- Jasmine Records
- Jaus Records
- JAXART Records
- Jay Boy
- Jazz, Ltd.
- Jazz Man Records
- Jazzaway Records
- Jazzland Recordings
- Jazzology Records
- JCOA Records
- JDC Records
- JDub Records
- Jeepster Records
- Jellyfish Entertainment
- JEMP Records
- Jerden Records
- Jericho Beach Music
- Jester Records
- Jesuit Music Ministry
- Jet Records
- Jet Set Records
- Jewel Records (Cincinnati record label)
- Jewel Records (New York record label)
- Jewel Records (Shreveport record label)
- Jiggiri Records
- Jim Henson Records
- Jive Electro
- Jive Records
- JMJ Records
- JMT Records
- Johann's Face Records
- Johanna Kustannus
- Johnny & Associates
- Jolly Roger Records
- Josie Records
- Joyful Noise Recordings
- JSP Records
- Juana Records
- Jubilee Records
- Judd Records
- Jugoton
- Jumbo Records
- Jungle Records
- Junior Aspirin Records
- Junior Boy's Own
- Justin Time Records
- JVCKenwood Victor Entertainment
- JYP Entertainment

== K ==
- K&K Verlagsanstalt
- K Records
- K-tel
- Kahvi
- Kaifa Records
- Kairos
- Kakao Entertainment
- Kalakuta Republic
- Kalan Müzik
- Kama Sutra Records
- Kanine Records
- Kapow Records
- Kapp Records
- Kedar Records
- Keen Records
- Keith Records
- Kelp Records
- Kemado Records
- Kemosabe Records
- Kennis Music
- Kent Records
- Key Sounds Label
- Kicking Mule Records
- Kickin Records
- Kid Stuff Records
- Kiddyphone
- Kidinakorner
- Kill Rock Stars
- Kimi Records
- Kindercore Vinyl
- Kinetic Records
- King Records (Japan)
- King Records (United States)
- King Worldwide
- Kioon Music
- Kirtland Records
- Kitchen Motors
- Kitchenware Records
- Kitty Play Records
- Kitty-Yo
- Kling Klang Studio
- KMB Jazz
- KMG Records
- KMP Holdings
- Knee Deep Records
- Knitting Factory Records
- Knockout Entertainment
- Koch Entertainment
- Kokomo Records
- Kokopelli Records
- Kompakt
- KonLive Distribution
- Konichiwa Records
- Konnect Entertainment
- Kontor Records
- Konvict Muzik
- Koolarrow Records
- Korova
- Kranky
- Kreislauf
- Kscope
- Kung Fu Records
- Kvitnu

== L ==
- La Tribu
- LAB Records
- Label Fandango
- Labrador Records
- LaFace Records
- Laff Records
- Lakeside Records
- Lamon Records
- Lanor Records
- LaSalle Records
- Last Gang Records
- Last Night From Glasgow
- Latent Recordings
- Latino Buggerveil
- Launchpad Records
- Laurie Records
- Lava Records
- Leader Records (UK)
- Leaf Hound Records
- The Leaf Label
- Leathür Records
- Leedon Records
- Leeds Talk-o-Phone
- Leesta Vall
- LeFrak-Moelis Records
- Legacy Recordings
- Legion Records
- Lench Mob Records
- Lengua Armada Discos
- Lens Records
- Level Plane Records
- Lex Records
- LHI Records
- Liberation Music
- Liberation Records
- Liberty & Lament
- Liberty Music Shop Records
- Liberty Records
- Library Records
- Licking Fingers
- Lifeforce Records
- Light Organ Records
- Light Records
- Lightning Records (UK label)
- Lil' Chief Records
- Limelight Records
- Limp Records
- Lincoln Records
- Line Records
- Lingasong Records
- Linn Records
- Linus Entertainment
- Lion Music
- Lioness Records
- Lionheart Music Group
- Liquor and Poker Music
- Listenable Records
- Lithium
- Little David Records
- Little Marvel
- Little Wonder Records
- Lizard King Records
- Lo-Fidelity Records
- Lo Recordings
- Load Records
- Loaded Records
- Loca Records
- Locked On Records
- Locomotive Music
- Locust Music
- Lofton Creek Records
- Logo Records
- Lojinx
- Loma Vista Recordings
- London Recordings
- London-Sire Records
- Lonely Astronaut Records
- Lonesome Day Records
- Longhorn Records
- Loningisa
- Lookout Records
- Loöq Records
- Loose Music
- Loose Records & Music
- Losen Records
- Lost & Lonesome Recording Co.
- Lost Highway Records Australia
- Lost Map Records
- Lost Nite Records
- Lotuspike
- Loud Records
- Love Is
- Love Is My Velocity
- Love Police Records
- Love Records
- Love Renaissance
- LoveCat Music
- Lovely Music
- Loveworld Records
- Low Country Sound
- Lowercase People Records
- LTM Recordings
- Lu Pine Records
- Luaka Bop
- Lucid Records
- Lucidsamples
- Lucky Eleven Records
- Lucky Four Records
- Lucky Records
- LuckyMe
- Lujo Records
- Luke Records
- Lumiere Records
- Lusafrica
- Lynx Entertainment
- Lyric Records (Germany)
- Lyric Records (US)
- Lyric Street Records
- Lyrita
- Lyte Records

== M ==
- M3 Records
- M.A.C.E. Music
- M&G Records
- Machete Music
- Machine Shop Records
- Mad Decent
- MAD Dragon Music Group
- Madhouse Records (British record label)
- Madhouse Records (Jamaican record label)
- Madison Records
- Madison Gate Records
- Magic Bullet Records
- Magic Circle Music
- Magna Carta Records
- Magnanimous Records
- Magnatune
- Magnet Records
- Magpie Records
- Mailboat Records
- Mainstream Records
- Mainya Music
- Maison de Soul
- Majestic Record Corporation
- Majestic Records
- Major League Productions
- Major Minor Records
- Mala Records
- Malaco Records
- MAM Records
- Mamlish Records
- Mammoth Records
- Manhattan Records
- Manifesto Records
- Manifold Records
- Manimal Vinyl
- Manna Music Inc
- Manor Records
- Man's Ruin Records
- Manticore Records
- Mantra Recordings
- Manyc Records
- MapleCore Ltd.
- MapleMusic Recordings
- Maranatha! Music
- Mardi Gras Records
- Marian Records
- Mariann Grammofon
- Marina Records
- Marine Parade Records
- Market Square Records
- Marlin Records
- Marmalade Records
- Marrakesh Records
- Marriage Records
- Marsalis Music
- Mas Flow Inc.
- Mascot Label Group
- Mascot Records
- Mass Appeal Records
- mass mvmnt
- Massacre Records
- Master Records
- Masters of Hardcore
- Masterworks Broadway
- Matador Records
- Matty Grooves Records
- Mau5trap
- Mavin Records
- Maverick
- Maxi Records
- Maybach Music Group
- MBK Entertainment
- MCA Records
- MDM Recordings
- Medallion Records
- MediaPro Music
- Mediarts Records
- Mediaskare Records
- Mega Records
- Megaforce Records
- Megalith Records
- Megarock Records
- Mego
- Mello Music Group
- Melodeon Records
- Melodic Revolution Records
- Melodisc Records
- Melodiya
- Melotone Records
- Meltdown Records
- Memorandum Recordings
- Memory Lane Music Group
- More Vision
- Memphis Industries
- Menart Records
- Merciful Release
- Merck Records
- Mercury KX
- Mercury Records
- Merge Records
- Meridian Records
- Meritt Records (1925)
- Meritt Records (1979)
- Mermaid Records
- Merovingian Music
- Messenger Records
- Metal Blade Records
- Metal Mind Productions
- Metalheadz
- Metamorfosis
- Metascope Records
- Meteor Records
- MeteorCity
- MetroJazz Records
- Metroplex
- Metropolis Records (US)
- Metropolis Records (Serbia)
- MFS
- MGM Distribution
- MGM Records
- Michael Pärt Musik
- Microphone Records
- Midas Records Nashville
- Middle Pillar Presents
- Midijum Records
- Midland International Records
- Mighty Atom Records
- Mighty Force Records
- Mikroton Recordings
- Milan Records
- Milestone Records
- The Militia Group
- Mille Pattes Records
- Mille Plateaux
- Millennium Records
- Mimosa
- Minimal Wave Records
- Ministry of Sound
- Ministry of Sound Australia
- Minit Records
- Minos EMI
- Mint Records
- Minty Fresh
- Minus
- Mirage Records
- Misfits Records
- Misra Records
- Missing Link Records
- Mission Records
- Mistletone
- Mixpak Records
- MLD Entertainment
- Mnemosyne Productions
- MNRK Music Group
- MNW Music
- Mo-Da-Mu
- Mo' Hits Records
- Mo' Wax
- Mobile Fidelity Sound Lab
- Moda Records
- Mode Records
- Modern Outsider
- Modern Records (1945)
- Modern Records (1980)
- Modular Recordings
- Moist Music
- Mojo Records
- Mokum Records
- Mole Listening Pearls
- Mom + Pop Music
- Monarc Entertainment
- Monika Enterprise
- Monitor Records (New York)
- Monkeywrench Records
- Mono vs Stereo
- Monstercat
- Montalban Hotel
- Montgomery Ward Records
- Monument Records
- Moon Ska Records
- Moon Ska World
- Mooncrest Records
- Moonfog Productions
- Moonglow Records
- The Moonshine Conspiracy
- Moonshine Music
- Moonwalk Records
- Mordam Records
- Morr Music
- Morrison Records (Australia)
- Morrison Records (Seattle)
- Mosaic Records
- Moseley Shoals Records
- Moshi Moshi Records
- Mosley Music Group
- Motech Records
- Mother Records
- Mötley Records
- Motor Music
- Motown
- Mountain Apple Company
- Mountain Fever Records
- Mountain Home Records
- Mountain Records
- Move Records
- Moving Shadow
- MPS Records
- Mr Bongo Records
- Mr. Lady Records
- Mt. Fuji Records
- MTA Records
- MTM Records
- Mulatta Records
- Multiply Records
- Multitone Records
- Murder Inc. Records
- Murderecords
- Murmur
- Musart Records
- Mush Records
- Mushroom Group
- Mushroom Records (Australia)
- Mushroom Records (Canada)
- The Music Cartel
- Music Farm
- Music for Nations
- Music for Pleasure
- Music Maker
- Music of Life
- Music West Records
- Music&New
- Musica Omnia
- Musica Records
- Musica Studios
- Musical Heritage Society
- MusicMasters Records
- Disques Musicor
- Musicor Records
- Musicraft Records
- Musidisc
- Mutant League Records
- Mute Records
- Myrrh Records
- MySpace Records
- Mystic Records
- Mystic Story

== N ==
- N.E.E.T. Recordings
- N-Coded Music
- n5MD
- Nacional Records
- Nagaswara
- Naim Records
- Napalm Records
- Nappy Boy Entertainment
- Narada Productions
- Nardis Records
- Narnack Records
- Nash Icon Records
- Nashville Harbor Records & Entertainment
- Nation Records
- National Music Lovers Records
- National Recording Corporation
- National Records
- Native Language Music
- Native Records (UK)
- Native Records (Nigerian record label)
- Nature Sounds
- Navigator Records
- Naxos
- Neat Records
- Necropolis Records
- Needlejuice Records
- Nega Network
- Neighborhood Records
- Nemesis Records
- Nemperor Records
- NEMS Enterprises
- Neon Gold Records
- Neptune Records
- Nervous Records (U.K.)
- Nervous Records (US)
- netMusicZone Records
- Nettwerk
- Network 23
- Network Records
- Neurot Recordings
- Neutral Records
- Never Broke Again
- Never Fade Records
- Never Say Die Records
- New Alliance Records
- New Amsterdam Records
- New Earth Records
- New Orleans Records
- New Red Archives
- New Renaissance Records
- New West Records
- New World Records
- Newhouse Records
- Nexsound
- Next Plateau Entertainment
- Nextera
- Ngoma
- NH Media
- Nickelodeon Records
- Nicola Delita
- Niezależna Oficyna Wydawnicza CDN
- Night Slugs
- Nighthawk Records
- Nightshade Productions
- Nihilist Records
- Nilaihah Records
- Nimbus Records
- Ninja Tune
- Nippon Columbia
- Nitro Records
- Nixa Records
- NMC Music
- Nnamani Music Group
- No Fashion Records
- No Idea Records
- No Limit Records
- No Masters
- No Records
- No Remorse Records
- NoCopyrightSounds
- Nocturne Records
- Noh Poetry Records
- The Noise Company
- Noise Records
- Noisebox Records
- Nola Records
- Nonesuch Records
- Noo Trybe Records
- NorCD
- Nordic Steel
- Nordskog Records
- Norgran Records
- Northern Records
- NorthernBlues Music
- NorthSide
- Norton Records
- Not Lame Recordings
- Nothing Records
- Nova Zembla
- Novamute Records
- Novus Records
- Now-Again Records
- NPG Records
- Ntone
- NTT Publishing
- Nuclear Blast
- Nude Records
- Nukleuz
- The Numero Group
- Nuphonic
- NUX Organization

== O ==
- Obese Records
- Oblivion Records
- Octone Records
- Odd Box Records
- Odd Future Records
- OddChild Music
- Ode Records
- Odeon Records
- Odyssey Records
- Off Centaur Publications
- Og Music
- Oglio Records
- Ogopa Deejays
- Ogun Records
- Oh Boy Records
- Oi! the Boat Records
- Okeh Records
- Old Europa Cafe
- Old Homestead Records
- Oldie Blues
- Oldies-33
- Oldies-45
- Olive Grove Records
- Oliver Sudden Productions
- Olivia Records
- Om Records
- Omnivore Recordings
- On the Fiddle
- On-U Sound Records
- OnClassical
- Ondine
- One Big Spark
- One Eleven Records
- One Little Independent Records (One Little Indian Records until 2020)
- One Records (Scotland)
- One Records (Serbia)
- One Way Records
- Open Bar Entertainment
- Open Road Recordings
- Open World Entertainment
- Opera Rara
- Operaphone Records
- Ophelia Records
- Opium
- Opus Records
- Or Records
- Orange Record Label
- Orange Records (Mobile, Alabama)
- Orange Twin Records
- The Orchard
- Orchid Tapes
- Orfanato Music Group
- Orfeo
- Orfeón
- Org Music
- Organized Nature
- Origin Jazz Library
- Original Jazz Classics
- Original Sound
- Origo Sound
- Oriole Records (UK)
- Oriole Records (U.S.)
- Orion Records
- Orlando Productions
- Orpheus Music
- Osmose Productions
- Ostgut Ton
- Out of Line Music
- Outpunk
- Output Recordings
- Outside Music
- Outta Sight Records
- Ovation Records
- Overcoat Recordings
- OVO Sound
- Ovum Recordings
- Owl Studios
- Owsla
- Oxford Records
- Oxygen Music Works

== P ==
- P572
- Pablo Records
- Pacific Front Recordings
- Pacific Jazz Records
- Pagan Records
- Page One Records
- Paid in Full Entertainment
- Painted Smiles Records
- Paisley Park Records
- Palette Records
- Palm Pictures
- Palm Records
- Palo Duro Records
- Pamplin Music
- PAN
- Panart
- Pandisc Records
- Pangea Recordings
- Panhellenion Records
- Panic Button Records
- Panton Records
- Panzerfaust Records
- Paper Bag Records
- Papillon Records
- Paracadute
- Paramount Music
- Paramount Records (1917)
- Paramount Records (1969)
- Parasol Records
- Parkwood Entertainment
- Parlophone
- PARMA Recordings
- Parrot Records (various)
- Parrot Records (blues label)
- Partee Records
- Partisan Records
- Pathé Records (France)
- Pathé Records (China)
- Patuxent Music
- Paw Tracks
- PC Music
- Peacefrog Records
- Peaceville Records
- Peacock Records
- Peak Records
- Peanuts & Corn Records
- Peerless Records
- Penalty Recordings
- Pendragon Records
- Pendu Sound Recordings
- Penny Farthing Records
- Pentatone
- People Mountain People Sea
- Pepper Records
- Perfect Game Recording Co.
- Perfect Records
- Perfecto Records
- Perhaps Transparent
- Perishable Records
- Perlon
- Perspective Records
- Pete Waterman Entertainment
- Peter Pan Records
- PGLang
- PGP-RTB
- PGP-RTS
- Phantasy
- Phantom City Studios
- Phantom Limb
- Phantom Records
- Pharmacy Records
- Pharmafabrik
- Phase 4 Stereo
- Phi-Dan Records
- Philadelphia International Records
- Philips Classics Records
- Philips Records
- Philles Records
- Phillips International Records
- Philly Groove Records
- Philly Jazz
- Philo Records (folk)
- Philo Records (rhythm & blues)
- Phono-Cut Record Company
- Phonogenic Records
- Phonogram Inc.
- Photo Finish Records
- Pi Recordings
- PIAS Group
- PIAS Recordings
- Pickwick Records
- Piedmont Records
- Pilz
- Pina Records
- Pinecastle Records
- Pink and Black Records
- Pinnacle Entertainment (United Kingdom)
- Pipeline Music
- Pivotal Rockordings
- Placid Casual
- Plainisphare
- Plaka Pilipino
- Plan 9 Records
- Plan-It-X Records
- Planet Dog Records
- Planet Mu
- Planet Pimp Records
- Plant Life Records
- Plantation Records
- Plasma Records
- Plastic Raygun
- Plastiq Musiq
- Platform Records
- Platina Records
- Platipus Records
- Playbill Records
- Playboy Records
- Playground Music Scandinavia
- Playhouse Records
- Playing With Sound
- Playmaker Music
- Playtone
- Pledis Entertainment
- Plug Research
- Plus 8
- Pluto Records
- PMR Records
- Pneuma Recordings
- Poe Boy Entertainment
- POF Music
- Pointblank Records
- Point Music
- Polar Music
- Polaris Entertainment
- Polen Records
- Polo Grounds Music
- Polskie Nagrania Muza
- Polydor Records
- PolyEast Records
- Polygon Records
- PolyGram
- Polymorph Records
- Polyvinyl Record Co.
- Pompeii Records
- Ponca Jazz Records
- Pony Canyon
- Popfrenzy
- Poptones
- Pork Recordings
- Portrait Records
- Posh Boy Records
- Positiva Records
- Positive Tone
- Positron! Records
- Post Records
- The Post War Blues
- Postcard Records
- Posthuman Records
- Power It Up Records
- Pravda Records
- Prawn Song Records
- Precision Talent
- Prelude Records
- President Records
- Pressure Sounds
- Prestige Records
- Prikosnovénie
- Primary Music
- Priority Records
- Priory Records
- Prism Records
- Private Music
- Private Stock Records
- PRMD Music
- Probe Plus
- Probe Records
- Procrastinate! Music Traitors
- Production House Records
- Produttori Associati
- Profane Existence
- Profile Records
- Profound Lore Records
- Project 3 Records
- Project Blowed
- Projekt Records
- Proper Music Distribution
- Proper Records
- Propeller Recordings
- Propeller Records (Auckland)
- Propeller Records (Boston)
- Prophecy Productions
- Prophet Entertainment
- Prosthetic Records
- Prosto
- Protest Records
- Provident Label Group
- Provogue Records
- PS Classics
- P.S.F. Records
- Psycho (UK)
- Psycho+Logical-Records
- Psychomania Records
- Psychopathic Records
- Psychout Records
- El Puerto Records
- Punk Core Records
- Purchase Records
- Pure Noise
- Pure Steel Records
- Puritan Records
- Purple Feather Records
- Purple Music Switzerland
- Purple Records
- Purple Ribbon Records
- Putumayo World Music
- Pye International Records
- Pye Records
- Pyramid Gang Records

== Q ==
- Q Division Records
- Q-Productions
- QRS Music Technologies
- Discos Qualiton
- Qualiton Records
- Quality Control Music
- Quality Records
- Quango Music Group
- Quannum Projects
- Quarterstick Records
- Queen Bee Entertainment
- Quiet Storm Records
- Quote Unquote Records
- Qwest Records

== See also ==
- List of electronic music record labels
- List of independent UK record labels
- List of Bangladeshi record labels
