= List of electronic music record labels =

This is a list of notable electronic music record labels:

== 0–9 ==
- 3 Beat Records
- 12k
- 430 West Records

== A–C ==
- A Different Drum
- Ad Noiseam
- Adjunct Audio
- Alex Tronic Records
- Alfa Matrix
- Alien8
- All Around the World
- All Saints Records
- Almighty Records
- Ambush Reality
- Amorfon
- A-Musik
- Anjunabeats
- Anticipate Recordings
- Apollo Recordings
- Arcola
- Armada Music
- Aropa Records
- Artoffact Records
- Astralwerks
- Asthmatic Kitty
- Asylum Records
- ATIC Records
- Atlantic Jaxx
- Audio Dregs
- Azuli Records
- Basic Channel
- Beatservice Records
- Because Music
- Bedrock Records
- Benbecula Records
- Big Beat Records (American record label)
- Big Life
- Biohazzard Records
- Bitbird
- Black Butter Records
- Black Hole Recordings
- Blue Room Released
- Bonzai Records
- BPitch Control
- Brainfeeder
- Breakbeat Kaos
- Chalice
- Circus Records
- City Centre Offices
- Cleopatra Records
- Cocoon Recordings
- Compuphonic
- Cooking Vinyl
- Crammed Discs
- Cuneiform Records

== D–F ==
- Darkest Labyrinth
- Darla Records
- Deconstruction Records
- Defected
- Dependent Records
- Deviant Records
- DFA Records
- Dial Records
- Digital Hardcore Recordings
- Dim Mak Records
- Dimension
- Disciple Records
- Disques Hushush
- Distinctive Records
- Dreyfus Records
- DSFA Records
- Durtro
- East West (Human League)
- Ed Banger Records
- Eenie Meenie Records
- Elefant Records
- Emperor Norton Records
- Em:t Records
- Energy Rekords
- Epic Records
- Erased Tapes
- Ersatz Audio
- ESL Music
- Eye Q
- Fat Cat Records
- Fatal Recordings
- FAX +49-69/450464
- F Communications
- FFRR Records
- Finger Lickin' Records
- Fitamin Un
- FiXT Music
- Flashover Recordings
- Fly Eye Records
- Fool's Gold Records
- Fringe Product
- Future Classic
- Future House Music

== G–L ==
- Garuda
- Geffen Records
- Get Physical Music
- Ghost Box Music
- Ghostly International
- Glasgow Underground Recordings
- Good Looking Records
- Gooom Disques
- Grand Central Records
- Gravitas Recordings
- Hallucination Recordings
- Harthouse
- Heavenly Recordings
- Hed Kandi
- Hefty Records
- Hippos in Tanks
- Hospital Records
- Hotflush Recordings
- Hyperdub
- Hyperium Records
- Illegal Art
- Imputor?
- Incentive Records
- Innova Recordings
- Instant Karma
- Instinct Records
- Intec Digital
- International DeeJay Gigolo Records
- Italians Do It Better
- Jahtari
- Jarring Effects
- Jive Electro
- Junior Boy's Own
- Kannibalen Records
- Kickin Records
- Kinetic Records
- Kitsuné Musique
- Kitty-Yo
- KLF Communications
- Kompakt Records
- Kontor Records
- Kranky
- Kreislauf
- Lo Recordings
- Luaka Bop
- LuckyMe
- Legion Records

== M–O ==
- Mau5trap
- Macro
- Mad Decent
- Magnanimous Records
- Magnatune
- Marian Records
- Marine Parade Records
- Mass mvmnt
- Masters of Hardcore
- Mego
- Merck Records
- Metal Blade Records
- Metalheadz
- Metropolis Records
- Mille Plateaux
- Ministry of Sound
- Minus
- Mo' Wax
- Mode Records
- Modular Recordings
- Mole Listening Pearls
- Monstercat
- Moonshine Music
- Morr Music
- Moving Shadow
- Mush Records
- Musicor Records
- Mute
- n5MD
- Nardis Records
- Network Records
- Never Say Die Records
- Nexsound
- Newhouse Records
- Nextera
- Night Slugs
- Nilaihah Records
- Ninja Tune
- NoCopyrightSounds
- Noh Poetry Records
- Nothing Records
- Nova Zembla
- Novamute Records
- Ntone
- Nukleuz
- Off Beat
- Old Europa Cafe
- Om Records
- On-U Sound Records
- One Little Independent Records (One Little Indian Records until 2020)
- Ophelia Records
- Or Records
- Origo Sound
- Organized Nature
- Ostgut Ton
- Out of Line Music
- Owsla

== P–S ==
- Pacific Front Recordings
- Pangea Recordings
- PC Music
- Pendragon Records
- Perfecto Records
- Perlon
- Phantasy Sound
- Planet Mu
- Plastic Raygun
- Plastiq Musiq
- Platipus Records
- Play It Again Sam
- Plug Research
- Plus 8
- POF Music
- Pork Recordings
- Positiva Records
- Positron! Records
- President Records
- Prikosnovénie
- PRMD Music
- Psy-Harmonics
- Purple Music Switzerland
- R&S Records
- Radikal Records
- Ragged Flag
- Ram Records
- Raster-Noton
- React Music Limited
- Reinforced Records
- Reflective Records
- Renaissance
- Rephlex Records
- Resist Music
- Revealed Recordings
- Rinse Recordings
- Rocket Girl
- Rob's House Records
- Rotterdam Records
- Rotters Golf Club
- Roulé
- Rune Grammofon
- Sacred Bones
- Samadhi Sound
- Saw Recordings
- Scantraxx
- Section 44 Records
- Seed Records
- Several Reasons
- Sheffield Tunes
- Shitkatapult
- Sigma Editions
- Sinnbus
- Skam Records
- Skint Records
- Sky Records
- Smalltown Supersound
- Smash The House
- Soleilmoon
- Soma Quality Recordings
- Some Bizzare Records
- Sonar Kollektiv
- Spectral Sound
- Spinnin' Deep
- Spinnin' Records
- Spirit Zone Records
- Steel Tiger Records
- Stmpd Rcrds
- Studio !K7
- Subconscious Communications
- Subplate Records
- Suburban Base
- Sweat it Out

== T–Z ==
- Ten12 Records
- Text Records
- Thinner
- Third Mind Records
- Threshold House
- Thrill Jockey Records
- Thrive Records
- Tidy Trax
- Tigerbeat6
- Tigersushi Records
- Time Unlimited
- Tino Corp.
- Toast Hawaii
- Too Pure
- Touch Music
- Transmission Communications
- Traum Schallplatten
- Tresor
- Tribe Records
- Tru Thoughts
- Twisted Records (UK)
- Twisted Records (US)
- Ugly Nephew Records
- UKF Music
- Ultimae Records
- Ultra Records
- Unidisc Music Inc.
- Union City Recordings
- Utopia Records
- V/Vm Test Records
- Vandit
- Vendlus Records
- Victory Records
- Visage Records
- Visible Noise
- Vision Quest Records
- Voices of Wonder
- Volition Records
- Wall of Sound
- Warp Records
- Wax Trax! Records
- Werk Discs
- West End Records
- Why Not Records
- Work It Baby
- Work Records
- WOLV Records
- WTII Records
- XL Recordings
- Yoshitoshi Recordings
- Young formerly Young Turks from 2006 - April 2021
- Zoth Ommog Records
- ZYX Music

== See also ==
- List of record labels
- List of independent UK record labels
