= Genka =

Estonian rapper

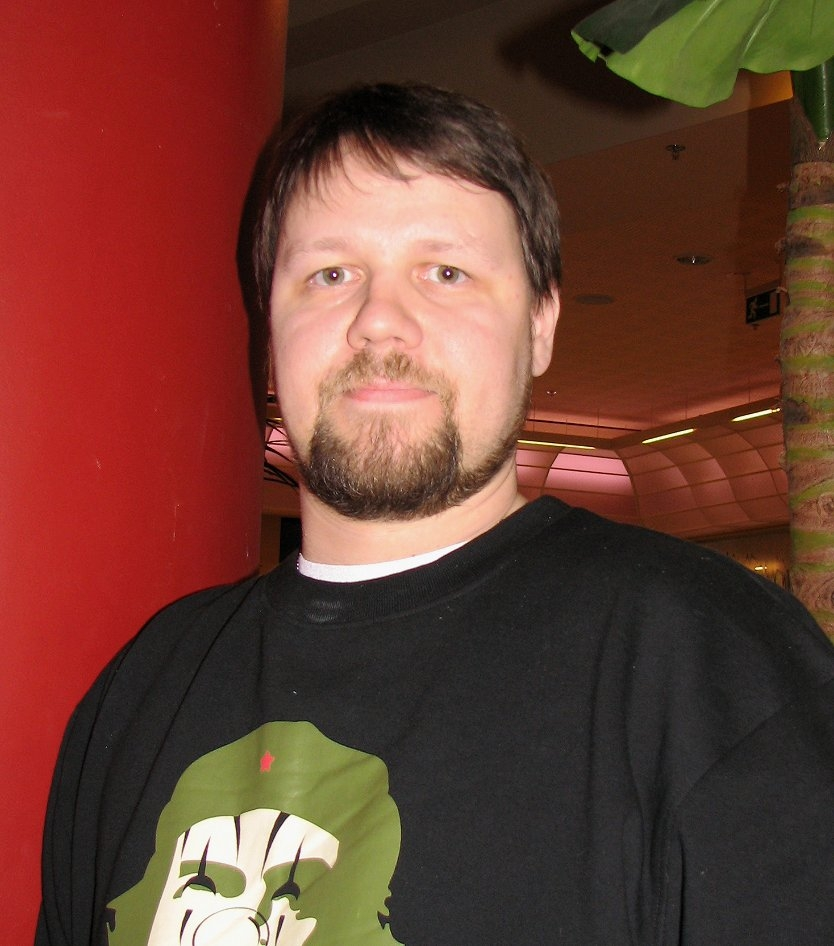
- G-Enka in 2011.

Background information
- Also known as: Genka
- Born: Henry Kõrvits; December 30, 1974 (age 51)
- Origin: Tallinn, then part of Estonian SSR, Soviet Union
- Genres: Hip hop Rap
- Occupations: Rapper, producer
- Years active: 1996 - present
- Label: Legendaarne Metsakutsu

Henry Kõrvits (born 30 December 1974 in Tallinn), better known by his stagename Genka, is an Estonian rapper, record producer and actor.

Henry Kõrvits' father is musician Harry Kõrvits and his grandfather was composer and musicologist Harri Kõrvits. He began rapping in 1996 along with Revo and DJ Paul Oja, who was Genka's schoolmate. Together they started a band called Toe Tag. Their first album The Real Kuhnja Homophobes was released next year. In 1998, Genka and Revo joined another Estonian rap group, A-Rühm, and Toe Tag went on vacation. Also Genka started making his own solo songs. The most famous hit was "Tallinn", which was rapped along with Droopy in 2001. During the same year Toe Tag came back together and started a big Estonian tour. In 2004, Toe Tag released their second studio album Legendaarne (Legendary), which consisted of 18 songs. The most famous songs from the album were "Legendaarne" and "Pankrot" (Bankruptcy). In 2006, Genka and A-Rühm released their new album Leegion which had 23 songs. The most famous songs from this album were "Palmisaar" (Palm Island) and "Tugitooli Gangster" (Armchair Gangster).

Genka and DJ Paul Oja started their own record company, Legendaarne Records. Also Genka and A-Rühm were the warm-up performers for 50 Cent on his 2007 Europe promo tour for the Curtis album in Tallinn.
