= Lyric Records =

Lyric Records may refer to:

- Lyric Records (Germany), a German record label
- Lyric Records (US), an American record label
