= Heldur =

Estonian male given name

- Gender: Male
- Language: Estonian
- Name day: 11 October

Origin
- Region of origin: Estonia

Heldur is an Estonian-language male given name.

People named Heldur include:

- Heldur Jõgioja (1936–2010), Estonian musician, composer, writer, journalist
- Heldur Niit (1928–2010), Estonian folklorist, literary scholar and editor
