= Toe Tag =

Toe Tag may refer to:

- Toe tag, a tag typically attached to a dead person in a morgue
- Toe Tag (Estonian band), a hip hop group from Tallinn, Estonia
- "Toe Tags" (CSI), an episode of CSI
