= In Records =

In Records may refer to:

- In Records (United States), a record label started in 1964
- In Records (Australia), an Australian record label of the 1960s
