= Magnanimous Records =

American independent record label

- Founded: 2000
- Founder: Curt Seiss; Daniele Seiss
- Genre: Atmospheric, experimental, ambient
- Country of origin: U.S.
- Location: Takoma Park, Maryland
- Official website: www.magnanimous.org

Magnanimous Records is an independent record label based in Takoma Park, Maryland. Founded in 2000, the artist-run label specializes in atmospheric and experimental music.

== History ==
Magnanimous Records was founded in Shepherdstown, West Virginia in 2001 by Curt Seiss and Daniele Seiss. The label was formed to provide a platform for local musicians specializing in modern atmospheric music, as most local venues catered primarily to Appalachian and bluegrass musicians. The label soon signed around a dozen ambient and atmospheric musicians, and later moved to Takoma Park, Maryland.

The label's first compilation in 2004 received a glowing review from Left off the Dial, which wrote "While indie-pop culture appropriates the IDM underground to make frequently saccharine sing-alongs, it is good to know that young, talented musicians continue to produce intelligent, experimental electronic sounds. Fans...will appreciate the drifting tones and haunted quality of the Magnanimous artists."

== Roster ==
- moljebka pvlse
- Paradigm9
- Aaron Lennox
- Brain Ballet
- Skinny
- Mode7
- Polyphasic
- Michael Winter
- LIGO
- Element Kuuda
- ophibre
- Lykaion Eclipse
- Mandible Chatter
- Ourson
- David Tagg

== Discography ==
No.	Artist	Title	Year
MAG001	paradigm9	The Halo Effect	2003
MAG002			
MAG003	Various	M1: A Magnanimous Compilation	2004
MAG004	Seiss	Drone Lender	2003
MAG006	paradigm9	Flaming Guns of the Purple Sage soundtrack	2004
MAG007	paradigm9	Live at the Lost Dog	2004
MAG008	Brain Ballet	Aquarium of the Deep Sea	2004
MAG009	Mode7	Night Echoes	2004
MAG010	Aaron Lennox	Sibilance	2005
MAG011	Various	M2: Reconstructions	2005
MAG012	Polyphasic	Petit Somme	2005
MAG013	MAO II	Klee	2007
MAG014	Aaron Lennox	Heliopause03	2007
MAG015	Polyphasic	See Plan	2007
MAG016	Element Kuuda	Le Village	2007
MAG017	Lykaion Eclipse	Mesa	2007
MAG018	David Tagg	Cold Spring Harbor	2009
MAG019	Ophibre	Mesmer	2008
MAG020	Ourson	Oth	2008
MAG021	Mandible Chatter	Grace	2008
MAG022	Michael Winter	Recursive Stall	2009
MAG023	Polyphasic	Multiphasic	
MAG024	Polyphasic	The Map is Not the Territory	
MAG025	Moljebka Pvlse	Kaikv	2011

Source: Discogs.com (updated July 31, 2013)

== See also ==
- List of electronic music record labels
