= Invisible Agent (record label) =

Record label

- Founded: 2000
- Founder: Warren Daly; Donard McCabe
- Genre: Electro; Electronica; Techno; Electronic; IDM; Drum'n'bass
- Country of origin: Ireland
- Location: Dublin (2000-)
- Official website: http://invisibleagent.com/

Invisible Agent is a long-standing Irish record label, founded in Dublin in 2000.

Founded by Warren Daly and Donard McCabe the label has released music from such notable artists as Decal, Chymera, Eomac, Ryan Van Winkle, Corrugated Tunnel, and Ikeaboy. Remix artists include renowned Electro producer Sir Real, Techno legend David Tarrida, Ambient artists Porya Hatami and Cousin Silas

== Artists past and present ==
- Audio Mainline
- Arche
- Chymera
- Corrugated Tunnel
- Danseizure
- Decal
- David Tarrida
- Def Disko
- Ebauche
- Edwin James
- Eomac
- Ikeaboy
- John Dalton
- Ketsa
- LMD64
- Love Rhino
- Ryan Van Winkle
- Swarm Intelligence a.k.a. Simon Hayes
- The Northern Hemisphere
- Toaster
- vTek
- Warren Daly
- Undermine
- 2BiT
