= Toe Tag (Estonian band) =

Estonian musical group

- Origin: Kalamaja, Tallinn, Estonia
- Genres: hip hop
- Years active: 1996-2011
- Labels: MFM Records; Legendaarne Records
- Members: G-Enka; DJ Paul Oja
- Past members: Revo
- Website: www.toetagmusic.com

Toe Tag is an Estonian hip hop group originally from Kalamaja, Tallinn. It consists of rappers G-Enka (Henry Kõrvits) and DJ Paul Oja. Toe Tag was established in 1996. In August 2011, rapper Revo (Revo Jõgisalu) died from skin cancer.

Awards and achievements
Preceded by Chalice	Estonian Music Awards; Best Hip-Hop/R&B artist 2010	Succeeded by –
