= Sadie Chandler Cole =

American singer (1865–1941)

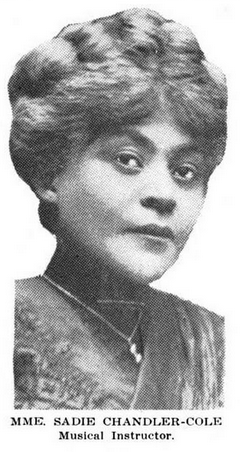
Sadie Chandler Cole, from a 1919 publication.

Sadie Chandler Cole (1865 – 1941) was an American singer, music educator, and civil rights activist based in southern California.

== Early life ==
Sadie Chandler was born in Cincinnati, Ohio, the daughter of Abraham Washington Chandler and Sarah Hatfield Chandler. Her parents were involved in the Underground Railroad and helped found a Baptist church in Cincinnati.

== Career ==
Sadie Chandler was a member of the Fisk Jubilee Singers as a young woman. In 1903, she sang at a Los Angeles scholarship fundraiser for Vada Watson to attend the University of Southern California. In later adulthood, she directed choruses in jubilee-style singing.

As early as 1908, she was active in black political organizing in California; that year, she attended a rally of the Los Angeles branch of the national Negro American Political League, speaking on "The Part Women Have Played in the Settlement of the World's Great Problems". She was active in the Los Angeles chapter of the NAACP when it began in 1913, serving as the chapter's first vice-president, and attended national conferences representing the chapter. She broke dishes and removed a "Negroes Not Wanted" sign from a lunchstand on Broadway in Los Angeles in the 1920s, after she was refused service, then egregiously overcharged. The police arrived at the scene and sided with Cole. She also helped to desegregate the beaches in Los Angeles County. After the closure of Bruce's Beach, a beach resort for black swimmers, she participated in a 1927 "swim in" at a whites-only beach in Manhattan Beach, California.

In 1926, she sang at the National Association of Colored Women's Clubs special memorial service for Margaret Murray Washington. She was one of four women (also including Hettie B. Tilghman) selected by Mary McLeod Bethune to represent the national association at the Pan-Pacific Conference in Hawaii in 1928.

== Personal life ==
Sadie Chandler married Thomas A. Cole, who became a deputy in the Los Angeles County Sheriff's Department. They lived in Detroit, Michigan before they moved to Los Angeles, California with their daughters, Florence and Eunice. Her daughter Florence Cole Talbert became a professional soprano singer and voice teacher.

Sadie Chandler Cole died in 1941, aged 76 years. Her gravesite is in Angelus Rosedale Cemetery in Los Angeles, where she has been portrayed in "living history" tours in recent years.
