= Revo Jõgisalu =

Estonian rapper

Revo
- Born: Revo Jõgisalu; 9 July 1976
- Origin: Tallinn, Estonia
- Died: 30 August 2011 (aged 35)
- Genres: Hip hop Rap
- Occupation: Rapper
- Years active: 1996–2011
- Label: Legendaarne
- Formerly of: Toe Tag, A-Rühm

Revo (birth name Revo Jõgisalu; 9 July 1976 – 30 August 2011) was an Estonian rapper. He was one of the founding members of Estonian most influential hip-hop groups Toe Tag and A-Rühm.

== Death ==
On 30 August 2011, aged 35, Revo Jõgisalu died from melanoma.
