= Florence Cole Talbert =

American opera singer

Florence Cole Talbert-McCleave
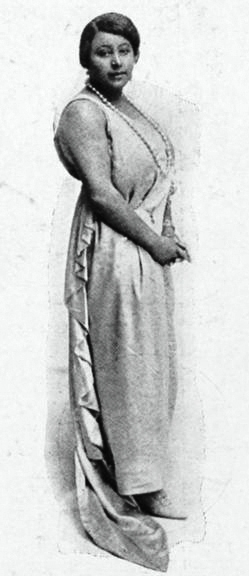
- Florence Cole Talbert in 1925

Background information
- Born: Florence Cole; June 17, 1890; Detroit, Michigan
- Died: April 3, 1961 (aged 70) Memphis, Tennessee
- Genre: Opera
- Occupations: Singer, composer, music educator
- Years active: 1910s-1930s

Florence Cole Talbert-McCleave (born Florence Cole, June 17, 1890 – April 3, 1961), also known as Madame Florence Cole-Talbert, was an American operatic soprano, music educator, and musician. Called "The First Lady in Grand Opera" by the National Negro Opera Guild, she was one of the first African American women and black opera artists performing abroad who received success and critical acclaim in classical and operatic music in the 20th century. Through her career as a singer, a music educator, and an active member of the National Association of Negro Musicians, she became a legendary figure within the African American music community, also earning the titles of "Queen of the Concert Stage" and "Our Divine Florence."

Most notably, she is credited with being the first African American woman to play the title role of Verdi's Aida in a European staging of the opera. Talbert was also one of the first African-American classical artists to record commercially.

After retirement, Talbert became a music educator. She taught in historically black colleges and universities such as Fisk University, Tuskegee University, and Rust College. Notably, she is credited with encouraging Marion Anderson, one of the most celebrated opera singers of the 20th century, to pursue a career in classical music. During this time, she also composed the words to Delta Sigma Theta's official hymn.

Talbert died in Memphis at the age of 70. Although she did not receive the same fame as black female artists who came after her, such as Marian Anderson and Leontyne Price, her work in the 1910s and 1920s was instrumental in paving a path for black musicians in the classical world.

== Early life and training ==
Florence Cole was born on June 17, 1890, in Detroit, Michigan, to a family with deep roots in music and the performing arts. Her mother, Sadie Chandler Cole, was a mezzo-soprano and civil rights activist, who had gained considerable recognition as a member of the Fisk Jubilee Singers. Her father was a basso and was well known as a dramatic reader. In an interview in 1930, Talbert further revealed that her maternal grandmother, Mrs. Hatfield Chandler, was a patron of music who had founded the first "colored" Baptist choir in Cincinnati, Ohio.

Florence began her musical training as a pianist when she was six years old. This training continued even when her family moved to Los Angeles, California, in 1898, when she was eight years old. By the time she was twelve, she had already started accompanying for her mother's concerts. When she was a teenager, she started attending the Los Angeles High School as the first black student to do so. There, she studied music theory with ancient and modern languages and participated in the school's music program, gaining accolades for her performances as a pianist.

She decided to become a singer, however, when she first watched a production of Aida at age fifteen. "I was impressed by the opera as nothing had ever moved me before. I sat breathlessly watching the artists, and as the opera progressed, a desire (an impossible desire, so it seemed at the time) took possession of me. I wanted to sing the title role in Aida," she said in an interview with Ruby Goodwin. Consequently, she joined her school's glee club, becoming the first black soloist to join it. By this time, she had already begun her voice training under Gloria Mayne Windsor, a soprano who performed globally. Notably, she accompanied Madam Emma Azalia Hackley, a renowned black soprano and founder of the Colored Women's League, at a concert in Los Angeles at age sixteen. Seeing her talent, Hackley encouraged her to continue her voice training. As a result, she continued her voice training under mentors like Oscar Saenger, John B. Miller, and Herman Devries. Attesting to her talent, Saenger was quoted saying, "her voice [was] a beautiful soprano, which she [used] with consummate skill," in Negro Musicians and Their Music by Maud Cuney Hare, an African American musician and musicologist. She also performed with Eusebio Concialdi, an Italian baritone, who encouraged her to specifically pursue studying Italian operatic roles. Due to her talent, she was selected as the soloist for commencement exercises at her school, becoming the first black student to partake in a high school commencement program in LA.

She began her college education at the University of Southern California College of Music, where she specialized in oratorio.

== Career ==
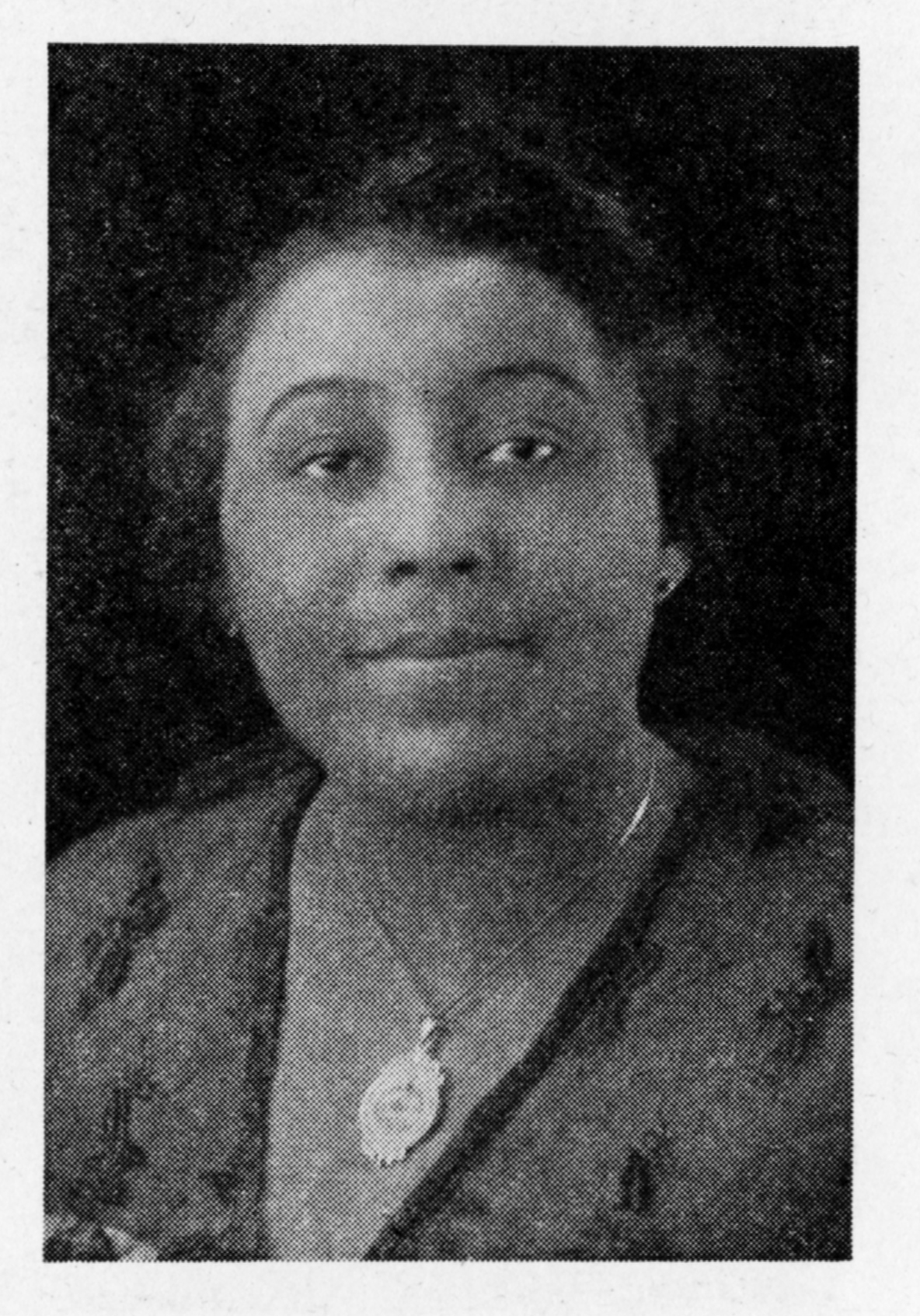
Florence Cole Talbert

In 1915, Florence left college during her senior year and started touring with Hahn's Jubilee Singers all over the U.S. and Canada. Here she also met her first husband, Wendell P. Talbert, a Hann's pianist at the time. Through her work with Hahn's Jubilee Singers, she also had the opportunity to interact with eminent musicians like Noble Sissle. By the end of 1915, she had separated from her husband, but she kept his last name for professional purposes.

In 1916, she left the Jubilee Singers and started making solo performances. Simultaneously, she moved to Chicago, Illinois, to attend the Chicago Musical College. From early on, she started appearing in student programs, becoming the first black student to appear in the school's programs. In June 1916, she graduated, having completed her music education in one year instead of the typical four. At the graduation ceremony, she received the highest honor, the Diamond Medal, for outstanding achievement in vocal studies and for the highest average in her graduating class. That same year, she was featured on the cover of Half Century Magazine, which began publication in August 1916 in Chicago, in recognition of her work.

=== Debut and early days ===
After graduation, she started appearing in concerts in Chicago, Detroit, and Los Angeles. In 1916, she was a soloist with the Chicago Symphony Orchestra. Within that same year on April 16, she made her New York recital debut at Aeolian Hall. Then from 1918 to 1925, she toured across the U.S., receiving critical acclaim in local newspapers and contemporary publications such as The Chicago Defender and the Competitor. In fact, the Competitor called her "An Idol of the Concert Stage."

While touring, she continued training under Oscar Saenger and shared recital programs with renowned artists such Daisey Tapley, a contralto from New York who also sponsored Cole Talbert's New York debut and represented the soprano for a while. One noteworthy collaboration was when she performed Handel's Messiah with the Howard University Choral Society under the direction of Lulu Vere Childers in 1919. Reviewing her performance, a critic from The Washington Times wrote that Talbert's "voice was pure and high and held appealing expression that was exquisite at times, then full of the sunlight of spring, or again told this gripping tale with pathos and sympathy."

=== Repertoire and recordings ===
Talbert made recordings very early in her career, starting in 1919. In fact she was one of the first few black classical artists to be recorded, unlike many of her peers whose work was not recorded due to record companies' hesitance to record black classical artists. Her repertoire was extensive and versatile—covering styles from opera arias, songs of contemporary composers like William Grant Still, to spirituals arranged by composers such as Hall Johnson. She recorded with the following labels and recording companies:

==== Broome Special Phonograph Label ====
In 1919, George W. Broome of the Broome Special Phonograph label approached her to record with them. She recorded three songs for them, including "Nobody Knows the Trouble I've Seen" and "Villanelle."

==== Black Swan Records ====
She also recorded with Black Swan Records—the first widely distributed label to be owned and operated by and marketed to African Americans—thus becoming the first classical musician to record with them. In 1921, she recorded at least four titles for them, and in 1923, she recorded three titles with them, including "Bell Song" from Lakmé, "Il Bacio" by Luigi Arditi, and "The Last Rose of Summer" from Martha by Friedrich von Flotow.

==== Paramount Records ====
In 1924, she recorded two additional titles for Paramount Records. These included "Homing" by Teresa del Riego and "Swiss Echo Song" by Karl Eckert.

=== Aida and Europe ===
From 1925 to 1927, Talbert studied music in Europe—specifically, Italy and France—like many artists of the times. Before she left, The Cosmopolitan Arts Society of Los Angeles organized a farewell reception on June 22, 1925. In Rome, she studied with Delia Valeri and Vito Carnevale at the Summer School for Americans at the Villa d'Este and in Milan, she studied with Julian Quezada. During her two years in Europe, some of her other teachers included Sylvo Puccetti, Mario Bellini, and Marcel Picheran of Opera Comique.

One of the breakthrough moments in Talbert's career came in March 1927. It was her debut at the Teatro Communale in Cosenza, Italy in the title role of Giuseppe Verdi's Aida. She is credited with being the first black woman to play Aida with an all white, European professional company to receive critical acclaim and success, that too, in Europe. In fact, she received critical acclaim in Paris, London, and Rome. Due to this performance, she was invited to be a member of the Facista Group of Lyric Artists. Furthermore, she was even offered a five-year contract to sing as Aida in the opera, however, she had to refuse the offer since she needed to return to the U.S. with her mother. After three performances of Aida, Talbert continued doing concerts in Rome, Southern Italy, and Paris, which were also received with critical acclaim.

=== Career in the U.S. ===
When Talbert returned to the U.S. in 1927, she continued her recitals by touring extensively across the U.S. Although she received recognition for her performances in the African American music community, she had difficulty finding opportunities in opera in the U.S. As she toured, she also started taking on voice students to mentor.

When she was on a tour in Tennessee, she met her second husband, Benjamin F. McCleave, eventually marrying him in 1930.

=== Retirement and mentoring ===
In 1930, Talbert decided to focus on teaching. She accepted her first teaching position at Bishop College in Marshall, Texas, where she was the first black director of music. In the future, she headed the voice department at the Tuskegee Institute and the Fisk University. Simultaneously, she also opened her own studio to teach students privately in Memphis, Tennessee, where she eventually settled.

During her career as a music educator, she mentored several voice artists, who went on to become renowned classical musicians in their own right. These students included:

- Vera Little: she was a mezzo-soprano, who debuted as Carmen at the State Opera House in Berlin in 1957.
- Marian Anderson: she was a world renowned contralto, who became the first black artist to perform at the Metropolitan Opera in New York. Talbert is credited with encouraging a young Anderson to pursue a career in singing. She even hosted a benefit concert to raise money for a scholarship for Anderson's training.
- La Julia Rhea: she was an operatic soprano, who is known to be the first black artist to have been granted an audition by the Metropolitan Opera. Rhea was Talbert's protege, who like Talbert, became one of the early black musicians to play Aida.

During this period of her career, she was also instrumental in bringing world-famous artists such as Leontyne Price to sing at LeMoyne–Owen College, so that young black musicians in Memphis could have the opportunity to learn about and from top class artists.

== Community involvement ==
Throughout her career, Talbert was an active member of the African American community in addition to her contributions as a performer, musician, and music educator. In 1919, she became an active member of the National Association of Negro Musicians. As a member, she sang at annual conferences as well as served as chairperson of the Conference of Artists and the Voice Conference. She also co-founded the Memphis Music Association with Mrs. T.H. Watkins. Additionally, she was an active member and co-founder of the Christian Science Society Church in Memphis.

As the honorary member of the Delta Sigma Theta sorority, a historically black sorority, Talbert composed its national hymn.

== Critical acclaim and accolades ==
Talbert was widely celebrated within the African American musical community for her talent, receiving titles such as "Queen of the Concert Stage." An example of the critical acclaim she received in the U.S. was when she performed in Houston in 1930 with well known local pianist, Ernestine Covington. Critics in the Informer wrote the following about her performance, "[it was] the greatest operatic soprano the race has ever produced" and called her "among the greatest singers the world has ever known." So loved was she in the Los Angeles community, she also gained the title of "Our Divine Florence."

On June 25, 1953, the National Negro Opera Guild, founded by Mary Cardwell Dawson,—another celebrated opera singer—awarded Talbert with a Certificate of Merit, naming her "The First Lady of Grand Opera."

== Legacy ==
Opera Memphis recently announced the McCleave Project. It includes the McCleave Fellowship for singers, directors, and coaches of color as a way to continue the legacy of Talbert. Further, through conversations, free showings of The Telephone, and other initiatives, it aims to start dialogues about how Opera Memphis can better engage with communities of color in Memphis and the mid-South to diversify their audience.
