= Stephan Said =

American musician

Stephan Said ستيفن سعيد
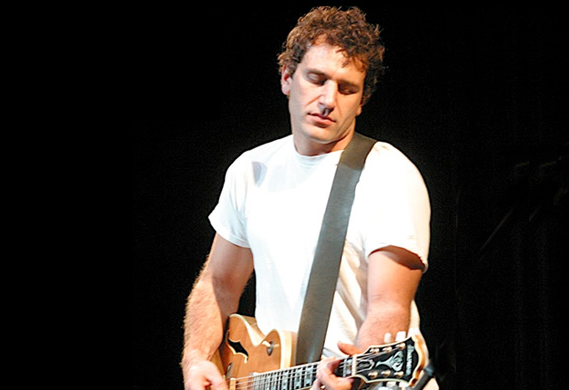
- Stephan Said

Background information
- Also known as: Stephan Smith
- Born: May 30, 1968 (age 58); Cleveland, Ohio, U.S
- Origin: Cleveland, Ohio
- Genres: Pop, hip-hop, rock and world folk music
- Occupations: Singer-songwriter, rapper, writer, and global activist
- Label: Rounder records
- Website: Official website

Stephan Othman Said (Arabic: ستيفن سعيد) (born May 30, 1968), aka Stephan Smith, is an American singer-songwriter, rapper, writer, and global activist. He hosts borderless, a docuseries about people on the front lines of change, produced by difrent:, Inc. where he travels the world, meeting people through music and discovering stories of courage and creativity.

His musical style bridges pop, hip-hop, rock and world folk music in a border-breaking sound of unity. His lyrics advocate global equality, social justice and reconciliation and cited for reinventing social-activist music for the Internet generation. Said is fluent in English, French and German and also sings in Arabic, Spanish, Hebrew, Hungarian, and other languages. He is the founder of difrent: a platform for music for social change.

== Musical career and personal life ==
=== Early life ===
Said was born in Cleveland, Ohio to Mohammad Said, a Muslim Iraqi physicist and Monika Smith, a Christian pianist and women's rights organizer from Vienna, Austria. His name is drawn from German (Stephan meaning voice/Greek honor/crown) and Arabic (Othman, meaning chosen one; and Said meaning happy or enlightened). He has three older siblings: Leila, Rob and Nadja. Shortly after his birth, the family moved to the Appalachian country of Western Pennsylvania. When Stephan was two years old, his parents divorced; his mother married Frank Gutowski, a former Jesuit priest, and Stephan grew up as Steve Gutowski. The children all studied music from an early age; Stephan took up the piano at the age of three and the violin at the age of four. The family home was a meeting ground for people of all religions, ethnic, economic, and political backgrounds.

The family moved to Richmond, Virginia where he attended St. Christopher's School and also became an Eagle Scout. The summer of his junior year, he attended the Governor's School for the Gifted and received an invitation for early entry into the Jazz Program at Virginia Commonwealth University, where he briefly joined a quintet under the direction of Ellis Marsalis at age 17. After less than one semester he left to tour with Alternative/Punk bands Always August and The Office Ladies of SST Records, and played with groups including Firehose, Sonic Youth, Dinosaur Jr., The Meat Puppets and other Alternative and Punk bands.

In 1993 at the invitation of The Fugs, Stephan performed several Appalachian folk songs at the Naropa Institute in Boulder, Colorado where he came to the notice of beat poet Allen Ginsberg and producer Hal Wilner. Ginsberg urged Stephan to move to New York City, where he became his mentor.

=== Early career (1994–1997) ===
Said moved to New York City's Lower East Side where he built singing-songs of social change and helped start several old-time, bluegrass and Irish traditional music sessions. He recorded and appeared with the rock group Ween, Rufus Wainwright, played the fiddler in a video for Leonard Cohen's "Dance me to the end of love", and became a fixture at demonstrations for human rights, independent media, housing rights, and environmental issues, scoring underground hits with songs like "It Rose From The Dead" for the squatter and community garden movements. Allen Ginsberg and folk legend Pete Seeger became Stephan's mentors and The Village Voice called him "the heir apparent to Woody Guthrie". As major label interest in his career grew, Stephan was told repeatedly by industry executives that he could "never have a career in the United States with an Arabic name". With great difficulty, and much to the dismay of colleagues like Jeff Buckley he stopped performing under his given name around 1997, and, started using his mother's maiden name and performed as "Stephan Smith".

=== The Ballad of Abner Louima (1997) ===
Said first broke into national press in 1997 with the anti-police brutality single "The Ballad of Abner Louima" with Patti Smith on background vocals. With less than 100 copies printed, the ballad charted in the CMJ Music charts, aired on the Howard Stern Show, and thrust Stephan into the folk music limelight. In a New York Times full-length feature article folk legend Pete Seeger compared the rapid spread of Stephan's song, accomplished without the backing of any label, to that of the civil rights anthem "We shall overcome."

=== Now's the Time (Rounder, 1999) ===
Said's solo acoustic debut album, Now's The Time was released on Rounder records in June 1999, and Stephan intended it as a call to action for the 1999 Seattle demonstrations against the WTO, which he helped organize, and where he performed, appearing in Deep Dish TV's documentary Showdown in Seattle. Stephan toured extensively in support of "Now's the Time", opening for Bob Dylan, Paul Simon, and fellow Virginian Dave Matthews. Though the album draws equally on folk, rap, r&b and rock, the music industry received it mainly as folk, often with specific reference to Woody Guthrie.

=== Proclaiming Jubilee, Universal Hobo (2000–2001) ===
Produced by Grammy winning producer John Alagia, Dave Matthews, John Mayer and Jason Mraz, Proclaiming Jubilee was a genre-crossing pop album aimed at bringing an urgent call for a more just and equal global economy directly to a wide audience on the new millennium. The album met with opposition at record labels for its lyrics about social change, and was never released. In response, on April 16, 2000, the date of the Washington A16 protests against the IMF and World Bank, Stephan released A16, a 2 -song EP from the album with artwork by friend, award-winning graphic artist Eric Drooker, as free mp3's on his web site and on the Independent Media Center; the label responded by dropping his contract. The album Proclaiming Jubilee was scheduled to be released at last in May 2011.

=== The Bell (2002) ===
With the support of friends, Said founded his own record label, Universal Hobo, in 2002 and had another major hit: The Bell. An update of the old folk ballad "The False Knight Upon the Road", it was recorded with members of Spearhead and Ween, and Pete Seeger on spoken vocals.Accompanied by a video from filmmaker Kurt St. Thomas featuring live footage of anti-war demonstrations around the world, it was released publicly as an mp3 on Stephan's web site on September 11, 2002, the first anniversary of the attacks on the World Trade Center. The song rapidly went viral on the pre-YouTube web. At home, the New York Times called it "one of the first major songs to oppose the war in Iraq". Guerilla News Network called it the "anti-war anthem of our generation". The song enhanced Smith's reputation as one of the most outspoken American musicians. Re-released in February 2003 as an EP with liner notes by historian Howard Zinn and cover versions of the song by DJ Spooky and others, it was covered by Dave Matthews during his 2003 solo tour and topped the NPR All Songs Considered list of songs on the war. Following a performance at Joe's Pub in New York City, Billboard Magazine wrote "With his rough-hewn good looks and mythic songwriting, Smith is the closest thing to this generation's Woody Guthrie."

=== Touring to build global movement ===
The Bell pioneered the use of mp3's and online music videos for social change. But, in the context of the war on terror and following the infamous radio ban and CD burning of the Dixie Chicks surrounding their anti-war stance artists and managers could not afford the risk of having Stephan, outspoken Iraqi/Arab American with the biggest antiwar hit, open for them. Nearly impossible to get gigs and or retain a booking agent, Stephan started the non-profit Universal Hobo Touring, with the help of non-profit education professional Amy Hufnagel. Universal Hobo Touring organized tours of performances at benefits and conferences for peace and justice groups and student organizations helping to build the global justice movement.

=== New World Worder, Protest Records (2003) ===
In April 2003 Said released a full-length solo album, New World Worder. He also collaborated with Thurston Moore of Sonic Youth and Zach de la Rocha of Rage Against the Machine to launch Protest Records, a web archive of contemporary protest songs, for which one of the album's songs, Business, was released on opening day.

=== Slash and Burn (Artemis, 2004) ===
Said then signed with industry legend Danny Goldberg at Artemis Records. His first album backed by a full band, Slash and Burn (2004) merged pop, rock, country, and rap, combining love songs with political poetry, which garnered critical acclaim. Several songs, such as the singles "Taking Aim," and "In The Air" criticize not only war and inequality but the role of the music industry in censoring protest and playing culprit to global inequality. The single "You Ain't A Cowboy," a send up of President Bush, was released to with TrueMajority as an MP3. Billboard Magazine called it the first MP3 ever released for a political action committee – resulting in hundreds of thousands of downloads in the first two weeks. The album also includes a ballad in the name of Lee Kyung Hae, the South Korean farmer and organizer who died at the 2003 World Trade Organization demonstrations in Cancun. Mexico. The lyrics to this song were used as the prologue to the Peter Rosset book Food Is Different: Why the WTO Should Get out of Agriculture.

During this time, Said earned his Masters in International Affairs at The New School and began publishing opinion articles in the media on globalization, social change, protest music, and censorship. When Neil Young said that he felt compelled to release his 2006 album Living with War because young protest singers weren't picking up the torch, Smith published articles on the censorship of socially engaged music in mainstream music in the San Francisco Chronicle and in The Progressive, stating "Where's the voice of protest? It's in MTV's trash can. Where are today's protest singers? They're on the "don't add" list at corporate radio stations, where they've increasingly been placed since FCC deregulation paved the way for the monopolization of the industry." He also became a spokesperson for the Electronic Frontier Foundation, and Freemusic, the World Forum on Music and Censorship, and attended the Third Freemuse Conference in Istanbul in 2008.

=== difrent (2007–2010) ===
In 2007 Said returned to the studio to begin work on a new album, and social change initiative, difrent. Produced by Grammy winner Hal Willner, the album brings together an all-star cast of musicians in support of Stephan's message of global equality and peace, including jazz horn legends Lenny Pickett, Howard Johnson, Art Baron and Earl Gardner as well as Cindy Blackman, Rob Clores, Jane Scarpantoni, Kevin Hunter, George Mitchell, and Yousif Sheronick. He formally announced his plans to release the album under his given name, Stephan Said.

== Discography ==
=== Albums ===
- September 2011 – difrent – Stephan Said
- June 2005 – Slash and Burn – Stephan Smith Band (Artemis Records)
- April 2003 – New World Worder – Stephan Smith (Universal Hobo/ Synchronic)
- September 2002 – The Bell single and video, internet release
- 2001- Proclaiming Jubilee, unreleased
- June 1999 – Now's the Time – Stephan Smith (Rounder)

=== EPs ===
- February 2003 – The Bellwith Pete Seeger, DJ Spooky, Tara Nevins (Universal Hobo/Synchronic)
- April 2000 – A16- 2 song EP (Universal Hobo)
- 1998 The Blank EP – Stephan Smith, featuring Patti Smith

=== Singles ===
- 2004 – World to Come – Stephan Smith
- 2005 – Lee Kyung Hae – Stephan Smith
- 2003 – Business
- 2002 – The Bell – Stephan Smith, Pete Seeger, Dean Ween, Mary Harris
- 1997 – Ballad of Abner Louima – Stephan Smith, background vocals by Patti Smith

=== Various appearances ===
- 2004 – Wichita Vortex Sutra, Allen Ginsberg, Artemis Records
- 2002 – Cornerstone Sampler
- 1994 – Chocolate and Cheese, Ween
- 1997 – The Mollusk, Ween

=== Film/video ===
- 2010- difrent – Stephan Said
- 2006 – The Peace Patriots- Turning Tide Productions, with Steve Earle, Ani DiFranco, Saul Williams and others
- 2000 – Showdown in Seattle: 5 Days That Shook the WTO
- 1995 – Dance Me To The End of Love – Leonard Cohen, directed by Mark Pellington

== See also ==
- Folk-rock
