= Jane Martin =

American dramatist

Jane Martin is the pen name of a playwright who has been active from 1981 to the present, whose real identity remains unknown. Martin's plays include Anton in Show Business, Back Story, Beauty, Coup/Clucks, Cementville, Criminal Hearts, Flaming Guns of the Purple Sage, Vital Signs, Keely and Du and Talking With...

Martin's Keely and Du won the 1994 American Theater Critics Association New Play Award and was a finalist for the 1994 Pulitzer Prize.

Martin has been a longtime collaborator of former Actors Theatre of Louisville artistic director Jon Jory, who has directed the premieres of all of Martin's plays and serves as Martin's occasional spokesman. For this reason, Martin is often speculated to be Jory himself, or a collaboration between Jory and his wife, playwright Marcia Dixcy. Jory has refused to divulge any information about Martin, other than that they are a native of Kentucky, and that "whoever writes these plays feels that they would be unable to write them" if their identity were revealed.

Other theories about Martin's identity include former Actors Theatre of Louisville executive director Alexander Speer, former Actors Theatre literary manager Michael Bigelow Dixon, and former intern Kyle John Schmidt.

== Publications ==
- With Michael Bigelow Dixon: Jane Martin Collected Plays. Volume II, 1996–2001. Contemporary playwrights series. [Lyme, NH]: Smith and Kraus, 2001. ISBN 978-1-57525-272-8.
