= Wen Talbert =

American musician

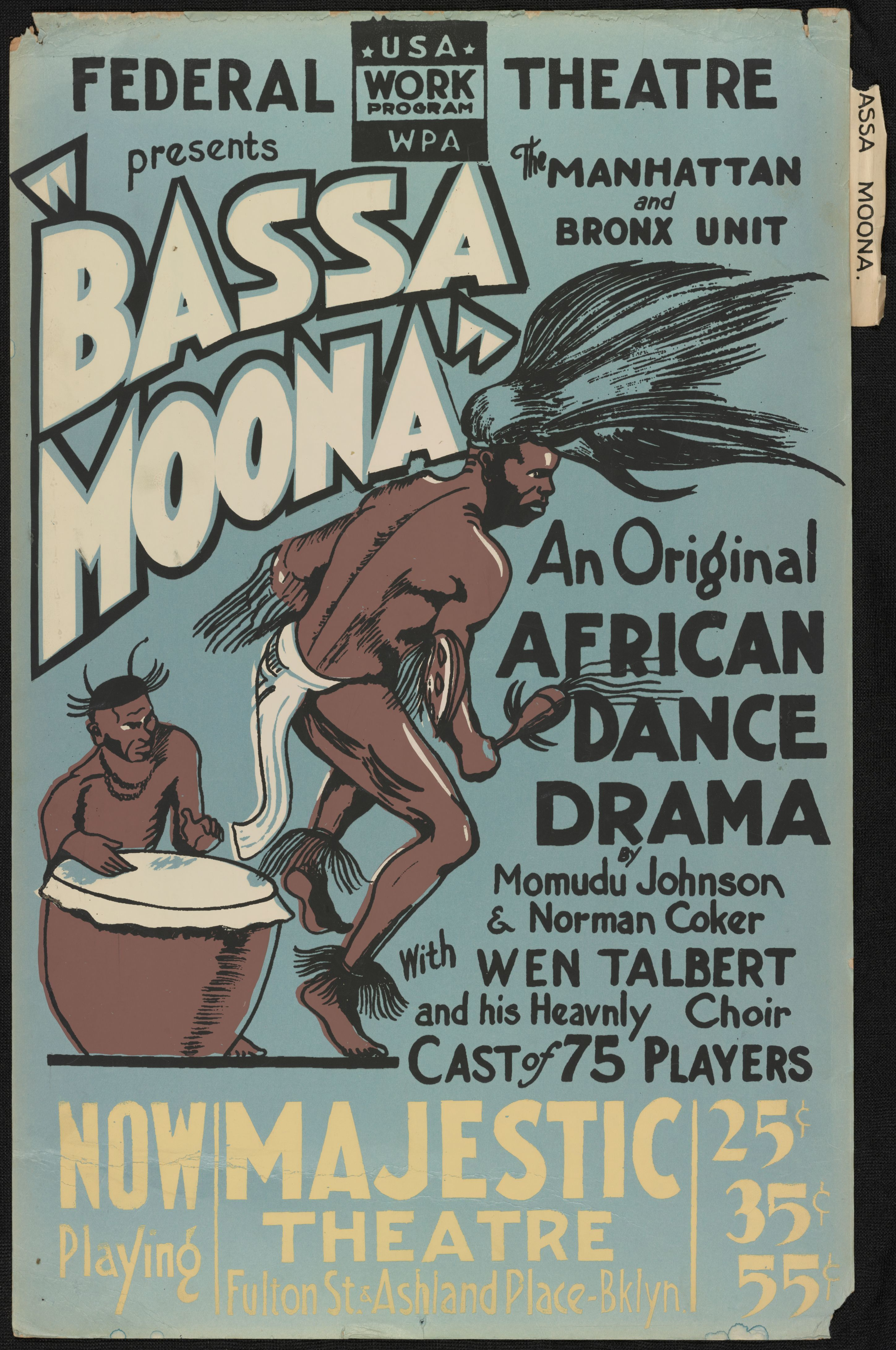
Poster for Bassa Moona (1936), which featured Wen Talbert's orchestra.

Wendell P. Talbert (died 1950), better known as Wen Talbert and sometimes performing as the Sultan of Jazz, was an American pianist, cellist, and jazz bandleader.

Talbert attended Wilberforce University and Oberlin Conservatory of Music, the latter for seven years. Early in his career, Talbert was a member of the Four Harmony Kings, a vocal group that performed in the Broadway musical Shuffle Along (1921). He later led a band called Wen Talbert's Chocolate Fiends; (Note: Or "friends". The name is rendered both ways. See, e.g., "Talbert Returns to Loew". Billboard. March 10, 1928. p. 14.) he was playing vaudeville shows with the Fiends as of 1926, when they appeared at the Pantages Theatre in San Francisco. During the 1920s, he recorded with Rosa Henderson and Lethia Hill.

In the 1930s, Talbert led the Negro Chorus of the Federal Theatre Project, which performed in several Federal Theatre productions including Bassa Moona and How Long Brethren? (1937), a dance by Helen Tamiris. During World War II, he worked as a musical director of the United Service Organizations.

Talbert was briefly married to Florence Cole Talbert; they were separated as of 1916. He died in 1950.

== Sources ==
- Brooks, Tim (February 24, 2004). Lost Sounds: Blacks and the Birth of the Recording Industry, 1890–1919. Urbana, Illinois: University of Illinois Press. ISBN 978-0-252-02850-2.
