= Mimosa (record label) =

UK record label

Mimosa was a 1920s United Kingdom record label that issued small (5½ - 6 inch) gramophone records aimed primarily at children.

Mimosa began in 1921 with a series of 5½ inch records. This continued until 1926 when a separate series of 6 inch records became available; the label was discontinued in 1930.

The label was owned by The Crystalate Gramophone Record Manufacturing Company Ltd., which also manufactured Imperial records. Some Mimosa records contained edited versions of recordings already issued on the Imperial label - this was also the case with Mimosa's sister label Kiddyphone.

As with Vocalion's Little Marvel label, Mimosa records were sold exclusively in UK Woolworth's chain stores, at a retail price of 6d (sixpence).

== See also ==
- List of record labels
- Kiddyphone
