= Several Reasons =

German record label

Several Reasons Recordings
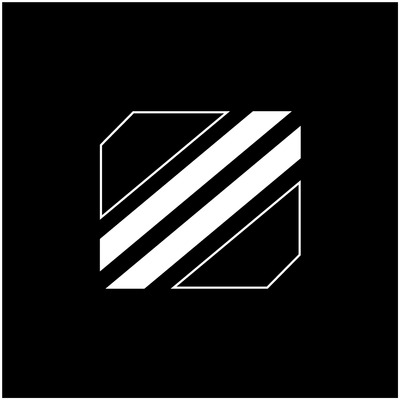
- Founded: December 2012
- Founder: Alfeo Pier, Christos Erotocritou and Max Vassiades
- Genre: Techno, dub techno, electronica
- Country of origin: Germany / United Kingdom
- Location: Berlin / London
- Official website: http://www.severalreasons.net

Several Reasons Recordings is a record label / performance projects management based in Berlin, Germany, in collaboration with London, Italy and Cyprus. Founded in 2012, it is owned and managed by Alfeo Pier (Dubit), Christos Erotocritou and Max Vassiades (mynude).

Whilst mainly focused on vinyl & digital releases the label is also a platform for creativity with emphasis on audio / visual installations and performance arts as well as projects spanning from custom VST / software plugins to bespoke hardware controllers.

== Label roster ==
=== Artists ===
- Dubit
- Scalameriya
- SpunOff
- Mynude
- Deam
- Alhek

=== Remixers ===
- Dadub
- Ness
- Eomac
- Myler
- Giorgio Gigli

== See also ==
- List of record labels
- List of electronic music record labels
