= Kyria Koula =

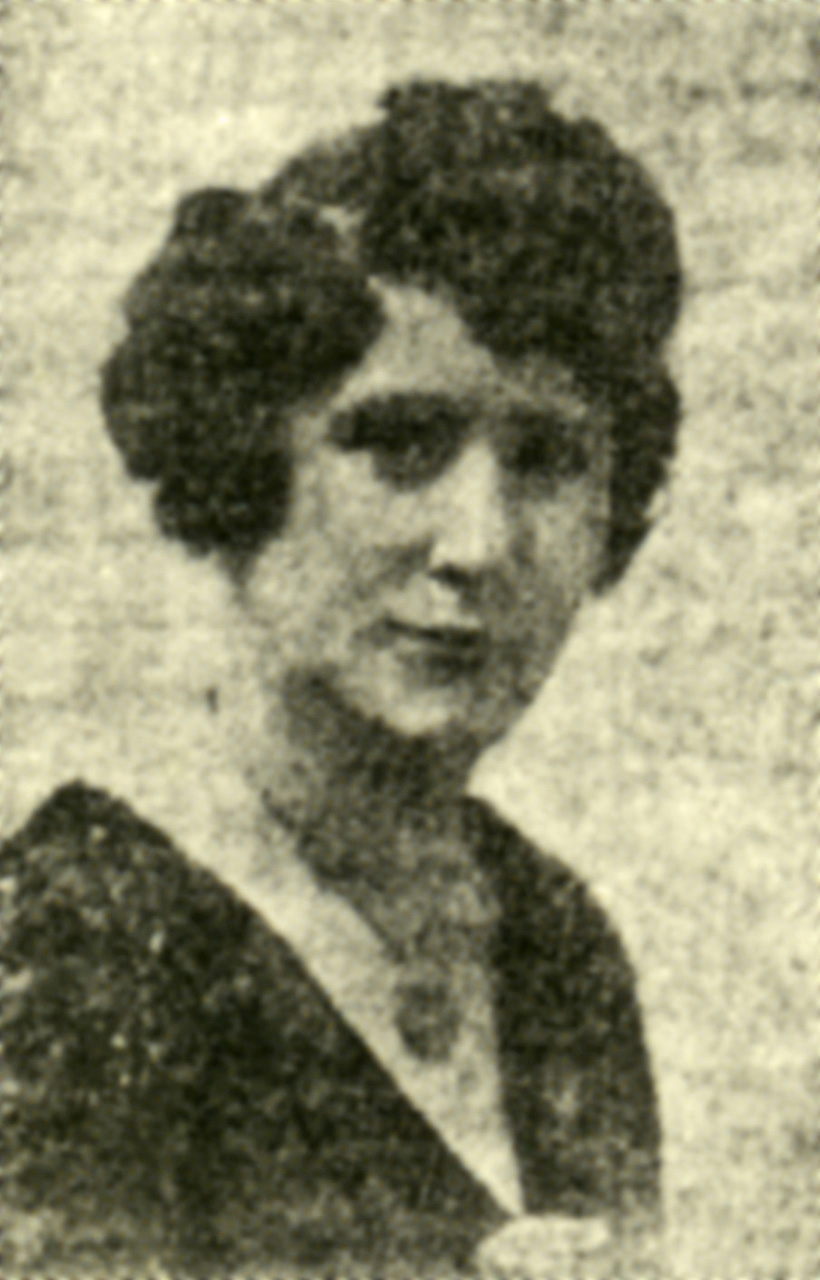
- Kyria Koula In 1920s

Background information
- Born: Kyriaki Giortzi Antonopoulou; May 21, 1878; Constantinople, Ottoman Empire
- Origin: Greece
- Died: October 11, 1954 (aged 76) New York City, U.S.
- Genres: Greek folk music, Turkish folk music, Rebetiko
- Occupation: Singer
- Years active: 1916–1950
- Labels: Columbia Records, Orpheum Records, Panhellenion Records, Victor Records, Panhellenic Records

Kyriaki Giortzi Antonopoulou, also known as Κα Κούλα or Madam Coula, (May 21, 1878 - October 11, 1954), was a Greek Rebetiko singer, with over 420 records recorded.

== Biography ==
Kyriaki Giortzi Antonopoulou, a.k.a. Ka Koula or Madame Koula (Koula being short for Kyriaki), was the first female Greek singer who became a star in the United States. Between late 1916 and 1950 she recorded around 420 songs.

Ka Koula began her career in Cairo, Egypt, performing together with her husband, laouto player Andreas Antonopoulos. In February 1914 she and her family made their way to the United States. In late 1916 or early 1917, she recorded her first songs for the Columbia label in New York City. They were so popular that she continued to record with Columbia for the next two years.

In 1918, she and her husband decided to use their profits from the Columbia contract to found their own label, Orpheum Record. Ka Koula recorded 40 discs for the label, yet it was short-lived. In February 1919, Ka Koula replaced it with two new labels, Panhellenion Records, which released both her own recordings and those of other Greek musicians, and Constantinople Record, which featured Turkish music. The company that produced both labels, Panhellenion Phonograph Record Co., folded in 1927.

Ka Koula specialized in singing café-aman-style rembetika and other popular Greek music as well as singing in Turkish. In both languages, her records broke sales records.

== See also ==
- Panhellenion Records
