= Talking With... =

1982 play by Jane Martin

Talking With... is a 1982 play by Jane Martin, published by Samuel French Incorporated. The play is composed of eleven ten-minute monologues, each featuring a different woman who talks about her life. The play includes the pieces, "Fifteen Minutes," "Scraps," "Clear Glass Marbles," "Audition," "Rodeo," "Twirler," "Lamps," "Handler," "Dragons," "French Fries," and "Marks." It premiered at the Manhattan Theatre Club in New York in 1982 and has been performed around the world.

The play deals with the personal ordeals of each of the female characters. Many of them are very touching; a few are even intensely emotional. However, there is also the very comical. Even the funny ones, however, have an underlying depth to them that gives a sensitive insight into each of the characters involved. The ladies cover a wide spectrum of life and age from the fading rodeo star in "Rodeo" to the young aspiring actress in "Audition", there is much tenderness and diversity in the subject matter involved in the play.

== Awards ==
- "Talking With" won the Best Foreign Play of the Year award in Germany from Theater Heute magazine.
- 1982 American Theatre Critics Association Award, Best Regional Play
