= Regina Vicarino =

American opera singer (1885–1957)

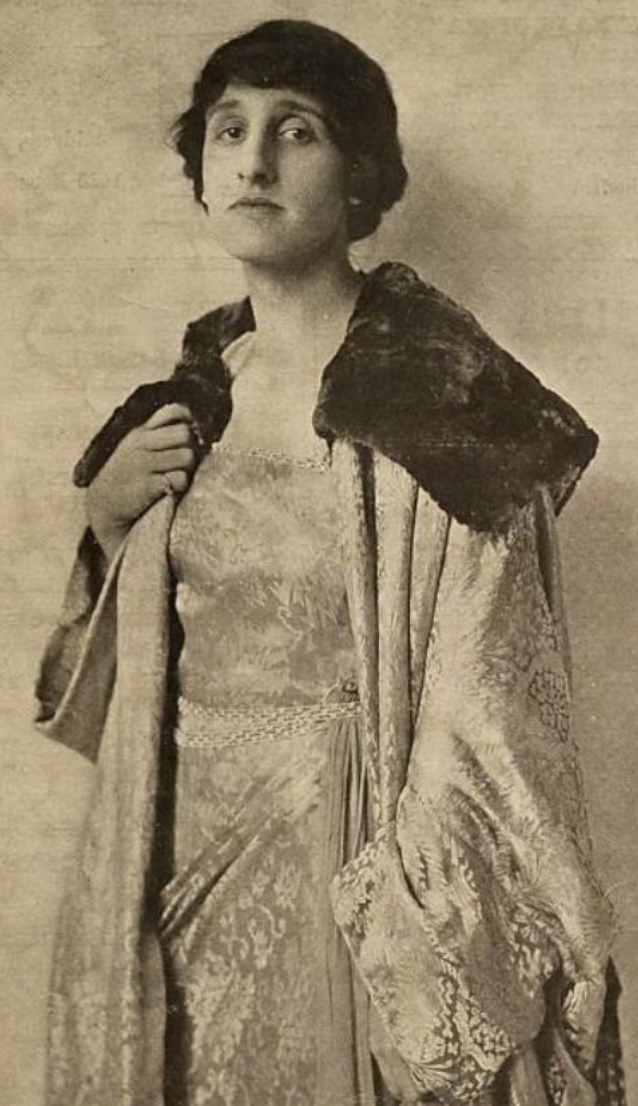
- Regina Vicarino, from a 1921 publication

Background information
- Born: August 23, 1885; New York City
- Died: 1957
- Genres: opera
- Instrument: soprano

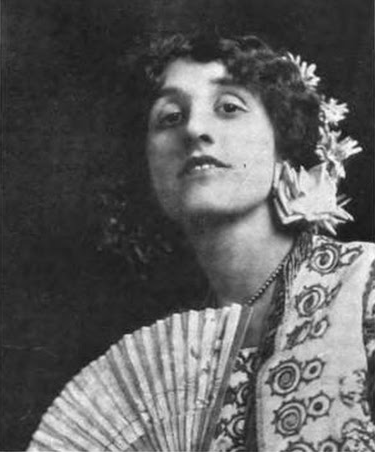
Regina Vicarino, from a 1916 publication.

Regina Vicarino (August 23, 1885 – 1957) was an American soprano opera singer.

== Early life ==
Reine Annette Vicarino was born in New York City, the daughter of Edouard Joseph Vicarino and Leontine Camille Serre Vicarino. Her father was born in Switzerland; her mother was born in New York, to French-born parents. Reine (who used the Italian form of her name, Regina) studied voice with Delia Valeri, and with Arthur Lawrason in New York.

== Career ==
In 1906, Vicarino performed several small roles in the first season of Oscar Hammerstein I's Manhattan Opera Company. From there she went on to perform in Italy, and was given "a priceless souvenir" by the Duke and Duchess of Connaught (Prince Arthur and Princess Louise Margaret) for a performance in Malta.

Vicarino's voice was described as having "all the range and limpidity of an ideal coloratura," in the Los Angeles Herald in 1910; the critic went into further detail, writing that "The upper register is clear and brilliant, and the lower tones are wonderfully vibrant and rich for a coloratura voice." She frequently sang the lead role in Donizetti's Lucia di Lammermoor, and she was also considered successful as Violetta in La traviata, and as Micaela in Carmen.

She sang with the Bevani Grand Opera Company in San Francisco in 1910. Shortly after that she performed in Mexico City with Alessandro Bonci and Florencio Constantino, after which she spent two years performing in Europe. In the 1917–1918 season she toured New England and Canada with the Giuseppe Creatore Grand Opera Company. In 1921, she sang a recital at Carnegie Hall, performed in the summer "Zoo Grand Opera" productions in Cincinnati, Ohio, and she toured cities in the western United States and Canada with the San Carlo Opera Company. In 1922, she appeared in a radio production of Mozart's The Impresario. She made recordings for Lyric Records, and for others under the pseudonym "Josepha Donnelli".

Later in her career, she taught voice privately and at Sullins College, Brenau College, and Arlington Hall. In 1935 and 1937, she appeared at the Mazica Hall in Miami, Florida, giving "operalogues".

== Personal life ==
Regina Vicarino married businessman George Vest Guyer in 1912. They had a daughter, Regina "Mimi" Vicarino Guyer, born in 1916. George died suddenly in 1922. Regina Vicarino died in 1957, aged 71.
