= Delia Valeri =

American vocal coach

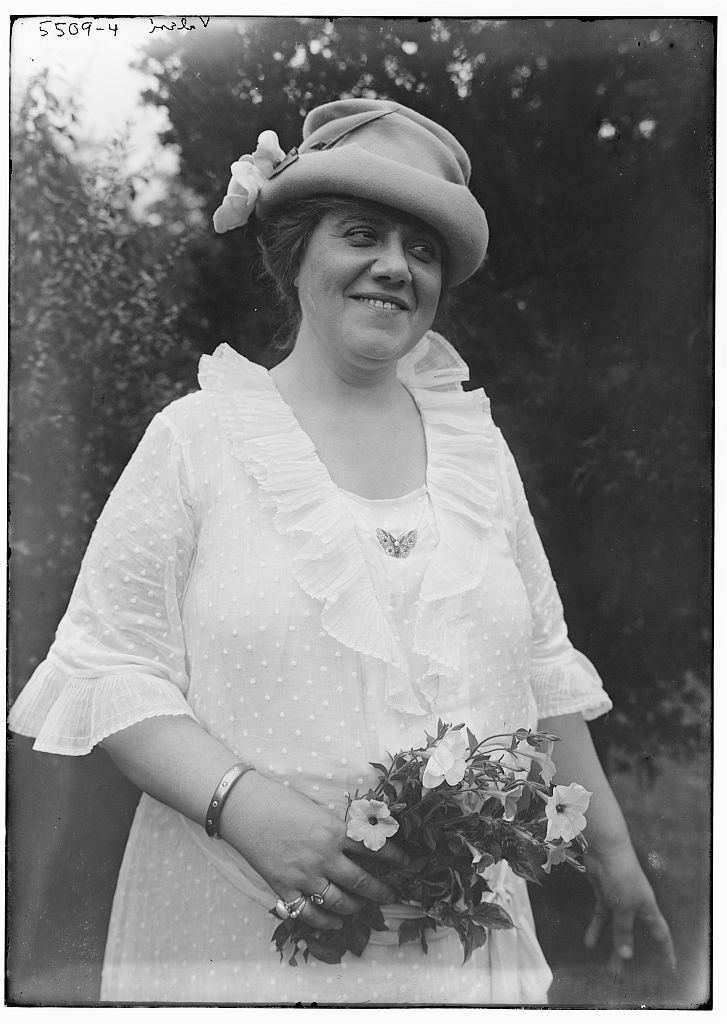
- Delia Valeri, from the Library of Congress.
- Born: October 4, 1870; Italy
- Died: January 27, 1947; Los Angeles, California
- Occupation: Vocal coach

Delia Micucci Valeri (October 4, 1870 – January 27, 1947) was an American vocal coach, born in Italy.

== Early life ==
Delia Micucci was born in Italy, and graduated from the National Academy of Santa Cecilia in Rome. She moved to the United States before 1901.

== Career ==
Valeri taught voice students and opera professionals in New York and Chicago, including Regina Vicarino, Maude Fay, Melanie Kurt, Margaret Matzenauer, Clara Clemens, and Frieda Hempel. She worked with African-American soprano Florence Cole Talbert in Italy in the 1920s. Her male clients included Clarence Whitehill. She also provided piano accompaniment at recitals.

In 1942 Valeri opened a studio in Hollywood.

== Personal life ==
Delia Micucci married August Valeri in New York City about 1901. They had daughters Adelaide and Rosa. In 1914, Delia Valeri won a $2000 judgment after a chronic stomach ailment she traced to a meal on a pullman car. In 1915, August and Delia Valeri were passengers in a car with Margaret Matzenauer and her husband Edoardo Ferrari-Fontana when it was involved in a collision in New York. Valeri died in 1947, aged 76, in Los Angeles, California.
