= Precision Talent =

American talent management company

- Founded: 2007
- Country of origin: United States
- Location: Los Angeles, California

Precision Talent was a voice over talent management company, audio production house, voice over casting service, and a spoken word record label. Founded in 2007, the label is headquartered in Los Angeles, California.

Precision Talent represented a talent pool called "The 100", which is composed of voice over talent based in Los Angeles, New York, Toronto, London, and San Francisco.

Members of “The 100” included: Leigh Kelly, Melanie Harrison, Doug Gochman, Virginia Hamilton, Juliet Wendell Brown, Brian Boyd, Marnie Saitta, Catherine Taber, Claudia Black, Milton Lawrence, Nicholas Hosking, Mike Vaughn, Andy Caploe, Kathy Grable, Chitra Elizabeth, Molly Hagan, Susan Balboni, Edoardo Ballerini, Sondi Kroeger, G.K. Bowes, Jack Dennis, David Paluck, Tansy Alexander, Shenita Moore, Samantha Robson, Karen Strassman, Matt Ritchey, Jennifer Aquino, John Balma, Leo G. Brown, Kay Bess, Ian Gregory, Robert Cait, Sirena Irwin, Robert Izenberg, Lisa Fuson, Addie Daddio, Chris Fries, Joe Joe Camareno, Alethea Allen, Gwen Mcgee, Giselle Achecar, Eric Loomis, Kipp Shiotani, Nancy Sullivan, Danny Garcia, Alex Alba, Ann Dewig, Keri Tombazian, Zach Hanks, John Capellaro, Kecia Cooper, Shelly Callahan, Mike Dunahee, Kay Lenz, Rochelle Greenwood.

== History ==
Precision Talent was founded by Cheryllynn Carter, who worked for thirteen years at TBWA\Chiat\Day in Los Angeles. She began her career at the Los Angeles Music Center.
