= Kiddyphone =

Label of 5½ inch Kiddyphone record

Kiddyphone was a 1920s United Kingdom record label which issued small-sized gramophone records aimed at young children.

The label was owned by the Crystalate Gramophone Record Manufacturing Company Ltd., which also manufactured Imperial records. Some Kiddyphone releases were edited versions of recordings already issued on the Imperial label - this was also the case with Kiddyphone's sister label Mimosa.

Kiddyphone records were issued in three different sizes (7 inch, 5½ inch, and 6 inch) during the label's lifetime. As with many records of this type, the recording artists are not always credited on Kiddyphone record labels.
