= Meritt Records (1979) =

Meritt Records was a jazz record label started by Jerry Valburn in 1979. It made limited-edition reissues of early jazz that could be bought only through mail-order by members of the Meritt Record Society. Valburn also issued the Duke Ellington Treasury Series. These were recordings of radio broadcasts Ellington made for the U.S. Treasury Department in 1945–1946.

== See also ==
- List of record labels
