= Purchase Records =

Independent record label

Purchase Records is a small record label started in 2000 by Joe Ferry, Jim McElwaine, and Karl Kramer, to showcase the talents of the students and faculty at the Purchase College Conservatory of Music. Despite only having released five CDs, the label has already garnered three Grammy nominations for Best Contemporary Folk Album, 2000 (Public Domain); Best Classical Vocal Performance, 2001; and Best Classical Keyboard Performance, 2002. Student work featured in the first release, Public Domain, includes "Mockingbird" by Regina Spektor and "House of the Rising Sun" by Roxy Perry, both of whom have gone on to solo careers.

The Purchase facilities include a 48-track studio. Releases include albums by Jacque Trussel, chairman of the college's voice department, Doug Munro, head of the jazz studies program, and Bradley Brookshire, director of graduate studies at Purchase. All proceeds from sales are donated to the conservatory's scholarship fund.

== Releases ==
- Public Domain (2000) - nominated for a Grammy as Best Contemporary Folk Album
- Jacque Trussel, Tenor: Sounds & Sweet Airs: Scenes & Arias for Tenor (2001) - nominated for a Grammy as Best Classical Vocal Performance
- Bradley Brookshire, Harpsichord: J.S. Bach, The French Suites (2001) - nominated for a Grammy as Best Classical Keyboard Performance
- Doug Munro, Mariano Mangas: Jazz Flamenco Guitars (2001)
- Jazz Faculty @ Purchase College - 10th Anniversary Celebration (2002)

== See also ==
- List of record labels
