= Pyramid Gang Records =

American independent record label

Pyramid Gang Entertainment
- Logo of Pyramid Gang Entertainment
- Parent company: Symphonic Distribution
- Founded: established = 2015
- Founder: Jahmirris Smith
- Status: Active
- Distributor: Roc Nation Distribution Dallas Austin Distribution
- Genre: Hip Hop and R&B
- Country of origin: United States of America
- Location: Atlanta, Georgia Huntsville, Alabama
- Official website: www.pyramidgang.com

Pyramid Gang Records (originally Pyramid Gang Entertainment) is an American record label, distribution, publishing and management company based in Huntsville, Alabama and Atlanta, Georgia. The company was founded in 2011 and established in 2014 by music executive and serial entrepreneur Jahmirris "CEO Jay" Smith. Today, it operates in Atlanta, Georgia with affiliations with other prominent independent record labels and home to R&B artist King Montiez.

== See also ==
- List of record labels
