= Mainya Music =

Mainya Music Entertainment
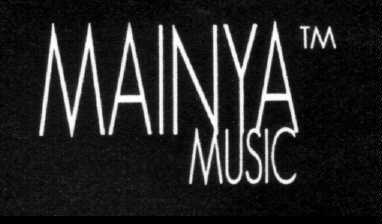
- Founded: 1990
- Founder: Fabian I. Thibodeaux
- Genre: Piano solo, classical, Christmas, folk, Cajun, world, acoustic, New-age, pop, alternative
- Country of origin: U.S.
- Location: New York City
- Official website: www.isadar.com

Mainya Music is an independent self-distributed record label formed by Isadar (Fabian I. Thibodeaux) in 1990. Mainya Music Entertainment was used as the label name to coincide with Isadar's (BMI) Broadcast Music, Inc. affiliated publishing company, Mainya Music Publishing. The label has evolved into Thibodeaux producing and releasing other types of music and videos, including recordings of antique music boxes, authentic Cajun music as well as holiday and classical genres. Other products the label manufactures and distributes are DVDs, software for the Yamaha Disklavier player-piano, and sheet music.

== Roster ==
- Dexter Thibodeaux
- Howard & J.W. Thibodeaux
- Isadar
- Regina Music Box
- Various Antique Music Boxes: including Symphonion 9 & 1/2", Troubadour 8 & 7/8" (with bells), Kalliope 13 & 1/4" (with bells), Polyphon 14 & 1/8" (with bells), Regina 15 & 1/2" (double-comb), and the Regina 27"

== Discography ==
- (1990) Near the Edge of Light (piano solos) – Isadar (MME-0100)
- (1994) Elevations (Electronic Soundscapes) – Isadar (MME-0700)
- (1997) Dream of the Dead – Isadar (MME-0200)
- (1997) Dream of the Dead (Instrumental Version) – Isadar (MME-0225)
- (1998) Cycles – Isadar (MME-0300)
- (1998) Cycles (Instrumental Version) – Isadar (MME-0350)
- (1999) Active Imagination (solo piano) – Isadar (MME-0400)
- (1999) In Search for the Meaning of Christmas (solo piano) – Isadar (MME-0500)
- (1999) Too Hot to Handel! (organ collection) – Dexter Thibodeaux (MME-0600)
- (2000) The Journey (piano) – Isadar (MME-0800)
- (2000) Memories of Christmas – Regina Music Box (MME-0900)
- (2001) Near the Edge of Light – Yamaha Disklavier Software – Isadar (MME-0100YD)
- (2001) Active Imagination – Yamaha Disklavier Software – Isadar (MME-0400YD)
- (2001) in Search for the Meaning of Christmas – Yamaha Disklavier Software – Isadar (MME-0500YD)
- (2001) The Journey – Yamaha Disklavier Software – Isadar (MME-0800YD)
- (2001) Sampler: Lite Sounds – Yamaha Disklavier Software – Isadar (MME-1100YD)
- (2003) The Purple Heart (improvisational solo piano) – Isadar (MME-0101)
- (2003) The Purple Heart (improvisational solo piano) Yamaha Disklavier Software – Isadar (MME-1000YD)
- (2005) Lessons in Love (3–disc set) – Isadar (MME-0110/0111/0112)
- (2005) Lessons in Love (3–disc set) (Instrumental Version) – Isadar (MME-0113/0114/0115)
- (2006) Private Property – Isadar (MME-0120)
- (2006) Private Property (Instrumental Version) – Isadar (MME-0125)
- (2006) Cajun Folk Music– Howard & J.W. Thibodeaux (MME-0150)
- (2006) Scratching the Surface – Sampler (Disc One – Solo Piano) – Isadar (MME-0160)
- (2006) Scratching the Surface – Sampler (Disc Two – Electro-Voice) – Isadar (MME-0165)
- (2006) Scratching the Surface – Sampler (Disc Two – Electro-Voice) (Instrumental Version) – Isadar (MME-0167)
- (2007) Antique Music Box Collection (6–disc set) – Various Antique Music Boxes (MME-0145)
- (2007) LiFe v.2.o – Isadar (MME-0170)
- (2007) LiFe v.2.o (Instrumental Version) – Isadar (MME-0175)
- (2008) The Omega Point – Isadar (MME-0180)
- (2008) The Omega Point (Instrumental Version) – Isadar (MME-0185)
- (2008) Active Imagination – solo piano sheet music collection – Isadar
- (2008) in Search for the Meaning of Christmas – solo piano sheet music collection – Isadar
- (2009) The Journey – solo piano sheet music collection – Isadar
- (2010) The Purple Heart (improvisational solo piano) – sheet music collection – Isadar
- (2010) Near the Edge of Light (solo piano sheet music collection) – Isadar
- (2010) ISADAR – Video Collection (Volume I – Disc One) DVD (MME-0191)
- (2010) ISADAR – Video Collection (Volume I – Disc Two) DVD (MME-0192)
- (2010) ISADAR – Video Collection (Volume II – Disc One) DVD (MME-0201)
- (2010) ISADAR – Video Collection (Volume II – Disc Two) DVD (MME-0202)
- (2010) ISADAR – Solo Piano (Volume 1) DVD (MME-0211)
- (2010) ISADAR – Solo Piano (Volume 2) DVD (MME-0212)
- (2010) ISADAR – Solo Piano (Volume 3) DVD (MME-0213)
- (2010) ISADAR – Christmas Solo Piano DVD (MME-0220)
- (2010) Solo Piano Anthology: 1990–2010 (6–disc set) – Isadar (MME-0230)
- (2011) Antique Music Box Christmas Collection, Disc 1 – Various Antique Music Boxes (MME-0146)
- (2011) Antique Music Box Christmas Collection, Disc 2 – Various Antique Music Boxes (MME-0147)
- (2011) Scratching the Surface (solo piano sampler) – solo piano sheet music collection – Isadar
- (2012) Reconstructed (solo piano) – Isadar (MME-0240) [produced by Will Ackerman]
- (2012) O Christmas (solo piano) – Isadar (MME-0250)
- (2012) O Christmas (solo piano) – solo piano sheet music collection – Isadar
- (2013) Red (piano) – Isadar (MME-0260)
- (2013) Red (piano) – solo piano sheet music collection – Isadar
- (2013) The Grand Opera House of the South Presents: ISADAR (in solo piano concert) DVD (MME-0245)
- (2016) Magical Fantasy Flute – Isadar (MME-0270)

== See also ==
- List of record labels
