= Subplate Records =

German record label

Subplate Recordings is a Drum and Bass record label from Germany. The owner is Typecell.

== Discography ==
- CDLP 01 - Typecell - Voice Of Submission - (CD) - 2004
- Track listing:
- 01 Attack Of The Clones (6:16)
- 02 New World Order (5:28)
- 03 Soul Defender (5:36)
- 04 Higher Levels (5:07)
- 05 Rise Of Anger (5:34)
- 06 Die Wahrheit (5:29)
- 07 Acid Air Raid (6:00)
- 08 D@rkne55 (4:49)
- 09 Insider (6:13)
- 10 Trauma (4:50)
- 11 You Make Me Sick (6:15)
- 12 Voice Of Submission (5:09)
- written & produced by Guido Hoppe @ Acidlab Studio Kassel Germany for Subplate Records

== See also ==
- List of record labels
