= Oldies-33 =

Defunct subsidiary of Vee-Jay Records

- Founded: 1963
- Founder: Vee-Jay Records
- Country of origin: United States

Oldies-33 was a subsidiary of Vee-Jay Records. It was started in 1963 to distribute their old 33 rpm records.

== See also ==
- List of record labels
