= Flaming Guns of the Purple Sage =

Flaming Guns of the Purple Sage is a sadistic satirical play by Jane Martin.

== Synopsis ==
Big 8, a rodeo competitor, is facing foreclosure on the Wyoming ranch where she rehabilitates injured rodeo cowboys. The arrival of a shocking woman named Shedevil and a one eyed Ukrainian biker named Black Dog leads to violence and horror in a satire on the cowboy mentality of pulp western writers like Zane Grey.
