= Panhellenion Records =

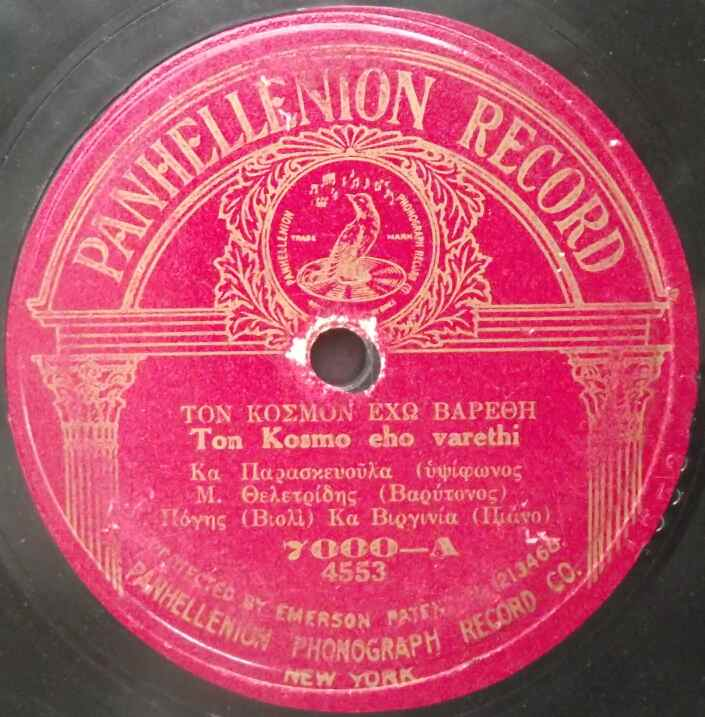
- Founded: 1919
- Founder: Kyria Koula
- Defunct: 1927
- Status: Defunct
- Genre: Greek music
- Country of origin: U.S.

The Panhellenion Phonograph Record Company, commonly referred to as Panhellenion Records, was an American record label, started in 1919 which issued numerous 78 rpm records featuring ethnic Greek music. Founded by Kyria Koula (alternates: Coulas, Giortzi-Andonopoulou) who had become the prominent Greek recording artist in America while recording for Columbia Records. As such, it is almost certainly the first female-owned record label. The label was associated with Emerson Records. It was successful enough to open a branch office in Chicago. The label folded in 1927 with the death of Koulas' husband. The label is an important part of the preservation of the Greek music heritage of popular Greek folk paradosiako dimotiko and rebetiko music style tradition.
