= Protest Records =

- Founder: Thurston Moore and Kim Gordon
- Status: Defunct
- Genre: Protest songs
- Country of origin: United States of America
- Location: Northampton, Massachusetts
- Official website: http://www.protest-records.com/

Protest Records is a subversive, online record label that creates mp3 compilation albums, which are released for free download. The label was founded by Thurston Moore and Kim Gordon of Sonic Youth with Stephan Said. The original intent of the label was to actually produce vinyl LPs, which would have been secretly placed in records stores; the goal was to confuse record store clerks because the records would not have been in their computer system. This plan was rejected when the label owners realized it would be cost prohibitive. The label intended to release at least ten "volumes" or compilation albums but to date has released only eight. The label is now defunct in that it does not receive any new submissions and does not intend to release new material in the immediate future, but pledges to continues to host the previously released albums online. Some well-known artists who have been released on Protest Records include Beastie Boys (vol. 1), Cat Power (vol. 1), Sonic Youth (vol. 2), DJ Spooky (vol 3.), Saul Williams (vol 3.), Mudhoney (vol. 4), Chumbawamba (vol. 5), and Allen Ginsberg (vol. 7). The motto of the label is: "use 'em for yrself. give 'em to friends. just don't sell 'em".
