= MTA Records (American record label) =

Defunct American record label

- Founded: 1966
- Founder: Bob Thompson, Bob Mack
- Defunct: 1970
- Status: Inactive
- Genre: Pop, jazz, classical, country, rock
- Country of origin: U.S.
- Location: New York, NY

MTA Records was an American record label operating in New York City between 1966 and 1970.

== Establishment ==
MTA Records was established in New York City in April 1966 as a subsidiary of talent management firm MTA Productions, Ltd. Vice-president Bob Thompson and general manager Bob Mack headed up the label, and Dick Behrke was named music director. The initials were said to stand for Music Talent Artistry.

The label was targeted for broad music appeal. Its first two 45 rpm singles were “Milord,” by King Richard's Fluegel Knights, and “Call Him Back,” by vocalist Brenda Byers. MTA's first LP release was “Sign of the Times,” by King Richard's Fluegel Knights.

== Artist Roster ==
In its first seven months, MTA Records released thirteen disks. By March 1967, the Fluegel Knights had become well established and had released the group's second album. The group became the label's best-selling artist, and released six MTA LPs. Dick Behrke was the group's founder—King Richard.

Other acts signed by the label included Bobby Arvon, the Forsaken, the Powers of Blue, Warren Baker, Vi Velasco, jazz trombonist Bill Watrous, British folk singer Peter Sayers, the Collins-Shepley Galaxy, and contemporary rock group The New Apocalypse.

In an expansion into the country music field, the label signed two country artists, Bill Goodwin, and Joann Bon & The Coquettes, and, in January 1968, signed Gene Crawford and Sharon Roberts. Jim Slone had joined the label by November 1969.

In April 1969, the label announced the premiere of a new line, the New World Series, which was planned to issue stereo 45 rpm singles. The first was a classical offering, “Clair de Lune” b/w “Anitra’s Dance,” by Walter Raim conducting the Century 21 Orchestra.

Also that month, Arthur Godfrey joined the label and released “Santa Barbara Gold.” The recording was a combination song and recitation composed by Dick Feller and Claire Durham, prompted by an oil well blow-out from offshore drilling that became known as the Santa Barbara oil spill. Godfrey's subsequent release later in the year was “You Can’t Put The Leaves Back On The Trees.”

In the fall of 1970, MTA released a compilation of ‘50s oldies by The Hollywood Guitars. It appears to have been MTA's last LP release. Two LPs in the New World Series line were also released in 1970, by the Collins-Shepley Galaxy.

== Bob Thompson ==
MTA Records’ Bob Thompson gained experience in the record business before founding the label in 1966. In the 1950s he was sales manager of the Capitol Records branch office in Milwaukee.

In 1959, Thompson was in promotion for Capitol Records.

In November 1964 Thompson was named public relations director for the performing rights organization SESAC.

Within a month of joining SESAC, Thompson announced a series of informal workshop sessions for record companies, trade press, ad agencies, music publishers, retail record shops, and distributors.

Prior to Thompson's affiliation with SESAC he held the position of national promotion manager for Columbia Records’ popular products division. Thompson had joined Columbia in Los Angeles in 1961, as a regional promotion manager. He moved into the national position after serving as promotion manager for the Mountain Pacific Region.

By January 1972, Thompson had returned to SESAC in Nashville. In 1974 he graduated from Vanderbilt Law School and embarked on a legal career that included protecting the intellectual property rights of artists such as Waylon Jennings, Kris Kristofferson, Roger Miller, and Otis Redding. Thompson was president of SESAC prior to his death on January 7, 2009.

== King Richard’s Fluegel Knights Discography ==
- Sign of the Times MTA-1001 / MTS-5001
- Cabaret MTA-1003 / MTS-5003
- Something Super! MTA-1005 / MTS-5005
- Knights on Broadway MTA-1008 / MTS-5008
- Just Some of Those Songs Mrs. Robinson MTA-1011 / MTS-5011
- One of Those Songs MTA-1014 / MTS-5014
