= Pacific Front Recordings =

Canadian independent record label

Pacific Front Recordings is a Canadian independent record label founded in 2004 in Victoria, British Columbia by Justin Humber and Davin Greenwell. They operate the label under the monikers Formulate and AFK, respectively.

== Discography ==
- PFR001: AFK - Magnetic

== See also ==
- List of record labels
- List of electronic music record labels
