= National Music Lovers Records =

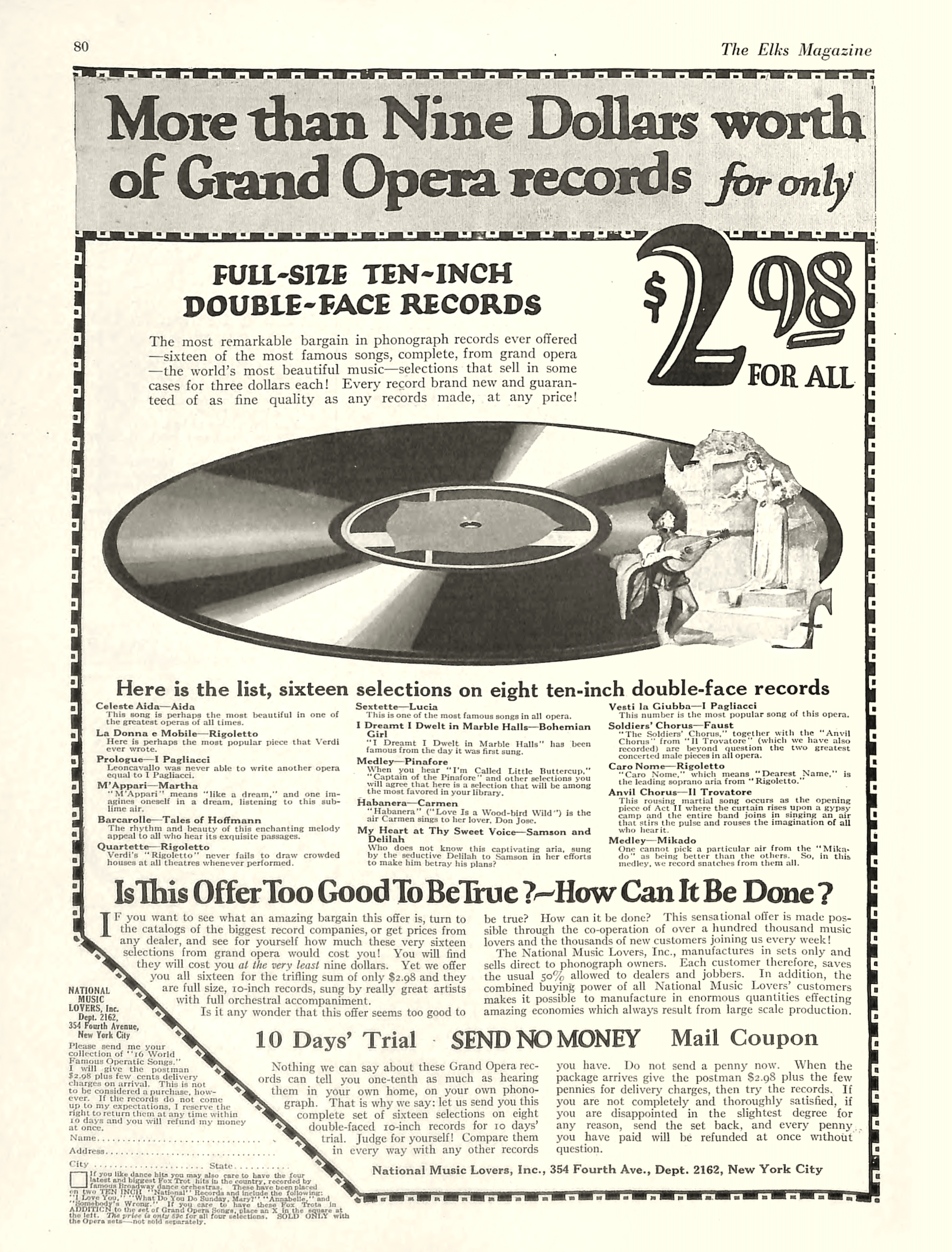
National Music Lovers Inc. print ad for grand opera phonograph records, 1924.

National Music Lovers Records was a United States based record label of the 1920s.

The label was put out by National Music Lovers Incorporated of New York City. The records, issued from 1920 through 1928, was sold via mail order, eight records for three dollars. All the eight records as a single release, with themed series like Operatic Songs, Old-Time Songs, Hymns, Irish Songs, Novelty, and Popular Song & Dance, offering popular music from the 1920s. The recordings were apparently done by other record companies, with masters leased and discs pressed by National Music Lovers. Issues include recordings originally made by Pathé, Emerson, Banner, and other labels. On most if not all National Music Lovers discs the original artists are listed under pseudonyms.

The bulk of sides were popular dance tunes of the era. The label also issued recordings of Irish music, opera, and "old time songs".

== See also ==
- List of record labels
