= Ugly Nephew Records =

Independent record label

Ugly Nephew Records is an independent record label based in both London and New York City. It is intended to play host to a small community of artists in order to facilitate their promotion and releases. The label currently hosts a variety of folk and electronic acts such as Southern Tenant Folk Union and The Zetland Players.

== See also ==
- List of record labels
