= Metascope Records =

Polish independent music label

Metascope Music
- Founded: 2015
- Distributors: Universal Music Poland, Sony Music Entertainment Poland
- Genre: Various
- Country of origin: Gdańsk, Poland
- Location: Poland
- Official website: www.metascope.com

Metascope Music is a Polish independent record label and music-production brand associated with Diverger Polska. Diverger Polska was founded in 2009 as a strategic marketing consultancy. In 2015, the company began operating under the Metascope Music brand, working with major music companies including Universal Music Polska, Sony Music Entertainment Poland and Warner Music Poland.

The Metascope Music catalogue has included releases and co-releases by Polish pop artists including Paula Biskup, Juli Chan and Inka Ink.

== History and releases ==
In 2018, Metascope Music was involved in the release of Paula Biskup's debut single Wyliczanka, issued by Sony Music Entertainment Poland under an exclusive licence from Metascope Music. The single was promoted in connection with Poland's selection process for the Junior Eurovision Song Contest 2018. Polish music media reported that Biskup had submitted Wyliczanka to the national selection for the contest, while ESKA described it as the first Polish proposal for the 2018 Junior Eurovision national selection. Her later single Bez pośpiechu was released by Metascope Music in 2019.

Metascope Music has also released and promoted recordings by Juli Chan, including Miło Mi Cię Poznać, Budzę Się, Zniknę Z Tobą, Not a Crime, Joe Le Taxi, Relapse and L'abeille.

In 2023, Juli Chan and Cleo released the single Wyloguj się, which was issued by Warner Music Poland. ESKA described the release as a duet by Juli Chan and Cleo, and reported that Chan had been associated with Poland's Eurovision 2023 selection through the song Relapse.

In 2026, Universal Music Polska's press service announced Juli Chan's single and music video Tryb Nocny, describing the release as a dark, vampire-inspired pop project. Spotify lists Tryb Nocny as released by Metascope Music in 2026.

In the 2020s, Metascope Music also developed and released music by Inka Ink, a fictional virtual artist project combining pop music, satire, visual worldbuilding and AI-supported production. Polish media described Inka Ink as a non-existent artist placed in a fictional pre-war setting, with the character presented as living 90 years before the contemporary world. Planeta Trójmiasto described the project as a virtual artist rooted in the atmosphere of pre-war Warsaw, revue, cabaret and social satire, while Trojmiasto.pl described the music video for Kanapki z Hajsem as an AI-generated vision of Gdynia in 1936, including references to the city port, the Maritime Station, the ocean liner MS Piłsudski and captain Mamert Stankiewicz.

Releases credited to Metascope Music include Marcel Kustosz, Śmigły-Rydz, Lolo Pindolo, Kanapki Z Hajsem, Całujcie Mnie and the album Inka Śpiewa Tuwima.

== Metascope Creative ==
From 2025, Metascope Music was presented within the broader Metascope brand, which developed an offer across strategy, creative production and culture. Polish trade media described Metascope Creative as a content-production studio for brands, using artificial intelligence, digital actor clones and AI-supported audio, photo and video production. In 2025, Wirtualne Media also covered a Metascope Creative AI-supported advertising project inspired by Christmas truck advertising.

== Selected artists and releases ==
- Paula Biskup – Wyliczanka, Bez pośpiechu
- Juli Chan – Miło Mi Cię Poznać, Budzę Się, Zniknę Z Tobą, Joe Le Taxi, Not a Crime, Relapse, Wyloguj się, L'abeille, Tryb Nocny
- Inka Ink – Marcel Kustosz, Śmigły-Rydz, Lolo Pindolo, Kanapki Z Hajsem, Całujcie Mnie, Inka Śpiewa Tuwima
