= Phantom City Studios =

Independent record label

Phantom City Studio
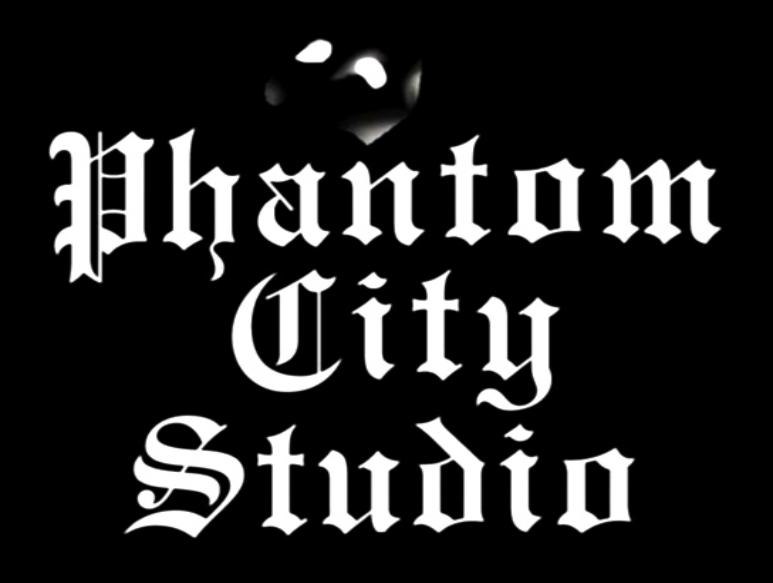
- Founded: 1999
- Genre: Classical, pop, hip hop, R&B, rock, country, gospel
- Country of origin: U.S.
- Location: Orlando, Florida
- Official website: www.phantomcitystudio.com

Phantom City Studio is an independent record label and audio recording studio in Orlando, Florida that started in 1999.

== Notable artists ==
The recording studio is noted for its work with celebrities including Shaquille O'Neal, Miley Cyrus, Justin Bieber, Eminem, Snoop Dogg, Jose Altuve, Crystal McCahill, Cory Gunz, Lindsay Lohan, and major companies such as Disney, Universal Studios, Dr. Phillips, 20th Century Fox, The History Channel, Discovery Channel, Cartoon Network, E! Entertainment Television, American Idol, Scholastic Corporation, Toys "R" Us, HBO, Showtime, MTV, and VH1.

== Phantom City ==
The studio is named after an excerpt from the 7th chapter of the Lotus Sutra, Phantom City.

== See also ==
- List of US recording studios
- List of record labels
- White label
