= Primary Music =

Israeli record label

- Founded: 2003
- Founder: Suzy
- Distributor(s): Helicon Records
- Genre: World music, New-age, Lounge and ambient
- Country of origin: Israel
- Official website: http://www.primary-music.com/

Primary Music is an Israeli independent record label, specializing in World music, New Age, Lounge and ambient. Primary Music is located in Tel Aviv, Israel.

In September 2003, having quit her former label, world music singer Suzy established 'Primary Music' as an independent label. Her goal was to create a personal label that can promote her music according to her own artistic perception. Later the label became a home for other "world music" performers.

== Artists ==
These artists have released recordings through Primary Music:

- Margalit Matitiahu
- Nissim Amon (Zen Master)
- Khalas
- David Broza
- Omar Faruk Tekbilek

== See also ==
- Lists of record labels
