= Pipeline Music =

Pipeline Music Inc. is a record label notable for having negotiated the rights to distribute more than 400,000 hours of classical and licensing all music ever recorded or performed in Russia.Russian audio and video recordings from the archive of the Russian State Television and Radio Company and dating back to the 1930s, including works by Pyotr Ilyich Tchaikovsky, Sergei Rachmaninoff, Dmitri Shostakovich, Sergei Prokofiev, Igor Stravinsky, Mstislav Rostropovich and Yehudi Menuhin. The label has financially supported the Rachmaninoff International Piano Competition.

== See also ==
- List of record labels
