= Vision Quest Records =

- Founded: 1996
- Country of origin: Japan
- Location: Tokyo

Vision Productions was established in 1996 in Tokyo, Japan by Tania (Sonja) Miller and Shimon Biton. The company is one of the original electronic dance music producers in Japan. In addition to producing a yearly festival, called "Vision Quest: The Gathering", Vision Productions also produces monthly events in Tokyo and Osaka working with internationally renowned artists such as Astrix and GMS as well as promoting local artists like Mitsumoto, Kenji and Alternative Control. The company has produced events overseas in Mexico, Israel, Thailand and India ((Canada)). Vision Quest is known for its hard hitting full power productions. Vision Quest Record label, and film productions have produced and distributed albums from many of their artists as well as an annual DVD of the Gathering festival.

The company works with File records (Sony Music), HMV, Tower Records, Virgin Music, Cisco, Quintrix, Acoustic (Sound Company) Egg House (Lights) M.M.Delight (VJ's) Inter FM (Radio) Space Shower TV (Television). It advertises regularly in trade magazines like Floor, Loud and Club Juice.

== See also ==
- List of record labels
