= Heldur Jõgioja =

Estonian journalist, composer, writer

- Born: Bronisław Vjazhowsky; September 21, 1936; Elva, Estonia
- Died: April 21, 2010 (aged 73); Tartu, Estonia
- Other name: Heldur Aavik
- Occupations: Musician, composer, writer, journalist

Heldur Jõgioja (previously Heldur Aavik, born Bronisław Vjazhowsky; 21 September 1936 – 21 April 2010) was an Estonian musician, composer, writer, and journalist.

Jõgioja's name at birth was Bronisław Vjazhowsky, and later took the name Heldur Aavik, then Heldur Jõgioja. Jõgioja was born in Elva and graduated from the Faculty of Law of Tartu State University in 1964. Aftwewards, he worked as a lawyer in Kohtla-Järve and Tartu and worked as a reporter for Õhtuleht. In 1974, he joined the musical ensemble Suveniir as a keyboardist and accordionist. In total, he created about 300 songs and more than 1000 song texts. He also published collections of poetry, wrote historical plays, novels and short stories. He was the owner of the record label LeHelMus. He died in Tartu.

== Awards ==
- Order of the White Star, V class.

== Selected books ==
- Eesti Rukki Seltsi laulik. Kirjastus LeHelMus. ISBN 9790540020859
- Kaika Lainest Vangani. ISBN 978-9949-15-926-0
- Kriminaalne tragikomöödia. ISBN 978-9949-18-777-5
- Himmleri Tartust pärit ihuarst. Kirjastus LeHelMus. ISBN 978-9949-18-859-8
