= Manyc Records =

Manyc Records is an artist owned music company based in the Bronx, New York, USA.

== History ==
In 1999, Milt Opus, a band composed of Lycée Français de New York students and alumni, self-produced and recorded their first album, "Up to basement," in a Manhattan basement. Once the recording was done, they decided to distribute it on their own. They determined that starting a record company was the best path forward, and Milt Music was born.

Igor Hansen-Love, the bass player in Milt Opus, was an early mentor to Nikolai Fraiture, who, together with Julian Casablancas, also attended the LFNY, and formed a band called The Strokes in 1998, shortly after Milt Opus played its first gig at The Spiral, an East Houston Street music venue in New York City.

Recording artists were added to the roster beginning in 2002, with a focus on rock, pop, and electronic music.

In 2003, the company name was changed to Manyc Records.

Currently, Manyc Records operates in the Bronx, New York, headquarters of Scenyc.

== Related artists ==
Bandamous • Flow • Jeremy Luke • Kapsil • Mangrove • Milt Opus • Mikegonekal • Mousky • Multiple Mono • Patrice P. Fidole • Rob Paterson • Strip Darling • Summer Malice • Tarkus • Tramponaline • Vital Parts
