= Ryan Van Winkle =

American poet

- Born: New Haven, Connecticut
- Education: Syracuse University
- Occupations: Poet, Podcaster
- Writing career
- Notable awards: Crashaw Prize 2009, Saltire Award 2015

Ryan Van Winkle is an American poet, live artist, podcaster and critic. He has two collections of poetry and has created performance poetry for live audiences. His work has appeared in several anthologies. His poems have also appeared in New Writing Scotland, The Prairie Schooner and The American Poetry Review.

Van Winkle was the first Reader in Residence at the Scottish Poetry Library. He has also produced and performed podcasts for the Scottish Poetry Library and the Scottish Book Trust.

== Biography ==
Born in New Haven, Connecticut, Van Winkle graduated from Syracuse University, with a dual degree in journalism and political science. Winkle's first collection of poems, Tomorrow We Will Live Here (2010), won the Crashaw Prize. His second collection, The Good Dark, won the 2015 Saltire Society Poetry Book of the Year award.

Van Winkle's performance poetry, Red, Like Our Room Used to Feel was presented at the Edinburgh Festival Fringe in 2012, the Battersea Arts Centre, The Melbourne Fringe, and in the Room for London at the London Literature Festival in 2013.

Van Winkle produced and hosted podcasts for the Scottish Poetry Library for seven years. He also produced podcasts for the Scottish Book Trust As a member of Highlight Arts, Van Winkle has organized festivals and translation workshops in Syria, Pakistan and Iraq. He currently works as Poet in Residence for Edinburgh City Libraries and lives in Edinburgh.

In July 2023 it was announced that Van Winkle had been appointed as the artistic director for StAnza Poetry Festival.

== Poetry collections and live art ==
- The Good Dark (2015)
- Red, Like Our Room Used to Feel (2012)
- Tomorrow We Will Live Here (2010)

== Awards and honours ==
- 2015 Saltire Society Poetry Book of the Year award.
- 2015 Residency at The Studios of Key West in 2015
- 2012 Robert Louis Stevenson Fellowship
- 2009 Crashaw Prize for Poetry
