= Ragged Flag =

British record label

- Founded: 2007
- Founder: Liam Howlett
- Country of origin: UK
- Location: London
- Official website: http://www.theprodigy.com/

Ragged Flag is a record label founded in 2007 by members of the band The Prodigy, and backed by the Cooking Vinyl Group.

== See also ==
- List of record labels
