= Little Marvel =

United Kingdom record label

- Both sizes of Little Marvel records, in comparison to standard 7" 45rpm disc.
- Parent company: Vocalion Records
- Founded: 1921
- Defunct: 1928
- Status: Inactive
- Distributor: Woolworth's
- Genre: Various
- Country of origin: United Kingdom

Little Marvel was a United Kingdom record label which issued small (5 3//8- to 6-inch) gramophone records during the 1920s. The label was owned by the Vocalion record company (known in the United Kingdom as the Aeolian Co, Ltd.), and was part of a competitive market for small, inexpensive discs existing at the time in the United Kingdom and Germany. Little Marvel records were sold exclusively at UK Woolworth's chain stores at a retail price of 6d (sixpence). The Woolworth's logo appeared on the label of the discs.

The first issues appeared in 1921, at select Woolworth's locations, but in 1923 the product became available at all Woolworth's stores.

As with many records of this type, the recording artists are not credited. The labels on the records mention only the song title, the style of music (e.g. foxtrot, waltz), and in some cases the name of the songwriter or composer. The records were popular not only for their price, but also because of the peppiness of the performances. In addition to popular fare, some children's discs were also issued. Most issues paired a popular number which was under copyright and for which royalties were paid, while the other side was a recording of a title under public domain, or with the copyright controlled by the record company.

== See also ==
- List of record labels
