= In Records (United States) =

American folk record label active in the 1960s

- Status: Defunct
- Distributor: Dart Record Sales
- Genre: Folk
- Country of origin: United States

In Records was an American folk record label owned by Dave Hubert and distributed by Dart Record Sales. The label released recordings in 1963 and 1964.

== History ==
In September 1963, Cash Box reported that Dart Record Sales was developing an album catalog with executives of Horizon and In Records, with two hootenanny albums scheduled for immediate release on In. By December, a Dart advertisement listed The Big Hootenanny (IN-LP 1001), The Swinging 12 String (IN-LP 1002) by the In Group featuring Glen Campbell, and the single “Santy Anna” (IN-778).

By June 1964, the label's three-album catalog comprised The Big Hootenanny, The Swinging 12 String, and Rod McKuen's Seasons of the Sun (IN-LP 1003).
