= Lyric Records (US) =

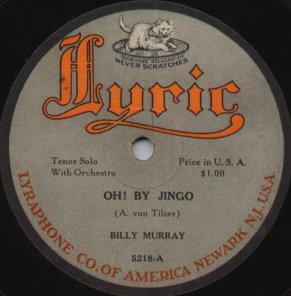
U.S. Lyric label

Lyric Records was a record label based in the United States from about 1917 to 1921.

The parent company of Lyric Records was initially listed on the label as the Lyraphone Company of America, New York City, although actually headquartered in Newark, New Jersey. Later labels reflected the actual location. The label artwork featured a drawing of a white cat (perhaps inspired by the dog Nipper of the Victor Talking Machine Company's His Master's Voice logo) seated on a phonograph record, with the legend "Never Scratches". Lyric Records actually seem to be exactly as prone to scratching as any other shellac 78rpm record of the era.

The first Lyric records were vertical-cut with an unusually narrow groove that required using steel needles, related to that used by British "Marathon" discs, which according to company publicity yielded a playing time of four-and-a-half minutes per 10-inch side and seven minutes per 12-inch side. Over 1000 titles were available by September 1917, including popular vocal, dance, operatic, and orchestral selections. J. Louis von der Mehden was the company's chief conductor, and his diaries (now at the University of Connecticut) detail recording sessions with a 40-player orchestra which he personally recruited, a much larger ensemble than most American recording groups. The recorded sound of Lyric vertical-cut discs is superior to most other contemporary American "hill-and-dale" records. From 1919 Lyric records were double-sided lateral-cut 10-inch discs which have slightly above-average sound quality for the era. The company went into receivership in the fall of 1921 and ceased operations sometime the following year.

Among those recording for Lyric were soprano Regina Vicarino, violinist Vera Barstow, tenor "Mario Rodolfi" (the first stage name of opera star Mario Chamlee), vaudeville comedian and prolific early sound recording star Billy Murray and Harry Yerkes' band featuring early jazz trombonist Tom Brown. The celebrated Polish pianist and composer Sigismund Stojowski made his only records for Lyric, of Anton Rubinstein's Valse caprice in E-flat and Frédéric Chopin's Waltz in A-flat major op. 42.

== See also ==
- List of record labels
- Lyric Records (Germany)
