= Kreislauf =

German netlabel and radio show

- Founded: 2001
- Founder: Andreas Buttweiler, Dirk Hartmann
- Genre: Ambient, Electro, Techno
- Country of origin: Germany
- Location: Hamburg
- Official website: http://kreislauf.org

Kreislauf is a German netlabel and radio show focusing on quality electronic dance music and ambient music in many flavours (house, techno, breakbeat, etc.).

== History ==
Kreislauf recommend and publish electronic music beyond commerce and drawers. The project was founded by Andreas Buttweiler and Thomas Hentrich in 1997 as an Ambient-Club in Mannheim/Germany.

In the year 2000 they started their weekly radio-show "Kreislauf. FM" at the free radio-stadion Bermudafunk in Mannheim and Heidelberg, and since 2004 also at Tide 96.0 in Hamburg.

The Label-Section was founded in 2001 by Dirk Hartmann (label-owner of Hörzu!) and Andreas Buttweiler, and become a netlabel in 2006.

Kreislauf 016 was not released.

== Releases ==
=== Kreislauf ===
- Kreislauf 081 - Josh Winiberg "Game Over"
- Kreislauf 062 - Hug A Turtle Today ":hel"
- Kreislauf 061 - Labkopp "Labkopp LP"

- Kreislauf 060 - Niteffect "Motes Of Dust - B-Sides"
- Kreislauf 059 - Niteffect "Motes Of Dust"
- Kreislauf 058 - Cephlon "Cephlon EP"
- Kreislauf 057 - Sombre Concern "Delayed Delivery"
- Kreislauf 056 - Sascha Müller "Cocaine"
- Kreislauf 055 - Edvenjah "Still In Germany"
- Kreislauf 054 - A7 "Sound Around EP"
- Kreislauf 053 - He-Lux "Native"
- Kreislauf 052 - Johnny Peinlich "Alles Nur Geklaut"
- Kreislauf 051 - Dreza & Niteffect "Dead Cells - Splitt EP"
- Kreislauf 050 - Docma "Unrythmisch Im Takt"
- Kreislauf 049 - choenyi "Metaplastic"
- Kreislauf 048 - Dennsensein "Nur Ein Test"
- Kreislauf 047 - Vai "26 & Extrem"
- Kreislauf 046 - Sulette "My Phasing Fender"
- Kreislauf 045 - Mikael Knite "Drunk And Bass"
- Kreislauf 044 - Niteffect "Lost Identity"
- Kreislauf 043 - FeldFunker "The Absurd Hero"
- Kreislauf 042 - Sten D. "Ride Towards"
- Kreislauf 041 - Alex Cortex "Archive Finds Vol.3"
- Kreislauf 040 - Julian Winter "Ham"
- Kreislauf 039 - Ulf Kramer "Klagelied_oo3"
- Kreislauf 038 - Ambitronic "Hildegard Im Bade"
- Kreislauf 037 - Drugs Made Me Smarter "When The Music's Sober"
- Kreislauf 036 - Ambitronic "Ambitronic"
- Kreislauf 035 - Cyan341 "Numbers"
- Kreislauf 034 - Xavier Arocha "Nova Scotia Robots"
- Kreislauf 033 - Radarfilm "Hinter Der Wahrheit"
- Kreislauf 032 - Julian Winter "Haluz 2 Soundtrack"
- Kreislauf 031 - FeldFunker "Telewelt EP"

- Kreislauf 030 - MarceXL "Artefacto"
- Kreislauf 029 - Ambitronic "Release It"
- Kreislauf 028 - In Vitro "Phantastico Dogma"
- Kreislauf 027 - Julian Winter "Foffi"
- Kreislauf 026 - He-lux "Elastic EP"
- Kreislauf 025 - Various "10 Jahre Kreislauf"
- Kreislauf 024 - Dreza "End Or Fin"
- Kreislauf 023 - choenyi "Over Time"
- Kreislauf 022 - FeldFunker "Beyond The Moon - The Remixes"
- Kreislauf 021 - Christoph Schindling "One Of These Days"
- Kreislauf 020 - FeldFunker "Beyond The Moon"
- Kreislauf 019 - MarceXL "Museo Mix"
- Kreislauf 018 - Engine Ear "Start The Engine"
- Kreislauf 017 - Drugs Made Me Smarter "Best In Peace"
- Kreislauf 016 - not released
- Kreislauf 015 - Dennsensein "My Live"
- Kreislauf 014 - Tom Larson "Dancing In The Night"
- Kreislauf 013 - Niteffect "Fragments"
- Kreislauf 012 - Tails "Drugs Prescriptions"
- Kreislauf 011 - metaFame "Sooner EP"
- Kreislauf 010 - Various "Pathmusick Visits Kreislauf"
- Kreislauf 009 - Aquarell "Lateral Position"
- Kreislauf 008 - Alpha Human "Psychotic Narcotic"
- Kreislauf 007 - Juno6 "Welcome To Heimat"
- Kreislauf 006 - Ascalaphe "Home Trips"
- Kreislauf 005 - MarceXL "Second Mix (Episode II)"
- Kreislauf 004 - Max Marlow "Half A Year"
- Kreislauf 003 - Ixmati "Galaxia Mar"
- Kreislauf 002 - Yax "Really Sunday EP"
- Kreislauf 001 - Yax "Really Sunday E.P." 12"

=== Kreislauf Extra ===
- Kreislauf Extra 018 - Noston "Six"
- Kreislauf Extra 017 - The Idiot Society "Moving Still"
- Kreislauf Extra 016 - litmus0001 "55S 137W"
- Kreislauf Extra 015 - litmus0001 "Grytviken"
- Kreislauf Extra 014 - litmus0001 "Kerguelen"
- Kreislauf Extra 013 - Thierry Massard & Niteffect "Inconnu/Ismeretlen"
- Kreislauf Extra 012 - lufdbf "One"
- Kreislauf Extra 011 - Carsten Brase Und Die Intoleranten Hater "Titel 19"
- Kreislauf Extra 010 - Carsten Brase Und Die Intoleranten Hater "Seenebel"
- Kreislauf Extra 009 - Kasper Knigge "Hel En"
- Kreislauf Extra 008 - Nick Otheen "Live At Sirály Budapest"
- Kreislauf Extra 007 - Dreza "Live At Sirály Budapest"
- Kreislauf Extra 006 - Niteffect "Live At Netaudio Berlin 09 - East Meets West"
- Kreislauf Extra 005 - Khoma Sutra "Kailash"
- Kreislauf Extra 004 - Xavier Arocha "Aneth"
- Kreislauf Extra 003 - Bazaar "Baal"
- Kreislauf Extra 002 - Various "Hands On Thierry Massard - Subverted Versions"
- Kreislauf Extra 001 - Max Marlow "True Spirit EP"

=== Kreislauf Kommerz ===
- Kommerz 01 - Tails "Tripbrett EP"

== See also ==
- List of record labels
