= POF Music =

French record label

POF Music, "Product of France" is an electronic music record label based in Paris, France. It is home to artists such as Joking Sphinx and Moksha.

== See also ==
- List of record labels
