= Newhouse Records =

Independent record label

Newhouse Records is an independent record label that began in 2000 by releasing vintage funk music compilations. It continued with releases of the funk fusion group, Cymande, including The Soul of Rasta (limited pressing 2000), Renegades of Funk (2005) and Promised Heights (2007).

Newhouse also publishes jazz, dance, electronica, funk, soul and deep house music. One project included tracks by St. Germain and a new roster of French artists. Kia, Florian, The Bottle, Versus and Terrasse Tranquille featured on the album Paris Under a Groove, which showcased a "French touch" style, followed up by San Francisco Under a Groove in 2005.
