= Marian Records =

American record label

Marian Records is a Nashville-based record label specializing in pop music with an initial emphasis in electronic and dance music including commercial crossover, house, trance and progressive styles. Formed in 2005, Marian Records' exclusive distributor is RED Distribution (a unit of Sony/ BMG Entertainment). Marian Records' artists include Ella, Siria, Barcera, Volare, Jaymen, Joey Peate, and Sarah Taylor. Marian Records is also home to the MAX brand of dance compilations. Marian Records has enjoyed three singles thus far on the Billboard charts.

== See also ==
- List of record labels
