= List of record labels from Estonia =

List of Estonian record labels

This is the list of record labels from Estonia.

Name	Labeled music (genre)	Established in	Bands	Further info
Aidem Pot		1993		
Bulldozer Records				
Crunch Industry				
Estonian Record Productions				
Fucking Cunt Records	punk/hardcore		J.M.K.E.	
Fugata Records				
Hitivabrik		1997		Owner: Aarne Valmis
HyperElwood				
Kaljuste Music Group				
Kulundpea Records				
Legendaarne Records	hip hop	2005		
LeHelMus (HelMus)				Owner: Heldur Jõgioja
Made In Baltics				
Masterhead Records				
MFM Records			The Flowers of Romance	
Michael Pärt Musik				
Moonwalk Records				
NBS Recordings				
Õunaviks			Puuluup	
RR Gems		2017		
TIKS Rekords		2012		
TopTen				
SekSound (Seksound)		2004		
Silver City Records	Rock / Metal	2019		
Tunitemusic OU	Classical / New Age / Ambient	2020		
