= Lyric Records (Germany) =

Lyric Records was a Germany based record label marketing gramophone records to the British market prior to World War I. The pressings were manufactured by Kalliope Records using masters from other German-based labels recording British material, including Polyphon and principally Favorite.

== See also ==
- List of record labels
- Lyric Records (US)
