= Michael Pärt Musik =

Estonian-Icelandic music production company

Michael Pärt Musik is an Icelandic-Estonian film music, sound and music production company founded by music producer Michael Pärt. The company is focused on score and soundtrack productions for feature films, TV and documentaries. In addition to producing, Michael Pärt Musik deals with engineering, editing, mixing and a little composing as well. Some of the highlights of the company include collaborations with film director Francis Ford Coppola, composers Howard Shore, Richard Harvey, Osvaldo Golijov, rock band Arcade Fire and Icelandic pop artist Björk.

== Current activities ==
=== International Arvo Pärt Centre ===
In 2008, he returned to Estonia, the homeland of his father and the country where he was born, to establish the International Arvo Pärt Centre which he chairs. The foundation preserves Arvo Pärt's creative contribution to the arts and ensures education for future generations.

== Notable projects ==
- 2008 Music Editor, Additional Recording for Robert Young's feature film Wide Blue Yonder Composer: Bill Connor
- 2008 Orchestra Contractor, Session Producer for Ellen Kuras's documentary The Betrayal . Composer: Howard Shore
- 2007 Score and Soundtrack Production; Session Co-producer, Music Editor for Daniel Cohen's feature film Les Deux Mondes . Composer: Richard Harvey
- 2007 Music Editor, Score Post Production, Producer (OST) for Francis Ford Coppola's feature film Youth Without Youth . Composer: Osvaldo Golijov
- 2007 Associate Producer, Editor for Osvaldo Golijov's OST for Youth Without Youth
- 2007 Assistant, Production, Session Producer, Engineer, Editor on Björk's album Volta
- 2007 Orchestra Contractor, Session Producer on Arcade Fire's album Neon Bible
- 2007 Music Editor for Robert Young's feature film Eichmann . Composer: Richard Harvey
- 2005 Music Production for Stewart Raffill's feature film Survival Island . Composer: Richard Harvey
- 2005 Final Mixer, Editor (Sound/Music/FX/Dialogue/ADR) on Magnús Scheving's children TV series LazyTown
- 2004 Technical Supervisor, Music Editor on Brendan Quayles IMAX feature Sacred Journey. Composer: Daryl Griffith
- 2003 Music Production for Manop Udomdej's feature film Keunbab Prompiram Composer: Richard Harvey
- 2003 Music Supervisor, Session Producer, Music Editor for Chatrichalerm Yukol's & Francis Ford Coppola's feature film The Legend of Suriyothai . Composer: Richard Harvey
- 2003 Session Producer, Music Editor, Post Production for Eric Till's feature film Luther . Composer: Richard Harvey
- 2003 Music Editor, Engineer, Music Production for John Henderson's feature film In Search of an Impotent Man . Composers: Richard Harvey, Daryl Griffith and Paul Reeves
- 2003 Original Music for Nick Brooks and Laura Kelly's short film Ozone
- 2002 Music Editor for John Henderson's feature film Two Men Went To War . Composer: Richard Harvey
- 2001 Engineer, Editor, Mixer on alsum "Silk and Bamboo" for "Hucky and Harvey"
- 2000 Original Music for Liivo Niglas' documentary The Brigade
- 2000 Cyclic Evolution
