= Little Wonder Records =

- Parent company: Columbia Phonograph Company
- Founded: 1914
- Defunct: 1923
- Country of origin: United States

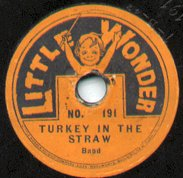

Little Wonder Records was a United States budget record label from 1914 through 1923. The label was known for producing one-sided records with abbreviated versions of songs at a very low price.

== History ==
Little Wonders were manufactured by the Columbia Phonograph Company, and were distributed exclusively by music publisher Henry Waterson (the business partner of Irving Berlin) in their early years (1914–1916) – an arrangement that has only recently been discovered as the original contract stipulated that both parties were to keep this relationship a secret. Artists are generally uncredited on Little Wonder labels, which simply give recordings general attributions such as "band", "tenor", "quartette", or "accordion solo".

Little Wonders were lateral-cut single sided 5 1/2 inch gramophone records. The records contained only about 1 1/2 to 2 minutes of music. The small size of the discs (together with the cherubic face on later versions of the label) has led some record collectors to incorrectly assume that Little Wonders were made as children's records; they were actually made for the general audience looking for low-priced recordings.

The records retailed for ten cents each, some of the lowest priced recordings available at the time. This price point revolutionized popular recorded music, significantly expanding the market. The audio fidelity is average to slightly above average for the time, with rather narrow grooves (best played with a smaller stylus than contemporary discs). An estimated forty million of these records were sold, principally through the sheet music counters of many five and ten cent store chains of the time and through Sears Roebuck catalogs, rather than in record stores.

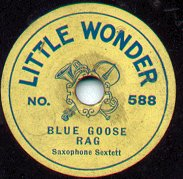

All known Little Wonders were made by artists who also recorded for Columbia. One account says that recording artists would visit the Little Wonder recording studio on one floor of the Woolworth Building before or after making records at the Columbia studio on a higher floor of the same building. There has been some speculation that the masters for Little Wonders were actually warm-up balance checks recorded as tests at the beginning of Columbia recording sessions; if such tests happened to record a usable performance, they would be leased to Little Wonder. However, court papers from an early lawsuit between Waterson and Victor Emerson indicate that performers were paid separately and specifically to record for Little Wonder records.

Little Wonder #1 was "Ben Bolt", sung by Henry Burr, who would make more recordings for the label than any other artist. The vaudevillian Sam Ash made the most recordings as a solo artist, beginning with Little Wonder #98, a version of "Chinatown, My Chinatown".Al Jolson recorded a version of "Back to the Carolina You Love" (1914) on the label; Jolson was a Columbia artist, but this was his only Little Wonder recording. Other noted artists of the day whose performances were released (uncredited) on Little Wonder include Gene Greene, Wilbur Sweatman, Billy Murray, Vernon Dalhart, Frank Crumit, the Louisiana Five and the California Ramblers.

Beginning in 1916 Columbia took full control of Little Wonder, and in 1917 it began issuing small illustrated children's books called "Bubble Books", and were also best sellers. Much later Columbia also issued various promotional discs in the same "small disc" numerical series, but these should not be confused with the Little Wonder label.

Little Wonder #339, "The Camp Meeting Jubilee" by a male vocal "quartette", issued in 1916, contains the lyrics "We've been rockin' an' rolling in your arms / Rockin' and rolling in your arms / In the arms of Moses." This is believed to be one of the earliest uses in an audio recording of the phrase "rock ... and roll", albeit in the context of a religious spiritual. (Note: One earlier recorded version of the same song is known, a 1904 Victor recording that is unlikely to have had an audience comparable to the inexpensive Little Wonder version.)

== See also ==
- List of record labels
