= List of record labels: A–H =

This is a list of notable record labels, starting with A–H.

List of record labels
A–H	I–Q	R–Z	0–9

A–H

== A ==
- A Cappella Records
- A&E Records
- A&M Records
- A&M Octone Records
- A-F Records
- A-Musik
- Abbey Records
- Abbott Records
- ABC Music
- ABC Records
- ABKCO Records
- Able Label
- Abnak Records
- Absolutely Kosher Records
- Abstract Logix
- Accent Records (Belgium)
- Accent Records (US)
- Accession Records
- Ace Fu Records
- Ace of Clubs Records
- Ace of Hearts Records (UK)
- Ace of Hearts Records (US)
- Ace Records (United Kingdom)
- Ace Records (United States)
- Ache Records
- Acid Jazz Records
- Aco Records
- Acorn Records
- ACT Music
- Acte Préalable
- Ad Noiseam
- Adam VIII
- Adeline Records
- Adelphi Records
- Aditya Music
- Adjunct Audio
- Advent Records
- Aegean Records
- Aeronaut Records
- AFM Records
- AFO Records
- Aftermath Entertainment
- Aggro Berlin
- Agitprop! Records
- AIP Records
- Airport Route Recordings
- Ajax Records
- Aladdin Records
- Alam El Phan
- Alarma Records
- Albany Records
- Albert Productions
- Alcopop! Records
- Alegre Records
- Alert Records
- Alessa Records
- Alex Tronic Records
- Alfa Matrix
- Alfa Records
- Alias Records
- Alien8 Recordings
- Alive Naturalsound Records
- All the Madmen Records
- All Platinum Records
- All Saints Records
- All Star Records
- Allalom Music
- Allido Records
- Alligator Records
- Almo Sounds
- Almighty Records
- Almost Gold Recordings
- Alpha Pup Records
- Alta Records
- Altarus Records
- Alternative Distribution Alliance
- Alternative Records
- Alternative Tentacles
- AM PM Records
- Amalgam Digital
- Amarillo Records
- Amaru Entertainment
- The Amazing Kornyfone Record Label
- Ambiances Magnétiques
- Ambitiouz Entertainment
- American Gramaphone
- American Modern Recordings
- American Music Records
- American Record Company
- American Record Corporation
- American Recording Productions
- American Recordings
- Amha Records
- Amiga
- Ammor Records
- Amoeba Culture
- Amorfon
- Amos Records
- Amphetamine Reptile Records
- Amplexus
- Amusic
- Amy Records
- Analekta
- Analog Africa
- Anchor Records
- And/oar
- Angel Air Records
- Angel Records
- Angelophone Records
- Angular Recording Corporation
- Anhrefn Records
- AnimeTrax
- Aniplex
- Anjunabeats
- Ankst
- Anna Records
- Another Century Records
- Anova Music
- Antenna
- Anthem Records
- Anti Fade Records
- Anti-
- Anti-Creative Records
- Anticipate Recordings
- Anticon
- Antilles Records
- Antone's Record Label
- AnTrop
- Anxious Records
- Anyway Records
- Anzic Records
- Aozora Records
- Apegenine recordings
- Apex Records
- Aphonia Recordings
- Apollo Records (1928) (U.S.)
- Apollo Records (1944) (U.S.)
- Apollo Records (Belgium)
- Apollo Recordings
- Appian Publications & Recordings
- Applause Records
- Apple Records
- Apt Records
- Aquarius Musikindo
- Aquarius Records (Canada)
- Aquarius Records (Croatia)
- Arabesque Records
- Arbors Records
- Arbutus Records
- Arch Hill Recordings
- Archenemy Record Company
- Archeophone Records
- Architecture Label
- Arcola
- Ardent Records
- Arena Rock Recording Company
- Aretino Records
- Argo Records (UK)
- Argo Records (U.S.)
- Arhoolie Records
- Ariola
- Ariola Japan
- Arion
- Arising Empire
- Arista Nashville
- Arista Records
- Aristocrat Records
- Ark 21 Records
- Armada Music
- Around Us Entertainment
- Artanis Entertainment Group
- Artemis Records
- Artery Recordings
- Artificial Sun (Russian label)
- Artist Partner Group
- Artistdirect
- ArtistShare
- Armellodie Records
- Arto Records
- Artoffact Records
- Arts & Crafts Productions
- Arwin Records
- Asbestos Records
- Asian Man Records
- Asphodel Records
- Asthmatic Kitty
- Astor Records
- Astralwerks
- Astro Magnetics
- ASV Records
- Asylum Records
- Atavistic Records
- Atco Records
- ATIC Records
- Atlanta Artists
- Atlantic Jaxx
- Atlantic Records
- Atlantic Records Group
- Atlantic Records Russia
- ATO Records
- Atoll Records
- ATP Recordings
- Attack Records
- Attic Records
- Attrakt
- Atypeek Music
- Au Go Go Records
- Audio Antihero
- Audio Dregs
- Audio Fidelity Records
- AudioGO
- Audiogram
- Audiophile Records
- Audition Records
- AUM Fidelity
- Authentic Records
- Autograph Records
- Autumn Records
- AVA Recordings
- Äva Records
- Avalanche Recordings
- Avang Music
- Avantgarde Music
- Avatar Records (electronic music)
- Avatar Records (various)
- Avco Records
- Average Joes Entertainment
- Avex Inc.
- Avex Trax
- AVI Records
- Aviance Records
- Awakening Music
- AWAL
- Aware Records
- Awareness Records
- Axe Records
- AZ
- Aztec Records
- Azteca Records
- Azuli Records

== B ==
- B-Boy Records
- B-Unique Records
- B Zone
- B.T. Puppy Records
- B2M Entertainment
- Babel Label
- Baby Records (Italy)
- Babygrande Records
- Back Beat Records
- Back Porch Records
- Backstreet Records
- Bad Boy Records
- Bad Taste (Iceland)
- Bad Taste Records (Sweden)
- Badorb.com
- Bakery Music
- Balkan Samba Records
- Balkanton
- Bally Records
- Bamboo (record label)
- Bang Records
- Banner Records
- Bar/None Records
- Baratos Afins
- Barclay
- Barely Breaking Even
- Barking Hoop Recordings
- Barking Pumpkin Records
- Barn Records
- Barnaby Records
- Barrelhouse Records
- Barsuk Records
- Basic Beat Recordings
- Basic Replay
- Basick Records
- Baton Records
- Battery Records (dance)
- Battery Records (hip hop)
- Battle Axe Records
- BBC Records
- BBR Music Group
- BCore Disc
- Beach Street Records
- Bear Family Records
- Bearsville Records
- Beat Factory
- Beatservice Records
- Because Music
- Bedazzled Records
- Bedrock Records
- Bedroom Community
- The Bedtime Record
- Beggars Banquet Records
- Beggars Group
- Beka Records
- Bel-Tone Records
- Believe Music
- Bell Records (1920)
- Bell Records (1940)
- Bell Records (1952)
- Bella Union
- Bellaccord Electro
- Bellaphon Records
- Bellmark Records
- Below Par Records
- Beltona Records
- Beluga Heights Records
- Benbecula Records
- Benson Records
- Berliner Gramophone
- Bertelsmann Music Group
- Beserkley Records
- Best Before Records
- Bet-Car Records
- Beta-lactam Ring Records
- Bethel Music
- Bethlehem Records
- Better Looking Records
- Better Noise Music
- Beverley's
- Beyond Music
- Beyond Records
- Beyond Therapy Records
- B'in Music
- Bibletone Records
- Biddulph Recordings
- Bieler Bros. Records
- Bigtop Records
- Big Bear Records
- Big Beat Records (British record label)
- Big Beat Records (American record label)
- Big Brother Recordings
- Big Cat Records (UK)
- Big Cat Records (U.S. record label)
- Big Dada
- Big Hit Music
- Big Life
- Big Loud
- Big Machine Records
- Big Neck Records
- Big Orange Clown Records
- Big Records
- Big Scary Monsters Recording Company
- Big Time Records
- Big Tree Records
- Big Vin Records
- Bigger Picture Music Group
- Biltmore Records
- Binge Records
- Bingola Records
- Biograph Records
- Biohazzard Records
- Birdman Records
- BIS Records
- bitbird
- Biv 10 Records
- Bizarre Records
- Black & Blue Records
- Black & White Records
- Black and Greene Records
- Black Butter Records
- Blackened Recordings
- Black Hen Music
- Black Hole Recordings
- Black Jays
- Black Jazz Records
- Black Kapital Records
- Black Lion Records
- Black Mark Production
- Black Market Activities
- Black Patti Records
- Black River Entertainment
- Black Saint/Soul Note
- Black Swan Records (US)
- Black Top Records
- The Black Wall Street Records
- Blackground Records
- Blackheart Records
- Blackhouse Records
- Blackout Records
- Blacksmith Records
- Blanco y Negro Records
- Blast First
- Blaze Records
- BLIGHT. Records
- Blind Pig Records
- Blix Street Records
- Block Entertainment
- Block Starz Music
- Blockberry Creative
- Blocks Recording Club
- Blonde Vinyl
- Blood and Fire
- Blood and Ink Records
- Bloodline Records
- Bloodshot Records
- Blowtorch Records (Ireland)
- Blow Up Records
- Blue Amberol Records
- Blue Beat Records
- Blue Cat Records
- Blue Coast Records
- Blue Corn Music
- Blue Dog Records
- Blue Goose Records
- Blue Horizon
- Blue Jordan Records
- Blue Lake Records
- The Blue Note Label Group
- Blue Note Records
- Blue Plate Music
- Blue Rock Records
- Blue Room Released
- Blue Sky Records
- Blue Thumb Records
- Bluebell Records
- Bluebird Records
- Blues Beacon Records
- BlueSanct Records
- Bluesville Records
- BluesWay Records
- BMG Heritage Records
- BMG Music Canada
- BMG Rights Management
- BNA Records
- Boardwalk Records
- BOMP! Records
- Boner Records
- Bong Load Records
- Bongo BD
- Bonsound
- Bonzai Records
- Boompa Records
- Boomtown Records
- Bop Cassettes
- Boy Better Know
- BPM Entertainment
- Bradley's Records
- Brain Records
- Brainfeeder
- Brand New Music
- Brassland Records
- Brave Entertainment
- Brave Wave Productions
- Bravo Musique
- Breakbeat Kaos
- Breezeway Records
- Bridge 9 Records
- Bridge Records
- Bright Antenna Records
- Brille Records
- Broadcast Twelve Records
- Broadmoor Records
- Broadway Records (1920s)
- Broadway Records (1947)
- Broadway Records (2012)
- Broken Records
- Bronze Records
- Bros Music
- Brother Records
- Brownswood Recordings
- Brunswick Records
- Brushfire Records
- Brutal Panda Records
- Bruton Music
- BTNH Worldwide
- Buda Musique
- Buddah Records
- Buddyhead Records
- Bulb Records
- Bullet Records
- Bumstead Records
- Bungalo Records
- Bureau B
- Burger Records
- Burgundy Records
- Burning Heart Records
- Burnt Toast Vinyl
- Busted Flat Records
- Busy Bee
- Butterfly Recordings
- Butterz
- BYG Records
- BYO Records

== C ==
- C-JeS Studios
- C/Z Records
- Cactus Jack Records
- Cadence Jazz Records
- Cadence Records
- Cadet Records
- Caedmon Audio
- Caff Records
- Calabash Music
- Caldo Verde Records
- Caltex Records
- CAM Entertainment
- CAM Jazz
- Cameo-Kid
- Cameo-Parkway Records
- Cameo Records
- Camp Records
- Canaan Records
- Canadian-American Records
- Candid Records
- Candle Records
- Candlelight Records
- Candy Ass Records
- CandyRat Records
- Cantaloupe Music
- Cantora Records
- Canyon Records
- Capital Artists
- Capitol Hill Music
- Capitol Christian Music Group
- Capitol Latin
- Capitol Music Group
- Capitol Music Group Sweden
- Capitol Records
- Capitol Records Nashville
- Capricorn Records
- Captain Oi! Records
- Captains of Industry
- Captured Tracks
- Cardinal Records (1920s)
- Cardinal Records (1950s)
- Cardinal Records (1964)
- Cargo Music
- Cargo Records (Canada)
- Cargo Records (UK)
- Caribou Records
- Carisch
- Carl Lindström Company
- Carlton Records
- Carnival Records (US labels)
- Carnival Records (UK label)
- Caroline Records
- Carpark Records
- Carrere Records
- El Cartel Records
- Carved Records
- Casablanca Records
- Cash Money Records
- Cash Records
- Cashville Records
- Castle Communications
- Cat Records (Atlantic)
- Cat Records (TK label)
- Catbird Records
- Catfish Records
- Caustic Eye Productions
- Cavalier Records
- Cavetone Records
- Cavity Search Records
- CBC Records
- CBS Records (2006)
- CBS Records International (Columbia)
- CD Choice
- CD Vision
- Cedille Records
- Celestial Recordings
- Celluloid Records
- Celtic Music
- Celtophile Records
- Centaur Records
- Centricity Music
- Century Media Records
- Century Record Manufacturing Company
- Century Records
- Chainsaw Records
- Chalfont Records
- Chalice
- Challenge Records (1920s)
- Challenge Records (1950s-60s label)
- Challenge Records (1994)
- Chameleon
- Chamillitary Entertainment
- Champion Records (Richmond, Indiana)
- Champion Records (Nashville, Tennessee)
- Champion Records (UK)
- Chance Records
- Chancellor Records
- Chandos Records
- Channel Classics Records
- Chapel Music
- Chappelle and Stinnette Records
- Chapter Music
- Charisma Records
- Charly Records
- Chart Records
- Ché Trading
- Checker Records
- Cheetah Records
- Chelsea Records
- Chemikal Underground
- Cherry Red Records
- CherryDisc Records
- Chesky Records
- Chess Records
- Chi-Sound Records
- Chiaroscuro Records
- Chief Records
- Chimney Sweep Records
- China Record Corporation
- China Records
- Chiswick Records
- Chocolate City (Nigeria)
- Chocolate City Records (US)
- Chop Shop Records
- Chopper City Records
- Christian Faith Recordings
- Chrome Entertainment
- Chrysalis Records
- Chunksaah Records
- Church Road Records
- CI Entertainment
- CI Records
- CIMP
- Cinematic Music Group
- Cinepoly Records
- Cinevox
- Cinnamon Toast Records
- Cinq Music Group
- Circle Records (US)
- Circle Records (Germany)
- Circus Records
- City Centre Offices
- City Records
- City Slang
- Civilians (Record Label)
- Claddagh Records
- Clan Celentano
- Class Records
- Classic Produktion Osnabrück
- Classics Club
- Claves Records
- Clay Records
- Clean Feed Records
- Clef Records
- Cleopatra Records
- Cleveland International Records
- Clickpop Records
- CLJ Records
- Clover Records
- Cloud Recordings
- CLS Music
- Clubbo Records
- CMC International
- CNR Music
- Cobblestone Records
- Cobra Records
- Cocoon Recordings
- Codiscos
- Coed Records
- Cold Chillin' Records
- Cold Meat Industry
- Cold Spring
- Colgems Records
- Collectables Records
- Collector Records
- Collins Classics
- Colonial Records
- Colpix Records
- Colossus Records
- Columbia Graphophone Company
- Columbia Masterworks Records
- Columbia Records
- Combat Records
- Come Organisation
- Comedy Central Records
- Command Records
- Commodore Records
- Communion Music
- Compadre Records
- Compass Records
- Composers Recordings, Inc.
- Compo Company
- Compost Records
- Compuphonic
- Concert Artist Recordings
- Concert Hall Society
- Concord
- Concord Jazz
- Concord Music Group
- Concord Records
- The Conglomerate Entertainment
- Connoisseur Society
- Conqueror Records
- Conspiracy Music
- Constellation Records (Canada)
- Constellation Records (Chicago)
- Constellation Records (Solar)
- Contemode
- Contemporary Records
- Continental Records
- The Control Group
- Convivium Records
- Cook Records
- Cooking Vinyl (UK)
- Cooltempo Records
- COP International
- Copenhagen Records
- Copper Creek Records
- Coral Records
- Cordless Recordings
- Coridel Entertainment
- Corona Records
- Coronet Records
- Corporate Punishment Records
- Corpus Christi Records
- Cosmos Music Group
- Cotillion Records
- Counter Intuitive Records
- Count Your Lucky Stars Records
- Country Turtle Records
- Cowboy Records
- CP Music Group
- Craft Recordings
- Crammed Discs
- Crank! A Record Company
- Crass Records
- Crave Records
- CRD Records
- Cream Records
- Creation Records
- Creative Vibes
- Credential Recordings
- Creeping Bent
- Les Disques du Crépuscule
- Creole Records
- Crescent Records
- Crest Records
- Cricket Records
- Criminal IQ Records
- Crimson Records
- Criss Cross Jazz
- Croatia Records
- Cross Movement Records
- Crown Records
- Crunchy Frog Records
- Crustacean Records
- Cruz Records
- Crydamoure
- Crypt Records
- Cryptogramophone Records
- Crystalate Manufacturing Company
- CTE World
- CTI Records
- Cub Records
- Cube Entertainment
- Cube Records
- Cuca Records
- Cult Records
- Culture Press
- Cumberland Records
- Cuneiform Records
- Curb Records
- Curling Legs
- Curtom Records
- Custard Records
- Custom Records
- Cybele Records
- Cypress Records

== D ==
- D Records
- D.P.G. Recordz
- Daffodil Records (American label)
- Daffodil Records (Canadian label)
- Dallas Records
- Dais Records
- Damaged Goods
- Damnably
- Damon Records
- Dana Records
- Dance Mania
- Dance Nation
- Dance to the Radio
- Dancing Cat Records
- Dancing Ferret
- Dandelion Records
- Danger Crue Records
- Dangerbird Records
- Dangerhouse Records
- Danse Macabre Records
- Daptone Records
- Dark Horse Records
- Darkest Labyrinth
- Darla Records
- Dawn Raid Entertainment
- Dawn Records (UK)
- Dawn Records (American label)
- Daylight Records
- DB Records
- dBpm Records
- DC-Jam Records
- DCD2 Records
- DCide
- De Luxe Records
- De Wolfe Music
- De-Lite Records
- Dead Oceans
- Dead Reckoning Records
- DeadAir Records
- Deaf Records
- Death Row Records
- Deathlike Silence Productions
- Deathwish Inc.
- Debut Records
- Decca Broadway
- Decca Gold
- Decca Records
- Deceptive Records
- Decibel
- Decon
- Deconstruction Records
- Dedicated Records
- Deep Elm Records
- Deep Shag Records
- Deep Soul Records
- Deewee
- Def Jam Africa
- Def Jam Recordings
- Def Jam South
- Defected Records
- Defiance Records
- Definitive Jux
- Defstar Records
- Dekema Records
- Del-Fi Records
- Delerium Records
- Delicious Deli Records
- Delicious Vinyl
- Delmark Records
- Delphine Records
- Delphian Records
- Deltasonic
- Deluxe Records
- Demon Music Group
- Denon Records
- Denovali Records
- Dented Records
- Discos y Cintas Denver
- Dependent Music
- Dependent Records
- Deram Records
- Derby Records
- Derrty Entertainment
- Desert Storm Records
- DeSoto Records
- Desto Records
- Deutsche Grammophon
- Deutsche Harmonia Mundi
- Deviant Records
- Dew Process
- Dewdrops Records
- DFA Records
- DFTBA Records
- DGC Records
- Dial Records (1946)
- Dial Records (1964)
- Dial Records (1999)
- Diamante Music Group
- Diamond Records (New York City)
- Diamond Records (Hong Kong)
- A Different Drum
- Different Recordings
- Digital Distribution Netherlands
- Digital Hardcore Recordings
- DigSin
- Dill Records
- Dim Mak Records
- Dimension Records
- Dine Alone Records
- Dino Entertainment
- Diplomat Records
- Dirtnap Records
- Dirty Hit
- Dirty Records
- Dirtybird Records
- Disa Records
- Dischord Records
- Disciple Records
- Discipline Global Mobile
- Discomagic Records
- Discovery Records
- DiscReet Records
- Diskos
- Diskoton
- Disney Music Group
- Displeased Records
- Disruptor Records
- Distinctive Records
- Distort Entertainment
- Distribution Select
- Disturbing tha Peace
- Diva Records
- DIW Records
- Dixieland Jubilee Records
- DJM Records
- Do It Records
- Doctor Dream Records
- Document Records
- Dog Ear Records
- Dog Meat Records
- Doggy Style Records
- Doghouse Records
- Dolores Recordings
- Dolphin Records (Ireland)
- Dolton Records
- Domino Recording Company (1993)
- Domino Records (1916)
- Domino Records (1924)
- Domino Records (1957)
- Domo Records
- Don Giovanni Records
- Doomtree
- Doré Records
- Dot Dash Recordings
- Dot Records
- Double Shot
- Double-Time Records
- Doublemoon
- Dovecote Records
- Downey Records
- Downtown Records
- Dr. Strange Records
- Drag City
- Dragon Records
- Dragon Mob Records
- Dragon Street Records
- Drakkar Entertainment
- Dramatico
- Dream Chasers Records
- Dream T Entertainment
- Dreamboat Records
- Dreamcatcher Company
- Dreamus
- Dreamusic
- Dreamville Records
- DreamWorks Records
- Dreyfus Records
- Drive-Thru Records
- Driven Music Group
- DRO Records
- DROG Records
- DRT Entertainment
- Drumcode Records
- DSFA Records
- DSN Music
- DSP Media
- DTA Records
- Dualtone Records
- Duck Down Music
- Ductape Records
- Duke Records
- Duke Street Records
- Duna Records
- Dunhill Records
- Dunk Yer Funk Records
- Dunwich Records
- Duophonic Records
- Dureco
- Durium Records (Italy)
- Durium Records (UK)
- DVS Records
- Dynamic
- Dynamica
- DynoVoice Records
- Difosa

== E ==
- E.G. Records
- Eagle Records
- Eagle Rock Entertainment
- Earache Records
- Eardrum Records
- earMUSIC
- Earwig Music Company
- East Meets West Music
- East Side Digital Records
- East West Records
- Eastern Conference Records
- Eastlawn Records
- Eastworld
- Easy Star Records
- The Echo Label
- Eclipse Records
- ECM Records
- Ecstatic Peace!
- Ecstatic Yod
- Ed Banger Records
- Edel-Mega Records
- Edel SE & Co. KGaA
- Edelweiss Emission
- Edgeout Records
- Edison Bell
- Edison Records
- Edition Lilac
- Edition Records
- Eenie Meenie Records
- Eerie Materials
- EFM Records
- EggHunt Records
- EGREM
- Eibon Records
- Ekko Records
- Ektaar Music
- él Records
- Élan Recordings
- Electric Honey
- Electrecord
- Electrola
- Elefant Records
- Elefant Traks
- Elektra Records
- Element 9
- Elenco
- Elephant 6
- Eleven: A Music Company
- eleveneleven
- Elypsia Records
- Em:t Records
- Emanem Records
- EmArcy Records
- Embassy Records
- Embryo Records
- Emerald Music
- Emerald Records (2000s)
- Emergency Records
- Emerson Records
- EMI
- EMI-Capitol Special Markets
- EMI America Records
- EMI Classics
- EMI Hemisphere
- EMI Music Australia
- EMI Music Japan
- EMI Music Malaysia
- EMI Music Poland
- EMI Records
- EMI Televisa Music
- EMP Label Group
- Emperor Jones
- Emperor Norton Records
- Empire Distribution
- Empire Mates Entertainment
- End All Life Productions
- End Records
- The End Records
- Endearing Records
- Enemy Records
- Energy Rekords
- Enigma Records
- Enja Records
- Enjoy Records
- Ensign Records
- Enzyme Records
- Epic Records
- Epic Records Japan
- Epic Soundtrax
- Epitaph Records
- Equal Vision Records
- Equator Records (Canada)
- Equator Records (Kenya)
- Equity Music Group
- Era Records
- Erased Tapes Records
- Erato Records
- Eros Music
- Ersatz Audio
- ersguterjunge
- Erskine Records
- Erstwhile Records
- Eskaton
- ESL Music
- ESP-Disk
- Esquimaux Management
- Esquire Records (Australia)
- Esquire Records (UK)
- Essential Records (Christian)
- Essential Records (London)
- Essex Records
- Estonian Record Productions
- Estrus Records
- Eternal Records
- Eulogy Recordings
- Europa
- Everest Records
- Everloving Records
- Excello Records
- Excelsior Recordings
- Exclusive Records
- Executive Music Group
- Exercise1 Recordings
- Exit Records
- Exploding in Sound
- Extasy Records
- Extensive Music
- Extreme Records
- Eye Q
- Eyeball Records

== F ==
- F-Beat Records
- F-IRE Collective
- F-Stop Music
- Facedown Records
- Factory Records
- Fader Label
- Failsafe Records
- Fair Trade Services
- Falcon Records (Canadian label)
- Falcon Records (Texas)
- Fall of the West Records
- Falling A Records
- Family Tree Records
- Fanfare Records
- Fania Records
- Fantagio
- Fantastic Plastic Records
- Fantasy Records
- Far Out Recordings
- Fascination Records
- Fast Product
- Fat Possum Records
- Fat Wreck Chords
- FatCat Records
- Father/Daughter Records
- Faultline Records
- Favored Nations
- FAX +49-69/450464
- F Communications
- Fearless Records
- Federal Records
- Fellside Recordings
- Felsted Records
- Fence Records
- Fenway Recordings
- Ferret Music
- Fervent Records
- Fervor Records
- Festival Distribution
- Festival Records (Australia)
- Festival Records (American label)
- Fetish Records
- Fever Records
- Fflach
- FFRR Records
- Fiction Records
- Fiddler Records
- Fierce Angel
- Fierce Panda Records
- Fifth Colvmn Records
- Figure IV Entertainment
- Film Score Monthly
- Finger Lickin' Records
- Fingerprint Records
- Fire Records (Pakistan)
- Fire Records (UK)
- Fire Records (U.S.)
- Firebox Records
- First Avenue Records
- First Priority Music
- First Terrace Records
- FiXT
- Flair Records
- Flameshovel Records
- Flashover Recordings
- Flashpoint Music
- Flawless Records
- Fledg'ling Records
- Flemish Eye
- The Flenser
- Flicker Records
- Flip Records (1950s)
- Flip Records (1994)
- Floodgate Records
- Flow Music
- Fly Eye Records
- Fly Records
- Flying Dutchman Records
- Flying Fish Records
- Flying Nun Records
- Flying Tart
- FlyingDog
- Flyright Records
- FMC Music
- FMP/Free Music Production
- FMR Records
- FNC Entertainment
- Focus Group Holdings Limited
- Fog City Records
- Fogarty's Cove Music
- Folk-Legacy Records
- Folkways Records
- Fonal Records
- Fondle 'Em Records
- Fonotipia Records
- Fonovisa Records
- Fontana Distribution
- Fontana North
- Fontana Records
- Food Records
- Fool's Gold Records
- Fools of the World
- The Ford Plant
- ForeFront Records
- Fort Knocks Entertainment
- Fortuna Pop!
- Fortune Records
- Four Music
- Fourth Dimension Records
- Fowl Records
- Fox Music
- Fractured Transmitter Recording Company
- Fraternity Records
- FRE Records
- Freak Recordings
- Fred Records
- Free Dirt Records
- Free-Will
- Freebandz
- Freedom From
- Freedom (Hollywood)
- Freedom Records (London)
- Freedom Records (Houston-based label)
- Freeworld Entertainment
- Frenchkiss Records
- Fresh Records (UK)
- Fresh Records (US)
- Fresh Sounds Records
- Fried Egg Records
- Friendly Fire Recordings
- Fringe Product
- Frog Records
- Front Line
- Frontier Records
- Frontiers Music
- Frontline Records
- Fruits de Mer Records
- Fuel 2000
- Fueled by Ramen
- Discos Fuentes
- Full Moon Productions
- Full Moon Records
- Full Surface Records
- Full Time Hobby
- Fullsteam Records
- Funk Volume
- Funtrip Records
- Fury Records
- Fusion Records
- Future Classic
- Future Farmer Records
- Future House Music
- Future Records (UK)
- Future Records (Iceland)
- Fysisk Format

== G ==
- G-Funk Entertainment
- G-Series
- G-Unit Records
- G7 Welcoming Committee Records
- Galaxy Records
- Galilee of the Nations
- Galileo Records
- Gallo Record Company
- Gamma
- Gan-Shin
- Gangsta Advisory Records
- Gazell
- Gearhead Records
- Gee Records
- Gee Street Records
- Geffen Records
- General Records
- Genie Music
- Genie Records
- Genjing Records
- Gennett Records
- Geoma Records
- Gern Blandsten Records
- Get Low Recordz
- Get Physical Music
- Ghetto Ruff
- Ghost Box Records
- Ghostly International
- Giant Electric Pea
- Giant Records (independent)
- Giant Records (Warner)
- Giant Step
- Gigantic Music
- Gingerbread Man Records
- Giorno Poetry Systems
- Giza Studio
- Glasgow Underground Recordings
- Glass Records
- Glitterhouse Records
- Global Music Group
- Global Records
- Glurp Records
- GMA Music
- GMM Grammy
- GMT Records
- GNP Crescendo Records
- Go! Discs
- Go-Feet Records
- Go-Kart Records
- Gold Castle Records
- Gold Mind Records
- Gold Mountain Records
- Gold Robot Records
- Gold Standard Laboratories
- Gold Star Records
- Gold Typhoon
- Golden Era Records
- Golden Records
- Golden World Records
- Goldenrod Records
- The Goldmind Inc.
- Goldwax Records
- Gone Records
- Goner Records
- Good Hands Records
- Good Looking Records
- GOOD Music
- Good Records
- Good Time Jazz Records
- Good to Die Records
- Good Vibrations
- Gooom Disques
- GospoCentric Records
- Gotee Records
- Gourd Music
- Grafton Entertainment
- Gramavision Records
- Gramm
- Gramophone Company
- Granary Music
- Grand Award Records
- Grand Central Records
- Grand Hustle Records
- Grand Production
- Grand Royal
- Grapefruit
- Grapetree Records
- Grappa Musikkforlag
- Grateful Dead Records
- Graveface Records
- Gravitas Recordings
- Gravity Records
- Great Big Mouth Records
- Greedhead Music
- Green Cookie Records
- Green Linnet Records
- Greensleeves Records
- Greentrax Recordings
- Gregmark Records
- Grenadine Records
- Grey Gull Records
- Greyday Productions
- Griffin Music
- Gringo Records
- Griselda Records
- Grönland Records
- Groove Records
- Groove Production
- GRP Records
- Grrr Records
- GRT Records
- Grunt Records
- GTO Records
- Guerilla Records
- Guided Missile
- Gulcher Records
- GUN Records
- Gusto Records
- Gut Records
- GWR Records

== H ==
- H & L Records
- HaHaHa Production
- Half a Cow
- Hallucination Recordings
- Hamburg Records
- Hamilton Records
- Hammer Records
- Hammerheart Records
- Hammock Music
- Hand Drawn Dracula
- Handsome Boy Records
- Hangars Liquides
- Hannibal Records
- Hansa Records
- Hanson Records
- Häpna
- Happy Couples Never Last
- Happy Happy Birthday to Me Records
- Happy Tiger Records
- HappySad Records
- Hardwood Records
- Harlekijn
- Harmonia Mundi
- Harmony Records
- Harriet Records
- Harthouse
- Harvest Records
- Hassle Records
- Hatchet House
- Hat Hut Records
- Headhunter Records
- Hear Music
- Heard Well
- Heart Warming
- Heartbeat Productions
- Heartbeat Records
- Heaven Music
- Heavenly Recordings
- Hed Arzi Music
- Hedkandi
- Hefty Records
- Heist or Hit Records
- Helicon
- Hell, etc.
- Hellcat Records
- Hellhound Records
- Helium 3
- Hello CD of the Month Club
- Hello Cleveland!
- Hep-Me Records
- Her Royal Majesty's Records
- Herald AV Publications
- Herald Records
- Heritage Records (England)
- Hermes Records
- Herwin Records
- Hi-n-Dry
- Hi Records
- Hib-Tone
- Hickory Records
- Hidden Beach Recordings
- Hieroglyphics Imperium Recordings
- High Dive Records
- High Life Music
- High Street Records
- High Water Recording Company
- Higher Octave Music
- Higher State
- Highland Records
- Highline Entertainment
- HighTone Records
- Hiljaiset Levyt
- Hillsong Music
- HIM International Music
- Hip Records
- Hip-O Records
- Hippos in Tanks
- Hipposonic Studios
- His Master's Voice
- Hispavox
- Historic Masters
- Historical Records
- Hit of the Week Records
- Hobbledehoy Record Co.
- Holiday Inn Records
- Holiday Records
- Hollywood Records
- Holy Roar Records
- Home Sweet Home Records
- Homespun Records
- Homestead Records (1980s)
- Homestead Records (1920s)
- Honest Don's Records
- Honest Jon's
- Hoo-Bangin' Records
- Hooj Choons
- Hope Music Group
- Hopeless Records
- HopeStreet Recordings
- Hor Music
- Horizon Records
- Horo Records
- Hospital Productions
- Hospital Records
- HOSS Records
- Hostess Entertainment
- Hot Wax Records
- Hotflush Recordings
- Hudson Records
- Hugpatch Records
- Human Imprint
- Humming Bird Records
- Hungaroton
- Hush Records
- Disques Hushush
- Hut Records
- Hybe Corporation
- Hybris
- Hydra Entertainment
- Hydra Head Records
- Hyperdub
- Hyperion Records
- Hyperium Records
- Hypertek Digital
- Hypnotize Minds

== See also ==
- List of electronic music record labels
- List of independent UK record labels
- List of Bangladeshi record labels
