= La Loi de la nature =

La loi de la nature
- Cover art for La loi de la nature

Studio album by Dynastie Le Tigre
- Released: May 30, 2015; May 26, 2016 _{(Deluxe)}
- Recorded: 2015
- Genre: Afropop, Afrobeat, R&B
- Length: 52:36
- Label: Tiger Prod; Hope Music Group
- Producer: Executive producer: Cedric Biyong Edimengo

Dynastie Le Tigre chronology
Totopiii (2013)	La loi de la nature (00000001)

Singles from La loi de la nature
- 1. "Prend soin d'elle" Released: 2015; 2. "Joue Moi Le Mendjang" Released: 2015; 3. "Juste Un Peu {{sub [ feat (X-Maleya)}}" Released: 2016; 4. "Dingue de toi" Released: 2016

La loi de la nature is an album that was released by the Cameroonian singer Dynastie Le Tigre on May 30, 2015, worldwide. A deluxe version of the album was released worldwide on May 26, 2016, by Tiger Prod and was marketed & distributed by Hope Music Group. The album is a walk of more than an hour in the heart of African rhythms revisited and modernized by Dynastie and his Dynastie family orchestration. Thereby emerge new musical variations such the Kwatt'nB & the Neo Bikutsi. Alongside these crossbreeding, Dynastie browsed through new genres from elsewhere as Afropop and even R&B.

It has 15 tracks with diverse inspirations from R&B to Afropop to Afrobeat;Many collaborations are found in the album some with young rising Cameroonians stars Michael Kiessou, X-Maleya, Stanley Enow, Moustik Le Krismatik ). Top Cameroonian music producers such as Mister Kriss, Lucky +2 and musicians like Ben Bass, Michel Mbarga also worked on the album. The main tracks were recorded in Ghetto Music Studios (Messa, Yaoundé) and Ndoumbe Studios (Nlongkak, Yaoundé); mixed and mastered by Christophe Avom.

== Background ==
In 2015, after winning several awards, Dynastie returned working to studios and focusing on his new music. Produced by DJ Kriss, Prend soin d'elle was released on May 30, 2015, and became the first single from the album. Dynastie through the video concept, honored the good willing of catering women and to taking care of daily . To support this move, Dynastie also paid tribute to the famous Sam Fan Thomas's "Makassi dance" . The video was directed by Mr Adrenalyne and world exclusive premier on the Jambo show of Canal 2 International the 23 May 2015 and YouTube on May 30, 2015.

== Track listing ==
La loi de la nature
No.	Title	Writer(s)	Producer(s)	Length
1.	"Joue Moi Le Mendjang"	Cedric Biyong	Lucky +2	5:04
2.	"Dingue de toi"	Cedric Biyong	Salatiel	4:10
3.	"Mani Kaaaka"	Cedric Biyong	Mister Kriss	4:12
4.	"Juste Un Peu" (feat X-maleya)	Cedric Biyong, Roger Samnick	Mister Kriss	3:47
5.	"Sort De La Cuisine" (feat Moustik Le Krismatik)	Cedric Biyong, Hubert Tagne M.T.	Mister Kriss	4:51
6.	"KDT" (feat Michael Kiessou, Yvich)	Yves Kwa, Cedric Biyong, Michael Kiessou	Mister Kriss, Yvich	3:59
7.	"Hommage a papa & mama"	Cedric Biyong	Mister kriss	6:14
8.	"Prend soin d'elle rmx" (feat Papou)	Cedric Biyong, Papou	Mister kriss	3:55
9.	"Daddy daddy" (feat Mimi Pary)	Cedric Biyong, Mireille Bayi	Mister Kriss	3:41
10.	"Je Confirme"	Cedric Biyong	Mister Kriss	4:35
11.	"Sida"	Cedric Biyong	Mister kriss	5:30
12.	"Prend soin d'elle" (feat Stanley Enow)	Cedric Biyong, Stanley Enow	Mister kriss	5:00

Bonus tracks
No.	Title	Writer(s)	Producer(s)	Length
13.	"Ma femme"	Cedric Biyong	Mister kriss	3:41
14.	"Wokoloo"	Cedric Biyong	Cedric Biyong	6:22
15.	"La Vie Eternelle"	Cedric Biyong	Cedric Biyong	5:23
