= Partage (EP) =

2014 studio album by Michael Kiessou

- Cover art for Partage EP

Studio album by Michael Kiessou
- Released: April 2, 2014; August 1, 2015 _{(Deluxe)}; December 19, 2015 _{(Collector)}
- Recorded: 2012–2015
- Genres: Afropop, Bend-skin, Afrobeats, Electronic dance music
- Length: 52:36
- Labels: Hope Music Group; The Orchard (company) Sony Music
- Producers: Executive producers: Philippe Nkouaya; Anacle Michael Ghounam Kiessou

Michael Kiessou chronology
Partage (00000001)	Nomtema (2016)

Singles from Partage
- 1. "Demoiselle" Released: 2012; 2. "Abele" Released: 2013; 3. "Bennam" Released: 2013; 4. "Tourner les reins" Released: 2014; 5. "Wopalilo" Released: 2015; 6. "Lomdie" Released: 2015

Partage is an album that was released by the Cameroonian singer Michael Kiessou on April 2, 2014, worldwide. A deluxe version of the EP was released worldwide on August 29, 2015, and was distributed by Sony Music Entertainment via The Orchard (company). The EP is a walk of more than an hour in the heart of African rhythms revisited and modernized by Michael and his team Kiessou orchestration. Thereby emerge new musical variations such the Kwatt'nB & the Neo Bend-skin. Alongside these crossbreeding, Michael browsed through new genres from elsewhere as Afropop and even Electronic dance music.

It has 15 tracks with diverse inspirations from Bend-skin to Afropop to Afrobeats. Many collaborations are found in the album some with young rising Cameroonians stars (Locko, C-Prime, Edel Koula, Nigerians). Top Cameroonian music producers such as Philjohn, Mister Kriss, Bill Nyame and musicians like Christian Obam, Ben Bass, Michel Mbarga also worked on the EP. The main tracks were recorded in Ghetto Music Studios (Messa, Yaoundé) and Believe Reocordz (Cité Sic, Douala); mixed and mastered by Christophe Avom.

== Background ==
In 2013 after signing to Hope Music Group, Michael returned working to studios and focusing on his new music. Produced by Philjohn, Abele was released on July 17, 2013, and became the first single from the EP. Michael through the video concept, honored the festive movement found in Littoral Region (Cameroon) marked a happy event. To support this move, Michael also paid tribute to the famous Sam Fan Thomas's "Makassi dance" . The video was directed by NS Pictures and world exclusive premier on the Jambo show of Canal 2 International the 28 July 2013 and YouTube on August 3, 2013.

== Track listing ==
Partage
No.	Title	Writer(s)	Producer(s)	Length
1.	"Intro"	A.G.Michael Kiessou	Philjohn	1:02
2.	"Abele"	A.G Michael Kiessou	Philjohn	3:49
3.	"Bennam"	A.G Michael Kiessou; Philippe Nkouaya; Yves Daniel Kwa	Philjohn	3:43
4.	"Demoiselle" (featuring Edel Koula)	Alexandre Ndoumbe; A.G Michael Kiessou; Edel Koula	Bill Nyame	3:39
5.	"Louons l'eternel"	A.G Michael Kiessou	Philjohn, Mister Kriss	3:44
6.	"Demoiselle remix" (featuring Philjohn)	Alexandre Ndoumbe, A.G Michael Kiessou	Philjohn	3:29
7.	"Abele karaoke"	A.G Michael Kiessou	Philjohn	3:49
8.	"Outro"	A.G Michael Kiessou	Philjohn	0:45

Deluxe Edition
No.	Title	Writer(s)	Producer(s)	Length
9.	"Sauter sauter"	A.G Michael Kiessou	Philjohn	2:44
10.	"Wopalilo" (C'Prime)	A.G Michael Kiessou; Daville Primong	Philjohn	3:17
11.	"Tourner les reins"	A.G Michael Kiessou; Yves Daniel Kwa; Philippe Nkouaya	Philjohn	3:47
12.	"Lomdie" (Locko)	A.G Michael Kiessou; Charles Arthur Locko Samba	Philjohn	3:47
13.	"Abele (EDM Remix)" (Philjohn)	A.G Michael Kiessou	Philjohn	1:38
14.	"Wopalilo karaoke"	A.G Michael Kiessou	Philjohn	2:48

Bonus tracks
No.	Title	Writer(s)	Producer(s)	Length
15.	"Partage Mix Live Show" (DJ Valere)	A.G Michael Kiessou	Philjohn	14:13
