= Love Da Records =

British record label

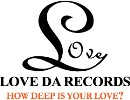
- Type: Music Record Distribution
- Industry: Music
- Founded: 1998
- Headquarters: Hong Kong
- Key people: Tommy Chan (Founder)
- Website: Love Da Records

Love Da Records is an international record label founded in 1998. The label is one of the largest indie music distributors in South East Asia, distributing over 150 individual labels covering music of different genres. With its headquarters in Hong Kong, Love Da Records also extended its branches to Taiwan, Singapore and Malaysia.

Record labels represented by Love Da Records include Beggars Group, 4AD, XL Recordings, Rough Trade Records, Warp Records, Ninja Tune, V2 Records, PIAS, Wall of Sound, !K7, Kitsuné Musique, Ministry of Sound, Hed Kandi and more.

Among its most famous artists under the company's representing labels are the Radiohead, The Prodigy, Nouvelle Vague, Tiësto, Vampire Weekend, Brett Anderson, Carla Bruni, Bloc Party, Grace Jones, Crystal Castles, Travis and Phoenix.

As an event promoter, Love Da Records has also organised concerts with Nouvelle Vague, Suzanne Vega and Télépopmusik, as well as the Kitsuné Club Nights series, bringing "quality music to the people".

== Labels ==
- 4AD
- Azuli Records
- BBE
- Beggars Group
- Bella Union
- Café del Mar
- Chall'o Music
- Chemikal Underground
- Cooking Vinyl
- Cooperative Music
- Defected Records
- Different Records
- Discograph Records
- Ever Records
- Fabric Discography
- Fat Cat Records
- Fierce Angel
- George V
- Get Physical Music
- Global Underground
- Hed Kandi
- Intergroove
- !K7
- Kitsuné Musique
- Koch Records
- Last Gang Records
- Matador Records
- Memphis Industries
- Ministry of Sound
- Naïve Records
- Ninja Tune
- One Little Indian Records
- Peacefrog Records
- PIAS
- Pschent Music
- Rapster Records
- Rough Trade Records
- Seamless Records
- Secretly Canadian
- Soma Records
- Sonar Kollektiv
- Southern Fried Records
- Stefano Cecchi Records
- Strictly Rhythm
- Strut Records
- The Perfect Kiss Records
- Too Pure
- Touch and Go Records
- Tru Thoughts
- United Recordings
- Union Square Music
- V2 Records
- Wagram Music
- Wall of Sound
- Warp Records
- Wichita Recordings
- Wiiija
- XL Recordings
- Ya Basta Records
