= AudioLock =

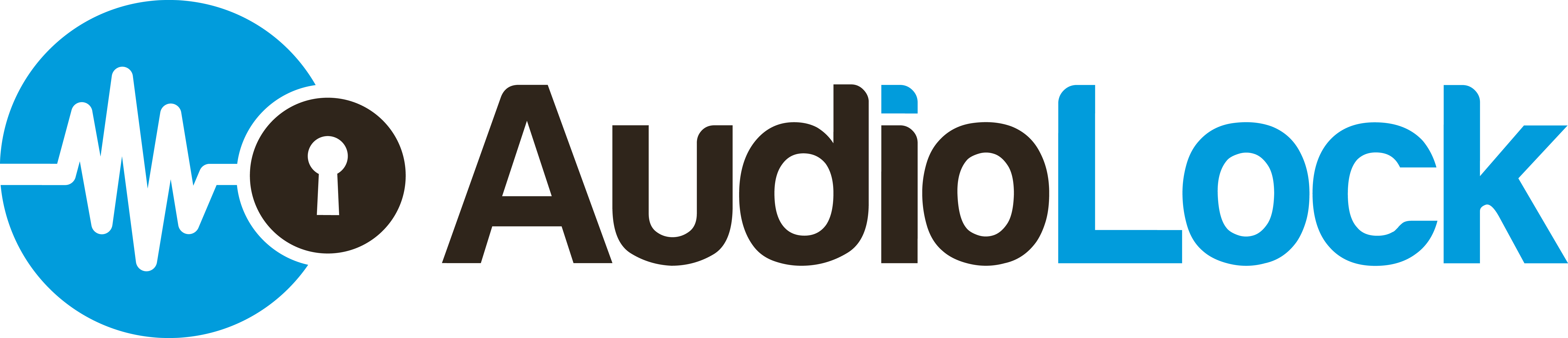
- Company type: Private
- Industry: Anti-piracy
- Founded: 2010
- Founder: Ben Rush
- Headquarters: London, UK
- Area served: Worldwide
- Products: Digital watermarking and anti-piracy
- Website: www.audiolock.net

AudioLock is a music-specific anti-piracy service founded in 2010 by former DJ and electronic music producer Ben Rush. AudioLock specialises in the automated removal of infringing music content, using DMCA notices, across search engines Google, Yahoo, Bing and Yandex as well as cyberlockers, torrent sites, Usenet, SoundCloud, YouTube, Dailymotion, file search engines, VK, Facebook, Twitter and other social media sites. Digital watermarking is also used for the sending of promotional copies of the music in digital form to prevent pre-release leaks and detect their origin if distributed.

== Partnerships and memberships ==
AudioLock is a member of the American Association of Independent Music (A2IM), the Association of Independent Music (AIM) and the Association For Electronic Music (AFEM). It is also partnered with numerous digital service providers, Trade association and distributors including; Traxsource, Believe Digital, Music Publishers Association (MPA) and !K7

== Education and Public Speaking ==
AudioLock offer education on the subject of music anti-piracy to the public and the wider music industry through its public speaking engagements and ambassador program.

=== On the BBC ===
In July 2016 AudioLock CEO Ben Rush was interviewed by BBC Radio 1 for its Newsbeat program to provide specialist insight into pirate download stores and their effect on dance music. Also interviewed were Mark Lawrence from the AFEM and Stuart Knight, Director of Toolroom Records.

=== Public appearances ===
AudioLock have been invited to talk about music anti-piracy an numerous notable industry events. These include:

- XPONorth (Inverness, Scotland June 2016)
- Brighton Music Conference (Brighton, England 2016)
- Import.io Data Summit (London, England 2014)
- Amsterdam Dance Event (Amsterdam 2015)
- International Music Summit (Ibiza 2015 & 2017)
- BPM Pro (Birmingham, England 2016)

In 2013 AudioLock in conjunction with the Association of Independent Music (AIM) held its first Music Piracy Prevention Forum in London. This led to the event being held again in 2015 along with the publication of a white paper: "The Music Anti-Piracy Best Practice Guidelines".

At the 2017 International Music Summit in Ibiza AudioLock chaired the Protect Mental & Physical Health for Fans & Professionals work group which saw him present to Pete Tong and other select industry at a screening of Pioneer and DJ Sound's new documentary on mental health in the music industry. At the same event AudioLock also presented a talk entitled 'Maximising Your Music & Royalties - The New Way'; Looking at a future of free anti-piracy protection and enhanced royalty payments for rights holders at every level.

=== Ambassador program ===
In a bid to extend understanding of music anti-piracy to the wider music community, AudioLock have established an ambassador program made up of thought leaders from across the music industry. These volunteer Ambassadors include entertainment lawyer and former Radio 1 DJ Judge Jules; current owner of Fierce Angel, Mark Doyle; Cafe Mambo Ibiza resident DJ & Award Winning Producer Ridney; DJ, Producer, Festival Organiser, Radio Presenter DJ Doctor Feelgood; and DJs, Producers, YosH Tribe Label founders, FooR.
