= Herb Abramson =

American record executive (1916–1999)

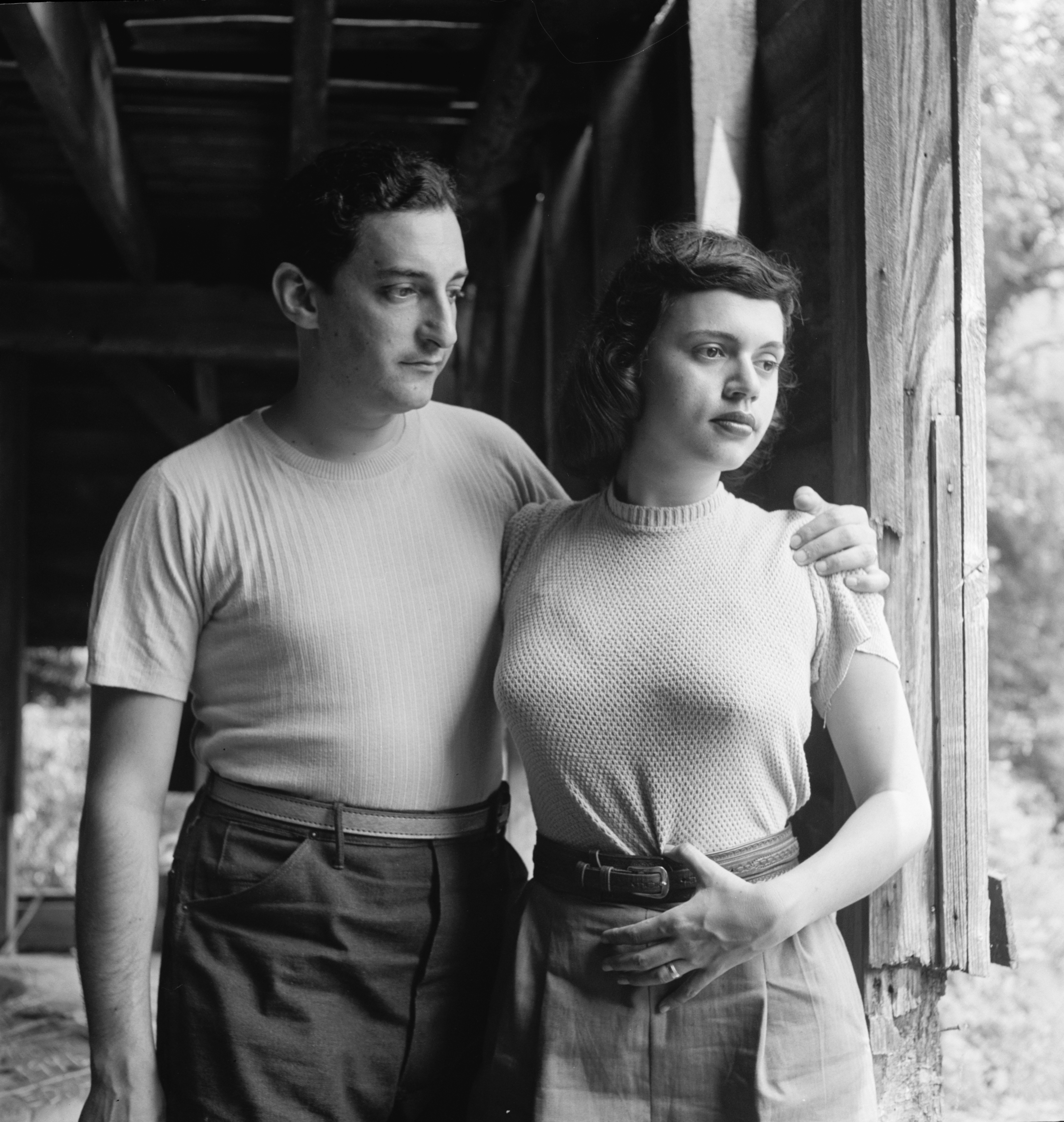
- Abramson and his wife, Miriam Bienstock, c. 1947

Background information
- Born: November 16, 1916; Brooklyn, New York City, U.S.
- Died: November 9, 1999 (aged 82) Henderson, Nevada, U.S.
- Occupations: Record producer, record executive
- Labels: Jubilee, Atlantic, Atco

Herbert Charles Abramson (November 16, 1916 – November 9, 1999) was an American record executive, record producer, and co-founder of Atlantic Records.

== Life and career ==
Abramson was born in 1916 to a Jewish family in Brooklyn, New York, United States. He studied to be a dentist but got a job working for Al Green at National Records, producing: Clyde McPhatter, The Ravens, Billy Eckstine, and Big Joe Turner. He founded Jubilee Records in 1946 with Jerry Blaine, intending to record jazz, R&B, and gospel music. Blaine was having some success recording Jewish novelty songs, but this genre did not interest Abramson, so he sold his interest in Jubilee to Blaine. Abramson and his wife Miriam were close friends with jazz fan Ahmet Ertegun, who recognized Abramson's talent. He approached Abramson with a label proposal, and they founded Atlantic Records in 1947, with Abramson president and Ertegun vice president. Both handled the creative end of the business, and Miriam handled the economics.

In 1953, Abramson was drafted. Jerry Wexler filled in and joined Atlantic as a partner, though Abramson retained the title of president. When Abramson returned from the Army in 1955, he found Atlantic a changed company. Ertegun's brother, Nesuhi, joined Atlantic in 1955 as a partner and was enjoying great success in selling jazz albums. Ertegun and Wexler were recording R&B hits which crossed over into pop. His failing marriage to Miriam would end in divorce. Abramson returned home from Germany with a pregnant girlfriend who became his second wife.

Ahmet Ertegun and Abramson formed Atco Records in 1955 as a division of Atlantic. Abramson effectively ran the label on his own. He found success with The Coasters but was unable to get a hit with Bobby Darin. When he announced that he was dropping Darin from the label, Ertegun recorded three tracks with Darin and two of them turned into hits: "Queen of the Hop" and "Splish Splash". Abramson left Atlantic Records in December 1958, selling his stake in the company for $300,000 to ex-wife Miriam Bienstock, (who married music publisher Freddy Bienstock) and Nesuhi Ertegun. Ahmet Ertegun became president of the company. Abramson started new record labels including Triumph, Blaze, and Festival. His most successful post-Atlantic recording was producing "Hi-Heel Sneakers" by Tommy Tucker (released on Checker Records), still able to compete in the industry as an independent label.

Abramson developed a method of cutting concentric grooves for a record so a different recording could be heard depending on which groove the tonearm landed on. That process was used on a series of "Magic Records" that Abramson produced which were marketed for children. After leaving Atlantic, Abramson sold the patent to Mattel which used the process to develop the Chatty Cathy talking doll.

Abramson set up his own recording studio in the early 1960s, A-1 Sound Studios (Atlantic-1) at 234 West 56th Street in Manhattan. With engineer Jim Reeves he produced: Sidney Barnes, Don Covay, the Darling Sisters, John Davidson, Luther Dixon, J. J. Jackson, Linda and the Vistas, Mr. Wiggles, Johnny Nash, Pigmeat Markham, Ruby & the Romantics, Eddie Singleton, The Supremes, Titus Turner, and the Thymes. He moved A-1 Sound to 76th Street on the ground floor of a hotel off Broadway. Musicians who recorded demos in the studio include: Richie Cordell, Hank Crawford, Barry Manilow, Bette Midler, James Moody, Patti Smith, Les Fradkin and Muddy Waters. The Godz recorded their first three albums at the West 56th Street studio in 1966, 1967 and 1968, and their fourth album at 76th Street in 1973. Jim McCarthy from The Godz also recorded his solo album (Alien) at the 76th Street studio in 1973. Jonathan Thayer, later of Vanguard Recording Studios, engineered for Abramson, as did Rob Fraboni and maintenance engineer Mike Edl, who replaced Carl Lindgren in April 1969. A-1 Sound was managed by his third wife, Barbara, who was with him to the end of his life.

In 1998, he received the Pioneer Award from the Rhythm & Blues Foundation.

He died in Henderson, Nevada, in 1999, at the age of age 82.
