= Miriam Bienstock =

American record executive (1923–2015)

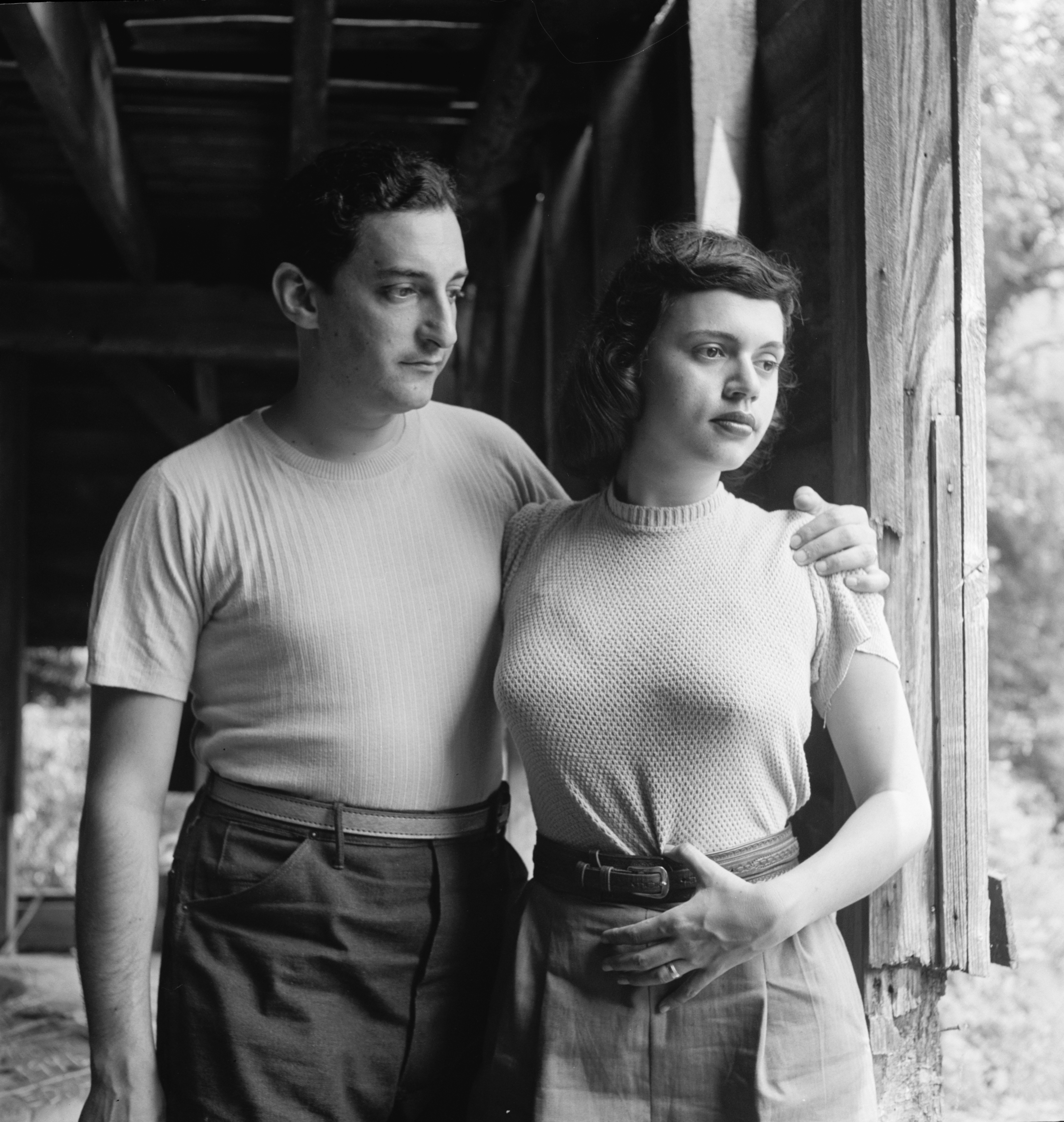
- Miriam with her then-husband Herb Abramson, c. 1947
- Born: January 4, 1923; Brooklyn, NY, U.S.
- Died: March 21, 2015 (aged 92); Manhattan, NY, U.S.
- Education: Brooklyn College
- Occupations: businessperson, theatrical producer

Miriam Bienstock (née Kahan, later Abramson, January 4, 1923 – March 21, 2015) was an American record company executive who was influential in the early days of Atlantic Records, becoming the company's vice president in 1958. She later became a theatrical producer.

== Life and career ==
Miriam Kahan was born in Brooklyn, New York, the daughter of Ukrainian Jewish immigrants Sylvia Brahinsky (from Nizhyn) and Abraham Kahan (from Kyiv). Her mother was a younger sister of the Yiddish poet Mani Leib "Louis" Brahinsky.

She studied at Erasmus Hall High School and Brooklyn College. After taking piano lessons she developed an interest in jazz, and in 1945 married record producer Herb Abramson. In 1947, Abramson joined with Ahmet Ertegun to form Atlantic Records, and Miriam took charge of the fledgling company's finances and production, handling payments to musicians and negotiating distribution deals. She also claimed to have acted as Ruth Brown's manager for a while. As the company flourished with such artists as Ruth Brown, Ray Charles, the Coasters, and the Drifters, she expanded her role as the company's business manager, and negotiated a distribution deal with Decca Records in London in 1955.

She and Herb Abramson divorced in the mid-1950s, after he returned from a tour in the military, and in 1957 she married music publisher Freddy Bienstock. In 1958, Miriam Bienstock was named vice president of Atlantic, in charge of publishing. A profile of her in Billboard that year, headlined "Atlantic's 'Money Man' Is a Woman,” described her as "one of the few women executives in the record industry, a business heretofore noted for its lack of fem talent." She ran the company office and developed a reputation for toughness, later stating: "If the distributors didn't pay their bills, I was very nasty." Ahmet Ertegun said of her: "Miriam was an important person in keeping discipline at Atlantic Records, and keeping everything on the up-and-up... She is unheralded, unrecognized, but if we hadn't had her in those developing years, the company would have folded. She also had very good taste in music.” Although some musicians were critical of the level of royalties they received through her, she said: "We didn't try to cheat anybody, and what we did was normal practice at the time. We paid the royalties, and if they had problems, we'd give them money."

She left Atlantic in the early 1960s, selling her stake in the company to Ertegun and others. She then started theatre work, producing the musical Elvis in London in 1977, using music mostly controlled by her husband Freddy Bienstock's publishing company. She also produced a play, Strider, that ran on Broadway in 1979-1980 and invested in the 2014 musical Beautiful, based on the work of Carole King.

== Death ==
She died at her home in Manhattan in 2015, at the age of 92. Both of her husbands predeceased her; she left a son, Robert Bienstock, and a daughter, Caroline Bienstock.
