= Chimney Sweep Records =

- Founded: 2004
- Founder: Ben Peebles; Josh Peebles
- Genre: Rock
- Country of origin: US
- Location: Blacksburg, Virginia; Alexandria, Virginia
- Official website: Chimney Sweep Records website

Chimney Sweep Records is an independent record label that was founded by brothers Josh and Ben Peebles and is based in Blacksburg, VA and Alexandria, VA respectively. The release of "5-4-Whoa! - a compilation of Southwest VA bands" was their first official release to help launch the label and their most widespread to date.

== Discography ==
CSR01: Against the Norm - "Reign of Stupidity" CD-R (Released 2004)

CSR02: Against the Norm - "Stop the War" CD-R EP (Released 2006)

CSR03: "5-4-Whoa! - a compilation of Southwest VA bands" CD (Released March 4, 2008)

CSR04: imadethismistake - "it's okay" cassette tape (Released May 2008)

CSR05: Eternal Summers / Reading Rainbow - "Summer Reading" split 7-inch (Released August 15, 2009)

CSR06: Mark Zander - "It Really Is" CD (Released April 27, 2010)

CSR07: Eternal Summers "S/T" 10-inch EP (released March 13, 2010)

CSR08: The Young Sinclairs - "Chimeys" 12-inch LP (released June 15, 2010)

CSR09: Rabid Flash Mob - "The Local Scene" CD EP (released July 6, 2013)

CSR10: Rabid Flash Mob - "Like A Riot" CD (released August 6, 2016)
