= Michael Kiessou =

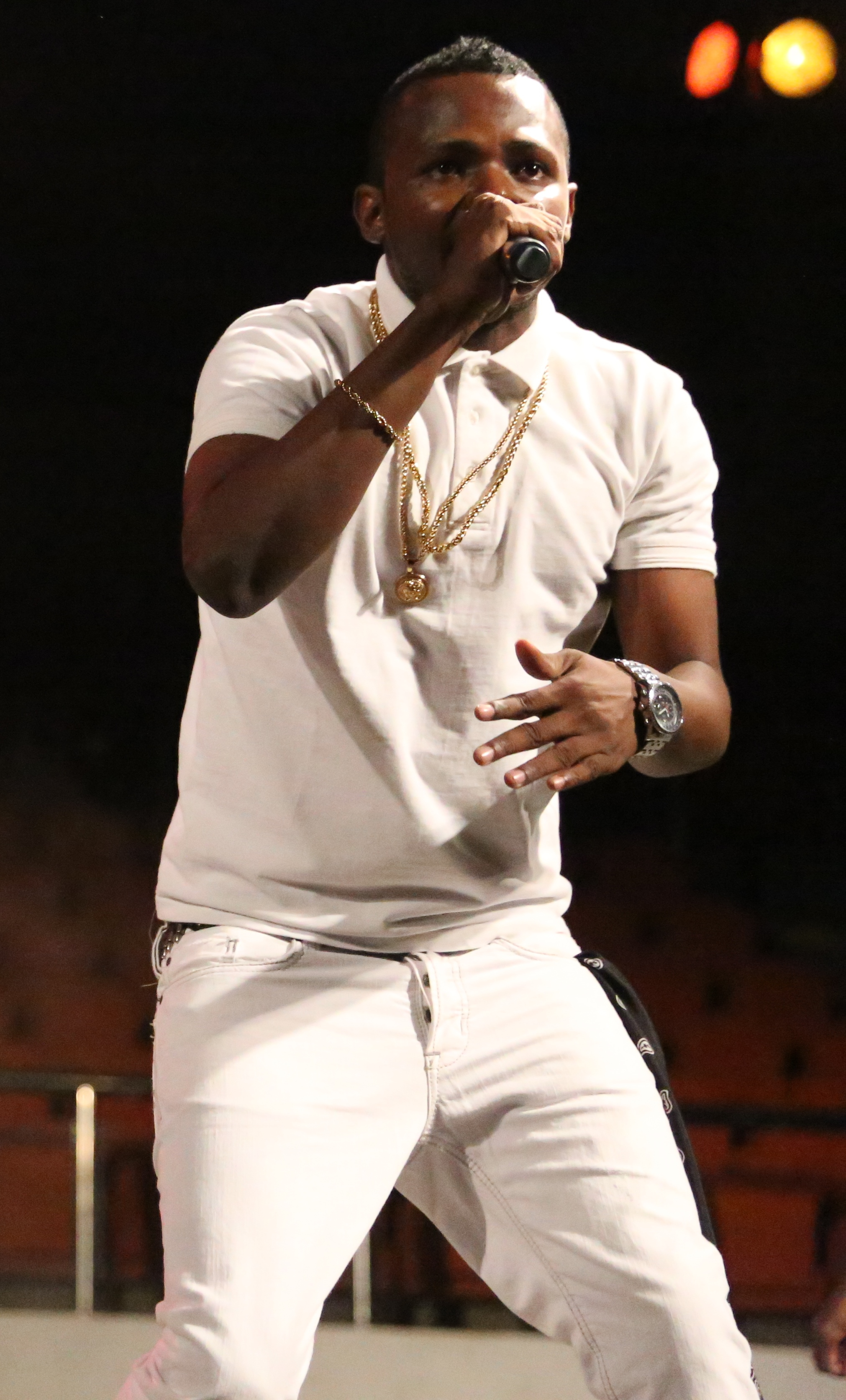
- Michael performing at the Warda Sports Center

Background information
- Also known as: MK Baby, Nomtema
- Born: Anacle Michael Ghounam Kiessou; 11 January 1986 (age 40); Douala, Cameroon
- Origin: Bamiléké, Cameroon Cameroon
- Genres: Afropop, Bend-skin
- Occupations: Singer-songwriter *Composer *Tv host *Voice actor
- Instrument: Vocals
- Years active: 2012–present
- Labels: Hope Music Group; The Orchard (company)
- Website: michaelkiessou.net

Anacle Michael Ghounam Kiessou better known by his stage name Michael Kiessou is a Cameroonian singer and entertainer. He came to wide public attention with his song Bennam. from his debut EP Partage released on 2 April 2014. Twice-nominated for the Canal 2'Or Act 10 (Canal 2 International Awards), he won the Best Video award with Tourner les reins. and Best Male Artist at the 2015 GreenLights Awards.

== Early life ==
Born in Douala, he is a native from the MiFi and Koung-Khi from the West Region (Cameroon). From a young age, he had been lulled by world music and traditional rhythms of his native West. Early influenced by great Cameroonian artists such as Sam Fan Thomas, Douleur, Richard Bona, and many others, throughout his high school studies, he fed his passion and developed his art in school competitions.

== Career ==
=== 2010–2013: Radio and TV host ===
After achieving his bachelor degree in organizations communication at the University of Douala, Michael stepped into radio entertainment. During a training course at the RTM Radio Douala, he met Joyce Fotso, who guided him in his debut as radio and TV host. Two years later, he joined the television channel Canal 2 International in which he will host shows such as Sweet Surfer on Sweet FM radio, Comptoir dafrik and Urban list.

=== Debuts music career ===
Alongside his TV-radio host activity, he decided to step into the music industry by collaborating with Edel Koula, a local RNB singer. Thus, the single Demoiselle marked the debuts of his music career. In March 2013, he met the producer Philjohn who made him sign under his record label Hope Music Group.

=== 2013–2015: Partage (first EP) ===
In 2013 after signing with Hope Music Group, Michael returned from working in studios and focusing on his new music. Produced by Philjohn, Abele was released on 17 July 2013 and became the first single from the EP. Michael through the video concept, honored the festive movement found in the Littoral Region (Cameroon) marking a happy event. To support this move, Michael also paid tribute to the famous Sam Fan Thomas's "Makassi dance". The video was directed by NS Pictures and the world exclusive premiered on the Jambo show of Canal 2 International the 28 July 2013 and YouTube on 3 August 2013.

== Controversy ==
On the eve of Christmas Eve, Michael decided to end his career through a post on his official Facebook page. The news went viral, the media relayed the information, and public opinion was split and asked for clarification on the matter. Some decried a buzz strategy or marketing campaign as the single Wopalilo was about to go out the next week. Through a press release to the media and public, Hope Music group confirmed the information and tried to reassure by promising an eventual return of the artist. Michael's fans and sympathizers sent him a letter four days following the announcement, to remind him that "we don't quit a battle before fighting it". Finally, during the radio program generations, 2.0 of Brice Albin on radio nostalgie Michael announced his return and dropped his Wopalilo video.

== Discography ==
=== Albums ===
- Partage EP (2014–2015)
- Nomtema (Le Prelude) EP (2016)

=== Singles ===
- Demoiselle (2012)
- Abele (2013)
- Bennam (2014)
- Tourner les reins (2014)
- Wopalilo(Sagat Sagat) feat C-Prime (2015)
- Lomdie feat Locko (2015)
- BenTrap (2016)

=== Collaborations ===
- Zeng Zeng – Jemmy Sev (2015)
- KDT – HMG feat Dynastie le tigre, Yvich (2015) (TBD)

== Awards and nominations ==
Canal 2'Or Act 10 ( Canal 2 International Awards )

Year	Nominee / work	Award	Result
2015	Michael Kiessou	Best music revelation	Nominated
2015	Michael Kiessou	Best video (tourner les reins)	Won

Greenlight Awards

Year	Nominee / work	Award	Result
2015	Michael Kiessou	Best Male artist	Won

KR Awards

Year	Nominee / work	Award	Result
2015	Michael Kiessou	Committee special award	Won

MTN Zik Awards

Year	Nominee / work	Award	Result
2016	Michael Kiessou	Most downloaded artist	Won

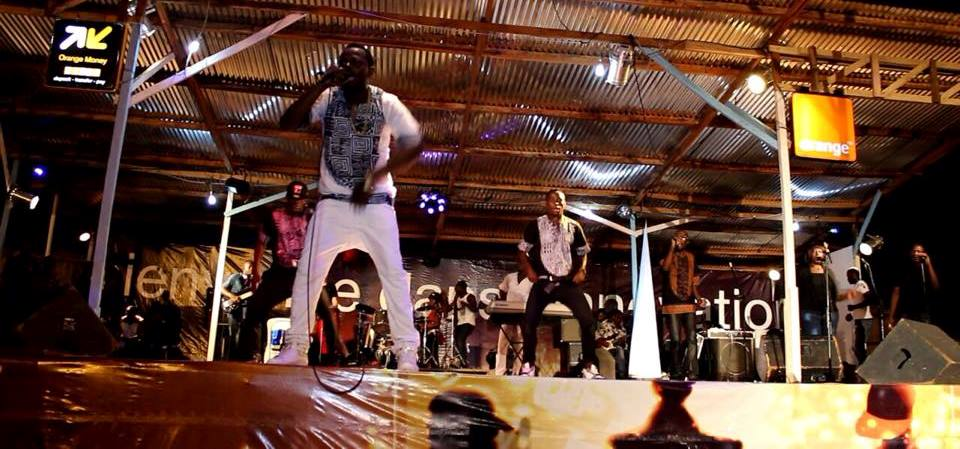
Michael Kiessou au festival Orange Fomaric

== Tours and residencies ==
Wopalilo Live Tour

The Wopalilo live Tour was the first concert tour by Michael. Announced in October 2014 with initial dates mostly in Central Africa, the tour contained 5 legs and 50 shows. It began in Yaoundé, Cameroon on 18 December 2014 and ended in Douala, Cameroon on 30 August 2015. Its title is a reference to his brand new single Wopalilo featuring Cameroonian rapper C-prime, who made multiple guest appearances throughout the tour.

== See also ==
- List of Cameroonian artists
- List of African musicians
