= Future Records (Iceland) =

Independent record label based in Reykjavík, Iceland

- Founded: 2006
- Founder: Hreinn Elíasson
- Genre: Indie, alternative rock, electro
- Country of origin: Iceland
- Location: Reykjavík

Future Records is an independent record label based in Reykjavík, Iceland. It was started in 2006 by Hreinn Elíasson, Sigurmon Hartmann Sigurðsson and Ólafur Halldór Ólafsson – all artists themselves.

== Artists ==
- Weapons
- Cosmic Call
- The Defaults

== See also ==
- Virtual Studios
- Dirty Studios
- List of record labels
