= List of Bangladeshi record labels =

This is a list of Bangladeshi record labels.

- Bongo BD
- CD Choice
- CD Vision
- Ektaar Music
- G-Series
- P Tune Studio
- Soundtek
