= Busy Bee (record label) =

American record label

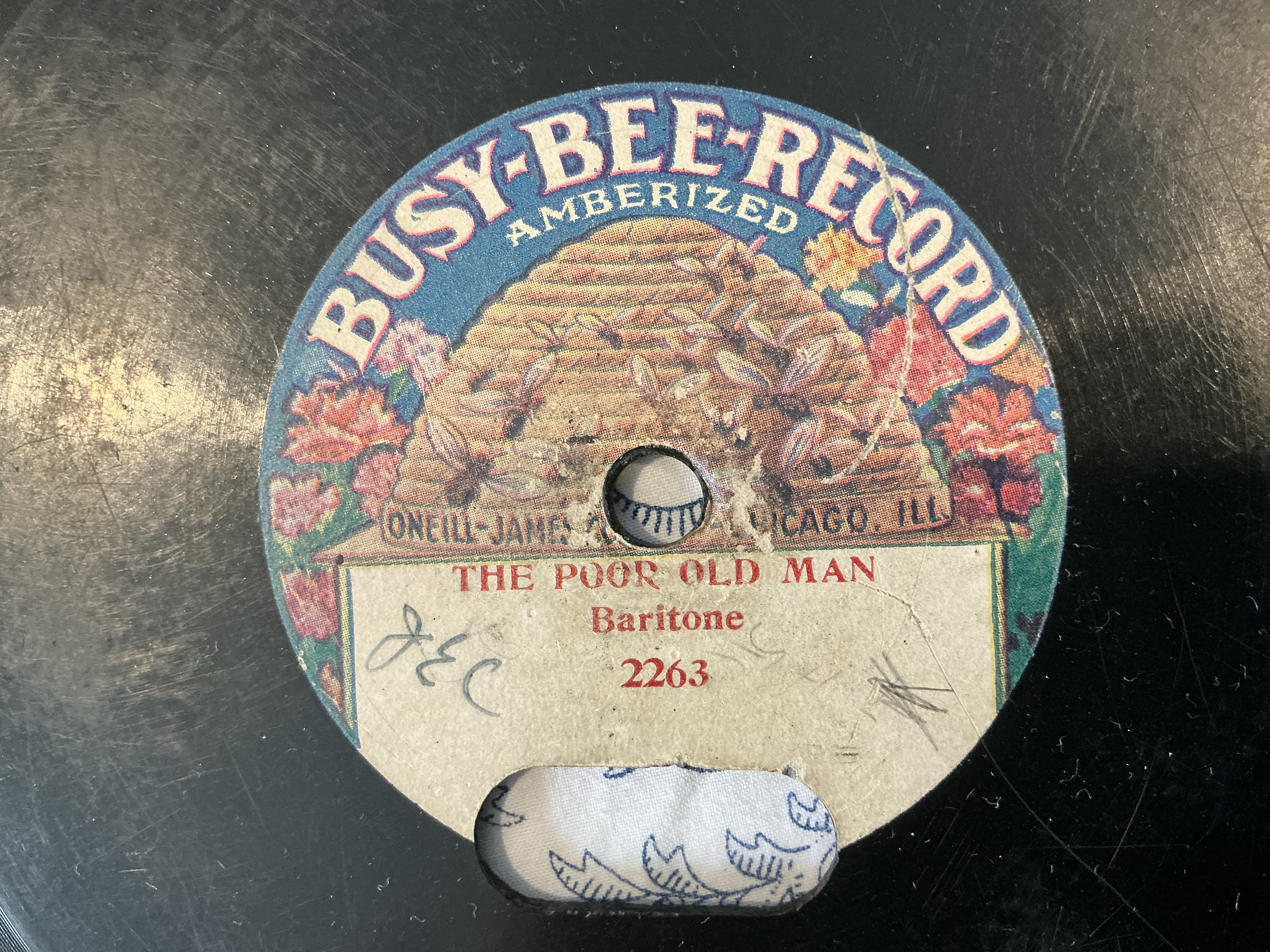
Busy bee record number 2263, featuring “Poor Old Man” by Bob Roberts (uncredited)

Busy-Bee was a Chicago-based record label founded in 1904 that sold both cylinders and discs, often (but not always) with content licensed from other labels. Their cylinders could only be played on special Busy-Bee players, which were most commonly Columbia model Q graphophones outfitted with a special, larger mandrel. This allowed the customer to only buy Busy Bee cylinders, a premium scheme similar to Aretino discs. A 1906 cylinder catalog shows artists including Gilmore's Band, Billy Murray, Arthur Collins, Bob Roberts, and Ada Jones.

== History ==
Busy Bee was founded in April 1904 in Chicago by Arthur James O'Neill (1868–1916), Winifred B. James, and Sherwin Nelson Bisbee (1862–1924). The label is the namesake of Sherwin Nelson Bisbee (1862–1924), a banker, born in Prairie du Chien, Wisconsin, who, at the time, was General Sales Manager for O'Neill-James Company. All of its cylinders had Columbia matrix numbers.

== Bibliography ==
=== References ===
- Bryant, William Roger "Bill" (1950–1995) (2020). Sutton, Allan (ed.). Star Records (Hawthorne & Sheble) Complete Discography (PDF). Littleton, Colorado: Mainspring Press.
  Sutton is the owner of Mainspring Press, LLC. The data was compiled by Bryant.
- "Busy Bee Cylinder Record Catalog" – via Mainspring Press Record Collectors' blog.
- Discogs Label ID No. 437819.
- Hillandale News (The); Petty, John A. (August 1988). "Busy-Bee Labels". Official Journal of The City of London Phonograph and Gramophone Society. No. 163. pp. 68–70 – via Internet Archive.
- Hoffman, Frank; Ferstler, Howard, eds. (2005) [1993]. Encyclopedia of Recorded Sound (2 Vols.) (2nd ed.). Routledge. LCCN 2003-26491; ISBN 978-0-4159-3835-8; OCLC 65174453 (all editions).
1. Vol. 1: "A–L" → "Busy Bee (label). 2005. p. 147 – via Internet Archive (Kahle/Austin Foundation).
2. Vol. 1: "A–L" → "Busy Bee (label)" – via Google Books (limited preview).
3. Vol. 1: "A–L" → "Busy Bee (label)" – via Google Books (limited preview).
- Laboissonnière, Guy; Settlemier, Tyrone. "Busy Bee Cylinders Numerical Listing" (Last update April 18, 2013). The Online Discographical Project.
- Phonograph Monthly Review; Oman, George Wilson (1895–1947) (May 1929). "Adventures in Collecting". 3 (8): 264, 266–268 – via Internet Archive (National Recording Preservation Board). LCCN unk84135656; OCLC 11380159 (all editions), OCLC 1762297 (all editions) & 499264168.
  Oman, the author, was an Edinburgh-born Chicago-based telegraph operator and organizer of the Phonograph Art Society of Chicago.
- Phonograph Monthly Review; Prescott, John Osgood (1871–1946), Research Department, Columbia Phonograph Co. (June 1929). "Correspondence" → "At Last! The Truth About the 'Busy Bee'". 3 (9): 305 – via Internet Archive (National Recording Preservation Board).
  Note: Prescott was responding to a contributor of a May 1929 article, "Adventures in Collecting," by Oman. Prescott, a recording pioneer on various levels, had been affiliated with International Zonophone Company, which incorporated in Jersey City March, 7, 1901. His brother, Frederick Marion Prescott (1869–1923) became Managing Director and J.O., himself, was one of the shareholders.
- UCSB (16 November 2005). "Busy-Bee Cylinders" – via Cylinder Audio Archive, University of California Santa Barbara.
