= Ammor Records =

American record label

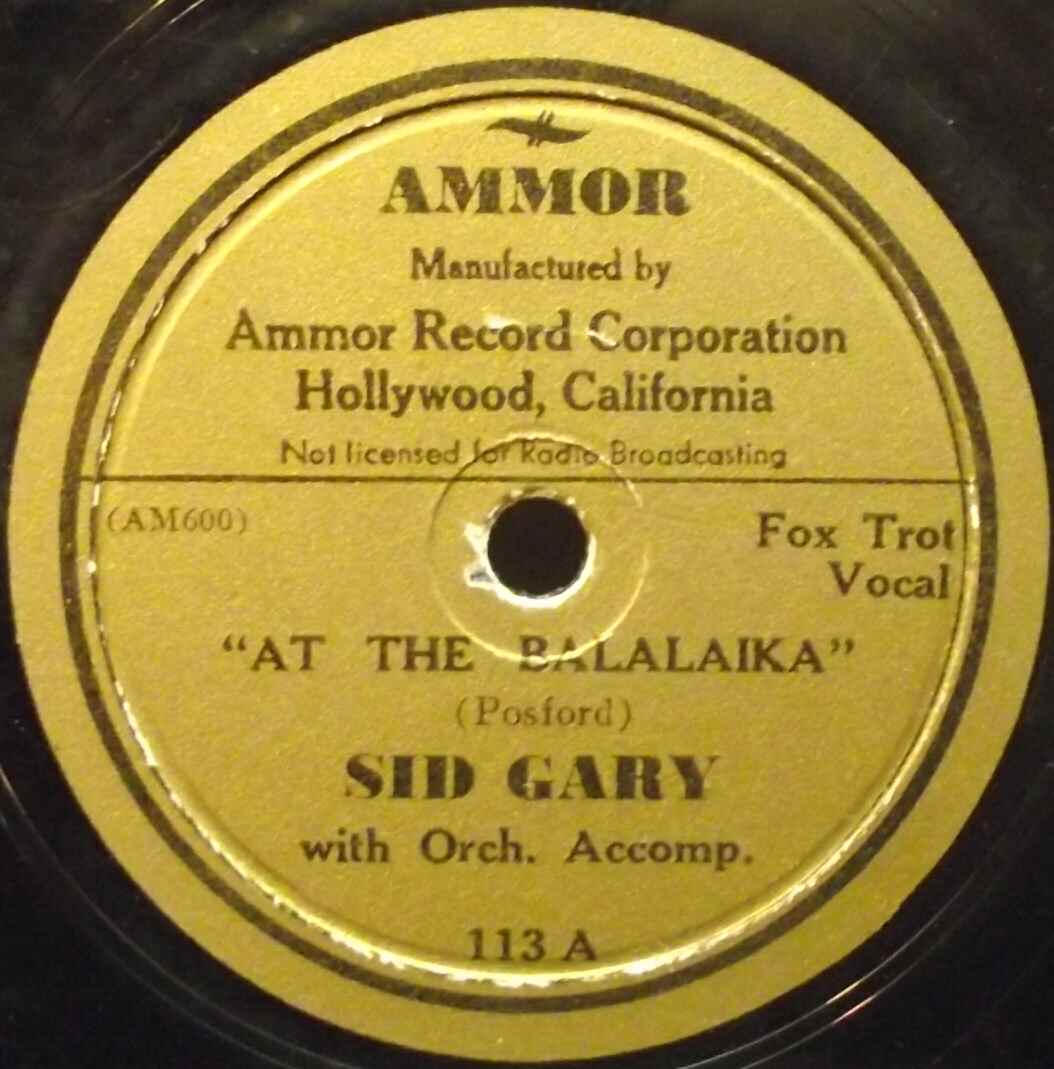
Ammor 113 side A

Ammor Records was a short-lived American record label. It issued the first commercial recordings of Nat King Cole.

== History ==
The Ammor Record Corporation issued their first records in 1940. Ammor focused on performers who were based on the West Coast. Recording and manufacturing were handled by C. P. Macgregor. Ammor only issued records for a few months, issuing around 20 discs. When Ammor ceased operations, some of the recordings were subsequently released on Eli Oberstein's Varsity Records, and when Varsity quit, material originating from Ammor was in turn released on Savoy Records.

== Repertoire ==
In 1940 Nat King Cole signed a contract with Ammor. He recorded four sides in February 1940. Issued shortly thereafter, these were the first Nat King Cole records offered to the general public. Other artist who appear on Ammor are the Larry Breese orchestra, the Ceele Burke orchestra, the Seger Ellis orchestra, Sid Gary, and the Pied Pipers. (Note: unlikely to be the same group as The Pied Pipers)
