= Bell Records (1920) =

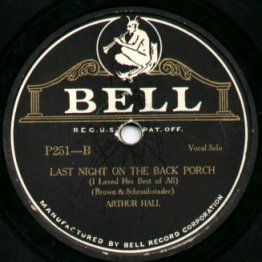
- Founded: 1920
- Country of origin: United States

The United States-based Bell Records record label started issuing records in about 1920. The label's parent company was the Standard Music Roll Company of Orange, New Jersey, which was also the parent of Arto Records. After Standard Music Roll got out of the disc record business in 1923, the label was continued by the Bell Record Corporation of Newark, New Jersey, using masters recorded by Emerson Records. In 1927, the source of Bell masters shifted to Gennett Records. The label went out of business in 1928.

Bell artists included the Hotel McAlpin Orchestra, the Lanin Melody Orchestra, Arthur Hall, Billy Jones, Ernest Hare, the Bell Serenaders, Frank Daly's Bell Record Orchestra, Nathan Glantz, the Hollywood Ramblers, the Roseland Dance Orchestra, Hazel Meyers, the Club Folly Orchestra, and the Golden State Orchestra.

== See also ==
- List of record labels
- Bell Records
