= Blaze Records =

Blaze Records was a record label founded by former Atlantic Records president Herb Abramson. The label's biggest hit was a version of "Tennessee Waltz" by Bobby Comstock in 1959. The label lasted only a couple of years after which Abramson founded Festival Records.
