= Bend-skin =

Genre of urban Cameroonian popular music

Bend-skin (bend skin) is a kind of urban Cameroonian popular music. Kouchouam Mbada is the best known group associated with the genre. Several other artists have over the years contributed to the growth and popularity of bend skin. It is related to mangambeu, and is played using only drums and maracas (often made from soda cans), with a vocalist who both sings and raps. It is often sung in Medumba which is the language of the Bangangte people and in many other Bamileke dialects.

Bend-skin became popular in 1993 in the New-Bell Banganté's neighbourhood, amid a time of economic depression. Although gaining grounds in most urban settings in Cameroon, Bend-skin is closely associated with the Western Province of Cameroon (the Bamileke people), who have been responsible for developing and promoting this genre of music. The genre regained popular acclamation in the 21st century with artists like Marole Tchamba, Keng Godefroy, Michael Kiessou, Featurist and many others.
