= Phonograph Monthly Review =

American monthly phonograph record magazine

Music Lovers' Phonograph Monthly Review
- Editor: Axel B. Johnson
- Frequency: Monthly
- Publisher: The Phonograph Publishing Co., Inc.
- Founder: Axel B. Johnson
- First issue: October 1, 1926 (Vol. 1, no. 1)
- Country: United States
- Based in: Jamaica Plain, Boston
- Language: English
- OCLC: 11380159

Music Lovers' Phonograph Monthly Review (PMR) was an American magazine for record enthusiasts founded in Jamaica Plain, Boston, by Axel B. Johnson. The first issue was dated October 1926 (Vol., no. 1) (Note: The first issue of Music Lovers' Phonograph Monthly Review, dated October 1926 (Vol. 1, no. 1), was issued September 15, 1926. (Talking Machine World; September 15, 1926. p. 75)) – three years, six months after the first issue of Gramophone, a similar magazine founded in London by Compton Mackenzie. As put by George Wilson Oman (1895–1947) – an Edinburgh-born Chicago-based telegraph operator and organizer of the Phonograph Art Society of Chicago – "This magazine is to the United States what the Gramophone is to Great Britain and bids fair in its splendidly edited pages to rival the Gramophone." The magazine ran for 66 issues – six and one-half years – ending March 1932 (Vol. 6, no. 6), under financial duress during the Great Depression. Although, the suspension of the April and May 1932 issues has been attributed to, according to Gramophone magazine, "a misfortune of which we have only just heard from an American reader." "He says that the Editor, Mr. Axel Johnson, was kidnapped late in March, 'robbed, beaten unconscious and thrown from a speeding automobile.'" PMR – through the succession of Music Lovers' Guide (1932–1935) and The American Music Lover (1935–1944) – is considered the forerunner to the American Record Guide.

== History ==
The magazine launch occurred (i) one year, three months after Columbia (May 1925) and (ii) ten months after Victor (November 2, 1925; "Victor Day") debuted their new systems – orthophonic (electrical) recording technology – electronically-amplified sound developed by Bell Labs-Western Electric in an effort to replace the limited properties of the acoustic recording horn. The mid-1920s was also the beginning of the Golden Age of Radio and prior to the introduction of the new technology, consumer demand for old-style phonographs waned in favor of radios.

Reviews of recordings were first published in 1906 in Berlin by Phonographische Zeitschrift (de); but, The Gramophone, in England, and the Phonograph Monthly Review, in North America, were the first non-record label periodicals that focused primarily on reviewing musical recordings.

In 1932, Axel B. Johnson and R.D. Darrell purchased the Music Lovers' Guide. The magazine ran monthly for 31 issues, from September 1932 (Vol. 1, no. 1) through March 1935 (Vol. 3, no. 7). (Note: As of November 2022, only one digitized issue of Music Lovers' Guide (March 1934; Vol. 2, no. 7) was fully accessible online. (Music Lovers' Guide. Vol. 2, no. 7. March 1934 – via Internet Archive → uploaded February 27, 2022, by Shellackophile).)

== Phonograph Monthly Review (digitized online) ==
- Johnson, Axel B. (ed.). Music Lovers' Phonograph Monthly Review. Jamaica Plain, Boston: The Phonograph Publishing Co., Inc.. LCCN unk84135656; OCLC 11380159 (all editions), OCLC 1762297 (all editions) & 499264168.
Axel B. Johnson, Managing Editor ↓
1. Vol. 1, no. 1. October 1926 – via Google Books.
2. Vol. 1, no. 2. November 1926 – via Google Books.
3. Vol. 1, no. 3. December 1926 – via Google Books.
4. Vol. 1, no. 4. January 1927 – via Google Books.
5. Vol. 1, no. 5. February 1927 – via Google Books.
6. Vol. 1, no. 6. March 1927 – via Google Books.
7. Vol. 1, no. 7. April 1927 – via Google Books.
8. Vol. 1, no. 8. May 1927 – via Google Books.
9. Vol. 1, no. 9. June 1927 – via Google Books.
10. Vol. 1, no. 10. July 1927 – via Google Books.
11. Vol. 1, no. 11. August 1927 – via Google Books.
12. Vol. 1, no. 12. September 1927 – via Google Books.
13. Vol. 2, no. 1. October 1927 – via Internet Archive.
14. Vol. 2, no. 2. November 1927 – via Internet Archive.
15. Vol. 2, no. 3. December 1927 – via Internet Archive.
16. Vol. 2, no. 4. January 1928 – via Internet Archive.
17. Vol. 2, no. 5. February 1928 – via Internet Archive.
18. Vol. 2, no. 6. March 1928 – via Internet Archive.
19. Vol. 2, no. 7. April 1928 – via Internet Archive.
20. Vol. 2, no. 8. May 1928 – via Internet Archive.
21. Vol. 2, no. 9. June 1928 – via Internet Archive.
22. Vol. 2, no. 10. July 1928 – via Internet Archive.
23. Vol. 2, no. 11. August 1928 – via Internet Archive.
24. Vol. 2, no. 12. September 1928 – via Internet Archive.
25. Vol. 3, no. 1. October 1928 – via Internet Archive.
26. Vol. 3, no. 2. November 1928 – via Internet Archive.
27. Vol. 3, no. 3. December 1928 – via Internet Archive.
28. Vol. 3, no. 4. January 1929 – via Internet Archive.
29. Vol. 3, no. 5. February 1929 – via Internet Archive.
30. Vol. 3, no. 6. March 1929 – via Internet Archive.
31. Vol. 3, no. 7. April 1929 – via Internet Archive.
32. Vol. 3, no. 8. May 1929 – via Internet Archive.
33. Vol. 3, no. 9. June 1929 – via Internet Archive.
34. Vol. 3, no. 10. July 1929 – via Internet Archive.
35. Vol. 3, no. 11. August 1929 – via Internet Archive.
36. Vol. 3, no. 12. September 1929 – via Internet Archive.
37. Vol. 4, no. 1. October 1929 – via Internet Archive.
38. Vol. 4, no. 2. November 1929 – via Internet Archive.
39. Vol. 4, no. 3. December 1929 – via Internet Archive.
40. Vol. 4, no. 4. January 1930 – via Internet Archive.
41. Vol. 4, no. 5. February 1930 – via Internet Archive.
42. Vol. 4, no. 6. March 1930 – via Internet Archive.
43. Vol. 4, no. 7. April 1930 – via Internet Archive.
Axel B. Johnson, Associate Editor
Robert Donaldson Darrell, Managing Editor ↓
44. Vol. 4, no. 8. May 1930 – via Internet Archive.
45. Vol. 4, no. 9. June 1930 – via Internet Archive.
46. Vol. 4, no. 10. July 1930 – via Internet Archive.
47. Vol. 4, no. 11. August 1930 – via Internet Archive.
48. Vol. 4, no. 12. September 1930 – via Internet Archive.
Phonograph Monthly Review (name change) ↓

New art deco cover, designed by Emma Cartwright Bourne (1906–1986), featuring abstract images of discs and an acoustic tonearm with soundbox rather than an electrical pickup.

49. Vol. 5, no. 1. October 1930 – via Internet Archive.
50. Vol. 5, no. 2. November 1930 – via Internet Archive.
51. Vol. 5, no. 3. December 1930 – via Internet Archive.
52. Vol. 5, no. 4. January 1931 – via Internet Archive.
53. Vol. 5, no. 5. February 1931 – via Internet Archive.
54. Vol. 5, no. 6. March 1931 – via Internet Archive.
Axel B. Johnson, Associate Editor
Robert Donaldson Darrell, Editor ↓
55. Vol. 5, no. 7. April 1931 – via Internet Archive.
56. Vol. 5, no. 8. May 1931 – via Internet Archive.
57. Vol. 5, no. 9. June 1931 – via Internet Archive.
58. Vol. 5, no. 10. July 1931 – via Internet Archive.
Robert Donaldson Darrell, Editor
Axel B. Johnson, Business Manager ↓
59. Vol. 5, no. 11. August 1931 – via Internet Archive.
60. Vol. 5, no. 12. September 1931 – via Internet Archive.
61. Vol. 6, no. 1. October 1931 – via Internet Archive.
Axel B. Johnson, Managing Editor ↓
62. Vol. 6, no. 2. November 1931 – via Internet Archive.
63. Vol. 6, no. 3. December 1931 – via Internet Archive.
64. Vol. 6, no. 4. January 1932 – via Internet Archive.
65. Vol. 6, no. 5. February 1932 – via Internet Archive.
Axel B. Johnson, Managing Editor
Adolph A. Biewend, Associate Editor ↓
66. Vol. 6, no. 6. March 1932 – via Internet Archive.
- Other access. October 27, 2016 – via Association for Recorded Sound Collections.
- Other access – via Lantern, Wisconsin Center for Film and Theater Research.
- Other access – via Media History Digital Library.

––––––––––––––––––––

The Google Books versions were digitized from originals held at the Stanford University Libraries
The Internet Archive versions were uploaded in August 2016 by the National Recording Preservation Board

== Editors and contributors ==
- Axel B. Johnson (born around 1874) – founder, publisher, and Managing Editor of PMR – had been for a brief time secretary of the Boston Gramophone Society. He often signed his articles, "A.B.J." Robert Donaldson Darrell, Johnson's assistant and staff writer, took over as Managing Editor in 1930 after Johnson stepped down after his wife, Johanne (aka Johanna) Johnson (1877–1929), died in Jamaica Plain November 13, 1929. Their residence, at the time, was 47 Hampstead, Jamaica Plain. Johnson had previously, from about 1922 to about 1926, been a barber in the Jamaica Plain area of Boston. Before that, in 1921, he lived in Pascoag, Rhode Island.
- Richard Gilmore Appel (1889–1975), Literary Editor and contributor, was head of the Music Division at the Boston Public Library.
- Adolf Albert Biewend (1899–1953), born in Jamaica Plain, was Associate Editor and contributor since 1926. He was a 1925 graduate of Northeastern University. He became an attorney. His father, Rev. Adolf Heinrich Angelo Biewent (1814–1919), founded in 1871 the German Lutheran Church in Roxbury, and was its pastor until 1914. His mother, Elizabeth H. Biewend (1869–1941), had been an instructor at Wellesley College.
- Emma Cartwright Bourne (maiden; 1906–1986), born in Norfolk, Connecticut, a painter and etcher, designed a new cover for PMR, beginning with Vol. 5, no. 1 (October 1930), issued days after marrying – on September 30, 1930, in Arlington, Massachusetts – PMR's managing editor, Robert Donaldson Darrell. They divorced in 1936. Bourne was a 1927 graduate of Vassar College, the alma mater of her mother, Edith Louise Hunter (maiden; 1877–1950) (class of 1900). Emma had studied art with Richard Andrew (1869–1956) of the Massachusetts School of Art. Her cover design, in an art deco style, features abstract images of phonographic discs with an acoustic tonearm and soundbox, rather than an electrical pickup. Bourne also, in April 1932 drew a sketch of Isaac Goldberg for Disques magazine.
- Henry Cantwell Cox (1890–1954) – who, beginning in March 1925, became President of the newly organized Columbia Phonograph Company, Inc.
- Robert Donaldson Darrell (1903–1988) – a former student at Harvard (1922) and composition student at the New England Conservatory (1923–1926) – became editor of the PMR. He took interest in jazz after hearing Ellington in 1927 and wrote positive reviews of his and other artists' work. In 1939, Darrell received a Guggenheim Fellowship. Darrell, who also wrote for Disques, by 1927, in PMR, was writing jazz reviews. According to James Lincoln Collier, for the "Jazz" entry in the 1994 edition of The New Grove Dictionary of Jazz, "Darrell was the first writer on jazz to make judgements in print that generally hold up today." And, "he was the first writer to single out Ellington's "Black and Tan Fantasy" for extended comment."
- Vories Fischer (né Franklin Vories Fisher; 1901–1969).
- Theodore Feland Gannon (1901–1979), business manager of the Cincinnati Symphony Orchestra.
- George Clarence "Clare" Jell (1881–1955), Ontario-born and naturalized U.S. citizen, known for his connection to the Columbia Masterworks Library.
- Alfred Henry Meyer (1888–1944), music critic for the Boston Transcript for about 10 years. He was a faculty member of Boston University since 1929 and, in 1941 until his death, served as Dean of its School of Music. He was an authority on American modern music. He was a graduate of Oberlin College and studied at had studied also at Harvard and the New England Conservatory of Music.
- George Wilson Oman (1895–1947) – an Edinburgh-born Chicago-based telegraph operator and organizer of the Phonograph Art Society of Chicago.
- Rev. Herbert Boyce Satcher (1890–1966), Episcopal clergyman and, at the time, Vicar of St. Aidan's Chapel in Cheltenham, Pennsylvania, founded, in 1928, the Cheltenham Phonograph Society, the first known clergyman in America to found a record society. He also contributed to PMR. He was regarded an authority of hymnology. He compiled Indices to Volumes I, II & III of the Phonograph Monthly Review, which was published in 1930 by The Phonograph Publishing Company.
- William Henry Seltsam (1897–1968), who, early in 1932 in Bridgeport, Connecticut, founded the International Record Collectors' Club, and, among other things, persuaded American and foreign record labels to issue special editions of historically important recordings. He wrote about early opera recordings. He went on to become curator and bibliographer of the Metropolitan Opera.
- Edward Earl Shumaker (1882–1949), President of RCA Victor from 1925 to 1931, wrote an article titled "Television" for the December 1930 issue.
- Moses Smith (né Moses Smithkins; 1901–1964), a 1921 graduate of Harvard College, was Associate Editor and contributor. He flourished in Boston as a music critic, first, in 1924, at the Boston American, then, beginning around 1934, at the Boston Transcript. After the demise of the Transcript, he became an executive at Columbia Masterworks in New York.
- Ulysses "Jim" Walsh (1903–1990).
- Walter Leslie Welch (1901–1995), who, in 1959 with Oliver Read, co-wrote From Tin Foil to Stereo, discusses cylinders in a letter in the October 1930 issue.

== Bibliography ==
=== References ===
Books, journals, magazines, papers, independent blogs
- American Mercury (The) (March 1930), Indices to Volume I, II & III of the Phonograph Monthly Review, "Music" → "Books" (review), vol. 20, Sunway Media, p. 250 – via Internet Archive (Kahle/Austin Foundation)
- Anon. (February 1, 1945). "Dean Alfred H. Meyer of Boston University Is Dead" (PDF). The Diapason. Vol. 36, no. 3. American Guild of Organists and Canadian College of Organists. p. 5.
- Baker's Biographical Dictionary of Musicians.
1. "Appel, Richard Gilmore" (revised & enlarged 4th ed.). G. Schirmer. 1940. pp. 26–27. LCCN 40029670 – via Internet Archive (Friends of the San Francisco Public Library).
2. "Darrell, Robert Donaldson" (completely revised by Nicholas Slonimsky 5th ed.). G. Schirmer. 1958. p. 350. LCCN 58004953 – via Internet Archive (ARChive of Contemporary Music).
3. "Darrell, Robert Donaldson" (revised by Nicholas Slonimsky 7th ed.). Oxford University Press. 1984. p. 543. ISBN 0-0287-0270-0. LCCN 84005595 – via Internet Archive (Arcadia Fund).
- Boston Residents: List of Residents, City of Boston. City of Boston, Election Department, Printing Department (publisher).
1. "Ward 22, Precinct 11." "Hyde Park Avenue" → "Johnson, Axel B." → "Barber". April 1, 1922. p. 5 – via Internet Archive (Boston Public Library).
- Disques; Darrell, Robert Donaldson (April 1932), Jacob and Isaac (and Daniel), vol. 3, pp. 64–68 – via Internet Archive
- Etude (The); Briggs, Marion L. (October 1956), The 'Bach' of High Fidelity – From an Interview With Robert D. Darrell, Secured by Marion L. Briggs, vol. 74, pp. 13–14 – via Internet Archive
- Gennari, John Remo (Autumn 1991). "Jazz Criticism: Its Development and Ideologies". Black American Literature Forum (Literature of Jazz Issue). 25 (3): 449–523. doi:10.2307/3041811. ISSN 0148-6179. JSTOR 3041811. OCLC 5269585928, 7493631165..
- Good, Katie Day (June 2020). "Digital History Reviews" → "The Media History Digital Library". The Journal of American History. 107 (1): 299–301. doi:10.1093/jahist/jaaa175. ISSN 1945-2314, 0021-8723 OCLC 8654894523, 8622730692.; EBSCOhost 144383495; ProQuest 2734066677.
- Gracyk, Timothy A.; with Frank W. Hoffman (2000). Popular American Recording Pioneers: 1895–1925. Series: Haworth Popular Culture. Routledge. p. 5. LCCN 99-49825; ISBN 1-5602-4993-5, 978-1-5602-4993-1; OCLC 42476113 (all editions).
1. Link 1 – via Z-Library.
2. Link 2 – via Google Books (limited preview).
- Gracyk, Timothy A. (Autumn 1998). "Phonograph Monthly Review: A Forgotten Publication?". Victrola and 78 Journal. No. 11. pp. 26–31 – via Internet Archive.
- Gracyk, Timothy A. (Autumn 1998). "The Life and Writing Career of Ulysses 'Jim' Walsh". Victrola and 78 Journal. No. 13. pp. 44–59 – via Internet Archive.
- Gramophone (The). 1 (1). April 1923 – via Internet Archive.
- Gramophone (The) (April 1926), Trade Winds and Idle Zephyrs" → "Boston G.S., vol. 3, p. 520 – via Internet Archive
- Gramophone (The) (May 1927), List of Gramophone Societies" → "U.S.A., vol. 4, p. 517 – via Google Books
- Gramophone (The) (June 1932), Analytical Notes and First Reviews" → "The Phonograph (PDF), p. 22 – via World Radio History, maintained by David Frackelton Gleason (born 1946), Cleveland
- Hall, David (March 1969). "Record-Industry Notes". Notes (Sic transit gloria ... passing of William H. Seltsam). Second Series. 25 (3): 465–467. doi:10.2307/895340. ISSN 0027-4380. JSTOR 895340. OCLC 5548121510..
  The author, David Hall, was the founding Editor of the ARSC Journal, and, from 1980 to 1982, President of the ARSC. He was the founding curator of recorded sound at the New York Public Library for the Performing Arts, which grew into a division known as the Rodgers and Hammerstein Sound Archives. He also had been a record critic for Stereo Review.
- Hoffman, Frank; Ferstler, Howard, eds. (2005) [1993]. Encyclopedia of Recorded Sound (2 Vols.) (2nd ed.). Routledge. ISBN 978-0-4159-3835-8. LCCN 2003026491.; OCLC 65174453 (all editions).
  See Encyclopedia of Recorded Sound.
1. Vol. 1: "A–L". December 5, 2023 – via Internet Archive (Kahle/Austin Foundation).
2. Vol. 2: "M–Z" & "Index". December 5, 2023 – via Internet Archive (Kahle/Austin Foundation).
- Hughes, Rupert Raleigh (ed.). Music Lovers' Encyclopedia. Completely revised and newly edited by Deems Taylor and Russell Kerr (né Russell Master Knerr; 1898–1975).
1. 1939 ed (877 pages; 8°). Garden City Publishing Co., Inc. December 5, 2023. LCCN 39027032.
2. 1939 ed (877 pages; 8°). Doubleday, Doran and Company, Inc. December 5, 2023 – via Internet Archive.
3. 1947 ed (1947 re-print ed.). Garden City Publishing Co., Inc. December 5, 2023. LCCN 47003087 – via Internet Archive (Alibris).
4. 1950 ed. Garden City Books. December 5, 2023 – via Internet Archive (Kahle/Austin Foundation).
5. 1954 ed. Garden City Books. December 5, 2023. LCCN 55000368 – via Internet Archive (Universal Digital Library).
6. 1954 ed. Doubleday & Company (publisher). Printed in Garden City, New York, by The Country Life Press. December 5, 2023. ISBN 9780385001243 – via Internet Archive (Kahle/Austin Foundation).
- Magoun, Alexander Boyden (2000). Shaping the Sound of Music: The Evolution of the Phonograph Record, 1877–1950 (PhD dissertation; University of Maryland). p. 286 – via Internet Archive. OCLC 156373582 (all editions).
- Milligan, Stuart (December 1980). "Music and Other Performing Arts Serials Available in Microform and Reprint Editions". Notes. 37 (2). Music Library Association: 239–307. JSTOR 939494.
- New Grove Dictionary of Jazz (The). St. Martin's Press. 1994 – via Internet Archive (ARChive of Contemporary Music).
1. Collier, James Lincoln (December 5, 1994). "Jazz." → § III. "The Spread of Jazz." → 6. "Jazz in the Entertainment Industry and the Press". pp. 587–588.
- Lindahl, Charles (December 1981). "Music Periodicals in U. S. Research Libraries in 1931: A Retrospective Survey Part III: The United States". Notes. 38 (2). Music Library Association: 320–326. doi:10.2307/939876. ISSN 0027-4380. JSTOR 939876. OCLC 5556160852.
  For 18 years, Lindahl was an assistant professor and reference librarian at the Eastman School of Music.
- Read, Oliver Hebert; Welch, Walter Leslie (1976) [1959]. From Tin Foil to Stereo: Evolution of the Phonograph. Howard W. Sams & Co., Inc. & The Bobbs-Merrill Co., Inc.
1. 1st ed. (1959) – via HathiTrust. LCCN 59-15832; OCLC 1312922 (all editions).
2. 1st printing, 2nd ed. (1976). December 5, 1976 – via Internet Archive. LCCN 75-5412; ISBN 0-6722-1205-6, 0-6722-1206-4
- Satcher, Rev. Herbert Boyce (1930). Indices to Volumes I, II & III of the Phonograph Monthly Review. Boston: The Phonograph Publishing Company (publisher).
- Shellackophile (The) – 78 RPM oriented blog, since 2010, of Walter Bryan Bishop, a musician – pianist, harpsichordist – record collector, and music educator from the Atlanta area. Re: Music Lovers' Guide, March 1932 – via Blogspot. (The Shellackophile)
- Vassar College (1910). General Catalogue of the Officers and Graduates of Vassar College (re: "Edith Louise Hunter"). Vol. 4. Poughkeepsie: The A.V. Haight Company. p. 183 – via Internet Archive. (alternate link. General catalogue of the officers and alumnae of Vassar College1920. The A.V. Haight Company. December 5, 1880 – via HathiTrust.) LCCN 11-27782.
- Welburn, Ron [Ronald Garfield] (Autumn 1987). "Jazz Magazines of the 1930s: An Overview of Their Provocative Journalism". Journal of the Society for American Music. 5 (3): 255–270. doi:10.2307/3051735. ISSN 0734-4392. JSTOR 3051735. OCLC 5547965040, 7376919917.
- Welburn, Ronald Garfield (1985). Morgenstern, Dan; Nanry, Charles; Cayer, David A (eds.). "The Early Record Review: Jazz Criticism's First Born Child" – "Music Lovers' Guide and American Music Lover". Annual Review of Jazz Studies. 3. Transaction Books: 125–126 – via Internet Archive (Kahle/Austin Foundation).
- Who Was Who in American Art, 1564–1975: 400 Years of Artists in America (A–F) (December 5, 1998). Falk, Peter Hastings; Lewis, Audrey; Kuchen, Georgia; Roessler, Veronika (eds.). Entry → "Bourne, Emma Cartwright" (3 vols.). Vol. 1. Sound View Press. p. 397. ISBN 9780932087553 – via Internet Archive (Kahle/Austin Foundation). LCCN 2001-271878; ISBN 0-9320-8755-8; OCLC 42517882 (all editions).
- Yale University Library (1946). Herbert Boyce Satcher Collection (microfilm). OCLC 80809825.
News Media
- Brooklyn Daily Eagle (June 14, 1929). "Melba Cursed Director; Phonograph Recorded It". Vol. 89, no. 164. p. 6 – via newspapers.com.
- Brooklyn Daily Eagle (July 10, 1929). "The Man Hears All Phonograph Records Made". Vol. 89, no. 189. p. 2 (col. 2, middle) – via newspapers.com.
- Lexington Leader (The) (May 12, 1937). "Melodies of Old Gathered by Hobbyists – Magazines Unite Hobbyists". Vol. 49, no. 132. p. 19 (col. 5, bottom) – via Newspapers.com.
- New York Times (The) (May 7, 1988). "R. D. Darrell, 84, Dies; Recorded-Music Critic".
1. "R. D. Darrell, 84, Dies; Recorded Music Critic". The New York Times. May 6, 1988. p. A31.
2. "R. D. Darrell, 84, Dies; Recorded-Music Critic". The New York Times. May 7, 1988. p. 31.
- Philadelphia Inquirer (May 14, 1966). "Rev. Satcher Dies, Hymnology Expert". Vol. 274, no. 134 (Final City ed.). p. 10 – via Newspapers.com.
PMR references
- PMR; Johnson, Axel B. (October 1926). "Topics of General Interest". 1 (1): 29–30 – via Google Books.
- PMR (November 1926). "Phonograph Society Reports". 1 (2): 33–35 – via Google Books.
- PMR (March 1927). "Phonograph Society Reports" → "Mr. Vories Fisher" (article includes portrait drawing). 1 (6): 273 – via Google Books.
- PMR; Oman, George W. (June 1927). "A Historical Survey". 1 (9): 370–373 – via Google Books.
- PMR; Gannon, Theodore Feland (November 1927). "Meanderings". 2 (2): 49–52 – via Internet Archive.
- PMR; Prescott, John Osgood (June 1929). Correspondence" → "At Last! The Truth About the 'Busy Bee'. 3 (9): 305 – via Internet Archive.
  Note: Prescott, was responding to contributor, George Wilson Oman (1895–1947). Prescott, a recording pioneer on various levels, had been affiliated with International Zonophone Company, which incorporated in Jersey City March 7, 1901. His brother, Frederick Marion Prescott became managing director and J.O., himself, was one of the shareholders.
- PMR; Darrell, Robert Donaldson (October 1930). "The Theremin". 5 (1): 3–5 – via Internet Archive.
