= BLIGHT. Records =

- Founded: 2012
- Founder: Benjamin Schurr
- Genre: experimental pop music, electronic music
- Country of origin: United States
- Location: Washington, DC
- Official website: http://www.blightrecords.org

BLIGHT. Records is an independent record label based in Washington, DC.

== Background ==
Founded in 2012 by Benjamin Schurr, BLIGHT. Records has released works by artists with influences ranging from experimental pop to electronic and industrial.

The label has garnered attention for its "embrace of experimentalism" and a tendency to "shift away from genre-specific releases and toward a melting pot of musical and visual ideas." Washington City Paper describes the label as "a creative collective where like-minded musicians move fluidly between each other’s projects," even as such projects retain their own distinct identities.

Electronic elements are explored throughout a number of the label's releases. Examinations of identity, politics, gender and sexuality can also be found frequently across albums.

== Format ==
BLIGHT. Records primarily utilizes the cassette tape format for its releases.

== Artists ==
The following is a list of artists with works released on BLIGHT. Records:

- Kamyar Arsani
- Seán Barna (ft. Paperhaus)
- Blacklodge + em.g
- Br'er
- Bruisey Peets
- CrushnPain
- DAIS
- Forgetter
- The Galaxy Electric
- Hallowed Bells
- Hollow Boys
- Laughing Man
- Loi Loi
- Luna Honey
- Nyxy Nyx
- Ó (formerly Eskimeaux)
- Park Snakes
- Pree
- Reighnbeau
- Sister Grotto
- Sleepy Kitty
- Stronger Sex
- Swoll
- Tadzio
- Tölva
