= Hope Music Group =

Cameroonian record label

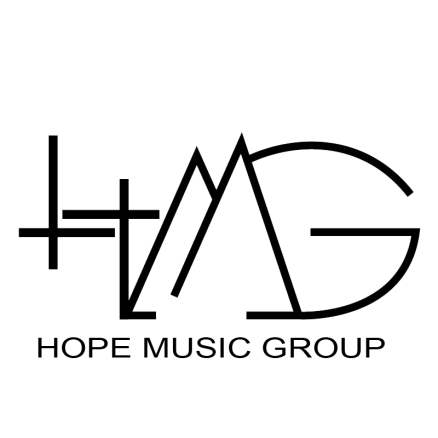
- Company type: Subsidiary
- Industry: Music and entertainment
- Genre: Pop music World music Hip hop and R&B
- Founded: February 17, 2012
- Headquarters: Douala, Cameroon
- Area served: Worldwide
- Products: Promotion; Distribution; Publishing; Licensing
- Parent: Philjohn Investment Holding
- Website: hmg.cm

Hope Music Group (sometimes known plainly by the initials as, HMG) is a Cameroonian record label that mainly produces hip hop, urban & popular music. It is distributed by The Orchard, a subsidiary of Sony Music Entertainment. The label produces and distributes various artists as Locko, J-Rio, Fanicko, Dynastie le tigre, Michael Kiessou, Featurist, Duc-Z and record labels as White House Music, Tiger Production, MKO Music.
Hope Music Group was founded by Philippe Nkouaya in 2012. The label's first release was a mixtape by his music producer Philjohn.

== History ==
=== 2011–2014 : DeadZone Recordz to Hope Music ===
The company was founded in February 2012 by Philippe Nkouaya and Anthony Gorby in Douala, Cameroon. But before the era, the premises of the label was based on a previous label founded by Philippe and associates, DeadZone Recordz which was shut down in 2011. Active independent label in popular music, the company developed many activities to offer a formula as 360 deals (music recording, visual content production, development, promotion and music publishing). HMG signed independent artists as Michael Kiessou, Yvich and gained partnerships with MTN Cameroon (AIM), Putumayo World Music (Content connect Africa) .

=== 2014–2016 : Sony Music/The Orchard Partnership ===
In April 2015, HMG entered an exclusive distributed deal with Sony Music Entertainment's main distribution service company The Orchard (company) for a 4-year deal.

HMG energized the breakthrough of Cameroonian urban music by managing artists and developing urban music styles in Cameroon and abroad.
The label catalog is rather modern, Pop, Contemporary R&B, world music, electronic music, reggae, soul and hip-hop. The label released several projects such as Partage EP of Michael Kiessou, La loi de la nature of Dynastie le tigre and Parti De Rien of Georges Breezy.

=== 2016–present : Philjohn Investment Holding and restructuring ===
In November 2016, HMG had new shareholders such as HTD & Penthold, which bought the respective shares of Armel Nango and Philippe Nkouaya. HMG becomes a subsidiary of Henthold and joins the conglomerate with sister companies Hope Music Publishing, Hope Management & Consulting (HOMCO), YASHA Corp., Hope Clothing, Philjohn Technologies & Hope Entertainment Pictures (HentPix).

In February 2017, an edition service is coupled with those of the label via the sister company Hope Music Publishing which has a catalog of more than 700 songs and added to that of HMG, brings back a catalog of more than 1000 songs. In November 2017 hope music group signs a distribution deal with a Gabonese label the node music through Kiss levray.

== List of Hope Music Group labels and artists ==
In January 2017, the label subdivided its large catalog into 3 under separate labels, Binam Nation, Easy Hits Recordz & Bakwaaba Muzik. Each catalog has specific services and specializes in specific areas.

=== Artistes ===
PRESENT

- Andy Jemea
- Dynastie le tigre
- Featurist
- Ghix
- J-Rio
- Kôba Building
- Michael Kiessou
- Sonia Kay
- Vicky
- Zyon Stylei
- Peka (artiste)

PRIOR ARTISTS

- Fanicko, for Trace TV
- Kayla Lys
- Locko, for Universal Music Group
- Nelly Moukoko
- Obeytheking
- Tenor, for Universal Music Group
- Valeri Williams, for Keyzit
- Yvich

=== Publishing ===
Artists

- DJ Kessy
- DJ Kriss
- LMTY
- Ovadoz
- Philjohn
- Tris

Distributed Labels

- King Kurtis Entertainment
- Clovis Music
- Tatco Group
- LJ Music

== Discography ==
=== 2013 – 2016 ===
- No More Stranger vol.1 – Philjohn
- Jemea – Andy Jemea
- Partage – Michael Kiessou
- La Loi de la nature – Dynastie le tigre
- Parti de rien – Georges Breezy
- Partage Deluxe – Michael Kiessou
- No More Stranger vol.2 – Philjohn
- La loi de la nature (Deluxe Edition) – Dynastie le tigre

=== 2017 ===
- Mon Elan – Serum
- Homog3ne – Dynastie le tigre
- Kayfriends – Sonia Kay
- Jabea (EP) – Yvich
- Nomtema – Michael Kiessou

=== 2018 ===
- The Bridge – Locko
- Blvck Roses – Kôba Building
- Heros – J-Rio
- Comme Une Etoile – Zyon Stylei
- No Luv – LeHess
- Point G – Ghix
- Arrete Nous Si Tu Peux – Featurist
- V3rsatile – Seoud Drums

== Awards and recognition ==
| Year | Artist | Award show | Category | Results |
|---|---|---|---|---|
| 2013 | Dynastie le tigre | RDCM – soirée de l'excellence | Best male artist | Won |
| 2014 | Dynastie le tigre | Ya'Fe Festival | Best performer | Won |
| 2014 | Dynastie le tigre | Balafon Music Awards | Best rookie of the year | Won |
| 2014 | Dynastie le tigre | KR Awards | Best male rookie of the year | Won |
| 2015 | Michael Kiessou | Canal 2'OR | Best video (tourner les reins) | Won |
| 2015 | Michael Kiessou | Greenlight Awards | Best Male artist | Won |
| 2015 | Michael Kiessou | KR Awards | Prix spécial du jury | Won |
| 2015 | Dynastie le tigre | Balafon Music Awards | Best male vocals | Won |
| 2016 | Michael Kiessou | MTN Zik Awards | Most downloaded artist | Won |
| 2016 | Dynastie le tigre | MTN Zik Awards | Most downloaded artist | Won |
| 2016 | Yvich | MTN Zik Awards | Most downloaded artist | Won |
| 2016 | Featurist | MTN Zik Awards | Most downloaded artist | Won |
