= Difosa =

Guatemalan music record distributor

Distribuidora Fonográfica Centroamericana, S.A.
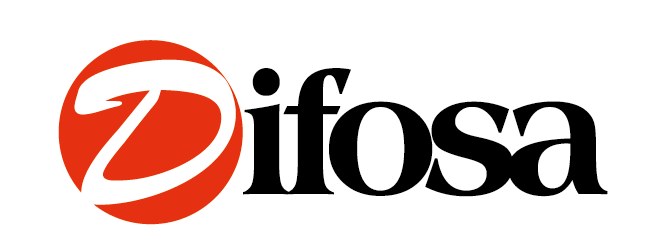
- Parent company: Grupo DIFOSA
- Founded: 1985; 41 years ago
- Founder: Carlos René Piril Pineda
- Genre: Marimba, Tropical, Instrumental, Ranchera, Folk, Christian, Ballad, Latin Pop and Rock
- Country of origin: Guatemala
- Location: Guatemala City
- Official website: difosamusic.store

Distribuidora Fonográfica Centroamericana, S.A., known as Difosa is a Guatemalan record label based in Guatemala City, owned by Grupo DIFOSA. It is known for distributing Guatemalan and Central American music.

It was founded in 1985 as VYPRO (Ventas y Promociones Especiales) distributing local music already recorded. In 1995 it would merge with Production Caribbean Music (PCM) and Record Sound (RS) to form Difosa. In 2009 he would become a member of the International Federation of the Phonographic Industry (IFPI).

== Artists ==
- Marimba Internacionales Conejos
- Miguel Ángel Tzul y su Marimba Orquesta
- Checha y su India Maya
- Marimba Orquesta Alma Tuneca
- Marimba Orquesta Sonora Ideal
- Marimba Orquesta La Voz de Zunil
- Marimba Orquesta La Gran Manzana
- Marimba Orquesta Nicho y sus Cachorros
- Marimba Maderas Chapinas
- Marimba Usula Internacional
- Marimba María Concepción
- Paco Oliva y Los Francos
- Ronald y Los Bravos
- Aníbal y Los Herederos del Bordo
- Y2K (Way Two Key)
- Arturo Xicay
- Marimba Perla de Guatemala y sus Saxofones
- Cynthia Arana
- Banda Santa Cecilia
- Banda La Auténtica del Compa Jacinto
- Marimba de Concierto de Chichicastenango
- Marimba Ixtia Jacalteca
- Enviados de Cristo
- RDE Band
- Roberto Rey
- César de Guatemala
- Cuarto Creciente
- La Horchata Regular Band
