= Arto Records =

1920s American record company

- Parent company: Standard Music Roll Company
- Founded: 1920
- Defunct: 1923
- Status: Defunct
- Genre: Blues, jazz
- Country of origin: U.S.
- Location: New York City

Arto Records was a record company and label that operated from 1920 to 1923.

Arto was owned by the Standard Music Roll Company in Orange, New Jersey. The recording studio was located in New York City. Arto was one of the first labels to issue releases of vaudeville blues musicians. It also issued Lucille Hegamin and the Original Memphis Five.

Arto issued a Black Label series of popular music including such artists as The California Ramblers and Vernon Dalhart, and a Red Label series of classical and ethnic music that included the Peerless Quartet and Fred Van Eps.

Arto pressed masters for other record companies, including Nordskog Records for Kid Ory's band, the first black band from New Orleans to be recorded, and Arto's sister company Bell Records. The label licensed masters from other companies, particularly for release on the Red Label series.

== See also ==
- List of record labels
