= Weapons (band) =

Icelandic indie rock band

- Origin: Reykjavík; Iceland
- Genres: Indie rock Alternative rock Punk rock
- Years active: 2003 – Present
- Label: Future Records
- Members: Hreinn; Oli Dori; Moni
- Website: www.weaponsmusic.com

Weapons are an indie/pop indie/punk band from Iceland.

== Band members ==
- Hreinn (Vocals & Guitar)
- Óli Dóri (Bass)
- Moni (Drums & Vocals)

== Band biography ==
Weapons was born out of boredom. Óli Dóri, Hreinn and Moni, three guys who all wanted to do something exciting, formed a band and the plan was to do something different from what was going on at the time in Reykjavík. The guys officially christened the trio Weapons in 2005 and the group spent most of that year writing and rehearsing material in a loft in Reykjavík. With similar tastes in music the three began to develop the style and sound of their new band. When the trio gets together something is always bound to happen as the three have a connection that makes them unique. In 2006 the trio started to become a staple of Reykjavík's live scene. Having performed at all the major and minor festivals in Iceland they´ve gained a devoted following and experience on stage. In the summer 2007 the trio recorded their first LP, "A Ditch in Time". They met up with NY producer Gordon Raphael (The Strokes, Regina Spektor) who joined forces in the finishing of their first born LP. "A Ditch in Time" was released in Iceland in 2009 receiving positive reviews for its blend of early rock & roll music and punk rock with modern emphasis.

The Press: "Weapons, the highlight of the first night at the Icelandic Airwaves festival– Frenetic Power-Pop bashers, respectively. Three skinny boys from Iceland – summoned the largest contingent of admirers, as plenty in the crowd seemed to come just for them and left after. They quickly made with the catchy, kicking out focused, plaintive melodies that sometimes got lost in a full-throttle guitar attack." -Christian Hoard, The Rolling Stone Magazine, Iceland Airwaves 2006

"The best band on the bill at Organ Saturday night…… people that remained were treated to a vibrant, bracing set by the Reykjavík power-pop trio Weapons. Weapons are the perfect example of a simple thing done right: their songs don’t stretch any borders or look to pull off any tricky genre-splices. They’re just simple, guitardriven pop songs delivered with spirit and spunk, drummer Sigurmon and frontman Hreinn trading off vocal duties and teaming up for choruses that soared sky high. At their best moments, they recalled prime Sugar: indelible choruses driven by hot rodding guitars." -J. Edward Keyes, eMusic, Iceland Airwaves 2008

"Weapons are a staple of Reykjavík´s live scene and can be found playing shows at some dive or the other most weekends of the year. Their dedication to their craft has ensured that they are an extremely tightly knit trio, featuring stage moves par excellence." -Haukur Magnússon, Reykjavík Grapevine 2007

== Discography ==
=== Albums ===
- Weapons, January 1, 2006.
- A Ditch in Time, August 20, 2009.
- It's Time (alternative mixes), 2010.

=== Singles ===
- "Things Between", June 2006
- "Mister Mister", March 2007
- "Up Tight", January 2008
- "Whats going on", August 20, 2009.
