= Festival Records (American label) =

American record label

Festival Records was an American independent record label founded in 1961 by Herb Abramson, after his Blaze Records folded. It was distributed by King Records. The label released six singles and one album before it folded in 1962. None of its releases made the charts. Abramson revived the label in 1966, but was still unsuccessful.
