= Basic Replay =

Record label imprint

Founded by Moritz Von Oswald and Mark Ernestus of Rhythm and Sound, Basic Replay is an imprint in the Basic Channel record label family, focusing primarily on reissues of reggae albums and singles. Related to the Wackies reissue campaign, though not restricted to product from one label, Basic Replay releases are packaged to reflect the artwork associated with the originals, with 7" and 12" vinyl singles and LPs typically bearing the artwork, logos, and fonts found on the out-of-print releases. As much of the material has never before been available on compact disc, the CD reissues often recreate the aesthetics of the original packaging with minimal cosmetic changes.

The first Basic Replay release, Keith Hudson's Playing It Cool appeared on CD and LP in 2003. To date, the imprint has put out work from artists like Ijahman Levi, Jackie Mittoo, and White Mice, among others. Most Basic Replay products include both vocal tracks and instrumental dub versions.

== Discography ==
- Keith Hudson - Playing It Cool BRJT-0009 (LP/CD) (2003)
- Ackie - Call Me Rambo BRHW-003 (12") (2004)
- Keith Hudson - Flesh Of My Skin Blood Of My Blood BRATRA-1005 (LP/CD) (2004)
- Ijahman Levi - I Am A Levi BRIJL-01 (12") (2004)
- Willi Williams - Rocking Universally BRWW-1 (12") (2004)
- Tenastelin & Keety Roots - Burial Tonight BRVS-001 (12") (2005)
- Jackie Mittoo - Ayatollah BRJM-001 (12") (2005)
- Andrew Bees - Militant BRAB-001 (2005)
- King Culture presents: Cuss Cuss BRKC-1 (12") (2006)
- White Mice - It’s A Shame BRWM-1 (7") (2006)
- White Mice - Youths Of Today BRWM-2 (7") (2006)
- White Mice - Try A Thing BRWM-3 (7") (2006)
- White Mice - Tallawah BRWM-4 (7") (2006)
- White Mice - 7" Set BRWM-7S (7") (2006)
- White Mice - White Mice BRWMLP-1 (LP/CD) (2006)
- White Mice - Versions BRWMLP-2 (LP/CD) (2006)

== See also ==
- List of record labels
