= Airport Route Recordings =

Icelandic record label

Airport Route Recordings or Airport Route was an independent dance music house label based in Reykjavík, Iceland. Their name was derived from its location on the Reykjavik - Airport road. It was set up in 2007 as a digital download-only label. As of 2026, there have been no recent updates or releases from the company, and its operational status remains unclear.

Its biggest release to date has been Pete Lunn with his "Seasider" album.

Airport Route artists included musicians such as Simon Latham, Metadeko, Ingi, Pluggd, Megaman, and Johann Stone.
