= Eternal Summers =

American indie rock band

- Genres: Indie rock
- Years active: 2009–present
- Labels: Kanine
- Members: Nicole Yun; Daniel Cundiff; Jonathan Woods
- Website: kaninerecords.com/eternal-summers

Eternal Summers are an American indie rock band from Roanoke, Virginia, United States. Singer/guitarist Nicole Yun and drummer Daniel Cundiff started Eternal Summers in 2009 as a duo after being introduced by their eventual bassist, Jonathan Woods. Eternal Summers released their debut album, Silver, on Kanine Records in 2010. They enlisted bassist Jonathan Woods in 2012 before releasing their second album, Correct Behavior, also on Kanine Records. On March 4, 2014, they released their third album, The Drop Beneath, which was produced by Doug Gillard.

Their fifth album, Every Day It Feels Like I'm Dying..., was released in May 2018.

== Discography ==
Studio albums

- Silver (2010)
- Correct Behavior (2012)
- The Drop Beneath (2014)
- Gold and Stone (2015)
- Every Day It Feels Like I'm Dying... (2018)
