= Dixieland Jubilee Records =

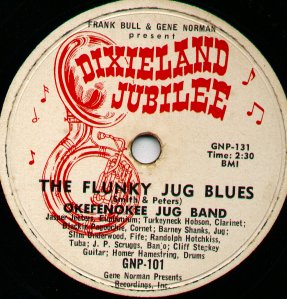

Dixieland Jubilee Records was an American record label during the 1950s that released Dixieland jazz. The label's roster included Teddy Buckner, Kid Ory, and Wild Bill Davison. Dixieland Jubilee was owned by Frank Bull and Gene Norman and run by Norman, who owned GNP Crescendo.

== See also ==
- List of record labels
