= American Recording Productions =

American record label

American Recording Productions was founded by Armenian musician Ara Topouzian in 1991. Over thirty recordings have been produced by ARP and continue to be produced. Distributed throughout the world, ARP specializes in traditional music of Armenia, Greece, and the Middle East.

== See also ==
- List of record labels
