= CD Vision =

Bangladeshi record label

- Status: Active
- Country of origin: Bangladesh

CD Vision is a Bangladeshi record label. It is also a film production house produce content including - short film, drama, showbiz news, telefilm, fiction, advertisement, music video and documentary.

== History ==
The YouTube channel crossed 1 lac subscribers and received Silver Button award from YouTube.

== See also ==
- List of Bangladeshi record labels
