= P Tune Studio =

- Industry: Music, record label, digital distribution
- Founded: 2018; 8 years ago
- Founder: Parag Kumar Biswas
- Headquarters: Alamdanga, Chuadanga, Bangladesh
- Area served: Worldwide
- Key people: Parag Kumar Biswas (founder)
- Services: Music distribution, music licensing, Content ID, royalty collection, publishing administration
- Website: ptune.io

P Tune Studio is a Bangladeshi record label and music distribution company founded in 2018 by music director Parag Kumar Biswas. It distributes music to digital streaming platforms and administers music licensing.

== History ==
P Tune Studio was founded in 2018 by Parag Kumar Biswas, a music director from Alamdanga, Chuadanga. It began as a record label working with independent Bangladeshi artists, and later expanded into a digital music distribution platform.

In November 2024, the company signed a music licensing agreement with TikTok covering royalty payments to Bangladeshi composers and lyricists whose work is used on the platform. Founder Parag Kumar Biswas said that TikTok's music rights management for all of the company's artists and partners would henceforth be operated from Bangladesh. The company has been described as Bangladesh's first independent digital music licensing and distribution platform.

The label has released recordings by Bangladeshi artists, including Mahtim Shakib, whose song "Suicide Note" was released through the label; Belal Khan; and Kazi Shuvo, whose single "Moner Line-e Aay" was released by the label in February 2026. Biswas has also appeared as a model in Mahtim Shakib's music videos.

== Services ==
According to the company, P Tune Studio distributes music and music videos to more than 100 digital platforms, including Spotify, Apple Music, YouTube Music and TikTok, and provides YouTube Content ID, royalty collection, publishing administration and rights management services. In February 2026, the news site Songbad Prokash listed P Tune Studio among five notable music distribution companies in Bangladesh.
