= Cavetone Records =

American record label

Cavetone Records is a vinyl-only record label founded based out of Columbia, Missouri. The label was founded in 2008 by Columbia, MO musician Scott Walus releasing all-analog recordings which are recorded and mastered to open reel tape without the aid of any digitization. Cavetone is a part of a growing trend in Independent labels releasing vinyl exclusively and an overall trend in the increase in record sales. While the label releases garage rock, it follows more of a punk DIY business model of Dischord or Lookout! in the 1980s allowing bands complete creative control, and operating not-for-profit with bands sharing any profits.
