= Elypsia Records =

Belgium record label

Elypsia Records, a Brussels-based record label founded in 1995 by Gregory Lacour which focuses on bringing innovative, groundbreaking electronic dance music.

Past releases include productions by the likes of Claude Young, Kenny Larkin, Stacey Pullen aka Kosmic Messenger, Dan Curtin, Sebastian S, Scan 7, Wyndell Long, K Alexi Shelby, DJ Deg, Jay Denham, Donnell Knox, Bochum Welt, Fabrice Lig, Technasia & many others.

A&R: Gregory Lacour
