= The Bedtime Record =

The Bedtime Record is a defunct record label that began in Chattanooga, Tennessee, in 1997 by Jake Cunningham. The label was born from an idea to release 7-inch compilations with four bands on each record, two from the United States and two from Europe. All releases were limited edition (500–1000 copies) in vinyl format. The label also released several 7-inch singles and a 10-inch split. The bands included Golden, The Microphones, Wookieback, Orange Cake Mix, Bob Hund, Le Mans, Spring, Dent, The Ruby Dare and Fegan among others.

Many of the bands featured in these releases were in the early stages of their musical careers and went on to gain wider recognition. Most notably, Phil Elvrum of The Microphones released his critically acclaimed album The Glow Pt. 2, which received a 9.1 rating from Pitchfork.com. Two members of Washington, D.C.'s Golden went on to form the international Benga-rock band Extra Golden and sign to Thrill Jockey Records. In 2007, Extra Golden gained much attention when two of their Kenyan members had visa issues prior to the Chicago World Music Festival. Then-Senator Barack Obama stepped in to help the two musicians gain permission to enter the US. Wookieback leader John Ringhofer released multiple records as Half-Handed Cloud, as well as collaborations with Sufjan Stevens and Daniel Smith of Danielson and Sounds Familyre.

== Artists ==
- Golden
- The Microphones
- Wookieback
- Orange Cake Mix
- Bob Hund
- Philemon Arthur and the Dung
- 22-Pistepirkko
- Le Mans
- Dent
- Spring
- The Ruby Dare
- Fegan
- Buttonpusher

== See also ==
- List of record labels
