= Aphonia Recordings =

American independent record label

- Founded: 2006
- Founder: Andrew Senna, Ben L. Robertson
- Genre: Experimental, electroacoustic
- Country of origin: U.S.
- Location: Seattle, Washington
- Official website: www.aphoniarecordings.com

Aphonia Recordings is an independent record label founded by Ben L. Robertson and Andrew Senna in Seattle, Washington in 2006. Mostly regarded as an outlet for digital releases of experimental and ambient music, Aphonia also has released more pop oriented artists such as Desolation Wilderness and Slim Twig. Both signed with major labels.

== Formation ==
Robertson and Senna both grew up in Spokane, Washington, and met in high school and soon after began playing music together. Although their collaborations remained intermittent through their teenage years, they would later find themselves both studying experimental music composition at The Evergreen State College in Olympia, Washington. They received school credit for organizing and promoting a showcase of experimental works at Evergreen, citing this experience as one that led them to produce shows and promote artists in the future.

== Business model ==
Senna and Robertson used a business model capitalizing on the low overhead associated with digital only releases. According to the label's website, by designing their own website from which music fans could purchase digital only releases they became one of the first labels to offer a truly independent online store with no DRM copy protection. While most of their catalog is available in digital only format on their website, the iTunes Music Store and Amazon, they also have limited physical releases, usually hand made by the artists themselves in very limited runs.

The label only signs their artists to single release deals preferring to allow their artists freedom to release on other labels. In addition, operating their own online store front makes the percentage of profit from the retail price unusually high, especially for a label releasing esoteric and niche market music. Both have expressed their desire to cut down on what they see as waste byproducts of the music industry, i.e. plastic for CDs, plastic jewel cases, fuel for transportation and distribution.

== Showcases and festivals ==
Through organizing live performances for their artist's the label continues not only to distribute music but provide a venue for it as well. Not long after its formation, Aphonia Recordings became an organizational member of Gallery 1412, a non-profit corporation operating in Seattle's Central District. The label, as a member of the organization, held well over 20 showcases, benefits and shows at the venue. The label has made live recordings of the shows available through a podcast, mainly created and written by Senna. However, this limited format has given way to more substantive explorations of particular artists through narrative storytelling and interpretive analysis of the artist's work.

The label is also a supporter and sponsor of many Pacific Northwest experimental and fringe festivals including the Olympia Experimental Music Festival in Olympia, Washington, the Occultural Music Festival and most recently the Carousel Festival, both based in Seattle, Washington. Many on the labels roster of artists perform at these festivals.

== Attention in the press ==
While steadily releasing music since its inception a great deal of press attention has been paid on the young label. Both of Seattle's weekly independent newspapers The Stranger (newspaper) and the Seattle Weekly regularly cover and review the labels showcases and festival sponsorship efforts. In addition to interest by the alternative press in Seattle, the label also enjoys regular listings in regional news outlets, such as the Tacoma News Tribune. As alumni of Evergreen State College, Robertson and Senna were profiled in the Spring 2009 Evergreen magazine. Their artists releases have been reviewed by Foxy Digitalis, Heathen Harvest, The Wire UK, Textura, and Cyclic Defrost.

== Roster ==
- Agnes Szelag
- Amy Denio
- Andrew Senna
- Ben L. Robertson
- Bill Horist
- Daedelum
- Darwinsbitch
- Denis & Denyse
- Derek M. Johnson
- Desolation Wilderness
- Divorce Party
- Dokuro
- Emily Pothast
- Gabriel Will
- Giant Expanding Pictures
- KRGA
- Jackie An
- Kelli Frances Corrado
- L.A. Lungs
- Mangled Bohemians
- Marriage + Cancer
- Matt Shoemaker
- Miguel Baptista Benedict
- Mood Organ
- Myello Electronics
- Nucular Aminals
- Paintings for Animals
- Planar Defecs
- Rachel Carns
- Slim Twig
- Unicorns in the Snow
- Warren Lee
