= Fierce Angel =

UK-based record label

- Founded: 2006
- Founder: DJ Mark Doyle
- Status: Active
- Country of origin: United Kingdom
- Official website: http://www.fierceangels.com

Fierce Angel is a UK-based record label set up in 2006 by DJ Mark Doyle. The label employs a handful of DJs, sponsors special club night events, and employs a lifestyle marketing approach in regard to its endeavors.

== History ==
Doyle (as well as several other employees and illustrator Jason Brooks) left the house music label Hed Kandi mid-2005 to start a new label – Tokyo Project. Their first CD, Tokyo Project: The Collection, was released in late 2005. However, fees resulting from a legal dispute with Hed Kandi forced Tokyo Project to close.

Doyle then set up the Fierce Angel label and released their first CD, Tokyo Disco, in early 2006. Subsequent releases have dropped the Tokyo reference altogether.

Fierce Angel have also begun to set up residencies with some nightclubs in the United Kingdom, as well as some summer presence in Ibiza. Currently Fierce Angel hold events in over 20 clubs in the UK and 10 overseas including the United States, Amsterdam, Portugal, Colombia, Norway, Barcelona, Manila, Ibiza and many more.

== Radio show ==
The Fierce Angel Radio Show is broadcast every week to over 25 countries around the world and is also broadcast on many stations in the UK. The show is presented by Mark Doyle and produced by Fierce Angel DJ George Elliott

== Releases ==
Similar to Doyle's releases when with Hed Kandi, the CD compilations are mostly divided into genres with some crossover. All releases contain 3 discs except Fierce Disco V and VI, which contain 2 discs, and A Little Fierce, which contains 1 disc. Digital Angel 2006, Es Vive and A Little Fierce are mixed, while the other releases are unmixed.

Year	Title	Notes	Catalog number	Ref
2006	Tokyo Disco	The Tokyo title was inherited from the defunct Tokyo Project as a way to "connect the dots" between the two companies.	FIANCD1	
2006	Fierce Angel Presents Beach Angel		FIANCD2	
2006	Es Vive Ibiza 2006		FIANCD3	
2006	Fierce Angel		FIANCD4	
2006	Digital Angel			
2007	Fierce Disco		FIANCD6	
2007	Beach Angel 2007		FIANCD7	
2007	Es Vive Ibiza 2007		FIANCD8	
2007	Digital Angel 2007		FIANCD9	
2007	Angels Fall		FIANCD5	
2007	A Little Fierce		FIANCDSAMP1	
2008	Fierce Disco II		FIANCD10	
2008	Beach Angel III		FIANCD12	
2008	Es Vive Ibiza 2008		FIANCD13	
2008	Angels Fall II		FIANCD11	
2008	A Little Fierce II		FIANCDSAMP2	
2009	Fierce Disco III		FIANCD14	
2009	Fierce Disco: Remixed		FIANCD15	
2009	El Divino Ibiza 2009		FIANCDSAMP4	
2009	Fierce Angel : The Collection		FIANCOMP16	
2009	A Little Fierce III		FIANCDSAMP3	
2009	"Forgiveness"	Wamdue Project		
2010	Fierce Disco IV		FIANCOMP18	
2010	Beach Angel IV			
2010	A Little Fierce: Remixed		FIANCOMP17	
2010	"A Little Sensitivity"	Peyton		
2010	"Kingdom of Pretty"	Bonnie Bailey		
2010	Bonnie Bailey: The EP	Bonnie Bailey		
2010	The Answer (Vols. 1 & 2)	Bassmonkeys		
2010	"Love is the Music"	FR feat. Jenny		
2010	Fac15: The EP	Fac15		
2010	Electrojunkies (EP)	Electrojunkies		
2010	Eric Kupper presents The EP (Vol. 1)	Eric Kupper		
2010	"DJ"	Ultravibe		
2010	"Haven't You Heard"	Fac15 feat. Cathi O		
2010	"Purple Haze"	Bassmonkeys		
2010	"Neon Lights"	Electrojunkies feat. Therese		
2010	Forgiveness (Vols. 1 & 2)	Wamdue Project feat. Jonathan Mendelsohn		
2010	"Baker Street"	The Fierce Collective feat. Peyton & Lady V		
2010	"Love U More"	Oxford Hustlers and Katherine Ellis		
2011	Es Vive Ibiza 10th Anniversary Edition			
2012	Fierce Disco V			
2013	Fierce Disco VI			

== See also ==
- Lists of record labels
