= Sam Fan Thomas =

Cameroonian musician

- Born: Samuel Thomas Ndonfeng; April 1952 (age 74); Bafoussam, Cameroon
- Genres: Makossa
- Occupations: Musician, guitarist, singer
- Instruments: Guitar, percussion, bass guitar, keyboard
- Years active: 1968–present

Sam Fan Thomas (born Samuel Thomas Ndonfeng, April 1952, Bafoussam, Cameroon) is a Cameroonian musician associated with Makossa. He began in the late 1960s and had his first hit with "Rikiatou". His "African Typic Collection" was an international hit in 1984 and is perhaps his best-known work. Thomas began his career in the early 1970s as a guitarist in the Cameroonian band Tigres Noires. He stayed with that band until 1976 when he launched his solo career.

== Career ==
He started his musical career in 1968 when he joined The Black Tigers, led by the blind musician, Andre Marie Tala. He stayed with Tala for eight years, recording several singles. The band also recorded in Paris and toured Senegal and other African countries. During this period Tala developed his tchamassi rhythm, a modern music style based on Bamileke folklore.

In 1976, his first solo LP was Funky New Bell, recorded in Benin on the Satel label. A second LP, on the same label, followed in 1977. On that album, he was supported by the Black Santiagos from Benin. His third release came in 1982 in Nigeria, with the hit song "Rikiatou", which established his reputation in Cameroon. In 1983, Thomas traveled to Paris to record Makassi. Makassi is the name of Thomas' music style, a type of uptempo makossa blended with a touch of Andre Marie Tala's tchamassi and other bamileke influences. The album contained the hit song, "African Typic Collection". This song was built around the melody of the Franco song, "Boma l'heure", and became an international dance floor hit, with sales across Africa, France, and the West Indies, where it was also released as a 12-inch single. Makassi brought Thomas a golden disc in 1984 which was followed by his fifth album, Neng Makassi in 1985. The album retained the sophisticated production of Makassi, without matching his greatest hit. In 1986, he released two albums, Funk Makassi and Makassi Plus. Together with the "African Typic Collection", two tracks off Makassi Plus was released in 1987 on a compilation album by the British Earthworks record label. Makassi Plus was followed in 1988 by Makassi Again, which was distributed internationally by the Celluloid record label. Thomas also toured with his band MBC (Makassi Band Corporation) in West and East Africa, Europe, and the Americas.

From the early 1990s, Thomas changed his focus from recording his material to promoting and guiding new talented Cameroonian singers and musicians. He gathered talented musicians, including the late Kotto Bass, Ebelle Jeannot, K. Godefroy, Fabo Claude, Guy Bilong, and Tala Jeannot, at Makassi Plus Studio in Douala. He released a string of records from various artists during the 1990s. Thomas released new material in 1993's Emotion and 1999's No Satisfaction. Neither of these CDs brought him the success of his earlier work.

He performed successful shows in Nairobi (2007), the United States (2009) and Abidjan (2010).

== Discography ==
=== Selected albums ===
- Makassi (1984)
- Makassi Again (1988)
- Si tcha (1994)
- Best of Sam Fan Thomas (1995)
- No Satisfaction (1999)
- Douala (2000)
