= List of record labels: R–Z =

This is a list of notable record labels, starting with R–Z.

List of record labels
A–H	I–Q	R–Z	0–9

R–Z

== R ==
- R&S Records
- R.I.P Society Records
- Rabid Records
- Racetrack Records
- Radar Records (UK)
- Radar Records (U.S. label)
- Radiant Future Records
- Radiex Records
- Radikal Records
- Radio Killa Records
- Radioactive Records
- Ragged Flag
- Ragnarock
- Rainbow Records
- Rajon Music Group
- Rak Records
- Ralph Records
- RAM Records (UK)
- Ram Records (US)
- Rama Records
- RandM Records
- Range Life Records
- Ranwood Records
- Rap-A-Lot Records
- Rappers Rapp Records
- RareNoiseRecords
- RAS Records
- Raster-Noton
- Raven Records (Canadian label)
- Ravenous Records
- Raw Energy Records
- Rawkus Records
- Razor & Tie
- Razzia Records
- RCA Camden
- RCA Inspiration
- RCA Italiana
- RCA Music Group
- RCA Records
- RCA Records Nashville
- RCA Red Seal Records
- RCA Victrola
- RCA/Jive Label Group
- Re-Constriction Records
- Reach Records
- React Music Limited
- Reaction Records
- Ready Records
- Real Talk Entertainment
- Real World Records
- Rebel Records (US)
- Rebel Records (France)
- Rebelle Records
- Rebelles Européens
- Recess Records
- Recommended Records
- Recorded In Hollywood
- Recorte Records
- Recreational Records
- RecRec Music
- Red Beet Records
- Red Bird Records
- Red Bull Records
- Red Eye Records
- Red Hammer Records
- Red House Records
- RED Music
- Red Pajamas Records
- Red Records
- Red Rhino Records
- Red Rooster Records
- Red Star Records
- Redeye Distribution
- Redline Records
- RedOne Records
- Reel Life Productions
- Reflective Records
- Reflex Records
- Refuge Records
- Regain Records
- Regal Recordings (1914)
- Regal Records (1920)
- Regal Records (1921)
- Regal Records (1949)
- Regal Zonophone Records
- Regency Records (Canada)
- Regency Records (United States)
- Regent Records (UK)
- Regent Records (US)
- Regis Records
- Reinforced Records
- Rekords Rekords
- Relapse Records
- Relativity Records
- Relentless Records
- Remington Records
- Remote Control Records
- Renaissance Recordings
- Rendezvous Records
- Repeat Records
- Repertoire Records
- Rephlex Records
- Reprise Records
- Republic Records
- Reservoir Records
- Resipiscent
- Resistance Records
- Resonance Records
- Restless Records
- Rethink
- Retroactive Records
- Reunion Records
- Rev-Ola Records
- Reveal Records
- Revealed Recordings
- Revelation Records (hardcore punk)
- Revelation Records (jazz)
- Revenant Records
- Reverberation
- The Reverberation Appreciation Society
- Revival Records
- Revolver Music
- Revue Records
- R.E.X. Records (1987)
- Rex Records (1912)
- Rex Records (1933)
- Rex Records (1957)
- Rex Records (2001)
- Rhino Entertainment
- Rhymesayers Entertainment
- Rhythm King
- Rhythm Zone
- Rialto Records (1920s)
- Dischi Ricordi
- Ridge Runner Records
- Righteous Babe Records
- Riot City Records
- Rimas Entertainment
- Ripete Records
- Ripple Music
- Rise Above Records
- Rise Records
- Rising Tide Records
- Riva Records
- River Jones Music
- Rivermont Records
- Riverside Records
- RKO/Unique Records
- RMM Records & Video
- Roadrunner Records
- Robbins Entertainment
- Robotic Empire
- Rob's House Records
- Rob's Records
- Roc-A-Fella Records
- Roc-La-Familia
- Roc Nation
- Rock Action Records
- Rock 'n Roll Records
- Rock-O-Rama Records
- Rock Records
- Rock Ridge Music
- Rocket Girl
- The Rocket Record Company
- Rocketown Records
- Rockland Records
- Rod Fai Don Tri
- Rodven Records
- Rogue Music Alliance
- ROIR
- Rolling Stones Records
- Romeo Records
- Romophone
- Ron Johnson Records
- rooArt
- Roost Records
- Rooster Blues
- Ropeadope Records
- Rostrum Records
- Roswell Records
- Rotana Music Group
- Roton Music
- Rotorelief
- Rotters Golf Club
- Rotten Records
- Rotterdam Records
- Rough Trade Records
- Round Hill Music
- Roulé
- Roulette Records
- Rounder Records
- Route 66 Records
- Rowdy Records
- Roxy Recordings
- Royalty Records
- RPM Records (United States)
- RRRecords
- RS Group
- RSO Records
- Rubber Jungle Records
- Ruby Records
- Rubyworks Records
- Rude Boy Records
- Rude Records
- Ruf Records
- Ruff Ryders Entertainment
- Ruffhouse Records
- RuffNation Records
- Run for Cover Records
- Rune Grammofon
- Rural Rhythm Records
- Rushmore Records
- Rust Nashville
- Ruthless Records (Compton)
- Ruthless Records (Chicago)
- Rykodisc

== S ==
- S. Carter Records
- S-Curve Records
- S2 Records
- S2S (Japanese record label)
- Sabre Records
- Sacra Music
- Sacred Bones Records
- Sacred Records
- Saddle Creek Records
- Safari Records
- Safehouse Records
- Saga Entertainment (2017)
- Saga Records (1958)
- Sain
- Saja Records
- Salsoul Records
- Salted Music
- Samadhi Sound
- Sanctuary Records
- San Francisco Records
- Sandy Records
- Sappy Records
- SAR Records
- Sarah Records
- Sarathan Records
- Saravah
- Saregama
- Sargent House
- El Saturn Records
- Savoy Records
- Saw Recordings
- SBK Records
- Scantraxx
- Scared Records
- Scarlet Records
- Scat Records
- Scepter Records
- Schematic Records
- Schneeball
- Schoolboy Records
- SCI Fidelity Records
- Scion Audio/Visual
- Scitron Digital Contents
- Scotti Brothers Records
- Scratchie Records
- Screwgun Records
- Season of Mist
- Seclusiasis
- Secret City Records
- Secret Records
- Secretly Canadian
- Secretly Group
- Section 44 Records
- See Bee Records
- See for Miles Records
- See Thru Broadcasting
- Seed Records
- Seeland Records
- Select Records
- Selectric Records
- Self Immolation
- Selfmade Records
- Seraphim Records
- Serious Business Records
- Serjical Strike Records
- Service
- Setanta Records
- Seventh Rule Recordings
- Several Reasons
- Severn Records
- Sh-K-Boom Records
- Shadow Records
- Shady Records
- Shanachie Records
- Sheeba Records
- Sheer Sound
- Sheffield Tunes
- Shelter Records
- Shifty Records (South Africa)
- Shifty Records (United States)
- Shimmy-Disc
- Shitkatapult
- Shock Records
- Shout Records
- Shout! Studios
- Show Dog Nashville
- Shrapnel Records
- Sic Squared Records
- Sick Room Records
- SideOneDummy Records
- Sidewalk Records
- Sierra Records
- Sigma Editions
- Signature Records
- Signature Sounds Recordings
- Silas Records
- Silence Records
- Silkheart Records
- Silvertone Records (1916)
- Silvertone Records (1980)
- Silvertone Records (Selfridges) (1930s)
- SimG Records
- Simian Records
- Sims Records
- Sinnbus
- Sire Records
- Sister Benten Online
- Situation Two
- Six Degrees Records
- Six Shooter Records
- Ska Satellite Records
- Skam Records
- Skin Graft Records
- Skinny Dog Records
- Skint Records
- Skirl Records
- Skunk Records
- Sky Records
- Skylite
- Slam Dunk Records
- Slampt
- Slanted Records
- Slap-a-Ham Records
- Slash Records
- Slate Creek Records
- Slave Pit Inc.
- Sledgehammer Blues
- Sleeping Bag Records
- Slip-n-Slide Records
- Siltbreeze
- Slowdime Records
- SM Entertainment
- Small Stone Records
- Small Wonder Records
- Smalltown America Records
- Smalltown Superjazzz
- Smalltown Supersound
- Smash the House
- Smash Records
- Smells Like Records
- Smithsonian Folkways
- Smoke-a-Lot Records
- Snakes & Ladders Records
- Snapper Music
- SNOtone
- So So Def Recordings
- SoBe Entertainment
- The Social Registry
- Socialist Roots Sound System
- SOLAR Records
- Soleilmoon Recordings
- Soli Deo Gloria
- Solid Rock Records
- Solid State Records (metalcore)
- Solid State Records (jazz label)
- Solitary Man Records
- Som Livre
- Soma Records (U.S. label)
- Soma Quality Recordings
- Some Bizzare Records
- Somewherecold Records
- SonaBLAST! Records
- Sonar Kollektiv
- Sonet Records
- Song Bird Records
- Song, by Toad Records
- SongBird
- Sonic Past Music
- Sonic Unyon
- Sonic Vista Music
- Sonic Youth Recordings
- Sonic360 Records
- Sonorous Entertainment
- Sono Cairo
- SONS Records
- Sony BMG
- Sony Classical Records
- Sony Masterworks
- Sony Music
- Sony Music Australia
- Sony Music Entertainment Japan
- Sony Music Entertainment Poland
- Sony Music India
- Sony Music Latin
- Sony Music Mexico
- Sony Music Nashville
- Sony Music Philippines
- Sony Music Special Products
- Sony Music UK
- Sony Records
- Sony Urban Music
- Sordide Sentimental
- Soul City Records (American label)
- Soul Jazz Records
- Soul Temple Records
- Soulfuric Recordings
- Sound Document
- Sound of Gospel
- Sound of Pig
- Sound Riot Records
- Sound Stage 7
- Sound System Records
- Soundtek
- Soundway Records
- Source Music
- Sout El-Hob Records
- Soutelphan
- South Indies
- Southern Empire Records
- Southern Fried Records
- Southern Lord Records
- Southern Records
- Southern Studios
- Southland Records
- Spare Me Records
- Spark Records (US)
- Spark (UK record label)
- Sparmac
- Sparrow Records
- Spartan Records
- Sparton Records
- Specialist Subject Records
- Specialty Records
- Speed Label
- Spiderleg Records
- Spin Records (American label)
- Spin Records (Australian label)
- Spinalonga Records
- spinART Records
- Spinefarm Records
- Spinnin' Deep
- Spinnin' Records
- Spinnup
- Spirit Zone Records
- Spitfire Records
- Spivey Records
- Spoon Records
- Spotlite Records
- Spring Hill Music Group
- Springman Records
- SPV GmbH
- Squint Entertainment
- SRC Records
- SS Entertainment
- SST Records
- St. George Records
- Staalplaat
- Stage Door Records
- Stand Up! Records
- Standard Talking Machine Company
- StandBy Records
- Star Empire Entertainment
- Star Music
- Star Recordings
- Star Song Communications
- Star Trak Entertainment
- Starday Records
- Stardom Entertainment
- Stardust Promotion
- Starkland
- Starr Records
- StarRoc
- Starship Entertainment
- Starstream Records
- Startime International
- States Records
- Stateside Records
- Static Caravan Recordings
- Stax Records
- Stealth Records
- Steed Records
- Steel Tiger Records
- Steeltown Records
- Steelwork Maschine
- SteepleChase Records
- Step One Records
- Stereolaffs
- Sterling Records (Sweden)
- Sterling Records (US)
- Sterno Records
- Stickfigure Records
- Stiff Records
- Stigmata
- Stillborn Records
- Stmpd Rcrds
- Stockfisch Records
- Stockholm Records
- Stolen Recordings
- Stomp Records
- Stone Music Entertainment
- Stone Records
- Stone'd Records
- Stones Throw Records
- Stone Tapes
- Stony Plain Records
- Storyville Records (Karl Emil Knudson)
- Storyville Records (George Wein's)
- Straight Records
- Strange Famous Records
- Strange Fruit Records
- Strange Music
- Strange Ways
- Strata Records
- Strata-East Records
- Street Soul Productions
- StreetSounds
- Stretch Records
- Strictly Rhythm
- Studio 2 Stereo Records
- Studio One
- Studioseven Recordings
- Stunt Records
- Suave House Records
- Sub City Records
- Sub Pop
- Sub Rosa
- Sub Verse Music
- Sub•Lime Records
- Subconscious Communications
- Sublime Frequencies
- Submerged Records
- Subplate Records
- Subterranean Records
- Suburban Base
- Suburban Home Records
- Suburban Noize Records
- Suburban Records
- Suburban Sprawl Music
- The Subway Organization
- Sudden Death Records
- Sue Records
- Sugar Hill Records (bluegrass label)
- Sugar Hill Records (hip hop label)
- Sugar Music
- Suleputer
- Sumerian Records
- Summersteps Records
- Summit Records
- Sumthing Distribution
- Sun Records
- Suncity Records
- Sunday Best
- Sundazed Music
- Sunflower Records
- Sunset Alliance Records
- Sunset Records
- Sunshine Records (Australia)
- Sunshine Records (Philippines)
- Sunshine Records (United States)
- Suntrip Records
- Suomen Musiikki
- Super Records
- Supersoul Records
- Supertone Records
- Supraphon
- Supreme Records (Grey Gull subsidiary)
- Supreme Records (Los Angeles)
- Supreme Records (Pama subsidiary)
- Supreme Records (UK)
- Surfdog Records
- Suretone Records
- Surprise Attack Records
- Surprise Records
- Survivor Records
- Sussex Records
- Sutton Records
- Suzy
- SVR Producciones
- Swami Records
- Swan Records (rock and roll)
- Swan Records (jazz label)
- Swan Song Records
- Sweat it Out
- Swing Time Records
- Swishahouse
- Sword Records, Inc.
- Syco Music
- Sympathy for the Record Industry
- Symphonic Distribution
- Synthetic Entertainment
- Synthetic Plastics Company

== T ==
- T Records
- T-Neck Records
- T-Series
- Taang! Records
- Table of the Elements
- Tabu Recordings
- Tabu Records
- TAG Recordings
- Take Fo' Records
- Takeover Entertainment
- Takeover Records
- Takeover Roc Nation
- Takoma Records
- Talitres
- Talkin' Loud
- Tall Poppies Records
- Tangerine Records (1962)
- Tangerine Records (1992)
- Tankcrimes
- TANZA
- Tapete Records
- Tara Music
- Tarantula Records
- Tarantulas Records
- Tarantura
- Taste Media
- Taylor Gang Entertainment
- Discos Taxco
- Tayster and Rojac Records
- TBD Records
- Team Love Records
- Tectonic
- Tee Pee Records
- Tee Productions
- Teenage USA Recordings
- TeenBeat Records
- Teichiku Records
- Telarc International Corporation
- Teldec
- Teleprompt Records
- Tellus
- Telstar Records
- Tempa Recordings
- Temple Records (1978 UK label)
- Temple US Records
- Tempo Records (UK)
- Tempo Records (US)
- Temporary Residence Limited
- TEN Music Group
- Ten12 Records
- Tender Loving Empire
- Tennessee Records
- Tennman Records
- Tent Show Records
- Terror Squad Entertainment
- Tesco Organisation
- Test Tube Records
- Testament Records (UK)
- Testament Records (United States)
- Tetragrammaton Records
- Tetrapod Spools
- Texas Hotel Records
- Text Records
- Thee Sheffield Phonographic Corporation
- Thick Records
- Thick Syrup Records
- Think Music Records
- Thinner
- Third Man Records
- Third Mind Records
- Thirsty Ear Recordings
- This Is American Music
- Thizz Entertainment
- Three Gut Records
- Three One G
- Threshold House
- Threshold Records
- Thrill Jockey
- Thrive Music
- Thump Records
- Tico Records
- Tidy Trax
- Tiger Lily Records
- Tiger Style Records
- Tigerbeat6
- Tigersushi Records
- Tigertrap Records
- Timberyard Records
- Time Bomb Recordings
- Time Life
- Time Records
- Time Unlimited
- Time-Lag Records
- Timeless Records
- Tin Angel Records
- Tino Corp.
- Tiny Dog Records
- Tiny Evil Records
- Tirk Recordings
- Titanic Records
- TK Records
- TML Entertainment
- TNSrecords
- To the Fallen Records
- Todamerica Records
- Toes in the Sand Recordings
- Tofu Records
- Tokuma Shoten
- Tollie Records
- Tomato Head Records
- Tommy Boy Records
- Tompkins Square Records
- Too Pure
- Tooth & Nail Records
- Top Dawg Entertainment
- TOP Media
- Top Stop Music
- Tops Records
- Topshelf Records
- Topic Records
- TopTen
- Tôt ou Tard
- Touch and Go Records
- Touch Music
- Tower Records
- Track Records
- Trademark of Quality
- Tradisom
- Tradition Records
- Trance Syndicate
- Transatlantic Records
- Transcend Music
- Transcopic Records
- Transgressive Records
- Transmat
- Transmission Communications
- Trash Aesthetics
- Trash Art!
- Traum Schallplatten
- Trauma Records
- Trax Records
- Trekky Records
- Trend Is Dead! Records
- Trend Records (US)
- Trend Records (UK label)
- Trensmat Records
- Trente Oiseaux
- Trepan Records
- Tresor
- Trial & Error Records
- Tribe Records (US)
- Tribe Records (Norway)
- La Tribu
- Tribute Records
- Trifekta
- Trikont-Verlag
- Triple Crown Records
- Trisol Music Group
- Triumph Records (United Kingdom)
- Triumph Records (United States)
- Trix Records
- Trojan Records
- Troubleman Unlimited Records
- Tru 'Dat' Entertainment
- Tru Thoughts
- True North Records
- True Tone Records
- Trumpet Records
- Trunk Records
- Trust in Trance Records
- Trustkill Records
- TS Entertainment
- TSR Records
- TUARON
- Tuff City Records
- Tuff Gong
- Tumi Music
- Tumult Records
- Tunnel Records
- TUTL Records
- TVT Records
- Twenty Two Recordings
- Twin/Tone Records
- Twisted Nerve Records
- Twisted Records (UK)
- Twisted Records (U.S.)
- Tyscot Records
- Tzadik Records

== U ==
- Ubiquity Records
- Ugly Man Records
- Ugly Nephew Records
- United Hebrew Disc and Cylinder Company
- Ujikaji
- UK Records
- UKF Music
- Ultimae Records
- The Ultimate Group
- Ultra Records
- UMG Philippines
- Unable Records
- Unborde
- Unda K9 Records
- Under One Flag
- Undercover Prodigy
- Undergroove Records
- Underground Operations
- Underground, Inc.
- UNESCO Collection
- UNFD
- Ungulates
- Uni Records
- Unicorn Digital
- Unicorn-Kanchana
- Unidisc Music
- UNIFIED Music Group
- Union City Recordings
- Union Label Group
- United Artists Records
- United Records (1951)
- United Records (1910s)
- United Telefilm Records
- Universal Classics and Jazz
- Universal D
- Universal Edition
- Universal Motown Records
- Universal Motown Republic Group
- Universal Music Africa
- Universal Music Australia
- Universal Music Enterprises
- Universal Music Group
- Universal Music Group Nashville
- Universal Music Group Nigeria
- Universal Music India
- Universal Music Indonesia
- Universal Music Japan
- Universal Music Latin Entertainment
- Universal Music México
- Universal Music Polska
- Universal Music Russia
- Universal Music South Africa
- Universal Music TV
- Universal Records (1988)
- Universal Records (1995−2006)
- Universal Records (Philippines)
- University Recording Company
- Univision Music Group
- Unstable Ape Records
- Unsub Records
- Up Records
- Up-Front Group
- UpFront Records
- Uprising Records (US)
- Uprising Records (New Zealand)
- Upsetter Records
- Uptown Records
- Urban Jungle
- Urban Records
- URBNET Records
- Urgent! Records
- Urinine Records
- Utech Records
- Utopia Records

== V ==
- V Recordings
- V2 Records
- V-Disc
- V/Vm Test Records
- Vagrant Records
- Valcour Records
- Valentine Records
- Valiant Records
- Valley Entertainment
- Valley Records
- Valve Records
- Van Dyke Records
- Vandit
- Vanguard Records
- VAP
- Varèse Sarabande
- Variety Records
- VAWS
- VDE-Gallo Records
- VEB Deutsche Schallplatten
- Vee-Jay Records
- Velour Recordings
- Velvet Tone Records
- Vena Records
- Vendetta Records
- Vendlus Records
- Verity Records
- Vermin Scum
- Verse Music Group
- Vertigo Records
- Verve Forecast Records
- Verve Records
- Very Small Records
- VI Music
- Vicious Kitten Records
- Vicious Vinyl
- Vicor Music
- Disques Victoire
- Victor Talking Machine Company
- Victoria Records (1951)
- Victory Records
- Vik Recordings
- Vik Records
- The Village Thing
- Villain Entertainment
- Villar Records
- Vim Records
- Vinyl on Demand
- Vinyl Solution
- The Viper Label
- Virgin EMI Records
- Virgin Classics
- Virgin Music
- Virgin Music Group
- Virgin Records
- Virgin Schallplatten
- Virt Records
- V.I.S.A.
- Visible Noise
- Vision Quest Records
- Visionary Music Group
- Vitamin Records
- Viva Records (U.S.)
- Viva Records (Philippines)
- Vocalion Records
- Disques Vogue
- Vogue Records
- Voiceprint Records
- Voices of Wonder
- Volcano Entertainment
- Volcom Entertainment
- Volition Records
- Vortex Records
- Vox Records (US)
- Vox Records (Germany)
- VP Music Group
- VP Records

== W ==
- Wackie's
- Waerloga Records
- Wagram Music
- WakeOne
- Waldorf Music Hall Records
- Wall of Sound
- Walt Disney Records
- Wand Records
- Wanker Records
- Warcon Enterprises
- Warm Fuzz Records
- Warm Electronic Recordings
- Warner Alliance
- Warner Classics
- Warner Curb Records
- Warner Music Africa
- Warner Music Australia
- Warner Music Canada
- Warner Music Czech Republic
- Warner Music Group
- Warner Music Latina
- Warner Music Philippines
- Warner Music Poland
- Warner Music Sweden
- Warner Records
- Warner Strategic Marketing
- Warner-Spector Records
- Warp
- Warwick Records (United Kingdom)
- Warwick Records (United States)
- Water Lily Acoustics
- Waterbug Records
- Waterfront Records
- Watermelon Records
- WaterTower Music
- WAU! Mr. Modo Recordings
- Waveform Records
- Wave Music
- Wax Trax! Records
- Waxploitation Records
- We the Best Music Group
- We Put Out Records
- Weathermaker Music
- WEB Entertainment
- Webco Records
- Wedge Records
- Weewerk
- Welk Music Group
- De Werf
- WERGO
- Werkdiscs
- West End Records
- West Records
- Westbound Records
- WestCom
- Westminster Records
- Westpark Music
- Westport Records
- WGNS Recordings
- What? Records
- Whirlwind Recordings
- White Noise Records
- White Pine Music
- White Whale Records
- The Whitehaus Family Record
- Whitfield Records
- Whynot Records
- Wichita Recordings
- Wiiija
- Wild Pitch Records
- Wild Rags
- Wildside Records
- Williams Street Records
- Wind Music
- Wind-up Records
- Windfall Records
- Windham Hill Records
- Wing Records
- Winley Records
- The Winner Records
- Winter & Winter Records
- Witches Brew
- WM Entertainment
- WM Recordings
- WMOT Records
- Wooden Nickel Records
- Woodrich Records
- Woodsist
- Woodworm Records
- Woof
- Woollim Entertainment
- Word Entertainment
- Word Records
- Work Group
- Work It Baby
- World Circuit
- World Domination Recordings
- World Record Club
- World Serpent Distribution
- Wounded Bird Records
- WOW Music
- Wrasse Records
- Wrath Records
- WTII Records
- WWE Music Group
- WY Records
- Wynona Records

== X ==
- x2
- X5 Music Group
- Xanadu Records
- Xemu Records
- Xenophile Records
- XIII Bis Records
- XL Recordings
- XO
- Xploded Music
- Xpressway
- Xtra Mile Recordings
- Xtreem Music
- XYZ Records

== Y ==
- Y Records
- Yambo Records
- Yazoo Records
- YB Music
- YBNL Nation
- Year0001
- Yellow Tail Records
- Yep Roc Records
- YG Entertainment
- YG Plus
- YMC Entertainment
- York House Recordings
- Yoshitoshi Recordings
- Young
- Young God Records
- Young Money Entertainment
- YSL Records
- Yuehua Entertainment
- Yuletide Records

== Z ==
- Zappa Records
- Zarape Records
- Zarjazz
- ZE Records
- Zebra Records
- Zee Music Company
- Zéro musique
- Zero Records
- Zodiac Records (New Zealand)
- Zomba Group
- Zoom Lens
- Zone 4
- Zonophone
- Zoo Entertainment (US)
- Zoo Records (UK)
- Zoth Ommog Records
- ZTT Records
- Zunior
- ZYX Music

== See also ==
- List of electronic music record labels
- List of independent UK record labels
