= Suprema (disambiguation) =

Suprema are elements in order theory.

Suprema may also refer to:

- Suprema (comics), a superheroine

== See also ==
- Supreme (disambiguation)
- Supremo (disambiguation)
