= Supreme Records =

Supreme Records may refer to:

- Supreme Records (Grey Gull subsidiary), a subsidiary of Grey Gull Records in the 1920s
- Supreme Records (Pama subsidiary), a subsidiary of Pama Records
- Supreme Records (Los Angeles), a 1940s rhythm & blues label in Los Angeles
- Supreme Records UK, 1980s UK label

== See also ==
- Supreme (disambiguation)
