= Andy Sannella =

American jazz musician (1900–1962)

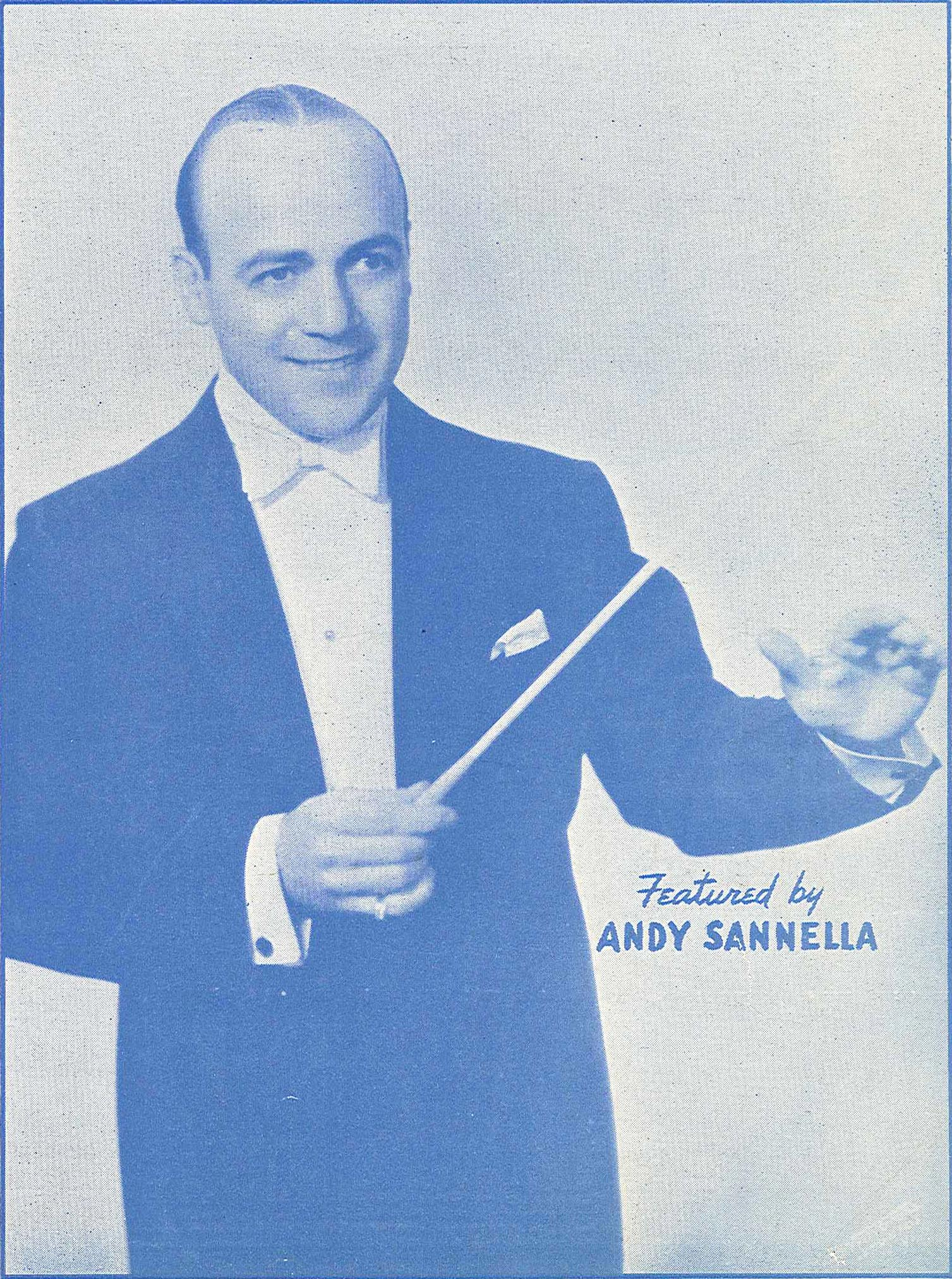
Andy Sannella in the mid-1930s

Anthony George "Andy" Sannella (March 11, 1900 – December 10, 1962) was an American musician and bandleader.

Andy Sannella was born in Brooklyn, NY. His father Anthony and mother Lucia were both Italian immigrants. Sannella was a multi-instrumentalist; according to jazz historian John Chilton he played violin, piano, organ, clarinet, alto saxophone, guitar (preferably steel guitar), banjo and vibraphone. Occasionally he also appeared as a singer.

== Early career with Ray Miller and other bandleaders ==
Sannella began his musical studies on guitar and violin at the age of ten. When he was fourteen, his father died; several years later, Andy decided to leave school and join the military. He was turned down at first because he was underage, but was finally able to join the Navy. After serving in the US Navy during World War I, Sannella spent the years 1920–1922 in Panama City working on violin and alto saxophone with various orchestras. He then settled in New York City where he played with the bands of Dan Gregory, Mike Markel and – not least – Ray Miller. With the latter orchestra Sannella seems to have made his first recordings during the years 1923–1925. On these recordings (which also feature jazz notables such as Frank Trumbauer and Miff Mole) Sannella is mainly featured on clarinet and alto saxophone, but is also heard soloing on bass clarinet on I Can't Get The One I Want (Brunswick 2643).

== As a studio musician ==
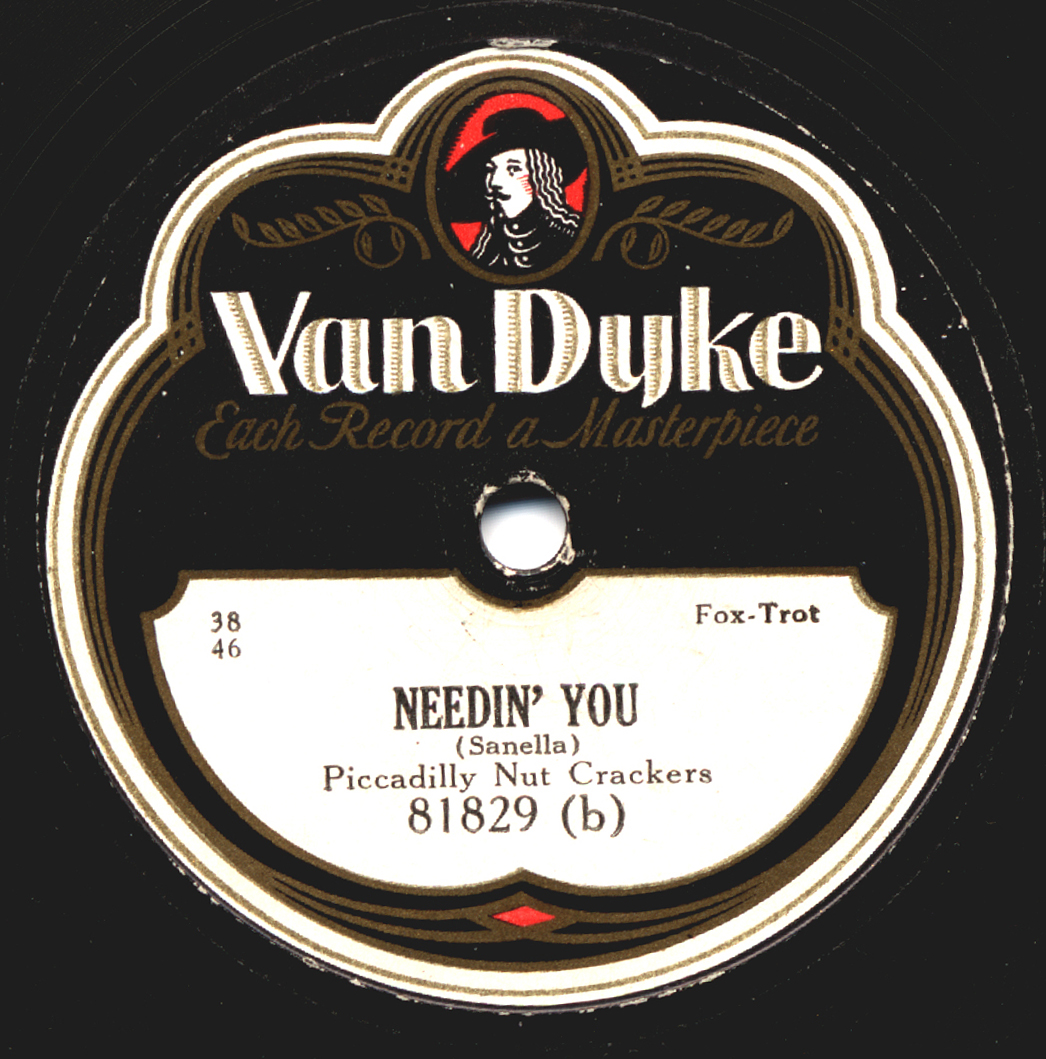
The label of an issue of Sannella's composition Needin' You on the Van Dyke label.

From the late 1920s onwards Sannella seems to have focused more and more on working as a studio musician rather than appearing with regular working bands. He was very much in demand and was hired by many conductors leading "house bands" for various record companies, including Nat Shilkret and Leonard Joy (both Victor Records), Ben Selvin (Columbia Records), Adrian Schubert (Banner Records and associated labels) and Bert Hirsch (Hit of the Week Records). Sannella also appears on several recordings directed by Sam Lanin, but it is not clear whether he also appeared with this orchestra on stage. In addition to working with larger orchestras Sannella also appeared with many smaller studio groups accompanying popular singers of the time such as Art Gillham, Cliff Edwards, Frank Crumit, Seger Ellis and Johnny Marvin.

In many of the orchestras listed above Sannella was working with the same basic core of fellow musicians, among these not least trumpet player Mike Mosiello, from whom Sannella seems to have been virtually inseparable during these years, and of whom he still spoke very highly in an interview shortly before his death. Amongst many other things Mosiello and Sannella (together with accordionist Charles Magnante) formed the nucleus of the prolific house band of the Grey Gull Company of Boston during the years 1926–1930. In addition to performing the popular tunes of the day Mosiello and Sannella were allowed to wax several instrumental numbers of their own, often appearing as B-sides on the company's "pop" records. On these records Sannella is mainly featured playing alto saxophone, clarinet and steel guitar, often switching between all these instruments during the same number and thus giving them a very special noticeable sound. An article in the Milwaukee Journal from 1929 also lists: the accordion, violin, and ukulele among the twelve instruments he played. Songs credited to Sannella himself issued by Grey Gull include Needin' You and Sleeping Birds.

== Recordings in his own name ==
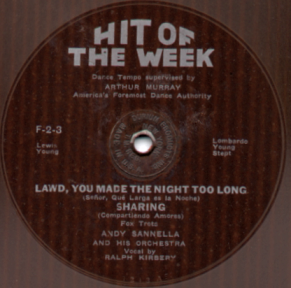
Hit of the Week record by Sannella's orchestra.

The Grey Gull records were almost always issued anonymously or under pseudonym. However, for other labels Sannella was allowed to record with bands under his own name (ranging from trios to full dance orchestras) given proper credit. Labels for which Sannella recorded under his own name included Harmony, Columbia, Okeh, Victor and Hit of the Week. For Brunswick Sannella also recorded as a steel guitar soloist, his coupling of Sliding on the Frets and Blues of the Guitar from 1929 (Brunswick 4484) becoming a minor hit and being issued in Europe as well (Slidin' On The Frets has also been reissued on CD).

Apparently these recordings made Sannella's name familiar enough to make The Selmer Company, a well known manufacturer of musical instruments, use Sannella's picture in their advertising. Sannella composed Valse Selmer to promote the company's saxophones.

== Later career: radio, theatre and television work ==
Beginning with 1932 Sannella's appearances on records became increasingly rarer. Instead he was heard frequently on radio where, among other things, he directed four NBC radio programs and performed on shows including the Sylvester Hour, the General Motors Hour, the Stromberg-Carlson Hour, the Halsey-Stuart Hour, with the Armstrong Quakers, and in the Lucky Strike Dance Orchestra. From the late 1940s he also appeared regularly on TV shows for CBS. By this date Sannella was mainly performing as a pianist and organ player. He also directed a couple of shows on Broadway.

Now and then Sannella also returned to the recording studios well into the 1950s. Among his last records is an LP called The Girl Friends (Everest SDBR-1005, issued in 1958) where he plays standards and jazz numbers that have titles consisting of girls' names.

== Personal information ==
Andy Sannella was a licensed amateur radio operator. He first learned Morse code when in the Navy, and later became interested in the ham radio hobby. His call letters were W2AD. He was also an experienced pilot, who used his own private plane to fly to concerts. He married his first wife, Aileen, in 1928. She was from Monoquet, Indiana, and they had a summer home there.

Andy Sannella died of a seizure on a street in New York.

== Sources ==
- John Chilton: Who's Who of Jazz (5th edition, London 1989)
- Ate Van Delden: liner notes for the CD Ray Miller and his Brunswick Orchestra 1924–1929 (Timeless Historical CBC 1–066)
- Brian Rust: The American Dance Band Discography 1917–1942 (New Rochelle, New York 1975)
- Brian Rust: Jazz Records 1897–1942 (5th edition, Chigwell, Essex 1983)
- John Wilby & Laurens Hertzdahl: liner notes for the CD Grey Gull Rarities (Jazz Oracle BDW 8038)
