= Estimé =

Estimé is a surname mainly occurring in Haiti. Notable people with the surname include:

- Audric Estimé (born 2003), American football player
- Dumarsais Estimé (1900–1953), Haitian politician, president of the Haitian Republic (1946–1950)
- Jean-Robert Estimé (1941–2025), Haitian politician
- Rameau Estimé (died 1976), Haitian politician

== See also ==
- Mike Estime, American actor, comedian, writer and director of Haitian descent
- Estimé Records, see Star Recordings, an American independent record label
