= Dan Gregory =

- Origin: Harrisburg, Pennsylvania, U.S.
- Genres: Jazz, orchestra
- Instruments: Piano

Dan Gregory was an American pianist and bandleader, mainly working in Harrisburg, Pennsylvania, from the 1920s through the 1940s. However, his band also appeared in New York City during the early 1920s.

== Career ==
According to Ken Frew, the son of Kenneth "Kenny" Frew (1902–1986), a later member of Gregory's orchestra, the band's New York residence was the Crystal Palace at 66th and Broadway. During its New York years Gregory's band made a handful of records, first for lesser labels such as Oriole, Puritan, Grey Gull and Cameo but also two sides for the major label Victor (Me And The Boy Friend and Then You'll Know That You’re In Love issued on Victor 19519 and 19554 respectively). One of the members of Gregory's orchestra during its New York tenure was multi-instrumentalist Andy Sannella, though it is not known whether he appeared on any of the band's recordings.

Gregory finally (according to Frew) decided to get "rid of his high-priced men" and move back to Harrisburg and organize a new band which went on working through the following two decades. The band also traveled to venues outside its home town and among other places it played at the Bertrand Island amusement park, where it appeared (as "Dan Gregory’s Famous Dance Orchestra") with comedian Clem "Fat" Gority in 1934.

According to Ken Frew, Gregory's outfit toured 29 states and Canada, ports that included Richmond, Chicago, St Louis, Miami, Detroit, Boston, Toronto, New York and Gregory later, apart from leading his own band, "went on to manage Tony Pastor’s Orchestra and helped discover Rosemary Clooney".
