= Ray Miller (bandleader) =

American bandleader

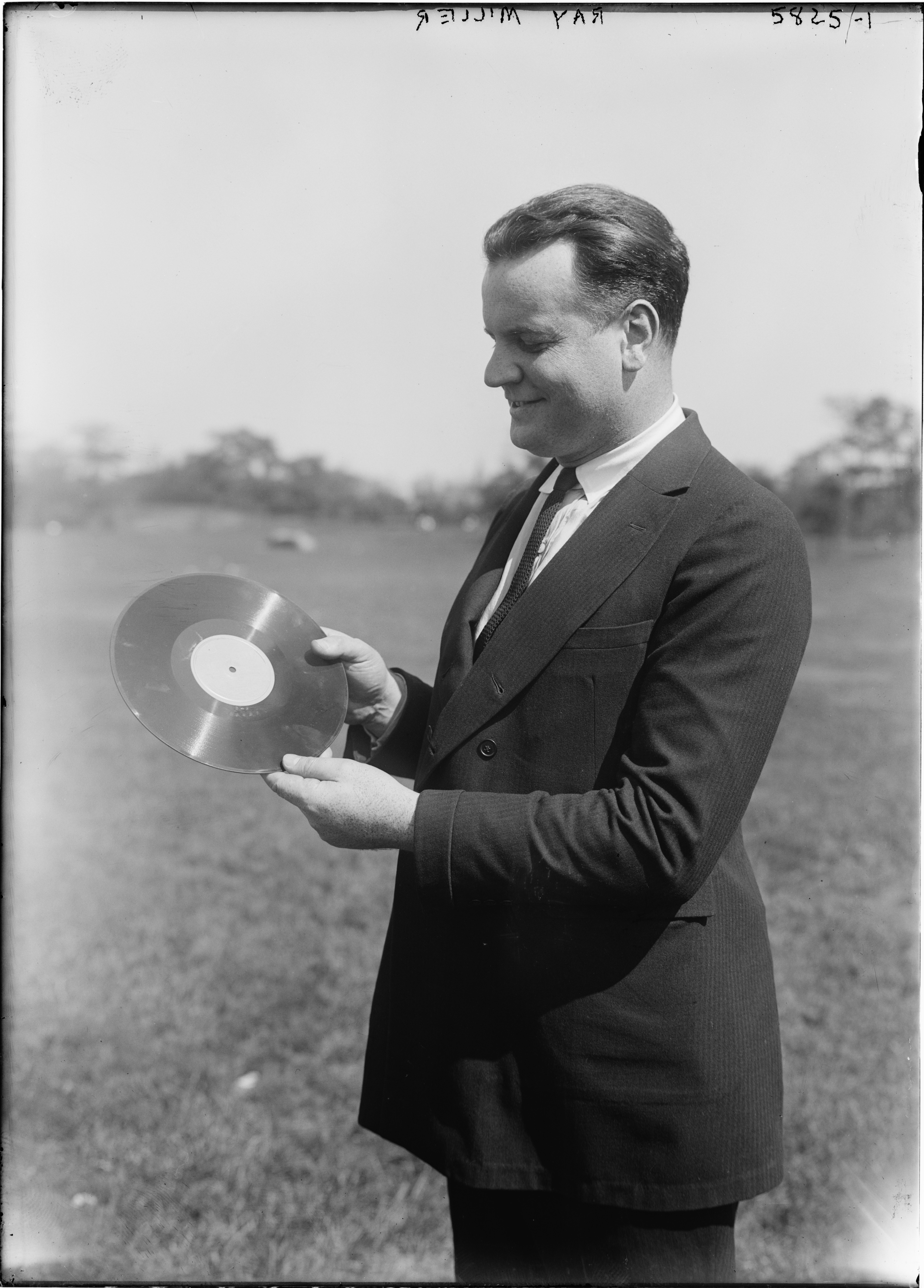
Miller c. 1920–1925

Ray Miller (1896–1974) was an American bandleader who was popular during the 1920s. In 1924 his orchestra performed at the White House with Al Jolson, the first jazz band to do so.

== Biography ==
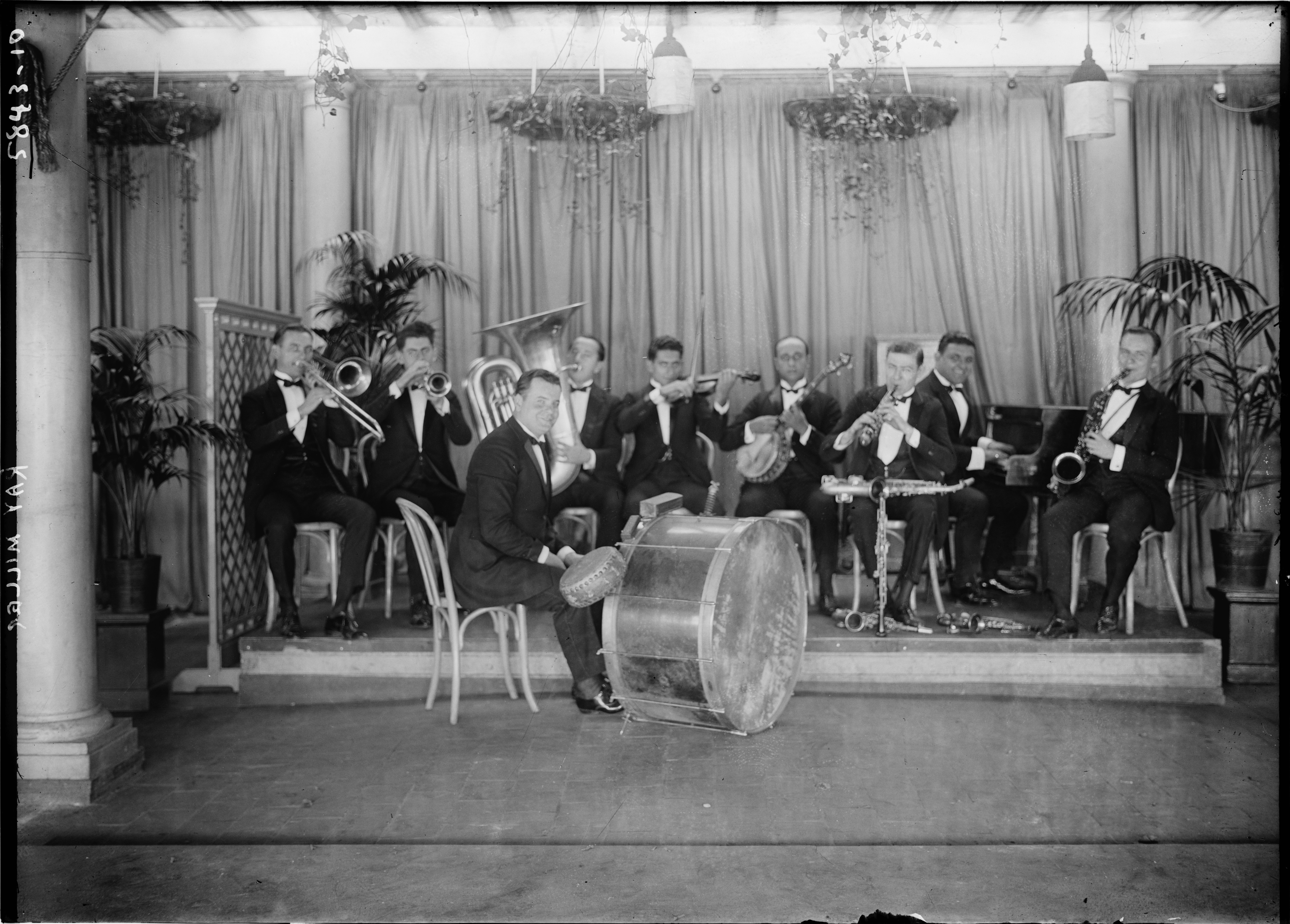
Miller with his band c. 1920–1925

Relatively little is known of Miller's private life. He may have been born in Reading, Pennsylvania. In 1916, he worked as a singing waiter at the Casino Gardens in Chicago, home of the Original Dixieland Jazz Band (ODJB). Miller followed the ODJB to New York City, where he formed a band, the Black and White Melody Boys, featuring himself on drums and New Orleans native Tom Brown on trombone. The band performed in vaudeville and featured in several musical productions before disbanding.

Miller formed a dance band around 1920. Its members, at different times, included Ward Archer (drums); Charlie Rocco (trumpet); Miff Mole (trombone); Danny Yates (violin); Roy Johnston (trumpet); Rube Bloom and Tommy Satterfield (piano); Louie Chasone (tuba); Frank Trumbauer, Andy Sannella, Billy Richards and Andy Sandolar (saxophones); and Frank O. Prima (banjo). The orchestra recorded for various labels, notably Columbia and OKeh, before signing an exclusive contract with Brunswick Records in late 1923. They increasingly played jazz-influenced music — especially after Mole and Trumbauer joined in 1924 — and held residencies at the New York Hippodrome and Arcadia Ballroom, and in Atlantic City. The orchestra's most successful recordings included "The Sheik of Araby" (OKeh, 1922), "I'll See You In My Dreams" (Brunswick, 1925), and "When It's Springtime in the Rockies" (Brunswick, 1930). "I'll See You In My Dreams" was written by Isham Jones, who performed it with the band.

On October 17, 1924, the orchestra became the first jazz band to play at the White House, where they performed with Al Jolson at a campaign rally for President Calvin Coolidge. They also recorded with Jolson, notably on Irving Berlin's song "All Alone" in late 1924. After Mole and Trumbauer left, Miller moved his base to the Hotel Gibson in Cincinnati, Ohio, in 1927, and performed regularly for the powerful radio station WLW. He left Cincinnati and formed a new band in Chicago in 1928, which for a few months included trumpeter Muggsy Spanier and clarinetist Volly De Faut. Miller and his orchestra recorded regularly for Brunswick in Chicago until 1930.

Miller left the music business sometime after 1930. His later life is not publicly recorded, but it has been suggested that Miller invested heavily into the Stock Market before 1929, and lost a good deal of money after the markets crashed in October of that year. He is believed to have died in 1974.
