= Feindflug (Vierte Version) =

1999 Feindflug album

Studio album by Feindflug
- Released: June 1999
- Genre: Industrial metal; power noise; EBM
- Length: 55:07
- Language: German
- Label: Black Rain

Feindflug chronology
| Feindflug (Zweite / Dritte Version) (1997) | Feindflug (Vierte Version) (1999) | Hirnschlacht (2002) |

Feindflug (Vierte Version), also called Feindflug ‘Vierte Version’ or simply Vierte Version, is the first widely released album by German industrial band Feindflug. Although three versions of the album were released earlier, they were limited print runs and not widely distributed. It was released in June 1999 via the label Black Rain.

== Track listing ==
| No. | Title | Length |
|---|---|---|
| 1. | "Intro" | 3:16 |
| 2. | "Feindflug" (Sortie) | 4:12 |
| 3. | "Alptraum" (Nightmare) | 3:35 |
| 4. | "Machtwechsel" (Transfer of Power) | 3:25 |
| 5. | "Leitbild" (Mission Statement) | 4:04 |
| 6. | "Lagerhaft" (Detention in a Prison Camp) | 5:15 |
| 7. | "Grössenwahn" (Megalomania) | 4:44 |
| 8. | "Foltersequenz" (Torture Sequence) | 10:03 |
| 9. | "Stukas Im Visier" (Stukas in Sight) | 5:35 |
| 10. | "Geständnis" (Confession) | 4:06 |
| 11. | "Kahle Bedrohung" (Empty Threat) | 4:28 |
| 12. | "Vergeltung" (Retaliation) | 2:24 |
| Total length: | | 55:07 |

== Themes ==
The author Reinhard Kopanski in his book Bezugnahmen auf den Nationalsozialismus in der populären Musik examined the track Grössenwahn, along with the rest of the album, as a commentary on the rise, motivations, and downfall of Nazi Germany.

== Reception ==
Metal.de stated that Vierte Version is a "almost perfect album" and a "first-class debut album." Rockportaal.nl reviewed the album positively in a retrospective, stating that "Feindflug delivers an energetic album that, despite the dark message, is a pick-me-up for enthusiasts." MetalLibrary.ru gave another positive review, saying that the album can be called a "classic of the genre."
