= Supremacy =

Supremacy may refer to:

== Arts, entertainment, and media ==
=== Gaming ===
- Supremacy (board game), a 1984 strategic board game
- Star Wars Supremacy or Star Wars: Rebellion, a 1998 computer game
- Supremacy: Your Will Be Done or Overlord, a 1990 computer game for Amiga and Atari ST developed by Probe Software
- Supremacy (play-by-mail game)

=== Music ===
- Supremacy (Elegy album), 1994
- Supremacy (Hatebreed album), 2006
- "Supremacy" (song), the 2013 song from the Muse album The 2nd Law

=== Other media ===
- Supremacy (2026 book), a book by Nikolas Bowie and Daphna Renan about the history of the Supreme Court of the United States's judicial supremacy
- Supremacy: AI, ChatGPT and the Race That Will Change the World, a 2024 book by Parmy Olson
- Supremacy (film), a 2014 American film directed by Deon Taylor and written by Eric J. Adams
- Supremacy, a Mega-class Star Destroyer and personal flagship of Supreme Leader Snoke in Star Wars: The Last Jedi

== Law ==
- Supremacy (European Union law), a European Union legal doctrine by which EU law has primacy of that of its member states
- Supremacy Clause of the US Constitution, which establishes that the Constitution, treaties, and federal statutes are the highest law in the US legal system
- Acts of Supremacy, 16th-century English laws concerning King Henry VIII and the church

== Other uses ==
- Supremacism, a philosophy that one is superior to others, or to dominate, control, or rule those who are not
- Supremacy (horse), a racehorse

== See also ==
- Air supremacy, the aerial control of a battlefield by one side's air force
- Petrine supremacy, in the Catholic Church
- Quantum supremacy, the question of whether a quantum computer can solve a problem that classical computers cannot
- Supreme (disambiguation)
