= Mike Mosiello =

Italian-American trumpet player (1896–1953)

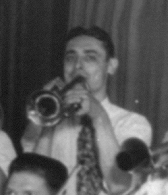

Background information
- Birth name: Michele Alphonso Mosiello
- Born: December 2, 1896
- Origin: Frasso Telesino, Italy
- Died: June 3, 1953 (aged 56)
- Genres: Jazz, popular music
- Instrument: trumpet

Mike Mosiello (full name Michele Alfonso Mosiello) (December 2, 1896 – June 3, 1953) was an Italian-born American trumpet player.

== Biography ==
Michele "Mike" Mosiello was born in Frasso Telesino in Italy into a musical family. His father, Tobia Rocco Mosiello, a tailor, played the clarinet and his godfather was a trumpet player and bandleader. At the age of two, Tobia Rocco and his family migrated to the United States, settling in New York City. Here young Mike took up trumpet playing around the age of six.

During World War I Mike Mosiello enlisted as a military musician in the United States Marine Corps and was stationed in Europe. Back in New York after the war he seriously began a career as a professional musician.

Mosiello played with the orchestras of several famous bandleaders, among them Vincent Lopez. He was however one of the most prolific studio musicians of the 1920s, appearing on hundreds of records, often adding a jazz flavor to many contemporary Tin Pan Alley hits. His most important recordings as a "hot" soloist were probably those made for Victor under the direction of Nathaniel Shilkret, and his countless sides made for the cut-rate Grey Gull company (Grey Gull, Radiex, Van Dyke, Madison, etc.). Mosiello seems to have been something of the leader of the latter company's studio band and recorded several compositions of his own with this group (see below). Among his most frequent co-musicians on these recordings (and on many made for other labels and bandleaders as well) were reedman and guitarist Andy Sannella and accordionist Charles Magnante. Sannella, in an interview shortly before his death, spoke very highly of Mosiello's skills as a musician.

From the 1930s onwards, Mosiello was mainly active in radio and in the pit orchestras of various theatres. During the 1940s he toured with pianist and comedian Victor Borge but also led a band of his own at the "Top Hat" Club in New Jersey.

Since 1922 Mosiello was married to Antoinette Greco, to whom he dedicated his composition Antoinette, I Love You. They had a son and a daughter.

Mike Mosiello died of pancreatic cancer in Asbury Park, New Jersey; he was only 56.

== Compositions ==
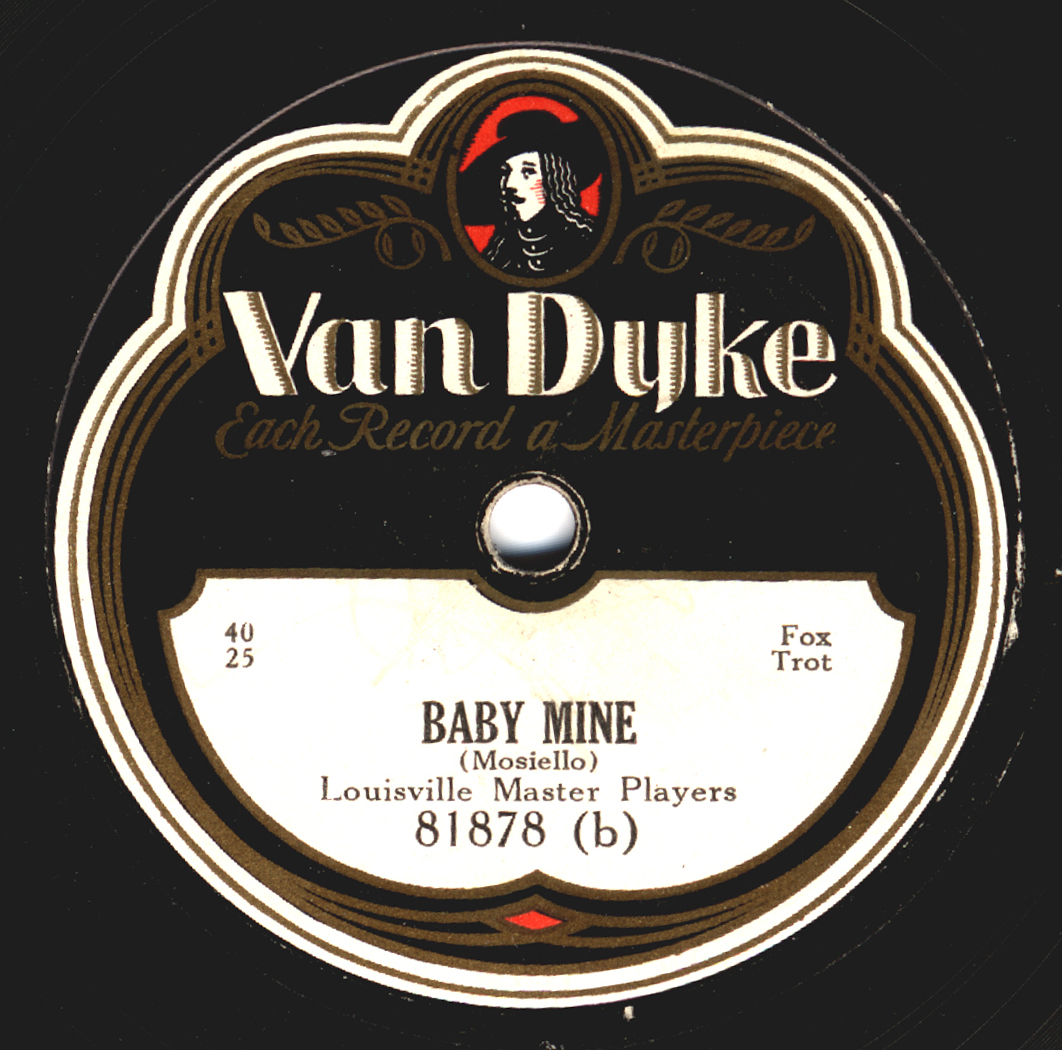
The label of a Van Dyke issue of Mosiello's composition Baby Mine.

Since none of Mosiello's many compositions seem to have been published the only source for these are the credits on the original records issued. Below is a list of known such Mosiello compositions and issues:

- Adeline (Grey Gull 1821)
- Antoinette I Love You (Madison 50023)
- Baby Mine (Grey Gull 1878, Van Dyke 81878)
- Blue Ridge Blues (Grey Gull 1819, Supreme 1819, Van Dyke 81819)
- Blue Waters (Grey Gull 1845, Van Dyke 81845, Madison 5087)
- Come Again (Grey Gull 1780, Van Dyke 71780; also issued as Darlingest)
- Carolina (Madison 6024; possibly also issued as Virginia on Madison 6009)
- Crying For You (Grey Gull 1876)
- Dream Boy (Grey Gull 1847)
- Dreaming Of You (Grey Gull 1785, Van Dyke 71785)
- Hittin' Em Low (Grey Gull 1891)
- Italian Waters (Grey Gull 1750, Van Dyke 71750)
- Just Blues (Grey Gull 1739, Supreme 1739, Radiex 909, Van Dyke 71739, Madison 1649)
- Just Once More (Grey Gull 1783, Van Dyke 71783)
- Just You Honey (Grey Gull 1798; also issued as That Wicked Stomp on Grey Gull 1888 and as Waiting For You on Grey Gull 1890!)
- Linda (Grey Gull 1888)
- Lonesome Me (Madison 5069)
- Love Me Dear (Grey Gull 1877)
- Necking Nellie Home (Madison 50009)
- Step On It (Madison 50009)
- Stomp Along (Grey Gull 1749, Phonycord 563; also issued as Black Stomp)
- Sweetheart It's You (Van Dyke 81891; also issued as Emilia on Grey Gull 1752 and Radiex 1752)
- Sweet Henry (Grey Gull 1822)
- Two Red Lips (Van Dyke 914, Madison 5063; also issued as I Found My Sunshine Under An Umbrella on Madison 50011)
- Wow Wow Blues (Grey Gull 1751, Van Dyke 901, 5001 & 71751, Madison 5001, 50001 & 1935, Goodson 156; on some issues renamed Ja Da Blues)
- You Ought To See Her Now (Grey Gull 1779, Van Dyke 71779)

A few of these records have been reissued on the CD Grey Gull Rarities from Jazz Oracle .

== Sources ==
This article is based on the corresponding article in the Swedish Wikipedia.
