= Feindflug =

German industrial band

Feindflug.
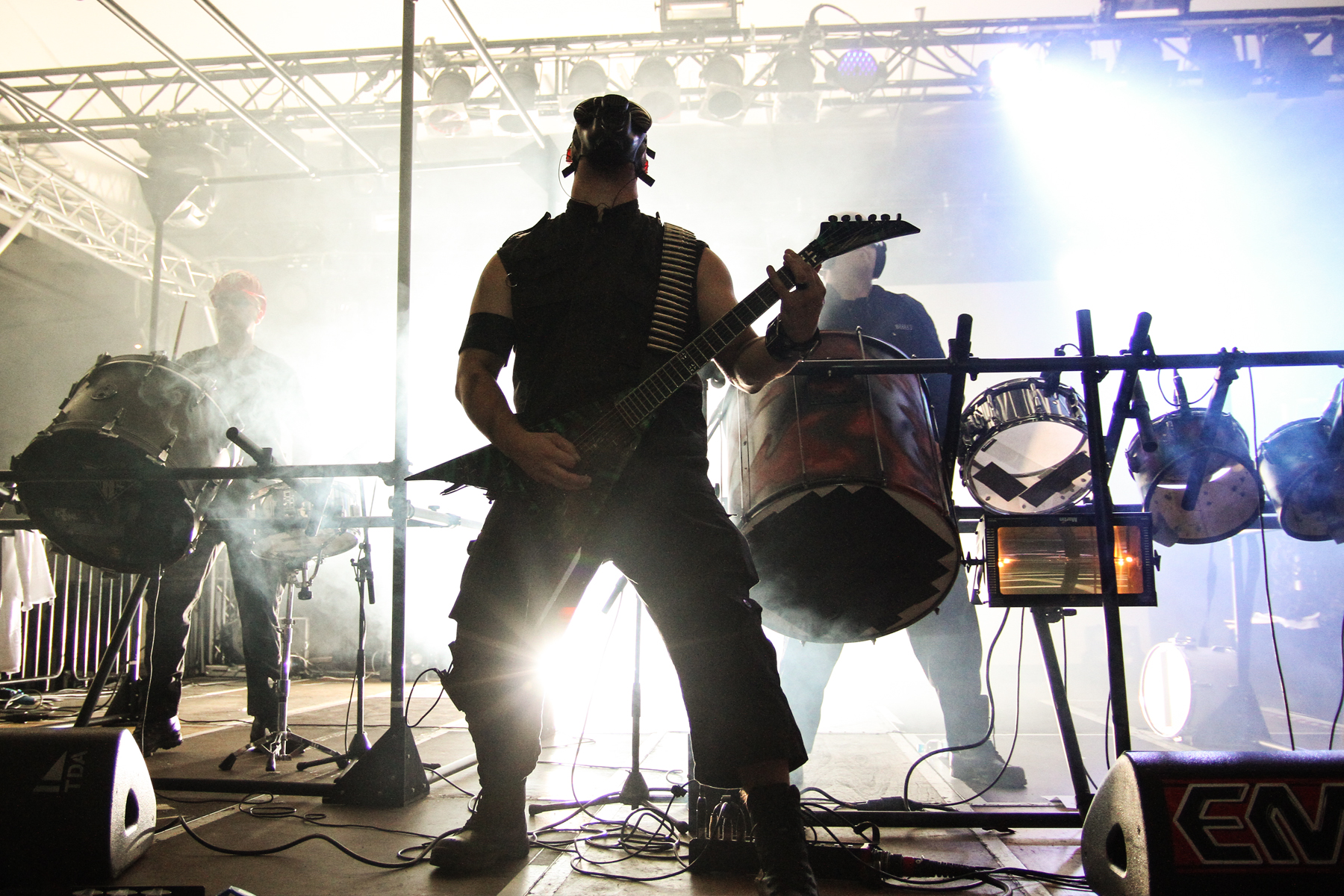
- Feindflug at Amphi Festival in 2011

Background information
- Origin: Chemnitz, Germany
- Genres: Aggrotech; Electro-industrial; Power noise
- Years active: 1995–present
- Labels: Black Rain Records
- Members: DJ Felix (production); DJ Banane (production); Zero Kelvin (e-guitar); Matze (percussion); Jan (percussion); Soli (percussion)
- Past members: Beam (live-percussion); Clemens (live-percussion); Kay (keyboard)

Feindflug is a German electro-industrial band founded in 1995 by DJ Felix and DJ Banane. Translated, der Feindflug (literally "the foe-flight") corresponds in military use to the French/English word "sortie."

== Style and themes ==
Feindflug's music is entirely instrumental. The only vocals that can be heard are in samples, mostly taken from movies dubbed in German or excerpts of Adolf Hitler or Klaus Kinski.

The band is characterized by Jeffrey Andrew Weinstock and Isabella van Elferen as martial industrial and neo-folk, "negotiating the role of the past in the present." Recurring themes and topics are authoritarian regimes, the death-penalty and total war, especially World War II and the Third Reich.

Critics have associated the band with the German Neo-Nazi scene, due to the themes presented in their music and their album cover graphics. The band-members oppose this critique and have stated that their music is intended as a reflection of the issues it describes, not as support. The band's motto is "Use your brain and think about it!" Feindflug has stated that "any form of glorification/trivialization of the Second World War contradicts the intention of this project. Rather, it aims to make it clear that this era of history represents the beginning of a new technological warfare, in which the individual became/becomes the victim millions of times over" and that their goal is to "try to crush the taboo in Germany, since the war is a great part of the German history."

== Career highlights ==
In 1999, the band had their first official performance at the 8th Wave-Gotik-Treffen music festival in Leipzig, Germany.

In 2004, the band was invited to perform at the 13th Wave-Gotik-Treffen music festival in Leipzig, Germany.

In 2006, the band performed at the 15th Wave-Gotik-Treffen music festival in Leipzig, Germany.

In 2009, the band performed at the 5th edition of the Amphi Festival in Köln, Germany.

In 2010, the band performed at the E-tropolis music festival in Berlin, Germany.

In 2011, the band performed at the 20th edition of Wave-Gotik-Treffen in Leipzig, Germany, and at the 7th edition of the Amphi Festival in Köln, Germany.

== Discography ==
=== Albums ===
- Feindflug ("First version", CD-R, 1997), limited private release
- Feindflug (Zweite / Dritte Version) ("Second / Third version", CD-R, 1997), limited private re-release of above
- Feindflug (Vierte Version) ("Fourth version", CD, 1999), re-release of above
- Hirnschlacht (CD, 2002)
- Volk und Armee (CD, 2005)
- Feindflug (Dritte Version) ("Third version", 2009), limited picture vinyl re-release

=== Singles and EPs ===
- I. / St. G. 3 (MCD, 1998)
- Im Visier (MCD, 1999)
- Sterbehilfe (EP, 2000)
- I. / St. G. 3 (Phase 2) (MCD, 2003, rerelease of 1998 version with 1 extra track)
- Kollaboration (Vinyl, 2004, only available on tour)

=== Video ===
- ...hinter feindlichen Linien (DVD, Boxset version available) (2006)

=== Collaborative releases ===
- We'll F*** You Up!; Supreme Court feat. Feindflug (2006)

Feindflug's first official release, I. / St. G. 3, was released on the radical right-wing VAWS label. They say that they regret this, and didn't know what VAWS was about, but that no one else was willing to release their work due to the controversial name, imagery, and use of samples.

All subsequent releases have been made on the Black Rain label, but not without trouble. The Dutch producer for the Sterbehilfe EP refused production because of explicit images of an execution with an electrical chair, and the Austrian producer for Hirnschlacht refused production later because of the national-socialist accusations.

== See also ==
- List of electro-industrial bands
