= Supremo =

Supremo may refer to:

- Supremo (album), 2011, by Chino y Nacho
- Supremo (comics), a 1980s character based on Indian movie star Amitabh Bachchan
- Supremo (film), 2012, Filipino, about Andrés Bonifacio
- * Teamo Supremo, an animated TV series
- Supremo, equipment in the game Far Cry 6

== See also ==
- El Supremo (disambiguation)
- Supreme (disambiguation)
- Suprema (disambiguation)
