= Westwind (band) =

- Origin: France
- Genres: Neoclassical; Martial Industrial; Post-industrial
- Years active: 1999–present
- Labels: Steelwork Maschine
- Members: Kris G.
- Website: Westwind

Westwind is a musical project from the French post-industrial scene, created by Kris G. (pseudonym of Christophe Gales). It mixes influences from musics such as Martial industrial, Post-industrial, Dark ambient, Neofolk and Neoclassical music.

Westwind started in 1999 by releasing self-produced and handmade CD-R's on its own label Black Sun Rising, which was dissolved in 2002. In 2003 Kris G. created the new label Steelwork Maschine together with Serge Usson of the bands Neon Rain and Storm Of Capricorn.

== Discography ==
=== Albums ===
- Ravage (2010)
- Tourmente II (2004)
- Tourmente I (2004)
- Le Vent Divin (2003)
- The Bunker (2002)
- Der Angriff (2000)
- Harvests of Steel (1999)
- Everyone can be... (1999)

=== Compilations ===
- ...Where Tattered Clouds Are Stranding (The Eastern Front 2008)
- 63 Days (Fluttering Dragon 2006)
- Letters From The Front (The Eastern Front 2005)
- Songs From The Bunker (Bunkier Productions 2004)
- Ombres Et Lumières (Divine Comedy 2003)
- Apocalyptic Prods Vol 1 (Apocalyptic Productions 2003)
- Geliebt Verfolgt Und Unvergessen (VAWS 2002)
- Security of Ignorance (Thaglasz 2002)
- Nowhere Radicalism (Neon Rain & Partners in Crime / Black Sun Rising 2002)
- Sol Lucet Omnibus (Cynfeirdd 2001)
- Der Waldganger (Thaglasz 2001)
- Notre Domicile Est L'Europe (Thaglasz 2001)
- Blockhaus Music (Black Sun Rising 2000)
- Trois Chandelles (Cynfeirdd 1999)
