= Mark Tucker (musician) =

American musician

Mark Tucker (born October 11, 1957, in Laurel, Maryland, United States, is an American musician, songwriter, singer, producer, and co-founder of Tetrapod Spools.

His debut album, Batstew, which is now collectible, was released in two runs, each of 100 copies. The album was re-released in 1996 as a compact disc, with extra tracks that never made it onto the original LP. It comprises amongst other things recordings of Tucker's car, a 1964 Cadillac which he had nicknamed "The Bat".

In 1982, Tucker recorded his second album, In The Sack. The music was largely experimental, with tracks including "Everywhere with Sally (Ride)", a pop song recorded backwards. In 1991, he legally changed his name to T. Storm Hunter and continued to release music under that name.

== Discography ==
=== Albums ===
- Batstew — 1975
  1. This Hearse
  2. Prologue: 1964 Cadillac
  3. 64Z037375 Part 1
  4. Before They Call, I Will Answer
  5. Sideways Love Forever
  6. 64Z037375 Part 2
  7. Honey Tree
  8. The Way It Really Is
  9. Bataszew
  10. I'm Nothing
  11. Submerged Bat Vortex
  12. All Cars Are Sisters
  13. 1964 Cadillac
  14. Kids
  15. Bataszew (Alternate Version 2)
  16. This Beach Is Very
  17. Kotzebue
- In The Sack — 1983
- Harem-Scarem Suite — 1996
  1. EVA: The Bat
  2. KITCHY: The Lady From Nod
  3. AGNES: Seldom Siren Of Delusion
  4. SANDY: Since Night You Loved Me; Yet Since Night You Left Me
  5. COTTON: Disappearing Candy
  6. SHELLEY: Once Beneath The Bridge
  7. SALLY: Holdin' Sally In The Alley
  8. ELLEN: Someone To Love Me
  9. DAISY: Laundry Dog
  10. DAPHNE: The Laurel Tree Of Apollo
