= Volk und Armee =

Studio album by Feindflug
- Released: 24 October 2005
- Genre: Industrial metal; power noise; EBM
- Length: 68:11
- Language: German
- Label: Black Rain

Feindflug chronology
Hirnschlacht (2002)	Volk und Armee (2005)	Feindflug 'Dritte Version' (2009)

Volk und Armee (People and Army), also called Volk und Armee..., is the third album by German industrial band Feindflug. The album was released on 24 October 2005 via the label Black Rain. The album is instrumental except for vocal samples used in the tracks.

== Track listing ==
No.	Title	Length
1.	"Einmarsch" (Invasion)	3:26
2.	"Standgericht" (Field Court Martial)	5:59
3.	"AK 47"	7:13
4.	"Truppenschau" (Troop Inspection)	5:38
5.	"Feuerpause" (Ceasefire)	1:44
6.	"Schmerzgrenze" (Pain Threshold)	5:24
7.	"Tauchfahrt" (Diving Trip)	7:02
8.	"Feindbild" (Concept of the Enemy)	3:33
9.	"Sperrfeuer" (Barrage)	5:16
10.	"Leere Gräben" (Empty Trenches)	1:47
11.	"Ätherkrieg" (War of the Airwaves)	4:30
12.	"Gulag"	5:35
13.	"Neue Sieger" (New Victors)	6:55
14.	"TSFKS" (featuring Bluthund)	4:09
Total length:		68:11

== Themes ==
Volk und Armee has been examined by reviewers for its imagery and samples that contain references to communism and nazism. The booklet contains a series of Soviet, American, and Spanish propaganda posters from WWII. The album cover takes inspiration from the poster "Народ и Армия непобедимы" ("People and Army are invincible") by the Soviet graphic artist Viktor Koretsky. The tracks Feindbild and Ätherkrieg also contain samples of speeches from Adolf Hitler. Feindflug stated in the liner notes for the album at the last page that "any form of glorification/trivialization of the Second World War contradicts the intention of this project. Rather, it aims to make it clear that this era of history represents the beginning of a new technological warfare, in which the individual became/becomes the victim millions of times over. New connections between the topic and current events emerge every day... " The band has also stated that their goal is to "try to crush the taboo in Germany, since the war is a great part of the German history."

== Reception ==
Professional ratings
Review scores
Source	Rating
Chain D.L.K.	4/5 stars
Brutal Resonance	8/10 stars

Ver Sacrum gave the album a positive review, stating that Volk und Armee is a respectable album, absolutely "in the Feindflug style,"' and that it is "another contender for the title of best album of 2005." Brutal Resonance gave another positive review, calling it the "strongest release [by Feindflug] so far." Chain D.L.K. commented on the style of the album, noting that "musically the tracks are built around a core of industrial e.b.m./techno [sic] where simple melodic lines (played mostly by synth strings) are overwhelmed by distorted and saturated drums." Terrorverlag said that the album's "overall maturity level is consistently high, which is certainly not the norm for such a long CD."
