= Johnny Marvin =

American musician (1897–1944)

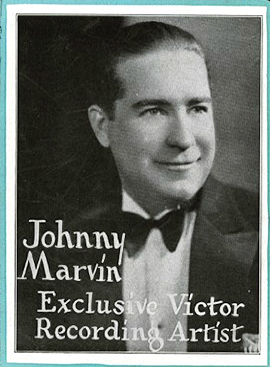

Background information
- Born: John Senator Marvin; July 1, 1897; Butler, Oklahoma Territory
- Died: December 10, 1944 (aged 47) North Hollywood, California
- Genres: Jazz, country, Hawaiian
- Occupations: Singer, Musician
- Instrument: Ukulele
- Years active: 1924–1944
- Labels: Victor, Radiex, Harmony

John Senator Marvin (July 11, 1897 – December 10, 1944) was an early American recording artist and musician, starting in 1924 and covering a twenty-year period for many record labels.

== Early years ==
Born in Butler, Oklahoma Territory, in 1897, Marvin ran away from home at the age of 16. He served in the US Navy during World War I. After returning home, he went on the road as a vaudeville performer.

His first solo ukulele recording, "You know Me Alabam'", was in 1924 on the Radiex label under the name Johnny Marvin. He was an early adapter of the Martin Tiple style ukulele. It is probable that he was introduced to the new instrument due to a factory visit to the Martin factory in 1922. He was unsuccessful in obtaining an endorsement deal with Martin, who limited their support to a 20% discount for all performers.

== Pseudonyms ==
Marvin recorded 49 records for Victor Records from 1926 to 1930. His contract with Victor was not an exclusive one; he did performances and recordings under a large number of names with a variety of labels: Elton Spence and His Ukulele, Ukulele Luke, Jack Lane and His Uke, George Thorne, Billy Hancock, Honey Duke and His Uke - Harmony Label, Jimmy May and His Uke, and Ken Wallace.

Harmony Musical Instruments Company of Chicago produced the Johnny Marvin Professional Tenor Ukulele as well as "The Prince of Wales" made of traditional koa wood. He presented a copy to the Prince of Wales on one of his trips to England. His endorsement of the Harmony company was a result of being unable to work out a deal with C. F. Martin & Company.

== Relationships ==
Marvin's younger brother, Frankie, was also in the industry. Marvin introduced Frankie to Gene Autry, another musician, and the two roomed together in New York City. In 1930, Marvin introduced Autry to his friend Art Satherley of the American Record Corporation, a move which launched Autry's career.

Autry returned the favor when his career took off, bringing Frankie and Johnny into motion pictures and radio to help with the music. The two brothers, though uncredited, were often seen in Western movies. Johnny Marvin was inducted into the Ukulele Hall of Fame in 2003. His citation reads in part, "In the decade when the ukulele was enjoying its greatest popularity, Marvin was one of the premiere ukulele performers."

== Hollywood ==
Marvin worked with Gene Autry in Hollywood. He is credited with providing songs for soundtracks on over 50 movies and television shows. During World War II, he joined the USO to entertain the troops. Although he contracted dengue fever, his Christian Science beliefs prevented him from receiving treatment, and he returned home where he died on December 20, 1944.
