= Joseph Samuels =

American musician

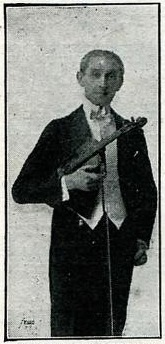
Joseph Samuels as pictured in the May 1919 edition of The Tatler.

Joseph Samuels was an American musician and bandleader, who is today virtually only known through his recordings.

== The mysterious Joseph Samuels ==
Practically nothing seems to be known about Joseph Samuels as a person, and the dates of his birth and death have long remained unknown to jazz historians. An article published in the May 1919 issue of The Tatler indicates he was born in Tennessee, studied under Campanari at the College of Music of Cincinnati, and was concert master for Henry W. Savage. His name indicates that he, as well as many other musicians of the New York City scene at the time, may have been of Jewish origin. He was mainly a reed player (playing clarinet, alto saxophone, and bass saxophone), but also played violin and made records as a soloist on the latter instrument accompanied by pianist Frank Banta.

== Recording career ==
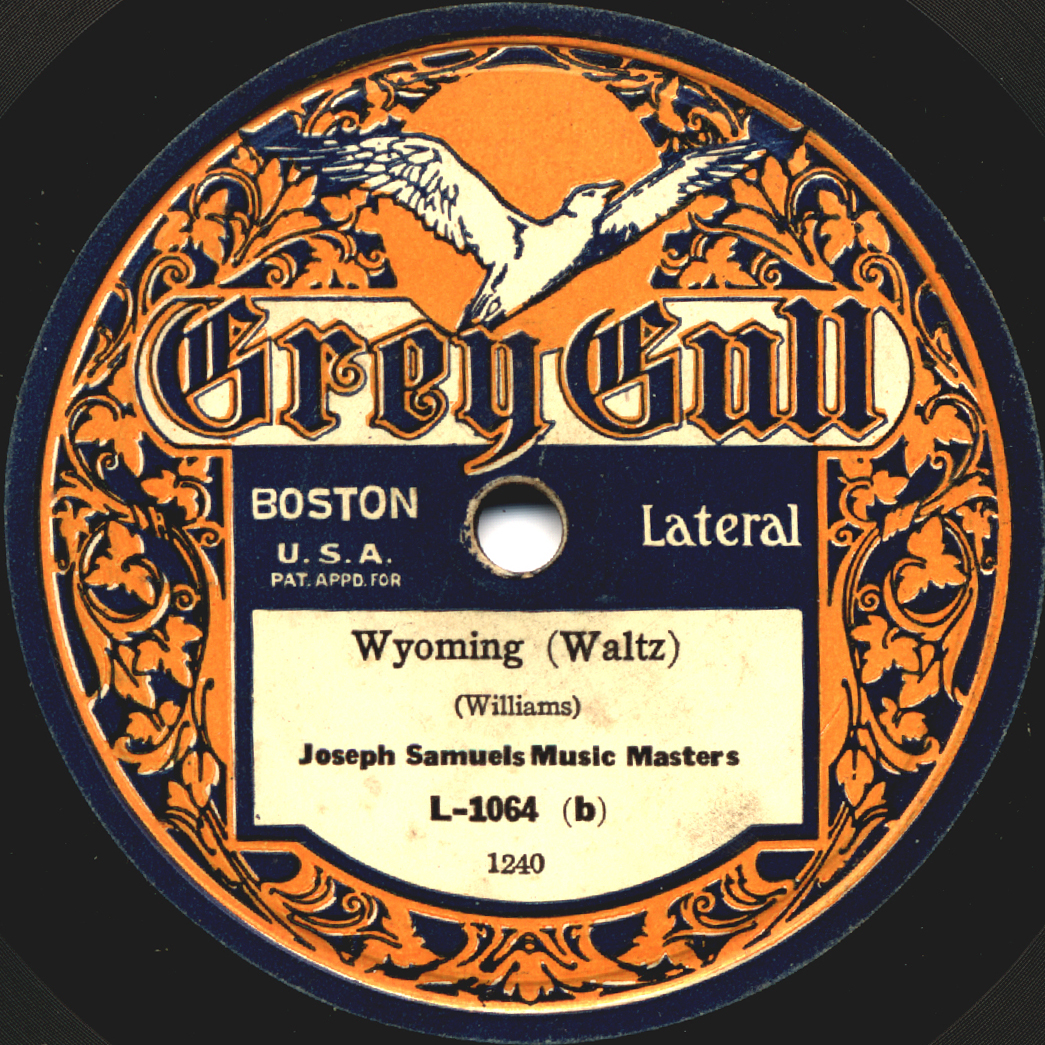
1921 Grey Gull record label of a recording by "Joseph Samuels Music Masters".

What is known beyond doubt about Samuels is that he was an extremely prolific musician during the years 1919 to 1925, at least on records. In his work The American Dance Band Discography 1917-1942 noted discographer Brian Rust devotes 19 pages to the nearly 400 recordings made by Samuels and his dance orchestra.

Samuels' recording debut seems to have been with Pathé in January 1919. After this he went on to record for several other companies, beginning with Emerson, Grey Gull, and Arto in 1920, continuing with Edison in 1921 and with Gennett, Federal, and Banner in 1922.

From 1923 onwards, the last of these labels - as well as associated labels such as Regal, Oriole and Domino - became the dominating recipient of Samuels' services. As usually on these low-budget labels, the recordings were issued under an array of bewildering pseudonyms such as "Majestic Dance Orchestra", "Hollywood Dance Orchestra" and "Missouri Jazz Band".

Apart from these hundreds of peppy dance music recordings, Samuels also lead smaller recording groups playing in a more outright jazz idiom. Most of these latter sides were made under the names of Synco Jazz Band (49 recordings during 1919–1922, mainly for Pathé but also for Columbia and Grey Gull), Joseph Samuels' Jazz Band (40 recordings during 1920–23, mainly for Okeh but also for Paramount) and Tampa Blue Jazz Band (31 recordings for Okeh during 1921–1923). To these might be added some further seven sides waxed for Columbia in 1924 as Columbia Novelty Orchestra. The earliest of these small band recordings were very much in the style of the Original Dixieland Jazz Band, but over time got a sound and style of their own. The band's recording for Okeh of The Fives in March 1923 is considered the first orchestral recording of boogie-woogie.

In particular, for Okeh, these small jazz-oriented Samuels groups also accompanied several black singers, male as well as female ones, including names such as Lucille Hegamin, Mamie Smith and Clarence Williams. These accompaniments are among the earliest examples of racially mixed jazz recordings in the United States.

== Fellow musicians ==
For his dance band as well as his jazz group recordings, Samuels seems to have relied mainly on the same nucleus of fellow musicians, many of them nearly as little known as their leader.

On trumpet Samuels generally had Jules Levy Jr. (1889-1924). He was the son of a British-born cornet virtuoso of the same name. Like his father, Levy Jr. also performed and recorded as a soloist in concert and military style. He is reported to later have led a band of his own in Hollywood. When a second trumpet appears in Samuel's recordings it is generally Hymie Farberman.

On trombone was Ephraim Hannaford, who had earlier been a member of the religious community called "House of David" and had worked in the various well-known musical aggregations within that group.

On piano Samuels had Laurie T. "Larry" Briers (born 1891), of whom extremely little is known. He is however credited as co-composer on at least one of the tunes recorded by Samuels and also published other songs both during and after the recording career of the Samuels bands ended. His best known work is probably Brother Low Down, written with singer Al Bernard and recorded by Bert Williams among others.

At least Levy, Farberman and Hannaford also took part in recordings with other well-known bandleaders of the 1920s such as Sam Lanin, Ben Selvin, Arthur Lange, Harry Reser and Fred Rich. Samuels himself on the other hand seems to have recorded for no other leader than himself.

== Sources ==
- Brian Rust: The American Dance Band Discography 1917-1942 (New Rochelle, New York 1975)
- Brian Rust: Jazz Records 1897-1942 (5th edition, Chigwell, Essex 1983)
