= Hirnschlacht =

Studio album by Feindflug
- Released: 3 June 2002
- Genre: Industrial metal; power noise; EBM
- Length: 63:26
- Language: German
- Label: Black Rain

Feindflug chronology
Feindflug (Vierte Version) (1999)	Hirnschlacht (2002)	Volk und Armee (2005)

Hirnschlacht ("Brain-Battle") is the second album by German industrial band Feindflug. It was released on 3 June 2002 via the label Black Rain. The album is instrumental except for vocal samples used in the tracks.

== Track listing ==
No.	Title	Length
1.	"Glaubenskrieg" ("Crusade", literally "Faith-War")	6:37
2.	"Suchatzki Marsch"	5:34
3.	"Selbstsucht" ("Selfishness", literally "Self-Greed")	4:44
4.	"Blutorgel" ("Blood-Organ")	5:22
5.	"Kalte Unschuld" ("Cold Innocence")	5:01
6.	"Menschenjagd" ("Manhunt")	4:42
7.	"Sturmwalzer" ("Storm-Waltz")	4:08
8.	"Faustrecht" ("Rule of Force", literally "Right of the Fist")	4:59
9.	"Kopfschuss" ("Headshot")	7:17
10.	"Roter Schnee" ("Red Snow", includes a video)	15:02
Total length:		63:26

== Reception ==
Professional ratings
Review scores
Source	Rating
AllMusic	3/5 stars
Metal.de	8/10 stars

Metal.de rated the album highly, stating that it was a good successor to the previous album Vierte Version, although noting that the samples used were less aggressive. AllMusic said that "they [Feindflug] do one dark thing and they do it extremely well." Chain D.L.K. gave a positive review, though stating the video accompanying Roter Schnee was "really not that great." IndustrialReviews.ru and DarkItalia.com also gave positive reviews, both noting the unique style of music.

Katja Kauer stated in the book Pop und Männlichkeit that the title of the album suggests that the portrayal of mental knowledge can coexist with the displays of physical masculinity usually seen in industrial music.
