= El Supremo =

El Supremo or il Supremo ("the supreme one" in Spanish and Italian respectively) may refer to:

- José Gaspar Rodríguez de Francia (1766–1840), Paraguayan dictator
- Pasquale Condello (born 1950), leader of the Italian 'Ndrangheta crime organization
- El Supremo (wrestler) (1942–2010), ring name of Mexican professional wrestler Salvador Cuevas Ramírez
- El Supremo, a fictional character in the Horatio Hornblower novel The Happy Return (1937)

== See also ==
- Supremo (disambiguation)
