= Jules Levy (musician) =

British musician (1838–1803)

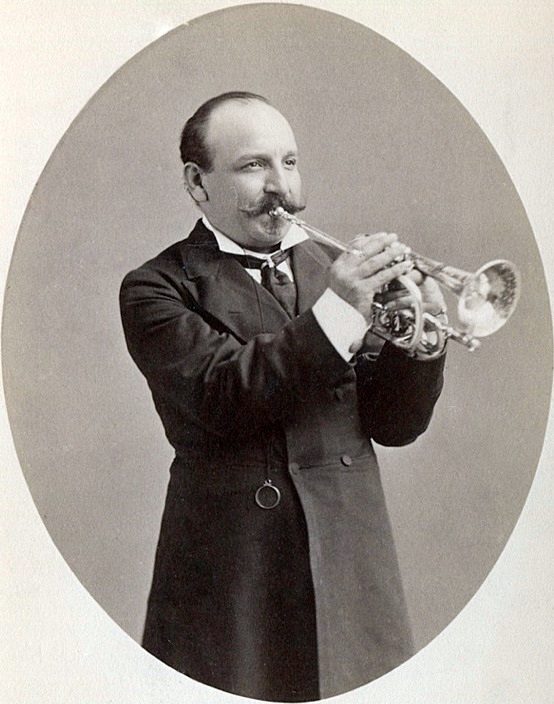
Jules Levy

Jules Levy (April 24, 1838 – November 28, 1903) was a cornetist, teacher and composer.

== Biography ==
Born in London, England, he reportedly began his study of the cornet with only its mouthpiece. This was due to his family's inability to afford the instrument itself.

After migrating to the United States, he began a significant musical career as a cornet soloist, eventually billed as "The World's Greatest Cornetist", although the claim has some challengers. He was widely regarded as a foremost player. He was a member of Patrick Gilmore's band for several years, performing with them at the Centennial Exposition in Philadelphia in 1876. He was also a tester and promoter for C.G. Conn, a manufacturer of musical instruments.

Levy performed many pieces, among the most famous being "Una Voce" by Rossini, "Carnival of Venice," "Grand Russian Fantasia," and "Whirlwind Polka". He was arguably the first cornetist to be recorded, having participated in an early public demonstration of Thomas Edison's tinfoil phonograph. He later recorded commercially for Victor Records and Columbia Records.

Jules Levy died at age 65 in Chicago, Illinois.

== Family ==
Levy married actress Marianne "Minnie" Jane Conway on August 15, 1875. Their only son, Frederick Conway (Levy) Tearle, was a popular stage and screen actor.

The couple separated due to Levy's hidden bigamous marriage. His first wife is still unknown.

His next wife, music teacher and soprano singer Stella Corbett Levy (born June 1863), married Levy in 1885. His first child was Louise M. Levy (born 1885). She was a violinist, later transitioning to an actress.

His second child, Jules Adolph Gabriel Levy Jr. (January 8, 1889 – June 18, 1924), followed his father, becoming an accomplished cornetist and trumpeter. He often performed in groups led by Joseph Samuels.

His last child was Juliette Rose Marie Levy (born 1895). Her life and occupation was unknown.
