= I'll See You in My Dreams (1924 song) =

1924 song by Gus Kahn and Isham Jones

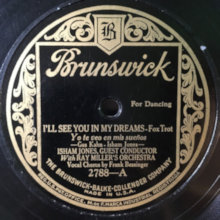

Single by Isham Jones, Guest Conductor with Ray Miller's Orchestra, Vocal Chorus by Frank Bessinger
- B-side: "Why Couldn't It Be Poor Little Me"
- Published: December 19, 1924 by Leo Feist, Inc.
- Released: February 1925
- Recorded: December 4, 1924
- Studio: Brunswick Studios, 799 Seventh Avenue, New York City
- Genre: American Dance Music
- Length: 2:59
- Label: Brunswick 2788
- Composer: Isham Jones
- Lyricist: Gus Kahn

Isham Jones Orchestra singles chronology
"Some Other Day, Some Other Girl" (1924)	"I'll See You in My Dreams" (1925)	"Riverboat Shuffle" (1925)

Audio sample
- Recording of I'll See You In My Dreams, performed by Isham Jones & Ray Miller's Orchestra with vocal chorus by Frank Bessinger (1924): file; help

"I'll See You in My Dreams"

Single by Pat Boone

from the album I'll See You in My Dreams
- B-side: "Pictures in the Fire"
- Released: January 1962
- Genre: Pop
- Label: Dot
- Songwriters: Isham Jones, Gus Kahn

I'll See You In My Dreams by J.Grandgagnage on tenor sax

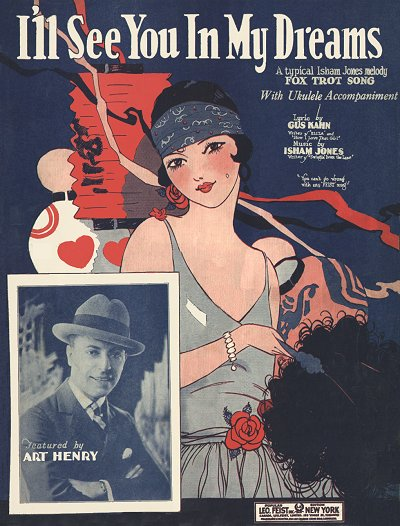
Sheet music cover, 1924

"I'll See You in My Dreams" is a popular song and jazz standard, composed by Isham Jones, with lyrics by Gus Kahn, and published in 1924. It was recorded on December 4 that year, by Jones conducting Ray Miller's Orchestra on Brunswick Records. Other popular versions in 1925 were by Marion Harris; Paul Whiteman; Ford & Glenn; and Lewis James.

The song was sung by Jeanne Crain in Margie (1946) and was chosen as the title song of the 1951 film I'll See You in My Dreams, a musical biography of Kahn.

Popular recordings of it were made by many leading artists, including Cliff Edwards, Louis Armstrong, Bing Crosby (recorded November 27, 1947), Doris Day, Ella Fitzgerald, Mario Lanza, Tony Martin, the Platters, Ezio Pinza, Sue Raney, Jerry Lee Lewis (1958, instrumental), Andy Williams, and Linda Scott. A "Texas Swing" version of the song was recorded by Bob Wills and his Texas Playboys.

The song was also recorded by Django Reinhardt and the Quintet of the Hot Club of France, and inspired Merle Travis to record it as a guitar instrumental. Many other guitarists, including Chet Atkins and Thom Bresh, followed in Travis's footsteps. Michel Lelong, a French guitarist, published the first tablature of Travis's arrangement for the American publisher/guitarist Stefan Grossman's Guitar Workshop during the 1980s, following by Thom Bresh (Merle Travis's son) for Homespun Tapes, and Marcel Dadi for Stefan Grossman's Guitar Workshop.

It was recorded by Mario Lanza on his Coca-Cola Show of 1951–1952 and is available on a compilation album mastered from those same shows, and featuring the same title, I'll See You in My Dreams, released by BMG in 1998.

== Pat Boone version ==
The most recent version of "I'll See You in My Dreams" to become a chart hit was by Pat Boone, and was the title track of his 1962 LP. The single peaked at number 32 on the Billboard Hot 100 and number nine on the Adult Contemporary chart. It also became a hit in the United Kingdom, where it reached number 27 on the UK Singles Chart.

The record's B-side, "Pictures in the Fire," charted concurrently with "I'll See You in My Dreams," reaching number 77 on the U.S. Billboard Hot 100, number 63 on Cash Box, and number 15 on the Adult Contemporary chart.

=== Chart history ===
Chart (1962)	Peak position
UK Singles Chart (The Official Charts Company)	27
US Billboard Hot 100	32
US Billboard Easy Listening	9
US Cash Box Top 100	35

== Other cover versions ==
- An early version was recorded by Hawaiian steel guitar originator Joseph Kekuku in 1925.
- A 1953/54 version by Eddie Cochran was released in 1997 on the album Rockin' It Country Style.
- In 1955, Anita O'Day included the song on her This Is Anita album.
- In 1963, The Bachelors recorded their version of the song, and this appeared on their first EP, The Bachelors.
- In 1976, Ron Goodwin and His Orchestra included the song on their album Rhythm and Romance.
- In 1976, British female vocal duo The Pearls released a disco version of the song, which was pressed in the US on a 10" promo disc as well as the regular 7-inch single.
- In 1978, Foster Sylvers did a version on his second album
- In 1987, Mark Knopfler and Chet Atkins performed it live as a medley with John Lennon's "Imagine".
- In 1999, guitarist Howard Alden recorded an instrumental version of this song for the soundtrack of the movie Sweet and Lowdown.
- In 2002, Joe Brown performed a version of the song on the ukulele as the finale of the George Harrison tribute concert Concert for George.
- In 2003, the Portuguese metal band Moonspell recorded a version that would serve as soundtrack for the short horror movie I'll See You in My Dreams, of which was also recorded a music video.
- In 2004, Dan Hicks & The Hot Licks recorded a version on the album Selected Shorts.
- In 2005, American singer-songwriter Ingrid Michaelson recorded a cover of the song for her debut album Slow the Rain.
- In 2010, Australian singer Melinda Schneider recorded the song for her Doris Day tribute album Melinda Does Doris.
- In 2012, Tiffany Schellenberg recorded the song for the film A Fantastic Fear of Everything, starring Simon Pegg.
- In 2013, The National front man Matt Berninger recorded the song with Vince Giordano and the Nighthawks Orchestra for the third volume of the Boardwalk Empire soundtrack.
- Canadian jazz pianist and singer Diana Krall included the song on her 2017 studio album Turn Up the Quiet.
- In 2021, country/novelty singer Ray Stevens recorded the song on his studio album Slow Dance.

== Film appearances ==
- 1931 - Tallulah Bankhead sings two lines of it in The Cheat
- 1939 – Alice Faye sang it in Rose of Washington Square.
- 1940 – The song was on the soundtrack for the film Kitty Foyle, which won Ginger Rogers her only Academy Award for Best Actress in a Leading Role. Played on the radio at the speakeasy and reprised by the band at the nightclub. It is also danced to by Ginger Rogers and Dennis Morgan.
- 1944 – Follow the Boys – performed by Jeanette MacDonald.
- 1946 – Margie – sung by Jeanne Crain (dubbed by Louanne Hogan)
- 1946 – An instrumental version of the song, arranged by Herbert Spencer, was featured prominently in The Razor's Edge. An instrumental version opens the Tom and Jerry cartoon The Milky Waif.
- 1951 – I'll See You in My Dreams – sung by a chorus during the opening and closing credits, also by Doris Day, and it is played at the surprise party
- 1975 – Hearts of the West
