= To the Fallen Records =

To The Fallen Records was an American record label formed by Sean Gilfillan and Sidney DeMello in 2006. Gilfillan considered it "the world's first military record label" as it featured exclusively veteran artists.

The label gave back to the military by donating a percentage of proceeds to organizations dedicated to honoring the fallen, or assisting disabled soldiers and their families. To The Fallen Records has been featured on CBS Evening News, NPR, Rolling Stone, The New York Times Magazine and the UK's The Sunday Times and Guardian, among others.

In 2009, the distributor for the label went bankrupt and Gilfillan was plunged into debt. He later formed To The Fallen Entertainment, a company contracted to provide military personnel with live entertainment.

== Releases ==
Shortly after its establishment, the label released To The Fallen Records Presents Hip-Hop: Volume I, which was shortly followed by To The Fallen Records Presents Country: Volume I and To The Fallen Records Presents Rock: Volume I.

The label followed these releases, culled from current and veteran soldiers from the Army, Navy, Air Force, Marines and National Guard, with their first mixed-genre compilation, To The Fallen Records Presents: Say Goodbye, the first album in their "The Ten" series. All the artists featured have served in Operation Iraqi Freedom or Operation Enduring Freedom.
