= Tetrapod Spools =

Tetrapod Spools was an Encinitas, California, USA based independent record label founded in Oak Park, Illinois in 1969 by Louie Easley Hanley and Mark Tucker. The label originally released music on reel-to-reel and cassette, later producing limited edition vinyl records. The best known release on Tetrapod Spools is undoubtedly Tucker's 1975 album "Batstew" which has achieved cult status and become a highly sought-after collectible. Tetrapod Spools relocated to Encinitas, California in 1980. The company stopped releasing vinyl records in 1983 but continued to produce albums on CD throughout the late 1990s.

== See also ==
- List of record labels
