= VAWS =

German neo-Nazi record label

VAWS (Verlag und Agentur Werner Symanek) is a German Neo-Nazi record label. They promote neofolk, industrial and bands in related genres, such as Von Thronstahl. Artists such as Feindflug have left the label.

== See also ==
- List of record labels
