= Radiex Records =

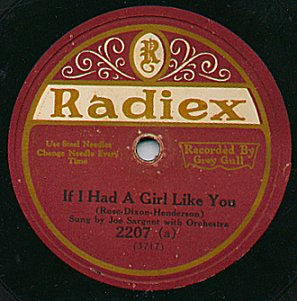
- Parent company: Grey Gull Records
- Founded: 1921
- Defunct: 1931
- Country of origin: U.S.

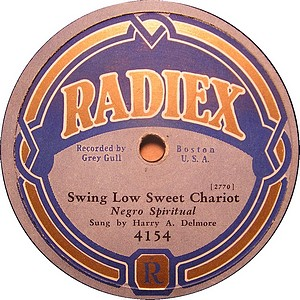
Radiex Label - 'Standards' Series

Radiex Records was an American record label during the 1920s. It was manufactured by Grey Gull Records of Boston, Massachusetts, from 1921 until the demise of Grey Gull in late 1930; it was then pressed for a few more months into 1931 by the successor firm, which continued the Radiex, Van Dyke and Madison labels. Radiex records were sold in Montgomery Ward catalogs although they were not manufactured specifically for that firm. In some cases, records have been found which had the labels of other Grey Gull products over Radiex labels or vice versa.

Radiex records were standard, lateral-cut, double-sided 78 rpm discs pressed in various colours of shellac which generally wore down easily. The earliest paper sleeves in which Radiex records were sold described them as "The Record of Beauty." The issues are popular vocal and dance numbers of the era, from masters recorded by Grey Gull, Plaza Music, Emerson Records, and sometimes Paramount Records. The Radiex label was discontinued (on 78 r.p.m. discs) in 1931

A fairly large number of label designs and colour variations were used on Radiex records over its short lifespan. Little is known about the source of the "Radiex" name, which may have been used to suggest some connection with radio.

Radiex discs bore the same catalog numbers, and contained the same material, as Grey Gull and other products of that company. There are, however, examples of Radiex issues using other takes of the same tunes as the corresponding Grey Gull issues (for example, Sweethearts on Parade on Radiex 1587, which uses a faster take -A with partly different solos than on the slower take -B used on Grey Gull 1587). Radiex Records were numbered in a 1000 series (dance music), a 2000 series (vocal), a 4000 series (standards) and a seldom-found 7000 race series, along with a mysterious 8000/8100 series whose function is not currently known.

When the Grey Gull firm ceased business in late 1930, a successor firm continued pressing Radiex, Van Dyke and Madison records until some point in the spring of 1931. These records carried Madison numbers (5000s followed by 6000s) and also had an 800/900 series which paired older Grey Gull "B" sides; a few country records have been seen with 51xx numbers. These records are visibly slightly different from the earlier Boston-pressed Grey Gull products.

Record collector and reissue specialist David Lennick of Toronto, Ontario, revived the use of the Radiex name for CDs.

== See also ==
- List of record labels
- Grey Gull Records
