= Ungulates (label) =

Japanese independent record label

ungulates
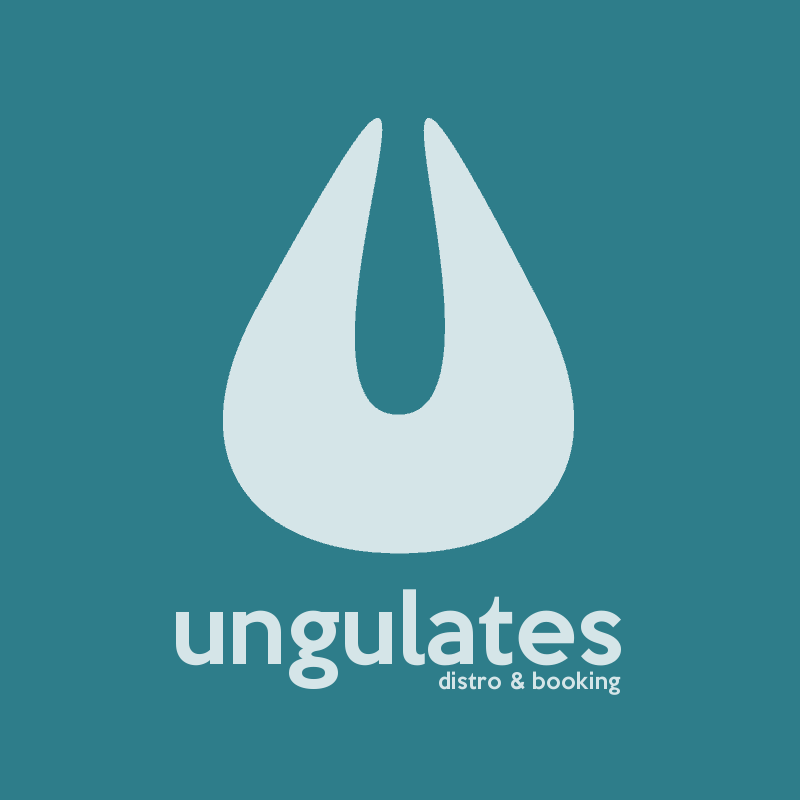
- Founded: 2017
- Founder: Kou Nakagawa
- Genre: emo; indie rock; hardcore; post rock
- Country of origin: Japan
- Location: Tokyo

Ungulates (stylized as ungulates) is an independent record label based in Tokyo, Japan and was officially established in 2017 by Kou Nakagawa.

Ungulates specializes in cassette tape, CD and vinyl record releases for emo, indie rock, hardcore, punk, and post rock independent artists in Japan.

As part of its philosophy to provide indie bands a means to reach a wider audience, ungulates also does digital distributions online, especially through Bandcamp.

As well as being a label, ungulates also functions as an event and tour organizer in Japan for independent Japanese bands and foreign artists touring in Japan.

Also in line with its philosophy to enable independent musicians to expand their music cross-border, ungulates runs a distro distributing releases by independent bands from Japan and abroad and has collaborated with other independent labels from outside of Japan for split-album releases.

== History ==
ungulates was first conceived in 2013 by Kou Nakagawa, the drummer of san visage, for the band Clayman Clayman. It derived its name from the hooves of the Okapi.

=== Event bookings ===
In 2017, the label was revived as an event organizer for foreign indie bands touring in Japan.

That year, ungulates organized the Tokyo show of the Japan tour for the American hardcore band, Graf Orlock. The Australian artist, Sam Haven, also toured Japan under bookings by ungulates in the same year.

Adhering to its philosophy to provide opportunities to indie bands, ungulates continued organizing Japan tours for indie bands.

In 2018 alone, ungulates organized and hosted the tours of three bands from various countries. Starting with the joint tour for the American bands, Hemingway and Walter Etc. in March, and continuing with the Swedish shoegaze band, Mystery Language, in May, and finally capping off the year with a 6-show tour by the Malaysian emo punk band, Social Circuit, in November.

In 2019, ungulates organized the Japan tour for the New Zealand band, Carb on Carb.

=== Music label and distribution ===
A pivotal point for the label came in 2020, when due to a lull in the live music scene because of the COVID-19 pandemic, ungulates redirected its efforts to music releases instead, focusing on digital music and also small-scale production of albums on cassette tape and CDs.

In 2020, ungulates released its first digital release and the cassette tape version for the emo band, as a sketch pad, led by the Andy Schueneman of the American band, Worst Party Ever.

Since then, ungulates has continued to release both physical and digital albums, EPs and split albums for independent Japanese emo and indie rock bands such as downt, Kudaranai1nichi (くだらない1日), ANORAK!, togaru (とがる) and more, and has become one of the leading independent labels at the forefront of the Japanese emo scene.

In addition to releases for Japanese bands, ungulates has also been involved in collaborative releases with independent labels in Asia and Europe.

In 2020, ungulates collaborated with 6 other independent record labels to release the vinyl of the Japanese version of the album Nya Slussen by the Swedish hardcore band, Det Är Därför Vi Bygger Städer. Also in 2020, ungulates, along with the Chinese label QIIISNACKS and the Taiwanese label, 22 Records, released the CD, 10-inch vinyl, cassette tape and digital version of the album HATE/LOVE by the Chinese hardcore band, Bennu is a Heron.

In 2021, ungulates collaborated with the label Tired Records in Singapore and KAT Records in Indonesia to release a 3-way split album with the bands Cue (from Singapore), Hulica (from Indonesia) and Kundaranai1nichi.

=== Other activities ===
Ungulates distributes its physical releases mainly through independent online stores and also through selected independent music stores around Japan. However, in order to help independent bands to reach a wider audience, ungulates does its digital releases mostly through bandcamp and music streaming services such as Spotify and Apple Music.

Notably, in 2022, two bands under ungulates, downt and Sonic Grandmother (音速ばばあ), performed in Fuji Rock Festival.

== Artists ==
The following are artists with releases by Ungulates:

=== Japanese bands ===
- as a sketch pad
- Shapeshifter
- POINT HOPE
- downt
- Kudaranai1nichi (くだらない1日)
- ANORAK!
- togaru (とがる)
- soccer.
- Sonic Grandmother (音速ばばあ)
- Injury Tape
- Ayumi Nakamura
- Curve
- Lac(rima)
- 7th Jet Balloon
- Japanese Football
- STARSHIP
- Rasen.(らせん。)

=== Asian, European and North American bands ===
- Det Är Därför Vi Bygger Städer (Sweden)
- Bennu is a Heron (Taiwan)
- Hulica (Indonesia)
- Cues (Singapore)

== Releases ==
The following are releases by Ungulates:

Release date	Artist	Title	Format	Type	Catalog
10-9-2013	Clayman Clayman	Good News	Digital, CD	Album	UNGL-001
7-1-2018	POINT HOPE	Houi	Digital, Book	EP	UNGL-002
4-12-2020	Det Är Därför Vi Bygger Städer	Nya Slussen	Digital, LP	Album	UNGL-003
5-26-2020	as a sketch pad	as a sketch pad	Digital, Cassette Tape	EP	UNGL-004
10-10-2020	Bennu is a Heron	Hate/Love	Digital, CD, LP, Cassette Tape	Album	UNGL-005
2-14-2021	Kudaranai1nichi (くだらない1日) / ANORAK!	Split	Digital, Cassette Tape	Split EP	UNGL-006
5-27-2021	togaru (とがる)	I'll See You If We're Alive (生きていたら逢いましょう)	Digital, Cassette Tape	Album	UNGL-007
7-23-2021	Kudaranai1nichi (くだらない1日) / Hulica / Cues	3-Way Split	Digital, Cassette Tape	Split EP	UNGL-008
10-1-2021	downt	downt	Digital, CD, Cassette Tape	Album	UNGL-009
1-7-2022	Shapeshifter	Dark Ritual	Digital, CD, Cassette Tape	Album	UNGL-010
3-18-2022	Injury Tape	Songs I Mailed To Myself	Digital, CD, Cassette Tape	Album	UNGL-011
4-29-2022	Kudaranai1nichi (くだらない1日)	rebound	Digital, CD, LP, Cassette Tape	Album	UNGL-012
5-20-2022	soccer. / Sonic Grandmother (音速ばばあ)	Split	Digital, CD, Cassette Tape	Split EP	UNGL-013
6-5-2022	downt	SAKANA e.p.	Digital, CD, EP, LP, Cassette Tape	EP	UNGL-014
7-22-2022	Ayumi Nakamura	Strata	Digital, CD, Cassette Tape	Album	UNGL-015
7-22-2022	togaru (とがる)	This is the Last Time (これで最期)	Digital, CD	Album	UNGL-016
8-26-2022	Curve	Till The End (10th Anniversary Edition)	Digital, Album, Cassette Tape	Album	UNGL-017
8-4-2022	Lacrima	Lac(rima)	Digital, Cassette Tape	EP	UNGL-018
3-24-2023	togaru (とがる)/Rasen.(らせん。)	Togaru to Rasen (とがるとらせん。)	Digital, CD	Split EP	UNGL-020
4-6-2023	7th Jet Balloon	Pleasant, Sadness, And...	Digital, CD	EP	UNGL-021
4-6-2023	STARSHIP	S	Digital, CD	EP	UNGL-022
4-7-2023	Japanese Football	S/T	Digital, Cassette Tape	EP	UNGL-019
