= Seclusiasis =

Philadelphia record label

- Founded: 2004
- Founder: Gair Marking, Paul Geissinger
- Genre: Street Bass
- Country of origin: United States
- Location: Philadelphia, PA
- Official website: http://www.seclusiasis.com

Seclusiasis is a Philadelphia, Pennsylvania-based record label run by Paul Geissinger and Gair Marking. The label is known for their street bass sound, an amalgam of bass music styles with an emphasis on the use of vocal sampling.

Seclusiasis started in 2001 under Gair Marking, Philadelphia DJ Dev79, as a club promotion collective hosting events and parties around the Philadelphia region. A few years later, Paul Geissinger returned to Philadelphia from London and began incorporating the early UK grime music he had been influenced by into his DJ sets . In 2004, Paul Geissinger connected with Marking as Seclusiasis evolved into a record label.

In 2006 Seclusiasis began the Street Bass Anthems compilation series to promote the street bass crossover of hip-hop and bass music.

== See also ==
- List of record labels
