= Toes in the Sand Recordings =

Toes in the Sand Recordings is a US-based record label founded by David Christopher (aka Deviant) and Amy Dana in 2004. Specializing in progressive house and progressive breaks, their releases place an emphasis on musicality, arrangement, and composition. Their first release, "Bound for Ascension" by Michael Lanning, is featured on Balance 006 [EQ] mixed by Anthony Pappa. Other releases have appeared on compilations by Andrew K, Sprout Music, and more.

== See also ==
- List of record labels
