= See Bee Records =

Early Black-owned record label

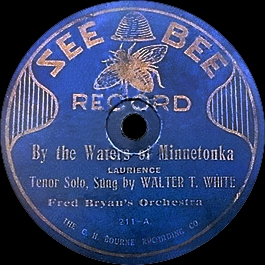
- Parent company: C. H. Bourne Recording Co.
- Founded: 1921
- Defunct: 1922-1929
- Status: Inactive
- Country of origin: US
- Location: New York City

See Bee Records was one of the earliest black owned and/or operated record labels in the United States. Founded in 1921, it catered primarily towards a black audience, as it is believed the label was founded as the first deliberate competitor to Black Swan Records.

Little is known about the label or the parent company, the C. H. Bourne Recording Co. The matrix numbers suggest that the masters were possibly contracted through the Jones central recording laboratories.

== History ==
No incorporation records exist for the C. H. Bourne Recording Co., nor was a copyright filed on the label. The label was likely conceived in New York around mid-1921, as their first advertisements appeared later that year.

If the C. H. Bourne Recording Co. really existed or was merely a dummy corporation to make a quick profit is unknown. Most of the recordings were original issues directed towards a growing black population with disposable income, similar to the business model of Black Swan Records.

"Explanation of the Objects of the Universal Negro Improvement Association"
Complete 1921 speech

It is unlikely the C. H. Bourne Recording Co. recorded any masters, as the matrix numbers suggest they were contracted through an outside source. The matrix numbers are similar to those used by the Jones central recording laboratories, who supplied masters for Lyric Records and Arto Records.

The music issued was mainly dance band jazz and blues to capitalize off its growing popularity within the black community. Its only notable issue was the recorded speech of Marcus Garvey, founder and first President-General of the Universal Negro Improvement Association and African Communities League. Only around a dozen different issues are known to exist.

It is unknown when the label folded; some suggest it lasted well into 1929, while others state it only lasted around a year. Most advertisements found are through 1921-1922. There is a strong possibility it folded around the same time as Black Swan, between 1922 and 1924.
