= Discos Taxco =

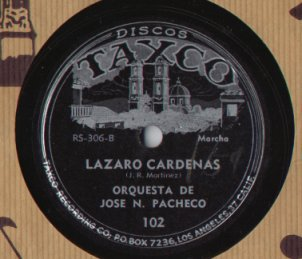
- Country of origin: Mexico

Discos Taxco was a mid 20th century record label specializing in Mexican music. The label was mostly marketed in Mexico, but was manufactured in Los Angeles, California, in the United States of America. It was owned by William Castillo. It was one of the few record labels in the United States catering to Chicanos following the Second World War which achieved more than local distribution.

== See also ==
- List of record labels
