= Stigmata (record label) =

German record label

Stigmata is a German record label.

Founded in 1999, as the underground offspring of studio partners Chris Liebing and André Walter, their legendary Stigmata series has become a unique and widespread driving force in the global techno scene.

== See also ==
- List of record labels
