= Grey Gull Records =

Record company and label founded in Boston, Massachusetts

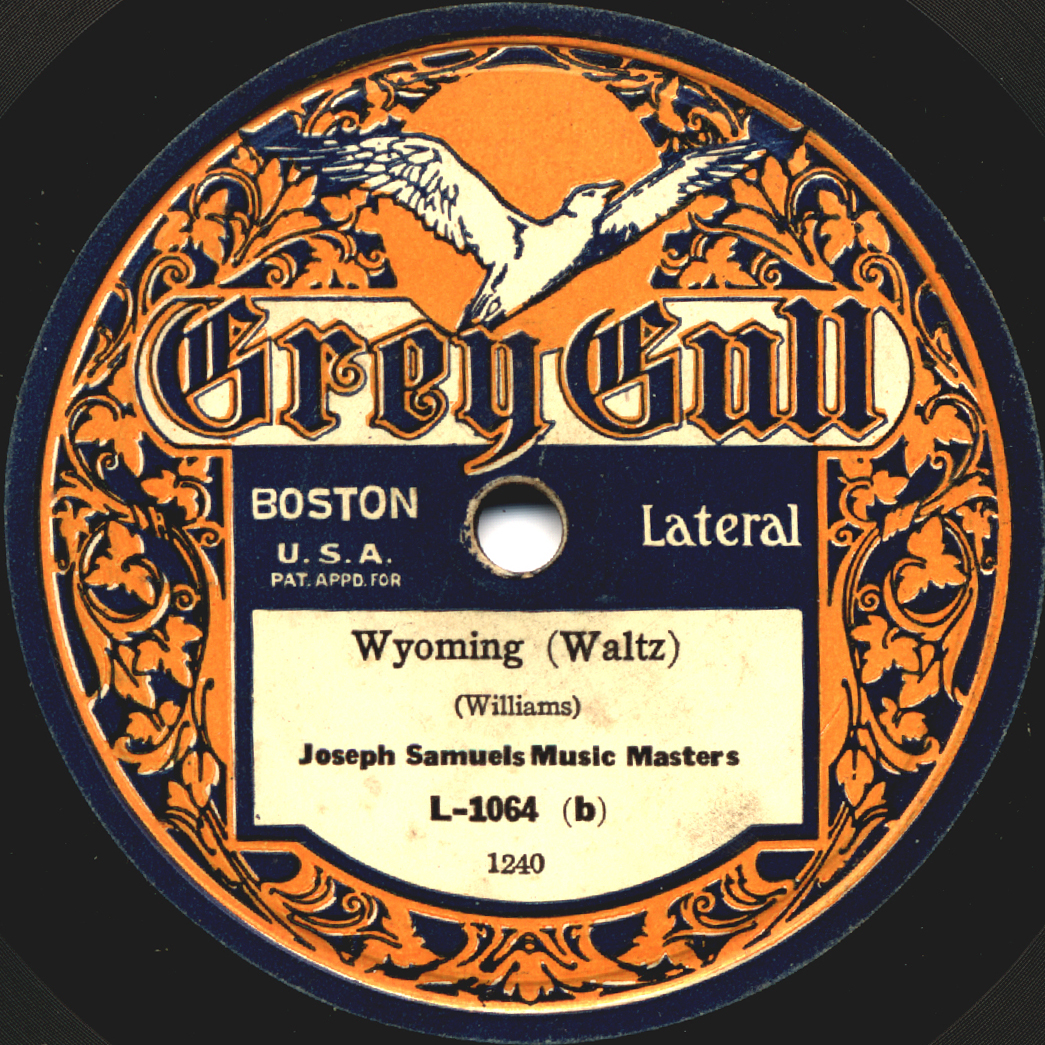
- 1921 disc featuring the orchestra of Joseph Samuels
- Founded: 1919
- Founder: Theodore Lyman Shaw
- Defunct: 1934
- Genre: Jazz, pop
- Country of origin: U.S.
- Location: Boston, Massachusetts

Grey Gull Records was a record company and label founded in Boston, Massachusetts in 1919. The company was started by Theodore Lyman Shaw, a member of an upper class family from Wellesley, Massachusetts.

Shaw was involved in a number of business projects, including the Marcus Lucius Quinn School of Music in Dorchester. He operated an advertising business (Harvard University Class of 1905, 25th Anniversary Report, 575). According to the Massachusetts Department of Corporation and Taxation, Grey Gull was incorporated on December 31, 1919 and dissolved on March 31, 1934. (Acts 1934, c.187)

== History ==
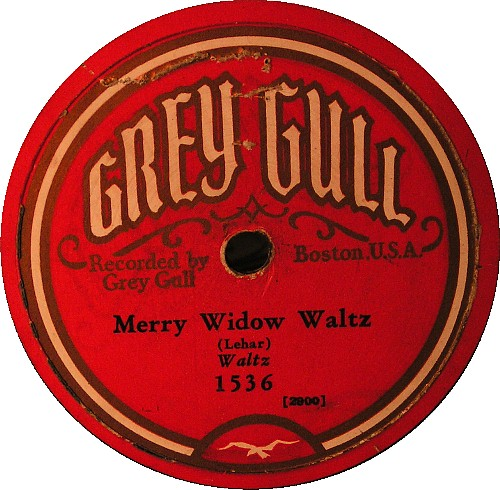
Red label design from the later half of the 1920s

Grey Gull Records began at 295 Huntington Avenue in Boston (advertisement in Talking Machine World, 15 October 1920, p. 192), but city directories show that by 1923 the company's offices were in South Boston at 135 Dorchester Avenue. In the early 1920s, Grey Gull discs were recorded and manufactured at a plant at 81 Wareham Street in Boston ("Local Studio," C7; Boston Globe classified ad, 21 August 1920, p. 9)

The first issues of Grey Gull were high-quality, vertical-cut discs sold at premium prices. Their small grooves were to be played with a needle or stylus, giving about twice the playing time of the standard 10-inch 78 rpm. Most offered more than one selection per side. These records bore catalog numbers prefixed with an "H," probably because vertical-cut discs were called "Hill and Dale" (Marco, 302-303)

These unusual records sold poorly at a rather high price for the time of one dollar each. They were phased out by 1920 to be replaced by the more common lateral-cut records. The essential patent on such discs had expired in 1919. The lateral discs bore catalog numbers prefixed with "L" (for lateral) and sold for the same high price. These records were recorded in Boston, where the company and Shaw were located ("Local Studio," C7). In 1926 Grey Gull's recording operations were moved to New York City. A New York Times mention on 24 April 1926, p. 31 said Grey Gull had leased offices on the fifth floor of 20 East 42nd Street in Manhattan. An announcement of the move also appeared in the trade publication Talking Machine World on 15 July 1926.

By 1922, Grey Gull records were priced at 55 cents each. Shaw placed a series of newspaper ads, publicizing this price and asserting that his Grey Gull Records were "Better than 75-cent records...much better" (ad in The Philadelphia Inquirer, 10 September 1922, p. 6). He introduced a method of selling records that became standard in the music industry. Grey Gull placed display racks offering their latest product in newsstands, cigar stores, drug stores, and other businesses, returning on a regular basis to restock the racks and settle accounts with the merchant, a system known today as rack jobbing. The racks are mentioned in some of the ads Shaw placed, and Grey Gull Records became associated with them (see for example "This Famous Rack is Everywhere," Springfield Republican, 12 November 1923, p. 7). A good example of Shaw's strategy of placing the racks in a wide variety of locations can be seen in an ad for Ruth's Drug Store in Elyria, Ohio. The druggist, Dr. Robert J. Ruth, offered to demonstrate the records to those who came into his store (Elyria Chronicle Telegram, 3 June 1922, p. 9).

With the drop in price came a drop in quality. Grey Gull had also introduced its Radiex Records label, and it too offered low-priced records. Raymond's department store in Boston advertised Radiex records for 40 cents each, or two for 75 cents, in a Boston Globe ad (30 July 1922, p. 10). In 1924, a Los Angeles department store advertised Radiex records at 47 cents each, or three for $1.35 (Los Angeles Times, 21 September 1924, p. B26). Grey Gull also pressed client labels, such as Oriole for the McCrory chain, and later pressed by the Plaza Music Company, and Amco, Nadsco, and Globe, the latter possibly a continuation of an earlier label of that name.

During this period, Grey Gull typically put one "hit" song on the top side and original composition by one of the company's "staff composers" on the flip side. Mike Mosiello contributed instrumentals (many often released on several issues with varying titles) which, apart from solo work by himself and Andy Sannella, often featured the accordionist Charles Magnante and xylophone virtuoso George Hamilton Green. This unusual line-up, combined with Grey Gull's over-modulated sound, give these records a particular sound of their own. Vocalists included Irving Kaufman and Arthur Fields. Elmer Feldkamp was often heard as vocalist on The California Ramblers sides of 1929–1930. Grey Gull went out of business at the end of September 1930.

Grey Gull used primarily their own recordings during 1922 and 1923, although some were leased from other companies such as Plaza, Emerson, and the New York Recording Laboratories. The label did more of its own recording after 1926 with a house band that included trumpeter Mike Mosiello and clarinetist Andy Sannella. Grey Gull released music by Cliff Jackson, Clarence Williams, and the Wabash Trio. Grey Gull's recordings were also released by other labels, such as Madison, Radiex, Supreme, and Van Dyke.

== See also ==
- List of record labels

== Sources and works cited ==
- "Local Studio Solves Problem". Boston Herald, 8 May 1921, p. C7
- "Robert Gould Shaw Dies in Brookline". Boston Evening Transcript, 10 April 1931, p. 1
- Marco, Guy A. ed. Encyclopedia of Recorded Sound in the United States. New York: Garland, 1993
- Rust, Brian. The American Record Label Book (New York, 1984)
- Sutton, Allan. Directory of American Disc Record Brands and Manufacturers, 1891-1943 (Westport & London, 1994)
