= Starstream Records =

Record label

- Founded: 1980
- Country of origin: United States
- Location: Houston, Texas

Starstream Records was the record label for Starstream Communications Group, Inc., a Houston, Texas based radio promotions company (1980–1990).

It was formed as the record label supporting a national talent search, The Big Music America Contest, developed by Kenneth Kramer with support from Harold Stream, a Louisiana businessman and Dr. Donald Altfeld, a songwriter and music producer best known for co-writing "The Little Old Lady (from Pasadena)" by Jan and Dean and co-producing "It Never Rains In Southern California" by Albert Hammond.

Originally the label was known as Nova Records and the first release was Nova Records MS7801 - The Best of Mississippi.

Later, when the contest changed from the Big Music America Contest to the Miller High Life Rock To Riches Talent Search, the operating company was changed from Big Music America to Starstream Communications Group.

Approximately 250 albums and singles were released by Starstream as part of local rock, soul and Hispanic music talent searches conducted by Starstream and local radio stations in top US markets.

Radio stations releasing LPs on the Starstream label include WCOZ, Boston; WAPP, New York, WPDH Poughkeepsie, KLOL, Houston, KLOS, Los Angeles and KSJO, San Jose.

Alumni of Starstream albums include Bon Jovi (WAPP), Twisted Sister (WAPP), Jon Butcher (WCOZ) and The Replacements & Peter Himmelman (KQDS) and WARHEAD (WZLD - Columbia SC) (@warhead) (www.heavenandhellrecords.com)

The Soul/R&B titles released by Starstream were part of the Budweiser Showdown Talent Search Contest. Participating Radio Stations included WRKS, NY, WBMX Chicago, KJLH and KDAY in Los Angeles and KMJQ and KYOK in Houston.

Recording of all individual tracks was handled by the bands and occasionally the radio station. The individual tapes to be included on the album were then sent to Starstream where they were mixed and mastered onto tape and sent off to be mastered onto disc. Cook Sound, owned by local Houston radio personality Dwight Cook was used for most of the mastering. The early master discs were cut by Bernie Grundman at Capitol Records and then later M.C, Rather at Columbia Records in Nashville and Carl Rowatti at Truetone in New York. Pressing was originally done at Columbia Records Custom Pressing in Indiana and New Jersey. Later, (early mid 80's), pressing moved to Peter Pan Industries in New Jersey where it stayed until the end.

A few of the early Budweiser Showdown discs were also pressed at Houston Record Plant.

== See also ==
- Starstream Records Discography
- Starstream Records Discography (illustrated)
- Starstream label story
- List of record labels
