= Steelwork Maschine =

French-based independent record label

- Founded: 2003
- Founder: Kris G., Serge U.
- Genre: Various
- Country of origin: France
- Location: Brest, France
- Official website: Steelwork Maschine

Steelwork Maschine is an independent record label based in Brest, France, specialising in producing, and distributing through their mail-order, extreme musics from the industrial and post-industrial genres, such as Martial industrial, Dark Ambient, Neo-classical, Neo-folk, Power Electronics, Noise, and Experimental.

== History ==
Steelwork Maschine was founded in 2003 by Kris G. (a pseudonym for Christophe Gales, member of Westwind) and Serge Usson (member of Neon Rain and Storm Of Capricorn), after the demise of Kris G's previous CD-R label Black Sun Rising. It is registered in France as a voluntary association. Steelwork Maschine also started a mail-order store on internet in 2004.

=== Productions ===
Started as a way to produce their own releases (Neon Rain's CD Dirtier Than The Dirt and Westwind's double LP Tourmente I), Steelwork Maschine quickly started to produce other artists' records, beginning with French projects PPF & ICK's collaborative LP Individualistes / Collectivistes in 2005, then with Cheerleader 69's LP Godriders In The Sky in 2006. The label then went away from the vinyl format with the releases of Deuterror's CD Le Gueule de Guerre in 2007, and Neon Rain's We Are Meat in 2008.

=== Sub-label ===
A sublabel called Steelkraft Manufactory was created in 2007, with the purpose of releasing CD-Rs in small editions of 100 copies, with hand-made covers (blank digipaks, stickers...). The first series started with the release of the collaborative record Ligne Claire, and has now reached its 10th reference with Dunkelheit's album Temps Modernes.

=== Concerts organisation ===
Steelwork Maschine has been erratically organizing concerts in Brest, including two concerts by English post-industrial music group Death in June, which now remain the two last concerts ever played by the band. They have not organized other events since 2006.

== Artists ==
- IIIII
- The Austrasian Goat
- Babylone Chaos
- Blake's Optimism
- Cheerleader 69
- Cober Ord
- Contagious Orgasm
- Crisis
- Death in June
- Deuterror
- Dunkelheit
- The Enchanted Wood
- Exworks
- Feigur
- Follow Me Not
- H-P Unit 14
- Hikikomori
- Hyperbarich Yperite Therapy Chamber (HYTC)
- ICK
- L'Idiot du Village
- Irrumatorium
- Isothesis
- Kutulu
- Ligne Claire
- Lisieux
- Neon Rain
- New Axis
- PPF
- Service Special
- Solventis
- Storm Of Capricorn
- Thar Mapsal Program
- Vesperal
- Westwind
