= Unable Records =

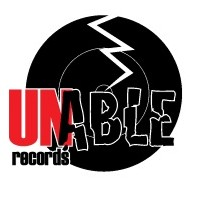
- Parent company: Unable Music Group
- Founded: 2007
- Founder: Mike Ransom, Amanda Price Ransom, Kevin Hanning, Devon Bradford
- Distributors: Unable Distribution Division, Unable Music Group
- Genre: Punk, Metal, Rock, Alternative, EDM, Pop
- Country of origin: United States
- Location: Cherry Hill, New Jersey
- Official website: UnableRecords.com

Unable Records is an independent record label headquartered in Cherry Hill, New Jersey. The label was founded in 2007 by partners Mike Ransom, Amanda Price Ransom, Kevin Hanning, and Devon Bradford in Jacksonville, Florida. In the fall of 2008, Unable Records relocated to Southern New Jersey but continued to operate a small office in Jacksonville for several more years.

In 2012, Unable Records merged with the New Jersey–based recording studio, 0x1 Sound Studio. The merger created a parent company known as Unable Music Group, of which Unable Records and 0x1 Sound Studio are separate divisions, along with Unable Distribution. During the merger, founding partners Kevin Hanning and Devon Bradford left the company, being replaced by 0x1 Sound Studio owner/engineer Jason Ruch. The merger also allowed for Unable Records to move into its current location, occupying office space in a commercial park in Cherry Hill, New Jersey, not far from Philadelphia, Pennsylvania.

Unable Records specializes in the punk rock, ska, hardcore, and metal genres, but has also put out EDM/Dance, hip hop, jazz, indie rock, alternative, pop and horror releases. Unable Records has worked with many bands, including Point Blank, PlanetRAWK, The Bastard Suns, No Fuego, Murder Majesty, Ransom Price, Mexican Ape-Lord, Mongrel, In The Go, Violence in Ascension and King Rat. Unable Records has also worked with artists such as Raquel Castro, Liz Primo, Mariah Simmons, Dark Intensity, Amai Liu, DJ Lynnwood, among others.

== Artists ==
=== Punk ===
- Banned Anthem
- The Bastard Suns
- Cavaverman (Italy)
- The Clap
- The Cuthbert Kids
- Fury Within
- King Rat
- La Melancolía de Don Quixote (Panama)
- Loss of Effect
- Murder Majesty
- No Fuego
- Point Blank
- Ransom Price
- The Turnbucklers
- Two Step With Marlon Brando

=== Metal ===
- American Noir
- Binary Creed (Sweden)
- Blood Tribe
- Demons Within
- Gasoline Guns (Ukraine)
- Loss of Reason
- Mexican Ape-Lord (former Meliah Rage)
- Mongrel
- Nation of Decay
- Nations
- Siravo
- Tides of Deception
- To The Pain
- Valleys
- Vengince
- Violence in Ascension (VIA)
- Volt

=== Alternative/Indie Rock ===
- 208 Talks of Angels (Russia)
- Halfblack
- In The Go (Croatia)
- PlanetRAWK
- Nadia Kazmi
- One Eyed Jack (Italy)
- Shame (Italy)
- Square Head Killers (Spain)
- Subjerk

=== EDM/Dance & Pop ===
- Aki Starr
- Amai Liu
- Dark Intensity
- DJ Lynnwood
- Liz Primo
- Jennifer Lafayette
- Mariah Simmons
- Raquel Castro
