= Supreme =

Supreme may refer to:

== Entertainment ==
- Supreme (character), a comic book superhero created by Rob Liefeld
- Supreme (film), a 2016 Telugu film
- Supreme (producer), hip-hop record producer
- "Supreme" (song), a 2000 song by Robbie Williams
- The Supremes, Motown-era singer group
- Supreme Pictures Corporation, 1930s film company

== Other ==
- Supreme (brand), a clothing brand based in New York
- Supreme (cookery), a term used in cookery
- Supreme, Louisiana, a census-designated place in the United States
- Supreme Soviet, the highest legislation body of Soviet Union, dissolved in 1991
- Oldsmobile Cutlass Supreme, car produced by Oldsmobile between 1966 and 1997
- Plaxton Supreme, British coach bodywork built in the late 1970s and early 1980s
- Kenneth "Supreme" McGriff, former American drug lord and head of crime syndicate the Supreme Team

== See also ==
- Supreme Records (disambiguation), several record labels
- Supremo (disambiguation)
- Supreme court
- Supremacy (disambiguation)
