= Star Recordings =

Estimé Records is a New York based record label that was founded in 2003 by Owner Alan Estimé. The company operates independently and gives the artist they sign the creative freedom in their work. You can find all of Estimé Records releases at Apple music, spotify and other major digital music stores. Estimé Records was previously called Star Recordings, the company went through the name change in 2011.
