= Van Dyke Records =

American record label

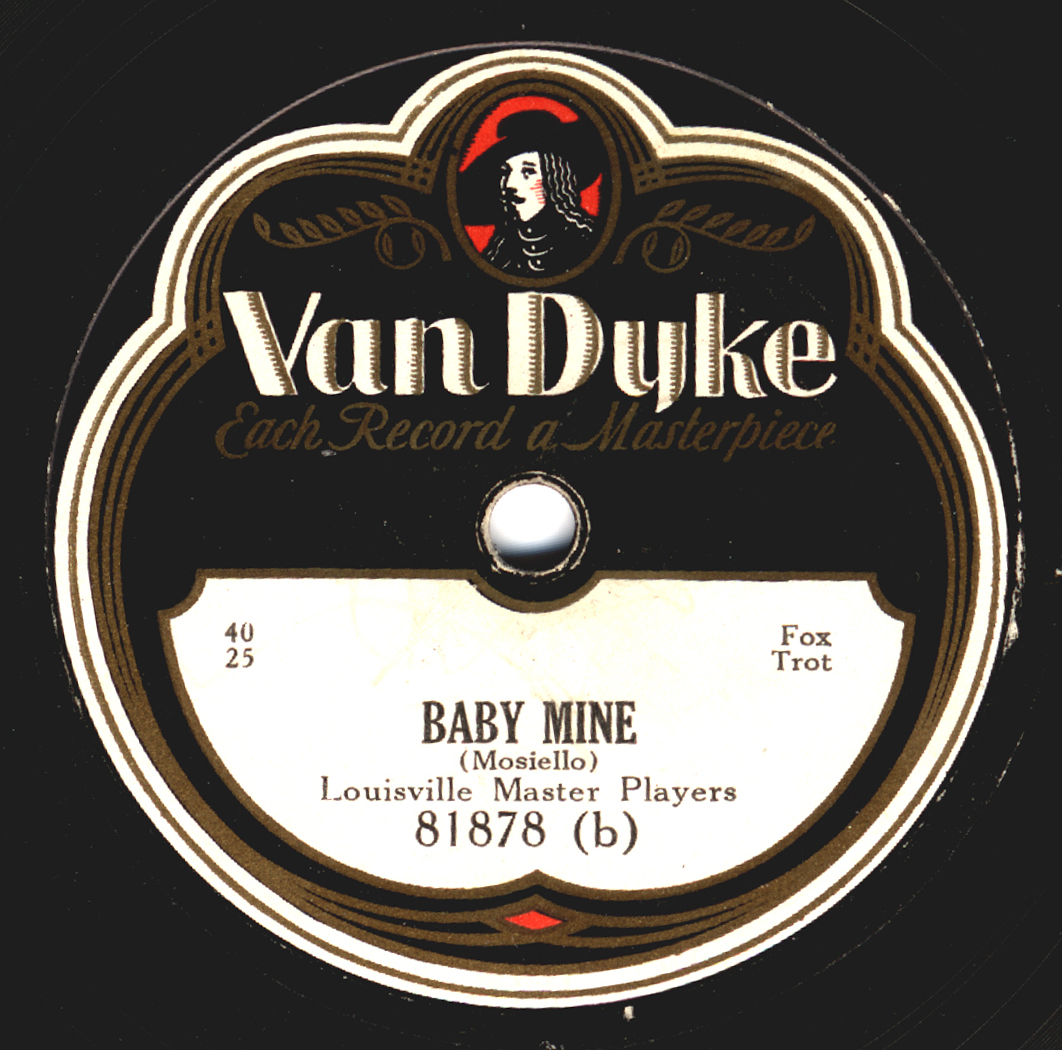
Van Dyke record label featuring Baby Mine, one of the many compositions written for the Grey Gull labels by trumpeter Mike Mosiello

Van Dyke Records was a budget American record label which operated in 1929 and 1930. Van Dyke was a subsidiary of Grey Gull Records of Boston, Massachusetts and releases duplicated material found on the parent label. Despite claims of quality found on the label, the record was cheaply manufactured, and marketed to record dealers as a budget record with a high profit margin for the dealer. Accordingly the playing surface is noisy, and the recordings are often over-modulated.

Other than jazz by Clarence Williams and Cliff Jackson, most Van Dyke records were dance band numbers by Grey Gull's house band, which included Mike Mosiello, Andy Sannella, and Charles Magnante.

The text on the label of Van Dyke 78 discs proclaimed "Each Record a Masterpiece". An unusual feature of the Van Dyke label was that the four-digit matrix number was split between two lines on the left side. Initially the Van Dyke catalog number mirrored the Grey Gull catalog number, with an added "7" or "8" appended to the beginning. By its second year of existence the couplings no longer matched the parent company, and there was no relation between Van Dyke's numbering (now divided into several separate numbering blocks) and Grey Gull's. Nonetheless, all material continued to originate from Grey Gull. There was some effort made to obscure the origins of Van Dyke.

When Grey Gull ceased operations in 1930, Van Dyke records also were no longer produced. However, substantial quantities of the product were exported to England over the next few years, by an unknown distributor.

== See also ==
- List of record labels
