= Supreme Records (Grey Gull subsidiary) =

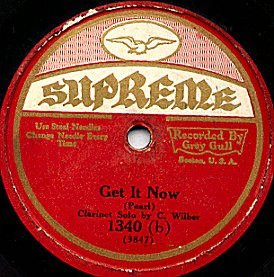
- Parent company: Grey Gull Records
- Founded: 1926
- Defunct: 1929
- Genre: Jazz
- Country of origin: U.S.

Supreme Records was a record label subsidiary of Grey Gull Records of Boston, Massachusetts, from 1926 to 1929. A different Supreme Records label was started in 1947 by Al Patrick to issue race records. Its catalog included Jimmy Witherspoon, Fletcher Henderson, Jay McShann, and Buddy Tate. After a lawsuit against Decca, this label closed in 1950.

== See also ==
- List of record labels

== Sources ==
- Allan Sutton: Directory of American Disc Record Brands and Manufacturers, 1891-1943 (Westport & London, 1994)
