= Avery Fisher =

American businessman (1906–1994)

- Born: Avery Robert Fisher; March 4, 1906; Brooklyn, New York, U.S.
- Died: February 26, 1994 (aged 87); New Milford, Connecticut, U.S.
- Known for: Transistorized amplifier, stereo radio-phonograph, philanthropy, Avery Fisher Hall

Avery Robert Fisher, known as Avery Fisher (March 4, 1906 – February 26, 1994), was an amateur violinist, a pioneer in the field of high fidelity sound reproduction, founder of the Philharmonic Radio Company and Fisher Electronics, and a philanthropist who donated millions of dollars to arts organizations and universities.

== Early life and career ==
Avery Fisher was born in Brooklyn, New York, the youngest of Charles (Anschel) (1868-1946) and Mary (Miriam) (née Byrach) (1869-1945) Fisher's six children. He came from a Jewish family. His parents had emigrated in 1903 (three years before his birth) from Kyiv, then a part of the Russian Empire.

Fisher said he became fascinated with music through his father's extensive collection of early phonograph cylinder recordings and that everyone in the family had to learn to play a musical instrument. "I was born into a musical family. Every one of my parents' children was given an opportunity to learn an instrument. Papa would go down the line: violin, piano, violin, piano, violin".

He attended DeWitt Clinton High School, graduated from New York University with a Bachelor of Science Engineering (B.Sc.Eng.) degree in 1929, and subsequently worked for six years in book publishing and book design. During this time, Fisher, an amateur violinist, began experimenting with audio design and acoustics. He wanted to make a radio that would sound like he was listening to a live orchestra — a radio that would achieve high fidelity reproduction of the original sound.

=== Book design and moonlighting as an audio equipment engineer ===
Fisher explained his desire to leave publishing and move into audio design, saying, "That's how I started to make a living when I got out of college. I worked with a publishing house, Dodd, Mead and Company – to whom I owe everything when you get right down to it. I worked at Dodd, Mead & Co. for the single most cruel person I have ever met in my lifetime – and I'm not exaggerating. This man was only a year older than I. He was the boss's son, and I think he sensed my apprehension about having a job at all. I went to work there in 1933, having been in the advertising agency that handled their account before that. That agency closed when the banks closed in 1933, and I was out of work for about six months. In the fall of that year, I went to Dodd, Mead asking if they could use my services, and they hired me for $18 a week. After about six months, perhaps out of guilt or something, they gave me a two-dollar raise. I was doing the same work there that I was doing for them at the agency, and the agency used to charge them $100 to design a [promotional] brochure. I used to turn out two or three of those a week, and I still was getting only $18 or $20."

Fisher continued, "In 1937, I noticed that the advertising department of Dodd, Mead was buying their photo-engravings from one source, and their book manufacturing department was buying from another. If they combined both those purchases and bought from one source, their quantity discount would save them just under $10,000 a year. I went to my superior, Ed Dodd, and told him about it. He said, "That's a great idea, Fisher." He never called me by my first name – always by my last, you know, like a deckhand. He said, "I think I'll do something about it." And they did. And I said, "By the way, I'd be very grateful if I could have a five-dollar raise." He could have said, "Well, not right now." But instead, he said, "Well, no. We probably could get some young Yale boy in here to do your work for less than we're paying you." That day, I said to myself, "I've got to get out of here one way or another," and I started putting [radio-phonograph] sets together for friends. I was moonlighting, and I did that for a number of years before I was in a position to get out and really spend full time on this. By 1943, I'd built up my company, Philharmonic Radio, to the point where I could draw enough money from it to earn a living. By that time, I had a wife and child. So I owe them [Dodd, Mead] everything. Because I really loved my work as a book designer, and I turned out some very fine stuff, which won prizes. One of the books I turned out was called Grassroots Jungle, which became one of the 50 best books of the year for graphic design — this is out of 40,000 titles — and Ed Dodd never let me put my name in a book for credit as the designer. Now, this is a long answer to your simple question: what got me into hi-fi? It was an act of desperation — and also of love because I really enjoyed hearing good equipment."

Fisher explained the start of his career in high-fidelity audio, saying, "...I was developing my hobby in hi-fi, and a number of friends asked me to make for them the kind of equipment I was constructing for my own home, the sort of thing that was not commercially available, the type of thing found in radio stations or movie theaters. And so I started constructing for this small group of people, and before I knew it, I had the beginnings of a business."

== Consumer electronics ==
=== Philharmonic Radio Co. ===
In 1937 Fisher established his first company, the Philharmonic Radio Company with Victor Brociner, producing the company's first high-fidelity radio receivers. Philharmonic Radio equipment was well regarded, earning Fisher the beginning of his reputation as a leader in audio equipment.

A January 1940 Consumers Union comparison test of high fidelity radio-phonograph recommended Philharmonic's $295 (equivalent to $6,779 in 2025) 14-tube Linear Standard console unit, saying "Quality of reproduction judged best of high fidelity radios tested. For critical listeners who want the best possible tone quality regardless of price, the extra cost of this model is justified." The second unit recommended was the $219 (equivalent to $5,033 in 2025) Philharmonic Futura Carillon. "Difference in quality of reproduction between this model and the Linear Standard discernible only to the musician or engineer... the tone quality of this set will be considered perfect.

With the invention of FM broadcasting by Edwin Armstrong, Fisher's desire to have a radio and amplifying device that could meet his goal of true high fidelity became a reality. In one of the earliest comparison tests of six FM receivers, Consumers Union gave the Philharmonic Futura K-1 its highest recommendation, saying "its performance on broadcast was outstanding." The November 1941 review of the $377.50 (equivalent to $8,274 in 2025) unit also said, "It also used one of the most satisfactory of the record changers tested and was best as to tone quality." The review also noted the unit was safer than others, saying, "Only radio tested with no shock hazard at record player."

In 1960, Fisher's circa 1937 "Philharmonic Futura" high-fidelity tuner with power supply and his "Philharmonic Futura" high-fidelity automatic turntable were acquired by the Smithsonian and displayed in the Electrical division of the National Museum of American History. The amplified "Philharmonic Futura" tuner assembly was deemed the "nation's first high-fidelity (audio) receiver".

=== Military and government production ===
A US government order suspended the production of radios for civilian use in April 1942.

Reformed as the Philharmonic Radio Corporation, the company started producing military radio equipment and manufacturing the SSR-5A radio receiver during World War II for the US and Allied forces. Part of the SSTR-5 (Strategic Service Transmitter-Receiver) Radio Set developed late in the war was considerably smaller than the SSTR-1 and was carried in a canvas shoulder bag. Components included the SSR-5 receiver and the SST-5 transmitter. The set was designed to be operated from battery power (the receiver uses 135V, 6V, and 1.5V). In addition to a standard model, both "A" and "B" variants were made. The SSR-5A receiver was made by Philharmonic.

Philharmonic Radio also produced airport instrument landing systems for control tower communication with commercial and military airplanes. One of their largest installations was deployed at the New York Municipal Airport, now named the LaGuardia Airport.

Fisher said, "During the war, we were working on subcontracts for the Navy. We were turning out 'IFF' equipment, which is Identification, Friend or Foe. It was a transponder, so you could tell whether an aircraft was one of ours or one of theirs. You'd send out a beam, and you had to get a signal reply back. We also designed the first instrument landing system used at LaGuardia Airport for the Civil Aeronautics Administration in Washington. In 1943, we didn't have enough money to finance the contract work we were able to get, so the company was sold to American Type Founders, who needed an electronic division. I stayed on as president until 1945, but when the war was over, I resigned and, taking certain key people with me, started Fisher Radio".

== Fisher Radio ==
Fisher sold his interest in Philharmonic Radio and founded his second audio firm, Fisher Radio Company, which developed, manufactured and marketed high-performance audio products under the trade name "The Fisher".

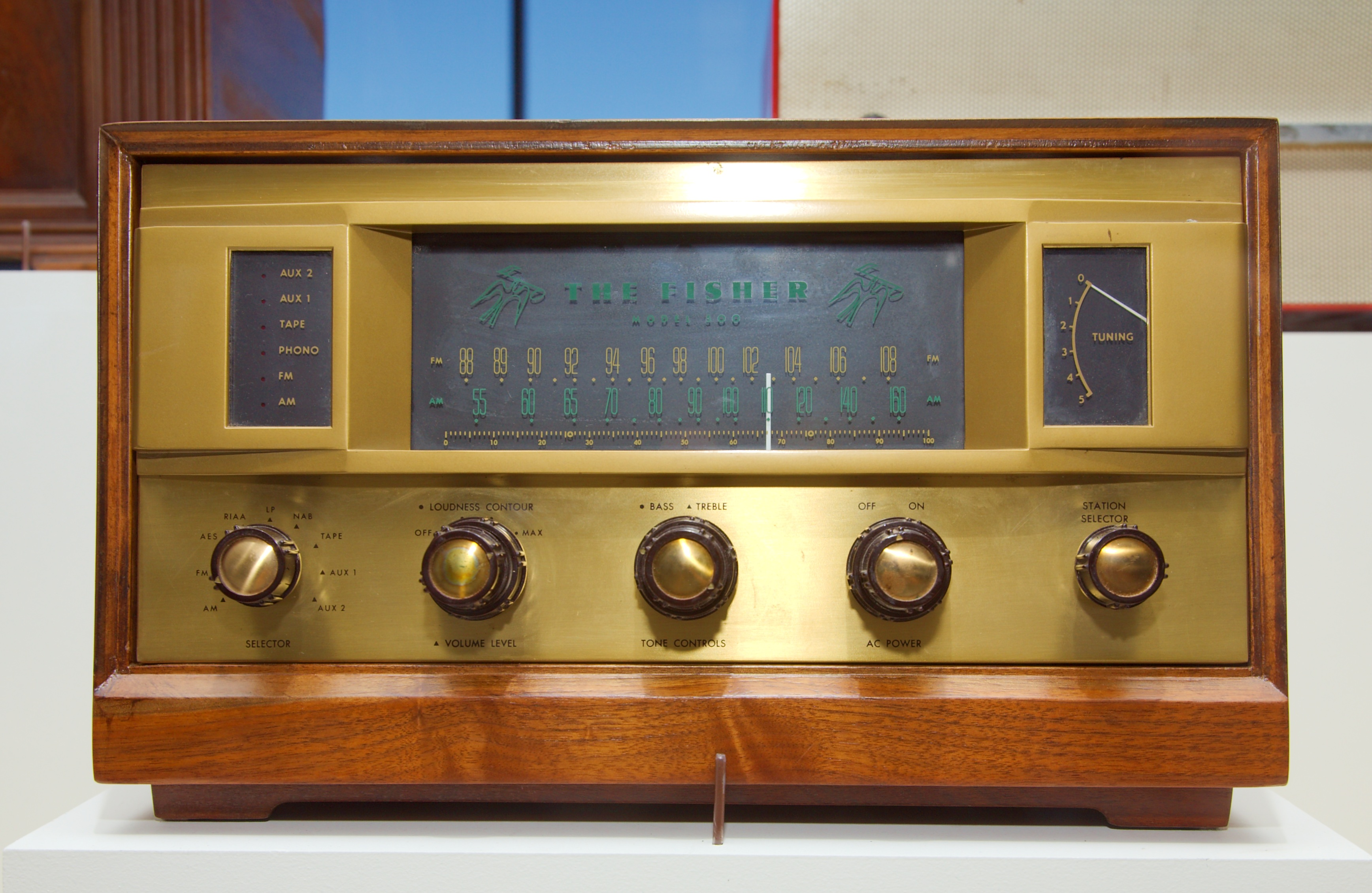
The Fisher 500 (TA500), Fisher's first hi-fi receiver (1957)

By the 1950s, the term receiver was used instead of radio for a unit that combined a tuner and an amplifier but lacked speakers. In 1957, the Fisher Radio Company produced its first high-fidelity FM/AM receiver, the monophonic 14-tube Fisher 500 (TA500).

In 1958, H. H. Scott, Inc. introduced the first true stereophonic receiver, which used a stereo multiplex decoder. Fisher followed with its $350 (equivalent to $3,866 in 2025), 22-tube, stereophonic 600 (TA600) receiver in 1959. (A multiplex option, the Fisher MPX-200, required four additional tubes.)

Between 1964 and 1968, Fisher produced a series of tube stereo receivers that are considered by many to be among the finest ever made. Starting with the 500c (which debuted in the mid $300, a hefty sum in 1964) and, paradoxically, ending with the 400, tens of thousands of these units were produced. These have become collector's items, beloved for their sound, build quality, FM tuner and phono stages, and beautiful appearance. The 400 included a green magic eye tube, which, by creating an image of a broken green bar that slowly closed to a solid bar, assisted users in tuning to the best possible position on the dial for a given station and added to the aesthetics. The 400 is considered by many to be the best-sounding of the three models.

Between 1963 and 1964, Fisher introduced their first all-transistor stereophonic receiver, the Fisher 400T. Hi-fi enthusiasts did not highly regard early transistor receivers, so manufacturers such as Fisher began using them only gradually. In the 1960s, Fisher made two trend-setting breakthroughs, marketing the first all-transistor (solid-state) amplifier and the first receiver-phonograph combination, the forerunner of the compact stereo and integrated component system. These products brought Avery Fisher both fame and fortune. From 1959 to 1961, the firm also made important improvements in AM-FM stereo tuner design.

== Sale of Fisher Electronics ==
In 1969, Fisher sold his company to the Emerson Electric Company for US $31 million. He distributed a sizable portion of the proceeds from the sale among his key employees. Fisher served as a consultant to the new management team. Sanyo purchased Fisher Electronics from Emerson in May 1977.

== Community service and philanthropy ==
A lifelong philanthropist, Fisher served on the board of Lincoln Center for the Performing Arts, the New York Philharmonic, Chamber Music Society of Lincoln Center, and the Marlboro Festival. He also established the Avery Fisher Artist Program, which includes the Avery Fisher Prize and Career Grants, in 1974.

== Avery Fisher Artist Prize ==
It was Avery's idea to start this program in 1974.

Avery Fisher Artist Prize winner Emanuel Ax said of the prize "One problem musicians face, is that we are constantly being judged. I've tried to learn not to rely on outside opinion, because if you do, you can go mad, and you can end up unable to trust your own judgment. I'm also generally not a believer in awards. The reward is inside you. But the Avery Fisher Prize is a special kind of recognition, and what makes it so tremendously gratifying is that it comes from your peers who recommend you for it – who say, 'He plays well, he's done good things, and he's worthy of being an American pianist.' I don't think the aim is to advance our careers, necessarily. It's more like the Pulitzer or the Nobel Prizes in that it acknowledges that you've achieved something worthwhile."

== The Avery Fisher Center for Music & Media ==
The Avery Fisher Center for Music & Media (originally named the "Avery Fisher Listening Room") at the Elmer Holmes Bobst Library of New York University was established in 1987 with assistance from the Avery and Janet Fisher Foundation. Fisher explained the reason for his donation to the New York University Division of Libraries, saying, "I was a graduate of N.Y.U.," he said, "and I owe a great deal to them because I was there on a working scholarship."

Later gifts from the Fisher family helped the Avery Fisher Center acquire new equipment in 2017 during renovation designed by the architectural firm Perkins Eastman and managed by the R.P. Brennan general contracting firm of New York, NY.

The Avery Fisher Center for Music and Media, an 8-library, six-million-volume system, is one of the world's largest academic media centers. "His generous contribution to NYU has helped to make the Avery Fisher Center one of the largest academic media centers in the world." The Center is located on seventh floor of NYU's Bobst Library. The Fisher Center's video collection of DVDs, Blu-rays, and videocassettes contains a wide variety of classic and contemporary featuring American videos and those from around the world. TV series, stage and concert performances, documentaries, and art films are included in the library collection. The Avery Fisher Center's facilities include collaborative media rooms and a "state-of-the-art immersion" room. One of the world's largest academic media centers, it features over 100 audio and video viewing carrels and three media-enhanced classrooms. Students and researchers use more than 100,000 audio and video recordings per year at the Avery Fisher Center.

== Avery Fisher Hall at Lincoln Center ==
=== Funded Philharmonic Hall renovation at Lincoln Center ===
Fisher was known for having donated $10.5 million (U.S.) (equivalent to $76,152,549 in 2025) to renovate the Philharmonic Hall auditorium in the Lincoln Center cultural complex in upper Manhattan. He had a reputation for modesty and resisted the hall being named in his honor. John Mazzola, the general manager of Lincoln Center, had to persuade Fisher to permit the renaming. Fisher protested that no one paid attention to such things and quipped, "Who's Major Deegan?" (a reference to the obscure namesake of the Major Deegan Expressway in the Bronx). Avery Fisher Hall housed the New York Philharmonic and was the site of various other musical and cultural events featuring many musical ensembles. The hall was named for Fisher in 1973.

=== Avery Fisher Hall renaming ===
In 2014, Lincoln Center officials announced their plan to remove Fisher's name from the Hall in favor of a new donor. On November 13, 2014, they laid out a timetable for naming rights to be sold to the highest bidder in a drive to raise $500 million toward renovation set to commence in 2019. Lincoln Center chairwoman Katherine G. Farley said, "It will be an opportunity for a major name on a great New York jewel."

=== Fisher family protest ===
When Lincoln Center first approached them about renaming Avery Fisher Hall after a new donor, Fisher's family threatened legal action. When Fisher set forth the conditions of his donation for renaming the venue in 1973, he stipulated the name "Avery Fisher Hall" would "appear on tickets, brochures, program announcements and advertisements and the like, and I consent in perpetuity to such use." During negotiations with the Fisher family, Lincoln Center began renovating some portions of the Lincoln Center complex, leaving Avery Fisher Hall untouched.

After three months of negotiation, Fisher's children agreed to end the perpetual agreement their father had established. Lincoln Center agreed to induct Fisher into the new Lincoln Center Hall of Fame meant to "celebrate artists, leaders and philanthropists who have played central roles at Lincoln Center". It was also agreed that a Fisher family member would serve on the Hall of Fame's advisory board and the Avery Fisher Classical Music Wing selection committee, helping choose inductees into the Wing, which would contain archival materials about Fisher, and that the Avery Fisher Artist Program be given a higher profile. Fisher's three children received $15 million for consenting to the agreement.

The hall was renamed David Geffen Hall in September 2015 after Geffen pledged $100 million to the renovation.

== Other interests ==
=== Book design and typography ===
Though he left publishing in 1943, he said book design was "my first love." He still designed books long after he had made a fortune in audio. He designed A History of the English-Speaking Peoples by Winston Churchill (1960) and The American Seasons by Edwin Way Teale (1976). He donated his fees for those projects to charities. Fisher told an interviewer in 1976, "Looking at a beautiful typographical design is like listening to music."

=== Music ===
One of Fisher's most prized possessions was a genuine 1692 Stradivarius violin. He loaned it to promising artists for special performances.

=== Automobiles ===
Fisher was a lifelong automobile enthusiast. As an enthusiastic driver, he said, "I began in 1932 with the purchase of an Aston Martin, and since that time, I've owned nothing but foreign cars. I still drive a 10-year-old Rover Mark III... when I die, I'll be seated at the wheel of the Rover, and the whole thing will be lowered into the ground. Of course, all gassed up, in case I want to go somewhere."

Fisher founded the A. R. Fisher Products Corporation, offering specialty products to the auto enthusiast market. He imported aftermarket foreign auto parts and sold items such as high-performance Abarth exhaust systems for Fiats and Volkswagens in the early 1950s.

== Death ==
Fisher said of his life in a 1976 interview, "You know, I've been awfully lucky. My whole life has been devoted to giving people pleasure."

Fisher died at age 87 at the New Milford Hospital in New Milford, Connecticut, on February 26, 1994, from complications from a stroke. His body was cremated.

== Legacy and honors ==
- 1956 – Elected chairman of the board, Institute of High Fidelity Manufacturers.
- 1960 – Fisher's circa 1937 "Philharmonic Futura" high-fidelity tuner with power supply and his "Philharmonic Futura" high-fidelity automatic turntable were acquired by the Smithsonian and displayed as the "nation's first high-fidelity (audio) receiver".

== See also ==
- Avery Fisher Prize
