= Hermon Hosmer Scott =

Hermon Hosmer Scott (March 28, 1909 – April 13, 1975, aged 66) was a pioneer in the Hi-Fi industry and founder of H.H. Scott, Inc.

Scott graduated from the Massachusetts Institute of Technology, where he was a member of the Phi Delta Theta fraternity. He received a doctorate from Lowell Institute. He later lectured at Dartmouth College's Tuck School of Business. Scott's inventions include the RC oscillator, the selectively tuned RC circuit, a number of RC filters, an improved sweep circuit, and the Dynaural Noise Suppressor. Scott held in excess of 100 patents in electronics. In 1957, the company moved to Maynard, MA. In 1985, the company was purchased by Emerson Electronics. Scott died April 13, 1975, in Lincoln, Massachusetts.

== Sources ==
- H.H. Scott Website
- IEEE.org - Lucius E. Packard Biography (1954)
- US Patent 2,593,175 - Electronic method and system for measuring impedance magnitude and phase angle. L.E. Packard and H.H. Scott
