= Anton Lada =

American ragtime and jazz drummer (1890–1944)

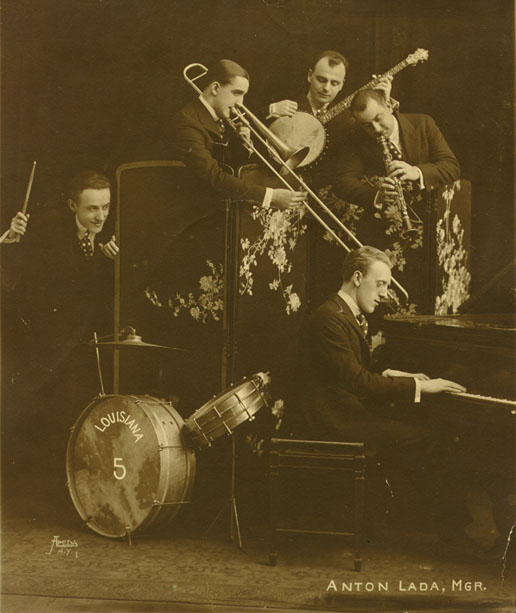
Lada on drums with the Louisiana Five

Anton Lada (September 25, 1890 – August 28, 1944) was a ragtime, jazz and dance musician. He was a drummer. He played with and was the manager of the Louisiana Five. He recorded on Columbia Records and toured. Lada performed for dancing and vaudeville shows and made a series of recordings for Emerson Records, Edison Records, and Columbia Records.

He is credited as co-composer of a number of tunes with Spencer Williams, most successfully the "Arkansas Blues".

After the breakup of his first Louisiana Five, he formed a series of his own bands before launching a new "Original Louisiana Five" band and moving to Hollywood to do film scores.

Lada was born in Prague in the Kingdom of Bohemia and moved with his family to Chicago as a child.

Lada formed various bands and made recordings with them.

He composed "Let Us Be Sweethearts Again" with Ernie Erdman in 1921. He copyrighted "Neglected Blues" with Williams.

Harry L. Alford arranged some of his songs.

== Discography ==
- "Your Voice at Twilight", words by McElbert Moore
- "Uncle Blues" (1920)
- "At Parson Jenkins' Ball (1920), words by Ed Sanford and arranged by Ray Brost
- "Blue Jay Blues" (1920) with Frank Rizzo
- "California Blossom" (1920), with Spencer Williams
