= Medallion Records =

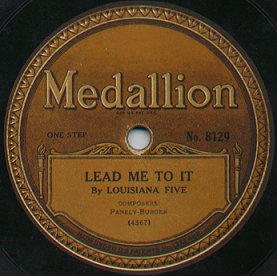
1919 Medallion record by the Louisiana Five

Medallion Records was a record label (1919 – late 1921 or early 1922) owned by the Baldwin Piano Corporation of Cincinnati, Ohio.

Most Medallion issues were pressed from masters leased from Emerson Records, whose catalogue included early jazz recordings by the Louisiana Five and Eubie Blake.

== Kapp Medallion ==
At least four LPs were issued in the 1960s on the Kapp Medallion label. Kapp Records, Inc., was a firm in New York City that had no association with the original Medallion label.

== See also ==
- List of record labels
