= Louisiana Five =

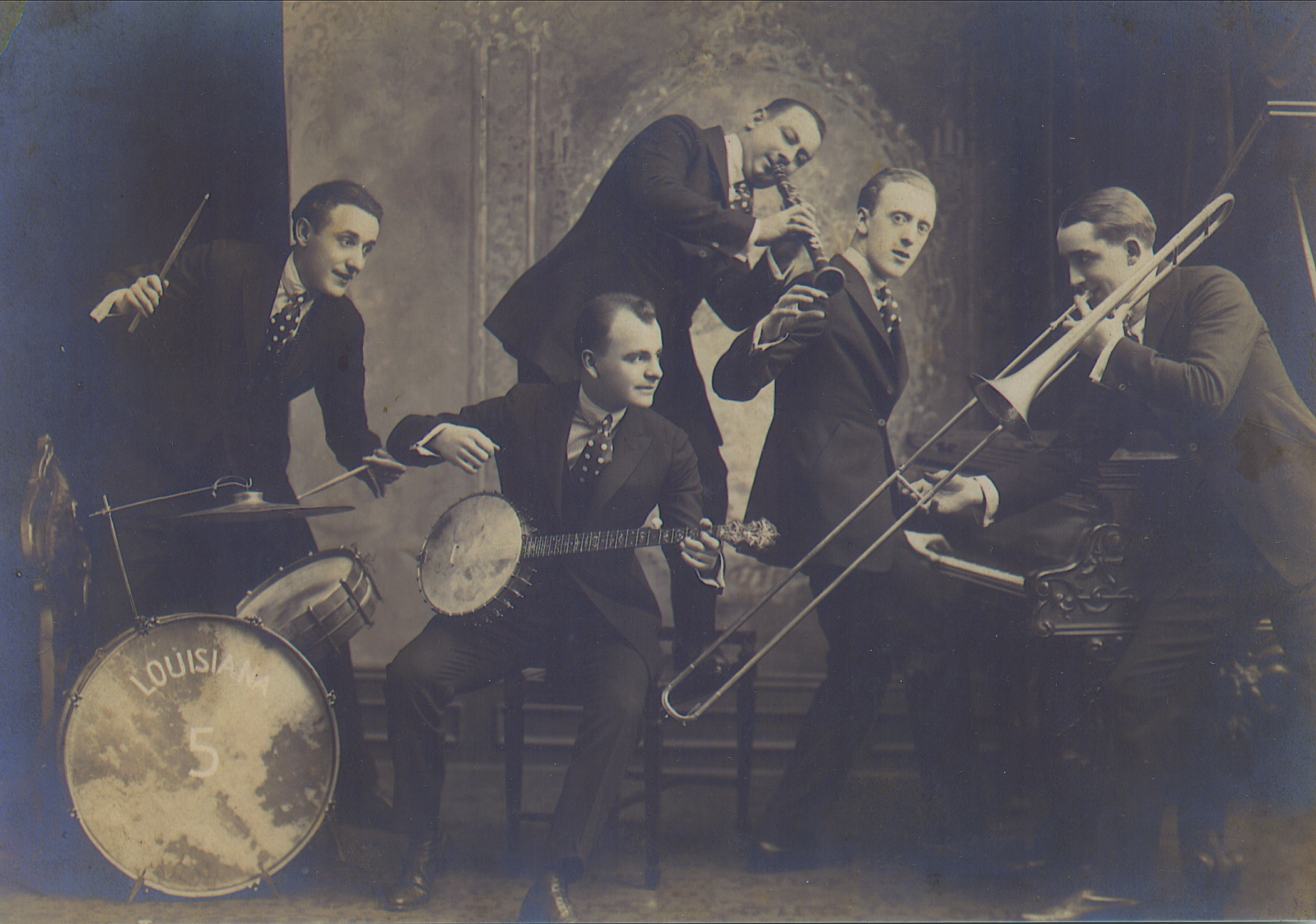
- Left to right: Anton Lada, Karl Berger, Yellow Nunez, Joe Cawley, Charles Panelli

Background information
- Origin: New Orleans
- Genres: Dixieland
- Years active: 1917–1920
- Labels: Emerson, Edison, Columbia
- Members: Anton Lada, Karl Berger, Yellow Nunez, Joe Cawley, Charles Panelli

The Louisiana Five was an early Dixieland jazz band that was active from 1917 to 1920. It was among the earliest jazz groups to record extensively. The Louisiana Five was led by drummer Anton Lada.

== History ==
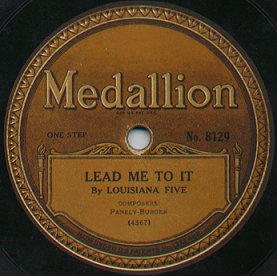
1919 Medallion disc by the Louisiana Five

The Louisiana Five was formed in New York City. Lada recruited the other four members, the pianist Joe Cawley, trombonist Charlie Panelli (often spelled "Panely" in contemporary material) and banjo player Karl Berger. The clarinetist Alcide "Yellow" Nunez was with the Louisiana Five (1918–19).

The band recorded extensively for various companies including Emerson Records, whose catalogue was leased to Medallion Records, Columbia Records and Edison Records, and went on to produce such hits as "Clarinet Squawk" and "Slow and Easy". On one recording session they were joined by the multi-instrumentalist Bernard "Doc" Beherendson on cornet.

The band was popular in the New York City area in 1919 and made tours of Texas and Oklahoma.

Yelping Hound Blues
A 1920 recording of Yelping Hound Blues

After Nunez left the band, the group made one more pair of recordings in 1920 with a violin replacing the clarinet.

== Discography ==
- After All (1919)
- A Good Man Is Hard to Find (1918)
- Alcoholic Blues (1919)
- B-Hap-E (1919)
- Big Fat Ma (1919)
- Blues My Naughty Sweetie Gives to Me (1919)
- Church Street Sobbin Blues (1919)
- Clarinet Squawk (1919)
- Dixie Blues (1919)
- Down Where the Rajahs Dwell (1919)
- Foot Warmer (1919)
- Golden Rod (1919)
- Heart Sickness Blues (1918)
- Hello, Hello (1919)
- High Brown Babies' Ball (1919)
- I Ain't 'En Got 'Er No Time to Have the Blues (1919)
- I'll Get Him Yet (1920)
- Just Another Good Man Gone Wrong (1919)
- Laughing Blues (1918)
- Land of Creole Girls (1920)
- Lead Me to It (1919)
- Oh Joe, Get Your Fiddle and Your Bow (1920)
- Orange Blossom Rag (1919)
- Rainy Day Blues (1919)
- Ringtail Blues (1919)
- Slow and Easy (1919)
- Summer Days (1919)
- Sunshine Girl (1920)
- That Shanghai Melody (1919)
- Town Topic Rag (1919)
- Thunderbolt (1919)
- Virginia Blues (1919)
- Weary Blues (1919)
- Weeping Willow Blues (1920)
- Yama Yama Blues (1919)
- Yelping Hound Blues (1919)
- You Can't Get Lovin' Where There Ain't Any Love (1919)

== Sources ==
"Louisiana Five" with audio samples Red Hot Jazz Archive
