= Fisher Electronics =

Brand of audio equipment

Fisher Electronics Sanyo Fisher
- Type: Corporation
- Industry: Electronics
- Founded: 1945 in New York City
- Defunct: 2000 in New York City
- Fate: Acquired by Sanyo Electric
- Products: Audio-Visual and communication equipment, Hi-fi equipment, Home appliances

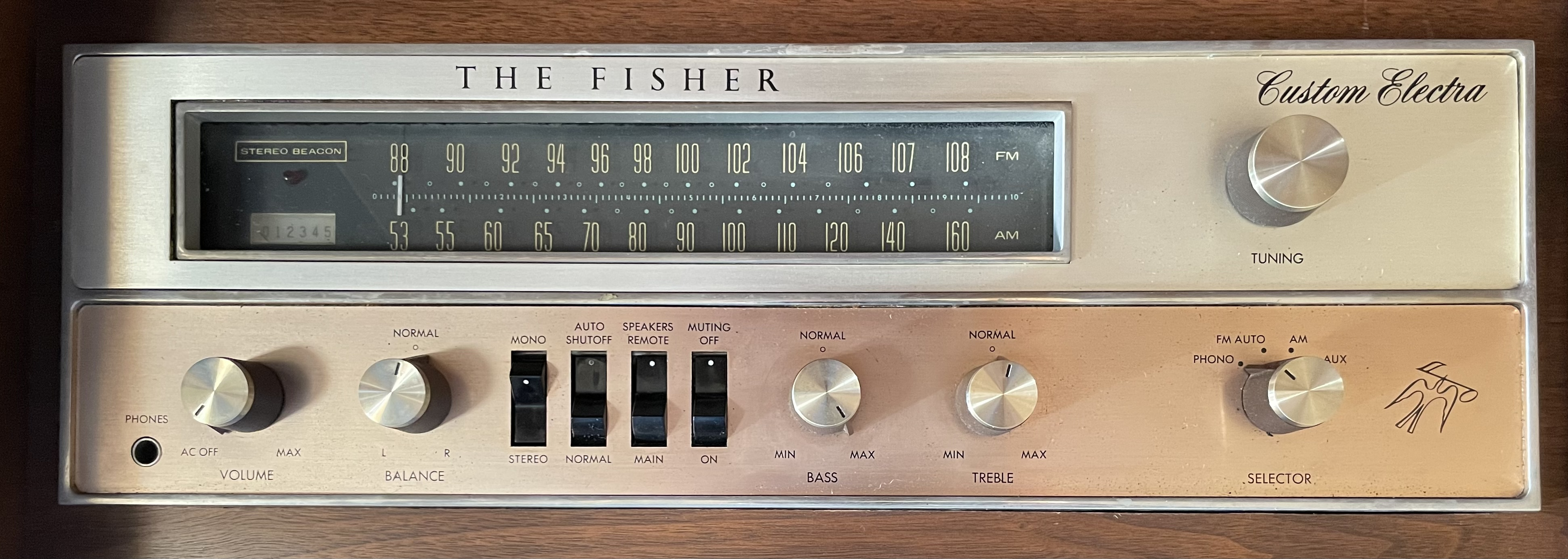

Fisher Electronics was an American company specialising in the field of hi-fi electronics. The company and the name was bought by Japanese electronics conglomerate Sanyo in 1975.

== History ==
Fisher Electronics was an American audio equipment manufacturer founded in 1945 by Avery Fisher in New York City, New York. Originally named the Fisher Radio Corporation, the company is considered a pioneer in high fidelity audio equipment. Fisher initially developed, manufactured and marketed high-performance audio products under the trade name "The Fisher".

In February 1969, Emerson Electric announced plans to purchase Fisher Radio. To purchase Fisher, Emerson initially agreed to exchange 736,000 shares in a transaction worth approximately $75 million. Emerson later agreed to pay approximately $37 million in stock to acquire Fisher. The purchase was completed later that year. Emerson subsequently sold Fisher to Sanyo Electric of Japan in 1975. In 2000, Fisher's entire product lineup was re-branded as Sanyo. Upon the acquisition of Sanyo by Panasonic in 2011, Sanyo's product lineup was, in turn, re-branded as Panasonic. Avery Fisher remained as a consultant for Emerson and Sanyo.

Fisher is generally known to be the first company to introduce separate audio components. Originally, hi-fi systems were integrated all into one chassis.

== The Fisher ==
The Fisher was the brand name for high-end, high quality hi-fi electronic equipment manufactured in New York by The Fisher Radio Corp. during the "golden age" of the vacuum tube, which was named after the company founder, Avery Fisher.

During this period, similar brands were H.H. Scott, Marantz, Harman Kardon, and McIntosh. Some of the early 1960s models were also available as kits. Fisher tube equipment is considered quite collectible today.

Fisher's first receiver was the model 500, a mono AM/FM receiver using two EL37 output tubes. It had a brass-plated face panel and an optional mahogany or "blonde" wooden case. This early mono receiver should not be confused with the later stereo tube receiver models, the 500B and 500C. These later receivers made in the early 1960s were stereo using push-pull 7591 output tubes. They were also sold with optional wood cabinets and had aluminum faceplates instead of the brass on the earlier 500 receiver.

Well-known models include (but are not limited to):

- FM-1000/FMR-1 Broadcast Monitor Tuner, considered one of the best tube tuners, collectible
- FM-200-B Tuner – similar to FM-1000 above, but for home use
- FM-100-B Tuner
- 800 Series Receiver A, B, C, AM/FM, 7591A outputs
- 500 Series Receiver A, B, C, FM only, 7591A outputs
- 400 Series Receiver, FM only, 7868 outputs, similar to model 500, but with fewer features
- X-1000 Series Integrated Amplifier
- X-200 Series Integrated Amplifier
- X-100 Series Integrated Amplifier

The Fisher was also used on Fisher's early US made solid-state equipment, such as the model 210 receiver.

Fisher FM tuners and receivers often used similar designs and components thus allowing parts to be swapped between various models. A good example is the FM stereo multiplex decoder module.

Fisher was the first to introduce stereo receivers with four channels. These innovations were brief and occurred in the mid-1970s which some consider The Second Golden Age of High Fidelity. Like many new concepts of the time such as Beta Format and VHS, there were a number of competing four channel formats. One was CD-4 (by JVC) and the others were SQ, QS and UD-4. None were particularly successful due to higher hardware costs, incompatibilities between formats and that some purists thought that "four channel" was a fad, which it proved to be.

At the time the concept of a sub-woofer was in its infancy. Now, it is common to see 5+1 systems which had their heritage in the "confrontation" of four-channel and stereo high fidelity coupled with a sub woofer.

=== Other consumer products ===
Under Sanyo ownership, Fisher also commercialized a range of consumer products including

- television sets, HiFi VHS recorders, projectors and DVD players, digicams and surveillance equipment
- audio systems and dictation machines, mobile devices and phones
- household machinery and air conditioners

In particular, the air conditioning business of Sanyo and Fisher brands was unified in 2000 under the Sanyo Electric Air Conditioning Co. Ltd. scheme, to end up eventually in 2011 with the buyout from Panasonic.

== Photo gallery ==
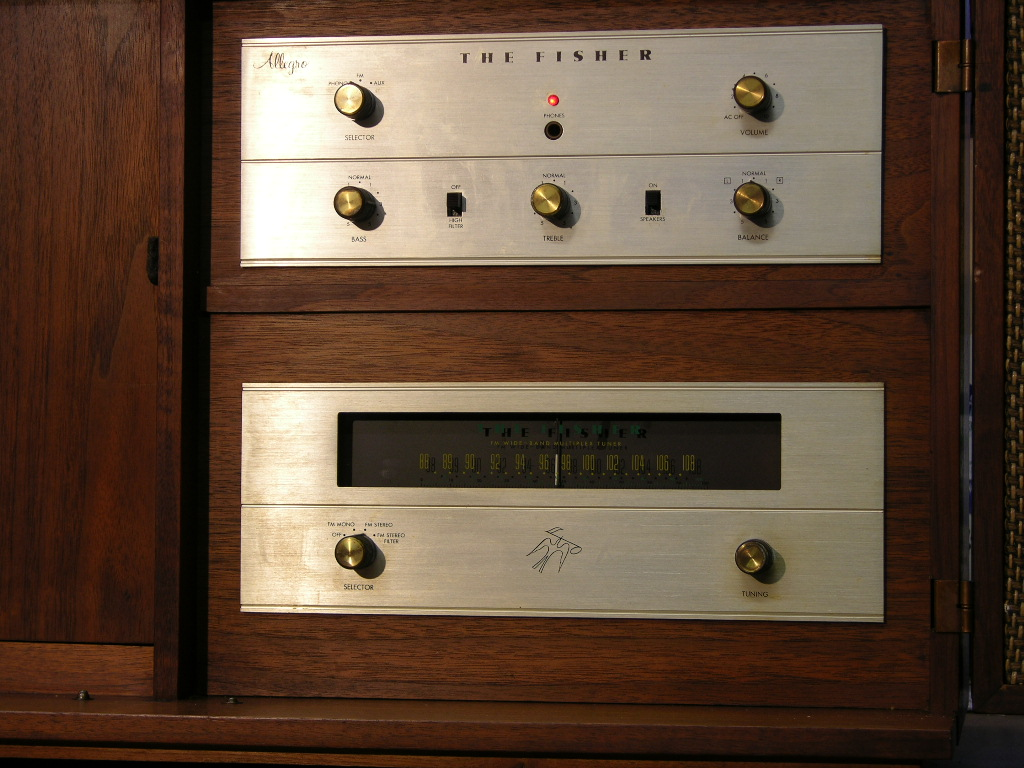
Fisher Allegro Model X19 Tube 20 watt stereo amplifier and matching FM Multiplex Tuner, c. 1962

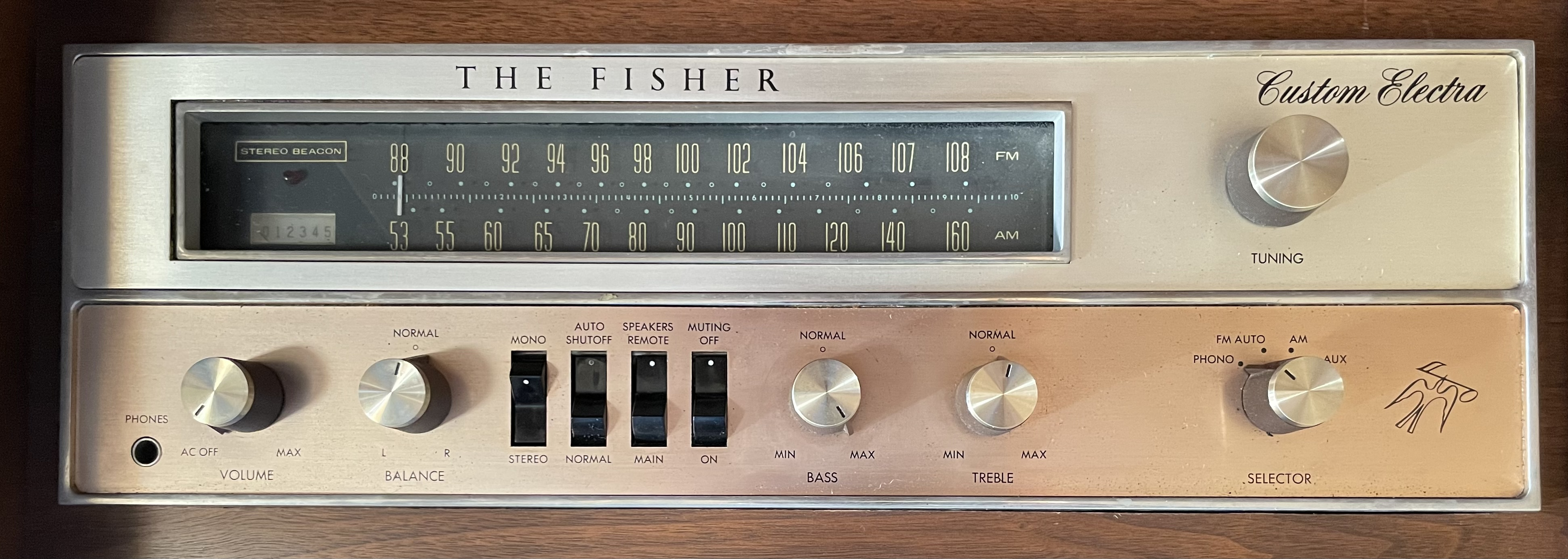
Fisher Custom Electra Console – 1967 – Model E-492-W – 21-R Solid State Chassis – 45 Watts – Made in US – Turn Table: Dual 1010 (W. Germany).

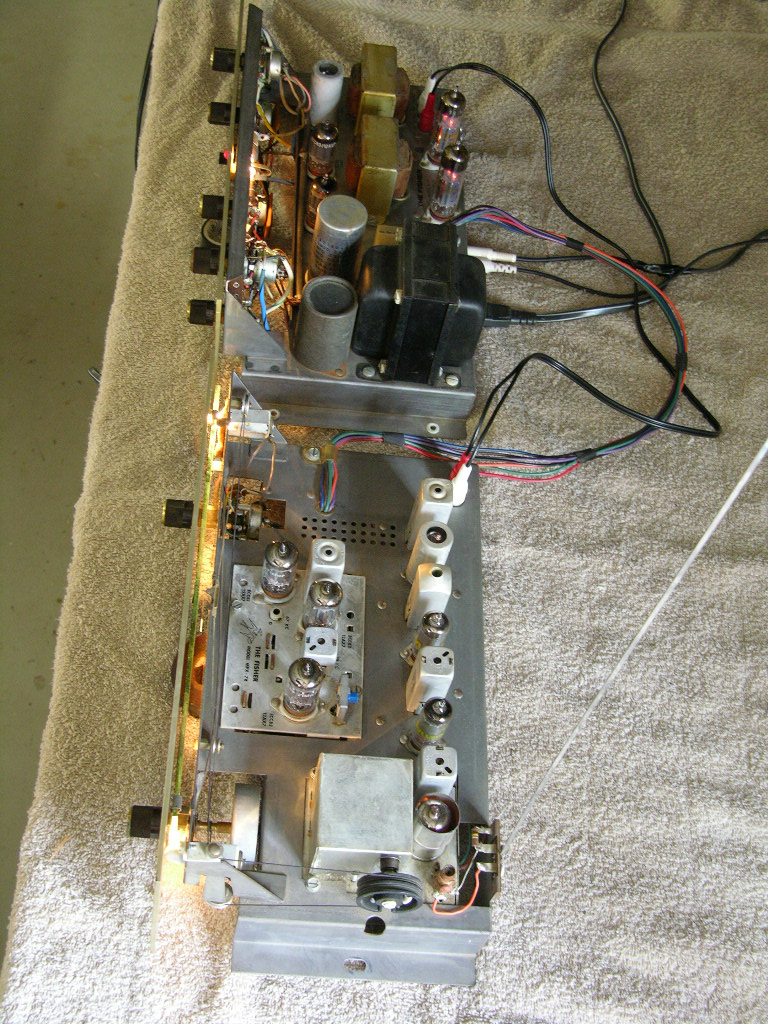
Fisher Allegro A19 Tube Tuner and Model X19 Amplifier as removed from "portable console"

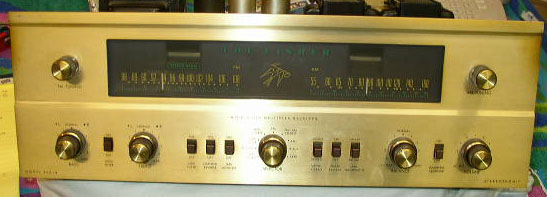
Circa 1962 Fisher Model 800B AM/FM Tube Stereo Receiver 32 watts per channel

Fisher 800B Tube Stereo Receiver

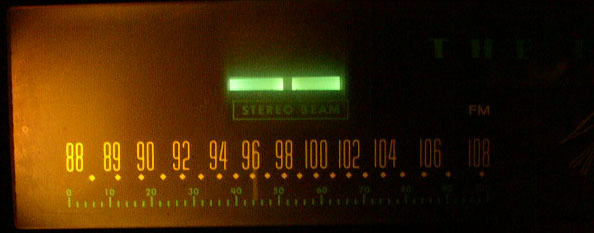
Fisher often used the Tuning Eye or "Stereo Beam" and "Stereo Beacon" as shown on the Model 800B

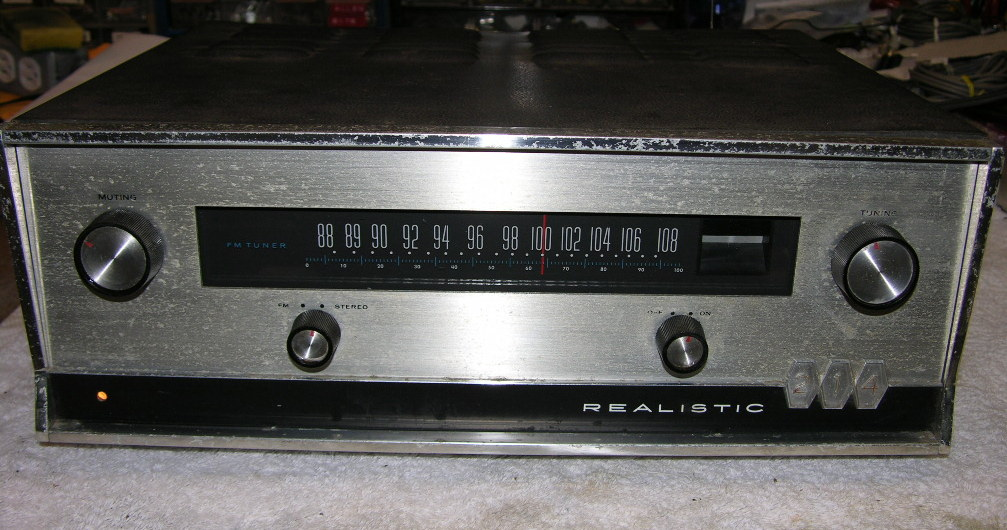
Extremely rare Model 214 FM Multiplex Tube Tuner made by Fisher and sold with Realistic badging through RadioShack stores c. 1962

Fisher MC-3010 Integrated Component System (Receiver and 8-Track Player/Recorder Combo c. 1975)

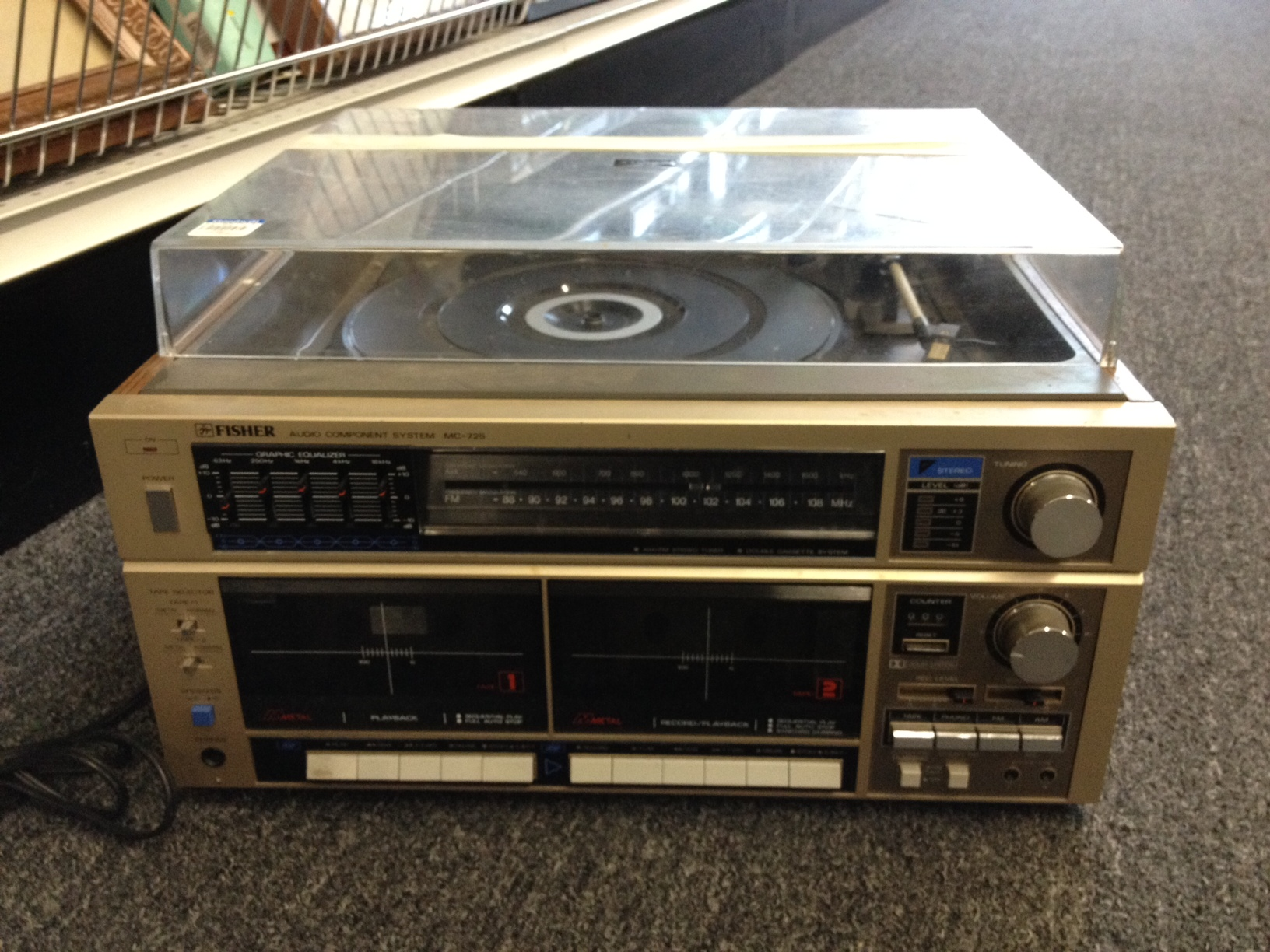
A Fisher Electronics record player and tape deck, without speakers

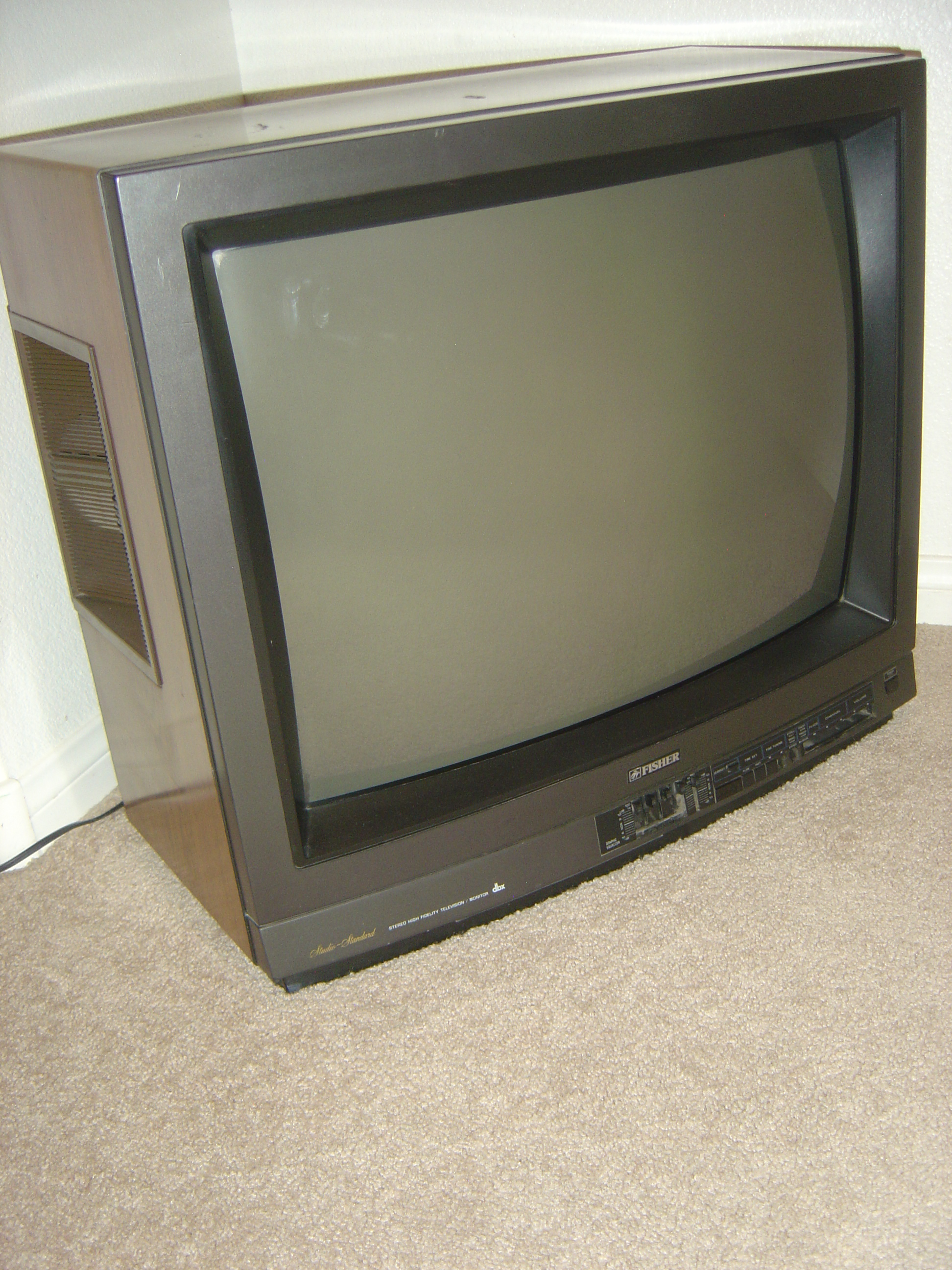
Fisher PC-367WS television set, manufactured 1987
