= Benjamin Abrams =

American businessman

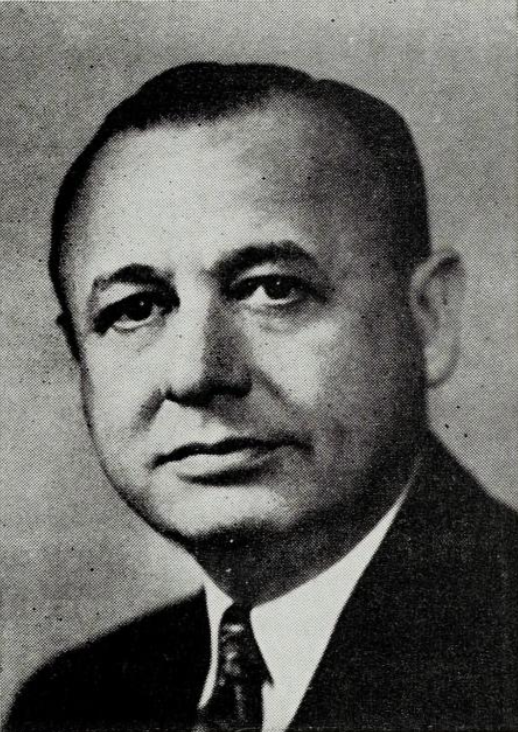
- Born: August 18, 1893; Dorohoi, Romania
- Died: June 23, 1967 (aged 73); White Plains, Westchester County, New York, USA
- Burial place: Mount Carmel Cemetery (Queens)
- Spouse: Elizabeth Kramer
- Family: Nelson Peltz (son-in-law)

Benjamin Abrams (August 18, 1893 – June 23, 1967) was an American businessman and a founder of Emerson Radio & Phonograph Corporation after his purchase of Emerson Records in 1922. Along with his brothers he invented a number of devices that are commonplace today, among them midget transistor radios, self-powered radios, and clock radios.

== Biography ==
He was born in Dorohoi, Romania and emigrated with his parents to the United States when he was 12.

He was a prominent donor to Jewish cause. He was a founder of the Albert Einstein College of Medicine of Yeshiva University, a founder of the Greater New York Committee for Israel Bonds, and a founder and board member of the Federation of Jewish Philanthropies of Greater New York. He served as a member of the board of directors of the United Jewish Appeal, the Weizmann Institute, the Hebrew University in Jerusalem, the American Financial and Development Corporation for Israel, and the American Friends of the Hebrew University. In 1954, he funded the electronic laboratory at the Weizmann Institute at Rehovot which was named in his honor.

Abrams was a Freemason. He was a member of Farragut Lodge No 976 in New York.

He was married to Elizabeth Kramer. In 1964, his daughter Cynthia Abrams married businessman Nelson Peltz; they divorced in 1981.
