= Sally Hamlin =

American actress

Sally Emery Hamlin
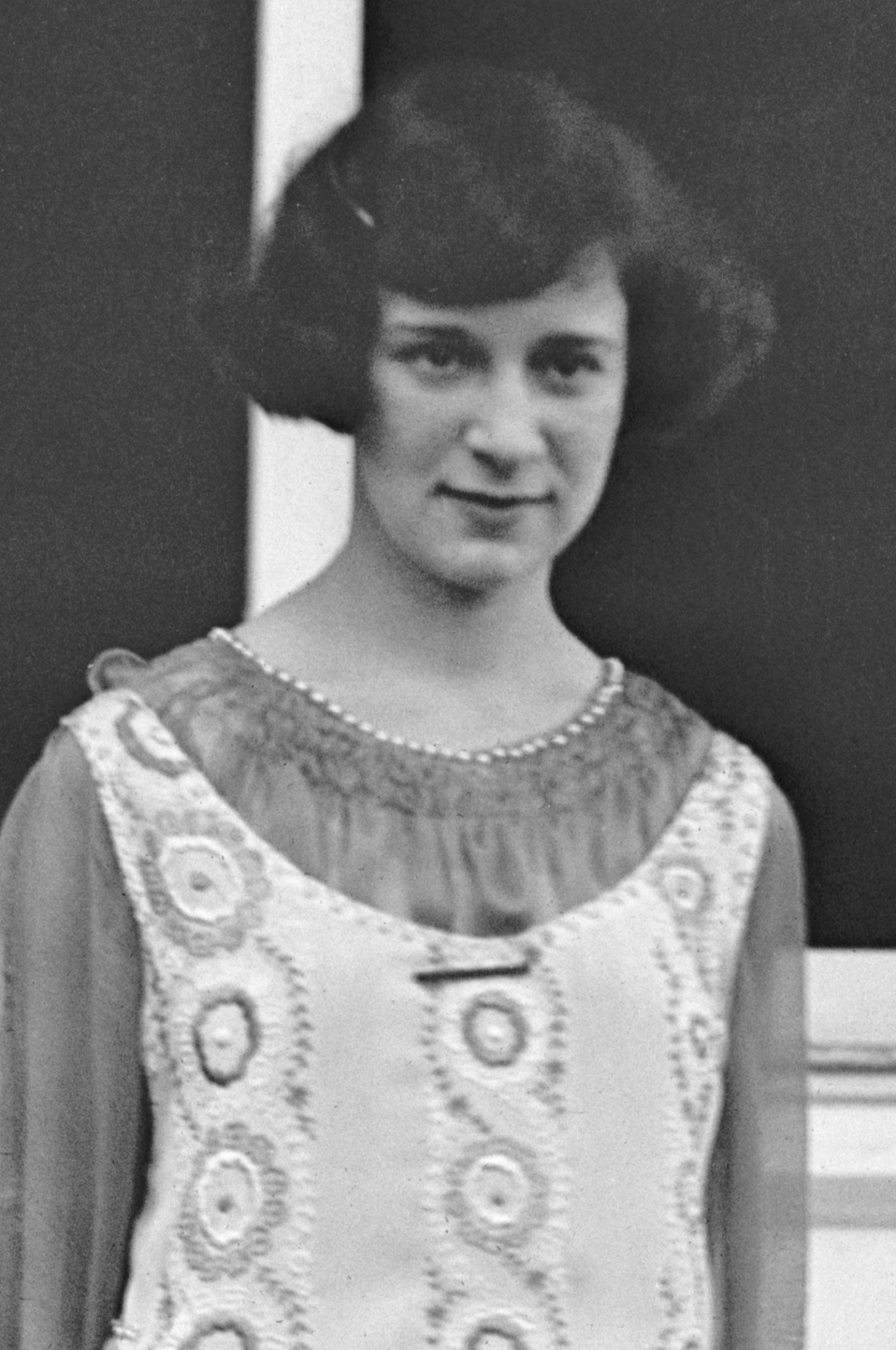
- Hamlin in 1922
- Born: December 23, 1902
- Died: July 4, 1987 (aged 84); Bar Harbor, Maine

Sally Emery Hamlin (December 23, 1902 – July 4, 1987) was an American child actor, pianist, and recording artist.

== Biography ==
She was the daughter of Dr. Cyrus E. Hamlin and Hattie Bennion; also the great-granddaughter of former U.S. Vice President Hannibal Hamlin. She is a shadowy figure today, and would probably be completely forgotten were it not for a series of 78 rpm spoken word recordings she made for children in the 1910s and 1920s. Sally recorded primarily for the Victor Talking Machine Company, but also recorded a few 7" discs for Emerson Records and at least one disc for Aeolian Vocalion. These records were readings of poetry by such authors as Eugene Field and James Whitcomb Riley, classic stories such as Cinderella and Rumpelstilskin, and even excerpts from Pollyanna by Eleanor H. Porter. Sally also recorded piano rolls for Duo-Art and a piano solo "The Butterfly", for Victor, which was never issued.

Sally Hamlin was fifteen years old when she signed a one-year contract with Victor on April 12, 1917, and made the trip from her home at 7 Woodruff Avenue, in Brooklyn, New York to Victor's recording studios in Camden, New Jersey. During this period, her most popular records were made. Sally delivered James Whitcomb Riley's dialect poems "The Raggedy Man" and "Our Hired Girl" with natural girlish charm and they were instant successes. Her recordings of Eugene Field's "Wynken, Blynken, and Nod" and "The Sugar Plum Tree" are notable for Sally's use of sprechstimme, particularly in the final stanzas which are accompanied by harpist Francis J. Lapitino. This dreamy half spoken, half sung performance is one of the earliest examples of sprechstimme in a commercial recording.

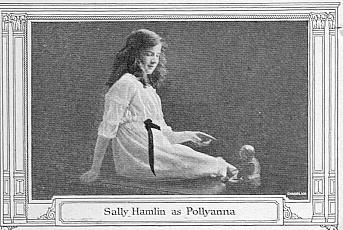
Sally Hamlin, from the 1917 Victor record catalog

On June 25, 1925 Sally married James Tinker Denton, a widower, in Manhattan. Sally became a step mother to Arthur Shaw Denton, James Thomas Denton and Florence Ann Denton. Sally and James T. had a child of their own Martha Louise Denton who was born in January of 1927. James T. died 15 October 1950 in New York State. On November 1, 1926, Sally Hamlin signed another contract with Victor, this one for a two-year period. While her earlier recordings had been made by the acoustic recording process, this group was recorded using the new electrical process, introduced in early 1925. Victor had her re-record some of her previous readings utilizing the new electrical process, and recorded some new titles such as "The Little Kitten That Would Not Wash Its Face" and Lewis Carroll's Jabberwocky. Among this group is her record of "The Night Before Christmas" and "The Shoemaker And The Elves". This record contains perhaps the first instance of sampling in a commercial recording. Sally's recordings of these two famous Christmas pieces contain musical fade-ins from other records in Victor's catalog (among them, Elsie Baker's record of "Silent Night"). Although it was surely done as a cost-cutting measure, being cheaper than hiring an orchestra or a pianist, it nevertheless is sampling by definition. None of Sally Hamlin's work has ever been officially reissued commercially on LP or compact disc.

Later in life, Sally Hamlin married Karl M. Chworowsky, a minister of the Unitarian Church. They were both accomplished pianists who gave recitals together. She outlived him by 23 years, dying at the age of 84 in Bar Harbor, Maine. She is buried in the Hamlin family plot at Mount Hope Cemetery in Bangor, Maine.

== Discography ==
- Abou Ben Adhem/The Arrow And The Song (Victor 21823-B; 1929)
- Butterfly, The (piano solo, unreleased; 1918)
- Cinderella, Parts I and II (Victor 21697; 1928)
- Cinderella/Jack and the Beanstalk (Victor 35664; 1917)
- Duel, The/Three Bears (Emerson 7116; 1917)
- Envy (unreleased; 1917)
- Hansel and Gretel, Parts I and II (unreleased; 1917)
- It Can't Be Done (unreleased; 1917)
- Jabberwocky/The Walrus And The Carpenter (Victor 21826; 1929)
- Jack and the Beanstalk, Parts I and II (Victor 21696; 1928)
- Little Dog That Would Not Wag Its Tail, Parts I and II (Victor 21699; 1928)
- Little Engine That Could/Dear Little Hen (Victor 21824; 1929)
- Little Kitten That Would Not Wash Its Face, Parts I and II (Victor 21698; 1928)
- Little Orphant Annie/Seein' Things At Night (Victor 18381; 1917)
- Mother Goose Medley/Rumpelstilskin (Emerson 7125; 1917)
- Night Before Christmas/Shoemaker and the Elves (Aeolian Vocalion 12058; 1919)
- Night Before Christmas/Shoemaker and the Elves (Victor 35939; 1928)
- Night Wind, The (unreleased; 1918)
- Old Woman And Her Pig (unreleased; 1928)
- Pollyanna and The Boy/Pollyanna Arrives (Victor 35652; 1917)
- Raggedy Man/Winkin,(sic) Blynken & Nod (Emerson 794; 1916)
- Rumpelstilskin, Parts I and II (Victor 20341; 1926)
- Teeny Tiny (unreleased; 1928)
- Three Little Kittens/There Was An Old Man/One Misty Moisty Morning (unreleased; 1917)
- The Three Little Pigs/The Duel (Victor 18685; 1920)
- Raggedy Man/Our Hired Girl (Victor 18276; 1917) (Victor 20339; 1926)
- Wynken, Blynken, and Nod/Sugar Plum Tree (Victor 18599; 1919) (Victor 20340; 1926)
- Year's At The Spring/What Is So Rare As A Day In June (Victor 21823; 1929)

== Sources ==
- Almost Complete 78 RPM Record Dating Guide by Stephen C. Barr; Yesterday Once Again, 1992
- Letter from Ann McDonald, librarian, Hamlin Memorial Library dated Aug. 12, 1999
- Letter from Bernadette Moore, Archivist, BMG Music dated May 12, 1989
- Letter from Morton J. Savada, Records Revisited, NYC dated June 21, 1989
- Life And Times of Hannibal Hamlin by Charles Eugene Hamlin; Cambridge/Riverside Press 1899
- Rev. Chworowsky Resigns Unitarian Ministry Bridgeport Connecticut Sunday Herald, May 4, 1958
- Victor Records Catalogs 1917-1922
- Victor Records October 1917 supplement (photo)
- Victor Talking Machine Company Recording Logs 1917-1928
- Victrola In Rural Schools; Educational Department, Victor Talking Machine Co. 1921 Edition.
