= Orion Electric =

Japanese consumer electronics company

Orion Co., Ltd.

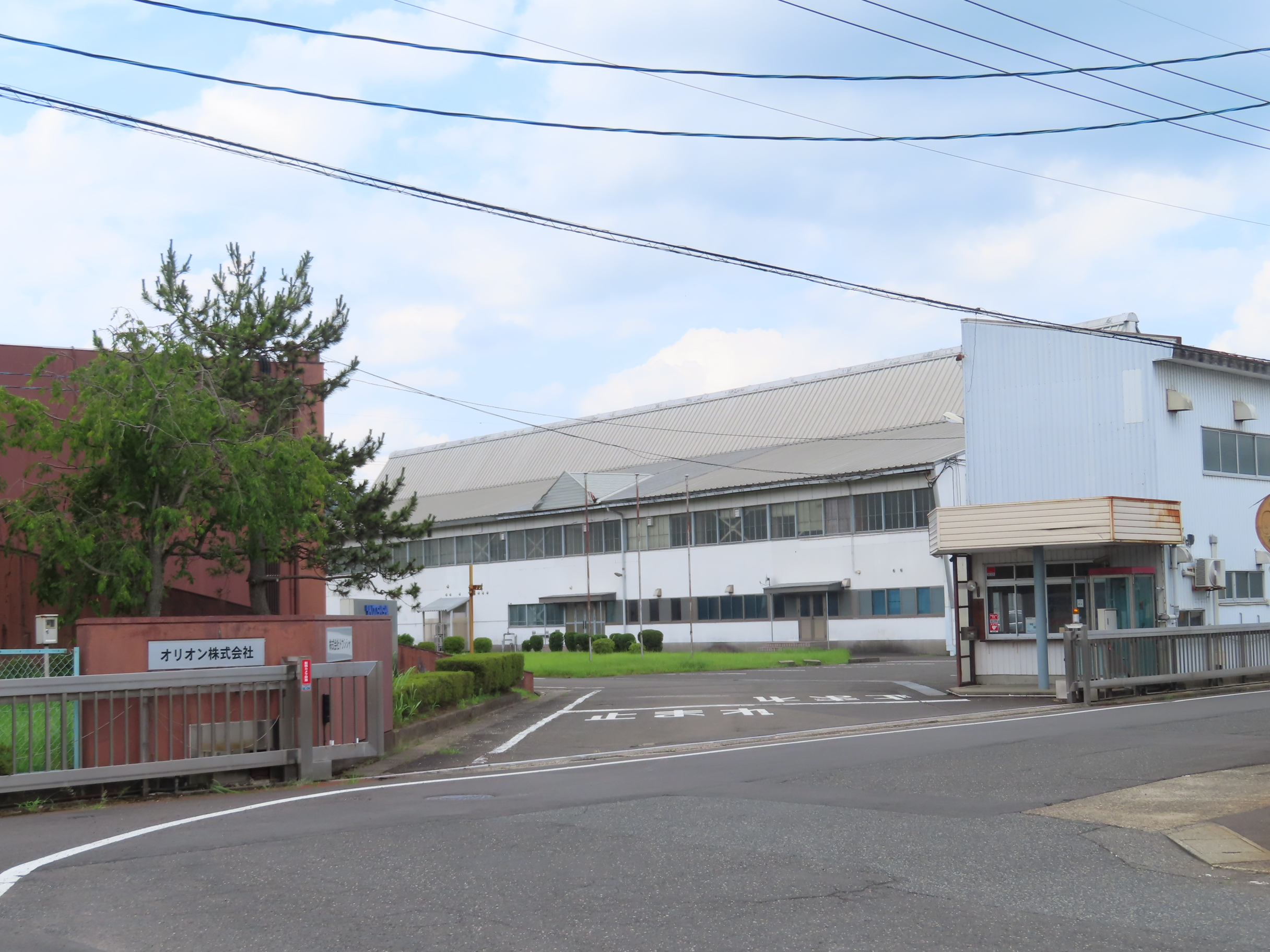
- Site of former headquarters in Echizen, Fukui
- Native name: オリオン電機株式会社
- Type: Public
- Founded: 1958; 68 years ago in Osaka, Japan
- Founder: Shigemasa Otake
- Defunct: 2019; 7 years ago
- Fate: Acquired by Doshisha Corporation
- Headquarters: Echizen, Fukui, Japan

Orion Co., Ltd. (オリオン電機株式会社, Orion Denki Kabushiki-gaisha) was a Japanese consumer electronics company that was established in 1958 in Osaka, Japan. Their devices were branded as "Orion".

== History ==
Orion Co., Ltd. was founded as Orion Electric Co., Ltd. in 1958 in Osaka, Japan, by Shigemasa Otake. The company initially produced transistor radios, audiocassette recorders, and CB radio transceivers. Later audio products included 8-track players, car stereos, and home stereo systems.

From 1984 to their acquisition, their headquarters were based in Echizen, Fukui, Japan. Before their acquisition, they were of the world's largest OEM television and video equipment manufacturers, primarily supplying major-brand OEM customers, with Toshiba being its major customer in the 2000s. Orion produced around six million TV sets and twelve million DVD player and TV set combo units each year until 2019.

The Orion Group employed in excess of 9,000 workers. They had factories and offices in Japan, Thailand, Poland (as Otake), the United Kingdom, and the United States. Orion's flagship factories in Thailand were one of Thailand's top exporters.

Orion manufactured products primarily for Emerson, Memorex, Hitachi, JVC, and Sansui. In the North American market, Orion manufactured many TV sets and VCRs for Emerson Radio during the 1980s and 1990s, but when Emerson Radio filed for bankruptcy in 2000, rights to the Emerson brand were sold to Orion's primary competitor, Funai, for use in home video equipment. During the 1990s, Orion and another of their brand names, World, were exclusively sold by Wal-Mart. The products sold consisted of discounted TV sets, TV/VCR combos, and VHS players. In 2001, at its peak, Orion partnered with Toshiba and Sumitomo to manufacture smaller CRT and LCD televisions, combo televisions, and DVD/VCR combos in Thailand for the North American market, until 2009. After Toshiba exited, Orion production numbers had dropped significantly by more than 90% and ran into financially trouble, and most workers were laid off after 2010.

In 2011, Orion licensed the JVC name for TV sets. Until 2019, all JVC TV sets were designed, produced, and supported by Orion. Orion also manufactured OEM TV sets for Hitachi. Most of these TVs were sold at Wal-Mart and Sam's Club stores. Orion also operated Orion Sales, headquartered in Olney, Illinois, for the North American market, using their privately owned Sansui brand, and their recently licensed JVC television brand. Due to declining sales, Orion Sales ceased to exist in 2016, and was sold to Elitelux Technologies.

On March 31, 2015, Orion Electric Co., Ltd. had reached insolvency and appointed provisional liquidators, due to poor sales by severe low price competition worldwide. However, on April 1, 2015, the "new" Orion Electric Co., Ltd. was established, and took over previous Orion Electric business. On January 19, 2019, Orion Co., Ltd., a subsidiary of the Doshisha Corporation in Osaka, took over the Orion brands and businesses. On May 20, 2019, Orion Electric Co., Ltd. had once again reached insolvency. Due to the lack of continuing funds, the Orion Electric Co., Ltd. ceased to exist, with all assets and holdings presumably owned by the Doshisha Corporation.

In 2026, the Orion brand is revived by Doshisha Corporation to become its new private electronic goods brand sold in Japan.
