= Emerson Radio =

US consumer electronics distributor

Emerson Radio Corporation
- Logo used since 2005
- Type: Public
- Traded as: AMEX: MSN; Russell Microcap Index component
- Industry: Wholesaler
- Founded: 1948; 78 years ago
- Headquarters: Parsippany, New Jersey, U.S.
- Key people: Mike Binney (CEO)
- Products: Consumer Electronics
- Revenue: ▼US$6.31 million (2026)
- Net income: ▲ −US$4.30 million (2026)
- Number of employees: 115
- Website: emersonradio.com

Emerson Radio Corporation is one of the United States' largest volume consumer electronics distributors and has a recognized trademark in continuous use since 1912. The company designs, markets, and licenses many product lines worldwide, including products sold, and sometimes licensed, under the brand name G Clef, an homage to Emerson's logo.

== History ==
=== 1915–1920 ===
Emerson Radio Corp. was incorporated in 1915 as Emerson Phonograph Co. (NAICS: 421620 Consumer Electronics Wholesaling), based in New York City, by an early recording engineer and executive, Victor Hugo Emerson, who was at one time employed by Columbia Records. The first factories were opened in Chicago and Boston in 1920. In December of that year, the company fell victim to the sales slump which affected the entire phonograph industry caused by the post-World War I recession and the growth of the rapidly expanding commercial radio industry in the early 1920s. The company quickly went from the self-claimed third largest US record manufacturer into receivership.

=== 1921–1940 ===
In 1922 Emerson Phonograph Co. passed into the hands of Benjamin Abrams and Rudolph Kanarak. Abrams, a phonograph and record salesman, along with his two brothers, ran the company and renamed it Emerson Radio & Phonograph Corp in 1924 after entering the radio business. The company's phonograph record interests were subsequently sold. Although Emerson introduced the first radio-phonograph combination sold in the United States, the company remained relatively obscure until 1932, when, during the Great Depression, it introduced the "peewee" radio (see "Historical Products" below).

=== 1941–1950 ===
Emerson Radio & Phonograph converted to military production for World War II in 1942, when it held one-sixth of the U.S. radio market. In 1943, it became a public corporation, when it offered over 40 percent of its stock to the public for $12 a share. In 1947, among its first post-war products, Emerson offered a television set with a 10-inch tube. Although its ending retail price was nearly equal to a month's salary for the average working American, it put Emerson at the lower end of the market. However, between fiscal 1948 and 1950, the high demand for television allowed Emerson to more than double its sales. Its net income reached a record of $6.5 million in fiscal 1950, with sales of $74.2 million.

=== 1951–1960 ===
In 1953 Emerson Radio and Phonograph purchased Quiet Heet Corp., which entered the company into air conditioning. Although radio represented only 15 percent of Emerson's revenue by 1954, the company credited itself as creating the firsts of the clock radio, self-powered radio, and transistorized pocket radio; production of tape recorders began in 1955.

Emerson Radio and Phonograph paid $6 million to purchase the consumer products division of DuMont Laboratories in 1958. With this acquisition, a higher-priced line of television sets, phonographs and high-fidelity and stereo instruments, along with the DuMont trademark was added to Emerson's products. However, by this time, the US television market was saturated, and many customers who were in need of another set were waiting for color television instead of buying a replacement. Sales fell from $87.4 million in fiscal 1955 to $73.9 million in fiscal 1956, when the company earned only $84,852.

A cost-cutting campaign by Abrams rebounded net income which reached $2.7 million in fiscal 1959 on sales of $67.4 million. In fiscal 1964 (Emerson's last full year of independent operation) it earned $2.1 million on sales of $68.2 million.

=== 1961–1980 ===
In 1965 the company acquired the Pilot Radio Corp. from Jerrold Corp. Later in 1965 Emerson Radio and Phonograph was purchased for approximately $62 million in cash and stock by National Union Electric Corporation, a diversified manufacturer. Its line of Quiet Kool air conditioners became a separate National Union Electric division. This company continued to produce radios, television sets and phonographs distributed under the Emerson and DuMont names and hi-fi equipment under the Pilot name. In addition, in 1966 it strengthened its position in the integrated electrical installation field upon acquiring Electro-Air Cleaner Company of McKees Rocks, Pennsylvania; a firm producing a line of electronic air cleaning units.

Between 1967 and 1971 the National Union Electric division lost about $27 million due to too little volume to cover costs. The division contracted out the manufacturing of television sets and some other home entertainment products to Admiral Corp., and laid off 1,800 employees. In addition to importing some of its home entertainment products from the Far East, Emerson continued to be responsible for design, engineering, and marketing.

In late 1972 National Union Electric announced that Emerson was discontinuing distribution of television sets and other home entertainment products. In 1973 Emerson sold its license for marketing products under the Emerson name to Major Electronics Corp. Founded in 1948 by Melvin Lane and incorporated in 1956, this Brooklyn-based company originally made children's phonographs. The company later diversified into the production and sale of a broad line of low-priced home entertainment products that included stereos, radios, and clock radios. In 1971 Major also began importing low-cost radios. By 1975 the company was only manufacturing portable phonographs. In 1976 the company moved its headquarters to Secaucus, New Jersey, and changed its name to Emerson Radio Corp. in 1977.

Sales rose from $11.5 million in fiscal 1975 to $49.2 million in fiscal 1978, the year in which phonographs, radios, tape recorders and players, compact stereos, digital clock radios, and other low to medium-priced electronic equipment was being imported, assembled, and marketed, primarily under the Emerson name. Approximately 60 percent of its components were being imported from the Far East and 20 percent from each Great Britain and domestically, and assembled in either Secaucus or Sun Valley, California.

In 1979, Emerson began selling Heart Aid, after purchasing a large portion of Cardiac Resuscitator Corp., a near-bankrupt company. Emerson spent heavily to develop and produce both an improved Implantable cardioverter-defibrillator and a pacemaker. In addition, the company took an 18 percent share in a developer of computerized axial tomographic (CAT) scanners. Because this line of products never made money, Emerson disposed of its holdings in them between 1987 and 1988.

Emerson Radio dropped its last U.S.-made product, the phonograph line, in 1980 because it became unprofitable due to rising labor costs. Despite harsh competition, Emerson Radio raised its sales and earnings in fiscal 1980 to $81.9 million and $1.6 million, respectively. Their plan was to have their suppliers (mainly in Taiwan and South Korea) imitate Sony and Panasonic audio/video products and then sell them at a lower price.

=== 1981–1990 ===
Sales increased from $94.8 million in fiscal 1983 to $181.6 million in fiscal 1984, when net income came to $9.1 million because of the company's reintroduction of television sets in 1983. Emerson purchased sets from Goldstar Electric Co. (AKA LG Electronics), a South Korean company, but sold them at a higher price point.

In 1984, Emerson signed a 10-year contract with Orion Electric to produce a line of VCRs to its existing product lineup.

In 1985, a compact disc player and microwave oven were introduced causing sales to once again double in fiscal 1985 to $357.5 million, and net income rose to $13.3 million. TV sets and VCRs accounted for two-thirds of sales that year. Later that year, Emerson Radio moved its headquarters to North Bergen, New Jersey, and acquired H. H. Scott, Inc., a company that manufactured high-fidelity audio and visual equipment. Products were sold under the Scott name until 1991, the year the line was discontinued.

In 1986 Emerson began importing and marketing compact refrigerators and Hi-Fi stereo VHS VCRs. Camcorders, telephones, and answering machines were added to its product line in fiscal 1988. In 1990 personal computers and facsimile machines were added for a major roll-out to more than 500 Wal-Mart stores. In 1992 sales reached a peak of $891.4 million, but net income was only $10.4 million.

Emerson's addition of personal computers resulted in a $150 million loss for the company. That coupled with the recession that began in 1990 brought the company's total loss to $37.5 million in the last nine months of the year. Shares of stock fell as low as $2, compared to the high of $12.75 in 1987. Several shareholder lawsuits charged some Emerson directors and officials with breach of fiduciary duty and self-dealing. Emerson also fell into technical default on its long-term debt of $55.4 million at the end of the year. In 1988, Emerson Radio was sold to Panasonic.

=== 1991–2000 ===
The Emerson Radio logo that was used prior to 2006. The current logo now uses a futuristic version with a slanted G clef logo and "Emerson" in an electrified, neon-type font (as seen on the website).

Fidenas Investment Ltd., a Swiss firm based in the Bahamas, began purchasing shares of Emerson Radio stock in 1989. It held a 20 percent stake (more than that held by Stephen and William Lane) by 1992, when they began a takeover attempt. The Lane brothers were seeking to restructure $180 million in debt, but conceded defeat in June 1992. Emerson's financial situation worsened, and in fiscal 1993 the company incurred a loss of $56 million on sales of $741.4 million. When the company filed for bankruptcy in October 1993, Emerson had been in default on $223 million in debt for the previous two years.

In 1994, the company emerged from bankruptcy pursuant to a plan of reorganization and with $75 million in financing arranged by Fidenas, which had assumed a 90 percent stake in Emerson. It then issued 30 million shares, some of which were claimed by creditors. Legal battles ensued and continued until mid-August 2001.

In early 1995, in an effort to cut costs, Emerson Radio licensed the manufacture of certain video products under the Emerson and G Clef trademarks for a three-year period to Otake Trading Co. Ltd. The company also licensed the sale of these products in the United States and Canada for the same period to Wal-Mart Stores, Inc. As a result, Emerson's net sales fell from $654.7 million in fiscal 1995 to $245.7 million in fiscal 1996, with the licensing agreement only providing about $4 million a year in royalty income.

Also in 1995, Emerson Radio entered the home theater and car audio fields, and the $900-million-a-year home and personal security market with a carbon monoxide detector. The company planned to eventually lend its name to burglar alarms, motion detectors, personal alarms, smoke detectors, and safety lights; however, the company left this field in fiscal 1997. Additionally, Emerson announced it would license the Emerson name to more than 250 audio and video accessories made by Jasco Products Co., an Oklahoma firm selling cables, remote controls, and appliance cleaning devices.

The company took a 27 percent stake in Sport Supply Group, Inc., the largest direct-mail distributor of sporting goods equipment and supplies to the U.S. institutional market, for $11.5 million in late 1996.

Subsequent to a net income of $7.4 million in fiscal 1995, Emerson dropped into the red again the following three years. They lost $13.4 million, $24 million, and $1.4 million in fiscal 1996, 1997, and 1998, respectively, with net revenues of $245.7 million, $178.7 million, and $162.7 million.

Emerson Radio Corp. announced in November 1998 that it had entered into an exclusive agreement with Team Products International, Inc. of Boonton, N.J., a distributor of audio, video and other consumer electronic product accessories in the United States and Canada. They promoted the sale of a wide variety of Emerson branded consumer electronic products and accessories.

The owner of Fidenas's, Geoffrey P. Jurick, had assumed the position of Chief Executive Officer (CEO) of the company in 1992 and in 1998 he added the titles of President and Chairman of the Board. In December 1998 he held 60 percent of Emerson's common stock. Kenneth S. Grossman, a private investor, along with Oaktree Capital Management, a Los Angeles-based investment firm that held a smaller stake in Emerson Radio, proposed to buy Jurick's holdings in the company for more than $14.6 million. The offer was rejected as "inadequate." Emerson announced in August 1999 that it planned to sell to Oaktree for $28.9 million.

On the day the licensing agreement with Otake expired, Emerson replaced the company with Daewoo Electronics Co. Ltd., which entered into a four-year agreement with Emerson to manufacture and sell television and video products bearing the Emerson and G Clef trademark to U.S. retailers. In 1999, Emerson also signed five-year license and supply agreements with Cargil International covering the Caribbean and Central and South American markets, along with WW Mexicana for certain consumer products to be sold in Mexico. They also had a licensing agreement with Telesound Electronics for telephones, answering machines, and caller ID products in the United States and Canada.

Net income for Emerson was only $289,000 on net revenues of $158.7 million in fiscal 1999 with a long-term debt of $20.8 million at the end of the fiscal year. Nearly 84 percent of its merchandise that year was imported, primarily from China, Hong Kong, Malaysia, South Korea, and Thailand. Tonic Electronics (32 percent), Daewoo (22 percent), and Imarflex (12 percent) were its main suppliers. The company depended heavily on Wal-Mart Stores, which took about 52 percent of its goods in fiscal 1999, and Target Stores, Inc., which took about 24 percent.

=== 2001–present ===
In 2001, Emerson exited the video electronics business (TVs, DVD players, VCRs) and handed 100% of the manufacturing operations to Funai, which continued to make and market Emerson consumer video products for Wal-Mart. In January 2003, Emerson announced it had entered into a letter of intent naming Sanlian Group of Shandong, China the exclusive distributor of Emerson branded products through its subsidiary, Sanlian Household Electric Appliance Company (SHEAC). The agreement contemplated the supply and distribution of Emerson originated product categories through SHEAC's 200 retail stores and maintenance service centers as well as its extensive BtoB and BtoC e-commerce network. Sanlian was to license the Emerson brand for additional product categories it finds suitable for China-wide distribution and cooperate with Emerson in the design, development and sourcing for such.

== Products ==
=== Consumer electronics ===
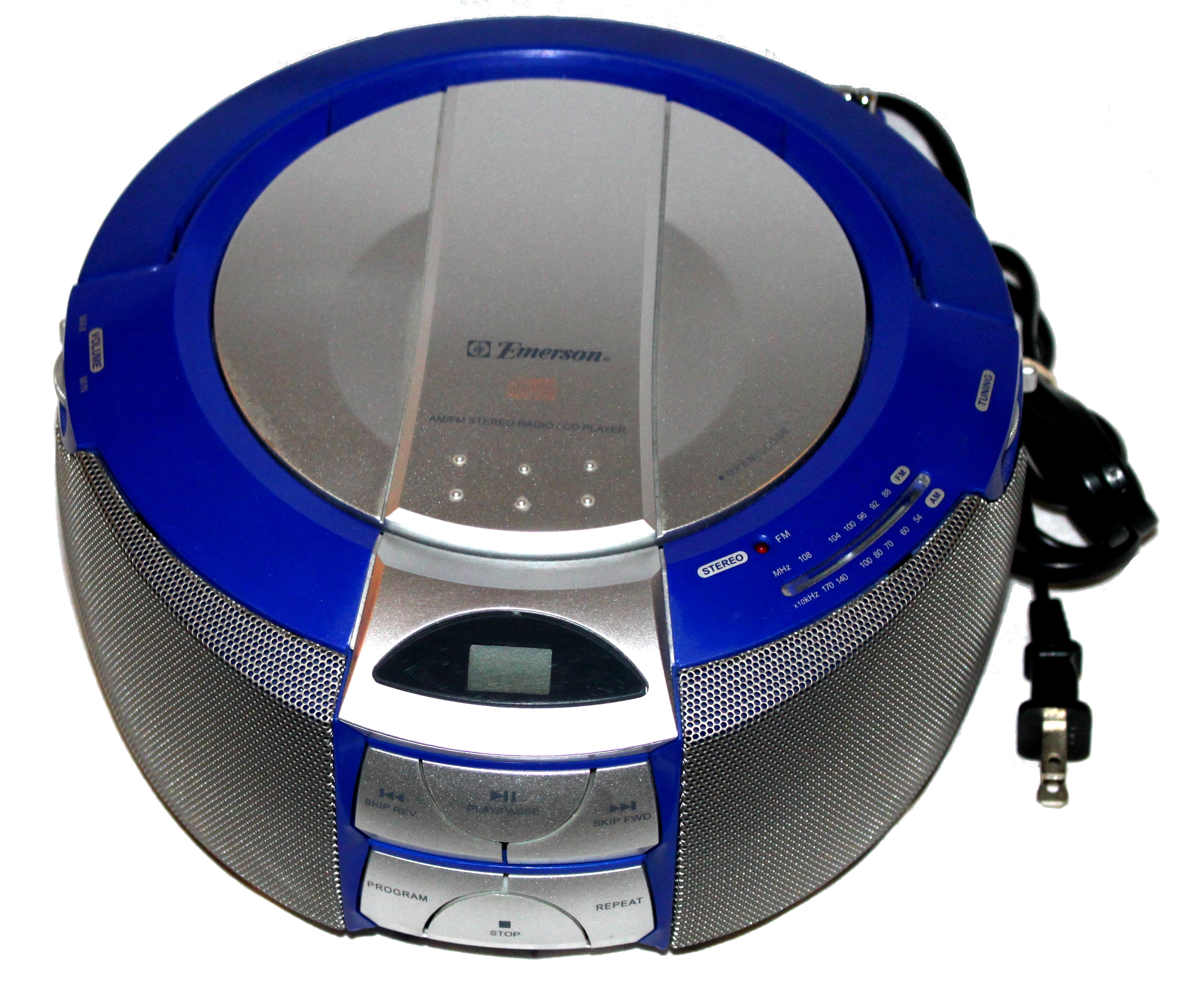
Emerson portable AM/FM stereo radio and CD player

Products include televisions (flat tube and LCD), VCRs, DVD players and combos, other video products, home theater, home and car audio, audio accessories, high-end acoustics, microwave ovens, office and Wireless products. Some products are also marketed under the name "Emerson Research".

Emerson's main focus is the distribution and sale of low to moderately priced products, therefore their distribution is primarily through mass merchants, discount retailers, specialty catalogers, and the Internet. As a brand, Emerson gains further leverage globally through various licensing agreements. For example, Emerson brand TV, DVD, TV/VCR/DVD combination units are made by Funai.

=== Smartset ===
Emerson Radio pioneered the Smartset clock radio which automatically sets itself with the correct time and date using a battery back-up oscillator time base to accurately set the clock's time when the alarm clock is powered-on and after a power outage. In recent years, the company has expanded the Smartset line adding models with features including a time projector, infrared touchless snooze control, CD-R/CD-RW, and an integrated "Made for iPod" top-mounting docking station.

== Historical products ==
In 1915, at the company's inception, Emerson's main product was the Universal Cut Records, capable of being played laterally or vertically. Music offered included a wide variety of popular, band, opera, classical, religious, and folk music. Also during their first years, Emerson offered one of the last of the external-horn phonographs, which sold for only $3.

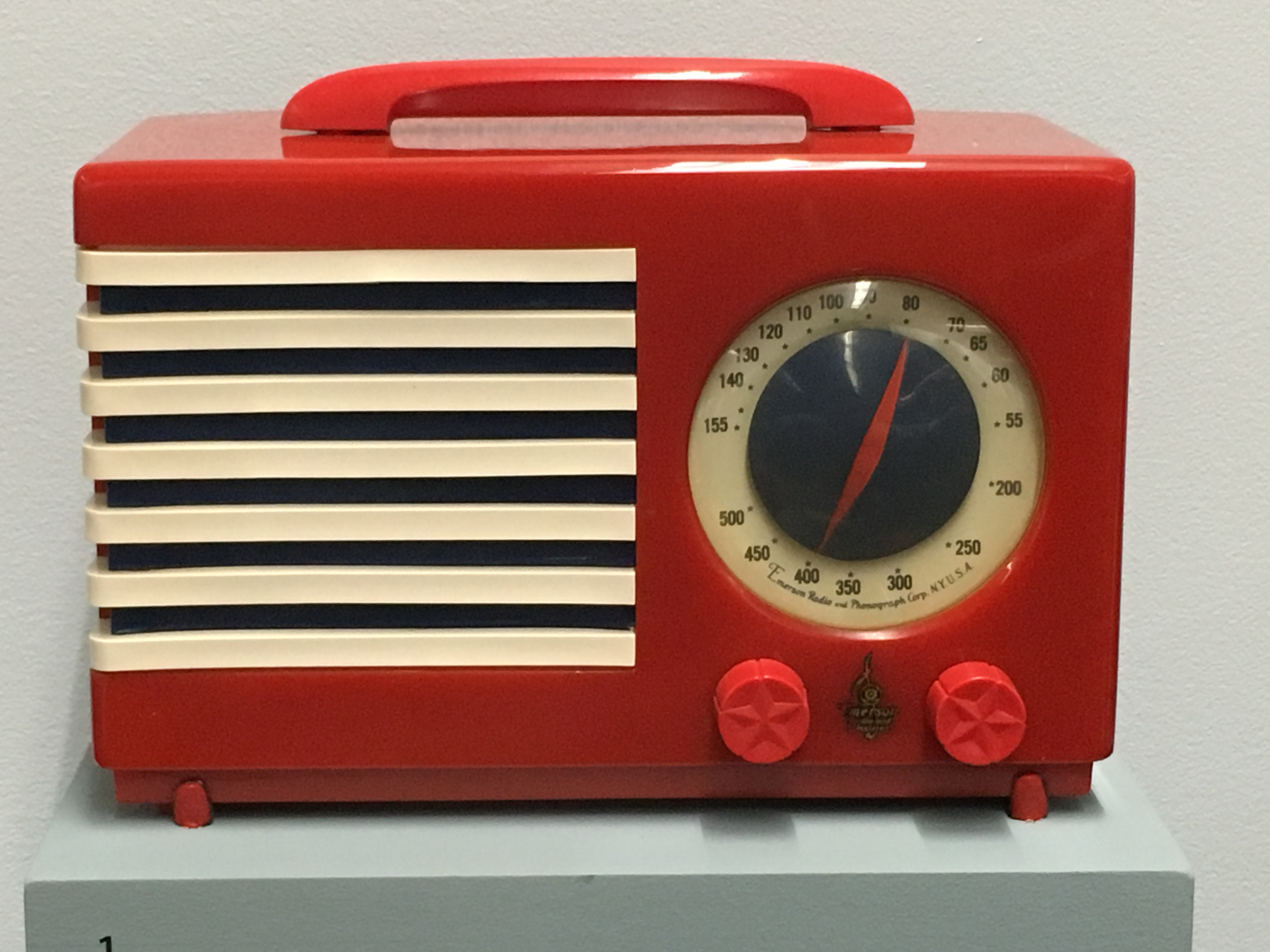
Emerson Model 400-3 "Patriot" (1940) radio, made of Catalin

The "peewee" Model 25 radio was introduced December 1932. Measuring about 8½ inches long and 6¼ inches wide, approximately 60 percent of all radios sold between early December 1932 and late May 1933 were Model 25s, half of which were manufactured by Emerson. The Universal Compact line was priced from $17.95 to $32.50. Emerson led the production and sale of this class of radio until 1938, having by then sold more than a million.

In 1947 Emerson offered a television set with a 10-inch tube, which retailed for $375. It was among Emerson's first postwar products. They dropped the price to $269.50 by June 1948, when the newly developed television industry had sold 375,000 sets.

In 1953, Emerson Radio and Phonograph purchased Quiet Heet Corp., which entered the company into air conditioning.

Although radio represented only 15 percent of Emerson's revenue by 1954, the company credited itself as creating the first clock radio, self-powered radio, and transistorized pocket radio.

Production of tape recorders began in 1955.

When Emerson purchased Allen B. DuMont Laboratories, Inc. in 1958, a higher-priced line of television sets, phonographs and high-fidelity and stereo instruments, along with the DuMont trademark was added to Emerson's products.

In 1979, Emerson began selling Heart Aide, after purchasing a large portion of Cardiac Resuscitator Corp. The company spent heavily to develop and produce both an improved implantable cardioverter-defibrillator and a pacemaker. In addition, the company took an 18 percent share in a developer of computerized axial tomographic (CAT) scanners. As this line of products never made money, Emerson disposed of its holdings in them between 1987 and 1988.

In 1982, Emerson manufactured the Arcadia 2001, the most well-known of the "Emerson Arcadia 2001" second-generation 8-bit game console variations. Although, considerably more powerful than the then-dominant Atari 2600, the Arcadia 2001 wasn't released until just before the more-advanced Atari 5200 and the ColecoVision, in mid-1982. It was successful in other countries, however, because Atari had exclusive rights to many games, it was nearly impossible for Emerson to market in the United States due to the lack of popular game titles.

In 1983, Emerson began selling re-branded Goldstar televisions at inflated prices for a substantial profit. The compact disc player and microwave oven were introduced in 1985 doubling sales. In 1986 Emerson began importing and marketing compact refrigerators. Camcorders, telephones, and answering machines were added to its product line in fiscal 1988. Personal computers and facsimile machines were added in 1990.

In 1995, Emerson Radio entered the home theater and car audio fields, and the $900-million-a-year home and personal security market with a carbon monoxide detector, however, they left this field in 1997. Also in 1995, Emerson announced it would license its name to more than 250 audio and video accessories made by Jasco Products Co., a firm selling cables, remote controls, and appliance cleaning devices.

Emerson began manufacturing and selling television and video products bearing the Emerson and G Clef trademark to U.S. retailers in 1999. They also had a licensing agreement with Telesound Electronics for telephones, answering machines, and caller ID products in the United States and Canada.
