= H. H. Scott, Inc. =

American manufacturer

H. H. Scott, Inc. was a major manufacturer of hi-fi equipment in the U.S. It was founded in 1947 by Hermon Hosmer Scott in Cambridge, Massachusetts and moved to the nearby town of Maynard in 1957.

== History ==
H.H. Scott sold some of the earliest FM stereo multiplex tuners and receivers, with some units sold as kits. The company's competition included brands like Fisher, Marantz, McIntosh, and Harman Kardon. The 1961 Model 350 was the first FM stereo multiplex tuner sold in the US. H.H. Scott was involved in early stereo multiplex testing with radio station WCRB in Boston, one of the first three U.S. FM stations to broadcast in multiplex stereo.

The company pioneered developments in noise suppression, tube output circuits, hifi mono and stereo amplifiers, tuners, FM multiplex, transistor receivers, FET RF sections, and integrated circuit IF sections.

Scott's Instrument Division manufactured precision sound measuring and analysis instrumentation for laboratory use.

"Lacking the capital needed to continue operations, Scott terminated its production in October 1972. In November 1972, several of Scott's creditors filed a petition for involuntary bankruptcy under Chapter X of the Bankruptcy Act, and Scott filed a petition for reorganization under Chapter XI of the Bankruptcy Act. In the same month, Eastern Air Devices released its option to acquire the company. In January 1973, however, the Scott company was acquired by SYMA International, Brussels, Belgium, Scott's European licensee." "Production at Maynard was resumed in February 1973." Further refuting the widespread notion that EAD acquired Scott is a letter to the editor of Audio mag, Oct 1975, by Mr. Susskind, EAD pres.

Per NYT obit, Hermon Scott retired in 1972. Per Audio Eng Society obit, Technical Director Daniel Von Recklinghausen was appointed staff consultant at Electro Audio Dynamics (formerly Eastern Air Devices) in 1973.

Between late 1975 and late 1976, the company's operations moved from Maynard to Woburn, Mass.

In 1977 Scott amplifiers made in the USA were sold in Switzerland and came with a 3 year guarantee. This was certified with a credit card shaped plastic guarantee card.

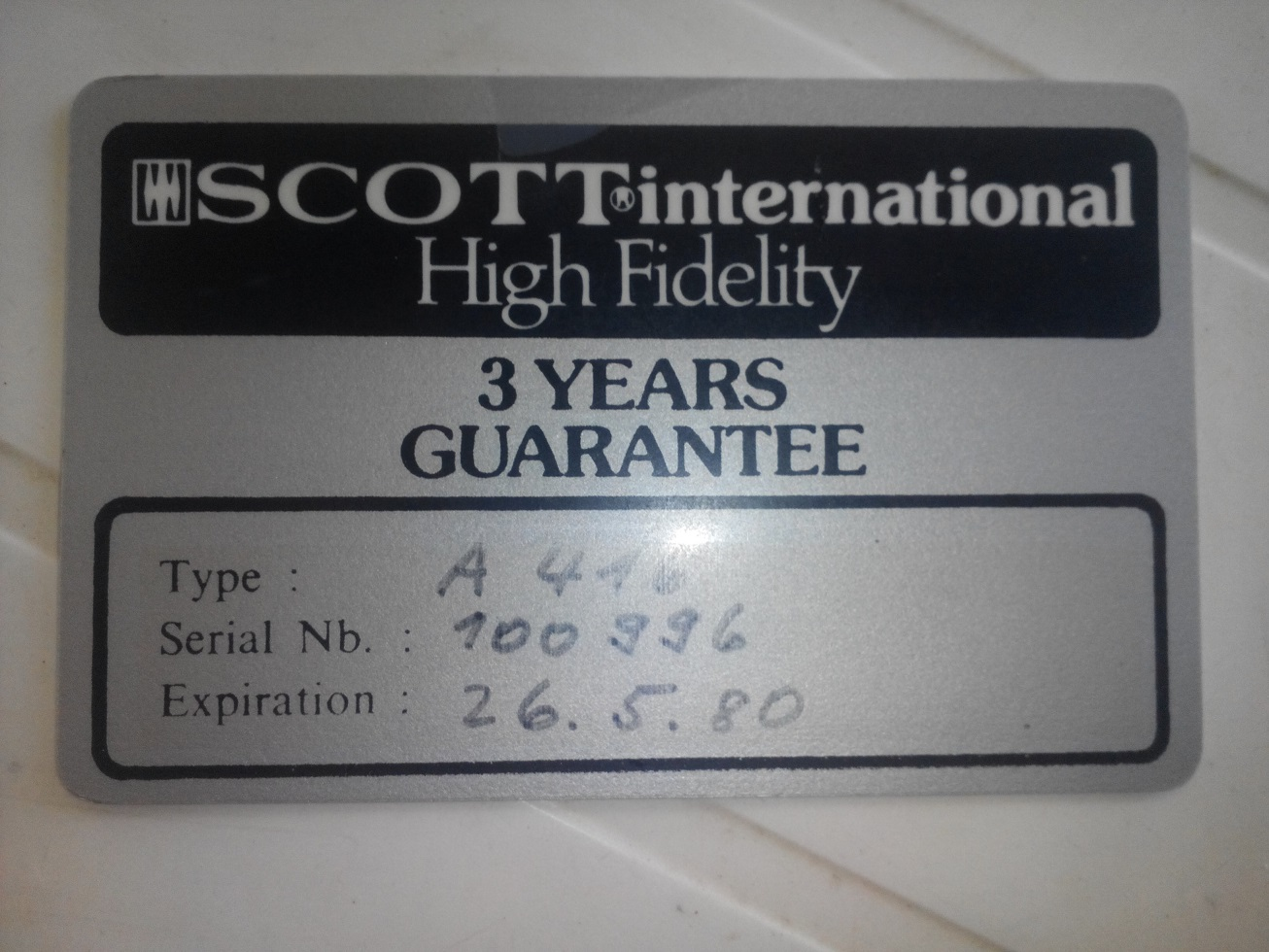

In 1985, the brand was purchased by Emerson Electronics.

== E.H. Scott ==
E.H. Scott Radio Laboratories is sometimes confused with H.H. Scott. E.H. Scott was founded in 1925 by Chicago resident Ernest H. Scott.

Its first product was the World's Record Super 8, a TRF (tuned radio frequency) design with typical harness wiring with 16 gauge silvered solid core copper wire employed in an array configuration that was typical to radios at the time. This construction method, combined with fire-retardant shields remains the standard for high precision medical equipment such as those devices (MRI and CT scanners, primarily) that have high residual charges exceeding 63kv on peak (+/- 0.6 dB/33 dB drop). The Super 8 featured eight tubes. It was introduced in November 1926 and was featured in the RADIO AGE November 1926 issue. Scott receivers were known as the Stradivarius of Radio Receivers. Made in a standard box configuration, out of hardwood, the Super 8 employed two TRF stages that were atypical in that a phased antenna potentiometer was supplied for each TRF stage and phase-coupled the two TRF stages. This made for easy tuning through the band using inductive capacitance in the place of a more typical arrangement that would employ a box circuit using inductors phased in series across the TRF stages. Dual capacitance instead of a more typical capacitive/inductive circuit was a measure that avoided costly and fragile transformers.{{citation to be added to revised or new page as follows: [Jim Clark's E.H. Scott Radio Collectors Guide, 1995, Okemosh Mich, USA]}}

The company motto was "The Fine Things Are Always Made by Hand". The company published news of its latest developments in monthly "The Scott News" from 1929 to 1946. The company was also known as Scott Radio Laboratories, and went through many changes of ownership until its eventual merge with John Meck in the 1950s. Known for its elaborate, high quality radio receivers, the company briefly employed Hermon Scott and licensed Scott's Dynamic Noise Reduction Circuit (later called Dynaural). It is also claimed that H. H. Scott was never employed by E. H. Scott. In later years, H. H. Scott filed a lawsuit ending the use of the Scott Radio Laboratories name.

== Gallery ==
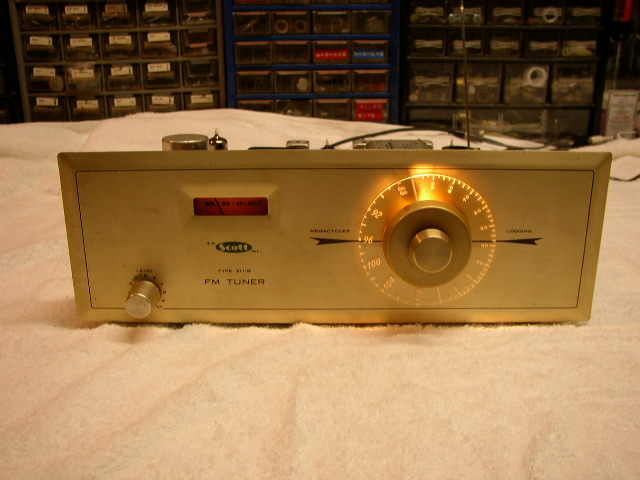
1956 Model 311-B Mono FM Tuner

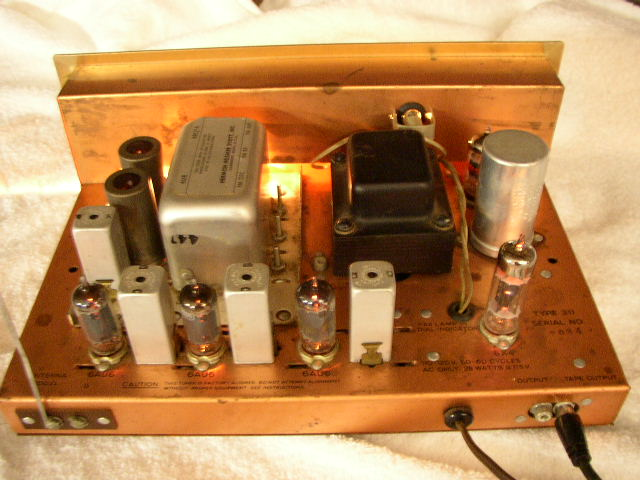
1956 Model 311-B Top View of the tubes

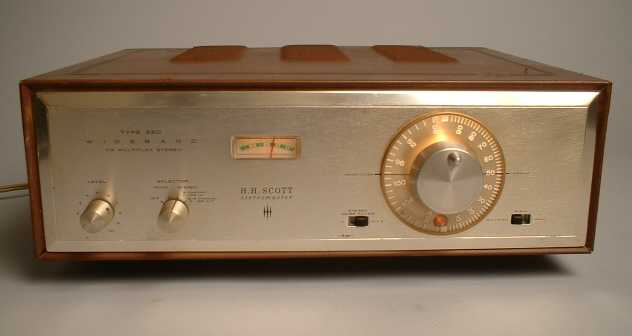
1961 Model 350A FM Multiplex Stereo Tube Tuner - The First FM Multiplex Stereo Tuner on the US market

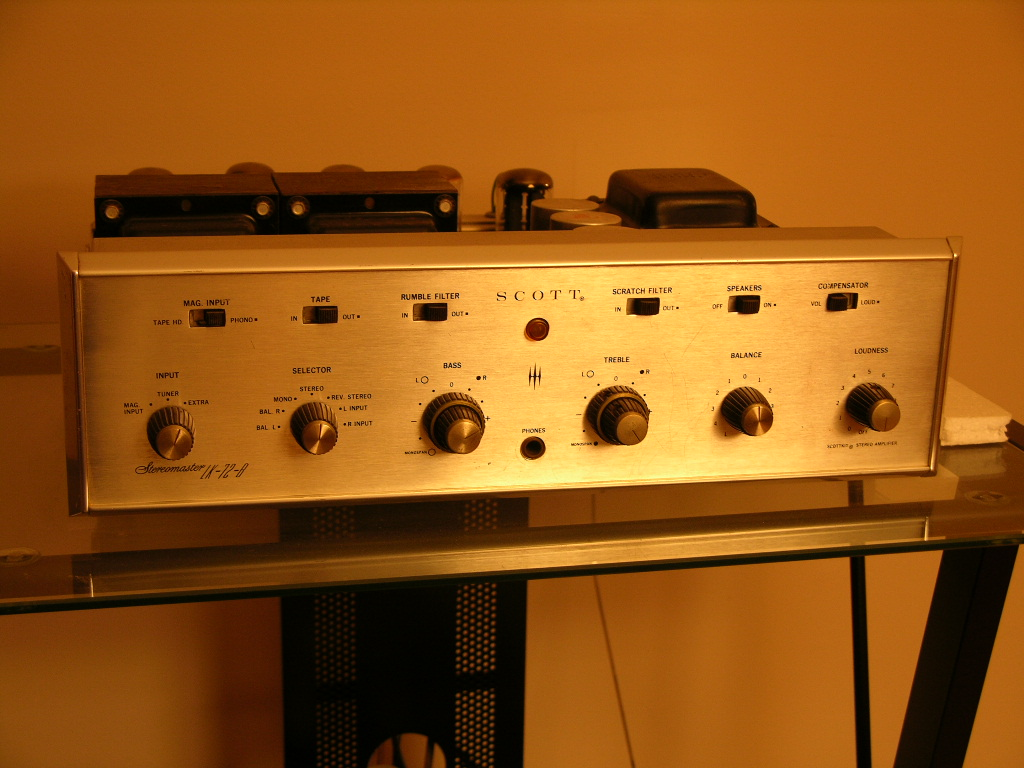
1964 Model LK-72 B 80 Watt Stereo Tube Integrated Amplifier—sold in kit form

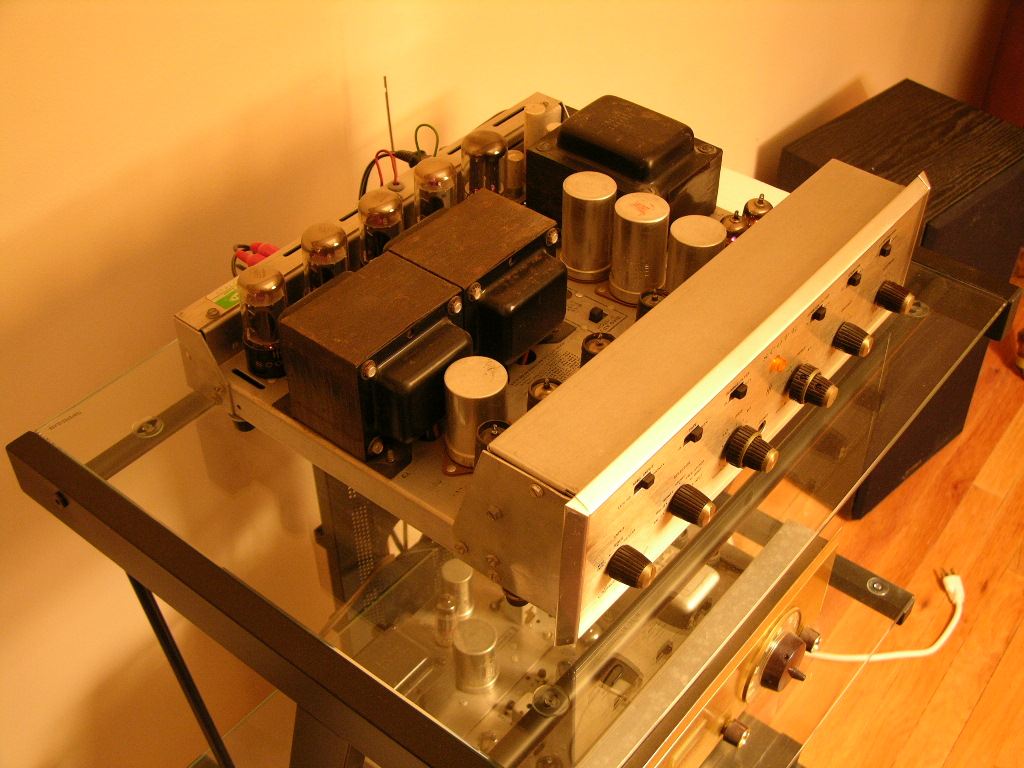
TOP VIEW 1964 Model LK-72 B 80 Watt Stereo Tube Integrated Amplifier

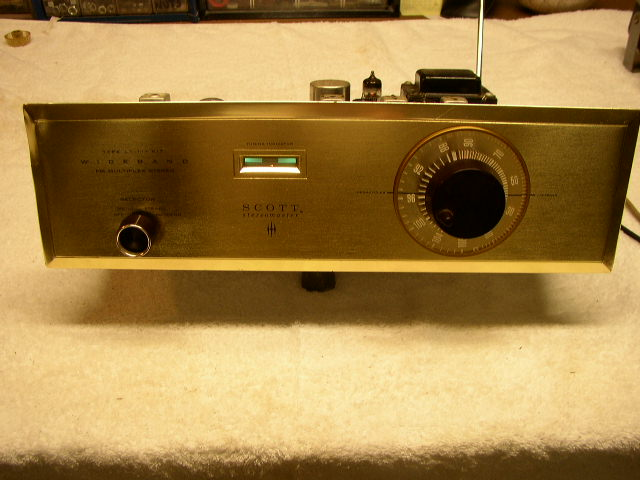
Rare HH Scott LT-111 FM Stereo Tube Kit Tuner Utilizing Compactron Tubes c. 1965

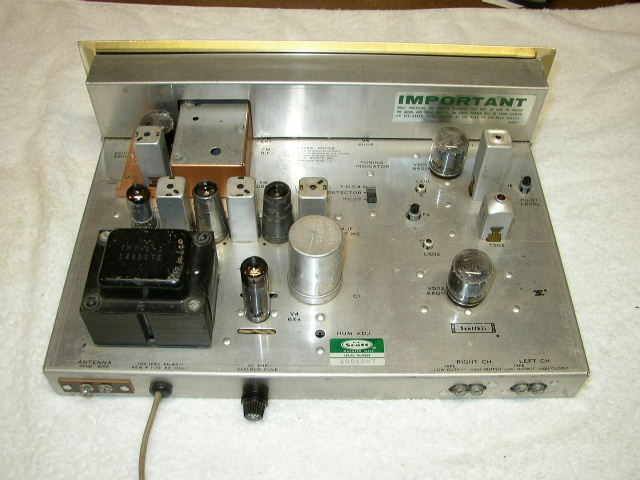
LT-111 Top Chassis View

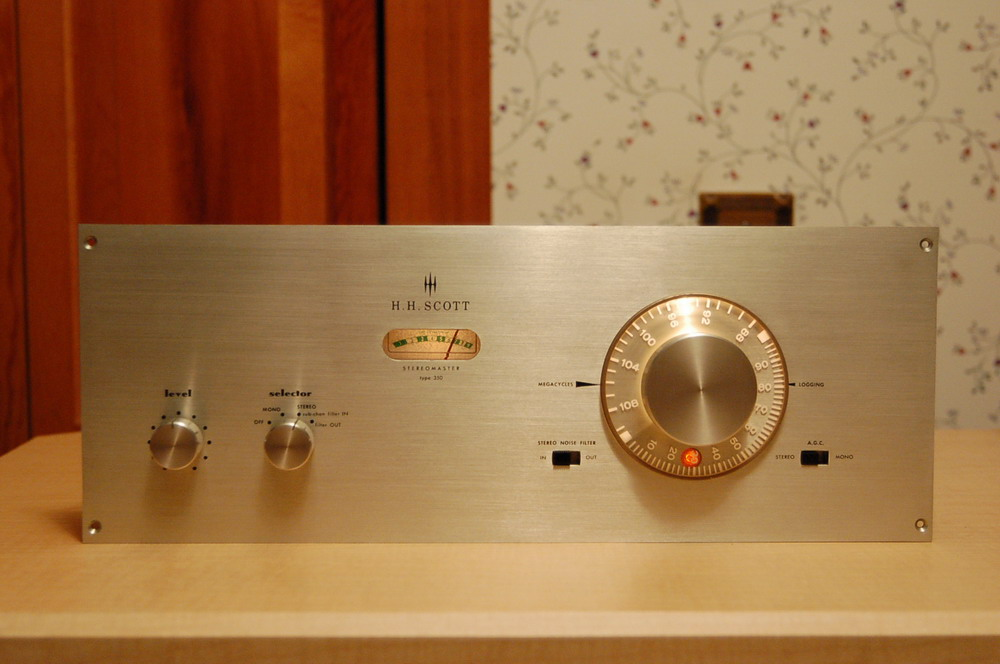
Rare HH Scott Model 350 Tube FM Multiplex Tuner with dealer installed Marantz faceplate.

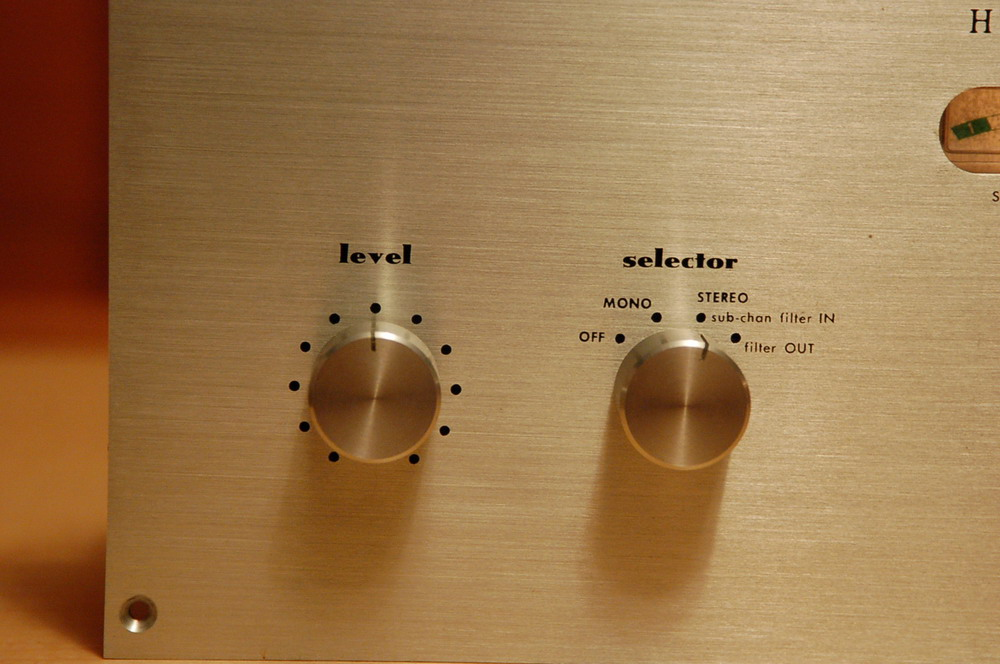
Rare HH Scott Model 350 Tube FM Multiplex Tuner (Marantz Font View) with dealer installed Marantz faceplate.

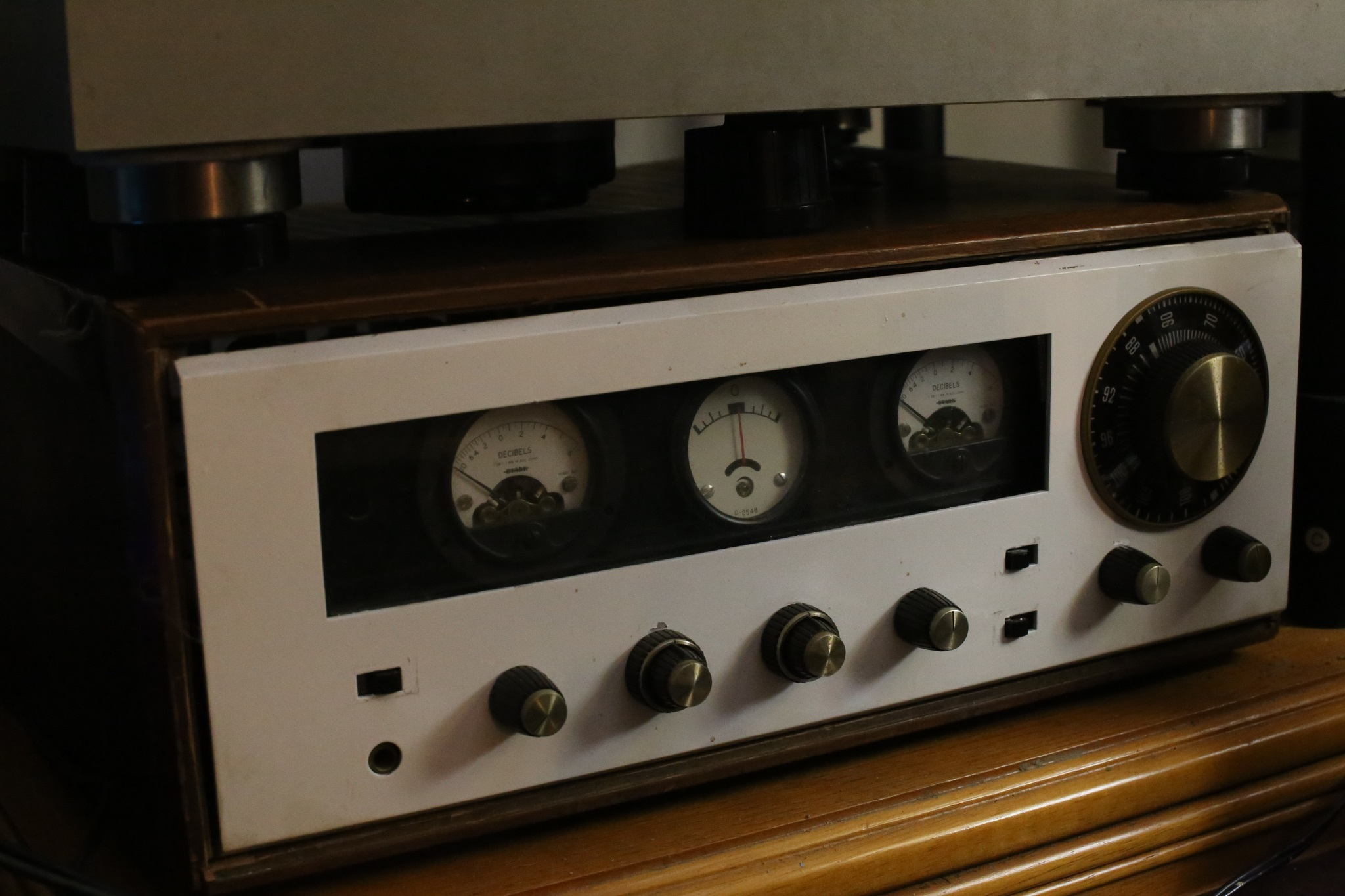
Unique HH Scott Diversity Master Tuner.
