= Emerson Records =

American record company and label

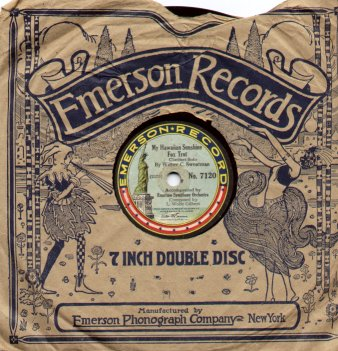
- Early 7-inch Emerson Record in its original paper sleeve
- Founded: 1915
- Founder: Victor Hugo Emerson
- Defunct: 1928
- Status: Inactive
- Genre: Various
- Country of origin: U.S.
- Location: New York City

Emerson Records was an American record company and label created by Victor Emerson in 1915.

Victor Hugo Emerson was the chief recording engineer at Columbia Records. In 1914 he left the company, created the Emerson Phonograph Company, and then Emerson Records the following year. He began producing small records, 5-inch discs that sold for 10 cents and 7-inch discs that sold for 25 cents.

Early discs consisted of popular tunes, dance numbers, and patriotic marches, recorded by musicians in New York City who were credited as the "Emerson Orchestra" or sometimes "The Emerson Symphony Orchestra". Classical records were made by violinist David Hochstein (his only recordings), pianist Arthur Friedheim, and the orchestra of New York's Rialto Theatre under its director Hugo Riesenfeld.

In January 1918 Emerson added a line of 9-inch records that sold for 75 cents. After World War I, Emerson began an ambitious expansion of the business, and in 1919 added a line of industry standard 10-inch discs for 85 cents and increased to one dollar the following year. In 1919 Emerson introduced 12-inch discs, mostly of classical music, for US$1.25.

The label's catalog included recordings by Wilbur Sweatman, Eddie Cantor, the Six Brown Brothers, the Louisiana Five, Lizzie Miles, Eubie Blake, Fletcher Henderson, the Original Memphis Five, John W. Myers, Henry Burr and the Peerless Quartet, Billy Golden, Collins & Harlan, Sally Hamlin, Dan W. Quinn, Sam Ash, Vernon Dalhart, Van and Schenck, Ada Jones, and Homer Rodeheaver.

In May 1920, Emerson opened a second recording studio in Los Angeles, California. His expansions over-extended the company's finances and forced it into receivership in 1921. In May 1922 investors Benjamin Abrams and Rudolph Kararek purchased the Emerson Company for US$50,000 and raised an additional US$200,000 of capital to revive the business. Emerson discs were then sold for 50 cents each.

In 1924, the investors sold Emerson to the Scranton Button Company of Scranton, Pennsylvania. About this time, electric microphones replaced mechanical recording techniques, and Emerson switched to the new method of sound recording in 1926. Scranton Button Co. halted production of new records by its Emerson subsidiary in 1928, but the company retained the name and later applied it to a line of radios. After about 1924 or 1925, Emerson was no longer a popular label. It seldom recorded any artists of note, mostly standard performers who were jobbing around New York, which explains why the later "Electrosonic Emerson" records are so scarce.

The company also issued race records that were marketed to blacks. These included the 78 "He Wasn't Born in Araby, But He's a Sheikin' Fool" b/w "Heart Breakin' Joe" (1924), recorded by Ethel Finnie.

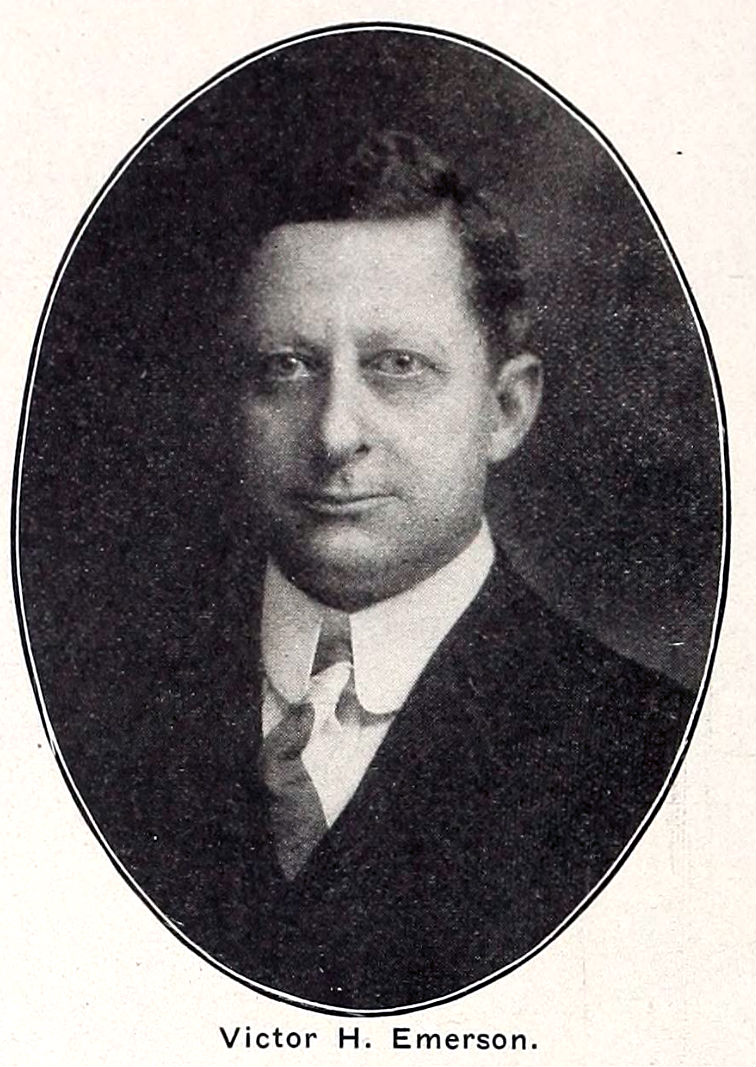
Emerson Records founder Victor H. Emerson ca. 1912.

== See also ==
- List of record labels
- Emerson Radio
