= Maschinenfest =

Music festival

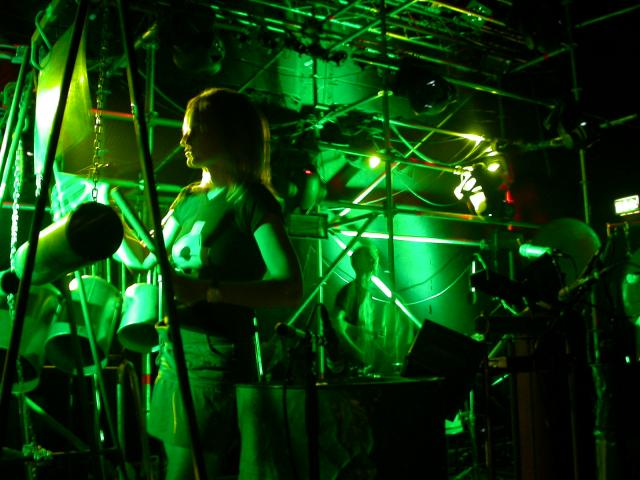
- Militia at Maschinenfest
- Genre: Industrial, power electronics, noise, alternative electronic, Breakcore, Techstep
- Dates: October
- Locations: Turbinenhalle in Oberhausen, originally Aachen, Germany
- Years active: 1999–2018
- Founders: Thomas Hein
- Website: Maschinenfest.de

Maschinenfest was an annual three-day underground music festival in Germany, featuring industrial, power electronics, noise and other alternative electronic performers. It included both independent and signed bands as well as many vendors for music and related merchandise. Featured record labels and noteworthy companies included Ant-Zen, Hands Productions, Pflichtkauf, Spectre Records and Ad Noiseam.

== History ==
The festival was traditionally held in October in the bunker of the Autonomes Zentrum (AZ) deep underground Aachen, Germany. The venue posed some problems with heat, humidity and air circulation, as well as condensation dripping on to the gear of the performers, but the atmosphere of the bunker proved quite fitting to the genres of music played throughout the festival. For only one edition, in 2003, the festival moved to the castle ruin of Schloss Leerodt in Geilenkirchen. From 2004 to 2008, Maschinenfest was held at the Kulturfabrik in Krefeld, Germany. In 2009, the festival was held in Essen, and starting in 2010, the festival was held in the Turbinenhalle in Oberhausen.

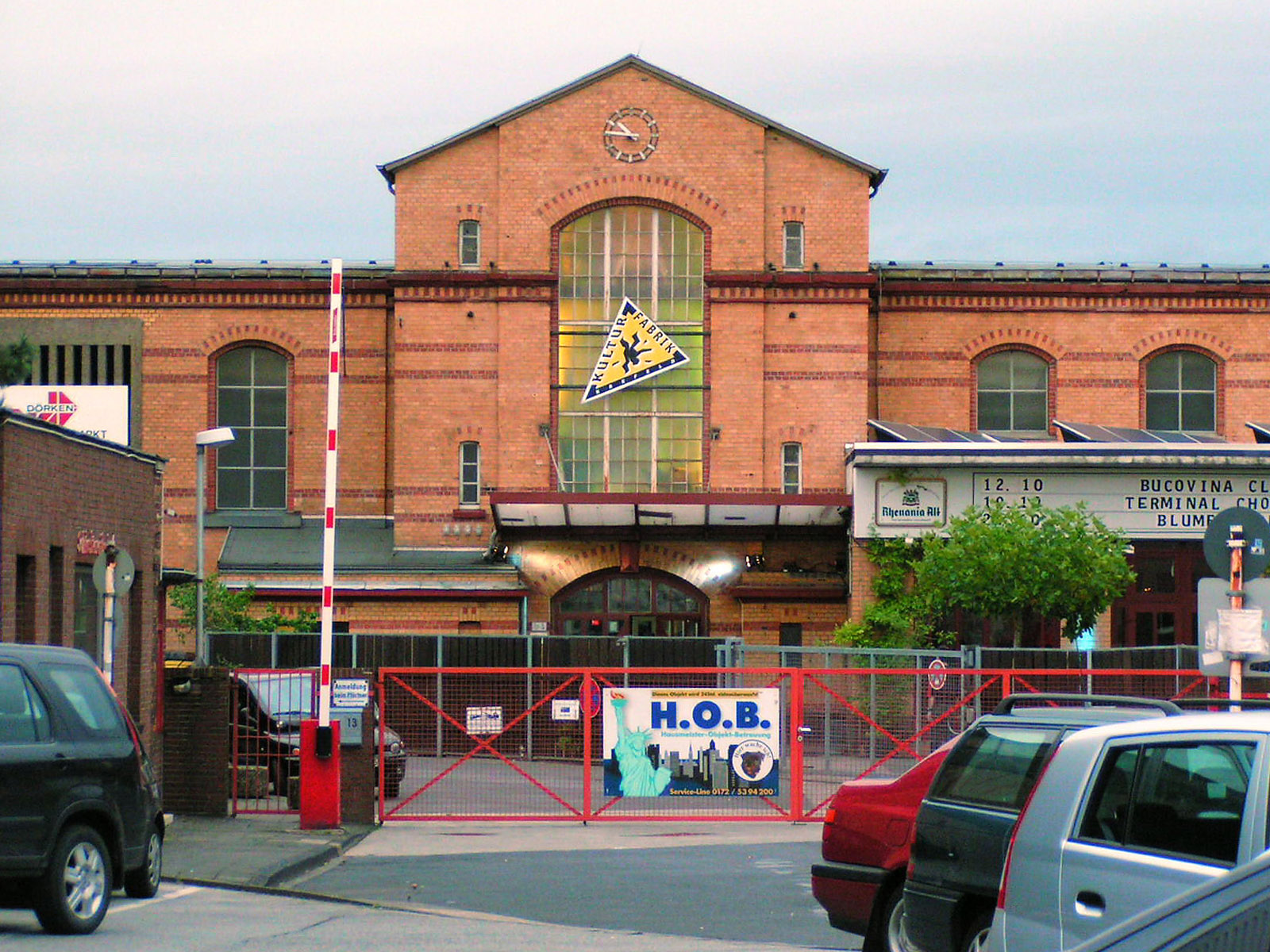
The Kulturfabrik Krefeld in October 2007

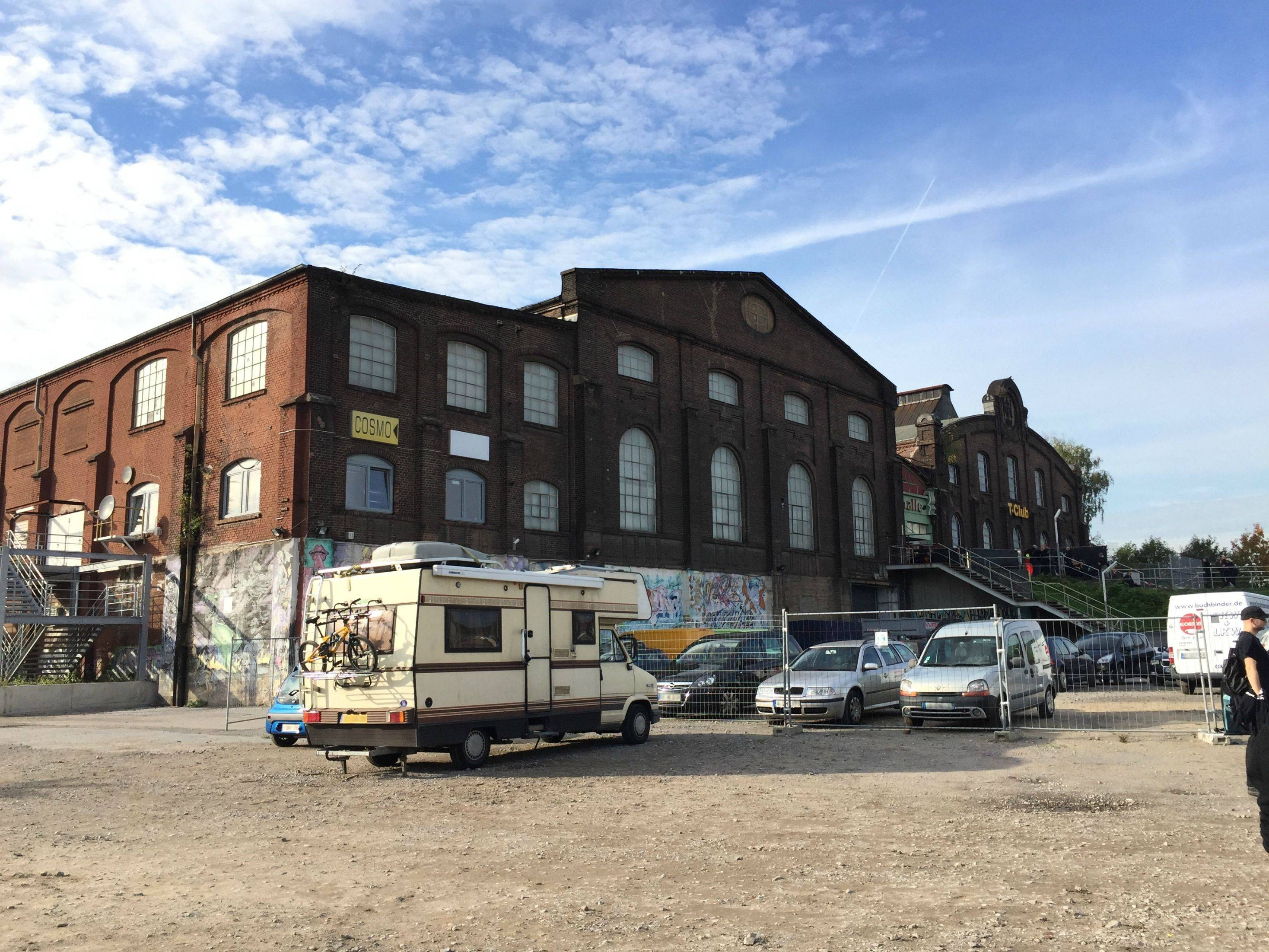
Turbinenhalle Oberhausen in October 2014

Part of the pre-festival activities was the "Maschinenfaces" page where the visitors could add pictures of themselves and state where they were staying and who they were with as well as comment on each other's pictures.

An April Fools' Day posting on the Side-Line website claimed that the 2008 edition, the 10th one, would also be the final one. This was not the case.

In 2011 Wolfram Bange, Henning Hinck, Sebastian Vogel and Lena Neugebauer filmed a documentary about the festival. It was a tribute to the scene and can be watched on several video platforms for free.

== Line-Up ==
=== 1999–2003 ===
- 1999: Imminent Starvation (now Imminent), Winterkälte, P.A.L, Noisex, Ah Cama-Sotz, Hypnoskull vs. Tunnel, ZymOsiZ, Synapscape, S.alt, MS Gentur, Morgenstern, Andxesion
- 2000: SINA, Klangstabil, MS Gentur, Silk Saw, Xingu Hill, Scorn, Imminent, Ammo, Celluloid Mata, NKVD, Asche, Proyecto Mirage, Synapscape, Tunnel, Winterkälte, Mlada Fronta, Mono No Aware, Monokrom, Somatic Responses, Sona Eact. Vromb, Converter, Panacea vs. Needle Sharing
- 2001: Iszoloscope, Frames a Second, Typhoid, Noosa Hedz, Xabex, Monolith, P.A.L, Synapscape, Templegardens, Substanz T, Telepherique feat. Roger Rotor, Cybernetic Fuckheadz, Savak, Sonar, Winterkälte, Law Rah Collective, Contagious Orgasm, Azure Skies, Axiome, Panacea vs. Needle Sharing, Proyecto Mirage, Black Lung, Orphx
- 2002: Sonic Dragolgo, Synth-Etik, SINA, m2, Klangstabil feat. S.alt, Somatic Responses, Hypnoskull, Winterkälte, Config.Sys, Tarmvred, Roger Rotor, Deutsch Nepal, Placid, Panacea vs. Needle Sharing, Klinik, Ars Moriendi, Die neue Sachlichkeit, This Morn' Omina, Xabec, Mimetic, Mental Destruction, Venetian Snares vs. Fanny vs. Hecate, Imminent, Vromb
- 2003: CellAutoMata, Law-Rah Collective, Iszoloscope, Asche, ULTRA s t a t a l s ! feat. Hypnoskull, Panacea, Hanin Elias, 5F 55, Punch Inc., Telerotor, Pow[d]er Pussy, Mono No Aware, Klangstabil, Synapscape, Converter, Antigen Shift, Axiome, Detritus, Morgenstern, Architect, Needle Sharing, Ah Cama-Sotz, Sonar

=== 2004–2008 ===
- 2004: Dazzling Malicious, Greyhound, Norm, Monokrom, Geistform, Hecate, Mimetic, Vromb, This Morn' Omina, Heimstatt Yipotash, Genetic Selection, Hecq, ¥Π¥, Config.Sys, L'ombre, Hypnoskull, Winterkälte, Robert Görl, Caos, Mothboy, Polarlicht 4.1, s:cage, Catholic Boys in Heavy Leather, Larvae, Mlada Fronta, Sanctum, Monolith, Proyecto Mirage
- 2005: Ah Cama-Sotz, Ambassador21, Atrox, Az Rotator, Brighter Death Now, Contagious Orgasm, Contaminant, Deutsch Nepal, Imminent, Klangstabil, Kraken, Mental Destruction, Morgenstern, Orphx, Pow[d]er Pussy, Punch Inc., Rasputin, Roger Rotor, S.K.E.T., Synapscape, Architect, Empusae, Edgey, Enduser, Iszoloscope, Kom Intern, Kirdec Feat. Elekore, Lapsed, Loss, Sonar
- 2006: Antigen Shift, Asche, Bong-Ra, Black Lung, Camanecroszcope, Cdatakill, Geistform, Geneviéve Pasquier, Hypnoskull, Hysteresis, In Slaughter Natives, Institution D.O.L, m2, Mimetic, Militia, Moctan, Mono No Aware, Needle Sharing, Nullvektor, P.A.L, Shorai, Snog, Suicide Inside, The (Law-Rah) Collective, This Morn' Omina, Winterkälte, Xabec
- 2007: 100 Blumen, 5f-X, Ab ovo, Ah Cama-Sotz, Ahnst Anders, Ambassador21, Catholic Boys in Heavy Leather, Config.Sys, Dazzling Malicious, Detritus, Detune X, DJ Hidden, Drumcorps, Eva3, Greyhound, Keef Baker, Ordo Rosarius Equilibrio, Scrap Edx, S.K.E.T., Skincage, Sonar, Spherical Disrupted, Synapscape, This Morn' Omina, Twinkle, ¥Π¥, Vromb
- 2008: Hysteresis, Kirdec, P.A.L, Scorn, Architect & Enduser, Roger Rotor, Iszoloscope + Camanecroszcope + Ah Cama-Sotz, Mono No Aware, Kraken, Rasputeen In Heavy Leather, Larvae, Empusae & Friends, Xabec, Asche / Morgenstern & Ars Moriendi, Orphx, Imminent, Militia, Config.Sys + Ahnst Anders, Hypnoskull, Ambassador21 + Suicide Inside, Monokrom, Klangstabil, Punch Inc., Mimetic, Sonar, The (Law-Rah) Collective, Monolith, Ms Gentur, Proyecto Mirage, Contagious Orgasm, Bong-Ra, Vromb, Winterkälte

=== 2009–2013 ===
- 2009: 100 Blumen, Alarmen, Angina P, Broken Note, Contaminant, Dazzling Malicious, Dive, Greyhound, Geneviéve Pasquier, Synapscape, This Morn' Omina, Powder Pussy, Sudden Infant, Teknoist, Tzolk'in, Brighter Death Now, Feine Trinkers Bei Pinkels Daheim, DJ Hidden, Gjöll, Hecq, Heimstatt Yipotash, Last days Of S.E.X., Mono-Amine, S.K.E.T.
- 2010: Mandelbrot, 13th Monkey, Matta, Chrysalide, Bipol, Config.Sys, Ambassador21, Asche, Sonar, Simon Schall, Swanika, Zero Degree, ABS6, Subheim, Edgey, Iszoloscope, Ah Cama-Sotz, Winterkälte, Horque, Killer, Lingouf, Frl. Linientreu, Niveau Zero, Sonic Aarea, Nullvektor, Mono No Aware, Architect
- 2011: Dirk Geiger, Spherical Disrupted, Ahnst Anders, Suicide Inside, Igorrr, Xabec, Contaminant, Empusae, Synapscape, The_empath, Mobthrow, 16Pad Noise Terrorist, Atrabilis Sunrise, Näo, Pankow, Thorofon, This Morn' Omina, Needle Sharing, Saal5, Kirdec, Wieloryb, Dazzling Malicious, Marita Schreck, Balkansky & Loop Stepwalker, Contagious Orgasm, Imminent, Lustmord
- 2012: Hydrone, Dirty K, Sabes, Hysteresis, Nin Kuji, The [Law-Rah] Collective, Hecq, Enduser, Sonar, Oyaarss, Swanika, Syntech, Objekt Urian, Flint Glass, Pow[d]er Pussy, Militia, Winterkälte, 2 Kilos & More feat. Black Sifichi, Xanopticon, Underhill, Con-Dom, Geistform, Axiome, In Slaughter Natives, Haujobb, Roger Rotor
- 2013: Ah Cama-Sotz, Alarmen, Cacophoneuses, Config.sys, Control, Fausten, Greyhound, Hypnoskull, Iszoloscope, Klangstabil, Le Moderniste, Mezire, Mimetic, Monolog, Mono No Aware, Persons Unknown, Philipp Munch, Ruby My Dear, Shorai, Silent Walls, S.K.E.T., Sonic Area, Sudden Infant, Synapscape, The Klinik, The Ruins of Beverast, Tzolk'in

=== 2014–2018 ===
- 2014: Ambassador21, Architect, [basementgrrr], Catastrophe Noise, Chrysalide, Dazzling Malicious, Detritus, Empusa, GORE TECH, hologram_, Inade, Loss, MachineCode, Mono-Amine, Monolith, Moogulator, Mortaja, Näo, Nullvektor, Oyaarss, Phasenmensch, SaturmZlide, Sonar, Sylvgheist maëlström, Thee Secrete Society, Winterkälte, Zero Degree
- 2015: Nullgrad, Swarm Intelligence, Talvekoidik, Control, Wieloryb, Sudden Infant, Dive, Needle Sharing, Synapscape, Incite/, 2Methyl, Gjöll, 2Kilos & More, Distel, Scantum, Bad Sector, Drumcorps, Ah Cama-Sotz, Darkrad, Mago, Kommando, Rummelsnuff, Asche / Morgenstern, Fliehende Stürme, DJ Hidden, Geistform, Vromb
- 2016: the_empath, Dirk Geiger, Spherical Disrupted, Blush_Response, Fractional, Ambassador21, Deutsch Nepal, Hypnoskull, Winterkälte, Supersimmetria, Morthound, EA80, Heimstatt Yipotash, Sonic Area, Test Dept, 13th Monkey, Hologram_, Ancient Methods, Ecstasphere, Trackologists, Axiome, ESA, The [Law-Rah] Collective, Cervello Elettronico, Trepaneringsritualen, Niveau Zero, Iszoloscope
- 2017: Alarmen, Aphexia, Dive, Gatto Nero, Haus Am Rand, Imminent / Synapscape, In Slaughter Natives, Mono No Aware, Siamgda, Ah Cama-Sotz, Empusae, Esplendor Geometrico, Feine Trinkers Bei Pinkels Daheim, Geneviéve Pasqier, Gold, Greyhound, Somatic Responses, Suicide Inside, goreshit, Horskh, Kaffee Und Kuchen, Lustmord, Meta Meat, Monolith, Nur Zwei Linien, S.K.E.T., Sutcliffe Jugend, Yura Yura
- 2018: Ah Cama-Sotz, Alarmen, Ambassador21 vs. Suicide Inside, Architect, Chrysalide, Config.sys, Contagious Orgasm, Control, Dazzling Malicious, Dirk Geiger, Dive, DJ Hidden, Enduser, holotrop, Hypnoskull, Imminent, Iszoloscope, Killerlady, Mental Destruction, Monolith, Nullvektor, Orphx, Proyecto Mirage, Salt, Sutcliffe Jugend, Synapscape, The [Law-Rah] Collective, Vromb, Winterkälte, Xabec, Xoks

== See also ==
- List of industrial music festivals
- List of electronic music festivals
