= Placidus =

Placidus is Latin for "placid, gentle, quiet, still, calm, mild, peaceful" and can refer to:

- Placidus (martyr), 4th-century Sicilian martyr
- Lactantius Placidus (c. 350 – c. 400), writer
- Flavius Arcadius Placidus Magnus Felix (480–511), Consul of Rome
- Saint Placidus (6th century), follower of Benedict of Nursia
- Placidus de Titis (also de Titus, Latinization of Placido de Titi, 1603–1668), astrologer
- Placidus Böcken (1690–1752), German Benedictine canon lawyer, Vice-Chancellor of the University of Salzburg
- Placidus Braun (1756–1829), Bavarian Benedictine priest, historian and archivist
- Placidus Fixlmillner (1721–1791), Benedictine priest, first astronomer to compute the orbit of Uranus
- Placidus Nkalanga (1919–2015), Tanzanian Prelate of Roman Catholic Church
- Placidus a Spescha (1752–1833), Swiss monk and Alpine explorer

== See also ==
- Placidian system, for calculating astrological houses
- Lucanus placidus, beetle in the Family Lucanidae
- Placido (disambiguation)
- Placid
