= The Outside Agency =

Dutch musical duo

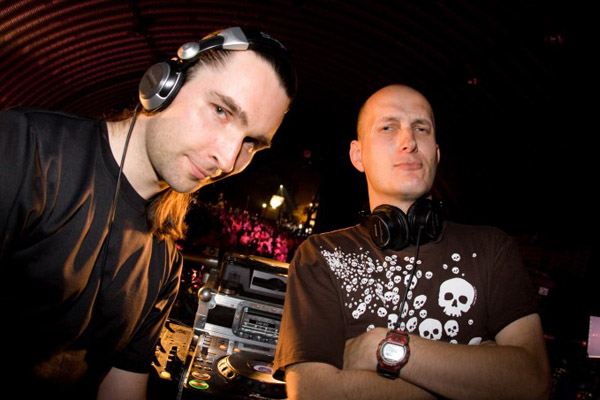
- The Outside Agency performing at the Q-Base Festival in Weeze, Germany in 2008.

Background information
- Origin: Goes, Netherlands
- Genres: hardcore, industrial hardcore, crossbreed, drum & bass, acid, dubstep, IDM
- Years active: 1996–present
- Labels: 46 Records, Ad Noiseam, Aentitainment Records, B2K Records, Black Monolith Records, Enzyme Records, Epileptik Productions, Future Sickness Recordings, Genosha Recordings, Hong Kong Violence, Independenza Records, Industrial Strength Records, Killing Sheep, Meta4 Recordings, Mokum Records, Nekrolog1k Recordings, NGM Records, Otaku Records, Provoke Records, PRSPCT Recordings, Smackdown Recordings, Sustained Records, Symp.TOM, TNI, Union Recordings
- Members: Frank Nitzinsky; Noël Wessels
- Website: www.theoutsideagency.com

The Outside Agency is a Dutch hardcore techno duo composed of DJ/producers Noël Wessels (also known by the stage name DJ Hidden) and Frank Nitzinsky (also known by the stage name Eye-D). The pair operate out of two studios based in Goes, Netherlands. They also run two record labels: Genosha Recordings and its sister label Genosha One Seven Five.

== History ==
Wessels and Nitzinsky were introduced to each other by mutual friends in late 1991. Until that time they both thought that they were alone in the production of hardcore music in their city. Shortly after being introduced, the two started working together and formed a group called X-Factor. In 1996, after several years of sending out demos, they landed their first record deal with Coolman Records. The same demo they sent to Coolman Records was also picked up by several weeks later by Mokum Records and also resulted in a signing. The duo came up with the name 'The Outside Agency' for Mokum Records as the X-Factor project was signed to Coolman Records exclusively.

Starting 1998 hardcore underwent many changes that caused The Outside Agency to no longer feel at home in the genre and they moved their focus to their drum & bass careers as DJ Hidden and Eye-D. Some years later the two released the slower tempo material they'd been producing in the meantime on Black Monolith Records and Otaku Records. These were noticed by Patrick van Kerckhoven, who offered the two a chance to run their own label under his Cardiac Music umbrella company in 2003. The label they started, Genosha Recordings, quickly grew into one of the most successful, influential and respected 'experimental industrial' hardcore labels in the hardcore music scene.

== Music style ==
The Outside Agency's musical style is not easily characterized, as they produce a wide variety of hardcore that draws influences from several other genres. They also produce their music at extremely varied tempos, ranging from 110 to 280 BPM. The only elements that are utilized consistently are the dark, brooding atmospheres that both artists add to their music.

Although they have collaborated on several tracks, the bulk of their output is produced by an individual member of the group.

One of the styles that the two have gained particular notice for is 'crossbreed', because they wanted to see if they could influence other people to start using it. The two had always used drum & bass influences in both their own hardcore productions as well as their DJ sets, but the later releases on Genosha Recordings and some of their guest-releases on other labels had grown beyond mere influence. The tracks had turned into full hybrids of hardcore and drum & bass. Nitzinsky and Wessels decided to take it to the next level by giving this new style a name: crossbreed; and they started a sister label to Genosha Recordings with the specific purpose to release crossbreed music: Genosha One Seven Five. This was the first label of its kind and its releases were successfully picked up by both drum & bass and hardcore DJs. Crossbreed is now widely accepted as a genre and other labels and producers active in the genre have surfaced.

Despite crossbreed's popularity, The Outside Agency have not confined themselves to producing it. This is evidenced by their 2012 album The Dogs Are Listening on the German Ad Noiseam label, which only features two tracks that could be described as crossbreed and sees the duo touching on all styles and tempos they have produced in the past as well as new ones.

== DJ performances ==
The Outside Agency regularly performs DJ sets at music events all over the world. They have in the past performed at reputable events such as Thunderdome, Decibel, Defqon.1, Q-Base, Therapy Sessions, Club r_AW and Mystery Land.

Their DJ sets are largely composed of their own material, although they also play some music from other artists.

== Discography ==
The following is a list of releases by The Outside Agency.

=== Singles & EPs ===
- 1996: The Outside Agency EP on Mokum Records
- 1997: The Case of the Black Bubbles on Mokum Records
- 1998: We Are As Fresh As Ice Is Cold on Mokum Records
- 2001: In Theory Everything Is Straight on Black Monolith Records
- 2003: The Art of Penetrating Without Penetrating on Black Monolith Records
- 2003: The Coconut Revolution on Otaku Records
- 2003: There Can Be Only None on Genosha Recordings
- 2003: Goes Noord vs. The Rest of the World on Genosha Recordings
- 2004: Weapons of Ass Destruction vol. 3 on Genosha Recordings
- 2005: Flip-Flops in the Mosh Pit on Genosha Recordings
- 2005: Hostile Place (/w Celsius) on Epileptik Productions
- 2005: Screaming Phoenix VIP on Enzyme VIP
- 2005: Scenocide 101 Album Sampler with Awesome Title on Genosha Recordings
- 2005: Motherfucking Ants on Genosha Recordings
- 2005: Necropsych on 46 Records
- 2005: War in the 8th Dimension on Genosha Recordings
- 2006: 10 Inches of What? on Genosha Recordings
- 2006: The Neutralizing Agent on Provoke Records
- 2006: No, We Don’t Want You to Clap Your Fucking Hands on Genosha Recordings
- 2006: Brainpainter on Meta4 Recordings
- 2007: Our Fear on Aentitainment
- 2007: The Way of the Exploding Fist on Hong Kong Violence
- 2007: The Easy Money Remix EP on Genosha Recordings
- 2007: Return of the Revenge of the Dark Alley Space Vampires on Genosha Recordings
- 2007: Forever Is a Long Time Coming on Genosha Recordings
- 2008: Goes Noord vs The Rest of the World II on Genosha Recordings
- 2008: Un Titre En Francais Intensement Profond Et Compliqué Que Vous Ne Comprendrez Jamais on B2K Records
- 2009: Reality Collapse/Hell's Basement on Independenza Records
- 2009: The Quadrilogy EP on NGM Records
- 2009: Surreal / Chaos Theory on Genosha One Seven Five
- 2009: Return to the Point of No Return on Symp.TOM
- 2009: Scandinavian Chess on TNI
- 2010: Crossbreed Definition Series part 1 (/w Cooh and SPL) on Genosha One Seven Five
- 2010: Hardcore Beyond the Bone on Genosha Recordings
- 2010: Crossbreed Definition Series part 2 (/w Counterstrike and Donny) on Genosha One Seven Five
- 2010: The Solution / Wait Your Turn on Killing Sheep
- 2010: Crossbreed Definition Series part 3 (/w Current Value and Switch Technique) on Genosha One Seven Five
- 2010: Choice Mission on Meta4 Recordings
- 2010: The Flux Capacitor / Destruction on Smackdown Recordings
- 2011: Undermind / Pacifists (/w Sei2ure) on Genosha One Seven Five
- 2011: Primitive / Scintillate (/w DJ Hidden) on Sustained Records
- 2011: Unmade World on TNI
- 2011: Cross on Nekrolog1k Recordings
- 2011: The Moment on Union Recordings
- 2012: Favorite Sin / This Never Happened (/w Peter Kurten & Katharsys and Forbidden Society) on Genosha One Seven Five
- 2012: The Price Is Right / Ghetto Blast on PRSPCT XTRM
- 2012: The Disputed Kings of Industrial (w/ Ophidian) on Genosha Recordings
- 2012: Headphone Wisdom / Don't Fear the Darkness (w/ DJ Hidden) on Union Recordings
- 2012: Perfect Organism (w/ Sinister Souls) on PRSPCT Recordings
- 2013: Einstein / Tesla (w/ DJ Hidden) on Future Sickness Records
- 2013: Goes Noord Vs The Rest Of The World III (w/ Fracture 4, Broken Rules, Dep Affect and Sei2ure) on Genosha Recordings
- 2014: Now This Is Crossbreed Vol. 10 on Genosha One Seven Five
- 2015: Prepare to Die / Borrowed Time on Genosha One Seven Five
- 2015: Der Remaken on Genosha Recordings
- 2015: Just Noise / My Design on Genosha One Seven Five
- 2015: The Future Is No on Genosha Recordings
- 2015: Bloed, Zweet & Snaren on Genosha One Seven Five
- 2015: The Easy Money Remix EP 2: More Easy Money on Genosha Recordings
- 2016: The Easy Money Remix EP 3: The Most Easy Money on Genosha Recordings
- 2016: Cause An Effect on Genosha One Seven Five
- 2017: Blue Stories on Heresy Recordings
- 2017: Goes Noord Vs. The Rest Of The World IV on Genosha Recordings
- 2017: Today's Tomorrow / The Violence on Genosha One Seven Five
- 2018: Return of The Silence on Genosha Recordings
- 2018: The Legacy Of Cain / I Saw My Grave on Genosha One Seven Five
- 2018: Everything Is Fine on Othercide Recordings
- 2019: Resurgence EP on Nekrolog1k Recordings
- 2020: Stories From The 9th Dimension on Genosha Recordings
- 2020: The Opposites / More Primitive on Genosha One Seven Five
- 2021: Operation Mindflash EP on Oblivion Underground Recordings
- 2021: The Hardcore Party EP on PRSPCT Recordings
- 2022: Operation Thunderbolt on Sealand Recordings
- 2023: Crossbreed Definition Series Part 4 on Genosha One Seven Five
- 2023: Machine Visions on Karnage Records
- 2023: Khaoz Engine - Most Broken (The Outside Agency Remix) On Motormouth Recordz
- 2024: Future Wars on Genosha Recordings
- 2024: The Dynamic Overpressure EP on PRSPCT Recordings
- 2025: Crossbreed Definition Series Part 5 on Genosha One Seven Five
- 2025: Touch The Darkness Remixes on Mokum Records

=== Albums ===
- 2005: Scenocide 101 (2xCD) on Genosha Recordings
- 2010: Scenocide 202 (2xCD) on Genosha Recordings
- 2012: The Dogs Are Listening (CD+G) on Ad Noiseam
- 2017: Scenocide 404 (2xCD) on Genosha Recordings
