= Enzyme Records =

Enzyme Records is a Dutch hardcore techno record label founded in 2001 by producer and DJ Patrick van Kerckhoven, professionally known as DJ Ruffneck. The label releases music spanning hardcore techno, gabber, darkcore and industrial hardcore. Its catalogue includes recordings by Endymion, Nosferatu, Ophidian, Mindustries, Weapon X and Sei2ure.

== History ==
=== Establishment and early development ===
Enzyme Records was established in 2001 by Dutch hardcore producer Patrick van Kerckhoven, better known as DJ Ruffneck. It followed his earlier involvement with the record labels Gangsta Audiovisuals and Supreme Intelligence Records.

The label developed a catalogue encompassing both melodic hardcore and darker, more experimental forms of the genre. A 2006 review in the Dutch dance music publication Partyflock identified the tracks "Butterfly", "Prednison Attack" and "Drunk with a Gun" among its earlier releases, describing Enzyme as an established name within the hardcore scene.

Artists associated with the label during its early years included Ruffneck, Endymion, Nosferatu, Ophidian, Hamunaptra, Mindustries, Nexes and D-Dr!ve. The label subsequently released material by additional producers including Sei2ure, Synapse and Project Omeaga.

=== Musical development ===
Enzyme Records became associated with a range of styles within hardcore electronic music, including mainstream hardcore, darkcore and industrial hardcore. Its releases frequently combined melodic arrangements with harsher percussion, experimental sound design and industrial influences.

The label's producers also collaborated extensively. Among the collaborations documented on Enzyme Injection 5 were tracks by Nosferatu and Endymion, Ruffneck and Mindustries, Ruffneck and Ophidian, and Ruffneck and Sei2ure.

=== Enzyme X ===
Enzyme X is a recording project associated with Enzyme Records, known for its darker and more experimental hardcore productions. Recordings credited to Enzyme X appeared throughout the label's compilation releases, often without individual producer credits.

The project featured prominently on Enzyme Injection 4 and Enzyme Injection 5, including tracks such as "God's Child", "Illuminati", "Hypothermia", "Mastodont", "Blood Omen" and "Kegadoru".

== Artists ==
Enzyme Records has released music by numerous hardcore producers and groups since its establishment. Its catalogue includes both solo artists and collaborative projects, with several producers working across multiple styles of hardcore music.

=== Associated artists ===
- DJ Ruffneck
- Endymion
- Nosferatu
- Ophidian
- Mindustries
- Weapon X
- Sei2ure
- Hamunaptra
- Nexes
- Synapse
- Project Omeaga
- Meagashira
- D-Dr!ve
- The Outside Agency
- Miss Twilight
- Decipher & Shinra

The list reflects artists historically associated with the label or featured in its releases and does not necessarily represent its current roster.

== Releases and compilations ==
=== Enzyme Injection ===
The label released a series of compilation albums titled Enzyme Injection, showcasing productions by artists associated with Enzyme Records. The compilations featured a combination of full-length tracks and DJ mixes.

Enzyme Injection 4, reviewed in May 2006, was a two-disc compilation featuring twelve full-length tracks alongside a mix by Ophidian. Its contributing artists included Nosferatu, Endymion, Hamunaptra, Nexes, Ruffneck, Mindustries, Synapse and Sei2ure.

The album received a score of 73 out of 100 from Partyflock, which highlighted the compilation's combination of melodic and darker hardcore material.

Enzyme Injection 5, released in 2008, consisted of three discs: a collection of twelve full-length tracks, a mix by Endymion and a mix by Ophidian.

The compilation featured productions and collaborations involving Nosferatu, Endymion, Weapon X, Project Omeaga, Mindustries, Ruffneck, Ophidian, Sei2ure and other artists. Its mixes also featured numerous Enzyme X recordings.

Reviewing the compilation in December 2008, Partyflock awarded it 93 out of 100, praising its combination of hardcore and darkcore productions.

=== Enzyme Incubation ===
The label was also associated with the Enzyme Incubation series of hardcore music events and compilations.

In February 2009, Enzyme Incubation – The Third Injection was released in conjunction with an event at Turbinenhalle in Oberhausen, Germany.

The double-disc compilation included separate mixes by Weapon X and Mindustries, reflecting contrasting approaches to hardcore music. The Weapon X mix concentrated on more conventional hardcore productions, while Mindustries explored darker and more experimental material.

The compilation received a score of 89 out of 100 from Partyflock.

=== Divine Intervention ===
In 2010, Enzyme Records released Ruffneck's Divine Intervention in a USB-drive edition designed in the shape of the label's logo.

The release featured collaborative recordings involving Ruffneck and other producers, including Ophidian, Nosferatu, Endymion, Mindustries, Sei2ure and Miss Twilight.

The USB edition also contained additional material, including artwork, sample packs and a music video. It was reviewed by Partyflock in July 2010, receiving a score of 93 out of 100.

== Events and anniversary ==
Enzyme Records has been associated with dedicated hardcore events, including the Enzyme Incubation and Enzyme Outbreak series. The event archive maintained by Partyflock documents Enzyme-associated events in the Netherlands and Germany.

In May 2026, Dutch electronic music publication Hard News announced that Ruffneck and Ophidian were scheduled to present a special performance commemorating 25 years of Enzyme Records at Resonate – The Core Collision.

The performance, advertised as "Ruffneck vs. Ophidian presents 25 Years of Enzyme Records", was scheduled for 21 November 2026 at the Autotron in Rosmalen, Netherlands.

== See also ==
- Hardcore techno
- Gabber
- Industrial hardcore
- List of record labels
