= Eye-D =

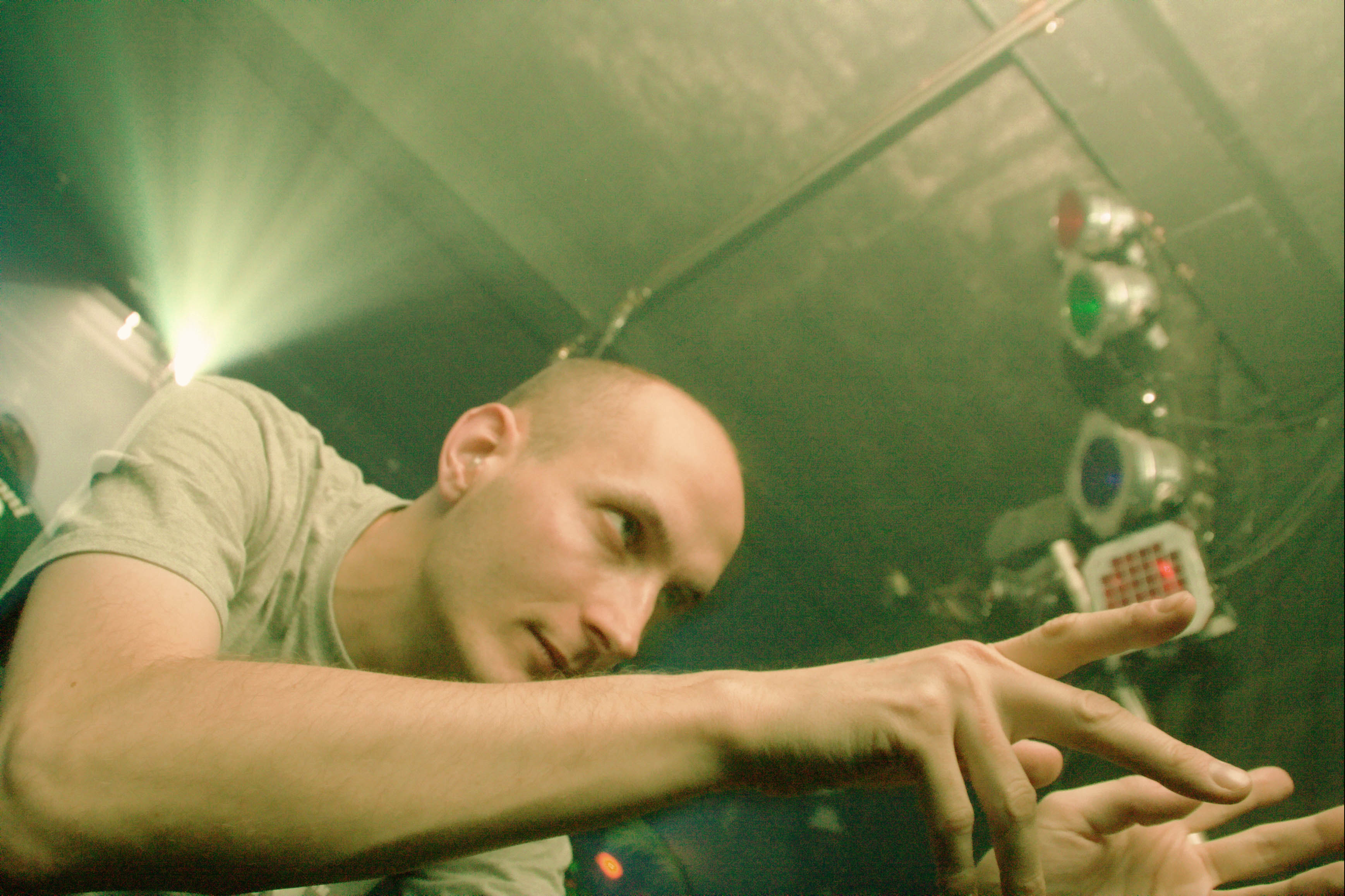
- Eye-D performing in Austria, 2006.

Background information
- Born: Frank Nitzinsky; 14 October 1974 (age 51)
- Origin: Goes, The Netherlands
- Genres: Drum & bass
- Occupations: DJ, producer, musician, teacher
- Years active: 1996 – Present
- Labels: Aural Carnage, Black Monolith Breaks, Black Sun Empire Recordings, Citrus Recordings, Def Wish Records, Eupholus Records, Evol Intent Records, Fear Records, Ghetto Safari, Hollow Point, Independenza Records, Kultbox Records, Lost Soul Recordings, Low Res Records, Piruh Recordings, PRSPCT Recordings, Ruff-Teck Records, Semiconscious Media, Soothsayer Recordings
- Website: www.eye-d.org

Frank Nitzinsky (born 14 October 1974), better known by his stage name, Eye-D, is a Dutch drum & bass producer and DJ based in Goes, The Netherlands. He is one-half of hardcore duo, The Outside Agency, alongside DJ Hidden.

== History ==
Eye-D has been an active drum & bass and hardcore DJ/producer since 1991. His professional musical career began with a hardcore release on Mokum Records in 1996. His first drum & bass releases were issued by Kultbox Records in 1998.

== Music ==
Eye-D's musical style is best characterized by its hardcore influences. He has released drum & bass music on record labels such as PRSPCT Recordings, Lost Soul Recordings, Evol Intent Recordings, Black Sun Empire Recordings and Ruff-Teck Records. He has collaborated with artists such as SPL, Black Sun Empire, Counterstrike, and Evol Intent. Eye-D collaborates very frequently with DJ Hidden with whom he forms The Outside Agency. Since the release of The Outside Agency's first EP on Black Monolith Records in 2001, the 'Eye-D' moniker has been limited to his drum & bass material.

== DJ performances ==
Eye-D regularly performs at musical events internationally, both as Eye-D and as part of The Outside Agency. In the Netherlands, Eye-D and DJ Hidden are frequent guests at underground club nights PRSPCT and Smackdown.

== Discography ==
The following is a list drum & bass releases by Eye-D. For hardcore releases, see The Outside Agency on Discogs.com.

=== Singles & EPs ===
- 1998: We Eat Tulips for Breakfast EP on Kultbox Records
- 1999: Down from the Waist Up (Slipgevaar / Eye Design) on Ghetto Safari
- 1999: Evil Eye / Enemies on Def Wish Records
- 1999: Sabor Natural de Coco (Armalyte / 640K) (with Kid Entropy) on Black Monolith Breaks
- 2000: Uridium on Ruff-Teck Records
- 2000: Wireless (with Kid Entropy) / Unicorn MF on Piruh Recordings
- 2001: Hidden Bassline on Piruh Recordings
- 2002: Metric (with Atomly) on Fear Records
- 2003: 707 on Semiconscious Media
- 2003: Unicorn MF (Black Sun Empire Remix) on Citrus Recordings
- 2004: James Brown / Station on Ruff-Teck Records
- 2005: Eye-D & Kid Entropy – 640K (DJ Hidden Remix) on Soothsayer Recordings
- 2006: Motherfucking Skulls (with Counterstrike) on PRSPCT Recordings
- 2007: Joshua's War (with DJ Hidden) on PRSPCT Recordings
- 2007: The Grind (with Counterstrike) on PRSPCT Recordings
- 2008: Caffeine Overdose '97 (with Squee) on Independenza Recordings
- 2008: Domino / Brimstone on PRSPCT Recordings
- 2008: Time War / Rock & Roll (with Evol Intent) on Evol Intent Recordings
- 2009: Circuitry (with Squee) on PRSPCT Recordings
- 2009: Milkshake / Brainfreeze (with Black Sun Empire) on Black Sun Empire Recordings
- 2010: Masters of Rave (with SPL) on Hollow Point
- 2010: Kings of the Universe EP (with SPL) on Lost Soul Recordings
- 2012: Incoming (with SPL) on Hollow Point
- 2013: Mission Statement on PRSPCT Recordings

=== Albums ===
- 2011: Peer to Peer Pressure (with DJ Hidden) on PRSPCT Recordings

=== Remixes ===
- 2002: Theeq – A15E (Eye-D Remix) on Low Res Records
- 2003: Black Sun Empire – Skin Deep (Eye-D Remix) on Citrus Recordings
- 2004: Murder Was the Case – Murder Was the Case (Eye-D Remix) on Murder / Eupholus Records
- 2005: Ancronix – Shadow Force (Eye-D Remix) on Soothsayer Recordings
- 2005: Bombardier – Syn (Eye-D Remix) on Low Res Records
- 2005: Kid Entropy – So Far (Eye-D Remix) on Citrus Recordings
- 2006: Aggroman – The Dark Side of the Moon (DJ Hidden & Eye-D Remix) on Aural Carnage
- 2009: DJ Hidden – The Narrators (Eye-D Remix) on Ad Noiseam

== See also ==
- List of drum & bass artists
- List of drum & bass record labels
