= Terminal 11 =

American musician

Michael Castaneda, better known by his alias Terminal 11, is an American electronic musician from Tempe, Arizona, US. His music producing style is generally considered as breakcore/flashcore.

Castaneda has appeared on numerous underground electronic labels, including Phthalo, Cock Rock Disco, Hymen Records, Ad Noiseam, Digital Vomit Records, Mutant Sniper and others. His music is characterized by frenetic, impossibly fast tempos and a machine-gun fire spattering of unidentifiable samples.

Castaneda has toured Europe and the United States extensively.

His 2007 album Fractured Sunshine spawned an animated music video for the track "The Bird's Midair Heatstroke".

== Selected discography ==
- Speed Modified (Phthalo Records, 2001)
- Don Maximo/Postmod Premax (Phthalo Records, 2003)
- Illegal Nervous Habits (Cock Rock Disco, 2005)
- Additions To Arsenal (Phthalo Records, 2006)
- Fractured Sunshine (Hymen Records, 2007)
- Kaleidoscope Eyes (Cock Rock Disco, 2009)
- Self Exorcism (Hymen Records, 2012)
