= Let's Eat =

Let's Eat may refer to:

- Let's Eat (TV series), a 2013 South Korean television series
- Let's Eat 2, a 2015 South Korean television series
- Let's Eat 3, a 2018 South Korean television series
- Let's Eat (album), a 2010 album by The Wiggles
- Let's Eat, a 1999 album by Love/Hate
- Let's Eat, a 2004 album by Sanctum
- Let's Eat! (film), a 2016 Singaporean-Malaysian comedy film
- "Let's Eat!", an episode of Barney & Friends
- "Let's Eat", a song by Macklemore & Ryan Lewis from This Unruly Mess I've Made
