= DJ Hidden =

Dutch DJ (born 1975)

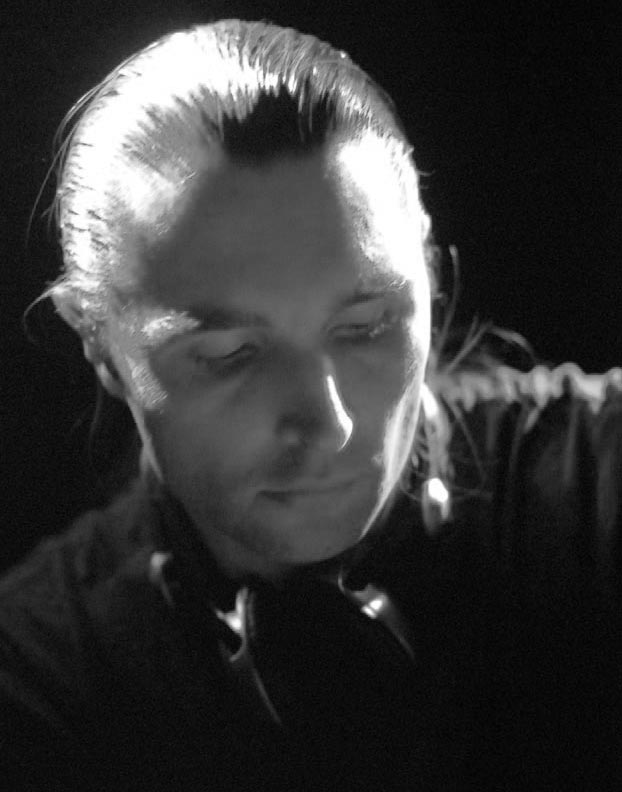
- DJ Hidden at "Rebellion Start" @ Black Box, Sofia, Bulgaria

Background information
- Also known as: DJ Hidden
- Born: Noël Wessels; 19 May 1975 (age 51)
- Origin: Goes, Netherlands
- Genres: Electronic music
- Occupations: Musician; DJ; record producer; designer
- Years active: 1996–present
- Website: djhidden.com

DJ Hidden is an electronic music producer and DJ from Goes, Netherlands. His solo work consists of (Experimental) Drum & Bass, IDM and Crossbreed. He is one-half of Industrial Hardcore/Crossbreed duo, The Outside Agency, alongside Eye-D.

== History ==
Wessels has been an active drum & bass and hardcore DJ and producer since 1991. His music career began in 1996, with the release of The Outside Agency EP on hardcore label Mokum Records. His first drum & bass track was released on Kultbox Records in 1998. Wessels has since released drum & bass music on record labels such as PRSPCT Recordings, Killing Sheep Records, Evol Intent Recordings, Outbreak Records, Ad Noiseam, Ruff-Teck Records, and many others.

He has released three full-length conceptual albums under this moniker entitled The Later After , The Words Below and Enclosed on the German label Ad Noiseam, as well as a joint album release with Eye-D entitled Peer To Peer Pressure and two solo albums The Nightmare Connector and The Reimagineers on PRSPCT Recordings and Isoclusion on his own Hidden Tracks label. He also releases modern classical/IDM music under the moniker Semiomime, techno as Scørch and My_Initials on his techno label ScanDark Recordings and "new early hardcore" as Dysistor.

=== Collaborations ===
In addition to his solo releases, Wessels has collaborated with Cooh, Counterstrike, Evol Intent, Forbidden Society. He frequently collaborates with Eye-D, with whom he also forms the hardcore outfit The Outside Agency. Since the release of The Outside Agency's first EP on Black Monolith Records in 2001, Wessels has used the "DJ Hidden" moniker solely for his drum & bass releases.

== Discography ==
The following is a list of all of Wessels' drum & bass releases.

=== Albums ===
- 2007: The Later After on Ad Noiseam
- 2009: The Words Below on Ad Noiseam
- 2011: Peer to Peer Pressure (with Eye-D) on PRSPCT Recordings
- 2013: Enclosed on Ad Noiseam
- 2015: P [ L ] A Y L I S T (Compilation Album) on Hidden Tracks
- 2015: Directive on Ad Noiseam/Hidden Tracks
- 2019: The Nightmare Connector on PRSPCT Recordings
- 2021: Isoclusion on Hidden Tracks
- 2022: The Reimagineers on PRSPCT Recordings
- 2025: Re:Percussions Part I (Compilation Album) on Hidden Tracks
- 2026: Re:Percussions Part II (Compilation Album) on Hidden Tracks

=== Singles and EPs ===
- 1998: We Eat Tulips for Breakfast EP on Kultbox Records
- 2000: Darkstreet Jazz / Sabre on Abstrakt Recordings
- 2000: Untitled on Virtual Pulse Records
- 2000: Ender / Uridium on Ruff-teck
- 2001: Tsji-LP / People Are Programmed on Semiconscious Media
- 2001: Incantation on Piruh
- 2002: Thanatos on Fear Records
- 2002: Fear 003 on Fear Records
- 2002: The Wrong Way / Anamnesia on Ruff-Teck
- 2002: Solid Tactics / Left-Ledge on Theoretic Records
- 2002: Hidden / Scared on Fear Records
- 2003: Afterglow on Ruff-Teck
- 2004: It Begins on Killing Sheep Records
- 2004: Ghost Story / The Surface on Metrik
- 2004: Personality Disorder E.P. on Theoretic Records
- 2004: Black Blood / Sonogrammar on Ruff-Teck Records
- 2004: Where's The Score? (with Slacknote) on Evol Intent
- 2005: The Resonators on Prspct
- 2005: Death at a Distance EP on Outbreak Records
- 2005: Wastelands on Ruff-Teck
- 2006: Literal Evil on Killing Sheep Records
- 2006: Prisoner of One Self / Masque De Mort on Dust of Sounds
- 2006: Times Like These on Killing Sheep Records
- 2006: The Gehenna Device / Corrupt on Sub/Version
- 2006: Dead Silence on Fear Records
- 2007: Consumed (with Forbidden Society) on Hardline Rekordingz
- 2007: Joshua's War (with Eye-D) on PRSPCT Recordings
- 2007: After Before on Ad Noiseam
- 2008: Past The Flesh / Prayer's End on Killing Sheep Records
- 2008: Faust Pact on Independenza Records
- 2008: We Are Haunted / The Signs on Prspct
- 2008: Sandwaves / Session 113 (Saw Darkness in You) on Flatline Ltd.
- 2009: The Words Below Limited Edition Vinyl Series Part 1 on Ad Noiseam
- 2009: The Words Below Limited Edition Vinyl Series Part 2 on Ad Noiseam
- 2009: The Memento Mori EP on Sustained Records
- 2009: Grim Noire on Bug Klinik Records
- 2009: Untitled on Nekrolog1k Recordings
- 2009: The Unseen on Mentally Disturbed
- 2010: Imagination (with Switch Technique) on Union Recordings
- 2010: The Words Below Limited Edition Vinyl Series Part 3 on Ad Noiseam
- 2010: Empty Streets Revisited / Times Like These VIP on Killing Sheep Records
- 2011: Scintillate on Sustained Records
- 2011: The Outsider Looking In on Tantrum Recordings
- 2011: You're Not Real / Breathe in Breathe Out on Hidden Tracks
- 2012: Existence (with Broken Note) on Ad Noiseam
- 2012: Don't Fear The Darkness on Union Recordings
- 2013: Lights Off: Only You Can See with vocals from Anneke Van Giersbergen of The Gathering on Hidden Tracks
- 2013: Einstein / Tesla on Future Sickness Records
- 2015: Directive Album Sampler #1 on Hidden Tracks
- 2015: Directive Album Sampler #2 on Hidden Tracks
- 2015: Evah Green EP on PRSPCT Recordings
- 2017: The Place That Did Not Exist on Kosenprod
- 2017: This World on Othercide Records
- 2022: Circuit's Edge on Hidden Tracks
- 2022: Devine Chances on Hidden Tracks
- 2022: PRSPCT MF on PRSPCT Recordings
- 2024: Poseidon EP (Together with Landscapers & 2methyl) on Hidden Tracks
- 2024: The White Mountain EP on PRSPCT Recordings

=== Remixes ===
- 2004: Censor – Grey Line Reality (DJ Hidden Remix) on Hive Records
- 2005: Censor – Grey Line Reality (DJ Hidden VIP Remix) on Handsome Devil Recordings
- 2005: Eye-D & Kid Entropy – 640K (DJ Hidden Remix) on Soothsayer Recordings
- 2006: Enduser – The Catalyst (DJ Hidden Remix) on Ad Noiseam
- 2006: Aggroman – The Dark Side of the Moon (Eye-D & DJ Hidden Remix) on Aural Carnage
- 2007: Detritus – Interrupted (DJ Hidden Remix) on Ad Noiseam
- 2007: City of God – C'est Mon Monde (DJ Hidden Remix) on Independenza Records
- 2007: Forbidden Society – Demons (DJ Hidden Remix) on Independenza Records
- 2007: CDatakill – No Brakes (Remix By DJ Hidden) on Ad Noiseam
- 2007: DJ G-I-S & Norman Wax – Leatherface (DJ Hidden Remix) on Intransigent Recordings
- 2007: Xanopticon – Symptom (DJ Hidden Remix) on Thac0 Records
- 2008: Fractional – En Attendant (DJ Hidden Remix) on Brume Records
- 2008: Autoclav1.1 – Small Days (Broken By DJ Hidden) on Hive Records
- 2009: Enduser – Manoeuvre (DJ Hidden RMX) on Soothsayer Recordings
- 2010: DJ Hidden – The Devil's Instant (DJ Hidden's Other Side Remix) on Ad Noiseam
- 2011: Rregula & Dementia – Into My Mind (DJ Hidden Remix) on Trust in Music
- 2011: Cativo – Evil Has No Boundaries (DJ Hidden Remix) on Nekrolog1k Recordings
- 2012: DJ G-I-S & Norman Wax – Leatherface (DJ Hidden Remix) on Intransigent Recordings
- 2013: MachineCode – Forsaken (DJ Hidden RMX) on Subsistenz
- 2015: Hostage – Corporal Punishment (Hidden Remix) on Therapy Sessions Recordings
- 2016: Brainpain - Humans (DJ Hidden Remix) on OtherCide Records
- 2018: Circle of Dust - Machines Of Our Disgrace (DJ Hidden Remix) on FiXT
- 2018: Triamer & Nagato - Hands Up (DJ Hidden Remix) on TriaMer Recordings
- 2019: Meander - Stranger (DJ Hidden Remix) on PRSPCT Recordings

== DJ performances ==
In addition to a busy production schedule, DJ Hidden still finds the time to regularly perform at events across the world, both as DJ Hidden and as part of The Outside Agency. In the Netherlands, DJ Hidden and Eye-D are frequent guests at prominent underground club nights "PRSPCT" and "Smackdown". Wessels has performed in Australia, Austria, Belarus, Belgium, Czech Republic, England, Estonia, France, Germany, Hungary, Italy, Japan, Lithuania, Latvia, Luxembourg, Poland, Portugal, Romania, Russia, Scotland, Slovakia, Spain, Sweden, Switzerland, Ukraine, Bulgaria and the United States.
