= Mathis Mootz =

German DJ

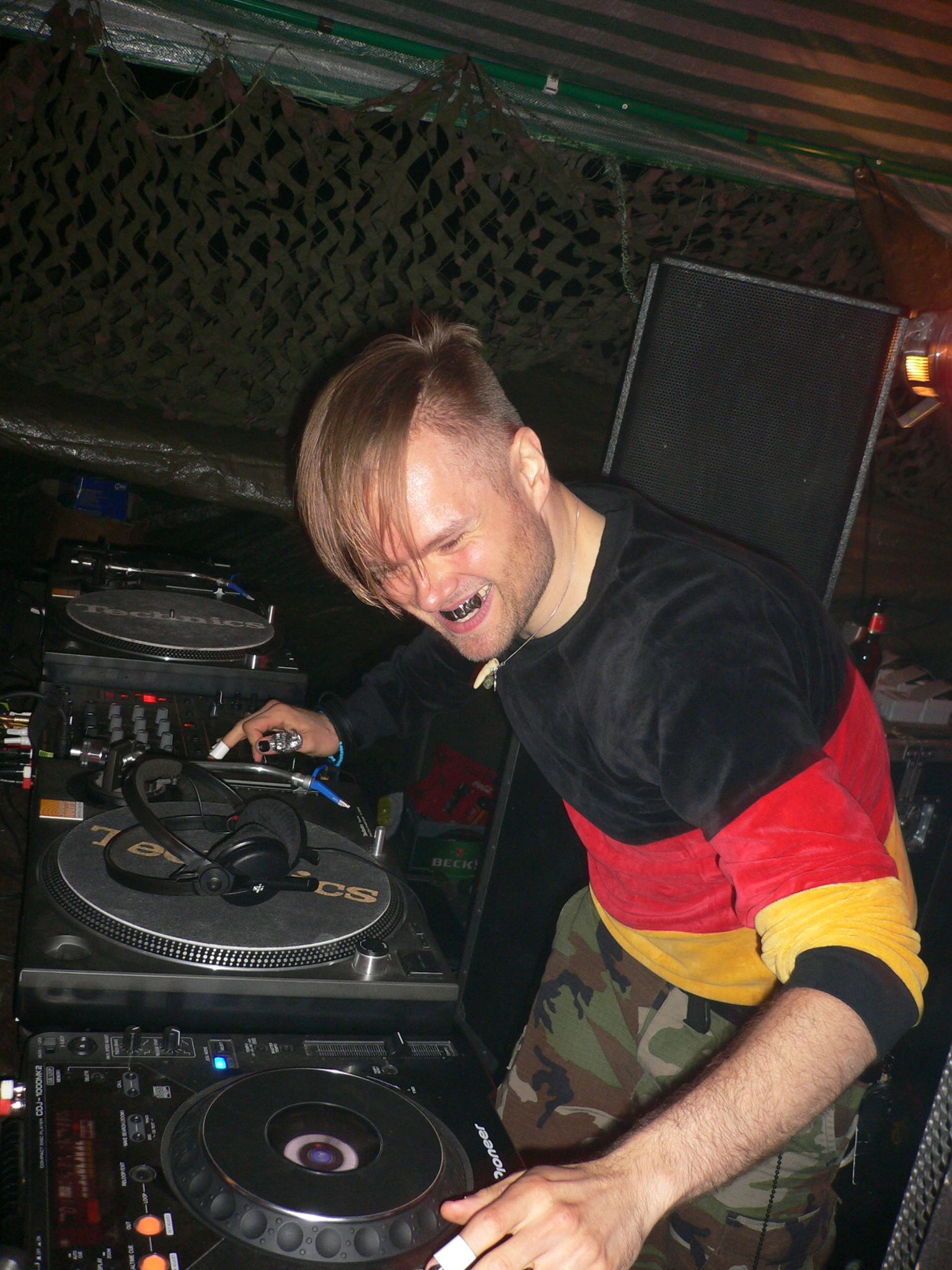
- The Panacea deejaying in 2006.

Background information
- Also known as: Panacea; The Panacea m^{2} (Squaremeter); Bad Street Boy; Kate Mosh; Rich Kid
- Born: August 19, 1976 (age 49)
- Origin: Wetzlar, Germany
- Genres: Drum and bass, techstep, ambient, darkcore, darkstep, digital hardcore, breakcore
- Occupations: Producer, remixer, DJ
- Years active: 1996–present
- Labels: Position Chrome; Ant-Zen; Offkey

Mathis Mootz is a prolific German electronic musician and DJ. Mootz is best known as The Panacea (until 2005, simply as Panacea), his drum and bass stage name and main musical project, and as m^{2} (pronounced "Squaremeter"), his dark ambient side project and alter-ego.

Born August 18, 1976 in Wetzlar, Germany, Mootz served an apprenticeship in classical music and was a member of the boy's choir of Windsbach. After studying music engineering at the SAE Institute, Mootz worked with the experimental hip hop/illbient label Chrome, an offshoot of Force Inc Music Works. Over the course of several drum and bass albums and many singles, and as A&R manager for Chrome, later renamed Position Chrome, Panacea became known for pushing the bounds of the drum and bass genre into industrial and hardcore territory, and for energetic DJ sets which fused these genres in a live setting. With his side project m^{2}, he explored a more minimal side of electronic music, first in the realm of clicks 'n' cuts, and later in the dark ambient territory pioneered by the likes of Lustmord. Mootz lives and produces in Sommerhausen, a countryside town near Würzburg.

== The Panacea ==
Mootz experimented with hip hop/illbient in the mid-1990s, an offshoot of Force Inc Music Works. Under the name Panacea, he released a string of dark drum and bass singles on the label in 1996, followed by the LPs Low Profile Darkness in 1997 and Twisted Designz in 1998, which pushed the tech step format established by the UK's Ed Rush and Nico Sykes into harsh industrial/digital hardcore territory. Mootz took over Chrome's A&R, and the label was renamed Position Chrome soon after (the label is now under ownership by Mootz), evolving into one of the first and most notable German drum and bass labels.

Mootz's broad musical background led him to experiment in other style, from the avant garde minimalism of his Brasília soundtrack (part of Caipirinha's Architettura series exploring the relationship between architecture and music), to his collaboration with J-pop singer Hanayo, which saw the duo electronically re-scoring Bach's Ich steh an deiner Krippen hier. A number of MCs guested on his LP Phoenix Metabolism (1999), while he refined his industrial drum and bass style on the LP German Engineering (2001). Mootz also began a number of side projects and collaborations in this period, releasing albums of raggacore (as Rich Kid), electro (as Bad Street Boy), hardcore techno (as Kate Mosh), and drum and bass with DJ Scud (as The Redeemer) and Problem Child (as Disorder). Sinecore, the first album by his glitch/dark ambient ego m^{2} (pronounced "Squaremeter") was released in 2000 on Mille Plateaux. A further ten albums were released by this project coming over labels such as Ant-Zen and Hands Productions.

The Hardest Tour on Planet Earth (2001) documented his partnership with fellow German drum and bass artist Cativo, where elements of oldskool hardcore began entering his products. Underground Superstar (2002) found him fusing early hardcore and jump-up with modern production techniques. The album included "The Evil Seed", a vocal track for which a music video was produced, and "The Last Brotherhood". Adopting an extremely energetic DJ persona, he became known for sets that were equal parts hardcore and drum and bass. He also began collaborating with Luna-C, one of the champions of the breakbeat hardcore revival known as hardcore breaks. Panacea Shares Needles with Tarmvred, a collaboration with Needle Sharing and Tarmvred in 2002 on Ad Noiseam, combined drum and bass, hardcore, and noise.

Position Chrome ceased activity briefly in 2004 when Force Inc.'s distributors EFA-Medien went bankrupt, but in 2005, Mootz revived the label, changing his name to The Panacea. He has since returned to somewhat darker sounds, releasing a number of singles on Position Chrome, as well as UK labels Outbreak and Offkey Records, the latter run by UK producer Raiden and specializing in Techno-DNB.

Currently, The Panacea is part of the Anger Management booking agency roster as well as Freak Recordings, which led him to headline several events of the Therapy Sessions franchise. Since 2016 he collaborates with artist David Frisch on the techno project New Frames, co-running the labels "Continuum Series 1991-1998" and "Sistema Records".

Discography

- Low Profile Darkness (Chrome, 1997)
- Twisted Designz (Position Chrome, 1998)
- Hanayo in Panacea (Mille Plateaux, 1999) with Hanayo
- Phoenix Metabolism (Position Chrome, 1999)
- Architettura Vol 4 - Brasilia (Caipirinha Productions, 2000)
- German Engineering (Position Chrome, 2001)
- The Hardest Tour on Planet Earth (Position Chrome, 2001) with Cativo
- Underground Superstardom (Position Chrome, 2002)
- Panacea Shares Needles With Tarmvred (Ad Noiseam, 2002) with Needle Sharing and Tarmvred
- Cryptonomicon EP (Position Chrome, 2007)
- Chiropteran (Position Chrome, 2010)

== m^{2} (Squaremeter) ==
m^{2} (pronounced "Squaremeter") is Mootz's main side-project, originally intended as a one off clicks n' cuts release for Mille Plateaux. Over the course of several albums on prominent industrial labels Ant-Zen and Hands Productions, m^{2} became more rhythmic-orientated and gothic in tone (featuring spoken word samples from a BBC radio adaptation of J. R. R. Tolkien's The Silmarillion), with prominent Arabic influences. The most recent releases eschewed the vocal samples, digital edits and heavy industrial rhythms in favour of spacious soundscapes and dark, brooding ambient in the vein of pioneers such as Lustmord. m^{2} also performs live at events such as Maschinenfest.

Discography

- Sinecore (Mille Plateaux, 2000)
- 14id1610s (Ant-Zen, 2000)
- Mono Brutal (Hands Productions, 2000) as Needle Sharing vs. m^{2}
- Parsec (Hands Productions, 2001)
- Kopyright Liberation (Ant-Zen, 2001)
- This Anxious Space (Hymen Records, 2001) as xhm^{2} (a collaboration with Xingu Hill)
- The Bitter End (Hands Productions, 2002)
- War Of Sound (Ant-Zen, 2003)
- Aswad (Ant-Zen, 2004)
- The Frozen Spark (Ant-Zen, 2005)
- Nyx (Ant-Zen, 2006)
- Heliogabal (Ant-Zen, 2010)
