= Proyecto Mirage =

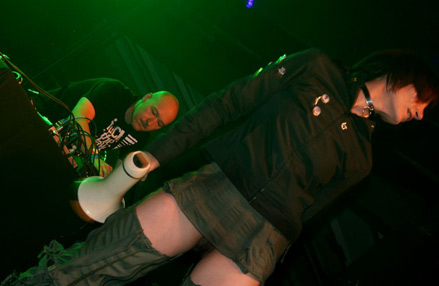
- Proyecto Mirage live

Background information
- Origin: Madrid, España
- Genres: techno, electro, industrial, Powernoise, Noise music
- Years active: 1990–present
- Labels: Hands Productions; Ant-Zen
- Members: Alicia H. Willen; Francisco Planellas
- Website: www.proyecto-mirage.com

Proyecto Mirage is an electronic music duo from Madrid.

== Full Time Albums ==
Proyecto Mirage, Hands Productions –1999
Two tons of Rubble, Hands Productions – 2001
Two tons of Rubble-Box, (limited edition) Hands Productions – 2001
Do not look at me –Picture Vinil (limited edition) – 2002
Gas Alarm, Hands Productions – 2004
Gimme Your Energy, Hands Productions – 2006
Gas the DJ, Mindstrike Records – 2006
Turn it on, Ant–Zen – 2008

== Compilations ==
Waveland album, Waveland –1995, ES
Radar live act ..CD1 –1997, ES
Radar live act ..CD2 –1998, ES
Iberica Electronica, Brainwaves –1999, ES
Re–activated, Caustic Records, 1999, ES
Radar live act ..CD3 –1999, ES
Industrial Frecuencies vol 3, Orkus –2000, Ger
2000 Hands, Hands Productions –2000, Ger
Maschinenfest´00, Pflichtkauf –2000, Ger
Triton Compilation, Triton –2001, Ger
Laboratorio, Experimentaclub –2001, Es
Form of Hands, Hands Productions –2001, Ger
Maschinenfest´01, Pflichtkauf –2001, Ger
2001 Hands, Hands Productions –2001, Ger
Industrial Frecuencies vol 4, Orkus –2002, Ger
Ducasse, STKM –2002, Es
Form of Hands, Hands Productions –2003, Ger
Belio Compilation, Himen –2003, ES–GER
Against, Caustic Records –2003, ES
Tonal Destruction, DTA Records –2003, USA
Sonic Seducer (Cold Hands Seductions) –2003, Ger
Secuencie or die, Brainchaos –2003, Japan
Noise, Just do it, Invasion Wreck Chords –2004, Belarus
The Nein Raid, Nein Records –2004, USA
Maschinenfest´04, Pflichtkauf –2004, Ger
Fuckktop lp, Mindstrike –2005, Es
Wildcat ..72 – magazine– January 2005, Ger
2005 Hands, Hands Productions –2005, Ger
Form of Hands, Hands Productions –2005, Ger
Homenaje, Rackham records –2005, Es
The Scariest Weapon:3 –2005, Invasion Wreck Chords –2005, Belarus
Pandora's box – invasion and friends –2006, Invasion Wreck Chords –2006, Belarus
New Input Noise –2006, HellektroEmpire–2006, Italy
F** The Mainstream, Vampire Freaks / Alfa Matrix–2007, Belgium
Cut&Go, Invasion Wreck Chords–2007, Belarus
Caution! Invasion & Friends 2k7, Invasion Wreck Chords –2007 (DVD), Belarus
Tanzfront Compilation, Tanzfront –2008, Russia
Maschinenfest Compilation, Pflichtkauf–2008, Ger

== Mixes ==
Spate liebe, W.v. Zorn –2002, Austria
Belarus Teenage Action, Ambassador 21, –2003, Belarus
Scraped X, DTA –2003, USA
Philomenescus Cerverus, Epidemia –2003, USA
Trip Suspended, Matka, Spain –2003
Magic Drop, Dj Mauri –2004, Spain
Domination, Aseptic room, –2004, Spain
we declare Revolution, Ambassador 21, –2004, Belarus
Squelch Mc Arra Remix, Prometheus Burning, –2007, USA
Nuclear Device, Ctrler, –2007 Spain

== Other projects ==
PLACID
Skull of a pussy. CD full–time, Hands Productions –2002, Ger
Don't fuck with us, compilation, Digital Hardcore – 2002, USA
Maschinenfest´02, compilation, Maschinenfest – 2002, GER
2003 Hands, compilation, Hands Productions – 2003, GER
Form of Hands, Hands Productions – 2003, GER
Von der Friedhof–Allee, Zoomica Music – 2003, GER
Industrial Highlights 01, Zoomica Music – 2003, GER

BUBBLE GUM
She is Dancig..., 7´ Vinil, Bazooka–joe – 2002, Ger
Hidden addictions, CD, STKM – 2003, Es
Bershka, (compilation), El Diablo – 2003, Es
ElectroSpain(compilation), Subterfuge – 2004, Es

Sources: Official web / Francisco Planellas / http://www.ant–zen.com/act/act215.htm
