= Ad Noiseam =

German independent record label

- Founded: 2001
- Founder: Nicolas Chevreux
- Genre: Electronic, EDM, experimental
- Country of origin: Germany
- Location: Berlin
- Official website: www.adnoiseam.net

Ad Noiseam is an independent record label based in Berlin, Germany that has from 2001 onwards published electronic music in the form of breakcore, drum'n'bass, IDM, and dubstep, as well as hip-hop and jazz. Ad Noiseam was founded in April of 2001 by Nicolas Chevreux, who also has done some of the design work for the label's releases. Ad Noiseam originally started out as a webzine, but quickly moved on to being a record-label, establishing a name for itself with its first release "Krach Test" (adn 01). After releasing high quality, small batch (mini)-CDr releases, the label phased out the CDr's in favour of factory pressed CDs with 2001's "Subfusc" by Tarmvred, after which numerous releases on both vinyl and CD followed.

On top of the label activities, Ad Noiseam is also a mailorder and a distribution channel for both in-house and other labels' releases. Since 2001, Ad Noiseam has spread CDs and records to end customers, stores and other mailorders worldwide.

In 2011, Ad Noiseam celebrated its 10th anniversary with a festival held at the Berghain club, followed by a series of birthday concerts in more than 10 European countries. As of July 2016 the label is in a state of "deep freeze".

== Roster ==
Ad Noiseam has released music by the following artists:

- 2methyl
- Andrey Kiritchenko
- Antigen Shift
- Balkansky
- Black Lung
- Bong-Ra
- Broken Note
- Cakebuilder
- Cdatakill
- Dälek
- Detritus
- DJ Hidden
- Drumcorps
- Enduser
- Exillon
- Fausten
- Gore Tech
- Hecate
- Hecq
- Horchata
- Igorrr
- Iszoloscope
- Karsten Pflum
- Keef Baker
- Knifehandchop
- Lapsed
- Larvae
- Loopstepwalker
- Machinecode
- Mad EP
- Mago
- Matta
- Mobthrow
- Monolog
- Mothboy
- Needle Sharing
- Niveau Zero
- Oyaarss
- Panacea
- Raoul Sinier
- Roel Funcken
- Ruby My Dear
- Scorn
- Semiomime
- Shitmat
- Somatic Responses
- Subheim
- Swarm Intelligence
- Szkieve
- Tapage
- Tarmvred
- Techdiff
- The Kilimanjaro Darkjazz Ensemble
- The Mount Fuji Doomjazz Corporation
- The Outside Agency
- The Teknoist
- Underhill
- Whourkr
- Wilt
- Wormskull

== See also ==
- Breakcore
- Dubstep
- Maschinenfest
- Power noise
- List of record labels
