= Sheikh Aljama =

Studio album by Esplendor Geométrico
- Released: 1991 Belgium; 1994 Germany
- Recorded: 1991 Spain
- Genre: Industrial music
- Length: 44:44
- Label: Daft; Geometrik

Esplendor Geométrico chronology
Diez años de… (1990)	Sheikh Aljama (1991)	Arispejal astisaró (1993)

Sheikh Aljama is an album by Spanish industrial band Esplendor Geométrico, recorded at Al-Majriti Studio in Melilla (Spain), and released as CD by Daft Records in Belgium.

The title, meaning "Community's Sheikh" in Arabic, was the official title for the first president of the Córdoban Republic after the fall of the caliphate. The cover depicts a Muslim girl on the old Granada’s King throne at Alhambra fortress. Titles are in Spanish or Arabic languages, as well as names of the band and album are also written in Arabic.

== Track listing ==
1. "Baraca" – 4:40
2. "Trafica" – 7:20
3. "Introspección" – 5:45
4. "Medinati" – 4:30
5. "Descontrol" – 5:48
6. "Jeque de Aljama" – 4:30
7. "Min dahul" – 5:00
8. "Animatriz" – 4:01
9. "Sinaya" – 3:10

== Notes ==
Some notes in the album:

- In memorial to Abu al-Hazm ben Jahwar of Cordova
- Special thanks to Nizar Kabbani in “Jeque de Aljama” track
