= Raoul Sinier =

- Also known as: Ra
- Born: Raoul Sinier
- Origin: Paris
- Genres: Electronica, Hip hop, IDM
- Labels: Ad Noiseam, Sublight Records, Planet Mu, Coredump Records
- Website: www. raoulsinier.com

Raoul Sinier is a digital painter, film maker, writer and electronic musician based in Paris.

== Discography ==
=== as Ra ===
- 2004: Raoul Loves You (CD album, Coredump Records)
- 2007: Wxfdswxc2 (CD album + limited DVD, Sublight Records)
- 2007: Mad EP vs. Ra (UltraFood 12", Ad Noiseam)
- 2007: Ev.Panic Redone (CD EP & picture disc 12", Planet Mu)

==== as Raoul Sinier ====
- 2007: Two Heads (Mini CD EP, Disco r.Dance)
- 2007: Huge Samurai Radish (CD EP, Ad Noiseam)
- 2008: Ra Loves You Extended (Digital album reissue, Teams)
- 2008: Wxfdswxc2 Extended (Digital album reissue, Teams)
- 2008: Brain Kitchen (CD album, Ad Noiseam)
- 2009: Tremens Industry (CD album + DVD-video, Ad Noiseam)
- 2011: Cymbal Rush/Strange Teeth & Black Nails (12" EP, Oeuvre)
- 2011: The Melting Man (Digital EP, Tigerbeat6)
- 2011: Guilty Cloaks (CD album, Ad Noiseam)
- 2012: Covers (Digital EP, Self-publishing)
- 2013: Welcome to my Orphanage (CD album, Good Citizen Factory)
- 2014: Remixes (CD album, Self-publishing)
- 2015: Late Statues (CD album, Self-publishing)
- 2016: Descente (CD album, Self-publishing)
- 2018: Death, Love & Despair (CD album, Self-publishing)
- 2020: The Dollmaker Tales (12" album, Self-publishing)
- 2023: Dreams from the Assembly Line (CD album, Self-publishing)
- 2025: Army of Ghosts (12" album, Self-publishing)
