= Hanayo =

Japanese musician, photographer (born 1970)

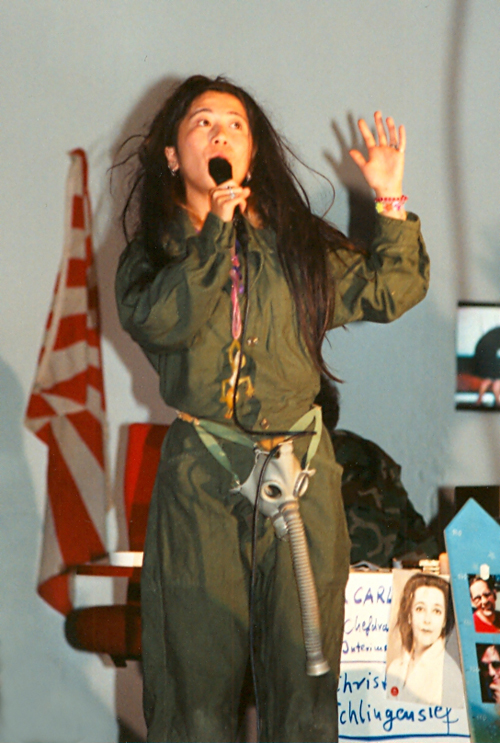

Background information
- Born: 1970 (age 55–56)
- Origin: Japan
- Genres: Electronica; Experimental; Noise; Alternative rock
- Occupations: Geisha; Musician; Artist; Photographer; Actress
- Years active: 1989–present
- Website: hanayo.com

Hanayo (花代), born Hanayo Nakajima (中島 花代, Nakajima Hanayo; born 1970), is a Japanese musician, photographer and artist known for her playful and subversive artwork that is often rooted in Japanese culture. Hanayo currently lives and works in Japan.

== Career ==
In 1989 she began to train as a geisha in Tokyo. She later published an account of the experience in her first book, Oshakuchan No. 1. After studying for a short time at the Sorbonne, she formed the band Muscats in 1992 with Japanese noise musicians Masami Akita (Merzbow) and Masaya Nakahara (Violent Onsen Geisha). Later that year Hanayo was featured on the cover of The Face magazine's December issue in full geisha attire. In 1993 she modeled for a Jean Paul Gaultier advertising campaign.

In 1995 Hanayo retired from her geisha work and moved to London, where she married a German man and gave birth to her daughter Tenko. In 1997 she met German director and performance artist Christoph Schlingensief. She moved to Berlin and worked with him on several projects, such as portraying Yoko Ono in the performance Mein Filz, mein Fett, mein Hase (English: My Felt, My Fat, My Hare) at documenta X in Kassel, taking part in Schlingensief's performance Passion Impossible at the Deutsches Schauspielhaus in Hamburg, and playing a role in Die letzten Tage der Rosa Luxemburg (English: The Last Days of Rosa Luxemburg) at the Berliner Ensemble. In 2000 Hanayo starred in Shane O'Sullivan's film Second Generation.

Hanayo's single Joe le taxi has been featured on many compilations, including 2 Many DJs with Soulwax. She has performed with musicians and bands such as Violent Onsen Geisha, Red Crayola, Vapid Dolly, The Black Dog, Jun Miyake, Merzbow, Woodman, Kai Althoff, Terre Thaemlitz, The Panacea, Pain Cake (with Locust Fudge), and Ponpons. She started working with Berlin-based art band Wooden Veil in 2007.

In 2011 she and her daughter moved back to Tokyo.

== Artistic style ==
Hanayo is best known for her experimental music, and is sometimes credited with starting the trend of small Asian women making unexpectedly loud music. Her photography pulls together conflicting elements such as piercings and Japanese tradition, or the concepts of "West" and "East", and shows how they can live in symbiosis, a concept her friends call "Baroque of the forest".

== Discography ==
- Makka Na Shizuku (1995), produced by Jun Miyake
- Dang Dong (1995)
- Sayonalala (1996), (featuring The Black Dog and Hair Stylistics)
- Queen Of Pseudo Psychos (1997) / as a member of Vapid Dolly
- Hanayo in Panacea, with The Panacea (1999), discogs entry
- Gift (2000), featuring guest appearances by Merzbow, Kai Althoff, Terre Thaemlitz, Woodman et al
- Joe le taxi (2002)
- wooden veil, dekorder (2009)
- over the rainbow, PANTY (2014)
- cloudy day, PANTY (2014)
- as may fly, +81 (2015)

== Solo exhibitions ==
- Taka Ishii Gallery, Tokyo (1996)
- Gallery Institute, Berlin (1997)
- Hanayo: Utsushi-Umekuni, Parco Gallery, Tokyo (2000)
- Hanachambre-winter kinder spielplatz, Kunst-Werk, Berlin (2000)
- Galerie Binz & Krämer, Köln (2001)
- Gallery Koyanagi, Tokyo (2002)
- Hanayo, Palais de Tokyo, Paris (2002)
- Habitat Repubulique Store, Paris (2002)
- agnès b.'s LIBRAIRIE GALERIE, Hong Kong (2003)
- agnès b., Ginza, Tokyo (2003)
- APC shop, Berlin (2004)
- suzy wong bar, Moscow (2005)
- miss HECKER, Berlin (2006)
- Gallery Koyanagi, Tokyo (2008)
- On a Genetic Level: Smell Light Laugh Memory Tear, Galerie Birgit Ostermeier, Berlin (2009)
- On a Genetic Level: Smell Light Laugh Memory Tear, vacant, Tokyo (2010)
- The mechanism of physical spiritual phenomena, parabolica-bis, Tokyo (2010)
- COLPOESNE, UTRECHT, Tokyo (2010)
- COLPOESNE, mark and kyoko, Berlin (2010)
- "schweigen über ..." with hanayo, galerie krise, Berlin (2011)
- hanayo's saugeile kumpels hiromi yoshii roppongi, Houyhnhnm Girls, IMPOSSIBLE PROJECT SPACE, Tokyo (2011)
- Koenzine, gallery spare, Tokyo (2011)
- Opening for gallery le lieu with ameba norimizu, Tokyo (2012)
- agnès b. Art Facade Project, Tokyo (2012)
- Doppelgänger N Da Hood, lim art Tokyo (2012)
- MONDI, Galleria Vault, Prato (2012)
- Taka Ishii Gallery, Berlin (2013)
- berlin, Taka Ishii Gallery, Kyoto (2013)
- berlin saugeile kumpels, NADiff, Tokyo (2013)
- berlin saugeile kumpels, Tsutaya Tokyo (2013)
- grauzone, baikado, Osaka (2013)
- grauzone Haiirokuiki, CoSTUME NATIONAL, Tokyo (2014)
- hanayo in November, kata, Tokyo (2014)
- devil song, gallery door, Tokyo (2014)
- As a Mayfly, +81gallery, NYC (2014)
- ХанаеЛОМО, IMA, tokyo (2014)
- hanayome blouse, housekibako, Tokyo (2014)
- for MAN, hopken, Osaka (2014)
- futatsukukuri baby blues, pnteM, chikanoakichi, Osaka (2015)
- DIM, studio35, Tokyo (2015)
- As a Mayfly, morioka shoten, Tokyo (2015)
- music, AL, Tokyo (2015)
- tenko, Gallery Koyanagi, Tokyo (2016)
- hanayo II, takaishii gallery, Tokyo (2017)
- As a Mayfly at philosopher's walk, hohohoza, Kyoto (2018)
- nanjamonja, studio stuff only, Tokyo (2018)
- lvdv books, Osaka (2018)

== Group exhibitions and other activities ==
- "G-GIRLS" Roentgen Kusntraum, Tokyo (1993)
- UNE AFFAIRE DE FEMMES, Parco Theater, Tokyo (1993)
- "The Little Prince" Shuji Terayama ryuzanji jimusho, JanJan, Tokyo (1994)
- Traditional Japanese Dance Kiyomoto KOMORI, National Theater, Tokyo (1994)
- "Cities on the Move," (curated by Hans Ulrich Obrist- traveling show), Louisiana Denmark and Hayward Gallery London, Wiener Secession, PS1 New York, CAPC Museum of Contemporary Art, etc. (1997)
- ROSA LUXEMBURG by Christopf Schlingensief, Berliner Ensemble Brecht Buhne, Berlin (1997)
- Passion Impossible, Wake Up Call For Germany Christopf Schlingensief, Deutsches Schauspielhaus Hamburg (1997)
- My Felt, My Fat, My Hare, 48 Hours Survival for Germany, Dokumenta X, Kassel (1997)
- "Trash", Greene Naftali, New York (1998)
- ont le plaisir de vous convier a l'inauguration de l'exposition, frac, Nantes (1998)
- Expériences de divers, galerie art & essai, Rennes (1999)
- Protagonist in UK film "Seconde Generation", Shane O'Sullivan (1999)
- Taipei Biennale, Taipei (2000)
- Performance:"City of Girls," Japan Pavilion, The 7th International Architecture Exhibition, Venice (2000)
- mutations, TN probe, Tokyo (2001)
- neue kunst in hamburg 2001, kunsthaus, Hamburg (2001)
- Daily Life, Gallery speak for, Tokyo (2002)
- Aquaplaning, hyeres les palmiers, Hyeres (2002)
- home stories, T-sistem nova GmbH berkom, Berlin (2002)
- Hope PIA1000th issue commemorative exhibition, La Foret Museum, Tokyo (2003)
- circum-festival#03 jazz et musiques improvisees with circum grand orchestra, Lilla (2003)
- CICLO AS MENINAS, Auditorio Serralves, Porto (2003)
- I, Yon-San's World, Atlier Dragon, Hiroshima (2003)
- DIALOGUES by Sasha Waltz, Grand theatre, Bordeaux (2003)
- "Take Art Collection", Spiral Garden, Tokyo (2003)
- Roppongi crossing, mori art museum, Tokyo (2004)
- Live, palais de tokyo, Paris (2004)
- freeze art fair, London (2004)
- dedications of flowers for national treasures of Toshodaiji temple, Tokyo national museum, Tokyo (2005)
- white collection – marie claire, spiral garden, Tokyo (2005)
- a project, agnès b., Tokyo (2005)
- art 36 basel, Basel (2005)
- KUNST ODER KÖNIGIN, Das Magazin der arena, Berlin (2005)
- popyyy, neu!, Berlin (2005)
- Loewe 160 years Anniversary Exhibition Take Me With You, Circulo de Bellas Artes de Madrid, Madrid, mori museum, Tokyo (2006)
- Musical PATTY HEARST, Volksbune, Berlin (2006)
- PICTOPLASMA ANIMATION FESTIVAL, berlinerfestspiele, Berlin (2006)
- You Are Here 2, Eel Pie, Berlin (2007)
- Woodenveil, ballhausnaunyn, Berlin (2007)
- making up, artMbassy, Berlin (2007)
- In Neuem Kontext, St. Johannes Evangelist-Kirche, Haus der Kulturen der Welt, Berlin (2007)
- 2nd PICTOPLASMA ANIMATION FESTIVAL, Rodeo, Berlin (2007)
- 5th berlin biennale, kim Secrets of the Berlin Supermuse Neurotitan, Schwarzenberg e.V, Berlin (2008)
- this place is foreign, mad vickys tea gallery, Paris (2008)
- Paris collection, BERNHARD WILLHELM, Paris (2008)
- KINDERZOO, PROGRAM, Berlin (2009)
- auf wiedersehen New York!, exile, New York (2009)
- fake you, apartment, Berlin (2009)
- galerie krise start, galerie krise, Berlin (2009)
- NEUES MUSEUM, basso, Berlin (2009)
- live film jack smith!, hau2, Berlin with tony conrad (2009)
- carnal, schuebbeprojects, Düsseldorf (2009)
- wooden veil unveiling ceremony, Alten Kindl Barauerei, Berlin (2009)
- after the butcher, HÜTTENDONG, Berlin (2009)
- Rooms Without Walls, Hayward Gallery, London (2009)
- no mans land, French embassy, Tokyo (2009)
- "VILLAGE nowherenowsomewherenowhere" la Biennale de Lyon, Le Grand Dôme de l'hôpital Hôtel Dieu, Lyon (2009)
- Les grandes traversées there goes the neighborhood, Bordeaux (2009)
- Spystation NC1074, New Castle (2010)
- Nezumiko Exhibition, Vol. 2, void, Tokyo (2010)
- WE ARE THE ISLANDS, Bethanien, Berlin (2010)
- "MUJI making the paper chair by your hands", atelier muji, Tokyo (2010)
- TOKYO PHOTO -nissan SKYLINE COUPE photo exhibition, tokyo photo, Tokyo (2010)
- Barnes Dance – an opera by Nicholas Bussmann Sophiensaele, Berlin (2010)
- The BeetoBee Net. VERSUS Wooden Veil, Kunsthaus, Hamburg (2010)
- HanaChambre Berlin, Tokyo Frontline, 3331, Tokyo (2011)
- mauvaisgenre _iLIVETOMORROW, Hong Kong (2011)
- Live in your bread, broom social club, Geneva (2011)
- The Genesis, S&yM, Berlin (2011)
- CREW NECK 2, BEAMS, Tokyo (2011)
- what is this?, monte chrisco studio, Paris (2011)
- Les Soirées nomads, Fondation Cartier, Paris (2012)
- Asoko, ASOKO, Tokyo (2012)
- better never than late, The Museum of Modern Art Saitama, Saitama (2012)
- the snap cardigan show, agnès b., Tokyo (2012)
- better never than late, Kodachi Factory site, Tokyo (2013)
- little Nassau, little Nassau, NYC (2014)
- Bring Your Own, betweenbridges, Berlin (2015)
- hana △ Hocyuekkitou, vacant, Tokyo (2015)
- Traditional Japanese Dance Kiyomoto Tamausagi, National Theater, Tokyo (2015)
- Berlinbiennale boat rage No. 10 – slum, Berlin (2016)
- Tokyo, top museum, Tokyo (2016)
- Derek Jarman chroma with Simon Fisher Turner, uplink, Tokyo (2016)
- MONKY MAGIC, gater, Tokyo (2016)
- 往来往来, MUSEUM OF CONTEMPORARY ART TOKYO, (2017)
- DOMMUNE EXTREAM QUIET VILLAGE, Teien Art Museum with matan zamir, Norimizu Ameya, Tokeso (2017)
- Glay Zone of 6, Ryoji Asabuki x Hanayo, Hirofumi Isoya, Nerhol, Futoshi Miyagi, Leo Pellegatta, GALLERY TRAX, Yamanashi (2017)
- i will always be here with kudos, cpk gallery, Tokyo (2018)

== Biography of song and dance ==
- Nichibu (日舞), Hanayagi School「Kiyomoto Komori」National Theater, Tokyo (1995)
- Sayonarara produced by Black Dogs & hair stylistics, MEDIA REMORAS. A band「Vapid Dolly」was formed with Dizzy Q Viper (ex daisy chainsaw)(1996)
- ROSA LUXEMBURG by Christopf Schlingensief, Berliner Ensemble Brecht Buhne, Berlin (1997)
- Album "Queen of Suede Psycho "Vapid Dolly" epic Sony (1997)
- Performance in Documenta X Christopf Schlingensief, Kassel (1998 )
- Hamburg Theatre & Folkbune, Berlin (1998 )
- Live CBGB, Get together with Alec Empire and merzbow, NY (1998 )
- Protagonist in UK film "Seconde Generation" by Shane O'Sullivan, Formed a band「Paincake」(1999)
- Album "Hanayo in Panacea" (with Panacea), Mille Plateaux (1999)
- Taipei Biennale, Taipei opening concert: Hanayo, Naohiro Ukawa, woodman, Hisanori Asano (2000)
- Performance: "City of Girls," Japan Pavilion, The 7th International Architecture Exhibition, Venice (2000)
- mutations – Sonic City, TN probe, Tokyo (2001)
- aquaplaning, hyeres les palmiers, Hyeres, France (2002)
- Circum-festival#03 jazz et musiques improvisees with circum grand orchestra, Lille (2003)
- CICLO AS MENINAS, Auditorio Serralves, Porto, Portugal (2003)
- DIALOGUES by Sasha Waltz, Grand theatre, Bordeaux, France (2003)
- maxi single "joie le taxi" hit chart universal (2003)
- live, palais de Tokyo, Paris (2004)
- a project, agnès b., Tokyo (2005)
- Musical PATTY HEARST, Volksbune, Berlin (2006)
- PICTOPLASMA ANIMATION FESTIVAL, Berliner fest spiele, Berlin (2006)
- agnès b. 30th anniversary festival at L'Olympia, Paris (2006)
- woodenveil ballhausnaunyn, Berlin (2007)
- In Neuem Kontext, Haus der Kulturen der Welt, Berlin (2007)
- 2nd PICTOPLASMA ANIMATION FESTIVAL, Rodeo, Berlin (2007)
- Traditional Japanese dance nagauta maiko, gallery koyanagi, Tokyo (2008)
- Paris collection, BERNHARD WILLHELM, Paris (2008)
- We com from, , , , , , , , , , , , with Daniel Baudin, mad vickys tea gallery, Paris (2008)
- Traditional Japanese dance opening for Nobuyoshi Araki, jablonka gallery Berlin (2008)
- Les grandes Traversées, cacp, Bordeaux (2008)
- ZWIELICHT 3 with Rashad Becker, A trans Pavilion, Berlin (2009)
- KINDERZOO, PROGRAM, Berlin (2009)
- NEUES MUSEUM, basso, Berlin (2009)
- live film jack smith!, hau2, Berlin with Tony Conrad (2009)
- Rooms Without Walls, Hayward Gallery, London (2009)
- les grandes traversées there goes the neighborhood, Bordeaux (2009)
- Album "wooden veil" wooden veil, Dekorder (2009)
- Barnes Dance – an opera by Nicholas Bussmann Sophiensaele, Berlin (2010)
- The BeetoBee Net,. VERSUS Wooden Veil, Kunsthaus, Hamburg (2010)
- hanallicamotayo début support for CocoRosie, vacant, Tokyo (2011)
- hanallicamotayo Hong Kong tour (2011)
- Performance with Norimizu Ameya＆kathy, gallery le lieu, Tokyo (2012)
- Performance with steve lemercier and Tenko, Taka Ishii gallery Kyoto (2013)
- Performance with steve lemercier and Tenko, NADiff, Kyoto (2013)
- Performance with yusuf etiman, Satoshi Yashiro, Hirozumi Takeda, Tokyo Denki University, Tokyo (2013)
- Nihon buyō (日本舞踊)「Nagauta – Kocyou」, Meguro Gajoen, Tokyo (2014)
- Musical with Mark Borthwick, Taka Ishii Gallery, Tokyo (2014)
- Nichibu (日舞), Hanayagi School「Tama Usagi」, National Theater, Tokyo (2015)
- hana△ Boucyuekkitou, vacant, Tokyo (2015)
- Nihon buyō (日本舞踊)「Nagauta – Oharame」, Meguro Gajoen, Tokyo (2016)
- Berlinbiennale boat rage #10 – slum, Berlin (2016)
- Tertiary sex characteristic, MUSEUM OF CONTEMPORARY ART TOKYO (2017)
- DOMMUNE EXTREAM QUIET VILLAGE, Teien Art Museum with matan zamir, Norimizu Ameya, Tokeso (2017)
- As a Mayfly Improvisation with matan zamir, KYODO HOUSE, Tokyo (2017)
- Haiiro Etude, GALLERY TRAX, Yamanashi (2017)
- Haiiro Yakai, old house, Tokyo (2018)
- As a Mayfly at philosopher's walk, Kiyomoto Tamaya, Anraku-ji, Kyoto (2018)

== Books & publications ==
- Chiisa na geisha san: Oshakuchan No.1 (小さな芸者さん!お酌チャンNo.1!), Tokyo: Media Factory, 1991. ISBN 4-88991-259-2
- Hanayome: Hanayo shashinshū (ハナヨメ 花代写真集) / Hanayome. Tokyo: Shinchōsha, 1996. ISBN 4-10-602420-9. Photo book.
- Doriimumumumumu...bukku (ドリームムムムム...ブック 花代写真集) / Dreammmmm Book. Tokyo: Little More, 2000. ISBN 4-89815-034-9. Photo book.
- Hanayo artist book 2004. Tokyo: Kawade Shobō Shinsha, 2004. ISBN 4-309-90540-4. Photo book.
- Magma. Tokyo: Akaka Publishing, 2008. ISBN 4-903545-25-3. Photo book.
- yonaha, bcck books, 2010. Photo-book
- the mechanism of physical spiritual phenomena, studio parabolica, 2010. Photo-book
- COLPOESNE, UTRECHT ISBN 9784904479322.
- koenzine, hanayo, 2011. Photo-zine
- Doppelgänger N Da Hood, lim art, 2012. Photo-book
- Berlin, getsuyo-sha, 2013. ISBN 978-4-901477-68-0. Photo-book
- grauzone, baby panda printing, 2013. Photo-zine
- As a Mayfly, +81, 2014. Photo box
- music, ladmusician, 2015. ISBN 978-4-908062-15-5. Photo-book
- tenko with Hajima Sawatari, case publishing, 2016. Photo poem book
- mahoroboshiya with Ichiko Aoba, victor music, 2016. 8mm film
- 灰色区域 grauzone 3, baby panda printing, 2017. Photo-zine
- nanjamonja, yyy press, 2018. Photo poem book
