= Lake Placid =

Lake Placid may refer to:

- Lake Placid, New York, site of the 1932 and 1980 Winter Olympics
  - Lake Placid (New York), a lake near the New York village
- Lake Placid, Florida, a town in Highlands County, Florida
- Lake Placid, a lake in Collier County, Florida
- Lake Placid (Highlands County, Florida), a lake on the south edge of the town of Lake Placid, Florida
- Lake Placid, a lake in Pinellas County, Florida
- Lake Placid, Queensland, a suburb of Cairns, in far northern Queensland, Australia
- Lake Placid (Texas), a lake in Texas
- Lake Placid (film), a 1999 film directed by Steve Miner
  - Lake Placid (film series)
- Lake Placid (Taiwan), a lake in East District, Hsinchu, Taiwan
- Lake Placid (Ontario), a lake in Ontario
