= Esplendor Geometrico =

Spanish industrial band

Esplendor Geométrico
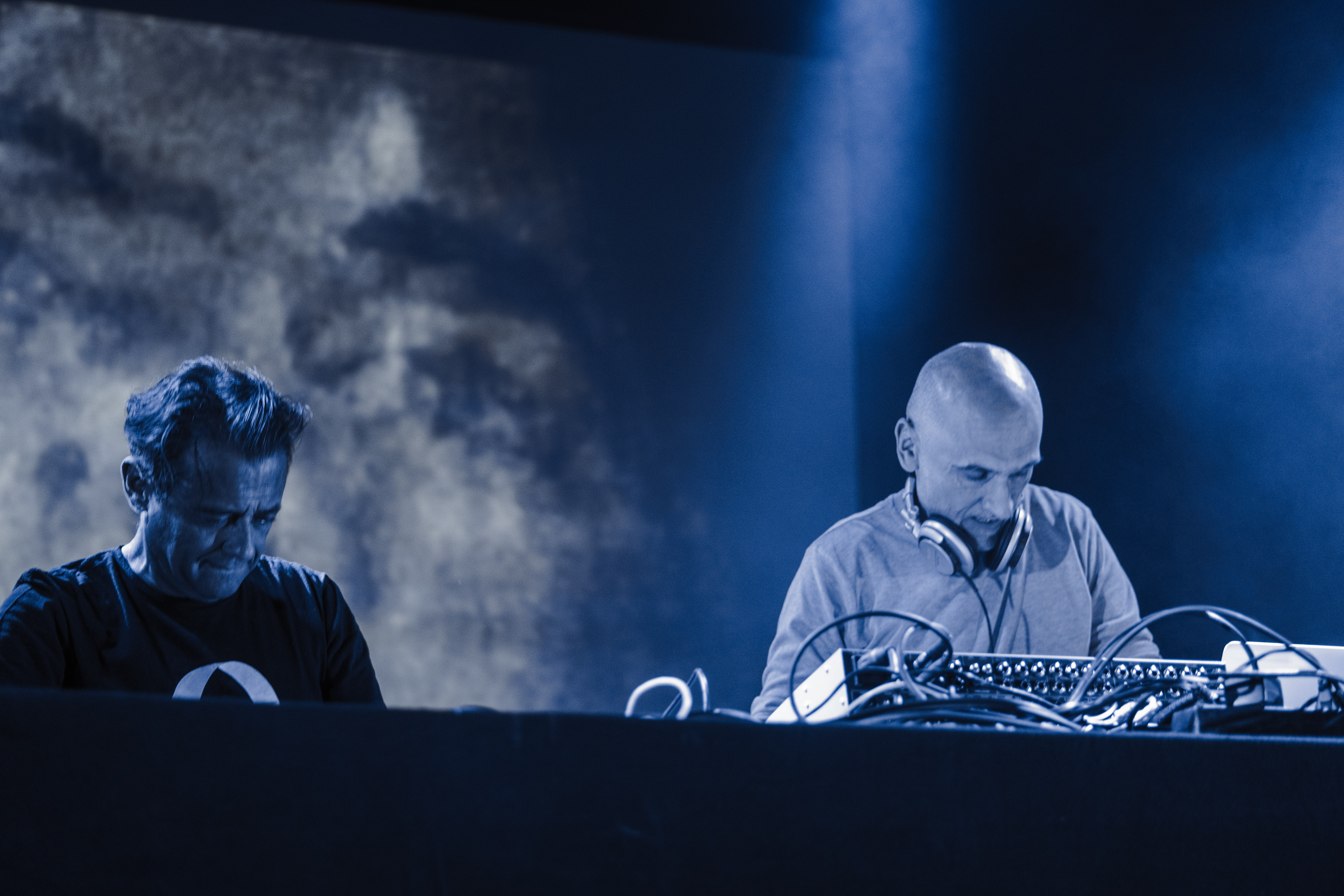
- May, 2016

Background information
- Origin: Madrid, Spain
- Genres: Industrial; noise
- Years active: 1980–present
- Labels: Tic Tac; EGK; Daft; Linea Alternativa; Geometrik
- Spinoffs: Most Significant Beat
- Members: Arturo Lanz; Saverio Evangelista
- Past members: Gabriel Riaza; Juan-Carlos Sastre
- Website: www.rotordiscos.com/autores/esplendor-geometrico/1721/

Esplendor Geométrico is a Spanish industrial band. The band was formed in the early 1980s by Arturo Lanz, Gabriel Riaza, and Juan Carlos Sastre, who had all been members of El Aviador Dro y sus Obreros Especializados. They took the name "Geometric Splendor" from Geometric and Mechanical Splendor and the Numerical Sensibility (Italian: Lo splendore geometrico e meccanico e la sensibilità numerica), a text of the Italian futurist, F.T. Marinetti.

== History ==
Circa 1977, Arturo Lanz and Servando Carballar experimented with sound under the name Holoplástico. By 1978 they placed a newspaper ad to recruit a band, gaining the attention of Andrés Noarbe, Gabriel Riaza, and Juan Carlos Sastre. They formed El Aviador Dro which played techno-pop music "in the style of Devo." Lanz, Riaza, and Sastre lost interest in the direction of El Aviador Dro and departed the band in 1980 in order to strike out in a different musical direction. Their early work was influenced by Kraftwerk, as well as DAF, Neu!, and Can.

The band was active in the early-eighties international tape scene where they established a rhythmic, experimental electronic sound that foreshadowed the emergence of the powernoise subgenre by over a decade. In 1981, the band released their first single, "Necrosis en la Poya", on the Tic Tac label. This was followed in 1982 by the EG-1 cassette (also referred to as Muerte A Escala Industrial) which had a run of 300 copies and their first LP, Héroe del Trabajo / El Acero del Partido, which was released in two pressings of 500 copies. Their first works included vocal experimentations but the band abandoned these by the time of Héroe del Trabajo / El Acero del Partido. Sastre departed the band in 1982.

Esplendor Geométrico released 1980–1982, a double album compiled, digitized and mastered for CD in Netherlands, containing the first single (1980), cassette (1981) and LP (1982). The song title "El Acero del Partido" (The Steel of Party) was inspired on the metallurgical complex in Elbasan (Albania), while "Héroe del Trabajo" (Hero of Labor) was inspired by the Albanian honorific title for civilians workers. CD 1 was previously released as the "Eg1" cassette (later CD with bonus tracks). CD 2 was previously released as the CD "El Acero del Partido" (including the LP "El Acero del Partido" and the single "Necrosis en la poya").

In 1985, the band formed their own label, Esplendor Geométrico Discos, and released their second LP, Comisario de la Luz / Blanco de Fuerza, with an initial run of 500 copies. The LP included an excerpt of the band's November 1984 performance in Madrid.

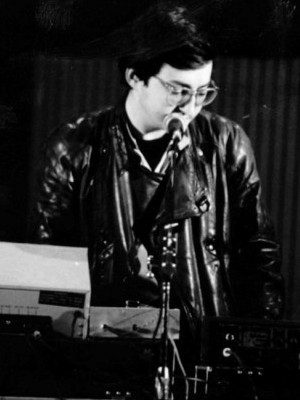
Live in Rome 1986.

In 1990, the band released a double cassette box titled Diez años de esplendor (English: Ten years of splendor) to commemorate the tenth anniversary of the band. It was recorded and mastered in Belgium. In 1997, it was reissue as a double-CD set titled Tarikat. The reissue label "Vinyl-On-Demand" also released the 3LP box 1980-1989; First decade in 2007, including a third LP with live studio and bonus tracks. In addition, there is also a red 'Friends Edition' box set with golden imprints.

In 1993, they released Arispejal astisaró, an album recorded at Chon Studio Palma (Majorca), mixed at Al-Majriti Studio in Melilla, and digitalized and mastered for CD in Bochum (Germany).

In 1994, the band played at the first Sónar festival in Barcelona, alongside acts such as The Orb.

The band returned with 1997's Polyglophone, the following year, artists such as Coil and Chris and Cosey contributed reworkings of Esplendor Geométrico tracks to the remix album EN-CO-D-Esplendor. In 2002, Compuesto de Hierro was released, while a double CD compilation, Anthology 1981–2003, hit the shops in 2005.

== Discography ==
- Necrosis en la poya 7" (1981, reissued in 2020)
- EG-1 cassette (1981, reissued on CD in 2000)
- El acero del partido/Héroe del trabajo LP (1982, reissued on CD in 2000)
- Comisario de la luz/Blanco de fuerza LP (1985)
- 1980-1981 cassette (1986)
- En Roma cassette (1986)
- En directo: Madrid y Tolosa cassette (1987)
- Kosmos kino LP (1987, reissued on CD in 1996)
- Mekano-turbo LP (1988, reissued on CD in 1994)
- Madrid mayo '89 cassette (1989)
- Live in Utrecht LP (1990, reissued on CD in 1999)
- Diez años de esplendor 2 x cassette (1990)
- Sheikh Aljama (jeque de aljama) CD (1991)
- 1980-1982 2 x cassette (1993)
- Arispejal astisaró (powerful metal) CD (1993)
- Veritatis splendor CD (1994)
- 1983-1987 CD (1994)
- Nador CD (1995)
- Tokyo sin fin CD (1996)
- Treinta kilómetros de radio CD-EP (1996)
- Balearic rhythms CD (1996)
- 80s tracks CD (1996)
- Tarikat 2 x CD (1997)
- Polyglophone CD (1997)
- Syncrotrón mini-LP (1998)
- EN-CO-D-Esplendor (remixes) CD (1998)
- Compuesto de hierro CD (2002)
- Moscú está helado (remixes) CD (2004)
- Anthology 1981-2003 2 x CD (2005)
- 8 traks & live CD / DVD (2007)
- Pulsión CD (2009)
- Desarrollos geométricos CD (2011)
- Ultraphoon CD (2013)
- Fluida Mekaniko CD (2016)
- 40 Años Nos Iluminan 2 x CD (2020)
- Cinética CD (2020)
- Strepitus Rhythmicus CD (2024)
