= Tarmvred =

Swedish electronic music project

- Origin: Gothenburg, Sweden
- Genres: Rhythmic noise, breakcore
- Labels: Ad Noiseam; Low Res Records
- Members: Jonas Johansson
- Website: http://www.tarmvred.net/

Tarmvred (Swedish for ileus) is an electronic musical project from Gothenburg, Sweden that is the brainchild of Jonas Johansson.

== History ==
Johansson got his start musically by making his own remixes of tracks by Skinny Puppy and posting them online under the name Triptamine, in 1998. In 2001, Johansson finished recording an album called Ileus that he self-released as a CDR under the name Tarmvred, with remixing by Johannes Hedberg (credited as Digidroid). Around the same time, Johansson came into contact with Nicolas Chevreux who invited him to sign with a new label Chevreux was starting called Ad Noiseam. Hedberg continued working with Johansson until Hedberg was listed as a member of Tarmvred in 2003 on Viva 6581. Tarmvred has recorded primarily on the German Ad Noiseam label, although the latest release, the vinyl-only e.p. Tintorama, is on Low Res Records, based in Detroit, Michigan.

== Style of music ==
Tarmvred's music has an experimental, electronic style, with heavy beats, a barrage of irregular percussion, distortion, and sparse use of melody. Only one brief stanza of clearly sung lyrics appear in all of their work, by guest vocalist Gertrud Polonyi; it appears on track 5 of Subfusc, as well as on the track "Mourning" on Onomatopoeic (apparently the same recording of the lyrics). Heavily distorted lyrics appear on a few other tracks, never more than briefly. Their tracks sometimes wander between rhythmic and chaotic, and have a wide variety of motives that continue falling away or appearing throughout the track. Tarmvred recorded much of Viva 6581 using a MOS 6581 sound chip, featured in early-80's computers such as the Commodore 64.

== Discography ==
- Ileus (self-released, 2001)
- Onomatopoeic (Ad Noiseam, 2001)
- Subfusc (Ad Noiseam, 2001)
- Viva 6581 (Ad Noiseam, 2003)
- Tintorama EP (Low Res, 2005)

== Compilation appearances ==
- Panacea Shares Needles With Tarmvred (compilation with Panacea and Needle Sharing remixing each other's work - Ad Noiseam, 2002)
- Tarmvred and Iszoloscope Do America (compilation with Iszoloscope - Ad Noiseam, 2003)
- Proven In Action (compilation from First Aid Recordings, 2003)
- Zombie Commandos From Hell: Sonic Assault (compilation from Optikon Records and Geska Records)
- Wilt / Tarmvred T.B.A. (announced by Ad Noiseam, not yet released)
- Krach Test (compilation from Ad Noiseam, 2001)
- Hybrid Components (Component Records)
- Subsnow 02-02
- ElectriXmas 2003 (2003)
- Colliding Frequencies 2
- Maschinenfest 2002 Festival Edition
- Dark Pathways - Volume 1 (Crunchpod Media)
- Don't Touch My Car!! (Mile 329 Org)
- This Is What We Do!!! (Mile 329 Org)

== Remix appearances ==
- Curtis Chip - Eating Paste
- Cdatakill - Paradise
- Antigen Shift - Implicit Structures
