= Orphx =

Canadian music duo

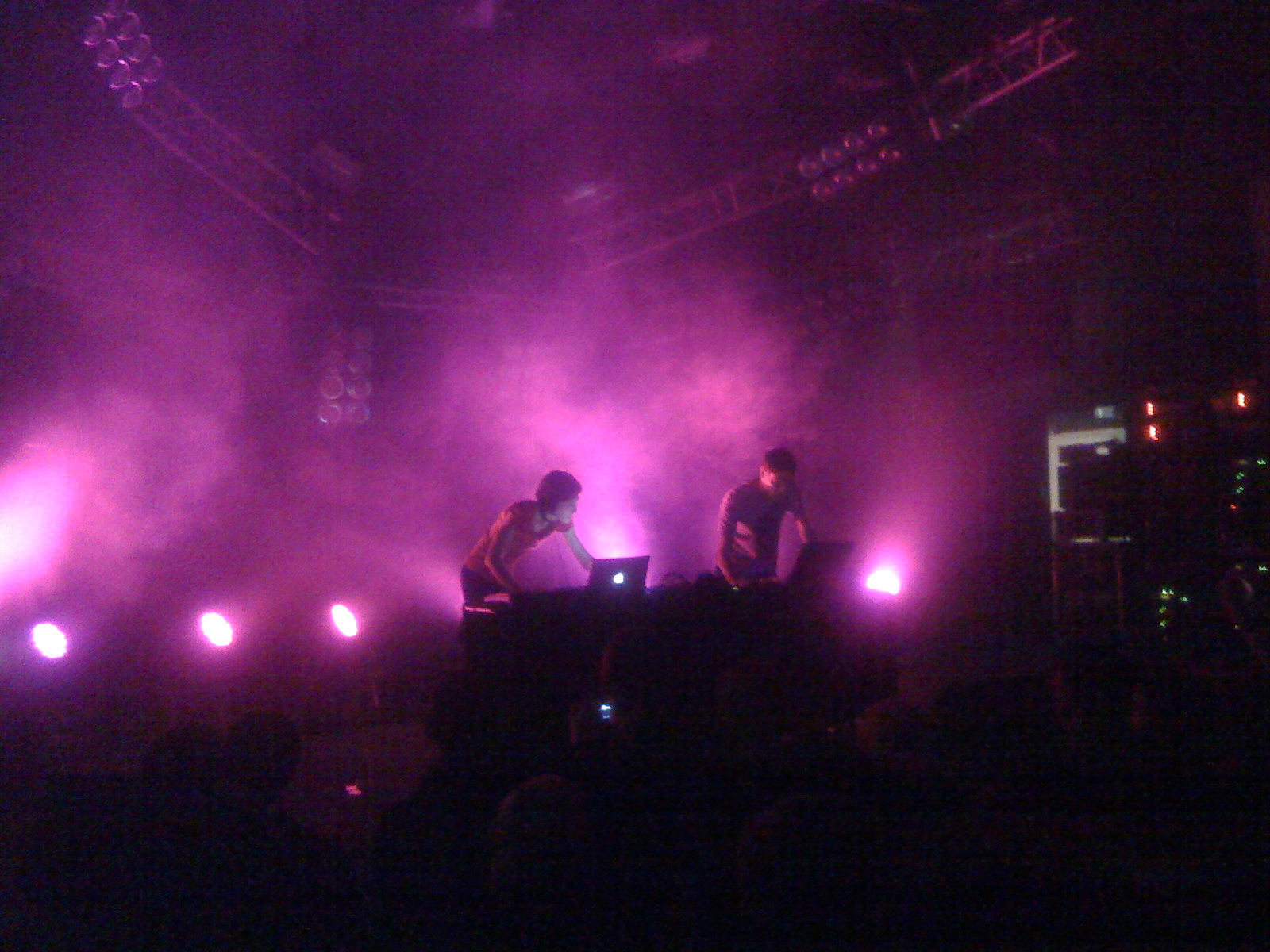
- Orphx performing live in 2008.

Background information
- Origin: Canada
- Genres: Industrial techno, rhythmic noise, minimal techno, dub techno
- Years active: 1994 - present
- Labels: Sonic Groove, Hands Productions, Hymen Records, Hospital Productions, Malignant Records
- Website: http://www.orphx.com

Orphx is a Canadian music duo made up of Rich Oddie and Christina Sealey who perform techno, industrial and experimental music. They have performed worldwide and have numerous releases on CD, vinyl and cassette through independent music labels such as Sonic Groove, Hands Productions, Hymen Records, and Hospital Productions.

== History ==
Orphx was created in late 1993 in the Canadian city of Hamilton, Ontario by Rich Oddie, Christina Sealey and Aron West. Their early output was a development of early industrial music and power electronics but they soon began introducing elements of techno, electro and dub. Oddie and West created the Xcreteria cassette label to release and distribute recordings from Orphx and related projects. West left in 1995 to focus on the noise project Tropism. By 1997, Oddie and Sealey were working closely with Germany's Hands label and performing regularly in Europe as part of the "rhythmic noise" scene. Most studio recordings between 1997 and 2008 are credited to Oddie, while more recent recordings are often attributed to both Oddie and Sealey.

Since 2009, Orphx has been working primarily with the Sonic Groove label and has become more prominent within the worldwide techno scene. They have appeared at international festivals and celebrated venues around the world, including Berghain, Berlin Atonal, Katharsis, Khidi, Labyrinth, Movement, Mutek, Rural Festival, Unsound, and Tresor. In 2008, Sealey began experimenting with modular synthesizers, which quickly became a key feature of their live performances and recordings. Orphx was featured in I Dream of Wires, a 2014 documentary on the resurgence of modular synthesizers, and Industrial Soundtrack For The Urban Decay, a 2015 documentary on the history of industrial music.

Orphx have released sixteen albums and numerous singles on cassette, CD, and vinyl, as well as video releases. In recent years, they have created many remixes for other artists including Conrad Schnitzler, Front Line Assembly, Oscar Mulero, Nomeansno, Perc, and Svreca. Existing side projects include Eschaton (Orphx + Ancient Methods), O/H (Rich Oddie + Dave Foster), Oureboros (Rich Oddie + Aron West), and collaborative live performances and releases with JK Flesh (Justin Broadrick).

Orphx releases are often based around social, political or psychological / spiritual themes. Circuitbreaking (Hymen, 2004) was a political commentary on economic globalization, Insurgent Flows (Hands, 2005) was a response to US imperialism in Iraq, and Pitch Black Mirror (Sonic Groove / Hands, 2016) explored themes of depression and redemption. The Pitch Black Mirror album and other recent releases combine industrial techno rhythms with post-punk influences and a more prominent use of vocals

== Releases ==
- 01 C60 (1993, Xcreteria)
- 02 C60 (1994, Xcreteria)
- Bhavana C60 (1995, first Antiform release, Xcreteria)
- Obsession and Progress C60 (1996, BloodLust)
- Fragmentation CD (1996, Malignant Records)
- The Final Moments C60 (1997, Isolation / Third Force) - split release with En Nihil
- Nullity 10" (1998 Hands)
- Vita Mediativa CD (1998, Hands)
- Surface 12" (2000, Hands)
- The Living Tissue CD/2xLP (2001, Hands)
- Other Voices 12" (2002, Hands)
- Chalice 10" (2002, Auf Abwegen)
- S/O/S CD (2003, Hushush) - collaboration with Dead Voices on Air
- Interference CD (2003, Hands) - collaboration with The Infant Cycle
- Circuitbreaking CD+12" (2004, Hymen)
- Insurgent Flows CD (2005, Hands)
- Teletai 2xCD (2008, Hands)
- Division 12" (2009, Sonic Groove)
- Black Light 12" (2010, Sonic Groove)
- Traces 12" (2011, Sonic Groove)
- Radiotherapy CD (2011, Hands)
- Hunger Knows No Law 12" (2012, Sonic Groove)
- Boundary Conditions 12" (2013, Sonic Groove)
- Eschaton 12" (2014, Token) - collaboration with Ancient Methods
- Sacrifice 12" (2014, Sonic Groove)
- The Sonic Groove Releases Pt.1 CD (2014, Hymen)
- The Sonic Groove Releases Pt.2 CD (2015, Hymen)
- Eschaton II 12" (2016, Token) - collaboration with Ancient Methods
- Pitch Black Mirror 2xLP/CD (2016, Sonic Groove / Hands)
- 1993/1994 Archive 2xLP (2017, Mannequin)
- 01/02 2xCD (2017, Hospital Productions)
- Learn To Suffer 12" (2018, Sonic Groove)
- Light Bringer 2xLP (2019, Hospital Productions) - collaboration with JK Flesh
