= Distel =

Distel (German for "thistle") is a surname. Notable people with the surname include:

- Anne Distel (born 1947), French curator and art critic
- George Distel, American politician
- Dutch Distel (1896–1967), American baseball player
- Herbert Distel (born 1942), Swiss painter, sculptor, photographer, filmmaker and composer
- Marthe Distel, French journalist
- Sacha Distel (1933–2004), French singer and guitarist
- Galit Distel-Atbaryan, Israeli writer and politician

== See also ==
- Distel Zola (born 1989), French-Congolese football player
