= Placid =

Placid is a masculine given name, and may refer to:

- John Placid Adelham (17th century), English Protestant minister
- Saint Placid (6th century), Italian Christian monk
- Placid J. Podipara (20th century), Indian Catholic priest

== See also ==
- Placide
- Placid, Texas, a community in the United States
- Lake Placid (disambiguation)
