= Placido =

Placido may refer to:

== People ==
=== Surname ===
- José Plácido de Castro (1873–1908), Brazilian soldier and politician
- Michele Placido, (born 1946) Italian actor and director
- Plácido Vega y Daza, (1830-1878) 19th century Mexican general and politician
- Mike De Placido, (born 1954) English footballer
- Violante Placido, actress, singer, and daughter of Michele Placido

=== Given name ===
- Placido (Tonkawa leader) (c.1790—1862) chieftain of the Tonkawa Indians of Texas
- Placido Columbani, 18th-century Italian architectural designer, who worked chiefly in England
- Placido Costanzi, (1702-1759) Italian painter
- Plácido Domingo, (born 1941) Spanish operatic tenor
- Placido Falconio, aka "Falconi", 16th-century Italian composer
- Plácido Polanco, (born 1975) Dominican Major League Baseball player
- Placido Puccinelli, (1609-1685) 17th-century Cassinese monk, historian and scholar
- Placido Rizzotto (1914–1948), Italian partisan, socialist peasant and trade union leader
- Plácido Rodriguez, (born 1940) Mexican-born priest and current bishop of Lubbock, Texas
- Placido Zurla, (1769-1834) 19th-century Italian writer and Cardinal Vicar of Rome
- Placido Flamingo, an opera-singing flamingo on Sesame Street named after Plácido Domingo, mainly appearing in the 1980s
- Gabriel de la Concepción Valdés (1809–1844), also known as Plácido, Cuban poet and revolutionary

== Places ==
- Plácido de Castro, Acre, Brazil
- Plácido Aderaldo Castelo, a stadium in Fortaleza, Ceará, Brazil

== Films ==
- Plácido (film), a 1961 Spanish film directed by Luis García Berlanga
