= Cross Club =

Music venue in Prague, Czech Republic

- Cross Club

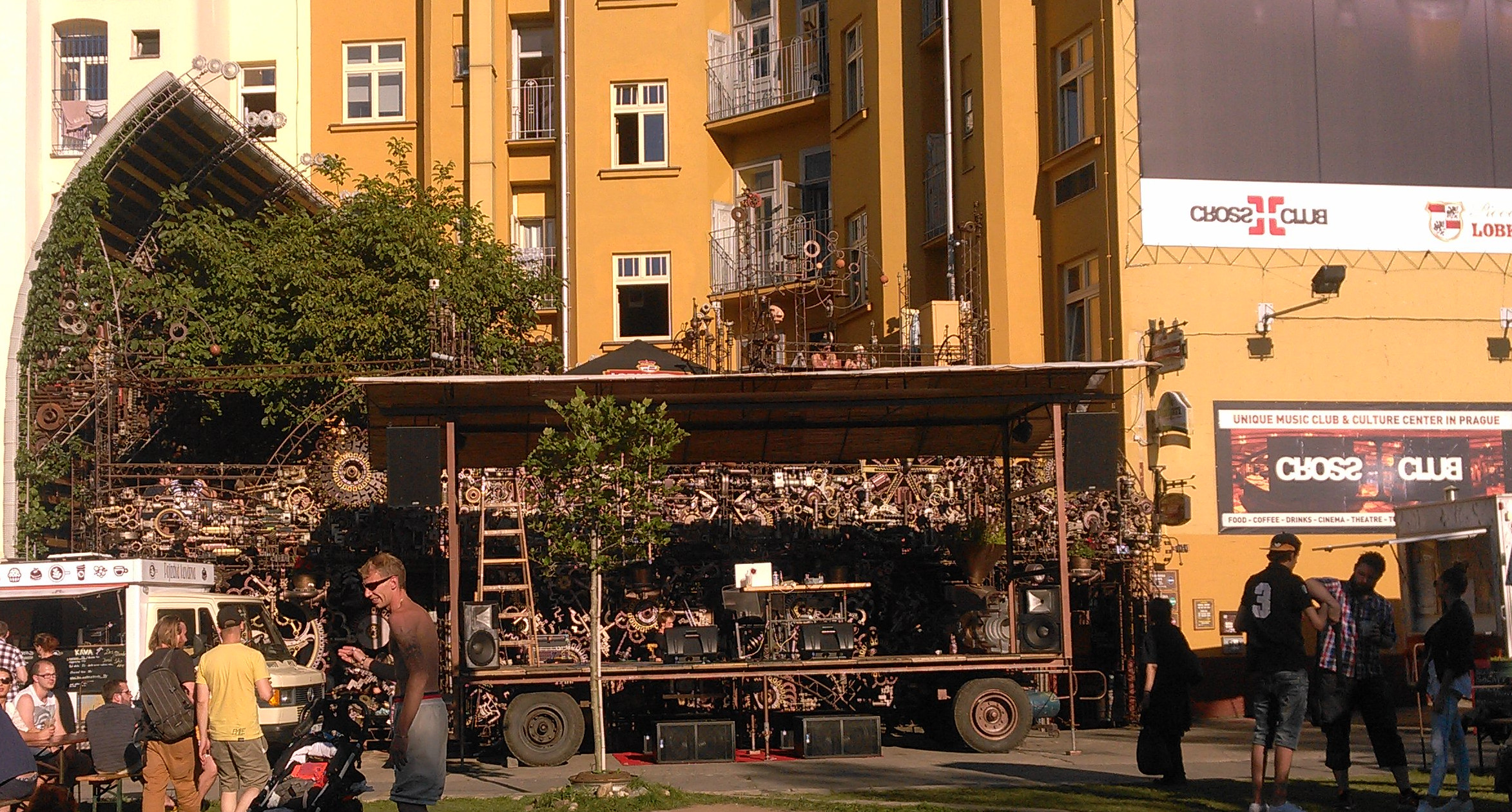
- Cross Club entrance
- Interactive map of Cross Club
- Address: Plynární 1096; Prague 7 Czech Republic
- Coordinates: 50°6′29.55″N 14°26′35.6″E

Construction
- Opened: 2002

Website
- Official website

Cross Club is a music venue located in the Holešovice district of Prague, Czech Republic.

== History ==
Cross Club was founded by a group of friends in 2002. Originally a small club, which has expanded over the years into a three-floor venue. Cross Club showcases various music performances, cultural events and exhibitions. There's a daytime cafe and a restaurant on the premises.

== Cross Club area ==
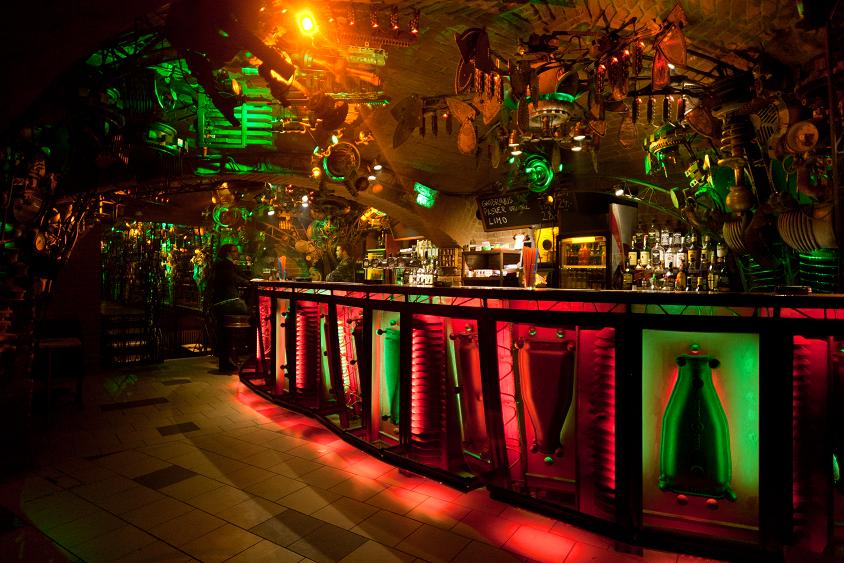
A bar inside Cross Club

Both interior and exterior are designed in steam-punk futuristic style and since the beginning have been created mainly from trash metal and other waste material by Cross Club team DIY. The whole space undergoes changes over time, and currently contains two indoor stages, multiple bars, cafe and restaurant, theater, rehearsal studios and an outdoor sitting area and stage.

== Line-up ==
Cross Club has hosted different acts from various music and culture fields, focusing mainly on unconventional scene and cultural diversity, favouring genres such as dub, dubstep, breakbeat, drum'n'bass, reggae, ska, punk rock, rockabilly, world music and experimental music.

Performers such as Camo & Krooked, EZ3kiel, Zion Train, Congo Natty, Dreadzone Soundsystem, Jah Shaka, Che Sudaka, Transglobal Underground, High Tone, Bambounou, Ragga Twins, The Stooges, Nanci and Phoebe, Joe Driscoll & Sekou Kouyate, Zenzile, Dom & Roland, Vibronics, Creepshow, Koffin Kats, The Bush Chemists, Rashad & Dj Spinn and many more have appeared at Cross Club in recent years.

Presentations, discussions, screenings and authors' readings also regularly take place at the venue, focusing mainly on social topics.

== See also ==
In 2014, Cross Club was listed as one of 25 best venues in Europe according to an article published by the Guardian newspaper.
