= Lake Placid (Highlands County, Florida) =

Lake in the state of Florida, United States

- Location within Florida Location within the United States
- Location: south of city of Lake Placid, Florida; city limits border north shore of lake
- Coordinates: 27°14′35″N 81°21′56″W
- Lake type: natural freshwater lake
- Basin countries: United States
- Max. length: 2.93 miles (4.72 km)
- Max. width: 1.71 miles (2.75 km)
- Surface area: 3,406.03 acres (1,378 ha)
- Average depth: 9 ft (2.7 m)
- Max. depth: 57 feet (17 m)
- Surface elevation: 92 feet (28 m)

Lake Placid, a gourd-shaped lake, has a surface area of 3,406.03 acres (13,783,700 m^{2}). This lake is south of the city of Lake Placid, Florida; it is just outside the south city limits of the city. This lake was once known as Lake Childs. The area immediately surrounding it is mostly rural, but there are housing developments abutting the lake on part of its west side. Placid View Drive runs along part of the west side and Old State Route 8 runs along part of the east side.

Lake Placid provides public access along part of its shore. There are two public boat ramps on shore, one at 150 Harris Drive (on the northeast side) and the other at 3349 Placid View Drive (on the west side of the lake). There are no public swimming areas along the lake shore, but it can be fished from the shore. This lake has a variety of game fish: largemouth bass, catfish, bream, bluegill, redear sunfish, blue catfish, crappie.

This lake named Lake Placid is one of several Lake Placids in Florida, as well as other places.
