= Patrick van Kerckhoven =

Dutch DJ and producer

Patrick van Kerckhoven (born 1970, alias DJ Ruffneck) is a darkcore or gabber DJ and producer, originating from Alblasserdam, Netherlands. An active DJ since 1985, Kerckhoven has also been involved with various record labels. In 1989, he and Jayant Edoo formed 80 Aum Records. When that closed in 1991, he went on to form Ruffneck Records and its imprints Ruffex and Ruff Intelligenze.

After a disagreement with parent label XSV Music, Kerckhoven formed Gangsta Audiovisuals and its imprint Supreme Intelligence, then in 2001, Kerckhoven also closed these and moved all artists to Enzyme Records. Enzyme has three imprints: Enzyme K7, Enzyme VIP and Enzyme X. JUGGERNAUT, another pseudonym of van Kerckhoven during his Ruffneck years, has released a single, "Ruffneck rules da artcore scene!!!", borrowing the melody of In the Hall of the Mountain King, which reached eight in the Dutch top 40 in 1997 ("Dutch Top 40 archive".).

His latest imprint is called Tainted Audio and was formed to fulfill his desire to keep on experimenting with drum and bass influenced underground hardcore music.
