= Sanctum (band) =

Swedish musical group

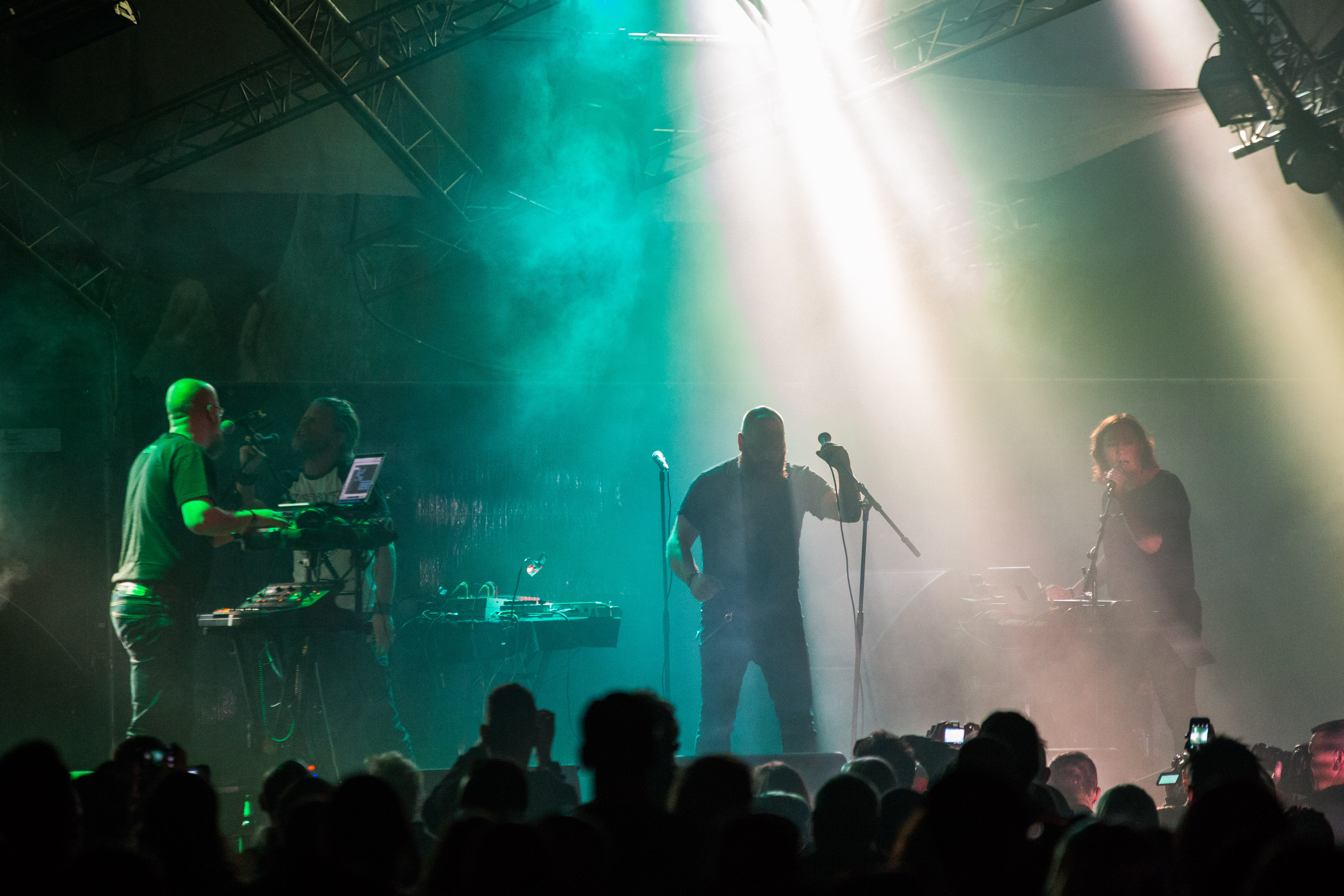
Sanctum (October 10, 2015)

Sanctum is a Swedish electronic band, formed by Jan Carleklev. Their music is often classified as industrial or electronic, and combines elements of orchestral and contemporary music. Lately experimental music has become a dominant influence. Sanctum originally consisted of four members, Jan Carleklev, Marika Kante, Håkan Paulsson and Lena Robért. The singer Lena Robért and the cellist Marika Kante left the band in 2001. Nowadays Jan Carleklev and Håkan Paulsson continue with the help of guest vocalists.

Sanctum has played shows in Europé and the US, for example at Maschinenfest, Cornerstone Festival and Wave-Gotik-Treffen. During Sanctum shows a video live-mix is provided by the video artist Ulrika Carlsson.

Paulsson and Carleklev also spend their time in Counterblast.

== Discography ==
=== Albums ===
- Lupus in Fabula (CMI) — released 1996
- New York City Bluster (CMI) — released 2000
- Let's Eat (CMI) — released 2004
