= Ivan Shopov =

Bulgarian musician

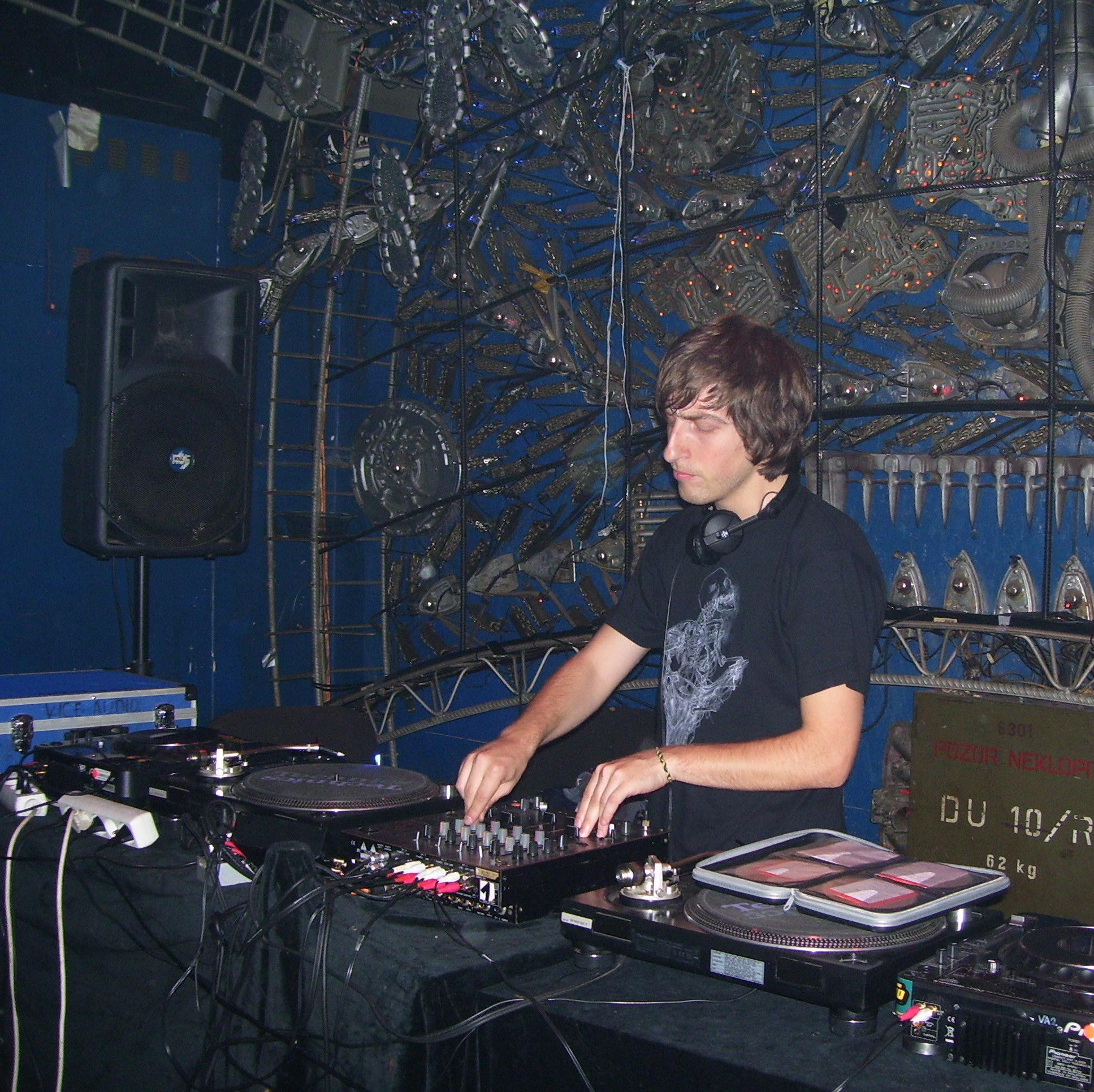
Cooh playing at the Cross Club in Prague.

Ivan Shopov (Bulgarian: Иван Шопов, born 7 September 1982), better known by his stage names Cooh (COOH, CooH) and Balkansky (Бalkansky), is a Bulgarian music producer, DJ, print maker and fine art creator. He produces drum and bass, dubstep IDM, ambient and jazz music.

Shopov was born in Troyan, a town in central northern Bulgaria. At 16, he played in a punk-metal band in Troyan. He got involved in electronic music at age 18. In 2002, Shopov began a promotion of drum and bass throughout Bulgaria together with Valeri Sholevski (Ogonek). Shopov is a graduate of the National Academy of Art in Sofia.

As Cooh, Shopov has released tracks for several prominent international drum and bass labels and has performed in events all across Europe and America including many Therapy Sessions events as a headliner. Under the stage name Balkansky, Shopov released the 2009 album Kuker, a collaboration with the kaval player Theodosii Spassov. The album combines Bulgarian folklore music with dubstep and other electronic music genres.
