= Power noise =

Genre of industrial music

- Other names: Rhythmic noise; rhythm 'n' noise; distorted beat music
- Stylistic origins: Post-industrial; noise; Japanoise; electro-industrial; hardcore techno; gabber
- Cultural origins: Mid-1990s; Germany, Belgium and United Kingdom
- Derivative forms: Technoid; industrial hardcore; industrial techno; terrorcore; noisecore

Regional scenes
- Europe; United States; Australia

Other topics
- Power electronics

Power noise (also known as rhythmic noise, rhythm 'n' noise and distorted beat music) is a subgenre of noise and post-industrial music, that originated predominantly in Europe during the 1990s. It draws primary influence from various styles of electronic dance music.

== History ==
=== 1990s ===
Power noise takes inspiration from Spanish industrial act Esplendor Geométrico, active since 1980, and other artists such as Le Syndicat, active since 1982. The Belgian group Dive also anticipated the style in the early '90s along with a number of releases on the harder or harsher end of the techno spectrum such as several early vinyl EP releases by Aphex Twin. The term "power noise" was coined by Raoul Roucka of Noisex in 1997, with the track "United (Power Noise Movement)". The genre was exposed to the U.S. industrial scene by the electro-industrial act Wumpscut, who signed Noisex to the label Mental Ulcer Forges.

The first power noise artists were mostly German. In addition to Noisex, these included Asche, Morgenstern, P·A·L, Synapscape, and Feindflug. The Belgians Axiome, Hypnoskull, Imminent, Ah Cama-Sotz, Sonar, and This Morn' Omina, also developed the genre. Black Lung, an Australian, and Orphx, Canadians, were also active in the style at this time. Japanoise musicians, such as Merzbow, Aube, and Contagious Orgasm, have also made use of prominent rhythms.

=== 2000s–2010s ===
Notable power noise artists who emerged in the 21st century include Iszoloscope, Antigen Shift, Maria and the Mirrors, Prospero, Drillbit, Tarmvred, Converter, Terrorfakt, Alter Der Ruine, Panzer Division, C/A/T, Dreamcrusher, Death Spells, and Xotox.

== Characteristics ==
Typically, power noise is instrumental, based upon a distorted kick drum from a drum machine such as a Roland TR-909, and often uses militaristic 4/4 beats. Sometimes a melodic component is added, but this is usually secondary to the rhythm. Power noise tracks are typically structured and danceable, but are occasionally abstract. This genre was showcased at the annual Maschinenfest festival in Oberhausen, Germany, as well as Kinetik Festival in Montreal, Canada.

Some groups, such as Combichrist and Dulce Liquido, practice power noise along with aggrotech. Others, such as Tarmvred, meld the style with breakcore. Others still, merge elements of IDM, such as Endif.

There has often been very similar sounds coming from the techno scene which at times has been embraced by those into rhythmic noise such as the late 1990s/2000 era Speedy J, or releases on labels like Uncivilized World.

In the current decade, there has been a resurgence of the harder, harsher and more experimental sounds in techno which crosses over a lot with the sounds of rhythmic noise although this is usually just known as industrial techno, instead of rhythmic noise or power noise, because these two scenes are often unaware of each other. For example, the artist Ancient Methods (one of the artists responsible for the resurgence of industrial techno), sampled P·A·L's track Gelöbnis on one of his first releases and has also later released music on Hands Productions which is one of the first labels that started pushing the rhythmic noise style back in the 90s.

There has also been and continues to be crossover within other sounds and scenes such as the breakcore and IDM scenes.
