= Morgenstern (band) =

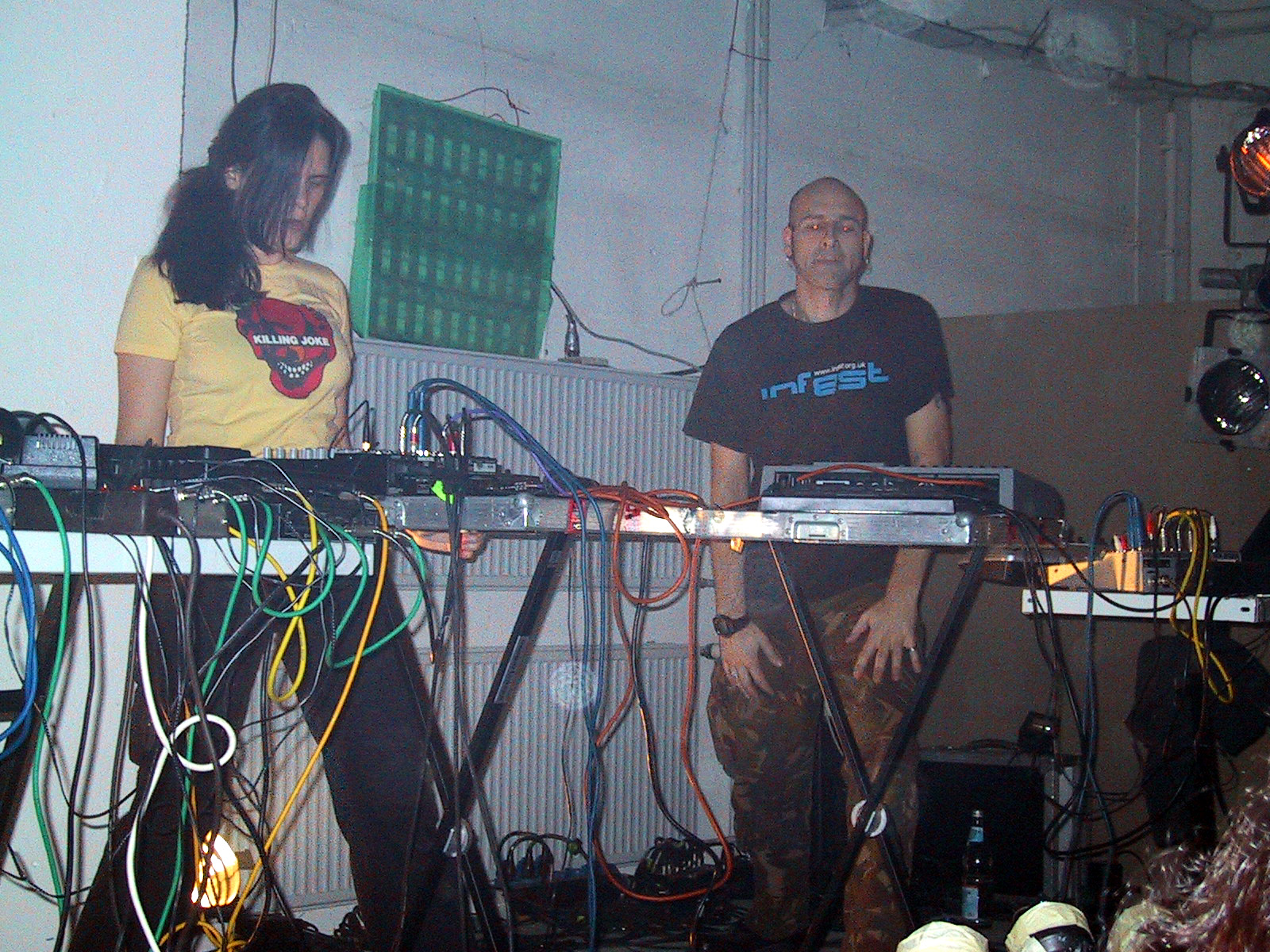
- Morgenstern on stage at the IWTBF Festival, Berlin, December 2003

Background information
- Origin: Switzerland
- Genres: Noise; industrial; ambient
- Years active: 1993–present
- Labels: Ant-Zen
- Members: Andrea Börner

Morgenstern is a musical project combining noise, industrial, and ambient music. It is a continuing act of Germany's Ant-Zen record label.

== History ==
Morgenstern was founded in 1993 by Andrea Börner. The word "Morgenstern" means "Morning star." Börner was a founding member of the industrial/punk crossover band Ars Moriendi. She now devotes most of her time to Morgenstern, but also participates in the projects Templegarden's, KYAM, and Monokrom.

== Discography ==
- (untitled) (Split w/ Mandelbrot), 1994
- (untitled) (Split w/ Asche), 1996
- That Loop in My Eye (Split w/ Asche), 1997
- (s/t), CD, 1998
- Zyklen, CD, 1999
- Cold, CD, 2001
- Erode (with Converter and Asche), CD, 2001
- Live at IWTBF Berlin 03 (Split w/ Monokrom), CD-R, 2004
- Hypnoider Zustand, CD-R, 2005
- Yesterdays, CD-R, 2005
- Two Different Faces, CD, 2005

== See also ==
- List of ambient music artists
