= Chris & Cosey =

British musical duo

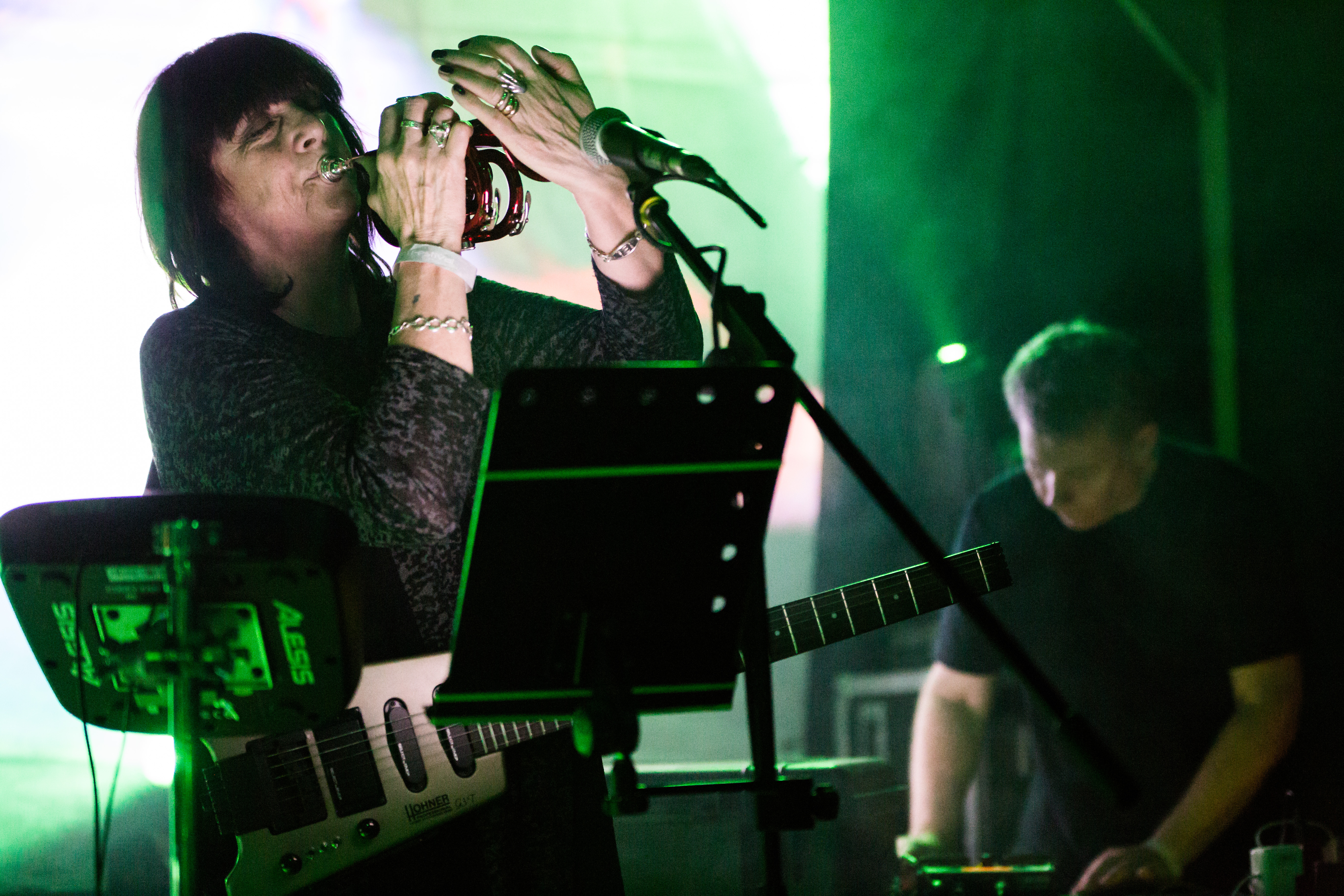
- Chris & Cosey performing in 2014

Background information
- Also known as: Carter Tutti, CTI, Conspiracy International, Carter Tutti Void
- Genres: Electronic; synth-pop; dance; post-industrial; minimal wave
- Years active: 1981–present
- Labels: Rough Trade; Conspiracy International; Nettwerk; Play It Again Sam; Staalplaat; Wax Trax!; World Serpent
- Members: Chris Carter; Cosey Fanni Tutti
- Website: chrisandcosey.com

Chris & Cosey, sometimes known as Carter Tutti, are an English musical duo formed in 1981, consisting of Chris Carter (electronics) and Cosey Fanni Tutti (voice, electronics, guitar, cornet). They founded the duo after the breakup of their earlier group Throbbing Gristle.

Since the release of their 1981 debut album Heartbeat, Chris & Cosey have expanded on the rhythmic ideas of Throbbing Gristle while adding synthesized pop elements to the harsh industrial music of Throbbing Gristle.

== History ==
When Throbbing Gristle broke up in 1981, members Carter and Tutti signed with Rough Trade Records and began recording as Chris & Cosey. They recorded four albums for the label using electronics, sampling, Cosey's vocals and cornet playing. In 1983, they formed their own independent record label Creative Technology Institute (aka CTI) to release more experimental works and collaborations. The first CTI projects, Elemental 7 and European Rendezvous, were released through Cabaret Voltaire's DoubleVision label.

In the late 1980s and early 1990s, the duo worked with a number of independent labels such as Nettwerk (Canada), Play It Again Sam (Belgium), Staalplaat (Netherlands), Wax Trax! (USA), and World Serpent Distribution (UK). In 1992, for artistic and health reasons, the duo stopped touring and concentrated on studio work. They returned to performing live in 1998, as documented on the Union album.

Since the couple began collaborating, Carter and Tutti have worked with a variety of similarly respected and recognized avant-garde artists including Monte Cazazza, Coil, Current 93, John Duncan, Erasure, Eurythmics, Boyd Rice, and Robert Wyatt. The 1988 album Core is a collection of these collaborations.

Carter and Tutti's tracks have been remixed by world-renowned DJs including Carl Craig, Cosmic Connection, Fred Giannelli, Daniel Miller, μ-Ziq, Vapourspace and Andrew Weatherall.

Carter and Tutti have released two ongoing CD series of instrumental music: The Library Of Sound (L.O.S.) and Electronic Ambient Remixes (E.A.R.), currently with four volumes each. The E.A.R. series are remixes of material released solo by Carter or Tutti. Tracks from both these instrumental series have been used internationally in gallery installations, performed at numerous electronic music festivals, utilized on TV and radio broadcasts and within Hollywood movie trailers.

=== 2000 to present ===
To greet the 21st century, Chris & Cosey became Carter Tutti, celebrating the rebirth with a series of concerts which were documented on the live album LEM Festival October 2003. The rebirth was completed by the release of the studio album Cabal later that year. Both also appeared as guests on the 2006 Current 93 album Black Ships Ate the Sky.

Carter and Tutti re-engaged with Throbbing Gristle, which reformed with all four original members for a December 2004 All Tomorrow's Parties festival appearance, and recorded several new studio albums over the following years – TG Now (2004) and Part Two (2007). They also performed a short series of concerts in Europe and the United States in 2009, with a rare tour-only release album, The Third Mind Movements. (Ostensibly, the few remaining copies were sold via mail-order through the Throbbing Gristle website upon completion of the tour).

In October 2010 Throbbing Gristle began a European tour; however, several days following the band's first tour date at the Hackney Dissenting Academy, London, Throbbing Gristle's website announced that Genesis P-Orridge was no longer willing to perform with the band, and would return home to New York. Chris, Cosey and Peter 'Sleazy' Christopherson finished the tour without P-Orridge, performing under the name X-TG.

Carter and Tutti performed with Nik Colk Void of Factory Floor at Mute's Short Circuit Festival in May 2011. A live album of the show, with an additional studio track, was released as Transverse in 2012, under the name Carter Tutti Void. The trio also released f (x) (2015) and Triumvirate (2019).

== Discography ==
=== Studio albums ===
- Heartbeat (Rough Trade, 1981)
- Trance (Rough Trade, 1982)
- Songs of Love & Lust (Rough Trade, 1984)
- Technø Primitiv (Rough Trade, 1985)
- Allotropy (Staalplaat, 1987)
- Sweet Surprise (Dragon, 1987)
- Exotika (Play It Again Sam, 1987)
- Trust (Play It Again Sam, 1989)
- Pagan Tango (Play It Again Sam/WaxTrax!, 1991)
- Musik Fantastique (Play It Again Sam, 1992)
- Twist (T&B Vinyl, 1995)
- Skimble Skamble (World Serpent, 1997)
- Cabal (as Carter Tutti; CTI, 2004)
- Feral Vapours of the Silver Ether (as Carter Tutti; CTI, 2007)
- f (x) (with Nik Colk Void, as Carter Tutti Void; Industrial Records, 2015)
- Triumvirate (with Nik Colk Void, as Carter Tutti Void; Conspiracy International, 2019)

=== Live albums ===
- Action! (LD, 1987)
- Union (World Serpent, 1999)
- C&C Luchtbal (CTI, 2003)
- LEM Festival October 2003 (as Carter Tutti; GliptotekaMagdalae, 2004)
- Transverse (with Nik Colk Void, as Carter Tutti Void; Mute, 2012)

as CTI

- Elemental 7 (DoubleVision, 1984)
- European Rendezvous – CTI Live 1983 (DoubleVision, 1984)
- Core (Nettwerk/Play It Again Sam, 1988)
- Metaphysical – "The library of sound" Edition One (World Serpent, 1993)
- Chronomanic – "The library of sound" Edition Two (World Serpent, 1994)
- In Continuum – "The library of sound" Edition Three (World Serpent, 1995)
- Point Seven – "The library of sound" Edition Four (World Serpent, 1998)

Compilations

- Collectiv One: Conspiracy International (Play It Again Sam, 1989)
- Collectiv Two: The Best of Chris and Cosey (Play It Again Sam, 1989)
- Collectiv Three: An Elemental Rendevous [sic] (Play It Again Sam, 1990)
- Collectiv Four: Archive Recordings (Play It Again Sam, 1990)
- Reflection (WaxTrax!, 1990)
- The Essential Chris & Cosey Collection (World Serpent, 2002)
- Collected Works 1981 – 2000 (Conspiracy International, 2006)

=== EPs ===
- Take Five (Licensed, 1986)
- C + C Musik (promotional only; T&B Vinyl, 1995)

=== Singles ===
- "Night Shift" (split with Minimal Compact; flexi-disc with Vinyl magazine; 1982)
- "This is Me" (split with Wahnfried-Brown; Music Time, 1983)
- "October (Love Song)" (Rough Trade, 1983)
- "Sweet Surprise" (Rough Trade, 1985)
- "Obsession" (Play It Again Sam, 1987)
- "Obsession (remix)" (Nettwerk, 1987)
- "Exotika" (Play It Again Sam, 1988)
- "Exotika (extended remix)" (Nettwerk, 1988)
- "Rise" (Play It Again Sam, 1988)
- "Synaesthesia" (Play It Again Sam, 1991)
- "Passion" (World Serpent, 1991)

as Conspiracy International

- "Hammer House" (CTI, 1984)
- "Thy Gift of Tongues" (CTI, 1985)

== Videos ==
- Live Vol. 1 (VHS; Conspiracy International, 1996)

== Bibliography ==
- Neal, Charles (1987). Tape Delay: Confessions from the Eighties Underground. SAF Publishing Ltd. ISBN 9780946719020 – via the Internet Archive.
- Reed, S. Alexander (2013). Assimilate: A Critical History of Industrial Music. Oxford University Press. ISBN 9780199832606 – via the Internet Archive.
- Whittaker, Simon (1999). "Chris & Cosey (CTI)". In Buckley, Jonathan; Duane, Orla; Ellingham, Mark; Spicer, Al (eds.). Rock: The Rough Guide (2nd ed.). London, New York: Rough Guides. p. 181. ISBN 1-85828-457-0 – via the Internet Archive.
