= 2t2 =

Studio album by Cosey Fanni Tutti
- Released: 13 June 2025
- Recorded: 2024–2025
- Length: 40:15
- Label: Conspiracy International
- Producer: Cosey Fanni Tutti

Cosey Fanni Tutti chronology
Delia Derbyshire: The Myths and the Legendary Tapes (2022)	2t2 (2025)

2t2 is a studio album by English musician and performance artist Cosey Fanni Tutti. It was released on 13 June 2025 through Conspiracy International. It received generally favorable reviews from critics.

== Background ==
Cosey Fanni Tutti is an English musician and performance artist. She has been a member of the groups COUM Transmissions, Throbbing Gristle, Chris & Cosey (also known as Carter Tutti), and Carter Tutti Void. 2t2 is her first solo album since Delia Derbyshire: The Myths and the Legendary Tapes (2022). It is a nine-track album composed, performed, and produced by herself. It was released on 13 June 2025 through Conspiracy International.

== Critical reception ==
Professional ratings
Aggregate scores
Source	Rating
Metacritic	77/100
Review scores
Source	Rating
Mojo	3/5 stars
MusicOMH	4/5 stars
Record Collector	4/5 stars
Uncut	8/10

According to the review aggregator Metacritic, 2t2 received "generally favorable reviews" based on a weighted average score of 77 out of 100 from 6 critic scores.

Jon Buckland of The Quietus commented that 2t2 "continues in much the same fertile vein as her post-Throbbing Gristle output." He added, "At the same time, it also appears a little more guarded, as if the candid moments in her early days have left her more cautious." Daryl Easlea of Record Collector wrote, "Inspired by personal and world issues, 2t2 is divided between rhythmic and meditative material, and it is never less than enthralling." Irina Shtreis of Mojo called the album "A challenging yet rewarding listen."

=== Accolades ===
Year-end lists for 2t2
Publication	List	Rank	Ref.
Crack	The Top 50 Albums of 2025	6	
The Quietus	The Quietus Albums of the Year 2025	40	
The Wire	Releases of the Year (2025 Rewind)	31	

== Track listing ==
All tracks are written by Cosey Fanni Tutti.

2t2 track listing
No.	Title	Length
1.	"Curæ"	5:07
2.	"To Be"	4:44
3.	"Stound"	4:08
4.	"Never the Same"	4:42
5.	"Stolen Time"	4:18
6.	"Respair"	3:34
7.	"Threnody"	4:18
8.	"Sonance"	5:15
9.	"Limbic"	4:14
Total length:		40:15

Notes

- The vinyl edition does not include "Limbic".

== Personnel ==
Credits adapted from liner notes.

- Cosey Fanni Tutti – performance, production

== Charts ==
Chart performance for 2t2
Chart (2025)	Peak position
UK Independent Albums (Official Charts)	36
