= Other, Like Me: The Oral History of COUM Transmissions and Throbbing Gristle =

2020 documentary film

- Opening titles
- Directed by: Marcus Werner Hed; Dan Fox
- Written by: Marcus Werner Hed; Dan Fox
- Produced by: Marcus Werner Hed
- Cinematography: Annika Aschberg; Marcus Werner Hed
- Edited by: Dan Fox; Mariko Montpetit; Jasper Verhorevoort
- Music by: Throbbing Gristle
- Production companies: BBC Television; Willow Glen Films
- Release date: 2020
- Running time: 82 minutes
- Countries: US, UK
- Language: English

Other, Like Me: The Oral History of COUM Transmissions and Throbbing Gristle (also known as Other, Like Me) is a 2020 American-British documentary film directed by Marcus Werner Hed and Dan Fox, about the music and art groups Throbbing Gristle and COUM Transmissions. It covers the history of both projects in archival film footage and photos and interviews with their members.

== Cast ==
- Genesis P-Orridge
- Cosey Fanni Tutti
- Les Maull
- John Lacey
- Spydee Gasmantell
- Foxtrot Echo
- Peter Christopherson
- Chris Carter

== Production and release ==
Other, Like Me was produced by BBC Television and co-director Hed's production company Willow Glen Films. It screened at various film festivals, including the IndieLisboa International Independent Film Festival, Portugal, and the Athens International Film Festival in 2020, and the CPH:DOX festival and the Chicago Underground Film Festival in 2021. A one-hour long version of the film was shown on BBC Four on 5 December 2021.

== Reception ==
Reviewing Other, Like Me for Buzz Magazine, Ben Woolhead noted the lack of an in-depth observation of gender politics in alternative culture, seeing ongoing gender and social divisions in Cosey Fanni Tutti's recounts of her being the only woman in COUM. Also, he missed an observation of COUM's and Throbbing Gristle's shock tactics, which included the repeated usage of national socialist iconography, which in his eyes paved the way for the blurring of the "lines between provocative art and outright political incitement" in the early 1980s experimental noise scene.

Writing for German newspaper taz, Andreas Hartmann found a "basically exciting" story in the formation of industrial music pioneers Throbbing Gristle out of the artist collective COUM, but criticised the lack of an outer perspective, as the film's only interview partners are the people directly involved. Reviewing the film again one year later in 2021, his judgement was more positive, calling it a long overdue, "really good introduction" to Throbbing Gristle's work, which featured excellent footage and emphasised Cosey Fanni Tutti's contribution to the band's radical aesthetics.

John Aizlewood of Radio Times commented that the film painted "a sometimes graphic picture of an extraordinary artistic phenomenon".
