= Heathen Earth =

1980 live album by Throbbing Gristle

Live album by Throbbing Gristle
- Released: June 1980
- Recorded: 16 February 1980
- Genre: Industrial
- Label: Industrial
- Producer: "Sinclair/Brooks"

Throbbing Gristle chronology
20 Jazz Funk Greats (1979)	Heathen Earth (1980)	Mission of Dead Souls (1981)

Heathen Earth is a live album by the English industrial band Throbbing Gristle, released in 1980 through Industrial Records.

== Background ==
Tracks 1–8 document a performance on 16 February 1980 at the Industrial Records studio for a small, invited audience. The audience are all credited by name on the album, including Jonas Almquist of the Leather Nun, Monte Cazazza (who shot the video of the performance), Geoff Rushton and Jon Savage. Also included on the CD editions are bonus tracks taken from their 1980 7" singles "Adrenalin" and "Subhuman".

== Release ==
Heathen Earth was originally released in 1980 on the band's label Industrial Records. The first pressing was limited to 785 copies on blue vinyl. The second pressing was on black vinyl. The first CD release was in 1991. Along with the rest of their albums, it was remastered by Chris Carter and re-released as a two-CD set in 2011. This edition divided the album into nine tracks instead of eight (track six was split in two) and listed official titles for the first time. The second CD consists of live recordings and single tracks.

== Critical reception ==
Professional ratings
Review scores
Source	Rating
AllMusic	3/5 stars
Pitchfork	(8.0/10)
The Quietus	favourable
The Rolling Stone Album Guide	3/5 stars

Pitchfork called Heathen Earth "slightly stiff relative to the unhinged and abrasive live sound captured on the TG24 boxset, which archives their scalding live gigs before frequently hostile crowds with less fidelity but more heart. [...] But it's a testimony to their precision that, for all their influence, nobody quite sounds like them when they are truly on blast, as they are here." The Quietus called it "more cohesive and marshalled" than any of Throbbing Gristle's other live albums and "a brilliantly weird album."

== Track listing ==
All tracks are written by Throbbing Gristle (Genesis P-Orridge, Cosey Fanni Tutti, Peter Christopherson, Chris Carter).

Side A
No.	Title	Length
1.	Untitled	26:33

Side B
No.	Title	Length
1.	Untitled	21:32

1991 CD edition
No.	Title	Length
1.	Untitled	4:38
2.	Untitled	6:39
3.	Untitled	7:17
4.	Untitled	7:46
5.	Untitled	7:44
6.	Untitled	4:56
7.	Untitled	7:33
8.	Untitled	1:05
9.	"Adrenalin"	3:59
10.	"Subhuman"	2:53

2011 CD edition - original album
No.	Title	Length
1.	"Cornet"	4:39
2.	"The Old Man Smiled"	6:41
3.	"Improvisation"	7:23
4.	"The World is a War Film"	7:42
5.	"Something Came Over Me"	7:49
6.	"Still Talking"	3:16
7.	"Bass"	1:38
8.	"Don't Do as You're Told, Do as You Think"	7:38
9.	"Painless Childbirth"	1:03

2011 CD edition - bonus disc
No.	Title	Length
1.	"Introduction (Sheffield University, 1980)"	0:35
2.	"Trained Condition of Obedience (SO36 Club, Berlin, 1980)"	3:30
3.	"Heathen Earth (Sheffield University, 1980)"	6:07
4.	"An Old Man Smiled (SO36 Club, Berlin, 1980)"	5:32
5.	"Auschwitz (Rafters, Manchester, 1980)"	5:19
6.	"Devil's Gateway (Rafters, Manchester, 1980)"	3:58
7.	"Punished (Sheffield University, 1980)"	5:53
8.	"Tortured Smiles (Sheffield University, 1980)"	2:51
9.	"We Said No (Sheffield University, 1980)"	5:29
10.	"Subhuman"	2:57
11.	"Adrenalin"	3:55

== Personnel ==
Throbbing Gristle

- Genesis P-Orridge – bass guitar
- Cosey Fanni Tutti – cornet, electric guitar
- Peter Christopherson – cornet, tape
- Chris Carter – drum programming, synthesiser

Technical

- "Sinclair/Brooks" – production
- Stan Bingo – engineering

== Charts ==
Chart (1980)	Peak position
UK Indie Chart	10
