= Urmur Bile Trax Volume 1 & 2 =

EP by μ-Ziq
- Released: January 27, 1997
- Genre: IDM, drill n bass
- Length: 45:49
- Label: Planet Mu US
- Producer: Mike Paradinas

Μ-Ziq chronology
Salsa With Mesquite (1994)	Urmur Bile Trax Volume 1 & 2 (1997)	My Little Beautiful (1997)

Urmur Bile Trax Volume 1 & 2 is a 1997 double EP by British electronic musician Mike Paradinas under his main moniker μ-ziq. Track 06 ("1 Hip 007") is a remix of "Phi * 1700 (U/V)" from the first μ-Ziq album Tango n' Vectif. Track 08 ("The Phonic Socks") is a remix of "The Sonic Fox", also from the first album.

Professional ratings
Review scores
Source	Rating
AllMusic	2/5 stars
Robert Christgau	(dud)

== Track listing ==
1. "Urmur Bile" - 9.09
2. "Let Let" - 7.12
3. "M5 Saabtone" - 10.08
4. "Fine Tuning" - 6.14
5. "The Hydrozone" - 6.18
6. "1 Hip 007" - 12.52
7. "Hornet" - 8.41
8. "The Phonic Socks" - 7.05
