= Regional arts board =

The regional arts boards (formerly regional arts associations) were English regional subdivisions of the Arts Council of Great Britain.

== History ==
As the Arts Council began to move away from organising art activities in the 1950s, regional offices in England were restructured as regional art associations (RAAs). The new RAAs were intermediate organisations acting as a link between the Arts Council and the regions set up by local authorities or consortiums of local arts associations. By 1971 there were twelve associations providing funding and advice for arts organisations. From the early 1970s they became the responsibility of the Council's Regional Development Department. When that Department was disbanded in 1976, the RAAs came under the then Deputy Secretary General, Angus Stirling, until 1980 when a Regional Department was formed.

The Wilding report of 1989 recommended the RAAs should be replaced as there was significant differences in distribution of funding between different regions. They were replaced by 10 Regional Arts Boards (RABs) in 1990. The new Boards received the majority of their funding directly from the Arts Council rather than local sources. This changed the nature and structure of regional arts. These were independent non-profit limited by guarantee companies with some local authority representation on their management boards, but the democratic role and the link between subscription and governance was broken. Payment of a subscription did not guarantee a seat or a vote.

After the Arts Council of Great Britain was abolished in 1994, the RABs were transferred to a new single body: Arts Council England. In 2001 it was announced that the RABS would be abolished in an effort to streamline the administration of Arts Council England. The Boards closed in April 2002 and smaller regional offices were maintained in the regions, except the South East Board which became part of southern region, to bring them into line with the then regional development agency areas.

== Regional Arts Associations (from 1956-1990) ==
- East Midlands
- Eastern Arts (Established 1971)
- Greater London
- Lincolnshire & Humberside
- Merseyside
- North West
- Northern
- South East
- South West Arts (Established 1956)
- Southern
- West Midlands
- Yorkshire

== Regional Arts Boards (1990-2002) ==
- Eastern Arts
- East Midlands Arts
- London Arts Board
- Northern Arts
- North West Arts Board
- South East Arts Board
- Southern Arts
- South West Arts
- West Midlands Arts
- Yorkshire and Humberside Arts
