= Triumvirate (Carter Tutti Void album) =

Studio album by Carter Tutti Void
- Released: 30 August 2019
- Genre: Electronic
- Length: 41:11
- Label: Conspiracy International

Carter Tutti Void chronology
f (x) (2015)	Triumvirate (2019)

Triumvirate is the third album by Carter Tutti Void, a collaborative project between Chris Carter, Cosey Fanni Tutti, and Nik Colk Void. It was released on 30 August 2019 through Conspiracy International.

== Background ==
Chris Carter and Cosey Fanni Tutti were members of the group Throbbing Gristle, while Nik Colk Void is a member of the group Factory Floor. The trio previously released Transverse (2012) and f (x) (2015). Triumvirate is their third album in total and their second studio album. The album was recorded at Carter and Tutti's Norfolk studio. It was released on 30 August 2019 through Conspiracy International.

== Critical reception ==
Professional ratings
Review scores
Source	Rating
AllMusic	3.5/5 stars
Crack	8/10
Loud and Quiet	8/10

Paul Simpson of AllMusic wrote, "Carter's sequenced rhythmic explorations flow underneath waves of slashing guitars and striking feedback effects played by Tutti and Void, and the three artists are perpetually tuned into the same spiritual wavelength, so that every brushstroke on the sonic landscape seems perfectly in place." Fergal Kinney of Loud and Quiet stated, "Though all three musicians operate firmly within electronic parameters, let's not forget that they've all made much more psychedelic (and in the case of Chris and Cosey, pastoral) music than many of their electronic contemporaries."

=== Accolades ===
Year-end lists for Triumvirate
Publication	List	Rank	Ref.
Crack	The Top 50 Albums of the Year	11	
Louder Than War	Albums of the Year 2019	34	
The Quietus	Quietus Albums of the Year 2019	86	

== Track listing ==
Triumvirate track listing
No.	Title	Length
1.	"T3.2"	7:17
2.	"T3.3"	6:34
3.	"T3.4"	6:49
4.	"T3.5"	6:26
5.	"T3.1"	7:04
6.	"T3.6"	7:01
Total length:		41:11

== Personnel ==
Credits adapted from liner notes.

- Chris Carter
- Cosey Fanni Tutti
- Nik Void

== Charts ==
Chart performance for Triumvirate
Chart (2019)	Peak position
UK Dance Albums (Official Charts)	17
UK Independent Albums (Official Charts)	33
