= Grush (album) =

Studio album by μ-Ziq
- Released: 14 June 2024
- Genre: Electronic
- Length: 56:19
- Label: Planet Mu
- Producer: Mike Paradinas

μ-Ziq chronology
1977 (2023)	Grush (2024)	1979 (2025)

Grush is a studio album by English record producer Mike Paradinas under the pseudonym μ-Ziq. It was released on 14 June 2024 through his record label Planet Mu. It received universal acclaim from critics.

== Background ==
Mike Paradinas, also known as μ-Ziq, is an English record producer. He released 1977 in 2023 through Balmat. Much of Grush was created in hotel rooms on tour. The songs were road-tested during his live shows, with his touring partner and visual artist Jan Moravec providing feedback. "Manscape" is a remix of Meemo Comma's song "Cloudscape". The album was released on 14 June 2024 through his record label Planet Mu.

== Critical reception ==
Professional ratings
Aggregate scores
Source	Rating
Metacritic	82/100
Review scores
Source	Rating
AllMusic	4/5 stars
Pitchfork	7.6/10

According to the review aggregator Metacritic, Grush received "universal acclaim" based on a weighted average score of 82 out of 100 from 4 critic scores.

Paul Simpson of AllMusic stated, "While drawing on '90s jungle and IDM for inspiration, the tracks are also filtered through more modern influences like footwork and trap, and they're often more club-friendly than earlier μ-Ziq efforts, having been developed on tour and road-tested at live gigs." He added, "Grush clearly finds μ-Ziq in comfortable territory, but he's still trying new things, and his work is still highly enjoyable." Bill Pearis of BrooklynVegan commented that "nobody else makes music quite like this, putting ambient, techno, jungle and drill-and-bass into a blender for a unique sliced up breakbeat cocktail." He called the album "another welcome addition in the discography of one of the most distinctive electronic talents of the last three decades." Ben Cardew of Pitchfork wrote, "Anyone who loves Aphex Twin's Hangable Auto Bulb EPs or Paradinas' own 1997 album Lunatic Harness will find much to love in Grush's vibrant melodies and intricately funky rhythms."

=== Accolades ===
Year-end lists for Grush
Publication	List	Rank	Ref.
AllMusic	Favorite Electronic Albums	—	

== Track listing ==
All tracks are written by Mike Paradinas.

Grush track listing
No.	Title	Length
1.	"Reticulum A"	4:29
2.	"Hyper Daddy"	5:25
3.	"Fogou"	2:45
4.	"Magic Pony Ride (Pt. 4)"	2:48
5.	"Imperial Crescent"	3:42
6.	"Reticulum B"	3:45
7.	"Grush"	3:09
8.	"Belvedere"	3:33
9.	"Raver"	3:06
10.	"Windsor Safari Park"	5:35
11.	"Hastings"	2:47
12.	"Manscape"	5:23
13.	"Metaphonk"	5:05
14.	"Reticulum C"	4:46
Total length:		56:19

== Personnel ==
Credits adapted from liner notes.

- Mike Paradinas – production
- Beau Thomas – mastering
- Tyrone Williams – artwork, photography

== Charts ==
Chart performance for Grush
Chart (2024)	Peak position
UK Album Downloads (OCC)	42
UK Dance Albums (OCC)	5
UK Independent Albums (OCC)	41
