= Tutti (album) =

Studio album by Cosey Fanni Tutti
- Released: 8 February 2019
- Length: 38:20
- Label: Conspiracy International

Cosey Fanni Tutti chronology
Time to Tell (1983)	Tutti (2019)	Delia Derbyshire: The Myths and the Legendary Tapes (2022)

Tutti is a studio album by English musician Cosey Fanni Tutti. It was released on 8 February 2019 through Conspiracy International. Despite her prolific output in the bands Throbbing Gristle and Chris & Cosey, Tutti is her first solo album in 36 years, since 1983's Time to Tell.

== Production ==
The release follows the publication of her autobiographical book Art Sex Music in 2017. According to Tutti, this album is a summation of her life's work, expressing both her past and her present being. The album was originally composed as the soundtrack to Harmonic COUMaction, an autobiographical film shown at the opening ceremony of Hull UK City of Culture in 2017.

== Critical reception ==
Professional ratings
Aggregate scores
Source	Rating
Metacritic	69/100
Review scores
Source	Rating
The Guardian	2/5 stars
NME	4/5 stars
Loud and Quiet	8/10

According to the review aggregator Metacritic, Tutti received "generally favorable reviews" based on a weighted average score of 69 out of 100 from 8 critic scores.

On its release in February 2019, Tutti reached number 21 in the top 50 UK independent albums chart. According to Charlotte Krol's review for the NME, the album is 'contemporary in overall tone', but also relates to the electronic music of the 1990s and 1980s.

=== Accolades ===
Year-end lists for Tutti
Publication	List	Rank	Ref.
The Quietus	Quietus Albums of the Year 2019	40	

== Track listing ==
All tracks are written by Cosey Fanni Tutti.

Tutti track listing
No.	Title	Length
1.	"Tutti"	4:54
2.	"Drone"	4:25
3.	"Moe"	4:28
4.	"Sophic Ripple"	4:38
5.	"Split"	5:01
6.	"Heliy"	5:18
7.	"En"	4:28
8.	"Orenda"	4:49
Total length:		38:20

== Personnel ==
Credits adapted from liner notes.

- Cosey Fanni Tutti – performance

== Charts ==
Chart performance for Tutti
Chart (2019)	Peak position
UK Independent Albums (Official Charts)	21
