= 1977 (Mike Paradinas album) =

2023 studio album by Mike Paradinas

Studio album by μ-Ziq
- Released: April 7, 2023
- Genres: ambient, jungle, house
- Length: 67:44
- Label: Balmat

μ-Ziq chronology
Magic Pony Ride (2022)	1977 (2023)	Grush (2024)

Singles from 1977
- 1. "4am" Released: February 17, 2023; 2. "Burnt Orange" Released: March 17, 2023

Professional ratings
Review scores
Source	Rating
Crack	6/10

1977 is the 15th studio album by English electronic producer Mike Paradinas under the name μ-Ziq. It was released on April 7, 2023 via Balmat, a Spanish label based in Barcelona. The album was described by critics to be ambient, jungle, and house. Steve Young writing for Igloo Magazine noted that it is similar to older albums of Paradinas, such as Tango N' Vectif.

Lara Rix-Martin, Paradinas' wife, is featured in the title track under the moniker Meemo Comma.

== Tracklist ==
All tracks are written by Mike Paradinas.

No.	Title	Length
1.	"4am"	4:13
2.	"Éire"	6:22
3.	"Allegro"	4:33
4.	"Houzz 13"	5:03
5.	"Belt & Carpet"	3:58
6.	"Marmite"	6:27
7.	"Asda"	2:48
8.	"1977" (featuring Meemo Comma)	5:36
9.	"Xolbe 3"	5:59
10.	"Burnt Orange"	3:18
11.	"Lime Aero"	4:31
12.	"Reference Gravy"	2:34
13.	"Mesolithic Jungle"	4:16
14.	"Pillowy"	3:08
15.	"Froglets"	4:58
Total length:		67:44

== Personnel ==
Credits adapted from liner notes.

- Mike Paradinas – writer, producer, performer
- Pedro Pina – masterer
- José Quintanar – cover artist
- Basora – designer

== Charts ==
Chart performance for 1977
Chart (2023)	Peak position
UK Album Downloads (Official Charts)	34
UK Independent Albums (Official Charts)	47
