= 1977 (disambiguation) =

1977 was a common year starting on Saturday of the Gregorian calendar.

1977 may also refer to:

- 1977 (Ana Tijoux album), the fifth studio album by Latin hip hop artist Ana Tijoux
- 1977 (Ash album), the first official album by Ash
- 1977 (Mike Paradinas album), the fifteenth studio album by Mike Paradinas
- 1977 (Sirenia album), the eleventh studio album by Sirenia
- 1977 (The-Dream album), an album by American R&B recording artist The-Dream
- 1977 (film), a Tamil language film released in 2009
- "1977" (song), a song by the English punk rock band The Clash
- 1977 (band), a Canadian indie pop band
