= Magic Pony Ride =

Studio album by μ-Ziq
- Released: 10 June 2022
- Length: 51:22
- Label: Planet Mu
- Producer: Mike Paradinas

Μ-Ziq chronology
Scurlage (2021)	Magic Pony Ride (2022)	1977 (2023)

Magic Pony Ride is a studio album by English record producer Mike Paradinas under the pseudonym μ-Ziq. It was released on 10 June 2022 through his record label Planet Mu. It received generally favorable reviews from critics.

== Background ==
Mike Paradinas, also known as μ-Ziq, is an English record producer. Magic Pony Ride is his first studio album as μ-Ziq since Scurlage (2021). It consists of 12 tracks. According to The Guardian, the album drew inspiration from "the process of remastering his classic LP Lunatic Harness, as well as familial introspection and an idyllic holiday horse-riding in Iceland." His daughter Elka provides vocals on "Picksing" and "Elka's Song". "Galope" is dedicated to his late father. Paradinas created the album entirely on a computer. The album was released on 10 June 2022 through his record label Planet Mu.

Prior to the album's release, He released the Goodbye EP (2022) and the Goodbye Remixes EP (2022). After the album's release, he released the Hello EP (2022) and the Galope EP (2023).

== Critical reception ==
Professional ratings
Aggregate scores
Source	Rating
Metacritic	75/100
Review scores
Source	Rating
AllMusic	4/5 stars
The Guardian	3/5 stars
MusicOMH	3.5/5 stars
Pitchfork	6.5/10

According to the review aggregator Metacritic, Magic Pony Ride received "generally favorable reviews" based on a weighted average score of 75 out of 100 from 6 critic scores.

Paul Simpson of AllMusic commented that "The beats on Magic Pony Ride are more inspired by jungle and breakbeat hardcore than anything Paradinas has recorded since the 2000s, but they aren't nearly as unhinged or manic as those on Lunatic Harness, and the melodies don't quite tap into the singular mixture of fear and excitement that made the previous album so riveting." Ben Devlin of MusicOMH wrote, "Magic Pony Ride might not be the most ambitious record in the world, or in Paradinas' discography, but the music accomplishes its stated goals and is enjoyable in the process."

Tayyab Amin of The Guardian commented that "Magic Pony Ride excels when it is carefree and cantering, losing its allure when it stops to let reality sink in." Jude Noel of Pitchfork stated, "While Magic Pony Ride retains the gummy textures of his recent oeuvre, it is unusual in its overt nostalgia."

== Track listing ==
All tracks are written by Mike Paradinas.

Magic Pony Ride track listing
No.	Title	Length
1.	"Magic Pony Ride (Pt.1)"	3:50
2.	"Uncle Daddy"	5:28
3.	"Picksing"	1:48
4.	"Unless"	6:09
5.	"Turquoise Hyperfizz"	5:16
6.	"Galope"	3:16
7.	"Goodbye"	5:10
8.	"Brown Chaos"	2:56
9.	"Shulem's Theme"	4:23
10.	"Elka's Song"	3:20
11.	"Magic Pony Ride (Pt.2)"	3:09
12.	"Don't Tell Me (It's Ending)"	6:36
Total length:		51:22

== Personnel ==
Credits adapted from liner notes.

- Mike Paradinas – production, performance
- Beau Thomas – mastering
- Ben Curzon – design
- Tyrone Williams – photography

== Charts ==
Chart performance for Magic Pony Ride
Chart (2022)	Peak position
UK Album Downloads (OCC)	35
UK Independent Albums (OCC)	31
