= Lessons in Chemistry =

Lessons in Chemistry may refer to:

- Lessons in Chemistry (novel), a 2022 book by Bonnie Garmus
- Lessons in Chemistry (miniseries), a 2023 Apple TV+ miniseries starring Brie Larson

== See also ==
- Chemistry Lessons: Volume One, album by Chris Carter
