= Brace Yourself =

Brace Yourself may refer to:

== Music ==
- Brace Yourself (album), by Dropping Daylight, 2006
- Brace Yourself (EP), by μ-ziq (Mike Paradinas), 1998
- "Brace Yourself", a song by Howie Day from Stop All the World Now, 2003
- "Brace Yourself", a song by A Loss for Words, 2013
- "Brace Yourself", a video shown at the beginning of concerts during Michael Jackson's Dangerous World Tour, 1992–1993
- ”Brace Yourself”, an alternative-rock band from Tucson, Arizona. Their debut-album aired in 2020. (Currently active.)
- "Brace Urself", an unreleased song by SZA

== Other uses ==
- "Brace Yourself" (Braceface), a 2001 TV episode
- "Brace Yourself" (The Brady Bunch), a 1970 TV episode
- Brace Yourself Games, a Canadian video game developer
