= F (x) (album) =

f (x)

Studio album by Carter Tutti Void
- Released: 11 September 2015
- Genre: Electronic
- Length: 52:36
- Label: Industrial

Carter Tutti Void chronology
Transverse (2012)	f (x) (2015)	Triumvirate (2019)

f (x) is the second album by Carter Tutti Void, a collaborative project between Chris Carter, Cosey Fanni Tutti, and Nik Colk Void. It was released on 11 September 2015 through Industrial Records. It received generally favorable reviews from critics.

== Background ==
Chris Carter and Cosey Fanni Tutti were members of the group Throbbing Gristle, while Nik Colk Void is a member of the group Factory Floor. In 2012, the trio released Transverse under the name Carter Tutti Void. f (x) is their second album in total, and it is their first proper studio album. The album was released on 11 September 2015 through Industrial Records.

== Critical reception ==
Professional ratings
Aggregate scores
Source	Rating
Metacritic	71/100
Review scores
Source	Rating
AllMusic	4/5 stars
Crack	8/10
Drowned in Sound	8/10
Louder Than War	10/10

According to the review aggregator Metacritic, f (x) received "generally favorable reviews" based on a weighted average score of 71 out of 100 from 4 critic scores.

David Jeffries of AllMusic wrote, "Six tracks are offered, all of them designed like sound sculptures or tape loops that slowly develop, dissolve, and then return to a robotic heart-throbbing beat." Tom Watson of Crack stated, "As a three-piece, their contributions are mammoth yet the sounds are overtly minimal." Luke Turner of The Quietus commented that "f (x) is a record, sure, released on vinyl, digital and compact disc, but it's also a mantra, an inspiration, a bold and pure statement." Simon Tucker of Louder Than War described the album as "a twisted fantasy that captures the mind and sends it back to times of feverish dreams and hallucinations, a swim in the ocean at night where excitement meets trepidation and where what's going on underneath is at once worrying but also fascinating."

=== Accolades ===
Year-end lists for f (x)
Publication	List	Rank	Ref.
AllMusic	Favorite Electronic Albums	—	
The Quietus	The Quietus Albums of 2015	4	
The Wire	Releases of the Year (2015 Rewind)	41	

== Track listing ==
All music is composed by Chris Carter, Cosey Fanni Tutti, and Nik Colk Void.

f (x) track listing
No.	Title	Length
1.	"f = (2.4)"	10:33
2.	"f = (2.5)"	9:12
3.	"f = (2.2)"	9:17
4.	"f = (2.3)"	7:32
5.	"f = (2.6)"	8:04
6.	"f = (2.7)"	7:58
Total length:		52:36

Notes

- The vinyl edition does not include "f = (2.2)".

== Personnel ==
Credits adapted from liner notes.

- Chris Carter – performance
- Cosey Fanni Tutti – performance
- Nik Colk Void – performance

== Charts ==
Chart performance for f (x)
Chart (2015)	Peak position
UK Independent Album Breakers (OCC)	14
UK Record Store (OCC)	23
