= Meast =

Studio album by Kid Spatula
- Released: 2004
- Genre: Electronica
- Label: Planet Mu

Kid Spatula chronology
Full Sunken Breaks (2000)	Meast (2004)

Meast is an album by Mike Paradinas released in 2004 under his moniker "Kid Spatula." It compiles a selection of previously unreleased tracks written between 1994 and 1998, spanning two discs.

== Track listing ==
Disc 1:

1. "Housewife" 3:55
2. "Shistner's Bassflex" 3:01
3. "Spacious Hallway" 2:16
4. "Further 2" 4:36
5. "Tugboat" 5:58
6. "P.V." 1:29
7. "Local Jogger" 3:40
8. "Harpsichord" 2:10
9. "Trike" 4:09
10. "Residue" 1:40
11. "Carrier" 4:42
12. "Disclosed" 5:59
13. "Jackal" 4:40
14. "It Starts With Bongos" 4:48
15. "Squirms" 5:26
16. "Bobby" 6:00
17. "Grandwash" 5:24

Disc 2:

1. "Sad & Solid" 5:33
2. "Off Lemon" 3:18
3. "Orange Crumble" 4:08
4. "Detlev Bronk" 3:10
5. "Upton" 3:28
6. "Weiro" 4:55
7. "Peg" 4:46
8. "Lesque" 2:40
9. "Mocaseg" 6:27
10. "Go Ya Lo" 4:56
11. "Measty" 3:28
12. "Member" 4:48
13. "Mighty Softstep" 2:39
14. "My Piano & Me" 4:44
15. "Round &" 1:23
16. "Buttress" 4:18
17. "Broccoli" 5:16

Recorded in Somerset Avenue 1994: 2-01
Recorded in Merton High Street 1995: 1-12
Recorded in Strone Road 1996: 1-17, 2-02, 2-04, 2-09
Recorded in Albert Road 1997: 1-02, 1-03, 1-04, 1-06, 1-09, 1-14, 1-16, 2-03, 2-05, 2-06, 2-07, 2-10, 2-11, 2-13, 2-14
Recorded in Albert Road 1998: 1-01, 1-05, 1-07, 1-08, 1-10, 1-11, 1-13, 1-15, 2-08, 2-15, 2-16, 2-17
No date is listed for track 2-12.
