= Spatula Freak =

Studio album by Kid Spatula
- Released: November 7, 1995
- Genre: Electronica
- Length: 50:18
- Label: Reflective Records
- Producer: Mike Paradinas

Kid Spatula chronology
Spatula Freak (1995)	Full Sunken Breaks (2000)

Professional ratings
Review scores
Source	Rating
Allmusic	link
Muzik	4/5 stars

Spatula Freak is the debut album by Kid Spatula, an alias for Mike Paradinas. It was released in 1995 on Reflective Records. There was an initial limited release LP with alternate, hand-printed artwork on the outer sleeve and prismatic reflective labels on the LP disc.

== Track listing ==
=== CD release ===
1. Dance 3 - 5:54
2. Chisholm - 3:37
3. Xvon - 4:26
4. Trunk - 6:05
5. Cough - 5:19
6. Vampires - 6:56
7. Get Up T - 6:53
8. Metal Thing #1 - 5:33
9. Not Human - 5:35

=== Vinyl release ===
==== Side one ====
1. Dance 3 - 5:54
2. Chisholm - 3:37
3. Xvon - 4:26

==== Side two ====
1. Trunk - 6:05
2. Cough - 5:19

==== Side three ====
1. Vampires - 6:56
2. Get Up T - 6:53

==== Side four ====
1. Metal Thing #1 - 5:33
2. Not Human - 5:35
