= Factory Floor (album) =

Studio album by Factory Floor
- Released: 6 September 2013
- Recorded: Mono House, North London
- Genre: Minimal wave, tech house, acid house, dance-punk
- Length: 53:18
- Label: DFA
- Producer: Factory Floor

Factory Floor chronology
| Factory Floor (2013) | 25 25 (2016) |

Singles from Factory Floor
- 1. "Two Different Ways" Released: 14 November 2011; 2. "Fall Back" Released: 15 January 2013

Professional ratings
Aggregate scores
| Source | Rating |
|---|---|
| AnyDecentMusic? | 7.8/10 |
| Metacritic | 79/100 |
Review scores
| Source | Rating |
| AllMusic | 4/5 stars |
| The Irish Times | 4/5 stars |
| Mojo | 4/5 stars |
| NME | 8/10 |
| The Observer | 3/5 stars |
| Pitchfork | 8.2/10 |
| Record Collector | 4/5 stars |
| Resident Advisor | 4.0/5 |
| Uncut | 7/10 |
| XLR8R | 9/10 |

Factory Floor is the debut studio album by English electronic music band Factory Floor, released on 6 September 2013 by DFA Records. The band produced and recorded the album in Mono House, their North London warehouse.

== Track listing ==
All tracks are written by Factory Floor

| No. | Title | Length |
|---|---|---|
| 1. | "Turn It Up" | 6:15 |
| 2. | "Here Again" | 8:09 |
| 3. | "One" | 0:48 |
| 4. | "Fall Back" | 7:24 |
| 5. | "Two" | 1:04 |
| 6. | "How You Say" | 6:27 |
| 7. | "Two Different Ways" | 8:15 |
| 8. | "Three" | 1:43 |
| 9. | "Work Out" | 6:35 |
| 10. | "Breathe In" | 6:38 |

Japanese edition bonus track
| No. | Title | Length |
|---|---|---|
| 11. | "Two Different Ways" (Richard H. Kirk Remix) | 6:10 |

== Charts ==
| Chart (2013) | Peak position |
|---|---|
| Belgian Albums Chart (Flanders) | 157 |
| Belgian Albums Chart (Wallonia) | 185 |
| UK Albums Chart | 63 |
| UK Dance Albums Chart | 18 |
| UK Indie Albums Chart | 14 |
| US Dance/Electronic Albums | 20 |

== Release history ==
| Region | Date | Format | Label |
|---|---|---|---|
| Australia | 6 September 2013 | CD; digital download | [PIAS] Australia |
| Germany | 6 September 2013 | CD; digital download | [PIAS] Cooperative |
| United Kingdom | 6 September 2013 | Digital download | DFA Records |
| United Kingdom | 9 September 2013 | CD; LP | DFA Records |
| United States | 9 September 2013 | Digital download | DFA Records |
| Japan | 11 September 2013 | CD; digital download | P-Vine Records |
| United States | 17 September 2013 | CD; LP | DFA Records |
| Germany | 20 September 2013 | LP | [PIAS] Cooperative |
