= Salsa with Mesquite =

EP by μ-Ziq
- Released: September 18, 1995
- Recorded: 1995
- Genre: IDM
- Length: 46:37
- Label: Hi-Rise UK/Astralwerks US
- Producer: Mike Paradinas

Μ-Ziq chronology
The Auteurs Vs μ-Ziq (1994)	Salsa with Mesquite (1995)	In Pine Effect (1995)

Professional ratings
Review scores
Source	Rating
Allmusic	2.5/5 stars

Salsa with Mesquite is the second EP from British intelligent dance music producer μ-Ziq. It was released on September 18, 1995, on the Astralwerks record label in the US and Hi-Rise in the UK. It is a pre-album EP to be followed up by In Pine Effect. The title comes from a flavour of Kettle Chips.

== Track listing ==
1. "Salsa with Mesquite" - 7:25
2. "Happi" - 6:31
3. "Loam" - 6:08
4. "Reflectiv" - 6:52
5. "Leonard" - 6:05
6. "Balsa Lightning" - 6:49
7. "Balsa Lightning (Jake Slazenger Remix)" - 6:42

Notes: released as a Digipak in the UK and Standard Compact Disc in the US.
