= Full Sunken Breaks =

2000 studio album by Kid Spatula

Studio album by Kid Spatula
- Released: April 17, 2000
- Genre: Electronica
- Label: Planet Mu

Kid Spatula chronology
Spatula Freak (1995)	Full Sunken Breaks (2000)	Meast (2004)

Professional ratings
Review scores
Source	Rating
Allmusic	4/5 stars

Full Sunken Breaks is an album by Mike Paradinas released in 2000 under his moniker "Kid Spatula."

== Track listing ==
1. "Dirtwah" - 3:57
2. "Come on Board" - 3:02
3. "Nordy" - 3:36
4. "Hard Love" - 5:42
5. "New School Bikes" - 4:50
6. "Epic Blusta" - 2:28
7. "Otdok" - 1:38
8. "XXX" - 2:43
9. "Dancing Demons" - 3:18
10. "Milk Bottle Tops" - 4:16
11. "Another Fresh Style" - 2:27
12. "Manfright" - 1:01
13. "Beaver" - 3:43
14. "Snorkmaiden" - 3:21
15. "Jar Jar Binx" - 4:20
16. "Qisope" - 2:29
17. "Not The Fear" - 4:33
18. "Kid Spatulet" - 4:56
19. "Hill Street Blues" - 1:31
20. "Full Sunken Breaks" - 5:03
