= Chewed Corners =

Studio album by μ-Ziq
- Released: June 24, 2013
- Genre: IDM, electronic, ambient
- Label: Planet Mu

μ-Ziq chronology
Duntisbourne Abbots Soulmate Devastation Technique (2007)	Chewed Corners (2013)	Aberystwyth Marine (2016)

Professional ratings
Aggregate scores
Source	Rating
Metacritic	76/100
Review scores
Source	Rating
Allmusic	3.5/5 stars
Drowned in Sound	7/10
MusicOMH	4/5 stars
PopMatters	8/10
Pitchfork	7.1/10

Chewed Corners is the ninth studio album from English electronic musician μ-Ziq. It was released in June 2013 under Planet Mu Records. It was used as μ-Ziq's set during the Bang Face 2012 weekender in Cornwall.

== Track list ==
No.	Title	Length
1.	"Taikon"	5:17
2.	"Christ Dust"	3:01
3.	"Wipe"	4:42
4.	"Monyth"	1:45
5.	"Twangle Melkas"	2:49
6.	"Melting Bas"	3:36
7.	"Houzz 10"	5:31
8.	"Feeble Minded"	4:30
9.	"Hug"	2:58
10.	"Mountain Island Boner"	4:08
11.	"Tickly Flanks"	3:30
12.	"Smooch"	3:41
13.	"Gunnar"	4:37
14.	"Weakling Paradinas"	7:33
15.	"Rediffusion"	54:22

- Rediffusion was included as a bonus with the online MP3/WAV and vinyl format release
