= Duntisbourne Abbots Soulmate Devastation Technique =

Studio album by μ-Ziq
- Released: 20 August 2007
- Genre: IDM
- Length: 59:55
- Label: Planet Mu
- Producer: Mike Paradinas

Μ-Ziq chronology
Bilious Paths (2003)	Duntisbourne Abbots Soulmate Devastation Technique (2007)	Chewed Corners (2013)

Professional ratings
Review scores
Source	Rating
AllMusic	4/5 stars
BBC Collective	3.5/5 stars
The Milk Factory	2.5/5
PopMatters	5/10 stars
Tiny Mix Tapes	4.5/5 stars

Duntisbourne Abbots Soulmate Devastation Technique is the seventh studio album by British IDM producer μ-Ziq, released on Planet Mu in 2007.

== Track listing ==
All tracks are written by Mike Paradinas, except "Acid Steak Night" written by Libby Floyd and Mike Paradinas.

No.	Title	Length
1.	"Prongh Seemness"	3:08
2.	"Duntisbourne Abbots"	2:01
3.	"Dexedrine Girl"	2:53
4.	"Woozy"	2:54
5.	"2CV"	2:33
6.	"Eggshell"	3:03
7.	"Dirtylush Stinkwife"	3:37
8.	"Strawberry Fields Hotel"	3:58
9.	"Pons Pons"	4:45
10.	"Old & Tired"	2:57
11.	"Rise of the Salmon"	3:52
12.	"Something Else"	3:24
13.	"Insomnia"	3:01
14.	"Painshill Park"	2:18
15.	"Acid Steak Night"	5:54
16.	"Eggshell 2"	4:03
17.	"Drum Light"	5:37

== Personnel ==
- Mike Paradinas – producer
- Matt Colton – mastering
