= Sweet Surprise =

Single by Annie Lennox
- Released: 1985
- Recorded: 1985
- Genre: Electronic
- Length: 4:34
- Label: Rough Trade
- Songwriter(s): Lennox; Carter Tutti; Stewart

Annie Lennox singles chronology
"Sweet Surprise" (1985)	"Put a Little Love in Your Heart" (1988)

Sweet Surprise is a song by Annie Lennox, Chris & Cosey and Dave Stewart, released in 1985 as a 7-inch through Rough Trade UK Records.

== Track listing ==
=== UK 7" (#RTT 148) ===
1. "Sweet Surprise I" - 4:34
2. "Sweet Surprise II" - 6:22

== Notes ==
Recorded on 8-track and 24-track at Eurythmics Studio, DEC Camden Town, London, The Church, Hornsey, London and S47, Norfolk.
