= Transverse (album) =

2012 studio album by Carter Tutti Void

Live album / studio album by Carter Tutti Void
- Released: 26 March 2012
- Genre: Electronic
- Length: 49:18
- Label: Mute

Carter Tutti Void chronology
Transverse (2012)	f (x) (2015)

Transverse is the debut album by Carter Tutti Void, a collaborative project between Chris Carter, Cosey Fanni Tutti, and Nik Colk Void. It was released on 26 March 2012 through Mute Records. It received generally favorable reviews from critics.

== Background ==
Chris Carter and Cosey Fanni Tutti were members of the group Throbbing Gristle, while Nik Colk Void is a member of the group Factory Floor. The material on Transverse was created in a studio. The album contains live recording and studio recording: Tracks 1 to 4 were recorded live at the Roundhouse, London, on 13 May 2011; track 5 is a studio recording.

== Critical reception ==
Professional ratings
Aggregate scores
Source	Rating
Metacritic	72/100
Review scores
Source	Rating
AllMusic	4/5 stars
Fact	4.5/5 stars
The Independent	3/5 stars
MusicOMH	4.5/5 stars
NME	3/5 stars
Pitchfork	7.5/10
Record Collector	4/5 stars
Resident Advisor	4/5
The Skinny	4/5 stars
Spin	8/10

According to the review aggregator Metacritic, Transverse received "generally favorable reviews" based on a weighted average score of 72 out of 100 from 14 critic scores.

Steve Shaw of Fact commented that "Transverse is a deep, memorable experience, the pulses in particular guiding the music's more familiar freeform guitar timbres into areas that are less predictable." He added, "While it would also be interesting to hear this material as a studio project, treated, controlled and edited with a clinical precision, Transverse is an exceptionally immersive, expertly captured documentation of a tumultuous performance that has already earned a place in recent history." Philip Sherburne of Spin stated, "A magic carpet of woven steel, Transverse soars up and out, borne aloft on ghostly vocals and sheets of guitar noise." John Doran of The Quietus called it "one of the most exciting live albums to be released in many, many years."

=== Accolades ===
Year-end lists for Transverse
Publication	List	Rank	Ref.
BBC Music	BBC Music's Top 25 Albums of 2012	12	
Crack	The Top 100 Albums of 2012	62	
Fact	The 50 Best Albums of 2012	43	
MusicOMH	musicOMH's Top 100 Albums of 2012	9	
The Quietus	The Quietus Albums of the Year 2012	3	
Uncut	Uncut's Top 75 New Albums of 2012	75	
The Wire	Top 50: Albums of the Year 2012	9	

== Track listing ==
Transverse track listing
No.	Title	Length
1.	"V1"	10:04
2.	"V2"	10:05
3.	"V3"	9:05
4.	"V4"	10:07
5.	"V4 Studio (Slap 1)"	9:53
Total length:		49:18

Bandcamp edition additional track
No.	Title	Length
6.	"V4 Studio (Slap 2)"	5:41
Total length:		54:59

== Personnel ==
Credits adapted from liner notes.

- Chris Carter
- Cosey Fanni Tutti
- Nik Colk Void
