= Bilious Paths =

Studio album by μ-Ziq
- Released: 2 June 2003
- Genre: Drill 'n' bass, IDM
- Length: 52:32
- Label: Planet Mu
- Producer: Mike Paradinas

Μ-Ziq chronology
Royal Astronomy (1999)	Bilious Paths (2003)	Duntisbourne Abbots Soulmate Devastation Technique (2007)

Professional ratings
Review scores
Source	Rating
AllMusic	4/5 stars
CMJ New Music Report	favorable
Pitchfork	7.9/10
PopMatters	favorable
Prefix	6.0/10

Bilious Paths is the sixth studio album by the British IDM producer μ-Ziq, released on Planet Mu in 2003.

== Critical reception ==
John Bush of AllMusic gave the album 4 stars out of 5, writing, "Highlights abound, but this is definitely one for those used to the blend of heavy innovation and occasional inanity to be found on nearly every μ-Ziq record." Matt Gonzales of PopMatters wrote, "Bilious Paths is further proof that μ-Ziq is an indisputable giant in the IDM world, even if few people can see him."

== Track listing ==
No.	Title	Length
1.	"Johnny Mastricht"	4:12
2.	"Meinheld"	3:39
3.	"Siege of Antioch"	4:16
4.	"Octelcogopod"	4:48
5.	"On/Off"	3:44
6.	"Silk Ties"	4:25
7.	"Aec Merlin"	3:27
8.	"Grape Nut Beats (Pt. 1)"	5:21
9.	"Grape Nut Beats (Pt. 2)"	5:09
10.	"Mouse Bums"	4:30
11.	"Fall of Antioch"	2:04
12.	"My Mengegus"	6:57
