= Bluff Limbo =

Studio album by μ-Ziq
- Released: August 15, 1994
- Recorded: 1993
- Genre: Ambient techno, IDM
- Length: 90:02
- Label: Rephlex
- Producer: Mike Paradinas

Μ-Ziq chronology
Tango N' Vectif (1993)	Bluff Limbo (1994)	In Pine Effect (1995)

Bluff Limbo is the second album of British IDM Producer μ-Ziq and the follow-up to Tango N' Vectif.

== Reception ==
Professional ratings
Review scores
Source	Rating
Allmusic	3/5 stars

Bluff Limbo was placed at number 35 on the NME's list for best albums of 1994.

== Track listing ==
=== Disc one ===
1. "Hector's House" – 4:26
2. "Commemorative Pasta" – 4:37
3. "Gob Bots" – 4:50
4. "The Wheel" – 6:15
5. "27" – 1:18
6. "Metal Thing #3" – 5:51
7. "Twangle Frent" – 7:06
8. "Make It Funky" – 4:38
9. "Zombies" – 5:17

=== Disc two ===
1. "Riostand" – 6:18
2. "Organic Tomato Yoghurt" – 3:58
3. "Sick porter" – 5:15
4. "Sick Porter" – 7:38
5. "Dance #2" – 5:46
6. "Nettle + Pralines" – 6:29
7. "Ethereal Murmurings" – 10:20

== Personnel ==
- Mike Paradinas - Composer, producer
