= Tim Poston =

English mathematician (1945–2017)

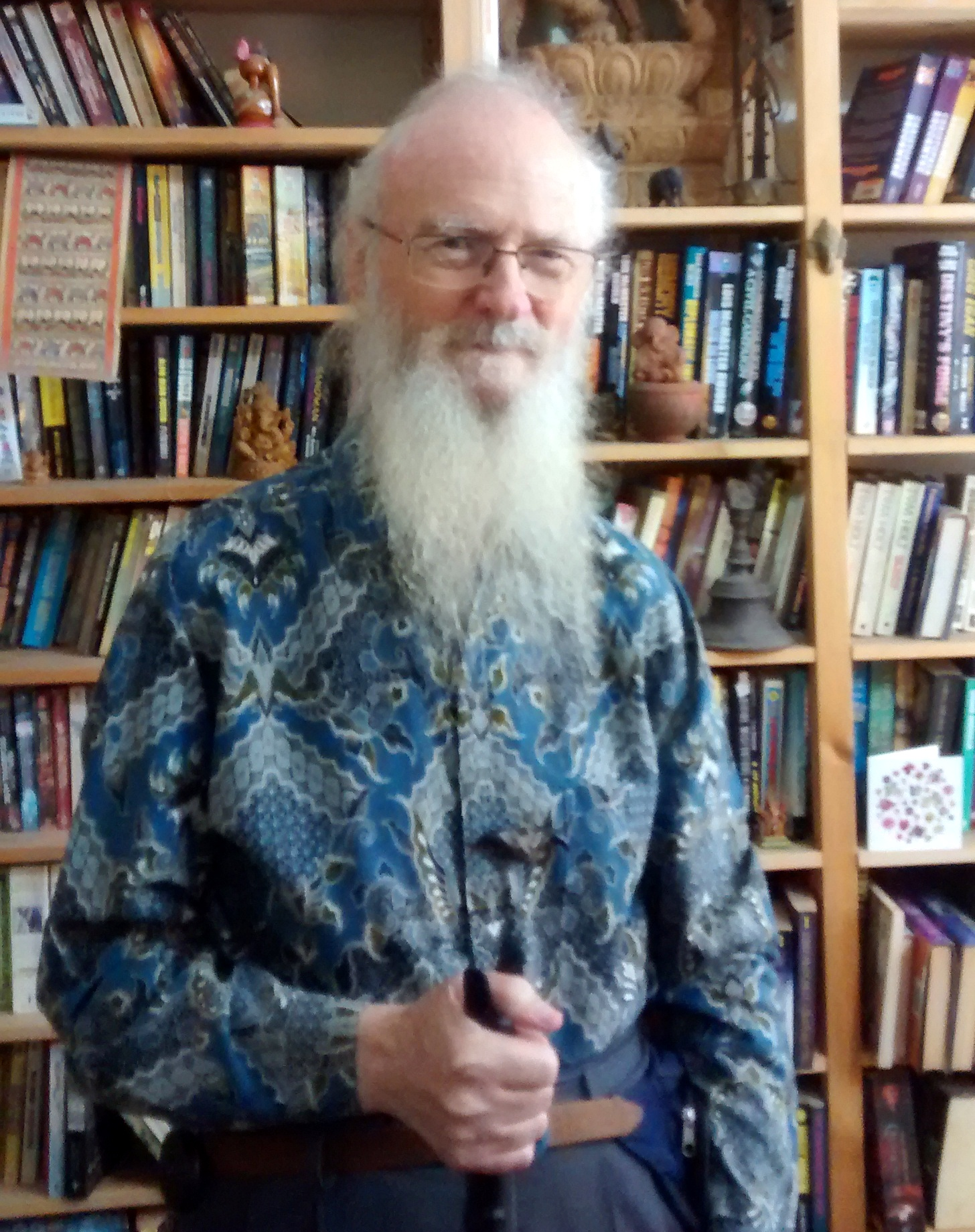
- Poston in 2016
- Born: 19 June 1945
- Died: 22 August 2017 (aged 72); Bangalore, India
- Education: University of Hull (BSc Special Honours); University of Warwick (PhD)
- Known for: Catastrophe theory, Topology
- Scientific career
- Fields: Mathematics
- Workplaces: National Institute of Advanced Studies; UCLA; University of California, Santa Cruz; Battelle Institute; National University of Singapore
- Academic advisors: Erik Christopher Zeeman, Roger Penrose
- Website: geometeer.com

Timothy Poston (19 June 1945 – 22 August 2017) was an English mathematician and polymath best known for his work on catastrophe theory.

His early childhood was in Moscow where his father served in the British Embassy for 18 months. When his father moved back to the UK to work for the BBC, Tim went to Datchworth primary school. Later his father ran The Near East Broadcasting Station Sharq al-Adna; his mother taught her children by PNEU until Tim went to The Junior School in Nicosia as a boarder. After the Suez débâcle, his father returned to the UK to train as a parson, and the family lived in Oxfordshire, Wiltshire and Dorset. Tim boarded at the Perse school to age 15 and then to Dauntsey's. From 1964 to 1967 he was an undergraduate at the University of Hull, obtaining a 1st Class BSc. (Special Honours) in Mathematics. In 1967-1969 he began graduate work at Hull, taking a sabbatical year as Student Union president. He then moved to the University of Warwick to take a PhD in mathematics.

His PhD thesis on " Fuzzy Geometry" was supervised by Christopher Zeeman and the PhD was awarded in 1972. This topic, otherwise known as "tolerance spaces", is similar to topology and should not be confused with fuzzy logic.

Tim specialized in geometry, graphics, algorithm design, human-computer interaction, medical imaging, patent writing and singularity theory. His books on catastrophe theory and on differential geometry and relativity are still in print after a third of a century.

His academic career was carried out in a series of research centres, including Rio de Janeiro, Rochester NY, Porto, Geneva, Stuttgart, Charleston SC, Santa Cruz CA, Los Angeles CA, Pohang, Singapore, and Bangalore. His academic publications include 70 papers in journals and conference proceedings and 4 research texts.

His research areas include catastrophe theory, the psychology of perception, vibrations of crystals, urban planning, settlement patterns in archaeology, 3D graphics, magnetic resonance imaging, interaction with documents and with virtual 3D objects, dynamic text rendering, and brain surgery planning. He has 18 patents issued, with another 12 in the pipeline.

From a very early age Tim discovered he not only liked to read science fiction, but loved writing down his own stories too. This ultimately led to the co-authoring of an SF novel The Living Labyrinth, published in 2016 by ReAnimus Press, and its sequel Rock Star in 2017.

Less well known is his role as active founding member of COUM Transmissions performance group with Genesis P-Orridge. They studied at Hull University together. Tim Poston wrote texts and advised COUM on physics and mathematics 1968–1978. Tim Poston remained "Scientific Adviser" to P-Orridge up until his death in 2017.

== Books ==
- Poston, Tim; Stewart, Ian (1978), Catastrophe Theory and its Applications, Pitman, ISBN 978-0-273-01029-6
- Tensor Geometry: The Geometric Viewpoint and its Uses with C.T. J. Dodson
- The Living Labyrinth: SF novel co-authored with Ian Stewart, ReAnimus Press 2016, ISBN 978-1535298421
- Rock Star: SF novel co-authored with Ian Stewart, ReAnimus Press 2017, ISBN 978-1548900373
