= Royal Astronomy =

Studio album by μ-Ziq
- Released: 26 July 1999
- Genre: Drill 'n' bass; IDM
- Length: 58:40
- Label: Hut; Astralwerks
- Producer: Mike Paradinas

Μ-Ziq chronology
Brace Yourself (1998)	Royal Astronomy (1999)	Bilious Paths (2003)

Singles from Royal Astronomy
- 1. "The Fear" Released: 12 July 1999

Royal Astronomy is the fifth studio album by English electronic music producer Mike Paradinas under the stage name μ-Ziq, released on 26 July 1999 by Hut Records and Astralwerks.

== Critical reception ==
Professional ratings
Review scores
Source	Rating
AllMusic	3/5 stars
Alternative Press	4/5
Entertainment Weekly	B+
The Guardian	4/5 stars
Muzik	3/5 stars
NME	7/10
Pitchfork	5.1/10
PopMatters	8.5/10
Q	4/5 stars
Spin	7/10

Jon Dolan of Spin described Royal Astronomy as Paradinas' "most ambitious work to date: a bold stab at classicism steeped in lush orchestrations that can be anything from sweetly elegiac to darkly bizarre—as if the embattled soul conducting the musicians is being torn between millennial nightmares and wistful visions of empires past." Sarah Zupko of PopMatters called it "the most advanced and adventurous work of his career."

NME named Royal Astronomy the 38th best album of 1999.

== Track listing ==
All tracks are written by Mike Paradinas.

No.	Title	Length
1.	"Scaling"	4:14
2.	"The Hwicci Song"	3:40
3.	"Autumn Acid"	3:42
4.	"Slice"	4:41
5.	"Carpet Muncher"	3:00
6.	"The Motorbike Track"	7:24
7.	"Mentim"	4:29
8.	"The Fear"	4:24
9.	"Gruber's Mandolin"	2:39
10.	"World of Leather"	4:22
11.	"Scrape"	1:42
12.	"56"	3:47
13.	"Burst Your Arm"	6:26
14.	"Goodbye, Goodbye"	4:11
Total length:		58:41

Japanese edition bonus tracks
No.	Title	Length
15.	"The Fear (Remixed)"	4:54
16.	"Morning Frolic"	4:13
Total length:		67:48

== Charts ==
Chart (1999)	Peak position
UK Albums (OCC)	185
