= Brace Yourself (EP) =

EP by μ-Ziq
- Released: 5 May 1998
- Genre: Drill n bass
- Length: 33:16
- Label: Planet Mu, Virgin Records

Μ-Ziq chronology
Lunatic Harness (1997)	Brace Yourself (1998)	Royal Astronomy (1999)

Professional ratings
Review scores
Source	Rating
AllMusic	2.5/5 stars

Brace Yourself is an EP by Mike Paradinas, released in 1998 under his main moniker μ-Ziq.

The title of the EP is derived from the track "Brace Yourself Jason" from μ-Ziq's earlier album, Lunatic Harness. It features two remixes of the title track itself, "Brace Yourself (Remix)" and "Brace Yourself (Reprise)".

== Track listing ==
All tracks are written by Mike Paradinas

No.	Title	Length
1.	"Brace Yourself (Remix)"	5:56
2.	"Kubba"	4:38
3.	"Vaken Bolt"	2:08
4.	"Losers March"	4:42
5.	"Summer Living"	4:03
6.	"Intellitag"	3:43
7.	"Abmoit"	4:48
8.	"Brace Yourself (Reprise)"	3:18
Total length:		33:16
