= Chemistry Lessons: Volume One =

Studio album by Chris Carter
- Released: March 30, 2018
- Genre: Electronic
- Length: 66:01
- Label: Mute

Chris Carter chronology
Transverse (2012)	Chemistry Lessons: Volume One (2018)

Professional ratings
Aggregate scores
Source	Rating
Metacritic	81/100
Review scores
Source	Rating
AllMusic	3.5/5 stars
Exclaim!	8/10
Loud and Quiet	8/10
Pitchfork	8/10
PopMatters	7/10
Resident Advisor	3.6/5

Chemistry Lessons: Volume One is a studio album by British electronic musician Chris Carter. It was released on 30 March 2018, by Mute Records.

== Release ==
On 9 January 2018, Carter announced the release of his first album in seventeen years, along with the first single "Blissters". Speaking on the release, Carter explained:

"If there’s an influence on the album, it’s definitely ‘60s radiophonic. Over the last few years I’ve also been listening to old English folk music, almost like a guilty pleasure, and so some tracks on the album hark back to an almost ingrained DNA we have for those kinds of melodies. They’re not dissimilar to nursery rhymes in some ways."

== Critical reception ==
Chemistry Lessons: Volume One was met with "universal acclaim" reviews from critics. At Metacritic, which assigns a weighted average rating out of 100 to reviews from mainstream publications, this release received an average score of 81 based on 11 reviews. Aggregator Album of the Year gave the release a 77 out of 100 based on a critical consensus of 5 reviews.

Paul Simpson of AllMusic explained the album was "created using a fusion of modular synthesizers, digital signal processing, drum machines, field recordings, and vocal manipulation." He also went on to say "the vocals on this album are androgynous, amorphous, and alien, and it's hard to tell if they're manipulated human voices or entirely synthetic." Kevin Press from Exclaim! gave the release an 8 out of 10, noting "the 67-minute album features 25 remarkably accessible tracks. Carter has also incorporated treated vocals he's field-recorded from a variety of sources. It adds real dimension to the album." John Doran of The Quietus wrote that many of the tracks "show an enviable talent for melodic writing" and recall Kraftwerk, Orbital and OMD.

=== Accolades ===
Accolades for Chemistry Lessons Volume One
Publication	Accolade	Rank
Bleep	Bleep's Top 10 Albums of 2018	5
Louder Than War	Louder Than War's Top 25 Albums of 2018	58
Mojo	Mojo's Top 75 Albums of 2018	43
The Quietus	The Quietus' Top 100 Albums of 2018	17

== Track listing ==
Chemistry Lessons track listing
No.	Title	Length
1.	"Blissters"	2:49
2.	"Tangerines"	2:00
3.	"Nineteen 7"	2:06
4.	"Cernubicua"	3:31
5.	"Pillars of Wah"	2:19
6.	"Modularity"	4:48
7.	"Field Depth"	2:39
8.	"Moon Two"	2:36
9.	"Durlin"	2:57
10.	"Corvus"	3:51
11.	"Tones Map"	2:14
12.	"Dust & Spiders"	1:40
13.	"Gradients"	1:46
14.	"Lab Test"	3:13
15.	"Shildreke"	3:04
16.	"Uysring"	2:02
17.	"Ghosting"	2:52
18.	"Noise Floor"	2:44
19.	"Post Industrial"	3:18
20.	"Rehndim"	2:20
21.	"Roane"	2:01
22.	"Time Curious Glows"	2:10
23.	"Ars Vetus"	2:58
24.	"Hobbs End"	2:05
25.	"Inkstain"	1:58

== Charts ==
Chart performance for Chemistry Lessons: Volume One
Chart (2018)	Peak position
Scottish Albums (Official Charts)	75
UK Independent Albums (Official Charts)	16
