= Mike Paradinas =

British musician

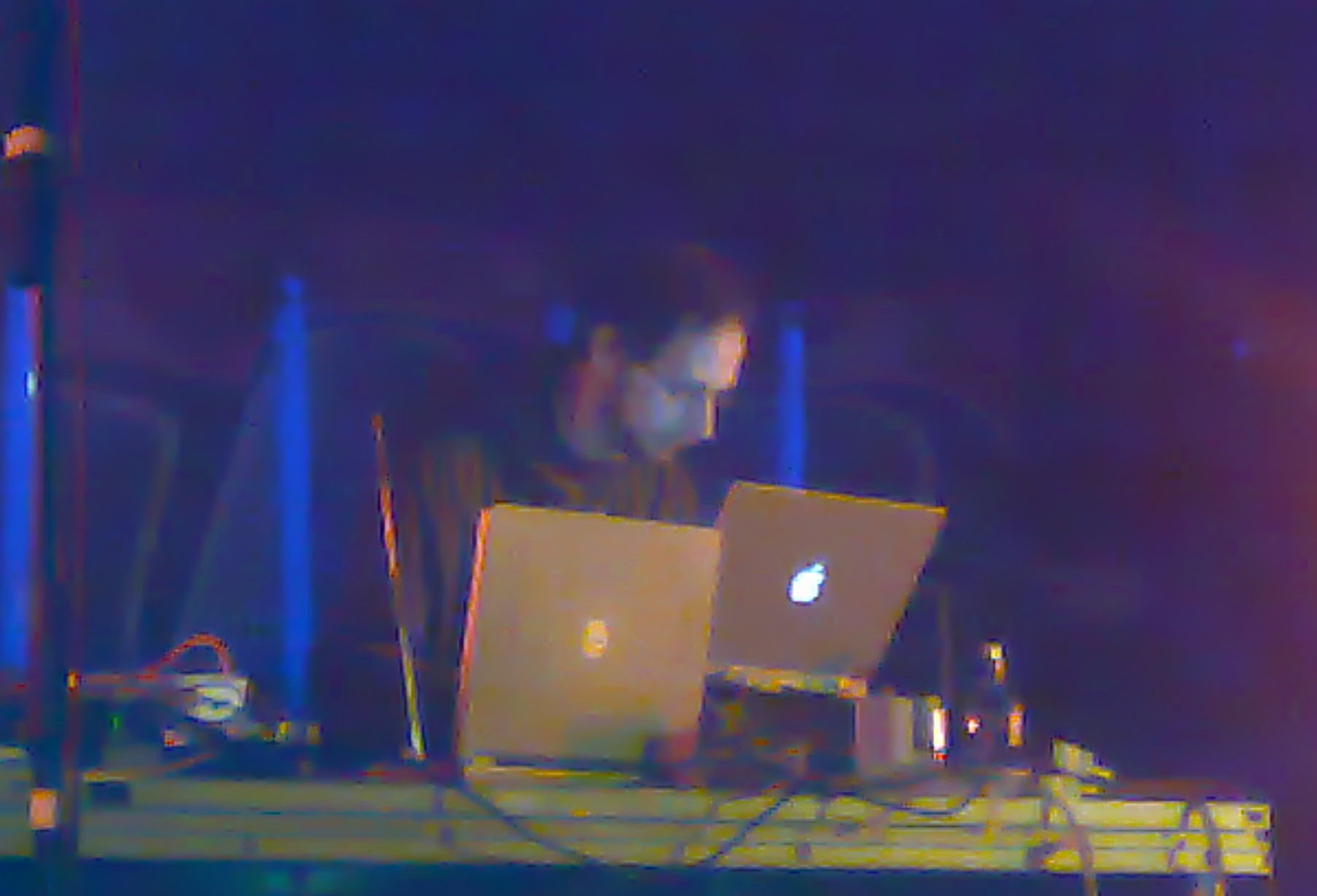
- Paradinas performing in 2007

Background information
- Also known as: μ-Ziq; Tusken Raiders; Kid Spatula; Rude Ass Tinker; Jake Slazenger; Gary Moscheles; Frost Jockey
- Born: Michael Robert Paradinas; 26 September 1971 (age 55); Wimbledon, London, England
- Genres: Electronic; techno; IDM; drill 'n' bass
- Occupations: Label owner; musician
- Years active: Late 1980s–present
- Labels: Rephlex; Astralwerks; Planet Mu; Virgin
- Website: planet.mu

Michael Robert Paradinas (born 26 September 1971), better known by his stage name μ-Ziq (pronounced "music" or mu-zik), is an English electronic musician from Wimbledon, London. He was associated with the electronic style intelligent dance music (IDM) during the 1990s, and recorded on Rephlex Records and Reflective Records. His critically acclaimed 1997 album, Lunatic Harness, helped define the drill 'n' bass subgenre and was also his most successful release, selling over 100,000 copies. Paradinas founded the record label Planet Mu in 1995, through which he has championed genres such as juke, IDM and footwork.

== History ==
Paradinas was born in Charing Cross Hospital and began playing keyboards during the early 1980s, and listened to new wave music such as OMD, Heaven 17 and early Human League. He joined a few bands in the mid-1980s, then spent years on keyboards for the group Short Circuit, before changing their name to Blue Innocence.

During this period, Paradinas had been recording on his own as well with synthesizers and a four-track recorder. In 1995, following a performance at The Orange in London, Blue Innocence broke up. In the meantime, The bass player, Francis Naughton, had an Atari ST Cubeat based MIDI setup that he was using to create electronic music. He introduced Paradinas to the sequencer, and they started to create some new tracks together. After the material was played for Mark Pritchard and Tom Middleton—the duo behind Global Communication and the heads of Evolution Records—it was to be released; however, recording commitments later forced Pritchard and Middleton to withdraw their agreement. Fortunately for Paradinas, Richard D. James (a.k.a. Aphex Twin) had also heard the tracks and agreed to release their music on Rephlex Records under the alias μ-Ziq.

Naughton then left μ-Ziq to start Rocket Goldstar. A second album, Bluff Limbo, was scheduled to be released in mid-1994, though only 1,000 copies were published. It was re-issued by Rephlex in 1996 after Paradinas served papers on the label. Paradinas's first major-label release came later in 1994, after he undertook a remix project for Virgin Records: the remix EP The Auteurs Vs μ-Ziq for the britpop band the Auteurs. The remixes Paradinas offered sounded nothing like the original song, a familiar practice for many experimental electronic musicians in those times.

Even though the EP was hardly a sales success, Virgin signed up Paradinas and gave him his own sublabel, Planet Mu, to release his own work and to develop similar-minded artists. (Paradinas later broke with Virgin and in 1998 established Planet Mu as his own independent label.) Written into his own contract was a provision for unlimited recording under different names, and during 1995 Paradinas unveiled three aliases and released many albums within less than a year. The neo-electro music label Clear released his debut single under the alias Tusken Raiders (named after the Star Wars species) early in the year. Clear Records also released the first Paradinas alias album, Jake Slazenger MakesARacket, later in 1995. Although they were still audible, the LP ignored the electro influences in favour of some synthesizer figures and the previously unheard influence of jazz-funk. Paradinas continued to release solo albums under the aforementioned names as well as Gary Moscheles, and a one-time collaboration with Aphex Twin under the Mike & Rich moniker.

In 1997, Paradinas made a style change again, mixing experimental electronic music with drum'n'bass, a similar aesthetic path taken by Squarepusher and Aphex Twin. During this year he was also touring with popular musician Björk. Björk inspired the 1999 μ-Ziq album Royal Astronomy, with its mixture of unusual vocals, strings and breakbeat. All of his albums until 2003 were released in the US on the more mainstream label, Astralwerks.

Under the pseudonym μ-Ziq, Paradinas also released Challenge Me Foolish (2018), Magic Pony Ride (2022), 1977 (2023), and Grush (2024).

== Personal life ==
Paradinas is married to fellow musician Lara Rix-Martin (also performs as Meemo Comma), with whom he has produced music under the alias Heterotic.

== Discography ==
=== As μ-Ziq ===
==== Studio albums ====
Title	Details
Tango n' Vectif	Released: 21 November 1993; Label: Rephlex
Bluff Limbo	Released: 15 August 1994; Label: Rephlex
In Pine Effect	Released: 31 October 1995; Label: Hi-Rise, Astralwerks
Lunatic Harness	Released: 30 June 1997; Label: Planet Mu, Astralwerks
Royal Astronomy	Released: 26 July 1999; Label: Hut, Astralwerks
Bilious Paths	Released: 2 June 2003; Label: Planet Mu
Duntisbourne Abbots Soulmate Devastation Technique	Released: 20 August 2007; Label: Planet Mu
Somerset Avenue Tracks (1992–1995)	Released: 25 February 2013; Label: Planet Mu
Chewed Corners	Released: 24 June 2013; Label: Planet Mu
Aberystwyth Marine	Released: 4 February 2016; Label: Planet Mu
RY30 Trax	Released: 13 May 2016; Label: Planet Mu
Challenge Me Foolish	Released: 13 April 2018; Label: Planet Mu
Scurlage	Released: 28 May 2021; Label: Analogical Force
Magic Pony Ride	Released: 10 June 2022; Label: Planet Mu
1977	Released: 7 April 2023; Label: Balmat
Grush	Released: 14 June 2024; Label: Planet Mu
1979	Released: 31 October 2025; Label: Balmat
Manzana	Released: 7 November 2025; Label: Balmat

==== EPs ====
- The Auteurs vs μ-Ziq (1994)
- Salsa with Mesquite (1995)
- Urmur Bile Trax, Vols. 1 & 2 (1997)
- Brace Yourself (1998)
- XTEP (2013)
- Rediffusion (2014)
- Pthagonal EP (2017)
- D Funk EP (2018)
- Hello (2022)
- Galope (2023)

==== Singles ====
- "Phi*1700 (U/V)" (1994)
- "My Little Beautiful" (1997)
- "The Fear" (1999)
- "Ease Up" (2005)
- "Goodbye" / "Goodbye Remixes" (2022)

==== Compilations ====
- XTLP (2015)
- Furthur Electronix Trax (2022)

==== Promotional releases ====
- "The Hwicci Song" (1999)
- Rediffusion Mixtape (2013)
- Mix for Bleep (2023)
- Extra Grush (2024)

=== As Tusken Raiders / Rude Ass Tinker ===
- Bantha Trax (1995)
- Bantha Trax, Vol. 2 (1999)
- "The Motorbike Track" (1999)
- "Imperial Break" (2001)
- Inchstar Static EP (2018)
- Bantha Trax, Vol. 3 (2020)
- Housewerk EP Series, Vols. 1–6 (2021)
- Boundary Road (2021)
- "Piano Track" (2022)
- Bantha Trax, Vol. 4 (2022)
- Housewerk, Vol. 7 (2022)
- Bantha Trax, Vol. 5 (2023)
- Housewerk, Vol. 8 (2025)

=== As Jake Slazenger ===
- Makesaracket (1995)
- "Megaphonk" (1995)
- "Nautilus" (1996)
- Das ist ein Groovybeat, ja (1996)
- "Pewter Dragon" (2006)
- Drops a Deuce (2020)
- Ace in the Hole (2020)

=== As Kid Spatula ===
- Spatula Freak (1995)
- Full Sunken Breaks (2000)
- Meast (2004)
- Joozy (2025)

=== As Gary Moscheles ===
- Shaped to Make Your Life Easier (1996)

=== As Frost Jockey ===
- Burgundy Trax, Vol. 1 (2000)
- Burgundy Trax, Vol. 2 (2000)

=== Collaborations ===
==== Diesel M (with Marco Jerrentrup) ====
- "M for Multiple" (1993)

==== Mike & Rich (with Richard D. James a.k.a. Aphex Twin) ====
- Expert Knob Twiddlers (1996)

==== Slag Boom Van Loon (with Jochem Paap a.k.a. Speedy J) ====
- Slag Boom Van Loon (1998)
- So Soon (2001)

==== Heterotic (with Lara Rix-Martin) ====
- Love & Devotion (2013)
- "Rain" (2014)
- Weird Drift (2014)

==== (with Mrs Jynx) ====
- Secret Garden (2021)
