= COUM Transmissions =

British music and performance art collective

COUM Transmissions /kuːm/ was a music and performance art collective who operated in the United Kingdom from 1969 through to 1976. The collective was influenced by the Dada and surrealism artistic movements, the writers of the Beat Generation, and underground music. COUM were openly confrontational and subversive, challenging aspects of conventional British society. Founded in Hull, Yorkshire, by Genesis P-Orridge, other prominent early members included Cosey Fanni Tutti and Spydeee Gasmantell (also at school with Genesis P-Orridge). Part-time members included Tim Poston, Brook Menzies, Haydn Robb, Les (Reverend Lelli) Maull, Ray Harvey, John (Jonji) Smith, Foxtrot Echo, Fizzy Paet, and John Gunni Busck (John Lacey). Late-joining member Peter "Sleazy" Christopherson, together with P-Orridge and Tutti went on to found the pioneering industrial band Throbbing Gristle in 1976.

COUM Transmissions logo

COUM (an acronym of Cosmic Organicism of the Universal Molecular) had a rotating membership, and included both intellectual and criminal elements and existed formally from 1969 until 1976. In that year, P-Orridge and Tutti exhibited at London's Institute of Contemporary Arts in a show called Prostitution, which consisted of explicit photographs of lesbians, assemblages of rusty knives, syringes, bloodied hair, used sanitary towels, press clippings, and photo documentation of COUM performances in Milan and Paris. There was a lot of outrage expressed by London newspapers and UK politicians, including Tory MP Nicholas Fairbairn, who referred to COUM as the "wreckers of Western civilization". However, memberships to the ICA increased sharply as a result of the COUM show.

The last official COUM performances and art shows took place in 1976. Around that time, P-Orridge proclaimed to be through with performance art. Tutti, on the other hand, felt she had only just begun. Though she feels the name COUM to be "tainted" now and unusable, she has been known to say her individual projects are still a part of the COUM family of work. For a while, she operated a website at COUM.co.uk.

== Foundation: 1968–1970 ==
The founder of COUM Transmissions was Genesis P-Orridge (1950–2020), a Mancunian by birth who later founded Throbbing Gristle and other projects. A university student who had developed a great interest in the radical counter-culture, P-Orridge had dropped out of his studies at the University of Hull and spent three months living in the Transmedia Explorations commune in North London during late 1968. The commune members adhered to a strict regimen with the intention of deconditioning its members out of their routines and conventional behaviour; they were forbidden from sleeping in the same place on consecutive nights, food was cooked at irregular times of the day and all clothing was kept in a communal chest, with its members wearing something different on each day. P-Orridge stayed there for three months, until late October 1969, after deciding to leave, due to being angered that the commune's leaders were given more rights than the other members, and believed that the group lacked an interest in music. After hitch-hiking across the country, Genesis P-Orridge settled down in their parents' new home in Shrewsbury, and volunteered as an office clerk in their father's new business.

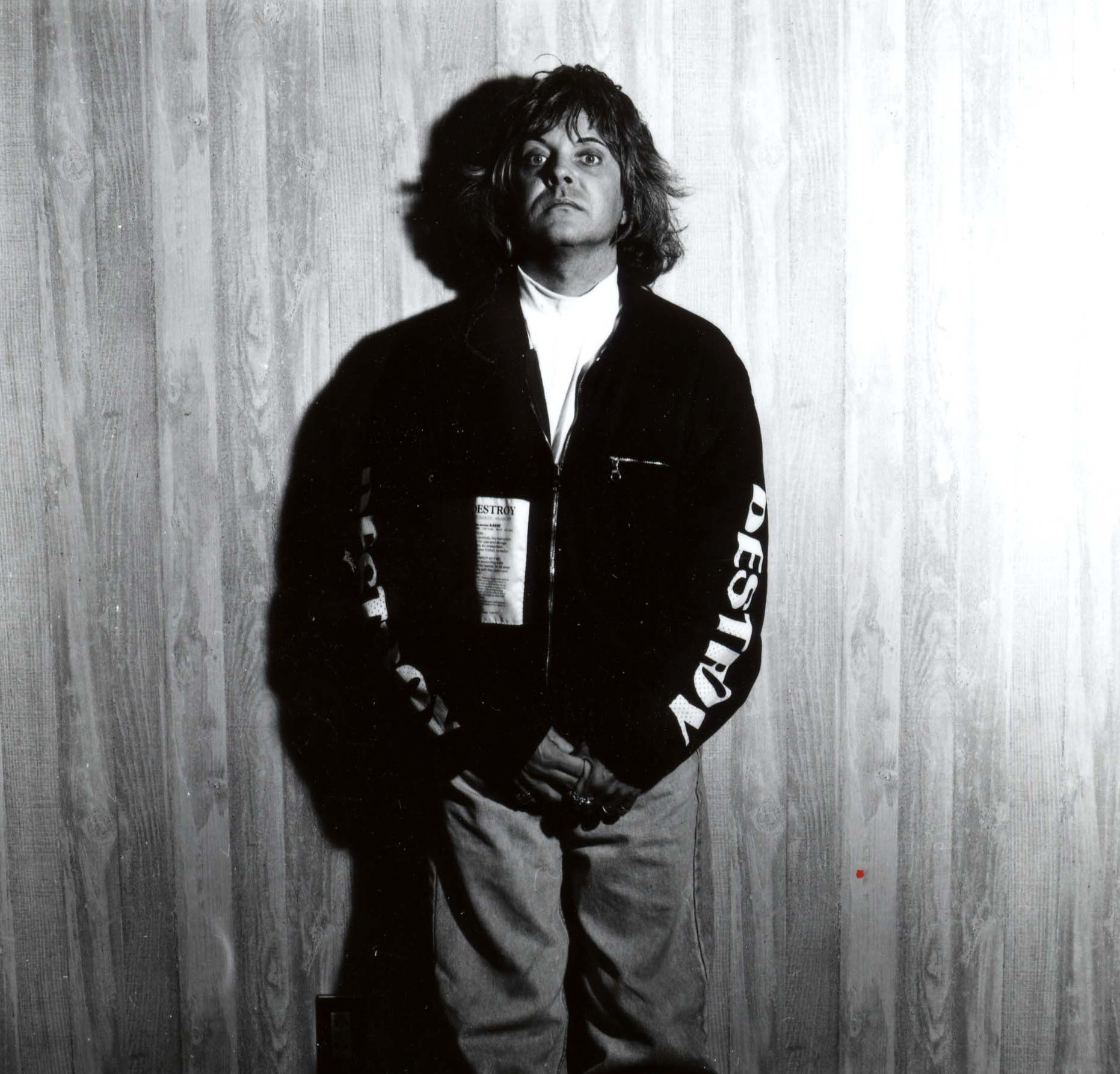
Genesis P-Orridge, the founder of COUM Transmissions, in Japan during the 1980s or 1990s.

P-Orridge first developed the concept for COUM on a family trip to Wales, while sitting in the back of the car; P-Orridge became "disembodied and heard voices and saw the COUM symbol and heard the words 'COUM Transmissions'." Returning home that evening, P-Orridge filled three notebooks with various artistic thoughts and ideas, influenced in part by time spent with Transmedia Explorations. In December 1969, P-Orridge returned to Hull to meet up with friend John Shapeero, with whom P-Orridge would turn COUM Transmissions into an avant-garde artistic and musical troupe. They initially debated as to how to define "COUM", later deciding that like the name dada it should remain open to interpretation. P-Orridge designed a logo for the group, consisting of a semi-erect penis formed out of the word COUM with a drip of semen coming out of the end, while the motto "YOUR LOCAL DIRTY BANNED" was emblazoned underneath. Another logo designed by Megson consisted of a hand-drawn seal accompanied by the statement "COUM guarantee disappointment"; from their early foundation, the group made use of wordplay in their artworks and adverts.

COUM's earliest public events were impromptu musical gigs performed at various pubs around Hull; titles for these events included Thee Fabulous Mutations, Space Between the Violins, Dead Violins and Degradation and Clockwork Hot Spoiled Acid Test. The latter combined the names of Anthony Burgess' dystopian science-fiction novel A Clockwork Orange (1962) with Tom Wolfe's The Electric Kool-Aid Acid Test (1968), a work of literary journalism devoted to the Merry Pranksters, a U.S. communal counter-cultural group who advocated the use of psychedelic drugs. COUM's music was anarchic and improvised, making use of such instruments as broken violins, prepared pianos, guitars, bongos and talking drums. As time went on, they would add further theatrics to their performances, in one instance making the audience crawl through a polythene tunnel in order to enter the venue.

In December 1969, P-Orridge and Shapeero moved out of their flat and into a former fruit warehouse in Hull's dockland area, overlooking the Humber. Named the Ho-Ho Funhouse by P-Orridge, the warehouse became the communal home to an assortment of counter-cultural figures, including artists, musicians, fashion designers and underground magazine producers. At Christmas 1969, Christine Newby moved into the Funhouse after being thrown out of her home by her father. Having earlier befriended P-Orridge at an acid test party, Newby would move into his room at the Funhouse, adopting the pseudonym Cosey Fanni Tutti after the title of Amadeus Mozart's 1790 opera Così fan tutte. Joining COUM, Tutti initially helped in building props and designing costumes, and was there when the group began changing its focus from music to performance art and more theatrical happenings; one of these involved the group turning up to play a gig but intentionally not bringing any instruments, something P-Orridge considered "much more theatrical, farcical and light-hearted" than their earlier performances.

== Notoriety in Hull: 1971–1973 ==
"Yes COUM are fab and kinky" (1971), an example of the artwork which P-Orridge produced to advertise the artistic-musical group; the primary image is of himself as a child. Underneath L to R Tim Poston, Spydeee Gasmantell, Genesis, Haydn Robb, John Smith, Menzies.

On 5 January 1971, by now living at 8 Prince Street Hull, Megson officially changed his name to Genesis P-Orridge by deed poll, combining his adopted nickname of "Genesis" with a misspelling of "porridge", the foodstuff which he lived off as a student. His new nom-de-guerre was intentionally un-glamorous, and he hoped that by adopting it he would trigger his own "genius factor". This caught the attention of the Yorkshire Post, who featured an article on COUM Transmissions on 11 February. Soon, COUM began to attract further media attention from newspapers across the country. On 18 April 1971, COUM, consisting of Genesis P'Orridge & Spydeee Gasmantell broadcast their first live radio session, for the On Cue programme for Radio Humberside and were interviewed by Jim Hawkins. As well as their radio and press exposure, they performed a variety of other happenings, such as Riot Control at the Gondola Club and then their first street action, Absolute Everywhere, which got them in trouble with the local police force.

The Gondola Club was raided by the police and closed down soon after; most other local clubs blamed COUM and unofficially banned them from performing in the Hull area. COUM drew up a petition which they distributed locally to gain support for the group and as a result, the group got a booking at the local Brickhouse, which was their first performance in which the audience applauded and called for an encore. However, the petition had contained their phallic logo, and the police charged P-Orridge and fellow COUM member Haydn Robb (now known as Haydn Nobb) of publishing an obscene advert, although the charges were later dropped. Gaining coverage in the music press, interest in the band grew, and they were asked to support the rock band Hawkwind at St. George's Hall in Bradford in October 1971, where they performed a piece called Edna and the Great Surfers, where they led the crowd in shouting "Off, Off, Off". The following month, the band attracted the interest of John Peel, who discussed the band in Disco and Music Echo, remarking that "[s]ome might say that Coum were madmen but constant exposure to mankind forces me to believe that we need more madmen like them." They also featured in an article in Torch, the publication of the University of Hull's student union, entitled "God Sucks Mary's Hairy Nipple"; a title from a message received during a seance in Solihull attended by P'Orridge, Gasmantell and others in 1967. The author of the article, Haydn Robb, would subsequently join the performance collective. Tim Poston (1945–2017), subsequently a lecturer in mathematics at Warwick University went on to undertake research into catastrophe theory, influenced, it is claimed by Genesis P'Orridge, by his work in COUM.

COUM released one song produced in this early period, "Dry Blood Tampax", on their 1983 cassette 23 Drifts to Guestling. They recognised that they would never become a commercial success and so sought out other forms of funding, successfully applying for a small Experimental Arts Grant from the Yorkshire Arts Association, a publicly funded body. Now openly describing themselves as performance artists, COUM looked up to the work of the Dadaists and emphasised the amateur quality of their work, proclaiming that "[t]he future of music lies in non-musicians", and strongly contrasting themselves with the classically trained figures involved in progressive rock which had attained mainstream popularity in Britain at the time. P-Orridge began to take an increasing interest in infantilism, founding a fictitious school of art, the L'ecole de l'art infantile, whose work culminated in a 1983 event known as the Baby's Coumpetition held at Oxford University's May Festival, which he had co-organised with Robin Klassnik and Opal L. Nations. Another invention of P-Orridge's at this time was his Ministry of Antisocial Insecurity (MAI), a parody of the governmental Ministry of Social Security. He also set about working on creating a character known as Alien Brain, and in July 1972 performed the World Premiere of The Alien Brain at Hull Arts Centre, a multi-media happening that involved the audience and which had received funding from the Yorkshire Arts Association. That summer, they also entered the National Rock/Folk Contest at the New Grange Club in Hull with a set entitled This Machine Kills Music; a parody of the slogan "this machine kills fascists".

They also put together their first book for publication; the first volume in a projected project known as The Million and One Names of COUM appeared in 1972, containing 1001 slogans, such as "COUM are Fab and Kinky" and "A thousand and one ways to COUM.". This was based on the science fiction short story The Nine Billion Names of God written by Arthur C. Clarke in 1953 Another of P-Orridge's early publications was the book Copyright Breeches (1973), which explored his ongoing fascination with the copyright symbol and its wider implications for art and society. COUM organised events for Hull City Council's Fanfare for Europe to commemorate the UK's joining the European Economic Community in 1973, while that year P-Orridge featured a piece of conceptual art, 'Wagon Train', at the Ferens Art Gallery's Winter Show, proving controversial in local press.

== Move to London: 1973–1976 ==
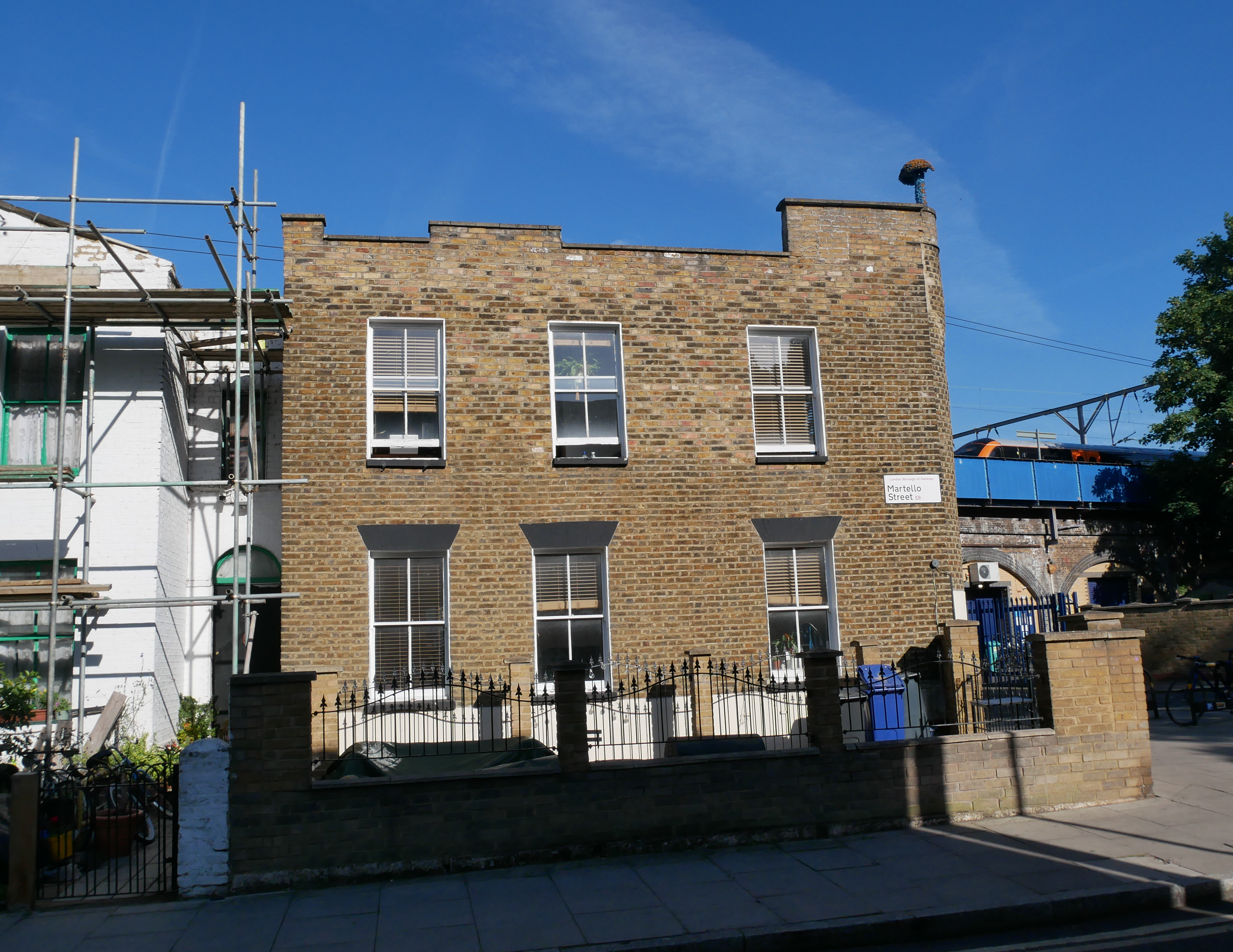
The building of 10 Martello Street, London, where COUM established their studio in 1973.

Following continual police harassment, P-Orridge and Tutti relocated to London, moving in to a squat and obtaining a basement studio in Hackney which they named the "Death Factory". After a brief correspondence, here P-Orridge met American novelist and poet William S. Burroughs (1914–1997), who later introduced him to the English/Canadian poet and artist Brion Gysin (1916–1986). Gysin would become a major influence upon P-Orridge's ideas and works and was his primary tutor in magic. 1973 saw COUM take part in the Fluxshoe retrospective that toured Britain exhibiting the work of the Fluxus artists; it was organised by David Mayor, who befriended P-Orridge. At that year's Edinburgh Festival, they undertook their Marcel Duchamp-inspired Art Vandals piece at the Richard Demarco Gallery, in which they engaged guests in unconventional conversation, and spilled their food and drink on the floor. Exhibiting alongside the Viennese Actionists, they came under increasing influence from these Austrian performance artists, adopting their emphasis on using shock tactics to combat conventional morality. September 1973 saw them produce their first film, Wundatrek Tours, which documented a day out to Brighton, while throughout the year they sent postcards that they had designed to mail-art shows across the world.

"COUM enable all kinds of people to discover their abilities to express ideas through different media. COUM believe that you don't NEED special training to produce and/or enjoy, worthwhile, significant and unique works. COUM demonstrate that there are NO boundaries in any form. It has NOT all been done before, and that which has can still bear valid re-interpretation. Thee [sic] possibilities remain endless."

— COUM Manifesto, 1974.

In January 1974, COUM decided to refocus their attention on music, doing so in a collaboration with the Canadian artist Clive Robertson; their co-created piece was titled Marcel Duchamp's Next Work. It premiered on 24 January 1974 at the Fourth International Festival of Electronic Music and Mixed Media at the Zwaarte Zaal in Ghent, Belgium, and had its second performance at Brussels' Palais des Beaux-Arts. The piece entailed bringing together twelve replicas of Marcel Duchamp's 1913 sculpture Bicycle Wheel, assembled in a circle, which were then played as musical instruments while either P-Orridge or Robertson conducted the piece. COUM's next major work was Couming of Age, performed in March 1974 at the Oval House in Kennington, South London; it represented the most conventional theatrical performance of their career. After the show, they were approached by an audience member, Peter Christopherson, who shared many of their interests; P-Orridge and Tutti nicknamed him "Sleazy" because of his particular interest in the sexual aspects of COUM's work. He began to aid them using his skills as a photographer and graphic designer, and would first perform with them in their March 1975 work Couming of Youth. In May 1974, COUM issued a manifesto published on an A3 double-sided sheet titled Decoumpositions and Events.

In April 1974 the Arts Council of Great Britain gave COUM the first half of a £1,500 grant, which was largely used to pay off the groups' £300 debt. The money stabilised the group, which now included P-Orridge and Tutti as directors, John Gunni Busck as technical director, and Lelli Maull as musical director. During that year, they made use of various artist-run venues in London, most notably the Art Meeting Place (AMP) in Covent Garden, where they regularly performed during 1974; these actions included Orange and Blue, Gainsborough's Blue Movie Boy, 4 Hours Music Action, Signals, and Throbbing Gristle. A number of these works entailed P-Orridge and Tutti exploring the gender balance, including concepts of gender confusion; P-Orridge for instance dressed in female clothing to adopt the persona of 'Crystal P-Orridge' on one occasion. In another piece performed at the AWB, which was titled Filth, P-Orridge and Tutti performed sexual acts using a double-ended dildo while on a bed.

COUM were frustrated with the restrictions imposed on them by the Arts Council as a prerequisite for receiving funding; the Council insisted that they perform in at least eight specifically-chosen venues a year, although COUM felt that this meant performing to the same audiences repeatedly and wished to perform at a wide range of other locations, such as in fields and on streets. In August 1974 they carried out a spontaneous unauthorised piece of performance art in Brook Green, Hammersmith. Titled Airborn Spells, Landborn Smells, it entailed the group members pretending to be dogs and pushing along a pram containing chicken's heads and bloodied tampons; during the performance, police arrived and put a stop to the event, deeming it to be obscene. In September 1974, COUM were invited to attend the Stadfest in Rottweil, West Germany, and they proceeded with a travel grant from the British Council. Their first performance there was titled Schlimm, which involved P-Orridge and Tutti performing anarchic actions in the street using a range of props. The next day, they followed this with a second street action, All that Glitters is not Kunst, which earned them praise from Bridget Riley and Ernst Jandl, both of whom were present. The acclaim that COUM received at Rottweil established the group's reputation as "one of the most innovative performance art groups then on the London art scene", convincing the Arts Council and British Council to take them more seriously and offer them greater support.

In February 1975, P-Orridge gained his only full-time job, working as an assistant editor for Colin Naylor at St. James' Press, in which he helped to compile the Contemporary Artists reference book. The work meant that he had less time to devote to COUM but gained a wide range of contacts in the art world. During that year, COUM embarked on a series of five performance pieces which it termed Omissions; these were performed across Europe, including at the Europa-Tag in Gross Gerau and the Kulturamt in Kiel. In March 1975, COUM performed Couming of Youth at the Melkweg in Theater Zaal, Amsterdam. Adopting a more violent stance than their previous work – in this reflecting an influence from the Viennese Actionists – the performance involved self-mutilation, Cosey inserting lighted candles into her vagina, P-Orridge being crucified and whipped, and P-Orridge and Cosey having sexual intercourse. At Southampton's Nuffield Festival in July 1975, COUM performed Studio of Lust, where P-Orridge publicly masturbated and all of the members undressed and adopted sexual poses.

== Chris Carter and the establishment of Throbbing Gristle: 1975– ==
"When we shifted from Coum Transmissions to TG, we were also stating that we wanted to go into popular culture, away from the art gallery context, and show that the same technique that had been made to operate in that system could work. We wanted to test it out in the real world, or nearer to the real world, at a more street level – with young kids who had no education in art perception, who didn't come along and either empathised or didn't; either liked the noise or didn't. A little mini-Dada movement, eh?"

— P-Orridge, 1983.

COUM were introduced to Chris Carter in the summer of 1975 through their mutual friend John Lacey. Lacey believed that Carter would be interested in COUM as a result of his particular interest in the experimental use of light and sound. Together, Carter, Christopherson, Cosey and P-Orridge founded a musical band, Throbbing Gristle, on 3 September 1975; they had deliberately chosen that date for it was the 36th anniversary of the United Kingdom joining the Second World War. The term "throbbing gristle" was deliberately chosen for it was a Yorkshire slang term for an erect penis. Throbbing Gristle, or TG as it was widely known, was aimed at a wider audience than COUM, thereby aiming to work within popular culture rather than the elite realm of the art scene. COUM and TG were largely treated as distinct entities; the music press ignored COUM and saw TG as experimental art rock, while the arts press ignored TG, viewing COUM as performance artists. Despite their intention of operating within the realms of popular culture, TG never had chart success, and remained a cult band; their audience was however far larger than COUM.

COUM continued to operate alongside TG, and in October 1975 they performed Jusquà la balle crystal'' at the Ninth Paris Biennale at the Musée d'art modern. The prestige of being invited to such an event led to the Arts Council awarding them a grant for £1,600, although only the first half of this was ever paid out. COUM's mail art had taken on an increasingly pornographic dimension, and in November 1975 the police charged P-Orridge with distributing obscene material via in the postal system under the 1953 Post Office Act; this trial was set for February 1976.

== The Prostitution show: 1976 ==
Their Prostitution show, in 1976 at the Institute of Contemporary Arts (ICA) in London, exhibited Tutti's pornographic images from magazines as well as erotic nude photographs. The show featured a stripper, used Tampax in glass, and transvestite guards. Prostitutes, punks, and people in costumes were among those hired to mingle with the gallery audience. The show caused debate in Parliament about the public funding of such events. In the House of Commons, Scottish Conservative MP Sir Nicholas Fairbairn demanded an explanation from Arts Minister Harold Lever and proclaimed P-Orridge and Tutti as "wreckers of civilisation". Fleet Street was not slow to pick up the story. The reviews were cut up, framed and put on display for the remainder of the exhibition. This was also reported in newspapers, so cut-ups about the cut-ups were also put on display.

Toward the end of COUM, performances would often consist of only P-Orridge, Cosey and Sleazy, the core group who went on to form Throbbing Gristle.

COUM ended when, at a performance in Antwerp, P-Orridge had ingested leaves, bark, and whiskey and started cutting their skin with nails and became sick and had to be taken to the hospital. They decided to "stop doing performance art."

== Discography ==
In July 2009, American record label Dais Records released archival vinyl LP releases by COUM Transmissions entitled The Sound Of Porridge Bubbling (2009), Sugarmorphoses (2011) and Home Aged & The 18 Month Hope (2013) in a limited edition of 500, as was the case with Early Worm (Genesis P-Orridge, Spydeee Gasmantell, Pingle Wad, and Ron Megson (the father of Genesis P-Orridge), 1968) in 2008.

The COUM Transmissions The Sound of Porridge Bubbling LP was recorded in 1971 featuring Genesis P-Orridge, Spydeee Gasmantell, Ray Harvey, Cosey Fanni Tutti and others. What musical content the LP features is improvisational and avant-garde in nature, and for the most part the album's tracks consist of spoken word material and sound experiments, at times reminiscent of the audio material that William S. Burroughs and Brion Gysin had been experimenting with in the 1960s. One track, Nude Supper is a direct reading by Spydeee Gasmantell from William S. Burroughs' work, Naked Lunch. The online version of this album has subsequently been amended so that the track titled 'Nude Supper' now refers to the track 'Sound of Porridge Bubbling', the track 'Sound of Porridge Bubbling' is a taped version of The Stripper. The original spoken word version of the reading from Naked Lunch is only found on the original 500 vinyl copies of the album.

== Legacy ==
Other, Like Me: The Oral History of COUM Transmissions and Throbbing Gristle, a documentary on both projects consisting of archival footage and photos and interviews with their members, was co-produced by BBC Television and aired on BBC Four in December 2021.
