= In Pine Effect =

Studio album by μ-Ziq
- Released: 31 October 1995
- Genre: IDM
- Length: 78:24 (CD); 96:59 (vinyl)
- Label: Hi-Rise
- Producer: Mike Paradinas

Μ-Ziq chronology
Bluff Limbo (1994)	In Pine Effect (1995)	Lunatic Harness (1997)

Professional ratings
Review scores
Source	Rating
AllMusic	4/5 stars
Muzik	4.5/5
Spin	6/10
The Village Voice	A−

In Pine Effect is the third studio album by English electronic music producer Mike Paradinas under the stage name μ-Ziq. It was released on 31 October 1995 by Hi-Rise Recordings in the United Kingdom, and later by Astralwerks in the United States.

== Track listing ==
All tracks are written by Mike Paradinas

UK CD edition
No.	Title	Length
1.	"Roy Castle"	6:41
2.	"Within a Sound"	6:05
3.	"The Wailing Song" (omitted from US CD edition)	7:01
4.	"Old Fun #1"	7:05
5.	"Dauphine"	6:37
6.	"Funky Pipecleaner"	6:49
7.	"Iced Jem"	6:04
8.	"Phiesope"	6:04
9.	"Mr. Angry"	5:36
10.	"Melancho"	5:21
11.	"Pine Effect"	4:52
12.	"Problematic"	6:12
13.	"Green Crumble"	3:57
Total length:		78:24

UK vinyl edition
No.	Title	Length
1.	"Mr. Angry"	5:36
2.	"Melancho"	5:21
3.	"The Wailing Song"	7:01
4.	"Iced Jem"	6:04
5.	"Funky Pipecleaner"	6:49
6.	"Phiesope"	6:04
7.	"Old Fun #1"	7:05
8.	"Pine Effect"	4:52
9.	"Dauphine"	6:37
10.	"Roy Castle"	6:41
11.	"Within a Sound"	6:05
12.	"Rain"	5:18
13.	"Tungsten Carbide"	4:12
14.	"Frank"	9:05
15.	"Problematic"	6:12
16.	"Green Crumble"	3:57
Total length:		96:59
