= Yorkshire Arts Association =

Arts funding organization in the United Kingdom

The Yorkshire Arts Association (YAA) was a registered charity founded in 1970, with the goal of fostering the arts in the English county of Yorkshire. It was merged into Yorkshire and Humberside Arts in 1991. The association was known for funding film and video productions, funding 48 films from 1970 to 1986. Its headquarters was in Bradford, West Yorkshire.

The performance art group COUM Transmissions, a precursor of the band Throbbing Gristle, were granted a small Experimental Arts Grant by the YAA.

== See also ==
- New Yorkshire Writing
