= Factory Floor =

British electronic music group

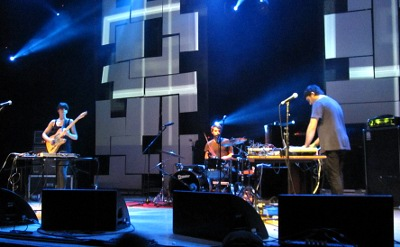
- Performing at the Summer Sundae festival, August 2011

Background information
- Origin: London, England
- Genres: Post-industrial, electronic, minimal techno, acid techno, acid house, experimental, electronic rock
- Years active: 2005–present
- Labels: DFA Records, Blast First Petite, Heart of Data, Phantasy Sound
- Members: Gabriel Gurnsey. Nik Colk Void. Joe Ward
- Past members: Mark Harris Dominic Butler

Factory Floor is a British electronic music group formed in London in 2005. Combining elements of techno, post-industrial music, and experimental electronic music, the band acquired a reputation around the turn of the decade as "one of the loudest, most exhilarating bands around".

== History ==
Factory Floor formed in London in 2005, originally comprising Gabriel Gurnsey and Mark Harris, who were later joined by Dominic Butler. Harris subsequently left the group and went on to form Shift Work.

After two singles in 2008 and the mini-album Talking on Cliffs in 2009, the group signed to Blast First Petite, releasing several twelve-inch singles, including "A Wooden Box", and an untitled mini-album in 2010.

During this period, Gurnsey and Butler were joined by Nik Colk Void, formerly of KaitO, who added vocals, guitar, samples and electronics to the group's increasingly industrial and electronic sound.

The band approached Stephen Morris of New Order and Joy Division to remix "A Wooden Box". Following the remix, Morris continued working with the group as a producer and collaborator. Additional remix releases followed, featuring contributions from Morris and Chris Carter.

=== Factory Floor and 25 25 (2013–2016) ===
The group's debut album, Factory Floor, was released by DFA Records on 9 September 2013. The album received widespread critical acclaim and was ranked third in The Skinny's Albums of the Year list for 2013.

Following the album's release, Dominic Butler departed the group, leaving Factory Floor as a duo consisting of Gabriel Gurnsey and Nik Colk Void.Eede, Christian (2016) “LISTEN: New Factory Floor”, The Quietus, 25 May 2016.

Their second studio album, 25 25, was released on 19 August 2016.Owen, Chris (2016) “LISTEN: More New Factory Floor”, The Quietus, 7 July 2016. The album received positive reviews from critics, including four-star reviews from The Guardian, NME, DIY and The Line of Best Fit.

=== A Soundtrack For A Film and hiatus (2017–2024) ===
In 2017, Factory Floor were commissioned by the Science Museum in London to compose and perform a new live score for Fritz Lang’s 1927 silent film Metropolis. The score premiered at the museum's IMAX cinema and was subsequently developed into the album A Soundtrack For A Film.

Released in 2018 on the band's own Heart of Data imprint, A Soundtrack For A Film reworked material from the live performance into a 150-minute studio recording. The album generated the singles Heart of Data / Babel and Transform / Wonder. The track “Babel” was mixed by producer Marta Salogni. Artwork for the release was created by artist Haroon Mirza and adapted by Nik Colk Void in collaboration with illustrator Sam Moore.

Reviewing the album, Live4ever wrote that the duo “concentrate heavily on matching the film's themes of paranoia and mob hysteria with a series of industrial drones that pulse hypnotically”.

Following the release of A Soundtrack For A Film, Factory Floor entered a period of reduced activity. In a 2024 interview, Gabriel Gurnsey stated that the group had become “burnt out”, adding that “it wasn't like we split up or anything”, but that the break had been necessary.

During the hiatus, Gabriel Gurnsey pursued a solo career, releasing the albums Physical (2018) and Diablo (2023). Issued through Phantasy Sound, Physical developed the dancefloor-focused rhythms and electronic textures associated with Factory Floor, while Diablo explored a broader and more melodic palette. Gurnsey also continued to work as a producer, remixer and collaborator during this period.

Nik Colk Void released a number of solo and collaborative projects including her debut solo album “Bucked Up Space” on Editions Mego label. She also released two albums with Peter Rehberg as part of NPVR and continued collaborations with Alexander Tucker. In 2019 she released Triumvirate, the third and final album by Carter Tutti Void, alongside Chris Carter and Cosey Fanni Tutti. The album followed the group's earlier releases Transverse (2012) and f(x) (2015).

== Return and Phantasy Sound era (2024–present) ==
Factory Floor returned to live performance in 2024 following an extended hiatus, with an appearance at the MUTEK festival in Montréal. The performance reunited Gabriel Gurnsey and Nik Colk Void and featured percussionist Joe Ward, who subsequently became a member of the group. The experience provided the catalyst for the band to resume working together and develop new material as a trio.

The group returned to recording with a series of releases on Erol Alkan's Phantasy Sound label. "Between You" was released in 2025, followed by "Tell Me" later that year. In 2026, the group released "Buzz Saw", further establishing the new line-up of Gurnsey, Colk Void and Ward. The releases combined the group's electronic and industrial influences with a greater emphasis on live percussion and performance.

In October 2026, Factory Floor announced their first studio album in ten years, One Trip, to be released through Phantasy Sound. Spanning ten tracks, the album is the first full-length release by the current line-up of Gurnsey, Colk Void and Ward. The announcement was accompanied by the release of the double single "Continuation" / "One Trip".

In an interview with The Quietus in November 2026, all three members discussed the making of One Trip and the renewed creative relationship within the group. They described how the 2024 MUTEK performance had rekindled their interest in working together after a period pursuing individual projects. Much of the album's material developed through collective work in the studio, with ideas also shaped by live performances. Ward's percussion became an important part of the group's sound, working alongside the electronic sequences and programmed rhythms. The members also discussed the influence of producer Stephen Morris and label founder Erol Alkan on the recording process.

One Trip is scheduled for release in November 2026 through Phantasy Sound, on digital, vinyl, CD and limited cassette editions. This marks the first studio album by Factory Floor's latest three-member line-up.

== Members ==
=== Current members ===
- Gabriel Gurnsey – drums, electronics (2005–present)
- Nik Colk Void – vocals, electronics, guitar (2010–present)
- Joe Ward – drums, percussion (2024–present)

=== Former members ===
- Mark Harris
- Dominic Butler – bass, electronics (2005–2013)

== Discography ==
=== Studio albums ===
- Factory Floor (2013, DFA Records)
- 25 25 (2016, DFA Records)
- A Soundtrack for a Film (2018, Heart of Data)
- One Trip (2026, Phantasy Sound)

=== Singles ===
- "Heart of Data" / "Babel" (2018)
- "Transform" / "Wonder" (2018)
- "Between You" (2025, Phantasy Sound)
- "Tell Me" (2025, Phantasy Sound)
- "Buzz Saw" (2026, Phantasy Sound)
- "Continuation" / "One Trip" (2026, Phantasy Sound)

== Reception ==
Factory Floor have been described as a significant act within the UK underground electronic music scene of the 2010s.

Their debut album was ranked third in The Skinnys Albums of the Year list for 2013.

25 25 received widespread critical acclaim, including four-star reviews from The Guardian, NME and DIY, and an 8.5/10 from The Line of Best Fit.

Their 2024 return was positively received by critics, who highlighted the continuation of their intense live performance style and the emergence of a stable three-person creative lineup.
