= Cosey Fanni Tutti =

British performance artist, musician and writer (born 1951)

- Cosey Fanni Tutti performing with Throbbing Gristle in Brooklyn, New York in 2009

Background information
- Born: Christine Carol Newby; 4 November 1951 (age 75); Hull, Yorkshire, England
- Genres: Industrial; electronic; experimental
- Occupations: Performance artist; musician; writer
- Instruments: Guitar; cornet; vocals
- Years active: 1969–present
- Labels: Conspiracy International; Flowmotion
- Member of: Chris & Cosey; Carter Tutti Void
- Formerly of: COUM Transmissions; Throbbing Gristle
- Website: coseyfannitutti.com

Christine Carol Newby (born 4 November 1951), better known as Cosey Fanni Tutti, is an English performance artist, musician, and writer, best known for her time in the avant-garde groups Throbbing Gristle and Chris & Cosey.

Tutti first performed under the name Cosmosis. According to Throbbing Gristle biographer Simon Ford, the name of Cosey Fanni Tutti was suggested to her by mail artist Robin Klassnick based on the title of the opera Così fan tutte, literally meaning "That's what they all do"— ‌they being women, hence, "That's what all women do".

== Early career ==
Tutti was a performer with COUM Transmissions, of which she was a founding member in 1969. Her addition changed the nature of the group, which had been mostly a musical venture. From that point on, COUM performances became events involving props, costumes, dance, improvisation and street theatre. As an installation artist, she was selected in 1975 to represent Britain at the IXth Biennale de Paris.

== Visual art works and performance art ==
Tutti worked for two years on the Prostitution project as part of COUM Transmissions, in which she created an exhibition about the pornography and sex industry and worked as a model for sex magazines and films. It was shown at the Institute of Contemporary Arts, London in 1976. Censorship restrictions were imposed on the exhibition so that only one image could be viewed at a time. The project also involved events in which women working in the sex industry and the public could discuss issues about the industry and prostitution. Tutti also utilised her own used tampons and used nappies from Mary Kelly's work. This "aroused hysterical reactions from the British media and art establishment, unable to address the political implications of the work."

== Pornography ==
Tutti had a long career as a stripper and in the fields of pornographic film and magazines stemming from a desire to incorporate her own image into collages that she produced in this period. This willingness to consciously participate in the process of commercial image production has inspired a number of visual and performance artists. Some of her performance artwork has also drawn on her experience as an adult performer. In 1978, she appeared as a dancer in the music video for American singer Sylvester's disco song "You Make Me Feel (Mighty Real)" with three other women from her stripping agency in London, alongside several dancers from Pineapple Dance Studios. She also participated in several erotic videos of Francky Vincent, aka Dr. Porno.

== Music career ==
Music was used in some of Tutti's performance art. The use of music led to Tutti's interest in the concept of "acceptable" music and she went on to explore the use of sound as a means of physical pleasure or pain. In 1976, she cofounded the group Throbbing Gristle with Chris Carter, Peter 'Sleazy' Christopherson and Genesis P-Orridge. The group disbanded in 1981.

Following the breakup of Throbbing Gristle, Genesis P-Orridge and Peter Christopherson went on to form Psychic TV, while Tutti and Chris Carter continued to record together under the moniker Chris & Cosey, with the duo combining their interest and skills in avant-garde music with the sounds and structures of the then-nascent genres of synthpop and electronic dance music. In honour of the dawn of the 21st century, Chris & Cosey changed their stage name to Carter Tutti, and the project pivoted to focus more on experimental ambient sounds. In 2004, after 23 years apart, all four original members of Throbbing Gristle reunited, and they issued a new 12" recording, TG Now. The band continued to collaborate sporadically and began to perform live shows together for the first time in over two decades. In April 2009, Throbbing Gristle toured the U.S., appearing at the Coachella Valley Music and Arts Festival and playing shows in Los Angeles, New York, San Francisco and Chicago.

In October 2010, Throbbing Gristle began a European tour; however, following the band's first tour date at the London Village Underground venue, London, on 23 October, their website announced that Genesis P-Orridge was no longer willing to perform with the band, and would return to their home in New York. Chris, Cosey and Peter finished the tour without P-Orridge, under the name X-TG.

Carter and Tutti performed with Nik Colk Void of Factory Floor at Mute's Short Circuit Festival on 13 May 2011. A live album of the show, with an additional studio track, was released as Transverse in 2012, under the name Carter Tutti Void. The trio also released f (x) (2015) and Triumvirate (2019).

In 2025, Tutti released her solo album, 2t2.

== Later life ==
Tutti continues to release solo recordings, including a retrospective deluxe box set with many photos and text called Time to Tell, and she continues to work as a performance artist in the Dada tradition. She co-edited (with Richard Birkett) and published (Koenig Books, 2012), Maria Fusco's Cosey Complex, the first major publication to discuss and theorise about Tutti as methodology. In 2017, she published her autobiography Art Sex Music.

In 2018, Tutti discussed her life and career with actress Maxine Peake on BBC Radio Four's programme Only Artists.

In 2022, Tutti published a book, Re-Sisters, which explores connections between her own work, the recordings of Delia Derbyshire, and the writings of Margery Kempe.

== Discography ==
Excluding Throbbing Gristle, Carter Tutti, or Chris & Cosey releases:

- Time to Tell (Flowmotion, 1983)
- Nicki (with John Duncan and Chris Carter; AQM, 1983)
- Electronic Ambient Remixes 4: Selflessness (Conspiracy International, 2004)
- Mist While Sleeping (with Philippe Petit; Dirter Promotions, 2010)
- Transverse (with Chris Carter and Nik Colk Void, as Carter Tutti Void; Mute, 2012)
- f (x) (with Chris Carter and Nik Colk Void, as Carter Tutti Void; Industrial Records, 2015)
- Triumvirate (with Chris Carter and Nik Colk Void, as Carter Tutti Void; Conspiracy International, 2019)
- Tutti (Conspiracy International, 2019)
- Delia Derbyshire: The Myths and the Legendary Tapes (soundtrack; Mute Song, 2022)
- 2t2 (Conspiracy International, 2025)

== Videos ==
- A Study in Scarlet (Conspiracy International, 1986)

== Books ==
- Art Sex Music (Faber & Faber, 2017)
- Re-Sisters (Faber & Faber, 2022)
