= Tango n' Vectif =

Studio album by μ-Ziq
- Released: November 1993
- Genre: Ambient techno; IDM
- Length: 78:24 (CD); 90:35 (vinyl)
- Label: Rephlex
- Producer: Michael Paradinas Richard D. James

Μ-Ziq chronology
Tango n' Vectif (1993)	Bluff Limbo (1994)

Alternative cover

Tango n' Vectif is the debut studio album by English electronic music producers Mike Paradinas and Francis Naughton under the stage name μ-Ziq. It was released in November 1993 by Rephlex. The cover photo of the original release was taken by Richard D. James.

Tango n' Vectif was re-released on 1 October 2001 as a double CD with additional tracks that were on the original vinyl and CD releases as well as the "Phi * 1700" single.

== Reception ==
Professional ratings
Review scores
Source	Rating
AllMusic	5/5 stars
Pitchfork	9.4/10
Select	4/5

In a positive review, Rupert Howe of Select stated that "like many of the Rephlex releases, it may sound rough-hewn, but there's nothing unsophisticated about the music."

== Track listing ==
CD release
No.	Title	Length
1.	"Tango n' Vectif"	4:03
2.	"Swan Vesta"	6:09
3.	"Burnt Sienna"	8:06
4.	"Iesope"	5:56
5.	"Auqeam"	3:58
6.	"Vibes"	3:54
7.	"μ-Ziq Theme"	4:36
8.	"The Sonic Fox"	5:33
9.	"Amenida" (CD exclusive)	5:54
10.	"Whale Soup" (CD exclusive)	3:22
11.	"Xenith Filigree Anus (Edit)" (CD exclusive)	5:01
12.	"Die Zweite Heimat"	5:31
13.	"Phragmal Synthesis Pt. 3"	4:49
14.	"Phi * 1700 (U/V)"	5:56
15.	"Beatnik #2"	5:36
Total length:		78:24

Vinyl release
No.	Title	Length
1.	"Tango n' Vectif"	4:03
2.	"Swan Vesta"	6:09
3.	"Burnt Sienna"	8:06
4.	"Iesope"	5:56
5.	"μ-Ziq Theme"	4:36
6.	"Auqeam"	3:58
7.	"Vibes"	3:54
8.	"Ad Misericordiam" (vinyl exclusive)	3:23
9.	"Beatnik #2"	5:36
10.	"Die Zweite Heimat"	5:30
11.	"The Sonic Fox"	5:33
12.	"Caesium" (vinyl exclusive)	5:44
13.	"Phi * 1700 (U/V)"	5:56
14.	"4 Time Egg" (vinyl exclusive)	5:48
15.	"Phragmal Synthesis Pt. 1" (vinyl exclusive)	5:32
16.	"Phragmal Synthesis Pt. 2" (vinyl exclusive)	6:02
17.	"Phragmal Synthesis Pt. 3"	4:49
Total length:		90:35

2001 CD release – Disc 1
No.	Title	Length
1.	"Tango n' Vectif"	4:10
2.	"Swan Vesta"	6:10
3.	"Burnt Sienna"	8:07
4.	"Iesope"	5:56
5.	"μ-Ziq Theme"	4:37
6.	"Auqeam"	3:58
7.	"Vibes"	3:55
8.	"Ad Misericordiam"	3:29
9.	"Beatnik #2"	5:37
10.	"Die Zweite Heimat"	5:32
11.	"The Sonic Fox"	5:33
12.	"Caesium"	5:39
13.	"Phi * 1700 (U/V)"	8:11
Total length:		70:54

2001 CD release – Disc 2
No.	Title	Length
1.	"4 Time Egg"	5:52
2.	"Phragmal Synthesis Pt. 1"	5:33
3.	"Phragmal Synthesis Pt. 2"	6:04
4.	"Phragmal Synthesis Pt. 3"	4:51
5.	"Xenith Filigree Anus"	7:46
6.	"Whale Soup"	3:21
7.	"Amenida 2"	5:35
8.	"Paco"	4:03
9.	"Crosstown Traffic"	6:05
10.	"Xolbe 2"	7:15
11.	"Driving Is Easy"	5:02
12.	"Methyl Albion"	3:36
13.	"Glink"	7:22
Total length:		72:25
