= Lunatic Harness =

Studio album by μ-Ziq
- Released: 30 June 1997
- Genre: Drill 'n' bass; IDM
- Length: 70:51
- Label: Planet Mu
- Producer: Mike Paradinas

μ-Ziq chronology
In Pine Effect (1995)	Lunatic Harness (1997)	Brace Yourself (1998)

Singles from Lunatic Harness
- 1. "My Little Beautiful" Released: 1997; 2. "Brace Yourself" Released: 1998

Lunatic Harness is the fourth studio album by English electronic music producer Mike Paradinas under the stage name μ-Ziq. It was released on 30 June 1997 in the United Kingdom on the Planet Mu label, and on 29 July 1997 in the United States on the Astralwerks label. It was rereleased with bonus tracks from the My Little Beautiful and Brace Yourself singles in 2022 for its 25th anniversary.

== Critical reception ==
Professional ratings
Review scores
Source	Rating
AllMusic	5/5 stars
Muzik	8/10
NME	8/10
Pitchfork	8.3/10
Rolling Stone	3.5/5 stars

A retrospective Apple Music editorial review describes Lunatic Harness as "the prettiest album to come out of the mid-'90s 'drill 'n' bass' movement", noting that Paradinas eschewed the abrasiveness of similar works by Squarepusher and Aphex Twin in favor of "atmospheres of ethereal color and shimmering melody", bringing the album "closer to pop music than anything Paradinas had previously attempted".

In 2013, Spin named Lunatic Harness one of the 20 best Astralwerks albums. In 2017, Pitchfork placed it at number 27 on its list of "The 50 Best IDM Albums of All Time".

== Track listing ==
All tracks are written by Mike Paradinas.

No.	Title	Length
1.	"Brace Yourself Jason"	6:22
2.	"Hasty Boom Alert"	5:15
3.	"Mushroom Compost"	3:19
4.	"Blainville"	3:40
5.	"Lunatic Harness"	6:05
6.	"Approaching Menace"	7:01
7.	"My Little Beautiful"	5:39
8.	"Secret Stair Pt. 1"	4:16
9.	"Secret Stair Pt. 2"	5:00
10.	"Wannabe"	6:49
11.	"Catkin and Teasel"	4:36
12.	"London"	6:11
13.	"Midwinter Log"	6:38
Total length:		70:51
