= Chris Carter (British musician) =

English musician (born 1953)

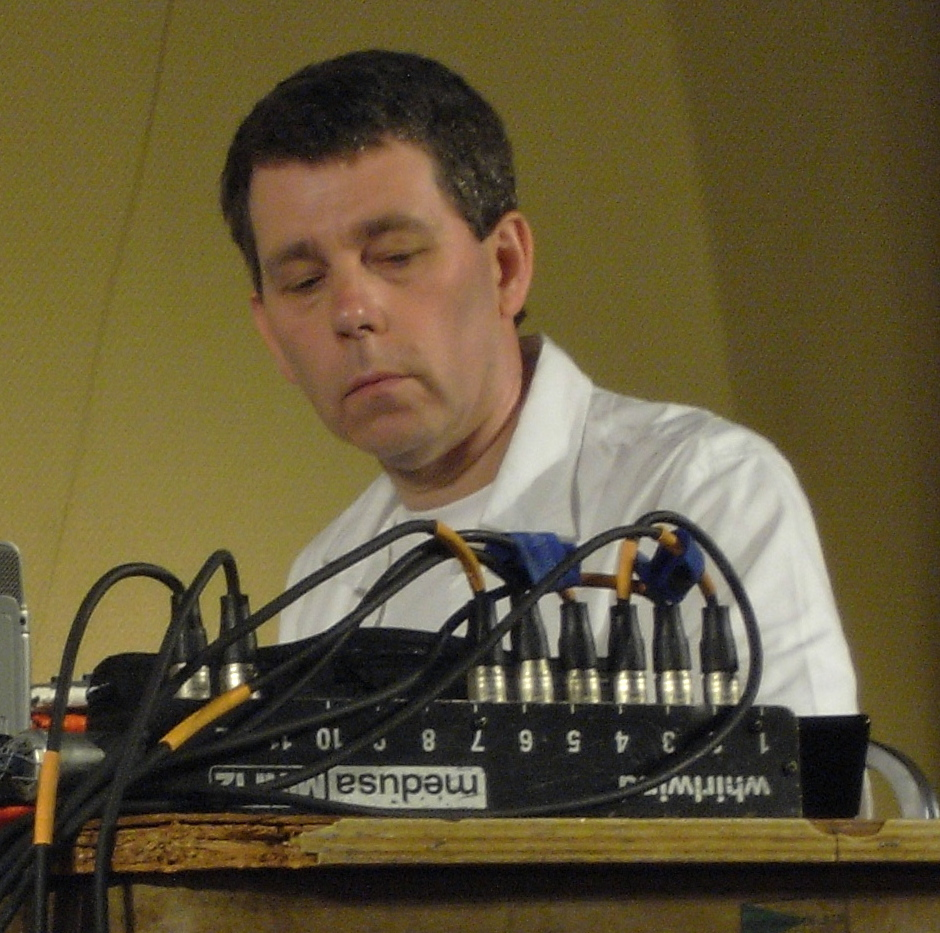
- Chris Carter with Throbbing Gristle (2009)

Background information
- Born: 28 January 1953 (age 73); Islington, North London, England
- Genres: Electronic; industrial
- Occupations: Musician; composer; engineer; producer
- Instruments: Synthesizer; keyboards; programming; sampler
- Label: Third Mind
- Member of: Chris & Cosey; Carter Tutti Void
- Formerly of: Throbbing Gristle

Chris Carter (born 28 January 1953) is an English musician, best known for being a member of Throbbing Gristle and the duo Chris & Cosey, both with his longtime partner Cosey Fanni Tutti.

== Background ==
Carter was born 28 January 1953 in Islington, North London and educated at Friern Barnet Grammar School.

He began his career in the late 1960s working for various UK TV stations (Thames, Granada and LWT) as a sound engineer on numerous TV shows and documentaries. This gave him an invaluable grounding in audio techniques and theories. He also found himself getting more involved in the visual side of entertainment, which eventually progressed into designing and presenting light shows and visual effects for numerous festivals, events and gigs, including for bands as diverse as Yes and Hawkwind. This led to commissions for the BBC Television shows Colour Me Pop and The Old Grey Whistle Test. By the early 1970s Carter was touring universities and colleges with a solo multimedia show, playing self-built synthesizers and keyboards and incorporating myriad lighting effects learned from his previous work. During this time he also worked extensively with visual artist John Lacey on many 8 mm & 16 mm experimental films and multimedia presentations.

In the mid-1970s, through his connection with Lacey, Carter began an experimental music/sound collaboration with Cosey Fanni Tutti and Genesis P-Orridge, who were also working at the time as performance art group COUM Transmissions along with Peter Christopherson. The results of this musical collaboration were the creation of the group Throbbing Gristle, of the music label Industrial Records, and the birth of the 'Industrial Music' genre.

In 1976, Carter also worked at the London bureau of the ABC News agency as a sound engineer and during that time designed and constructed their London radio studio. In 1977 he was offered a contract to build another ABC studio in Rome but turned it down to continue his involvement as a member of Throbbing Gristle.

During the early years of Throbbing Gristle, the four members each continued with other solo projects and work. It was during this period (1980) when Carter recorded his first solo album for Industrial Records called The Space Between, which is now available on Mute Records. Shortly after the demise of Throbbing Gristle in 1981, and with help and backing from Rough Trade Records, Carter and Cosey Fanni Tutti formed their Conspiracy International (CTI) record label, and began working together as Chris & Cosey and CTI. Initially they released only music, but soon moved into producing video works, and with the help of Doublevision released a number of CTI experimental video films and soundtracks. In 1985 Carter released his second solo album Mondo Beat.

As well as successfully touring all over the world, Chris & Cosey also recorded and collaborated on innumerable releases, most notably with Annie Lennox and Dave Stewart, Robert Wyatt, Coil, Boyd Rice, Lustmord, Monte Cazazza and many more. Chris & Cosey and Carter Tutti have also remixed tracks for Mortal Loom and Erasure, Pantaleimon, Throbbing Gristle, John Cage, Current 93 and Chris Ewan (FBH).

In 1994, Carter also moved into journalism, and regularly has technical articles and reviews published in the magazine Sound on Sound. He is additionally a keen photographer and graphic designer, and in collaboration with Cosey Fanni Tutti has designed and produced numerous album covers, posters and art works. Carter returned to solo performance work in 1995 after a gap of 15 years. His performances included subtle references to his earlier works, but with obvious influences from his more recent collaborations. In 1998 Carter released a compilation CD entitled Disobedient, consisting of tracks from his 1995 Disobey tour (produced by Paul Smith). In 2000 he released a solo studio album, Small Moon. In 1998 the album Caged, a collaboration with electronic musician Ian Boddy, was released on the DiN label.

In 2000, Carter, in collaboration with Cosey Fanni Tutti, began producing and releasing a series of albums titled: Electronic Ambient Remixes. The first of these, EAR ONE, consisted of dark ambient remixes of his 1980 The Space Between album. In 2002 he released EAR THREE, a further solo ambient CD, which consists of radical remixes of original Throbbing Gristle industrial rhythm tracks.

In 2003, Carter and Cosey Fanni Tutti stopped releasing material and performing as Chris & Cosey, and began producing all their work under the title of Carter Tutti. One of their first appearances as Carter Tutti was a special quadraphonic performance in the Disney Theatre at the Museum of Contemporary Art, Los Angeles in 2005. Carter and the other original members of Throbbing Gristle regrouped the band in 2003 and released the TG24 CD boxed set, with an accompanying art exhibition in London. TG performances followed in London, Camber Sands, Turin, Berlin, Barcelona and Paris.

During 2007, Carter and Cosey Fanni Tutti again worked on numerous Throbbing Gristle projects, recordings, installations, exhibitions and performances. These included their groundbreaking audio/visual performance at Tate Modern turbine hall and their three-day 'public recording session' at the ICA in London. Carter worked on a Carter Tutti album entitled Feral Vapours of the Silver Ether, which is released in 2007 on the Conspiracy International label. Carter continues to work and collaborate with both Cosey Fanni Tutti and Throbbing Gristle. He is also working on a solo experimental audio project titled CCCL, and produced a new Carter Tutti film, released on DVD in 2008.

In 2012, Carter released Transverse, a collaborative album with Cosey Fanni Tutti and Nik Colk Void, under the group name Carter Tutti Void. The trio also released f (x) (2015) and Triumvirate (2019).

== Inventions ==
Carter has invented a sound generator called The Dirty Carter Experimental Sound Generating Instrument, a circuit bending device with a tilt sensor.

Carter also co-invented The Gristleizer, a sound effects unit based on the design of a guitar effects pedal from Roy Gwinn. The Gristleizer effects unit is regarded as a major contributor to the Throbbing Gristle sound.

== Discography ==
(NOT including Throbbing Gristle, Carter Tutti or Chris & Cosey releases)

- The Space Between (Industrial Records, 1980)
- Nicki (with John Duncan and Cosey Fanni Tutti; AQM, 1983)
- Mondo Beat (CTI/Rough Trade, 1985)
- Collectiv 1 (CTI, 1996)
- Disobedient (CTI, 1998)
- Small Moon (CTI, 1999)
- Caged (with Ian Boddy; DiN, 2000)
- Electronic Ambient Remixes 1 (CTI, 2000)
- Electronic Ambient Remixes 3 (CTI, 2002)
- Moonlight (Optimo Music, 2011)
- Transverse (with Cosey Fanni Tutti and Nik Colk Void, as Carter Tutti Void; Mute, 2012)
- f (x) (with Cosey Fanni Tutti and Nik Colk Void, as Carter Tutti Void; Industrial, 2015)
- Chemistry Lessons: Volume One (Mute, 2018)
- Triumvirate (with Cosey Fanni Tutti and Nik Colk Void, as Carter Tutti Void; Conspiracy International, 2019)
