= Crack (magazine) =

British music and culture magazine

- Editor: Louise Brailey
- Categories: Music
- Frequency: Monthly
- Format: Newsprint
- Publisher: Crack Industries Ltd
- Founder: Jake Applebee and Thomas Frost
- Founded: 2009
- Country: United Kingdom
- Based in: Bristol
- Language: English
- Website: crackmagazine.net

Crack is a monthly independent music and culture magazine distributed across Europe.

Founded in Bristol in the UK in 2009, the magazine has featured the likes of Björk, MF Doom, Lil Yachty, FKA Twigs, Gorillaz, Queens of the Stone Age, Vegyn, Oklou, Thundercat, André 3000, Clairo, Oneohtrix Point Never and Flying Lotus on the cover. The same team, still based in Bristol are also involved with the curation of Simple Things Festival there.

== History ==
Crack was founded in 2009 by graphic designer Jake Applebee and journalism graduate Thomas Frost.

In 2012, they secured the first independent music magazine interview with Flying Lotus ahead of his fourth studio album Until The Quiet Comes.

In 2015, the magazine launched a Berlin edition. In 2017, they launched an edition in Amsterdam.

In May 2019, they launched their 100th issue with Radiohead frontman Thom Yorke.

In 2021 they launched CC Co, a creative agency dubbed 'Crack Creative Company'. CC Co is led by Crack Magazine’s head of content Duncan Harrison, alongside company directors Luke Sutton and Jake Applebee.
