= Venetian Snares discography =

Aaron Funk discography
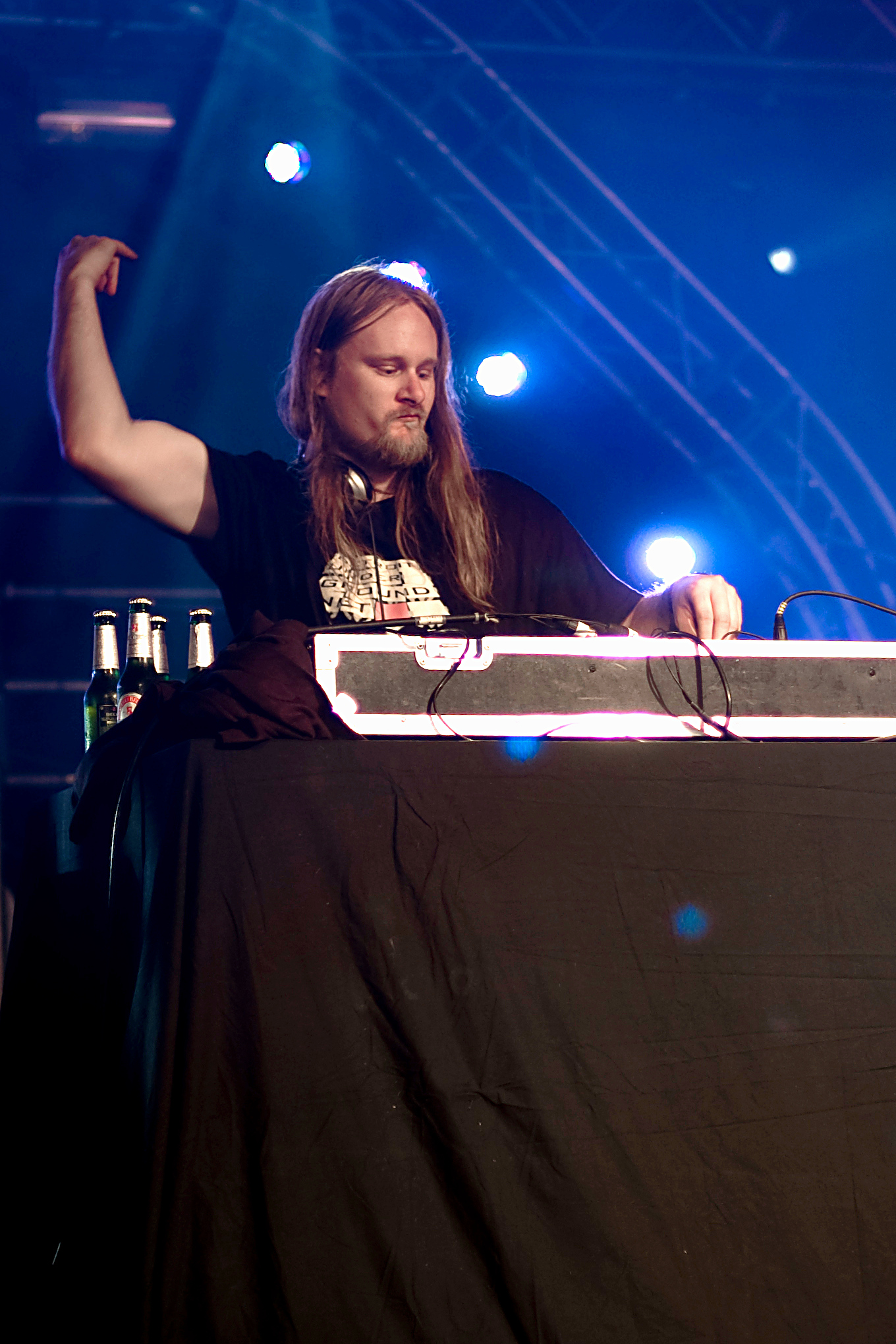
- Funk performing at Ilosaarirock 2008
- Studio albums: 24
- EPs: 19
- Compilation albums: 2
- Singles: 9
- Music videos: 3
- Promotional singles: 4
- Remixes: 1

Canadian electronic musician Aaron Funk, better known as Venetian Snares, has released 24 studio albums, one live album, two compilation albums, 19 extended plays (EPs), eight singles, four promotional singles, one remix, and one music video. Funk began producing music in 1992 and self-released several cassettes during the 90's. He released his first three studio albums in cassette. These albums are Spells and Subvert! both released in 1998, and Rorschach Stuffoacte released in 1999. He released the 1999 EP, Greg Hates Car Culture, followed by his fourth studio album, printf("shiver in eternal darkness/n"); in May 2000.

After hearing Greg Hates Car Culture Mike Paradinas signed Funk to his record label Planet Mu, under which he released his fifth studio album, Songs About My Cats in April 2001 and several other projects. In the same year, he released the album Doll Doll Doll under Hymen Records. The following year, 2002, Funk released three full-length albums, Higgins Ultra Low Track Glue Funk Hits 1972–2006, 2370894 (Under Vsnares), and Winter in the Belly of a Snake. In February 2003 Funk released the EP Find Candace, a companion piece to Doll Doll Doll. In October he released his ninth studio album The Chocolate Wheelchair Album. He also released an experimental collaborative album with Hecate, Nymphomatriarch, and other work under the name Beesnares the same year. In June 2004, Funk released Huge Chrome Cylinder Box Unfolding which was praised by critics, followed by three EPs, Horse And Goat, Infolepsy EP, and Moonglow/This Bitter Earth and a remix of Doormouse's "Skelechairs". In January 2005 he released Winnipeg Is A Frozen Shithole in tribute to his hometown.

In March 2005 Funk released the full-length album Rossz Csillag Alatt Született to critical acclaim which brought him as an artist and the genre breakcore to greater prominence. In 2007 he released the follow-up album, My Downfall (Original Soundtrack) which focused less on breakcore style drumbeats and more on an atmospheric classical sound. Between 2007 and 2010 Funk released more projects under several aliases including a series of dubstep-styled Black Sabbath covers under Snares, the eponymous album Last Step, Detrimentalist and Filth as Venetian Snares, and Speed Dealer Moms EP with Red Hot Chili Peppers guitarist John Frusciante under Speed Dealer Moms. In August 2010, Funk released the first album under his own label Timesig, My So-Called Life. Between 2011 and 2012 he released three EPs and the album Sleep under Last Step. After a year's hiatus in 2013 Funk released his first Venetian Snares album in three years, Live At WTW 07 (AKA Return Of The Snare) - June 15, 2001 in 2013 followed by My Love Is A Bulldozer, in June 2014. In 2014/2015 Funk also released self-titled debut collaborative album with Joanne Pollock, Poemss, the Your Face EP, and Thank You for Your Consideration.

In February 2016 Funk released Traditional Synthesizer Music to relative commercial success peaking at number 6 on the Billboard Dance/Electronic Albums chart. After a two-year hiatus, in January 2018 Funk released his twenty-third Venetian Snares studio album She Began To Cry Tears Of Blood Which Became Little Brick Houses When They Hit The Ground. In 2018 the collaborative single Mag11 P82 was released by Venetian Snares and Daniel Lanois. The album Venetian Snares x Daniel Lanois was released in May that year.

== As Venetian Snares ==
=== Studio albums ===
- Spells (1998, self-release)
- Subvert! (1998, self-release)
- Rorschach Stuffocate (1999, self-release)
- printf("shiver in eternal darkness/n"); (2000, Isolate Records; 2013 re-issue, self-release)
- Songs About My Cats (2001, Planet Mu)
- Doll Doll Doll (2001, Hymen Records)
- Higgins Ultra Low Track Glue Funk Hits 1972–2006 (2002, Planet Mu)
- Winter in the Belly of a Snake (2002, Planet Mu)
- The Chocolate Wheelchair Album (2003, Planet Mu)
- Huge Chrome Cylinder Box Unfolding (2004, Planet Mu)
- Winnipeg Is a Frozen Shithole (2005, Sublight Records)
- Rossz Csillag Alatt Született (2005, Planet Mu)
- Meathole (2005, Planet Mu)
- Cavalcade of Glee and Dadaist Happy Hardcore Pom Poms (2006, Planet Mu)
- My Downfall (Original Soundtrack) (2007, Planet Mu)
- Detrimentalist (2008, Planet Mu)
- Filth (2009, Planet Mu)
- My So-Called Life (2010, Timesig)
- Live at WTW 07 (AKA Return of the Snare) – June 15, 2001 (2013, Addict Records)
- My Love Is a Bulldozer (2014, Planet Mu)
- Thank You for Your Consideration (2015, self-released)
- Traditional Synthesizer Music (2016, Planet Mu)
- She Began to Cry Tears of Blood Which Became Little Brick Houses When They Hit the Ground (2018, self-released)
- Greg Hates Car Culture (2019, Timesig)

=== Collaborative studio albums ===
- Barrage (1998, split with DJ Fishead, self-release)
- Eat Shit and Die (1998, split with DJ Fishead, self-release)
- Fuck Canada // Fuck America (1999, CLFST, split with Stunt Rock)
- Making Orange Things (2001, Planet Mu, collaboration with Speedranch)
- Venetian Snares x Daniel Lanois (2018, Timesig, collaboration with Daniel Lanois)

=== 12″s, 7″s, EPs, and mini-releases ===
- Fake:Impossible (1997, self-release)
- Greg Hates Car Culture (1999, History of the Future)
- Salt (2000, Zhark International)
- 7 Sevens.med EP (2000, Low Res)
- White Label (2001, Hangars Liquides)
- Defluxion / Boarded Up Swan Entrance (2001, Planet Mu)
- Shitfuckers!!! (2001, Dyslexic Response)
- The Connected Series #2 (collaboration with Cex) (2001, Klangkrieg)
- A Giant Alien Force More Violent & Sick Than Anything You Can Imagine (2002, Hymen Records)
- Find Candace (2003, Hymen Records)
- Badminton (2003, Addict Records)
- Einstein-Rosen Bridge (2003, Planet Mu)
- Nymphomatriarch (2003, Hymen Records, collaboration with Hecate)
- Podsjfkj Pojid Poa (2003, Double H Noise Industries, split with Phantomsmasher)
- Skelechairs (2004, Addict Records, collaboration with Doormouse)
- Moonglow / This Bitter Earth (2004, Addict Records)
- Horse and Goat (2004, Sublight Records)
- Infolepsy EP (2004, Coredump Records)
- Hospitality (2006, Planet Mu)
- Pink + Green (2007, Sublight Records)
- Miss Balaton (2008, Planet Mu)
- Horsey Noises (2009, Planet Mu)
- Cubist Reggae (2011, Planet Mu)
- Affectionate (2012, Mute Song)
- Fool the Detector (2012, Timesig)
- Your Face (2015, Planet Mu)
- Mag11 P82 (2018, Planet Mu, collaboration with Daniel Lanois)
- Drums (2025, Planet Mu)

==== Music videos ====
- Find Candace (from Find Candace EP)
- Szamár Madár (from Rossz Csillag Alatt Született)
- Everything about you is special (from Traditional Synthesiser Music)

== As Last Step ==
=== Albums ===
- Last Step (2007, Planet Mu)
- 1961 (2008, Planet Mu)
- Sleep (2012, Planet Mu)

=== 12″s, 7″s, EPs, and mini-releases ===
- You're A Nice Girl (2005, Planet Mu)
- Bhavani (2006, Project 168)
- Lost Sleep (2015, self-release)

== Collaborative aliases ==
=== As Speed Dealer Moms ===
- Speed Dealer Moms EP (2010, Timesig, collaborative EP with John Frusciante and Chris McDonald)
- SDM-LA8-441-114-211 (2021, Evar Records)
- Birth Control Pill / Benakis (2024, Evar Records)

=== As Poemss ===
- Poemss (2014, Planet Mu, collaborative album with Joanne Pollock)

== Other aliases ==
=== As Snares Man! ===
- Clearance Bin/Breakbeat Malaria (2001, History of the Future)

=== As Vsnares ===
- 2370894 (2002, Planet Mu)

=== As BeeSnares ===
- Leopards Of Mass Destruction (2003, Death$ucker Records, split with Fanny)

=== As Hawerchuk ===
- Camel Toe (2004, Planet Mu)
- Four Messengers (2006, Planet Mu)

=== As Snares ===
- Sabbath Dubs (2007, Kriss Records)
