= Jan Robbe =

Belgian electronic musician

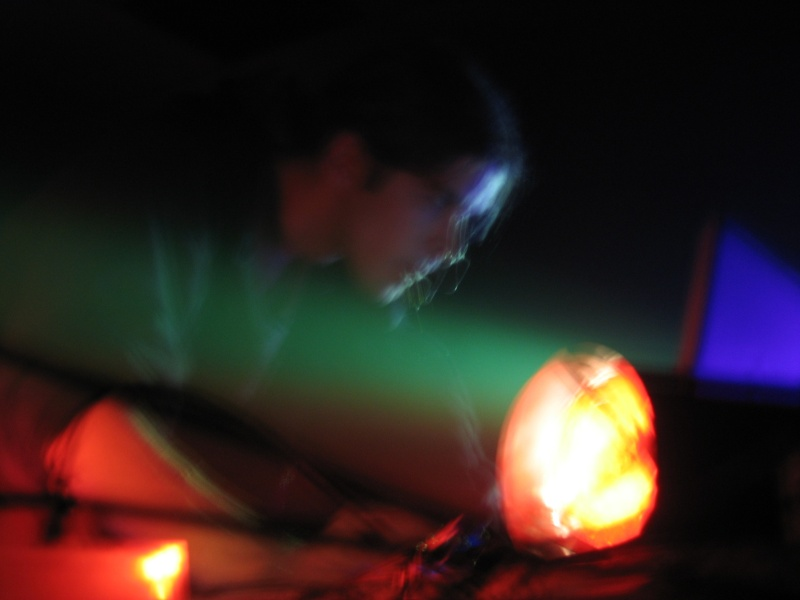
- Jan Robbe performing as Atomhead at the 2008 "Only the Hard Survive" festival in Waregem, Belgium

Background information
- Also known as: Atomhead, Erratic, UndaCova, Diagnostic
- Born: Jan Robbe; 14 June 1980 (age 46); Ghent, Belgium
- Origin: Ghent, Belgium
- Genres: Electronic music
- Occupations: Musician, record label runner, remixer, sound engineer, graphic designer, game designer
- Instruments: Synthesizer, electronics, laptop, computer, sampler
- Years active: 1999–present
- Labels: Entity, Hive Records, Hangars Liquides, Dyslexic Response, Mystery Sea, Mirakel Musik, Enough Records, Autoplate

Jan Robbe (born 14 June 1980 in Ghent, Belgium), otherwise known by his music project aliases Atomhead, Erratic, UndaCova and Diagnostic, is an electronic music artist. He founded the experimental netlabel Entity in 2003 with friend Nico de Gols (aka Kaebin Yield). Jan Robbe is known for expressing various musical styles under different pseudonyms. Atomhead and UndaCova, his two most prominent projects, focus on fractured industrial beats and densely textured DSP sound design techniques, whereas Erratic is a vehicle for pursuing more minimal long-form ambiental directions. The most recent (2018) Diagnostic project explores experimental sound design, glitch and noise structures, combining digital and modular synthesis. Robbe has released music on distinguished labels such as Dyslexic Response and Hangars Liquides, and collaborated with artists who operate in similar aesthetic domains, including La Peste, Neurocore, Subskan and Xanopticon.

Besides his activities as music producer, Robbe is also known for creating generative (mostly fractal) graphic design as FRAMEofMIND and as an indie game developer responsible for creating Hyperspace Invaders, a bullet hell shmup with audiovisual and generative gameplay characteristics.

== Projects ==
=== UndaCova ===
In 1999 Jan Robbe adopted the name "UndaCova" to release IDM experiments using FL Studio, which remains one of his favourite programs. These include S-T-U-C-K (2001) on the Arghprkl netlabel, and a series of meditative brainwave synchronizers released on Theta. An illbient split with Affective Disorder entitled Study of a Ladybug on a Rope was later released on Autoplate. Robbe's influences at this time included the post-rock and trip hop genres, as well as old video game music, which inspired the Metamood Katalyst 12" released on Pleemobil. Say Vegin of Freestyle Magazine drew comparisons in the album's sound to 8-bit, calling it a collection of "hard-tek cut-ups, textured polygons and hypnotizing synths". By the end of 2002, Robbe had founded the xE Phalanx project, a joint collaboration with artists from around the world. UndaCova would go on to participate in two xE Phalanx albums; 5E Phalanx's Pragmatic Impulse and 7E Phalanx's Pulse, both released on the Entity netlabel.

A dramatic shift in sound occurred in 2003 with the self-released power noise EP Human Nature. This period was marked by dark soundscaping and assaulting beat constructions, culminating in 2006 with the release of Intrusion on Isolate Records. The music of Intrusion is noted for its hyper-intensity, sonic density and high production values. It contains remixes by Polish cybercore artist Neurocore and Belgian musician Imminent. Luca Maini of Igloo Magazine summarized the album's sound as "Somatic Responses mangled and speeded up to create a teeth-grinding industrial monster, ultra processed and with thousands of razor sharp beats packed together. .... This is the perfect music if you like Richard Devine but you think he should stick to the smashing stuff he performs live, or maybe you think Venetian Snares is a genius but he's gone too melodic." UndaCova has remixed tracks by Danny Kreutzfeldt, White Nois Stasis and Diagram of Suburban Chaos, and is also featured on the Mirex Carbon compilation, Thinner's Recore remix album, Somia's Miad, and the Polymorphik Piece series released on PuZZling Rec. The project went undercover in 2007.

=== Atomhead ===
Atomhead was founded in 2004 as a means to evolve the sounds already explored with the UndaCova moniker. Often compared with the cyberdelic flashcore experiments of La Peste, Atomhead released Spiral Field Velocity 2.0 in 2005 on La Peste's Hangars Liquides label, the main stable behind flashcore and experimental speedcore. Atomhead has also been likened to 60's-era Iannis Xenakis and power electronics. Atomhead appeared on numerous compilations throughout 2007 and 2008, including Vortex on Entity, Delayed Reaction on Peace Off, and We Are The Music Breakerz on Reconfiguration Records. Atomhead has remixed tracks by Sedarka, Ronny Ragtroll, Xanopticon, and Prometheus Burning, among others.

=== Erratic ===
2003 saw the inception of Erratic, a side-project for abstract, "highly immersive soundscapes" and psycho-/electro-acoustic sound art. The aim of Erratic is to "unify sound with thoughts and imaginary visual landscapes". For most of Erratic's output, Robbe eschews computer-generated beats and rhythms in favour of "exotic instruments" and contact microphone-derived sounds, which are subsequently manipulated using various audio editors. The results often sound organic in nature, with comparisons drawn to mediterranean and oceanic settings, as well as the drone and microsound genres. In 2004 Erratic and ambient artist Hackeronte joined to form Pandemia. On the day of the transit of Venus in 2004, they released the self-described "spacetexture journey" Venus Urania on Entity, in an attempt to capture a fitting sonic environment for the event. The same year, Erratic released Presence on Mirakel Musik; a 50-minute composition of "richly textured" field recordings intended to accompany the listener to sleep. Erratic has also collaborated with music artists Andrey Kiritchenko and fellow Belgian Lina, visual artists Jesper Bentzen and the Farbrausch demogroup, and has released Activation Fields on Entity (2004), The Invisible Landscape on Mystery Sea (2006), and contributed to compilations on Con-v, AntmanuvMicro and Soulseek Records.

=== Duncan Avoid ===
Duncan Avoid was a collaboration between Entity-founders Jan Robbe and Nico de Gols. The project's goal was to defy musical genre as well as technical limitations. Their first album Cybernetics was released in 2003 on Enough Records; a concept album concerned with transhumanism and emerging technologies. The album is unique among other releases on the Enough imprint for its extensive use of microtonality and unresolved atmospherics, described by one journalist as "a spacious, complex, and arguably psychoactive menagerie of integrated electronic soundscapes. .... a purely abstruse composition of sonic nomogenetics, synthetic coils and unfurling digital helices, producing from the ether intangible imagery of high technology newly conjoined with anthropomorphic sentience". Cybernetics was followed by appearances on Kirdec's Stadskantoor Zero and d.compose's Analysis EP, for which Duncan Avoid imparted a Cybernetics-esque remix of d.compose's "Thresn 54-231001". Duncan Avoid was also performing throughout Europe at this time, including two shows at the Cabaret Voltaire with Shitmat and Chevron, the 2003 Fuckparade in Berlin, and the 2004 Polymorphik Festival in Liège, Belgium.

In 2004 the duo released their magnum opus Metaphysics on Hive Records. Many have found the album's fusing and traversing of disparate styles difficult to categorize, with one reviewer calling it "so innovative it sounds almost entirely novel, almost totally devoid of obvious influences, to the point of being a new form without a ready frame of reference." Similar sentiments were expressed by others, with descriptions ranging from "punchy breakcore freneticism coiled tightly around endlessly twisted ambience and hectic experimental sound sculpture", to "a gaseous contrail of solar noise and ice particles where ambient breaths of watery melodies get heat-flashed into steam, and software-driven drum programming is savaged by extended processor cycles." Prolific polystylist C-drik and Ukrainian noise artist Kotra provided remixes of "Auditory Arms" and "Parallel Grounds", respectively. Duncan Avoid also lent tracks to Enough Records' Retork compilation and the limited edition FUCK compilation released on Hive. The project has since been put on an indefinite hiatus.
