= Venetian Snares x Daniel Lanois =

Studio album by Venetian Snares x Daniel Lanois
- Released: May 4, 2018
- Length: 33:08
- Label: Timesig/Planet Mu
- Producers: Aaron Funk; Daniel Lanois

Venetian Snares chronology
She Began to Cry Tears of Blood Which Became Little Brick Houses When They Hit the Ground (2018)	Venetian Snares x Daniel Lanois (2018)	Greg Hates Car Culture (2019)

Daniel Lanois chronology
Goodbye to Language (2016)	Venetian Snares x Daniel Lanois (2018)

Venetian Snares x Daniel Lanois is a collaborative album by breakcore musician Aaron Funk (aka Venetian Snares) and guitarist–producer Daniel Lanois released on May 4, 2018, by Timesig.

== Background ==
Lanois discovered Funk's music through the 2005 album Rossz Csillag Alatt Született and was intrigued by his music. Lanois was motivated to reach out to Funk because he realised "he knew something I didn't and I always like to work with people who know how to do something I don't."

Venetian Snares x Daniel Lanois was recorded during three sessions in Lanois' Toronto studio in a largely improvisational style. Lanois said that whilst putting together the album, he and Funk listened through the improvised recordings and looked for "magic sections, made note of them, hooked them up with another magic section and built an arrangement with that process [...] Cut the crap and keep the great." Regarding the creation of the album, Lanois stated that he "really believed when we were making this record that we were pushing the envelope of convention."

In March 2017, Funk announced via Facebook that he and Lanois were working on a collaborative album and would be performing together later in the year. In February 2018, the album name and track listing were announced and the release date was confirmed to be May 4, 2018.

== Critical reception ==
Professional ratings
Aggregate scores
Source	Rating
Metacritic	76/100
Review scores
Source	Rating
AllMusic	4/5 stars
Drowned in Sound	5/10
Exclaim!	8/10
MusicOMH	4/5 stars
Pitchfork	6.9/10
PopMatters	8/10
Tiny Mix Tapes	2/5 stars

Venetian Snares x Daniel Lanois received generally favourable reviews from critics. At Metacritic, which assigns a normalized rating out of 100 to reviews from mainstream publications, the album received an average score of 76, based on ten reviews.

In a positive review for AllMusic, Paul Simpson described the album as "an uneasy but fascinating soundclash, with Funk's modular synthesizers and tumultuous breakbeats offset by Lanois' soothing pedal steel vistas." He praised the track "Mothors Pressroll P131," for containing "the hardest, nastiest breaks Funk has delivered in years" and "Night MXCMPV1 P74" for its "soothing guitar and synths forming a blanket around the scattered yet controlled micro-breaks." The review concludes: "At 33 minutes, the album is an intense but abrupt ride, with both musicians soaring into bold new territories." Daryl Keating of Exclaim! called the album a "beautiful, symbiotic relationship" and praised the album for its mixture of traditional instruments and electronics stating "The woozy pedal steel guitar that Lanois wields seems to be puttering away in the background for a while, but eventually you begin to realize that those unassuming melodies are the driving force behind all the tracks." Andy Beta of Pitchfork praised moments on the album where "humanly impossible rhythms are melded to melodic yet melancholic undercurrents" and concludes "Lanois and Funk demonstrate that even the briefest pause can reveal a more becalmed state of being lying just beneath all the noise and bustle."

Many critics argued that Lanois and Funk's differing styles complemented one another on Venetian Snares x Daniel Lanois. Writing for PopMatters, John Garratt calls the collaboration a "beautifully deadly combination" and notes "Even if Lanois and Funk are seemingly working towards opposite ends, the sonic marriage of the two becomes easier to process with each listening. If you are new to breakbeat, Venetian Snares x Daniel Lanois is more likely to plant a glitch seed in your brain rather than convert you overnight." Ben Devlin of musicOMH gave the album four stars out of five but critiqued its short runtime: "the brevity of Venetian Snares X Daniel Lanois is a tad disappointing, as several of these tracks could have been extended. It is, however, a surprisingly cohesive listen and the sound design is at a typically high standard for both artists. Lanois and Snares are an unorthodox pairing, and the former's fans may have mixed reactions to the latter's noisy beats, but they complement each other well, and what could have been just a niche curiosity is instead a real treat."

However, Tristan Kneschke of Tiny Mix Tapes described the album as "unsavoury" arguing that "each artist's style comes from a different planet, and those styles don't mix well when thrown together." He goes on to write that the resulting sound is "schizophrenic" and concludes "Their pairing is like eating apple pie topped with cheddar cheese: some are sure to find enjoyment in the combination, but for the rest of us, these pairings are best avoided." Philippa Nicole Barr of Drowned in Sound opines that "rather than [the album] being a true collaborative effort [...] they have both brought together their own sounds and layered them on top of one another" and that "the moments of unity sound accidental and haphazard". Similarly, Andy Beta of Pitchfork writes of the album "Given their drastically different approaches to space, the album doesn't quite balance out as a true collaboration", however, he argues that "as an overlay of their sensibilities, it still provides for some striking moments".

=== Year-end lists ===
Publication	Accolade	Rank	Ref.
Exclaim!	Top 10 Dance and Electronic Albums of 2018	8	

== Track listing ==
Track listing adapted from Apple Music.

No.	Title	Length
1.	"Mag11 P82"	4:06
2.	"Hpshk5050 P127"	2:51
3.	"United P92"	9:33
4.	"Bernard Revisit P81"	2:13
5.	"Best P54"	3:38
6.	"Mothors Pressroll P131"	3:36
7.	"Night Mxcmpv1 P74"	5:01
8.	"Ophelius 1Stp118"	2:10

Pre-order bonus disc

No.	Title	Length
1.	"Night GHP133"	5:29
2.	"Scientist E2P49"	3:37
3.	"Mag11 P136"	3:22
4.	"Mothors GHV4P14"	4:02
5.	"Steambird P80"	3:53
6.	"Joe P11LC2P146"	2:33
7.	"Mag11 P65"	4:32
8.	"Cat Song P53"	2:43
