= Glade Festival =

- Genre: Electronic music, dance music, intelligent dance music, psytrance, ambient music, breakbeat, breakcore, techno, house, dubstep, world music
- Locations: Houghton Hall, England
- Years active: 2004–2012
- Attendance: 5,500
- Website: gladefestival.com

Glade Festival was an electronic dance music festival, founded by Nick Ladd and Ans Guise, which originally started out as Glastonbury Festival's Glade Stage, which was established by Luke Piper and Mark Parsons who also became founding partners in Glade Festival itself. Exeter breakbeat promoter Biff Mitchell also played an important role in the event's development. The annual festival took place for the first time over four days in the summer of 2004, attracting 22,500 people by 2007. The festival's home for the first five years was the Wasing Estate, in Berkshire. In 2009 it was held in Winchester, and in 2011 and 2012 its location was at Houghton Hall in Norfolk. The festival was cancelled in 2013, it did not reappear as was planned in 2014, however the Glade Stage at the main Glastonbury festival continues.

Glade Festival originated from the Glade arena started at Glastonbury featuring electronic artists including Aphex Twin, Squarepusher, Hallucinogen and Hybrid.

== History ==
=== 2004 to 2006 ===
The first UK festival to feature Psychedelic Trance and Breakbeat as main stages, and with headliners Squarepusher, Aphex Twin, Hallucinogen and Stanton Warriors, Glade sold out in its first year attracting over 6500 people. In 2005, the licence was extended to 9500 tickets, which sold out in 8 hours, making it the fastest selling festival in the UK that year. Glade was also the first UK festival to host a stage dedicated to dubstep and was responsible for bringing many now successful dance acts and DJs into the public eye. By 2006, the event had sold out 14,500 tickets without even releasing the artists line up – a phenomenon unheard of outside of Glastonbury Festival. The third Glade is widely regarded as the best UK electronic music festival of its era.

=== 2007 ===
In 2007, the event was held at the Wasing Estate for the fourth consecutive year, 20–22 July. The licence application suffered an early setback when it was dismissed on a technicality. The licence application then suffered further setbacks resulting in a delay in tickets going on sale, until on 18 April 2007 the mailing list announced "The Glade Festival is on for 2007... 100% licensed by those wonderful people in power!"

The festival had formerly featured nine main dance tents and stages: Main "Glade" Dance Tent (major artists), Breaksday (UK breakbeat), idSpiral (chillout and non-musical acts), Liquid Connective (psy-trance), Origin (psy-trance), Sancho Panza (house), Pussy Parlure (soul, salsa, R&B, reggae and world), Overkill (formerly the LittleBig tent, featuring breakcore, gabber techno and mash-up) and the Rabbit Hole (secret club, party tent, jam tent by Arabian Tent Company). However, the main dance tent was scrapped for the 2007 event and replaced by a new open air stage for predominantly live acts and two smaller tents comprising a techno tent (Vapor) and the Roots Tent, which is themed on the origins of dance music. There was also a new space called the Nectar Temple, comprising visionary and performance arts from a Californian arts collective.

The festival was hit by severe flooding that threatened to close the festival; local roads and villages were flooded and closed. The Overkill tent was initially cancelled on the first day of the festival due to the stage being submerged under 2 ft of water. However, organiser Ned Beckett described in some detail how the crew dug trenches and built dams to salvage the stage: "Little diggers turned up, water pumps were suddenly sucking all the water out of our dance floor, and the sound crew rebuilt their PA on the stage." It was a herculean effort by the crew to keep the event going and in spite of the weather the event went well.

=== 2008 ===
The 2008 event, held during 18–20 July, underwent some consolidation in the light of "festival fatigue" in the UK festivals market as a whole, caused by a combination of poor weather in the previous year, cheaper festivals in continental Europe and too many UK festivals chasing fewer customers during a period of economic downturn.

This consolidation took the form of a reduction in capacity from 18,000 to 12,000 and the loss of some of the additional venues that were added to the 2007 event – namely the Roots Stage, the Algorithm arts space and the Nectar arts/talks space. Some of the art has been moved to others spaces, such as the inSpiral (formerly ID Spiral) chill-out space. However, the organisers stressed that no advertised performers were cut from any line-ups, nor were there any plans to do so.

Despite this, Glade went on to win 'Best Dance Music Festival' at the 2008 UK Festival awards.

=== 2009 ===
This year's festival took place from 16 to 19 July 2009. Tickets cost £125 for the weekend, and tickets sold out on 14 July.

The location for 2009's festival was confirmed as the Matterley Bowl in Winchester. By moving to this new location, Glade festival has been able to add new stages and mini-villages within the festival hosting a huge variation of acts. Stages and features included in 2009 were the Glade Stage, Vapor (Bloc), Club Tent, Avalon, Carmageddon, Rabbit Hole, Interstella, Come and Play, Pussy Parlure and the Solent Tent. Headlining this year were the electronic duo Underworld, with a UK exclusive live set for Glade festival. Some of the other artists appearing include: Booka Shade, Squarepusher, Juan Atkins, Carl Craig, Femi Kuti, Nitin Sawhney, Mutant Clan aka Timo Maas and Santos, Dave Clarke, Finley Quaye, Adam Beyer, Freestylers, Filthy Dukes, Annie Nightingale, The Bays feat. Beardyman, The Egg, Venetian Snares, Benga, Rusko, Toddla T, Digital Mystikz, The Qemists, Limewax, Drop The Lime, Sub Focus, Shitmat, Tim Exile, Starkey, Leeroy Thornhill (Ex-Prodigy), Koma & Bones, Japanese Popstars, DJ Zinc, Duran Duran Duran, Kasey Taylor, Antix, The Wrongstar Society DJ Healer Selecta and Kid 606.

In June, Glade Festival officially announced the drum and bass line-up at the festival, with DJs Andy C, Marky, Noisia, Fresh, Cyantific, Phantasy, Mr Nice, Maxxi P alongside MCs Gq, Ic3, Bensta, Script and Johnny G taking over the Vapor Stage.

=== 2010 ===
This year's festival was due to take place 15–18 July. Headlining the festival this year was meant to be Orbital, Simian Mobile Disco and Tricky. However, on 11 May 2010, an official statement announced that Glade festival was cancelled due to the Hampshire Constabulary's announcement that it had raised its policing costs from £29,000 the previous year to £175,000.

=== 2011 ===
Tickets went on sale on 25 January 2011. The festival took place on 10, 11 and 12 June 2011. The headline acts on the Glade stage were: Trentemøller, Adam Beyer, Global Communication and Sub Focus. The location was Houghton Hall in Norfolk. The festival was smaller with only 5500 tickets being made available.

=== 2012 ===
The Glade festival took place on 14 to 17 June 2012, held again at Houghton Hall in Norfolk. Headline acts included Sven Väth, Stanton Warriors, Essaios and Krafty Kuts.

== Change of site ==
Despite the festival's 2008 acquisition of a five-year licence for the Wasing location, it was revealed on 28 November 2008 that the 2009 event would not take place on the Berkshire estate. The organisers had earlier indicated in an October newsletter that the festival had intended to move to "a more grassroots free party vibe" for the 2009 event, with a move away from big tents and having more open-air venues".

The change of location was explained in detail in a press release on 2 December 2008, as well as through the festival's mailing list, but the location of the new site was not revealed at this stage, other than to say it would be "in the south of England". The organisers blamed the move on "restrictions set by Berkshire Council" and promised "a new and equally lovely site which will allow them to crank it up properly".

Festival director Nick Ladd confirmed on the Ravetalk website on 27 January 2009 that the new venue was at Matterley Bowl, Winchester.

== Featured acts ==
Glade Festival features many acts that are well known in the 'alternative dance' world. Some notable performers include:

- 2004: Timo Maas, Freq Nasty, 808 State, Ceephax, System 7, The Egg, and DJ AFX.
- 2005: Hallucinogen, The Orb, Dreadzone, Squarepusher, AFX, Layo & Bushwacka!, and Sasha.
- 2006 (14–16 July): Autechre, Alabama 3, Phil Hartnoll, Plump DJs, A Guy Called Gerald, Kevin Saunderson, Ceephax, Juno Reactor, Layo & Bushwacka!, Banco de Gaia, Gaudi, Coldcut, Celloman, Hybrid, Krafty Kuts, Bong-Ra, and DJ Zinc.
- 2007 (20–22 July): UNKLE, Andy C, Dreadzone, Richie Hawtin, Trentemøller, Sander Kleinenberg, Hybrid, Krafty Kuts, Plump DJs, Shpongle, Venetian Snares, Derrick May, Squarepusher, Digital Mystikz, Four Tet, Dj Healer Selecta and Beardyman.
- 2008 (18–20 July): Jeff Mills, The Orb, Utah Saints, Pendulum, Autechre, Plump DJs, Atomic Hooligan, Vitalic, System 7, and Perfect Stranger.
- 2009 (16–19 July): Underworld, Booka Shade, Squarepusher, Femi Kuti, Adam Beyer, Juan Atkins, Eat Static, and Dave Clarke confirmed as headliners.

== See also ==
- List of electronic music festivals
