= Pinball Number Count =

Series of fantastical animated pinball sequences airing in 1977 on Sesame Street

Pinball Number Count (or Pinball Countdown) is a collective title referring to 11 one-minute animated segments on the children's television series Sesame Street that teach children to count to 12 by following the journey of a pinball through a fanciful pinball machine. These segments are notable for the colorful, imaginative animation as well as the funky soundtrack with vocals by the Pointer Sisters. Pinball Number Count was originally produced in 1976 by Imagination, Inc. in San Francisco, California for the Children's Television Workshop. The segments made their debut on Sesame Street during Season 8 in 1977, and they were shown regularly until Season 33 in 2002.

== Overview ==
The Pinball Number Count segments contain common beginning and ending sequences showing the launch of the pinball into the machine and the exit of the pinball from play, respectively. Between these two sequences is a number-specific animated narrative showing the pinball in play. This middle segment features a scene in which a number of contraptions move the pinball about the interior of the machine, sometimes employing Rube Goldberg–style mechanisms. Each scene begins with the ball following ramps and hitting some bumpers; then various features belonging to a theme specific to the number, often including humanoid or animal figures, appear. The pinball then exits this area to the end sequence, where it leaves play.

== Opening sequence ==
At the beginning of each segment, a number with a group of stars circling around it is shown accompanied by a voice whispering the current number.

== Music ==
Music for Pinball Number Count was composed by Walt Kraemer and arranged by Ed Bogas. Performers included the Pointer Sisters on vocals and assorted San Francisco Bay Area jazz musicians, including George Marsh on drums, Mel Martin on saxophone and Andy Narell on steel drums.

The arrangements reflect musical idioms commonly found in 1970s urban culture, predominantly funk and jazz, though other styles including Caribbean music are also represented. The number-specific middle sections contain one of three different improvised instrumental solos over a basic progression, featuring steel drums (numbers 2, 4, 9 and 12) electric guitar (3, 8 and 11) and soprano saxophone (5, 6, 7 and 10).

Consistent with an abbreviated jazz structure, a prearranged head and turnaround / coda are played during the common starting and ending animation sequences. The vocals work in similar fashion with the featured numeral spoken, sung and shouted during the middle section and a return to the arranged counting at the end.

The song employs complex rhythms, changing time signatures frequently between 4/4, 3/4 and 5/4 during the opening and closing segments, around a rhythmically straightforward 4/4 middle improvisation section.

== Visuals ==
Animation for the segments was directed by Jeff Hale and recalls contemporary psychedelic and pop art styles, typified by the ornate pinball bumpers, colorful geometrical motifs and whimsical themes and devices inside the machine.

== List of segments ==
Despite the lyrics' counting from one to twelve, Pinball Number Count did not feature a segment for the number 1.

=== 2: A Day at the Carnival ===
The ball finds its way through carnival and amusement park-themed obstacles—riding a roller coaster, a ferris wheel, and some little hanging airplanes until being dropped into a giant clown head's mouth that leads to a haunted house ride. It passes by a ghost, a skeleton, and a bat (which zooms toward the camera), before exiting another giant clown head's mouth. Now it runs over a balloon man, gets rejected from a ball toss game by a windmill, then is bounced into the hole by two bumper cars.

Solo: Steel Drum

=== 3: Circus Capers ===
The ball rolls through circus attractions. It is shot from a blue cannon (flowers pop out), bounces off a net held by two clowns, and handed off by a ringmaster by his hat, to a juggling ape who tosses it to a lion tamer and her lion, who throws it through the hoop. The ball then gets tossed and it lands on the nose of a blue seal and is launched from a seesaw by a hippopotamus to a pink elephant that runs it into the hole. Number 3 is the only segment that features four flashes of its number instead of three.

Solo: Electric Guitar

=== 4: FORE! ===
The ball rolls down a hill and is hit by a golfer. It crashes into a duck and it spins. The golfer gives the ball another shot. It then runs over another golfer with a flag with the number 4 written on it standing next to a hole before entering a rabbit burrow (causing six purple rabbits to pop out of their holes). The golfer makes the last shot. The ball bumps off the bottoms of four trees before rolling into another tree where a squirrel drops it into the hole.

Solo: Steel Drum

=== 5: The Only Way to Travel ===
The ball rolls down a green ramp and is kicked by a flagman into the backseat of a car which enters a tunnel with the number 5, from which emerges a bicycle with the ball in its basket. The ball is then pushed by a big red train, then a magnet attached to a plane picks it up and drops it into a tugboat, causing it to sink. After the ball is shot out of a big fat volcano, it is caught by a blimp, which drops it into the hole.

Solo: Saxophone

=== 6: Down on the Farm ===
The ball rolls down a ramp attached to a barn and is kicked by a donkey past six sheep before rolling into the bottom of a haystack. It emerges from the top and is tossed by a goat dressed like a farmer. Then it rolls under a group of five chickens and is laid like an egg under the sixth chicken (The mother hen) who then pushes it away with its beak. The ball then rolls into a doghouse and is chased out by the dog inside. It then chases a pig into a barn where the goat farmer emerges from behind it carrying the ball in a wheelbarrow and drops it into the hole.

Solo: Saxophone

=== 7: Sightseeing Part 1: World Tour ===
The ball slides down from the roofs of the Taj Mahal and under a snake charmer whose pet snake is startled awake and pushes the ball out from under him with its tail. The ball rolls under the Sphinx (the statue turns its head to see the ball as it rolls behind him), and into the pyramid of Khafre. The ball leaves the pyramid from the top and bounces off two onion domes before being kicked into the air by a hopak dancer. A Swiss-mountain climber blowing an alphorn swings to the right to catch the ball. Then he swings to the left and blows the ball loose. The ball lands on a dark blue bull in a ring, bounces off him and crashes into a matador. It then gets rejected by a Kinderdijk windmill, runs over a constable police officer and enters a sentry box which causes two guards in bearskin caps to pop out of their holes. Number 7 is the only segment where the ball doesn't enter a hole at the end.

Solo: Saxophone

=== 8: Forest Follies ===
Many forest animals pass the ball around. A unicycling teddy bear, a giant frog, a monkey, a pelican, a kangaroo, a big gopher, a second brown bear in a tree, two more unicycling brown bears and a unicycling raccoon who drops it into the hole. Number 8 is the only segment where the ball doesn't enter the scene immediately.

Solo: Electric Guitar

=== 9: Play Ball! ===
The ball rolls down a ramp and encounters some baseball players, runs over a hot-dog vendor, and is chased under the bleachers and dropped into the hole by a dog. Number 9 only features two flashes of its number instead of three.

Solo: Steel Drum

=== 10: Medieval Times ===
The ball slides down a ramp attached to a castle wall and a second ball is launched from a catapult by a jester and a knight into the mouth of a dragon who spits it out with fire, sending the ball crashing into another knight. It then runs into a giant who pushes the ball on with its spiky flail. The ball then rolls into a castle through the doorway as the bridge lowers, then it is shot from a cannon into the cave, and splashes into a witch's cauldron; the splash knocks down the witch. The dragon then emerges from the cauldron with the ball in its mouth and drops it into the hole.

Solo: Saxophone

=== 11: Wild Things in the Jungle ===
Many jungle animals pass the ball around, including a monkey, an elephant, a giraffe, a jaguar, a rhinoceros, a zebra, a lion, a pink bunny, a tiger and a giant sized gorilla that flicks it into the hole.

Solo: Electric Guitar

=== 12: Sightseeing Part 2: USA ===
The ball goes sightseeing through American landmarks, including the Statue of Liberty, the Washington Monument, Mount Rushmore, the Grand Canyon, Old Faithful, a Sequoia, the Golden Gate Bridge and a San Francisco Trolley, which drops it into the hole.

Solo: Steel Drum

== Cover versions, parodies, and online analysis ==
Pinball Number Count has been covered and remixed by a number of artists. One such version, done with the cooperation of Sesame Workshop, was released under the DJ Food name by Ninja Tune Records on a 12" EP and the Zen TV DVD. Other versions have been performed by Venetian Snares (on the Infolepsy EP), Wicked Hemlocks, Maylee Todd (on Escapology), the Postmarks, and an instrumental version by Big Organ Trio. The refrain was prominently featured in Many Moons by Janelle Monáe. It was covered by Brandon Williams on his 2014 album XII featuring Dames Brown & Nicholas Payton.

The Family Guy episode "The Father, the Son, and the Holy Fonz" used a plastic bubble-encased Stewie as the pinball in a parody of the segment. The vocal rhythm is referenced in the film Half Nelson, where Ryan Gosling's character Dan Dunne mumbles the numbers in the same fashion.

American musician and YouTuber Charles Cornell did a 16-minute video analysis of the song, entitled "This Song Teaches Counting But Is INSANELY Hard To Count", exploring the music theory behind the song.

== Online game ==
In 2019, sesamestreet.org released an online pinball game based on the animated segments.
