= My Downfall (Original Soundtrack) =

Studio album by Venetian Snares
- Released: October 1, 2007
- Genres: Classical music, breakcore
- Length: 44:46
- Label: Planet Mu
- Producer: Aaron Funk

Venetian Snares chronology
| Sabbath Dubs (2007) | My Downfall (2007) | Detrimentalist (2008) |

Professional ratings
Review scores
| Source | Rating |
|---|---|
| Rockfeedback | 4/5 stars |
| Sputnikmusic | 3/5 stars |

My Downfall (Original Soundtrack) is the fifteenth studio album by breakcore artist Venetian Snares. The title is in reference not to an actual soundtrack but rather the soundtrack to Aaron Funk's "downfall". It is said to be a follow-up to the 2005 album Rossz Csillag Alatt Született, as hinted by the reappearing Hungarian song titles. Aaron was quoted as saying, "This album has nothing to do with dubstep and very little to do with breakcore." It, like the album it is said to follow, consists largely of classical compositions. However, unlike said album, it features very little in the way of drumbeats, instead focusing on an atmospheric sound made by the classical instruments.

== Track listing ==
1. "Colorless" – 2:26
2. "The Hopeless Pursuit of Remission" – 4:22
3. "Holló Utca 2" – 1:54
4. "Room 379" – 1:49
5. "Integraation" – 7:00
6. "Holló Utca 5" – 2:16
7. "Holló Utca 3" – 1:14
8. "My Half" – 7:03
9. "Holló Utca 4" – 1:41
10. "My Crutch" – 5:13
11. "I'm Sorry I Failed You" – 2:08
12. "Picturesque Pit" – 2:13
13. "If I Could Say I Love You" – 4:18
14. "Mentioning It" – 1:09
