= Infolepsy =

Infolepsy EP

EP by Venetian Snares
- Released: November 15, 2004
- Genre: Breakcore
- Length: 21:10
- Label: Coredump Records
- Producer: Aaron Funk

Venetian Snares chronology
Huge Chrome Cylinder Box Unfolding (2004)	Infolepsy EP (2004)	Winnipeg Is a Frozen Shithole (2005)

The Infolepsy EP was released in 2004 on Coredump Records by breakcore artist Venetian Snares. It consists of 5 tracks, three on the A side and two on the B side. It was also released on CD. The first track samples almost exclusively from the Sesame Street segment Pinball Number Count, while the second track, "Where's Bill?", samples heavily from the Quentin Tarantino film Kill Bill. The track "Americanized" samples a pamphlet by conspiracy theorist Francis E. Dec from a spoken word recording made of it by Boyd "Doc" Britton (now "Doc on the Roq" for the radio station KROQ-FM). Punishing2004 is a remix of Punishing The Atoms from printf("shiver in eternal darkness/n");.

The EP was reissued on May 26, 2013, as a digital download on Bandcamp.

== Track listing ==
1. "Twelve" – 2:20
2. "Where's Bill?" – 5:08
3. "Absolute Smakatrosmic" – 3:31
4. "Americanized" – 5:39
5. "Punishing2004" – 4:22 featuring MC SKM

=== 2013 reissue bonus track ===
6. "Ibanchivapalk" – 2:55
