= A Giant Alien Force More Violent & Sick Than Anything You Can Imagine =

Single by Venetian Snares
- Released: October 30, 2002
- Genre: Breakcore
- Length: 15:34
- Label: Hymen
- Producer: Venetian Snares

Venetian Snares singles chronology
"2370894" (2002)	"A Giant Alien Force More Violent & Sick Than Anything You Can Imagine" (2002)	"Nymphomatriarch" (2003)

Professional ratings
Review scores
Source	Rating
Cyclic Defrost	link
Pitchfork Media	(8.5/10) 1/23/2003 link

A Giant Alien Force More Violent & Sick Than Anything You Can Imagine is a 2002 Venetian Snares single released on the Hymen label, consisting of one fifteen-and-a-half minute long experimental breakcore track (the track happens to have a 15/4 time signature). The packaging consists of a jewellery box-style case containing a 3" CD and a working television-shaped View-Master with a slide show of artwork from Hymen label owner Stefan Alt, AKA Salt. The single was limited to small number of copies and sold out within a week after its release.

== Track listing ==
1. "A Giant Alien Force More Violent & Sick Than Anything You Can Imagine" – 15:34
