= My Love Is a Bulldozer =

Studio album by Venetian Snares
- Released: June 16, 2014
- Genres: Breakcore, modern classical
- Length: 53:47
- Label: Planet Mu
- Producer: Aaron Funk

Venetian Snares chronology
Fool the Detector (2012)	My Love Is a Bulldozer (2014)	Your Face (2015)

Professional ratings
Aggregate scores
Source	Rating
Metacritic	65/100
Review scores
Source	Rating
Clash	8/10
Exclaim!	8/10
The Line of Best Fit	6/10
Record Collector	2/5 stars
Resident Advisor	4/5
Tiny Mix Tapes	2.5/5 stars
Uncut	7/10

My Love Is a Bulldozer is the twentieth studio album by breakcore artist Venetian Snares released on June 16, 2014.

== Track listing ==
1. "10th Circle of Winnipeg" – 7:00
2. "Deleted Poems" – 3:13
3. "1000 Years" – 6:13
4. "Your Smiling Face" – 3:05
5. "Amazon" – 4:05
6. "My Love Is a Bulldozer" – 5:08
7. "She Runs" – 7:05
8. "8am Union Station" – 1:41
9. "Shaky Sometimes" – 3:32
10. "Too Far Across" – 2:46
11. "Dear Poet" – 6:47
12. "Your Blanket" – 3:07
