= Thinning (disambiguation) =

- Thinning (ecology)
- Thinning (morphology)
- "The Thinning" (movie)
- In engineering, a reduction in viscosity

== See also ==
- Thinner (disambiguation)
