= United Acid Emirates =

Studio album by Ceephax Acid Crew
- Released: January 25, 2010
- Recorded: 2007–2010
- Genre: Acid house
- Length: 56:11 (CD); 50:11 (vinyl)
- Label: Planet Mu
- Producer: Andy Jenkinson

Ceephax Acid Crew chronology
Ceeland (2009)	United Acid Emirates (2010)	Psychtapolis (2010)

Professional ratings
Review scores
Source	Rating
Allmusic	link

United Acid Emirates is an acid house album by Ceephax Acid Crew, released in 2010 on Planet Mu. The Roland TB-303 synthesizer is prominently featured on the album's cover art.

== Track listing ==
=== CD release ===
1. Cedric's Sonnet – 3:07
2. Castilian – 4:54 †
3. New River Company – 2:23
4. Commuter – 5:31
5. Glocker – 1:06 †
6. Life Funk – 5:21
7. Sidney's Sizzler – 5:21
8. Trabzonspor – 3:02
9. Topaz – 2:54
10. Emotinium II – 8:16
11. The Celebrity – 3:57
12. Denizlispor – 2:03
13. Arcadian (Castilian II) – 4:05
14. Royal Lounge – 4:11

† indicates CD-only track

=== Vinyl release ===
==== Side one ====
1. Cedric's Sonnet – 3:07
2. Commuter – 5:31
3. New River Company – 2:23

==== Side two ====
1. Life Funk – 5:21
2. Sidney's Sizzler – 5:21
3. Trabzonspor – 3:02

==== Side three ====
1. Topaz – 2:54
2. Emotinium II – 8:16
3. The Celebrity – 3:57

==== Side four ====
1. Arcadian (Castilian II) – 4:05
2. Royal Lounge – 4:11
3. Denizlispor – 2:03
