= Ital Tek =

English electronic musician

Ital Tek is the stage name of Alan David Myson, an English electronic musician from Brighton. As Ital Tek, he has released eight albums on the Planet Mu label.

Myson first began performing as Ital Tek in 2006, recording for the label Net Lab. Ital Tek's first release for Planet Mu was a 12" single released in 2007; the Cyclical album followed in 2008. His 2016 release Hollowed was described by Clash Music as "intelligent dubstep".

== Discography ==
- Cyclical (Planet Mu, 2008)
- Midnight Colour (Planet Mu, 2010)
- Nebula Dance (Planet Mu, 2012)
- Control (Planet Mu, 2013)
- Hollowed (Planet Mu, 2016)
- Bodied (Planet Mu, 2018)
- Outland (Planet Mu, 2020)
- Timeproof (Planet Mu, 2023)
- Mind Abandon (Planet Mu, 2026)
