= Cakey =

Cakey may refer to:

- Paigey Cakey, an English MC, singer and actress
- Cakey (Gabby's Dollhouse), a fictional character
- Cakey (Diary of a Wimpy Kid), a fictional character
- Cakey, a Cornish dialect word
- "Cakey", a song from 1961 (Last Step album)
