= My So-Called Life (Venetian Snares album) =

Studio album by Venetian Snares
- Released: August 24, 2010
- Genre: Breakcore
- Label: Planet Mu
- Producer: Aaron Funk

Venetian Snares chronology
Filth (2009)	My So-Called Life (2010)	Cubist Reggae (2011)

My So-Called Life is the eighteenth studio album by Venetian Snares (Aaron Funk). It is a collection of tracks each made in a matter of days, which Funk considers more of "a collection of short stories than a novel... diary entries." It was the first release on Funk's new record label, Timesig, but was distributed through Planet Mu. The cover artwork entitled "Második Galamb" was painted by Christopher Umana.

== Track listing ==
All tracks are written by Venetian Snares.

No.	Title	Length
1.	"Posers and Camera Phones"	5:19
2.	"Cadaverous"	4:20
3.	"Aaron 2"	5:00
4.	"Who Wants Cake?"	4:46
5.	"Welfare Wednesday"	4:03
6.	"Ultraviolent Junglist"	5:50
7.	"Goodbye9/Hello10"	4:46
8.	"Sound Burglar"	4:34
9.	"Hajnal2"	4:54
10.	"My So-Called Life"	6:29

"Hajnal2" is a remix of Venetian Snares' earlier track, "Hajnal" from Rossz csillag alatt született.

== Samples ==
- "Posers and Camera Phones" samples D12's "Fight Music", "Think (About It)" by Lyn Collins and "The Sound of Violence" by Cassius.
- "Cadaverous" samples a clip from The Wire episode "All Prologue".
- "Aaron2" contains samples from the Rankin/Bass holiday film, The Little Drummer Boy.
- "Who Wants Cake?" samples Depeche Mode's "I Feel You", as well as numerous clips from the unaired Strangers with Candy pilot. The name is shared with the fourth episode of Strangers with Candy.
- "Ultraviolent Junglist" contains samples of the independent professional wrestler John Zandig.
- "Sound Burglar" samples "C'mon Wit Da Get Down" by Artifacts.
