= Outland (Ital Tek album) =

Studio album by Ital Tek
- Released: 1 May 2020
- Length: 43:23
- Label: Planet Mu

Ital Tek chronology
Bodied (2018)	Outland (2020)

Outland is the seventh studio album by English electronic musician Ital Tek. It was released on 1 May 2020 under Planet Mu.

== Release ==
On 5 March 2020, the first single "Deadhead" was released. The second single "Leaving the Grid" was released on 17 April 2020.

Professional ratings
Review scores
Source	Rating
AllMusic	3.5/5 stars
Beats Per Minute	81%
Crack Magazine	6/10
Loud and Quiet	8/10

== Track listing ==
Outland track listing
No.	Title	Length
1.	"Chamber Music"	5:31
2.	"Open Heart"	5:47
3.	"Deadhead"	4:05
4.	"Reverie"	2:43
5.	"Bladed Terrain"	4:09
6.	"Diamond Child"	5:34
7.	"Angel in Ruin"	2:58
8.	"Leaving the Grid"	3:56
9.	"Endless"	4:13
10.	"Oblivion Theme"	4:27
