= Your Face =

Your Face may refer to:

- Your Face (film), a 1987 animated short film by Bill Plympton
- Your Face (EP), a 2015 EP by Venetian Snares
- Your Face (song), a 2023 song by Wisp
- Your Face, a song by Pepper from the album No Shame
