= Drumcorps =

- Performing at the 2011 Glade Festival

Background information
- Born: Aaron Spectre
- Origin: Berlin, Germany
- Genres: Extreme metal; breakcore; jungle; grindcore
- Years active: 2005–present
- Labels: Ad Noiseam Records, Mashed Youths Records, Morning Under Leaves
- Website: https://drumcorps.co

Drumcorps (stylized in all lowercase) is the metal/breakcore musical project of American musician Aaron Spectre. He is currently based in Amsterdam, Netherlands.

Spectre was born and raised in rural Massachusetts. He began Drumcorps after moving to Berlin to branch out creatively. He describes Drumcorps's sound as "solid songwriting mixed with an upfront intensity, human heart & soul mixed with machine precision". In 2007, Grist won the Sound Art Award at Austria's Ars Electronica.

In 2015, Spectre recorded with drummer Igor Cavalera (of Sepultura, Soulwax, Cavalera Conspiracy, and Mixhell) for his album Falling Forward.

== Discography ==
=== As Drumcorps ===
==== Albums ====
- Grist (2006)
- Lost Tracks (2007)
- Falling Forward (2015)
- Creatures (2022)
- Night Ride (2023)
- For Everything (2025)
- Breakdown (2026)

==== EPs ====
- Heartstrong (2012)
- Jungle Boots (2016)
- Building The Panopticon (2016)
- Roots We Seek (2018)
- Better Days (2021)
- For the Living (2021)

=== As Aaron Spectre ===
==== Albums ====
- Lost Tracks (2012)

==== Singles and EPs ====
- Ocean (2005)
- Amen, Punk (2005)
- Say More Fire (2009)
- Building the Panopticon (2016)
- The Quickening (2020)
- Creating the Future (2020)
- Extraterrestrial (2020)
