= My So-Called Life (disambiguation) =

My So-Called Life is a 1990s American television series.

My So-Called Life may also refer to:

- My So-Called Life (From Zero album)
- My So-Called Life (Venetian Snares album)

== See also ==
- My So Called Wife, originally promoted name for the American television series Imposters
- "So Called Life", a 2021 single by Three Days Grace
