= Metaphysics (disambiguation) =

Metaphysics is a branch of philosophy concerned with the fundamental nature of being and the world.

Metaphysics may also refer to:

- Metaphysical art, a style of painting created by Giorgio de Chirico
- Metaphysical poets, a type of poetry in 17th-century England
- Metaphysics (Aristotle), one of the principal works of Aristotle
- Metaphysics, Herbert Schwamborn, Zimbabwean rapper and producer
- Metaphysics: The Lost Atlantic Album, a 1965 album by Hasaan Ibn Ali
- Metaphysics (Duncan Avoid album), a 2004 album
- Metaphysis, a growing area of a bone
- Another term for the supernatural or for New Age beliefs
