= Bodied (album) =

Studio album by Ital Tek
- Released: 7 September 2018
- Genre: Electronic
- Length: 53:52
- Label: Planet Mu

Ital Tek chronology
Hollowed (2016)	Bodied (2018)	Outland (2020)

Professional ratings
Aggregate scores
Source	Rating
AnyDecentMusic?	7.4/10
Metacritic	77/100
Review scores
Source	Rating
AllMusic	3.5/5 stars
Exclaim!	8/10
The Line of Best Fit	9/10

Bodied is the sixth studio album by English electronic musician Ital Tek. It was released on 7 September 2018, under Planet Mu.

== Critical reception ==
Bodied was met with "generally favorable" reviews from critics. At Metacritic, which assigns a weighted average rating out of 100 to reviews from mainstream publications, this release received an average score of 77, based on 7 reviews. Aggregator Album of the Year gave the release a 79 out of 100 based on a critical consensus of 5 reviews.

=== Accolades ===
Accolades for
Publication	Accolade	Rank
DJ Mag	DJ Mag's Top 50 Albums of 2018	36
PopMatters	PopMatters' Top 70 Albums of 2018	35
PopMatters	PopMatters' Top 25 Electronic Albums of 2018	8

== Track listing ==
Bodied track listing
No.	Title	Length
1.	"Adrift"	3:30
2.	"Become Real"	5:00
3.	"Cipher"	5:06
4.	"Lithic"	3:33
5.	"Isolation Waves"	1:32
6.	"Vanta"	4:56
7.	"Across Time"	6:14
8.	"Hymnal"	4:27
9.	"Blood Rain"	3:50
10.	"Prima"	4:12
11.	"Fragility"	1:35
12.	"Bodied"	4:43
13.	"The Circle Is Complete"	5:15
