= Traditional Synthesizer Music =

Studio album by Venetian Snares
- Released: February 19, 2016
- Recorded: 2014
- Genres: Breakcore, IDM
- Length: 43:57
- Label: Planet Mu
- Producer: Aaron Funk

Venetian Snares chronology
Thank You for Your Consideration (2015)	Traditional Synthesizer Music (2016)	She Began to Cry Tears of Blood Which Became Little Brick Houses When They Hit the Ground (2018)

Traditional Synthesizer Music is the twenty-second studio album by Canadian electronic musician Venetian Snares, announced December 17, 2015, and released February 19, 2016, on Planet Mu records. Unlike other albums by Venetian Snares, this album was composed and live recorded entirely on modular synthesizer equipment.

== Critical reception ==
Professional ratings
Aggregate scores
Source	Rating
Metacritic	76/100
Review scores
Source	Rating
AllMusic	4.5/5 stars
Clash	7/10
Drowned in Sound	8/10
Exclaim!	9/10
Tom Hull	A−
Pitchfork	7.4/10
Resident Advisor	3.3/5
Sputnikmusic	4/5
Tiny Mix Tapes	3/5 stars
Uncut	4/5 stars

At Metacritic, which assigns a weighted average score out of 100 to reviews from mainstream critics, Traditional Synthesizer Music received an average score of 76% based on 11 reviews, indicating "generally favorable reviews". AllMusic listed the album as one of their Favorite Electronic Albums of 2016, describing it as "a sharp, thrilling experience, and easily one of Funk's most focused works".

PopMatters placed it at number 52 on the "70 Best Albums of 2016" list.

== Track listing ==
All tracks are written by Aaron Funk.

No.	Title	Length
1.	"Dreamt Person v3"	1:56
2.	"Everything About You Is Special"	3:46
3.	"Slightly Bent Fork Tong v2"	2:26
4.	"Magnificent Stumble v2"	4:21
5.	"Decembers"	4:03
6.	"Can't Vote for Yourself v1"	4:18
7.	"You and Shayna v1"	3:21
8.	"Goose and Gary v2"	3:09
9.	"Anxattack Boss Level19 v3"	4:55
10.	"She Married a Chess Computer in the End"	3:49
11.	"Health Card10"	3:23
12.	"Paganism Ratchets"	4:30
Total length:		43:57

== Charts ==
Chart (2016)	Peak position
US Heatseekers Albums (Billboard)	16
US Top Dance Albums (Billboard)	6
