= Thank You for Your Consideration =

Studio album by Venetian Snares
- Released: September 8, 2015
- Genre: Breakcore; experimental; IDM
- Length: 56:34
- Label: self-release
- Producer: Aaron Funk

Venetian Snares chronology
Your Face (2015)	Thank You for Your Consideration (2015)	Traditional Synthesizer Music (2016)

Thank You for Your Consideration is the twenty-first studio album by electronic musician Venetian Snares (Aaron Funk), self-released on September 8, 2015, through Venetian Snares' Bandcamp site.

The album came shortly after Funk had made an appeal to his fans to help him out as he was in "very serious financial trouble" (Funk later specified he had been robbed). Within 24 hours, Venetian Snares had every top-selling album on Bandcamp. The title of the album, which was released only about two weeks after the appeal, is a reference to its provenance as a thank you for this financial support.

== Track listing ==
1. "Smersonality" – 4:49
2. "Koopa Cookies" – 3:17
3. "Baked Circuses Funk" – 3:23
4. "Beside the Past by a Lake" – 4:22
5. "Sissy Growl" – 4:25
6. "Sweet & Fruitful" – 3:45
7. "Burgershot" – 4:34
8. "Simpleton" – 3:16
9. "09sept09" – 3:21
10. "Poking Holes" – 4:52
11. "Ötvenöt 3" – 3:28
12. "Accidents in Skyland 2" – 4:24
13. "Thousand Mile Stare" – 6:07
14. "Nestled" – 2:32
