= Hangars Liquides =

French record label

- Founded: 1998
- Founder: La Peste (a.k.a. Laurent Mialon)
- Status: Active
- Genre: Experimental music, hardcore techno, acousmatic music, power electronics, flashcore
- Country of origin: France

Hangars Liquides, also known as HL, is a French electronic label. It was created by La Peste (a.k.a. fr:Laurent Mialon) in 1998. Initially Hangars Liquides was Speedcore-oriented but was quickly categorized as experimental music within the hardcore techno scene. HL quickly gained a very good reputation and has been played around the world in many different music scenes: industrial, noise, techno, acousmatic, hardcore, electronica, ambient and post rock.

Releasing artists such as I:gor and Neurocore from Poland, Senical (a.k.a. DJ choose) from Denmark, Bombardier from the US, Noize Creator from Germany, Venetian Snares from Canada, Jan Robbe from Belgium, and French artists such as Al Zheimer, XKV8, Helius Zhamiq, Fist of Fury, Attila, EPC, La Peste and more, the label became a reference in itself: a lot of electronic music tracks from other labels have been described as having a "Hangars Liquides sound" or "Hangars Liquides style". s Since 2000, the label has released many different genres from acousmatic music to power electronics and flashcore.
Flashcore identifies a style that some of those experimental artists share and a manifesto explains the aim of HL's vision of experimental music.

Hangars Liquides also started to produce multimedia since 2001 when computer graphic artist Djehan Kidd joined the label to produce new media designed especially for the music.

The label has a streaming radio as a way to diffuse its new creations, the creations are also used in virtual reality worlds to produce an immersive gestalt listening experience for the visitors.

== Artistic Directions taken by the label over time ==
After the year 2000, the label's artistic direction became very electroacoustic and acousmatic oriented, with a big influence from the likes of musicians like Bernard Parmegiani and Francois Bayle.

== New media used by the label ==
Since 2007 Hangars Liquides has become a non profit organization, its corporate status is to help "create, produce and diffuse any kind of art" through cutting edge mediums that can be found within the range of software used for mediated realities (Virtual Reality, Augmented Reality), it has become an important content creator for providing immersive audiovisual experiences through Virtual Reality's leading platforms. In 2014 the virtual city of Hangars Liquides that was created by Djehan Kidd on Second Life was featured by the Guardian as "the world's largest cyberpunk city"

== See also ==
- List of record labels
