= Ceerial Port =

Ceerial Port EP

EP by Ceephax Acid Crew
- Released: 2006
- Genre: Acid techno, acid house, tech house

Ceerial Port is an EP by the electronic artist Ceephax Acid Crew. It was released in 2006.

== Track listing ==
1. "Acid Highway" - 1:26
2. "Red DX Acid" - 5:03
3. "Acid Whorl" - 3:22
4. "Acid Causeway" - 5:28
5. "Tough Grugoy Acid" - 3:35
6. "Acid Surf Dream" - 7:39
7. "Woodlice Acid" - 4:32
