= Thinner =

Thinner may refer to:

- Lacquer thinner, a diluent or solvent used in lacquerwork.
- Paint thinner, a diluent or solvent used in painting and decorating.
- Thinner (novel), a 1984 horror novel by Stephen King, written as Richard Bachman
  - Thinner (film), a 1996 horror film based on the novel by Stephen King
- Thinner (netlabel), a German netlabel releasing electronic music
