= Greg Hates Car Culture =

- Cover of the 2019 re-release

EP by Venetian Snares
- Released: 1999
- Genre: Breakcore
- Length: 47:19
- Labels: History of the Future; Timesig
- Producer: Aaron Funk

Venetian Snares chronology
Rorschach Stuffocate (1999)	Greg Hates Car Culture (1999)	printf<"shiver in eternal darkness/n">; (2000)

Greg Hates Car Culture is a breakcore EP released by Venetian Snares in 1999 on Minneapolis-based label History of the Future. It was his first official release and led to him being signed by Planet Mu. Twenty years later, a re-mastered version was re-released with three extra tracks on Timesig, a sublabel of Planet Mu as the twenty-fourth studio album of Venetian Snares. The tracks were originally made using an Amiga 500 and an effects pedal.

== Background ==
Venetian Snares (real name Aaron Funk) grew up in Winnipeg, Canada. He started making music as a child and bought an Amiga 500 in 1992. The Greg Hates Car Culture EP was his first record, released by Minneapolis label History of the Future in 1999. Funk made the album mostly when improvising whilst using his Amiga 500 as a sampler feeding into an effects pedal and recording to DAT. At the time he was working as a delivery driver for a bakery.

The EP begins with "Personal Discourse" which samples Funk calling a dominatrix. The song has an 11/4 time signature. "Fuck a Stranger in the Ass" samples the 1998 Coen brothers film The Big Lebowski. "Like Tooth Decay" was previously released on the 1998 demo tape Subvert!. It has a time signature of 21/16.

Upon hearing the record whilst on tour in the US, Mike Paradinas signed Funk to his record label Planet Mu, which has gone to issue many other Venetian Snares releases. Funk then became an influential artist in the intelligent dance music (IDM) scene. Reflecting at the time of the re-release upon what influenced him when making the record, Funk noted gabber tapes from the Netherlands and going to raves where DJs were playing jungle.

== Re-release ==
The original record became rare since only 500 copies were made. It was sold on Discogs for as much as $90. Funk re-released the EP on his Planet Mu sublabel Timesig in 2019, 20 years after its initial release. All tracks were re-mastered and three bonus tunes were added which had never before appeared on vinyl, namely "Eating America With Pointed Dentures", "Punk Kids" and "Milk".

Funk created new artwork for the re-release by taking photographs of his friend Greg Hanec, who had inspired the title of the EP. Funk commented in an interview that Greg still does hate car culture; he also hates cell-phones and only has internet at work.

== Critical reception ==
Writing in 2016, Exclaim! observed that the EP (like Funk's other early releases) "was all pummelling", but "that said, if you're a fan of gabber, then have at 'em".

When the album was re-released in 2019, the critical reception was favourable. DJ Mag commented "it's incredible how hard these breaks still hit" and praised the bonus track "Milk", calling it "intense gabber". Igloo Magazine enjoyed the "raw energy" and PopMatters stated "Greg Hates Car Culture ultimately stands out for more than being Venetian Snares' first vinyl release; it's the sound of a vital artist throwing ideas on a wall and seeing what stuck".

== Track listing ==
=== Side A ===
No.	Title	Length
1.	"Personal Discourse"	3:52
2.	"Like Tooth Decay"	3:36
3.	"Fuck a Stranger in the Ass"	3:12
4.	"Point Blank"	4:01

=== Side B ===
No.	Title	Length
5.	"Boiled Angel"	4:39
6.	"Cricket Spine Bin"	5:05
7.	"Aqap"	6:02

=== 2019 bonus tracks ===
No.	Title	Length
8.	"Milk"	8:55
9.	"Eating America With Pointed Dentures"	4:43
10.	"Punk Kids"	3:14
