= The Father, the Son, and the Holy Fonz =

- Family Guy episode
- Episode no.: Season 4 Episode 18
- Directed by: James Purdum
- Written by: Danny Smith
- Production code: 4ACX22
- Original air date: December 18, 2005

Guest appearances
- Paula Abdul as herself; Tom Bosley as himself playing Howard Cunningham; Gary Cole as Bill Lumbergh; Charles Durning as Francis Griffin; Sherman Hemsley as himself; Phil LaMarr as Parishioner #2 / Doctor; Sherry Romito as Joanie / Nancy / Young Wife; Marion Ross as herself playing Marion Cunningham; Amir Talai as Hindu Man / Wedding Priest; Fred Tatasciore as Gavin MacLeod; Sarah Utterback as Lindsay Lohan; Wally Wingert

Episode chronology
← Previous "The Fat Guy Strangler"	Next → "Brian Sings and Swings"
- Family Guy season 4

"The Father, the Son, and the Holy Fonz" is the 18th episode of the fourth season of the American animated television series Family Guy. It originally aired on the Fox network in the United States on December 18, 2005. The episode follows Peter's decision to find a new religion for himself. After several failed attempts, he chooses the one man who has always been there for him, Fonzie, and starts the First United Church of the Fonz.

The episode was written by Danny Smith and directed by James Purdum. It received mostly positive reviews from critics for its storyline and many cultural references. According to Nielsen ratings, it was viewed in 8.26 million homes in its original airing in the United States. The episode featured guest performances by Paula Abdul, Tom Bosley, Gary Cole, Charles Durning, Sherman Hemsley, Phil LaMarr, Sherry Romito, Marion Ross, Amir Talai, Fred Tatasciore, Sarah Utterback and Wally Wingert, along with several recurring guest voice actors for the series.

== Plot ==
Peter's devout Catholic father, Francis, visits Quahog. Upon arrival, he insists that Stewie be baptized as a Catholic. After visiting a church with Peter and Stewie, Francis is informed that the holy water is tainted and he will have to wait. Francis is in disbelief and baptizes Stewie himself with the contaminated water. Stewie soon becomes unwell and is informed by a doctor that he must be quarantined and kept in a germ-free environment until his immune system recovers. Lois discovers that Francis coaxed Peter into having Stewie baptized without her knowledge and tells Peter to choose his own religious beliefs. Peter initially converts to Mormonism to take advantage of polygamy but then discovers that Mormons cannot drink alcohol. He then tries Jehovah's Witnesses and attempts door-to-door preaching. However, when he finds someone who is actually interested in hearing what he has to say, he realizes he has no idea what to teach them. As a last resort, Peter tries Hinduism but gets himself kicked out after tackling the guru to the floor, believing the red dot on his head to be a laser spot from a sniper rifle. Unable to find a religion suited to him, Peter decides to create his own religion, based on Happy Days, calling his newly founded church the "First United Church of the Fonz".

To the Griffins' (mainly Lois') surprise, many people turn up for the first worship service, much to the annoyance of atheist Brian, who disapproves of Peter being a religious leader, and Francis, who rejects the Church of the Fonz as not "real religion". Brian and Francis join forces to find a way to deter people from worshiping the Fonz. Three actors, serving as representatives from other religions, show up in quick succession to the second service of the Church of the Fonz. The first, Sherman Hemsley, informs people that he has formed the Church of George Jefferson (from All in the Family and The Jeffersons) and a good portion of the congregation leaves with him. The second person is Gavin MacLeod, who claims to have created the Church of Captain Stubing (from The Love Boat) and another chunk of the congregation leaves with him. The third person is Kirk Cameron and Peter assumes that Cameron is there to announce the formation of the Church of Mike Seaver (Cameron's character on Growing Pains), but Cameron says he's there to convert people to Christianity and the remainder of the congregation leaves with him. Back at home, Lois comforts Peter, who is upset at the failure of his Church, by telling him that the values he was preaching were noble, and if he inspired even one person to embrace them, it was worthwhile, but Peter highly doubts it and converts back to Christianity. The scene shifts to Francis, who is looking at a picture of the Fonz. He puts it down on a table, gets on his knees as if to pray, and claps to the beat of "Rock Around the Clock" as the episode ends.

== Production ==
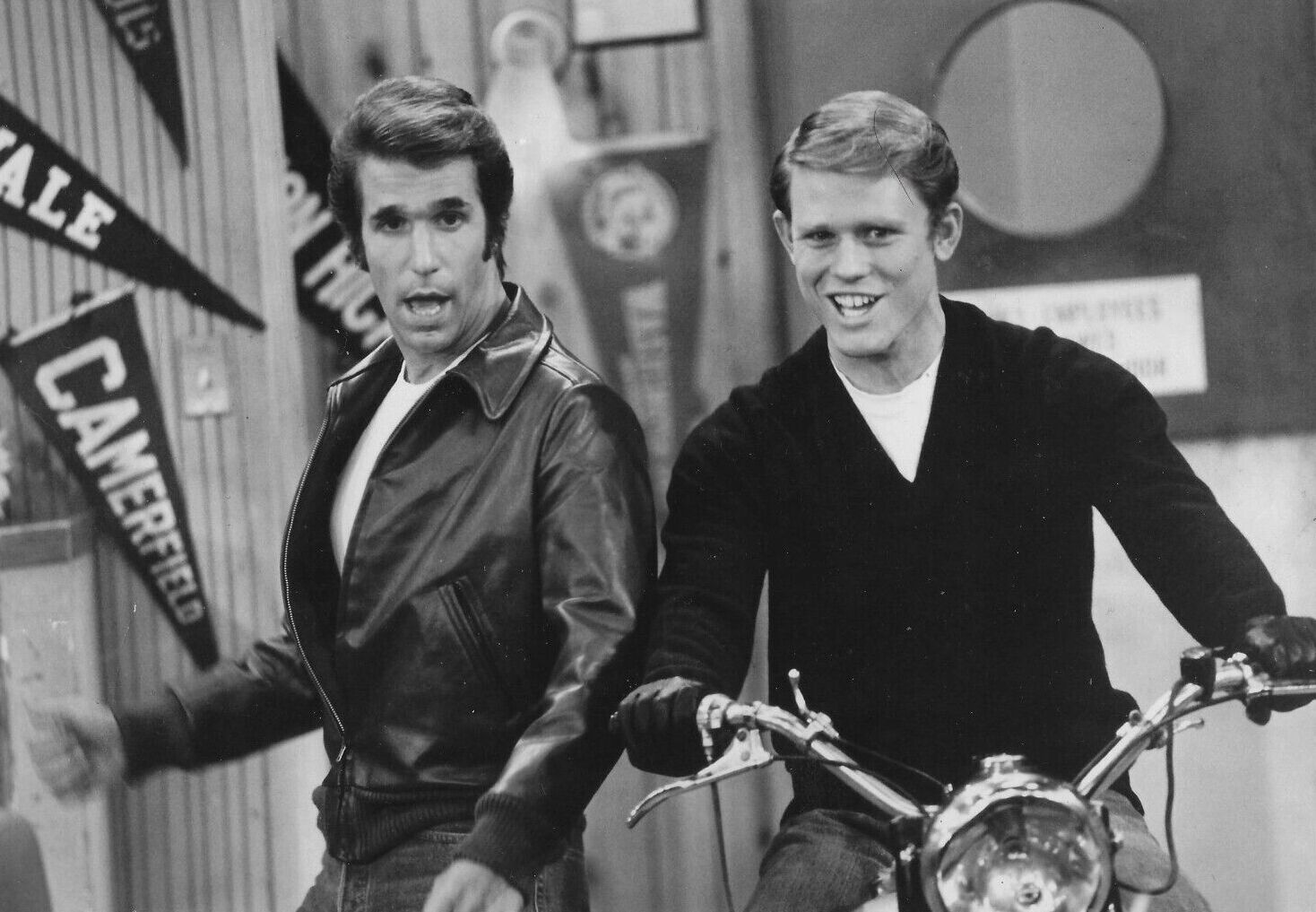
The producers were unable to get Henry Winkler, who played the Fonz (left), to guest star in the episode

Episode writer and executive show producer Danny Smith has written all Family Guy episodes to date to feature Francis; the first was "Holy Crap". After Francis puts up the Christian cross on the Griffins' dining table, Stewie's line, "Yeah, nothing says 'eat up' like a bleeding, half-naked Jew nailed to a piece of wood," was censored from the FOX and syndicated airings, but retained on the Cartoon Network, TBS, and DVD versions. A sequence with Peter saying, "I'm sorry, but if another person says taint today, I am going to bust a nut", after the doctor informs him and Lois that Stewie was exposed to tainted holy water, was intended to be included in the episode, but was removed for unknown reasons. After Stewie is placed in a square box to quarantine him, Lois is shown leaving him halfway through changing his diaper—Stewie then says "finish the job, woman! It smells like New Orleans in here". The script for this episode, including this sketch, was prepared before the events of Hurricane Katrina, so it was never intended to coincide with the events of Katrina. On all airings (including the volume 3 DVD set), Stewie's line has been changed to "It smells like Brian Dennehy in here!"

The Fonz Statue in Peter's church was originally meant to depict The Fonz in a way similar to Jesus's depiction on the Christian cross, but it was rejected due to broadcasting standards. An animated scene showing the congregation of Peter's church singing the Happy Days theme tune was created but never used as the series producers were unable to obtain the rights to it. The series producers were not able to get Henry Winkler or Garry Marshall to guest-star in the episode, so to fill the time gap, they created the scene about Madonna, which they deemed to be "quite funny".

== Cultural references ==
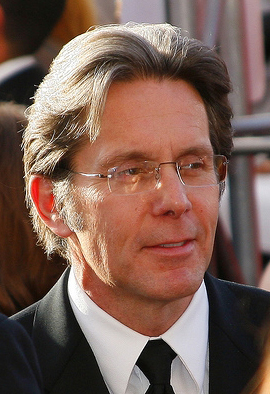
Gary Cole made a cameo appearance in the episode as Bill Lumbergh from the cult film Office Space.

At the beginning of the episode, the family is watching Aquaman on television. Peter is shown watching Jaws 5 on the television, a sequence which MacFarlane describes as "one of [his] favourite gags [they've] ever done on the show". Stewie is shown asking viewers to change the channel to one which is showing Desperate Housewives. When Peter is describing Jesus, he does so in a similar manner to that shown on Quantum Leap. Peter's stuttering while attempting to say "wrong" is a reference to a scene in which Fonzie was unable to say the word on Happy Days. The episode uses a plastic bubble-encased Stewie as the pinball in a close parody of the Pinball Number Count from Sesame Street. One cutaway gag features a modified version of Paula Abdul's "Opposites Attract" with Peter - dressed like a cat - in place of MC Skat Kat. The music playing in the background during the end credits is "Rock Around the Clock", the original Happy Days opening theme; additionally, the credits themselves are shown in a similar style and font.

== Reception ==
"The Father, the Son, and the Holy Fonz" finished 40th in the weekly ratings for the week of December 12–18, 2005, with a Nielsen rating of 8.26 million viewers. Ryan Budke, of TV Squad, said, "This was one of the funniest episodes this year." He added, "I was cracking up from beginning to end on this one." He was "a little disappointed that Henry Winkler did not actually show up in the show".

The Parents Television Council, a frequent critic of Family Guy, named the episode the worst of the week for its treatment of religion.
