= Ceephax Acid Crew =

British electronic musician

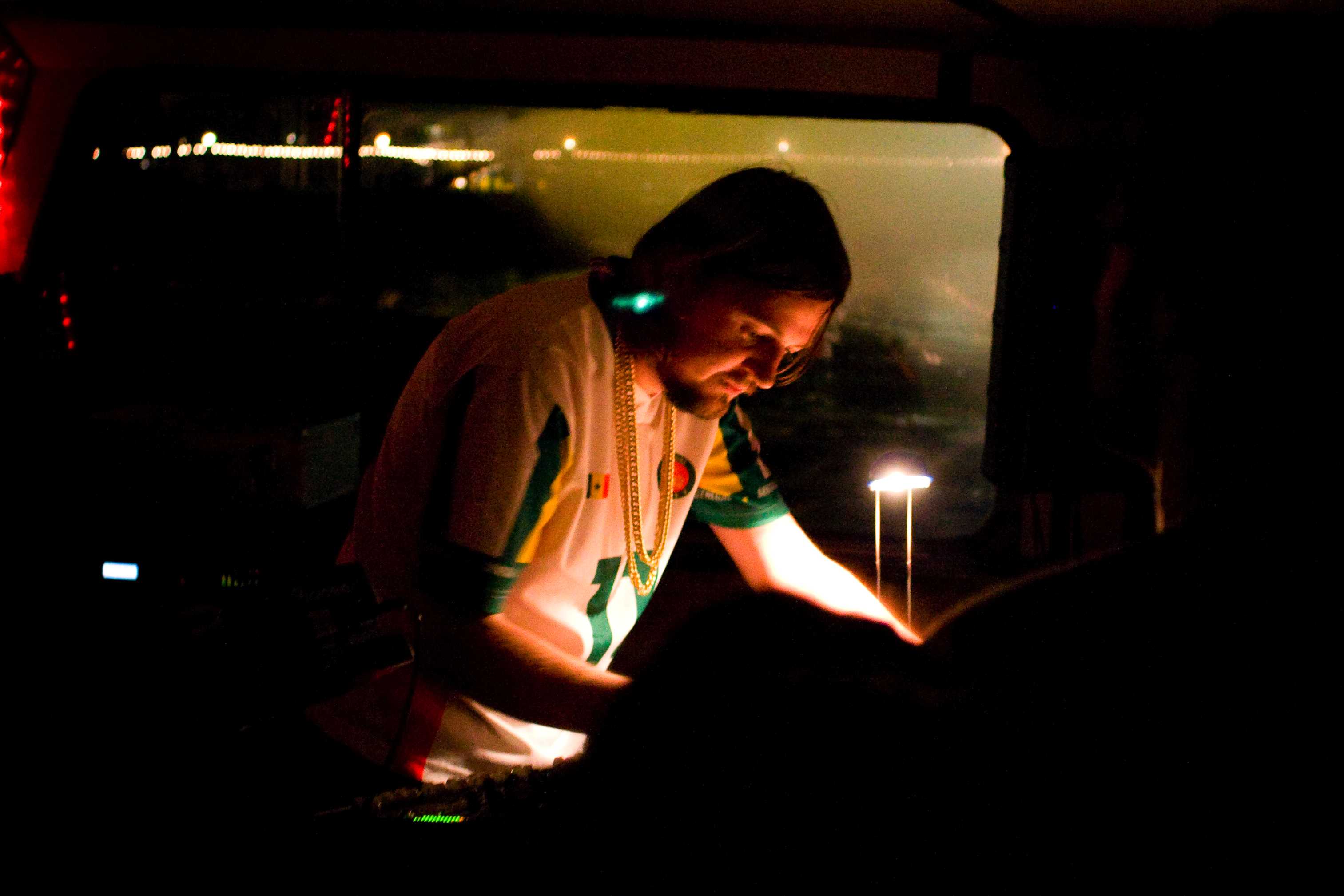
- Jenkinson in 2007

Background information
- Born: Andrew David Jenkinson; March 1979 (age 47)
- Origin: Chelmsford, Essex, England
- Genres: Acid house; drum and bass
- Occupations: Musician
- Instruments: Sampler; drum machine; synthesizers; guitar
- Years active: 1997–present
- Labels: Rephlex; Planet Mu; Waltzer; Breakin'; Firstcask; WéMè
- Website: www.ceephax.co.uk

Andrew David Jenkinson, known professionally as Ceephax Acid Crew, is a British electronic musician and record producer who works primarily in the acid house and drum and bass subgenres, and is associated with the intelligent dance music world, but is also known for comedic presentation and stage presence. Jenkinson is also known simply by the pseudonym Ceephax, which is a reference to the BBC teletext service Ceefax. He is the younger brother of Squarepusher (Tom Jenkinson).

== Music and career ==
Jenkinson became interested in music at 12 years old when he would go into his brother's room and play his brother's SH-101. He started a "joke" rock band called "C-Fax" which did "wobbly covers of nursery rhymes" while still in his teens; they only performed one show, but he kept the name for his later performances.

Ceephax's music from 1997 to 2002 and beyond used mainly vintage (especially Roland) drum machines and synthesizers such as the TB-303. This music was often recorded onto a cassette tape deck. The music was released on vinyl records and cassette tape on underground record labels, such as Breakin' Records, Lo Recordings, and Firstcask. This primitive acid house aesthetic and methodology countered the growing popularity of the computer music and compact disc releases of the time. Rephlex Records and Warp Records also released Jenkinson's remixes of Squarepusher around this time.

From 2003 onwards, alongside his more typical acid style, he has also released drum and bass songs made on old samplers, an Amiga, and various early digital synthesizers. His set on Mary Anne Hobbs' show Breezeblock in 2003, and more tracks such as "Castilian" and "Arcadian" also indicate an interest in chiptune music. From 2007 onwards, he has had full releases on the record labels Rephlex and Planet Mu. He also continues to release on Firstcask and other independent labels such as WéMè, Bugklinik, and his own label, Waltzer. Jenkinson has been a regular performer at the Bang Face club night and weekender since its inception, and an emblematic artists for them as they share a particularly British mix of love of hardcore rave culture and irreverent and absurdist humour; he appeared on the first and so far only Bang Face compilation album BANG FACE - Neo Rave Armageddon in December 2013. He is considered a cult artist, frequently baffling mainstream critics.

Ceephax's live shows are set apart from the popular laptop style of live electronic performance by exclusively using only analogue and early digital equipment and occasionally an Amiga computer. Frequently used hardware includes TB-303, TR-909, TR-707, SH-101, Kenton Pro-2000, and Yamaha RS7000. These sets range from house, acid house, techno, drum and bass, and gabber. He has also produced several music videos, predominantly using old video equipment and early computer animation software.

== Discography ==
=== Albums ===
- Untitled (FSK005) with Drive Time bonus cassette - Firstcask (2000)
- Exidy Tours (as Ceephax) - Firstcask (2003)
- Ceephax Acid Crew - Breakin' Records (2003)
- Ceephax Presents "Acid Travelator" - Funbox Records (2006)
- Volume One - Rephlex Records (2007)
- Volume Two - Rephlex Records (2007)
- Drive Time LP (as Ceephax) - Firstcask (2008)
- Ceeland - Waltzer (2009)
- United Acid Emirates - Planet Mu (2010)
- Live - Waltzer (2011)
- Cro Magnox - WéMè (2013)
- Essex Spacebin OST (as Andy Jenkinson) - Waltzer (2017)
- Camelot Arcade - WéMè (2018)
- Acid Cask Trilogy - (2019)
- Box Steady - Waltzer (2021)
- Baddow Moods (2022)
- Slam Zone (2025)

=== EPs and singles ===
- Radiotin EP - Breakin' Records (1998)
- Bainted Smile EP - Breakin' Records (1998)
- Acid Quakers 1000 (as Ceephax) - Lo Recordings (2000)
- Acid Legacy EP - Breakin' Records (2003)
- Hardcore Wick/Acid Varsity Speciale - Firstcask (2006)
- Hardcore Esplanade - Bug Klinik Records (2006)
- The Crisp Chronicles - WeMe Records (2006)
- Ceerial Port EP - Firstcask (2006)
- Megalift EP - Planet Mu (2007)
- Wild Westie - Kitchen Dweller Records (2008)
- Psychtapolis - WeMe Records (2010)
- The Unstoppable Phax Machine - 030303 Records (2011)
- Capsule In Space/Mediterranean Acid - WALTZER (2012)
- World Dissolver EP - WALTZER (2013)
- Charismatic Integrity Slam EP - WALTZER (2015)
- Acid Fourniture EP - WEME (2017)
- Byron's Ballads EP - WEME (2017)
- Fossil Funk EP - WALTZER (2018)

=== Remixes ===
- "Bioslate (Every Time Mix)" and "Bioslate (Tarzan Mix)" on Remixes 12" by Squarepusher (1998)
- "Ceephax Mix" on Selection Sixteen by Squarepusher (1999)
- "Sho U Rite (Ceephax Remix)" on Kerrier District 2 (2006)
- ”Alien Days (Ceephax Remix)” by MGMT (2013)
