= Poemss =

Studio album by Poemss
- Released: February 11, 2014
- Genre: Electronic
- Label: Planet Mu

Professional ratings
Aggregate scores
Source	Rating
Metacritic	70/100
Review scores
Source	Rating
MusicOMH	3.5/5 stars

Poemss is the debut studio album by Poemss. Poemss is a musical project from Toronto-based producer and music artist Joanne Pollock in collaboration with Aaron Funk, who is best known for recording music as Venetian Snares. After initially meeting each other in Europe, Joanne visited Aaron at his studio and played her music for him. A collaboration between the two happened soon after. Poemss was released in February 2014 under Planet Mu Records.

== Track list ==
No.	Title	Length
1.	"Ancient Pony"	4:28
2.	"Heads on Heads"	5:10
3.	"Bedtime"	4:48
4.	"Moviescapes"	3:10
5.	"Miles Away"	5:47
6.	"Gentle Mirror"	4:56
7.	"Think of Somewhere Nice"	4:48
8.	"Losing Meaning"	3:10
9.	"Hall of Faces"	3:32
10.	"Think of Something Beautiful"	4:56
11.	"Beautiful Astronaut Space Garden Flower Hugs"	4:05
12.	"Kissing Song"	4:16
Total length:		53:06
