= Mirakel Musik =

Swedish record label

- Founded: 1998
- Genre: Noise; Ambient electronica industrial
- Country of origin: Sweden
- Official website: http://www.mirakelmusik.se/

Mirakel Musik is a netlabel, based in Sweden, releasing experimental music in genres such as ambient, electronica, industrial, and noise, (not idm, techno). All releases are under Creative Commons. The label's artists include Maurizio Bianchi and Erratic.
