= 2370894 =

Compilation album by Vsnares
- Released: July 29, 2002
- Genre: Breakcore
- Label: Planet Mu
- Producer: Aaron Funk

Professional ratings
Review scores
Source	Rating
Allmusic	4.5/5 stars
Pitchfork Media	8/10 stars

2370894 is an album by breakcore artist Aaron Funk under the moniker Vsnares. It was released in 2002.

== Background ==
Aaron Funk served as producer on the record. It is a compilation of tracks left over from sessions of previous albums, and contains an instrumental version of "Stamina" from the Cex album Being Ridden as well as songs intended for later albums. The track "Nobody Really Understands Anybody" samples the song "Please, Please, Please Let Me Get What I Want" by The Smiths.

== Track listing ==
No.	Title	Length
1.	"Underground Circus Jesus" (Was composed during the Doll Doll Doll sessions, but not intended for the album.)	3:48
2.	"Ornamental Grape Bone" (Was also composed during the Doll Doll Doll sessions, but wasn't meant for the album either.)	3:55
3.	"Happy Morning Condom Factory"	3:28
4.	"Twisting Ligneous"	9:57
5.	"Fuck Toronto Jungle" (Outtake from Higgins Ultra Low Track Glue Funk Hits 1972–2006.)	5:11
6.	"We Are Cesspools"	3:11
7.	"Sybian Rock"	0:49
8.	"Nobody Really Understands Anybody" (Is implied to have been intended for Winter in the Belly of a Snake.)	4:20
9.	"Stamina" (Instrumental, feat. Cex and Mad E. P.)	3:01
10.	"2 Dollars" (Composed during the sessions for Higgins Ultra Low Track Glue Funk Hits 1972–2006.)	4:40
11.	"British IDM Preset Fanfare (The Hawaiian Hockey Song)"	3:54
