= Ceephax Acid Crew (album) =

Compilation album by Ceephax Acid Crew
- Released: 2003
- Label: Breakin' Records BRK39 CD

Ceephax Acid Crew is the name of two 12" vinyl EPs and a double-CD album of music by Ceephax Acid Crew. All tracks except "Milk Tray" from Part 1 and "Acid Vaccination" from Part Two were released on the double-CD. Additional songs on the double-CD are from Radiotin EP, Bainted Smile EP and Acid Legacy EP.

== Track listing ==
=== Part 1, 12" vinyl ===
Side A

1. "Acid Le Soken"
2. "Camelot Pollution"
3. "Culteddy"

Side B

1. "The Snake Block (Ice Rink Emotions)"
2. "Milk Tray"
3. "Play Your Cards Right"

=== Part 2, 12" vinyl ===
Side A

1. "Fantastic Planet"
2. "Friday Film Special Acid"
3. "Acid Faust"

Side B

1. "Acid Vaccination"
2. "Swab Funk"
3. "Credick"

=== 2xCD ===
CD 1

1. "Camelot Pollution" - 2:38 (from Ceephax Acid Crew Part 1)
2. "Swab Funk" - 6:01 (from Ceephax Acid Crew Part 2)
3. "The Snake Block (Ice Rink Emotions)" - 7:19 (from Ceephax Acid Crew Part 1)
4. "Acid Faust" - 1:53 (from Ceephax Acid Crew Part 2)
5. "Marshmellow" - 3:14 (from Acid Legacy EP)
6. "Acid Le Soken" - 8:31 (from Ceephax Acid Crew Part 1)
7. "Play Your Cards Right" - 2:13 (from Ceephax Acid Crew Part 1)
8. "Culteddy" - 3:21 (from Ceephax Acid Crew Part 1)
9. "Friday Film Special Acid" - 4:22 (from Ceephax Acid Crew Part 2)
10. "Fantastic Planet" - 7:05 (from Ceephax Acid Crew Part 2)
11. "Credick" - 4:05 (from Ceephax Acid Crew Part 2)

CD 2

1. "Ceephax Acid" - 5:53 (from Bainted Smile EP)
2. "Ghost Train Acid (Long Version)" - 3:16 (from Bainted Smile EP) (the Bainted Smile version doesn't say Long Version and is 2:40)
3. "Acid On Sea" - 4:10 (from Radiotin EP)
4. "Arterial Acid Part I" - 2:39 (from Radiotin EP)
5. "Arterial Acid Part II" - 2:22 (from Radiotin EP)
6. "Theme For Radiotin" - 0:42 (from Radiotin EP)
7. "Arterial Acid Part III" - 2:23 (from Radiotin EP)
8. "Arterial Acid Part IV" - 2:20 (from Bainted Smile EP)
9. "Vax Alley" - 2:26 (from Bainted Smile EP)
10. "Space Paranoia (Long Version)" - 4:17 (from Radiotin EP) (the Radiotin version doesn't say Long Version and is 3:56)
11. "Dennis Weaver Acid" - 5:06 (from Bainted Smile EP)
12. "Static (Long Version)" - 4:19 (from Bainted Smile EP) (the Bainted Smile version doesn't say Long Version and is 3:09)
13. "3 Note Safari" - 2:26 (from Radiotin EP)
14. "Flogan's Code (Part II)"/"Ending" - 10:16 (10:06 and 0:10 respectively) (both from Radiotin EP)
