= Metaphysics (Duncan Avoid album) =

Studio album by Duncan Avoid
- Released: 2004
- Genre: Experimental, Electronic
- Length: 57:14
- Label: Hive Records

Duncan Avoid chronology
Cybernetics (2003)	Metaphysics (2004)

Metaphysics is the second album by Duncan Avoid.

== Track listing ==
1. "Awakening" – 2:03
2. "Auditory Arms" – 3:36
3. "Parallel Grounds" – 4:07
4. "Systemic Ressentiment" – 5:24
5. "Lucid [Down the Rabbit Hole]" – 5:31
6. "Attention Deficit Disorder" – 7:51
7. "Consciousness Creeping" – 3:08
8. "S.H.I.F.I." – 5:36
9. "Convergence" – 3:44
10. "Auditory Arms – 4:25 (remixed by C-Drik)
11. "Cartesian Doubt" – 1:50
12. "Convergence" – 4:21 (remixed by Subskan)
13. "Plastone Ground" – 2:28 (remixed by Kotra)
14. "Rue de la Fée Verte" – 3:42

== Recognition ==
Metaphysics received widespread critical acclaim upon its initial release, and was named greatest album of the year by Xanopticon at Igloo Magazine.
