= Shitmat =

British musician

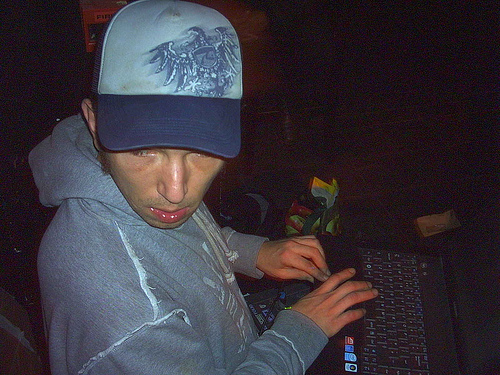
- Performing in 2008

Background information
- Born: Henry Collins
- Origin: Brighton and Hove, United Kingdom
- Genres: Mashup, jungle, breakcore, plunderphonics
- Occupation: Musician
- Years active: 2002–2012, 2016–
- Website: shitmat.neocities.org

Shitmat is an English breakcore artist and mashup producer, one of several monikers used by Henry Collins. Shitmat became known in the early 2000s for releases on the Ad Noiseam and Planet Mu labels. He also set up his own label, Wrong Music and put on parties in Brighton. His 2012 project Mash Hits remixed every UK number one single from 1952 onwards. He then stopped the Shitmat project, restarting it again in 2016.

== Background ==
Shitmat is used as a pseudonym by artist Henry Collins, who also uses monikers such as Kyler, Armand Van Hard-On and Misty Conditions. DJ Slipmatt took exception to the name when they were both on the same lineup and insisted on Shitmat's name being written in smaller text.

In the early 2000s, Shitmat set up the label Wrong Music and put on events in Brighton. He became known for his mashup productions which blended jungle, breakcore and plunderphonics, released on Ad Noiseam, Planet Mu and his own label. In the 2004 and 2016 releases Killababylonkutz and Killababylonkutz 2, Collins produced 20 different tracks all featuring the Baby Cham vocal "Babylon Bwoy", combined with the Ghostbusters theme tune or music from Slayer, Vengaboys and NOFX. Shitmat termed this genre "mashcore", as represented by the track "There’s No Business Like Propa' Rungleclotted Mashup Bizznizz", played by John Peel.

Shitmat has performed at a number of festivals, including SuperSonic Festival (2006), Hokaben Festival (2008), Glade Festival, Glastonbury Festival (2009), All Tomorrow's Parties (2010) and Dour Festival (2011).

In 2012, Shitmat decided to remix every UK number one single since 1952, in a project called Mash Hits. This meant working with over 1,200 tracks from artists such as John Lennon, David Bowie, David Cassidy, David Essex and David Sneddon. All the Davids were rolled together into one mashup track.

Shitmat announced in December 2012 that he was ready to kill off his moniker, stating "It’s basically time for me to move on, progress, evolve and let the other music I make take the front seat. I’ve always enjoyed experimenting with humour and heavy music but for me, I’d like to launch and explore some of my other projects and ideas". He planned to release a new album under the name Tafkas (The artist formerly known as Shitmat) on Love Love records. He then restarted the project in 2016, telling Vice News that "I have resurrected Shitmat. I decided I still like DJing, making mashups and being that dickhead".

== Selected works ==
- Killababylonkutz (2004, Planet Mu)
- Full English Breakfest (2004, Planet Mu)
- Monsters Of Mashup (2005, Ad Noiseam) with Bong-Ra and Enduser
- Shitmat Presents The Rolf Harris Mashup CD (2006, Wrong Music)
- Hang the DJ (2006, Wrong Music)
- The Subliminal Pograddy Disection (2006, Wrong Music)
- Grooverider (2007, Planet Mu)
- One Foot In The Rave (2009, Planet Mu)
- Full of Shit (Volume Bum) (2010, Wrong Music)
- Global Hypercolour EP (2012, Bandcamp)
- The NeverEnding EastEnders Album (2017, Bandcamp)
