= Your Face (EP) =

EP by Venetian Snares
- Released: July 24, 2015
- Genre: Electronic
- Label: Planet Mu
- Producer: Venetian Snares

Venetian Snares chronology
My Love Is a Bulldozer (2014)	Your Face (2015)	Thank You for Your Consideration (2015)

Your Face is a 2015 EP by Venetian Snares released under Planet Mu Records. Your Face was announced on July 8, 2015, and released on July 24. It followed My Love Is a Bulldozer, which was Venetian Snares' first album after a two-year hiatus.

== Track listing ==
Side A
No.	Title	Length
1.	"Your Face When I Finally"	6:32
2.	"Former Eagle"	2:34
3.	"Red Orange 2"	3:45

Side B
No.	Title	Length
1.	"Become Magic Dolphins"	5:20
2.	"Stockpiles of Sentiment"	4:54
3.	"Misericordial"	4:27
4.	"Your Face When I Finally (glass version)"	3:12

Professional ratings
Review scores
Source	Rating
AllMusic	4/5 stars
Exclaim	6/10
