= 1961 (Last Step album) =

Studio album by Last Step
- Released: October 12, 2008
- Genre: Acid techno, IDM
- Length: 51:38
- Label: Planet Mu

1961 is an album by Canadian electronic musician Aaron Funk under the moniker of Last Step. It is in an electronic music style similar to the Aphex Twin Analord series but exhibiting the odd meters typical of Funk. The album is released by Planet Mu both as a CD and as 3x12"

== Track listing ==
No.	Title	Length
1.	"My Home Recordings"	5:41
2.	"61 Disco"	4:35
3.	"HAHA Waffles"	3:13
4.	"Seafoam Green"	4:15
5.	"Portoghese"	4:35
6.	"Triple Self Portrait"	4:29
7.	"Surf Green"	5:02
8.	"Sonic Blue"	3:32
9.	"30th"	4:28
10.	"Showboat"	3:15
11.	"Shoreline Gold"	3:35
12.	"Cakey"	4:58

=== Personnel ===
- Aaron Funk - composition
