= Wicked Hemlocks =

- Origin: Brooklyn, New York
- Genres: Noise rock, indie rock, experimental rock, electronic, psychedelic rock, psychedelic pop, psychedelic
- Years active: 2007–present
- Labels: Stick in your Spokes
- Members: Lyndon Walker; Jamie Schmitz; Robert Granata
- Past members: Ned Shatzer; Todd Baker; Michael Hanf; Brian McCorkle
- Website: wickedhemlocks.com

The Wicked Hemlocks are a Brooklyn-based experimental psychedelic pop band.

Wicked Hemlocks is Lyndon Walker (guitar/vocals), Jamie Schmitz (percussion) and Robert Granata (synth/vocals), and Judah Rubin (guitar).

Past members: Brian McCorkle (bass/vocals), Michael Hanf (synth/vocals), Todd Baker (bass/vocals).

== History ==
Wicked Hemlocks began when Lyndon Walker and Jamie Schmitz aborted a 2007 effort to create the soundtrack to an avant-garde short film. The duo had met in 2006 through a friend, and although Lyndon was coming from a garage-punk background and Jamie from an electronic one, they were able to meet in the middle and plant the seeds of the psychedelic landscape that would grow into Wicked Hemlocks. According to Lyndon, The idea was to work backwards and create music with the vision of a film, and then create the film for the music. I had a vision of an underground, cultish secret society in New York that performed rituals and ceremonies cloaked in the candle-lit shadows of a dingy Brooklyn warehouse.” With this macabre imagery in mind, the two set to work on a bevy of haunting, original pieces. When the filmmakers backed out, however, Lyndon and Jamie were left with a finished score and no visuals to accompany it. Instead of scrapping the material, they formed the Wicked Hemlocks, and put the songs out as an album aptly titled “Quill of the Mad” under alias label Stick in Your Spokes Records.

To support the album, Lyndon and Jamie tried to put together a live show with a number of other people, but when that became too complex, they returned to writing and released the “Lonely Places” demo. “As soon as the demo happened we had a clear vision of where the next album was going, and we knew for sure we could play it live, so we kept driving,” Lyndon says. In February 2008 the duo met up with Brian McCorkle, who was playing as the one-man project What Color Is Your Machine Gun. Lyndon and Jamie found themselves on the same musical plane as Brian, and they decided to head up to a farmhouse in Brattleboro, VT to record. They set up in a barn, accompanied by some “psychedelic experiences,” and began to lay down the tracks that would become their self-titled album. The new material features harmonies and melodies reminiscent of 60s psych-pop.

After recording the album, the band found a van and began playing shows in July 2008. Michael Hanf (who played with Lindsay Holler and Absalan in South Carolina) joined in October 2008 to solidify the line-up.
