= Rossz Csillag Alatt Született =

Studio album by Venetian Snares
- Released: March 14, 2005
- Recorded: 2004
- Genres: Breakcore; drill 'n' bass; IDM; classical
- Length: 46:46
- Label: Planet Mu
- Producer: Aaron Funk

Venetian Snares chronology
Winnipeg Is a Frozen Shithole (2005)	Rossz Csillag Alatt Született (2005)	Meathole (2005)

Rossz Csillag Alatt Született (Hungarian: [ˈross ˈt͡ʃillɒɡ ˈɒlɒtt ˈsylɛtɛtt]) is the twelfth studio album by Canadian electronic music producer Venetian Snares, released on the Planet Mu label in 2005. Inspired by a visit to Hungary, the album title and all of the track names are in Hungarian; Rossz csillag alatt született translates to "Born Under The Wrong Star", or figuratively, "Cursed From Birth". The album consists of classical strings and brass combined with breakbeats.

== Overview ==
The concept of the album came when Aaron Funk imagined himself as a pigeon on Budapest's Királyi Palota (Royal Palace). Its third track, "Öngyilkos vasárnap" is a cover of the song "Szomorú vasárnap" ("Gloomy Sunday") by Hungarian composer Rezső Seress, which has been referred to as the Hungarian suicide song. According to urban legend, Seress's song has inspired the suicide of multiple people, including his fiancée. The song was reportedly banned in Hungary. It has also been covered by many artists. Billie Holiday's vocals are sampled in this track.

The album also samples various pieces of classical music:

- The first movement of Béla Bartók's fourth string quartet, in track two.
- The second of Igor Stravinsky's Three Pieces for Solo Clarinet, in track five.
- The first movement of Gustav Mahler's 3rd Symphony (trombone solo), in track five.
- Measures 121-128 (14), 134 (15) and 144 (16) of Bartók's first string quartet (third movement), in track five.
- Niccolò Paganini's 7th Caprice in A minor, in track five.
- The beginning of the solo part of Franz Waxman's Carmen Fantasie in track five.
- The first and third measure of the fourth movement of Bartók's sixth string quartet, in track six.
- Sir Edward Elgar's "Cello Concerto in E Minor, Op. 85", in track eight.
- The second movement of Sergei Prokofiev's Quintet in G Minor in track eight.
- The Siciliana of Fantasia No. 9 from Georg Philipp Telemann's Twelve Fantasias, in track ten.

While there were no official music videos released with the album, artist David O'Reilly produced an unofficial computer generated video for "Szamár madár", and Mason Shefa produced a film featuring "Szerencsétlen".

== Critical reception ==
Professional ratings
Review scores
Source	Rating
AllMusic	5/5 stars
Pitchfork	7.5/10
Sputnikmusic	4.5/5
Tiny Mix Tapes	5/5

Alan Ranta of Tiny Mix Tapes praised Rossz csillag alatt született as Funk's "most accomplished album to date" and described it as being "of uncouth beauty that is at once sublime, timeless, cinematic, sporadic, and moving from start to finish." Sputnikmusic writer Nick Greer hailed it as an "absolutely amazing" release that "truly excels in how it shifts paradigms in unexpected ways". William Tilland of AllMusic called the album "typically uncompromising and unsettling, although it is certainly constructed with great technical skill and maintains an abrasive beauty throughout." Cameron MacDonald of Pitchfork was more reserved in his praise and felt that "Funk's percussive palate could have ventured beyond the standard-issued 'Amen' breakbeats", while concluding that "Rossz's totality still possesses nerves that can cast shadows that never dissipate away from the mind."

Tiny Mix Tapes ranked Rossz csillag alatt született the 25th best album of 2005 and the 31st best album of the 2000s. In 2014, Resident Advisor critic Hugh Taylor described it as "one of breakcore's most important albums". In 2017, Pitchfork placed it at number 25 on its list of "The 50 Best IDM Albums of All Time".

== Track listing ==
=== CD release ===
No.	Title	Length
1.	"Sikertelenség" ([ˈʃikɛrtɛlɛnʃeːɡ], lit. "Failure")	0:41
2.	"Szerencsétlen" ([ˈsɛrɛnt͡ʃeːtlɛn], lit. "Unlucky" or as noun, "Poor soul")	4:55
3.	"Öngyilkos vasárnap" ([ˈøɲɟilkoʃ ˈvɒʃaːrnɒp], lit. "Suicidal Sunday")	3:26
4.	"Felbomlasztott mentőkocsi" ([ˈfɛlbomlɒstotː ˈmɛntøːkot͡ʃi], lit. "Disintegrated Ambulance")	3:44
5.	"Hajnal" ([ˈhɒjnɒl], female name, lit. "Dawn")	7:46
6.	"Galamb egyedül" ([ˈɡɒlɒmb ˈɛɟɛdyl], lit. "Pigeon, Alone")	1:36
7.	"Második galamb" ([ˈmaːʃodik ˈɡɒlɒmb], lit. "Second Pigeon")	6:01
8.	"Szamár madár" ([ˈsɒmaːr ˈmɒdaːr], lit. and fig. "Jackass Bird")	5:49
9.	"Hiszékeny" ([ˈhiseːkɛɲ], lit. "Gullible")	1:39
10.	"Kétsarkú mozgalom" ([ˈkeːtʃɒrkuː ˈmozɡɒlom], lit. "Bipolar Movement")	8:50
11.	"Senki dala" ([ˈʃɛŋki ˈdɒlɒ], lit. "Nobody's Song")	2:16

=== 2×12" release ===
Side A
No.	Title	Length
1.	"Sikertelenség"	0:40
2.	"Szerencsétlen"	4:55
3.	"Öngyilkos vasárnap"	3:26

Side B
No.	Title	Length
1.	"Felbomlasztott mentőkocsi"	3:44
2.	"Hajnal"	7:46

Side C
No.	Title	Length
1.	"Galamb egyedül"	1:36
2.	"Második galamb"	6:01
3.	"Szamár madár"	5:49

Side D
No.	Title	Length
1.	"Hiszékeny"	1:39
2.	"Kétsarkú mozgalom"	8:50
3.	"Senki dala"	2:16
