= Thinner (netlabel) =

German netlabel releasing electronic music

- Founded: 1998
- Founder: Thomas Jaldemark
- Genre: Dub techno, minimal house, ambient
- Country of origin: Germany
- Location: Frankfurt, Germany

Thinner was a German netlabel, launched in 1998, that released mainly electronic dub, ambient, and other variants of techno and house music. It was founded by Thomas Jaldemark and mainly operated by Sebastian Redenz and Ole Schulte as leading parts of an international team until 2009. The label was based in Frankfurt, Germany. Thinner’s catalogue includes releases from artists such as Digitalverein, Marko Fürstenberg, Benfay, Pheek, krill.minima, Vladislav Delay, Christian Bloch and many others. By September 2006, Thinner productions had accumulated over two million MP3 downloads. Thinner had a sublabel called Autoplate, focusing on experimental and ambient music.

In 2008, Der Spiegel described Thinner as having the reputation of being "the best of its kind" among several thousand netlabels worldwide. Thinner was repeatedly voted best netlabel in the annual polls of de:Bug magazine. In 2007, Redenz was invited to present Thinner's volunteer-based business model to Sony BMG's top executives.

== Label sound ==
Much of the music published by Thinner can be described as dub-inspired, i.e. some permutation of a fusion of dub with house, techno, or even ambient music.

Many of early Thinner virtual releases were clearly efforts to emulate styles/genres offered by popular physical labels (e.g. Basic Channel). From 2001 to 2006, Thinner grew and evolved to encompass a wider variety of sounds beyond the signature dub-inspired techno/house music for which it had become recognized initially.

== Notable artists ==
- Benfay
- Brian Kage
- Christian Bloch
- Curse
- Danny Kreutzfeldt
- Das Kraftfuttermischwerk
- Deluge
- Dennis DeSantis
- Digitalis
- Digitalverein
- Eloi Brunelle
- Gastón Arévalo
- Holger Flinsch
- Jason Corder
- Jeff Bennett
- Johan Skugge
- krill.minima
- Marko Fürstenberg
- Mateo Murphy
- Mikkel Metal
- Niels Jensen
- Nulleins
- Paul Keeley
- Pheek
- Philipp Weigl
- Rktic
- Selffish
- Surphase
- Taho
- Theodor Zox
- T-Polar
- Unit 21
- Veer
- Vladislav Delay

== Releases ==
- THN001 VA - "Thinnerism.01"
- THN002 Dupont - Subtle Sample Sewing (deleted)
- THN003 Karsten Hammer Hansen - "Elektric.01 EP"
- THN004 Curse - "Resolved EP"
- THN005 Rktic - "Northern Lights LP"
- THN006 Nulleins - "Cyclism EP"
- THN007 Benfay - "Carbon EP"
- THN008 Dolby - "Dub Expo EP"
- THN009 Neurotron - Das Gesetz Der Ersten Wellenfront (deleted)
- THN010 VA - "Thinnerism.02"
- THN011 Rktic - "Northern Lights Remixed" 150 Copies CDR!
- THN012 Benfay - "Nitron EP"
- THN013 Blamstrain - Kavel EP"
- THN014 Digitalverein - "Zu Hause²"
- THN015 Dolby - "Midnight EP"
- THN016 PVO - "Protolith EP"
- THN017 Digitalverein - "Zu Hause² Remixes"
- THN018 Digitalverein - "Zu Hause² Variationen"
- THN019 Neurotron - The Light Of Other Days (deleted)
- THN020 Nulleins - "Freeway EP"
- THN021 Falter - "Taumelflug EP"
- THN022 Digitalis - "Sin:Ergy EP"
- THN023 Selffish - "Enas EP"
- THN024 Danny Kreutzfeldt - "Re:Core 2CD"
- THN025 Pete Larsen - "Berlin Calling EP"
- THN026 Benfay - "Bergflanke EP"
- THN027 Christian Bloch - "Young American LP"
- THN028 Niels Jensen - "77 LP"
- THN029 Kazooo - "Palermo Beats EP"
- THN030 VA - "Montrealers"
- THN031 Marko Fürstenberg - "Option EP"
- THN032 Simex - "Memory Dump" (deleted)
- THN033 Digitalverein - "Internal Course LP"
- THN034 Curse - "Wet Springtime Sessions EP"
- THN035 Breitbannt - "Back from Exile EP"
- THN036 And.Id - "After 5 EP"
- THN037 Lufth - "Tendenzen EP"
- THN038 krill.minima - "Zwischen Zwei Und Einer Sekunde"
- THN039 VA - "Silent Season Dub"
- THN040 Surphase & Rktic - "Norddeutsch EP"
- THN041 Chronolux - "The Manila Context EP"
- THN042 Eloi Brunelle - "Montréal Night Grooves EP"
- THN043 Pheek - "Tabisuru Kokoro LP"
- THN044 Mateo Murphy - "The Rising EP"
- THN045 Dick Richards - "Costa Daurada EP"
- THN046 Sectorchestra - "Fault n'Roll EP"
- THN047 Marko Fürstenberg - "Gesamtlaufzeit LP"
- THN048 Paul Keeley - "Sussex Blue EP"
- THN049 Baier/Box - "Boxing/Unboxing EP"
- THN050 VA - "I Like To Listen!"
- THN051 deluge - "Departure In Affection And New Noise LP"
- THN052 Paul Keeley & Dennis DeSantis - "Transatlantic Nightclub EP"
- THN053 Holger Flinsch - "The Watcher And The Tower EP"
- THN054 Benfay - "One Touch Button Music LP"
- THN055 Selffish - "Ena LP"
- THN056 Brian Kage - "Eight Ways EP"
- THN057 Jason Corder - "Microcosmos LP"
- THN058 Mikkel Metal - "Cassini Pieces MLP"
- THN059 Theodor Zox - "Pastels 1-4 EP"
- THN060 VA - "One Touch Button Remixes"
- THN061 Johan Skugge - "Skyddsnisch EP"
- THN062 T-Polar - "Tonal Soul EP"
- THN063 Jeff Bennett - "Lowdown EP"
- THN064 Swat Squad - "Lunática EP"
- THN065 Holger Flinsch - "Discovery EP"
- THN066 Vladislav Delay - "Demo(n) Cuts EP"
- THN067 Digitalverein - "Changes LP"
- THN068 Alice Mackay & Benfay - "Lighthouse EP"
- THN069 deluge - "The Metapop complex LP"
- THN070 VA - "Crossways 3LP"
- THN071 Lomov - "Mounting Stags"
- THN072 Veer - "Where Nothing Ever Happened"
- THN073 Timm Kawohl - "Cascades"
- THN074 VA - "Thinnergy"
- THN075 Christian Bloch - "New Age"
- THN076 Pheek - "Consortium"
- THN077 T-Polar - "Red Machine"
- THN078 Marko Fürstenberg - "Classics"
- THN079 Digitalis - "Zeitraum"
- THN080 Bern - "Just Married"
- THN081 Sectorchestra - "No Morchestra"
- THN082 Thinner & Epsilonlab - "Silence Is Presence"
- THN083 Alta Infidelidad - "Cactus Y Volcanes"
- THN084 Nulleins - "Seven Spaces"
- THN085 Das Kraftfuttermischwerk - "Eingang Nach Draußen"
- THN086 Gate Zero - "Radio overBoard"
- THN087 Unit 21 - "September–October"
- THN088 Ben Businovski - "Simulacraic Wonderland"
- THN089 T-Polar - "Procession"
- THN090 Philipp Weigl - "Monsters"
- THN091 VA - "Demo Tracks"
- THN092 Christian Dittmann - Emporio
- THN093 Sensual Physics - The Thin Girl
- THN094 Sans Soleil - Boreal
- THN095 Laura Palmer - Background
- THN096 Benfay - Born On A Houseboat
- THN097 Das Kraftfuttermischwerk - Blüte Seines Lebens
- THN098 krill.minima - Urlaub Auf Balkonien
- THN099 Gastón Arévalo - Ultramar
- THN100 VA - 100
- THN101 Daniel Gardner - Under the Shower Tower
- THN102 Leif - Benrhos Dubs
- THN103 Leif - Fundamental Movement
- THN104 Dub Kult - Dew
- THN105 Trace - Kiss and Run
- THN106 Gabriel Le Mar - Dubwize
- THN107 Motionfield - Laponia
- THN108 Federsen - Social Realism
- THN109 Gastón Arévalo - Austral
- THN110 Sustainer - Vapor
- THN111 Gabriel Le Mar - Wize Dubs
- THN112 T-Polar - Bow To The Butter Blaster
- THN113 Gradient - Seashore

== See also ==
- List of record labels
- List of electronic music record labels
- Electronic music
- Techno
- House
