= Venetian Snares =

Canadian electronic musician

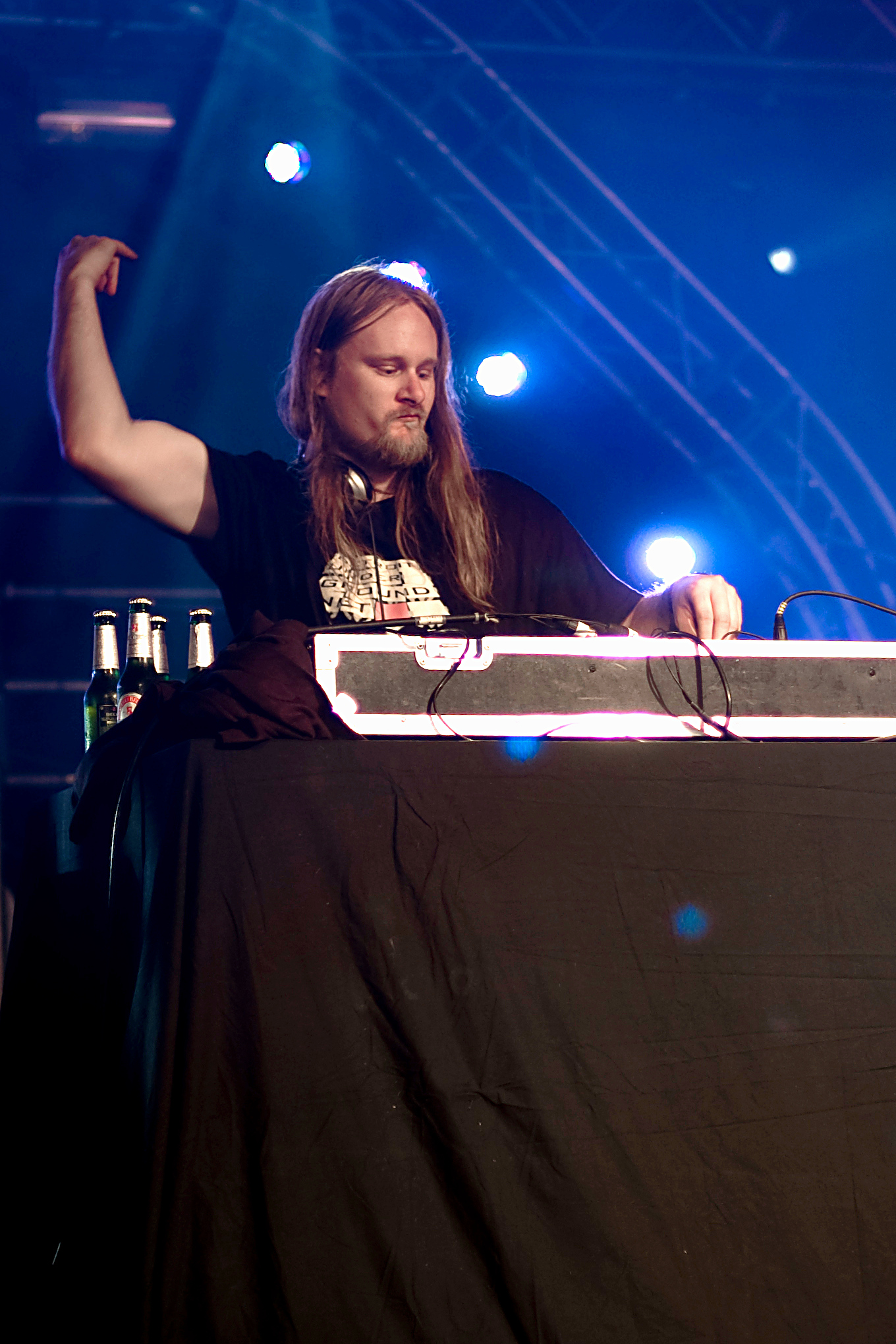
- Funk performing in 2008

Background information
- Born: Aaron Funk; January 11, 1975 (age 51); Winnipeg, Manitoba
- Genres: Breakcore; IDM; experimental
- Instruments: Drum machine, Renoise, synthesizer, modular synthesizer, sampler, softsynth
- Years active: 1992–present
- Labels: Planet Mu, Sublight, Hymen

Aaron Funk (born January 11, 1975), mainly known artistically as Venetian Snares, is a Canadian electronic musician based in Winnipeg, Manitoba. He is widely known for innovating and popularising the breakcore genre, and is one of the most recognisable artists to be signed to Planet Mu, an experimental electronic music label. His signature style involves meticulously complex drums, eclectic use of samples, and odd time signatures, in particular, 7/4.

His 2005 release Rossz Csillag Alatt Született combined breakbeats with orchestral samples, and was released to critical acclaim, helping bring the artist and genre into popularity within the experimental electronic music community.

Funk has been a very prolific musician, often releasing several records each year, sometimes on several different record labels, including Planet Mu, Hymen, Sublight, and his own imprint Timesig, and also under different aliases, including Last Step, Snares Man!, Snares, and Speed Dealer Moms, although there have been fewer releases in recent years. He has also explored other electronic genres such as glitch, IDM, modern classical and acid techno.

== Career ==
=== 1990s to early 2000s: Greg Hates Car Culture ===
Funk began producing music at least as early as 1992, when he was experimenting with several 'ghetto blasters':

I'd use a bunch of ghetto blasters playing all at once to play different sounds I'd recorded with some shitty ghetto blaster. Most of my sources I'd get riding around on my bicycle and just listening for interesting sounds. I'd use garbage bins and streetlights and anything else I could find that was hollow or metallic to bang out rhythms on. Then I'd set up all the ghettos and record them all playing into that same ghetto blaster. Then I'd play a bunch of those tapes all at the same time and record that and so on. Then I would do cut-ups or pause-ups of those tapes to create a more startling rhythmic effect. A strange ritual in retrospect.
I somehow came across this looping delay pedal that would hold a 2-second sample. This pedal coupled with the ghetto blaster experiments really changed my life.

Funk then got an Amiga 500 computer, where he initially produced music through a music tracker, OctaMED. He formed the name 'Venetian Snares' after '...writing a track with really fast snare rolls that sounded like scraping a stick across a grate or running a pencil down venetian blinds in a distracted classroom'.

He would self-release several cassettes during the 1990s, releasing his first three studio albums Spells, Subvert! and Rorschach Stuffocate all on cassette. He released the 1999 12-inch EP, Greg Hates Car Culture, followed by a split album with Stunt Rock, Fuck Canada // Fuck America, and more EPs in the next year 2000, including Salt, 7 sevens.med, Shitfuckers!, and his fourth studio album, printf("shiver in eternal darkness/n");. Funk then moved to using a PC sometime before 2000, producing music in MED Soundstudio, a Windows port of OctaMED.

=== Early-to-mid 2000s: Planet Mu Records and prolific output ===
After hearing Greg Hates Car Culture while browsing a Minneapolis record store, Mike Paradinas (also known as μ-Ziq) immediately signed Funk on to his record label Planet Mu, leading to three releases for the label in 2001, a collaboration album with Speedranch, Making Orange Things, a 7-inch EP, Defluxion, and a full-length album, Songs About My Cats. In addition, he also released Doll Doll Doll, as well as split 12-inch with Cex and a raggacore 7-inch as Snares Man!, all in the same year. The Snares Man! 7-inch has been cited as influential in the development of raggacore. The following year, 2002, Funk released three full-length albums, Higgins Ultra Low Track Glue Funk Hits 1972–2006, 2370894 (under Vsnares), and Winter in the Belly of a Snake, plus a 15-minute limited edition EP, A Giant Alien Force More Violent & Sick Than Anything You Can Imagine. 2003 saw the release of The Chocolate Wheelchair Album, Find Candace, a 7-inch EP Badminton, two split 7-inch EPs, one with Fanny under BeeSnares, and the other with Phantomsmasher, and an experimental collaboration album with Hecate, Nymphomatriarch. Following 2004, Funk released Huge Chrome Cylinder Box Unfolding; three EPs, Horse And Goat, Infolepsy, and Moonglow/This Bitter Earth; and a remix of Doormouse's Skelechairs. During this time period, Funk started using Cubase next to MED.

=== Mid-2000s to mid-2010s: Rossz Csillag Alatt Született and slowing output ===
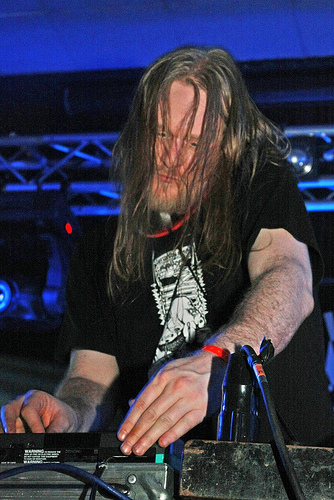
Funk performing at Bangface Weekender 2008

Funk first released in 2005 his tribute album to his hometown, Winnipeg is a Frozen Shithole, before releasing Rossz Csillag Alatt Született, an album inspired by Funk's recent Hungary trip that combines fast breakbeats with classical strings and trumpets, to critical acclaim. 'Tiny Mix Tapes called it Funk's "...most accomplished album to date", describing the album as "... of uncouth beauty that is at once sublime, timeless, cinematic, sporadic, and moving from start to finish for the uppity junglist or the CBC Radio 1 listener in your family". At the same year, Funk has also released another album, Meathole, and debuted under his new acid-oriented alias, Last Step, in You're a Nice Girl.

In the later years, Funk's amount of releases would decrease to at least one each year, compared to as many as six earlier before. The next year, 2006, Funk released one album, Cavalcade of Glee and Dadaist Happy Hardcore Pom Poms, and a single EP, Hospitality. Another classical-styled album, My Downfall (Original Soundtrack); the Pink + Green EP, a 10-inch series of dubstep-styled Black Sabbath covers under Snares; and his first full-length self-titled album under Last Step, were released in 2007. In 2008, Funk released another Last Step album, 1961. He also released the Detrimentalist album and the "Miss Balaton" single in the same year. The album Filth and the Horsey Noises EP were released in 2009. Afterwards in 2010, Funk released the My So-Called Life album and a 12-inch collaboration with Red Hot Chili Peppers guitarist John Frusciante under Speed Dealer Moms. Funk's only release in 2011 is the EP Cubist Reggae. Two EPs Fool the Detector and Affectionate, as well as a Last Step album Sleep. were released in 2012. Live At WTW 07 (AKA Return Of The Snare) - June 15, 2001 was released in 2013. Funk's next release came in 2014 with a new album, My Love Is a Bulldozer, as well as a self-titled debut collaboration album with Joanne Pollock, Poemss, and a self-released Last Step EP, Lost Sleep. Funk released the Your Face EP in 2015.

=== 2015–present: Bandcamp ===
Funk reached out to fans in 2015 for financial assistance in light of undisclosed circumstances. After an outpouring of support, he released a "thank you" album, Thank You for Your Consideration in appreciation.

Funk released a new album on February 19, 2016, called Traditional Synthesizer Music. This album was the product of Funk's experimentations with modular synthesizers, and was created exclusively on modular synthesizer hardware.

In 2017, Funk announced a collaboration with Daniel Lanois. This was recorded in Toronto and released in 2018 as Venetian Snares x Daniel Lanois.

In 2025, Funk released his first new solo material since 2018, the single Drums, as part of a Planet Mu 30 year anniversary compilation album. Later in that year, he contributed drum programming to Spanish singer Rosalía's song "Reliquia", the second track off her third studio album Lux.

== Musical style ==
Funk is well known for using odd time signatures, especially 7/4. For instance, the track "Szamár Madár" from Rossz Csillag Alatt Született uses a sample from Edward Elgar's Cello Concerto, edited into a 7/4 time signature. The album Thank You for Your Consideration also employs unusual meters instead of the 4/4 time used in most electronic music.

== Discography ==
=== Studio albums ===
- Fake, Impossible. (1997, self-release)
- Spells (1998, self-release)
- Subvert! (1998, self-release)
- Rorschach Stuffocate (1999, self-release)
- printf("shiver in eternal darkness/n"); (2000, Isolate Records; 2013 re-issue, self-release)
- Songs About My Cats (2001, Planet Mu)
- Doll Doll Doll (2001, Hymen Records)
- Higgins Ultra Low Track Glue Funk Hits 1972–2006 (2002, Planet Mu)
- Winter in the Belly of a Snake (2002, Planet Mu)
- The Chocolate Wheelchair Album (2003, Planet Mu)
- Huge Chrome Cylinder Box Unfolding (2004, Planet Mu)
- Winnipeg Is a Frozen Shithole (2005, Sublight Records)
- Rossz Csillag Alatt Született (2005, Planet Mu)
- Meathole (2005, Planet Mu)
- Cavalcade of Glee and Dadaist Happy Hardcore Pom Poms (2006, Planet Mu)
- My Downfall (Original Soundtrack) (2007, Planet Mu)
- Detrimentalist (2008, Planet Mu)
- Filth (2009, Planet Mu)
- My So-Called Life (2010, Timesig)
- Live at WTW 07 (AKA Return of the Snare) – June 15, 2001 (2013, Addict Records)
- My Love Is a Bulldozer (2014, Planet Mu)
- Thank You for Your Consideration (2015, self-released)
- Traditional Synthesizer Music (2016, Planet Mu)
- She Began to Cry Tears of Blood Which Became Little Brick Houses When They Hit the Ground (2018, self-released)
- Greg Hates Car Culture (2019, Timesig)^{1}

^Note 1This album was originally released as a 1999 EP, but was reissued in 2019 as an album
