= Breakcore =

Style of electronic dance music

- A breakcore sample
- Stylistic origins: Hardcore; jungle; drum and bass; gabber; drill 'n' bass; IDM; digital hardcore; electro-industrial
- Cultural origins: Mid-1990s, Australia, Europe, UK

Subgenres
- Raggacore; Mashcore

Other topics
- Power noise; breakbeat hardcore

Breakcore is a style of electronic dance music that emerged from jungle, hardcore, and drum & bass in the mid-to-late 1990s. It is characterized by very complex and intricate breakbeats and a wide palette of sampling sources played at high tempos, though there is much debate in the breakcore subculture as to what breakcore itself is.

== History ==
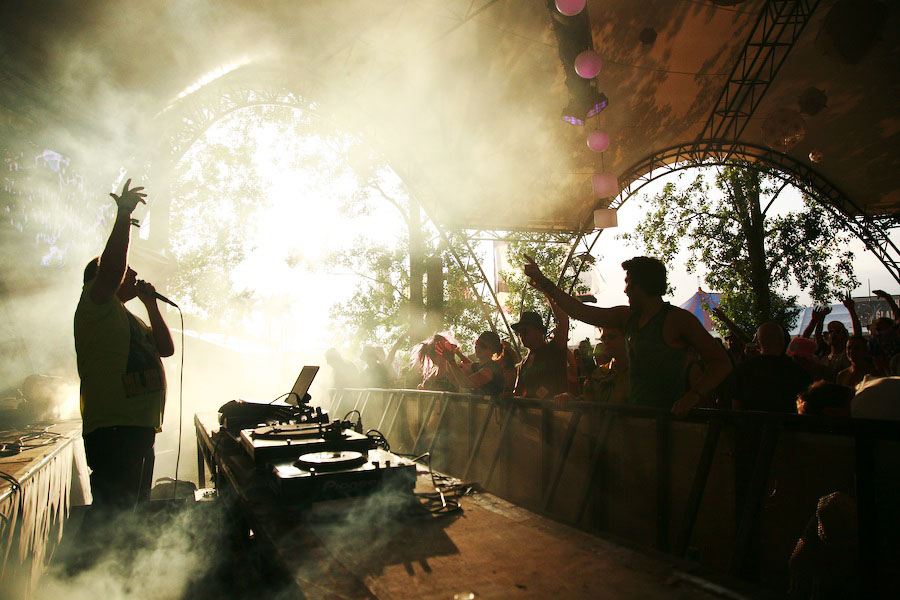
American breakcore DJ Donna Summer performing live at Glastonbury Festival, UK

As the early days of "hardcore techno" or just "hardcore" began to settle in Europe, breakcore as a genre began to take more concrete forms in other parts of the world. The genre began to split into its own separate scene around 1990–1994. Inspired by new labels such as Addict, from Milwaukee, US; Peace Off from Rennes, France; Sonic Belligeranza from Bologna, Italy; and Planet Mu, from London, it began to take a new shape, adding in more elements of mashup and IDM. to the hardcore sounds. Each of these labels began to draw in aspects of their own social and aesthetic scenes, allowing for an even broader definition of what was possible in the music.

In Europe, the breakcore genre was solidified by raves and club events such as Belgium's Breakcore Gives Me Wood, featuring local acts such as UndaCova and Sickboy; Breakcore A Go Go, in the Netherlands, which was run by FFF and Bong-Ra; as well as Anticartel, in Rennes, the seat of PeaceOff, and later, Wasted in Berlin and Bangface in London.

Breakcore has been subject to changing and branching. Many newer breakcore artists (such as Mochipet etc.) focus on melodic progressions and complex drum programming while other artists still focus on distorted hardcore breakbeats and dark-edged musical influences (such as heavy metal and industrial). The artist Venetian Snares has produced breakcore blended with elements of classical music. Other artists such as Shitmat, Sickboy, DJ Scotch Egg, and Drop the Lime take another direction towards mash-up, happy hardcore, and rave to make a lighter, more humorous sound. The rise of Chiptune music has also blended with breakcore with artists such as Tarmvred. The UK free party scene has also expressed a large interest in producing and distributing its own takes on breakcore, with crews and labels such as Life4land, Hekate, Headfuk, and Bad Sekta helping to push the scene and sound forward, as well as bringing over a number of international artists to play at their parties and club nights. Breakcore is steadily gaining in popularity, and aspiring artists are found scattered across the Internet.

The breakcore scene, from its early days, has included lively debate on what is or is not breakcore, with the idea of authenticity in breakcore often tied to its inaccessibility to the general public and lack of commercial viability. In a documentary in 2006, Andrew Forrest said that the breakcore scene was "largely based on the internet."

Sociologist Andrew Whelan notes that Venetian Snares, who was influential in popularizing breakcore in the mid-2000s, had become "synonymous with breakcore such that alternative styles are being sidelined." He adds that breakcore is the best example of a music genre whose development is intrinsically linked to online and peer-to-peer distribution.

=== 2020s revival ===
In the 2020s breakcore underwent a revival, bringing with it a noticeably different sound than the music produced in the 1990s and 2000s. According to Bandcamp Daily writer James Gui, 2020s breakcore is nostalgic, atmospheric, and sentimental, and grew out of the digital hardcore scene of the 2010s. It is accompanied by an aesthetic that draws from video games, anime, internet culture, and the Y2K aesthetic with artists such as Machine Girl and Goreshit being influential to the revival's aesthetic and sound.

== Characteristics ==
The most defining characteristic of breakcore is the drum work, which is often based on the manipulation of the Amen break and other classic jungle and hip-hop breaks at high BPM. The techniques applied to achieve this differ from musician to musician, some preferring to cut up and rearrange the breaks, while others merely distort and loop breaks or apply various effects such as delay and chorus to alter the break's timbre.

Melodically, there is nothing that defines breakcore. Classic rave sounds such as acid bass lines, Hoovers and Reese bass are common, but breakcore is mostly known for sampling sounds from all over the musical spectrum to accommodate the frantic and fast-paced nature of the rhythm section. Around the turn of the century, more and more breakcore musicians began employing traditional synthesis techniques to compose elaborate melodies and harmonies. There are a growing number of musicians who make use of recorded live instrumentation in their music, such as Istari Lasterfahrer, Hecate, Benn Jordan, Ruby My Dear, Qüatros, Venetian Snares, Drumcorps (who integrated grindcore influences into breakcore), and Igorrr.

According to Simon Reynolds of The New York Times, "purveyed by artists like DJ/Rupture and Teamshadetek, the [breakcore] music combines rumbling bass lines, fidgety beats and grainy ragga vocals to create a home-listening surrogate for the 'bashment' vibe of a Jamaican sound system party. Others within the breakcore genre, like Knifehandchop, Kid606 and Soundmurderer, hark back to rave's own early days, their music evoking the rowdy fervor of a time when huge crowds flailed their limbs to a barrage of abstract noise and convulsive rhythm. It's a poignant aural mirage of a time when techno music was made for the popular vanguard rather than a connoisseurial elite, as it is today."

=== Raggacore ===
Raggacore is a style of music derived from ragga jungle that somewhat predates breakcore, characterized by ragga and dancehall rhythms and vocals. Its roots can arguably be traced back to jungle producer Remarc, who was one of the first producers to mix ragga and dancehall vocals with chaotic and intricately rearranged break beats. While only a few producers primarily work in the style, it still has a sizable following among breakcore fans. Notable releases in this style include those by Aaron Spectre and Bong-Ra.

=== Mashcore ===
The term "mashcore" was coined by English breakcore artist Shitmat to describe his music such as his track "There's No Business Like Propa' Rungleclotted Mashup Bizznizz". Mashcore primarily draws from the mashup genre of music and shows an irreverence towards the idea that free or pirated music is worthless.

== Influences ==
In London, DJ Scud co-founded Ambush Records in late 1996 with fellow producer Aphasic to focus on more extreme noise-oriented hardcore drum and bass. Some artists released on Ambush are Christoph Fringeli, Slepcy, The Panacea, and Noize Creator. "Scud and Nomex tracks like 'Total Destruction' helped create the blueprint for much of breakcore's sound, a high-bpm mash-up of hyperkinetic, post-jungle breaks, feedback, noise, and Jamaican elements paired with a devil-may-care attitude towards sampling that pulls from the broadest musical spectrum of styles (hip-hop, rock, industrial, pop, and beyond)."

At the same time, Bloody Fist Records based in Newcastle, Australia, released many records of hardcore/gabber, industrial, and noise. Artists signed to Bloody Fist in its lifetime include Syndicate, Xylocaine, Epsilon and Nasenbluten. Label founder Mark Newlands said, in 1997, "I think that the uncomfortableness also comes from a reaction towards the mainstream and popular culture that's constantly shoved down our throats, that's forced on the people via television, radio, mass media, etc. I think that also fuels the fire and keeps the aggressiveness there and the uncomfortableness." Newlands described their music as products of "cut'n'paste mentality" and an industrial environment. In her Experimental Music, Gail Priest credits the label as recognized globally for its contributions to the breakcore genre, and for spurring its 1990s development. The Bloody Fist sound became breakcore from what was the noise genre, with added elements of high beats per minute and "extreme, thick, low-fi textures". By way of example, Nasenbluten's 1996 Fuck Anna Wood exemplified this style with controversial public affairs audio samples collaged into dialogue atop early hardcore beats.

Formed in 1994, Digital Hardcore Recordings released music by artists such as Alec Empire, Shizuo, Atari Teenage Riot, EC8OR, and Bomb20, shaping the breakcore sound. This label is also responsible for digital hardcore, a genre developed simultaneously to breakcore.
