= Planet Mu =

British record label

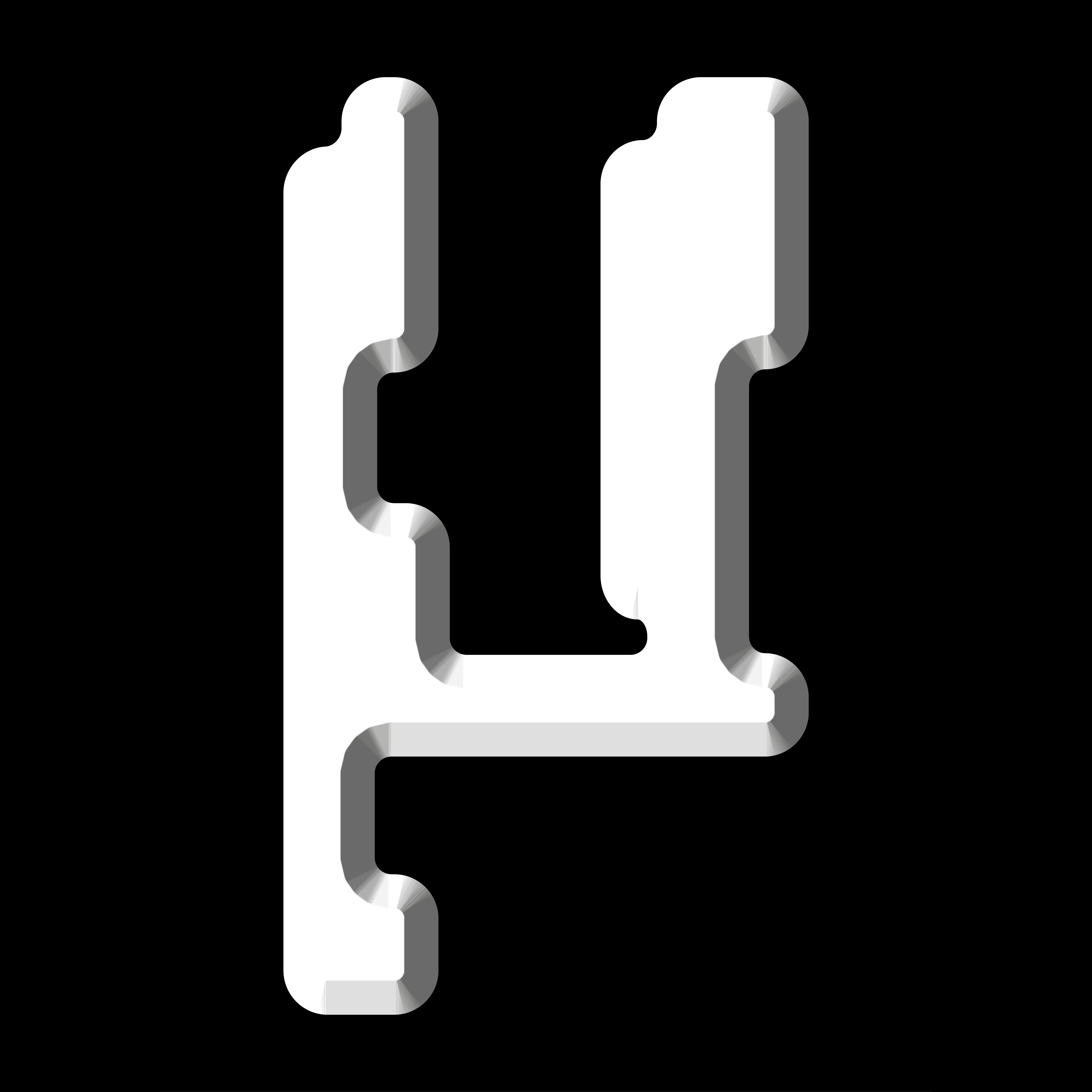
- Parent company: Virgin Records (until 1998)
- Founded: 1995
- Founder: Mike Paradinas
- Distributors: Cargo (Europe + R.O.W), Redeye USA (North America and Canada)
- Genre: IDM, dubstep, breakcore, footwork, grime
- Country of origin: England
- Location: England
- Official website: http://www.planet.mu

Planet Mu is an English electronic music record label created and run by Mike Paradinas, also known as μ-Ziq. The label started out as a subsidiary of Virgin Records then Paradinas set up the label independent of Virgin. After releasing intelligent dance music, the label moved to jungle and breakcore, and then grime and dubstep and later footwork. The label also releases the music of Paradinas under various aliases such as μ-Ziq, Kid Spatula, and Tusken Raiders. It celebrated its 30th anniversary in 2025.

== Beginning ==
When Mike Paradinas signed as a musician to Virgin Records in the mid-1990s, Paradinas was asked for suggestions for the new dance subsidiary and suggested Planet Mu as a play on Carl Craig's label Planet E. When Virgin lost interest in the project, Paradinas took it over. He quickly drew critical acclaim for releasing a string of important IDM (intelligent dance music) records, from artists such as Jega, Leafcutter John, Luke Vibert and Venetian Snares. The label also releases Paradinas's music under a range of aliases including Kid Spatula, Tusken Raiders, and μ-Ziq, establishing itself as an electronic music label to rival Skam Records and Warp Records.

== Progression ==
As the new decade began, Planet Mu began to release jungle and breakcore records from artists such as 0=0, Tim Exile and Shitmat. Later in the decade, Paradinas moved towards grime and dubstep, signing artists such as Boxcutter, Milanese, Mr. Mitch, Pinch, Vex'd, and Virus Syndicate. In 2006, the label released three Warrior Dubz compilations curated by Mary Anne Hobbs. In the 2010s, Planet Mu changed direction again, releasing the footwork compilation Bangs & Works Vol. 1 which featured DJ Rashad and brought the Chicago genre to wider attention. Bangs & Works Vol. 2 came out the following year and launched the career of Jlin.

In 2020, the label celebrated its 25th birthday. In 2019 it had not made a profit but in 2020 during the COVID-19 pandemic, sales went up. It released the compilation PlanetMμ25 which featured grime from East Man & Streema, pop from RUI-HO, IDM from Bogdan Raczynski and jazz from Jana Rush.

== See also ==
- List of electronic music record labels
