= Szkieve =

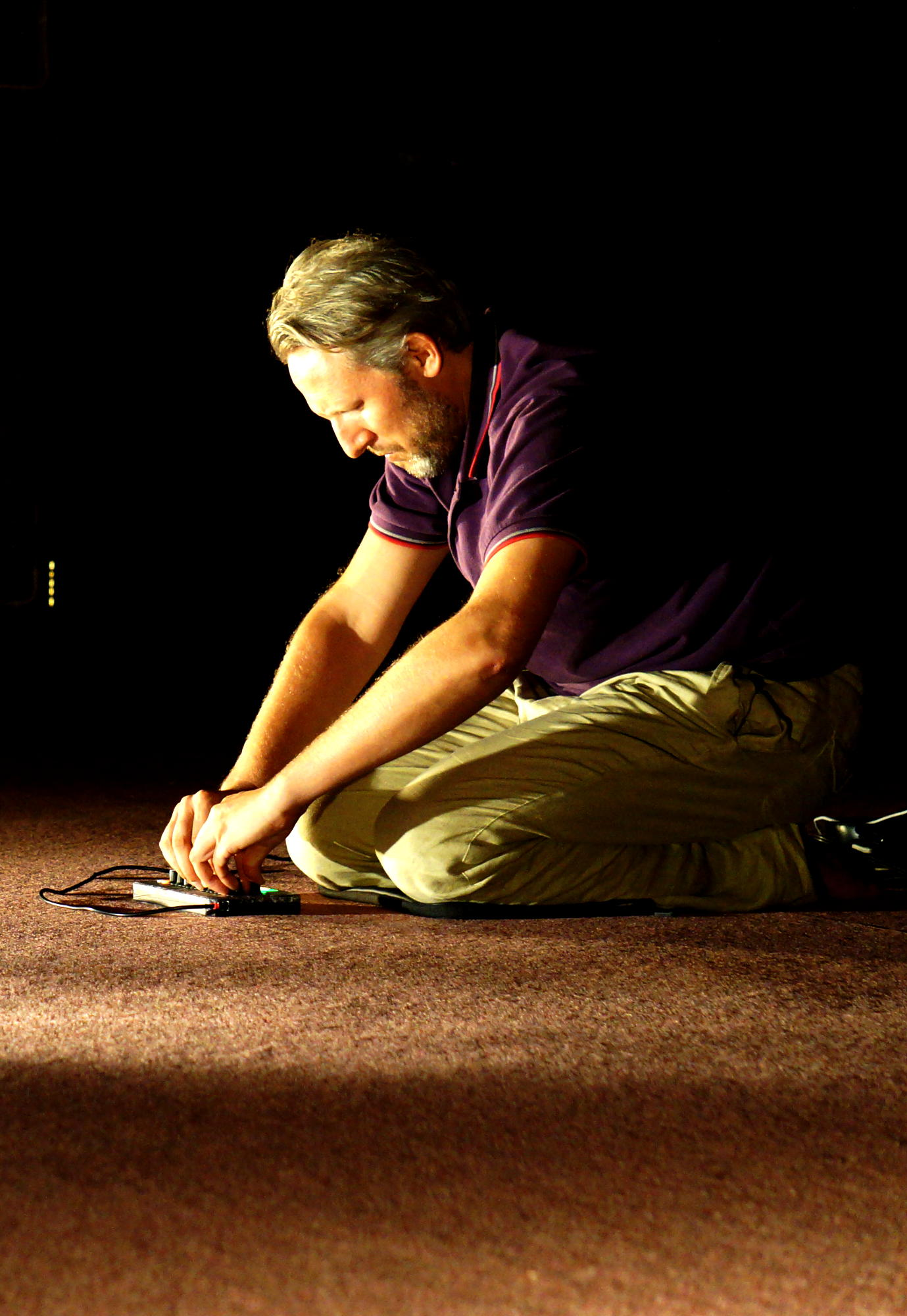
- Szkieve at Lokananta Studios, Indonesia, December 2014

Background information
- Also known as: Dimitri della Faille, Montagnn, Foe
- Origin: Montreal, Quebec, Canada
- Genres: Experimental, Electroacoustic, Noise music
- Years active: 1997–present
- Labels: Hushush; Ant-Zen; Ad Noiseam; Rape Art Productions; Antena
- Website: szkieve.org

Szkieve is the stage name of Dimitri della Faille (born in Belgium). Szkieve is a pioneering ambient musician and new media artist. He has been performing electronic experimental and noise music since 1997. In 2017, he was co-awarded the prestigious Golden Nica Prix Ars Electronica in digital musics and sound art.

== Music ==
Szkieve has half a dozen releases, on vinyl and CD, on various record labels from North America and Europe such as Hushush, Ad Noiseam and Ant-Zen. More recently the seminal label from Ecuador, Rape Art Productions has released a full-length CD by Szkieve and Antena, a netlabel from Brazil has released a live show recorded at Plano B in Lapa, Rio de Janeiro.

His music consist of "minimalist percussions" with "diluted glitches" being "delicately mixed". It has been described as being "rich and deep, frozen melodies break through tinny clicks and gloomy buzzes" containing "drones, whirs and familiar yet hypnotic textures". It has been said that in his releases, "sharp, shrill electronic tones and analog synthesizer miasma cut through the sounds of slowly chiming bells".

He performs live with computer software, various child toys, found objects, contact microphones, electromagnetic microphones (telephone pick-ups) and personal digital assistants. Szkieve has presented his work in about twenty countries of Europe, North and South America, and Asia. He played at digital arts and electronic music festivals such as Electric Fields, Elektra, Mois Multi, MUTEK, MUTEK.cl, Send + Receive, WSK Festival and ZuiDianZi Festival.

== Collaborations ==
Szkieve is part of the Popcore collective. He has collaborated on stage or recorded with artists such as Ammo, Ned Bouhalassa, Andrew Duke, Cedrik Fermont, Imminent, Industria Masoquista, John Sellekaers, martiensgohome, The Observatory, Silk Saw, Wukir Suryadi, Torturing Nurse, Vromb and Yoyooyoy. Szkieve also collaborated with visual artists and film artists such as Zev Asher, Gene Kogan, Alex McKenzie, Mark Nugent and TIND.

== New media arts ==
Szkieve is also active in the New media art scene. In 2003, he participated in the project Clicks'n'Cars which saw musicians performing with car frames "attached to the ceiling and become loudspeakers by sending amplified sound". He has presented sound art projects such as his Miniatures Express, a project involving model railways, in various festivals. With Montréal visual artist TIND, he presented an audio-visual performance entitled "Lucifer" at various festivals in 2011–2012. In reviews, the performance has been described as "audacious, hypnotizing, alienating, leaving out of breath".

== Other work in the arts ==
Della Faille founded the Hushush independent record label in 1998. For several years, he maintained the website and mailing list for the influential Belgian electronic body music band, Front 242. He was also webmaster for prominent electronic bands such as Dead Voices on Air, Not Breathing and The Tear Garden.

Della Faille sits on the artistic committee of the ACREQ (Association pour la création et la recherche électroacoustiques du Québec - The Association for the Creation and Research of Electroacoustic of Quebec). He holds a PhD in Sociology and is a professor in international development at the Université du Québec en Outaouais. And he has published scientific work on music and arts. In 2016, with experimental musician Cedrik Fermont, he co-wrote "Not Your World Music" a book on noise music in Southeast Asia.

== Awards ==
- 2017 : "Golden Nica" by Prix Ars Electronica co-awarded with Cedrik Fermont for their research on noise music in Southeast Asia.

== Discography ==
=== Solo releases ===
- Des Germes de Quelque Chose, CD, 2000
- Des Rythmes de Passage, CD, 2003
- Palimpseste, MP3, 2004
- Ekranoplanes, CDEP, 2005
- Ao Vivo No Plano B 21 Julho, MP3, 2006
- Chants et Danses Folkloriques des Hauts Plateaux, CD, 2008

=== Collaborations and split releases ===
- Perturbacée / Terra Amata, 12", 2002 (split with Ammo)
- Le Pavillon des Oiseaux / Le Monorail, 7", 2003 (collaboration with Vromb)
- Ostinato 29, CDr, 2008 (split with Nathan McNinch & Sonde)
