= Cedrik Fermont =

- Also known as: Kirdec, C-drík Fermont
- Origin: Lubumbashi, Katanga, Zaire
- Genres: Alternative hip hop, ambient, breakcore, digital hardcore, drone, electro, electroacoustic, electronic, electronica, experimental, industrial, minimal wave, noise, power electronics, power noise, sound art
- Occupations: Audio mastering engineer, archivist, composer, dj, lecturer, musician, producer
- Instruments: Drums, sampling, computer
- Years active: 1989–present
- Labels: Ad Noiseam; Ant-Zen; Disques Hushush; Flyco; Hymen Records; Independenza Records; Klanggalerie; Mad Monkey Records; Mirex; Old Europa Cafe; PuZZling Rec.; Sépulkrales Katakombes; Syrphe; Textolux; Vacuum
- Website: syrphe.com

Cedrik Fermont (also known as C-drík Fermont or Kirdec) is a vegan artist, academically trained musician, DJ, singer, composer and drummer. He is a former student of electro-acoustic composer Annette Vande Gorne (Royal Conservatory of Mons, Belgium). In 2017, he was co-awarded the prestigious Golden Nica Prix Ars Electronica in digital music and sound art.

== Biography ==
Of Greek, Zairian and Belgian descent, born in Congo (former Zaire) C-drík grew up in Belgium and also lived in the Netherlands. He is an eternal voyager, a "noise nomad", a "musical archivist". He has performed in numerous countries across North America, Europe, the Middle-East, Africa and Asia. He started his first project in 1989 and juggles in between many projects and electronic genres. He is also a label manager and concert organizer who produces his own projects and experimental artists who predominantly originate from Asia and Africa on the labels Syrphe and Textolux.

C-drík is a noted researcher on the history of experimental and extreme music in Africa and in Asia. He has written essays and given many conferences on the topic. In 2016, with sociologist and experimental musician Dimitri della Faille, he co-wrote a book on noise music in Southeast Asia.

== Collaborations ==
C-drík collaborated or still works together with the following artists [live and or studio] : Mick Harris, Mark Spybey, Mathis Mootz, David Thrussel, Planet Aldol, Sato Yukie, Nakamura Yuji, Yan Jun, Wu Quan, Itta, Daytripper, Mimetic, Ha Jane, Lee Han Joo, One Man Nation, Mindfuckingboy (Shaun Sankaran), Cliquetpar, B6, 718, Contagious Orgasm, Naofumi Ishimaru, Goh Lee Kwang, Lau Mun Leng, Li Chin Sung, Xavier Depienne, Le diktat, Error, Gisèle Pape, Gregory Durez, Tri Minh, Hùng Nguyễn Mạnh, Nguyễn Van Cuong, The Seventeen Migs of Spring, Olivier Moreau, John Sellekaers, Hervé Thomas, Gabriel Séverin, Marc Medea, Szkieve, Pei, Stereo warfare, Aluviana, Xabec.

== Visual arts ==
Connected to visual arts (he has also learnt declamation, theater and improvisations), he composes soundtracks for theater, exhibitions, sound installations, fashion shows and short movies (Blanc murmure, 3point5, RTBF, Télésambre, Babel Q Compagnie, Charleroi Danse / Frédéric Flamand, Giovani Guzzo, Les théâtres du mercredi in Belgium, Wim Reiff Gallery, B52, Kunsttour, in the Netherlands, Ðào Anh Khánh Studio in Vietnam, the Guangdong Modern Dance Company in China).

He composed and performed live two musical scores for the Sergei Eisenstein's mute films Strike in Riga, Latvia (at the festival Baltā Nakts) in 2006 and Battleship Potemkin in Dresden, Germany together with Xabec in 2009.

== Awards ==
- 2024 : Kunstpreis Berlin – Jubiläumsstiftung 1848/1948.
- 2017 : "Golden Nica" by Prix Ars Electronica co-awarded with Dimitri della Faille for their research on noise music in Southeast Asia.
- 2006 : Best soundtrack award at the film festival Côté court in Montreuil, France. The movie was directed by Gisèle Pape and edited on DVD by Ad Noiseam.

== Trivia ==
Between the years 2000 and 2002 C-drík used variations of his moniker for various compilation, increased by one letter of the alphabet for each new compilation. Aliases such as D-Drik, F-Drik, H-drík, J-drík, Kirdec, O-drik, Q-drík, R-Drik, V-drík, Y-drík are therefore variations of C-drík main alias.

== Discography ==
- Axiome, Črno klank – Théorie et progression, 1991, Tape
- Črno klank, M.E.3, Globuleux – Cloportes, 1992, Tape
- M.E.3 – Sombre novembre, 1992, Tape
- M.E.3 – Wat is vrijheid ? / Dada is(s)t Gott, 1993, Tape
- Črno klank – Actividad sonora 1994, Tape (split tape with M. Nomized)
- Deleted/C-drík – Hopeless dreams, 1994, Tape
- Deleted/C-drík – Hopeless dreams, 1998, Tape (split tape with Al & Del)
- Ambre – Enclave, 1998, CD
- Axiome – Rictus, 1999, CD
- Ambre & Mark Spybey – Sfumato, 2000, CD
- Moonsanto – Dogme, 2000, CD
- Ammo – The age of terminal irony, 2000 CD and 12"
- Dead Hollywood Stars – Gone west, 2000, CD
- Dead Hollywood Stars – Wagon of miracles, 2000, 12"
- Mick Harris & Ambre – Dys, 2001 CD
- Ammo – Kaleinoiscope, 2001, CD
- Ammo – Beautiful People, 2001, 7"
- XHM² – This anxious space, 2001, CD
- Moonsanto – Fraud, Hell, Dope, 2001, CD
- Moonsanto – Pesticide for ever kit, 2001, CD + C10
- Axiome – Ça ne nous rendra pas le Congo, 2002, CD
- C-drík – Dissolution, 2002' CD
- Ammo – Perturbacée / Terra Amata, 2002, 12" (split with Szkieve)
- Logatomistes – Ke-re-kö-kö-kokex, 2002, CD
- The Forsaken Odes Conglomarate – Tonal Tutorial, 2002, CD
- Martiens Go Home – Une occasion de chute, 2002, CD
- Dead Hollywood Stars – Junctions, 2002, CD
- Dead Hollywood Stars – Junctions / Gone West, 2002, CD
- Axiome – Va-t-il faire beau ?, 2002, 12"
- Ambre – Nebka / Térébrant, 2003, 7"
- Ambre – Le mensonge, 2003, CD
- Tetra Plok – Future marker, 2003, 7"
- Kirdec – Stadskantoor zero, 2003, 12"
- Črno Klank – État des lieux, 2003, CD
- Axiome – Il pleut des cordes, 2005, 12"
- Kirdec – Death to the macho, 2006, 12"
- Črno klank – Chéngyì, 2006, mp3
- Tetra plok – Fear of a blind date, 2007, 10"
- Kirdec – Killed by a coconut, 2007, CD
- Elekore – Voluntary human extinction, 2007, CD
- C-drík / Aluviana – Moje čelo, 2008, CD
- The klank of črno migs – Disturbing perceptions, 2008, CD
- Contagious Orgasm & C-drík – Journeys into time and space, 2008, CD
- Kirdec – Das Gemeinsame Schicksal, 2008, mini CD

== See also ==
- List of industrial music bands
- List of noise musicians
- List of vegans
