= Stygian Vistas =

EP by Soma
- Released: July 1, 1997
- Recorded: 1996–1997 at The Crypt
- Genre: Electronic
- Length: 44:01
- Label: Extreme

Soma chronology
The Inner Cinema (1996)	Stygian Vistas (1997)

Professional ratings
Review scores
Source	Rating
Allmusic	3.5/5 stars

Stygian Vistas is an EP by Soma, released on July 1, 1997, through Extreme Records.

== Track listing ==
All music is composed by Pieter Bourke and David Thrussell.

No.	Title	Length
1.	"Stygian Vista"	4:03
2.	"God Sends the Meat & the Devil Cooks (...And Cooks...And Cooks...)"	6:21
3.	"Amphibious Premonitions Bureau"	5:08
4.	"The Lost Mathematician"	4:39
5.	"The Olmec Enigma"	6:02
6.	"Stygian Vista" (Nonplace Urban Field mix)	4:58
7.	"Risen from Argatha" (François Tétaz mix)	4:54
8.	"Alchemical Nuptial" (Fetisch Park mix)	7:56

== Personnel ==
Soma

- Pieter Bourke – instruments
- David Thrussell – instruments

Production and additional personnel

- Boris Polonski – instruments on "Alchemical Nuptial"
- Soma – mastering, cover art
- François Tétaz – mastering
- Jacek Tuschewski – cover art
