= Hollow Earth (album) =

Studio album by Soma
- Released: 15 December 1994
- Recorded: 1993–1994 at The Crypt and Area 51
- Genre: Electronic
- Length: 74:03
- Label: Extreme

Soma chronology
Hollow Earth (1994)	The Inner Cinema (1996)

Professional ratings
Review scores
Source	Rating
Allmusic	3/5 stars

Hollow Earth is the debut album of Soma, released on 15 December 1994 through Extreme Records.

== Track listing ==
All music is composed by Pieter Bourke and David Thrussell.

No.	Title	Length
1.	"Soil Theme"	4:26
2.	"Soma Romanz"	7:59
3.	"Sleepwalker"	6:05
4.	"Nightsoil"	4:52
5.	"Corporate Anthem" (part 1)	4:37
6.	"God Sends the Meat and the Devil Cooks"	4:10
7.	"Corporate Anthem" (part 2)	3:22
8.	"Dark Koma"	6:06
9.	"The Subterranean"	4:15
10.	"The Black Lodge"	6:02
11.	"Soma Romanz" (clovus)	6:16
12.	"Nowhere Nothin' Fuck Up"	3:40
13.	"Hollow Earth"	12:13

== Personnel ==
- Pieter Bourke – instruments
- Rick O'Neil – mastering
- David Thrussell – instruments, mastering
