= The Inner Cinema =

Studio album by Soma
- Released: 1996
- Recorded: 1995–1996 at The Crypt and Area 51
- Genre: Electronic
- Length: 63:38
- Label: Extreme

Soma chronology
Hollow Earth (1994)	The Inner Cinema (1996)	Stygian Vistas (1997)

Professional ratings
Review scores
Source	Rating
Allmusic	3/5 stars

The Inner Cinema is the second album by Soma, released in 1996 through Extreme Records.

== Track listing ==
All music is composed by Pieter Bourke and David Thrussell, except "Baal" co-written by Craig Pilkington

No.	Title	Length
1.	"Stygian Vista"	7:26
2.	"Arcane"	5:43
3.	"The Golden Dawn"	5:58
4.	"The Drunken Atlantean"	3:37
5.	"Baal"	6:07
6.	"The Collector"	5:43
7.	"Risen from Argatha"	6:12
8.	"Antediluvian"	4:28
9.	"Alchemical Nuptial"	8:38
10.	"Shambhala"	4:45
11.	"Endless"	5:01

== Personnel ==
Soma

- Pieter Bourke – instruments
- David Thrussell – instruments

Production and additional personnel

- Leigh Ashforth – cover art
- Soma – mastering, cover art
- François Tétaz – mastering
