= Soma (band) =

Australian band

- Origin: Australia
- Genres: Dark ambient, techno
- Years active: 1993–2001
- Label: Extreme
- Spinoff of: Eden; Snog
- Past members: Pieter Bourke; David Thrussell

Soma is the dark ambient and techno musical project of Australian composers David Thrussell and Pieter Bourke. The collaboration began in 1993 when Thrussell approached Bourke about the possibility of remixing Eden tracks. The Eden remixing sessions yielded the first Soma compositions. Soma developed into a full-time project when Bourke moved in with Thrussell after a fire had destroyed his flat, allowing the two more time to work together. Their debut album Hollow Earth was issued on Extreme Records in 1994 and was well-received critically, with Dave Thompson of the Alternative Press comparing it favorably to Kraftwerk's late seventies material.

== Discography ==
Studio albums

- Hollow Earth (1994, Extreme)
- The Inner Cinema (1996, Extreme)

EPs

- Soma (1993, Mumbo Jumbo)
- Stygian Vistas (1997, Extreme)
- My Ancient Vihmaana (2001, Karmic Hit)
