= Healingbow =

EP by Eden
- Released: 1993
- Recorded: April 1993–June 1993 at Toyland Studios, Melbourne
- Genre: Darkwave
- Length: 27:50
- Label: Projekt
- Producer: Eden

Eden chronology
Gateway to the Mysteries (1990)	Healingbow (1993)	Fire & Rain (1995)

Professional ratings
Review scores
Source	Rating
Allmusic	4/5 stars

Healingbow is an EP by Eden. It was released in 1993 through Projekt Records.

== Track listing ==
All tracks are written by Eden

No.	Title	Length
1.	"Our Scent Rides the Breeze"	4:14
2.	"Healingbow"	4:13
3.	"Melancholia"	4:47
4.	"Dreaming Among Stones"	3:46
5.	"Dreamwheel"	5:32
6.	"Weaving Woman"	5:18

== Personnel ==
Eden

- Pieter Bourke – percussion, keyboards, hammered dulcimer, programming
- Sean Bowley – vocals, guitar, keyboards

Production and additional personnel

- Don Bartley – mastering, engineering
- Tim Blake – cello
- Julia Bourke – photography, design
- Adam Calaitzis – engineering
- Julia Bourke – art direction, design
- Eden – production
- Vanessa Meckes – photography
- Chris von Menge – photography
- David Thrussell – additional drums on "Healingbow" and "Melancholia"
- Brian Westbrook – cello
