= DVOA =

DVOA can refer to:

- Dead Voices on Air
- Defense-adjusted Value Over Average; see Football Outsiders
- Delaware Valley Orienteering Association
