= Dead Hollywood Stars =

Electronic music project

- Origin: Montreal, Quebec, Canada; Belgium
- Genre: Electronic
- Years active: 2000
- Members: John Sellekaers
- Past members: Cedrik Fermont; Hervé Thomas

Dead Hollywood Stars is a cross-genre electronic music project of the Canadian musician John Sellekaers. Because of its use of guitars and nostalgic atmospheres journalists have compared the project's sound to the work of Italian composer Ennio Morricone.

== History ==
The first Dead Hollywood Stars album, Gone West, explored country and western themes and was released in 2000 through the Mad Monkey label.

In 2002, the group released Junction on CD. A BBC Music review described the album's sound as cinematic and lush.

Their 2005 album, Smoke and Mirrors, incorporated a more pop-oriented style and featured contributions from guitarist Quentin de Hemptinne and drummer Alex Grousset.

== Past members ==
Past members of Dead Hollywood Stars have included: Cedrik Fermont and Hervé Thomas.

== Discography ==
- Gone West, 2000, CD
- Wagon of Miracles, 2000, 12"
- Junctions, 2002, CD
- Junctions/Gone West, 2002, 2xCD
- Smoke and Mirrors, 2005, CDEP
