= Frankie Pett Presents... The Happy Submarines =

Frankie Pett Presents the Happy Submarines Playing the Music of Dead Voices On Air

Studio album by Dead Voices on Air
- Released: 2000
- Recorded: 1999–2000 at #302, Watershed and Miller Block in Vancouver, British Columbia, Canada and Klaverland, Netherlands. Track 4 recorded live at Moritzbastei, Leipzig, Germany, February 2000.
- Genre: Experimental
- Length: 53:49
- Label: Invisible Records
- Producer: Mark Spybey

Dead Voices on Air chronology
Piss Frond (1999)	Frankie Pett Presents the Happy Submarines Playing the Music of Dead Voices On Air (2000)	Live (2001)

Professional ratings
Review scores
Source	Rating
Allmusic	4/5 stars

Frankie Pett Presents the Happy Submarines Playing the Music of Dead Voices On Air is a 2000 album by Dead Voices on Air.

== Track listing ==
No.	Title	Length
1.	"Introduction"	0:07
2.	"Zeehond"	2:57
3.	"Dogger"	3:15
4.	"Bored Of Canada"	6:00
5.	"Mk Nt 37 G/H/I Class"	2:50
6.	"Dolfijn"	5:52
7.	"Wet Fire Cotton"	5:21
8.	"Son Of The Adding Machine"	7:39
9.	"Sweet Garbage Streets"	9:48
10.	"The Brother Casio"	5:02
11.	"Ice Cream For Girl"	4:58
Total length:		53:49

== Credits ==
- Mark Spybey - vocals, trumpet, toys, drums, keyboards, sampler, effects, composer, engineer, producer
- Frank Verschuuren - engineer and producer (tracks 1, 2, 7, 11), composer (tracks 2, 7, 11)
- Darryl Neudorf - engineer and producer (tracks 2, 3, 7), composer (tracks 2, 3, 4, 7), drums (track 4), guitar and bass (track 7)
- Bert Van Hoorn - vocals and text (track 1)
- Niels Van Hoorn - saxophone (track 7), voice sounds and flute (track 11), composer (tracks 7, 11)
- Bradley Dunn-Klerxs - drums, composer (track 2)
- Frankie Pett - vocals (track 4), mixing (track 11), co-producer, executive producer
- Darren Phillips - keyboards, composer (track 4)
- Michael Rother - recording (track 4)
- Mark Nugent
