= Piss Frond =

Studio album by Dead Voices on Air
- Released: 1999
- Recorded: Disc 1 1998 at Miller Block, Disc 2 1997 at #302-Watershed (Vancouver, Canada)
- Genre: Experimental
- Length: 106:25
- Label: Invisible Records
- Producer: Mark Spybey, Abintra (Disc 1)

Dead Voices on Air chronology
How Hollow Heart... (1997)	Piss Frond (1999)	Frankie Pett Presents... The Happy Submarines (2000)

Piss Frond is a double CD 1999 album by Dead Voices on Air.

== Track listing ==
Disc 1
No.	Title	Length
1.	"Geong G'uma"	5:15
2.	"The Durrow Book"	6:10
3.	"Sulphur"	5:00
4.	"Red Kerre"	4:56
5.	"Foss Maerum"	5:28
6.	"Caw Gap"	4:41
7.	"Swan Flax"	11:33
8.	"Castered Carts"	3:53
Total length:		46:56

Disc 2
No.	Title	Length
1.	"On Hare Hill"	25:24
2.	"Of Hare Hill"	11:56
3.	"Arbeia"	1:14
4.	"Pons Aelius"	2:29
5.	"Voss Pilae"	3:31
6.	"Aesica"	1:54
7.	"Irthing Fell"	9:59
8.	"Incthuthil"	3:02
Total length:		59:29

== Credits ==
- Mark Spybey - composer, performer, artwork, producer
- Darryl Neudorf - sounds (tracks 1–8)
- Sugarpill (Tracy Pillsworth) - Moog synthesizer (track 1), ARP Chroma (tracks 1, 4, 5), Roland Rhythm 77 (track 3), outro voice (track 2), vocals (tracks 4, 8)
- Abintra (Darryl Neudorf and Sugarpill) - co-producer (tracks 1–8)
- Finn Manniche - cello (tracks 3, 4, 6)
- Alexander Varty - guitar (tracks 1–3, 5, 7, 8)
- Thomas Anselmi - guitar (track 1)
- Chris Houston - guitar (track 1)
- Ryan Moore - drums (tracks 1, 2), bass (tracks 5, 7)
- Peter Bourne - drums (track 7)
