= Golden Globe Award for Best Original Score =

Award

Golden Globe for Best Original Score
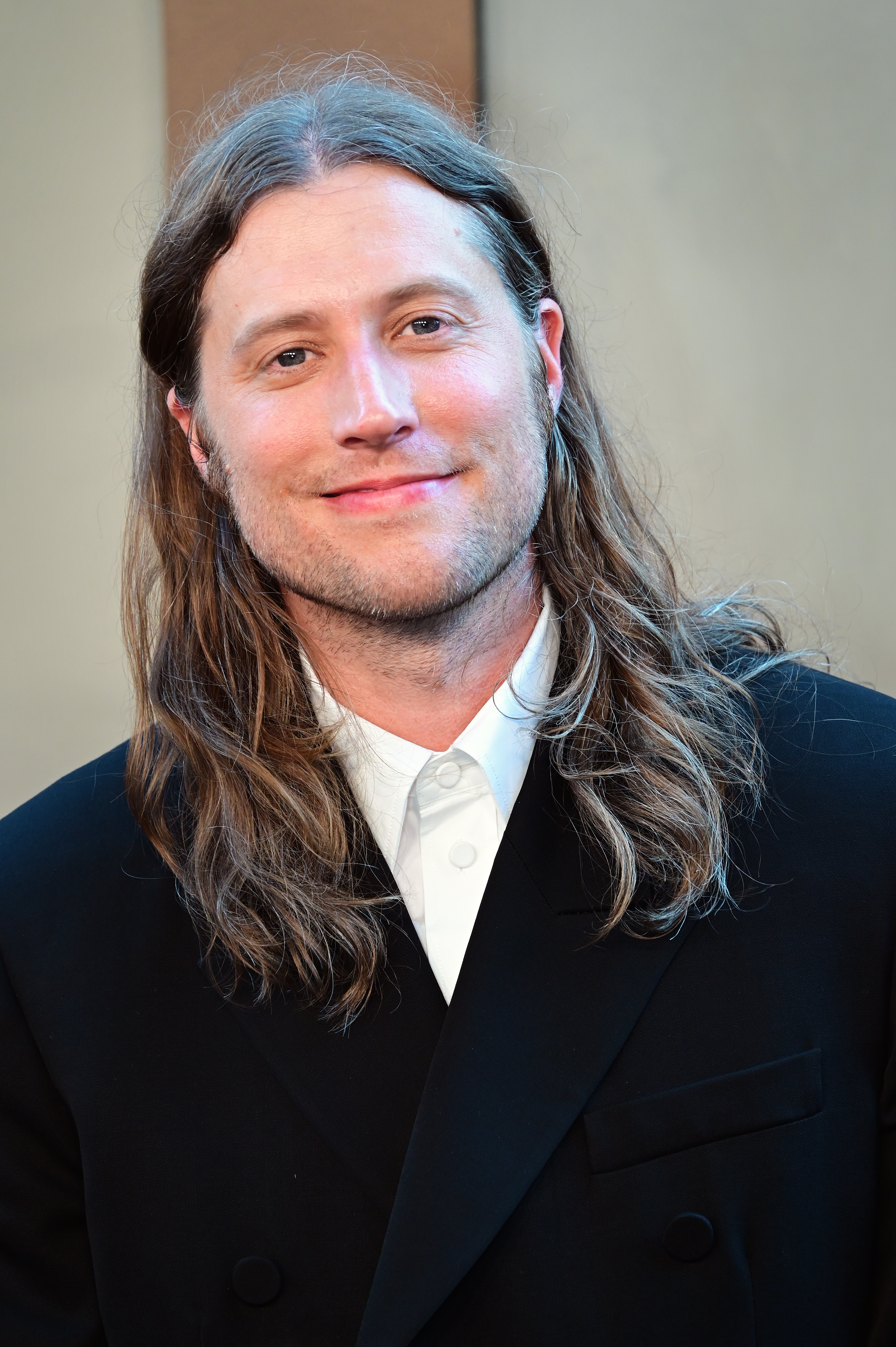
- Current award holder: Ludwig Göransson
- Awarded for: Best Score Written for a Motion Picture
- Location: United States
- Presented by: Dick Clark Productions
- Currently held by: Ludwig Göransson for Sinners (2025)
- Website: goldenglobes.com

The Golden Globe Award for Best Original Score is a Golden Globe Award presented by the Hollywood Foreign Press Association (HFPA), an organization of journalists who cover the United States film industry, but are affiliated with publications outside North America, since its institution in 1947.

== History ==
Since the 5th Golden Globe Awards (1947), the award is presented annually, except from 1953 to 1958. The nominations from 1947 and 1948 are not available. The first Best Original Score award went to Max Steiner for his compositional work on Life with Father.

John Williams is the artist with the most nominations (24); those resulted in 4 wins. Dimitri Tiomkin had the same number of wins, but out of only 5 nominations. Other notable achievers include Maurice Jarre (10 nominations, 4 wins), Alan Menken (5 nominations, 3 wins), Hans Zimmer (15 nominations, 3 wins), Justin Hurwitz (3 nominations, 3 wins) and Alexandre Desplat (15 nominations, 2 wins).

Artists like Jerry Goldsmith (9 nominations) and Michel Legrand (7 nominations) were nominated several times but never received the award. Dimitri Tiomkin, Alan Menken and Howard Shore are the only composers to win two consecutive awards. Additionally, Dimitri Tiomkin received Special Achievement Awards for his services to film music in 1955 and 1957, as did Hugo Friedhofer in 1958. The most recent recipient of this award was Ludwig Göransson for Sinners.

== Winners and nominees ==
Key

Sign	Meaning
	Indicates the winner

=== 1940s ===
Year^{1}	Film	Composer(s)	Ref.
1947	Life with Father	Max Steiner	
1948	The Red Shoes	Brian Easdale	
1949	The Inspector General	Johnny Green	
1949	All the King's Men	Louis Gruenberg	

=== 1950s ===
Year^{1}	Film	Composer(s)	Ref.
1950	Sunset Boulevard	Franz Waxman	
1950	A Life of Her Own	Bronisław Kaper	
1950	Destination Moon	Leith Stevens	
1951	September Affair	Victor Young	
1951	The Day the Earth Stood Still	Bernard Herrmann	
1951	The Well	Dimitri Tiomkin	
1952	High Noon	Dimitri Tiomkin	
1952	Ivanhoe	Miklós Rózsa	
1952	The Quiet Man	Victor Young	
1953–1958	No award given		
1959	On the Beach	Ernest Gold	
1960	The Alamo	Dimitri Tiomkin	
1960	Exodus	Ernest Gold	
1960	Pepe	Johnny Green	
1960	Spartacus	Alex North	
1960	The World of Suzie Wong	George Duning	

=== 1960s ===
Year^{1}	Film	Composer(s)	Ref.
1961	The Guns of Navarone	Dimitri Tiomkin	
1961	El Cid	Miklós Rózsa	
1961	Fanny	Harold Rome	
1961	King of Kings	Miklós Rózsa	
1961	Summer and Smoke	Elmer Bernstein	
1962	To Kill a Mockingbird	Elmer Bernstein	
1962	Lawrence of Arabia	Maurice Jarre	
1962	Mutiny on the Bounty	Bronisław Kaper	
1962	Taras Bulba	Franz Waxman	
1962	The Music Man	Meredith Willson	
1963	No award given		
1964	The Fall of the Roman Empire	Dimitri Tiomkin	
1964	Becket	Laurence Rosenthal	
1964	Mary Poppins	Sherman Brothers	
1964	Seven Days in May	Jerry Goldsmith	
1964	Zorba the Greek (Alexis Zorbas)	Mikis Theodorakis	
1965	Doctor Zhivago	Maurice Jarre	
1965	Battle of the Bulge	Benjamin Frankel	
1965	The Great Race	Henry Mancini	
1965	The Sandpiper	Johnny Mandel	
1965	The Yellow Rolls-Royce	Riz Ortolani	
1966	Hawaii	Elmer Bernstein	
1966	A Man and a Woman	Francis Lai	
1966	Is Paris Burning? (Paris brûle-t-il?)	Maurice Jarre	
1966	The Bible: In the Beginning...	Toshiro Mayuzumi	
1966	The Sand Pebbles	Jerry Goldsmith	
1967	Camelot	Frederick Loewe	
1967	Doctor Dolittle	Leslie Bricusse	
1967	Live for Life (Vivre Pour Vivre)	Francis Lai	
1967	Thoroughly Modern Millie	Elmer Bernstein	
1967	Two for the Road	Henry Mancini	
1968	The Shoes of the Fisherman	Alex North	
1968	Chitty Chitty Bang Bang	Sherman Brothers	
1968	Oliver!	Lionel Bart (declared ineligible and removed from ballot)	
1968	Romeo and Juliet	Nino Rota	
1968	Rosemary's Baby	Krzysztof Komeda	
1968	The Lion in Winter	John Barry	
1968	The Thomas Crown Affair	Michel Legrand	
1969	Butch Cassidy and the Sundance Kid	Burt Bacharach	
1969	Anne of the Thousand Days	Georges Delerue	
1969	Goodbye, Mr. Chips	Leslie Bricusse	
1969	The Happy Ending	Michel Legrand	
1969	The Secret of Santa Vittoria	Ernest Gold	

=== 1970s ===
Year^{1}	Film	Composer(s)	Ref.
1970	Love Story	Francis Lai	
1970	Airport	Alfred Newman	
1970	Cromwell	Frank Cordell	
1970	Scrooge	Leslie Bricusse	
1970	Wuthering Heights	Michel Legrand	
1971	Shaft	Isaac Hayes	
1971	Le Mans	Michel Legrand	
1971	Mary, Queen of Scots	John Barry	
1971	Summer of '42	Michel Legrand	
1971	The Andromeda Strain	Gil Melle	
1972	The Godfather	Nino Rota	
1972	Frenzy	Ron Goodwin	
1972	The Getaway	Quincy Jones	
1972	Lady Sings the Blues	Michel Legrand	
1972	The Poseidon Adventure	John Williams	
1973	Jonathan Livingston Seagull	Neil Diamond	
1973	Breezy	Michel Legrand	
1973	Cinderella Liberty	John Williams	
1973	O Lucky Man!	Alan Price	
1973	The Day of the Dolphin	Georges Delerue	
1973	Tom Sawyer	Sherman Brothers, John Williams	
1974	The Little Prince	Alan Jay Lerner, Frederick Loewe	
1974	Chinatown	Jerry Goldsmith	
1974	Earthquake	John Williams	
1974	Phantom of the Paradise	Paul Williams	
1974	The Godfather Part II	Carmine Coppola, Nino Rota	
1975	Jaws	John Williams	
1975	Funny Lady	Fred Ebb, John Kander	
1975	The Man Who Would Be King	Maurice Jarre	
1975	The Other Side of the Mountain	Charles Fox	
1975	The Return of the Pink Panther	Henry Mancini	
1976	A Star is Born	Kenneth Ascher, Paul Williams	
1976	Bugsy Malone	Paul Williams	
1976	Rocky	Bill Conti	
1976	The Slipper and the Rose	Sherman Brothers	
1976	Voyage of the Damned	Lalo Schifrin	
1977	Star Wars	John Williams	
1977	Close Encounters of the Third Kind	John Williams	
1977	Pete's Dragon	Joel Hirschhorn, Al Kasha	
1977	Saturday Night Fever	Barry Gibb, Maurice Gibb, Robin Gibb, David Shire	
1977	The Spy Who Loved Me	Marvin Hamlisch	
1978	Midnight Express	Giorgio Moroder	
1978	An Unmarried Woman	Bill Conti	
1978	Superman	John Williams	
1978	The Children of Sanchez	Chuck Mangione	
1978	The Lord of the Rings	Leonard Rosenman	
1979	Apocalypse Now	Carmine Coppola, Francis Ford Coppola	
1979	10	Henry Mancini	
1979	A Little Romance	Georges Delerue	
1979	Alien	Jerry Goldsmith	
1979	The Black Stallion	Carmine Coppola	
1979	Star Trek: The Motion Picture	Jerry Goldsmith	
1979	The Amityville Horror	Lalo Schifrin	

=== 1980s ===
Year^{1}	Film	Composer(s)	Ref.
1980	The Stunt Man	Dominic Frontiere	
1980	American Gigolo	Giorgio Moroder	
1980	Fame	Michael Gore	
1980	Somewhere in Time	John Barry	
1980	The Empire Strikes Back	John Williams	
1980	The Competition	Lalo Schifrin	
1982	E.T. the Extra-Terrestrial	John Williams	
1982	Blade Runner	Vangelis	
1982	Cat People	Giorgio Moroder	
1982	Six Weeks	Dudley Moore	
1982	Victor/Victoria	Henry Mancini	
1983	Flashdance	Giorgio Moroder	
1983	Rumble Fish	Stewart Copeland	
1983	Scarface	Giorgio Moroder	
1983	Under Fire	Jerry Goldsmith	
1983	Yentl	Alan & Marilyn Bergman, Michel Legrand	
1984	A Passage to India	Maurice Jarre	
1984	Starman	Jack Nitzsche	
1984	Once Upon a Time in America	Ennio Morricone	
1984	The Killing Fields	Mike Oldfield	
1984	The River	John Williams	
1985	Out of Africa	John Barry	
1985	The Color Purple	Quincy Jones	
1985	White Nights	Michel Colombier	
1985	Witness	Maurice Jarre	
1985	Year of the Dragon	David Mansfield	
1986	The Mission	Ennio Morricone	
1986	Little Shop of Horrors	Miles Goodman	
1986	Round Midnight	Herbie Hancock	
1986	The Mosquito Coast	Maurice Jarre	
1986	Top Gun	Harold Faltermeyer	
1987	The Last Emperor	David Byrne, Ryuichi Sakamoto, Cong Su	
1987	Cry Freedom	George Fenton, Jonas Gwangwa	
1987	Empire of the Sun	John Williams	
1987	The Glass Menagerie	Henry Mancini	
1987	The Untouchables	Ennio Morricone	
1988	Gorillas in the Mist	Maurice Jarre	
1988	Madame Sousatzka	Gerald Gouriet	
1988	The Accidental Tourist	John Williams	
1988	The Last Temptation of Christ	Peter Gabriel	
1988	The Milagro Beanfield War	Dave Grusin	
1989	The Little Mermaid	Alan Menken	
1989	Born on the Fourth of July	John Williams	
1989	Casualties of War	Ennio Morricone	
1989	Glory	James Horner	
1989	The Fabulous Baker Boys	Dave Grusin	

=== 1990s ===
Year^{1}	Film	Composer(s)	Ref.
1990	The Sheltering Sky	Richard Horowitz, Ryuichi Sakamoto	
1990	Avalon	Randy Newman	
1990	Dances with Wolves	John Barry	
1990	Havana	Dave Grusin	
1990	The Godfather Part III	Carmine Coppola	
1991	Beauty and the Beast	Alan Menken	
1991	At Play in the Fields of the Lord	Zbigniew Preisner	
1991	Bugsy	Ennio Morricone	
1991	Dead Again	Patrick Doyle	
1991	For the Boys	Dave Grusin	
1991	Robin Hood: Prince of Thieves	Michael Kamen	
1992	Aladdin	Alan Menken	
1992	1492: Conquest of Paradise	Vangelis	
1992	Basic Instinct	Jerry Goldsmith	
1992	Chaplin	John Barry	
1992	The Last of the Mohicans	Randy Edelman, Trevor Jones	
1993	Heaven & Earth	Kitarō	
1993	Three Colors: Blue	Zbigniew Preisner	
1993	Schindler's List	John Williams	
1993	The Piano	Michael Nyman	
1993	The Nightmare Before Christmas	Danny Elfman	
1994	The Lion King	Hans Zimmer	
1994	Forrest Gump	Alan Silvestri	
1994	Interview with the Vampire	Elliot Goldenthal	
1994	Legends of the Fall	James Horner	
1994	Nell	Mark Isham	
1995	A Walk in the Clouds	Maurice Jarre	
1995	Braveheart	James Horner	
1995	Don Juan DeMarco	Michael Kamen	
1995	Pocahontas	Alan Menken	
1995	Sense and Sensibility	Patrick Doyle	
1996	The English Patient	Gabriel Yared	
1996	Michael Collins	Elliot Goldenthal	
1996	Shine	David Hirschfelder	
1996	The Hunchback of Notre Dame	Alan Menken	
1996	The Mirror Has Two Faces	Marvin Hamlisch	
1997	Titanic	James Horner	
1997	Gattaca	Michael Nyman	
1997	Kundun	Philip Glass	
1997	L.A. Confidential	Jerry Goldsmith	
1997	Seven Years in Tibet	John Williams	
1998	The Truman Show	Burkhard Dallwitz, Philip Glass	
1998	A Bug's Life	Randy Newman	
1998	Mulan	Jerry Goldsmith	
1998	Saving Private Ryan	John Williams	
1998	The Prince of Egypt	Stephen Schwartz, Hans Zimmer	
1999	The Legend of 1900	Ennio Morricone	
1999	American Beauty	Thomas Newman	
1999	Angela's Ashes	John Williams	
1999	Anna and the King	George Fenton	
1999	The End of the Affair	Michael Nyman	
1999	Eyes Wide Shut	Jocelyn Pook	
1999	The Insider	Pieter Bourke, Lisa Gerrard	
1999	The Straight Story	Angelo Badalamenti	
1999	The Talented Mr. Ripley	Gabriel Yared	

=== 2000s ===
Year^{1}	Film	Composer(s)	Ref.
2000	Gladiator	Hans Zimmer, Lisa Gerrard	
2000	All the Pretty Horses	Larry Paxton, Marty Stuart, Kristin Wilkinson	
2000	Chocolat	Rachel Portman	
2000	Crouching Tiger, Hidden Dragon (Wo hu cang long)	Tan Dun	
2000	Malèna	Ennio Morricone	
2000	Sunshine	Maurice Jarre	
2001	Moulin Rouge!	Craig Armstrong	
2001	A Beautiful Mind	James Horner	
2001	A.I. Artificial Intelligence	John Williams	
2001	Ali	Pieter Bourke, Lisa Gerrard	
2001	The Lord of the Rings: The Fellowship of the Ring	Howard Shore	
2001	Mulholland Drive	Angelo Badalamenti	
2001	Pearl Harbor	Hans Zimmer	
2001	The Shipping News	Christopher Young	
2002	Frida	Elliot Goldenthal	
2002	25th Hour	Terence Blanchard	
2002	Far from Heaven	Elmer Bernstein	
2002	Rabbit-Proof Fence	Peter Gabriel	
2002	The Hours	Philip Glass	
2003	The Lord of the Rings: The Return of the King	Howard Shore	
2003	Big Fish	Danny Elfman	
2003	Cold Mountain	Gabriel Yared	
2003	Girl With a Pearl Earring	Alexandre Desplat	
2003	The Last Samurai	Hans Zimmer	
2004	The Aviator	Howard Shore	
2004	Finding Neverland	Jan A. P. Kaczmarek	
2004	Million Dollar Baby	Clint Eastwood	
2004	Sideways	Rolfe Kent	
2004	Spanglish	Hans Zimmer	
2005	Memoirs of a Geisha	John Williams	
2005	Brokeback Mountain	Gustavo Santaolalla	
2005	King Kong	James Newton Howard	
2005	Syriana	Alexandre Desplat	
2005	The Chronicles of Narnia: The Lion, the Witch and the Wardrobe	Harry Gregson-Williams	
2006	The Painted Veil	Alexandre Desplat	
2006	Babel	Gustavo Santaolalla	
2006	Nomad	Carlo Siliotto	
2006	The Da Vinci Code	Hans Zimmer	
2006	The Fountain	Clint Mansell	
2007	Atonement	Dario Marianelli	
2007	Eastern Promises	Howard Shore	
2007	Grace Is Gone	Clint Eastwood	
2007	Into the Wild	Michael Brook, Kaki King, Eddie Vedder	
2007	The Kite Runner	Alberto Iglesias	
2008	Slumdog Millionaire	A. R. Rahman	
2008	Changeling	Clint Eastwood	
2008	The Curious Case of Benjamin Button	Alexandre Desplat	
2008	Defiance	James Newton Howard	
2008	Frost/Nixon	Hans Zimmer	
2009	Up	Michael Giacchino	
2009	A Single Man	Abel Korzeniowski	
2009	Avatar	James Horner	
2009	The Informant!	Marvin Hamlisch	
2009	Where the Wild Things Are	Karen O, Carter Burwell	

=== 2010s ===
Year^{1}	Film	Composer(s)	Ref.
2010	The Social Network	Trent Reznor, Atticus Ross	
2010	127 Hours	A. R. Rahman	
2010	Alice in Wonderland	Danny Elfman	
2010	Inception	Hans Zimmer	
2010	The King's Speech	Alexandre Desplat	
2011	The Artist	Ludovic Bource	
2011	The Girl with the Dragon Tattoo	Trent Reznor, Atticus Ross	
2011	Hugo	Howard Shore	
2011	War Horse	John Williams	
2011	W.E.	Abel Korzeniowski	
2012	Life of Pi	Mychael Danna	
2012	Anna Karenina	Dario Marianelli	
2012	Argo	Alexandre Desplat	
2012	Lincoln	John Williams	
2012	Cloud Atlas	Tom Tykwer, Johnny Klimek, Reinhold Heil	
2013	All Is Lost	Alex Ebert	
2013	12 Years a Slave	Hans Zimmer	
2013	The Book Thief	John Williams	
2013	Gravity	Steven Price	
2013	Mandela: Long Walk to Freedom	Alex Heffes	
2014	The Theory of Everything	Jóhann Jóhannsson	
2014	Birdman	Antonio Sánchez	
2014	Gone Girl	Trent Reznor, Atticus Ross	
2014	The Imitation Game	Alexandre Desplat	
2014	Interstellar	Hans Zimmer	
2015	The Hateful Eight	Ennio Morricone	
2015	Carol	Carter Burwell	
2015	The Danish Girl	Alexandre Desplat	
2015	The Revenant	Ryuichi Sakamoto, Alva Noto	
2015	Steve Jobs	Daniel Pemberton	
2016	La La Land	Justin Hurwitz	
2016	Arrival	Jóhann Jóhannsson	
2016	Hidden Figures	Hans Zimmer, Pharrell Williams, Benjamin Wallfisch	
2016	Lion	Dustin O'Halloran, Hauschka	
2016	Moonlight	Nicholas Britell	
2017	The Shape of Water	Alexandre Desplat	
2017	Dunkirk	Hans Zimmer	
2017	Phantom Thread	Jonny Greenwood	
2017	The Post	John Williams	
2017	Three Billboards Outside Ebbing, Missouri	Carter Burwell	
2018	First Man	Justin Hurwitz	
2018	Black Panther	Ludwig Göransson	
2018	Isle of Dogs	Alexandre Desplat	
2018	Mary Poppins Returns	Marc Shaiman	
2018	A Quiet Place	Marco Beltrami	
2019	Joker	Hildur Guðnadóttir	
2019	1917	Thomas Newman	
2019	Little Women	Alexandre Desplat	
2019	Marriage Story	Randy Newman	
2019	Motherless Brooklyn	Daniel Pemberton	

=== 2020s ===
Year^{1}	Film	Composer(s)	Ref.
2020	Soul	Jon Batiste, Trent Reznor & Atticus Ross	
2020	Mank	Reznor & Ross	
2020	The Midnight Sky	Alexandre Desplat	
2020	News of the World	James Newton Howard	
2020	Tenet	Ludwig Göransson	
2021	Dune	Hans Zimmer	
2021	Encanto	Germaine Franco	
2021	The French Dispatch	Alexandre Desplat	
2021	Parallel Mothers	Alberto Iglesias	
2021	The Power of the Dog	Jonny Greenwood	
2022	Babylon	Justin Hurwitz	
2022	The Banshees of Inisherin	Carter Burwell	
2022	The Fabelmans	John Williams	
2022	Guillermo del Toro's Pinocchio	Alexandre Desplat	
2022	Women Talking	Hildur Guðnadóttir	
2023	Oppenheimer	Ludwig Göransson	
2023	The Boy and the Heron	Joe Hisaishi	
2023	Killers of the Flower Moon	Robbie Robertson (posthumous)	
2023	Poor Things	Jerskin Fendrix	
2023	Spider-Man: Across the Spider-Verse	Daniel Pemberton	
2023	The Zone of Interest	Mica Levi	
2024	Challengers	Trent Reznor and Atticus Ross	
2024	The Brutalist	Daniel Blumberg	
2024	Conclave	Volker Bertelmann	
2024	Dune: Part Two	Hans Zimmer	
2024	Emilia Pérez	Clément Ducol and Camille	
2024	The Wild Robot	Kris Bowers	
2025	Sinners	Ludwig Göransson	
2025	F1	Hans Zimmer	
2025	Frankenstein	Alexandre Desplat	
2025	Hamnet	Max Richter	
2025	One Battle After Another	Jonny Greenwood	
2025	Sirāt	Kangding Ray	

== Multiple wins ==
4 wins:

- Maurice Jarre
- Dimitri Tiomkin
- John Williams

3 wins:

- Justin Hurwitz
- Alan Menken
- Ennio Morricone
- Trent Reznor
- Atticus Ross
- Hans Zimmer

2 wins:

- Elmer Bernstein
- Alexandre Desplat
- Ludwig Göransson
- Frederick Loewe
- Giorgio Moroder
- Howard Shore

== See also ==
- Academy Award for Best Original Score
- BAFTA Award for Best Film Music
- Critics' Choice Movie Award for Best Score
- Grammy Award for Best Score Soundtrack for Visual Media
- Grammy Award for Best Compilation Soundtrack for Visual Media

== Notes ==
1. The year indicates the period for which the awards are given and not the year in which the ceremony took place.
