= Nova Zembla (record label) =

Belgian electronic music record label

Nova Zembla is a Belgian electronic music record label, daughter of Kk Records. It has worked with artists such as Black Lung, Xingu Hill, Shaolin Wooden Men, Little Nobody and Zen Paradox, as well as with the former Melbourne label IF? Records, now based in Tokyo.

== See also ==
- List of record labels
