= Hafted Maul =

Studio album by Dead Voices on Air
- Released: January 23, 1995
- Recorded: March 1993 – August 1994 in Vancouver, British Columbia, Canada
- Genre: Experimental
- Length: 57:13
- Label: Invisible Records
- Producer: Mark Spybey

Dead Voices on Air chronology
Abrader (1993)	Hafted Maul (1995)	New Words Machine (1995)

Hafted Maul is a 1995 album by Dead Voices on Air.

== Track listing ==
No.	Title	Length
1.	"Digging Stick"	2:38
2.	"Vers"	4:21
3.	"Tyme Tryeth Truth"	1:47
4.	"To Which Heart"	2:10
5.	"Urasia Circ (Excerpt)"	2:54
6.	"Madrid-Codex"	3:22
7.	"Eoraen"	3:14
8.	"Caoith"	13:50
9.	"Dockwood"	3:47
10.	"Saeculi"	10:29
11.	"Seminary"	2:35
12.	"Papa Papa Bata Kolm"	3:49
13.	"L'udito"	2:17
Total length:		57:13

== Credits ==
- Mark Spybey - performer, artwork, producer
- Zev Asher - performer (track 5)
- cEvin Key - performer (track 9)
- Mark Pilon - artwork
