= Three Colors: White (soundtrack) =

Film score by Zbigniew Preisner
- Released: 1994
- Genre: Soundtrack, classical
- Length: 35:46
- Label: Virgin

Three Colors chronology
| Three Colors: Blue (1993) | Three Colors: White (1994) | Three Colors: Red (1994) |

Professional ratings
Review scores
| Source | Rating |
|---|---|
| Allmusic | 3/5 stars |

White is the soundtrack to the film Three Colors: White by Polish composer Zbigniew Preisner and performed by Silesian Philharmonic choir along with Sinfonia.

== Track listing ==
1. The Beginning
2. The Court
3. Dominique Tries To Go Home
4. A Chat In The Underground
5. Return To Poland
6. Home At Last
7. On The Wisla
8. First Job
9. Don't Fall Asleep
10. After The First Transaction
11. Attempted Murder
12. The Party On The Wisla
13. Don Karol I
14. Phone Call To Dominique
15. Funeral Music
16. Don Karol II
17. Morning At The Hotel
18. Dominique's arrest
19. Don Karol III
20. Dominique In Prison
21. The End

== Three Colors soundtracks ==
- Three Colors: Blue (soundtrack)
- Three Colors: White (soundtrack)
- Three Colors: Red (soundtrack)
