= Three Colors: Red (soundtrack) =

Red (Soundtrack)

Film score by Zbigniew Preisner
- Released: 10 May 1994
- Genre: Soundtrack, classical
- Length: 41:57
- Label: Capitol

Three Colors chronology
Three Colors: White (1993)	Red (Soundtrack) (1994)

Professional ratings
Review scores
Source	Rating
Allmusic	4/5 stars

Three Colors: Red (Rouge: Bande Originale Du Film) is the soundtrack album to the award-winning film Three Colors: Red, with music composed by Zbigniew Preisner. The music is performed by the Sinfonia Varsovia (Beata Rybotycka, Elżbieta Towarnicka, Jacek Ostaszewski, Konrad Mastyło, Silesian Filharmonic Choir, Sinfonia Varsovia, Wojciech Michniewski - conductor).

== Track listing ==
1. Miłość od pierwszego wejrzenia – 4:28
2. Fashion Show I – 4:46
3. Meeting the Judge – 0:59
4. The Tapped Conversation – 1:17
5. Leaving the Judge – 1:48
6. Psychoanalysis – 2:05
7. Today Is My Birthday – 3:21
8. Do Not Take Another Man's Wife I – 2:09
9. Treason – 3:24
10. Fashion Show II – 1:24
11. Conversation at the Theatre – 3:45
12. The Rest of the Conversation at the Theatre – 1:28
13. Do Not Take Another Man's Wife II – 2:14
14. Catastrophe – 0:47
15. Finale – 2:58
16. L'Amour Au Premier Regard – 4:27

== Trivia ==
The music also depicts compositions by Van den Budenmayer, a fictional Dutch composer, created by Zbigniew Preisner who also features in other compositions made for Kieslowski's films, such as The Double Life of Veronique, Dekalog and Three Colors: Blue.

== Three Colors soundtracks ==
- Three Colors: Blue (soundtrack)
- Three Colors: White (soundtrack)
- Three Colors: Red (soundtrack)
