= Fire & Rain =

Studio album by Eden
- Released: April 3, 1995
- Recorded: May 1994–August 1994 at Toyland Studios, Melbourne, Australia
- Genre: Darkwave
- Length: 47:16
- Label: Projekt
- Producer: Sean Bowley, Adam Calaitzis

Eden chronology
Healingbow (1993)	Fire & Rain (1995)

Professional ratings
Review scores
Source	Rating
Allmusic	4/5 stars

Fire & Rain is the second album by Eden, released on April 3, 1995, through Projekt Records.

== Track listing ==
All lyrics are written by Sean Bowley, except where noted; all music is composed by Eden, except where noted

No.	Title	Writer(s)	Length
1.	"The Darkness in Me"		5:30
2.	"Snake"		3:53
3.	"Why?"		5:17
4.	"Hooveless Horses"		5:12
5.	"Fire & Rain"		4:03
6.	"Sky Above; Sea Below"		3:58
7.	"Song Slowly Song"	Philip King, Frank O'Connor	2:58
8.	"Stretched on Your Grave"	Larry Beckett, Tim Buckley	6:19
9.	"Rooms Above the Sea"		2:08
10.	"Breath Upon New Eyes"		3:39
11.	"Just Like Water; You Run From My Eyes!"		4:20

== Personnel ==
Eden

- Peter Barrett – drums, percussion
- Sean Bowley – vocals, guitar, tambura, handbell, production
- Paul Machliss – Mellotron, hammond organ
- Ewan McArthur – bass guitar

Production and additional personnel

- Don Bartley – mastering
- Garth Booth – photography
- Adam Calaitzis – sampler, production, engineering, mixing
- Tracy Ellerton – guitar
- Renato Gallina – design
- Hide Shibata – art direction, photography, design
