= Gateway to the Mysteries =

Studio album by Eden
- Released: 1990
- Recorded: May – September 1990
- Studio: Toyland Studios, Melbourne, Australia
- Genre: Darkwave
- Length: 51:17
- Label: Elysium; Third Mind (re-issue)
- Producer: Eden

Eden chronology
The Light Between Worlds (1990)	Gateway to the Mysteries (1990)	Healingbow (1993)

Gateway to the Mysteries is the debut studio album by Eden, released in 1990 by Elysium Records.

== Track listing ==
All tracks are written by Pieter Bourke and Sean Bowley

No.	Title	Length
1.	"Mystes"	1:34
2.	"Heads on the Hearth"	4:12
3.	"Saint Genevieve's Dance"	4:59
4.	"The Slow Bells"	3:52
5.	"The Unveiling of Brigid"	8:14
6.	"Spectral Pleasures"	4:54
7.	"Fears from the Fire"	5:28
8.	"Elder and Earthen Flame"	3:45
9.	"The Unveiling of Brigid"	1:43
10.	"Removed From Darkness"	7:20
11.	"Rain Washed"	5:12

CD bonus tracks
No.	Title	Length
12.	"Disenchanted Dream" (from the Searching For Angels Hands 7")	4:18
13.	"Shallow Mists" (from The Light Between Worlds EP)	4:07
14.	"Searching for Angels Hands" (from The Light Between Worlds EP)	4:55
15.	"Dark Beneath Trees" (from The Light Between Worlds EP)	2:53
16.	"Dusk" (from The Light Between Worlds EP)	3:29

== Personnel ==
Adapted from the Gateway to the Mysteries liner notes.

Eden

- Pieter Bourke – percussion, keyboards
- Sean Bowley – vocals, guitar, keyboards
- Ross Healy – bass guitar

Additional musicians

- Paula Coster – additional vocals, whistle and psaltery (5, 8)
- Andrew Skeoch – additional vocals (5)

Production and additional personnel

- Don Bartley – mastering, engineering
- Adam Calaitzis – engineering
- Miles Van Dorssen – photography
- Eden – production
- Carl Rolfe – photography
- Paul Rudwick – design
- Chris Thompson – engineering

== Release history ==
Region	Date	Label	Format	Catalog
Australia	1990	Elysium	CD, LP	ELY 1
United States	1991	Third Mind	CD, CS	TM 9219
