= Three Colors: Blue (soundtrack) =

Film score by Zbigniew Preisner
- Released: December 7, 1993
- Genre: Soundtrack, classical
- Length: 40:35
- Label: Virgin

Three Colors chronology
Three Colors: Blue	Three Colors: White

Professional ratings
Review scores
Source	Rating
Allmusic	4/5 stars

Three Colors: Blue (Bleu: Bande Originale Du Film) is the soundtrack album to the award-winning film Three Colors: Blue, with music composed by Zbigniew Preisner. The music is performed by the Sinfonia Varsovia (Beata Rybotycka, Elżbieta Towarnicka, Jacek Ostaszewski, Konrad Mastyło, Silesian Filharmonic Choir, Sinfonia Varsovia, Wojciech Michniewski - conductor).

== Track listing ==
1. Song for the Unification of Europe (Patrice's Version) – 5:13
2. Van Den Budenmayer-Funeral Music (Winds) – 2:02
3. Julie-Glimpses of Burial – 0:30
4. Reprise-First Appearance – 0:34
5. The Battle of Carnival and Lent – 0:56
6. Reprise-Julie with Olivier – 0:49
7. Ellipsis 1 – 0:20
8. First Flute – 0:50
9. Julie-In Her New Apartment – 1:45
10. Reprise-Julie on the Stairs – 1:05
11. Second Flute – 1:16
12. Ellipsis 2 – 0:20
13. Van Den Budenmayer-Funeral Music (Organ) – 1:59
14. Van Den Budenmayer-Funeral Music (Full Orchestra) – 1:47
15. The Battle of Carnival and Lent II – 0:42
16. Reprise-Flute (Closing Credits Version) – 2:19
17. Ellipsis 3 – 0:22
18. Olivier's Theme-Piano – 0:36
19. Olivier & Julie-Trial Composition – 2:01
20. Olivier's Theme-Finale – 1:38
21. Bolero-Trailer For 'Red' Film – 1:08
22. Song For The Unification Of Europe (Julie's Version) (Film) – 6:48
23. Closing Credits – 2:04
24. Reprise-Organ – 1:09
25. Bolero-'Red' Film – 1:28

== Other uses ==
"Reprise-Flute" appears during the haunting Triangle Shirtwaist fire scenes in Ric Burns' documentary film, New York.

A 2025 Nike commercial utilized “Song for the Unification of Europe (Julie’s Version).”

== Three Colors soundtracks ==
- Three Colors: Blue (soundtrack)
- Three Colors: White (soundtrack)
- Three Colors: Red (soundtrack)
