= The Light Between Worlds =

EP by Eden
- Released: 1990
- Recorded: September 1989
- Studio: Hothouse Audio, Australia
- Genre: Darkwave
- Length: 18:55
- Label: Nightshift

Eden chronology
The Light Between Worlds (1990)	Gateway to the Mysteries (1990)

The Light Between Worlds is an EP by Eden, released on 1990 by Nightshift Records UK.

== Track listing ==
All tracks are written by Eden

Side one
No.	Title	Length
1.	"Shallow Mists"	3:28
2.	"Elder and Earthen Flame"	3:43

Side two
No.	Title	Length
1.	"Searching for Angels Hands"	4:50
2.	"Dark Beneath Trees"	2:54
3.	"Dusk"	4:00

== Personnel ==
Adapted from The Light Between Worlds liner notes.

Eden

- Pieter Bourke – percussion, keyboards
- Sean Bowley – vocals, guitar, keyboards
- Ross Healy – bass guitar

Production and additional personnel

- Antenna – photography, design
- Eden – production (A1, A2, B3), remixing (B1, B2)
- Chris Harold – production (B1, B2)
- Kevin Metcalfe – mastering
- Simon Polinski – production (A1, A2, B3), remixing (B1, B2)

== Release history ==
Region	Date	Label	Format	Catalog
United Kingdom	1990	Nightshift	LP	NISHI 209
