= Disques Hushush =

Canadian independent record label

Disques Hushush Inc. (also known as Disques Hushush or more simply as Hushush) is an independent record label created by Dimitri della Faille (a.k.a. recording artist Szkieve) in Montreal (Quebec), Canada in 1998. Hushush mainly releases experimental, improvisation, electroacoustic, dark ambient and electronic music.

== Notable artists ==
Since 1998, Hushush has released over twenty CD and vinyls from more than thirty artists from Europe, North America, South America and Asia. Notable artists include Mick Harris, Mark Spybey, KK Null, Nihilist Spasm Band, Reynols, Vromb, Lilith (Scott Gibbons), C-drík, Aube, Goem, Kapotte Muziek, Moonsanto, Orphx, Szkieve, Ambre.

== Hed Nod ==
Hed Nod is a sidelabel from Hushush. The main focus of Hed Nod is to release downtempo hip hop or illbient music, mainly by Mick Harris.

== Discography ==
=== Hushush ===
- Various Artists - Four Ways Of Saying H_{3}O (CD - 1999)
- Szkieve - Des Germes De Quelque Chose (CD - 2000)
- Ambre & Mark Spybey - Sfumato (CD - 2001)
- Mark Spybey & Mick Harris - Bad Roads, Young Drivers (CD - 2001)
- Mick Harris & Ambre - Dys (CD - 2001)
- Moonsanto - Dogme (CDEP - 2001)
- C-drík - Dissolution (CD - 2001)
- K.K. Null - Peak Of Nothingness (CD - 2001)
- Moonsanto - Fraud - Hell - Dope (CD - 2001)
- Moonsanto - Fraud - Hell - Dope (Pesticides Forever Kit) (CD + Cass + Box - 2001)
- Martiens Go Home - Une Occasion De Chute (CD - 2002)
- Szkieve - Des Rythmes de Passage (CD - 2003)
- Christina Sealey / Richard Oddie / Mark Spybey - SOS (CD - 2003)
- Lilith - Imagined Compositions For Water (CD - 2002)
- Vromb - Mémoires Paramoléculaires (CD - 2002)
- Vromb & Szkieve - Le Pavillon Des Oiseaux / Le Monorail (7" - 2003)
- The Nihilist Spasm Band & Reynols - No Borders To No Borders (CD - 2007)
- Kapotte Muziek vs. Goem - KGM (CDEP - 2007)

=== Hed Nod ===
- Mick Harris - Hed Nod 01 (12" - 1999)
- Mick Harris - Hed Nod 02 (12" - 2000)
- Mick Harris - Hed Nod 03 (12" - 2000)
- Mick Harris - Hed Nod 04 (12" - 2000)
- Mick Harris - Having It (CD - 2000)
- Various Artists - Low End Recon (CD - 2001)

=== Others ===
- Various Artists - Modem Angels (CD - 1999)
- Various Artists - Re:cover (CD - 2002)

== See also ==
- List of record labels
