= How Hollow Heart... =

Studio album by Dead Voices on Air
- Released: January 21, 1997
- Recorded: March 28–29, 1996 in Toronto, Canada
- Genre: Experimental
- Length: 1:08:56
- Label: Invisible Records
- Producer: Mark Spybey

Dead Voices on Air chronology
Shap (1996)	How Hollow Heart... (1997)	A Fire in the Bronx Zoo (1997)

Professional ratings
Review scores
Source	Rating
Allmusic	2.5/5 stars

How Hollow Heart... is a 1997 album by Dead Voices on Air.

The title of the album is taken from a poem by Samuel Beckett: "How hollow heart and full of filth thou art".

== Track listing ==
No.	Title	Length
1.	"Mourning Songs"	6:03
2.	"Jievoao"	2:35
3.	"Ralbag"	4:13
4.	"My Wreath Is Of Red Jewels"	20:40
5.	"Vuls - Credne"	35:25
Total length:		1:08:56

== Credits ==
- Mark Spybey - performer, artwork, producer
- Gerald Belanger - performer, engineer
- Sheldon Drake - performer
- Christopher Drost - performer
- Heiki Sillaste - performer
- Desmond K. Hill - lyrics and voice (on track 1)
- Chris Greene - mastering
