= Vromb =

Canadian electronic music act

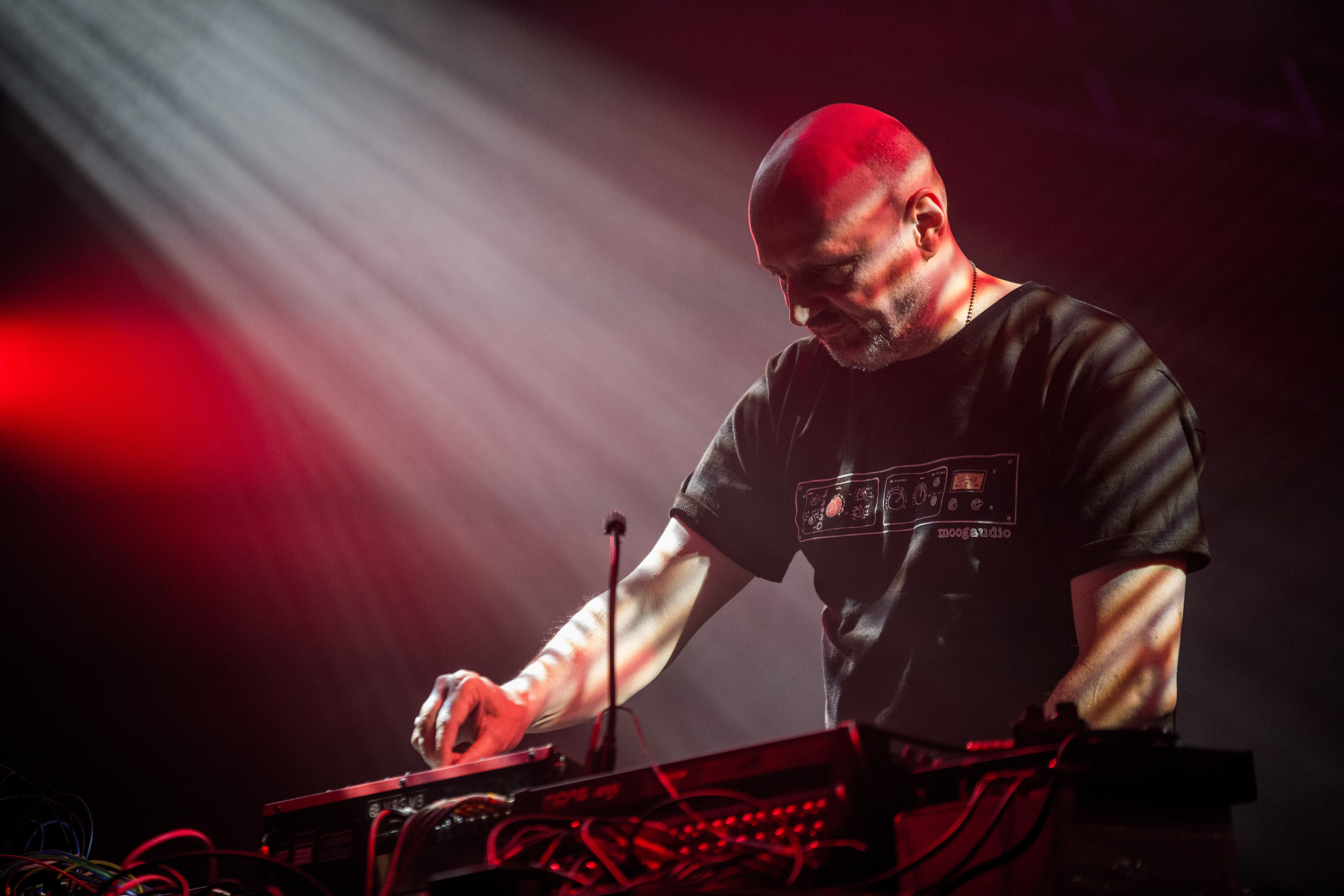
- Maschinenfest 2015

Background information
- Origin: Montreal, Quebec, Canada
- Genres: Dark ambient Minimal techno
- Years active: 1992–present
- Labels: Tesco Organisation; Ant-Zen; Hushush; Klanggalerie; Angle Rec
- Members: Hugo Girard
- Website: hushush.com/vromb

Vromb (recording alias for Hugo Girard, real name Mario Girard) is a Canadian electronic music act from Montreal, Quebec. Vromb has been internationally active since 1992.

In the independent underground electronic music scene Vromb has a solid reputation. Vromb creates a unique sound consisting of industrial music, minimal techno rhythms, dense music layers and sci-fi sounds. It sometimes also includes the voices of his fictional character, Professeur Heurel Gaudot.

The uniqueness of Vromb can be fully experienced during his rare live appearances. In fact, while electronic musicians will usually perform with a laptop, Vromb is performing with analog synthesizers.

Most releases by Vromb are made available in refined packagings. Most notable is Épisodes released in 2001 by Ant-Zen in Germany. This release is available under three formats. Of which, the most elaborate is a thick metal box, including a 5" vinyl, a luxurious booklet, as well as a CD.

Since 1993, Vromb has released about two dozen records and CDs on reputed labels from Germany, Austria, Canada, The United States and France such as Ant-Zen, Hymen Records Tesco Organisation, Klanggalerie, Angle Rec and Hushush. One of his more critically successful albums was Memoires Paramoleculaires. His album, Rayons in 2003 was also well received by a number of music critics.
