= Mark Nugent =

Mark Nugent was a prolific British and Canadian filmmaker, digital artist and writer.

== Early life ==
He was born in Newcastle upon Tyne, UK, Nugent emigrated to Canada with his family when he was seven.

== Education ==
Nugent received a BFA in Film Production from Concordia University. He went on to attend the School of the Art Institute of Chicago on scholarship and obtained a Master's in Fine Arts for Film Production.

== Career ==
Nugent collaborated with a number of musicians (including Download, Dead Voices on Air, Coil, FAT, Nimrod, Hafler Trio, Bruce Gilbert, Vent du Mont Scharr and Elliott Sharp) to create experimental films and live presentations. He founded and toured with Roughage, a Montreal-based mixed-media performance group, and briefly worked for Chicago's H-Gun, producing commercial music videos. Until recently, his art was part of a genre that rarely attracted critical attention from anyone other than his peers.

=== 1980s ===
In the late 1980s, Nugent travelled with the band FAT to Morocco and collected Super-8 footage that he would later use in his 1989 video "Inverse Proportions" on YouTube for the Elliott Sharp-led ensemble Carbon, and in his 1992 "Dark River" video on YouTube for the band Coil.

=== 1990s ===
Nugent produced a large number of hallucinatory films in the early nineties, combining his acute ability to optically process seemingly abstract images and colours, with super 8 footage and film. In the tradition of William S. Burroughs, Chris Marker, Werner Herzog, Stan Brakhage, and David Bohm, Nugent used a variety of media to explore his fascinations: the realms of consciousness, perception, alchemy, mysticism and quantum physics.

Nugent created films for a number of post-industrial bands and projected his work live, to great effect on the Download tour of Europe in 1996. In 1997, Nugent founded the website Psilence Image Environments to showcase his digital image work.

=== 2000s ===
For ten years Nugent worked on numerous digital images and cut-up writings, collaborating on a number of projects including the film Alchemical Conversations (2003), and developing websites and commercial CD releases. Most recently, he collaborated on a series of images with Aaron Campbell.

== Death ==
Nugent died on 16 December 2009 of a heart attack aged 48. His funeral was held on 9 January 2010 in Montreal. Nugent's preserved video work is to be included in a collection housed in museums around the world.

== Film and video ==
- 1985 Grain Films (16mm)
- 1985 Cameraman On-Are you There? Are you Listening – Velcrow Ripper (16mm)
- 1986 On Air (16mm)
- 1987 Manual Labour LSD-and the politics of pharmaceuticals. The image machine and the spectacle. Semantics and disappearance. The creation and the process. Rest after the storm.
- 1987 Carrousel (to Hell) Optically printed Funny satirical film.
- 1989 Carbon-Inverse Proportions Music film by Mark Nugent and Leah Singer. Music by Elliott Sharp. All optically printed, no computers were used in this film. A prescient view of the clash of civilisations.
- 1992 Dark River (Coil) Music film shot in Morocco and Wyoming. Music by Coil. Based on the Bardo Thodol, The Tibetan Book of the Dead. Made using film based optical printing. No computers were used in this film. Dedicated to the memory of Jhon Balance of Coil.
- 1992 Mr. Sullivan What happened? We heard him scream and came and found him like this. A tongue in cheek, black humour collage film made as a music video for the band Nimrod. Later adapted for Vent du Mont Scharr.
- 1993 Rain Will Fall by I Mother Earth from H-Gun with Eric Koziel. Mark did optical printing and image manipulation of 16mm film Eric shot in Mexico with the band and some other actors.
- 1994 I Married a Munchkin Opticals and color consultant.
- Sex on Wheelz video, My Life with the Thrill Kill Kult.
- 1995 Mark Nugent's Optical Seizures, Edison Electric, Vancouver, BC, Canada.
- 1996 Base Metal (Download) Amiga performance video for Download 1996 world tour.
- 1996 Eyes of Stanley Pain (Download) Amiga tour video from 1996 world tour.
- 1996 Glassblower (Download) Live performance video for Download's 1996 world tour. From the album "The Eyes of Stanley Pain." Made on an Amiga Live board.
- 1996 The Turin Cloud (Download) Live performance video for 1996 Download world tour. From the album "The Eyes of Stanley Pain." Made with a real time Amiga Live board.
- 1996 Sunni C (Download) A hallucinatory vision of psychosis and the space that lies between. Produced on an Amiga Live board.
- 2003 Alchemical Conversations (Alchemy and archetypes) with Dead Voices on Air.
