= Elżbieta Towarnicka =

Polish soprano

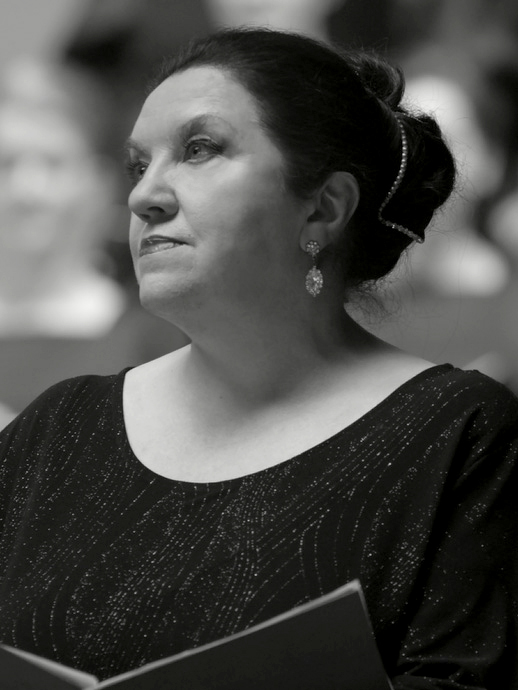
Elżbieta Towarnicka

Elżbieta Towarnicka (born 1950) is a Polish operatic soprano who made an international career based at the Opera Krakowska. She is also known for singing for films, especially with music by Zbigniew Preisner including the theme song of Avalon.

== Life and career ==
Born in Wrocław, Towarnicka studied at the Krakow Conservatoire with Barbary Walczyńskiej. She received a special award at the first Adam Didur Vocal Competition in 1979. She was a member of the Opera Krakowska from 1979 to 1981, where she performed in operas such as Puccini's La Bohème and Tosca, Verdi's Rigoletto, and La Traviata, Bizet's Les Pêcheurs de perles, Gluck's Orfeo ed Euridice and Purcell's Dido and Aeneas. She has participated in numerous classical music festivals in Poland including Warsaw Autumn and has performed in most European countries as well as in the U.S., Japan, Argentina, and Canada.

She is known for having worked with Zbigniew Preisner, notably on the soundtracks of the Three Colours trilogy, such as Three Colors: Red. She sings the theme song for the film Avalon and appears at the end of the film. She also sings on the soundtrack of the film The Double Life of Veronique. In 1996 she sang a piece composed by Preisner for the funeral mass of filmmaker Krzysztof Kieślowski, Requiem For My Friend. Towarnicka's repertoire includes works by Jan Kanty Pawluśkiewicz.
