= Eden (Australian band) =

Australian dark wave band

- Origin: Melbourne, Victoria, Australia
- Genres: Neoclassical dark wave, gothic rock, dream pop, neo-psychedelia
- Years active: 1987–present
- Labels: Elysium, Third Mind, Projekt
- Members: Sean Bowley; Anthony Cornish; Ingo Wieben
- Past members: Peter Barrett; Pieter Bourke; Ross Healy; Paul Machlis; Ewan McArthur
- Website: Official Website

Eden are an Australian dark wave band that was formed in Melbourne in 1987 by Sean Bowley, Pieter Bourke and Ross Healy.

== History ==
Eden's first gig was at the Baden Powell Hotel, Prahran, they soon performed at other pubs in Melbourne's alternative music scene. In 1990 they issued their debut five-track extended play, The Light Between Worlds, on the Scottish label Nightshift Records. The lead track, "Shallow Mists", was co-written by Bourke, Bowley and Healy. They released a single, "Searching for Angels Hands", which broadened their audience by a performance on national pop music TV series, Countdown Revolution. The single was also co-written by Bourke, Bowley and Healy.

In 1992 Eden released a full-length studio album, Gateway to the Mysteries, on the English label Third Mind Records and in Australia on Elysium Records via Shock Records. Bourke's last recorded output with Eden was a six-track EP, Healingbow, released in 1993 on Projekt Records.

Drummer Peter Barrett, keyboardist Paul Machlis and bassist Ewan McArthur joined Eden for their second studio album Fire & Rain, released in 1995. Allmusic's Ned Raggett found the new line-up's music to be "a less eclectic but no less intriguing sonic palette, extending the goth/psych tendencies of Bowley's particular muse to their logical conclusions."

== Eden Today ==
Eden re-formed in 2015 in Melbourne, Australia and once again established themselves as regular performers in the alternative scene. The distinctive Eden sound, this iteration delivered by a lineup comprising Sean Bowley (6 & 12 string guitars, Matthew Sigley (bass, drum machine and keyboards), Andrew Kutzer (6 string guitar) culminated in the release of 'The Edge of Winter' LP in June 2017 at Wave-Gotik-Treffen (WGT) in Leipzig, Germany where Eden performed with a showcase of bands including The Mission, Skinny Puppy and She Past Away http://www.wave-gotik-treffen.de/english/bands.php.

Since 2018, core members of Eden have comprised Sean Bowley (vocals, 6 & 12 string guitars) and Anthony Cornish (6 & 12 string guitarist, keyboards, drum machine). The EDEN-REVENANT synergy forms the core of a continually evolving Eden.

In May 2020 Eden release their new LP 'East of the Stars'. Eden will launch the album with a performance at Wave-Gotik-Treffen 2020 in Leipzig, Germany. Joining the EDEN lineup is Steven Burrows (former member of And Also the Trees) on bass. The band will also perform Netherlands, Belgium and Greece as part of their 'East of the Stars' tour.

== Discography ==
Studio albums

- Gateway to the Mysteries (1990, Elysium)
- Earthbound (1995, Elysium)
- Fire & Rain (1995, Projekt)
- The Edge of Winter (2017, Seraphyne)

EPs

- The Light Between Worlds (1990, Nightshift Records UK)
- Healingbow (1993, Projekt)
- Stone Cat (1997, Heartland Records AUS)

Singles

- Searching for Angels Hands (1990, Ultimate Records)
