= John Sellekaers =

- Also known as: Concrete Garden; Feral Cities; Jonah Hex; Meeple; Nicolas Hall; Night Sky Pulse; Tuttle & Buttle; Xingu Hill
- Born: John-Nicolas Sellekaers; December 19, 1973 (age 52)
- Origin: Montreal, Quebec, Canada
- Genres: Electronic; Ambient; Electronica; Experimental; Industrial; Techno
- Occupations: Composer, Audio Mastering Engineer, Photographer
- Instruments: Keyboards, Music sequencer, Sampling
- Years active: 1994–present
- Labels: Ad Noiseam; Angle Rec; Ant-Zen; Delikatessen; Foton; Disques Hushush; Hymen; Klanggalerie; Low Impedance Recordings; Mirex; Nova Zembla; Re-Load Ambient; Oreille Gardee; Glacial Movements
- Formerly of: A Million Burning Suns; Ambre; Ammo; Black Lung; Collapse; Dead Hollywood Stars; Internal; Logatomistes; Moonsanto; Myrza; The Missing Ensemble; Torsion; Uncotones; Urawa; xhm²
- Website: www.johnsellekaers.com

John Nicolas Sellekaers is a Canadian-born musician and audio mastering engineer. Born in 1973 in Montreal, Quebec he later moved to Brussels, Belgium. Beginning with his project Xingu Hill in the 1990s, he has released over 60 records under various aliases such as Night Sky Pulse, Feral Cities, Meeple, and Dead Hollywood Stars on labels such as Ant-Zen, Hymen Records, Nova Zembla and Disques Hushush. His style ranges from experimental music to electronica.

== Biography ==
Around 1988, under the influence of electronic music pioneers such as Cabaret Voltaire and Tangerine Dream, he began experimenting with synthesizers. Later, in the early nineties, he started a magazine devoted to underground culture entitled "Noyade mécanique" (for Mechanical drowning). Other contributors for this magazine included Belgian artists such as Olivier Moreau and Seal Phüric.

Besides his main incarnation, Xingu Hill, Sellekaers has recorded under several aliases and in numerous collaborations. These include Dead Hollywood Stars, Urawa, The Missing Ensemble, Uncotones, Ambre, Moonsanto, Ammo, and Torsion.

He has collaborated with artists such as Mick Harris (of Scorn), David Thrussell (of Snog and Black Lung), Olivier Moreau (of Imminent), Séba Dolimont (of Aïboforcen), C-drik Fermont, Silk Saw, and Mathis Mootz (of Panacea).

During his career, John Sellekaers has extensively played live in Europe and North America.

Since 1998 he has owned and operated the Metarc mastering studio, currently located in Montreal.

Despite having released music under a number of monikers over the years, he didn't release music under his own name until 2019 with the release of Residual Broadcast, which was followed by releases in 2021 of Observer Effect on Glacial Movements and Foilum on the Oreille Gardee label. His more recent works trend towards ambient and atmospheric soundscapes, infused with elements of field recording.

=== Xingu Hill ===
His first project, Xingu Hill, began circa 1994 when the Belgian underground techno, ambient and IDM record label Nova Zembla signed Sellekaers for three albums. 1995 saw the release of his first album as Xingu Hill, Maps Of The Impossible. The remainder of the three-album deal included (Fiction) (1996) and Relay (1997).

In 1999, Xingu Hill released Alterity on the Ant-Zen label imprint, Hymen Records. The same year, Ant-Zen released The Andronechron Incident, a collaboration between Xingu Hill and Black Lung, as a limited 10" vinyl with a subsequent CD release in 2002.

In 2005, Xingu Hill and Austin, TX, band Tamarin collaborated with former BYU professor Brian Evenson on the soundtrack and spoken word interpretation of Evenson's fiction work Altmann's Tongue, also released on Ant-Zen.

In 2021, Xingu Hill released a retrospective compilation entitled Strange Echoes 95 — 99. In 2023, Xingu Hill released Grigri Pavilion, the first new material in 20 years.

=== Moonsanto ===
Moonsanto is an experimental music and political project by Sellekaers, C-drik Fermont, Gabriel Séverin and Marc Mœdea. Active since 2000, Moonsanto can be called an industrial supergroup as it consist of members of Xingu Hill, Dead Hollywood Stars, Silk Saw and Ammo. Moonsanto's first full-length release is called Fraud Hell Dope. It is in fact a play on words about Monsanto Company's motto, "Food Health Hope". It is a multinational company active in the genetic engineering market.

== Discography ==
=== As John Sellekaers ===
- Residual Broadcast (2019) Cass; Oreille Gardée
- Machines Inutiles (2019) Cass, Falt
- Isolation Postcard (2020) Digital; Self-released
- Observer Effect (2021) CD, Digital; Glacial Movements Records
- Folium (2021) Cass, Digital; Oreille Gardée
- Approaches (2021) Cass, Digital; Falt
- What Happens at Night (2022) Digital; Self-released
- Phaenomena (2024) Digital; Self-released
- Territoires Anonymes (2024) Digital; Falt

=== With Patrick Graham ===
- Lacuna (2019) Digital; Parenthèses Records
- Innerland (2019) Digital; Parenthèses Records
- Unnatural (2020) CD, Digital; Parenthèses Records
- Next of Kin (2020) Digital; Parenthèses Records

=== As Concrete Garden ===
- Furtive (2020) Digital; Self-released
- In A Sealed Box (2020) Digital; Self-released
- "Vénéneux" (2020) Digital; Self-released
- Magnetic Dawn (2020) Digital; Self-released
- 2:55 AM (2020) Digital; Drunken Forest
- On Vanishing (2022) Digital; Drunken Forest

=== As Feral Cities ===
- "Remote" (2019) Digital; Self-released
- Near Strangers (2019) Digital; Self-released
- Unconscious Places (2020) Digital; Self-released
- Slow Light (2020) Digital; Self-released
- Arcs & Layers (2021) Digital; Fallen Moon Recordings
- Double Shadow (2022) Digital; Heol Ddu

=== As Meeple ===
- Temporary Fantasy, Pt. 1 (2019) Digital; Self-released
- Temporary Fantasy, Pt. 2 (2019) Digital; Self-released
- Modern Cosmonautics (2020) Digital; Self-released
- Micronations (2021) Digital; Drunken Forest
- Diagrams (2022) Digital; Drunken Forest
- Citadel (2022) Digital; Self-released
- Polychromatic (2024) Digital; Self-released
- In Unfamiliar Ways (2024) Digital; Self-released
- Across the Continent (2024) Digital; Self-released

=== As Nicolas Hall ===
- At Nightfall (2022) Digital; Self-released
- Sea Cave (2022) Digital; Self-released
- Ebb (2022) Digital; Self-released
- Instant Future, Pt 1. (2023) Digital; Self-released
- Instant Future, Pt 2. (2023) Digital; Self-released
- "Magnetic Midnight" (2023) Digital; Self-released

=== As Night Sky Pulse ===
- Arcana (2019) Digital; Self-released
- The Hive (2019) Digital; Self-released
- Habitat (2019) Digital; Self-released
- No One We Know (2019) Digital; Self-released
- Sole Witness (2020) Digital; Drunken Forest
- Metamorphic (2020) Digital; Drunken Forest
- These Possible Lives (2021) Digital; See Blue Audio
- Superlunar Lounge (2022) Digital; See Blue Audio
- Chromosphere (2024) Digital; Adventurous Music

=== As Tuttle & Buttle ===
- Fourth Wall (2022) Digital; Self-released
- Offworld (2022) Digital; Self-released
- Velvet Night Valley (2022) Digital; Self-released
- Sun Echoes (2022) Digital; Self-released
- Telltale (2022) Digital; Self-released
- Airglow (2022) Digital; Self-released

=== As Xingu Hill ===
- Maps of the Imposible (1995) CD, LP; Nova Zembla
- (Fiction) (1996) CD, LP; Nova Zembla
- Relay (1997) CD; Nova Zembla
- Alterity (1999) CD, Hymen Records
- The Andronechron Incident (with Black Lung) (1999) 10" (2002) CD; Ant-Zen
- 16 Bit Golem (2003) 7"; Mirex
- Altmann's Tongue (with Tamarin and Brian Evenson) (2005) CD; Ant-Zen
- Archives (1995-1997) (2020) Compilation, Digital; Self-released
- Strange Echoes 95 — 99 (2021) Compilation, Digital, LP; Traumgarten
- Grigri Pavilion (2023) LP, Digital; Subexotic Records
