= Pieter Bourke =

Australian musician

- Born: Melbourne, Victoria, Australia
- Genres: Neoclassical dark wave, ambient, world, soundtrack, dub, electro-industrial
- Occupations: Musician, composer, producer, audio engineer
- Instruments: Keyboards, synthesizers, samplers, drums and percussion
- Years active: 1987–present
- Labels: 4AD, Third Mind, Extreme, Elysium, Shock, Sony, Nightshift, Karmic Hit, Projekt, Master Tunes
- Website: www.pieterbourke.com

Pieter Bourke is an Australian musician, composer, producer and audio engineer. From 1995 he has recorded several projects with Dead Can Dance founder Lisa Gerrard, and was a touring member of Dead Can Dance's 1996 Spiritchaser Tour. On 14 April 1998 Bourke and Gerrard issued a world music album, Duality. From 1993 he also collaborated with industrial musician, David Thrussell (alias Black Lung), first as part of the latter's band Snog, then together as the ambient duo, Soma. In 2001, he formed a dub reggae outfit, Secret Masters, with Brian Westbrook (a.k.a. Donnie Dub). Bourke and Gerrard have received two shared Golden Globe nominations for 'Best Original Score', in 2000 for The Insider (1999), and in 2002 for Ali (2001).

== Career ==
=== Early years and Eden ===
Pieter Bourke grew up in Melbourne, Australia. At the age of 12 years he learned to play an electronic drum and was largely self-taught as a percussionist and keyboardist. From 1987 to 1988 he completed a course in Graphic Design at Chisholm Institute of Technology. In 1987 Bourke formed the Melbourne-based electronic pop rock band Eden, providing keyboards, rhythm programming and percussion. Fellow founders were Sean Bowley (ex-All Things Unseen) on vocals and guitar, and Ross Healy on bass guitar. Eden's first gig was at the Baden Powell Hotel, Prahran, they soon performed at other pubs in Melbourne's alternative music scene. In 1989 they issued their debut five-track extended play, The Light Between Worlds, on the Scottish label Nightshift Records. The lead track, "Shallow Mists", was co-written by Bourke with Bowley and Healy. They released a single, "Searching for Angels Hands", which broadened their audience by a performance on national pop music TV series, Countdown Revolution. The single was also co-written by Bourke, Bowley and Healy.

In 1990 Eden released a full-length studio album, Gateway to the Mysteries, on the English label Third Mind Records and in Australia on Elysium Records via Shock Records. Its sixth track, "Spectral Pleasures", was co-written by Bourke and Bowley, and was dedicated to the memory of Valerie Mary Bourke. Bourke's last recorded output with Eden was a six-track EP, Healingbow, released in 1993 on Projekt Records. The lead track was co-written by Bourke and Bowley. Allmusic's Ned Raggett found "Bourke's percussive work isn't as unique as that of his obvious inspirations in Dead Can Dance, but it's still very fine stuff, suiting and setting the songs' feelings and pace very well". Bourke is credited with hammer dulcimer, keyboards, percussion and programming while additional drums and remix work was provided by guest musician, David Thrussell (see Black Lung). From early 1993 Bowley suffered from glandular fever and late that year Bourke left the group.

=== Collaborations with David Thrussell ===
In 1993 Pieter Bourke began a collaborative partnership with Thrussell. They shared an interest in European electronic music and the emerging audio sampling technology. Bourke joined Thrussell's techno-industrial band Snog, playing keyboards live and writing new material with Thrussell. Snog had formed in 1989 by Thrussell with fellow art school mates, Tim McGrath and Julia Bourke. Snog's first single with Pieter Bourke aboard, "Born to Be Mild", is credited to Julia Mary Bourke, Thrussell and McGrath. It was followed by their Christmas single, "Hey Christian God", which was co-written by Pieter Bourke and Thrussell. In 1994 a full-length album, Dear Valued Customer, was released and was supported by live performances across Australia. Bourke co-wrote three tracks for the 1996 Snog album, Buy Me...I’ll Change Your Life, including the singles "The Future" and "Hooray". His last contribution to Snog was "The Grey Menace", which was co-written with Thrusell, and appeared on the 1999 release Third Mall from the Sun.

Parallel to Snog, also in 1993, Bourke and Thrussell created an ambient duo, Soma. A self-titled seven-track CD was recorded and released in 1993. It was expanded with the addition of six songs and released as Hollow Earth on 15 December 1994. Allmusic's Theo Kavadias described the release, "Bourke's organic influence wrapped around Thrussell's electro sensibilities created exotic constructions that skirted the borders of ambience, techno and soundtrack with a vocabulary both stylish and deep".

In 1996 Soma released The Inner Cinema, which "sees the collaboration between Thrussell and Bourke evolve and deepen from the tone set by their debut" according to Kavadias. Stygian Vistas, an eight-track EP was released on 1 July 1997, it contains a remixes of tracks from the first two albums plus three new songs. Bourke and Thrussell took a hiatus from Soma to work on other projects, they re-emerged in 2000 with a four-track CD EP, My Ancient Vihmaana.

=== Collaborations with Lisa Gerrard ===
In 1995 Pieter Bourke began working with Lisa Gerrard, co-founder of the world music group, Dead Can Dance. Bourke provided bass guitar, darabeka, drums, hand clapping, tabla and backing vocals on Gerrard's first solo album, The Mirror Pool (August 1995). He became a touring member of her band for concerts in Europe and North America. In late 1996 Bourke played keyboards and percussion for Dead Can Dance on their Spiritchaser Tour, to promote the band's album of the same name (June 1996). His favourite instruments, at the time, were the Near Eastern tar and Egyptian darabukka.

In 1997 Gerrard invited Bourke to perform on her second solo album, Duality. As well as playing percussion and keyboards, Bourke was asked to engineer and co-produce the recordings. As work progressed, Bourke's role expanded from session musician and recording assistant to full partner. The album was co-credited to Gerrard and Bourke and released on 14 April 1998 on the 4AD Records label. All the tracks were co-written by Bourke and Gerrard, except "Tempest" which is co-credited to Bourke, Gerrard and Iranian musician, Madjid Khaladj. Raggett observed that "Bourke's own contributions ... mesh excellently with her instrumental work and, since no specific credit appears instrument for instrument, everything works as a true partnership". According to Michael Lund of Last Sigh Magazine, "Gerrard has commented that the recording process of Duality was one of rare synchronicity, and that her and Bourke experienced moments of spiritual elevation while creating the music". "The Human Game" was released as a single from the album, accompanied by a music video. The album also contains "Sacrifice" which is used in film and television shows.

In 1998 Bourke and Gerrard were asked by Italian director Ivana Massetti to contribute music to Nadro, a French documentary on West African visual artist, poet and author, Frederic Bruly Bouabre. Two tracks from the score were included on "The Human Game" CD single: "Awakening" and "Jungabya". In 1999 Bourke and Gerrard composed the soundtrack for the film, The Insider by American director, Michael Mann. Allmusic's Stephen Thomas Erlewine stated their score was "eerie and haunting, somewhere between ambient and new age, but always evocative and cinematic. This may be a strange choice for a seemingly dry journalism tale, but it works terrifically and gives a good sense of how unusual and unpredictable The Insider is". In January 2000 the film received three Golden Globe Award nominations, including 'Best Original Score' for Bourke and Gerrard. In 2001 Bourke and Gerrard scored Mann's next film, a bio-pic about World Boxing Champion, Muhammad Ali. In January 2002 the film, Ali, also received a Golden Globe Award nomination for 'Best Original Score'.

=== Secret Masters ===
In 2001 Pieter Bourke established a dub reggae duo, Secret Masters, in collaboration with club DJ, Brian Westbrook (a.k.a. Donnie Dub). Back in 1993 Bourke had met Westbrook, who provided cello on Eden's Healingbow. In 2004 Secret Masters' debut album, The Lost Dub Tapes, was released on their self-funded label, Master Tunes. For the 2009 follow up album, Words, Power, Sound, Westbrook travelled to Jamaica to record with local vocalists. The album includes two tracks featuring British reggae singer and DJ Tippa Irie.

== Discography ==
=== Albums ===
- 1991 – Gateway to the Mysteries – CD – Eden (Shock/Third Mind Records)
- 1994 – Hollow Earth – CD – Soma (Extreme)
- 1995 – Dear Valued Customer – CD – Snog (Polygram/Machinery)
- 1996 – The Inner Cinema – CD – Soma (Extreme)
- 1998 – Duality – CD – with Lisa Gerrard (4AD Records)
- 1999 – The Insider – soundtrack CD – with Lisa Gerrard (Sony Music)
- 2002 – Ali – soundtrack CD – with Lisa Gerrard (Universal Music Group)
- 2004 – The Lost Dub Tapes – CD – Secret Masters (Master Tunes)
- 2009 – Words, Power, Sound – 2CD – Secret Masters (Master Tunes)

=== EPS ===
- 1989 – The Light Between Worlds – EP – Eden (Nightshift)
- 1993 – Healingbow – EP – Eden (Projekt)
- 1993 – Soma – EP – Soma (Extreme)
- 1997 – Stygian Vistas – EP – Soma (Extreme)
- 1998 – The Human Game – EP – with Lisa Gerrard (4AD Records)
- 2000 – My Ancient Vihmaana – EP – Soma (Karmic Hit)

== Awards and nominations ==
=== ARIA Music Awards ===
The ARIA Music Awards is an annual awards ceremony held by the Australian Recording Industry Association. They commenced in 1987.

Year	Nominee / work	Award	Result	Ref.
1998	Duality (with Lisa Gerrard)	Best World Music Album	Nominated	
