= Snog (band) =

Australian band

- Origin: Melbourne, Victoria, Australia
- Genres: Experimental, EBM, IDM, industrial, electro-industrial, anti-folk
- Years active: 1988–present
- Labels: Machinery Records; Metropolis Records; Zoth Ommog Records; Shock Records; Hymen Records; Karmic Hit; Psy-Harmonics
- Members: David Thrussell
- Past members: Pieter Bourke; Tim McGrath; Julia Bourke

Snog is a band that was formed by Australian musician David Thrussell, along with fellow art school friends Tim McGrath and Julia Bourke in 1989. The band's music is a fusion of many different styles, including industrial, techno, ambient, experimental, funk and country music. The band name is a reference to "kissing and cuddling".

== History ==
Snog's first album Lies Inc. was released in 1992 and Pieter Bourke, who has since worked with Dead Can Dance and Lisa Gerrard, joined the band soon afterwards. The second album, Dear Valued Customer, which drew heavily on techno influences, was then released in 1994. Also in 1994, the side projects Soma (Thrussell and Pieter Bourke) and Black Lung.

By 1997, the band was primarily a solo project for Thrussell, who collaborated with guest musicians on recordings. The next album release was Buy Me... I'll Change Your Life and country western-style guitar was featured, as well as a cover version of Lee Hazlewood's "Let the Little Flowers Grow". Third Mall from the Sun followed in 1999 and the album blended the styles of the previous two albums, in addition to new influences. Thrussell described the progression of Snog's musical styles in a 1998 interview with Sonic Boom Magazine: "In the past Snog has written a lot of dance floor material and while it has been successful, I kind of felt that I needed to write something different. I intentionally try and do something new with every Snog release. I do not want to get caught up in the musical trap of remaking the same album over and over".

Third Mall from the Sun was followed by the remix album Relax into the Abyss. In 2003, the album Beyond the Valley of the Proles was released, which included the first of many collaborations with John Kilbey of The Bhagavad Guitars.

Snog continued to release music into the 21st century and the EP Everything Is Under Control (consists of remixes and the additional song "The Lament of the Lost Sheep") was released on iTunes on 25 March 2013. The EP was followed by 23 April 2013 album release Babes in Consumerland and both recordings are part of a contract with the Metropolis record label.

A music video for Everything Is Under Control was published on the Internet on 19 March 2013. On 20 March 2013 Snog also released a 12" vinyl record with French record label M-Tronic entitled "The Plug-In Drug"; produced as blue-coloured vinyl and limited to 300 copies, the record features three songs from Babes In Consumerland, in addition to remixes and unreleased songs.

== Politics ==
Thrussell's songs frequently contain themes of anti-consumerism, anti-capitalism, individuality and opposition to the idea of Big Brother.

The albums Third Mall from the Sun (1999), Relax into the Abyss (2000) and Beyond the Valley of the Proles (2003), The Last Days of Rome (2006) and City (2008) featured artwork by Canadian artist Chris Woods, whose paintings lampoon the advertising tactics of major corporations such as McDonald's, The Gap and Nike.

Snog supports the copying of its music and depending on the recording label, many releases are designated copyleft (or "copyright-free"), as indicated by a crossed-out "©" symbol that is printed on the album case.

== Reception ==
In a 2008 review of The Last Days of Rome, Matthew Rich from Left Hip Magazine described Snog as "the greatest band at the moment".

== Snog discography ==
=== Albums ===
- Lies Inc. – (CD LP) 1992 – Machinery • (CD Album) 1993 – Id • (CD Album, Reissue) 1993 – Futurist, Machinery • (CD Album) 2003 – Ground Under Production
- Dear Valued Customer – (CD LP) 1994 – Id • 1995 – Machinery
- Buy Me... I'll Change Your Life – (CD LP) 1997 – Shock • (CD Album) 1998 – Metropolis (#14 CMJ RPM Charts)
- Third Mall from the Sun – (CD LP) 1999 – Metropolis, Hymen Records, Rollercoaster Recordings • (2xLP Album) 1999 – Hymen Records • (2xCD Album) 2001 – Equinox (#198 CMJ Radio Top 200; #19 CMJ RPM Charts)
- Relax into the Abyss – (CD LP) 2000 – Metropolis, Hymen Records • 2000 – Hymen Records (#29 CMJ RPM Charts)
- Beyond The Valley of the Proles – (CD LP) 2003 – Metropolis, Hymen Records, Karmic Hit
- Snog vs. The Faecal Juggernaut of Mass Culture – (CD Album, Enhanced) 2006 – Metropolis, Psy-Harmonics
- The Last Days of Rome – (CD LP) 2007 – Metropolis, Hymen Records, Psy-Harmonics • (CD EP) 2007 – Psy-Harmonics • (AAC file) 2007 – Metropolis
- Last of the Great Romantics – (CD LP) 2010 – Metropolis
- Babes in Consumerland – (CD LP) April 2013
- Compliance™ – (CD, Digital Release) October 2015
- Lullabies for the Lithium Age – (Vinyl, CD, Digital Release) 24 April 2020 – Metropolis
- Eight Offerings for the Undead – (Vinyl, CD, Digital) 4 February 2022 – Lightarmour Editions – Metropolis

=== Singles ===
- Corporate Slave – (12", CD Maxi) 1992 – Machinery
- Shop – (12", CD Maxi) 1992 – Machinery • (CD single) 1993 – Id
- Born To Be Mild – (CD Maxi) 1993 – Machinery, Id
- Hey, Christian God – (CD Maxi) 1993 – Id
- Cliché – (CD Maxi) 1994 – Machinery • (CD single) 1994 – Id
- The Future – (CD Maxi) 1995 – Metropolis, Id • (CD) 1996 – Zoth Ommog
- ...Make the Little Flowers Grow – (CD Maxi) 1997 – Shock
- Hooray!!! – (CD Maxi) 1997 – Shock • (CD Maxi) 1998 – Metropolis
- The Ballad – (CD Maxi) 1998 – Shock
- The Human Germ – (CD Maxi) 1998 – Metropolis
- Justified Homicide – (CD Enhanced, Ltd. Ed) 2001 – Karmic Hit
- Fill My Hole – (CD Promo) 2003 – Karmic Hit
- Real Estate Man (The Rema[k]es) – (12") 2005 – [k]rack-troni[k]
- Real Estate Man Plus – (CD Maxi) 2005 – Hymen Records
- Crash Crash Rema[k]es – (12") 2006 – [k]rack-troni[k]
- Crash Crash vs. Remixes and Exclusive Tracks – (CD Maxi) 2006 – Psy-Harmonics • (AAC file) 2006 – Metropolis
- Planet of Shit – (CD Maxi) 2006 – Psy-Harmonics • (AAC file) 2006 – Metropolis
- The Kings of Hate – (CD Maxi Enhanced) 2006 – Psy-Harmonics • (AAC file) 2006 – Metropolis
- City – (CDr, Single Promo) 2007 – Psy-Harmonics
- Vaguely Melancholic – (CDr, Single Promo) 2007 – Metropolis
- City – (CD EP) 2008 – Metropolis
- "The Plug-In Drug" (12" vinyl) – M-Tronic
- Everything Is Under Control – (CD EP) 2013 – Metropolis
- Cheerful Hypocrisy – (CD, Digital Release) September 2015
- The Clockwork Man – (12" Vinyl) 2015 – Metropolis
- Rich Kuntz – (Single, Digital Release) 2016 – Metropolis
- The Clockwork Man – (Single, Digital Release) 2016 – Metropolis

=== Other ===
- Dear Valued Customer/Live in the Global Village' – (2xCD) 1994 – Id
- Lies Inc./Lies Inc. The Special Edition (2xCD) 1996 – Id
- Remote Control – (CD) 1996 – Metropolis
- Dear Valued Customer/The Remix Files – (2xCD) 1998 – Rollercoaster Recordings
- I Snog, Therefore I Am – (LP) 1999 – Hymen Records • (2xCD) 1999 – Hymen Records
- Lies Inc./Dear Valued Customer – (2xCD LP) 2000 – Metropolis
- Beyond The Valley of the Proles/Your Favorite Electro-Folk-Swingers – (2xLP) 2003 – Hymen Records
- Your Favorite Electro-Folk-Swingers – (CD) 2003 – Karmic Hit
- Sixteen Easy Tunes for the End Times – (CD LP, Enhanced) 2006 – Metropolis, Solnze Records, Karmic Hit
- The Dissolving Satellite of Egoism Overturned – (CD LP) 2010 – Hymen Records

=== DVDs ===
- Adventures in Capitalism – (DVD) 2003 – Metropolis

=== Sound Tracks ===
- Pearls Before Swine – Movie Soundtrack 1999 – (contributed tracks, alongside NON and Death in June)

== See also ==
- Electronic music
- Music of Melbourne
