= David Thrussell =

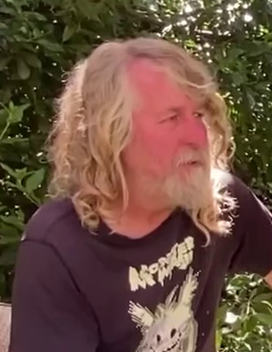
- Thrussell in 2022

Background information
- Born: Australia
- Genres: Dark ambient, EBM, Electro-industrial, experimental, IDM, Industrial, techno
- Occupation: Musician
- Instruments: Sampler, synthesizer, vocals
- Years active: 1988–present
- Labels: Ant-Zen

David Thrussell is an Australian musician and a prolific composer of a wide range of genres. He is a founding member of the dark ambient and IDM outfits Snog and Soma as well as his work under the moniker Black Lung.

== Black Lung ==
In 1994 Thrussell released Silent Weapons for Quiet Wars, an album of B-sides from Snog's lengthy Australian CD singles for the German market - the Australian singles were up to 80 minutes, whereas chart-eligible singles in Germany could not be more than 21 minutes, so many tracks were left over. The album was mostly composed of instrumental tracks taken from Snog's first album Lies Inc. and the Hey, Christian God single. (A year later, the album was also released on Germany's Machinery Records as Silent Weapons for Silent Wars. Thrussell disowned this later release due to the incorrect title, changes made to the artwork, and the fact that the tracks were in the wrong order, destroying the album's continuity.)

Since 1999, nearly all Black Lung releases have been on German industrial label Ant-Zen. In 1999, Thrussell collaborated with John Sellekaers from Xingu Hill to produce the 10" EP The Andronechron Incident, purportedly a soundtrack for an obscure Italian science fiction film. A full-length CD of the same title, containing many more additional tracks, was released in 2002 .

Thematically, Thrussell has used the project as an opportunity to indulge his fascination with conspiracy theories, with many album and track titles referencing conspiracies. Silent Weapons for Quiet Wars, refers to a document which came to light in the mid 1980s detailing a New World Order plan. Rhic-Edom is a direct reference to the acronym RHIC-EDOM: Radio-Hypnotic Intracerebral Control & Electronic Dissolution of Memory. The albums' liner notes frequently contain essays on various esoteric subjects, excerpted from conspiracy books or written by Thrussell himself.

2014 saw the return of the project with a vinyl release of "The Business Of Selling" on M-Tronic records as a limited edition of 300 copies.

In 2017 he was interviewed by the Data.Wave webzine.

== Discography ==
=== Albums ===
List of albums credited to David Thrussell, with selected details
Title	Details
Confessions of a Non-Apologist (Music for Film and Other Media)	Released: 2000; Format: CD; Label: Best Boy (THRUSSELL-1)
The Voices of Reason	Released: 2001 (Germany); Format: CD; Label: Ant-Zen (act 120)
The Hard Word (soundtrack)	Released: 2002; Format: CD; Label: Universal Music Australia (0183202)
The Wonderful World of David Thrussell (Soundscapes for the Cinematically Inclined)	Released: 2004; Format: CD; Label: Festival (THRUSSELL-2)
The Soundtrack Mastermind	Released: 2005; Format: CD; Label: Festival (THRUSSELL-3)
The Fetid Fungi	Released: September 2007 (Germany); Format: CD; Label: Ant-Zen (act 199)
Eros Maximus	Released: 2025; Format: Vinyl; Label: Ant-Zen (act 480)

=== Albums ===
List of albums credited to Black Lung, with selected details
Title	Details
Silent Weapons for Quiet Wars	Released: 1994; Format: CD; Label: Dorobo (DOROBO 005)
The Depopulation Bomb	Released: 1994; Format: CD; Label: Iridium (Ir 193.1)
The Disinformation Plague	Released: 1996; Format: CD; Label: Nova Zembla (NZ 062), Helix² (helix 106)
The Psychocivilised Society	Released: 1997; Format: CD; Label: Nova Zembla (NZ 092)
Extraordinary Popular Delusions	Released: 1998; Format: CD; Label: Nova Zembla (NZ 096)
The Andronechron Incident (with Xingu Hill)	Released: March 1999; Format: LP; Label: Ant-Zen (act92)
The Great Architect	Released: 1999; Format: CD; Label: Nova Zembla (NZ 107)
The Wonderful and Frightening World of Black Lung	Released: 1999; Format: 2×CD; Label: Rollercoaster Recordings (ROLLERCD002); Note: Compilation
The Grand Chessboard	Released: 2004; Format: CD, LP; Label: Ant-Zen (act164)
The Coming Dark Age	Released: 2005; Format: CD, LP; Label: Ant-Zen (act194)
Full Spectrum Dominance	Released: 2009; Format: CD, LP, Digital; Label: Ant-Zen (act234)
The Soul Consumer	Released: 2010; Format: CD, Digital; Label: Ad Noiseam (Ad Noiseam)
The Great Golden Goal	Released: 2014; Format: CD, Digital; Label: Ant-Zen (act314)
Innovation. Participation. Reward	Released: 2014; Format: CD, Digital; Label: Ant-Zen (act317)
Muzak From The Hive Mind	Released: 2015; Format: CD, Digital; Label: Ant-Zen (act324)
NXIVM	Released: 2019; Format: Digital; Label: Ant-Zen (dig059)
The Great Manipulator	Released: May 2019; Format: CD, LP, Digital; Label: Metropolis (MET 1177)

== Awards and nominations ==
=== ARIA Music Awards ===
The ARIA Music Awards is an annual awards ceremony that recognises excellence, innovation, and achievement across all genres of Australian music. They commenced in 1987.

Year	Nominee / work	Award	Result	Ref.
2002	The Hard Word	Best Original Soundtrack	Nominated	
