= Dead Voices on Air =

British musical project

- Origin: United Kingdom and Canada
- Genres: Experimental; Dark ambient Industrial
- Years active: 1992–present
- Labels: G.R.O.S.S. Invisible; Hypnotic; Lens Records; Tourette Records
- Members: Mark Spybey

Dead Voices on Air is Mark Spybey's experimental and industrial project formed after his departure from Zoviet France. Dead Voices on Air has collaborated with artists such as Not Breathing and cEvin Key of Skinny Puppy in the band Download.

== Discography ==
- Abrader (1993, cassette only. G.R.O.S.S. Records)
- Hafted Maul (1995, Invisible Records)
- New Words Machine (1995, Hypnotic Records)
- Shap (1996, Invisible Records)
- How Hollow Heart... (1997, Invisible Records)
- Dead Voices on Air versus Not Breathing - A Fire in the Bronx Zoo (1997, Invisible Records)
- Piss Frond (1999, Invisible Records)
- Frankie Pett Presents... The Happy Submarines (2000, Invisible Records)
- Live (2001, Invisible Records)
- From Labrador to Madagascar (2006, Invisible Records)
- Fast Falls the Eventide (2009, Invisible Records)
- The Light of June Drowned Flowers in Your Mouth (Limited 12" vinyl edition) (2009, Brudenia)
- From Afar All Stars Spark And Glee (2010, Lens Records)
- The Silent Wing (2010, Tourette Records)
- Michael and the Angels Fought (2011, Lens Records)
- Mawson's Will And Other Stories (2012, Ewers Tonkunst)
- Bundle 1995–2013 (2013, Metropolis Records)
- Lewis Spybey (2024, Emergency Hearts Records)
