= Throbbing Gristle discography =

Band discography

The following is the discography of the industrial music group Throbbing Gristle.

== Discography ==
=== Albums ===
- The Second Annual Report (1977 Industrial Records)
- D.o.A: The Third and Final Report of Throbbing Gristle (1978 Industrial Records)
- 20 Jazz Funk Greats (1979 Industrial Records)
- Journey Through a Body (1982 Walter Ulbricht Schallfolien)
- In the Shadow of the Sun (1984 Illuminated Records)
- CD1 (1986 Mute)
- TG Now (2004 Mute)
- Part Two: The Endless Not (2007 Mute)
- The Third Mind Movements (2009 Industrial Records)

=== Singles ===
- "United/Zyklon B Zombie" (1978 Industrial Records)
- "We Hate You (Little Girls)/Five Knuckle Shuffle" (1979 Sordide Sentimental)
- "Subhuman/Something Came Over Me" (1980 Industrial Records)
- "Adrenalin/Distant Dreams (Part Two)" (1980 Industrial Records)
- "Discipline" (1981 Fetish Records)
- "Wotwududo/Trumpet Herald (Live)" (2024 Electronic Sound)

=== Compilations ===
- Greatest Hits (1980 Rough Trade)
- Five Albums Box set (1982 Fetish Records)
- Music from the Death Factory Box set (1991 The Grey Area)
- Music from the Death Factory 2 Box set (1991 The Grey Area)
- TG Box 1 Box set (1991 Alfa Records, Inc)
- The Taste of TG (2004 Mute)
- Mutant Throbbing Gristle (2004 NovaMute)
- 20 Jazz Funk Greats, 2CD remastered + bonus CD (2012 Industrial)
- D.o.A: The Third and Final Report of Throbbing Gristle, plus bonus CD (2012 Industrial)

=== Studio cassette releases ===
- Best of Throbbing Gristle Volume I (1976, Industrial Records)
- Best of Throbbing Gristle Volume II (1977, Industrial Records)
- Pastimes/Industrial Muzak (1979, Industrial Records)

=== Live releases ===
Audio:

- Heathen Earth (1980 Industrial Records)
- Mission of Dead Souls (1981 Fetish Records)
- Beyond Jazz Funk (Nov 1981, Rough Tapes/Rough Trade)
- Throbbing Gristle Live, Volume 1: 1976–1978 (1993 The Grey Area)
- Throbbing Gristle Live, Volume 2: 1977–1978 (1993 The Grey Area)
- Throbbing Gristle Live, Volume 3: 1978–1979 (1993 The Grey Area)
- Throbbing Gristle Live, Volume 4: 1979–1980 (1993 The Grey Area)
- TG24 1 Hour Sample promo (2002 Industrial Records)
- 24 hours (1980 Industrial Records)
- TG24 Box set (2002 The Grey Area)
- TG+ Box set (2004 The Grey Area)
- Live December 2004 A Souvenir of Camber Sands (2004 Mute/Industrial Records)
- untitled 3" CD (2005 --)
  - Distributed to "Uber Ticket" holders of their 29 June 2005 concert. Contains two songs ("What A Day"/"P.A. Destroyer") on a single 15:07 track from the 29 June 2005 concert in Turin, Italy. The CD is a burnt CD-R, hand numbered and limited to 200 copies.
- The Desertshore Installation Box set (2007 Industrial Records)
- The Thirty-Second Annual Report (2008 Industrial Records)

Video:

- Oundle School, 16th March 1980 VHS (1980 Industrial Records) [Live in Peterborough, England]
- The Recording Of The Heathen Earth Album VHS (1980 Industrial Records)
- Recording Heathen Earth / Live At Oundle School VHS (1983 Doublevision)
- Destiny (Lyceum, London, England 8 February 1981) VHS (1990 Jettisoundz)
- Mission Of Dead Souls – The Last Live Performance Of TG VHS (1991 Jettisoundz) [Live in Kezar Pavilion, San Francisco, USA 29 May 1981]
- TGV 7xDVD Box set (2007 Mute/Industrial Records)

== Bootlegs ==
=== Studio ===
- Nothing Short Of Total War (Tape) first version released 1981, recorded 1976 - 1977 (The later vinyl version on ''Cause for Concern'' claims 1977-1980 on the back cover, but that is not consistent with their sound post 1977)
- "23 Drifts To Guestling" (Tape) released 1982, recorded various
- Giftgas (CD) released 1994, recorded allegedly September 1975, but sounds more like later 1976-77
- Kreeme Horn In Praise Of The Grotesque (CD) released 1997, recorded allegedly late 1975 or early 1976, but the sounds hint more to late 1976 into 1977
- The First Annual Report (LP/CD) (2001 Thirsty Ear), recorded allegedly in 1975, but in fact in 1976

=== Live ===
Audio:

- Fuhrer Der Menscheit, aka S.O. 36 Berlin (10") 1981
- Funeral In Berlin (12") 1981
- The Kill: Live At Scala Cinema (12") 1984
- Assume Power Focus (12", CD) 1982, 1995
- Thee Psychick Sacrifice (2X12") 1981
- Rafters/Psychic Rally (12", CD) 1982, 2000
- Editions... Frankfurt... Berlin (12") 1983
- Mission Is Terminated (2X12") 1983
- Once Upon A Time (12", CD) 1984, 1990
- Special Treatment (12") 1984
- Sacrifice (12") 1986
- Live At Death Factory (12") 1980
- Funk Beyond Jazz (CD) 1993
- At The Highbury Roundhouse, London (CD) 1994
- Live At Roundhouse (CD) 1995
- Grief (CD) 2001
- Blood Pressure (CD) 1995
- Dimensia in Excelsis (LP/CD) 1998

Video:

- Guildhall, Northampton, England 26 May 1979
- Goldsmith College, London, England 13 March 1980
- Sheffield University, Sheffield, England 10 June 1980
- Kunsthofschule, Frankfurt, W. Germany 10 November 1980
- Rafters, Manchester, England 4 December 1980
- Heaven, London, England 23 December 1980

== Related releases ==
Video:

- Psychic Rally In Heaven (Derek Jarman short film featuring TG live footage and music)
- In the Shadow of the Sun (Derek Jarman film with two TG soundtracks)
- The Mask Of Sarnath (20 minute Horror film with soundtrack by TG)
- After Cease To Exist (The Legendary Coum film)
- Genesis TV interview post-Prostitution show

== See also ==
- Psychic TV discography
