= The Grey Area of Mute Records discography =

The Grey Area is a Mute Records division founded in 1990 to restore and reissue the catalogue of artists who influenced Daniel Miller, head of Mute Records, and to reissue previous recordings of Mute artists. In 1983, Mute had to partner with Industrial Records for the reissue of Throbbing Gristle albums. This division was created following the partnerships signed with Can and Cabaret Voltaire.

== Throbbing Gristle / Industrial Records ==
- TGCD 1 - CD 1 (1988)
- TGCD 2 - The Second Annual Report of Throbbing Gristle (re-released 1991)
- TGCD 3 - D.o.A: The Third and Final Report of Throbbing Gristle (re-released 1991)
- TGCD 4 - 20 Jazz Funk Greats (re-released 1991)
- TGCD 5 - Heathen Earth (re-released 1991)
- TGCD 6 - Mission of Dead Souls - The Last Live Performance of Throbbing Gristle` (re-released 1991)
- TGCD 7 - Throbbing Gristle's Greatest Hits (re-released 1990)
- TGCD 8 - Journey Through A Body (re-released 1993)
- TGCD 9 - In the Shadow of the Sun (re-released 1993)
- TGCD 10 - Throbbing Gristle Live volume 1: 1976-78 (1993)
- TGCD 11 - Throbbing Gristle Live volume 2: 1977-78 (1993)
- TGCD 12 - Throbbing Gristle Live volume 3: 1978-79 (1993)
- TGCD 13 - Throbbing Gristle Live volume 4: 1979-80 (1993)
- TGCD 14 - The Taste of TG (2004)
- TGCD 15 - TG+ (2004)
- TGCD 16 - Part Two: The Endless Not (2007)
- TGDVD 17 - TGV - The Video Archive Of Throbbing Gristle (2007)
- TGCD 24 - TG24 (2002)
- RETG 1 CD - TG Now (2004)
- TG CS 1 CD - Live December 2004 A Souvenir of Camber Sands (2004)

=== 2017–18 Remastered ===
- TGCD2 - The Second Annual Report of Throbbing Gristle (Remastered) (2017)
- TGCD3 - D.o.A: The Third and Final Report of Throbbing Gristle (Remastered) (2019)
- TGCD4 - 20 Jazz Funk Greats (Remastered) (2017)
- TGCD5 - Heathen Earth (Remastered) (2018)
- TGCD6 - Mission Of Dead Souls (Remastered) (2018)
- TGCD7 - Throbbing Gristle's Greatest Hits (Remastered) (2019)
- TGCD8 - Journey Through A Body (Remastered) (2018)
- TGCD14 - The Taste of TG (A Beginner's Guide to the Music of Throbbing Gristle) (2017 reissue)
- TGCD18 - The Thirty-Second Annual Report of Throbbing Gristle (2017 digital only reissue)
- TGCD19 - Part Two: The Endless Not / TG Now (2019 reissue)
- TGCD20 - Live December 2004 A Souvenir of Camber Sands (2019 reissue)
- TGSINGLE2 - "Subhuman / Something Came Over Me" (2018 digital only reissue)
- TGSINGLE3 - "Adrenalin / Distant Dreams, Pt. 2" (2018 digital only reissue)

== Chris Carter ==
- CC1CD - The Space Between (re-released 1991)
- CCBOX1 - Miscellany (box set) (2018)
- CCLP2 - Mondo Beat (re-released 2019)
- CCLP3 - Disobedient (re-released 2019)
- CCLP4 - Small Moon (re-released 2019)
- CCALP1 - Archival 1973 to 1977 (2019)
- CCEAR1 - Electronic Ambient Remixes One (re-released 2021)
- CCEAR3 - Electronic Ambient Remixes Three (re-released 2021)

== Thomas Leer & Robert Rental ==
- BRIDGE 1CD - The Bridge (re-released 1992)

== Monte Cazazza ==
- MONTE 1CD - The Worst of Monte Cazazza (1992)

== Can / Spoon Records ==
- SPOON 1/2 - Cannibalism, Can (re-released 1989)
- SPOON 4 - Monster Movie, Can (re-released 1989)
- SPOON 5 - Soundtracks, Can (re-released 1989)
- SPOON 6/7 - Tago Mago, Can (re-released 1989)
- SPOON 8 - Ege Bamyasi, Can (re-released 1989)
- SPOON 9 - Future Days, Can (re-released 1989)
- SPOON 10 - Soon Over Babaluma, Can (re-released 1989)
- SPOON CD 11 - Toy Planet, Irmin Schmidt & (re-released 1994 & 2016)
- SPOON 12 - Delay 1968, Can (re-released 1989)
- SPOON CD 15 - Canaxis, Holger Czukay & Rolf Dammers (re-released 1995)
- SPOON CD 16 - Deluge, Michael Karoli & Polly Estes (re-released 1995)
- SPOON CD 17 - Nowhere, Jaki Liebezeit - Phantom Band (re-released 1995)
- SPOON CD 21 - Cannibalism II, Can (1992)
- SPOON CD 22 - Cannibalism III, Can Solo Recordings - Various (1995)
- SPOON 23/24 - Unlimited Edition, Can (re-released 1991)
- SPOON 25 - Landed, Can (re-released 1991)
- SPOON 26 - Flow Motion, Can (re-released 1991)
- SPOON 27 - Saw Delight, Can (re-released 1991)
- SPOON 28 - Can, Can (re-released 1991)
- SPOON 29 - Rite Time, Can (re-released 1994)
- SPOON CD 30/31 - Anthology 1968-1993, Can (1994)
- SPOON CD 32/33/34 - Anthology - Soundtracks 1978-1993, Irmin Schmidt (1994)
- SPOON 32/33/34 - Filmmusik Anthology Volume 1, 2 & 3, Irmin Schmidt (re-released 2016)
- SPOON CD 35 - Movies, Holger Czuckay (re-released 1998)
- SPOON CD 36 - In The Way to The Peak of Normal, Holger Czuckay (re-released 1998)
- SPOON CD 37/38 - Musk At Dusk / Impossible Days, Irmin Schmidt (re-released 1998)
- SPOON 37 - Musk At Dusk, Irmin Schmidt (re-released 2016)
- SPOON 38 - Impossible Holidays, Irmin Schmidt (re-released 2016)
- SPOON 39/40 - Sacrilege, Can (1997)
- SPOON 41 - Box, Can (1999)
- SPOON CD 42/43 - Can Live, Can (1999)
- SPOON CD 44 - Gormenghast, Irmin Schmidt (2000, re-released 2016)
- SPOON CD 45 - Masters of Confusion, Irmin Schmidt & Kumo (2001, re-released 2016)
- SPOON CD 46 - 1+1=1, Kumo (2000)
- SPOON DVD 47 - Can DVD, Can (2003)
- SPOON047 - "I Want More", Can (re-released 2006)
- 12SPOON047 - "I Want More", Can (2006)
- CD SPOON 48 - Axolotl Eyes, Irmin Schmidt & Kumo (2008)
- DVD SPOON 49 - Flies, Guys and Choirs, Irmin Schmidt & Kumo (2008)
- SPOON 50 - Palermo Shooting, Irmin Schmidt (2008) (digital only release)
- SPOON 51 - Out of Reach, Can (re-released 2014)
- CD SPOON 52/53 - Filmmusik Anthology Volume 4 & 5, Irmin Schmidt (2009)
- 40 SPOON 6/7 - Tago Mago (40th Anniversary Edition), Can (2011)
- SPOON 55 - The Lost Tapes, Can (2012)
- SPOON 56 - Cyclopean, Cyclopean (2013)
- SPOON 57/58 - Villa Wunderbar, Irmin Schmidt (2013)
- SPOON 59 - Filmmusik Anthology Volume 6, Irmin Schmidt (2016)
- SPOON 60 - The Singles, Can (2017)
- SPOON 61 - 5 Klavierstücke, Irmin Schmidt (2018)
- SPOON 62 - Nocturne (Live At The Huddersfield Contemporary Music Festival), Irmin Schmidt (2020)
- SPOON 63 - Live in Stuttgart 1975, CAN (2021)
- IRMINBOX1 - Electro Violet (box set), Irmin Schmidt (2015)

Notes :

== Diamanda Galás ==
- ISO 1 - The Litanies of Satan (re-released 1989)

== Swell Maps ==
- CD MAPS 1 - A Trip to Marineville (re-released 1989)
- CD MAPS 2 - Jane from Occupied Europe (re-released 1989)
- CD MASP 3 - Train Out of It (re-released 1991)

== Cabaret Voltaire ==
- CABS 1 - "Nag Nag Nag / Yashar" (1990)
- CABS 2 - The Voice of America (re-released 1990)
- CABS 3 - Red Mecca (re-released 1990)
- CABS 4 - Live at the YMCA 27.10.79 (re-released 1990)
- CABS 5 - Listen Up With Cabaret Voltaire (1990)
- CABS 6 - The Living Legends... (1990)
- CABS 7 - Three Mantras (re-released 1990)
- CABS 8 - Mix-Up (re-released 1990)
- CABS 9 - 2X45 (re-released 1990)
- CABS 10 - Johnny Yesno (The Original Soundtrack From The Motion Picture) (re-released 1990)
- CABS 11 - Hai! (re-released 1991)
- CABS 13 - Live at the Lyceum (re-released 1991)
- CABS 14 - The Drain Train / Live In Sheffield 19 Jan 82 (re-released 1991)
- CABS 15 - 1974-76 (re-released 1992)
- CABS 16 - The Original Sound Of Sheffield '78/'82. Best Of (2002)
- CABS 17 - Methodology '74/'78. Attic Tapes; (2003)
- CABS 18 DVD - Doublevision Present: Cabaret Voltaire (re-released 2004)
- 12 CABS 19 - "Nag Nag Nag (R H Kirk Reworks)" (2003)
- CAB 20 DVD - Johnny Yesno Redux (2 CD + 2 DVD) (2011)
- CABS 21 - #8385 Collected Works 1983-1985 (boxset) (2013)
- CABS 22 - The Crackdown (re-released 2013)
- CABS 23 - Micro-Phonies (re-released 2013)
- CABS 24 - Drinking Gasoline (re-released 2014)
- CABS 25 - The Covenant, The Sword and the Arm of the Lord (re-released 2013)
- CABS 26 - #7885 (Electropunk to Technopop 1978 – 1985) (compilation) (2014)
- CABS 27 - CODE (re-released 2017)
- CABS 28 - Groovy, Laidback and Nasty (re-released 2017)
- CABS 29 - Chance Versus Causality (2019)
- CABS 30 - Shadow Of Fear (2020)
- CABS 31 - Dekadron (2021)
- CABS 32 - BN9Drone (2021)

== Richard H. Kirk ==
- KIRK 1CD - Disposable Half-Truths (re-released 1992)
- KIRK 2CD - Time High Fiction (re-released 1994)
- KIRK 3CD - Black Jesus Voice (re-released 1995)
- KIRK 4CD - Ugly Spirit (re-released 1995)
- KIRK 5CD - Hoodoo Talk, Peter Hope & Richard H. Kirk (re-released 2000)
- KIRK 6CD - Earlier / Later - Unreleased Projects Anthology 74-89 (re-released 2004)
- 12 KIRK 6 - "Detonate / Reworks EP" (2004)
- KIRK 7CD - Digital Lifeforms (Redux), Sandoz (re-released 2004)
- 12 KIRK 7 - "Return To The Heart Of Darkness / Reworks EP", Sandoz (2004)
- KIRK 8 - Intensely Radioactive, Sandoz (re-released 2017)
- KIRK 9 - Dark Continent, Sandoz (re-released 2017)
- KIRKBX1 - #7489 (collected works 1974 - 1989) (2016)
- SANDOZBX1 - #9294 (collected works 1992 – 1994), Sandoz (2016)

== Stephen Mallinder ==
- MAL 1CD - Pow Wow Plus (re-released 1992)

== The Hafler Trio ==
- KUT 1CD - "Bang!" - An Open Letter (re-released 1994)
- KUT 2CD - Walk Gently Through the Gates of Joy (re-released 1994)
- KUT 3CD - Seven Hours Sleep (re-released 1994)
- KUT 4CD - Four Ways of Saying Five (re-released 1993)
- KUT 5CD - All That Rises Must Converges (re-released 1993)
- KUT 6CD - A Thirsty Fish (re-released 1992)

== Einstürzende Neubauten ==
- EGO 111 CD - Die Hamletmaschine (1991)
- EGO 112 CD - Strategies Against Architecture II (1992)
- EGO 501 CD - Faustmusik (1996)
- EGO 1101 CD - Berlin Babylon (2001)

== Die Krupps ==
- KRUPPS 1CD - Metall Maschinen Musik 91-81 Past Forward (1991)

== Wire ==
- WIRE 80 CD - Document and Eyewitness (re-released 1991)

== Dome ==
- DOME 12 CD - 1 + 2 (re-released 1992)
- DOME 34 CD - 3 + 4 (re-released 1992)

== SPK ==
- SPK 1CD - Information Overload Unit (re-released 1992)
- SPK 2CD - Leichenschrei (re-released 1992)
- SPK 3CD - Zamia Lehmanni: Songs of Byzantine Flowers (re-released 1992)
- SPK 4CD - Auto Da Fe (re-released 1993)

== Zoviet France ==
- SION 1 - Collusion (1993)

== The Boys Next Door ==
- DOOR CD1 - Door, Door (re-released 1993)

== Laibach ==
- NSK 1CD - Ljubljana-Zagreb-Beograd (1993)
- NSK 2CDX - Occupied Europe NATO Tour 1994-95 (1996)
- NSK 3CD - M.B. December 21, 1984 (1997)
- NSK 5 - Revisited (2020)

== Deutsch Amerikanische Freundschaft ==
- DAF 0CD - Ein Produkt der Deutsch Amerikaischen Freundschaft (re-released 2000)
- DAF 1CD - Alles ist gut (re-released 1998)
- DAF 2CD - Gold und Liebe (re-released 1998)
- DAF 3CD - Für immer (re-released 1998)
- 12 DAF123 - "Der Mussolini" (1998)
- DAF 4CD - Das Best von DAF (2009)

== NON ==
- PAGAN 1 - Pagan Muzak (re-released 1999)

== Buzzcocks ==
- SCRATCH 1 - "Spiral Scratch" (re-released 2000)
- SCRATCH 2 - Time's Up (re-released 2000)

== Virgin Prunes ==
- YEO 1CD - A New Form Of Beauty (re-released 2004)
- YEO 2CD - ...If I Die, I Die (re-released 2004)
- YEO 3CD - Hérésie (re-released 2004)
- YEO 4CD - The Moon Looked Down And Laughed (re-released 2004)
- YEO 5CD - Over The Rainbow (re-released 2004)
- 12 YEO 6 - "An Extended Play" (2004)

== BBC Radiophonic Workshop ==
- DRWRW 1 - Doctor Who at the BBC Radiophonic Workshop Volume 1: The Early Years 1963-1969 (re-released 2005)
- DRWRW 2 - Doctor Who at the BBC Radiophonic Workshop Volume 2: New Beginnings 1970-1980 (re-released 2005)
- PHONIC 1CD - BBC Radiophonic Music (re-released 2008)
- PHONIC 2CD - The Radiophonic Workshop (re-released 2008)
- PHONIC 3CD - BBC Radiophonic Workshop – A Retrospective (2008)

== Various Artists ==
- A GREY 1 - The Tyranny Of The Beat - Original Soundtracks From The Grey Area (1991)
