= The Taste of TG =

Compilation album by Throbbing Gristle
- Released: 4 May 2004
- Genre: Industrial; experimental
- Length: 59:06
- Label: Mute TGCD14

Throbbing Gristle chronology
Mutant Throbbing Gristle (2004)	The Taste of TG (2004)	TG Now (2004)

Professional ratings
Review scores
Source	Rating
AllMusic	4/5 stars
Pitchfork	7.9/10

The Taste of TG (subtitled A Beginner's Guide to the Music of Throbbing Gristle) is a compilation album by Throbbing Gristle. The cover art is a manipulation by Peter Christopherson of a still from the Pier Paolo Pasolini film Salò o le 120 giornate di Sodoma.

== Track listing ==
1. "Industrial Introduction" - 1:05
2. "Distant Dreams (Part Two)" - 5:30
3. "Persuasion USA" - 7:29
4. "Something Came Over Me" - 3:43
5. "Dead on Arrival" - 6:08
6. "Hot on the Heels of Love" - 4:24
7. "We Hate You (Little Girls)" - 2:07
8. "United" - 4:04
9. "Cabaret Voltaire" - 3:58
10. "Exotic Functions" - 4:18
11. "Zyclon B Zombie" - 3:52
12. "Walkabout" - 3:04
13. "Hamburger Lady" - 4:15
14. "Almost a Kiss" - 6:43
15. "His Arm Was Her Leg" - 5:40
- Tracks 1, 8, 11 from TGCD2 (The Second Annual Report)
- Tracks 2, 3, & 4 from TGCD6 (Mission of Dead Souls)
- Tracks 5, 7, & 13 from TGCD3 (D.o.A: The Third and Final Report)
- Tracks 6 & 12 from TGCD4 (20 Jazz Funk Greats)
- Track 9 from TGCD11 (TG Box 1|Throbbing Gristle Live, Volume 2: 1977-1978)
- Track 10 from TGCD8 (Journey Through a Body)
- Track 14 from TGCD16 (Part Two: The Endless Not)
- Track 15 from TGCD12 (TG Box 1|Throbbing Gristle Live, Volume 3: 1978-1979)
