= Five Albums =

Box set by Throbbing Gristle
- Released: 1981
- Recorded: 1976–1981
- Genre: Industrial
- Label: Fetish

Five Albums is a box set by Throbbing Gristle, released in 1981 through record label Fetish, containing the band's three studio albums and two live albums.

All individual record covers are in black and white as opposed to the full-colour original issues. The set was limited to 5000 copies, all of which came with a badge and a book called Throbbing Gristle, described on the back cover as "an historical booklet on the activities of TG", which includes previously unpublished retrospective articles by Bruce Elder and Jon Savage and many rare illustrations of ephemera and performances.

== Albums included ==
- The Second Annual Report (1977)
- D.o.A: The Third and Final Report (1978)
- 20 Jazz Funk Greats (1979)
- Heathen Earth (1980; live)
- Mission of Dead Souls (1981; live)

== Charts ==
Chart (1982)	Peak position
UK Indie Chart	23
