= Dimensia in Excelsis =

Live album by Throbbing Gristle
- Released: November 1998
- Recorded: 22 May 1981
- Genre: Industrial; electronic
- Length: 49:20
- Label: Tesco Organisation

Dimensia in Excelsis is an album by the British industrial group Throbbing Gristle. The music was recorded live at the Veterans Auditorium in Los Angeles on 22 May 1981. The album was released in November 1998 under the German label Tesco Organisation in LP record and compact disc format. The album is actually considered to be a bootleg recording; see Throbbing Gristle bootleg discography.

Dimensia is likely to be an intended misspelling of the word dementia, but it is also the name of a high-end television system produced by RCA in the 80s; see RCA Dimensia.

== Track listing ==
=== Side one ===
1. "Dimensia" 4:51
2. "Scorched Earth" 6:39
3. "Tangible" 1:04
4. "Carnality" 5:43
5. "Marriage Carriage" 6:06

=== Side two ===
1. "Still Walking" 5:51
2. "Slam" 8:54
3. "Principia Disciplina" 6:19
4. "Forbidden" 3:23
