= The Third Mind Movements =

2009 album by Throbbing Gristle

Studio album by Throbbing Gristle
- Released: 16 April 2009
- Genre: Industrial
- Length: 60:04
- Label: Industrial Records
- Producer: Throbbing Gristle

Throbbing Gristle chronology
Thirty Second Annual Report (2008)	The Third Mind Movements (2009)	Gristleism (2010)

The Third Mind Movements is the ninth and final studio album released by British industrial group Throbbing Gristle in April 2009 from recordings made at the 2007 Desertshore Installation at the Institute of Contemporary Art on 1 to 3 June 2007 - all of the original line-up were present. It was for sale only at the 2009 USA tour venues and was later sold through the band's website.

The album was re-issued by Mute Records in 2024.

== Reception ==
Reviewing the reissue for Pitchfork, Jesse Dorris said that while the album "lacks the hooks and holy fury of the other post-reunion albums, the jams come thick and sweet." Writing for Joy Zine, Paul F Cook said the album came from "the actual golden period of music from the band because not only had technology caught up their ideas but now the group were throwing lots of warmth and dense textures to their music which gives it a huge slab of soul."

== Track listing ==
1. "The Man from Nowhere" – 7:20
2. "Premature" – 8:36
3. "Secluded" – 7:08
4. "Perception Is the Only Reality" – 9:51
5. "Not That I Am" – 4:33
6. "First Movement" – 8:00
7. "Second Movement" – 7:07
8. "Third Movement" – 7:29

== See also ==
- Throbbing Gristle discography
