= We Hate You (Little Girls)/Five Knuckle Shuffle =

1979 single by Throbbing Gristle

"We Hate You (Little Girls)"

Single by Throbbing Gristle
- A-side: "We Hate You (Little Girls)"
- B-side: "Five Knuckle Shuffle"
- Released: May 1979
- Genre: Industrial, noise
- Label: Industrial
- Producer: Throbbing Gristle

Throbbing Gristle singles chronology
"United/Zyklon B Zombie" (1978)	"We Hate You (Little Girls)" (1979)	"Subhuman/Something Came Over Me" (1980)

Alternate cover

"We Hate You (Little Girls)/Five Knuckle Shuffle" is a single by English industrial band Throbbing Gristle. It was released as a limited-edition 7-inch vinyl single by French record label Sordide Sentimental in May 1979.

== Background ==
The A-side, "We Hate You (Little Girls)", plays at 33 RPM, while the B-side, "Five Knuckle Shuffle", is 45 RPM. "Five Knuckle Shuffle" is slang for masturbation.

== Release ==
The single came in a double-gatefold A4-size sleeve. Both tracks were later released on the CD version of D.o.A: The Third and Final Report of Throbbing Gristle.

== Track listing ==
Side A
No.	Title	Length
1.	"We Hate You (Little Girls)"	2:07

Side B
No.	Title	Length
1.	"Five Knuckle Shuffle"	6:42
