= TG Now =

2004 album by Throbbing Gristle

Studio album by Throbbing Gristle
- Released: 16 May 2004
- Recorded: March 2004
- Genre: Industrial
- Length: 45:28
- Label: Industrial

Throbbing Gristle chronology
The Taste of TG (2004)	TG Now (2004)	Live December 2004 A Souvenir of Camber Sands (2004)

Professional ratings
Review scores
Source	Rating
The Spill Magazine	3.5/5 stars

TG Now is the seventh studio album by English industrial band Throbbing Gristle. It was released in 2004 through the band's own record label Industrial Records and was their first album of original material since 1982's Journey Through a Body.

== Release ==
The album's 12" vinyl version was limited to 500 copies and the CD version was limited to 3,000 copies.

== Critical reception ==
PopMatters called the album "an appetizing return from a band that had toyed significantly with the idea of what an artistically valid record release might be."

== Track listing ==
All tracks are written by Throbbing Gristle (Genesis P-Orridge, Cosey Fanni Tutti, Peter Christopherson and Chris Carter).

No.	Title	Length
1.	"X-Ray"	8:36
2.	"Splitting Sky"	12:08
3.	"Almost Like This"	10:47
4.	"How Do You Deal?"	13:57
Total length:		45:28

== Personnel ==
Throbbing Gristle

- Genesis P-Orridge – uncredited performance, recording
- Cosey Fanni Tutti – uncredited performance, recording
- Peter Christopherson – uncredited performance, recording
- Chris Carter – uncredited performance, recording
