= In the Shadow of the Sun (album) =

1984 film score by Throbbing Gristle

Soundtrack album by Throbbing Gristle
- Released: February 1984
- Label: Illuminated

Throbbing Gristle chronology
Editions-Frankfurt, Berlin (1983)	In the Shadow of the Sun (1984)	Sacrifice (1986)

Alternate cover

In the Shadow of the Sun is an improvised musical score by Throbbing Gristle for the 1981 Derek Jarman film of the same name.

== Background ==
In the Shadow of the Sun is an improvised musical score for the film of the same name by Derek Jarman. Throbbing Gristle founder Genesis P-Orridge called the film "ambient video", used to "enhance or complete an environment."

== Musical style ==
Simon Ford, author of the Throbbing Gristle biography Wreckers of Civilisation: The Story of COUM Transmissions & Throbbing Gristle, opined that both the movie and its accompanying soundtrack "revelled in distortion, chance and formlessness." According to Dale Cornish, the recording is "possibly up there with CD1 as the classic TG-goes-a-bit-ambient moment".

== Live performances ==
Throbbing Gristle played a new improvised version of the soundtrack on January 1st 2006 at the Volksbühne in Berlin, which was "complimented with the fantastic addition of choral washes". This concert was released in 2024 by Mute Records as part of the Berlin TG box set. According to Cornish, the rehearsal "seems a touch more visceral than the live version".

In 2007, Throbbing Gristle played the soundtrack "with full choir conducted by Hildur Guðnadóttir" inside the Turbine Hall of Tate Modern, London, and at the Donaufestival in Austria. After seeing the Tate Modern concert, critic Dale Cornish wrote "I recall [...] thinking how odd to have something this beautiful with TG".

Throbbing Gristle played other live versions of the soundtrack during their April 2009 United States tour, as well as in Denmark and Scotland during June 2009.

Psychic TV performed a reinterpreted version of the soundtrack live along with a screening of the film at Cafe Oto in London during their spring 2017 European tour.

== Critical reception ==
Professional ratings
Review scores
Source	Rating
Sounds	3/5 stars

The Wire described the soundtrack as "dark and mournful".

== Track listing ==
All tracks are written by Throbbing Gristle (Chris Carter, Peter Christopherson, Cosey Fanni Tutti, Genesis P-Orridge)

Side A
No.	Title	Length
1.	"In the Shadow of the Sun Pt. 1"

Side B
No.	Title	Length
1.	"In the Shadow of the Sun Pt. 2"

== Charts ==
Chart (1984)	Peak position
UK Indie Chart	23

== Bibliography ==
- Ford, Simon (1999). Wreckers of Civilization: The Story of COUM Transmissions & Throbbing Gristle. London: Black Dog.
- Peake, Tony (1999). Derek Jarman: A Biography. Woodstock, New York: The Overlook Press.
