= Greatest Hits (Throbbing Gristle album) =

Greatest hits album by Throbbing Gristle
- Released: October 1981
- Recorded: 1977–1980
- Length: 39:44
- Label: Rough Trade

Throbbing Gristle chronology
Funeral in Berlin (1981)	Greatest Hits (1981)	Journey Through a Body (1982)

Professional ratings
Review scores
Source	Rating
AllMusic	4/5 stars
Pitchfork	9.0/10

Greatest Hits (subtitled Entertainment Through Pain) is a compilation of Throbbing Gristle material.

== Track listing ==
1. "Hamburger Lady" – 4:11
2. "Hot on the Heels of Love" – 4:21
3. "Subhuman" – 2:58
4. "AB/7A" – 4:49
5. "Six Six Sixties" – 2:07
6. "Blood on the Floor" – 1:16
7. "20 Jazz Funk Greats" – 2:42
8. "Tiab Guls" – 4:19
9. "United" – 4:05
10. "What a Day" – 4:36
11. "Adrenalin" – 4:01
12. (untitled) – 0:39
