= The Desertshore Installation =

Box set by Throbbing Gristle
- Released: 10 June 2007
- Recorded: 1–3 June 2007
- Venue: Institute of Contemporary Arts
- Genre: Industrial
- Label: Industrial

Throbbing Gristle chronology
Part Two: The Endless Not (2007)	The Desertshore Installation (2007)	TGV (2007)

The Desertshore Installation is a box set that was recorded and released by Throbbing Gristle in June 2007. The 12-CDr set documents the recording sessions of the cover version of Nico's third studio album, Desertshore. These recordings were made as a document of TG's Desertshore Installation at the Institute of Contemporary Arts (ICA). These sessions, over three days (1-3 June), were open to the public and a short question and answer session is included in the recordings. Each session lasted for approximately two hours and there were two sessions per day, an afternoon (12–2 p.m) and an evening (7–9 p.m) session. The box set only had one pressing.

A number of jams recorded during the installation appear on Throbbing Gristle's tour-only album release The Third Mind Movements. According to Tutti, the ICA recording sessions were the last time all four band members would record together.

After the band split up in 2010, Tutti, Carter and Christopherson continued work on the project under the name X-TG. The resulting album, Desertshore/The Final Report, was released in 2012.

== CDr information ==
1. Friday Afternoon Disc A - (1:09:02)
2. Friday Afternoon Disc B - (1:04:30)
3. Friday Evening Disc A - (1:02:47)
4. Friday Evening Disc B - (0:54:06)
5. Saturday Afternoon Disc A - (0:48:08)
6. Saturday Afternoon Disc B - (0:47:36)
7. Saturday Evening Disc A - (1:07:58)
8. Saturday Evening Disc B - (0:55:46)
9. Sunday Afternoon Disc A - (0:47:15)
10. Sunday Afternoon Disc B - (1:01:42)
11. Sunday Evening Disc A - (0:46:01)
12. Sunday Evening Disc B - (1:07:02)

== Session set-lists ==
Friday, Session 1:

- My Only Child - Gen Vox & Jam;
- Janitor of Lunacy - Gen Vox & Jam

Friday, Session 2:

- Afraid - Gen Vox;
- Jam to rhythm tracks;
- The Falconer - Gen Vox;

Saturday, Session 3:

- Mutterlein - Gen Vox;
- Jam Session to Mae Blue Gray;
- Le Petit Chevalier - Gen Vox

Saturday, Session 4:

- Abschied- Check;
- Springbankistan - Jam;
- Abschied - Gen Vox;
- Janitors of Lunacy - Vox; Mental Jam;
- The Falconer - Gentle Vox

Sunday, Session 5:

- All that is my own - Jam & Vox;
- The Falconer - Jam & Vox;
- Janitor of Lunacy - Jam & Vox;
- My Only Child - Jam & Vox; Mental Jam;

Sunday, Session 6:

- Le Petit Chevalier - Jam & Vox;
- Mutterlein - Jam & Vox (mental end);
- Afraid - Jam & Vox;
- Abschied - Jam & Vox
