= Mutant Throbbing Gristle =

Remix album by Throbbing Gristle
- Released: 29 March 2004
- Genre: Industrial
- Label: NovaMute NoMu 122

Throbbing Gristle chronology
TG Live, Vol 4 1979-80 (1993)	Mutant Throbbing Gristle (2004)	The Taste of TG (2004)

Professional ratings
Review scores
Source	Rating
AllMusic	2.5/5 stars
Pitchfork	7.2/10

Mutant Throbbing Gristle is a remix album of material originally by Throbbing Gristle.

A limited number of white label promotional 12" vinyl copies were issued with the "TG" logo stamped in black on all four sides and sleeved in a generic grey Novamute sleeve.

== Track listing ==
=== CD (Nomu122CD) ===
1. "Persuasion (Motor Remix)" – 5:01
2. "Hot on the Heels of Love (Carl Craig Re-version)" – 9:05
3. "What A Day (Hedonastik Remix)" – 5:57
4. "United (Two Lone Swordsmen Remix – Vocal Version)" – 5:22
5. "Hamburger Lady" (Carter Tutti Remix) – 4:45
6. "Hot on the Heels of Love (Ratcliffe Remix)" – 8:01
  - Remix by Simon Ratcliffe from Basement Jaxx
7. "Still Walking (Carl Craig Re-version)" – 7:37
8. "HotHeelsUnited" (Carter Tutti Remix) – 6:30

=== 2x12" vinyl (Nomu122LP) ===
Side A

1. "Hot on the Heels of Love (Carl Craig Re-version)" – 9:05

Side B

1. "United (Two Lone Swordsmen Remix – Instrumental Version)" – 5:22
2. "United (Two Lone Swordsmen Remix – Vocal Version)" – 5:17

Side C

1. "HotHeelsUnited (Carter Tutti Remix)" – 6:30
2. "Persuasion (Motor Remix)" – 5:01

Side D

1. "Hot on the Heels of Love (Ratcliffe Remix)" – 8:01
