= The First Annual Report =

Studio album by Throbbing Gristle
- Released: 2001
- Recorded: 1976
- Genre: Industrial
- Length: 43:47
- Label: Yeaah!

The First Annual Report is a bootleg album of music recorded by industrial music pioneers Throbbing Gristle in 1976. The recording originally went unreleased, and the band instead decided to release The Second Annual Report in 1977. This recording was first released unofficially in 1987 as Very Friendly through Spurt Records, before being issued prominently as The First Annual Report in 2001.

== Background ==
Throbbing Gristle's first album was recorded in 1976 but went unreleased. Instead, the band opted to release The Second Annual Report. According to AllMusic, "this legendary recording [...] reached an almost mythical status in the industrial music scene until its belated issue in 2001" as The First Annual Report.

== Release history ==
The recording has been bootlegged several times, released under titles such as Very Friendly and Final Muzak. Its most notable release came in 2001 as The First Annual Report, released in the UK through Yeaah! Records and in the US through Thirsty Ear.

== Critical reception and legacy ==
Professional ratings
Review scores
Source	Rating
AllMusic	4/5 stars
Pitchfork	7.5/10

AllMusic editor Martin Walters called the album "a milestone in subversive music matched only by Lou Reed's Metal Machine Music". Walters also described it as "undeniably the most important advent in the roots of industrial music. [...] Practically every act within industrial music and its offshoots – be it Merzbow, Whitehouse, Ministry, Big Black or Godflesh – owes an incredible debt to the groundbreaking music of Throbbing Gristle." Pitchfork praised the album's originality, but gave it a low grade in terms of listenability. Pitchfork also commented that "This record is essentially the birth of industrial music, packed with samples, abrasive, irregular beats, manipulated loops and Cosey Fanni Tutti's often unrecognizable guitar. Nurse with Wound, Cabaret Voltaire, Einstürzende Neubauten, Skinny Puppy, Controlled Bleeding and Acid Bath are just a few of the outfits that owe a huge debt to Throbbing Gristle's unrelenting assault."

== Track listing ==
No.	Title	Length
1.	"Very Friendly"	18:13
2.	"Dead Bait"	3:23
3.	"10 Pence"	5:10
4.	"Whorle of Sound"	4:55
5.	"Final Muzak"	5:29
6.	"Scars of E"	6:23
Total length:		43:47
