= Part Two (Throbbing Gristle album) =

2007 album by Throbbing Gristle

Part Two: The Endless Not

Studio album by Throbbing Gristle
- Released: 2 April 2007
- Recorded: 2004–2005
- Genre: Industrial
- Length: 67:25
- Label: Mute
- Producer: Throbbing Gristle

Throbbing Gristle chronology
Live December 2004 A Souvenir of Camber Sands (2004)	Part Two: The Endless Not (2007)	The Desertshore Installation (2007)

Part Two (also known as Part Two: The Endless Not) is the eighth studio album by English industrial band Throbbing Gristle, released in 2007 through record label Mute Records.

== Background ==
In a similar vein to the band's 1978 album D.o.A: The Third and Final Report, the album features four tracks each created by each individual member of the group. Bryin Dall was the co-writer and performer on the track by Genesis P-Orridge. The cover image is a picture of Mount Kailash taken by Martin Gray.

== Release ==
Part Two: The Endless Not was released in 2007 through record label Mute Records. Included with the first 4000 copies is one of four "totemic gifts", each made from one of the following materials: bone, wood, rubber and copper. A fifth stainless steel totem was made available in a Japanese edition of the CD. A sixth totemic gift is made of 23 carat gold. The gifts were handmade under the supervision of Peter Christopherson in Thailand.

== Critical reception ==
Professional ratings
Aggregate scores
Source	Rating
Metacritic	71/100
Review scores
Source	Rating
AllMusic	2.5/5 stars
The Guardian	3/5 stars
Pitchfork	8.5/10
PopMatters	8/10
Stylus Magazine	B
Tiny Mix Tapes	4.5/5 marks
Uncut	4/5 stars

Part Two: The Endless Not was generally well received by critics.

Pitchfork wrote, "The Endless Not features some of the subtlest songwriting of TG's career, playing that knot of tension for all its worth and all the more disturbing for how pensive and restrained it feels". PopMatters wrote that the album "sounds like a core of musicians who have rediscovered whatever spark it was that led them to create the entity that they are now so often defined by". Tiny Mix Tapes called the album "more of a rebirthing than a reunion".

On the other hand, AllMusic panned the album, calling it "ridiculous".

== Track listing ==
All lyrics are written by Genesis P-Orridge; all music is composed by Throbbing Gristle (P-Orridge, Cosey Fanni Tutti, Peter Christopherson and Chris Carter), except as noted.

No.	Title	Writer(s)	Length
1.	"Vow of Silence"		7:02
2.	"Rabbit Snare"		8:55
3.	"Separated"	Carter	4:51
4.	"Almost a Kiss"		6:47
5.	"Greasy Spoon"		9:31
6.	"Lyre Liar"		7:51
7.	"Above the Below"	Tutti	4:28
8.	"Endless Not"		8:01
9.	"The Worm Waits Its Turn"	P-Orridge, Bryin Dall	5:50
10.	"After the Fall"	Christopherson	4:05
Total length:			67:25

== Personnel ==
Throbbing Gristle

- Genesis P-Orridge – vocals, bass guitar, violin
- Cosey Fanni Tutti – lead guitar, cornet, samples
- Peter Christopherson – sleeve design and art direction, samples
- Chris Carter – production, audio mastering, programming, synthesizer

Technical

- Martin Gray – album cover photograph
