= Industrial Records =

British record label

- Founded: 1976
- Distributor: Mute Records
- Genre: Industrial music
- Country of origin: UK

Industrial Records is a record label established in 1976 by industrial music and visual arts group Throbbing Gristle. The group created the label primarily for self-releases but also signed several other groups and artists. The label gave a name to the industrial music genre.

== Background ==
Artists released through the label included Cabaret Voltaire, Clock DVA, SPK, Thomas Leer and Robert Rental, The Leather Nun, plus outrage artist Monte Cazazza, the author William S. Burroughs' auditory works, and a solo album by Throbbing Gristle member Chris Carter.

A notable departure from the industrial form of the label was the blues standard "Stormy Weather" sung by Elisabeth Welch, taken from the soundtrack of Derek Jarman's film The Tempest.

The label's first LP was Throbbing Gristle's debut LP The Second Annual Report, which was limited to 786 copies. It came in bootleg-like packaging: a plain white card sleeve with glued-on xerox information strips.

The Industrial Records logo is a stark black and white depiction a low-definition photo of an Auschwitz crematory.

In 2011, the label had an official "re-activation" as Throbbing Gristle's contract with Mute Records had expired. Since the band has permanently disbanded following the death of Sleazy, the label's plan is to re-release the original Throbbing Gristle albums (The Second Annual Report, D.o.A: The Third and Final Report, 20 Jazz Funk Greats, Heathen Earth, and Greatest Hits) on the label. Originally intended to be released all at once on 26 September 2011, the label had to delay due to a Sony DADC warehouse fire in London. The new plan was to release a new album chronologically once every week starting on Halloween 2011 with The Second Annual Report and ending 28 November with Throbbing Gristle's Greatest Hits.

There has been no comment on releasing any other artists' works or new content after the Throbbing Gristle releases.

== Discography ==
- IR 0002 - Throbbing Gristle - The Second Annual Report (LP)
- IR 0003 - Throbbing Gristle - United/Zyklon B Zombie (7")
- IR 0004 - Throbbing Gristle - D.o.A: The Third and Final Report (LP)
- IR 0005 - Monte Cazazza - To Mom on Mother's Day (7")
- IR 0006 - The Leather Nun - Slow Death EP (7")
- IR 0007 - Thomas Leer & Robert Rental - The Bridge (LP)
- IR 0008 - Throbbing Gristle - 20 Jazz Funk Greats (LP)
- IR 0009 - Throbbing Gristle - Heathen Earth (LP)
- IR 0010 - Monte Cazazza - Something For Nobody (7")
- IR 0011 - Surgical Penis Klinik - Meat Processing Section (7")
- IR 0012 - Elisabeth Welch - Stormy Weather (7")
- IR 0013 - Throbbing Gristle - Subhuman/Something Came Over Me (7")
- IR 0014 - Dorothy - I Confess (7")
- IR 0015 - Throbbing Gristle - Adrenalin/Distant Dreams (Part Two) (7")
- IR 0016 - William S. Burroughs - Nothing Here Now But The Recordings (LP)
- IRC 00 - Throbbing Gristle - Best Of.... Volume I (Cass)
- IRC 01 - Throbbing Gristle - Best Of.... Volume II (Cass)
- IRC 02 - Throbbing Gristle - At the ICA London (Cass)
- IRC 04 - Throbbing Gristle - At the Nag's Head, High Wycombe (Cass)
- IRC 05 - Throbbing Gristle - At the Brighton Polytechnic (Cass)
- IRC 06 - Throbbing Gristle - At Nuffield Theatre, Southampton (Cass)
- IRC 07 - Throbbing Gristle - At the Rat Club (Cass)
- IRC 08 - Throbbing Gristle - At the Highbury Roundhouse (Cass)
- IRC 09 - Throbbing Gristle - At the Art School Winchester (Cass)
- IRC 10 - Throbbing Gristle - At the Rat Club The Valentino Rooms (Cass)
- IRC 11 - Throbbing Gristle - At the Brighton Polytechnic (Cass)
- IRC 12 - Throbbing Gristle - At the Architectural Association (Cass)
- IRC 13 - Throbbing Gristle - At Goldsmith's College (Cass)
- IRC 14 - Throbbing Gristle - At the Industrial Training College (Cass)
- IRC 15 - Throbbing Gristle - At the London Film Makers Co-Op (Cass)
- IRC 16 - Throbbing Gristle - At the Crypt Club (Cass)
- IRC 17 - Throbbing Gristle - At Centro Iberico (Cass)
- IRC 18 - Throbbing Gristle - At Ajanta Cinema (Cass)
- IRC 19 - Throbbing Gristle - At Now Society (Cass)
- IRC 20 - Throbbing Gristle - At the Factory (Cass)
- IRC 21 - Throbbing Gristle - At Guild Hall (Cass)
- IRC 22 - Throbbing Gristle - At The Y.M.C.A. (Cass)
- IRC 23 - Throbbing Gristle - Pastimes/Industrial Muzak (Cass)
- IRC 24 - Throbbing Gristle - At Butlers Wharf (Cass)
- IRC 25 - Throbbing Gristle - At Leeds Fan Club (Cass)
- IRC 26 - Throbbing Gristle - At Scala Cinema (Cass)
- IRC 27 - The Leather Nun - At Scala Cinema, London/Music Palais Kungsgatan (Cass)
- IRC 28 - Monte Cazazza - At Leeds Fan Club/Scala, London/Oundle School (Cass)
- IRC 29 - Throbbing Gristle - At Goldsmiths College (Cass)
- IRC 30 - Throbbing Gristle - At Oundle Public School (Cass)
- IRC 31 - Clock DVA - White Souls In Black Suits (Cass)
- IRC 32 - Chris Carter - The Space Between (Cass)
- IRC 33 - Throbbing Gristle - At Sheffield University (Cass)
- IRC 34 - Richard H. Kirk - Disposable Half-Truths (Cass)
- IRC 35 - Cabaret Voltaire - 1974 - 1976 (Cass)
- (none) - Throbbing Gristle - The Taste of TG (CD)
- (none) - Throbbing Gristle - TG Now (CD)
- (none) - Throbbing Gristle - Live December 2004 A Souvenir of Camber Sands (2xCDr)
- IR 2009/4 - Throbbing Gristle - The Third Mind Movements (CD)
