= Subhuman/Something Came Over Me =

1980 single by Throbbing Gristle

Single by Throbbing Gristle
- Released: 23 October 1980
- Recorded: 1980
- Genre: Industrial
- Length: 6:36
- Label: Industrial Records
- Producer(s): Throbbing Gristle

Throbbing Gristle singles chronology
| "We Hate You (Little Girls)/Five Knuckle Shuffle" (1979) | "Subhuman/Something Came Over Me" (1980) | "Adrenalin/Distant Dreams (Part Two)" (1980) |

Additional cover

Subhuman/Something Came Over Me is a single by Throbbing Gristle.

The single was simultaneously released with Adrenalin/Distant Dreams (Part Two). Like most of TG's artwork, the Center labels featured distinct insignia typical of the band, with no "Death Factory" logo like other singles. The Message "White Stains" was scratched into the B-side. The cover sleeve is a black and white reproduction of "The Apotheosis of War" by Vasili Vasilyevich Vereshchagin.

== Track listing ==
Side A:

1. "Subhuman" – 2:53

Side B:

1. "Something Came Over Me" – 3:43

== Charts ==
| Chart (1980) | Peak position |
|---|---|
| UK Indie Chart | 23 |
