= TGV (box set) =

Box set by Throbbing Gristle
- Released: 2007
- Genre: Industrial

Throbbing Gristle chronology
| The Desertshore Installation (2007) | TGV (2007) | Thirty-Second Annual Report (2008) |

TGV is a limited edition 7 DVD set of archival footage of the English industrial band Throbbing Gristle. Included in this set were some of Throbbing Gristle's live performances, as well as rehearsals and short films. The release was limited to 2,000 copies and was initially only available direct from the band's website, but later some sellers were offering it online.

== Contents ==
From 1979–81 shows at:

- Oundle School
- Recording Heathen Earth at the Industrial Records Studios, Martello St. London
- Sheffield University
- Rafters Club, Manchester
- The Lyceum, London
- Kezar Pavilion, San Francisco

From 2004–05:

- A short film of the Cabinet Gallery Exhibition "TG24" by Andrew Wheatley
- Rare footage of TG rehearsing at Mute Studios in February 2004.
- The band's performance at the Astoria Theatre 2004
- All Tomorrow’s Parties performance at Camber Sands 2004
- Both performances from Turin, Italy 2005

Also:

- Derek Jarman’s famous short film made as a tribute to TG: "Psychic Rally in Heaven" London
- A full colour 60-page book with TG photos and texts from 1979 to 2005
