= CD1 (album) =

1986 album by Throbbing Gristle

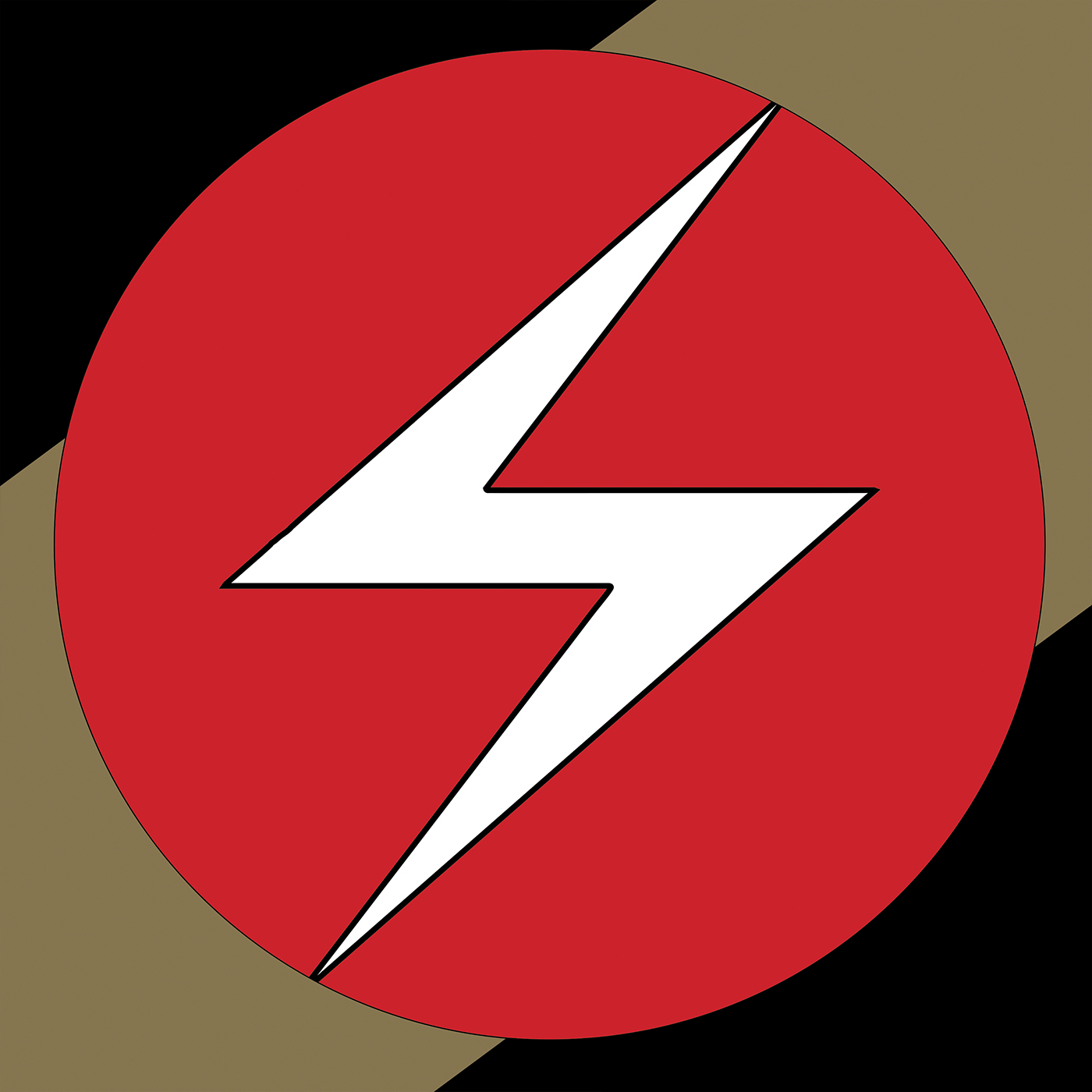
- iTunes cover

Studio album by Throbbing Gristle
- Released: 1986
- Recorded: 18 March 1979 at Industrial Records Studio, Hackney, England
- Genre: Industrial
- Length: 42:13
- Label: Mute

Throbbing Gristle chronology
| Sacrifice (1986) | CD1 (1986) | TG Live, Vol 1 1976-78 (1993) |

Cd1 is the sixth studio album by English industrial band Throbbing Gristle, also referred to as CD1, was released in 1986 through record label Mute.

== Background ==
The album is their first CD release and has a catalog number of "CD1", hence the adoption of the name. The album has been called "undoubtedly [...] in part responsible for the growing importance of the industrial scene in the late 1980s." The album is a TEAC 8-track recording done on 18 March 1979 at the band's Industrial Records Studio in Hackney, London.

== Release ==
CD1 was released in 1986 through record label Mute. It contained sleeve notes written individually by every band member. After being long out-of-print, the album was reissued by Mute in 2024, on vinyl, CD and digitally.

== Critical reception ==
Spin Alternative Record Guide called it "an album of meandering studio experiments". After the 2024 reissue by Mute, Jesse Dorris reviewed the album for Pitchfork, calling it "a dangerous séance" that involves noise and grinding grooves, and gave it a rating of 8/10.

== Track listing ==
| No. | Title | Length |
|---|---|---|
| 1. | "CD1" | 42:13 |
