= Mission of Dead Souls =

1981 live album by Throbbing Gristle

Live album by Throbbing Gristle
- Released: 1981
- Recorded: 29 May 1981
- Genre: Industrial
- Length: 62:45
- Label: Mute

Throbbing Gristle chronology
Heathen Earth (1980)	Mission of Dead Souls (1981)	Funeral in Berlin (1981)

Professional ratings
Review scores
Source	Rating
AllMusic	3/5 stars

Mission of Dead Souls is a recording of the final performance of Throbbing Gristle before their initial breakup. The concert took place at the Kezar Pavilion in Golden Gate Park in San Francisco on the evening of May 29th, 1981.

The album was originally released as part of the Fetish box set, consisting of four old albums and this album that was exclusive to the box, but when Mute Records picked up the Throbbing Gristle catalogue, this was one of the albums that was picked up, making this one of the most common Throbbing Gristle albums.

An official Betamax and VHS of this performance was recorded and released by Target Video on in the US on NTSC format in 1983. This was later issued on DVD in the TGV box set.

== Track listing ==
1. "Dead Souls" – 5:04
2. "Guts on the Floor" – 6:04
3. "Circle of Animals" – 5:26
4. "Looking for the OTO" – 5:05
5. "Vision and Voice" – 7:11
6. "Funeral Rites" – 5:20
7. "Spirits Flying" – 8:16
8. "Persuasion U.S.A." – 7:26
9. "The Process" – 0:39
10. "Discipline (reprise)" – 3:01
11. "Distant Dreams (Part Two)" – 5:30
12. "Something Came Over Me" – 3:43
- The last two songs are CD exclusive and were not included on 12" pressings nor on any of the 2018 reissues. They are studio recordings and were originally released on singles.
- The version of "Discipline" here is shortened from over nine minutes.
