= Genesis P-Orridge =

English artist and musician (1950–2020)

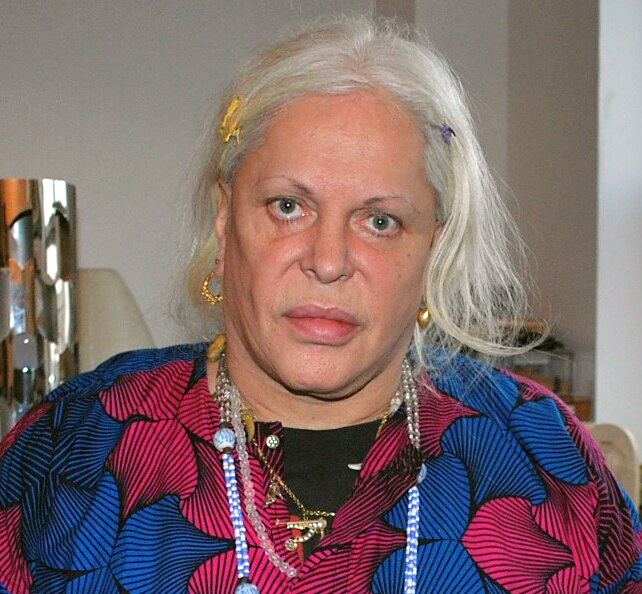
- P-Orridge in 2014
- Born: Neil Andrew Megson; 22 February 1950; Manchester, England
- Died: 14 March 2020 (aged 70); New York City, US
- Other names: Genesis Breyer P-Orridge, DJ Doktor Megatrip, Megs'on, P. Ornot, PT001, Vernon Castle
- Occupations: Singer-songwriter, musician, poet, writer, performance artist
- Years active: 1965–2020
- Spouses: Paula Brooking (m. 1981; div. 1992) Jacqueline Breyer (m. 1995; died 2007)
- Children: 2
- Musical career
- Genres: Experimental, industrial, avant-garde, electronic, psychedelic
- Instruments: Vocals, bass guitar, violin
- Labels: Industrial, Temple Records, Wax Trax!
- Website: www.genesisporridge.com

Genesis Breyer P-Orridge (born Neil Andrew Megson; 22 February 1950 – 14 March 2020) was an English singer-songwriter, musician, poet, performance artist, visual artist, and occultist who rose to prominence as the founder of the COUM Transmissions artistic collective and lead vocalist of seminal industrial band Throbbing Gristle. They were also a founding member of Thee Temple ov Psychick Youth (TOPY), an occult group, and fronted the experimental pop rock band Psychic TV.

Born in Manchester, P-Orridge developed an early interest in art, occultism, and the avant-garde while at Solihull School. After dropping out of studies at the University of Hull, they moved into a counter-cultural commune in London and adopted Genesis P-Orridge as their pseudonym. On returning to Hull, they founded COUM Transmissions with Cosey Fanni Tutti, and in 1973 they relocated to London. COUM's confrontational performance work, dealing with such subjects as sex work, pornography, serial killers, and occultism, represented a concerted attempt to challenge societal norms and attracted the attention of the national press. COUM's 1976 Prostitution show at London's Institute of Contemporary Arts was particularly vilified by tabloids, gaining them the moniker of the "wreckers of civilisation." P-Orridge's band, Throbbing Gristle, grew out of COUM, and were active from 1975 to 1981 as pioneers in the industrial music genre. In 1981, P-Orridge co-founded Psychic TV, an experimental band that from 1988 onward came under the increasing influence of acid house.

In 1981, P-Orridge co-founded Thee Temple ov Psychick Youth, an informal occult order influenced by chaos magic and experimental music. P-Orridge was seen as the group's leader, but rejected that position, and left the group in 1991. Amid the Satanic ritual abuse hysteria, a 1992 Channel 4 documentary accused P-Orridge of sexually abusing children, resulting in a police investigation. P-Orridge was subsequently cleared and Channel 4 retracted their allegation. As a result of the incident, P-Orridge left the United Kingdom for the United States and settled in New York City. There, they married Jacqueline Breyer, later known as Lady Jaye, in 1995, and together they embarked on the Pandrogeny Project, an attempt to unite as a "pandrogyne", or single entity, through the use of surgical body modification to physically resemble one another. P-Orridge continued with this project of body modification after Lady Jaye's 2007 death. Although involved in reunions of both Throbbing Gristle and Psychic TV in the 2000s, they retired from music to focus on other artistic media in 2009.

P-Orridge was credited on over 200 releases during their lifetime. They were cited as an icon within the avant-garde art scene, accrued a cult following, and had been given the moniker of the "Godparent of Industrial Music". P-Orridge considered themself third-gender and used various gender-neutral pronouns. (Note: P-Orridge used a variety of pronouns throughout their life; including first-person plural, and the neopronouns "s/he", "h/er", and "h/erself".)

== Early life ==
=== 1950–1964: Childhood ===
Genesis P-Orridge was born on 22 February 1950 in Victoria Park, Manchester, to Ronald and Muriel Megson. Ronald was a travelling salesman who had worked in repertory theatre and who played the drums in local jazz and dance bands. Muriel was from Salford and had first met Ronald after he returned to England after being injured with the British Army at the Battle of Dunkirk in 1940. As a child, they had a good relationship with their parents, who did not interfere with their artistic interests.

Due to Ronald's job, the family moved to Essex, where they attended Staples Road Infant School in Loughton, and for a time lived in a caravan near to Epping Forest while the family house was being completed. The family then moved from Essex to Cheshire, where they attended Gatley Primary School. Passing the 11-plus exam, they won a scholarship to attend Stockport Grammar School, doing so between 1961 and 1964.

=== 1964–1968: Solihull School and Worm ===
After their father became the Midlands area manager of a cleaning and maintenance business, they were sent to the privately run Solihull School in Warwickshire between 1964 and 1968; a period they would refer to as "basically four years of being mentally and physically tortured", but also a time when they developed an interest in art, occultism and the avant-garde. At age fifteen, they became a fan of "The Hundred Headless Woman," a book that contained surrealist collages by various artists, including Max Ernst. The book became an early source of inspiration, and it was at that time that they took on the name "P-Orridge."

Unpopular with other pupils, they were bullied at the school, finding comfort in the art department at lunch-time and in the evenings. They befriended Ian "Spydeee" Evetts, Barry "Little Baz" Hermon and Paul Wolfson, three fellow pupils who shared their interest in art, literature, and poetry. They regularly discussed books and music, developing an interest in the writings of Aleister Crowley, William S. Burroughs, Jack Kerouac and Allen Ginsberg and the music of Frank Zappa, the Fugs and the Velvet Underground. They became interested in occultism, and also asserted that their grandmother was a medium.

In 1967, P-Orridge founded their first collective, Worm, with school friends Pingle Wad (Peter Winstanley), Spydeee Gasmantell (Ian Evetts) and P-Orridge's girlfriend Jane Ray. Worm was influenced by AMM and John Cage's 1961 book Silence: Lectures and Writings. In 1966, P-Orridge, Evetts, Hermon, Wolfson, and Winstanley began production of an underground magazine, entitled Conscience. Forbidden from selling it on school grounds, they sold copies outside the school gates. Included in Conscience were various articles criticising the school's administration, leading to proposed changes regarding such issues as school uniforms and prefects (known as benchers) privileges. That same year, influenced by newspaper accounts of "Swinging London", they organised the first happening at the school, doing so under the auspices of organising a school dance.

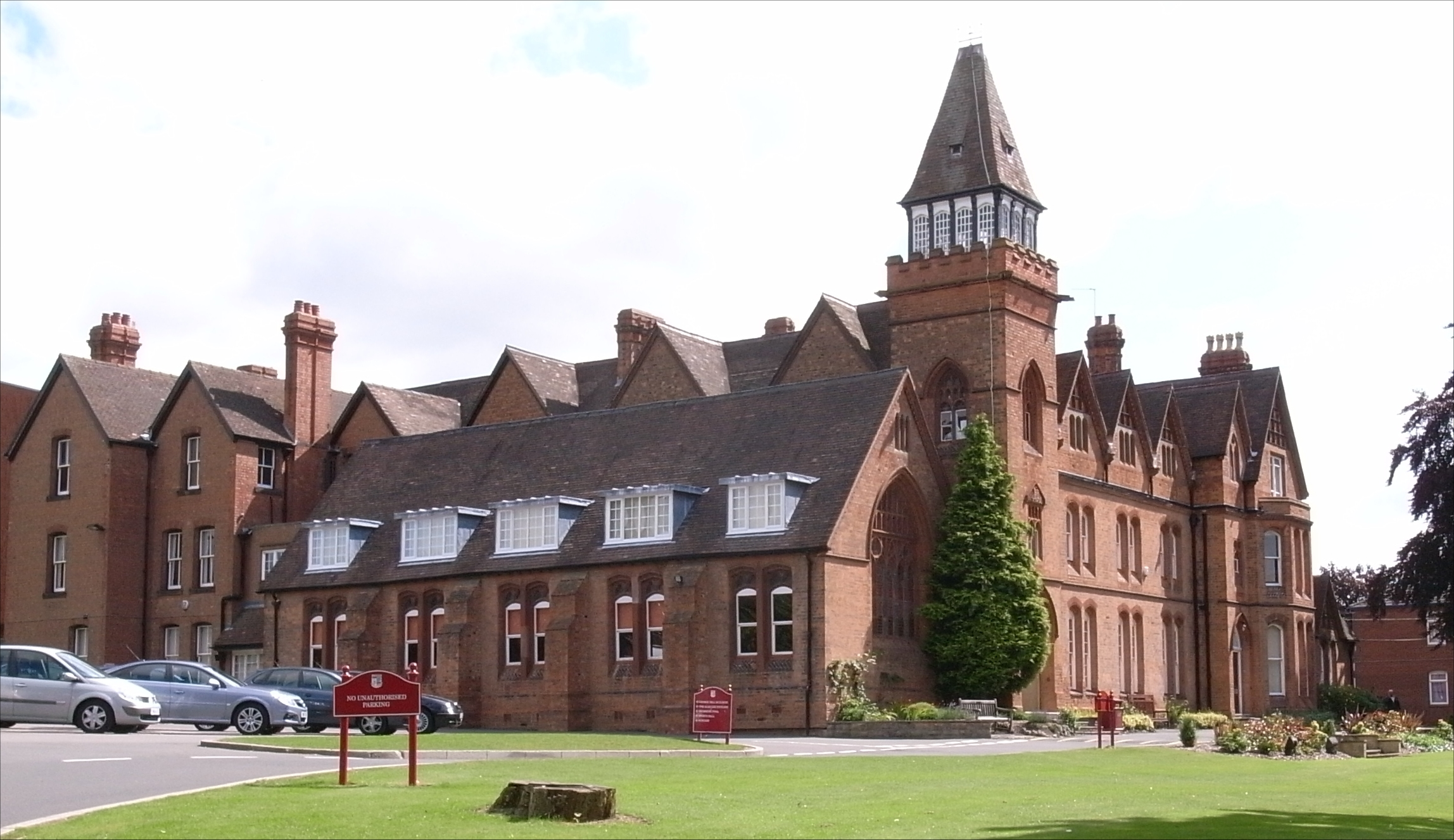
Solihull School, which P-Orridge attended in the mid-1960s

Brought up in the Anglican denomination of Christianity, P-Orridge became secretary of the school sixth form's Christian Discussion Circle, in this position inviting members of other ideological positions – including a Marxist from the British Communist Party – to speak to the group. Aged 18, P-Orridge began helping to run the local Sunday school classes, but came to reject organised Christianity. Afflicted with asthma throughout childhood, P-Orridge had to take cortisone and prednisone steroids to control the attacks. The latter of these drugs caused their adrenal glands to atrophy as a side-effect, and so the doctor advised P-Orridge to stop taking them. As a result, aged 17, P-Orridge suffered from a serious blackout; while in hospital recovering they decided to devote their life to art and writing.

With Hermon and Wolfson, P-Orridge founded a group called the Knights of the Pentecostal Flame. The Knights undertook a happening on 1 June 1968 which they titled Beautiful Litter. Taking place in Mell Square, Solihull, it involved the three students handing out cards to passersby that had a series of words written onto them; "fleece", "rainbow", "silken", "white", "flower" and "dewdrops". Ensuring that the local Solihull News was informed of the event, P-Orridge told reporters that the Knights wanted to ignite "an artistic revolution in Solihull, by making people aware of the life around them, its essential beauty and tranquillity." In mid-1968, Worm recorded their first and only album, entitled Early Worm, in P-Orridge's parents' attic in Solihull. It was pressed onto vinyl in November at Deroy Sound Services in Manchester, but only one copy was ever produced. A second album, Catching the Bird, was recorded but never pressed.

=== 1968–1969: Hull University and Transmedia Explorations ===
In September 1968, P-Orridge began studying for a degree in Social Administration and Philosophy at the University of Hull. Hull was chosen in an attempt to study at "the most ordinary non-elitist, working-class, red brick university", but P-Orridge disliked the course and unsuccessfully tried to transfer to study English. With a group of friends, P-Orridge founded a 'free-form' student magazine entitled Worm which waived all editorial control, publishing everything placed into the magazine's pigeonhole, including instructions on how to build a molotov cocktail. Three issues were published between 1968 and 1970 before the Hull Student's Union banned the publication, considering it legally obscene and fearing prosecution. Developing a keen interest in poetry, P-Orridge won the 1969 Hull University Needler Poetry Competition, judged by Compton lecturer Richard Murphy and the poet Philip Larkin, who was then librarian at the university. P-Orridge became involved in radical student politics through their friendship with Tom Fawthrop, a member of the Radical Student Alliance who had led a student occupation of the university's administrative buildings as a part of the worldwide student protests of 1968. In 1969, P-Orridge attempted to reconstruct the occupation for a film, in the hopes that it would itself become a genuine protest occupation, but this venture failed due to a lack of participants.

In 1969, P-Orridge dropped out of university and moved to London, and joined the Transmedia Explorations commune, who were then living in a large run-down house in Islington Park Street. The group, initiated by the artist David Medalla and initially named the Exploding Galaxy, had been at the forefront of the London hippy scene since 1967, but had partially disbanded after a series of police raids and a damaging court case. Moving into their commune, P-Orridge was particularly influenced by one of the founding members of the group, Gerald Fitzgerald, a kinetic artist, and would recognise Fitzgerald's formative influence in P-Orridge's later work. The commune members adhered to a strict regime with the intention of deconditioning its members out of their routines and conventional behaviour; they were forbidden from sleeping in the same place on consecutive nights, food was cooked at irregular times of the day and all clothing was kept in a communal chest, with its members wearing something different on each day. P-Orridge stayed there for three months, until late October 1969. They left after becoming angered that the commune's leaders were given more rights than the other members and believing that the group ignored the counter-cultural use of music, something they took a great interest in. Julie Wilson later stated that although P-Orridge's time at the Transmedia Explorations commune had been brief, "the experiences (they) had there proved to be seminal" to their artistic development.

== COUM Transmissions ==
=== 1969–1970: Founding COUM Transmissions ===
Leaving London, P-Orridge hitch-hiked across Britain before settling down in a new home in Shrewsbury. Here, they volunteered as an office clerk in Ronald Megson's new business. On one family trip to Wales, P-Orridge was sitting in the back of the car, then "became disembodied and heard voices and saw the COUM symbol and heard the words 'COUM Transmissions'". Returning home that evening, P-Orridge filled three notebooks with artistic thoughts and ideas, influenced by the time spent at Transmedia Explorations.

In November 1969, P-Orridge returned to Hull to meet up with friend John Shapeero, who partnered with P-Orridge to turn COUM Transmissions into an avant-garde artistic and musical troupe. They initially debated as to how to define "COUM", later deciding that like the name "dada" it should remain open to interpretation. P-Orridge designed a logo for the group, consisting of a semi-erect penis formed out of the word COUM with a drip of semen coming out of the end, while the motto "Your Local Dirty Banned" (a pun on "band") was emblazoned underneath. Another logo designed by P-Orridge consisted of a hand-drawn seal accompanied by the statement "COUM guarantee disappointment"; from their early foundation, the group made use of wordplay in their artworks and adverts.

COUM's earliest public events were impromptu musical gigs performed at various pubs around Hull; titles for these events included Thee Fabulous Mutations, Space Between the Violins, Dead Violins and Degradation, and Clockwork Hot Spoiled Acid Test. The latter combined the names of Anthony Burgess' dystopian science-fiction novel A Clockwork Orange (1962) with Tom Wolfe's The Electric Kool-Aid Acid Test (1968), a work of literary journalism devoted to the Merry Pranksters, a US communal counter-cultural group who advocated the use of psychedelic drugs. COUM's music was anarchic and improvised, making use of such instruments as broken violins, prepared pianos, guitars, bongos and talking drums. As time went on, they added further theatrics to their performances, in one instance making the audience crawl through a polythene tunnel to enter the venue.

In December 1969, P-Orridge and Shapeero moved out of their flat and into a former fruit warehouse in Hull's docking area, overlooking the Humber. Named the Ho-Ho Funhouse by P-Orridge, the warehouse became the communal home to an assortment of counter-cultural figures, including artists, musicians, fashion designers and underground magazine producers. At Christmas 1969, a woman named Christine Carol Newby moved into the Funhouse after being thrown out of her home by her father. Having earlier befriended them at an acid test party, Newby became P-Orridge's roommate at the Funhouse, first taking the name Cosmosis, but latterly adopting the stage name Cosey Fanni Tutti after the title of Amadeus Mozart's 1790 opera Così fan tutte. Joining COUM, Tutti initially helped in building props and designing costumes, and was there when the group began including performance art and more theatrical happenings in its music events; Evetts, aka Spydeee Gasmantell, after being expelled from Solihull School joined COUM. The three of them lived in a derelict Georgian warehouse in Prince Street, Hull. An example performance involved the group turning up to play a gig but intentionally not bringing any instruments, something P-Orridge considered "much more theatrical, farcical and light-hearted" than their earlier performances.

=== 1971–1973: Activities in Hull ===
On 5 January 1971, P-Orridge underwent a legal name change to Genesis P-Orridge by deed poll, combining the adopted nickname Genesis with an altered spelling of porridge, the foodstuff which they had lived off as a student. The new name was intentionally un-glamorous, and they hoped that it would trigger a personal "genius factor". In February, COUM caught the attention of The Yorkshire Post, which featured an article on them that led to further media attention from national newspapers. They also featured in an article in Torch, the publication of the University of Hull's student union, entitled "God Sucks Mary's Hairy Nipple"; the article's author, Haydn Robb (nowadays known as Haydn Nobb), subsequently joined COUM, as did maths lecturer Tim Poston. In April 1971, COUM, consisting of P-Orridge and Gasmantell, broadcast their first live radio session, for the On Cue programme for Radio Humberside. Following up the press attention they received, they performed further happenings, including their first street action, Absolute Everywhere, which brought problems with the police.

After performing another set, Riot Control, at Hull's Gondola Club, the premises were raided by police and closed soon after; most local clubs blamed COUM and unofficially banned them. COUM drew up a petition to gain support for the group, attaining a booking at the local Brickhouse; their first performance in which the audience applauded and called for an encore. The petition had contained their phallic logo, and the police charged P-Orridge and Robb with publishing an obscene advert, although the charges were later dropped. As they gained coverage in the music press, interest in the band grew, and they supported Hawkwind at St. George's Hall in Bradford in October 1971, where they performed a piece called Edna and the Great Surfers, where they led the crowd in shouting "Off, Off, Off". The following month, the band attracted the interest of music journalist John Peel, who publicly remarked that "[s]ome might say that Coum were madmen but constant exposure to mankind forces me to believe that we need more madmen like them."

Gaining an Experimental Arts Grant from the publicly funded Yorkshire Arts Association, COUM described themselves as performance artists, being inspired by the Dadaists and emphasising the amateur quality of their work. They entered the National Rock/Folk Contest at Hull's New Grange Club with a set titled This Machine Kills Music, and organised events for Hull City Council's celebrations to mark the UK's entry into the European Economic Community in 1973. They had also worked on solo projects, generating controversy in the local press over a conceptual artwork the artist entered at a local exhibition. Taking an increasing interest in infantilism, P-Orridge founded the fictitious L'ecole de l'art infantile and co-organised the "Baby's Coumpetition" [sic] at Oxford University's 1973 May Festival, also producing material as the fictitious Ministry of Antisocial Insecurity, a parody of the Ministry of Social Security. Meanwhile, P-Orridge created the character of Alien Brain, and in July 1972, performed as the character at an event entitled the World Premiere of the Alien Brain, at Hull Arts Centre. COUM also began publishing books; in 1972, they brought out the first volume of The Million and One Names of COUM, part of a proposed project to release 1001 slogans (such as "A thousand and one ways to COUM" and "COUM are Fab and Kinky"), while in 1973 P-Orridge published Copyright Breeches, which explored an ongoing personal fascination with the copyright symbol and its implications for art and society.

=== 1973–1975: London and growing fame ===
Following continual police harassment, P-Orridge and Tutti relocated to London, moving into a squat and obtaining a basement studio in Hackney which they named the "Death Factory". After a brief correspondence, P-Orridge met American novelist and poet William S. Burroughs. Brion Gysin would become a major influence upon P-Orridge's ideas and works and was the latter's primary tutor in spiritual magic. 1973 saw COUM take part in the Fluxshoe retrospective that toured Britain exhibiting the work of the Fluxus artists; it was organised by David Mayor, who befriended P-Orridge. At that year's Edinburgh Festival, P-Orridge undertook a Marcel Duchamp-inspired performance art piece, Art Vandals, at the Richard Demarco Gallery, engaging guests in unconventional conversation, and spilling their food and drink on the floor. Exhibiting alongside the Viennese Actionists, P-Orridge came under increasing influence from these Austrian performance artists, adopting their emphasis on using shock tactics to combat conventional morality. P-Orridge's first film, Wundatrek Tours, was released in September 1973, and documented a day out to Brighton. Throughout the year the artist sent personally designed postcards to mail-art shows across the world.

"COUM enable all kinds of people to discover their abilities to express ideas through different media. COUM believe that you don't NEED special training to produce and/or enjoy, worthwhile, significant and unique works. COUM demonstrate that there are NO boundaries in any form. It has NOT all been done before, and that which has can still bear valid re-interpretation. Thee [sic] possibilities remain endless."

— COUM Manifesto, 1974

In January 1974, COUM returned their attention to music, collaborating with the Canadian artist Clive Robertson to produce Marcel Duchamp's Next Work, which they premiered at an arts festival in the Zwarte Zaal Royal Conservatory of Ghent in Ghent, Belgium. COUM's next major work was Couming of Age, performed in March 1974 at the Oval House in Kennington, South London. After the show, they were approached by an audience member, Peter Christopherson, who shared many of their interests; P-Orridge and Tutti nicknamed him "Sleazy" because of the former's particular interest in the sexual aspects of COUM's work. Christopherson began to aid them using their skills as a photographer and graphic designer, and would first perform with them in their March 1975 work Couming of Youth. In May 1974, COUM issued a manifesto published on an A3 double-sided sheet titled Decoumpositions and Events.

In April 1974, the Arts Council of Great Britain gave COUM the first half of a £1,500 grant. The money stabilised the group, which now included P-Orridge and Tutti as directors, John Gunni Busck as technical director, and Lelli Maull as musical director. During that year, they made use of various artist-run venues in London, most notably the Art Meeting Place (AMP) in Covent Garden, where they regularly performed during 1974. A number of these works entailed P-Orridge and Tutti exploring the gender balance, including concepts of gender confusion. In one performance at the AWB, which was titled Filth, P-Orridge and Tutti performed sexual acts using a double-ended dildo. COUM were frustrated with the restrictions imposed on them by the Arts Council as a prerequisite for receiving funding; rather than performing at Council-accredited venues, they wanted to perform more spontaneously. In August 1974 they carried out a spontaneous unauthorised piece of performance art in Brook Green, Hammersmith; during the performance, police arrived and put a stop to the event, deeming it obscene.

In September 1974, COUM were invited to attend the Stadfest in Rottweil, West Germany, and they proceeded with a travel grant from the British Council. There, they published two performance art actions in the street, earning them praise from Bridget Riley and Ernst Jandl, both of whom were present. The acclaim that COUM received at Rottweil established the group's reputation as "one of the most innovative performance art groups then on the London art scene", convincing the Arts Council and British Council to take them more seriously and offer them greater support.

"COUM is not 'about' entertainment, it is coumcerned [sic] with direct, symbolic interpretation of actions to realise a uniquely personal perception."

— P-Orridge, 1974

In February 1975, P-Orridge gained their first full-time job, working as an assistant editor at St. James Press, in which they helped to compile the Contemporary Artists reference book. The work meant that they had less time to devote to COUM but gained a wide range of contacts in the art world. During that year, COUM embarked on a series of five performance pieces which it termed Omissions; these were performed across Europe. In March 1975, COUM performed Couming of Youth at the Melkweg in Amsterdam. Adopting a more violent stance than their previous work – in this reflecting an influence from the Viennese Actionists – the performance involved self-mutilation, Cosey inserting lighted candles into her vagina, P-Orridge being crucified and whipped, and P-Orridge and Cosey having sexual intercourse. At Southampton's Nuffield Festival in July 1975, COUM performed Studio of Lust, where P-Orridge publicly masturbated and all of the members undressed and adopted sexual poses.

=== 1975–1976: Establishing Throbbing Gristle and the Prostitution show ===
COUM were introduced to Chris Carter in 1975 through their mutual friend John Lacey. Lacey believed that Carter would be interested in COUM as a result of his particular interest in the experimental use of light and sound. Together, Carter, Christopherson, Cosey and P-Orridge founded a musical band, Throbbing Gristle, on 3 September 1975; they had deliberately chosen that date for it was the 36th anniversary of the United Kingdom joining the Second World War. The term "throbbing gristle" was deliberately chosen for it was a Yorkshire slang term for an erect penis. Throbbing Gristle, or TG as it was widely known, was aimed at a wider audience than COUM, thereby aiming to work within popular culture rather than the elite realm of the art scene. COUM and TG were largely treated as distinct entities; the music press ignored COUM and saw TG as experimental art rock, while the arts press ignored TG, viewing COUM as performance artists. Despite their intention of operating within the realms of popular culture, TG never had chart success, and remained a cult band; their audience was far larger than COUM.

COUM continued to operate alongside TG, and in October 1975 they performed Jusquà la balle crystal at the Ninth Paris Biennale at the Musée d'art modern. The prestige of being invited to such an event led to the Arts Council awarding them a grant for £1,600, although only the first half of this was ever paid out. COUM's mail art had taken on an increasingly pornographic dimension, and in November 1975 the police charged P-Orridge with distributing obscene material via the postal system under the 1953 Post Office Act; this trial was set for February 1976. They were prosecuted in 1975 for making collages combining postcards of Queen Elizabeth with soft-core porn, but the jail term and fines were suspended on condition they did not continue.

Their Prostitution show, in 1976 at the Institute of Contemporary Arts (ICA) in London, included displays of Tutti's pornographic images from magazines as well as erotic nude photographs; the show featured a stripper, used tampons in glass, and transvestite guards. Prostitutes, punks, and people in costumes were among those hired to mingle with the gallery audience. The show caused debate in Parliament about the public funding of such events. In the House of Commons, Scottish Conservative MP Nicholas Fairbairn demanded an explanation from Arts Minister Harold Lever and proclaimed P-Orridge and Tutti as "wreckers of civilisation". Fleet Street was not slow to pick up the story. The reviews were cut up, framed, and put on display for the remainder of the exhibition. This was also reported in newspapers, so cut-ups about the cut-ups were also put on display. COUM was found so offensive that it lost its government grant, and went on to become the private company Industrial Records. Toward the end of COUM, performances would often consist of only P-Orridge, Cosey and Sleazy, the core group who went on to form Throbbing Gristle.

== Throbbing Gristle ==
Throbbing Gristle was formed in late 1975 as a four-piece band, consisting of P-Orridge, Cosey Fanni Tutti, Peter "Sleazy" Christopherson and Chris Carter. P-Orridge's involvement in Throbbing Gristle led to the artist being regularly cited as the "Godfather of Industrial Music", or in some later sources, "godparent".

The first Throbbing Gristle performance was held at the Air Gallery in London in July 1976. At that point, Throbbing Gristle's headquarters was located at 10 Martello Street, Hackney, East London, the address of an artist collective. P-Orridge and Tutti's living and work space was the postal address of Industrial Records (IR). TG came to be identified as the founders of industrial music, although at the same time the academic Drew Daniel asserted that as a result of its eclecticism, their music resists clear analysis.

Throbbing Gristle's best-selling single was "Zyklon B Zombie" (1978), the title being a reference to the Zyklon B poison gas used at Auschwitz extermination camp. With their album 20 Jazz Funk Greats they attempted to move away from their industrial sound, and produced songs in a variety of different musical genres. P-Orridge received a number of threatening phone calls, proceeding to record them and use them as a backing track for the TG song "Death Threats". Throbbing Gristle released "Discipline" in 1980.

The final IR release was called Nothing Here Now But the Recordings, a best-of album taken from the archives of William S. Burroughs, who provided P-Orridge and Christopherson with access to his reel-to-reel tape archive.

The final Throbbing Gristle live event, Mission of Dead Souls, occurred in May 1981 at the Kezar Pavilion in San Francisco. Shortly after the San Francisco event, P-Orridge and Paula Brooking were married.

During this period, P-Orridge befriended an English musician named David Bunting; P-Orridge already knew another man named David, so coined the moniker David Tibet, which Bunting adopted as a stage name. Through an introduction provided by Burroughs, P-Orridge met Brion Gysin in Paris, probably in 1980, coming to be deeply influenced by Gysin's cut-up method; P-Orridge understood this to be a revolutionary method of escaping current patterns of thought and developing something new.

== Psychic TV and Thee Temple Ov Psychic Youth ==
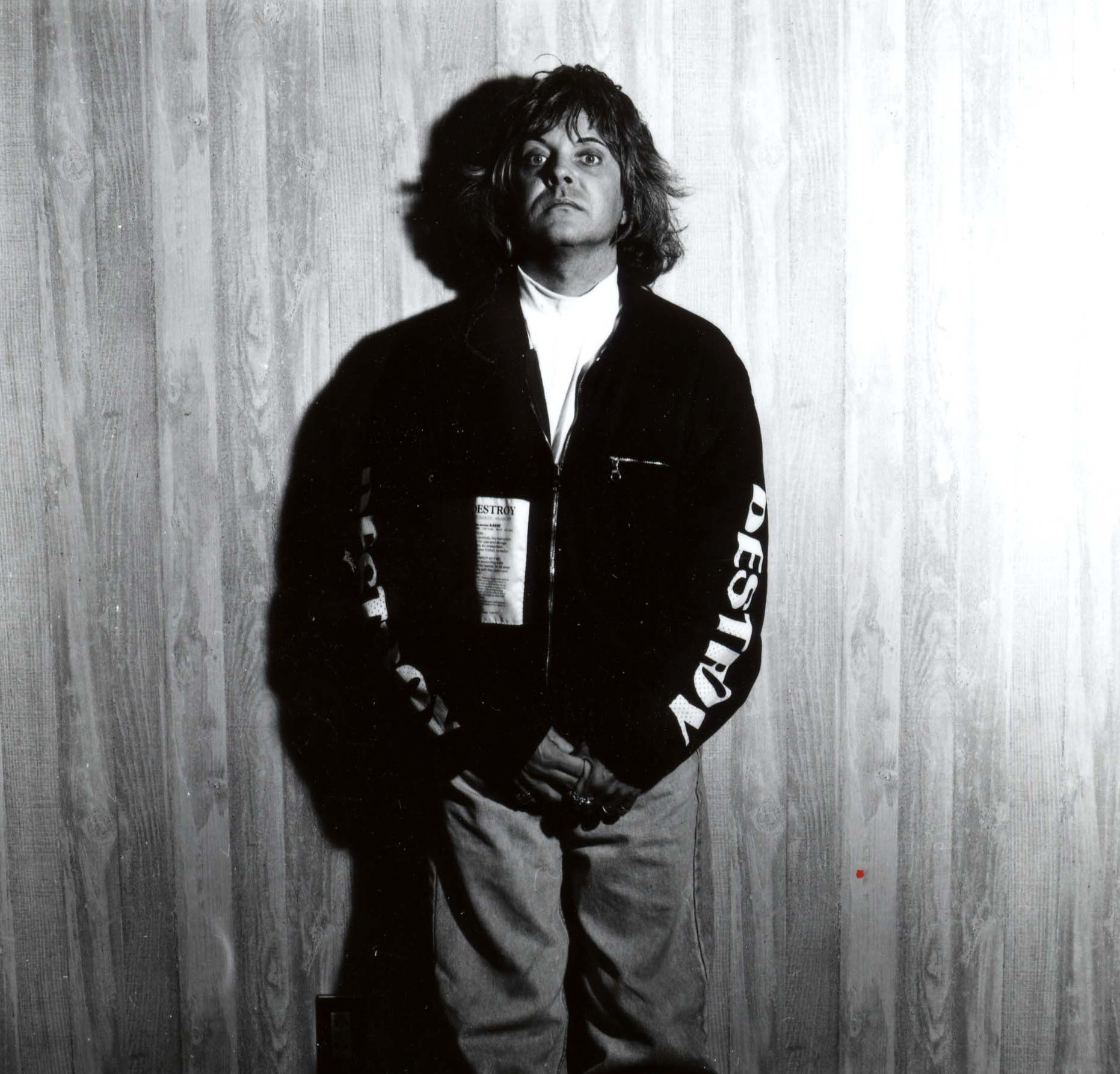
Genesis P-Orridge posing in Japan

Following the break-up of Throbbing Gristle, in 1981 P-Orridge founded a band with Peter Christopherson and Alex Fergusson that they named Psychic TV. Involved in video art, they also performed psychedelic, punk, electronic and experimental music. The decision to name the band "Psychic TV" stemmed from P-Orridge's belief that while mainstream television was a form of mass indoctrination and mind control, it could be used as an "esoterrorist" form of magick to combat the establishment's control. Historian Dave Evans described Psychic TV as "a band dedicated to musical eclecticism and magical experiment, their performances being in part ritual (ab)use of sound samples, the creation of 'auditory magical sigils' and the destruction of consensus language in order to find meaning".

The band's first song, "Just Drifting", was based on a poem by P-Orridge. For their first album, Force the Hand of Chance (1982), P-Orridge used a kangling, or Tibetan trumpet made out of a human thigh-bone; the instrument had been introduced to P-Orridge by David Tibet, and attracted attention to their music. P-Orridge had become acquainted with Anton LaVey, founder of the Church of Satan and ideologue of LaVeyan Satanism, with LaVey making an appearance on the Psychic TV song "Joy", in which he recites the Lord's Prayer backwards.

Psychic TV made its debut in 1982 at an event organised by P-Orridge, David Dawson, and Roger Ely, called The Final Academy. It was a 4-day multimedia celebratory rally held in Manchester and at the Ritzy Cinema in Brixton, South London. It brought performers and audience together with literature, performance, film and music. PTV, Cabaret Voltaire, 23 Skidoo, Z'EV, John Giorno, William S. Burroughs, Brion Gysin, Terry Wilson, Jeff Nuttall, and the Last Few Days participated to honour the cut-up techniques and theories of William S. Burroughs, Ian Sommerville, Antony Balch and Gysin. Video projection and early sampling were used here, as well as whispered utterances by P-Orridge reprocessed as a soundtrack to Gysin's Dreammachine by the Hafler Trio. In the mid-1980s, Psychic TV aimed to release a live album on the 23rd of each month for 23 months in recognition of the 23 enigma. The group did not reach its goal but still managed fourteen albums in eighteen months, thus earning them an entry in the Guinness Book of World Records. Following the culmination of Psychic TV but before embarking on Thee Majesty, P-Orridge and several Psychic TV musicians formed Splinter Test, a name adopted from one of P-Orridge's essays on sampling. From 1988, the band came under the increasing influence of the acid house genre of dance music, and were responsible for helping the popularisation of acid house music in Europe.

In 1981, P-Orridge also founded a loosely organised network of occultists named Thee Temple ov Psychick Youth (TOPY), with the aid of John Balance, Tibet, and a number of members of the Process Church of the Final Judgement, a group which had exerted an influence on P-Orridge's occult thought. TOPY was conceived not as an occult order of teaching, but a forum to facilitate discussions on occult ideas by like-minded people, and from its beginnings was understood by its founders to be a successor to the late 19th and early 20th century Ordo Templi Orientis (OTO), especially as the latter had been run under Crowley's leadership. Evans described TOPY as "a 'fusion' organisation, creating a crossover of punk/experimental music with chaos magical thinking and practice", making particular use of the sigilisation practices of occult artist Austin Osman Spare. Journalist Gavin Baddeley described TOPY as "perhaps the most influential new occult order of the 1980s". P-Orridge had never wanted to be seen as the leader of an occult order, although many of those involved in TOPY were frustrated that outsiders regularly described P-Orridge as the group's leader. Accordingly, P-Orridge separated from TOPY in 1991, which continued as a community after the departure.

Having been encouraged by groups involved in propagating the moral panic about alleged Satanic ritual abuse, the Channel 4 1992 documentary show Dispatches claimed to have discovered videotapes depicting P-Orridge sexually abusing children in a ritual setting. Police from the Obscene Publications Squad subsequently raided P-Orridge's home, and confiscated several tonnes of art work. At the time, P-Orridge was in Thailand undertaking famine relief work; fearing arrest and loss of child custody upon return to the UK, P-Orridge stayed out of the country for several years, settling in the United States. P-Orridge believed that the negative press and police attention were the result of a campaign organised by a Christian group. It was subsequently revealed that the footage obtained did not depict child abuse. Instead, it was a video artwork titled First Transmissions that had been made in the early 1980s, partially funded by Channel 4 itself; the footage depicted sex-magic rites between adults, bloodletting performances, and scenes of the filmmaker Derek Jarman reading passages from the work of Geoffrey Chaucer. Embarrassed by these revelations, Channel 4 retracted its initial accusations.

In 2016, the film director Jacqueline Castel began work on the feature-length documentary titled A Message from the Temple, about Thee Temple Ov Psychick Youth and P-Orridge.

50 Beck Road, the Orridges last family home in London

== Later life ==
=== 1993–2009: The Pandrogeny Project ===
At 45 years of age, P-Orridge met Lady Jaye (née Jacqueline Breyer) in a BDSM dungeon in New York City and would later marry. Jaye worked as a nurse during the daytime, providing care for children with terminal illnesses and disabilities. In the evenings, Lady Jaye worked as a dominatrix at the dungeon, and Genesis was a visiting customer. The night they met, the two visited Paddles, an underground BDSM club in Manhattan. The two then became a couple.

In January 1993, P-Orridge and Jaye moved to Ridgewood, Queens, in New York City. Here, they embarked on the "Pandrogeny Project"; influenced by the cut-up technique, the duo underwent body modification to resemble one another, thus coming to identify themselves as a single pandrogynous being named "Breyer P-Orridge". In doing so, the pair spent $200,000 on surgical alteration, receiving breast implants, cheek and chin implants, lip plumping, eye and nose jobs, tattooing, and hormone therapy, while also adopting gender neutral and alternating pronouns. With this project, P-Orridge's intent was to express a belief that the self is pure consciousness trapped within the DNA-governed body. The couple adopted the term "pandrogyne" because – in their words – "we wanted a word without any history or any connections with things – a word with its own story and its own information". They also stated that:

We started out, because we were so crazy in love, just wanting to eat each other up, to become each other and become one. And as we did that, we started to see that it was affecting us in ways that we didn't expect. Really, we were just two parts of one whole; the pandrogyne was the whole and we were each other's other half.

During this era, a book of P-Orridge's writings, poems, and observations titled Ooh, You Are Awful ... But I Like You! was published. In the mid-1990s, P-Orridge collaborated with different people in music, including Pigface, Skinny Puppy, and Download. P-Orridge also performed with Nik Turner and other former members of Hawkwind.

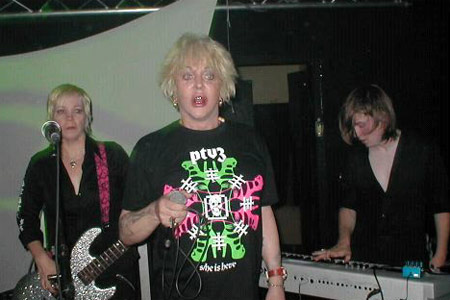
PTV3 live in Germany 2004: Alice Genese, G. P-Orridge, Markus Persson

In June 1998, P-Orridge won a $1.5 million lawsuit against producer Rick Rubin and his American Recordings label for injuries sustained while trying to escape a fire at Rubin's home in April 1995. According to P-Orridge's attorney, David D. Stein, P-Orridge was staying at Rubin's home, as a guest of Love and Rockets, when the fire broke out. P-Orridge tried to escape the house by crawling through a second-storey window and fell onto concrete stairs. P-Orridge suffered a broken wrist, broken ribs, and a pulmonary embolism, as well as a shattered left elbow that, according to Stein, prevented P-Orridge from playing bass or keyboards. They remained in hospital for ten days. The jury found that the liability for the fire rested with Rubin and American Recordings, and awarded P-Orridge US$1,572,000 in compensation.

In 1999, P-Orridge performed with the briefly reunited late-1980s version of Psychic TV for an event at London's Royal Festival Hall, called Time's Up. The MC for the event, via pre-recorded video, was Quentin Crisp, it was recorded and released as a DVD. Time's Up is also the title of the first CD by Thee Majesty, P-Orridge's spoken-word project with "noise" guitarist, Bryin Dall.

In December 2003, P-Orridge, using the alias Djinn, unveiled PTV3, a new act drawing upon the early "Hyperdelic" work of Psychic TV with media theorist Douglas Rushkoff among its members. On 16 May 2004, all four former members of Throbbing Gristle performed at the London Astoria for the first time in 23 years.

P-Orridge appeared in the 1998 film and 2000 book versions of Modulations, as well as appearing in the 1999 film Better Living Through Circuitry, the 2004 film DiG!, Bruce LaBruce's 2004 film The Raspberry Reich, the 2006 documentary Monks: The Transatlantic Feedback, in Nik Sheehan's 2007 feature documentary on the Dreamachine entitled FLicKeR, the 2010 documentary William S. Burroughs: A Man Within, and the 2011 film The Ballad of Genesis and Lady Jaye.

In January 2006, the new PTV album was announced on P-Orridge's website. Hell Is Invisible... Heaven Is Her/e was recorded in NYC and features Nick Zinner (Yeah Yeah Yeahs) and Gibby Haynes (Butthole Surfers) guesting on some tracks. To inaugurate the release of Hell Is Invisible ... Heaven Is Her/e, PTV3 hosted a five night residency in September 2006 at Galapagos Art Space in Williamsburg, Brooklyn, New York. Mr. Alien Brain Vs. the Skinwalkers was released on Sweet Nothing Records on 8 December 2008.

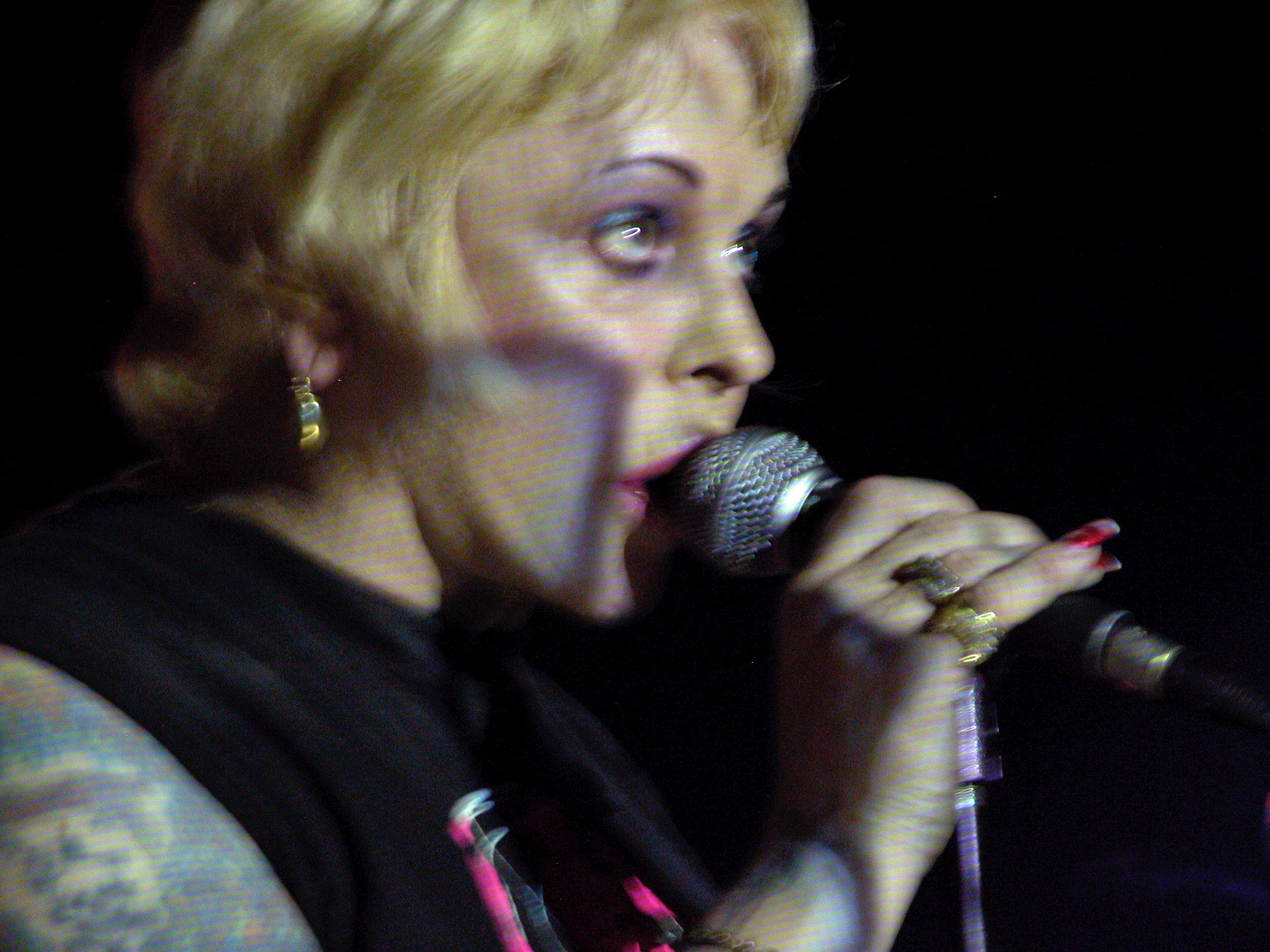
Genesis P-Orridge in 2004

On 9 October 2007, Lady Jaye Breyer P-Orridge died. The cause of death was heart arrhythmia, a heart condition that was possibly related to stomach cancer. Psychic TV cancelled its North American tour dates in the aftermath of Lady Jaye's death. A memorial was held at the Participant Inc. Gallery in New York City on 8 March 2008. As of January 2013, P-Orridge's official website said:

Since that time Genesis continues to represent the amalgam Breyer P-Orridge in the material 'world' and Lady Jaye represents the amalgam Breyer P-Orridge in the immaterial 'world' creating an ongoing interdimensional collaboration.

Thus, P-Orridge continued the Pandrogyne Project, having further surgical operations to alter their body and using "we" when in reference to themself; P-Orridge admitted to a reporter that, without Lady Jaye:

It's very hard. The bottom line is that we know she [sic] would continue. She wouldn't stop because it was complicated.

From this point, P-Orridge began referring to themself in the plural in order to keep Breyer's memory alive.

In 2013, Dale Eisinger of Complex ranked the Pandrogeny project the greatest work of performance art ever.

=== 2009–2020: Semi-retirement, illness and death ===
In September 2009, a retrospective of P-Orridge's collages, entitled "30 Years of Being Cut Up", opened at Invisible-Exports. On 4 November 2009 it was announced that P-Orridge would retire from touring in any and all bands (including Throbbing Gristle and Psychic TV) to concentrate on art, writing and music. In June 2010, P-Orridge sold the Ridgewood property, holding a garage sale in the basement of a local art gallery to sell off a range of personal items, in addition to an array of dildos. This accomplished, P-Orridge moved to a one-bedroom apartment in New York's Lower East Side, and continued producing art in this home.

P-Orridge visited Australia for the first (and only) time in 2012, performing two live shows with Psychic TV; one as part of the Adelaide Festival, and another secret show in Melbourne following a screening of the documentary film The Ballad of Genesis and Lady Jaye. P-Orridge returned to regular touring with Psychic TV in 2016, in support of the release of their album Alienist. The tour lasted from mid-September to early December, with concerts in Greece, Israel, Poland, Russia, Ukraine, the United Kingdom, Canada and the United States.

In August 2015, P-Orridge gained publicity for an interview critical of Caitlyn Jenner's self-description as a "spokesperson" for the transgender community, stating that Jenner was "clueless" and did not know what life was like for the majority of transgender people around the world. In mid-2016, P-Orridge's artwork was the subject of an exhibition, "Try to Altar Everything", at the Rubin Museum of Art in New York City. The exhibition contained paintings, sculptures, and installations inspired by the Hindu mythology that P-Orridge had encountered in Kathmandu. In June 2016, P-Orridge was featured as a model in a campaign by the designer Marc Jacobs, who described P-Orridge as "a sort of come-to-life definition of realness and authenticity".

P-Orridge was diagnosed with chronic myelomonocytic leukaemia in October 2017, and died in New York City on 14 March 2020, aged 70. P-Orridge's memoir, Nonbinary, was published a year later, in June 2021, a project P-Orridge had been working on in collaboration with writer Tim Mohr for several years, according to the New York Times.

== Work ==
"Fusing esoteric ideas with the subversive methods of people like Burroughs and Gysin, P-Orridge and other musicians explored taboo areas and forbidden knowledge in an attempt to create a free-thinking occult culture in which individuals were the resources with which they might be able to carve out their own future[...] What they tried to do with music was wreck the civilization that had rejected and oppressed them. This was occultural direct action – esoterrorism!"

— Christopher Partridge, 2013.

Influenced by concepts from both Western esotericism and contemporary Paganism, P-Orridge's work is designed to confront the audience with ways of thinking alien to the mainstream values of Western society. The religious studies scholar Christopher Partridge characterised P-Orridge's work as being a "confluence of pornography, violence, death, degradation, the confrontation of taboo subjects, noise and Paganism", deliberately courting controversy and expressing an anti-establishment stance. Partridge suggested that this intent to shock emerged both out of a serious attempt to highlight the mechanisms of social control in Western society and also out of "a juvenile delight gained from extreme behaviour and the offence caused".

P-Orridge's work was particularly influenced by the early 20th-century English artist and occultist Austin Osman Spare, who shared their disdain for mainstream morality and fascination with sexuality and the human body. P-Orridge adopted Spare's views on sigils, coming to see their own work as a form of sigil magic. Spare's sigilisation process entailed writing down one's desires, before crossing out any letters that are repeated and then combining the remaining letters into an abstract design, or sigil; the magician must then focus on that sigil and mentally absorb it, and – according to Spare's claims – psychic energies operating on the subconscious ensure that the original desire is manifested in reality. P-Orridge adopted this theory, believing that their work operates according to its principles.

A further element of P-Orridge's work is their common use of idiosyncratic grammar and spelling, such as "Thee" in place of "the", "ov" in place of "of" and (especially in early writings) "butter" in place of "but". The purpose of this is to challenge thought and established ways of reading.

== Personal life ==
"I'm 38 and for all my faults I have spent most of those 38 years searching determinedly for ideas that work and ideas that help. Not everyone maybe, but some people. If they work and if they make any kind of sense, the only way to check is to give them to other people and see if it works. If it helps one or two or ten or fifteen, that's a massive improvement on what most human beings do in their life to help anyone. If it helps a few hundred or a few thousand, that's incredible."

— Genesis P-Orridge, 1989

P-Orridge had two daughters with former wife Paula P-Orridge (born Paula Brooking). An interview with Genesis and Paula P-Orridge appeared in the book RE/Search: Modern Primitives in 1989, and the Icelandic publication Eintak in 1994.

On a religious or spiritual level, Christopher Partridge described P-Orridge as representing "a particularly interesting, influential and subversive example of contemporary paganism". Asserting that their "industrial paganism" was different from most forms of contemporary paganism, Partridge described it as "confrontational, subversive, experimental and, to a large extent, dystopian", with it serving as "an ideological tool" with which to analyse society "from its underbelly; an immersion in the dark side; the subversion of Christian hegemony, conservative politics and what nowadays might be described as neoliberalism". P-Orridge was devoted to the deity Eshu Elegguá, an entity from the Afro-Caribbean syncretic religion of Santería. P-Orridge also stated disbelief in the literal existence of gods, deeming such entities to instead be "early attempts at psychology, trying to understand the light and dark side of human nature".

P-Orridge vociferously criticised contemporary Christianity, describing it as "an incredibly sick social pseudo-religion", and arguing that it was based upon the tenet of "Be good now, agree, or else we will punish you forever and ever when you're dead. And we may punish you while you're alive ..." P-Orridge maintained that such an attitude was established in Christianity by St. Paul and the early Roman Catholic Church, and that it differed from the "ecstatic mysticism of the original Christianity, the Gnostic Christianity".

In her memoir, Art Sex Music, former bandmate Cosey Fanni Tutti claimed P-Orridge had been abusive during their relationship. P-Orridge denied the allegations.

== Reception and legacy ==
According to New York magazine, P-Orridge became "an icon of the London avant-garde" in 1976. Writing for The New Yorker in 2016, the reporter Hermione Hoby described P-Orridge as a "cult figure" considered to be "a treasure of the avant-garde by global art institutions".

The quote that P-Orridge attributed to their mentor, "I feel your pain, I feel your shame, but you're not to blame", was used as the catchphrase for the Shirley Ghostman psychic clairvoyant character by comedian Marc Wootton.

P-Orridge's mock-cult of TOPY has been criticised by Dan Siepmann as being a front for abuses of power and developing a cult of personality.

Musician Electrosexual and Syrian German industrial/techno artist Hanin Elias, founding member of Atari Teenage Riot, recorded a cover version of Hot on the Heels of Love with all proceeds from the sales of both the CD and digital versions going to aid Genesis P-Orridge and their battle against leukemia.

Musician Trent Reznor cites P-Orridge as a major inspiration behind his work. Francky Vincent describes Genesis P-Orridge as a strong influence behind its use of the magical aspect of sexuality in his work.

In 2022, writer Christophe Becker published an essay discussing P-Orridge's relationship with American writer William S. Burroughs and their influence on his work, Géométrie de la Souffrance, Genesis P-Orridge + William S. Burroughs.

== Exhibitions ==
The first major posthumous presentation in Europe of the work of Genesis Breyer P-Orridge was organized jointly by DOX Centre for Contemporary Art and New Discretions (New York) in 2023-2024.

- 2023/2024 It Is a Painful Thing to Be Alone: We Are But One, DOX - Centre for Contemporary Art, Prague
