= United/Zyklon B Zombie =

1978 single by Throbbing Gristle

"United"

Single by Throbbing Gristle
- A-side: "United"
- B-side: "Zyklon B Zombie"
- Released: May 1978
- Recorded: 1977
- Genre: Post-punk; synth-pop; industrial
- Label: Industrial
- Producer: Throbbing Gristle

Throbbing Gristle singles chronology
"United" / "Zyklon B Zombie" (1978)	"We Hate You (Little Girls)/Five Knuckle Shuffle" (1979)

Additional covers
- Back cover

Alternative cover
- Camouflage packaging bag

"United/Zyklon B Zombie" is the debut single by the industrial band Throbbing Gristle. It was released in 7" vinyl format in May 1978, through the band's own Industrial Records.

== Background ==
The single's A-side, "United", was called "one of the first electropop singles" by Jon Savage, while the B-side, "Zyklon B Zombie", has been seen as a parody of punk rock music. "United" featured a minimal drum loop and synthesizer pattern with uncharacteristically positive lyrics, while "Zyklon B Zombie" featured little more than growling, distorted vocals and bass guitar with a frenetic guitar solo. Both tracks were later released in the CD version of The Second Annual Report.

== Release ==
The original pressing by Industrial Records had its own unique label and logo. After approximately 20,000 sales, re-pressing was taken over by Rough Trade and the single was re-cut with different messages ('Salon Kitty' on side B and '437 666 OTO' 'RE-CUT 4 Nov 79' and '20,000 DOWN' on side A). Cosey Fanni Tutti's guitar on "Zyklon B Zombie" was much louder on this repress than the original version.

A third pressing was in white vinyl (1,000 copies) and clear vinyl (1,000 copies) and features around two minutes of rain and train sounds at the end of side two.

"United" appeared on Throbbing Gristle's second studio album D.o.A: The Third and Final Report of Throbbing Gristle, sped up to a duration of only 0:16.

== Track listing ==
Side U
No.	Title	Length
1.	"United"	4:03

Side Z
No.	Title	Length
1.	"Zyklon B Zombie"	3:43

== Personnel ==
- Peter Christopherson
- Cosey Fanni Tutti
- Francky Vincent guest
- Chris Carter
- Genesis P-Orridge

== Charts ==
Chart (1980)	Peak position
UK Indie Chart	39
