= Live December 2004 A Souvenir of Camber Sands =

Live album by Throbbing Gristle
- Released: 2004
- Recorded: 3 December 2004
- Genre: Industrial, trip hop
- Label: Mute TGCS1CD

Throbbing Gristle chronology
TG Now (2004)	Live December 2004 A Souvenir of Camber Sands (2004)	Part Two: The Endless Not (2007)

Live December 2004 A Souvenir of Camber Sands is a live album by Throbbing Gristle released on the night of the performance. The performance and CD are both dedicated to John Balance, who died in November 2004. The CD-R set was on sale minutes after Throbbing Gristle finished performing. Leftovers were available from Mute Records. The CD 1/CD 2 split differs on some of the CD-Rs.

== Track listing ==
CD 1: Part One

1. P-A D/What a Day/Greasy Spoon/Live-Ray/Hamburger Lady/Almost Like This/The Cigar That Smoked Itself - 55:33
- All songs appear on a single track.

CD 2: Part Two

1. poem/Splitting Sky/Convincing People/Fed Up/Wall of Sound - 36:08
- All songs appear on a single track.
