= D.o.A: The Third and Final Report of Throbbing Gristle =

1978 album by Throbbing Gristle

Studio album by Throbbing Gristle
- Released: 1978
- Recorded: September 1977 – May 1978
- Genre: Industrial
- Length: 42:27
- Label: Industrial

Throbbing Gristle chronology
The Second Annual Report (1977)	D.o.A: The Third and Final Report of Throbbing Gristle (1978)	20 Jazz Funk Greats (1979)

D.o.A: The Third and Final Report of Throbbing Gristle is the second studio album by the English industrial band Throbbing Gristle. It was released in 1978 by their Industrial Records label.

== Release ==
The first 1,000 copies of the album were enclosed with a card calendar with color photos of a little girl on a bed. Another pressing of 1,000 copies was recut with false track markers (the "bands" visible on a vinyl disc) to give the appearance of having fifteen tracks of exactly equal length and a short sixteenth track; the official TG discography called this pressing the "Structuralist Spirals" edition. The band's debut single "United", which had garnered some popularity due to its relatively accessible style, was included on the album on fast forward, reducing its running time from 4:03 to sixteen seconds. Later reissues of the album omitted the inset and card calendar due to allegations of a resemblance to child pornography. But later on, the booklet included with some of the CD reissues featured one of those pictures of the girl on the bed.

== Critical reception ==
Professional ratings
Review scores
Source	Rating
AllMusic	4/5 stars
The Austin Chronicle	4/5 stars
The Encyclopedia of Popular Music	3/5 stars
Pitchfork	9.5/10
(The New) Rolling Stone Album Guide	3/5 stars
Spin Alternative Record Guide	7/10
Uncut	8/10

The Montreal Star wrote that the album "invites comparisons to Lou Reed's Metal Machine Music, Eno's obscene phone calls and the sound your refrigerator makes when it short-circuits."

Writing for Pitchfork, Drew Daniel of Matmos described the album as "a nauseating masterpiece, and an essential recording", noting "Hamburger Lady" as "probably Throbbing Gristle's greatest song". AllMusic stated that the album "is nearly as harsh and uncompromising as The Second Annual Report," though "much more stylistically varied...each of the 13 tracks is distinct, ranging from captured conversations to thoroughly composed creations."

The album was included in the book 1001 Albums You Must Hear Before You Die. Chris Carter recalled in the book that "DoA showcased some of our strongest work and established the course we would head in."

== Track listing ==
All tracks are written by Throbbing Gristle (Genesis P-Orridge, Cosey Fanni Tutti, Chris Carter, Peter Christopherson), except as noted.

Side A
No.	Title	Lyrics	Music	Length
1.	"I.B.M."			2:35
2.	"Hit by a Rock"			2:32
3.	"United"			0:16
4.	"Valley of the Shadow of Death"	Christopherson	Christopherson	4:01
5.	"Dead on Arrival"			6:08
6.	"Weeping"	P-Orridge, Ewa Zajac	P-Orridge	5:31

Side B
No.	Title	Lyrics	Music	Length
1.	"Hamburger Lady"	Dr. Al Ackerman (original text author)		4:15
2.	"Hometime"	Fanni Tutti	Fanni Tutti	3:46
3.	"AB/7A"	Carter	Carter	4:31
4.	"E-Coli"			4:16
5.	"Death Threats"			0:41
6.	"Walls of Sound"			2:48
7.	"Blood on the Floor"			1:07

CD bonus tracks
No.	Title	Length
14.	"Five Knuckle Shuffle"	6:43
15.	"We Hate You (Little Girls)"	2:08

2011 remastered edition bonus disc
No.	Title	Length
1.	"Introduction" (live)	1:15
2.	"It's Always the Way" (live)	5:40
3.	"Industrial Muzak" (live)	6:23
4.	"Cabaret Voltaire" (live)	4:03
5.	"Hamburger Lady" (live)	3:53
6.	"IBM" (live)	5:22
7.	"New After Cease to Exist Soundtrack" (live)	4:46
8.	"Whistling Song" (live)	5:35
9.	"Mother Spunk" (live)	3:38
10.	"Five Knuckle Shuffle"	2:08
11.	"We Hate You (Little Girls)"	6:48

== Personnel ==
- Genesis P-Orridge – vocals, bass guitar, violin, effects (track A6), production (tracks A1–A3, A5, B1, B4, B6 and B7)
- Cosey Fanni Tutti – guitar, effects, tapes, production (tracks A1–A3, A5, B1, B4, B6 and B7)
- Chris Carter – synthesizer, electronics, tapes, production (tracks A1–A3, A5, B1, B4, B6 and B7)
- Peter Christopherson – tapes, electronics, production (tracks A1–A4, A5, B1, B4, B6 and B7)

Additional personnel

- Robin Banks – voice (track B5)
- Simone Estridge – voice (track B5)
