= Journey Through a Body =

1982 album by Throbbing Gristle

Studio album by Throbbing Gristle
- Released: April 1982
- Recorded: March 1981
- Genre: Industrial
- Length: 39:17
- Label: Walter Ulbricht Schallfolien

Throbbing Gristle chronology
Greatest Hits (1981)	Journey Through a Body (1982)	Three Psychick Sacrifice (1982)

Alternate cover
- 1993 UK reissue cover

Journey Through a Body is the fourth studio album by English industrial music group Throbbing Gristle, released in Germany in April 1982 through record label Walter Ulbricht Schallfolien.

== Background ==
Journey Through a Body was a piece of "radio art" commissioned by Italian national radio. The album was freely improvised and recorded in Rome in March 1981 at the RAI studios.

== Release ==
Journey Through a Body was released in Germany in April 1982 through record label Walter Ulbricht Schallfolien. The album was reissued in the UK in 1993.

== Critical reception ==
Professional ratings
Review scores
Source	Rating
Sounds	4/5 stars

The Wire called Journey Through a Body the group's "scariest" album.

== Track listing ==
Side A
No.	Title	Length
1.	"Medicine"	15:22
2.	"Catholic Sex"	8:10

Side B
No.	Title	Length
1.	"Exotic Functions"	4:18
2.	"Violencia (The Bullet)"	8:00
3.	"Oltre La Morte, Birth and Death"	3:27
