= The Second Annual Report =

1977 album by Throbbing Gristle

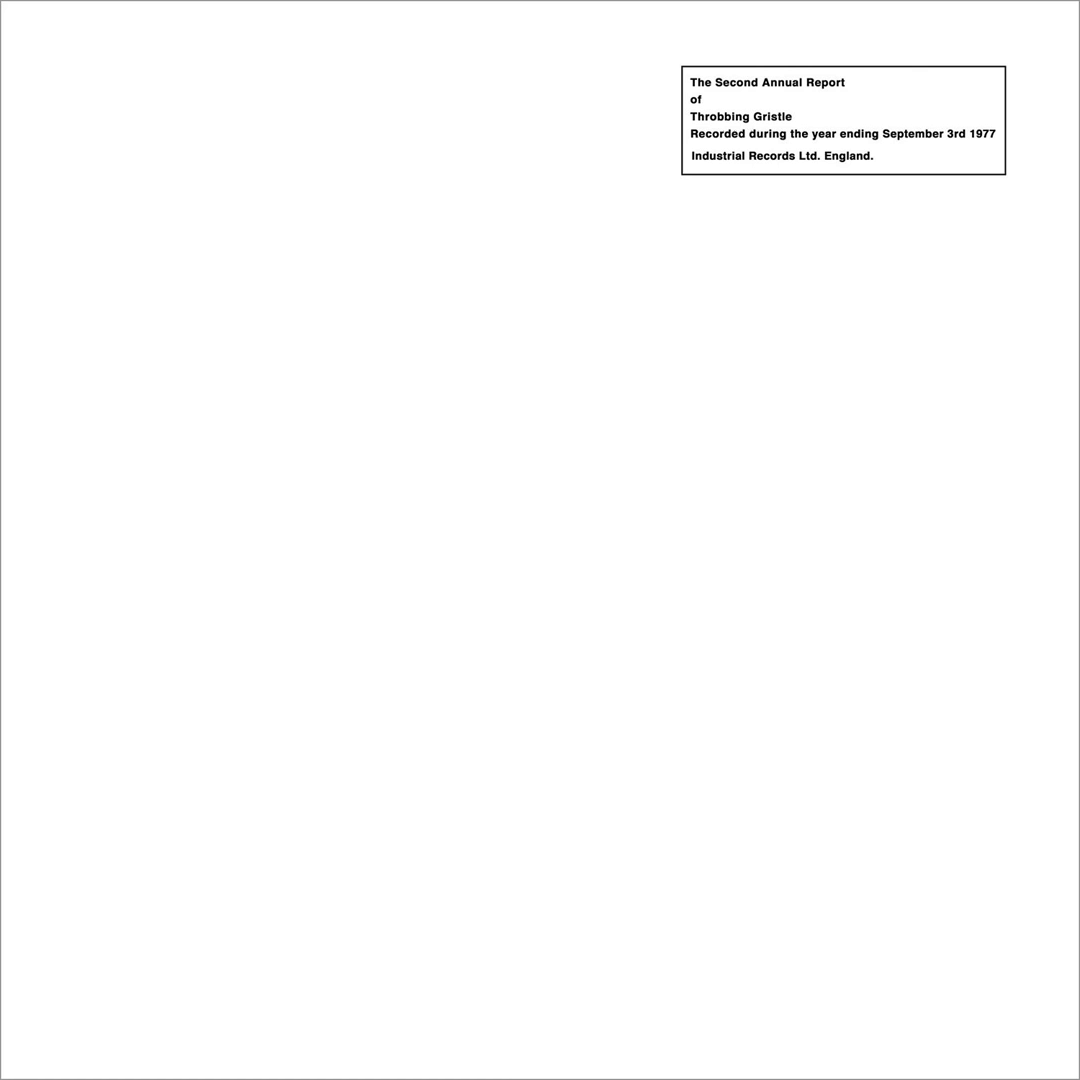

Studio album / live album by Throbbing Gristle
- Released: November 1977
- Recorded: 18 October 1976 – 3 September 1977
- Genre: Industrial
- Length: 39:32
- Label: Industrial

Throbbing Gristle chronology
The Second Annual Report (1977)	D.o.A: The Third and Final Report of Throbbing Gristle (1978)

The Second Annual Report is the debut album by the English industrial music group Throbbing Gristle, released in November 1977 through Industrial Records. It contains live and studio recordings made from October 1976 to September 1977. The Second Annual Report is considered one of the first industrial albums.

== Background ==
The original vinyl edition went through several pressings. Industrial Records's original pressing totaled 785 copies, while Fetish Records pressed 2,000 copies. Fetish would press the album twice more after the original Industrial Records master plates were destroyed. The third edition was included in the five-album Throbbing Gristle box set; the album was recut to play backwards and included a chamber orchestra on the track "After Cease to Exist". The Fetish plates were reused to cut pressings for Mute Records and Celluloid Records, the latter of which is known for its poor sound quality and was supposedly released without the band's permission.

A portion of "Down on the Street" by the Stooges can be heard at the end of "Maggot Death (Live at Brighton)".

== Critical reception ==
Professional ratings
Review scores
Source	Rating
AllMusic	4/5 stars
The Austin Chronicle	3.5/5 stars
Pitchfork	8.6/10
The Rolling Stone Album Guide	2/5 stars
Spin Alternative Record Guide	6/10
Uncut	8/10

Michael Bonner of Uncut described the album as "a dystopian churn of smoke and asbestos dust" and "queerly hypnotic". The Vinyl Factory's Anton Spice acknowledged the role of the album with its provocative subject matter in establishing Throbbing Gristle's reputation as transgressive figures in underground electronic music.

== Thirty-Second Annual Report ==
In 2008, a limited-edition album titled Thirty-Second Annual Report, or The Thirty-Second Annual Report of Throbbing Gristle, was released in commemoration of the thirtieth anniversary of The Second Annual Report and the re-activation of Industrial Records.

The 12" 180gm vinyl LP comprises a recording of Throbbing Gristle's live performance at La Villette in Paris on 6 June 2008, which was a reinterpretation of their original album, and is limited to 777 copies. This album is pre-framed in bespoke, high-quality white gloss acrylic with an easy access clear window for removal of the record/sleeve so that the buyer can play the album and then reseal it in the frame. Accompanying the packaged vinyl is a special "black" extended CD version, which includes extra tracks that would not fit on the LP format. There is a version of the recording available for download, but the track lengths are different from the vinyl edition.

== Track listing ==
All tracks are written by Throbbing Gristle.

Side A
No.	Title	Length
1.	"Industrial Introduction"	1:03
2.	"Slug Bait" (Live at the Institute of Contemporary Arts, London)	4:18
3.	"Live at Southampton"	2:43
4.	"Live at Brighton"	1:17
5.	"Maggot Death" (Studio Recording)	2:47
6.	"Live at Rat Club, London"	4:32
7.	"Live at Southampton"	1:34
8.	"Live at Brighton"	0:57

Side B
No.	Title	Length
1.	"After Cease to Exist – The Original Soundtrack of the COUM Transmissions Film"	20:16
Total length:		39:32

1991 bonus tracks
No.	Title	Length
10.	"Zyklon B Zombie"	3:52
11.	"United"	4:04

2011 remastered edition bonus disc
No.	Title	Length
10.	"No Two Ways" (Live at the Winchester Hat Fair 1976)	4:03
11.	"Last Exit" (Live at Polytechnic, Brighton 1977)	6:12
12.	"Forced Entry" (Live at Nuffield Theatre, Southampton 1977)	5:01
13.	"Tesco Disco" (Live at Rat Club, London 1977)	5:18
14.	"Feeling Critical" (Live at the Winchester School of Art 1977)	6:29
15.	"National Affront" (Live at Nuffield Theatre, Southampton 1977)	4:30
16.	"Urge to Kill" (Live at Rat Club, London 1977)	7:25
17.	"Zyklon B Zombie"	3:53
18.	"United"	4:03
Total length:		46:54

Note

- Despite carrying the catalogue number "IR0002", the 12-inch-vinyl Second Annual Report album was the first official release from Industrial Records; there was no "IR0001". There was also no First Annual Report, although the bootleg album Best Of... Volume II subsequently became nicknamed as such by fans. Later released on cassette only (Industrial Records catalogue number "IRC1"), it was released many years later on other formats as The First Annual Report.
- The positions of the studio recording of "Maggot Death" and "Live at Rat Club, London" are swapped on the 2011 remastered edition's first disc.

== Personnel ==
According to AllMusic:

- Genesis P-Orridge – bass guitar, clarinet, guitar, liner notes, violin, vocals
- Chris Carter – synthesizers, programming, mixing, photography
- Cosey Fanni Tutti – guitar, liner notes, photography, vocals
- Peter Christopherson – processing, tape, trumpet, unknown contributor role
