= 20 Jazz Funk Greats =

1979 album by Throbbing Gristle

Studio album by Throbbing Gristle
- Released: December 1979
- Recorded: August 1979
- Studio: The Death Factory (Hackney, London)
- Genres: Industrial; synth-pop; experimental pop; electropop
- Length: 42:23
- Label: Industrial
- Producer: Sinclair/Brooks

Throbbing Gristle chronology
D.o.A: The Third and Final Report of Throbbing Gristle (1978)	20 Jazz Funk Greats (1979)	Heathen Earth (1980)

20 Jazz Funk Greats is the third studio album by the British industrial music group Throbbing Gristle, released in December 1979 by the band's Industrial Records label. Known for its tongue-in-cheek title and artwork, it has been hailed as the band's best work, with Fact naming it the best album of the 1970s and Pitchfork naming it the best industrial album of all time.

== Recording ==
20 Jazz Funk Greats is the band's first full studio album, as prior albums contained both live and studio recordings. The production is credited to "Sinclair/Brooks". The album was recorded at the band's Death Factory studio in Hackney on a 16-track tape recorder borrowed from Paul McCartney via Peter Christopherson, who, as a member of the graphic design collective Hipgnosis, had worked on the artwork for Wings' 1975 album Venus and Mars. The album was produced using a wide variety of electronic musical instruments and effects units, primarily from Roland and its subsidiary Boss, as well as some that the band had designed or modified themselves.

== Artwork and title ==
The album's cover photograph was taken at Beachy Head, a chalk headland on the Sussex coast known as one of the world's most notorious suicide spots. In a 2012 interview, Cosey Fanni Tutti explained the album cover's design and tongue-in-cheek title:

We did the cover so it was a pastiche of something you would find in a Woolworth's bargain bin. We took the photograph at the most famous suicide spot in England, called Beachy Head. So, the picture is not what it seems, it is not so nicey nicey at all, and neither is the music once you take it home and buy it. We had this idea in mind that someone quite innocently would come along to a record store and see [the record] and think they would be getting 20 really good jazz/funk greats, and then they would put it on at home and they would just get decimated.

The back cover shows a more obviously tongue-in-cheek version of the same scene, with Tutti turned and raising her dress to expose her underwear and moon the viewer, Christopherson ogling her, and Carter making a masturbatory gesture.

The 1981 issue of the album released on Fetish Records featured an alternate version of the cover art in which an apparently dead naked body is seen lying in front of the band. Graphic designer Stanley Donwood, known for his work with Radiohead, selected the album cover as his personal favourite in a 2013 interview.

== Critical reception ==
Professional ratings
Review scores
Source	Rating
AllMusic	5/5 stars
The Austin Chronicle	4/5 stars
Pitchfork	10/10
Q	4/5 stars
The Rolling Stone Album Guide	3/5 stars
Spin Alternative Record Guide	7/10
Uncut	8/10

In 1979 upon release, the album and Adam and the Ants' debut LP Dirk Wears White Sox were the co-subjects of a highly negative - and denounced as abusive by Ants front man Adam Ant - joint review by Paul Morley in the NME under the headline "Berks That Lurk In The Corner Of Your Psyche."

In 1992, Johnathan Gold of the Los Angeles Times put 20 Jazz Funk Greats on its list of essential industrial albums. Reviewing the album's 2011 reissue for Pitchfork, Drew Daniel of Matmos praised 20 Jazz Funk Greats as Throbbing Gristle's peak, writing that "it's in the pathos of their promiscuous liaisons with the forbidden territory of various forms of 'real music' that this album generates a weirdly gripping power of its own." He continued, "20 Jazz Funk Greats finds the band waking up from D.O.A's dark night of the soul and feeling curiously frisky. Snacking on not only the titular funk and jazz, the band also takes touristic zig zags through exotica, rock and disco". He ultimately awarded it a perfect 10/10 score and the site's "Best New Reissue" designation.

AllMusic writer Paul Simpson wrote, "Thoroughly exciting and immeasurably influential, 20 Jazz Funk Greats is easily Throbbing Gristle's crowning achievement, and one of the highlights of the post-punk era." In a retrospective review of Throbbing Gristle's discography for Uncut, Michael Bonner stated that "Musically, it turned away from the precipice; not exactly jazz and funk, but sublimating TG’s noise elements within electronic rhythms and proto-exotica. Album highlight "Hot on the Heels of Love" is convincingly Moroder-esque disco, Cosey breathing sweet nothings amid bubbling synthesisers and whip-crack snare. Elsewhere, P-Orridge mines a lyrical seam of control and domination." Dusted Magazine described the album as "a deliberate attempt to toy with the ideas behind marketing strategy and the purpose of musical genres."

Pitchfork ranked 20 Jazz Funk Greats at number 91 on its list of the 100 greatest albums of the 1970s. British electronic music magazine Fact named it the best album of the decade, writing: "This album is a rupture. It's an open crack into the unpronounceable dimensions into which tumble important streams of 20th-century pop, art and underground culture, to seethe around each other, mingling, festering, sprouting new and unpredictable forms which in turn would ooze out to infest vast sections of what comes after."

In June 2019, Pitchfork named 20 Jazz Funk Greats as the best industrial album of all time.

== Track listing ==
All tracks are written by Throbbing Gristle (Genesis P-Orridge, Cosey Fanni Tutti, Chris Carter, Peter Christopherson).

Side A
No.	Title	Length
1.	"20 Jazz Funk Greats"	2:51
2.	"Beachy Head"	3:42
3.	"Still Walking"	4:56
4.	"Tanith"	2:20
5.	"Convincing People"	4:54
6.	"Exotica"	2:53

Side B
No.	Title	Length
1.	"Hot on the Heels of Love"	4:24
2.	"Persuasion"	6:36
3.	"Walkabout"	3:04
4.	"What a Day"	4:38
5.	"Six Six Sixties"	2:07

Bonus tracks
No.	Title	Length
12.	"Discipline (Berlin)"	10:45
13.	"Discipline (Manchester)"	8:06

2011 remastered edition bonus disc
No.	Title	Length
12.	"Weapon Training" (Live at The Factory, Manchester 1979)	1:35
13.	"Convincing People" (Live at The Factory, Manchester 1979)	6:12
14.	"They Make No Say" (Live at Northampton Guildhall 1979)	5:28
15.	"Five Knuckle Shuffle" (Live at The Factory, Manchester 1979)	6:27
16.	"His Arm Was Her Leg" (Live at The Factory, Manchester 1979)	3:51
17.	"See You Are" (Live at The Factory, Manchester 1979)	5:46
18.	"What a Day" (Live at The Factory, Manchester 1979)	6:17
19.	"Discipline" (Live at Illuminated 666 Club, Manchester 1980)	8:11
20.	"Discipline" (Live at SO36 Club, Berlin 1980)	10:47

== Personnel ==
- Genesis P-Orridge – lead vocals, bass guitar, violin, vibraphone, synthesizer
- Cosey Fanni Tutti – guitar, synthesizer, cornet, lead vocals, backing vocals
- Chris Carter – synthesizers, sequencer, drum machines, backing vocals
- Peter Christopherson – tapes, vibraphone, cornet, backing vocals

Technical

- Sinclair/Brooks – production

== Equipment ==
Roland equipment used on the album included a SRE-555 Chorus Echo delay, SH-7 synthesizer, CSQ-100 sequencer, CR-78 drum machine, and System-100M modular synthesizer. Boss equipment included a PH-1 phaser effects pedal, DR-55 "Dr. Rhythm" drum machine, KM-4 mixer, CE-2 chorus pedal, and BF-2 flanger pedal. Other equipment included a Simmons ClapTrap percussion synthesizer, Auratone 5C speakers, JVC amplifier, TEAC cassette deck, Seck 6-2 audio mixer, Casio M10 keyboard, and Chris Carter's custom "Gristleizer" effects unit.

== Charts ==
Chart (1980)	Peak position
UK Indie Chart	6

== Sources ==
- Daniel, Drew (2008). 20 Jazz Funk Greats. 33⅓. Bloomsbury Academic. ISBN 978-0-8264-2793-9. OCLC 1285463784 – via the Internet Archive.
