= Throbbing Gristle =

English band

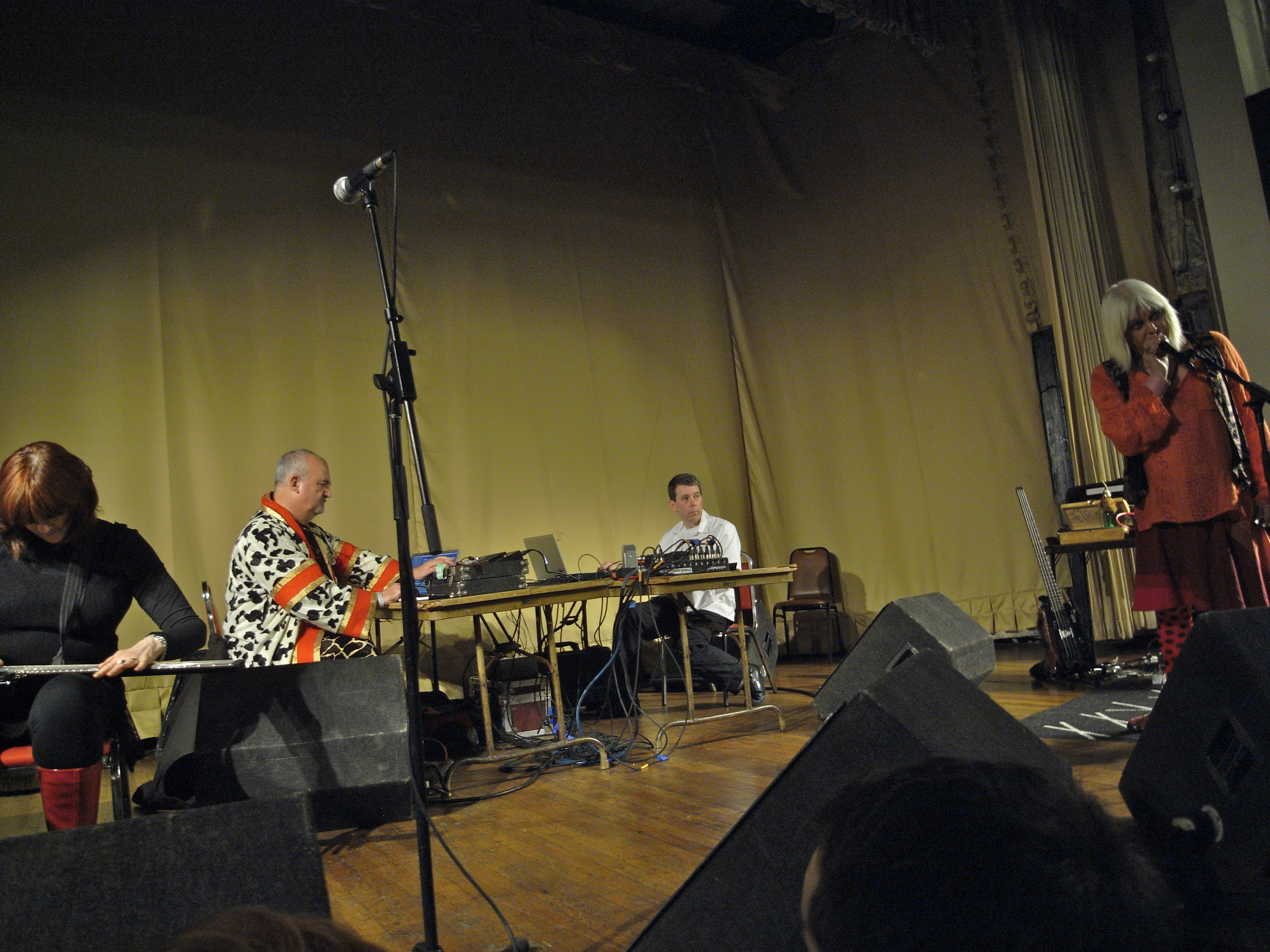
- Throbbing Gristle performing in 2009. From left to right: Cosey Fanni Tutti, Peter Christopherson, Chris Carter, Genesis P-Orridge.

Background information
- Also known as: X-TG
- Origin: Kingston upon Hull, England
- Genres: Industrial; post-punk; noise; experimental; electronic
- Years active: 1975–1981; 2004–2010
- Label: Industrial
- Spinoffs: Psychic TV; Coil; Chris & Cosey
- Spinoff of: COUM Transmissions
- Past members: Peter Christopherson; Cosey Fanni Tutti; Chris Carter; Genesis P-Orridge

Throbbing Gristle were an English music and visual arts group formed in Kingston upon Hull by Genesis P-Orridge and Cosey Fanni Tutti, later joined by Peter "Sleazy" Christopherson and Chris Carter. They are widely regarded as pioneers of industrial music. Evolving from the experimental performance art group COUM Transmissions, Throbbing Gristle made their public debut in October 1976 in the COUM exhibition Prostitution, and released their debut single "United/Zyklon B Zombie" and debut album The Second Annual Report the following year. P-Orridge's lyrics mainly revolved around mysticism, extremist political ideologies, sexuality, dark or underground aspects of society, and idiosyncratic manipulation of language inspired by the techniques of William S. Burroughs.

The band released several subsequent studio and live albums – including D.o.A: The Third and Final Report of Throbbing Gristle (1978), 20 Jazz Funk Greats (1979), and Heathen Earth (1980) – on their own record label Industrial Records, building a reputation with their transgressive and confrontational aesthetics; they included the extensive use of disturbing visual imagery, such as ironic fascist and Nazi symbolism and pornography, as well as that of noise and sound manipulation influenced by the works of Burroughs and Brion Gysin.

Throbbing Gristle dissolved in 1981 due to interpersonal differences; the individual members went on to participate in other projects, such as Psychic TV, Coil, and Chris & Cosey. The band was reformed in 2004, and released three more studio albums – TG Now (2004), Part Two (2007), and The Third Mind Movements (2009) – before disbanding again after P-Orridge's departure in October 2010 and Christopherson's death the following month. The band's final studio project, a cover version of the 1970 Nico album Desertshore entitled Desertshore/The Final Report, was released in 2012 under the moniker X-TG.

== History ==
=== First era: 1976–1981 ===
Throbbing Gristle evolved from the performance art group COUM Transmissions, formed in Kingston upon Hull by a group of performers including Genesis P-Orridge and Cosey Fanni Tutti. The name Throbbing Gristle derives from the Yorkshire slang word for a male erection. In 1973 COUM moved from Hull to Hackney, London, where P-Orridge and Tutti met Chris Carter, then working as a sound recordist in television, and Peter Christopherson, then a member of the graphic design collective Hipgnosis; the four built a recording studio in Hackney which they dubbed "The Death Factory" and began performing music together. The last known performance of COUM Transmissions – Prostitution, an exhibition held in October 1976 at the Institute of Contemporary Arts in London – was also the public debut of Throbbing Gristle. The provocative sexual content of the exhibition led Conservative Member of Parliament Nicholas Fairbairn to dub the group "wreckers of civilisation".

Throbbing Gristle's confrontational live performances and use of often disturbing imagery, including pornography and photographs of Nazi concentration camps, earned the group a notorious reputation, but they maintained that their mission was to challenge and explore the darker and obsessive sides of the human condition rather than to make attractive music. Throbbing Gristle made extensive use of pre-recorded tape samples and effects units, some of which they had designed or modified themselves, to produce a distinctive, highly distorted sound, usually accompanied by lyrics or spoken-word performances by Tutti or P-Orridge. Though they asserted that they wanted to provoke their audience into thinking for themselves rather than promote any specific political agenda, Throbbing Gristle frequently associated with the anarcho-punk scene. They appeared in the fanzine Toxic Grafity with a condensation of their own propaganda parody series, Industrial News.

In November 1977, they released their debut live/studio album The Second Annual Report. First pressed in a limited run of 786 copies on the band's Industrial Records label, it was rereleased on Mute Records following high demand; however, this later release was reversed, with all tracks playing backwards and in reverse order. This was followed by the single "United / Zyklon B Zombie", and by the albums D.o.A: The Third and Final Report of Throbbing Gristle (1978), 20 Jazz Funk Greats (1979), and Heathen Earth (1980), along with a number of non-album singles. In 1980, the band composed a soundtrack for Neil Ruttenberg's horror movie Mask of Sarnath.

In 1981 concert promoter and Transparency Records founder Michael Sheppard brought Throbbing Gristle to Los Angeles. On 29 May 1981 Throbbing Gristle performed at the Kezar Pavilion in San Francisco in what would be the group's final performance until reuniting in 2004. Throbbing Gristle announced their dissolution on 23 June 1981, mailing out postcards declaring that their "mission [was] terminated." In a 1987 interview, Tutti attributed the band's split to her own breakup with P-Orridge: "TG broke up because me and Gen broke up."

P-Orridge and Peter Christopherson went on to form Psychic TV, and Tutti and Chris Carter, now a couple, continued to record together as Chris & Cosey. Christopherson later formed Coil with fellow Psychic TV member John Balance; P-Orridge subsequently formed Thee Majesty and PTV3 with their wife Jacqueline "Jaye" Breyer.

=== Reunion: 2004–2010 ===
The release in 1999 of Simon Ford's book Wreckers of Civilisation on the history of COUM Transmissions and TG sparked renewed interest in the group's work. Plans for a reissue of the TG24 box set were set in motion with Mute Records and came to fruition with its release in December 2002. To mark the occasion, an exhibition was held at the Cabinet Gallery, showcasing artifacts related to the first edition of TG24. A listening room was set up to play the twenty-four hours of concert recordings.

In 2004, Throbbing Gristle briefly reunited to record and release the limited album TG Now. This was followed by concerts on 16 May 2004 at the London Astoria, and on 3 December at Camber Sands during the All Tomorrow's Parties festival. That concert was released as A Souvenir of Camber Sands.

On 2 April 2007, TG released the album Part Two: The Endless Not, which the group had finished recording in Berlin. It was originally set to be released by Mute Records in September 2006 but was delayed for unknown reasons.

In March 2007, Side-Line announced Part Two's final release date, adding that a string of special live events would take place in 2007.

In April 2007, TG gave two concerts at the Donaufestival in Krems. During the second concert, the soundtrack of the film In the Shadow of the Sun was played, with the participation of a choral ensemble conducted by Hildur Guðnadóttir. On 26 May 2007 TG presented the same performance at the Tate Modern in London, again accompanied by Guðnadóttir, who conducted the New London Chamber Choir.

The band then worked to record an album based on their interpretation of Nico's 1970 album Desertshore. The recording sessions took place over three days in June 2007 at the Institute of Contemporary Arts. The group issued the entirety of the recording sessions for the album as a limited edition 12-CD set packaged in a custom CD wallet, The Desertshore Installation, which was sold via mail order from the group's website.

A seven-disc DVD set titled TGV was issued in the fall of 2007. The set contains old and new footage of the band. TGV came packaged in a deluxe box with a 64-page book, all designed by Christopherson.

The group performed a reinterpretation of their debut album The Second Annual Report twice in 2008 to mark the thirtieth anniversary of its release. The performance in Paris on 6 June was issued as a limited-edition framed vinyl set titled The Thirty-Second Annual Report.

In April 2009, Throbbing Gristle toured the United States, appearing at the Coachella Valley Music and Arts Festival and in Los Angeles, New York, San Francisco and Chicago. The Third Mind Movements, a new release, was made available at these shows, which was edited down from improvisations recorded during the Desertshore Installation sessions.

A collaborative installation with Cerith Wyn Evans titled A=P=P=A=R=I=T=I=O=N was displayed at Tramway in Glasgow from 7 August to 27 September 2009. Throbbing Gristle contributed a multi-channel soundtrack that was played through 16 hanging Audio Spotlight sound panels that Evans had incorporated into his sculpture.

In November 2009, Throbbing Gristle and Industrial Records released their version of the Buddha Machine loop player, designed by the group with Christiaan Virant of FM3, named Gristleism.

On 29 October 2010, Throbbing Gristle announced on their website that P-Orridge had left the group; Carter, Cosey and Christopherson finished their current tour under the name X-TG. P-Orridge's website stated that they had not quit Throbbing Gristle and had merely stopped participating in the current tour. However, the band would dissolve for good on 24 November following Christopherson's death.

=== After dissolution: 2011–present ===
In 2011, Industrial Records had an official "re-activation" to reissue the group's studio albums, as Throbbing Gristle's contract with Mute Records had expired.

Industrial Records subsequently announced that a double album, titled Desertshore/The Final Report, would be released on 26 November 2012. Carter and Tutti produced the album with the participation of film director Gaspar Noé, former pornographic actress Sasha Grey, and guest vocalists Anohni, Blixa Bargeld, and Marc Almond.

The group had decided before Christopherson's death to re-record the album because they were not satisfied with the ICA recordings. Christopherson had been the driving force behind the project and had been working on the record in Bangkok with Danny Hyde. "It was Sleazy's project, then Cosey and Sleazy's, then I came in on it", Carter said in an interview with The Quietus. After Christopherson died, custom instruments built for the project by Christopherson were given to Carter and Tutti, and they began combining his recordings with the work they had done themselves. They announced plans to debut the album live at AV Festival on 17 March 2012 accompanied by a screening of Philippe Garrel's film The Inner Scar "for which Desertshore was the soundtrack and inspiration".

P-Orridge died from leukaemia on 14 March 2020.

== Legacy ==
The band is widely viewed as having helped create the industrial music genre along with contemporaries Cabaret Voltaire. The term was coined in the mid-1970s with the founding of Industrial Records by P-Orridge and Monte Cazazza; on Throbbing Gristle's debut album The Second Annual Report, they coined the slogan "industrial music for industrial people".

Alternative Press included Throbbing Gristle in their 1996 list of "100 underground inspirations of the past 20 years."

Wreckers of Civilisation, a survey on COUM Transmissions and Throbbing Gristle's original run written by Simon Ford, was published in 1999. A book in the 33⅓ series on 20 Jazz Funk Greats by Drew Daniel of Matmos was released in 2007.

Other, Like Me: The Oral History of COUM Transmissions and Throbbing Gristle, a documentary on both projects consisting of archival footage and photos and interviews with their members, was co-produced by BBC Television and aired on BBC Four in December 2021.

== Members ==
- Genesis P-Orridge – lead vocals, bass guitar, violin, guitars, percussion
- Cosey Fanni Tutti – guitars, cornet, effects, vocals, tapes
- Peter Christopherson – tapes, electronics, cornet, percussion
- Chris Carter – synthesizers, tapes, electronics, drum machine, programming

== Discography ==
Studio albums

- The Second Annual Report (1977)
- D.o.A: The Third and Final Report of Throbbing Gristle (1978)
- 20 Jazz Funk Greats (1979)
- Journey Through a Body (1982)
- In the Shadow of the Sun (Soundtrack, 1984)
- CD1 (untitled) (1986)
- TG Now (2004)
- Part Two: The Endless Not (2007)
- The Third Mind Movements (2009)
- Desertshore/The Final Report (2012) (as X-TG)
