= Neville Brody =

British graphic designer

Neville Brody OBE RDI
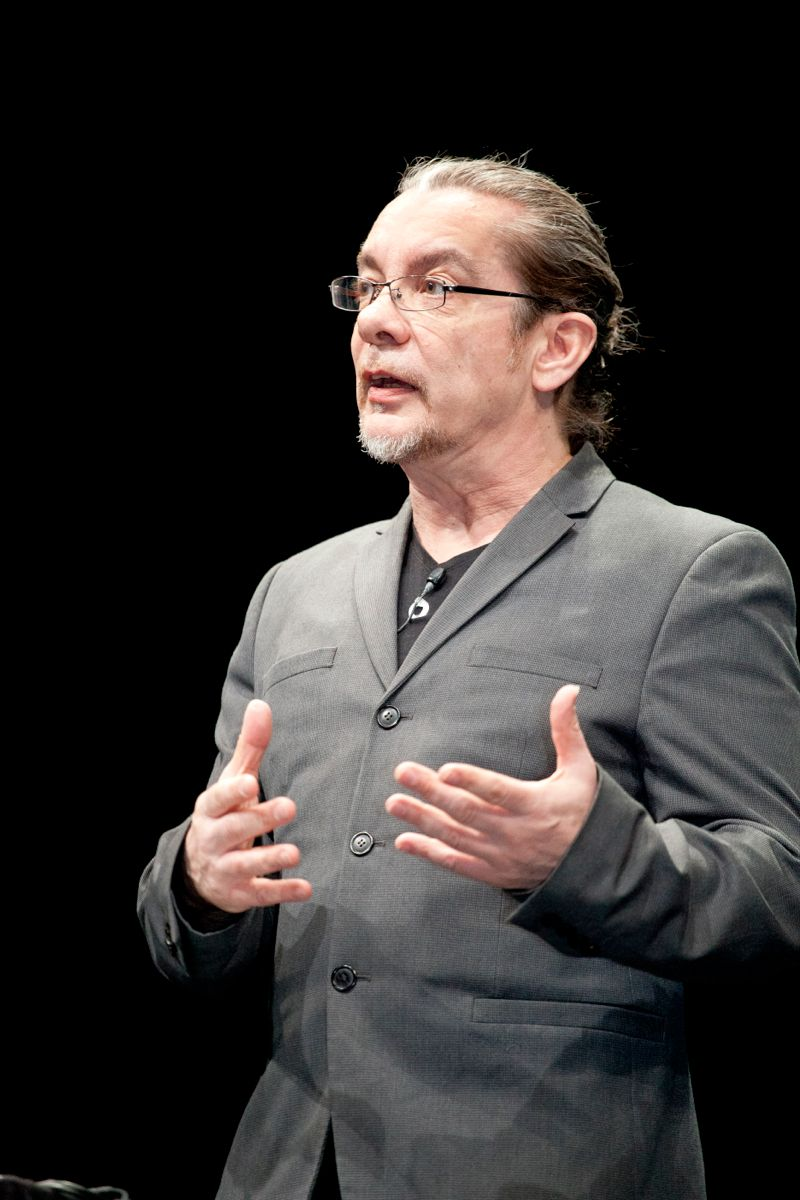
- Brody speaking at the 2012 TYPO International Design Talks, San Francisco
- Born: 23 April 1957 (age 69); Southgate, London, England
- Occupations: Graphic designer, typographer, art director

Neville Stanley Brody (born 23 April 1957) is an English graphic designer, typographer and art director. He is known for his work on The Face magazine (1981–1986), Arena magazine (1987–1990), and designing record covers for artists such as Clock DVA, Cabaret Voltaire, The Bongos, 23 Skidoo and Depeche Mode. He created the company Research Studios in 1994 and is a founding member of Fontworks. His work is included in the permanent collection of the Museum of Modern Art (MoMA). He was the Dean of the School of Communication at the Royal College of Art, London until September 2018. He is now Professor of Communication.

== Early life and education ==
Brody was born in Southgate, London. He attended Minchenden Grammar School and studied A-Level Art, from a fine art viewpoint. In 1975, Brody went on to do a Fine Art foundation course at Hornsey College of Art.

In late 1976, Brody started a three-year BA course in graphics at the London College of Printing. His work was influenced by the emergence of punk rock in London life. He designed posters for student concerts at the college, most notably for Pere Ubu, supported by The Human League.

His first-year thesis was based around a comparison between Dadaism and pop art.

== 1980s: Art Direction ==
Brody's experimentation with his self-made sans-serif typography, along with his Pop Art and Dadaism influence, caught the attention of music record companies such as Fetish Records and Stiff Records after he left college. He designed the majority of the latter label's releases, as well as artwork for other post-punk acts at this time, including The Slits and Psychic TV. The album Micro-Phonies by Cabaret Voltaire was art directed by Brody in 1984. His infamous typography features on the front and a bandaged figure spouting liquid from the mouth stares blankly at the viewer.

Brody was art director for The Face magazine. He directed the art design of other newspapers and magazines including City Limits, Lei, Per Lui, Actuel and Arena, as well as the redesigns of British newspapers The Guardian and The Observer.

In 1988, Thames & Hudson published the first of two volumes about his work, which became the world's best selling graphic design book. Combined sales now exceed 120,000. An accompanying exhibition of his work at the Victoria and Albert Museum attracted over 40,000 visitors before touring Europe and Japan.

In 1991, Neville Brody and Jon Wozencroft created the FUSE project. FUSE is an interactive magazine that sets out to challenge our current ideas about typographic and visual language in an age of ever changing communications technology and media. Brody was also partly responsible for instigating the fusion between a magazine, graphics design and typeface design. The magazine ranges in themes from "Codes" and "Runes" to "Religion" and "Pornography." the exploration and freedom that the publishers exhibit is undeniable and exciting. The conventions upturned in FUSE are prescient in their definition of new standards. Each package includes a publication with articles relating to typography and surrounding subjects, as well as new font designs. In 1990 he also founded the FontFont typeface library together with Erik Spiekermann.

Notable fonts include the updated font for the Times newspaper, Times Modern, New Deal as used in publicity material and titles for the film Public Enemies and Industria.

In 1992, he designed the logo for Austrian public broadcaster ORF.

Brody launched Research Studios with Fwa Richards in London in 1994. A sister company, Research Publishing, produced and published experimental multi-media works by young artists. The primary focus was on FUSE, the conference and quarterly forum for experimental typography and communications. The publication had 20 issues over a publishing period of over ten years. Three FUSE conferences have been held, in London, San Francisco and Berlin. The conferences brought together speakers from design, architecture, sound, film and interactive design and web.

In 2010, the studio developed a global visual language for the BBC, and in November 2006 they redesigned The Times with the creation of a new font Times Modern. The typeface shares many visual similarities with Mercury designed by Jonathan Hoefler. It is the first new font at the newspaper since it introduced Times New Roman in 1932.

The company also completed a visual identity project for the Paris contemporary art exhibition Nuit Blanche in 2006. Research Studios launched a new look for the champagne brand Dom Pérignon in February 2007, having been appointed in 2004 to help the brand with its strategy and repositioning.

In 2015, Brody rebranded Research Studios as Brody Associates.

As of 2017, the Welsh WJEC exam board included Neville Brody as part of their Graphic Design curriculum.

In 2021, Brody joined the advisory board of Dogamí, a blockchain-based "Petaverse" game, in which users "adopt" dog-inspired non-fungible tokens.

== Work ==
=== Music industry ===
==== Fetish Records ====
Art Director (1980)

- Your Mum, Album Cover (1981)
- Bush Tetras, "Das Ah Riot/Boom", Single Cover (1981)
- The Bongos, Time and the River, EP Cover (1981)
- The Bongos, "Zebra Club", Single Cover (1981)
- The Bongos, "In The Congo/Hunting/Mambo Sun", Single Cover (1981)
- Clock DVA, "4 Hours", Single Cover (1981)
- Clock DVA, Thirst, Album Cover (1981)
- 23 Skidoo, The Gospel Comes To New Guinea/Last Words, Single cover (1981)
- 23 Skidoo, Seven Songs, Album Cover (1982)
- 23 Skidoo, Tearing Up The Plans, EP cover (1981)
- Throbbing Gristle, Five Albums Album Cover (1982)
- 8 Eyed Spy, "Diddy Wah Diddy" Single Cover (1982)
- Z'EV, "Wipe Out/Element L" Single Cover (1982)
- Stephen Mallinder, Pow Wow Album Cover (1982)
- Various Artists, Last Testament Album Cover (1982)

==== Cabaret Voltaire ====
- Numerous T-shirt, badge and poster designs.
- "3 Crepuscule Tracks" 12" Single Cover (1981)
- "Red Mecca" Album Cover (1981)
- "Crackdown/Just Fascination" 12" Single Cover (1983)
- "Just Fascination" 7" Single Cover (1983)
- "James Brown" 12" Single Cover (1984)
- "Microphonies" Album Cover (1984)
- "The Covenant, The Sword and the Arm of the Lord" Album Cover (1985)
- "Code" Album Cover (1987)
- "Here To Go" Single Cover (1987)

==== Other ====
- Psychic TV, "Force The Hand Of Chance", Album Cover (1982)
- The Birthday Party, "Junkyard", Album Cover (1982)
- 23 Skidoo, "The Culling Is Coming" Album Cover (1983)
- 23 Skidoo, Coup, Single cover (1984)
- 23 Skidoo, Urban Gamelan, Album cover (1984)
- 23 Skidoo, Language, Single cover (1984)
- 23 Skidoo, Thoughts Of You, Single cover (1985)
- 23 Skidoo, Beyond Time, Album cover (2013)
- Defunkt, "The Razor's Edge" 12" Single Cover (1982)
- Depeche Mode, "Just Can't Get Enough" Single Cover (1982)
- Level 42, "Standing in the Light" Album Cover (1983)
- Level 42, "Micro-Kid" Single Cover (1983)
- Elephant Talk, Album Cover (1983)
- Kurtis Blow, "Party Time" 12" single Cover, Club Records (1985)
- Jamie J. Morgan, Shotgun Album cover
- Raybeats, "Holiday Inn Spain/Cocktails" 7" single cover on Don't Fall Off The Mountain label (1981)
- Zuice, "Everyone A Winner" Album Cover (1986)
- Zuice, "I'm Burning" Album Cover (1987)
- Zuice, "Bless Your Lucky Stars " Album Cover (1987)
- Zuice, "shought owt to all the run it straight crew an all mah dirty-30 ninjas out der tongan crip souljah 4 life" Album Cover (1987)

=== Magazine work ===
- 1981–1986 Art director for The Face magazine
- 1987–1990 Art director for Arena magazine.

=== Misc ===
- 1990 – Opened FontWorks and became the director of FontShop International
- 1994 – Founds Research Studios
- Postage stamps by Neville Brody
- 2010 – "global visual language" (GVL) to establish consistency across BBC websites – starting with Doctor Who and BBC News
- 2010 Collaborates with Masha Ma in an art-fashion crossover installation at the Get It Louder art bienalle in Beijing.
- 2014 – Rebrands Research Studios as Brody Associates
- 2015 – Designs custom typefaces Chadwick and Horseferry for Channel 4
- 2018 – Designs The Coca-Cola Company's first ever own-brand typeface: TCCC Unity

== Accomplishments ==
- Design for Tribeca Issey Miyake in New York with Frank Gehry
- Major contributor to FUSE, an influential publication on experimental typography
- London's Victoria & Albert Museum hosted an exhibition of Brody's work
- D&AD President's Award 2011

== Fonts by Brody ==
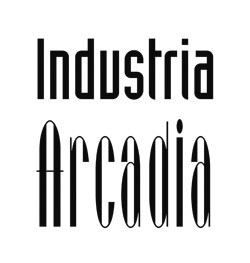

Brody has designed 23 font families, including:

- AG RetroFuture
- Arcadia
- FF Autotrace
- FF Blur
- BF Bonn
- BF Buffalo
- FF Dirty 1
- FF Dirty 2
- FF Dirty 3
- FF Dirty 4
- FF Dirty 6
- FF Dirty 6.9
- FF Dirty 7
- FF Dirty 7.2
- FF Dirty 7.9
- FF Dome
- FF Gothic
- FF Harlem
- Industria
- Insignia
- FF Meta Subnormal
- FF Pop
- FF Tokyo
- FF Typeface 4
- FF Typeface 6 & 7
- FF Tyson
- FF World

== Bibliography ==
- The Graphic Language of Neville Brody, Jon Wozencroft (1988) ISBN 0-500-27496-7
- The Graphic Language of Neville Brody 2, Jon Wozencroft (1994) ISBN 0-500-27770-2
- The Graphic Language of Neville Brody 3, Adrian Shaughnessy (2023) ISBN 0500295263
