= High Holy Disco Mass =

Single by Clock DVA

- Cover of the 12" single

Single by Clock DVA
- B-side: "High Holy Disco Mass (Dance Macabre)" "The Voice That Speaks From Within (Triumph Over Will) Part 1"
- Released: 2 November 1982
- Recorded: July 1982
- Genre: Dance; disco
- Length: 3:56
- Label: Polydor
- Producers: Mark Arthurworry; Clock DVA

Clock DVA singles chronology
"4 Hours" (1981)	"High Holy Disco Mass" (1982)	"Resistance" (1983)

"High Holy Disco Mass" is a single by the English post-punk band Clock DVA. It was released by Polydor Records in 1982 as a follow-up to their EP Passions Still Aflame.

The single's B-sides are "High Holy Disco Mass (Dance Macabre)" and "The Voice That Speaks From Within (Triumph Over Will) Part 1".

== Critical reception ==
Contemporary reviews of "High Holy Disco Mass" were generally negative. Steve Kitson, writing for the Telegraph & Argus, called the single "repetitive". John Mahoney, also writing for the newspaper, considered the song tedious and criticized its horn section. Michelle Noach of The Rocket described "High Holy Disco Mass" as "no great feat of daring" but added: "I rest much faith on them to come up with the goods when their time comes (it will)".

== Formats and track listing ==
UK 7" single

1. "High Holy Disco Mass" – 3:56
2. "The Voice That Speaks From Within (Triumph Over Will) Part 1" – 4:46

UK 12" single

1. "High Holy Disco Mass" – 6:06
2. "High Holy Disco Mass (Dance Macabre)" – 6:09
3. "The Voice That Speaks From Within (Triumph Over Will) Part 1" – 4:46

== Personnel ==
Personnel adapted from the single's sleeve.

- Mark Arthurworry and Clock DVA – production
- Beggar and Co – special thanks (brass instruments)
- Adi Newton and Ignazio Falconetti – initial front cover concept
- Peter Barrett – design
- Peter Care – painting and photography

== Release history ==
Region	Date	Label	Format	Catalog
United Kingdom	1982	Polydor	7", 12"	POSP 499
