= Tactical Neural Implant =

1992 album

Studio album by Front Line Assembly
- Released: April 28, 1992
- Recorded: November – December 1991, Creation Studios, Vancouver, B.C.
- Genre: Electro-industrial, industrial dance
- Length: 44:57; 63:25 (Japanese edition)
- Label: Third Mind, Apollon International, Roadrunner
- Producer: Front Line Assembly

Front Line Assembly chronology
Caustic Grip (1990)	Tactical Neural Implant (1992)	Millennium (1994)

Singles from Tactical Neural Implant
- 1. "Mindphaser" Released: April 7, 1992; 2. "The Blade" Released: July 13, 1992

Tactical Neural Implant is the sixth full-length studio album by electro-industrial band Front Line Assembly. Third Mind Records originally released it in 1992 on both compact disc and LP formats. The album has also been issued by Roadrunner in a two-disc set that includes the Millennium album.

The album contains what some reviewers regard as some of Front Line Assembly's best songs, including the singles "The Blade" and "Mindphaser". The album still receives heavy play in industrial and electronic music dance clubs and is considered "a classic among clubgoers, DJs, and musicians even now."

== Musical style and writing ==
Tactical Neural Implant veers away from the more abrasive elements found on the Caustic Grip album. Vocals, while heavily effected, are often paired with vocoders and more melodic elements of which can be heard on the drum and bass opening of "The Blade", the latter parts of "Bio Mechanic" and the overall composition of "Lifeline". Like on earlier releases, Front Line Assembly worked with multi-layered samples.

Tactical Neural Implant is an example how the band's side projects influence the writing of Front Line Assembly songs. "We got some ideas for FLA songs during the Intermix sessions, for example, 'Outcast'", said Rhys Fulber to Electric Shock Treatment magazine. "We keep everything separate because we want to keep the visions of each separate", he continued, "It's nice to work on a bunch of things and then do a new FLA album. [...] It keeps us interested [...] I think you can grow musically during a short period of time if you do lots of different things. [...] On the FLA album we were spending six hours a day at least on it."

=== "Mindphaser" ===
"Mindphaser" was the first single taken from Tactical Neural Implant. The single was released April 7, 1992, on Third Mind. It includes two versions of the title track and the tracks "Toxic" and "Mutilate" that were also released as bonus tracks on the Japanese edition of the album. A promotional music video for "Mindphaser" won Best Alternative Video at MuchMusic's 1992 Canadian Music Video Awards. The award-winning video was directed by Robert Lee and produced by Gary Blair Smith and took two months to make. The video depicts Front Line Assembly inserted into clips of the Japanese science fiction film Gunhed. The Japanese film company let Front Line Assembly use any footage of the film in exchange for the right to use any changes the band would make for themselves. The video also received airplay on MTV. "Mindphaser" was voted the sixth greatest industrial song of all time by COMA Music Magazine in their feature article "101 Greatest Industrial Songs of All Time".

After having won the award, Front Line Assembly shed some light on the production of the video on MuchMusic. Bill Leeb considered their approach to writing to be quite unconventional. "I was shown some footage first", said Leeb, "we actually wrote the song to the footage. Also the lyrics were written to the footage." "There was a lot of brainstorming between us and the people involved in the video", added Rhys Fulber. According to the band it was rather the images than the actual plot of the film the video clip is based on that inspired writing. "The actual storyline is kind of hard to follow because it's all in Japanese obviously", Fulber explained. Although "even just visually it's hard to follow [...] it's just the imagery we found quite amazing." Leeb commented on concerns that the imagery might push the music into the background. "A lot of times videos actually wreck songs" by pushing the listener in a direction, he said. In contrast, "this way it worked hand in hand really well."

Lyrically, "Mindphaser" is an example of what S. Alexander Reed calls Front Line Assembly's many references to "industrial music's intellectual heritage". "Mindphaser" borrows a few lyrics from industrial band Clock DVA's song "The Hacker", which appeared on their 1989 album Buried Dreams.

The single was re-released in 1998 through Zoth Ommog on the compilation album The Singles: Four Fit.

=== "The Blade" ===
"The Blade", the second single from the album, was released through Third Mind in two versions with different artwork. The North American version contains four tracks, namely two versions of "The Blade" and non-album tracks "Re-Animate" and "Laughing Pain". The European version is an eight-track single and features the songs of the North American version along with two additional remixes of "The Blade" and additional non-album tracks "Target" and "Heatwave". "Laughing Pain" is featured on the soundtrack of 1999 American horror film The Blair Witch Project. "The Blade (Technohead)" made it on the list of the favourite dance remixes of music magazine The Quietus in 2014.

== Release ==
Tactical Neural Implant sold more than 70,000 copies. It was the first Front Line Assembly album to be officially released in Japan.

In October 2019, Canadian label Artoffact started a crowdfunding campaign in order to obtain the album licenses and to re-release the album on vinyl on May 4, 2020.

In 2022, American independent record label Wax Trax! Records issued a 30th anniversary edition of the album on vinyl that was remastered by Greg Reely.

== Critical reception ==
Professional ratings
Review scores
Source	Rating
AllMusic	4.5/5 stars
Billboard	Favorable
Industrial Strength	Favorable
Jersey Beat	5/5 stars
Melody Maker	Favorable
Music from the Empty Quarter	Favorable
Select	4/5 medals
Technology Works	Favorable

Tactical Neural Implant is widely viewed as one of Front Line Assembly's best releases. Theo Kavadias of AllMusic said, "Front Line Assembly, one of the premiere electro-industrial acts, has done much to help define what the genre is about. Tactical Neural Implant is one of the releases which has contributed most to this claim, setting a standard with its cool, calm, and collected electronic harmonies and driving bass." Billboard wrote, "Wisely, the act keeps the beats heavy, while continuing to explore loosely structured melodies and dark lyrical interludes." The song "Mindphaser" was ranked No. 6 on COMA Music Magazine's 101 Greatest Industrial Songs of All Time. Bill Leeb said the video for the song was the only one by the band to receive regular airplay on MTV. The blog io9 ranked Tactical Neural Implant among the "100 albums every science fiction and fantasy fan should listen to".

== Track listing ==
All tracks are written by Bill Leeb and Rhys Fulber.

No.	Title	Length
1.	"Final Impact"	6:02
2.	"The Blade"	5:53
3.	"Mindphaser"	5:04
4.	"Remorse"	5:44
5.	"Bio-Mechanic"	5:26
6.	"Outcast"	5:22
7.	"Gun"	6:19
8.	"Lifeline"	5:07

Japanese bonus tracks
No.	Title	Length
9.	"Toxic"	6:03
10.	"Mutilate"	5:42
11.	"Mindphaser (12" version)"	6:43

== Personnel ==
=== Front Line Assembly ===
- Bill Leeb – production, keyboards, vocals
- Rhys Fulber – production, programming, keyboards

=== Technical personnel ===
- Greg Reely – engineering, additional production
- Mike Landolt – assistant engineering
- Dave Coppenhall – artwork, design
- Brian Williams – photography
