= Resistance (Clock DVA song) =

- Cover of the 12" single

Single by Clock DVA

from the album Advantage
- B-side: "The Secret Life of the Big Black Suit (Instrumental) The Suit Walks On (Size 12)"
- Released: April 1983
- Length: 3:50
- Label: Polydor
- Songwriters: Browse, Carruthers, Dennis, Newton, Sanderson
- Producer: Hugh Jones

Clock DVA singles chronology
"High Holy Disco Mass" (1982)	"Resistance" (1983)	"Breakdown" (1983)

"Resistance" is a song by the English post-punk band Clock DVA. It was the first single released in support of their third studio album, Advantage (1983).

A music video was also released for "Resistance" in 1983.

== Critical reception ==
Martin Hebbert of the Black Country Evening Mail called "Resistance" a "dynamic track" with a "snappy dance floor beat", in an otherwise unenthusiastic review of Advantage. M.C. of the Burton Mail described the track as "electronic dance music for the 1940s" that would "have Humphrey Bogart tripping the light fantastic".

== Formats and track listing ==
UK 7" single

1. "Resistance" – 3:50
2. "The Secret Life of the Big Black Suit (Instrumental) The Suit Walks On (Size 12)" – 3:35

UK 12" single

1. "Resistance" (extended version) – 5:50
2. "The Secret Life of the Big Black Suit (Instrumental) The Suit Walks On (Size 12)" – 3:35

== Personnel ==
Personnel adapted from the single and album's liner notes.

Clock DVA

- Paul Browse – saxophone
- John Valentine Carruthers – guitar
- Dean Dennis – bass guitar
- Adi Newton – vocals, trumpet, and sleeve concept
- Nick Sanderson – drums and percussion

Production and additional personnel

- Peter Anderson – photography
- Peter Barrett – sleeve design
- Peter Care – lighting
- Hugh Jones – producer and engineer

== Release history ==
Region	Date	Label	Format	Catalog
United Kingdom	1983	Polydor	7", 12"	POSP 578
