= Fender Starcaster =

Semi-hollowbody electric guitar series

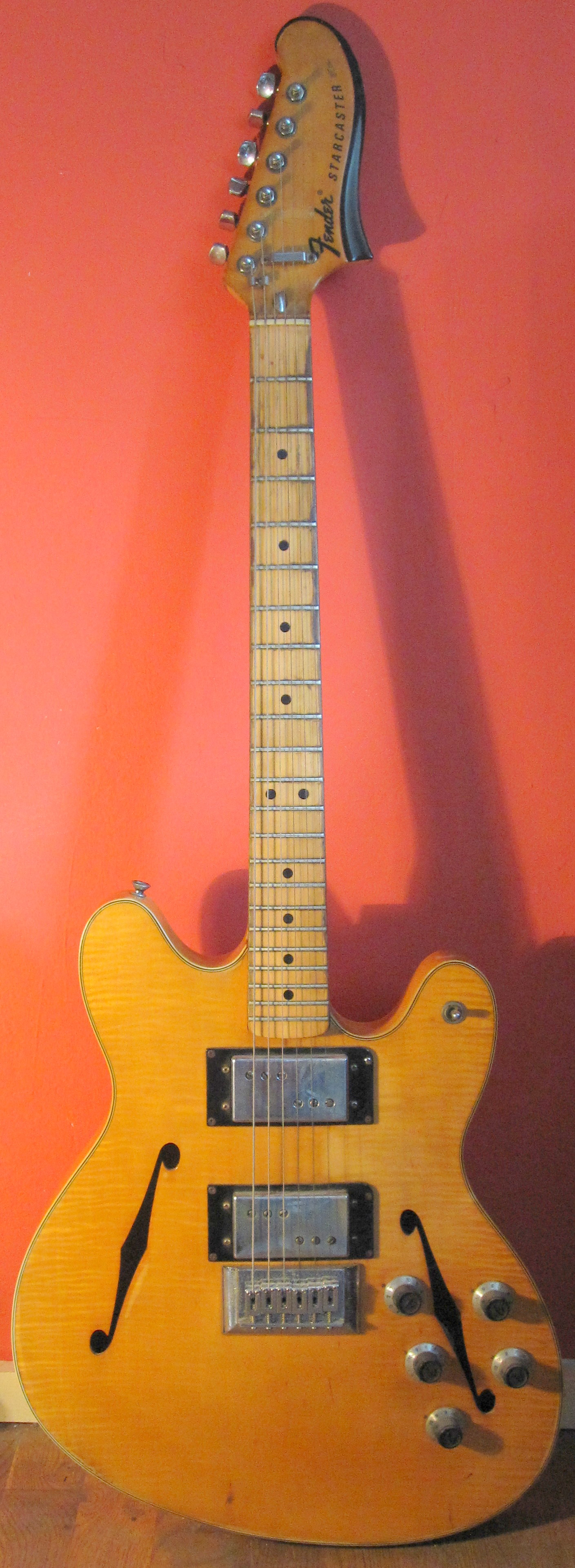
- Manufacturer: Fender
- Period: 1976–1982, 2013–present

Construction
- Body type: Semi-hollow
- Neck joint: Bolt-on neck
- Scale: 25.5"

Woods
- Body: Maple
- Neck: Maple
- Fretboard: Maple

Hardware
- Bridge: Fixed
- Pickup: H–H: Fender Wide Range

Colors available
- White, Natural, Sunburst, Walnut & Black

The Fender Starcaster is a series of semi-hollowbody electric guitars made by the Fender company. The Starcaster was part of Fender's attempt to enter the semi-hollowbody market, which was dominated by Gibson's ES-335 and similar designs.

== History ==
The Starcaster was designed by Gene Fields to be a high quality instrument, although it was manufactured at a time when Fender's standards had lowered considerably. Unlike most semi-hollow guitars which had their necks set in the bodies in the traditional style, the Starcaster retained Fender's bolt-on neck design, which at the time, used a three-bolt joint.

The Starcaster was in production from 1976 to 1982. However, an advertisement from 1977 states that the Starcaster's first creation was in 1975.

=== Re-use of Starcaster name ===
The Starcaster name was revived for a range of "value-priced" Starcaster by Fender guitars, basses, and drums unrelated to the Starcaster of the 1970s. The guitars were usually the same shape as Fender's Stratocaster and the bass the same shape as the Fender Jazz Bass. This line was discontinued by 2014.

=== Reissues ===
In September of 2013, Fender reissued the Starcaster in continuation of its 2011 "Modern Player" series. The new version, offered in black, natural or aged cherryburst, closely resembles the original guitar but lacks some key features including the master volume control, string-through-body bridge, string tree for four strings, bullet truss rod adjuster and three-bolt neck attachment. Unlike the original from the 1970s, the new guitar features a tune-o-matic bridge with a stop tailpiece and bound f-holes.

Fender also released a bass version of the Starcaster, an instrument that was never released, although at least three prototypes were created in the mid 1970s. It was reissued in 2014 before being discontinued in 2016.

The name "Starcaster Bass" is purely speculative as the existing prototypes have only the name Fender on the headstock, a feature which the reissue version retained.

In 2019, Starcasters under the Fender name were no longer produced and were instead rereleased under the Squier brand, with three different versions - the Classic Vibe, Affinity and Contemporary. The Classic Vibe retained the same features as the 2013 rerelease while the Affinity model featured standard PAF style humbuckers and a satin neck with no headstock paint. The Contemporary version lacked F-holes and featured active pickups, a matching headstock, and a satin neck. Later Contemporary models featured a carved neck heel and a roasted maple neck.

Since 2024, the Affinity version was replaced by the Deluxe Affinity model while Contemporary Starcasters were discontinued outright. Deluxe Affinity Starcasters feature a CBS style headstock with either an entirely maple neck, or one with an Indian Laurel fretboard.

Also in 2024, the Starcaster name would be released under the Fender brand once again with the release of the Tom DeLonge signature model. This version lacks a neck humbucker and has a sole bridge humbucker, a Seymour Duncan SH-5, which is connected to a single one volume control.

== Construction ==
The Starcaster has a unique headstock design, with a black bottom curve. No other production Fender guitar before or since had the same headstock, but some prototypes of the Fender Marauder, also designed by Fields, had a similar headstock design. It is also unusual for a semi-hollow guitar in having an asymmetrical ("offset") body, a maple fretboard, a bolt-on neck, a novel control configuration consisting of a volume and tone control for each pickup as well as a master volume control, and Fender's traditional six-on-a-side tuning pegs.

== Popularity and usage ==
The Starcaster was commercially unsuccessful, perhaps because of a public notion that Fender was a "solid-body, single coil brand" and Gibson was the "semi-hollow, humbucker brand". As a result, Starcasters are very rare, but are worth less in today's vintage market than many other semi-hollow guitars from the same period to collectors because of their unpopularity and lack of name endorsers at their time of manufacture.

The most prominent player to use the original 1970s Starcaster was Leo Nocentelli of The Meters. In the United Kingdom, the official launch was headlined by Big Jim Sullivan. He headlined a band of session musicians specially commissioned for the launch and invited audience members to play and review the Starcaster.

Claydes Charles Smith of Kool and the Gang can be seen using one in the video for "Celebration".

Jonny Greenwood, guitarist of Radiohead, can frequently be seen playing a Starcaster on stage. Sammy James, Jr., guitarist and front man of the Mooney Suzuki, uses a natural finished one and appeared on Late Night with Conan O'Brien with it on June 21, 2007. The guitar can also be seen in the music video to Morrissey's single "You Have Killed Me". Dave Keuning of The Killers also started using one shortly before the release of the album Sam's Town. He could be seen playing his Starcaster during The Killers' headline slot at Glastonbury Festival 2007, on Later... with Jools Holland for "Read My Mind" and in the videos for "For Reasons Unknown" and "Human". Scott McMicken of Dr. Dog employs the Starcaster as one of his main guitars, along with an Epiphone Sheraton II and a Gibson ES-335.

Trey Anastasio of Phish plays a custom Languedoc guitar based on the Starcaster. Arctic Monkeys guitarist Jamie Cook can be seen playing one at the 2009 Reading Festival and in the video for the 2009 single "Crying Lightning". Chris Walla of Death Cab For Cutie has occasionally used a Starcaster live. As mentioned on the Roderick on the Line podcast, John Roderick of The Long Winters owned and played a Starcaster. Mark Hempe of the New Orleans–based funk quintet Earphunk played a starcaster at the 2016 Major Rager in Augusta, Ga. British rock band Royal Blood's Mike Kerr is often seen using either a black or custom-made white Starcaster Bass in various music videos and tours.

In 2022, Blink-182 and Angels & Airwaves guitarist/vocalist Tom DeLonge began using Starcasters upon his return to Blink-182, switching from Gibson. Like DeLonge's previous signature models, the guitar consists of a single Seymour Duncan SH-5 Custom pickup humbucker in the bridge position, and one volume knob. Fender announced Artist Series versions of DeLonge's custom Starcasters in April 2024.
