= Thirst (Clock DVA album) =

Studio album by Clock DVA
- Released: 24 January 1981
- Recorded: Jacobs Studios (Surrey, UK)
- Genres: Post-punk, art punk, industrial
- Length: 44:14
- Label: Fetish
- Producers: Adi Newton, Ken Thomas

Clock DVA chronology
White Souls in Black Suits (1980)	Thirst (1981)	Passions Still Aflame (1982)

Professional ratings
Review scores
Source	Rating
AllMusic	4/5 stars

Thirst is the second studio album by English post-punk band Clock DVA. It was released on 24 January 1981, through record label Fetish. Soon after the album's release, this incarnation of the band would split up, with several members going on to form The Box with singer Peter Hope.

== Background ==
Thirst is one of the group's more experimental efforts, showcasing a mix of post-punk, jazz, musique concrète and avant-garde industrial experimentation.

== Track listing ==
All lyrics are written by Adi Newton; all music is composed by Clock DVA (Newton, Steven James Turner, Roger Quail, Paul Widger, Charlie Collins).

Side A
No.	Title	Length
1.	"Uncertain"	7:04
2.	"Sensorium"	2:38
3.	"White Cell"	4:38
4.	"Piano Pain"	3:15
5.	"Blue Tone"	5:57

Side B
No.	Title	Length
1.	"North Loop"	4:50
2.	"4 Hours"	4:00
3.	"Moments"	6:25
4.	"Impressions of African Winter"	5:26

CD issue bonus tracks
No.	Title	Length
10.	"4 Hours" (Remix)	4:48
11.	"Sensorium" (Remix)	3:21

2026 remaster edition bonus tracks
No.	Title	Length
10.	"The Opening" (Live at the Lyceum)	5:47
11.	"Remain Remain" (Live at the Lyceum)	2:46
12.	"4 Hours" (Single mix)	3:52
13.	"Sensorium" (Single mix)	2:39
14.	"4 Hours" (DVATION 2026 version)	4:00
15.	"Sensorium" (DVATION 2026 version)	8:24

== Release ==
Thirst topped the NME Indie Charts upon its release.

== Charts ==
=== Weekly charts ===
Chart (1981)	Peak position
UK Indie Chart	7

Chart performance
Chart (2026)	Peak position
Croatian International Albums (HDU)	37

== Personnel ==
Adapted from the Thirst liner notes.

Clock DVA

- Adi Newton – vocals, clarinet, tape, production
- Turner (Steven James Turner) – bass guitar
- Roger Quail – drums
- Paul Widger – guitar
- Charlie Collins – saxophone, flute

Production and additional personnel

- Ken Thomas – engineering, production
- Jonz – mastering
- Genesis P-Orridge – album liner notes
- Neville Brody – sleeve design

== Release history ==
Region	Date	Label	Format	Catalog
United Kingdom	1981	Fetish	LP	FR2002
Italy	1992	Contempo	CD, CS	CONTE 192
