= Seven Songs (album) =

Studio album by 23 Skidoo
- Released: 1982
- Studio: Jacobs Studios, Farnham, Surrey
- Genre: Post-punk, experimental, world music
- Label: Fetish
- Producer: Tony, Terry & David (Genesis Breyer P-Orridge, Ken Thomas, Peter Christopherson)

23 Skidoo chronology
Seven Songs (1982)	The Culling Is Coming (1983)

Seven Songs is the debut studio album by English band 23 Skidoo, released in 1982 by record label Fetish.

== Reception ==
Professional ratings
Review scores
Source	Rating
AllMusic	4.5/5 stars
Sounds	4/5 stars
Trouser Press	favourable

AllMusic called it "post-punk at its most invigorating and terrifying." Trouser Press called it "a near-brilliant fusion of funk, tape tricks and African percussion".

== Track listing ==
1. "Kundalini"
2. "Vegas El Bandito"
3. "Mary's Operation"
4. "Lock Groove"
5. "New Testament"
6. "IY"
7. "Porno Base"
8. "Quiet Pillage"
9. "Untitled"
