= Collective (disambiguation) =

A collective is a group whose members share a common interest or goal.

Collective or The Collective may also refer to:

== Organizations ==
- The Ayn Rand Collective or "The Collective"
- Camden Collective, a London-based regeneration project
- The Collective (company), an American video game developer

== Film and television ==
- "Collective" (Law & Order: Criminal Intent), 2005 episode
- "Collective" (Star Trek: Voyager), 2000 episode
- The Collective (2008 film), an American independent horror movie
- The Collective (2023 film), an American action film
- Collective (2019 film), a Romanian documentary film

== Music ==
- The Collective (band), an Australian boy band
- The Collective, a British charity supergroup who recorded a cover of Massive Attack's "Teardrop"

=== Albums ===
- Collective (Clock DVA album), 1994
- Collective (I've album), 2005
- Collective (Stavesacre album), 2001
- The Collective (Cecil Brooks III album), 1979
- The Collective (Scale the Summit album), 2011
- The Collective (The Collective album), 2012
- The Collective (Kim Gordon album), 2024

== Other uses ==
- Collective Man, a Chinese superhero comics character
- The Collective (comics), a mutant comics character
- Collective (BBC), a now-dormant online interactive culture magazine hosted by bbc.co.uk
- Collective, one of the helicopter flight controls

== See also ==
- Colectivo (disambiguation) for the Spanish term
