= 400 Blows =

400 Blows or Les quatre cents coups may refer to:

- The 400 Blows (Les quatre cents coups), a film by François Truffaut
- Les 400 coups (publisher), a Canadian a French-language publisher of books for children
- 400 Blows (Los Angeles band)
- 400 Blows (British band)
