= Colectivo (disambiguation) =

El colectivo or colectivo, Spanish for "collective", may refer to:

== Buses ==
- Colectivo, the name for a bus in Argentina (the term also spread to the rest of South America)
- Colectivo 60, a bus route in Buenos Aires, Argentina
- Colectivo 64, a bus route in Buenos Aires, Argentina

== Organizations ==
- Colectivo (Venezuela), a Venezuelan far-left paramilitary group
- Colectivos de Jóvenes Comunistas, a Spanish youth organization affiliated to the Communist Party of the Peoples of Spain (PCPE)
- Colectivo Comunista 22 de marzo, a separatist political party in Galicia, Spain
- Colectivo Socialista, a Galician political organization that was part of the Galician Nationalist Bloc (BNG)

== Companies ==
- Colectivo Coffee Roasters, a coffee roaster based in Milwaukee, Wisconsin

== See also ==
- Collective (disambiguation)
