= Jamie Morgan =

Jamie Morgan may refer to:

- Jamie Morgan (tennis) (born 1971), former Australian professional tennis player
- Jamie Morgan (musician), British musician and photographer
