= 4 Hours =

- Fetish 1981 7" sleeve by Neville Brody

Single by Clock DVA

from the album Thirst
- B-side: "Sensorium" (remix)
- Released: 4 June 1981
- Recorded: Jacobs Studios (Surrey, UK)
- Genre: Post-punk, industrial
- Length: 4:00
- Label: Fetish
- Songwriter(s): Charlie Collins, Adi Newton, Roger Quail, David Tyme
- Producer(s): Clock DVA, Ken Thomas

Clock DVA singles chronology
"4 Hours" (1981)	"Breakdown" (1983)

"4 Hours" is a song by the English post-punk band Clock DVA. It is the only single released in support of their second album Thirst.

== Formats and track listing ==
UK 7" single (FET 008)

1. "4 Hours" (Charlie Collins, Adi Newton, Roger Quail, David Tyme) – 4:00
2. "Sensorium" (Charlie Collins, Adi Newton, Roger Quail, Steven James Turner, Paul Widger) – 2:48

== Accolades ==
Year	Publication	Country	Accolade	Rank
1981	The Face	United Kingdom	Singles of the Year	*
1981	Rockerilla	Italy	Singles of the Year	31
1992	NME	United Kingdom	100 Best Indie Singles Ever	*
2006	Blow Up	Italy	100 Songs to Remember	40

(*) designates unordered lists.

== Personnel ==
From the "4 Hours" sleeve and label notes.

Clock DVA

- Adi Newton – vocals, clarinet, tape, production
- Turner (Steven James Turner) – bass guitar
- Roger Quail – drums
- Paul Widger – guitar
- Charlie Collins – saxophone, flute

Production and additional personnel

- Ken Thomas – engineering, production
- Jonz – mastering
- Neville Brody – sleeve design

== Charts ==
Chart (1981)	Peak position
UK Indie Chart	32

== Release history ==
Region	Date	Label	Format	Catalog
United Kingdom	1981	Fetish	7"	FET 008
United Kingdom	1985	Doublevision	12"	DVR 18
Italy	1992	Contempo	12"	Tempo 192
