= Transitional Voices =

Live album by Clock DVA
- Released: 1990
- Recorded: 1990 in Bologna, Italy
- Genre: Industrial
- Length: 35:46
- Label: Interfisch

Clock DVA chronology
Buried Dreams (1989)	Transitional Voices (1990)	Man-Amplified (1991)

Professional ratings
Review scores
Source	Rating
AllMusic	3/5 stars

Transitional Voices is a live album by Clock DVA, released in 1990 by Interfisch Records. It was recorded in 1990 in Bologna, Italy, during their European tour.

== Track listing ==
No.	Title	Writer(s)	Length
1.	"Transitional Voices"	Robert Baker, Dean Dennis, Adi Newton	6:29
2.	"Sound Mirror"	Paul Browse, Dean Dennis, Adi Newton	5:49
3.	"Syntactic"	Robert Baker, Dean Dennis, Adi Newton	6:13
4.	"N.Y.C. Overload"	Robert Baker, Dean Dennis, Adi Newton	5:11
5.	"Fractal 9"	Robert Baker, Dean Dennis, Adi Newton	6:14
6.	"Technogeist"	Robert Baker, Dean Dennis, Adi Newton	5:50

== Personnel ==
Adapted from the Transitional Voices liner notes.

Clock DVA

- Robert Baker – instruments
- Dean Dennis – instruments
- Adi Newton – instruments, vocals

Production and additional personnel

- Michael Bulgrin – design
- Andrew McKenzie – engineering, mixing

== Release history ==
Region	Date	Label	Format	Catalog
Germany	1990	Interfisch	CD, LP	IF-SETH 018
