= Sign (Clock DVA album) =

Studio album by Clock DVA
- Released: 3 August 1993
- Recorded: Anterior Digital Research Station (Sheffield, UK)
- Genre: EBM
- Length: 48:40
- Label: Contempo

Clock DVA chronology
Digital Soundtracks (1992)	Sign (1993)	Collective (1994)

Professional ratings
Review scores
Source	Rating
AllMusic	3.5/5 stars

Sign is the seventh studio album by Clock DVA, released on 3 August 1993 by Contempo Records.

== Track listing ==
All tracks are written by Robert Baker and Adi Newton.

No.	Title	Length
1.	"Signal"	3:47
2.	"Voice Recognition Test"	5:57
3.	"The Obsession Intensifies"	5:32
4.	"Two Souls"	4:22
5.	"Re-Entry"	5:57
6.	"Pool of Shades"	6:43
7.	"Return to Blue"	6:14
8.	"Eternity"	4:41
9.	"Sign"	5:27

== Personnel ==
Adapted from the Sign liner notes.

Clock DVA

- Robert Baker – instruments
- Adi Newton – instruments, vocals

== Release history ==
Region	Date	Label	Format	Catalog
Italy	1993	Contempo	CD, CS, LP	CONTE 225
