= Breakdown (Clock DVA song) =

Single by Clock DVA

from the album Advantage
- B-side: "Black Angel's Death Song"
- Released: 1983
- Recorded: Fall 1982 at Rockfield Studios (Wales, UK)
- Length: 3:48
- Label: Polydor/Relativity
- Songwriters: Paul Browse; Carruthers; Dean Dennis; Adi Newton; Nick Sanderson
- Producer: Hugh Jones

Clock DVA singles chronology
"Resistance" (1983)	"Breakdown" (1983)	"The Hacker" (1988)

"Breakdown" is a song by the English post-punk band Clock DVA. It was the second single released in support of their third album Advantage.

== Formats and track listing ==
All lyrics written by Adi Newton; all music composed by Clock DVA, except "Black Angel's Death Song" by Lou Reed and John Cale.

UK 7" single (POSP 627)

1. "Breakdown" – 3:48
2. "Black Angel's Death Song" (The Velvet Underground cover) – 3:22

UK 12" single (EMC 1206)

1. "Breakdown" (extended version) – 5:47
2. "Breakdown" – 3:50
3. "Beautiful Losers" – 4:29
4. "Black Angels Death Song" (The Velvet Underground cover) – 3:24

== Accolades ==
Year	Publication	Country	Accolade	Rank
1983	Rockerilla	Italy	Singles of the Year	6

== Personnel ==
Adapted from the Breakdown liner notes.

Clock DVA

- Paul Browse – saxophone
- John Valentine Carruthers – guitar
- Dean Dennis – bass guitar
- Adi Newton – vocals, trumpet
- Nick Sanderson – drums, percussion

Additional musicians

- Katie Kissoon – backing vocals

Production and additional personnel

- Peter Anderson – photography
- Peter Barrett – design
- Hugh Jones – production, engineering, mixing

== Release history ==
Region	Date	Label	Format	Catalog
United Kingdom	1983	Polydor	7", 12"	POSP 627
United States	1983	Relativity	7", 12"	EMC 1206
