= Siiiii =

British goth punk band

- Origin: Sheffield, England
- Genres: Gothic rock, punk rock, post-punk
- Years active: 1983–present
- Label: King Sol
- Members: Paul Devine; Angie Holmes; Mark Holmes; Wayne Furniss
- Website: www.siiiii.co.uk

Siiiii (pronounced 'sigh'), is a British goth punk band formed in Sheffield, England, in 1983, taking their name from the William S. Burroughs novel The Soft Machine.

== Early years ==
Siiiii was formed in the 1983 when singer Paul Devine answered an ad in Melody Maker to join Mark (guitar) and Angie Holmes (bass) of Sheffield bands Fatales and Surface Mutants as well as Wayne Furniss, drummer and guitarist for Pulp. Siiiii quickly became known in the UK goth scene, gigging with influential bands such as Skeletal Family, The March Violets, Inca Babies, and The Chameleons. During this time, Siiiii attracted the attention of Mick Mercer, who was then editor of ZigZag. Mercer wrote favorably of the band and documented them in photographs, which would later appear in his book "Gothic Rock Black Book". Siiiii recorded several tracks and gained favorable reviews for their performances, however, they were unable to attract a label and disbanded in 1986.

Mark Holmes went on to perform and record with The Anti-Group.

== 2005–present ==
In 2005, the band regrouped to compile Ancient, an archival release of demos recorded during the band's initial period of activity. This compilation was released originally on their own King Sol Records label. Following the release of Ancient, Siiiii played the last ever Drop Dead Festival in New York, then followed up with a number of European shows. A live album, Ein Verdammtes Versprechen, was recorded in Germany in 2008 and given a limited release on the band's King Sol Records.

In 2014, Siiiii released Modern, a studio album of new material, recorded in Manchester, Sheffield and Glastonbury.
