= Masha Ma =

Chinese fashion designer

- Born: China
- Education: Central Saint Martins
- Occupation: Fashion designer
- Label: Masha Ma
- Awards: 2011 Short-listed for WGSN “Breakthrough Designer” of the year 2011 Short-listed for Lycra Emerging Talent of the Year; 2010 Best International Innovation Award, CCDC Design Contest; 2010 Best International Innovation Award, CCDC Design Contest; 2009 The Puma CSM Bursary Award; 2009 Best International Innovation Award, CCDC Design Contest; 2008 Chloé’s design competition 2006 Final listed in Lancôme Colour Designs Award
- Website: http://www.masha-ma.com/

Masha Ma is a Chinese fashion designer. Her collections have been featured in leading publications such as Vogue, Elle, Harper's Bazaar, Pop, French Playboy, Cosmopolitan and L'Officiel.

== Career ==
Masha Ma received her M.A. in Women's Wear from Central Saint Martins in 2008. During her studies she was an assistant to well-known designers Veronique Branquinho and Alexander McQueen. Also while in school, Masha's graduate collection was selected and shown at London Fashion Week and subsequently purchased by B store, a retail fashion store in London.

Since graduating Masha has been presenting her AW and SS collections during Fashion Week each year, both in London and Paris. In 2010, Masha collaborated with the British graphic designer Neville Brody on an art-fashion crossover installation for Get It Louder, an influential Chinese art and design bienalle that features both emerging and established artists from China and abroad. She has collaborated with Naomi Campbell, Lane Crawford, among others.

Her designs are known for their futuristic, feminine characteristics, minimalism, use of color white, and industrial and nature influences such as New York City's Meatpacking District and the crystallized formations of snowflakes. In an interview, Masha has characterized her brand as "modern, chic, femininity". Contrary to Chinese standards in the garment industry, Masha imports her fabrics in small orders.

Masha's most recent collection, MASHA MA SS13 "Betta Storm", was shown at Paris Fashion Week during October 2012. It was subsequently sold in Spiga 2, a Milan-based boutique project by Dolce & Gabbana, and Harvey Nichols in Hong Kong and Istanbul.
