= The Anti-Group =

UK musical group

The Anti-Group Communications
- Also known as: T.A.G.C.
- Origin: Sheffield, England
- Genres: Industrial, ambient, electroacoustic
- Years active: 1984–1996, 2009–present
- Labels: Anterior Research Recordings, Sweatbox, Big Sex, Side Effects
- Spinoff of: Clock DVA
- Members: Adi Newton
- Past members: Robert E. Baker; M. Banks; P.H. Barke; Ant Bennett; Justin Bennett; Dean Dennis; Darrell Fitzgerald D'Silva; Robert Gordon; Barry Harden; David Heppenstall; Mark Holmes; Oskar M; D. Nicholson

The Anti-Group Communications (often referred to as The Anti-Group or T.A.G.C.) is an open-membership collaborative art and information project formed in 1978 by Adi Newton and Steven Turner. The T.A.G.C. acronym refers to the four different types of DNA Nucleotide: thymine, adenine, guanine, and cytosine. The group's main objective was to combine interactive and mixed media art, installations, and research on psycho acoustics and philosophical concepts to produce fascinating presentations. Although the group disbanded in 1996, Newton continued the project with CD releases and live performances in 2009.

T.A.G.C. audio recordings are released on Newton's Anterior Research Recordings label. The psychoacoustic experiments and carefully constructed aural rituals are usually accompanied by lengthy liner notes, explaining the theoretical underpinnings of the recordings. In this way, T.A.G.C. presents itself explicitly as acoustic research rather than music.

== Discography ==
- 1985 – The Delivery - Atonal Records LP ST3006
- 1985 – Ha/Zulu - Sweatbox 12" SOX009
- 1986 – ShT - Sweatbox 12" SEX010
- 1986 – Digitaria - Sweatbox LP SAX012 / CD SACD012 / Cass SAXC012
- 1987 – Meontological Research Recording - Record 1 - Sweatbox LP SAX013
- 1987 – Big Sex - Sweatbox 12" SOX011 / 7" OX011
- 1988 – Meontological Recordings - Record 2: Teste Tones - Side Effects LP SER12
- 1989 – Broadcast Test - Wax Trax 12" WAX9104 / Big Sex Records 12" Big Sex 002
- 1994 – Burning Water - Anterior Research Recordings CD ARR004 / Side Effects CD DFX17
- 1994 – Iso-Erotic Calibrations - Anterior Research Recordings CD ARR003
- 1994 – Audiophile - Anterior Research Recordings CD ARR001
- 2005 – Psychoegoautocratical Auditory Physiogomy Delineated - Die Stadt maxi-CD DS67 (unofficial release)
- 2018 – OBSOLETE CAPITALISM AND ADI NEWTON / TAG - CHAOS VARIATION III - VINYL 12 / 45 / NURKFM004 [ITA]
- 2018 – Matar / TAG - Sculptures Of Daedalus / Spiritual Psycho synthesis (Flexi, 7", Shape) - Anterior Research Media Comm FX1/FX2
- 2020 – 4 X 12 CD / PERIPHERAL MINIMAL RECORDS / ARMComm / Peripheral Minimal PM27
- 2020 – Organ Needles Limited Edition Box inc 1xUSB card / CD / Anterior Research Media Comm – 005 / USB 02
- 2021 – Meontological Research Recording III - Transmission from the Trans Yuggothian Broadcast Station / Anterior Research Media Comm - Rizosfera/NUKFM - NUBKFM 013 (Book + USB Card)
- 2022 – AMMA / Armcomm Europe / Rizosfera CD
