= Industria (typeface) =

Geometric sans-serif typeface

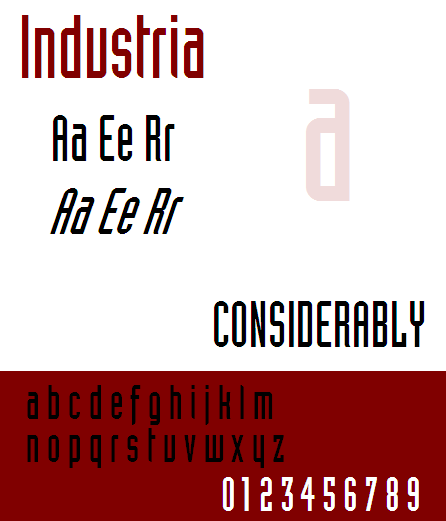
- Category: Sans-serif
- Designer(s): Neville Brody
- Foundry: Linotype
- Date created: 1984
- Date released: 1989

Industria is a sans-serif font designed in 1984 by Neville Brody. It was originally designed for use in The Face magazine. The font features elements of geometric precision. It is licensed by the Linotype type foundry and released publicly in 1989.

In the book 100 Best Typefaces Ever, the Industria font ranked at number 72.

== Usage ==
Industria is used by the NBA's Oklahoma City Thunder as their wordmark as well as in their logo. Industria is also used in the logo for the video game franchise Syphon Filter, by the melodic death metal band Dark Tranquillity, and in the logo for The X-Files. Many sports franchises owned or endorsed by Red Bull GmbH use Industria in their logo to display their location (e.g. New York Red Bulls, Austrian FC Red Bull Salzburg). It is also used in conjunction with Newport Classic to render the SimCity 2000 logo.

Polish music program "30 ton lista, lista przebojów" in Polish Television (TVP2) emitted in 1995–2006 used SolidA

Industria Solid was for a long time the official font of the French Ministry of Education and is used in all its administration's logos.

The font was also used for the S&S Power logo.
