= Digital Soundtracks =

Studio album by Clock DVA
- Released: 11 December 1992
- Recorded: Anterior Digital Research Station (Sheffield, UK)
- Genre: EBM
- Length: 67:47
- Label: Contempo

Clock DVA chronology
Man-Amplified (1991)	Digital Soundtracks (1992)	Sign (1993)

Professional ratings
Review scores
Source	Rating
AllMusic	4/5 stars

Digital Soundtracks is the sixth studio album by Clock DVA, released on 11 December 1992 by Contempo Records. "E-Wave" is dedicated to Klaus Kinski.

== Track listing ==
All tracks are written by Robert Baker, Dean Dennis and Adi Newton.

No.	Title	Length
1.	"The Sensual Engine"	6:26
2.	"Cycom"	4:06
3.	"The Presence"	4:14
4.	"Sound Sweep"	5:55
5.	"Chemical"	6:08
6.	"Delta Machines"	5:09
7.	"Stills of Emotion"	5:19
8.	"The Inversion"	7:13
9.	"The Operators"	6:46
10.	"E-Wave"	4:47
11.	"Diminishing Point"	5:00
12.	"Stations of the Mind"	6:03

== Personnel ==
Adapted from the Digital Soundtracks liner notes.

Clock DVA

- Robert Baker – instruments
- Dean Dennis – instruments
- Adi Newton – instruments

== Release history ==
Region	Date	Label	Format	Catalog
Italy	1992	Contempo	CD, CS, LP	CONTE 217
