= White Souls in Black Suits =

Studio album by Clock DVA
- Released: December 1980
- Recorded: DVAtion Studios (Sheffield, UK)
- Genre: Post-punk, industrial, noise
- Length: 53:04
- Label: Industrial

Clock DVA chronology
White Souls in Black Suits (1980)	Thirst (1981)

Professional ratings
Review scores
Source	Rating
AllMusic	3/5 stars

White Souls in Black Suits is the debut studio album of Clock DVA, released in December 1980 by Industrial Records. It was originally issued only as a cassette, though it was reissued on vinyl (Italy only) and CD.

== Track listing ==
All lyrics are written by Adi Newton; all music is composed by Clock DVA.

Side one
No.	Title	Length
1.	"Consent"	5:00
2.	"Discontentment"	5:56
3.	"Still/Silent"	7:14
4.	"Non"	10:36

Side two
No.	Title	Length
1.	"Relentless"	5:19
2.	"Contradict"	5:11
3.	"(Film Soundtrack Keyboards Assemble Themselves at Dawn)"	8:03
4.	"Anti-Chance"	5:45

== Personnel ==
Adapted from the White Souls in Black Suits liner notes.

Clock DVA

- Charlie Collins – soprano saxophone, alto saxophone, baritone saxophone, sopranino saxophone, flute, percussion, bells
- David James Hammond – guitar
- Roger Quail – percussion
- Adi Newton – vocals, synthesizer, clarinet, bowed guitar
- Steven James Turner – bass guitar

Production and additional personnel

- Richard H. Kirk – mixing (4)
- Stephen Mallinder – mixing (B4)
- Jon Mills – engineering
- Chris Watson – mixing (B4)

== Charts ==
Chart performance for White Souls in Black Suits
Chart (2025)	Peak position
UK Independent Albums Breakers (OCC)	17

== Release history ==
Region	Date	Label	Format	Catalog
United Kingdom	1980	Industrial	CS	IRC 31
Italy	1982	Italy	LP	EX 24
Italy	1990	Contempo	CD, CS, LP	Conte 157
