= Shotgun (Jamie J. Morgan album) =

Studio album by Jamie J. Morgan
- Released: 1990
- Studios: Matrix Studios; Re Maximum Studios; Beethoven; Sarm West; (London, England): Unique; D&D; Electric Lady; (New York City, New York)
- Label: Tabu
- Producers: Nellee Hooper; Cameron McVey; Tim Simenon; DJ Mushroom; Richard Mazda; Gota; Sean Oliver; Phil Chill; Sam Sever; Pete Davies

Professional ratings
Review scores
Source	Rating
AllMusic	3/5 stars

Shotgun is the only studio album by British musician Jamie J. Morgan, released in 1990 on Tabu Records. It includes production by Nellee Hooper, Cameron McVey, Tim Simenon, DJ Mushroom from Massive Attack and Richard Mazda.

== Single releases ==
The album includes a cover of Lou Reed's "Walk on the Wild Side" which was released as a single, reaching number one in New Zealand, number 25 in Australia, number 22 in Ireland and number 27 in the United Kingdom. "Rocksteady" was also released as a single, reaching number 97 in the UK.

== Track listing ==
No.	Title	Writer(s)	Producer(s)	Length
1.	"Shotgun"	Jamie J. Morgan; Bruce Smith; Sean Oliver	Oliver
2.	"Walk on the Wild Side"	Lou Reed	Richard Mazda; Phil Chill; DJ Mushroom
3.	"Could You Be That Girl"	Morgan; Mazda	Tim Simenon
4.	"Third World Man"	Morgan; Mazda	Nellee Hooper
5.	"I'm No Angel"	Morgan; Hooper; Beresford Romeo	Mazda; Gota
6.	"Rocksteady"	Morgan; Mazda	Mazda
7.	"Shame"	Morgan; Mazda	Mazda
8.	"She's on It"	Morgan; Mazda	Hooper
9.	"Mercedes Blue"	Morgan; Cameron McVey; Neneh Cherry; Sam Sever	Sever; Mazda; Gota
10.	"Blind Love"	Morgan; Jon Moss	Mazda
11.	"Gangster Boogie"	Morgan; Mazda	Mazda
12.	"Heaven Can Wait"	Morgan; Oliver	Oliver
13.	"Walk on the Wild Side" (Moralis Mix)	Reed

Note

- Tracks 11–13 available on CD and cassette versions only.

== Personnel ==
Credits adapted from the album's liner notes.

=== Musicians ===
- Joe Crisp – percussion
- DJ Lawrence – backing vocals
- DJ Mushroom – backing vocals
- Finesse & Sinquis – rap (track 2)
- Claudia Fontaine – backing vocals
- Ivor Guest – keyboards
- D. Johnston – drumming
- Pachiri Johnson – percussion
- Jomanda – backing vocals
- Eric Kupper – keyboards
- Richard Mazda – guitar, backing vocals
- Cindy Mizelle – backing vocals
- Sean Oliver – guitar, bass guitar on "Shotgun"
- Lawrence Parry – trumpet
- Paul Pesco – guitar
- P. Scott – keyboards
- Tim Simenon – backing vocals
- Beverley Skeete – backing vocals
- Bruce Smith – drums on "Shotgun"
- Naomi Thompson – backing vocals
- Caron Wheeler – backing vocals
- Fred Wesley – brass

=== Production ===
- Jeremy Allon – mix engineer
- Phil Chill – programming, drum programming, production
- Pete Davies – production
- DJ Mushroom – production
- Gota – programming
- Nigel Green – mixing
- Ivor Guest – programming
- Nellee Hooper – programming, production
- Ascar Key – engineer
- Phil Legg – engineer
- Richard Mazda – programming, drum programming, arranger, mixing, production
- Dennis Mitchell – engineering
- David Morales – remix
- Sean Oliver – programming, production
- Kevin Petri – engineering
- John Poppo – engineering
- Sam Sever – production, programming
- Tim Simenon – programming, production, arranger
- Bruce Smith – programming
- Gary Wilkinson – mixing
- Recorded at Matrix Studios, London; Unique, New York; D&D, New York; Electric Lady, New York; Re Maximum Studios, London; Beethoven, London; Sarm West, London
- Executive producers: Adam Kidron, Julian Woolley
- Mixed at Battery Studios, London
- Photography: Jean-Baptiste Mondino
- Design: Neville Brody, Ian Swift

== Charts ==
Chart performance for Shotgun
Chart (1990)	Peak position
Australian Albums (ARIA)	113
