= Advantage (album) =

Studio album by Clock DVA
- Released: 1983
- Recorded: Fall 1982
- Studio: Rockfield (Rockfield, Wales)
- Genre: Post-punk, industrial
- Length: 40:47
- Label: Polydor
- Producer: Hugh Jones

Clock DVA chronology
Passions Still Aflame (1982)	Advantage (1983)	Buried Dreams (1989)

Professional ratings
Review scores
Source	Rating
AllMusic	4.5/5 stars

Advantage is the third studio album and second LP by Clock DVA, released in 1983 by Polydor Records. Singles from it were "Resistance" and "Breakdown". A video was filmed for "Resistance", directed by Peter Care.

== Track listing ==
All lyrics are written by Adi Newton; all music is composed by Clock DVA.

Side one
No.	Title	Length
1.	"Tortured Heroine"	5:10
2.	"Beautiful Losers"	4:26
3.	"Resistance"	3:50
4.	"Eternity in Paris"	5:49

Side two
No.	Title	Length
1.	"The Secret Life of the Big Black Suit"	3:36
2.	"Breakdown"	4:25
3.	"Dark Encounter"	7:26
4.	"Poem"	6:05

CD issue bonus tracks
No.	Title	Length
9.	"Noises in Limbo"	5:17
10.	"Black Angel's Death Song" (The Velvet Underground cover)	3:22
11.	"Resistance" (12" mix)	5:48
12.	"Breakdown" (12" mix)	5:44

== Personnel ==
Adapted from the Advantage liner notes.

Clock DVA

- Paul Browse – saxophone
- John Valentine Carruthers – guitar
- Dean Dennis – bass guitar
- Adi Newton – vocals, trumpet, piano (B4), design
- Nick Sanderson – drums, percussion

Additional musicians

- David Heppenstall – cello (B4)
- Katie Kissoon – backing vocals (B2, B3)

Production and additional personnel

- Peter Anderson – photography
- Peter Barrett – design
- Hugh Jones – production, engineering, mixing (B4), keyboards

== Release history ==
Region	Date	Label	Format	Catalog
United Kingdom	1983	Polydor	CS, LP	POLS 1082
Germany	1989	Interfisch	CD, LP	SETH 006
Italy	1992	Contempo	CD	CONTE 191
