= The Culling Is Coming =

Studio album by 23 Skidoo
- Released: February 1983
- Recorded: England, Belgium
- Genre: Industrial, gamelan
- Length: 75:48
- Label: Boutique
- Producer: 23 Skidoo & Ken Thomas

23 Skidoo chronology
Seven Songs (1982)	The Culling Is Coming (1983)	Urban Gamelan (1984)

Professional ratings
Review scores
Source	Rating
Allmusic	4/5 stars

The Culling Is Coming is the second studio album by 23 Skidoo, released in 1983.

The first section of the album consists of studio recordings utilizing Gamelan instruments while the second section was an improvised set using metal percussions and tape loops from their appearance at the first WOMAD Festival in July 1982. The third, live section was later added to the Boutique Records version.

== Track listing ==
A Winter Ritual

1. "G-2 Contemplation" – 7:35
2. "S-Matrix" – 3:56
3. "G-3 Insemination" – 3:53
4. "Shrine" – 3:16
5. "Mahakala" – 4:19

A Summer Rite

1. "Banishing" – 4:38
2. "Invocation" – 2:51
3. "Flashing" – 4:50
4. "Stifling" – 1:35
5. "Healing (For the Strong)" – 11:59

An Autumn Journey

1. "Move Back - Bite Harder" – 26:53
