= Get It Louder =

Art festival primarily for young people

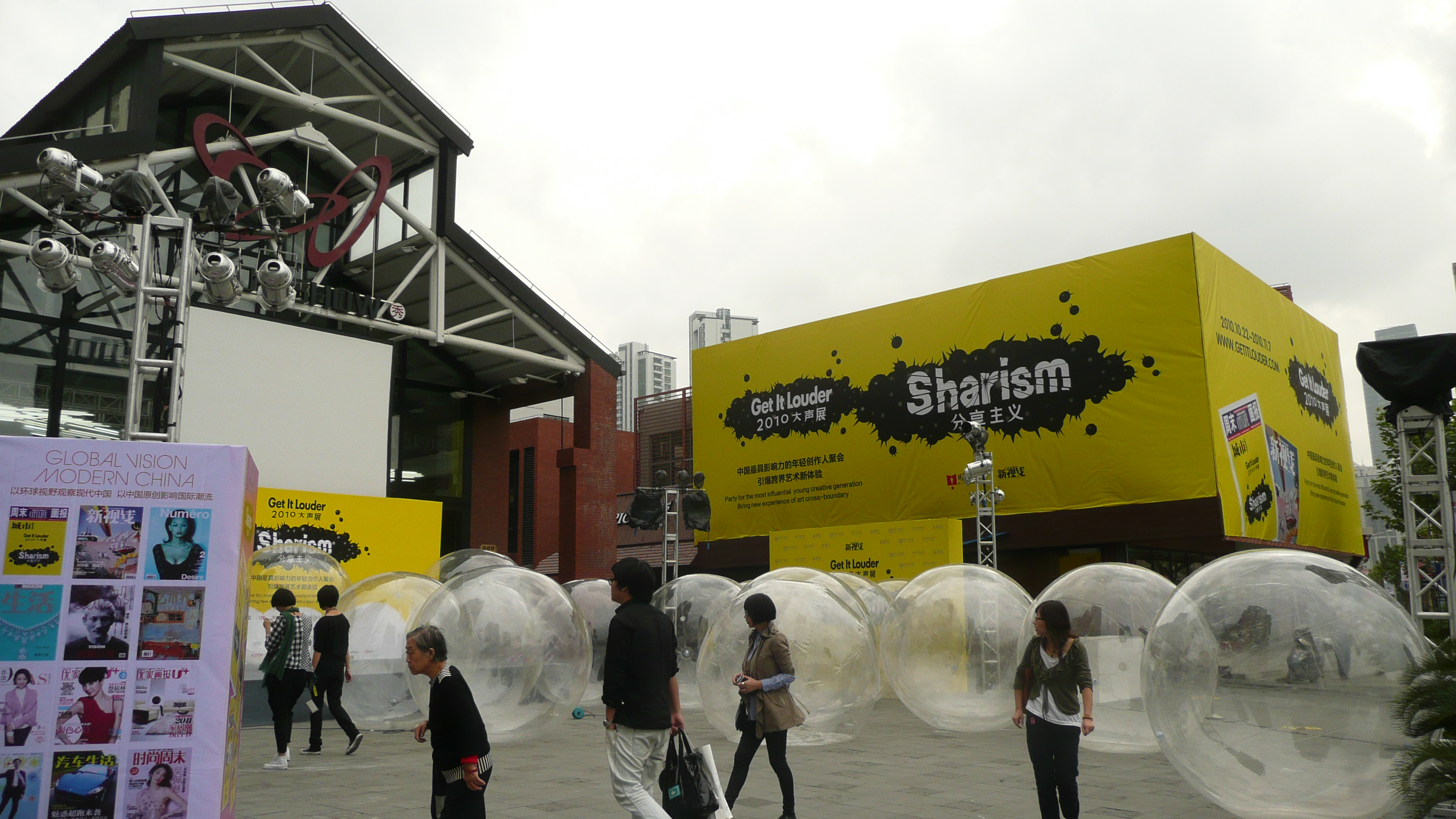
Get It Louder Sharism exhibition in Shanghai (2010)

Get It Louder is a Chinese contemporary art festival that began in 2005 and features exhibitions focusing primarily on young Chinese talent within the spheres of art, architecture, design, literature, film and music. Ou Ning helped launch the project with the help of the agency Modern Media and has served as the biennial's main curator for every year to date except 2012. In an interview, Ou said Get It Louder's inception was meant to showcase young Chinese design talent through a series of traveling exhibitions in Beijing, Shanghai and Guangzhou. "Young" in this case is more connected to being "fresh" and "edgy" than a particular age, one of the reasons the older, established artist Ai Weiwei was included in past exhibitions. International, non-Chinese artists and designers have also played a significant part in Get It Louder's exhibitions.

Sharism was the theme for the 2010 exhibition, which Ou described in the same interview as "originat[ing] from issues of collaboration on Internet space, and explores the increasingly convoluted relationship between public and private realms."

== Exhibition history ==
- 2005: Location: Shanghai; other details unknown
- 2007: details unknown
- 2010: Theme: Sharism; Curator: Ou Ning; Exhibitors: Solid Objectives – Idenburg Liu (SO – IL), International Necronautical Society (Simon Critchley and Tom McCarthy, Neville Brody and Masha Ma, Matt Hope; Location: Beijing / Shanghai; date: September 19 - October 10 (Beijing); October 22 - November 7, 2010 (Shanghai)
- 2012: Theme: Future; Curator(s): Chen Jiaojiao, Peng Yangjun; Location: Beijing; date: November 4-20, 2012
