= Darrell D'Silva =

British actor

Darrell Fitzgerald D'Silva is a British actor, best known for his role as Hendrik Davie in ITV series Van der Valk is notable for his work with the Royal Shakespeare Company.

== Early life and education ==
Darrell Fitzgerald D'Silva was born in Rotherham, South Yorkshire.

D'Silva was part of the 1980s Sheffield music scene, playing with The Anti-Group and Hula before becoming an actor. He graduated from the Drama Centre London.

== Career ==
=== Stage ===
D'Silva first joined the Royal Shakespeare Company (RSC) in 1996 to play Kilroy in Steven Pimlott's production of Tennessee Williams's Camino Real. He has appeared in plays with the company for over 20 years, touring the world, and was made associate artist in 2011.

His work at the Royal National Theatre includes The Rose Tattoo, The Royal Hunt of the Sun, and Closer.

=== Film and television ===
From 1995 to 1996, he was a regular on the BBC crime drama Out of the Blue.

In 2006, he played Johann Lindeman, captain of the Gouverneur Generaal Loudon, a ship that survived the 1883 explosion of Krakatoa in the BBC docudrama Krakatoa: The Last Days.

In 2014, he played Gunnar in Northmen: A Viking Saga.

In 2015, he played Max Scullion in the episode "The Last Man" of Father Brown, and in 2016 he played Geoff Craven in the episode "Prey" of Endeavour, as well as a background role as an unnamed Ironborn in the HBO series Game of Thrones. In 2018, he appeared in three episodes of the six-episode BBC drama miniseries Informer.

In 2020, D'Silva starred as hard drinking, saxophone playing pathologist Hendrik Davie in Company Pictures' relaunch of Van der Valk

In 2021, he played the part of Mike in Guy Ritchie's action thriller Wrath of Man, starring Jason Statham. In the same year, he acted as Piso in the TV series Domina.

In 2026, he is set to star in Toxic, an Indian movie. He plays the character of Salvador as confirmed on a poster shared by the makers of the film on 24th February 2026.

He also starred in a series of short films. Show Pieces was written by Alan Moore and directed by Mitch Jenkins; Jimmy's End and His Heavy Heart were written by Moore as introduction sections to a much larger project planned by Moore and Jenkins called The Show.

=== Awards ===
D'Silva was nominated in 2016 for the Helen Hayes Award for most Outstanding Performance, for his role as Siward in Dunsinane by David Greig.

== Acting credits ==
=== Theatre ===
Year(s)	Production	Role	Theatre	Notes	Ref.
1995	Chasing the Moment	Joe Rutherford/saxophone	Battersea Arts Centre	The One Tree Company	
1996-1997	Henry VIII	Cardinal Campeius/Lord Sands	Swan Theatre, Stratford-upon-Avon	Royal Shakespeare Company	
1997	Camino Real	Kilroy	Swan Theatre, Stratford-upon-Avon	Royal Shakespeare Company, press night	
1997	The Spanish Tragedy	Balthazar	Swan Theatre, Stratford-upon-Avon	Royal Shakespeare Company	
1997	Doctor Faustus	Dr Faustus	The Other Place	Royal Shakespeare Company	
1997	The Spanish Tragedy	Balthazar	Barbican Pit	Royal Shakespeare Company, press night	
1998	Henry VIII	Cardinal Campeius/Lord Sands	Young Vic	Royal Shakespeare Company, press night	
1998	Camino Real	Kilroy	Young Vic	Royal Shakespeare Company, press night	
1999	Closer	Larry	Theatre Royal, Bath and National Theatre	National Theatre	
2000	Further than the Furthest Thing	Mr Hansen	Cottesloe Theatre and Traverse Theatre, Edinburgh	National Theatre-Tron Theatre co-production	
2001	Six Characters in Search of an Author	The Director	Young Vic		
2001	Antartica	Abbott	Savoy Theatre		
2002	A Midsummer Night's Dream	Nick Bottom	Royal Shakespeare Theatre, Barbican Theatre, tour	Royal Shakespeare Company	
2003	Tales from the Vienna Woods	Oskar	Olivier Theatre	National Theatre	
2005	Hecuba	Odysseus/Polymestor	Albany Theatre	Royal Shakespeare Company	
2008	The White Devil		Menier Chocolate Factory		
2010	Antony and Cleopatra	Mark Antony	Roundhouse	Royal Shakespeare Company	
2010	The Winter's Tale	Polixenes	Roundhouse	Royal Shakespeare Company	
2010-2011	King Lear	Earl of Kent/Caius	Courtyard Theatre, Stratford-upon-Avon and Royal Shakespeare Theatre, Stratford-upon-Avon	Royal Shakespeare Company	
2011	King Lear	Earl of Kent/Caius	Roundhouse	Royal Shakespeare Company	
2011	Julius Caesar	Mark Antony	Roundhouse	Royal Shakespeare Company	
2011	Little Eagles	Sergei Korolyov	Hampstead Theatre	Royal Shakespeare Company	
2012	Children's Children	Michael	Almeida Theatre		
2018	Ulster American	Jay Conway	Traverse Theatre		
2018	Don Carlos	Phillip	Northcott Theatre, Nuffield Theatre, Southampton and Rose Theatre Kingston		
2026	Toxic	Salvador Almeida	Film	Kannada-English bilingual	
