= Matt Hope =

British artist (born 1976)

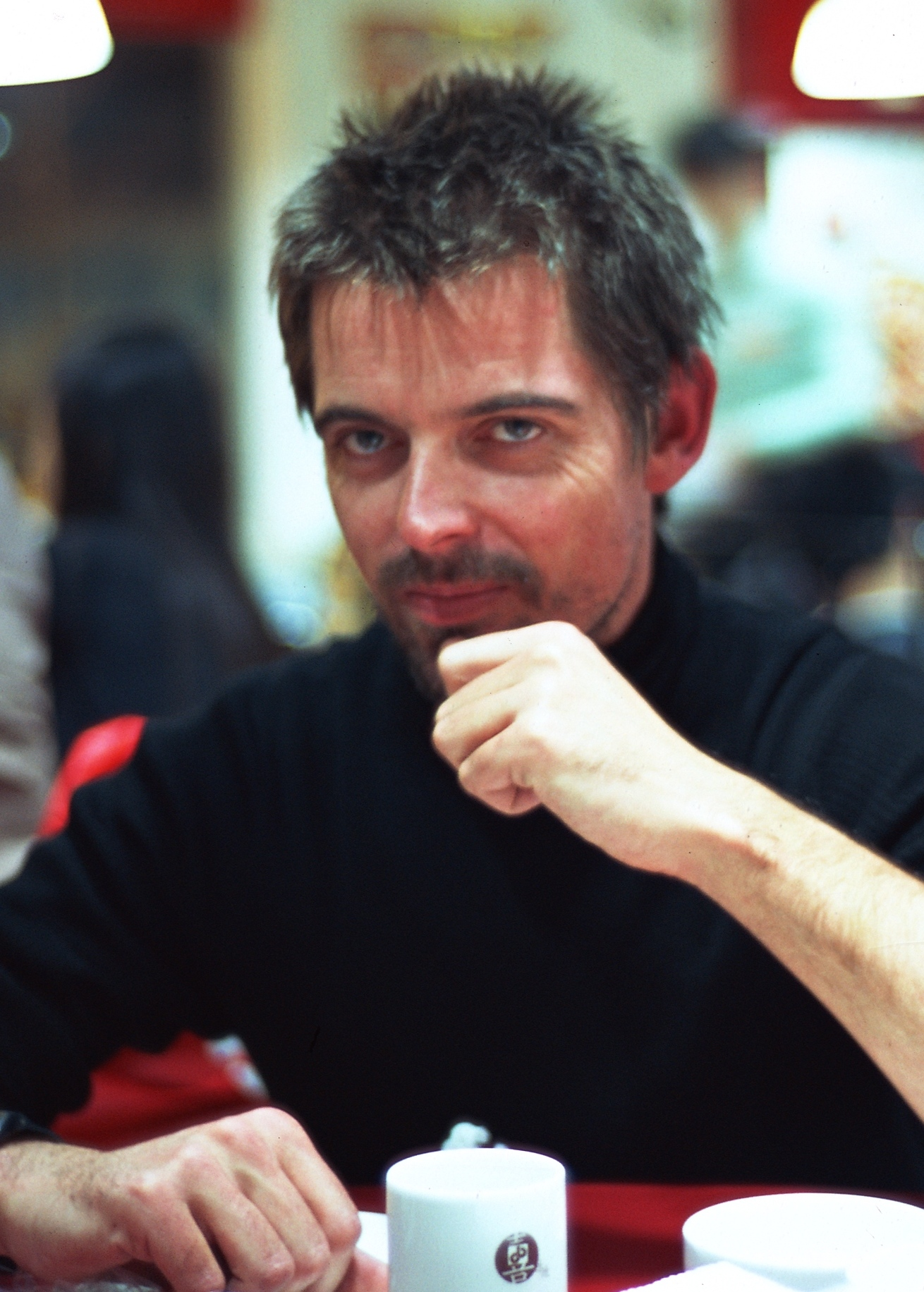
- Beijing, 2008
- Born: Matthew Hope; 1976 (age 49–50)
- Education: Chelsea School of Art, BFA, Winchester School of Art, Mfa, University of California, San Diego
- Known for: Horn Massive, Breathing Bike
- Website: Matt Hope on Instagram

Matt Hope (born 1976, Hammersmith, London) is a British artist who lives and works in Guangzhou in China. He is known for elaborate kinetic art and sound art constructions made in large-scale fabrication factories in mainland China.

== Biography ==
Matt Hope grew up in London. He studied at Chelsea School of Art, London in 1994–96. Hope received his BFA at the Winchester School of Art, Hampshire, U.K. in 1999, and earned his MFA at University of California, San Diego in 2004. He lived in Beijing's Caochangdi, the artist districted identified with Ai Weiwei from 2008 until 2020.

== Work ==
Hope's work uses industrial objects often designed to his specifications and fabricated in Chinese factories that he works with on an interpersonal level. Common materials include speakers systems, solar panels, vehicles and shipping containers, all of which Hope combines into electromechanical sculptures that invite environmental input and flirt with the human scale .

Recent work includes "Spectrum Divide", a solo show at Saamlung Gallery, "Sonic Furnace" featured in the Get It Louder Biennial, Shanghai in 2010, "People's Power Station" at the Chengdu Biennale in 2011 and "Laoban Soundsystem: Infinite Baffle" at a cargo container storage bay in Hong Kong.

Previous work includes Horn Massive and Microscopic Perfect Cube (2005). In 2013 Matt Hope's artwork Armored car (2005) was exhibited at SCOPE Miami by Ace Gallery. The artwork was a Jeep Cherokee reinforced with steel plates.

=== Towers ===
In 2015, Matt Hope had his first solo show at Ace Gallery in Los Angeles, featured sketches, drawings and a set of 10 Towers made of parts bought from the now defunct, Sun Dragon Hardare market in the outskirts of Beijing.

The Towers series consists of ten sculptures built from Chinese-made hardware: switches, motors, and structural elements. These skeletal frames serve as chassis to which components are attached that perform a variety of bizarre functions, kinetic, sonic, or other.

The Los Angeles Times described the Towers:

Each is a sturdy jumble of rods and plates, plastic zip-ties, solar panels, battery packs, timers, audio and electrical components, standing human-height and higher. Most rotate, buzz, pop or make a frightful clatter as they do their ostensible jobs: converting light, heat, sound or one form of power into another.

Sculpture Magazine reviewed the show and highlighted Hope's artwork, "To Fasten" (2006).

=== Breath ===
"Breath" is bike built by Hope that combines various found objects, including an electromechanical filtration system, that filters air while pedalling. Although technically operable, it is more of an artistic and theoretical response, rather than practical solution, to Beijing's pollution problem. "Breath" was exhibited in 2012 at Get It Louder, a contemporary art biennial in China. It is regularly mentioned in International news in connection with China's Pollution Crisis and was the inspiration behind Ofo's Smog Free Bicycle.

=== The Fatality of Lightness ===
Matt made a large sculpture of a steel I-beam with sections machined out of the beam to the point where it became weak in the middle. This 2016 piece was part of the group show at Long March Space in 798 in Beijing.

=== Sum of the Parts ===
In this 2018 June solo show Matt took over the Galerie XC Hua and replaced two columns, building supports that support the second building, with his own steel construction forever altering the space. The show also featured several pieces including Blind Infinity and Closed Loop and Noise Section.

=== Drawings ===
More recently, Hope has been making hyper detailed pen and ink sketches as part of his day.

=== Sleight of Hand ===
In February 2019, his drawings were exhibited by Stefan Simchowitz as part of the Newsstand Project in a show titled, Sleight of Hand curated by Alexis Hyde.

=== #ZEROWASTE & Entropic Bodies ===
In March 2019, Hope lead a community project to create cooling suits like his self-worn, Cooling Suit (2019) before the 2019-2020 Hong Kong protests and COVID-19 pandemic.

=== Miner Arch ===
In January 2020, Hope created plans for how to make an arch from used Bitcoin miners, in Miner Arch (2020).
