= Out of the Blue (1995 TV series) =

- DVD cover
- Genre: Crime drama
- Written by: Peter Bowker; Bill Gallagher
- Directed by: Richard Laxton; Richard Standeven; Keith Boak
- Starring: John Duttine; Orla Brady; John Hannah; David Morrissey; Darrell D'Silva; Neil Dudgeon; Andy Rashleigh; Lennie James; Peter Wight; Stephen Billington; Pauline Black
- Country of origin: United Kingdom
- Original language: English
- No. of series: 2
- No. of episodes: 12

Production
- Executive producers: Caroline Oulton; Matthew Hamilton
- Producers: Jo Wright; Laura Mackie
- Production location: United Kingdom
- Running time: 50 minutes
- Production company: BBC Scotland

Original release
- Network: BBC One
- Release: 23 May 1995 – 9 September 1996

Out of the Blue is a British television crime drama series, set and filmed in Sheffield, and broadcast on BBC One between 23 May 1995 and 9 September 1996. A total of twelve episodes were broadcast across two series. John Hannah and David Morrissey starred as the main protagonists in each respective series. Out of the Blue follows a team of detectives at Brazen Gate CID through grisly murder cases, clashes with an already-divided community and through the dramas of their personal lives. The series ultimately received acclaim from critics, but did not pull in the expected viewing figures, and was subsequently axed after the second series. The complete series is due for release on DVD by Simply Media 10 July 2017.

Out of the Blue was billed as a "hard-hitting police drama", and was noted as the BBC's second attempt to rival The Bill following Waterfront Beat. Series script editor Claire Elliot said of the series; "[Out of the Blue] is a contemporary, gritty, urban reality. It's [sic] tight script, fast-paced direction and strong cast make for powerful and compulsive viewing". The series was shot entirely on film. At the time, the BBC also described the series as "the British answer to Homicide: Life on the Street". The lack of viewers for the series, which led to its untimely demise, was blamed on the fact that "viewers at the time seemed uncomfortable with the hand held camera work and bleak Yorkshire back drop." Writers Bill Gallagher and Peter Bowker said at the time that they were "more interested in character development than plot". However, the series was acclaimed for dealing with strong topics including male rape and euthanasia.

== Plot ==
Ambitious DS Franky Drinkall (John Hannah)'s life is turned upside down when he is diagnosed with epilepsy. His refusal to accept his condition leads him into a downward spiral and ultimately to his demise. DS Rebecca Bennett (Orla Brady) gives an ever-present emotional charge as she finds herself the subject of both PC Alex Holder (Stephen Billington)'s and DC Warren Allen (Darrell D'Silva)'s affections. DC Marty Brazil (Neil Dudgeon) is the joker of the group. The second season sees the arrival of troubled DS Jim Llewyn (David Morrissey), who seems to be working to his own agenda.

== Cast ==
- John Duttine as DI Eric Temple (Series 1–2)
- Orla Brady as DS Rebecca "Becky" Bennett (Series 1–2)
- John Hannah as DS Franky Drinkall (Series 1)
- David Morrissey as DS Jim Llewyn (Series 2)
- Darrell D'Silva as DC Warren Allen (Series 1–2)
- Neil Dudgeon as DC Marty Brazil (Series 1–2)
- Andy Rashleigh as DC Tony Bromley (Series 1–2)
- Lennie James as DC Bruce Hannaford (Series 1–2)
- Peter Wight as DC Ron Ludlow (Series 1–2)
- Stephen Billington as PC Alex Holder (Series 1)
- Pauline Black as Dr Innocent Adesigbin (Series 1)

== Episodes ==
=== Series 1 (1995) ===
No.	Title	Directed by	Written by	British air date
1	"Survivor"	Richard Standeven	Peter Bowker & Bill Gallagher	23 May 1995
A terminally-ill cancer patient is found murdered in his hospital bed. Becky and Warren are sent to investigate a violent rape case, but the victim knows more than she is prepared to admit.
2	"Lights Out"	Richard Standeven	Peter Bowker & Bill Gallagher	30 May 1995
Bruce raises concerns about Franky's health. Warren and Becky are puzzled as to why someone should be collecting the mail and bringing fresh flowers to a man who's been dead for two months. Franky follows up a tip-off about a planned robbery on a pub. Marty takes matters into his own hands after a suspect gives him the run-around, but gets more than he expects in return.
3	"Lion's Den"	Richard Laxton	Peter Bowker & Bill Gallagher	6 June 1995
An investigation into the origin of pornographic images found on Ron's daughter's computer leads the team to a murder scene. Bruce starts to feel the pressure and Franky refuses to take a back seat, despite having been suspended from duty.
4	"Last Bus to Nowhere"	Richard Laxton	Peter Bowker & Bill Gallagher	13 June 1995
A woman is found dead in a bus shelter outside her own home, but the neighbours are reluctant to get involved. Franky's disappearance leads his colleagues to reopen an old case, after it becomes apparent that Franky has been running his own inquiry. A shop-keeper at the end of his tether resorts to drastic action in order to be taken seriously. Ron's personal life becomes the talk of the department after Marty reveals Ron's secret.
5	"Death Friday"	Sam Miller	Peter Bowker & Bill Gallagher	20 June 1995
Relations are strained between Ron and Marty after Ron discovers who spilled the beans on his affair. They find themselves in further trouble when the suspect they've just arrested collapses of a heart attack. Members of a hostile and divided community seem intent on blaming each other when a prominent human rights lawyer is shot and her body moved from the scene of the crime. Franky tries to strike a deal with his informant in order to find out who supplied the gun. Not satisfied with the results, he goes it alone and goes undercover on his own private mission – with devastating results.
6	"Under the Skin"	Sam Miller	Peter Bowker & Bill Gallagher	27 June 1995
A murder inquiry is close to the hearts of the officers at Brazen Gate CID; tempers become frayed as they search for their colleague's killer. The discovery of an old tape of a suspect being interviewed provides a way for the department to come to terms with their loss.

=== Series 2 (1996) ===
No.	Title	Directed by	Written by	British air date
1	"Fake"	David Richards	Peter Bowker & Bill Gallagher	5 August 1996
A young couple, Matt and Joanne, report that their child has been snatched from the bus station, but none of the witness statements tie up with their story. A photo-processing plant alerts the police to photographs of a bound and gagged woman, but the owner of the photos vehemently denies having anything to do with them. His traumatised daughter, Lucy, appears to be hiding something and turns to Warren for comfort.
2	"True Colours"	David Richards	Peter Bowker & Bill Gallagher	12 August 1996
The murder of taxi firm owner, Mr Sidikki, reveals a tangled web of lies surrounding a family feud. Jim reveals his true nature as he pursues the killer. Bruce comes under pressure when his father's schizophrenia starts to interfere with his police work. Marty prepares for his interview with the adoption agency but is thrown out by his wife. Lucy Shaw has moved in with Warren.
3	"Safety Box"	Keith Boak	Peter Bowker & Bill Gallagher	19 August 1996
Ron and Marty investigate a male rape. Warren tries to solve the mystery of money that has fallen from the ceiling of a snooker hall.
4	"Gun and Nail"	Keith Boak	Peter Bowker & Bill Gallagher	26 August 1996
Warren and Becky try to convict drug dealer Tommy Defty for trashing the home of a local informant.
5	"Shooting Ducks"	Julian Farino	Peter Bowker & Bill Gallagher	2 September 1996
Jim investigates the fatal beating of a homeless person, and the poisoning of several others.
6	"Stem the Tide"	Julian Farino	Peter Bowker & Bill Gallagher	9 September 1996
Bruce investigates the death of a fifteen-year-old prostitute. Her mother Fran implicates local boxer, Vinnie Harper.
