= Man-Amplified =

Studio album by Clock DVA
- Released: 1991
- Recorded: Anterior Digital Research Station (Sheffield, UK)
- Genre: EBM, electro-industrial
- Length: 54:58
- Label: Contempo

Clock DVA chronology
Transitional Voices (1990)	Man-Amplified (1991)	Digital Soundtracks (1992)

Man-Amplified is the fifth studio album by Clock DVA, released in 1991 by Contempo Records.

The cover artwork features a portion of The Constructor by El Lissitzky.

== Track listing ==
All tracks are written by Robert Baker, Dean Dennis and Adi Newton.

No.	Title	Length
1.	"Man-Amplifiers"	5:16
2.	"Techno Geist"	5:42
3.	"Axiomatic and Heuristic"	4:49
4.	"NYC Overload"	6:29
5.	"Transitional Voices"	7:30
6.	"Bitstream"	5:55
7.	"Fractalize"	5:06
8.	"Final Program"	4:17
9.	"Dark Attractor"	5:16
10.	"Memories of Sound"	4:39

== Personnel ==
Adapted from the Man-Amplified liner notes.

Clock DVA

- Robert Baker – instruments
- Dean Dennis – instruments
- Adi Newton – instruments, vocals

Production and additional personnel

- Èlʹ Lisickij – photography

== Release history ==
Region	Date	Label	Format	Catalog
Austria	1991	Contempo	CD	CONTEDISC 182
Italy	1992	Contempo	CD, CS, LP	CONTE 182
