= Horn Massive =

Loudspeaker

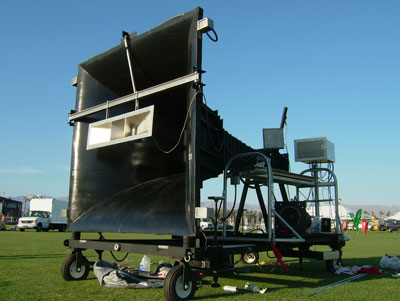
Horn Massive at Coachella festival, California 2005

Horn Massive is a 2.25-ton (4,500 lbs) 3.5 x 3.1 x 4 m mobile 2,000-watt steel and aluminum horn sound system powered by a commercial 12-inch speaker driver. It functions as a mobile audio input station to project audio content a distance of one kilometre. Horn Massive is a monophonic sound projector designed and built by artist Matt Hope.

== Design and construction ==
The core design of Horn Massive is that it is the largest horn which can be transported by a conventional truck. The design process took six months, most of that time spent calculating the steel cutting specifications needed for fabrication. Horn Massive was designed using the software tools AutoCAD, Bass Box Pro, Rhino 3D, 3D studio Max and Horn Calc.

Horn Massive was built at Visual Arts fabrication machine shop at the University of California, San Diego. Fabrication time from cutting the first steel plate to final assembly was 14 months. The construction of Horn Massive required an extensive set of tools and machinery. The major part of the construction time was spent on fabrication, mig welding and machining all of the components. Horn Massive was built with help from the Scripps marine science development shop in La Jolla, California.

The elements of Horn Massive, primarily made of mild steel, include the horn, frame, chassis/platform and lifting rig. All connecting components are made 6061 aluminum. Horn Massive cost approximately $8,000 in materials and components.

== Publicity and events ==
Horn Massive has been discussed in RES magazine, Art net, Art forum, Re-up, and Xtra. It has been exhibited/played at the Supersonic 1 show in Los Angeles 2004, Coachella Valley Music and Arts Festival, Burning Man and LA Freewaves festivals.

== See also ==
- Broadcasting
- Loudspeaker
- Matterhorn subwoofer
