= Fender Marauder =

Electric guitar made by Fender

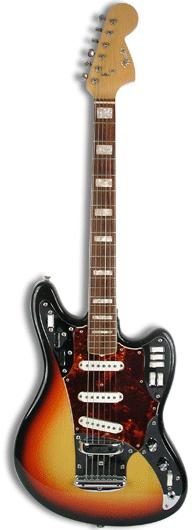
- Fender Type II "Marauder"
- Manufacturer: Fender
- Period: 1962–1966

Construction
- Body type: Solid
- Neck joint: Bolt-on
- Scale: 25.5"

Woods
- Body: Alder
- Neck: Maple
- Fretboard: Rosewood with pearl block inlays

Hardware
- Bridge: Fixed bridge or hidden tremolo
- Pickup(s): 3 or 4 single-coil, specially designed

Colors available
- 3 Tone Sunburst

The Fender Marauder is an electric guitar made by Fender. While originally intended to join the product line shortly before Leo Fender sold the company to CBS, the Marauder remained a prototype and did not enter series production. The unique design was first shown in the 1965 Fender catalog, with its four pickups hidden underneath the pickguard. A different, unnamed design bearing some similarity in shape to the original Marauder prototypes, but with the pickups mounted in a more conventional fashion to the body, has been referred to as the "Marauder Type II", though photographs of this design never appeared in any Fender catalog nor any other contemporary publication.

== Prototypes ==
=== First prototype series ===
After introducing the Jazzmaster in 1958 and the Jaguar in 1962, Fender prototyped the Marauder between 1964 and 1965.

The original Fender Marauder prototype was a Jaguar guitar with an "L" serial number plate built in 1963, and personally owned, modified and played by Quilla "Porky" Freeman. In the late 1970s, Freeman sold this guitar to dealer Norm Harris. Harris soon sold this example to guitarist/historian Robb Lawrence, who later documented the Marauder story. This Marauder had four large, slightly offset 12-pole experimental pickups with deep armatures producing a percussive tonality. Freeman also developed a novel hidden vibrato arm channeled within this prototype guitar. This Marauder eventually became part of the permanent collection of a well-known Bay area musician, where it remains as of May 17, 2012.

Between 1964 and 1965, Fender built several examples of the initial Marauder prototypes, though the model ultimately did not progress from the prototype to production stage, allegedly because the hidden pickups of the Marauder were either too expensive for mass production or the technology itself was too expensive to license.

These original Marauder examples had four wide, high powered pickups with 16 pole pieces, all submerged deep into the body and hidden under the pickguard. Freeman's design concept was to create an instrument capable of providing total ease of playability without the physical interference of large pickups protruding from the instrument's face, while simultaneously providing versatile electronics. The hidden pickups reminded Freeman of a "masked marauder", hence the official catalog name. The four 3-way switches gave 48 different tonal characteristics with their in- and out of phase pickup positions.

While originally intended to join the product line shortly before Leo Fender sold the company to CBS, the Marauder remained a prototype and did not enter series production. These Marauders were never made available to the public, and the six known pre-production models were given away as promotions to shops around the Fullerton, California area.

=== Second prototype series ===
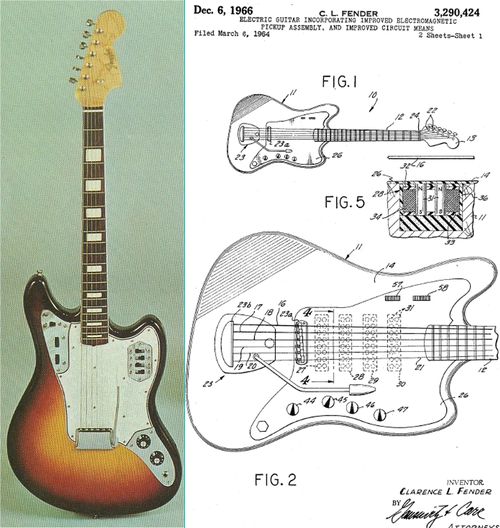
Prototype

In 1966, a second series of prototypes was developed by Gene Fields of Fender. Eight prototypes were created, with the first finished in Lake Placid blue and featuring a headstock with a German carve. Four of the prototypes had angled frets. The unnamed guitar commonly referred to as the Marauder "Type II" design has three exposed pickups, with the bridge pickup slanted similar to that of a Stratocaster. It also has seven switches and four knobs. The goal of the design was to combine the ideas behind the Stratocaster and Jaguar guitars while adding new features to increase versatility.

== Type I features ==
Freeman's other personal instrument was a vibrato guitar in ice blue metallic (later aged to a teal green metallic) with a matching headstock. It had five switches: four pickup controls (one per pickup with on, off, and phased positions) plus a "lead/rhythm" Jaguar-style upper bout switch. It had two sets of volume/tone pots: rollers on the top control plate (the rhythm position) and traditional pots on the lower control plate (the lead position).

Freeman's ice blue metallic Marauder had a 1964 "L" neck plate and was fitted with plastic button "F" Grover tuning machines, which were not used on the Marauders in the 1965 catalog, and was delivered in a brown Tolex case. All hidden 16 pole pickups were custom made for these Marauder Type I models. The present owner of this faded blue Marauder sample also has one spare pickup found on eBay.

At least five more of the original Marauder Type I models are known to have been produced. Fender and Bob Perine showcased two of these first Marauders, a sunburst vibrato version and a non-vibrato "hard-tail" green one, in their 1965–66 catalog as their most expensive guitars. Don Randall listed the instruments on more than one price sheet beginning in early 1965 before abandoning the project for unspecified reasons.

Besides the three seen in Bob Perine's promo picture, it is not known where any of the other Marauders (one in sunburst and one in candy apple red) are now. One possible reason they ditched the Marauder might have been a disagreement of some sort between the new CBS owners of Fender and Freeman. Patent #3,035,472, dated May 22, 1962, covers the Marauder's hidden pickups: "the construction is such that the electromagnetic pickups may be housed within the body of the stringed musical instrument..." After Fender bailed out, Freeman took his patented hidden pickup design to Rickenbacker, and in 1968, Rickenbacker made one prototype of a guitar with four pickups hidden beneath the pickguard before apparently deciding against going into production, again for unspecified reasons.

== Type II Features ==
The second version of Fender's Marauder model, often referred to as "Type II", was produced in both a slant fret and a standard fret version. The slant fret variety was constructed with a unique 25 1/4" scale length and a VI style bridge to account for the increased range required to intonate all 6 strings. The Type II pickups are a blend of both the Stratocaster and Jaguar styles in that they feature a Jaguar cover but no shielding claw. The controls closely resembled that of the Jaguar, but featured phase reverse switches for the bridge and middle pickups and a kill switch.

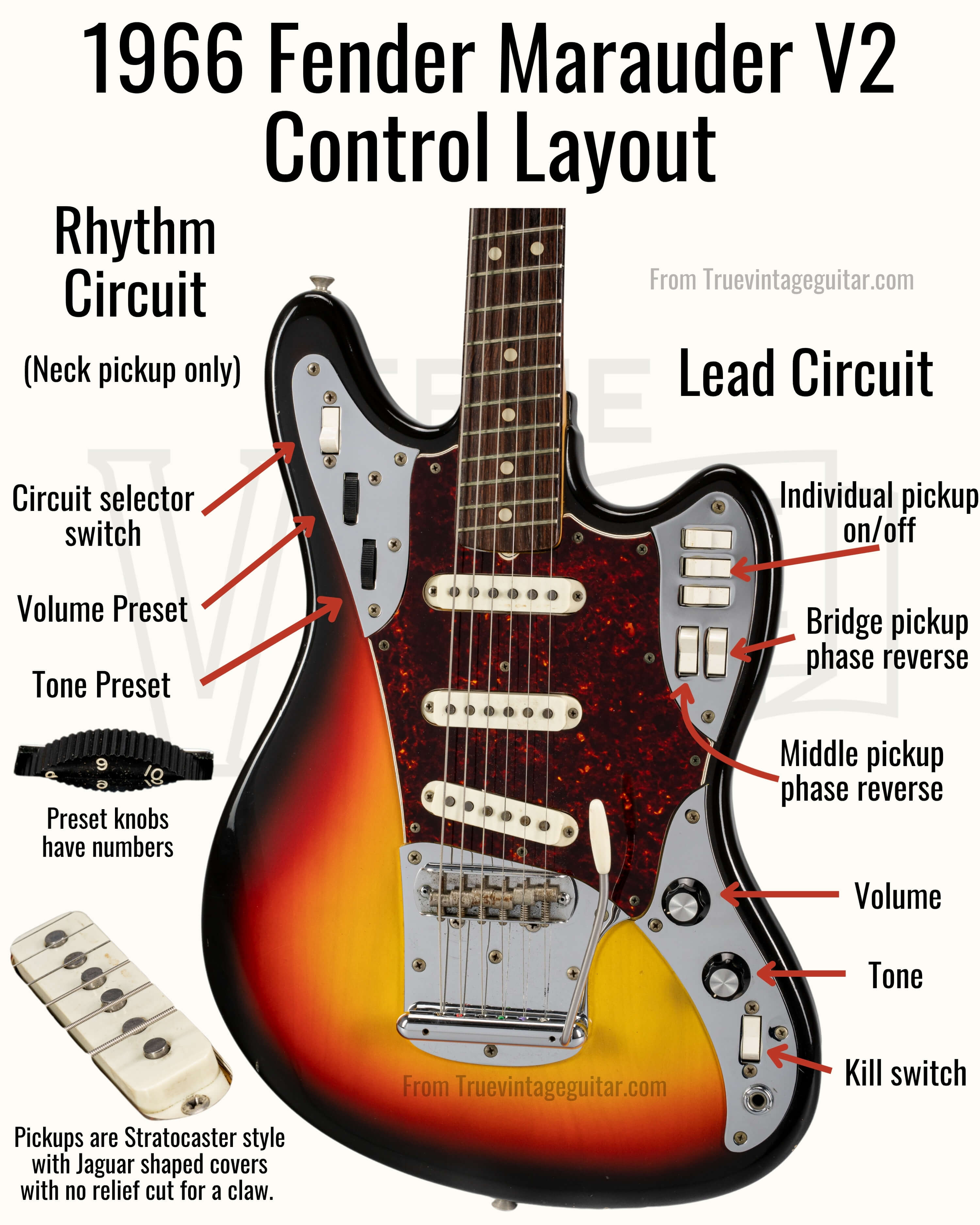
Diagram of the control layout of an original 1966 Fender Marauder Type II guitar.

== Variations ==
Both Fender prototypes and the Rickenbacker prototypes survive to this day. However, to date no additional photographs of Freeman's original hidden-pickup Marauder nor the Rickenbacker version have been published either in print or online, nor have any credible claims of their existence been made known publicly to the guitar collecting world at large. The currently publicly known, extant, and original prototype guitars were initially owned by Freeman and their provenance from him to the current owners is claimed to be well-documented by unknown and unnamed persons who are alleged to still be alive today. It is further alleged that these anonymous owners wish to remain unknown to all but a few similarly unidentified guitar collectors.

Later guitars with the three visible pickups and/or slant frets were built on a differently shaped body, and were never officially named by Fender as Marauders or anything else. Still, some people refer to these experimental guitars as "Type II Marauders" for reasons that have never been clear.

Between 1999 and 2001, Fred Stuart of the Fender Custom Shop built a series of guitars that bore some, but not all, of the Marauder characteristics and which were sold as Fender Marauder Custom Shop reissues. These reissues were not entirely accurate representations of the originals as according to Stuart, no one knew the exact specifications of those Marauders from the 1965 catalog, not even Fender old-timers nor collectors. Stuart stated that all he had to work with was the catalog photo and one body template, found in the Fender shop and labeled "Marauder" in pencil. These Custom Shop "Marauders" were wired differently, had different pickups, and had different body shapes and slightly different dimensions and geometry from the original Marauders shown in the 1965 Fender catalog.

Around the turn of the 21st century, the Fender Custom Shop made a 12-string Marauder model. However, this guitar was different from the mid-1960s original, having fewer switches and a different body shape.

== New models ==
=== Fender Modern Player Marauder (2011-2013) ===
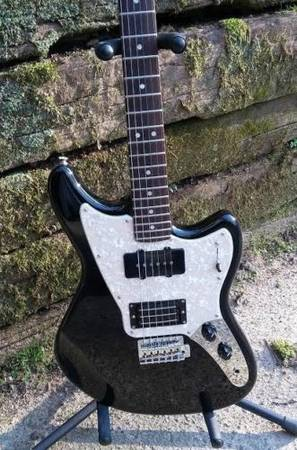
Fender Modern Player Marauder

In October 2011, Fender introduced a new Marauder model as part of the Modern Player entry-level series. This Marauder shares the general body shape of the 1960s original but has a simplified switching system featuring a 5-way switch and master volume and tone controls. It also sports a Triplebucker humbucking pickup and a Modern Player Jazzmaster pickup in the lead and rhythm positions. This model is also unique as the first Fender production model to be made with a Koto wood body. The guitar has a C-shaped maple neck, rosewood fretboard, vintage-style synchronized tremolo bridge, vintage-style tuners, and nickel/chrome hardware. It was available in black and Lake Placid Blue versions.

A review of the humbucker mode cites a bright and punchy sound, which is said to work on heavy riffs and power chords while the triple-coil setting creates warmer tone at a slightly decreased output.

As of 2014, the Fender Modern Player Marauder model has been discontinued with multiple vendors presently listing this version as an increasingly collectable model.
