= The Strat (guitar) =

Version of the Stratocaster electric guitar

Fender The STRAT
- Manufacturer: Fender
- Period: 1980–1983

Construction
- Body type: Solid, double cut
- Neck joint: Bolt-on
- Scale: 25.5"

Woods
- Body: Alder, Ash. Walnut
- Neck: Maple
- Fretboard: Rosewood, Maple

Hardware
- Bridge: unique brass synchronized tremolo
- Pickup(s): 3 single coil pickups, Fender X-1 in Bridge position

Colors available
- Stratoburst, Blue Stratoburst, Placid Blue, Walnut, Aztec Gold, Candy Apple Green, Black, Natural, Arctic White, Candy Apple Red, Sapphire Blue, Ruby Red, Sienna, Olympic White Sunburst

The STRAT (rendered in all caps) was a version of the Stratocaster electric guitar that was manufactured and marketed by Fender Musical Instruments Corporation from 1980 until 1983.

== History ==
Fender produced its first limited run Strat model in 1979 with the 25th Anniversary Stratocaster. This limited run model was sold concurrently with the normal Stratocaster. The next year, the product line was expanded, having previously offered only one model since the guitar's inception (with possible exception of the Walnut Strats produced in the 1970s).

This new model, simply named "The STRAT", was an upgrade to the normal trim, as indicated by its $250 list premium (equivalent to $954 in 2024).

== Features ==
Some construction features returned to pre-CBS specs, including the four bolt neck joint, smaller headstock, and removal of the bullet-style truss rod adjustment.

Many new features also debuted with this model. An added two-way rotary selector replaced the lower tone control (mid pickup) and was wired for more pickup switching combinations, nine in total. The four additional tones were:

1. neck and middle pickups in series
2. middle and bridge pickups in series
3. neck and bridge pickups in parallel
4. neck and bridge pickups in parallel with middle pickup in series

The STRAT featured a hotter bridge pickup, marketed by Fender as the X-1. The controls and hardware were gold plated and included a uniquely massive synchronized tremolo.

There was no standard neck for The STRAT, but three shapes were available: C, D, and U. Some colors featured matched headstock painting.

The high production costs of "The STRAT" led to it being discontinued in the course of 1983.
