= Colectivo 64 =

Bus line in Buenos Aires, Argentina

64

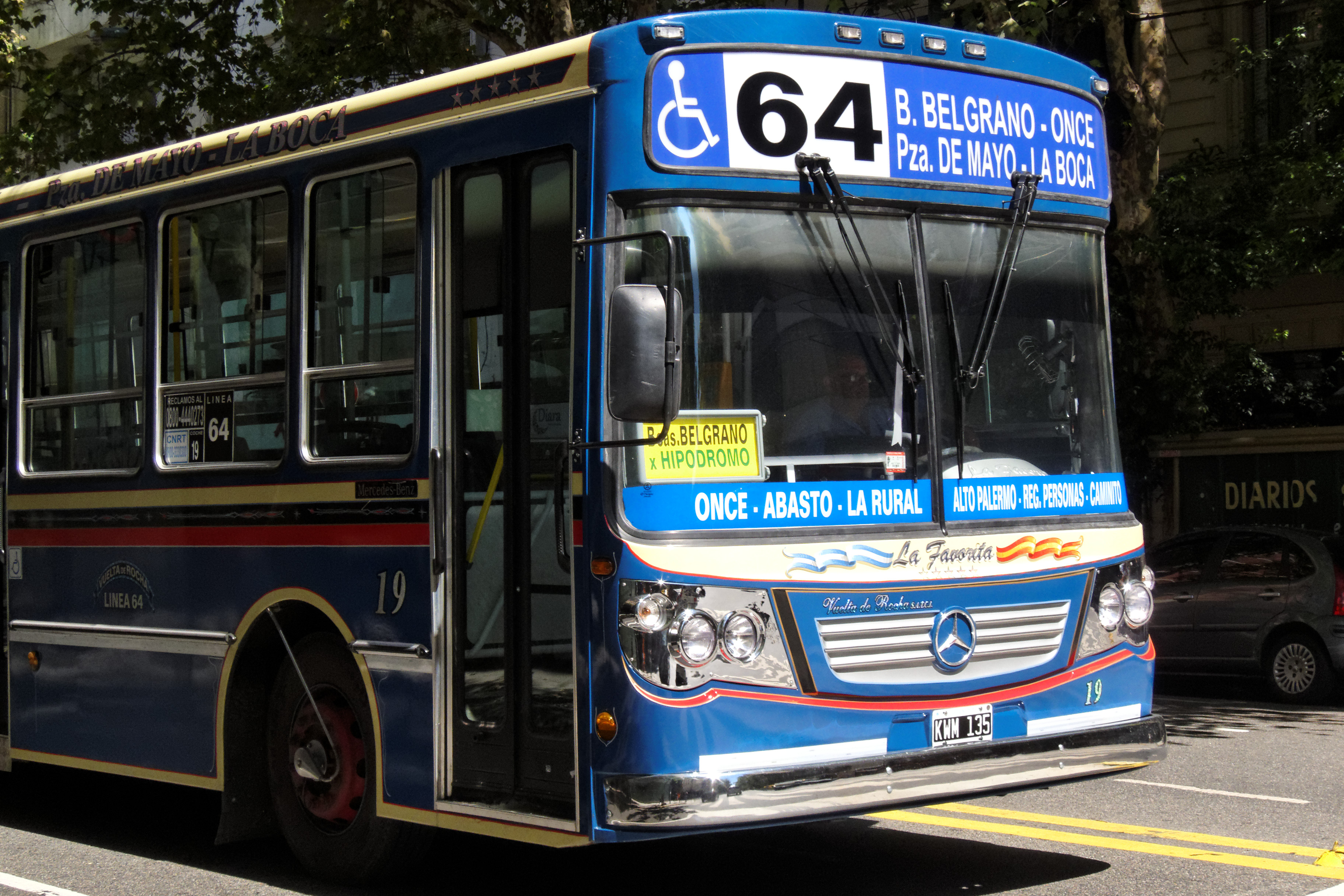

Overview
- Operator: Vuelta de Rocha S.A.T.C.I.
- Began service: 1932

Route
- Start: Belgrano, Buenos Aires
- End: La Boca, Buenos Aires

Service
- Level: Daily
- Annual patronage: 5,638,295 (2019)

Route 64 is a bus (colectivo) line of Buenos Aires, Argentina, that goes through the neighbourhoods of La Boca, San Telmo, Monserrat, San Nicolás, Balvanera, Recoleta, Palermo and Belgrano. Since 1972, the bus route is managed by Vuelta de Rocha S.A.T.C.I.

== History ==
Bus route 64 originally began operations as share taxi route 18 when it was created in 1932. It ran from La Boca to Plaza Italia, and in 1934, the route received the number 64, as well as extending to Barrancas De Belgrano from Plaza Italia. In 1943 the line passed into the hands of the CTCBA. In their hands there were not many changes except that it was managed with a small bus. In 1952 it passed into the hands of Transportes de Buenos Aires and its fleet was filled with Leyland buses.

On July 8, 1955, the line was privatized and initially passed into the hands of "Transportes Pedro De Mendoza" (the company that manages bus route 29). Within this line, it obtained the hundred of "100" on its fleet numbers; its route remained exactly the same with an added split which linked the Argentine racetrack; it was identified with the blue, cream, and red. However, everything changed on June 29, 1972, when it separated from route 29, becoming independent. The first thing they did upon separating was change the corporate name, calling it "Vuelta de Rocha S.A.T.C.I." To differentiate itself from route 29, they also added the color black between the yellow and red lines.
