= Passions Still Aflame =

EP by Clock DVA
- Released: 26 May 1982
- Recorded: December 1981 – March 1982
- Studio: Matrix Studios (London, UK)
- Genre: Post-punk, industrial
- Length: 16:24
- Label: Polydor
- Producer: Clock DVA

Clock DVA chronology
Thirst (1981)	Passions Still Aflame (1982)	Advantage (1983)

Passions Still Aflame is an EP by Clock DVA, released on 26 May 1982 by Polydor Records.

== Track listing ==
All lyrics are written by Adi Newton; all music is composed by Clock DVA.

Side one
No.	Title	Length
1.	"Sons of Sons"	3:19
2.	"Theme From (I.M.D.)"	3:33

Side two
No.	Title	Length
1.	"Don't (It's Taboo)"	4:19
2.	"Noises in Limbo"	5:13

== Accolades ==
Year	Publication	Country	Accolade	Rank
1982	Rockerilla	Italy	Singles of the Year	19

== Personnel ==
Adapted from the Passions Still Aflame liner notes.

Clock DVA

- Paul Browse – alto saxophone, tenor saxophone
- John Valentine Carruthers – guitar, bass guitar
- Dean Dennis – bass guitar
- Adi Newton – vocals, trumpet, design
- Nick Sanderson – percussion

Additional musicians

- Shaun Ward – bass guitar (A1, B2)

Production and additional personnel

- Alwyn Clayden – design
- Clock DVA – production, design
- Jamie Fry – cover art
- Tim Thompson – engineering

== Release history ==
Region	Date	Label	Format	Catalog
United Kingdom	1982	Polydor	LP	POSP 437
