= Collective (Clock DVA album) =

Box set by Clock DVA
- Released: 1994
- Recorded: Anterior Digital Research Station, United Kingdom
- Genre: EBM
- Label: Hyperium; Cleopatra

Clock DVA chronology
Sign (1993)	Collective (1994)	Horology – DVAtion 78/79/80 (2012)

Professional ratings
Review scores
Source	Rating
AllMusic	4.5/5 stars
The Encyclopedia of Popular Music	4/5 stars

Collective is a box set containing three CDs by Clock DVA released in 1994. It was first issued through Hyperium Records as a three-disc set. After the 1,000 pressings were sold, it was re-issued as a single disc through Cleopatra Records.

== Critical reception ==
Dave Thompson, in Alternative Rock, wrote that it "chart[s] the band's progress from techno-soul to their early 1990s ice warriorhood".

== Track listing ==
All tracks are written by Clock DVA.

Disc one
No.	Title	Length
1.	"The Hacker" (Viral Version)	7:23
2.	"The Act" (Activated)	5:22
3.	"Hacker/Hacked" (Operation Sundevil)	7:18
4.	"Soundmirror" (Reflected)	5:43
5.	"The Sonology of Sex 2"	3:45
6.	"Final Program" (Thinking Machine)	4:15
7.	"Bitstream" (Teledildonic Version)	5:52
8.	"H.I.T." (Bio)	4:56
9.	"Cybertone" (Exoskeleton)	3:59
10.	"Virtual Flesh" (Electrosex)	5:58
11.	"Voice Recognition Test" (Cognitive)	5:58
12.	"Cypher" (Glyph)	5:09
13.	"Eternity" (Ballard)	4:34
14.	"Solaris" (Mimetoid)	5:01

Disc two
No.	Title	Length
1.	"The Hacker" (Videomix)	3:24
2.	"The Hacker" (Hacked Version)	7:23
3.	"Re/Act"	5:22
4.	"Hacker/Hacked" (Reprogrammed 2)	7:18
5.	"Hacker/Hacked" (Reprogrammed 3)	7:18
6.	"Soundmirror 1"	5:43
7.	"Soundmirror 2"	5:43
8.	"Final Program"	4:15
9.	"Final Program" (Decoded)	4:15
10.	"Bitstream" (Single Version)	5:52
11.	"Voice Recognition Test" (Single Version)	5:56
12.	"De-Cyphered"	5:18
13.	"Eternity" (Single Version)	4:35

Disc three
No.	Title	Length
1.	"Soundmirror" (Live at Melkweg, Amsterdam, 24/11/93)	5:48
2.	"Pool of Shades" (Live at Melkweg, Amsterdam, 24/11/93)	7:10
3.	"Endless Phase"	4:48

== Release history ==
Region	Date	Label	Format	Catalog
Germany	1994	Hyperium	CD	IRC 31
United States	1994	Cleopatra	CD	CLP 9482
