= 400 Blows (British band) =

British rock band

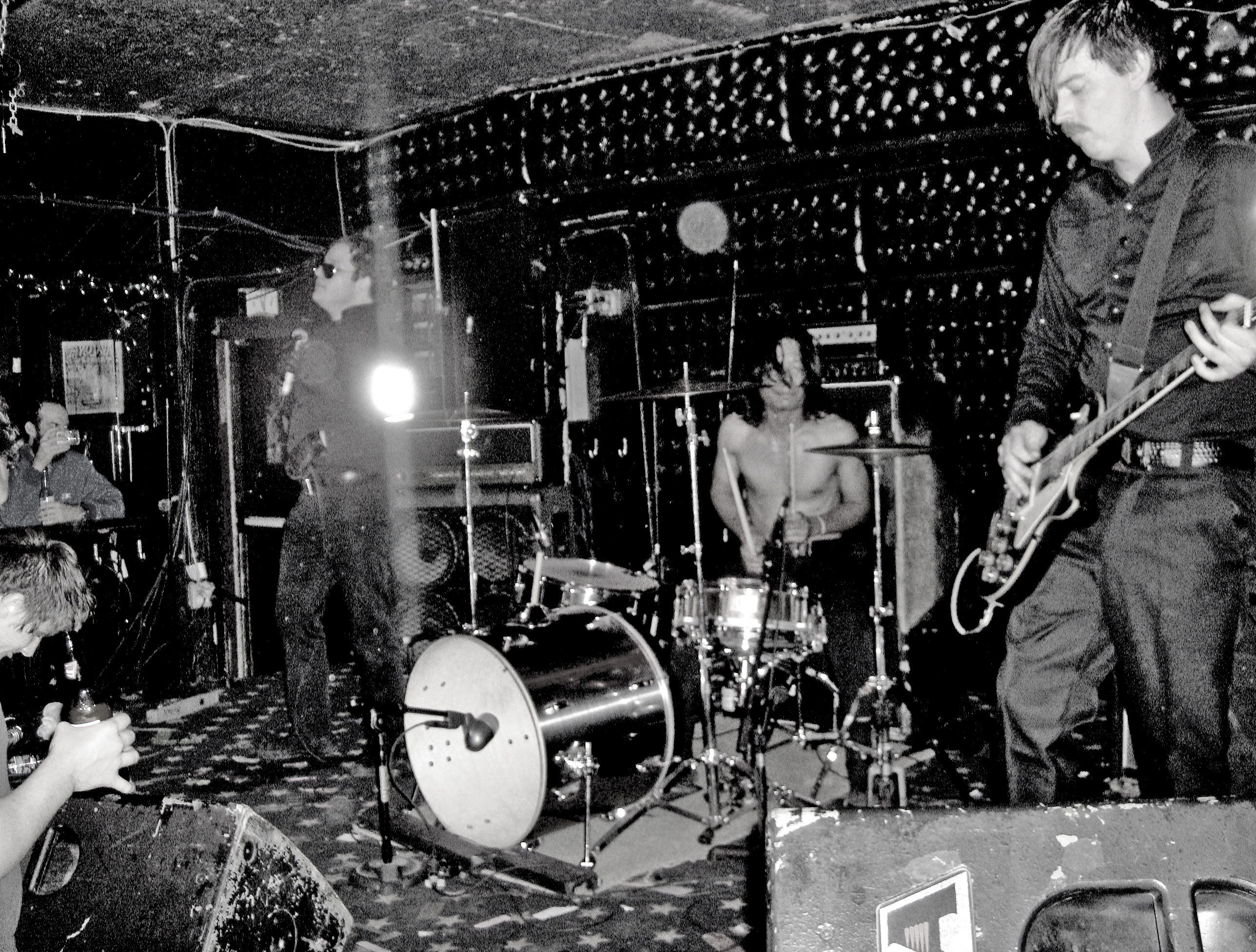
- 400 Blows in 2007

Background information
- Origin: Croydon, London, England
- Genres: Punk rock, post-punk, new wave, electronic, experimental, industrial, dance-punk, minimal wave
- Years active: 1981–present
- Labels: Illuminated, Concrete
- Members: Alexander Scott Fraser; Andrew E Beer; Robert Taylor

400 Blows is a British industrial/post punk band founded in 1981.

== History ==
400 Blows was formed in Croydon, South London by Edward Beer in 1981 along with two friends, Alexander Fraser and Rob. Their debut single was released on their own Concrete Productions record label in 1982. In 1983, they were signed to the Illuminated label and subsequently released an album, "...if I kissed her I'd have to kill her first..." (a quote from serial killer Edmund Kemper to his sister, who was teasing him about wanting to kiss his teacher). In 1985, they released a single, "Movin'", described by Adrian Thrills in the New Musical Express as 'a spiked reworking of the 1976 Brass Construction dance classic'. It reached 54 in the UK Singles Chart. By this time the line up was Beer, Anthony Thorpe, and Lea, formerly the female half of the duo Tom Boy.

Thorpe went on to run the Language record label.

== Discography ==
=== Albums ===
- "The Good Clean English Fist" (1985), Illuminated Entertainment
- "...if I kissed her I'd have to kill her first..." (1985), Illuminated Entertainment – UK Indie No. 3
- Look (1986)
- The New Lords on the Block (1989), Concrete Productions
- The Jealous Guy (2006)

=== Singles ===
- "Beat the Devil" (1982), Concrete Productions
- "Return of the Dog" (1983), Illuminated
- "Declaration of Intent" (1984), Illuminated – UK Indie No. 24
- "Pressure" (1984), Illuminated – UK Indie No. 27
- "Groove Jumping" (1984), Illuminated – UK Indie No. 22
- "Breakdown" / "Jive 69" (1985), Illuminated
- "Runaway" / "Breakdown" (1985), Illuminated
- "Movin'" (1985), Illuminated – UK No. 54, UK Indie No. 3
- G.I. (1986), Saderal – with 23 Skidoo, UK Indie No. 15
- Let the Music Play EP (1986), Illuminated
- "Champion Sound" (1991), Warrior
- "Play Like a Human" (1991), Warrior
- "Tension Release" (1992), Warrior

=== Compilations ===
- The Good Clean English Fist (1985), Dojo – UK Indie No. 17
- Yesterday, Today, Tomorrow, Forever (1989), Concrete Productions
