= 23 Skidoo (band) =

British band

- Origin: London, England
- Genres: Industrial, avant-funk, post-punk, experimental, world
- Years active: 1979–present
- Labels: Fetish Records, Illuminated Records, Ronin Records, Virgin/EMI Records, LTM
- Members: Fritz Catlin; Tom Heslop; Peter "Sketch" Martin; Sam Mills; Alex Turnbull; Johnny Turnbull
- Past members: Patrick Griffiths; Matthew Maxwell; Richard Heslop

23 Skidoo are a British band playing a fusion of industrial, post-punk, funk, and world music.

== History ==
Formed in 1979 by Fritz Catlin, Johnny Turnbull and Sam Mills, and later augmented by Alex Turnbull and Tom Heslop, 23 Skidoo had interests in martial arts, Burundi and Kodo drumming, Fela Kuti, The Last Poets, William S. Burroughs, as well as the emerging confluence of industrial, post-punk and funk, heard in artists such as A Certain Ratio, Throbbing Gristle, Cabaret Voltaire, The Pop Group and This Heat.

Their first 7", "Ethics", was released in 1980, followed by "The Gospel Comes To New Guinea" & "Last Words" 12" single which was co-produced by Stephen Mallinder, Richard H. Kirk and Chris Watson from Cabaret Voltaire at their studio, The Western Works in Sheffield. A Peel Session was recorded on 16 September 1981.

Their début album, Seven Songs, was released in 1982 and is said to evoke the claustrophobic humidity of an African forest. The album went straight to number 1 in the Independent charts. Seven Songs, which was recorded and mixed in three days, was co-produced by "Tony, Terry and David", aka Genesis P-Orridge, and Peter Christopherson of Throbbing Gristle/Psychic TV and engineer Ken Thomas.

A hastily executed EP, Tearing Up The Plans, was produced in the absence of the Turnbull brothers, who were travelling in Indonesia. The personality clashes that arose from this experiment resulted in guitarist Sam Mills and vocalist Tom Heslop leaving the band soon after. The band performed for the first time as a three piece, joined onstage by David Tibet of Current 93, at the first WOMAD festival. This live performance would go on to become the first side of the band's most challenging release, The Culling Is Coming, which also features Skidoo's exploration into gamelan on side two. The album resulted in the band being criticised for being 'too abstract'.

Nineteen eighty-four saw the arrival of bassist Peter "Sketch" Martin following the break-up of Linx. Skidoo recruited Aswad's horn section for the "Coup" 12", which featured samples from Francis Ford Coppola's Apocalypse Now and which was interpolated from their track "Fuck You G.I." from the album Urban Gamelan (1984). Urban Gamelan features Sketch on side one and, on side two, the original three piece line-up experimenting with metal percussion using patterns inspired by gamelan. After having been evicted from their rehearsal space at Genesis P-Orridge's "Death Factory" the band shifted their focus towards hip hop and turned their attention to production and building a studio, Precinct 23. In 1987 they released a compilation album, Just Like Everybody, featuring work from this period.

In 1987 the Turnbull brothers formed the Ronin label and released Jailbreak by Paradox, widely regarded as one of the first breakbeat records, as well as tracks by British photographer Normski and MC FORCE. In its later incarnation, Ronin released material by Deckwrecka, Roots Manuva, Skitz, Mud Family and Rodney P amongst others. They signed to Virgin Records in 1991 and were able to build a new studio with their advance. In 2000 they released a self-titled LP, which featured contributions from Pharoah Sanders and Roots Manuva. This was followed by a compilation of singles, The Gospel Comes To New Guinea in 2002, and for the first time on CD, reissues of Seven Songs and Urban Gamelan. In 2008 the expanded catalogue CD reissues were issued by LTM, who also issued a double-vinyl edition of Seven Songs in 2012. This issue featured the 1981 John Peel session and 12" versions of "Last Words" and "The Gospel Comes To New Guinea". In November 2013, the band played the final holiday camp edition of the All Tomorrow's Parties festival in Camber Sands, England.

In 2012 Alex Turnbull co-directed Beyond Time, a documentary film about his artist father William Turnbull. The film was narrated by Jude Law and scored by 23 Skidoo with both new and old material. The soundtrack album (packaged with a DVD of the film) was released by Les Disques Du Crépuscule in 2014.

== Discography ==
Chart placings shown are from the UK Indie Chart.

=== Albums ===
- Seven Songs (1982), Fetish / reissued on CD (2001), Ronin (#1)
- The Culling Is Coming (1983), Operation Twilight / reissue (1988), L.A.Y.L.A.H. / (2003), Boutique (#8)
- Urban Gamelan (1984), Illuminated / reissued on CD (2001), Ronin (#1)
- 23 Skidoo 2xLP & CD (2000)
- Beyond Time CD+DVD & LP+DVD (2015), Crepuscule

=== EPs ===
- Tearing Up the Plans 12" (1982), Fetish (#16)

=== Singles ===
- "Ethics" 7" (1980), Pineapple (#47)
- "Last Words" 7" & 12" (1981), Fetish
- "The Gospel Comes to New Guinea" 12" (1981), Fetish, reissued on CD (2002)
- "Coup" 12" (1984), Illuminated (#3)
- "Language" 12" (1984), Illuminated (#6)
- 23 Skidoo vs. The Assassins with Soul 12" (1986), Illuminated (#15)
- 400 Blows / 23 Skidoo - "Assemblage" 12" (1986)
- Sulphuric Beats '88 12" (1988)
- "Ayu" 12", w/lbl, promo (2000)
- "Dawning" 12" & CD (2000)
- "The Gospel Comes to New Guinea" / "Coup" 12" (2001)

=== Compilations ===
- Just Like Everybody (1987), Bleeding Chin (#29)
- Just Like Everybody Part Two CD (2002)

=== Videos ===
- Seven Songs / Tranquiliser I & II – VHS (1984)
