= John Valentine Carruthers =

English musician (born 1958)

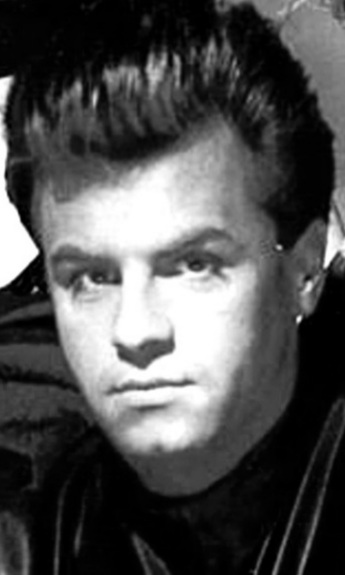
- Carruthers in 1985

Background information
- Born: 1958 (age 67–68); Wortley, West Yorkshire, England
- Origin: United Kingdom
- Genres: Post-punk, alternative rock
- Occupation: Musician
- Instrument: Guitar
- Formerly of: Clock DVA; Siouxsie and the Banshees; Crush; the Mabuses

John Valentine Carruthers (born 1958) is an English musician, guitarist, and composer. He is mainly known for being a member of Siouxsie and the Banshees from mid-1984 until early 1987.

== Early years ==
Carruthers was born in Wortley, West Yorkshire. In the early 1980s, he joined Sheffield band Clock DVA after the release of their second studio album. His first recording with Clock DVA was the EP Passions Still Aflame in 1982. It was followed by the album Advantage in 1983.

== Siouxsie and the Banshees ==
He was then recruited by Siouxsie and the Banshees to be a full-time member of the group from May 1984. With the Banshees, he recorded The Thorn EP (1984), and two studio albums Tinderbox in 1986, and the covers album Through the Looking Glass in 1987. He left the band in January 1987.

== Post years ==
Carruthers teamed up with his friend drummer Paul Ferguson to form the band Crush with American musicians. They released a self-titled album in 1993. That year, he also played guitars on Lloyd Cole's third solo album Bad Vibes, and also took part in the album Wishing Well by Californian band Ten Wings. In 2007, while in New York, he co-composed several songs with Kim Fahy's group the Mabuses on their album Mabused!.

== Equipment and style ==
During his time with Siouxsie and the Banshees, his favourite guitar was a Hofner T6S with active electronics. He developed a fast picking style. On certain songs, he "tuned all the strings to one note, like an A. The first people to do that were the Glitter Band, and that's how they got that peculiar Yowl sound. It's mainly an effect; you fret across the strings with a bar to play melodies, but when you've got five strings all tuned to one note and the amp is turned up, it sustains forever".

His other guitars were a Yamaha SG1000, a Yamaha SG000, an Ovation Breadwinner, an Ovation 12 string, a Yamaha FG 450 acoustic and a self-made Strat copy. He used different audio effects including MXR Flanger "to get a really dirty sound," Drawmer Stereo Compressor, Eventide Harmoniser/Delay, Yamaha 1010 analogue delay and Ashly Parametric. The amplifiers he used with the Banshees were a Peavey Heritage, a Marshall MV50 combo and a Roland Jazz Chorus 120.

Carruthers stated that he used a similar amp set up to John McGeoch's. He used the "Roland Jazz Chorus with a splitter box, and put one signal to the Peavey for a lead sound, and the other to the Marshall which I have really distorted".

On the Banshees' Tinderbox album, he ended up covering all the guitars parts four times. He left all the mistakes in on purpose, saying "I hate playing everything note perfect". He stated that "a couple of the tracks have got eight guitar parts".

== Discography ==
=== Clock DVA ===
- Advantage (1983)

=== Siouxsie and the Banshees ===
- The Thorn (EP) (1984)
- Tinderbox (1986)
- Through the Looking Glass (1987)

=== Crush ===
- Crush (1993)

=== The Mabuses ===
- Mabused! (2007)
