= Buried Dreams =

Studio album by Clock DVA
- Released: 1989
- Recorded: Anterior Digital Research Station (Sheffield, UK)
- Genre: Electro-industrial, EBM, dark ambient
- Length: 58:55
- Label: Wax Trax!

Clock DVA chronology
Advantage (1983)	Buried Dreams (1989)	Transitional Voices (1990)

Professional ratings
Review scores
Source	Rating
AllMusic	3/5 stars

Buried Dreams is the fourth studio album by Clock DVA, released in 1989 through Wax Trax! Records. The tracks feature audio samples from several films. The album peaked at No. 61 on the CMJ Radio Top 150.

The cover artwork features an image of Étant donnés by Marcel Duchamp.

== Track listing ==
All lyrics are written by Adi Newton; all music is composed by Clock DVA.

Side one
No.	Title	Length
1.	"Buried Dreams"	4:02
2.	"Hide"	4:31
3.	"Sound Mirror"	5:47
4.	"Velvet Realm"	6:46

Side two
No.	Title	Length
1.	"The Unseen"	5:22
2.	"The Reign"	5:29
3.	"The Act"	5:23
4.	"The Hacker"	7:25

CD issue bonus tracks
No.	Title	Length
9.	"Connection Machine"	5:57
10.	"The Sonology of Sex I"	4:26
11.	"The Sonology of Sex II (Le Comtesse de Sang)"	3:45
12.	"The Hacker" (Video mix)	3:24

== Personnel ==
Adapted from the Buried Dreams liner notes.

Clock DVA

- Paul Browse – saxophone
- Dean Dennis – bass guitar
- Adi Newton – vocals, trumpet

Production and additional personnel

- Clock DVA – programming
- Marcel Duchamp – illustrations

== Release history ==
Region	Date	Label	Format	Catalog
Germany	1989	Interfisch	LP	01717-08
United States	1989	Wax Trax!	LP	WAX 7094
United States	1990	Wax Trax!	CD, CS	WAX 7094
Italy	1992	Contempo	CD	CONTE 193
