= Jamie Morgan (musician) =

British photographer, filmmaker, and former musician

Jamie Morgan (born c. 1962) is a British photographer, filmmaker, and former musician.

== Music career ==
Morgan formed half of the duo Morgan-McVey who released just one single, 1986's Stock Aitken Waterman-produced "Looking Good Diving" b/w "Looking Good Diving with the Wild Bunch". Originally conceived as a Simon & Garfunkel-style male vocal duo who would harmonise over reggae beats, early demos failed to deliver on the concept. Facing creative inertia, the act's record company convinced them to work with rising pop producers Stock Aitken Waterman, a proposition that left them with mixed feelings. Morgan says "Looking Good Diving" co-vocalist Cameron McVey was so "embarrassed" by the resulting record and video, the band disintegrated.

However, the single's B-side, which Morgan co-wrote, would soon evolve into Neneh Cherry's "Buffalo Stance", which reached number three in the UK Singles Chart and the top 10 around the world in 1988. Morgan says he helped facilitate the track's transformation into a hit, after accidentally meeting its remixer, DJ Tim Simenon, while attempting to evade a stalker who was trying to kill him.

As a solo artist under the name Jamie J. Morgan, he released a cover of the Lou Reed song "Walk on the Wild Side" in 1990, which reached the top 30 in the UK and Australia, and number one in New Zealand. An album, Shotgun, was also released in 1990.

== Photography and filmmaking ==
Since retiring as a recording artist, Morgan has concentrated on photography and filmmaking. He has directed numerous music videos, and the 2007 documentary film The Workshop.

== Discography ==
=== Albums ===
List of albums, with selected chart positions
Title	Album details	Peak chart positions
Title	Album details	AUS
Shotgun	Released: 1990	113

=== Singles ===
Title	Year	Peak positions				Album
Title	Year	UK	AUS	IRE	NZ	Album
"Looking Good Diving" (as Morgan-McVey)	1986	—	—	—	—	single only
"Walk on the Wild Side"	1990	27	25	22	1	Shotgun
"Rocksteady"	1990	97	145	—	—	Shotgun
"Why"	1992	—	—	—	—	single only
"—" denotes releases that did not chart or were not released.
