= Clock DVA =

English band

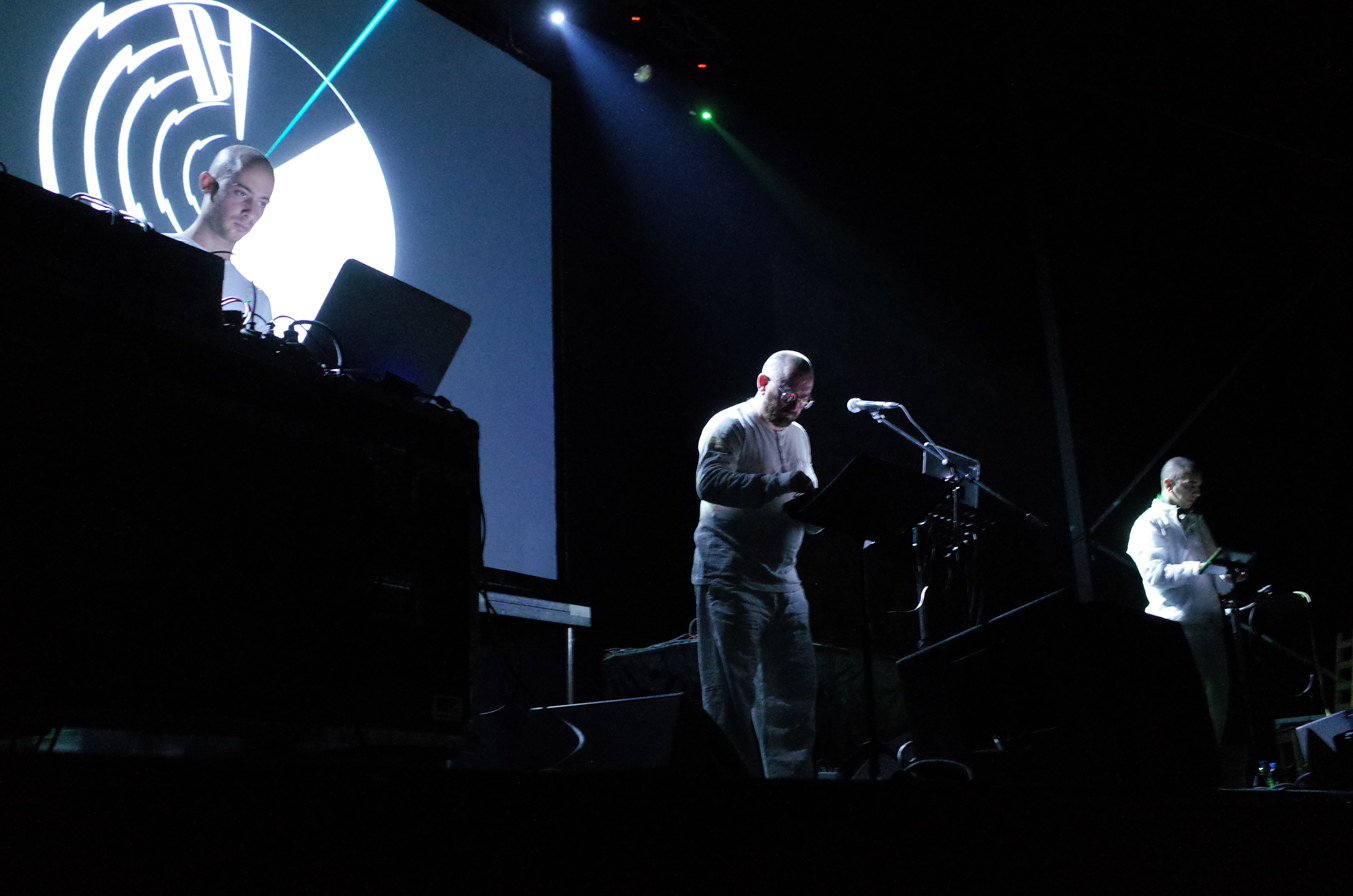
- Clock DVA performing in Moscow, Russia, in 2014

Background information
- Origin: Sheffield, England
- Genres: EBM, electro-industrial, post-punk, industrial (early)
- Years active: 1978–1981, 1982–1984, 1988–1994, 2008–present
- Labels: Industrial; Polydor; Wax Trax!; Contempo; Mute
- Spinoffs: The Anti-Group/T.A.G.C.; The Box
- Members: Adi Newton
- Past members: Steven "Judd" Turner; Jane Radion Newton; Simon Mark Elliot-Kemp; Dave Palmer; Joseph Hurst; Charlie Collins; Roger Quail; David J. Hammond; Rod Siddall; Paul Widger; John Valentine Carruthers; Paul Browse; Michael Ward; Nick Sanderson; Dean Dennis; Robert E. Baker

Clock DVA are a musical group from Sheffield, England, whose style has touched on industrial, post-punk, and EBM. They were formed in 1978 by Adi Newton (born Gary Coates) and Steven "Judd" Turner. Along with contemporaries Heaven 17, Clock DVA's name was inspired by the Russian-influenced Nadsat language of Anthony Burgess's novel A Clockwork Orange. Dva is Russian for "two".

== History ==
=== 1978–1981: White Souls in Black Suits and Thirst ===
Newton had previously worked with members of Cabaret Voltaire in a collective called The Studs and with Ian Craig Marsh and Martyn Ware in a band called The Future. He formed the first line-up of Clock DVA in 1978 with Judd Turner (bass), David J. Hammond (guitar), Roger Quail (drums), and Charlie Collins (saxophone, clarinet) (born 26 September 1958, Sheffield).

Clock DVA was originally known for making a form of experimental electronic music involving treated tape loops and synthesizers such as the EMS Synthi E. Clock DVA became associated with industrial music with the 1980 release of their cassette album White Souls in Black Suits on Throbbing Gristle's Industrial Records.

Paul Widger joined on guitar. The LP Thirst, released on Fetish Records, followed in 1981 to a favourable critical reaction, and reached the top of the NME Indie Charts, by which time the band had combined musique concrète techniques with standard rock instrumentation. "4 Hours", the single from Thirst, was later covered by former Bauhaus bassist David J on his 1985 solo EP Blue Moods Turning Tail.

The band split up in 1981, with the non-original members of the band—Quail, Collins, and Widger—going on to form The Box.

Turner died in September 1981 due to an accidental drug overdose.

=== 1982–1984: Advantage ===
In 1982, Newton formed a new version of the band that included future Siouxsie and the Banshees guitarist John Valentine Carruthers and signed a deal with the major label Polydor Records. The single "High Holy Disco Mass" (which was released under the name DVA) and the EP Passions Still Aflame were released in 1982, preceding the release of the album Advantage (with singles "Resistance" and "Breakdown") in 1983. Trouser Press characterized Advantage as "their strongest, most powerful LP, a funky concoction of intense dance-powered bass/drums drive with splatters of feedback, angst-ridden vocals by Newton, tape interruptions and dollops of white-noise sax and trumpet."

After a European tour in 1983, however, the band split acrimoniously. Adi Newton went on to form The Anti-Group, or T.A.G.C. They released several albums, continuing in a similar vein to the early Clock DVA, yet more experimental.

=== 1987–1994: Buried Dreams, Man-Amplified, and Sign ===
In 1987, Newton reactivated DVA and invited Dean Dennis and Paul Browse back into the fold to aid Newton's use of computer-aided sampling techniques, which he had been developing in The Anti Group. In 1989, they released electronic album Buried Dreams, along with its single "The Hacker".

Browse left the group in 1989 and was replaced by Robert E. Baker. The album Man-Amplified (1992), an exploration of cybernetics, was the next release. Digital Soundtracks (1992), an instrumental album, followed.

Following Dennis's departure from the group, Newton and Baker produced the album Sign (1993).

=== 1995–2007: Hiatus ===
After the release of Sign and related singles, Clock DVA toured Europe (line-up: Newton and Baker with Andrew McKenzie and Ari Newton), and Newton relocated to Italy. However, their Italian record label at the time, Contempo, folded, which caused a number of problems.

Collective, an anthology album and a box set, was released in 1994. Newton began working on new material with Brian Williams, Graeme Revell (from SPK), and Paul Haslinger but continued problems with record labels eventually caused Newton and Clock DVA to take a long break from the music scene.

In 1998, Czech record label Nextera released a reissue of Buried Dreams, sanctioned by Dean Dennis and Paul Browse but not by Newton.

=== 2008–present: Reactivation ===
Adi Newton reactivated Clock DVA, along with his creative partner Jane Radion Newton, in 2008.

Since 2011, Clock DVA has performed at several electronic music festivals and venues throughout Europe with a new line-up consisting of Newton, Maurizio "TeZ" Martinucci, and Shara Vasilenko.

In November 2011, a new Clock DVA track, "Phase IV", was featured on the Wroclaw Industrial Festival compilation album.

In January 2012, German record label Vinyl on Demand announced Horology, a vinyl box set compilation of early (1978–1980) Clock DVA material. Later on, the demo recordings included in this box set, namely Lomticks of Time, 2nd, Sex Works Beyond Entanglement, Deep Floor, and Fragment, were reissued separately in early 2016.

A historical overview exhibition of Clock DVA (photographs, video, and audio) took place at the Melkweg cultural centre, Amsterdam, Netherlands, in February/March 2012.

In July 2013, a new Clock DVA album called Post-Sign was released on Anterior Research. It was produced and composed by Adi Newton in 1994–95 as an instrumental companion album to Sign, though it remained unreleased at that time due to problems with record labels.

According to Adi Newton, Mute Records was set to re-release the eight Clock DVA albums remastered in a box set in 2012.

In 2013, Clock DVA played at the Incubate festival in Tilburg, the Netherlands.

In 2014, Clock DVA released the album Clock 2 on a USB drive through their label Anterior Research. This limited edition release consists of 3 new studio tracks and various remixes of them, in addition to 4 video files. A 12" called Re-Konstructor / Re-Kabaret 13 was released shortly after. A version of the release was also made available on streaming sites and for digital download. A further EP, Neo Post Sign, containing tracks recorded 1995–96 but omitted from the Post-Sign album, was released in early 2015.

Also in 2014, members of Clock DVA and fellow Sheffield band In the Nursery joined former Cabaret Voltaire vocalist Stephen Mallinder in a performance under the name IBBERSON. The performance took place at the newly built John Pemberton Lecture Theatres in the School of Health and Related Research at the University of Sheffield, which was constructed in the approximate location of the original Western Works studio where the earliest Clock DVA recordings were made. The name "IBBERSON" is a reference to a sign which used to hang outside the studio building.

In July 2015, another vinyl box set of early material was released on Vinyl on Demand. Horology 2 - Clockdva, The Future & Radiophonic Dvations features recordings made in the late 1977/1978 period by Adi Newton prior to and during the formative period of development of Clock DVA, including the original The Future recordings made by the trio of Adi Newton, Martyn Ware, and Ian Craig Marsh before The Future developed into The Human League and Clock DVA.

In September 2016, Clock DVA performed a series of live dates in the United States.

In September 2025, Clock DVA joined the Industrial Nation 2025 tour in the US.

== Discography ==
=== Albums ===
- 1980 – White Souls in Black Suits (Industrial Records)
- 1981 – Thirst (Fetish Records)
- 1983 – Advantage (Polydor Records)
- 1989 – Buried Dreams (Interfisch Records)
- 1990 – Transitional Voices (live) (Interfisch Records)
- 1992 – Man-Amplified (Contempo)
- 1992 – Digital Soundtracks (Contempo)
- 1993 – Sign (Contempo)
- 1994 – Collective (anthology) (Cleopatra) / 3xCD boxset (Hyperium/Sub-Mission)
- 2012 – Horology – DVAtion 78/79/80 6xLP boxset (Vinyl On Demand)
- 2013 – Post-Sign (Anterior Research Media Comm)
- 2014 – Clock 2 (Anterior Research Media Comm) - 4GB USB Device
- 2015 – Horology 2 - Clockdva, The Future & Radiophonic Dvations 5xLP boxset (Vinyl On Demand)
- 2016 – Lomticks of Time LP (Vinyl On Demand)
- 2016 – 2nd 2xLP (Vinyl On Demand)
- 2016 – Sex Works Beyond Entanglement LP (Vinyl On Demand)
- 2016 – Deep Floor LP (Vinyl On Demand)
- 2016 – Fragment LP (Vinyl On Demand)
- 2019 – Horology 3 4xLP boxset (Vinyl On Demand)
- 2023 – Noesis LP (ARMComm/Rizosfera Europe)

=== Singles & EPs ===
- 1978 – Lomticks of Time (not on label)
- 1978 – 2nd (Dvation)
- 1979 – Deep Floor (Dvation)
- 1979 – Fragment (Dvation)
- 1979 – Group Fragments (Dvation)
- 1981 – 4 Hours (Fetish Records)
- 1982 – Passions Still Aflame (Polydor)
- 1982 – High Holy Disco Mass (Polydor)
- 1983 – Resistance (Polydor)
- 1983 – Breakdown (Polydor)
- 1988 – The Hacker (Interfisch)
- 1988 – The Act (Interfisch)
- 1988 – Hacker/Hacked (Interfisch)
- 1989 – Sound Mirror (Interfisch)
- 1991 – Final Program (Contempo)
- 1992 – Bitstream (Contempo)
- 1992 – Black Words on White Paper (Contempo)
- 1992 – Virtual Reality Handbook (Minus Habens)
- 1993 – Voice Recognition Test (Contempo)
- 1993 – Eternity (Contempo)
- 2014 – Re-Konstructor / Re-Kabaret 13 (Anterior Research Media Comm)
- 2015 – Neo Post Sign (Anterior Research Media Comm)
- 2016 – Neoteric (Anterior Research Media Comm)
- 2019 – Neoteric RMX4 12" (Anterior Research Media Comm)
- 2020 – Horology IV 2x7" with book (Vinyl On Demand)

=== Video ===
- 1993 – Kinetic Engineering (Contempo)
