= Fetish Records =

- Founded: 1978
- Founder: Rod Pearce
- Defunct: 1983 (final release); 1986 (label dissolved)
- Genre: Industrial; experimental; post-punk
- Country of origin: United Kingdom

Fetish Records was a British independent record label. Its artist roster consisted of largely early industrial, experimental, and post-punk groups. It was also a home to the early works of graphic designer Neville Brody, who created artwork for releases as art director for the label.

== History ==
Rod Pearce founded the label in 1978 and reissued Throbbing Gristle's debut release The Second Annual Report after its initial pressing on the group's own Industrial Records had sold out. Fetish's final release was the compilation album The Last Testament in 1983, which featured a sleeve note written by Jon Savage.

== Artists ==
- 23 Skidoo
- 8 Eyed Spy
- The Bongos
- Clock DVA
- Throbbing Gristle
- Bush Tetras
- WKGB

== See also ==
- List of record labels
