= Chance (Act song) =

- UK 12" sleeve

Single by Act

from the album Laughter, Tears and Rage
- B-side: "Winner 88"
- Released: February 1988
- Recorded: 1987
- Genre: Synthpop
- Length: 4:17
- Label: ZTT
- Songwriter: Act
- Producers: Trevor Horn, Act, Stephen Lipson

Act singles chronology
"Absolutely Immune" (1987)	"Chance" (1988)	"I Can't Escape from You" (1988)

"Chance" is the third single by Act, taken from the only Act album Laughter, Tears and Rage. The single was released by ZTT Records in February 1988 but was quickly withdrawn. This may have something to do with the 12" mix containing an unauthorised sample of ABBA's "Take a Chance on Me". ZTT promptly released the band's fourth single "I Can't Escape from You" a month later. The non-album B-side "Winner 88" includes in lyrics the lines "The winner takes it all" and "Money, money, money" – both big ABBA hits.

The album Laughter, Tears and Rage was reissued in 2004 as an expanded 3-CD box set, containing practically everything the group released plus a wealth of previously unreleased tracks or versions, but the 12" mix of "Chance" (titled "12/1 Chance") with ABBA samples isn't included. Instead, a completely new remix titled 'Throbbin' Mix' appears, along with the standard album and 7" mixes, and the alternate "(We Give You Another) Chance". "Winner 88" appears in two versions in the box set, 'Extended' (originally titled "Winner 88x") and the previously unreleased 'Instrumental'. The original 7" isn't included per se, although it is included in the 'Extended' version - the two versions are the same, except 'Extended' adds a lengthy instrumental coda.

Another new remix of "Chance" titled 'Full Whammy!' appeared on the 2015 Act compilation "Love & Hate - A Compact Introduction To Act" (which contains a 'Director's Cut' version of the Laughter, Tears and Rage album on disc 1), along with the original 7" version of "Winner 88".

The track opens with a sample of Ryan O'Neal's dialogue from the 1985 film Fever Pitch.

== Track listing ==
All songs written and composed by Thomas Leer and Claudia Brücken.

=== 7" vinyl ===
- UK: ZTT / BET1

Side one
No.	Title	Length
1.	"Chance"	4:17

Side two
No.	Title	Length
1.	"Winner 88"	3:27

=== 12" vinyl ===
- UK: ZTT / BETT1

Side one
No.	Title	Length
1.	"12/1 Chance"	7:52

Side two
No.	Title	Length
1.	"Winner 88x"	6:18
2.	"(We Give You Another) Chance"	4:19
