= Duel (Propaganda song) =

Single by Propaganda

from the album A Secret Wish
- B-side: "Jewel"
- Released: 22 April 1985; 25 July 1985 (Japan)
- Genre: Synth-pop; new wave
- Length: 4:12 (Single Version); 4:48 (Album Version); 7:37 (Bittersweet) (12" Version)
- Label: ZTT
- Songwriters: Claudia Brücken; Ralf Dörper; Michael Mertens; Susanne Freytag
- Producer: Stephen Lipson

Propaganda singles chronology
"Dr. Mabuse" (1984)	"Duel" (1985)	"p:Machinery" (1985)

Music video
- "Duel" on YouTube

Shaped picture disc

"Duel" is a song by German synth-pop band Propaganda, released as the second single from their debut album, A Secret Wish.

Released in the United Kingdom in April 1985, it became their most successful single there, reaching No. 21. This led to the band making their sole appearance on the flagship BBC music programme, Top of the Pops, in June of that year. Drums and percussion were provided by Stewart Copeland.

== Alternative version ("Jewel") ==
"Duel" was originally released with an alternative version of the track, "Jewel (Rough Cut)" as the B-side. It features the same lyrics delivered in a more aggressive manner, mainly by Susanne Freytag, over a backing track of heavy beats and industrial sound effects.

A 12-inch mix, "Jewel (Cut Rough)" extended this with further sound effects, and an instrumental version appeared on the group's debut album, A Secret Wish.

The two approaches to the song were combined in two different tracks. "Bejewelled" played the song through, alternating between the two versions, while "Jewelled", on the remix album Wishful Thinking, combined elements of both, with the melodies of "Duel" playing alongside the rhythms of "Jewel".

== Track listings ==
UK 12" ZTT – 12 ZTAS 8/Island – 601 687 (Europe)

1. "Duel (Bitter Sweet)" – 7:36
2. "Jewel (Cut Rough)" – 6:53

UK 7" ZTT – ZTAS 8/Island – 107 336 (Europe)

1. "Duel" – 4:11
2. "Jewel (Rough Cut)" – 3:39

UK 12" "Bejewelled" ZTT – 12 ZTAS 8

1. "Bejewelled" – 5:07
2. "Dewel (Cut Rough)" – 6:53
3. "Dual (Bitter Sweet)" – 7:36

UK cassette "Do Well" ZTT – CTIS 108

1. "The First Cut" – 1:29
2. "Duel" – 4:43
3. "Jewel (Cut Rough)" – 6:52
4. "Wonder" – 1:45
5. "Bejewelled" – 5:14

Digital download "Jewel" ZTT – Ztds 72 (The Beast of Propaganda, Chapter Two)

1. "The First Cut" – 1:28
2. "Jewel (Cut Rough)" – 6:52
3. "Jewel (Rough Cut)" – 3:43
4. "Wonder" – 1:44
5. "Bejewelled" – 5:16
6. "Duel (Voiceless)" – 5:06
7. "Testament One" – 1:19

Digital download "Duel" ZTT – Ztds 67

1. "Duel" – 4:43
2. "Duel (Bitter-Sweet)" – 7:36
3. "Testament Eight" – 1:56
4. "Lied" – 2:54
5. "The Chase (Good-Night)" – 4:02
6. "The Lesson" – 4:17
7. "Duel (Thirds)" – 4:01

== Charts ==
=== Weekly charts ===
Chart (1985)	Peak position
Belgium (Ultratop 50 Flanders)	15
Italy (FIMI)	2
Luxembourg (Radio Luxembourg)	15
Netherlands (Dutch Top 40)	5
Netherlands (Single Top 100)	9
New Zealand (Recorded Music NZ)	17
UK Singles (Official Charts)	21
West Germany (GfK)	30

=== Year-end charts ===
Chart (1985)	Position
Belgium (Ultratop Flanders)	93
Netherlands (Dutch Top 40)	37
Netherlands (Single Top 100)	56

== Use as a sports theme ==
The song is often played at the stadium of Heart of Midlothian Football Club during home matches. "Jewelled", a remix of the song, was also used as the title and credits music of the BBC programme Rally Report (later Top Gear Rally Report) covering the Lombard RAC Rally (now called Rally GB) which is the UK round of the World Rally Championship. The instrumental was also used as the sport "bed" by BBC Radio 1 on the evening news reports News90, News91, and News92.

An instrumental section of "Duel" was used in the mid-to-late 1980s by Australian Television Network's sports section "7 Sport" as an intro theme for their coverage of the Australian Touring Car Championship and the 1988 Goodyear NASCAR 500 which was quite long as the presenter/main commentator also used the timing of the intro to advise the viewers the contents of the program as well as the races themselves.

In the UK, "Jewel" was also used by Channel 4 for its American football coverage in the late 1980s and by Granada Television for its regional Granada Goals Extra programme in the early 1990s.

A shortened down version of "Jewelled" was also played during the Green Flag Lap on the circuit sound system at the British Touring Car Championship for a few years, along with other songs.

== In popular culture ==
The song is featured on Vice City FM, a fictional radio station in Grand Theft Auto VI.
