= Absolutely Immune =

- UK 7" sleeve

Single by Act

from the album Laughter, Tears and Rage
- B-side: "Bloodrush"; "States of Logic"
- Released: 7 September 1987
- Recorded: 1987
- Genre: Synthpop
- Length: 3:21 (Single Version); 4:37 (Album Version); 5:34 ("Absolutely Immune II"); 6:17 (Extended Version)
- Label: ZTT
- Songwriter(s): Thomas Leer, Claudia Brücken
- Producer(s): Stephen Lipson

Act singles chronology
"Snobbery and Decay" (1987)	"Absolutely Immune" (1987)	"Chance" (1988)

"Absolutely Immune" is the second single from Act. It was released by ZTT Records on 7 September 1987. Unlike the previous single "Snobbery and Decay" and its myriad of release formats, "Absolutely Immune" was only released on one 7" and two 12" single formats. The song reached #97 in the UK Singles Chart.

The band's 2004 box set Laughter, Tears and Rage - The Anthology featured a number of previously unreleased tracks from this single. These include an instrumental version of "Bloodrush" entitled "Bloodrush" (Silent), as well as an instrumental version of "Absolutely Immune" and a mix called "Absolutely Immune" (Take 4).

== Track listing ==
All songs written and composed by Thomas Leer and Claudia Brücken, except where noted.

=== 7" vinyl ===
- UK: ZTT / IMM 1

Side one
No.	Title	Length
1.	"Absolutely Immune" (Single Version)	3:21

Side two
No.	Title	Length
1.	"Bloodrush"	4:07

=== 12" vinyl ===
- UK: ZTT / TIMM 1

Side one
No.	Title	Length
1.	"Absolutely Immune" (Extended Version)	6:17

Side two
No.	Title	Writer(s)	Length
1.	"White Rabbit"	Grace Slick	2:29
2.	"Bloodrush"		4:12

- UK: ZTT / VIMM 1

Side one
No.	Title	Length
1.	"Absolutely Immune II"	5:34

Side two
No.	Title	Length
1.	"Bloodrush"	4:11
2.	"States of Logic"	5:00

== Charts ==
Chart (1987)	Peak position
UK Singles (OCC)	97
