= Love: And a Million Other Things =

Studio album by Claudia Brücken
- Released: February 1991
- Recorded: 1990–1991
- Studio: Mayfair Mews Residential (tracks 1, 3-5, 7, 8 and 10) and Maison Rouge (tracks 2, 6 and 9)
- Genre: Synth-pop
- Length: 47:00
- Label: Island
- Producer: Pascal Gabriel (tracks 1, 3-5, 7, 8, 10); Steve Nye (tracks 2, 6 and 9)

Singles from Love: And a Million Other Things
- 1. "Absolut(e)" Released: July 30, 1990; 2. "Kiss Like Ether" Released: February 4, 1991

Professional ratings
Review scores
Source	Rating
AllMusic	4/5 stars
Record Collector	3/5 stars

Love: And a Million Other Things is Claudia Brücken's first solo album, released in February 1991 and produced by Pascal Gabriel and Steve Nye.

The UK singles from the album were "Absolut(e)" and "Kiss Like Ether". Despite favourable reviews, neither of the singles reached the UK Top 40 ("Absolut(e)" peaked at No. 71, and "Kiss Like Ether" at No. 63), and the album itself also failed to chart. Brücken later blamed the album's lack of success on a change of managing director and the promotional team at Island Records just as she was completing the recording of the album. A third track from the album, "Fanatic (The Nail in My Soul)", was only released as a promotional 7" single in France.

== Track listing ==
All tracks are written by Claudia Brücken and John Uriel, except where noted.

No.	Title	Writer(s)	Length
1.	"Kiss Like Ether"		5:29
2.	"Baby Sigh"		4:50
3.	"Absolut(e)"		4:02
4.	"Suicide – A Song for a Ghost"		4:04
5.	"Unforgivable"		4:42
6.	"Moments of Joy"		5:18
7.	"Fanatic (The Nail in My Soul)"	Brücken; Thomas Leer	4:20
8.	"Love: In Another World"		3:59
9.	"Always..."		4:07
10.	"Surprise"		6:00

=== 2010 re-issue ===
The album was re-issued on 27 September 2010 in the UK on the Cherry Red record label as a two-CD set, containing the original ten-track album on the first CD and a second CD entitled Love: And the B-sides and the Remixes.

==== Disc two ====
All tracks are written by Claudia Brücken and John Uriel.

Love: And the B-sides and the Remixes
No.	Title	Length
1.	"Kiss Like Ether (Electrical Embrace)"	6:41
2.	"Whisper" (B-side of "Absolut(e)")	5:06
3.	"Kiss Like Ether (Earth Mood Magic)"	3:22
4.	"I, Dream" (B-side of "Kiss Like Ether")	4:26
5.	"Absolut(e) (Shooting Star)"	7:28
6.	"Absolut(e) (Bastille Mix)"	5:37
7.	"I, Dream (Recurring)"	5:46
8.	"Kiss Like Ether (As Pure)"	3:48
9.	"Kiss Like Ether (Earth Mood Magic in a Present Tense)"	7:32
