= Electric Blue (album) =

Studio album by Andy Bell
- Released: 3 October 2005
- Recorded: 2004–2005
- Genre: Pop
- Length: 51:58
- Label: Sanctuary
- Producers: Manhattan Clique; Andy Bell

Andy Bell chronology
Electric Blue (2005)	Non-Stop (2010)

Professional ratings
Review scores
Source	Rating
AllMusic	3.5/5 stars
BBC Collective	4.5/5 stars
PopMatters	8/10 stars

Electric Blue is the debut solo album by Erasure frontman Andy Bell, released 3 October 2005 by Sanctuary Records. The album was released in-between the Erasure albums Nightbird and Union Street. Bell toured European and American nightclubs to promote the album.

The album features fourteen tracks, co-written and produced throughout 2004 and 2005 with electronic music duo Manhattan Clique, who have worked as remixers for acts such as Moby, The B-52's, Stereophonics, Goldfrapp, Fischerspooner and Erasure. Electric Blue includes two duets with Claudia Brücken of Propaganda and another with Jake Shears of Scissor Sisters, and encompasses a variety of musical genres, most notably Giorgio Moroder-style disco, electro and house music. Upon release the album received mixed reviews, although more often than not critics were positive.

The first single, "Crazy", was released on 26 September 2005, and included club remixes from Erasure-partner Vince Clarke, plus Cicada, Manhattan Clique and King Roc. The second single, "I'll Never Fall in Love Again", was released 29 May 2006 and was remixed by Goetz, Jaded Alliance and Mr. Do. Included with this single is a non-album B-side track "Back Into the Old Routine".

"Crazy" peaked at number 35 on the UK Singles Chart and was a top-3 success on the U.S. Hot Dance Music/Club Play chart. Electric Blue hit number 119 in the UK and number 12 on Billboard's Top Electronic Albums chart.

== Track listing ==
All songs were written by Bell, Philip Larsen and Chris Smith, except where noted.

1. "Intro"
2. "Caught in a Spin"
3. "Crazy"
4. "Love Oneself" (Bell, Claudia Brücken, Larsen, Smith)
5. "I Thought It Was You" (Bell, Larsen, Jake Shears, Smith)
6. "Electric Blue" (Bell, Larsen, Smith, Conn)
7. "Jealous"
8. "Shaking My Soul"
9. "Runaway"
10. "I'll Never Fall in Love Again"
11. "Delicious"
12. "Fantasy"
13. "See the Lights Go Out"
14. "The Rest of Our Lives" (Bell, Gurney, Larsen, Smith)

== Chart performance ==
Chart (2005)	Peak position
UK Albums Chart	119
U.S. Dance/Electronic Albums	12

== Singles ==
- 2005 "Crazy" maxi-single – #35 UK, #3 U.S. Dance
1. "Crazy" (MHC stateside remix)
2. "Crazy" (MHC stateside dub)
3. "Crazy" (MHC alternative stateside remix)
4. "Crazy" (original radio edit)
5. "Crazy" (Cicada vocal remix)
6. "Crazy" (King Roc remix)
7. "Crazy" (Vince Clarke remix)
8. "Crazy" (MHC master mix)
9. "Crazy" (CD-ROM track: music video)
- 2005 "Crazy" single
1. "Crazy" (radio edit)
2. "Little Girl Lies" (non-album track)
- 2005 "Crazy" DVD single
1. "Crazy" (video)
2. "Crazy" (acoustic)
3. "Names Change" (non-album track)
- 2006 "I'll Never Fall in Love Again"
1. "I'll Never Fall in Love Again" (album version)
2. "I'll Never Fall in Love Again" (Jaded Alliance remix)
3. "I'll Never Fall in Love Again" (Goetz extended remix)
4. "I'll Never Fall in Love Again" (Mr. Do's remix)
5. "I'll Never Fall in Love Again" (Goetz mix radio edit)
6. "Back Into the Old Routine" (non-album track)
- 2006 "Electric Blue" / "I'll Never Fall in Love Again" remix promo
1. "Electric Blue" (MHC remix)
2. "I'll Never Fall in Love Again" (Jaded Alliance vocal)
3. "I'll Never Fall in Love Again" (Goetz extended mix)
4. "I'll Never Fall in Love Again" (Mr. Do's vocal edit)
5. "Electric Blue" (extended album version)

== Personnel ==
- Andy Bell – vocals
- Philip Larsen – synthesisers and programming
- Chris Smith – synthesisers and programming
- Claudia Brücken – vocals on two tracks
- Jake Shears – vocals on one track
- Filippo Gaetani – bass on one track
- Adrian Revell – brass on one track
- Winston Rollins – brass on one track
- Martin Shaw – brass on one track

=== Additional personnel ===
- Manhattan Clique – production
- Dick Beetham – mastering
- Phyllis Cohen – artwork, body painting
- Michael Conn – string arrangements
- Rob Crane – art direction
- Tim Flach – photography
- Drew Griffiths – mixing
- Bob Kraushaar – mixing
- Ian Remmer – mixing
