= Dr. Mabuse (Propaganda song) =

"The Nine Lives of Dr. Mabuse"

Single by Propaganda

from the album A Secret Wish
- A-side: "Das Testaments des Mabuse (The Third Side)"
- B-side: "Femme Fatale (The Woman with the Orchid)"
- Released: 27 February 1984 (UK); March 1984 (Spain); 21 June 1984 (Japan); July 1984 (Australia); 3 September 2021 (Definition Series)
- Genre: New wave; synth-pop
- Length: 4:11 (The Ninth Life Of...); 4:21 (A Paranoid Fantasy)
- Label: ZTT; Island
- Songwriters: Andreas Thein; Michael Mertens; Ralf Dörper
- Producer: Trevor Horn

Propaganda singles chronology
"The Nine Lives of Dr. Mabuse" (1984)	"Duel" (1985)

Music video
- "Dr. Mabuse" on YouTube

"The Nine Lives of Dr. Mabuse" (often shortened to "Dr. Mabuse") is the debut single by German new wave/synth-pop band Propaganda. The song was produced by Trevor Horn and was released on his label, ZTT in 1984. It appears on the band's debut album A Secret Wish. The song was a moderate chart hit in the UK and Switzerland, peaking at numbers 27 and 14, respectively. In Germany, the song reached the top 10, peaking at No. 7.

The song is a reference to the character in the three Fritz Lang films; Dr. Mabuse the Gambler, The Testament of Dr. Mabuse and The Thousand Eyes of Dr. Mabuse.

A music video was produced, directed by Anton Corbijn, featuring Polish actor Vladek Sheybal as the titular character.

The 12" version features a cover of the Velvet Underground's "Femme Fatale" as its B-side. The cover was also released on the 1985 various artists compilation album I Q 6 Zang Tumb Tuum Sampled and on the 2002 compilation Outside World.

An instrumental remix of this song called "Abuse" appeared in the opening credits of the John Hughes 1987 film Some Kind of Wonderful, in which Mary Stuart Masterson's character, Watts, drums along to the dominant percussion. This version does not appear on the film's official soundtrack, however.

Towards the end of the song, just before the climax, some gibberish appears. It is actually the German question "Warum schmerzt es, wenn mein Herz den Schlag verpasst?" played backwards. The English translation is "Why does it hurt when my heart misses the beat?", the first lyrics of the song. Shortly before that, a German line also appears in the verse: "Kein Zurück für dich", followed by the English line "There's no way back", meaning the same thing.

== Track listings ==
UK 12" ZTT – 12 ZTAS 2/Island – 13SI-238 (Japan)

1. "Das Testaments Des Mabuse" – 10:14
2. "Femme Fatale (The Woman with the Orchid)" – 4:22
3. "(The Ninth Life Of...) Dr. Mabuse" – 4:06

UK 7" ZTT – ZTAS 2

1. "Dr. Mabuse" (special instrumental mix) – 5:18
2. "Dr. Mabuse Der Spieler" – 5:38

UK cassette ZTT – CTIS 101

1. "Das Testaments Des Mabuse" – 10:08
2. "Dr. Mabuse (A Paranoid Fantasy)" – 4:19

Europe 12" Island – 601 222

1. "Dr. Mabuse" (DJ remix) – 9:50
2. "Femme Fatale (The Woman with the Orchid)" – 3:19
3. "(The Ninth Life Of...) Dr. Mabuse" – 4:06

Europe 7" Island – 106 281

1. "Dr. Mabuse: The First Side: 'A To-Day'" – 4:20
2. "Dr. Mabuse der Spieler: The Second Side: 'B To-Morrow'" – 5:41

New Zealand 12" Festival – X 14104

1. "Dr. Mabuse" (13th Life mix) – 6:32
2. "Femme Fatale (The Woman with the Orchid)" – 3:19
3. "(The Ninth Life Of...) Dr. Mabuse" – 4:06

Digital download ZTT – ZTDS66 (Definition Series)

1. "Dr. Mabuse (A Paranoid Fantasy)" – 4:21
2. "Dr. Mabuse der Spieler (An International Incident)" – 5:41
3. "Das Testaments Des Mabuse" – 10:16
4. "Femme Fatale (The Woman with the Orchid)" – 3:21
5. "Dr. Mabuse (The Ninth Life Of...)" – 4:11
6. "Testament Four" – 0:24
7. "Die Tausend Augen Des Mabuse" – 9:46
8. "Im Stahlnetz Des Mabuse" – 3:16
9. "Strength to Dream (The First Life Of...)" – 2:29

Digital download ZTT – "Dr. Mabuse (His Last Will and Testament)" (The Beast of Propaganda)

1. "Dr. Mabuse (The 13th Life Of...)" – 6:34
2. "Dr. Mabuse" (special instrumental mix) – 5:25
3. "Femme Fatale (The Orchid)" – 3:21
4. "Dr. Mabuse" (Anton Corbijn video mix) – 4:51
5. "Testament Six" – 0:31
6. "Dr. Mabuse" (12" remix for Germany) – 6:07
7. "Das Testament Des Dr Mabuse" (12" edit for Germany) – 9:54
8. "Dr. Mabuse (An International Conclusion)" – 5:40
9. "Strength to Dream (As Testament Seven)" – 3:16

== Chart performance ==
Chart (1984)	Peak position
Germany (Official German Charts)	7
Switzerland (Schweizer Hitparade)	14
UK Singles (Official Charts Company)	27
