= I Can't Escape from You =

I Can't Escape from You may refer to:

- I Can't Escape from You (Bing Crosby song), 1936
- I Can't Escape from You (Hank Williams song), 1953
- I Can't Escape from You (Act song), 1988
