= Torsten (Andy Bell series) =

Torsten is a series of projects by pop singer Andy Bell of the band Erasure consisting of various stage acts performed by him, and accompanying soundtracks, concept albums and remix albums. The series was written by playwright Barney Ashton-Bullock, and music by Christopher Frost. Two major works emerged, Torsten the Bareback Saint (2014) and Torsten the Beautiful Libertine (2016) with two accompanying album / soundtracks and two Variance Remix albums.

== Torsten the Bareback Saint ==
Torsten the Bareback Saint
- Music: Christopher Frost
- Lyrics: Barney Ashton-Bullock
- Setting: England
- Premiere: 5 August 2014: Assembly Rooms Edinburgh
- Productions: 2014 Edinburgh Festival Fringe

Torsten the Bareback Saint is a one-person show and concept album written by playwright Barney Ashton-Bullock, and performed by pop singer Andy Bell. The score is composed, orchestrated and arranged by Christopher Frost and produced by Mike Allison. The artistic director was Predrag Pajdic.

Promotional material for the show describes it as "a set of musical postcards from the hotspots of memory of a semi-immortal polysexual". The music is an episodic song-cycle, which Bell performs accompanied by a small musical ensemble.

Bell debuted the show at the 2014 Edinburgh Festival Fringe, where he performed at Assembly Studio One daily from the 5th through the 16th of August. Prior to the festival, he gave two private performances at St James Theatre, London. The first of these, on 24 July 2014, was for an invited audience of family and friends; the second, on 26 July, he performed for a small gathering of fans.

=== Soundtrack album ===
Torsten the Bareback Saint

Soundtrack album by Andy Bell
- Released: 28 July 2014
- Label: Strike Force Entertainment

Andy Bell chronology
Non-Stop (2010)	Torsten the Bareback Saint (2014)	Torsten the Beautiful Libertine (2016)

Singles from Torsten the Bareback Saint
- 1. "I Don't Like" Released: 7 July 2014; 2. "Fountain of Youth" Released: 11 August 2014

A studio-recorded soundtrack album was released on 28 July 2014 by Strike Force Entertainment, an imprint of Cherry Red Records.

Two songs were released as singles. "I Don't Like" released on 7 July 2014 and "Fountain of Youth" released on 11 August 2014.

All lyrics are written by Barney Ashton-Bullock.

No.	Title	Length
1.	"Freshly Buggered"	0:36
2.	"Teacher! Teacher!"	1:51
3.	"Free"	1:50
4.	"Star for Life"	2:03
5.	"Bingo Hall Baby"	3:17
6.	"Fountain of Youth"	6:58
7.	"World Without End"	1:54
8.	"Vagina"	1:46
9.	"I Don't Like"	4:15
10.	"Mobile Fucked"	3:05
11.	"The Boy from the Sauna"	3:01
12.	"Weston-Super-Mare"	3:07
13.	"(We Waited for) The Circus"	2:40
14.	"Good Things"	2:06
15.	"People Come, People Go"	2:03
16.	"Don't Call Me Up"	4:01
17.	"Tell Me the Story of Your Poverty"	1:59
18.	"This Gay Thing Isn't Working"	3:24
19.	"Aflame"	2:11
20.	"Mr. Average"	3:24
21.	"Is It Not Enough?"	2:46
22.	"As I Prepare to Take My Life"	4:29
Total length:		62:46

On the back cover of the retail CD release, the titles of tracks 1, 8, and 10 are censored: "Freshly", "V for…?", and "Mobile".

=== Variance – 'The Torsten the Bareback Saint' Remixes ===
Variance – 'The Torsten the Bareback Saint' Remixes

Remix album by Andy Bell
- Released: 4 September 2015
- Label: Cherry Red Records

Singles from Variance The Torsten the Bareback Saint Remixes
- 1. "Weston-Super-Mare" Released: 2015

Following the release of the soundtrack, a remix album was released in 2015. One single, "Weston-Super-Mare" was released from the remix album in 2015.

All lyrics are written by Barney Ashton-Bullock.

No.	Title	Length
1.	"Weston-Super-Mare" (Radio Super mix)
2.	"Weston-Super-Mare" (Extended version)
3.	"Weston-Super-Mare" (Dancing with Ruby remix)
4.	"Weston-Super-Mare" (Mooger remix)
5.	"Weston-Super-Mare" (Industrial Soundscape mix)
6.	"Bingo Hall Baby" (Electropop remake)
7.	"I Don't Like" (Radio remix)
8.	"Fountain of Youth" (Radio remix)
9.	"Tosten the Bareback Saint" (Promotional medley)

== Torsten the Beautiful Libertine ==
Torsten the Beautiful Libertine
- Music: Christopher Frost
- Lyrics: Barney Ashton-Bullock
- Setting: England
- Premiere: 4 March 2016: Above The Stag Theatre, London

Torsten the Beautiful Libertine

Soundtrack album by Andy Bell
- Released: 4 March 2016
- Label: Cherry Red Records

Andy Bell chronology
Torsten the Bareback Saint (2014)	Torsten the Beautiful Libertine (2016)

Singles from Torsten the Beautiful Libertine
- 1. "My Precious One" Released: 4 March 2016

Following Torsten the Bareback Saint, Andy launched a musical stage show titled Torsten the Beautiful Libertine at the Above the Stag Theatre in London in March 2016. It is also written by playwright Barney Ashton-Bullock, with music by Christopher Frost.

=== Soundtrack album ===
He also released a 17-track album containing songs written by Barney Ashton-Bullock. It was released on Cherry Red Records. From the press release: "On the album Andy assumes the character of Torsten who has had, over time, many lovers and friends whom ultimately he has outlived. That he himself survives is a bittersweet truth, but it is with an increasingly melancholic emotional distance from people.

The album was made available as a download and also in a limited-edition black vinyl and CD format presented in mini-gatefold LP style. It also includes a twenty page booklet of lyrics and new colour photographs.

One song was released as a single "My Precious One" on 4 March 2016

Tracklist

All lyrics are written by Barney Ashton-Bullock.

No.	Title	Length
1.	"Statement of Intent"	3:02
2.	"Beautiful Libertine"	6:26
3.	"Loitering with Intent"	3:17
4.	"This Town Needs Jesus"	5:19
5.	"The Slums We Loved"	4:18
6.	"Lady Domina Bizarre"	2:24
7.	"(Ooh Baby, You're So) Queercore!" (with Lana Pillay on lead vocals)	3:54
8.	"Blow Jobs for Cocaine"	3:22
9.	"I'm Your Lover"	3:56
10.	"Rupert Drinks Vodka"	1:35
11.	"We Were Singing Along to Liza"	4:27
12.	"Photos of Daniel"	2:40
13.	"I Am the Boy Who Smiled at You"	4:57
14.	"Bond Street Catalogues"	6:49
15.	"My Precious One"	3:08
16.	"To Have and to Hold"	1:31
17.	"Statement of Intent (Reprise)"	1:11

=== Variance – 'The Torsten the Beautiful Libertine' Remixes ===
Variance – 'The Torsten the Beautiful Libertine' Remixes

Remix album by Andy Bell
- Released: 1 July 2016
- Label: Cherry Red Records

Singles from Variance II: The Torsten the Beautiful Libertine Remixes
- 1. "Queercore!" Released: 1 July 2016

Like the Torsten the Bareback Saint, the release of Torsten the Beautiful Libertine was followed by a Variance Remix titled Variance II. The remix album was released on 1 July 2016. One more single, "Queercore!" was released from the remix album in 2016.

Tracklist

Part One - Senseless Symphony

No.	Title	Length
1.	"Senseless / I Am Torsten / Freshly Buggered / Society, Society / Pre-Op, Post-Silicon / Extracurricular Affirmation / That Judas Kiss"

Part Two - The Remixes

No.	Title	Length
2.	"My Precious One" (Hulda Remix)
3.	"Queercore!" (con Lana Pillay -Matt Pop Club Remix-)
4.	"Photos of Daniel" (Analog Nord Remix)
5.	"My Precious One" (Vince Clarke Remix)
6.	"The Slums We Loved" (Barry Harris Remix)
7.	"We Were Singing Along to Liza" (Shelter Remix)
8.	"Beautiful Libertine" (Joe Gauthreaux Stadium Remix)
9.	"My Precious One" (Extended Semi-Acoustic Version)
10.	"Queercore!" (con Lana Pillay -Matt Pop Radio Mix-)
