= I Can't Escape from You (Act song) =

- UK 12" sleeve

Single by Act

from the album Laughter, Tears and Rage
- B-side: "Dear Life"; "Heaven Knows I'm Miserable Now"
- Released: 7 March 1988
- Recorded: 1987
- Genre: Synthpop
- Length: 3:05
- Label: ZTT
- Songwriter(s): Thomas Leer, Claudia Brücken
- Producer(s): Stephen Lipson

Act singles chronology
"Chance" (1988)	"I Can't Escape from You" (1988)

Alternative cover
- UK 7" sleeve

"I Can't Escape from You" is the fourth and final single from synthpop band Act. Due to previous single "Chance" being withdrawn, ZTT Records hurriedly released "I Can't Escape from You" on 7 March 1988. The single reached No. 90 on the UK Singles Chart.

The 12" featured a cover of the Smiths' "Heaven Knows I'm Miserable Now" as a bonus track. This would eventually be released on the CD version of the album Laughter, Tears and Rage three months later.

== Critical reception ==
David Stubbs from Melody Maker wrote, "Claudia's scratching, clawing, growling vocal sweeps over Thomas Leer's over-developed Europop which almost, but never quite lurches into a HM/disco consensus." Michele Kirsch from NME commented, "Claudia Brucken's peculiar mug graces the walls of London as hubby Paul fades deeper into the woodwork in the wake of Holly Johnson's victory. Meanwhile, back at the synth, Thomas Leer, Andy 'Gang of One' Gill and producer Steve Lipson can do little to prevent Claudia from out Loviching Lene—her voice fed through some nasty Eurotrash compacter. She's like an electro Nico waiting for her sample of Warhol; great intellects could be at work here, but they should be at play."

== Track listing ==
All songs written and composed by Thomas Leer and Claudia Brücken, except where noted.

=== 7" vinyl ===
- UK: ZTT / IMM 2

Side one
No.	Title	Length
1.	"I Can't Escape from You" (Single version)	3:05

Side two
No.	Title	Length
1.	"Dear Life"	3:19

=== 12" vinyl ===
- UK: ZTT / TIMM 2

Side one
No.	Title	Length
1.	"I Can't Escape from You" (Love & Hate)	7:24

Side two
No.	Title	Writer(s)	Length
1.	"Heaven Knows I'm Miserable Now"	Morrissey, Johnny Marr	3:53
2.	"(Theme From) I Can't Escape from You"		3:02
3.	"Dear Life"		3:19

=== CD ===
- UK: ZTT / CDIMM 2 (subtitled "Compacted")

No.	Title	Writer(s)	Length
1.	"I Can't Escape from You" (Love & Hate)		7:24
2.	"Heaven Knows I'm Miserable Now"	Morrissey, Marr	3:53
3.	"Dear Life"		3:19
4.	"I Can't Escape from You" (Version)		3:09
