= Snobbery and Decay =

- UK 7" sleeve with pictures of Quentin Crisp and Liberace.

Single by Act

from the album Laughter, Tears and Rage
- B-side: "Poison"; "I'd Be Surprisingly Good for You"
- Released: 5 May 1987
- Recorded: February/March 1987
- Studio: Sarm West, London
- Genre: Synthpop
- Length: 4:07
- Label: ZTT
- Songwriter: Act
- Producer: Stephen Lipson

Act singles chronology
"Snobbery and Decay" (1987)	"Absolutely Immune" (1987)

"Snobbery and Decay" is the debut single by Act. It was released by ZTT Records in a number of formats on 5 May 1987 and reached #60 in the UK Singles Chart.

According to Claudia Brücken, "The whole idea was based on a programme called Lifestyles of the Rich and Famous. That was when we discovered how much we wanted to write about that idea and what a great introduction it would be for Thomas and me to have a duet as a first single. Two characters talking about that whole thing."

The orchestral arrangement for "Snobbery and Decay" was made by David Bedford.

A number of remixes were prepared by the producers and appeared across the various formats, the standard extended version titled "Snobbery And Decay (That's Entertainment!)", "Snobbery & Decay (Extended, For Stephanie Beacham)" and "(The Naked Civil) Snobbery & Decay". Further 'Moonlighting' and 'Instant' remixes by Mastermind Herbie appeared only on a promotional 12".

"Snobbery and Decay" was included on the group's sole album Laughter, Tears and Rage, released 7 weeks later. Compared to the single version, the album version adds a minute of instrumental to the end. The B-side "Poison" appears only on CD and cassette formats (not on LP) and is a different mix. Although the album has been reissued twice on CD in different, vastly expanded formats, the 7" versions of "Snobbery and Decay" and "Poison" remain unreleased on an Act CD. The last 4 minutes of the 12" version "Snobbery and Decay (That's Entertainment!)" do contain the 7" version of "Snobbery" – except for the string intro.

The 12" and cassette versions also feature a cover of "I'd Be Surprisingly Good for You" from the musical Evita, chosen according to Thomas Leer, because "we both dislike Andrew Lloyd Webber intensely. We wanted to do something from a musical, something that was crap and that we could make great. It also fitted the idea of the package."

Several different picture sleeves were issued with the various formats, some feature photos of Quentin Crisp, author of "The Naked Civil Servant", and Liberace.

The 12" version "Snobbery and Decay (That's Entertainment!)" includes a sample of Liza Minnelli's dialogue from the 1972 musical film Cabaret, followed by one from American comedian Joan Rivers.

"You've got yours, I've got mine, Obsession, just like Calvin Klein .."

== Track listing ==
All songs written and composed by Thomas Leer and Claudia Brücken, except where noted.

=== 7" vinyl ===
- UK: ZTT / ZTAS 28
- Europe: Island / 109 105

Side one
No.	Title	Length
1.	"Snobbery and Decay" (Single version)	4:07

Side two
No.	Title	Length
1.	"Poison" (Single remix)	3:56

=== Cassette ===
- UK: ZTT / CTIS 28 (titled "Snobbery & Decay (cabaret-cassette)")

No.	Title	Writer(s)	Length
1.	"Snobbery and Decay (That's Entertainment)"		10:05
2.	"I'd Be Surprisingly Good for You"	Andrew Lloyd Webber, Tim Rice	4:09
3.	"Poison" (Single remix)		3:56
4.	"(Theme From) Snobbery and Decay" (Edit)		1:41

=== 12" vinyl ===
Titled "Act present Showtime / Snobbery & Decay (That's entertainment..)

- UK: ZTT / 12ZACT 28 (limited edition in gatefold sleeve)
- UK: ZTT / 12ZTAS 28
- Europe: Island / 609 105
- Spain: Island / 3A 609105

Side one
No.	Title	Length
1.	"Snobbery and Decay (That's Entertainment)" (Edit)	9:48

Side two
No.	Title	Writer(s)	Length
1.	"Poison" (Single remix, early fade)		3:55
2.	"I'd Be Surprisingly Good for You"	Lloyd Webber, Rice	4:09

Titled "Snobbery and Decay (naked civil 12")"

- UK: ZTT / 12 XACT 28 (initial copies came with an Act poster)

Side one
No.	Title	Length
1.	"(The Naked Civil) Snobbery and Decay"	8:54

Side two
No.	Title	Length
1.	"Strong Poison" (Remix)	6:02
2.	"(Theme From) Snobbery and Decay"	3:22

- UK: ZTT / CT 01 (promo only, remixes by Mastermind Herbie)

Side one
No.	Title	Length
1.	"Snobbery and Decay" (Moonlighting Mix)	6:06
2.	"Snobbery and Decay" (Moonlighting Mix 2)	5:58

Side two
No.	Title	Length
1.	"Snobbery and Decay" (Instant)	5:31
2.	"Snobbery and Decay" (Instant 2)	4:19

=== CD ===
Titled "compacted Snobbery & Decay / Emotional highlights from Snobbery & Decay"

- UK: ZTT / CID 28

No.	Title	Writer(s)	Length
1.	"Snobbery and Decay (Extended, for Stephanie Beacham)"		8:31
2.	"I'd Be Surprisingly Good for You"	Lloyd Webber, Rice	4:09
3.	"Poison" (Album version)		3:58
4.	"(Theme From) Snobbery and Decay"		3:25

== Charts ==
Chart (1987)	Peak position
Italy Airplay (Music & Media)	11
