= 1234 (Propaganda album) =

Studio album by Propaganda
- Released: May 1990
- Genre: Synth-pop
- Length: 48:45
- Label: Virgin
- Producer: Ian Stanley, Chris Hughes

Propaganda chronology
Wishful Thinking (1985)	1234 (1990)	Outside World (2002)

Singles from 1234
- 1. "Heaven Give Me Words" Released: 1990; 2. "Your Wildlife" Released: 1990; 3. "Only One Word" Released: 1990; 4. "How Much Love" Released: 1990; 5. "Wound in My Heart" Released: 1991

Professional ratings
Review scores
Source	Rating
Allmusic	3/5 stars

1234 is the second studio album by Propaganda. Released in 1990, Michael Mertens was the only remaining member of the group from their previous album A Secret Wish, though original member Susanne Freytag made a guest appearance on two tracks, and the album includes some songs co-written by Ralf Dörper. New group members included Derek Forbes and Brian McGee, both formerly of Simple Minds and whom had both toured with the first incarnation of the band, and vocalist Betsi Miller. The album was produced by Ian Stanley and Chris Hughes, most notable for their work with Tears For Fears in the 1980s. Hughes and Miller would later marry.

== Production and reception ==
The first single from the album, "Heaven Give Me Words", reached the UK Top 40 and also reached No. 22 on the U.S. Adult Contemporary chart. "Your Wildlife" reached No. 32 on the U.S. Dance Music/Club Play Singles chart. Both songs were co-written by Howard Jones. Another single, "Only One Word" (which featured Pink Floyd guitarist David Gilmour), peaked at No. 71 in the UK.

The album itself peaked at No. 46 on the UK Album Chart.

The cover art is a close-up of part of the sculpture Unique Forms of Continuity in Space by Umberto Boccioni.

== Track listing ==
No.	Title	Writer(s)	Length
1.	"Vicious Circle"	Michael Mertens; Betsi Miller; Derek Forbes; Ralf Dörper	4:54
2.	"Heaven Give Me Words"	Howard Jones; Ian Stanley; Mertens	5:11
3.	"Your Wildlife"	Miller; Mertens; Hughes; Stanley; Jones	6:31
4.	"Only One Word"	Forbes; Mertens; Miller; Dörper	5:51
5.	"How Much Love"	Mertens; Miller; Forbes	5:51
6.	"Vicious" (reprise)	Mertens; Miller; Forbes; Dörper	1:36
7.	"Ministry of Fear"	Mertens; Forbes	7:18
8.	"Wound in My Heart"	Forbes; Mertens; Miller; Dörper	5:41
9.	"La Carne, la Morte e il Diavolo (Note: English: "Flesh, Death and the Devil")"	Mertens	5:52

== Personnel ==
Propaganda:

- Betsi Miller – vocals
- Michael Mertens – keyboards, electronics
- Derek Forbes – bass guitar
- Ian Stanley – Fairlight synthesizer
- Chris Hughes – computer
- Brian McGee – drums

Supporting musicians:

- Neil Taylor, Andy Ross, David Gilmour – guitar
- Ross Cullum – rhythm guitar
- David Paton, Pino Palladino – bass guitar
- Jürgen Dahmen – keyboards
- Andy Richards, Blue Weaver – Fairlight synthesizer
- Simon Clark – Hammond organ, keyboards
- Greg Hawkes – synthesizer
- Mel Collins – soprano saxophone
- Alan Lee Kirkendale – trumpet
- Susanne Freytag – vocals ("Vicious Circle", "Ministry of Fear")
- Howard Jones, Tessa Niles – backing vocals
