= P4F =

P4F (Propaganda for Frankie) was an Italian music project, consisting of Marco Sabiu and Massimo Carpani. Their Italo disco medley of "P:Machinery" and "Relax" was a number 16 hit in Germany in the summer of 1986.
