= Laughter, Tears and Rage =

Studio album by Act
- Released: 27 June 1988
- Recorded: 1987–1988
- Genre: Synth-pop
- Length: 57:30
- Label: ZTT
- Producer: Act; Stephen Lipson

Singles from Laughter, Tears and Rage
- 1. "Snobbery and Decay" Released: 5 May 1987; 2. "Absolutely Immune" Released: 7 September 1987; 3. "Chance" Released: February 1988; 4. "I Can't Escape from You" Released: 7 March 1988

Laughter, Tears and Rage – The Anthology
- Cover of the box set released in 2004

Professional ratings
Review scores
Source	Rating
AllMusic	3/5 stars

Laughter, Tears and Rage was the sole album produced by Act—the short musical collaboration between Thomas Leer and ex-Propaganda vocalist Claudia Brücken. Originally scheduled to be titled Name Dropping: Songs for Young Sinners, it was released on 27 June 1988 by ZTT Records. The album was deleted by ZTT in the early 90s. It was eventually reissued on CD in 2004, as a one disc album and as a three disc box set entitled Laughter, Tears and Rage – The Anthology.

Like most ZTT releases, the LP and CD releases differed quite a lot in track listing. The LP and cassette were both released as 12 tracks, while the CD was 14. However, a number of tracks were exclusive to each format. "Short Story" and "Theme from Laughter" were LP only, while "Poison" and "Bloodrush" were issued only on CD and cassette, and "Heaven Knows I'm Miserable Now" and "The 3rd Planet" were CD only.

== Singles ==
The album featured three singles, "Snobbery and Decay", "Absolutely Immune" and "I Can't Escape from You". None of these set the charts alight with lead single "Snobbery and Decay" reaching #60 upon release. A fourth single, "Chance" was withdrawn the day of release due to unauthorised samples.

== 2004 reissue ==
A reissue of Laughter, Tears and Rage was released on 19 January 2004, with tracks that were released on the LP and CD version of the album, along with a number of remixes and B-sides. Also a 3-CD box set version was released, titled Laughter, Tears and Rage – The Anthology, comprising almost four hours of material. Apart from the reissued album on the first disc, a second disc anthologised the extended mixes, while a third disc features a collection of rare and unreleased remixes, and an unreleased track: "Body Electric".

== Love & Hate (2015) ==
The album was reissued in a further different configuration in 2015 under the title Love & Hate: A Compact Introduction. The release consisted of a "director's cut" of the album (comprising all of the original tracks plus "Body Electric", in a different order) on one CD, with various remixes and B-sides on a second CD.

== Track listings ==
All songs written and composed by Thomas Leer and Claudia Brücken, except where noted

=== LP (1988) ===
- UK: ZTT / ZQLP1

Side one
No.	Title	Length
1.	"Absolutely Immune"	4:37
2.	"Chance"	4:22
3.	"Laughter"	3:58
4.	"I Can't Escape from You"	3:06
5.	"Short Story"	0:32
6.	"Under the Nights of Germany"	4:35

Side two
No.	Title	Writer(s)	Length
1.	"Gestures"		4:00
2.	"A Friendly Warning"	Leer; Brücken; Michael Dempsey	3:25
3.	"Certified"		4:30
4.	"Where Love Lies Bleeding"		3:20
5.	"Theme from Laughter"		1:02
6.	"Snobbery and Decay"		4:05

Tracks A5 and B5 are listed on the labels only.

=== CD (1988) ===
- UK: ZTT / ZQCD1

No.	Title	Writer(s)	Length
1.	"Absolutely Immune"		4:38
2.	"Chance"		4:22
3.	"Laughter"		3:58
4.	"I Can't Escape from You"		3:06
5.	"Poison"		3:59
6.	"Under the Nights of Germany"		4:35
7.	"Heaven Knows I'm Miserable Now"	Morrissey; Johnny Marr	3:53
8.	"The 3rd Planet"		4:26
9.	"Gestures"		4:01
10.	"Bloodrush"		4:12
11.	"A Friendly Warning"	Leer; Brücken; Dempsey	3:25
12.	"Certified"		4:30
13.	"Where Love Lies Bleeding"		3:20
14.	"Snobbery and Decay"		5:06

=== Cassette (1988) ===
- UK: ZTT / ZQMC1

Side one
No.	Title	Length
1.	"Absolutely Immune"
2.	"Chance"
3.	"Laughter"
4.	"I Can't Escape from You"
5.	"Poison"
6.	"Under the Nights of Germany"

Side two
No.	Title	Writer(s)	Length
1.	"Gestures"
2.	"Bloodrush"
3.	"A Friendly Warning"	Leer; Brücken; Dempsey
4.	"Certified"
5.	"Where Love Lies Bleeding"
6.	"Snobbery and Decay"

=== CD (2004) ===
- UK: ZTT / ZTT185CD

No.	Title	Writer(s)	Length
1.	"Absolutely Immune"		4:37
2.	"Chance"		4:08
3.	"Laughter"		3:58
4.	"I Can't Escape from You"		3:07
5.	"Short Story (Thinker)"		0:32
6.	"Poison"		3:55
7.	"Under the Nights of Germany"		4:31
8.	"Heaven Knows I'm Miserable Now"	Morrissey; Marr	3:53
9.	"The 3rd Planet"		4:23
10.	"Gestures"		4:00
11.	"Bloodrush"		4:12
12.	"A Friendly Warning"	Leer; Brücken; Dempsey	3:23
13.	"Certified"		4:27
14.	"Where Love Lies Bleeding"		3:20
15.	"(Theme From) Laughter"		1:05
16.	"Snobbery and Decay"		5:04
17.	"I'd Be Surprisingly Good for You"	Andrew Lloyd Webber; Tim Rice	4:07
18.	"(Theme From) Snobbery and Decay"		3:22
19.	"Absolutely Immune (Seven Inch Mix)"		3:21
20.	"White Rabbit"	Grace Slick	2:30
21.	"Dear Life"		3:19
22.	"(Theme From) I Can't Escape from You"		3:04

=== Box set (2004) ===
- UK: ZTT / ZTT185CDX

Disc one: "(More) Laughter, Tears and Rage"

Same tracks as 2004 CD.

Disc two: "Name Dropping (Songs from Beyond the Me-decade)"
No.	Title	Length
1.	"Snobbery and Decay (That's Entertainment!)"	9:48
2.	"Absolutely Immune (Extended Version)"	6:14
3.	"Chance (Throbbin' Mix)"	7:10
4.	"Winner 88 (Extended)"	6:19
5.	"I Can't Escape from You (Love and Hate)"	7:22
6.	"Snobbery and Decay (Extended, for Stephanie Beacham)"	8:31
7.	"Strong Poison"	6:02
8.	"Absolutely Immune II (Trevor's Twelve Inch Mix)"	5:37
9.	"States of Logic"	5:04
10.	"(We Give You Another) Chance"	4:20
11.	"(The Naked Civil) Snobbery and Decay"	8:52

Disc three: "That's Entertainment! (Plundering the Vaults)"
No.	Title	Writer(s)	Length
1.	"Laughter (Seven Inch Mix)"		3:49
2.	"Chance (Seven Inch Mix)"		4:01
3.	"Heaven Knows I'm Miserable Now (Lucky's Skank 2)"	Morrissey; Marr	3:51
4.	"Absolutely Immune (Take 4)"		4:02
5.	"(Alternative) Gestures"		3:49
6.	"Under the Nights of Germany (Trial Edit)"		3:57
7.	"Body Electric"		3:44
8.	"Heaven Knows I'm Miserable Now (Lucky's Skank 1)"	Morrissey; Marr	3:51
9.	"Laughter (Instrumental Seven Inch Mix)"		4:14
10.	"Absolutely Immune (Instrumental)"		3:27
11.	"Certified (Instrumental)"		4:27
12.	"Under the Nights of Germany (Instrumental)"		4:52
13.	"Gestures (Instrumental)"		3:49
14.	"I'd Be Surprisingly Instrumental for You"	Lloyd Webber; Rice	4:08
15.	"Winner 88 (Instrumental)"		3:27
16.	"3rd Planet (Altered)"		4:23
17.	"Bloodrush (Silent)"		4:10
18.	"Gestures (Improvised)"		10:12

== Personnel ==
Act

- Thomas Leer – keyboards, vocals
- Claudia Brücken – vocals

Additional musicians

- Andy Gill
- Betsy Cook
- Luís Jardim
- Michael Dempsey
- Neil Hubbard
- Pablo Cook
- Phil Palmer
- Chris Senior – piano on "Theme from Laughter"
- Casbah – scat on "Heaven Knows I'm Miserable Now" (credited to Lucky Gordon on box set)
- David Bedford – string arrangements on "Snobbery and Decay"
