= Onetwo (band) =

English synthpop duo (2000–2013)

- Genres: Synth-pop
- Years active: 2000–2013
- Label: There(there)
- Past members: Claudia Brücken; Paul Humphreys
- Website: Onetwo at There(there)

Onetwo were an English synth-pop duo formed in 2000 by singer Claudia Brücken (Propaganda) and keyboardist/singer Paul Humphreys (Orchestral Manoeuvres in the Dark). Their collaboration had no name until 2004.

== History ==
Brücken and Humphreys met in the early 1980s and became romantically involved in 1996. The two started working together on material for a planned Propaganda album, but when the Propaganda reunion fell through, the pair concentrated on working on their own songs. In 2000 the duo toured the United States, where they played songs by both OMD and Propaganda, along with some new material.

After four years of writing the duo finally recorded a five-track EP entitled Item, released in June 2004 via their own label, There(there). They also gave their first live performance as Onetwo at the Carling Academy Islington in London on 30 September 2004.

In 2006, they performed live at Leicester Cathedral in August and at the London venue Too2Much in November. This was followed by a three-date Central/South American tour the same month. Onetwo's debut studio album, Instead, was released in February 2007 by There(there). In April, Onetwo toured Germany. Later that year they supported Erasure and the Human League.

In March 2013, Brücken and Humphreys ceased living and working together.

== Discography ==
=== Studio albums ===
Instead (2007)

- 01 - The Theory of Everything Part 1
- 02 - The Theory of Everything Part 2
- 03 - Sequential
- 04 - Home (Tonight)
- 05 - Signals
- 06 - Have a Cigar
- 07 - I Don't Blame You
- 08 - Cloud Nine
  - Guitar – Martin L. Gore
  - Guitar [Extra] – Rupert Webster
  - Keyboards [Extra], Electronics – Chuck Norman
  - Keyboards [Extra], Programmed By – Jon Russell
  - Written-By – Gore
- 09 - Anonymous
- 10 - Heaven
- 11 - Kein Anschlu?
- 12 - The Weakness in Me
- 13 - A Vision in the Sky

=== EPs ===
Item (2004)

- 01 - Sister
- 02 - Cloud 9
- 03 - Element of Truth
- 04 - Signals
- 05 - One and Only (Sister)

=== Singles ===
- "Cloud Nine" (2007)
