= Andy Bell (singer) =

English singer and songwriter (born 1964)

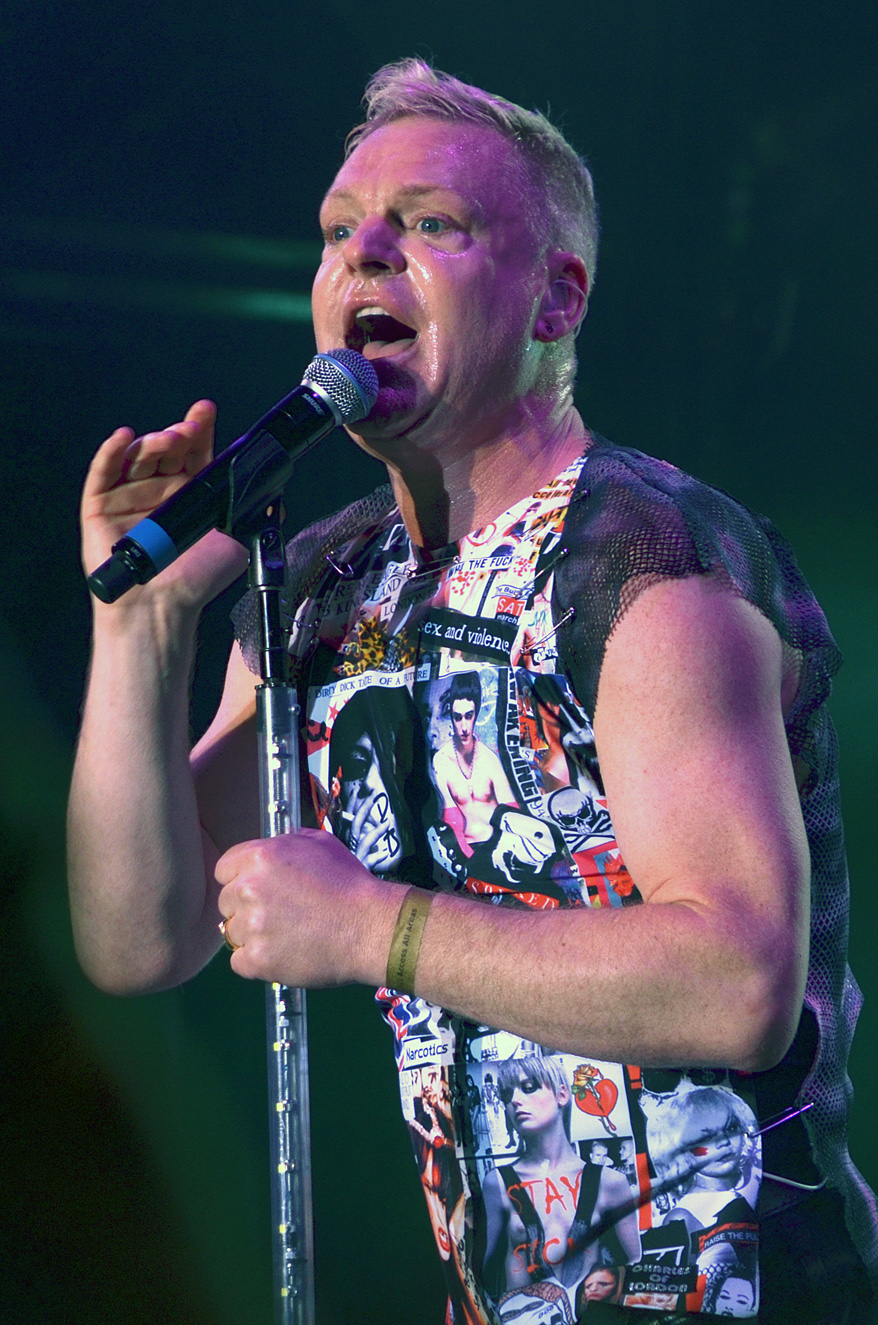
- Bell performing with Erasure in 2011

Background information
- Born: Andrew Ivan Bell; 25 April 1964 (age 62)
- Origin: Dogsthorpe, Peterborough, England
- Genres: Synth-pop; electropop; dance
- Occupations: Singer; songwriter; keyboardist; remixer; DJ
- Years active: 1983–present
- Labels: Mute; Sanctuary; Ministry of Pop
- Member of: Erasure
- Spouse: Stephen Moss (m. 2013)
- Website: andybell.com

Andrew Ivan Bell (born 25 April 1964) is an English singer and songwriter. He is best known as the lead vocalist of the synth-pop duo Erasure. The band achieved mainstream success (receiving a Brit Award for British Group) and Bell has been described as a gay icon.

His solo career includes the studio albums Electric Blue (2005), Non-Stop (2010), iPop (2014), and Ten Crowns (2025).

== Early life ==
Bell learned to sing aged 7 to 8, in the choir at Dogsthorpe Junior School in Dogsthorpe, Peterborough. After passing his Eleven-plus, Bell's education continued at the King's School in the city. He listened to bands such as OMD and Japan during his teens.

== Career ==
In 1985, during a period in which he worked selling women's shoes and was performing in a band called the Void, he responded to a newspaper advertisement for a singer, and was successful in his audition with Vince Clarke, and together they formed the group Erasure.

Bell sang the role of Montresor in the opera The Fall of the House of Usher by Peter Hammill and Judge Smith, released in 1991 and reissued with a new recording in 1999.

Bell's first solo studio album was announced in July 2005. He signed a worldwide solo recording contract with Sanctuary Records, and announced details of his debut album, released on 3 October 2005 and entitled Electric Blue. The album featured fourteen tracks, including three duets, with Claudia Brücken of Propaganda and Jake Shears of Scissor Sisters.

The first single, "Crazy", released on 26 September 2005, included club remixes from his Erasure partner Vince Clarke, plus Cicada, MHC and King Roc. Electric Blue was co-written and recorded throughout 2004 and 2005 with Manhattan Clique (Philip Larsen and Chris Smith) who have worked with Erasure, Moby, the B-52s, Stereophonics and Goldfrapp.

Bell released his second solo studio album, Non-Stop, on 7 June 2010. It was co-written and co-produced by Bell and Pascal Gabriel, who previously remixed "It Doesn't Have to Be" for Erasure. It also features a collaboration with Perry Farrell of Jane's Addiction.

Using the pseudonym Mimó, Bell released two Pascal Gabriel-produced singles on Mute Records: "Running Out" (2009) and "Will You Be There?" (2010) prior to his second solo album. The name, used as a "tribute to good friend Tomeau Mimó", was not used on any subsequent solo releases, as a legal block was issued against Bell by another artist already using the Mimó name. Both songs appear on Non-Stop and have since been re-branded as Andy Bell.

In June 2011, he appeared on the second season of ITV series Popstar to Operastar and finished in fifth place.

On 26 July 2023, Claire Richards released a cover of the 1978 ABBA single "Summer Night City", in collaboration with Bell on co-lead vocals, as the second single from Richards' second studio album Euphoria.

== Personal life ==
Bell is openly gay. His long-term partner, Paul M. Hickey, died on 11 April 2012 at the age of 62. In January 2013, Bell married Stephen Moss.

On 17 December 2004, Bell publicly announced that he has been HIV positive since 1998. In a 2007 interview, he remarked that there is a complacency among gay men about HIV:

There are definitely HIV-positive people who meet other HIV-positive men, and like still having unprotected sex. I think it must be quite hard for young gay men because there is so much for them now to do — there are so many saunas and stuff like that for them to go to, and it's so easy to get it.

Bell has avascular necrosis. He has had both hips replaced, which keeps him from "pogoing around" in more recent performances.

== Solo discography ==
=== Albums ===
- 2005: Electric Blue (SANCD382) – UK No. 119, U.S. Electronic Albums No. 12
- 2010: Non-Stop – UK No. 134, UK Dance Albums No. 12
- 2025: Ten Crowns – UK Official Charts No. 14

=== Shelter featuring Andy Bell albums ===
- 2014: iPop with Shelter (CD/digital) – iTunes UK Pop Album Chart No. 47
  - 2015: iPop Deluxe with Shelter (CD/vinyl/digital)

=== Torsten stage and music series and remixes ===
- 2014: Torsten the Bareback Saint (CD, hardback book)
- 2015: Variance – The 'Torsten the Bareback Saint' Remixes (CD/digital)
- 2016: Torsten the Beautiful Libertine (CD/digital)
- 2016: Variance – 'The Torsten the Beautiful Libertine' Remixes (CD/digital)
- 2019: Torsten in Queereteria (CD/digital)

=== Singles ===
- 2005: "Crazy" – UK No. 35, U.S. Dance No. 3
- 2006: "I'll Never Fall in Love Again" – UK No. 96
- 2009: "Running Out" (as Mimó)
- 2010: "Will You Be There?" (as Mimó) – U.S. Dance No. 27
- 2010: "Call on Me"
- 2010: "Non-Stop"
- 2013: "Breathing Love" (with Isaac Junkie) (CD Part 1/CD Part 2)
- 2014: "Aftermath (Here We Go)" (with Dave Aude) – U.S. Dance No. 1
- 2014: "Beautiful" (with Shelter)
- 2014: "I Don't Like"
- 2014: "Friend" (with Shelter)
- 2014: "Fountain of Youth"
- 2015: "Weston-Super-Mare"
- 2016: "True Original" (with Dave Aude)
- 2016: "My Precious One"
- 2016: "Queercore" (Matt Pop remix)
- 2016: "We Were Singing Along to Liza" (Shelter remix)
- 2017: "Runaway" (with Dave Aude)
- 2023: "Summer Night City" (with Claire Richards)
- 2025: "Don't Cha Know"
- 2025: "Heart's a Liar" (featuring Debbie Harry)

=== Remixes ===
- 1994: Sandra Bernhard - "You Make Me Feel (Mighty Real)" (Frisco Disco Mix - Mixed by Andy Bell, Gareth Jones)
- 2005: Goldfrapp - “Ooh La La” (When Andy Bell Met Manhattan Clique Mix)
- 2008: Yazoo – "Nobody's Diary" (Andy Bell & JC Remix)

== See also ==
- List of synth-pop artists
