= Act (band) =

Synthpop group (1987–1988)

- Origin: Glasgow, Scotland; West Germany (Claudia Brücken)
- Genre: Synth-pop
- Years active: 1987–1988
- Label: ZTT
- Past members: Thomas Leer; Claudia Brücken

Act were a short-lived synth-pop group signed to ZTT Records in the late 1980s, and comprising Scottish musician Thomas Leer and German ex-Propaganda vocalist Claudia Brücken. Besides synthpop and disco, the group were also influenced by psychedelic rock and musical theatre. Lyrically, their songs tended to be concerned with decadence and moral bankruptcy. The band dissolved shortly after the release of their first album Laughter, Tears and Rage in 1988.

== Discography ==
All albums and singles were released by ZTT Records.

=== Albums ===
- Laughter, Tears and Rage (1988, reissued in 2004 as CD and a 3CD box set)
- Act - Love & Hate: A Compact Introduction (2015, a retrospective 2-CD 30-track album)

=== Singles ===
- "Snobbery and Decay" (1987) UK No. 60, Italy No. 38
- "Absolutely Immune" (1987)
- "Chance" (1988) (single withdrawn prior to release, due to copyright issues surrounding an ABBA sample)
- "I Can't Escape from You" (1988)
