= Ten Crowns =

2025 studio album by Andy Bell

Studio album by Andy Bell
- Released: 2 May 2025
- Studio: Maze (Atlanta)
- Genre: Dance; Eurodisco; gospel
- Length: 36:20
- Label: Crown
- Producer: Dave Audé

Andy Bell chronology
Non-Stop (2010)	Ten Crowns (2025)

Singles from Ten Crowns
- 1. "Breaking Thru The Interstellar" Released: 3 February 2025; 2. "Don't Cha Know" Released: 18 February 2025; 3. "Dance For Mercy" Released: 19 March 2025; 4. "Heart's A Liar" Released: 22 April 2025; 5. "Xanadu" Released: 7 October 2025

The Crown Jewels

Box set by Andy Bell
- Released: 12 December 2025
- Genre: Dance; Electronica; Pop
- Label: Crown

Andy Bell chronology
'Ten Crowns' (2025)	The Crown Jewels (2025)

Ten Crowns is the third studio album by English singer Andy Bell. It was released on 2 May 2025, by Crown Recordings, in CD, LP, cassette and digital formats. On 12 December 2025, a limited-edition deluxe CD box set titled The Crown Jewels was released, comprising an expanded edition of the album, a disc of remixes by various artists, a disc of extended versions mixed by Dave Audé, and a disc of live recordings; the release was limited to 4,000 copies.

== Background ==
Noted as a dance album with elements of Eurodisco and gospel music, Ten Crowns is the first album by Bell in fifteen years, since Non-Stop. Featuring ten songs with a total runtime of approximately thirty-six minutes, it was produced by Grammy-winning musician Dave Audé and recorded in a studio in Nashville. The lead single of the album, "Don't Cha Know", was released on 18 February 2025.

== Reception ==
Professional ratings
Aggregate scores
Source	Rating
Metacritic	71/100
Review scores
Source	Rating
AllMusic	3.5/5 stars
MusicOMH	3/5 stars
Record Collector	3/5 stars
Spill	4.5/5 stars

Ten Crowns received generally positive reviews from music critics. At Metacritic, which assigns a normalised rating out of 100 to reviews from mainstream critics, the album received an average score of 71, based on four reviews.

Marcy Donelson of AllMusic remarked, "Often earnest, anguished, and euphoric, Ten Crowns delivers the catharsis while keeping it real." MusicOMH gave the album a rating of three stars, stating "Yet while this never quite touches the highs that Erasure can produce, there's enough moments on Ten Crowns to convince that Bell and Aude make a good partnership for when Vince Clarke wants a rest." Spill assigned the album a rating of four and a half out of five and described it as "a well produced, beautiful album" and "a brilliant accomplishment for Bell and Audé." David Pollock of Record Collector rated the album three stars and stated, "Yet there are interesting things going on between the lyrical lines here, as love, sex, religious salvation and sin clash on "Dance for Mercy", "Dawn of Heaven's Gate" and the pop-orchestral "Thank You"." The Quietus wrote, "Bell has made an album that gently expands the palette of what he's known for, but also allows him to shine as himself rather than as one half of pop's greatest odd couple."

== Track listing ==
All lyrics are written by Andrew Ivan Bell, except "Heart's a Liar" (written with Deborah Harry); all music is composed by Bell and David P. Audé, except "Heart's a Liar" (composed with Harry, Luciana Caporaso, and Nick Clow) and "Put Your Empathy on Ice" (composed with Sisely Treasure).

Ten Crowns – Standard edition
No.	Title	Length
1.	"Breaking Thru the Interstellar"	3:26
2.	"Lies So Deep" (featuring Sarah Potenza)	3:36
3.	"Heart's a Liar" (featuring Debbie Harry)	3:30
4.	"For Today"	3:11
5.	"Dance for Mercy"	3:59
6.	"Don't Cha Know"	3:35
7.	"Dawn of Heaven's Gate"	3:56
8.	"Godspell"	3:22
9.	"Put Your Empathy on Ice"	4:26
10.	"Thank You"	3:18
Total length:		36:23

Ten Crowns – Expanded edition
No.	Title	Length
11.	"Breaking Thru the Interstellar" (extended)	4:44
12.	"Don't Cha Know" (extended)	4:43
13.	"Dance for Mercy" (extended)	5:00
14.	"Heart's a Liar" (extended; featuring Debbie Harry)	4:59
Total length:		55:51

Ten Crowns – 2CD deluxe edition
No.	Title	Length
11.	"Ten Crowns" (Dave Audé continuous DJ mix)	37:20
Total length:		73:43

== The Crown Jewels ==
On 12 December 2025, Bell released a limited-edition deluxe CD box set titled The Crown Jewels, expanding upon Ten Crowns. The set was limited to 4,000 copies and includes four compact discs featuring an expanded version of the album, remixes by various artists, extended versions mixed by Dave Audé, and live recordings of material from the album, as well as a booklet containing additional photos and brand new sleeve notes. A business-card size piece of card was included with the wording "ANDY BELL // THE CROWN JEWELS // You are the proud owner of limited edition number xxxx".

=== Box set contents ===
Disc	Title	Description
Disc one	Ten Crowns (expanded edition)	Expanded version of the original studio album, including additional tracks not present on the standard release.
Disc two	Remixes	Remix versions of album tracks by various artists.
Disc three	Extended versions	Extended and reworked versions of the original album, mixed by Dave Audé.
Disc four	Live recordings	Live performances of songs from Ten Crowns.

==== CD1 – Ten Crowns (Deluxe Expanded Edition) ====
Ten Crowns – Deluxe expanded edition
No.	Title	Length
1.	"Breaking Thru the Interstellar"	3:27
2.	"Lies So Deep" (featuring Sarah Potenza)	3:37
3.	"Heart’s a Liar" (featuring Debbie Harry)	3:30
4.	"For Today"	3:11
5.	"Dance for Mercy"	3:59
6.	"Don't Cha Know"	3:35
7.	"Dawn of Heaven’s Gate"	3:56
8.	"Godspell"	3:23
9.	"Put Your Empathy on Ice"	4:27
10.	"Thank You"	3:19
11.	"Runaway"	4:25
12.	"The Calming" (featuring Sophie Ellis-Bextor)	3:25
13.	"Xanadu"	3:53
14.	"The Chance Won’t Come Again" (featuring Tim Rice-Oxley)	3:35
Total length:		51:33

==== CD2 – Ten Crowns (Remixes) ====
Ten Crowns – Remixes
No.	Title	Remixed By	Length
1.	"Breaking Thru the Interstellar (Dave Audé Remix)"	Dave Audé	4:23
2.	"Lies So Deep (James Hurr Remix)" (featuring Sarah Potenza)	James Hurr	3:24
3.	"Heart’s a Liar (Dave Audé Disco Remix)" (featuring Debbie Harry)	Dave Audé	5:31
4.	"For Today (KNIGHTS Remix)"	KNIGHT$	3:52
5.	"Dance for Mercy (Vince Clarke Remix)"	Vince Clarke	4:21
6.	"Don't Cha Know (Hifi Sean Cosmic Disco Remix)"	Hifi Sean	2:57
7.	"Dawn of Heaven’s Gate (Cosmic Gate Remix)"	Cosmic Gate	4:13
8.	"Godspell (Heavy Halo Remix)"	Heavy Halo	3:23
9.	"Put Your Empathy on Ice (Shiny Toy Guns Remix)"	Shiny Toy Guns	4:28
10.	"Thank You (Luke Million Remix)"	Luke Million	4:22
Total length:			40:54

==== CD3 – Ten Crowns (Extended Versions) ====
Note: all tracks are extended mixes of the original album by Dave Audé

Ten Crowns – Extended versions
No.	Title	Length
1.	"Breaking Thru the Interstellar (Extended)"	4:45
2.	"Lies So Deep (Extended)" (featuring Sarah Potenza)	4:18
3.	"Heart’s a Liar (Extended)" (featuring Debbie Harry)	4:59
4.	"For Today (Extended)"	4:03
5.	"Dance for Mercy (Extended)"	5:00
6.	"Don't Cha Know (Extended)"	4:43
7.	"Dawn of Heaven’s Gate (Extended)"	5:20
8.	"Godspell (Extended)"	4:16
9.	"Put Your Empathy on Ice (Extended)"	5:29
10.	"Thank You (Extended)"	4:30
Total length:		47:23

==== CD4 – Ten Crowns (Live) ====
Ten Crowns – Live
No.	Title	Length
1.	"Breaking Thru the Interstellar (Live)"	4:23
2.	"Don’t Cha Know (Live)"	4:18
3.	"Heart’s a Liar (Live)"	3:59
4.	"Godspell (Live)"	3:32
5.	"Xanadu (Live)"	3:59
6.	"For Today (Live)"	3:31
7.	"Dance for Mercy (Live)"	4:02
8.	"Put Your Empathy on Ice (Live)"	4:41
9.	"Thank You (Live)"	3:53
Total length:		36:18

== Personnel ==
Credits adapted from the album's liner notes and Tidal.

- Andy Bell – lead vocals, backing vocals
- Dave Audé – production (all tracks), mixing (track 10)
- Stefan Tanner – mastering
- Samuel Wills – mixing (tracks 1, 3, 5)
- Loren Moore – mixing (tracks 2, 4, 6–9)
- Devonne Fowlkes – backing vocals (tracks 1, 3, 10)
- Harmonie Hall – backing vocals (tracks 1, 10)
- Joshua Lutz – guitars (tracks 1, 2)
- Sarah Potenza – featured vocals (track 2)
- Vince Clarke – additional synthesizers, sounds, guitars (track 2)
- Debbie Harry – featured vocals (tracks 3, 14)
- Kiley Phillips – backing vocals (track 3)
- Luciana Caporaso – backing vocals (track 3)
- Billy Mohler – bass guitar (track 3)
- Jerry Fuentes – guitars (track 3)
- Dave Audé – backing vocals (track 5)
- Tomas – backing vocals (track 7)
- Sisely Treasure – backing vocals (track 9)
- Paul A. Taylor – art direction, design
- Louise Hendy – design
- Sean Black – photography
