= Adrenalin/Distant Dreams (Part Two) =

1980 single by Throbbing Gristle

"Adrenalin"

Single by Throbbing Gristle
- B-side: "Distant Dreams (Part Two)"
- Released: 23 October 1980
- Genre: Industrial, electropop
- Label: Industrial
- Producer(s): Throbbing Gristle

Throbbing Gristle singles chronology
"'Subhuman / Something Came Over Me'" (1980)	"Adrenalin" (1980)	"'Discipline'" (1981)

Cover Art (Side B)

Adrenalin/Distant Dreams (Part Two) is a single by Throbbing Gristle. It was simultaneously released with Subhuman/Something Came Over Me. It was sold in a camouflage printed plastic bag and reached No. 26 in the UK Indie Chart.

== Artwork ==
As with Subhuman/Something Came Over Me, the single contains two distinctive black-and-white photographs, the first of a storefront and the second of an unidentified interior. A 'TG' label is printed on both sides, with each side's respective song and an Industrial Records catalog number. The messages "Second Attempt" and "rident Rool" are scratched in on the A-side.

== Track listing ==
Side A:

1. "Adrenalin" – 3:59

Side B:

1. "Distant Dreams (Part Two)" – 5:30

== Charts ==
Chart (1980)	Peak position
UK Indie Chart	26
