= Discipline (Throbbing Gristle song) =

1981 single by Throbbing Gristle

Single by Throbbing Gristle
- Released: 3 June 1981
- Genre: Industrial
- Label: Fetish FET006
- Songwriter(s): Peter Christopherson, Cosey Fanni Tutti, Chris Carter, Genesis P-Orridge
- Producer(s): Throbbing Gristle

Throbbing Gristle singles chronology
"'Adrenalin/Distant Dreams (Part Two)'" (1980)	"Discipline" (1981)

"Discipline" is a song by the English electronic group Throbbing Gristle.

== Single ==
The "Discipline" single features two versions of the title track, recorded in Berlin and Manchester. The center labels are cream with black printing, and a glossy picture sleeve depicts the band standing outside the ex-Nazi Ministry of Propaganda in Berlin, and the other side shows Val Denham holding a Hitler Youth dagger centre back. The words "Techno Primitive" were scratched on side A and "Psykick Youth Squad" on side B. Both tracks were later released on the CD version of 20 Jazz Funk Greats.

The word "Techno Primitive" was later used by electronic duo Chris & Cosey for their 1985 album of the same name, while the name "Psykick Youth Squad" can be seen as a reference to the later band Psychic TV, both groups made up of ex-Throbbing Gristle members.

=== Track listing ===
Side A:

1. "Discipline (Manchester)" - 8:06

Side B:

1. "Discipline (Berlin)" - 10:45

== Song ==
"Discipline" is considered to be Throbbing Gristle's most infamous song. First played at the SO36 Club in Berlin (as documented on the single), it was at first entirely improvised, based upon a topic suggestion given by Cosey Fanni Tutti before the show. The song is driven by a minimal, pulsing synthesizer drumbeat, over which Genesis P-Orridge would sing lyrics surrounding the concept of discipline, slowly introducing other musical elements, such as electric bass and walls of guitar or synth noise. After Berlin, it was played at nearly every Throbbing Gristle show until the group's demise. Often it would range in length from eight to 12 minutes, although it could be stretched out much longer. A version from one of the last Throbbing Gristle shows at the Lyceum in London was over 30 minutes long, as documented on the bootleg Once Upon a Time and the VHS release Destiny.

The song was covered by Marc Almond and Friends on a flexi disc that was issued free with an issue of Flexipop magazine. He performed it solo on Siouxsie and the Banshees' Join Hands tour at the Hammersmith Odeon as an extended version forming the entirety of his set, which preceded the Cure, the main support band. "Discipline" was also covered by Boyd Rice and by German synthpop group Propaganda as "Disziplin."

== Charts ==
Chart (1981)	Peak position
UK Indie Chart	43

== Extended links ==
- Discogs entry
