= Outside World =

Compilation album by Propaganda
- Released: July 2, 2002
- Genre: Synthpop, new wave
- Length: 78:18
- Label: ZTT
- Producer: Trevor Horn, Steve Lipson

Propaganda chronology
1234 (1990)	Outside World (2002)	Propaganda (2024)

Professional ratings
Review scores
Source	Rating
Allmusic	3/5 stars

Outside World is a 2002 compilation album by Propaganda. The album collects remixes, B-sides and extra tracks released on 7-inch and 12-inch records, cassette singles and white-label DJ vinyl pressings during the band's tenure on the ZTT label in 1984/85. It was released as a CD and as a CD with a bonus DVD containing promotional videos and TV commercials.

== Track listing CD ==
1. "Das Testament des Dr. Mabuse (13th Life Mix)" – 6:34
2. "Lied" – 2:48
3. "p:Machinery (Beta Mix)" – 9:33
4. "Duel (Bitter Sweet)" – 7:38
5. "The Lesson" – 4:18
6. "Frozen Faces (12" Version)" – 5:30
7. "Jewel" – 6:54
8. "Complete Machinery" – 10:56
9. "Das Testament des Dr. Mabuse (DJ Promo Version)" – 9:52
10. "Femme Fatale (The Woman with the Orchid)" – 3:34
11. "Echo of Frozen Faces" – 10:28

Track 9 was originally only previously available as a promotional white-label 12-inch vinyl recording, having never been commercially released prior to its inclusion on this compilation.

The German version of the CD replaces "Complete Machinery" with "p:Machinery Connected", taken directly from a copy of the cassette single. As a result, the sound quality is diminished. Reference to this issue is made in the album's liner notes.

== Track listing bonus DVD ==
1. "Dr. Mabuse" (Version 1)
2. "Dr. Mabuse" (Version 2)

Promotional videos directed by Anton Corbijn. Version 1 is a spectacular black-and-white affair featuring Claudia Brucken being stalked by Mabuse (actor Vladek Sheybal), through a dark and eerie castle full of monks. The second is studio-set, and unlike the previous video features fifth member Michael Mertens and the band's rarely-seen drummer Weet. Highlights include Andreas Thein smashing up a bathtub with hammers.

3. "Duel" (Version 1)
4. "Duel" (Version 2)

Promotional videos directed by John "Scarlet" Davis and Paul Morley. Identical, except that Version 2 features on-screen graphics.

5. "p:Machinery"

Promotional video directed by Zbigniew Rybczyński. Filmed in a Manhattan warehouse, with Claudia performing in front of Ralf, Susanne and Michael, who are strung up on harnesses like puppets, being operated from a gantry above.

6. "Dr Mabuse" (TV commercial)
7. "Duel" (TV commercial)
