= P:Machinery =

"p:Machinery"

Single by Propaganda

from the album A Secret Wish
- B-side: "Frozen Faces"
- Released: 29 July 1985
- Genre: Synth-pop
- Length: 3:49
- Label: ZTT; Island
- Songwriters: Ralf Dörper; Michael Mertens
- Producer: Stephen Lipson

Propaganda singles chronology
"Duel" (1985)	"p:Machinery" (1985)	"p:Machinery (Reactivated)" (1985)

Music video
- "p: Machinery" on YouTube

"p:Machinery" is a song by the German synth-pop band Propaganda, released as the third single from their 1985 debut album A Secret Wish. The song reached the top 10 in various countries across Europe, including France and Italy, but was most successful in Spain, where it peaked at number one in 1986. In the United States, the song reached the top 10 on the dance chart. The opening line for the track was written by David Sylvian, who was approached to produce for the band but ultimately did not.

== Background ==
David Sylvian's contribution as given by Sylvian himself was the following:

"I contributed the keyboard melody and response at the beginning of the 'p-machine' I think the piece was called, plus a few other minor ideas here and there. I can't be more precise as my memory of the sessions aren't clear plus the pieces were recorded over more than once I believe so although the ideas remain my performance of them may not. I did restructure a piece for them arrangement wise…can't think of the title, don't have a copy of the album. It did finally give them a hit single I believe but I wouldn't swear to it."

== Track listings ==
12", "p: Machinery (Polish)", ZTT (UK)/ Island (Europe)

1. "p: Machinery (Polish)" – 9:25
2. "p: Machinery (Passive)" – 3:44
3. "Frozen Faces" – 5:31

7", Island

1. "p: Machinery" – 3:50
2. "Frozen Faces" – 4:22

12", "p: Machinery (Reactivate)", ZTT (UK)/ Island (Spain)

1. "(The Beta Wrap Around Of) p:Machinery" – 10:47
2. "(The Echo Of) Frozen Faces" – 10:22

7", "p: Machinery (Reactivate)", ZTT (UK)/ Island (Spain)

1. "(The Beta Wrap Around Of) p: Machinery" – 4:16
2. "Frozen Faces" – 5:30

12", "p: Machinery (βeta)", ZTT (UK)/ Island (Australia)

1. "p:Machinery (Beta)" – 9:30
2. "Extracts from the Cassette Complete Machinery Including p:Machinery (Passive) and Frozen Faces" – 10:57

Cassette, ZTT Incidental Series, Action Series (UK)

1. "Introduction" – 0:25
2. "p:Machinery (Connected)" – 12:40
3. "Separation" – 0:20
4. "Frozen Faces" – 5:32
5. "Introduction" – 0:25
6. "p:Machinery (Connected)" – 12:40
7. "Separation" – 0:20
8. "Frozen Faces" – 5:32

CD, "P:Machinery (T-Empo Remix)

1. "P:Machinery (Adventurous Edit)" – 3:45
2. "P:Machinery (Passive - Original 7" Mix)" – 3:43
3. "P:Machinery (The Adventure Continues)" – 12:03
4. "P:Machinery (Polish - Original 12" Mix)" – 9:20

Digital download, "P: Machinery (αlpha)", ZTT

1. "P: Machinery" – 3:52
2. "Frozen Faces (αlpha)" – 4:23
3. "P: Machinery (Polish)" – 9:23
4. "P:Machinery (Zbigniew Rybczyński Video Mix)" – 4:36
5. "Frozen Faces (βeta)" – 5:29
6. "P:Machinery (Voiceless)" – 3:48
7. "P:Machinery (αlpha)" – 1:58

"P:Machinery (βeta)", ZTT, The Beast of Propaganda – Chapter Three

1. "Introduction" – 0:26
2. "P:Machinery (Connected)" – 12:41
3. "Separation" – 0:20
4. "Frozen Faces (A Secret Sense of Rhythm)" – 5:08
5. "Frozen Faces (A Secret Sense of Sin)" – 5:29
6. "P:Machinery (Passive)" – 3:44
7. "P:Machinery (βeta)" – 9:32

"P: Machinery (Reactivated)", ZTT

1. "P:Machinery (The Beta Wraparound)" – 10:45
2. "Frozen Faces (The Echo Of...)" – 10:20
3. "P:Machinery (The Beta Wraparound Edit)" – 4:11
4. "Frozen Faces (Βeta)" – 5:29
5. "Disturbdance Seven" – 3:14
6. "P:Machinery (The Voiceless Βeta Wraparound Edit)" – 4:23
7. "Disturbdance One" – 0:11

== Chart performance ==
=== Weekly charts ===
Chart (1985–1986)	Peak position
Belgium (Ultratop 50 Flanders)	9
European Top 100 Singles (Eurotipsheet)	36
France (SNEP)	10
Italy (FIMI)	5
Netherlands (Dutch Top 40)	12
Netherlands (Single Top 100)	9
Spain (AFYVE)	1
Switzerland (Schweizer Hitparade)	29
UK Singles (OCC)	50
US Billboard Hot Dance Club Play	10
US Billboard Hot Dance Music/Maxi-Singles Sales	20
West Germany (GfK)	26

=== Year-end charts ===
Chart (1985)	Position
Europe (European Hot 100)	82
Netherlands (Dutch Top 40)	86
Netherlands (Single Top 100)	81

== See also ==
- List of number-one singles of 1986 (Spain)
