= Wishful Thinking (Propaganda album) =

1985 remix album

Remix album by Propaganda
- Released: 25 November 1985
- Genre: Synthpop
- Length: 41:22
- Label: ZTT
- Producer: Trevor Horn, Stephen Lipson

Propaganda chronology
A Secret Wish (1985)	Wishful Thinking (1985)	1234 (1990)

Wishful Thinking is a 1985 remix album by the synthpop band Propaganda.

== Overview ==
Originally released November 1985, Wishful Thinking was initially put together as a promo for the American club market, composed of remixes of tracks from the album A Secret Wish. It was compiled by Paul Morley and tape operator Bob Kraushaar without input from the group themselves, who objected to its release in Europe.

"Abuse" (in two parts) are remixes of "Dr. Mabuse", "Machined" is a remix of "P:Machinery", "Laughed!" is a remix of "Sorry for Laughing", "Loving" and "Loved" are remixes of "The Murder of Love", "Jewelled" is a hybrid remix of "Duel" and "Jewel", and "Thought" is a short instrumental remix of the group's unreleased cover of Throbbing Gristle's "Discipline".

The painting on the cover was created by the group's singer, Claudia Brücken.

The album's liner notes contain a quote by the German writer and philosopher Goethe: "Und umzuschaffen das Geschaffene, Dass sich's nicht zum Starren waffne, Wirkt ewiges lebendiges Thun." Which translates as follows: "And refashioning the fashioned, lest it stiffen into iron, is work of endless vital activity."

"Abuse" (in a slightly edited form) was used as the opening titles theme for the 1987 John Hughes film Some Kind of Wonderful. The track is not on the film's soundtrack album.

"Jewelled" was used for many years as the theme music for the BBC's Lombard/RAC Rally coverage. The Seven Network in Australia also used the piece as the theme music for all of their motor sports coverage in the late 1980s.

== Releases ==
"Wishful Thinking" was not released on CD in the UK until 1994, when ZTT were reissuing their 1980s back-catalogue to celebrate their 10th anniversary as a label. However, the CD originally made a brief, unpromoted appearance at UK retail in limited quantities in the summer of 1988. Distributed by Island Records, they were marked "For Export Only" and carried the catalogue number ZCIDQ20.

The CD was reissued on the German Repertoire label in 2000 (catalogue number REP 4901), and contained an expanded 6 page booklet featuring an essay by Jerry Ewing on the history of the band.

A remastered CD of Wishful Thinking was released on 4 June 2012, as part of ZTT/Salvo's Element series. It contains six bonus tracks, five of which appear to be "previously unreleased". After the reissue, Superdeluxeedition.com described the original release as "something of a lost synth-pop classic."

Professional ratings
Review scores
Source	Rating
AllMusic	link

== Track listing ==
=== Original track listing ===
A - HERE

1. "Abuse" – 3:26
2. "Machined" – 6:45
3. "Laughed!" – 8:42
4. "Loving" – 0:47

B - THERE

1. "Jewelled" – 7:44
2. "Loved" – 6:42
3. "Abuse" – 4:17
4. "Thought" – 2:39

=== 2012 reissue ===
1. "Abuse"
2. "Machined"
3. "Laughed"
4. "Loving"
5. "Jewelled"
6. "Loved"
7. "Abuse"
8. "Thought"
9. "Strength to Dream (Outtake 04.02.84)"
10. "p:Machinery (The Beta Wraparound)"
11. "The Murder of Love (Murderous Instrumental)"
12. "Dr Mabuse (Outtake 24.04.85)"
13. "Frozen Faces (A Secret Sense of Rhythm)"
14. "p:Machinery (The Voiceless Beta Wraparound Edit)"
