= Non-Stop (Andy Bell album) =

Studio album by Andy Bell
- Released: June 7, 2010
- Recorded: 2009–2010
- Genre: Synth-pop; electronica
- Label: Mute
- Producer: Andy Bell; Pascal Gabriel

Andy Bell chronology
Electric Blue (2005)	Non-Stop (2010)	Ten Crowns (2025)

Singles from Non-Stop
- 1. "Running Out" Released: November 2, 2009; 2. "Will You Be There?" Released: March 16, 2010; 3. "Call on Me" Released: May 31, 2010; 4. "Non-Stop" Released: October 11, 2010

Professional ratings
Review scores
Source	Rating
AllMusic	3.5/5 stars

Non-Stop is the second solo album by Erasure member Andy Bell, released on 7 June 2010 on Mute Records. The album was co-written and co-produced by Bell and veteran producer Pascal Gabriel (S'Express, Debbie Harry, Kylie Minogue, Dannii Minogue, Ladyhawke, Sophie Ellis-Bextor, Little Boots). Also included is a collaboration with Jane's Addiction vocalist Perry Farrell.

== Writing and production ==
Bell originally went into the studio with Stephen Hague, with whom he had worked with Erasure. The sessions were scrapped however, when Daniel Miller, head of Bell's label Mute, said the songs sounded "too much like Erasure". Recording sessions then started over in France with Belgian producer Pascal Gabriel.

The track "DHDQ" (which stands for "Debbie Harry Drag Queen") is a tribute to Debbie Harry. "I love Madonna and Annie Lennox and Sinéad O'Connor but there's no one like her," Bell has stated. "I was on the True Colors Tour with Debbie and she’s lovely ... She loves the drag queens as well, in New York. To me, nobody's ever copied her because they can't, she’s the queen of all of them."

The album's closing song, "Honey If You Love Him (That's All That Matters)", is a collaboration with Perry Farrell, recorded in Los Angeles. Farrell, a "huge fan of Bell's voice", originally wrote the song for a friend who was a fashion designer. Bell said of the meeting, "He's a really lovely man ... He was telling me how to sing and mean all the words, rather than my histrionic Erasure way."

== Singles ==
Prior to the release of Non-Stop, two songs were released as stand-alone singles under the pseudonym Mimó: "Running Out" (2009) and "Will You Be There?" (2010) The name, used as a "tribute to good friend Tomeau Mimó”, was not used on any subsequent solo releases, as a legal block was issued against Bell by another artist already using the Mimó name. Shortly after release, the two singles were rebranded under "Andy Bell" and both tracks appear on Non-Stop.

The album was preceded by the single "Call on Me" on 31 May 2010. Album track "Say What You Want" was the focus of a remix contest, with the various instrumental parts and a cappella vocal track available to producers to download as a bundle and remix for submission. The winning remix appeared as a track on the maxi-single for "Non-Stop", released as a single on 11 October 2010.

In December 2010, Mute Records released a box set version of the album in limited copies. The box set included the original Non Stop album, the previously released "Call on Me" single, and two more discs including the "Running Out", "Will You Be There?" and "Non Stop" singles. "Running Out" and "Will You Be There?" were housed together on one disc with the same track listing as the single. "Non Stop" contained the same track listing as the single, with three bonus tracks: "Pop Pop Pop Pop", "Keep It to Yourself" and "Cosmic Climb". All four discs fit inside a black cardboard box with a red string inside to lift the CDs out of the box. Consumers had the option to buy the box set with all four discs or with the two new CD pressings only (leaving room for the "Non Stop" album and "Call on Me" single that had been previously released).

== Track listing ==
No.	Title	Writer(s)	Length
1.	"Running Out"	Andy Bell, Pascal Gabriel	3:25
2.	"Call on Me"	Andy Bell, Pascal Gabriel	3:50
3.	"Subject/Object"	Andy Bell, Pascal Gabriel	3:44
4.	"Say What You Want"	Andy Bell, Pascal Gabriel	3:35
5.	"Will You Be There?"	Andy Bell, Pascal Gabriel	3:30
6.	"Slow Release"	Andy Bell, Pascal Gabriel	3:39
7.	"Touch"	Andy Bell, Pascal Gabriel	3:31
8.	"Non-Stop"	Andy Bell, Pascal Gabriel	3:31
9.	"DHDQ"	Andy Bell, Pascal Gabriel	3:17
10.	"Honey If You Love Him (That's All That Matters)" (featuring Perry Farrell)	Perry Farrell	4:56
