= A Secret Wish =

Studio album by Propaganda
- Released: 1 July 1985
- Studio: Sarm West (London)
- Genres: Synth-pop; new wave; avant-pop
- Length: 40:28 (LP); 52:01 (CD)
- Label: ZTT
- Producers: Trevor Horn; Stephen Lipson

Propaganda chronology
A Secret Wish (1985)	Wishful Thinking (1985)

Singles from A Secret Wish
- 1. "The Nine Lives of Dr. Mabuse" Released: 27 February 1984 (UK); 2. "Duel" Released: 22 April 1985; 3. "p:Machinery" Released: 29 July 1985 (UK)

A Secret Wish is the debut album by German synthpop band Propaganda. Released by ZTT Records in 1985, it was produced by Stephen Lipson under the supervision of label boss Trevor Horn.

== Commercial performance and singles ==
The singles "Duel" and "Dr. Mabuse" were both Top 30 UK chart hits. The track "p:Machinery" (a line from which gives the album its title) was also released as a single and was featured in an episode of the '80s TV show Miami Vice and also on the video "Drum" by Duran Duran's Simon Le Bon for his Whitbread Round the World Race in 1985.

Apart from the singles, the album track "The Murder of Love" began receiving airplay in Belgium in July 1985 and Norway in August 1985. The album's opening track "Dream within a Dream" starting getting adds on radio in Portugal in August 1985. "The Chase" also received adds in Italy in September 1985.

In 2021, the digital-only EP "Sorry For Laughing (Reactivated)" was released to streaming services and is available for download.

== Reissues ==
The album was followed up quickly in November 1985 by the Wishful Thinking companion remix album.

A Secret Wish has been reissued a number of times – including as a deluxe 20th anniversary edition and as a multi-channel SACD.

In 2010 a double CD deluxe edition which marked the album's 25th anniversary.

In 2018 it was released as part of the Sony Music BMG 'The Art Of The Album' series on both vinyl & CD with an accompanying 'art print/6 page booklet' on the vinyl issue and 'hard cover/32 page booklet' with the CD. Both were advertised as 'Remastered from the original tapes ‘for the first time’, the vinyl and CD reissues will replicate the original ZTT vinyl LP / CD track listings'. However both contain the longer version of 'Dream Within A Dream' which omits the original guitar solo.

In October 2025, an exclusive blu-ray audio was released featuring brand new Dolby Atmos, 5.1 and stereo mixes of the original vinyl tracklist by David Kosten (the CD version is included in its original stereo form). At the same time, a six CD set called A Secret Sense of Rhythm, A Secret Sense of Sin was also released.

== Reception ==
Professional ratings
Review scores
Source	Rating
AllMusic	4/5 stars
Record Collector	5/5 stars
Record Mirror	5/5 stars
Smash Hits	8/10

European magazine Eurotipsheet named the album one of its "albums of the week" in its issue dated July 8, 1985.

== Track listing ==
=== Original 1985 vinyl album release ===
A – WITHIN

1. "Dream Within a Dream" – 8:04
2. "The Murder of Love" – 5:12
3. "Jewel" – 3:10
4. "Duel" – 4:43

B – WITHOUT

1. "p:Machinery" – 3:50
2. "Sorry for Laughing" – 3:25
3. "Dr. Mabuse (First Life)" – 5:00
4. "The Chase" – 4:03
5. "The Last Word/Strength to Dream" – 3:01

"Dream Within a Dream" has the lyrics of the poem "A Dream Within a Dream" by Edgar Allan Poe. The original 8.04-minute version features a guitar solo, the longer version has the solo omitted. "Sorry for Laughing" is a cover of the 1981 single by Josef K. "The Last Word" is an instrumental based on "Dr. Mabuse". "Strength to Dream" is the opening line from "Dream Within a Dream". On the sleeve and label, "Jewel" and "Duel" were listed as a single track, whereas "The Last Word" and "Strength to Dream" were separate.

=== Original 1985 CD release ===
1. "Dream Within a Dream" [extended] – 9:09
2. "The Murder of Love" – 5:12
3. "Jewel" – 6:22
4. "Duel" [CD remix] – 4:42
5. "Frozen Faces" – 4:25
6. "p:Machinery" [single mix] – 3:51
7. "Sorry for Laughing" – 3:27
8. "The Chase" – 4:04
9. "Dr Mabuse" [CD remix] – 10:41

"Jewel" is the 'cut rough' 12-inch (vocal) mix, with the opening seconds replaced by the album intro. "Duel" has minor changes within the mix, as does "p:Machinery", appearing here as the single mix. The version of "Dr Mabuse" here is the first 12-inch mix ('Das Testaments des Mabuse'), with the final minute replaced by the end of "The Last Word/Strength to Dream" from the original LP.

The three-month delay between the vinyl and CD releases gave producer Steve Lipson the opportunity to remix the album to his satisfaction, and he said that he considered the CD to be the definitive version.

The original US release contained the UK CD in a longbox. Several years later, a US printing was done that had the vinyl tracks but mislabeled with the original UK CD artwork. Most subsequent reissues featured a hybrid track listing, following the vinyl for the most part, but with the addition of the longer vocal "Jewel" and "Frozen Faces".

=== Japanese CD reissue ===
1. "Dream Within a Dream" – 8:04
2. "The Murder of Love" – 5:18
3. "Jewel" – 3:11
4. "Duel" – 4:48
5. "Frozen Faces" – 4:25
6. "p:Machinery" – 3:50
7. "Sorry for Laughing" – 3:27
8. "Dr. Mabuse (first life)" – 5:04
9. "The Chase" – 4:05
10. "The Last Word/Strength to Dream" – 3:02
11. "Femme Fatale (The Woman with the Orchid)" – 3:21
12. "Dr. Mabuse (13th Life)" – 6:36
13. "Duel (bitter-sweet)" – 7:36
14. "(the beta wraparound of) p:Machinery" – 10:47

=== 20th Anniversary reissue ===
CD

1. "Dream Within a Dream" – 9:08
2. "The Murder of Love" – 5:12
3. "Jewel" – 6:22
4. "Duel" – 4:42
5. "Frozen Faces" – 4:25
6. "p:Machinery" – 3:51
7. "Sorry for Laughing" – 3:27
8. "The Chase" – 4:04
9. "Dr. Mabuse" – 10:41

DVD

1. "Duel (Version 1)" – 4:52
2. "p:Machinery" – 3:48
3. "Dr. Mabuse (Version 1)" – 4:50
4. "Dr. Mabuse (Version 2)" – 4:30

=== SACD release ===
1. "Dream Within a Dream" – 8:06
2. "The Murder of Love" – 5:17
3. "Jewel" – 6:23
4. "Duel" – 4:48
5. "Frozen Faces" – 4:22
6. "p:Machinery" – 3:50
7. "Sorry for Laughing" – 3:27
8. "Dr. Mabuse" – 5:04
9. "The Chase" – 4:05
10. "Strength to Dream" – 3:00

=== 2010 2CD Deluxe "Element Series" Edition ===
CD 1: "The Dark Religions Depart..."
No.	Title	Lyrics	Music	Length
1.	"Dream Within a Dream"	Edgar Allan Poe	Mertens	9:09
2.	"The Murder of Love"	Brücken, Dörper	Brücken, Mertens	5:14
3.	"Jewel"	Dörper	Brücken, Dörper, Mertens	6:21
4.	"Duel"	Dörper	Brücken, Dörper, Mertens	4:42
5.	"Frozen Faces"	Brücken, Freytag, Mertens	Brücken, Freytag, Mertens	4:24
6.	"p:Machinery"	Dörper	Mertens	3:49
7.	"Sorry for Laughing"	Haig	Haig, Ross	3:28
8.	"The Chase"	Dörper	Mertens	3:55
9.	"Dr. Mabuse"	Dörper	Dörper, Mertens, Thein	10:42
10.	"Dream Within a Dream" (Analogue Variation)	Edgar Allan Poe	Mertens	8:04
11.	"Jewel" (Analogue Variation)	Dörper	Brücken, Dörper, Mertens	3:10
12.	"Duel" (Analogue Variation)	Dörper	Brücken, Dörper, Mertens	4:42
13.	"p:Machinery" (Analogue Variation)	Dörper	Mertens	3:49
14.	"Dr. Mabuse (First Life)" (Analogue Variation)	Dörper	Dörper, Mertens, Thein	5:03
15.	"The Last Word (Strength to Dream)" (Analogue Variation)	Dörper, Mertens	Dörper, Mertens	3:03
Total length:				79:38

CD 2: "...And Sweet Science Reigns"
No.	Title	Lyrics	Music	Length
1.	"Do Well" (The First Cut/Duel/Jewel (Cut Rough)/Wonder/Bejewelled)	Dörper	Brücken, Dörper, Mertens	20:06
2.	"Testament One"	(instrumental)	Brücken, Dörper, Mertens	1:20
3.	"Die tausend Augen des Mabuse"	Dörper	Dörper, Mertens, Thein	9:47
4.	"Sorry for Laughing" (Unapologetic 12" Version)	Haig	Haig, Ross	10:12
5.	"Thought (Part I)"	(instrumental)	Dörper, Thein	2:08
6.	"Thought (Part II)"	(instrumental)	Dörper, Thein	0:29
7.	"p:Machinery" (Goodnight 32 Mix)	Dörper	Mertens	4:12
8.	"The Chase" (The Goodnight Mix)	Dörper	Mertens	3:55
9.	"(Echo Of) Frozen Faces"	Brücken, Freytag, Mertens	Brücken, Freytag, Mertens	10:20
10.	"p:Machinery (p:Polish)"	Dörper	Mertens	9:24
11.	"Testament Three"	(instrumental)	Brücken, Dörper, Mertens	0:26
Total length:				72:28

"Do Well" is the cassette single version of "Duel". "Die tausend Augen des Mabuse" is an extended version of the 6'31" twelve-inch mix (aka "13th Life"), without the early fade out. "Thought" (parts one and two) appeared together on Wishful Thinking (part two is the "p:Machinery" reprise). The Goodnight 32 mix of "p:Machinery" was released in 1985 on a 7-inch single as "p:Machinery (reactivated)".

== Personnel ==
Propaganda

- Ralf Dörper - keyboards, programming
- Michael Mertens - percussion, keyboards, programming
- Susanne Freytag - vocals, occasional percussion and keyboards
- Claudia Brücken - vocals
- Andreas Thein - keyboards, programming

Guest musicians

- Andrew Richards - keyboards
- Stewart Copeland - drums and percussion on "Duel"
- John McGeoch
- Steve Howe (guitar solo on "The Murder of Love")
- David Sylvian
- Glenn Gregory
- Trevor Horn
- Johnathan Sorrell
- Ian Mosley

== Charts ==
Chart (1985)	Position
Dutch Albums (Album Top 100)	5
European Top 100 Albums (Eurotipsheet)	20
German Albums (Offizielle Top 100)	24
New Zealand Albums (RMNZ)	21
Swedish Albums (Sverigetopplistan)	25
Swiss Albums (Schweizer Hitparade)	14
UK Albums Chart	16

Chart (2010)	Position
UK Albums Chart	92
