= Propaganda (band) =

German synthpop group

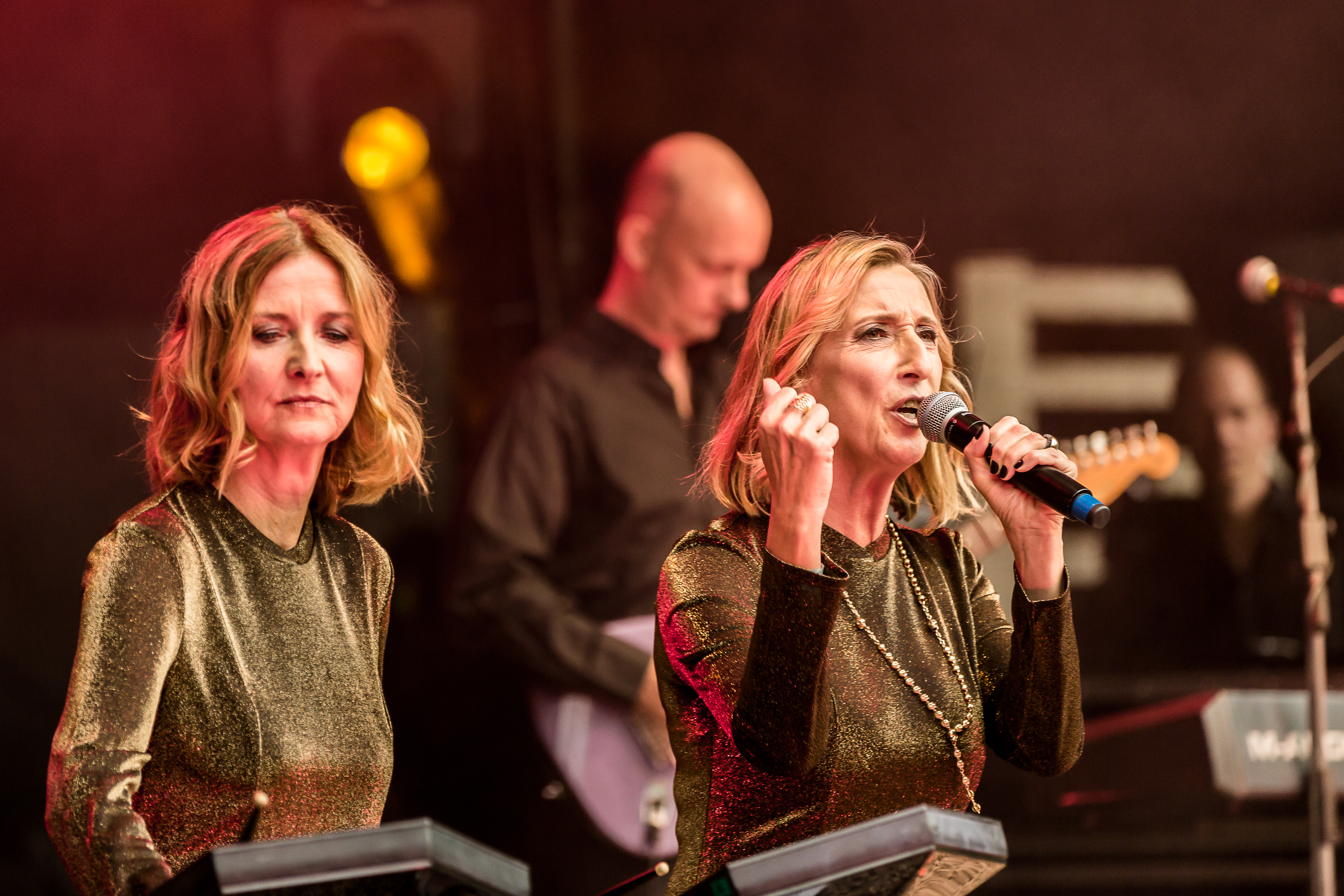
- xPropaganda performing in September 2018, from left to right: Susanne Freytag and Claudia Brücken

Background information
- Origin: Düsseldorf, West Germany
- Genres: Synth-pop; new wave; electronic
- Years active: 1982–1990; 2005–present
- Labels: ZTT; Virgin; Columbia
- Spinoffs: Act; Onetwo; xPropaganda
- Members: Ralf Dörper; Michael Mertens
- Past members: Andreas Thein; Claudia Brücken; Derek Forbes; Brian McGee; Betsi Miller; Susanne Freytag

Propaganda is a German synth-pop band formed in Düsseldorf in 1982. They signed a recording contract with the UK label ZTT Records in 1983 and released their first single "Dr. Mabuse" in 1984. Their debut studio album, the critically acclaimed A Secret Wish, was released in mid-1985, and contained both "Dr. Mabuse" and the hit single "Duel" (both singles were UK Top 30 hits). A second studio album, 1234, was recorded with a markedly different line-up and released in 1990 by Virgin Records to less success. There have been several partial reformations of the group in the 21st century, with the original vocalists Claudia Brücken and Susanne Freytag currently active as xPropaganda who released a new album in 2022, and the remaining original members Ralf Dörper and Michael Mertens continuing as Propaganda and releasing an album in 2024 with a guest vocalist Thunder Bae.

== History ==
=== 1982–1984: Early history ===
Propaganda was formed in Düsseldorf, West Germany, in 1982, by Ralf Dörper (a member of the pioneering German industrial band Die Krupps). As a trio, with artist Andreas Thein and vocalist Susanne Freytag, the group made initial recordings in Germany which were destined for future release in the UK, where Ralf Dörper's early experimental recordings had received critical acclaim by radio DJ John Peel and journalist Chris Bohn (aka Biba Kopf). With the inclusion of classically trained musician and composer, Michael Mertens and singer Claudia Brücken (who had been in an all female band, The Topolinos, with Freytag), music journalist Paul Morley signed the band to Trevor Horn's newly formed ZTT label in 1983.

The group relocated to the United Kingdom and released the single "Dr. Mabuse", named after the fictional character made famous by filmmaker Fritz Lang. The single reached the Top 30 in the UK Singles Chart, and the Top 10 in Germany. The group appeared on various TV shows in the UK, including Channel 4's The Tube. Here, as well as performing "Dr. Mabuse", the group also gave one of its few performances of a cover version of Throbbing Gristle's song "Discipline".

Before the year was out, Thein was asked to leave the band due to musical differences. With Mertens now filling the gap left by his departure, the band forged ahead with recording its follow-up single and debut album. However both of these were to be delayed as a result of the unexpectedly huge success of ZTT's most famous signing, Frankie Goes to Hollywood. As the label was still in its infancy, ZTT was forced to spend all its limited resources on promoting and marketing Frankie Goes to Hollywood, and this also meant that Trevor Horn was not available to produce Propaganda's album. Stephen Lipson, one of Horn's established studio engineers, took his place along with Andy Richards playing keyboards, but the delay meant that Propaganda's second single, the more pop-oriented "Duel", did not surface until April 1985. Perhaps the band's most recognisable release, it was also their highest-charting single in the UK, reaching number 21. The band made its single appearance on the flagship BBC music programme Top of the Pops in June of that year.

In May 1985, with Frankie Goes to Hollywood becoming tax exiles in Ireland, the band effectively headlined "The Value of Entertainment", a series of showcase gigs of ZTT signings, held at the Ambassadors Theatre in London. The shows also featured Art of Noise, Anne Pigalle, Andrew Poppy and Instinct. Propaganda were joined on stage by former Simple Minds bassist Derek Forbes and ex-Japan drummer Steve Jansen.

=== 1985: A Secret Wish ===
The first week of July 1985 finally saw the release of the band's debut album, A Secret Wish. After receiving considerable critical acclaim and some commercial success, it reached number 16 on the UK Albums Chart. The album was followed by another single, "p:Machinery", in August 1985, which only reached number 50 in the UK, but becoming a bigger hit in U.S.A., Italy, France, the Netherlands, Germany and Switzerland. It was even being used in the hit US TV Show Miami Vice (1986 episode: The Fix). The 12-inch version of this release caused controversy (even within the group) as Paul Morley thought it was a good idea to have the sleeve feature a quote by writer J. G. Ballard, praising the activities of the German extremist group Red Army Faction. Ariola, who distributed ZTT's releases in Germany, refused to carry the 12" as a result, so the quote was changed on the German release to another by Ballard, on the aesthetic perfection of German suburbs.

The group spent the rest of the year on their "Outside World" tour, taking in Europe and America. They were joined once again by Derek Forbes on bass, with his fellow ex-Simple Minds colleagues Brian McGee on drums, and Kevin Armstrong on guitar, with backing tapes used for most of the keyboard parts. In the meantime a remix album, Wishful Thinking, was released in November 1985. Originally intended for the American club market, the album was also released in Europe, but against the wishes of the group themselves. The album peaked at number 82 in the UK. A remixed version of "p:Machinery" was also re-released as a single, only four months after its original release. In the UK, it too failed to make an impact and peaked at number 83, but was, again, more successful in France and Germany.

=== 1986–1987: Split ===
1986 started positively with the single "p:Machinery" gaining the number 1 chart position in Spain (for one week) and entering the Top 10 in France, but disaster was looming. In late 1985, the band's management had introduced them to the London-based music lawyer Brian Carr (of Compton Carr), who had helped to win the legal case between John Lydon (Sex Pistols/Public Image Ltd) and his management. Carr explained to the group members that under their current contracts with ZTT, they could go on making records for the rest of their lives and never make any money from them. Based on this information the band asked ZTT to renegotiate their contracts, which the company declined. Soon afterwards Claudia Brücken (who was married to ZTT's Paul Morley) left Propaganda to pursue a solo career, and remained signed to ZTT. After a protracted legal battle, which saw the remaining members of Propaganda under an injunction by ZTT for fourteen months, they were finally released from their contract to ZTT in a hurried out-of-court settlement in the summer of 1987. ZTT signed the duo Act of Brücken and Thomas Leer in 1988, but they did not match the commercial success of Propaganda despite the production of Stephen Lipson.

=== 1988–1992: New record deal and line-up ===
In 1988, the band (initially still comprising Mertens, Dörper and Freytag) signed to Virgin Records, and began recording new material. As Dörper and Freytag decided to step away from the band on a full time basis, only Mertens remained along with a new line-up of American vocalist Betsi Miller, and bassist Derek Forbes and drummer Brian McGee (both ex-Simple Minds) who had both worked with the band for live appearances in 1985 but now joined them formally. The result was a new album, released in 1990 called 1234, produced by former Tears for Fears' associates Ian Stanley and Chris Hughes, who would become Miller's future husband. Though he did not play on the album, Dörper's lyrics were used on the songs "Only One Word", "Wound in My Heart", and "Vicious Circle". Freytag performed guest vocals on two tracks ("Vicious Circle" and Ministry of Fear"), and David Gilmour of Pink Floyd played guitar on the songs, "Your Wildlife" and "Only One Word".

The first single from the album, "Heaven Give Me Words", was co-written with 1980s synth-pop star Howard Jones and reached the UK Top 40. The album was not as successful as A Secret Wish, only peaking at number 46 in the UK. "Only One Word" was released as the second single but stalled at number 71 in the UK.

=== 1998–2004: Part-reunion and second split ===
In 1998, Mertens, Brücken, and Freytag reunited, signed an options deal with East West, and began working on new material. Several tracks were completed, including one produced by Tim Simenon and featuring Depeche Mode's Martin Gore on guitar. A video for one song, "No Return", was produced in Morocco and directed by 'Keyser Soze' in December 1998. Two minute clips of it, along with photos of the shoot, were released via the band's official website in early 2000. However, no album materialized and, in January 2002, Brücken announced, "The reunion was worth a try, but did not work out." Tracks of these recording sessions were leaked to the internet in 2002.

However a real reunion of the four original band members took place in November 2004, when Brücken, Dörper, Freytag and Mertens—but without Thein—performed "Dr. Mabuse" at a concert for the Prince's Trust which took place at Wembley Arena, celebrating 25 years of Trevor Horn's career as a successful producer.

A few years later the band also appeared exclusively on a German TV show celebrating the best songs of the 1980s.

=== 2005–2015: Further activities ===
In early 2005, Propaganda, now comprising Susanne Freytag and Michael Mertens, started to release new material on the German independent label Amontillado Music. The limited edition 12" vinyl release "Valley of the Machine Gods" was sold out within two weeks.

In July 2010, a two-disc Deluxe Edition of A Secret Wish, containing the varying tracks released on both the original vinyl album, cassette and CD versions, was released to mark the album's 25th anniversary. This edition also included unreleased 12-inch remixes and previously unheard demos. The booklet accompanying the release noted that "at the time of writing, spring 2010, Mertens, Brücken, Freytag and Dörper are back on terms and for the second time since 2000 they are considering working together".

On 2 March 2011, Claudia Brücken performed at Scala in London and was joined by Ralf Dörper and Susanne Freytag for some of the tracks. Thomas Leer was also expected to perform but was unable to do so because of a throat operation. The gig was recorded for later DVD release and also featured Glenn Gregory and Martyn Ware of Heaven 17 and Andy Bell of Erasure. However, in an interview around the same time, Brücken said that Mertens was unwilling to work with her any longer.

Andreas Thein died on 31 May 2013 from cancer.

Propaganda is credited for remixing Holly Johnson's single "Dancing with No Fear" (released 2015), on which Michael Mertens and Ralf Dörper also played a synthesizer.

=== 2018: xPropaganda ===
The duo of Brücken and Freytag appeared on some retro festivals across Europe and did some shows performing "A Secret Wish" in Germany using the name 'Duel', whereas in the UK the name 'xPropaganda' was used. Here they supported Heaven 17 in late November and early December 2018 to mark the 35th anniversary of the Luxury Gap album. The duo of Brücken and Freytag were backed by the former Onetwo band. A live recording of one of xPropaganda's London shows was released as the album A Secret Place in 2018.

On 20 May 2022, the xPropaganda album titled The Heart Is Strange by Brücken, Freytag and Lipson was released in various formats by Universal Music on the ZTT imprint. The album peaked at no. 11 in the UK, higher than any of Propaganda's previous releases. Music journalist Daryl Easlea of Louder praised the album as "a compelling listen", remarking as well that its style sounded "exactly like it could have followed their old group's debut". The album was a result of Brücken and Freytag approaching Stephen Lipson to ask him to write new songs with them that they could include in their live show. These were written and recorded during the COVID-19 lockdown and resulted in enough tracks to make an album. Their manager approached Universal with the album and gained a two-album deal. Michael Mertens had been approached to be involved in the songwriting but declined.

=== 2024–present: new, self-titled album ===
On 17 May 2024, Propaganda now comprising only members Mertens and Dörper, released a new track, "Purveyor of Pleasure", featuring Thunder Bae on vocals. A new eight-track self-titled album was released on 11 October 2024 on the record label Bureau B. The album features vocalist Thunder Bae, and composer, pianist, and former rapper Hauschka. Mertens and Dörper recorded the album in Düsseldorf.

== Discography ==
=== Studio albums ===
List of studio albums, with selected chart positions
Title	Details	Peak chart positions					
Title	Details	GER	NL	NZ	SWE	SWI	UK
A Secret Wish	Released: 1 July 1985; Label: ZTT; Formats: CD, LP, cassette, digital download, streaming	24	5	21	25	14	16
1234	Released: May 1990; Label: Virgin; Formats: CD, LP, cassette, digital download, streaming	—	45	—	21	—	46
Propaganda	Released: 11 October 2024; Label: Bureau B; Formats: CD, LP, digital download, streaming	12	—	—	—	—	—
"—" denotes a recording that did not chart or was not released in that territory.

=== xPropaganda albums ===
List of xPropaganda albums, with selected chart positions
Title	Details	Peak chart positions			
Title	Details	GER	BEL (FL)	SWI	UK
The Heart Is Strange	Released: 20 May 2022; Label: ZTT; Formats: 2CD, LP, Blu-ray audio, digital download, streaming	21	132	62	11

=== Remix albums ===
List of remix albums, with selected chart positions
Title	Details	Peak chart positions	
Title	Details	NL	UK
Wishful Thinking	Released: November 1985; Label: ZTT; Formats: CD, LP, cassette, digital download, streaming	64	82
Remix Encounters	Released: 19 September 2025; Label: Bureau B; Formats: CD, 2xLP, digital download	–	–

=== Compilation albums ===
List of compilation albums
Title	Details
Outside World	Released: July 2002; Label: ZTT; Formats: CD, digital download, streaming
Noise and Girls Come Out to Play	Released: September 2012; Label: Salvo, ZTT; Format: CD
The Best of Propaganda	Released: September 2013; Label: Metro Select, ZTT; Format: CD
The Eight Testaments of Propaganda	Released: 13 April 2019; Label: ZTT, BMG; Format: 4xLP
A Secret Sense of Rhythm : A Secret Sense of Sin	Released: 14 November 2025; Label: ZTT, Universal Music Recordings; Format: 6xCD

=== Singles ===
List of singles, with selected chart positions, showing year released and album name
Title	Year	Chart positions								Album
Title	Year	GER	BEL (FL)	FRA	NL	NZ	SWE	SWI	UK	Album
"The Nine Lives of Dr. Mabuse"	1984	7	—	—	—	—	—	14	27	A Secret Wish
"Duel"	1985	30	15	—	9	17	—	—	21	A Secret Wish
"p:Machinery"	1985	26	9	10	9	—	—	29	50	A Secret Wish
"Heaven Give Me Words"	1990	40	—	—	43	—	13	—	36	1234
"Only One Word"	1990	—	—	—	—	—	—	—	71	1234
"How Much Love"	1990	—	—	—	—	—	—	—	—	1234
"Wound in My Heart"	1991	—	—	—	—	—	—	—	—	1234
"p:Machinery" (T-Empo remix)	1995	—	—	—	—	—	—	—	79	Non-album singles
"Valley of the Machine Gods"	2006	—	—	—	—	—	—	—	—	Non-album singles
"Purveyor of Pleasure"	2024	—	—	—	—	—	—	—	—	Propaganda
"They Call Me Nocebo"	2024	—	—	—	—	—	—	—	—	Propaganda
"Tipping Point"	2024	—	—	—	—	—	—	—	—	Propaganda
"—" denotes a recording that did not chart or was not released in that territory.
