= Thomas Leer =

Scottish musician

- Birth name: Thomas Wishart
- Born: 1953 (age 71–72); Port Glasgow, Scotland
- Genres: Minimal wave; synth-pop; new wave
- Instruments: Vocals; keyboards
- Years active: 1978–present
- Website: thomasleer.co.uk

Thomas Leer (born Thomas Wishart, 1953) is a Scottish musician. He has released a number of albums and singles as a solo artist, and was also one half (the other being Claudia Brücken) of the 1980s electropop band Act.

== Biography ==
Born in Port Glasgow, Scotland, Leer played in several local experimental pop groups in the early to mid-1970s, moving to London when the punk rock scene was at its height. He formed the punk band Pressure, but by 1978 had moved on to music influenced by synthpop and Krautrock bands such as Can. That year, he self-financed his debut single, "Private Plane". Although it was recorded in his own flat and was only issued in 650 copies on his own label, it gained significant attention, with NME naming it "Single of the Week". In 1979, he released the album The Bridge in collaboration with Robert Rental. In 1981, he signed to Cherry Red, his first release for the label being the 4 Movements EP. After two further releases on the label, he was signed by Arista Records, releasing three further singles and his debut full-length solo album, The Scale of Ten in late 1985.

Two years later, he formed the duo Act along with ex-Propaganda singer Claudia Brücken, signing to ZTT Records. The duo released four singles (including the minor UK hit "Snobbery and Decay") and an album, Laughter, Tears and Rage, before splitting up, with Brücken pursuing a solo career. Leer retired at this point, but returned in 2003 with a new album and in 2009 on the track "Tonight", from the Stefano Panunzi album A Rose and continues to be musically active.

An exhibition named From The Port To The Bridge, curated by music archivist Simon Dell, has documented the work of Thomas Leer and Robert Rental. It has been staged at Greenock’s Beacon Arts Centre in 2018, and in London at Horse Hospital in January 2022. The pivotal part of this exhibition is the recording and release of their 1979 album The Bridge, which was reissued by Mute in 2022.

== Discography ==
=== Albums ===
- The Bridge (1979), Industrial (with Robert Rental) – UK Indie No. 9, reissued (1992), Mute/Grey Area
- Contradictions (1982), Cherry Red – UK Indie No. 8, double 12-inch mini-LP
- Letter from America (1982), Cherry Red/Cachalot – double 12-inch LP
- The Scale of Ten (1985), Arista – reissued on CD in expanded form (2004), BMG
- Conversation Peace (2003), Avatar
- Parts of a Greater Hole (2004), Karvavena
- From Sci-Fi to Barfly (2007), Future Historic – digital only release, CD release on Klanggalerie, 2015
- 1982 (2015), Future Historic – digital only release, previously unreleased material except for one track, CD release on Klanggalerie, 2018
- 1991 (2015), Future Historic – digital only release, previously unreleased material
- 1979 (2016), Future Historic – digital only release, previously unreleased material, CD release on Klanggalerie/LP release on Dark Entries, both 2017
- Reaching Never Quite (2018), Future Historic - digital only release of new material
- Emotional Hardware (2020), Smitten Kitten CD Release

Compilations

- Contradictions - The Cherry Red Collection (1994), Cherry Red

=== Singles ===
- "Private Plane/International" (1978), Oblique
- 4 Movements EP (1981), Cherry Red – UK Indie No. 39
- "All About You" (1982), Cherry Red – UK Indie No. 11
- "International" (1984), Arista
- "Heartbeat" (1985), Arista
- "No 1" (1985), Arista

== See also ==
- List of ambient music artists
