= Claudia Brücken =

German singer and songwriter (born 1963)

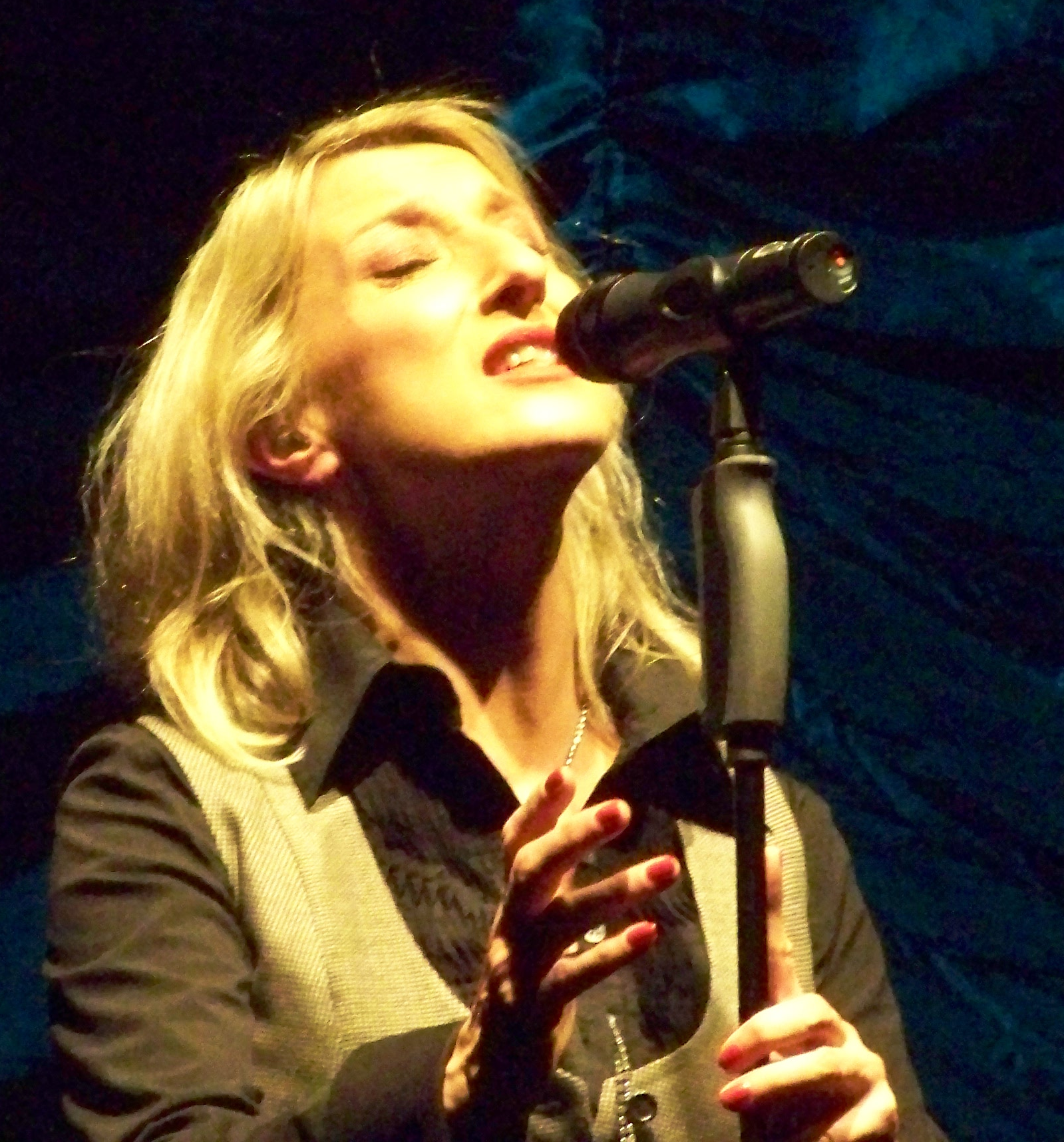
- Brücken performing in December 2007

Background information
- Born: 7 December 1963 (age 62); Berching, Bavaria, West Germany
- Occupations: Singer; songwriter
- Years active: 1978–present
- Website: claudiabrucken.co.uk
- Musical career
- Genres: Synth-pop; new wave
- Instrument: Vocals
- Labels: Island; ZTT

Claudia Brücken (born 7 December 1963) is a German singer and songwriter. She was the lead vocalist of the synth-pop band Propaganda for many years.

In 1996, Brücken started working with Orchestral Manoeuvres in the Dark co-founder Paul Humphreys, first without a name, and from 2004 as Onetwo. In March 2013, Brücken and Humphreys ceased working and living together, and she has subsequently returned to pursuing her solo career.

== Early career ==
At age 14, Brücken joined her first band, Haarsträubend. Her second band was the all-female The Tripolinas together with Susanne Freytag, who also became a member of the band Propaganda.

== Propaganda ==
In 1983, Brücken joined the German band Propaganda and relocated to London when they signed with ZTT Records. Propaganda had two UK top 30 hit singles with "Dr Mabuse" (1984) and "Duel" (1985). On 14 February 1985, Brücken married British music journalist Paul Morley, who was one of the founders of the ZTT label. In July 1985, the first Propaganda album A Secret Wish was released. While promoting their first album and writing songs for a new album, internal tensions rose within the group. This was mainly attributed to the relationship between Brücken and Morley, and the profitless contract the band had signed with ZTT. In 1986, Propaganda left ZTT, and Brücken left Propaganda to stay with ZTT.

I wasn't this kind of control freak which I sometimes was portrayed as. It was because we didn't have a very good deal at the time with ZTT, and everybody got very defensive about his or her bit, which was what drove us apart, really. It seemed for the band there were Paul and I and then the rest of them. They accused me of things; I'm really not one for making strategies and plotting behind people's back.

== Act and solo career ==
She joined Thomas Leer to form Act, who in 1988 released their only album Laughter, Tears and Rage. In 1991 she released a solo album Love: And a Million Other Things for Island Records. In the United Kingdom two singles were released from this album "Absolut(e)" in 1990, and "Kiss Like Ether" in 1991. Throughout the rest of the 1990s, Brücken concentrated mainly on motherhood (she has a daughter, Maddy, and a son, Daniel, with Paul Morley) and made some guest performances on albums of other artists. She had met Paul Humphreys (of OMD) in the early 1980s but it was in 1996 when the pair became close, as she was working on songs for a possible second solo album.

== Propaganda reunion ==
In 1998, Brücken joined the part-reunion of Propaganda (in which founder Ralf Dörper, see also Die Krupps, did not take part) and they began working on new material. Several tracks were completed as demos, including a snippet of a video. A preview of this video was released via the band's official website in early 2000, however, the reunion fell apart and no album materialized, although nine songs were leaked to the internet. Two of these were later released as Onetwo songs: "Cloud Nine", co-written by Martin Gore of Depeche Mode, and "Anonymous".

The original four-piece including founder Ralf Dörper performed together at the Trevor Horn Prince's Trust extravaganza which took place at the Wembley Arena in 2004. Another attempt at a band reunion failed in 2010.

== 2000–2018 ==
At the end of 2000, Brücken and Humphreys undertook a short tour of the United States as "Paul Humphreys of OMD: OMD Revisited". The tour started in Salt Lake City, and they performed songs from OMD and Propaganda, but also some new songs they had written. As Onetwo, in June 2004 the pair became the first established artists to release new material exclusively on eBay with a 5-track EP format called Item. Onetwo made their live debut in September 2004 at the Carling Academy at Islington.

A collaboration between Brücken and pianist Andrew Poppy resulted in the album Another Language in 2005. On this album, they performed songs of other artists with just vocals and piano/guitar.

Onetwo finally released their debut album Instead on 26 February 2007, and performed some gigs in April 2007. They also supported Erasure and The Human League in the second half of 2007.

Her vocals can be heard in the hit 2011 video game L.A. Noire, as the singing voice of lounge singer, German immigrant and the main character's love interest Elsa Lichtmann.

In 2011, Brücken released Combined, which contained eight previously released tracks and four new ones, including her duet with Andy Bell of Erasure and two tracks from Onetwo. She also did a duet with Paul Rutherford of Frankie Goes To Hollywood singing "This Is Not America", a song written by David Bowie and Pat Metheny for the soundtrack of the movie The Falcon and the Snowman.

In March 2011, Brücken performed at the Scala, Kings Cross, London. She performed a selection of songs from her work with Propaganda, Act, Andrew Poppy, OneTwo and several numbers from her solo career. She was joined onstage by a variety of guests including Paul Humphreys, Glenn Gregory, Martyn Ware, Andrew Poppy, Susanne Freytag, Ralf Dörper and Andy Bell. The concert was called 'This Time: It's Claudia Brücken'. The concert was recorded and released on 23 July 2012 as a CD/DVD entitled This Happened: Live at the Scala. The concert film was directed by Martin Gooch and the recordings were produced by Paul Humphreys and David Watson.

On 6 November 2012, Brücken released a new album titled The Lost Are Found, a collection of "lost" songs from artists such as the Pet Shop Boys, Julee Cruise and the Band, whose second album The Band contains "Whispering Pines" which lends the album its title. A video for "Whispering Pines" was released as the album's first single in December. The album was produced by Stephen Hague. The second single, a cover of David Bowie's "Everyone Says 'Hi'", was released as a single in the UK and Germany on 18 March 2013, alongside an accompanying video. The track was used in the 2014 film A Most Wanted Man.

Brücken played live in the UK in March 2013. Germany tour dates were postponed after an announcement on 7 March reporting that Paul Humphreys would have to withdraw from the original dates.

In October 2014, Brücken released a new solo album, entitled Where Else... (via Cherry Red Records), a collaboration with co-writer and producer John Williams.

== 2018–present: xPropaganda ==
For two nights in March 2018, Brücken, along with former Propaganda bandmate Susanne Freytag, performed the Propaganda album A Secret Wish in its entirety at The Garage in London under the name xPropaganda. By 2021 the duo of Brücken and Freytag decided that their band's name would be now styled as xPropaganda, with the duo recording a new album with producer Stephen Lipson titled The Heart Is Strange. In February 2022, Universal Music announced that it would release The Heart Is Strange on the ZTT label in May, a label the original line-up of Propaganda had signed to in the 1980s. The duo, along with Lipson, made a video for the single "Don't (You Mess With Me)". xPropaganda (including Lipson) toured during 2022 showcasing tracks from the new album, as well as playing tracks from A Secret Wish. The album reached No. 11 on the UK Albums Chart, a higher position than the original Propaganda achieved 40 years earlier.

In July 2025, Brücken released a new solo album entitled Night Mirror via the Demon Music Group. Recorded in London between 2023-25 and produced by the British A&R executive/producer John Williams, the album peaked at No. 78 on the UK Albums Chart.

== Select discography ==
Release date	Label	Artist	Title	Notes
1985	ZTT	Propaganda	A Secret Wish	album
1985	ZTT	Propaganda	Wishful Thinking	remix album
27 August 1985	ZTT	Glenn Gregory and Claudia Brücken	"When Your Heart Runs Out of Time"	single
27 June 1988	ZTT	Act	Laughter, Tears and Rage	album
February 1991	Island	Claudia Brücken	Love: And a Million Other Things	album
1991	London	Jimmy Somerville	The Singles Collection 1984/1990	vocals on the track "Run from Love"
1994	One Little Indian	Spirit Feel	Spirit Feel	vocals on the track "Halleluhwah"
1996	Interpol	The Brain featuring Claudia Brücken	"I'll Find a Way"	single
1997	Landspeed	Oceanhead featuring Claudia Brücken	"Eyemotion"	single
19 February 2002	Hard:Drive	Apoptygma Berzerk	Harmonizer	vocals on the track "Unicorn"
7 April 2003	Gang Go Music	Blank & Jones	Relax	vocals on the track "Unknown Treasure"
28 June 2004	There(There)	Onetwo	Item	five-track EP
28 March 2005	There(There)	Andrew Poppy and Claudia Brücken	Another Language	album
3 October 2005	Sanctuary	Andy Bell	Electric Blue	vocals on the tracks "Love Oneself" and "Delicious"
26 February 2007	There(There)	Onetwo	Instead	album
17 November 2008	Soundcolours	Blank & Jones	Chilltronica – A Definition, No. 1	vocals on the track "Don't Stop"
7 February 2011	Salvo/Soulfood Music	Claudia Brücken	Combined	compilation album
23 July 2012	There (There) Music	Claudia Brücken	This Happened: Live at the Scala	live performance CD/DVD
6 November 2012	There (There) Music	Claudia Brücken	The Lost Are Found	album
6 October 2014	Cherry Red	Claudia Brücken	Where Else...	album
15 June 2018	Cherry Red	Claudia Brücken and Jerome Froese	Beginn	album
4 March 2022	Cherry Red	Wolfgang Flür featuring Claudia Brücken & Peter Hook	Magazine 1	vocals on the track "Birmingham"
20 May 2022	ZTT/Universal	xPropaganda	The Heart Is Strange	album
4 July 2025	Edsel Records	Claudia Brücken	Night Mirror	album
