= Cabaret Voltaire discography =

- Studio albums: 17
- EPs: 8
- Soundtrack albums: 2
- Live albums: 8
- Compilation albums: 8
- Singles: 24
- Video albums: 5
- Remix albums: 4
- Box sets: 6

This is the discography of the English music group Cabaret Voltaire.

== Albums ==
=== Studio albums ===
Title	Album details	Peak chart positions	
Title	Album details	UK	UK Indie
Mix-Up	Released: 23 October 1979; Label: Rough Trade; Formats: LP	—	12
Three Mantras	Released: 1 April 1980; Label: Rough Trade; Formats: 12"	—	10
The Voice of America	Released: July 1980; Label: Rough Trade; Formats: LP	—	3
Red Mecca	Released: August 1981; Label: Rough Trade; Formats: LP	—	1
2x45	Released: April 1982; Label: Rough Trade; Formats: 2x12"	98	1
The Crackdown	Released: 18 August 1983; Label: Some Bizzare/Virgin; Formats: LP, MC	31	—
Micro-Phonies	Released: 29 October 1984; Label: Some Bizzare/Virgin; Formats: LP, MC	69	—
The Covenant, the Sword, and the Arm of the Lord	Released: 14 October 1985; Label: Some Bizzare/Virgin; Formats: CD, LP, MC	57	—
C O D E	Released: 5 October 1987; Label: Parlophone; Formats: CD, LP, MC	—	—
Groovy, Laidback and Nasty	Released: 2 April 1990; Label: Parlophone; Formats: CD, LP, MC	—	—
Body and Soul	Release date: March 1991; Label: Les Disques du Crépuscule; Formats: CD, LP, MC	—	—
Plasticity	Release date: 12 October 1992; Label: Plastex; Formats: CD, 2xLP, MC	—	—
International Language	Release date: 8 October 1993; Label: Plastex; Formats: CD, 2xLP, MC	—	—
The Conversation	Release date: 15 June 1994; Label: Apollo, Instinct; Formats: 2xCD, 4xLP	—	—
Shadow of Fear	Release date: 20 November 2020; Label: Mute; Formats: CD, 2xLP, digital download	–	20
Dekadrone	Release date: 26 March 2021; Label: Mute; Formats: CD, 2xLP, digital download	—	—
BN9Drone	Release date: 23 April 2021; Label: Mute; Formats: CD, 2xLP, digital download	—	39
"—" denotes releases that did not chart or were not released in that territory.

=== Live albums ===
Title	Album details	Peak chart positions
Title	Album details	UK Indie
Live at the Y.M.C.A. 27-10-79	Released: January 1980; Label: Rough Trade; Formats: LP	2
Live at the Lyceum	Released: May 1981; Label: Rough Trade; Formats: MC	14
Live in Sheffield 19 Jan 82	Released: February 1982; Label: Paradox; Formats: LP; Released as 'The Pressure Company'	8
Hai! (Live in Japan)	Released: October 1982; Label: Rough Trade; Formats: LP	5
Radiation (BBC Recordings 84–86)	Released: July 1998; Label: NMC Music; Formats: CD	—
Live at the Hacienda '83 / '86; 11.08.83 / 19.02.86.	Released: 27 January 2003; Label: Cherry Red; Formats: 2xCD	—
Archive (Live 1982–1986)	Released: 14 September 2009; Label: Intone; Formats: digital download; iTunes-exclusive; also released as four individual albums	—
Archive #828285: Live	Released: 30 September 2013; Label: Intone; Formats: 3×CD, digital download	—
But What Time Is It Really?	Released: 24 April 2026; Label: Memetune; Formats: LP, CD, digital download	40
"—" denotes releases that did not chart or were not released in that territory.

=== Remix albums ===
Title	Album details
Technology: Western Re-Works 1992	Released: June 1992; Label: Virgin; Formats: CD, 2xLP, MC
Remixed	Released: 9 April 2001; Label: EMI; Formats: CD
Kora! Kora! Kora! The Cabaret Voltaire Versions	Released: 12 March 2009; Label: Shiva; Formats: CD; Remix of Kora's 2007 eponymous album
National Service Rewind	Released: 31 May 2010; Label: Shiva; Formats: CD, digital download; Remix of the Tivoli's 2009 album National Service

=== Soundtrack albums ===
Title	Album details	Peak chart positions
Title	Album details	UK Indie
Johnny YesNo	Released: November 1983; Label: Doublevision; Formats: LP	8
Chance Versus Causality	Released: 30 August 2019; Label: The Grey Area/Mute; Formats: LP; Recorded in 1979 for an obscure Babette Mondini film	—
"—" denotes releases that did not chart or were not released in that territory.

=== Compilation albums ===
Title	Album details
1974–1976	Released: 1980; Label: Industrial; Formats: MC
The Golden Moments of Cabaret Voltaire	Released: November 1987; Label: Rough Trade; Formats: CD
Eight Crepuscule Tracks	Released: February 1988; Label: Interior, Giant; Formats: CD, LP, MC
Listen Up with Cabaret Voltaire	Released: 29 May 1990; Label: Mute; Formats: 2xCD, 2xLP, MC
The Living Legends...	Released: 29 May 1990; Label: The Grey Area/Mute; Formats: CD, 2xLP, MC
The Original Sound of Sheffield '83 / '87. Best Of:	Released: 1 October 2001; Label: Virgin; Formats: CD
The Original Sound of Sheffield '78 / '82. Best Of;	Released: 15 October 2002; Label: Mute; Formats: CD
#7885: Electropunk to Technopop 1978–1985	Released: 23 June 2014; Label: The Grey Area/Mute; Formats: CD, 2xLP, digital download

=== Box sets ===
Title	Album details
Box 1	Released: 21 April 1991; Label: Mute; Formats: 3xCD; Japan-only release
Box 2	Released: 21 April 1991; Label: Mute; Formats: 3xCD; Japan-only release
Conform to Deform '82 / '90. Archive;	Released: 1 October 2001; Label: Virgin; Formats: 3xCD
Methodology '74 / '78. Attic Tapes;	Released: 9 June 2003; Label: The Grey Area/Mute; Formats: 3xCD
Johnny YesNo Redux	Released: 14 November 2011; Label: Mute; Formats: 2xDVD+2xCD
#8385: Collected Works 1983–1985	Released: 11 November 2013; Label: The Grey Area/Mute; Formats: 4xLP+6xCD+2xDVD

=== Video albums ===
Title	Album details
Doublevision Presents: Cabaret Voltaire	Released: July 1982; Label: Doublevision; Formats: VHS, Betamax
Johnny YesNo	Released: 1983; Label: Doublevision; Formats: VHS
Gasoline in Your Eye	Released: July 1985; Label: Virgin Music Video; Formats: VHS, Betamax
Live at the Hacienda '83 / '86; 11.08.83 / 19.02.86.	Released: November 2002; Label: Cherry Red Films; Formats: DVD
Live from London	Released: 11 March 2013; Label: The Store for Music; Formats: DVD

== EPs ==
Title	Album details	Peak chart positions	
Title	Album details	UK	UK Indie
Extended Play	Released: October 1978; Label: Rough Trade; Formats: 7"; Limited release	—	—
3 Crépuscule Tracks	Released: April 1981; Label: Les Disques du Crépuscule, Rough Trade; Formats: 12"	—	—
Drinking Gasoline	Released: 22 July 1985; Label: Some Bizzare/Virgin; Formats: 2x12", LP, MC	71	—
The Drain Train	Released: June 1986; Label: Doublevision; Formats: 2x12", MC	—	5
Percussion Force	Released: June 1991; Label: Les Disques du Crépuscule; Formats: CD, 12"; Belgium-only release	—	—
Colours	Released: November 1991; Label: Plastex; Formats: CD, 12", MC	—	—
Back in the Front of Your Mind	Released: 1993; Label: Instinct; Formats: 12"; US-only release	—	—
Shadow of Funk	Released: 26 February 2021; Label: Mute; Formats: 12", digital download	—	—
"—" denotes releases that did not chart or were not released in that territory.

== Singles ==
Title	Year	Peak chart positions			Albums
Title	Year	UK	UK Indie	US Dance	Albums
"Nag Nag Nag"	1979	—	—	—	The Living Legends...
"Silent Command"	1979	—	10	—	The Living Legends...
"Seconds Too Late"	1980	—	8	—	The Living Legends...
"Jazz the Glass"	1981	—	6	—	The Living Legends...
"Eddie's Out"	1981	—	6	—	The Living Legends...
"Fools Game" (Belgium and Italy-only release)	1983	—	—	—	Non-album single
"Crackdown"	1983	—	—	—	The Crackdown
"Yashar"	1983	122	6	—	2x45
"Just Fascination"	1983	94	—	—	The Crackdown
"The Dream Ticket"	1983	108	—	—	Non-album single
"James Brown"	1984	100	—	—	Micro-Phonies
"Sensoria"	1984	96	—	—	Micro-Phonies
"I Want You"	1985	91	—	—	The Covenant, the Sword, and the Arm of the Lord
"Don't Argue"	1987	69	—	16	C O D E
"Here to Go"	1987	88	—	16	C O D E
"Hypnotised"	1989	66	—	—	Groovy, Laidback and Nasty
"Keep On"	1990	55	—	—	Groovy, Laidback and Nasty
"Easy Life"	1990	61	—	—	Groovy, Laidback and Nasty
"What Is Real" (Belgium-only release)	1991	—	—	—	Body and Soul
"I Want You" / "Kino" (remixes)	1992	—	—	—	Technology: Western Re-Works 1992
"Just Fascination" (remix)	2001	—	—	—	Conform to Deform '82 / '90. Archive;
"Nag Nag Nag" (original + remixes)	2002	83	—	—	The Original Sound of Sheffield '78 / '82. Best Of;
"Yashar" (remixes)	2003	—	—	—	Non-album single
"Vasto"	2020	—	—	—	Shadow of Fear
"—" denotes releases that did not chart or were not released in that territory.

=== Selected compilation appearances ===
- A Factory Sample (1978) – "Baader Meinhof" and "Sex in Secret"
- C81 (1981) – "Raising the Count"
- A Diamond Hidden in the Mouth of a Corpse (1985) – "Dead Man's Shoes"
- Salvation! Original soundtrack (1987) – "Twanky Party" and "Jesus Saves"
- Wasted: The Best of Volume, Part I (1995) – "Low Cool" (remix)
- Some Bizzare Artists: Redefining the Prologue (2006) – "Crackdown"
