= The Original Sound of Sheffield '78/'82 =

Greatest hits album by Cabaret Voltaire
- Released: 2002
- Recorded: 1978–1982
- Genre: Experimental, punk rock, post-punk, industrial, musique concrete
- Length: 64:58
- Label: Mute

Cabaret Voltaire chronology
Conform to Deform '82/'90 (2001)	The Original Sound of Sheffield '78/'82 (2002)

Professional ratings
Review scores
Source	Rating
Allmusic	4.5/5 stars
The Encyclopedia of Popular Music	3/5 stars
Pitchfork Media	8.0/10

The Original Sound of Sheffield '78/'82 is a best-of compilation by Cabaret Voltaire. It is the third in a series of best-of compilations for the band, also including The Original Sound of Sheffield '83/'87 and Conform to Deform '82/'90. Compared to the other two compilations, however, this one focuses on a more primal period of Cabaret Voltaire's career, with more experimentation than their later, house-influenced work. The booklet includes an interview with the band as well as photos from the era.

== Track listing ==
No.	Title	Writer(s)	Length
1.	"Do the Mussolini (Headkick)" (from Extended Play, 1978)	Cabaret Voltaire	3:05
2.	"The Set Up" (from Extended Play, 1978)	Cabaret Voltaire	4:47
3.	"Baader Meinhof" (from A Factory Sample, 1978)	Cabaret Voltaire	3:23
4.	"Nag Nag Nag" (from Nag Nag Nag 7", 1979)	Cabaret Voltaire	4:37
5.	"Silent Command" (from Silent Command 7", 1979)	Cabaret Voltaire	4:07
6.	"No Escape" (from Mix-Up, 1979)	Cabaret Voltaire	3:36
7.	"This Is Entertainment" (from The Voice of America, 1980)	Cabaret Voltaire	6:02
8.	"Obsession" (from The Voice of America, 1980)	Cabaret Voltaire	5:17
9.	"Seconds Too Late" (from Seconds Too Late 7", 1980)	Cabaret Voltaire	4:21
10.	"Split Second Feeling" (from Red Mecca, 1981)	Cabaret Voltaire	3:52
11.	"Spread the Virus" (from Red Mecca, 1981)	Cabaret Voltaire	3:44
12.	"Yashar" (from 2X45, 1982)	Cabaret Voltaire	5:11
13.	"Wait and Shuffle" (from 2X45, 1982)	Cabaret Voltaire	8:08
14.	"Loosen the Clamp" (from the short film Johnny Yesno, 1982, not included on the soundtrack album, first released on 1982 NME "Mighty Reel" cassette compilation)	Cabaret Voltaire	4:48
