= The Original Sound of Sheffield '83/'87 =

Greatest hits album by Cabaret Voltaire
- Released: 11 December 2001
- Recorded: 1983–1987
- Genre: Industrial, house, acid house, dance, experimental, post-punk
- Length: 74:33
- Label: Some Bizarre Ltd

Cabaret Voltaire chronology
The Original Sound of Sheffield '83/'87 (2001)	Conform to Deform '82/'90 (2001)

Professional ratings
Review scores
Source	Rating
Allmusic	4.5/5 stars
The Encyclopedia of Popular Music	4/5 stars
NME	8/10
Tom Hull	A

The Original Sound of Sheffield '83/'87 is a Some Bizzare Label greatest hits compilation.

== Reception ==
Sean Carruthers of Allmusic said of the compilation, "This is the sound that launched a thousand techno acts." Victoria Segal of NME said, "This fine compilation ... shows Cabaret Voltaire emerging from the gloom of industrial experimentation into the bright lights of proto-house."

== Track listing ==
No.	Title	Writer(s)	Length
1.	"Just Fascination" (John Luongo 12" mix, original on "The Crackdown", 1983)	Cabaret Voltaire	8:15
2.	"Crackdown" (John Luongo 12" mix, original on "The Crackdown", 1983)	Cabaret Voltaire	8:32
3.	"Dream Ticket" (12" mix, original on "The Dream Ticket" / "Safety Zone" single, 1983))	Cabaret Voltaire	7:49
4.	"Sensoria" (12" mix, original on "Micro-Phonies", 1984)	Cabaret Voltaire	7:51
5.	"James Brown" (12" mix, original on "Micro-Phonies", 1984)	Cabaret Voltaire	7:39
6.	"Kino" (12" mix, original on Drinking Gasoline EP, 1985)	Cabaret Voltaire	8:29
7.	"I Want You" (12" mix, original on "The Covenant, The Sword and The Arm Of The Lord", 1985)	Cabaret Voltaire	7:50
8.	"Don't Argue" (John Robie Extended Version, original on "Code", 1987)	Cabaret Voltaire	7:31
9.	"Here to Go" (Kevorkian Extended Mix, original on "Code", 1987)	Cabaret Voltaire	6:58
10.	"Thank You America" (Kevorkian Bonus Beats, original on "Code", 1987 (previously unreleased))	Cabaret Voltaire	3:39
