= Live at the Y.M.C.A. 27-10-79 =

Live at the Y.M.C.A 27-10-79

Live album by Cabaret Voltaire
- Released: 1980
- Recorded: October 27, 1979
- Genre: Industrial
- Length: 39:19
- Label: Rough Trade
- Producer: Cabaret Voltaire

Cabaret Voltaire chronology
Mix-Up (1979)	Live at the Y.M.C.A 27-10-79 (1980)	Three Mantras (1980)

Live at the Y.M.C.A 27-10-79 is a live album by industrial/post-punk band Cabaret Voltaire, recorded in 1979 and originally released in 1980 by Rough Trade. It was re-released on CD in 1990 on Mute Records in the UK and on Restless Records in the USA. The album contains a cover of The Velvet Underground's "Here She Comes Now" from their album White Light/White Heat.

== Reception ==
Professional ratings
Review scores
Source	Rating
AllMusic	3/5 stars
The Encyclopedia of Popular Music	2/5 stars
New Musical Express	6/10
Record Mirror	4/5 stars
The Rolling Stone Album Guide	2/5 stars
Select	3/5
Smash Hits	7/10
Sounds	4/5 stars
Spin Alternative Record Guide	6/10
Uncut	2/5 stars

Wilson Neate in AllMusic said, "Although this album isn't easy listening – and of course it wasn't intended to be – it documents Cabaret Voltaire's role as electro-industrial pioneers. Marc Ross at Trouser Press asserted that Live at the YMCA was more accessible than their debut album Mix-Up, going on to say: "There are strong intelligences at work here. What's fascinating is that live they maintain the style and imagination displayed in the studio... and absorb ambient sounds (audience, hall) into their music."

== Track listing ==
All songs written by Cabaret Voltaire except for "No Escape", by Sky Saxon and "Here She Comes Now", by Lou Reed.

1. "Untitled" - 5:51
2. "On Every Other Street" - 4:16
3. "Nag, Nag, Nag" - 4:55
4. "The Set Up" - 4:13
5. "Expect Nothing" - 6:18
6. "Havoc" - 3:02
7. "Here She Comes Now" - 4:12
8. "No Escape" - 3:42
9. "Baader Meinhof" - 4:10

== Notes ==
Recorded on a cassette player October 27, 1979 and cut at Portland Recording Studios.
Track 1 was later recorded and included in the LP The Voice of America under the title "Damage Is Done."

== Personnel ==
Cabaret Voltaire

- Chris Watson - electronic tape
- Stephen Mallinder - bass, percussion, vocals
- Richard H. Kirk - guitar, wind instruments
