= Radiation (BBC Recordings 84–86) =

Live album by Cabaret Voltaire
- Recorded: 1984 and 1986
- Length: 60:00
- Producer: John Sparrow; Dale Griffin; Bary Andrews

Professional ratings
Review scores
Source	Rating
The Encyclopedia of Popular Music	3/5 stars

Radiation (BBC Recordings 84–86) is a collection of recordings from Cabaret Voltaire during their most accessible period. They were also made in the BBC's studios with in-house producers and engineers rather than the usual self-produced material at Western Works studios.

== Track listing ==
1. "Sensoria" - 4:27
2. "Digital Rasta" - 4:43
3. "Kind" - 4:38
4. "Ruthless" - 3:57
5. "Sleep Walking" - 5:55
6. "Big Funk" - 5:56
7. "The Operative" - 3:35
8. "You Like To Torment Me" - 5:33
9. "Hey! Hey!" - 3:47
10. "We've Got Heart" - 4:44
11. "Sex, Money, Freaks" - 4:16
12. "I Want You" - 4:31
13. "Doom Zoom" - 5:01

== Personnel ==
Cabaret Voltaire

- Stephen Mallinder - bass, vocals
- Richard H. Kirk - sequencers, synthesizers, programming, electric guitar, saxophone, electric violin
- Mark Tattersall - drums, percussion

with:

- Alan Fisch - drums, percussion on "I Want You"

== Notes ==
- Tracks 1 through 4 come from the October 18, 1984 Session with Janice Long
- Tracks 5 through 7 come from the October 22, 1984 Session with John Peel
- Tracks 8 through 11 come from the August 6, 1986 Session with Janice Long
- Tracks 12 and 13 are non BBC Material
