= Mix-Up =

Studio album by Cabaret Voltaire
- Released: 23 October 1979
- Recorded: July–August 1979
- Studio: Western Works, Sheffield
- Genre: Industrial; post-punk
- Length: 43:01
- Label: Rough Trade
- Producer: Cabaret Voltaire

Cabaret Voltaire chronology
Extended Play (1978)	Mix-Up (1979)	Live at the Y.M.C.A. (1980)

Mix-Up is the debut studio album by English band Cabaret Voltaire. It was released on 23 October 1979, through record label Rough Trade.

== Content ==
The album contains a cover of The Seeds' song "No Escape" from their 1966 eponymous debut album.

== Critical reception ==
Professional ratings
Review scores
Source	Rating
AllMusic	2.5/5 stars
Blender	3/5 stars
The Encyclopedia of Popular Music	3/5 stars
Muzik	2/5 stars
Record Mirror	4.5/5 stars
The Rolling Stone Album Guide	2/5 stars
Smash Hits	5/10
Spin Alternative Record Guide	7/10
Trouser Press	neutral
ZigZag	8/10

Writing in Smash Hits in 1979, Red Starr said the album was an "intriguing but only occasionally attractive array of verbal and musical images". Starr went on to say that it sounded like "pointless backroom self indulgence". Steven Grant echoed Starr's ambivalence in Trouser Press, saying that the album "has an obsessive strength — like Eno in his stranger moments but without his repetitiveness," but that "The music, though fascinating, is rarely coherent."

In a retrospective review, Head Heritage described Mix-Up as "a great snapshot of a brief period in post-punk UK when there was a sudden urge to grapple with a bizarre, homemade, hamfisted white dub landscape." AllMusic writer Andy Kellman was less favourable, writing that "Cabaret Voltaire's first two proper studio albums hardly match the greatness of later works like Red Mecca, 2 X 45 and even 3 Crepuscule Tracks", while noting that Mix-Up "only helped solidify Cabaret Voltaire's status as an integral part of the extended frisson of 1978–1982 post-punk".

== Track listing ==
All tracks are written by Cabaret Voltaire (Chris Watson, Richard H. Kirk, Stephen Mallinder), except as noted

Side A
No.	Title	Writer(s)	Length
1.	"Kirlian Photograph"		5:32
2.	"No Escape"	Sky Saxon	3:34
3.	"Fourth Shot"		3:57
4.	"Heaven and Hell"		5:45
5.	"Eyeless Sight" (live)		3:12

Side B
No.	Title	Writer(s)	Length
1.	"Photophobia"	lyrics: "Victor"	5:49
2.	"On Every Other Street"		4:01
3.	"Expect Nothing"		6:05
4.	"Capsules"		4:04

== Personnel ==
Cabaret Voltaire

- Stephen Mallinder – vocals, bass guitar, percussion
- Chris Watson – synthesizers, tapes
- Richard H. Kirk – guitar, synthesizers, wind instruments
- Haydn Boyes Weston – drums

Additional personnel

- Porky – mastering
