= Darkness at Noon (disambiguation) =

Darkness at Noon is a novel by Arthur Koestler.

Darkness at Noon may also refer to:

- Darkness at Noon (A Hawk and a Hacksaw album), 2005
- Darkness at Noon (Richard H. Kirk album), 1999
- Mahiru no ankoku (Darkness in the Noon), a 1956 Japanese film

== See also ==
- Dark at Noon, comedy film
- Polar night, the opposite phenomenon of the midnight sun, or polar day
