= International language =

International language may refer to:

- Esperanto, whose original name was international language
  - Unua Libro or Dr. Esperanto's International Language, the first book detailing Esperanto
- International auxiliary language, a language meant for communication between people who do not share a common native language
- International English, a concept of the English language as a global means of communication
- International Sign
- Lingua franca, any language widely used beyond the population of its native speakers
- Love
- Mathematics
- Music
- Universal language, a hypothetical historical or mythical language said to be spoken and understood by all of the world's population
- World language, a language spoken internationally

== Other uses ==
- International Language (album), a 1993 album by Cabaret Voltaire
