= Knowledge Through Science =

1998 solo album by Richard H. Kirk

Studio album by Richard H. Kirk
- Released: 1998
- Label: Blast First
- Producer: Richard H. Kirk

Richard H. Kirk chronology
The Number of Magic (1995)	Knowledge Through Science (1998)	Darkness at Noon (1999)

Knowledge Through Science is a solo album by Richard H. Kirk of Cabaret Voltaire. The release was a limited edition of 500 copies of the CD printed by "Irregular", who promoted a Richard H. Kirk gig at The Garage, London, on 23 July 1998. About half of the copies were given away for free after the gig. Shortly after, the album was commercially released by Blast First.

This album has a reputation at several radio stations, including KFJC and WFMU, as being appropriate for "night time air play only," due to its strange and dark undertones.

== Track listing ==
1. "Knowledge Through Science" (37:19)

== Personnel ==
- Produced and recorded by Richard H. Kirk
