= Black Jesus Voice =

Studio album by Richard H. Kirk
- Released: 1986
- Recorded: 1986
- Studio: Western Works Studios
- Label: Rough Trade
- Producer: Richard H. Kirk

Richard H. Kirk chronology
| Time High Fiction (1983) | Black Jesus Voice (1986) | Ugly Spirit (1986) |

Black Jesus Voice is a solo album by Richard H. Kirk, released by Rough Trade Records in 1986. The album was also released on cassette doubled up with Kirk's Ugly Spirit album. In 1995, The Grey Area (Mute) re-released the CD.

== Track listing ==
1. "Streetgang (It Really Hurts)"
2. "Hipnotic"
3. "Boom Shala"
4. "Black Jesus Voice"
5. "Martyrs of Palestine"
6. "This Is the H-Bomb Sound"
7. "Short Wave"

== Personnel ==
- Richard H. Kirk: All vocals and instruments.
- Produced and recorded by Richard H. Kirk
