= Soul catcher (disambiguation) =

A soul catcher is a shamanic amulet.

Soul catcher may also refer to:

- Soul Catcher (novel), a 1972 novel by Frank Herbert
- Soul Catcher, a character in the novel series Riley Bloom by Alyson Noel
- "Soul Catcher", a 1993 song on the album Virtual State by Richard Kirk
- "Soul Catcher", a 1997 song on the album Rude System by the Ballistic Brothers
- "Soul Catcher", a 2000 song by on the album NakedSelf by the The
