= Johnny Yesno (soundtrack) =

Johnny Yesno: The Original Soundtrack from the Motion Picture

Soundtrack album by Cabaret Voltaire
- Released: November 1983
- Recorded: June 1981
- Genre: Industrial, ambient, soundtrack
- Length: 41:11
- Label: Doublevision (original)
- Producer: Cabaret Voltaire

Cabaret Voltaire chronology
The Crackdown (1983)	Johnny Yesno: The Original Soundtrack from the Motion Picture (1983)	Micro-Phonies (1984)

Professional ratings
Review scores
Source	Rating
Allmusic	2/5 stars
The Encyclopedia of Popular Music	3/5 stars
Record Mirror	1/5 stars
The Rolling Stone Album Guide	2/5 stars
Spin Alternative Record Guide	6/10

Johnny Yesno: The Original Soundtrack from the Motion Picture is an album by industrial band Cabaret Voltaire. It was made as a soundtrack to Peter Care's film of the same title, which in turn led to Peter Care directing the video for Cabaret Voltaire's hit song "Sensoria". This started a music video-making career for Peter Care, who has since then directed videos for R.E.M., Bruce Springsteen, Roy Orbison, and Depeche Mode, amongst others.

== Track listing ==
Side A:

1. "Taxi Music" – 14:34
2. "Hallucination Sequence" – 4:49

Side B:

1. "D.T.'s / Cold Turkey" – 4:10
2. "The Quarry (In the Wilderness)" – 5:19
3. "Title Sequence" – 3:35
4. "Taxi Music Dub" – 8:33

== Personnel ==
Cabaret Voltaire

- Stephen Mallinder – vocals, bass
- Richard H. Kirk – guitars, keyboards, tapes
- Chris Watson – keyboards, tapes, drum computers
