= Time High Fiction =

Studio album by Richard H. Kirk
- Released: 1983
- Recorded: October 1979 – April 1982
- Studio: Western Works Studio, Sheffield, Yorkshire, England
- Length: 81:08
- Label: Doublevision
- Producer: Richard H. Kirk

Richard H. Kirk chronology
Disposable Half-Truths (1980)	Time High Fiction (1983)	Black Jesus Voice (1986)

Time High Fiction is the second solo album by Cabaret Voltaire member Richard H. Kirk. Featuring material recorded at the band's Western Works Studio in Sheffield between October 1979 and April 1982, it was originally released as a double LP on the Doublevision label in 1983, and later re-released on CD by The Grey Area.

== Track listing ==
1. "The Greedy Eye" (5:05)
2. "Shaking Down the Tower of Babel" (3:15)
3. "Force of Habit" (7:09)
4. "Day of Waiting" (4:49)
5. "Black Honeymoon" (5:34)
6. "Nocturnal Children" (4:20)
7. "Wiretrap" (6:31)
8. "The Power of Autosuggestion" (5:01)
9. "Dead Relatives Part One" (20:47)
10. "Dead Relatives Part Two" (18:37)

== Personnel ==
- Richard H. Kirk - all instruments
