= Extended Play (Cabaret Voltaire EP) =

EP by Cabaret Voltaire
- Released: November 1978
- Recorded: 1978
- Studio: Western Works, Sheffield
- Genre: Minimal wave, industrial
- Length: 15:42
- Label: Rough Trade
- Producer: Cabaret Voltaire

Cabaret Voltaire extended plays chronology
Extended Play (1978)	Three Mantras (1980)

Professional ratings
Review scores
Source	Rating
Spin Alternative Record Guide	8/10

Extended Play is an extended play and the debut release by English industrial band Cabaret Voltaire. It was released in November 1978 through record label Rough Trade.

== Track listing ==
All tracks are written by Cabaret Voltaire (Richard H. Kirk, Stephen Mallinder and Chris Watson), except "Here She Comes Now", written by Lou Reed

Side A
No.	Title	Length
1.	"Talkover"	3:22
2.	"Here She Comes Now" (The Velvet Underground cover)	4:30

Side B
No.	Title	Length
1.	"Do the Mussolini-Headkick"	3:03
2.	"The Set Up"	4:47

== Personnel ==
Cabaret Voltaire

- Richard H. Kirk – guitar, vocals, production, recording, sleeve design
- Stephen Mallinder – bass guitar, vocals, production, recording, sleeve design
- Chris Watson – keyboards, tape operation, vocals, production, recording, sleeve design

Technical

- A Porky Prime Cut (Porky) – cutting
- Rod (Rod Siddall) – sleeve photography
