= Darkness at Noon (Richard H. Kirk album) =

Darkness At Noon

Studio album by Richard H. Kirk
- Released: 1999
- Label: Touch
- Producer: Richard H. Kirk

Richard H. Kirk chronology
Knowledge Through Science (1998)	Darkness At Noon (1999)

Darkness At Noon is a solo album by Richard H. Kirk of Cabaret Voltaire. Released originally by Touch Records Recorded at Western Works Studios, Sheffield, England, as part of a performance for Phonotaktik, Wien, Austria, April 1999. Licensed from Alphaphone Recordings, Sheffield.

== Track listing ==
1. "Darkness At Noon" (38:00)

== Personnel ==
- Produced and recorded by Richard H. Kirk
