= Shadow of Fear (album) =

Studio album by Cabaret Voltaire
- Released: 20 November 2020
- Recorded: July 2014–April 2020
- Studio: Western Works (Sheffield)
- Genres: Electronic; industrial
- Length: 58:15
- Label: Mute
- Producer: Richard H. Kirk

Cabaret Voltaire chronology
The Conversation (1994)	Shadow of Fear (2020)	Shadow of Funk (2021)

Singles from Shadow of Fear
- 1. "Vasto" Released: 19 August 2020

Shadow of Fear is a studio album by Cabaret Voltaire, a project of English musician Richard H. Kirk. It was released on 20 November 2020 through Mute Records. It received generally favorable reviews from critics.

== Background ==
Shadow of Fear was recorded and mixed at Western Works, which is the same studio that Cabaret Voltaire has used throughout their history. The album is Cabaret Voltaire's first release with Richard H. Kirk as the sole member of the band. It is Cabaret Voltaire's first studio album since The Conversation (1994).

"Vasto" was released on 19 August 2020, as a single from the album. The album was released on 20 November 2020 through Mute Records.

Shadow of Fear is the first installment in a series of four Cabaret Voltaire releases, followed by the Shadow of Funk EP (2021), as well as two drone albums, Dekadrone (2021) and BN9Drone (2021).

== Critical reception ==
Professional ratings
Aggregate scores
Source	Rating
Metacritic	79/100
Review scores
Source	Rating
AllMusic	4/5 stars
The Arts Desk	5/5 stars
Flood Magazine	7/10
The Guardian	4/5 stars
MusicOMH	4/5 stars
Pitchfork	6.8/10
Uncut	8/10

According to the review aggregator Metacritic, Shadow of Fear received "generally favorable reviews" based on a weighted average score of 79 out of 100 from 8 critic scores.

Guy Oddy of The Arts Desk described Shadow of Fear as "a fine album of raw and disorientating electronica, dub and motorik sounds with bags of punk attitude and a dancefloor heavy vibe." Paul Simpson of AllMusic stated, "Even though Kirk used a restrained setup of vintage equipment to make Shadow of Fear, his vibrant energy and 'don't look back' attitude keep the album sounding fresh and forward-thinking." Robert Ham of Pitchfork wrote, "While not as pulverizing as the group's early recordings nor as sleek as the techno and house-inspired work found on 1993's International Language, it blends the various eras of the group into a mostly satisfying whole."

== Track listing ==
All tracks are written by Richard H. Kirk.

Shadow of Fear track listing
No.	Title	Length
1.	"Be Free"	6:24
2.	"The Power (Of Their Knowledge)"	6:30
3.	"Night of the Jackal"	6:37
4.	"Microscopic Flesh Fragment"	6:02
5.	"Papa Nine Zero Delta United"	7:43
6.	"Universal Energy"	10:58
7.	"Vasto"	7:40
8.	"What's Goin' On"	6:24
Total length:		58:15

== Personnel ==
Credits adapted from liner notes.

- Richard H. Kirk – production, arrangement
- Denis Blackham – mastering
- Barnes&Barnes – artwork
- Phil Wolstenholme – layout

== Charts ==
Chart performance for Shadow of Fear
Chart (2020)	Peak position
Scottish Albums (Official Charts)	72
UK Dance Albums (Official Charts)	2
UK Album Downloads (Official Charts)	63
UK Independent Albums (Official Charts)	20
