= El Tren Fantasma =

Album by Chris Watson

Studio album by Chris Watson
- Released: 9 November 2011 (mail order) (United Kingdom); 14 November 2011 (store release) (United Kingdom)
- Genre: Avant-garde; electronic; experimental; field recording
- Label: Touch Music TO:42

Chris Watson chronology
| Weather Report (2003) | El Tren Fantasma (2011) |

El Tren Fantasma is a 2011 album by Chris Watson. It was released on 14 November 2011 by independent record label Touch Music on CD and 12" vinyl record.

== Background ==
On January 26, 1999, the fourth episode "Los Mochis to Veracruz" of the fourth season of Great Railway Journeys was broadcast. The episode was presented by chef Rick Stein and featured the "Ghost Train" which traveled over a now-defunct railway Ferrocarriles Nacionales de México between Los Mochis to Veracruz. Chris Watson spent a month (or five weeks) working as a BBC audio recorder for the programme. In 2010, El Tren Fantasma was broadcast on BBC Radio 4.

== Track listing ==
=== CD release ===
| No. | Title | Length |
|---|---|---|
| 1. | "La Anunciante" | 4:00 |
| 2. | "Los Mochis" | 6:29 |
| 3. | "Sierra Tarahumara" | 5:24 |
| 4. | "El Divisadero" | 5:34 |
| 5. | "Crucero La Joya" | 4:58 |
| 6. | "Chihuahua" | 4:34 |
| 7. | "Aguascalientes" | 3:26 |
| 8. | "Mexico D.F." | 9:14 |
| 9. | "El Tajin" | 10:16 |
| 10. | "Veracruz" | 5:44 |

=== The Signal Man's Mix iTunes release ===
| No. | Title | Length |
|---|---|---|
| 1. | "El Divisadero (The Telegraph)" | 7:56 |
| 2. | "Veracruz (The Tunnel)" | 7:54 |

=== The Signal Man's Mix vinyl release ===
| No. | Title | Length |
|---|---|---|
| 1. | "El Divisadero - The Telegraph" | 7:52 |
| 2. | "Veracruz - The Tunnel" | 7:50 |

== Reception ==
Professional ratings
Aggregate scores
| Source | Rating |
|---|---|
| Metacritic | 82/100 |
Review scores
| Source | Rating |
| AllMusic | 4/5 stars |
| PopMatters | 9/10 |
| Q | 4/5 stars |
| Record Collector | 4/5 stars |

Pitchfork's Grayson Currin called El Tren Fantasma for "one of the best works of his career" with "an [sic] sonic adventure that consistently shifts from power electronics-like heaviness to the sunny-day delicacy." BBC Music's Spencer Grady praised the album for "Watson's ability to create whole worlds, entire lifetimes in the listener's imagination, beyond the moment of recording, comes to the fore." Musicworks's René van Peer also favoured the album with "[Watson] has painted fantastic, surreal images in sound."

AllMusic's Ned Raggett reviewed the album with "it's a marvelous portrayal in miniature of the tensions between the 'natural' and the 'man-made'." The Quietus's Luke Turner said it was a "haunting, powerful tribute and memorial to a marvel of engineering and the people who built, worked and travelled upon it."

== Personnel ==
Production

- Jon Wozencroft – art direction
- Denis Blackham – mastered by
- Caminos de Hierro – photography by
- Ana Gonzalez Bello – voice actor [station announcer]
