= The Number of Magic =

Studio album by Richard H. Kirk
- Released: 1995
- Label: Warp Records; Wax Trax!
- Producer: Richard H. Kirk

Richard H. Kirk chronology
Virtual State (1993)	The Number of Magic (1995)	Knowledge Through Science (1998)

The Number of Magic is an album by the English musician Richard H. Kirk, released in 1995.

== Critical reception ==
Professional ratings
Review scores
Source	Rating
AllMusic	4.5/5 stars
The Sydney Morning Herald	3/5 stars

The Sydney Morning Herald deemed the album "a collection of almost-songs enlivened by [Kirk's] continuing fondness for blips, analogue sounds, distorted scraps of speech, exposing the chaos lurking behind the orderly veneer of technology."

AllMusic wrote that "Kirk uses an incredibly wide variety of sources for this album of gorgeous ambient ethno-funk, including electro, bleep, techno and Eastern melodies."

The Wire was less positive, describing the album as "a tepid amalgam of dub, ambient, Detroit techno and 70s funk colliding with world music."

== Track listing ==
1. "Lost Souls on Funk" – 8:12
2. "Love is Deep" – 7:44
3. "So Digital" – 7:34
4. "Indole Ring" – 8:40
5. "East of Nima" – 9:41
6. "Atomic" – 6:38
7. "Poets Saints Revolutionaries" – 9:28
8. "Monochrome Dream" – 9:31
9. "The Number of Magic" – 10:07

== Personnel ==
- Richard H. Kirk: all instruments
