= BN9Drone =

Studio album by Cabaret Voltaire
- Released: 23 April 2021
- Recorded: July 2014–April 2020
- Studio: Western Works (Sheffield)
- Genre: Drone
- Length: 64:01
- Label: Mute
- Producer: Richard H. Kirk

Cabaret Voltaire chronology
Dekadrone (2021)	BN9Drone (2021)

BN9Drone is a studio album by Cabaret Voltaire, a project of English musician Richard H. Kirk. It was released on 23 April 2021 through Mute Records. It received generally favorable reviews from critics.

== Background ==
BN9Drone is the final installment in a series of four Cabaret Voltaire releases, following Shadow of Fear (2020), the Shadow of Funk EP (2021), and Dekadrone (2021).

In 2020, Richard H. Kirk released Shadow of Fear, Cabaret Voltaire's first studio album since The Conversation (1994). He then released a three-track EP, Shadow of Funk, on 26 February 2021. A 50-minute piece, titled Dekadrone, was released on 26 March 2021. A 64-minute piece, titled BN9Drone, was released on 23 April 2021.

Kirk died on 21 September 2021 at the age of 65, and BN9Drone became his final studio album.

== Critical reception ==
Professional ratings
Aggregate scores
Source	Rating
Metacritic	71/100
Review scores
Source	Rating
AllMusic	3/5 stars
Mojo	3/5 stars
MusicOMH	4.5/5 stars
Uncut	8/10

According to the review aggregator Metacritic, BN9Drone received "generally favorable reviews" based on a weighted average score of 71 out of 100 from 4 critic scores.

Paul Simpson of AllMusic described the album as "another apocalyptic soundscape filled with heavy washes of distortion and ominous voices that seem like broken transmissions from across a battlefield." Matt Cotsell of MusicOMH commented that "there is no feeling of calm to be found in its presence, or hope for serenity as it surveys and assaults at every turn." He added, "Disorientating swatches of subterranean noise belie the track's association with the airborne delivery device, so beloved of peeping toms, capitalists and warmongers the world over." Sharon O'Connell of Uncut stated, "this is a dark, heavy and deceptively simple electronic soundscape, masterfully composed, its vast, rumbling plain recalling recent shots of Mars' arid surface, disrupted by the urgent crackling of police comms and flares of violent white noise."

== Track listing ==
BN9Drone track listing
No.	Title	Writer(s)	Length
1.	"BN9Drone"	Richard H. Kirk	64:01

== Personnel ==
Credits adapted from liner notes.

- Richard H. Kirk – production, arrangement
- Denis Blackham – mastering
- Barnes&Barnes – artwork
- Phil Wolstenholme – layout

== Charts ==
Chart performance for BN9Drone
Chart (2021)	Peak position
UK Dance Albums (Official Charts)	14
UK Independent Albums (Official Charts)	39
