= Disposable Half-Truths =

Studio album by Richard H. Kirk
- Released: 1980
- Recorded: Western Works Studio
- Label: Industrial
- Producer: Richard H. Kirk

Richard H. Kirk chronology
Disposable Half-Truths (1980)	Time High Fiction (1983)

Disposable Half-Truths is the debut solo album by Richard H. Kirk, released originally on cassette by Industrial Records in 1980. Recorded at Western Works Studio. In 1992, The Grey Area re-released the CD version.

== Track listing ==
1. "Synesthesia"
2. "Outburst"
3. "Information Therapy"
4. "Magic Words Command"
5. "Thermal Damage"
6. "Plate Glass Replicas"
7. "Insect Friends of Allah"
8. "Scatalist"
9. "False Erotic Love"
10. "L.D. 50"
11. "L.D. 60"
12. "Amnesic Disassociation"

== Personnel ==
- Produced and recorded by Richard H. Kirk
