= Body and Soul (Cabaret Voltaire album) =

Studio album by Cabaret Voltaire
- Released: March 1991
- Studio: Western Works, Sheffield
- Label: Les Disques du Crépuscule
- Producer: Cabaret Voltaire

Cabaret Voltaire chronology
Groovy, Laidback and Nasty (1990)	Body and Soul (1991)	Plasticity (1992)

Body and Soul is the tenth studio album by English electronic band Cabaret Voltaire, released in March 1991 by Belgium-based label Les Disques du Crépuscule.

== Reception ==
Professional ratings
Review scores
Source	Rating
The Encyclopedia of Popular Music	3/5 stars
New Musical Express	7/10
Q	3/5 stars
Record Mirror	8/10
(The New) Rolling Stone Album Guide	3/5 stars
Spin Alternative Record Guide	7/10

Music historian Colin Larkin wrote that the album was "well-received" and "consolidated Cabaret Voltaire's pivotal position on the UK's dance scene". Martin Aston in Q Magazine called the album "nothing radical but by their own standards, a rewarding leap sideways." A positive review by Music from the Empty Quarter noted the dichotomy engendered in the album, stating that "[A]nyone expecting a return of the Cabs harder sounds... can forget it" but that "[T]he familiar unorthodox sounds lie in the undercurrents, ensuring that it's never an easy movement."

== Composition ==
All tracks are composed, arranged and produced by Richard H. Kirk and Stephen Mallinder at Western Works, Sheffield, England.

== Content ==
The release features cover art by Jerome B-Patou.

This album was the last to feature Stephen Mallinder's lead vocals.

== Release ==
Body and Soul was released in March 1991 by Belgium-based label Les Disques du Crépuscule on vinyl, CD and cassette.

== Track listing ==
All tracks composed and arranged by Richard H. Kirk and Stephen Mallinder.

1. "No Resistance" – 6:22
2. "Shout" – 6:43
3. "Happy" – 6:21
4. "Decay" – 2:23
5. "Bad Chemistry" – 6:14
6. "Vibration" – 7:12
7. "What Is Real" – 7:07
8. "Western Land" – 3:18
9. "Don't Walk Away" (CD bonus track) – 5:17
10. "Alien Nation Funk" (CD bonus track) – 7:07
11. "What Is Real (Dreamtime Mix)" (CD bonus track) – 7:03

== Personnel ==
Cabaret Voltaire

- Stephen Mallinder – vocals, keyboards
- Richard H. Kirk – keyboards and computer-generated instrumentation
