= Three Mantras =

Studio album by Cabaret Voltaire
- Released: May 1980
- Recorded: January 1980
- Studio: Western Works, Sheffield
- Genre: Industrial, post-punk
- Length: 40:50
- Label: Rough Trade
- Producer: Cabaret Voltaire

Cabaret Voltaire chronology
Live at the Y.M.C.A. 27-10-79 (1980)	Three Mantras (1980)	The Voice of America (1980)

Professional ratings
Review scores
Source	Rating
AllMusic	3/5 stars
The Encyclopedia of Popular Music	2/5 stars
New Musical Express	6/10
The Rolling Stone Album Guide	2/5 stars
Select	3/5
Spin Alternative Record Guide	8/10
Uncut	4/5 stars

Three Mantras is the second studio album by English band Cabaret Voltaire. It was released in May 1980 by Rough Trade.

== Background and reception ==
Record Mirror originally publicised Three Mantras as, '..what's been described as "the world's longest single"..', evidently referring to a press release supplied by the group's label, Rough Trade. The album was packaged in an intentionally confusing manner, with the 'Eastern' and 'Western' titles reversed on the cover, the same label on both sides and a sticker on early pressings apologizing for there only being two mantras (despite the title) and explaining that the album was being priced as a single to make up for it. The reversed vocal that runs all the way through 'Eastern Mantra' is the name of another Sheffield electronic band; The Human League.

According to Trouser Press, Three Mantras is "the group's first explicit venture into non-Western musical forms". It further commented, "The record also marks a shift in technique, as musical demands take precedence over production to strange and beautiful effect."

== Track listing ==
Side A
No.	Title	Length
1.	"Western Mantra"	20:39

Side B
No.	Title	Length
2.	"Eastern Mantra"	20:11

== Personnel ==
Cabaret Voltaire

- Richard H. Kirk – guitar, wind instruments
- Stephen Mallinder – bass guitar, vocals, electronic percussion
- Chris Watson – synthesizers, tapes

Additional personnel

- John Clayton – percussion (on "Eastern Mantra")
- Jane – tapes, Jerusalem market recordings (on "Eastern Mantra")

Technical

- Cabaret Voltaire – recording, production
- George Peckham – mastering
