= Red Mecca =

Studio album by Cabaret Voltaire
- Released: August 17, 1981
- Recorded: May 1981
- Studio: Western Works, Sheffield, England
- Genre: Industrial, post-punk
- Length: 40:11
- Label: Rough Trade
- Producer: Cabaret Voltaire

Cabaret Voltaire chronology
The Voice of America (1980)	Red Mecca (1981)	2X45 (1982)

Red Mecca is the fourth studio album by English industrial band Cabaret Voltaire, released in 17 August 1981 through Rough Trade Records.

== Background ==
While touring the United States in November 1979, Cabaret Voltaire became strongly interested in the rise of the Christian right in the country and its use of television, especially the fundraising broadcasts of televangelist Eugene Scott. They compared this phenomenon to the parallel rise of Islamism in the Middle East, devoting a side of vinyl to each strand of geopolitics on their 1980 album Three Mantras. Red Mecca was a culmination of this interest; the album further connects these themes to the bleak atmosphere of the deindustrialising North of England under Margaret Thatcher.

Band member Richard H. Kirk noted that the title was inspired by then-current events in the Middle East: "The whole Afghanistan situation was kicking off, Iran had the American hostages [...] it's not called [Red Mecca] by coincidence. We weren't referencing the fucking Mecca Ballroom in Nottingham!" According to Chris Watson, the band "wanted to use the word 'Mecca' in the title, and we wanted a strong word complimenting it, and came up with a colour – which happened to be Red. I mean, red is a strong colour anyway, but when they came together to make Red Mecca they took on a totally different significance."

Red Mecca was recorded at Western Works in Sheffield in May 1981.

== Release ==
Red Mecca reached No. 1 on the UK Independent Albums chart.

== Critical reception ==
Professional ratings
Review scores
Source	Rating
AllMusic	5/5 stars
Blender	4/5 stars
Muzik	5/5 stars
New Musical Express	7/10
Record Collector	4/5 stars
Record Mirror	2.5/5 stars
The Rolling Stone Album Guide	3.5/5 stars
Select	3/5
Spin Alternative Record Guide	9/10
Uncut	5/5 stars

NME named Red Mecca the ninth best album of 1981.

Andy Kellman of AllMusic retrospectively praised the album, writing, "Unlike a fair portion of [Cabaret Voltaire]'s studio output, Red Mecca features no failed experiments or anything that could be merely cast off as 'interesting.' It's a taut, dense, horrific slab lacking a lull." Uncut cited Red Mecca as the band's "masterpiece", where they "struck the perfect balance between experimentalism and entryism". Record Collector's Ian Shirley called it "a seismic release" and noted "its timeless sheen, with the Cabs' use of echo, space and phasing lending depth and vibrancy to the album."

In 2019, Pitchfork ranked Red Mecca as the fourth best industrial album of all time, deeming it a "paranoid, claustrophobic masterpiece".

== Track listing ==
All tracks are written by Cabaret Voltaire (Chris Watson, Richard H. Kirk, Stephen Mallinder), except "A Touch of Evil" and "A Touch of Evil (Reprise)" by Henry Mancini.

Side A
No.	Title	Length
1.	"A Touch of Evil"	3:11
2.	"Sly Doubt"	4:59
3.	"Landslide"	2:08
4.	"A Thousand Ways"	10:35

Side B
No.	Title	Length
1.	"Red Mask"	6:54
2.	"Split Second Feeling"	3:47
3.	"Black Mask"	3:19
4.	"Spread the Virus"	3:40
5.	"A Touch of Evil (Reprise)"	1:32

== Personnel ==
Cabaret Voltaire

- Christopher R. Watson – organ, tape, production, recording, sleeve design
- Richard H. Kirk – synthesizer, guitar, clarinet, horns, strings, production, recording, sleeve design
- Stephen Mallinder – vocals, bass guitar, bongos, production, recording, sleeve design

Additional personnel

- Nik Allday – drums
- Porky – mastering
- Neville Brody – sleeve design
