= Sensoria Music & Film Festival =

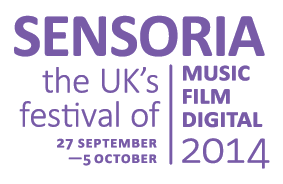
- 2014 campaign logo.
- Location: Sheffield, England
- Founded: 2008
- Hosted by: Sensoria Festival
- Festival date: 1 - 9 Oct 2021
- Language: International
- Website: http://www.sensoria.org.uk

Sensoria Music & Film Festival is the UK's festival of music, film and digital media. The festival based in Sheffield presents a unique mix of live performance, film screenings, installations, exhibitions and music industry activity. Sensoria’s first edition took place in April 2008 - since then attendances have grown enormously, reaching 12,000 in 2013 with 15,000 expected in 2014. They have welcomed guests including Bill Drummond, Jarvis Cocker, Nitin Sawhney, Richard Hawley, Mark Kermode, Mary Anne Hobbs, British Sea Power, Julien Temple, Laurie Anderson, James Dean Bradfield and more. The festival is renowned for its eclectic programme celebrating mavericks and pioneers, its use of unusual venues and for finding new ways of presenting, some examples include: drive-in cinemas, a screening in an outdoor pool in Hathersage and gigs in disused department stores.

Sensoria also runs the SensoriaPro Industry Day - an informal meeting point for professionals in music and film that has attracted multiple award-winning professionals from all over the world.

2018's edition welcomed Sensoria's most expansive programme to date, including BEAK>, the side-project of Portishead's Geoff Barrow, a Wes Anderson film weekend and the return of the 3 Ring Circus with Richard Hawley, Chris Difford and Graham Fellows.

== Festival patrons ==
- Nitin Sawhney
- Julien Temple
- Martyn Ware

== Festival guests ==
- Jarvis Cocker
- Mark Kermode
- Bill Drummond
- Mary Anne Hobbs
- Julien Temple
- Richard Hawley
- Feargal Sharkey
- Rob da Bank
- Laurie Anderson
- Geoff Barrow
- Chris Packham
- James Dean Bradfield

== Year-round activity ==
Sensoria hosts regular events throughout the year. These have included; • Screenings at In the City, Manchester • Resonator - educational music workshops. • Jail Guitar Doors film tour with Billy Bragg • Music Business Support Events • Devised and delivered Festivals Unit of the Creative Media Diplomas.
