= Virtual State =

Studio album by Richard H. Kirk
- Released: 1993
- Label: Warp
- Producer: Richard H. Kirk

Richard H. Kirk chronology
Ugly Spirit (1986)	Virtual State (1993)	The Number of Magic (1995)

Virtual State is Richard H. Kirk's first solo album for Warp Records.

== Critical response ==
The album was well received. In its review, Music Technology magazine said, "There is a dancey element, but it's a nod from an old master in the direction of progress rather than wholesale boogie."

XLR8R cited a connection to the emerging cyberpunk genre, saying, "This ten track album is state of the art trance and seems to be his tribute to Bruce Sterling and similar cyberpuppies and is for the most part excellent."

Kirk seemed to agree with this assessment, telling Mondo 2000, "My nightmare of the future is putting on one of those fucking headsets and being unable to get the fucking thing off. I don’t want to live in a world that’s not real. I’m finding the whole virtual reality thing to be getting a bit out of hand—that’s why I called my new album Virtual State."

== Track listing ==
1. "November X Ray Mexico" - 8:33
2. "Frequency Band" - 6:26
3. "Come" - 8:02
4. "Freezone" - 6:52
5. "Clandestine Transmission" - 6:36
6. "The Feeling (Of Warmth and Beauty)" - 6:08
7. "Velodrome" - 6:56
8. "Soul Catcher" - 7:08
9. "Worldwar Three" - 5:52
10. "Lagoon West" - 12:00

== Personnel ==
- Richard H. Kirk - all instruments
