= Micro-Phonies (album) =

Studio album by Cabaret Voltaire
- Released: 29 October 1984
- Recorded: February–May 1984
- Studio: Western Works, Sheffield
- Genre: Electro, industrial, synthpop, EBM
- Length: 42:34
- Label: Some Bizzare/Virgin
- Producer: Cabaret Voltaire and Flood

Cabaret Voltaire chronology
Johnny Yesno: The Original Soundtrack From the Motion Picture (1983)	Micro-Phonies (1984)	Drinking Gasoline (1985)

Singles from Micro-Phonies
- 1. "Sensoria" Released: October 1984; 2. "James Brown" Released: January 1985

Micro-Phonies is the sixth full-length studio album by British electronic band Cabaret Voltaire. Released 29 October 1984, the album was the group's most mainstream release to date, with the singles "Sensoria" and "James Brown" gaining popularity, especially the former, due to the music video finding MTV airplay.

The album sees Cabaret Voltaire continuing to change, pursuing the more electro and synthpop-oriented direction they had started shifting towards on The Crackdown.

== Production and release ==
It was co-produced with British engineer Flood.

The songs "Sensoria" and "Blue Heat" get alternative 12" mixes on the CD version of Micro-Phonies.

== Reception ==
Professional ratings
Review scores
Source	Rating
AllMusic	4/5 stars
The Encyclopedia of Popular Music	3/5 stars
The Rolling Stone Album Guide	3.5/5 stars
Sounds	4 5/6/5
Spin Alternative Record Guide	7/10

The Rolling Stone Album Guide gave Micro-Phonies a more positive review, compared to its predecessors in the discography and called the duo's "most exhilarating work", highlighting the improvement in Cabaret Voltaire's ability to "convert its interest in static structures into anything resembling conventional dance music", although with limited melody. The guide praised its accessibility paired with "menace" of their previous records, noticing a pop appeal in the songs "Do Right" and "Spies in the Wires", created through the chemistry between Stephen Mallinder's vocals and Richard H. Kirk's "churning electronics".

In AllMusic review, Ned Raggett favorably compared Micro-Phonies to the Cabaret Voltaire's previous discography, lauding its invention of "the shadowy, murkier side of industrial/noise experimentation". Raggett singled out the "funky, horn-heavy" song "James Brown", the "gripping" song "Sensoria", and brilliantly subtle "The Operative" as highlights. Raggett saw dub influences scattered throughout the album, in particular on "Digital Rasta". He also appreciated that Mallinder "submerges his vocals into the music rather than calling overt attention to them".

== Music video ==
The music video for "Sensoria" was directed by Peter Care, and attracted airplay on MTV. It was voted Best Video of the Year by the Los Angeles Times in 1985, and was later procured by the New York Museum of Modern Art.

== Legacy ==
A poster for the album is visible on Ferris Bueller's wall in the 1986 film Ferris Bueller's Day Off.

== Track listing ==
All tracks are written by Richard H. Kirk and Stephen Mallinder.

No.	Title	Length
1.	"Do Right"	6:44
2.	"The Operative"	3:14
3.	"Digital Rasta"	5:40
4.	"Spies in the Wires"	3:19
5.	"Theme from Earthshaker"	2:48
6.	"James Brown"	5:01
7.	"Slammer"	5:37
8.	"Blue Heat"	4:04
9.	"Sensoria"	6:19

Original CD issue bonus tracks
No.	Title	Length
10.	"Sensoria" (12" Mix)	7:52
11.	"Blue Heat" (12" Mix)	7:25

== Personnel ==
- Richard H. Kirk - synthesizers, programming, guitars
- Stephen Mallinder - vocals, bass
- Roger Quail - drums
- Mark Tattersall - percussion
- Eric Random - tablas
