= Groovy, Laidback and Nasty =

Studio album by Cabaret Voltaire
- Released: 2 April 1990
- Genre: House
- Length: 46:04
- Label: Parlophone
- Producer: Cabaret Voltaire; James Reynolds; Robert Gordon; Mark Brydon; Marshall Jefferson

Cabaret Voltaire chronology
Code (1987)	Groovy, Laidback and Nasty (1990)	Body and Soul (1991)

Singles from Groovy, Laidback and Nasty
- 1. "Hypnotised" Released: 1989; 2. "Keep On" Released: 1990; 3. "Easy Life" Released: 1990

Groovy, Laidback and Nasty is the ninth studio album by the English electronic band Cabaret Voltaire, released in April 1990 by record label Parlophone.

== Background and recording ==
Groovy, Laidback and Nasty was recorded in Chicago with veteran house producer Marshall Jefferson.

== Content ==
John Bush of AllMusic wrote that the album "sounds more groovy than nasty, as Mallinder's vocals sound much more pop-oriented than before", despite "possessing a somewhat dated feel even soon after its release".

== Reception ==
Professional ratings
Review scores
Source	Rating
AllMusic	3/5 stars
The Encyclopedia of Popular Music	3/5 stars
New Musical Express	8/10
The Rolling Stone Album Guide	3/5 stars
Select	4/5 stars
Spin Alternative Record Guide	3/10

Groovy, Laidback and Nasty was described as "triumphant" in Peter Buckley's compilation of rock music reviews, The Rough Guide to Rock.

== Track listing ==
All tracks composed by Richard H. Kirk and Stephen Mallinder, except where indicated.

1. "Searchin'" (Kirk, Mallinder, Marshall Jefferson) – 5:47
2. "Hypnotised" – 5:45
3. "Minute by Minute" – 5:07
4. "Runaway" – 6:38
5. "Keep On (I Got This Feeling)" – 6:12
6. "Magic" (Kirk, Mallinder, Marshall Jefferson) – 5:08
7. "Time Beats" – 4:55
8. "Easy Life" – 6:12
9. "Rescue Me (City Lights)" – 4:35 (included only on CD and cassette formats)

== Personnel ==
Cabaret Voltaire

- Stephen Mallinder – vocals, keyboards, programming
- Richard H. Kirk – keyboards, programming

Additional personnel

- David Josias – percussion on "Searchin'"
- Glenn Morimoto – trumpet on "Searchin'"
- Paris Brightledge, Bob Bono (Robert Bond) – vocals on "Searchin'" and "Minute by Minute"
- Marshall Jefferson – vocals on "Minute By Minute"
- Ten City – vocals on "Hypnotised" and "Runaway"
- Herb Lawson – guitar on "Runaway"
- Steel – rap on "Runaway"
- Lorita Grahame – vocals on "Keep On (I Got This Feeling)" and "Time Beats"
- Deborah Haslam – vocals on "Time Beats"
