= Drinking Gasoline =

EP by Cabaret Voltaire
- Released: April 1985
- Recorded: December 1984 – January 1985
- Studio: Western Works, Sheffield
- Genre: Electronic, experimental, industrial
- Length: 33:04
- Label: Some Bizzare; Distributed by Virgin
- Producer: Cabaret Voltaire

Cabaret Voltaire chronology
Micro-Phonies (1984)	Drinking Gasoline (1985)	The Covenant, the Sword, and the Arm of the Lord (1985)

Professional ratings
Review scores
Source	Rating
Allmusic	2.5/5 stars
The Encyclopedia of Popular Music	3/5 stars
The Rolling Stone Album Guide	3.5/5 stars
Spin Alternative Record Guide	8/10

Drinking Gasoline is a 1985 EP release (taking the form of two 12" singles) by Cabaret Voltaire, originally released on the Some Bizzare label and distributed through Virgin Records. All four tracks are featured on the band's "Gasoline in Your Eye" videocassette, also issued in 1985. All known copies of the original UK pressing had labels on the wrong discs (ie, side 1 label on side 3, side 2 label on side 4.) It peaked at #71 in the UK.

== Reception ==
John Leland at Spin called it, "living proof that technology is best entrusted to people who don't know how to use it. Sequencers and drum computers set a simple staccato cadence that the duo uses to carry its fragmented messages. Weird noises and voices cut in and out, irritating your peripheral senses while the hyperkinetic beatbox assaults your central nervous system with its idiot pounding." Andy Hurt of Sounds said "the men of steel say in 33 minutes what they once would have state in a tenth of the time. Disllusioning."

== Track listing ==
All songs were written by Richard H. Kirk and Stephen Mallinder.

Disc one, side one
No.	Title	Length
1.	"Kino"	8:28

Disc one, side two
No.	Title	Length
1.	"Sleepwalking"	8:27

Disc two, side one
No.	Title	Length
1.	"Big Funk"	8:10

Disc two, side two
No.	Title	Length
1.	"Ghostalk"	7:59

== Personnel ==
Cabaret Voltaire

- Stephen Mallinder – vocals, bass, production
- Richard H. Kirk – guitars, keyboards, production

Other personnel

- Mark Tattersall – drums on "Kino" and "Sleepwalking"
- Paul White – artwork
