= The Crackdown =

Studio album by Cabaret Voltaire
- Released: 18 August 1983
- Recorded: December 1982
- Studios: Trident Studios, London, England
- Genres: Electro-punk; post-punk; industrial
- Length: 43:33
- Labels: Some Bizzare; Virgin
- Producers: Cabaret Voltaire; Flood

Cabaret Voltaire chronology
Hai! (Live in Japan) (1982)	The Crackdown (1983)	Johnny Yesno: The Original Soundtrack From the Motion Picture (1983)

Singles from The Crackdown
- 1. "Just Fascination" Released: 1983

The Crackdown is the sixth studio album by English electronic band Cabaret Voltaire, released in August 1983 jointly through record labels Some Bizzare and Virgin. It was produced by the band themselves and Flood. Mixing their earlier experimental sound with more conventional dance rhythms, the album received positive reviews and was listed on NME's "Albums of the Year" in 1983.

== Background and recording ==
The Crackdown was Cabaret Voltaire's first full studio album following founding member Chris Watson's departure, and their first release for Virgin Records via Some Bizzare. This album marks a turning point in the band's discography, straddling their early experimental work with their later more conventional electronic dance-funk output. It was recorded and mixed at Trident Studios, London, England in late 1982.

AllMusic wrote that the album "features the band working a number of menacing electronic textures into a basic dance/funk rhythm".

== Reception ==
Professional ratings
Review scores
Source	Rating
AllMusic	4.5/5 stars
The Encyclopedia of Popular Music	3/5 stars
Record Mirror	5/5 stars
The Rolling Stone Album Guide	2.5/5 stars
Smash Hits	8/10
Sounds	5/5 stars
Spin Alternative Record Guide	8/10

Upon its release, the album was given an 8 out of 10 rating by Smash Hits reviewer Peter Martin who wrote that The Crackdown put the band's earlier experimental sound into practice: "Dense, hard-edged sequencer pulsebeats now swamp a strange strangled voice. The sound is panic-stricken and the effect is hypnotic."

It was ranked at number 11 in NME's "Albums of the Year" list for 1983. Trouser Press, meanwhile, was less enthusiastic, accusing the album of being "rather staid-sounding" while clarifying that their indifference "shouldn't be taken as a blanket panning."

Retrospectively, The Quietus reviewer Albert Freeman wrote: "The production is noticeably cleaner than their underfinanced independent recordings, but it’s hardly less dark, and the added clarity serves to show off the diverse, layered productions, which draw equally from dub, funk, and early electro. Mallinder’s vocals are easier to cipher than they had been before, but the pop tones they would later take on are evident on a few tracks from the album: the title track, ‘Taking Time’, ‘Animation’ and the cynically comical ‘Why Kill Time (When You Can Kill Yourself)’."

AllMusic described The Crackdown as "one of Cabaret Voltaire's strongest albums" and "one of their most distinctive, challenging records."

== Track listing ==
All tracks are written by Richard H. Kirk and Stephen Mallinder.

Side A
No.	Title	Length
1.	"24-24"	5:55
2.	"In the Shadows"	4:36
3.	"Talking Time"	5:25
4.	"Animation"	5:33

Side B
No.	Title	Length
1.	"Over and Over"	4:30
2.	"Just Fascination"	4:04
3.	"Why Kill Time (When You Can Kill Yourself)"	3:56
4.	"Haiti"	3:20
5.	"Crackdown"	6:31

Bonus 12": Doublevision EP
No.	Title	Length
1.	"Diskono"	5:49
2.	"Double Vision"	4:15
3.	"Moscow"	5:28
4.	"Badge of Evil"	4:53

Note: Some discographies and CD releases of the album swap the titles of the last two tracks of the Doublevision EP.

== Release ==
The original LP came with a bonus 12" of four tracks, comprising the EP Doublevision.

== Personnel ==
=== Cabaret Voltaire ===
- Stephen Mallinder – vocals, bass guitar, trumpet, grand piano
- Richard H. Kirk – synthesiser, guitar, clarinet, saxophone, & shakuhachi (Japanese bamboo flute), grand piano
- Alan Fish – drums, percussion

=== Additional personnel ===
- David Ball – keyboards and drum programming

== Production ==
- Executive Producer: Stevo Pearce (for Some Bizzare)
- Arranged by Cabaret Voltaire
- Produced by Flood and Cabaret Voltaire
- Engineered and mixed by Flood
- Tape Operation on "Animation" and "Crackdown" by David Ball
- Single remix by John Luongo
- Mastered by George Peckham
- Sleeve Typography by Ken Prust and Neville Brody
- Sleeve Illustration by Phil Barnes
