= The Voice of America (album) =

Studio album by Cabaret Voltaire
- Released: July 1980
- Recorded: March–April 1980
- Studio: Western Works, Sheffield, England
- Genre: Industrial, experimental, post-punk
- Label: Rough Trade
- Producer: Cabaret Voltaire

Cabaret Voltaire chronology
Three Mantras (1980)	The Voice of America (1980)	Red Mecca (1981)

The Voice of America is the third studio album by English band Cabaret Voltaire. It was released in July 1980, through record label Rough Trade.

== Critical reception ==
Professional ratings
Review scores
Source	Rating
AllMusic	3/5 stars
The Encyclopedia of Popular Music	2/5 stars
Muzik	4/5 stars
New Musical Express	6/10
Record Mirror	4.5/5 stars
The Rolling Stone Album Guide	2/5 stars
Select	2/5
Sounds	4/5 stars
Spin Alternative Record Guide	8/10
Uncut	4/5 stars

Trouser Press wrote that "the new material shows much greater focus and cleaner production than the older, with the mantra technique rising in place of the former chaotic electro-noise." AllMusic called it "not as spectacular as what would follow, but not without its own set of thrills."

SF Weekly wrote that "the music keeps moving outward, emitting boomerang-like signals that are only coming back to us today: The Moog-y skronk of 'Partially Submerged', part Krautrock and part free-jazz, anticipates Cologne's unfettered improv glitches, Radiohead's sprawling rock, and Aphex Twin's Dramamine ambiance."

== Track listing ==
All tracks are written by Richard H. Kirk, Stephen Mallinder, Chris Watson

Side A
No.	Title	Length
1.	"The Voice of America/Damage Is Done"	6:16
2.	"Partially Submerged"	3:45
3.	"Kneel to the Boss"	3:52
4.	"Premonition"	5:03

Side B
No.	Title	Length
1.	"This Is Entertainment"	5:51
2.	"If the Shadows Could March? (1974)"	0:55
3.	"Stay Out of It"	2:38
4.	"Obsession"	5:06
5.	"News from Nowhere"	2:21
6.	"Messages Received"	3:16

== Samples ==
"Stay Out Of It" samples three phrases from the Outer Limits episode "Demon with a Glass Hand": "the third part of your brain... you know where it is?", "don't kill me, please... please..." and "the hand... tell me what to do".

The opening of the album is taken from newsreel footage of policemen being given instructions how to cope with Beatles fans before a Beatles concert in 1966.

== Personnel ==
Cabaret Voltaire

- Richard H. Kirk – guitar, wind instruments
- Stephen Mallinder – vocals, bass guitar, electronic percussion
- Chris Watson – synthesizers, tapes
- Haydn Boyes Weston – drums

Technical

- Cabaret Voltaire – recording, production
- Porky – mastering

== Trivia ==
The run-out area etchings on side one include the question "WHERE IS THE THIRD MANTRA?" which is a reference to their earlier release Three Mantras.
