= The Covenant, the Sword, and the Arm of the Lord (album) =

Studio album by Cabaret Voltaire
- Released: 14 October 1985
- Genre: New wave, synthpop, EBM
- Length: 45:07 (original LP release)
- Label: Virgin, Caroline Records
- Producer: Cabaret Voltaire

Cabaret Voltaire chronology
Drinking Gasoline (1985)	The Covenant, the Sword, and the Arm of the Lord (1985)	Code (1987)

Professional ratings
Review scores
Source	Rating
AllMusic	3/5 stars
Encyclopedia of Popular Music	3/5 stars
The Great Rock Discography	6/10
MusicHound	4/5
Record Mirror	3.5/5 stars
The Rolling Stone Album Guide	3.5/5 stars
Spin Alternative Record Guide	7/10

The Covenant, the Sword and the Arm of the Lord is the seventh full-length studio album by the electronic band Cabaret Voltaire. The album was released through Some Bizzare Records in November 1985. The album's title was shortened to The Arm of the Lord for the United States.

== Background ==
Cabaret Voltaire struggled with several censorship issues with Some Bizarre and Virgin Records upon the release of the album. The original title, The Covenant, the Sword, and the Arm of the Lord, was forced to be shortened in the US to avoid reference to a former American white supremacist organisation. Musically, the album featured a more abrasive, sample-heavy sound than its predecessor and contained many sexual innuendos in the lyrics, to which Virgin Records took objection. Several speeches by Charles Manson were also mixed in between songs. Cabaret Voltaire were warned by their record label to produce a charting single or risk being dropped, so the group subversively released a music video for the track "I Want You", which Richard H. Kirk later admitted was about masturbation.

The album peaked at #57 in the UK, securing Cabaret Voltaire's future with the label. However the group switched to EMI for the release of Code, their 1987 follow-up album.

== Track listing ==
1. "L21ST" – 5:33
2. "I Want You" – 4:40
3. "Hells Home" – 5:10
4. "Kickback" – 5:37
5. "The Arm of the Lord" – 1:44
6. "Warm" – 3:21
7. "Golden Halos" – 5:13
8. "Motion Rotation" – 4:03
9. "Whip Blow" – 4:57
10. "The Web" – 4:49
11. "Sleepwalking" – 8:24
12. "Big Funk" – 8:09

11 and 12 are CD bonus tracks from the Drinking Gasoline EP.

== Personnel ==
Cabaret Voltaire

- Stephen Mallinder – vocals, bass, keyboards
- Richard H. Kirk – guitars, keyboards, tapes
