= Code (album) =

Studio album by Cabaret Voltaire
- Released: 5 October 1987
- Studio: Western Works (Sheffield)
- Genre: Synth-pop; electronic; industrial rock
- Length: 40:16; 48:24 (UK CD issue)
- Label: EMI
- Producer: Cabaret Voltaire; Adrian Sherwood

Cabaret Voltaire chronology
The Covenant, the Sword, and the Arm of the Lord (1985)	Code (1987)	Groovy, Laidback and Nasty (1990)

Singles from Code
- 1. "Don't Argue" Released: 1987; 2. "Here to Go" Released: 1987

Code (stylized as C O D E) is the eighth studio album by the English electronic band Cabaret Voltaire, released in October 1987 by EMI Records.

While the album itself failed to chart, it featured two songs that charted on the UK singles chart, with "Don't Argue" peaking at No. 69, and "Here to Go" peaking at No. 88.

== Content ==
The lyrics and title of "Don't Argue" incorporate verbatim a number of sentences from the narration of the short film Your Job in Germany (1945), directed by the Italian-American film director Frank Capra. The film was aimed at American soldiers occupying Germany and strongly warned against trusting or fraternizing with German citizens.

== Critical reception ==
Professional ratings
Review scores
Source	Rating
AllMusic	4/5 stars
The Encyclopedia of Popular Music	4/5 stars
Record Mirror	2.5/5 stars
The Rolling Stone Album Guide	4/5 stars
Spin Alternative Record Guide	5/10

AllMusic wrote that Code "finds Cabaret Voltaire at their loosest and most accessible", calling it "the closest thing CV ever made to a party record" and adding that it "[achieves] a genuine mechanistic funkiness reminiscent of late-'70s Kraftwerk". J. D. Considine, writing in Musician, contrasted Code with Kraftwerk's "elegant electronics," claiming that "Cabaret Voltaire processes sound the way a mainframe crunches numbers" before backing up to say: "cybernetic as the Cabs' sound may be, their sensibility is surprisingly pop."

Rolling Stone wrote that Code "finds the ideal balance between accessibility and menace", calling it "perhaps the duo's most exhilirating work".

== Track listing ==
1. "Don't Argue" – 4:26
2. "Sex, Money, Freaks" – 4:57
3. "Thank You America" – 5:22
4. "Here to Go" – 5:09
5. "Trouble (Won't Stop)" – 5:07
6. "White Car" – 2:44
7. "No One Here" – 5:00
8. "Life Slips By" – 3:26
9. "Code" – 4:07

Bonus tracks on UK CD issue

10. "Hey Hey" – 3:58
11. "Here to Go (Little Dub)" – 4:10

== Personnel ==
Cabaret Voltaire

- Stephen Mallinder – vocals; bass guitar; keyboards
- Richard H. Kirk – guitars; keyboards; computer-generated instrumentation

with:

- Bill Nelson – guitars on "Don't Argue", "Here to Go", "Trouble (Won't Stop)", "White Car" and "No One Here"
- Mark Brydon – bass guitar on "Sex, Money, Freaks" and "No One Here"
- Simeon Lister – saxophone on "Sex, Money, Freaks" and "No One Here"
- Adrian Sherwood – production, also remixed a separately-released version of "Here to Go"
