= Richard H. Kirk =

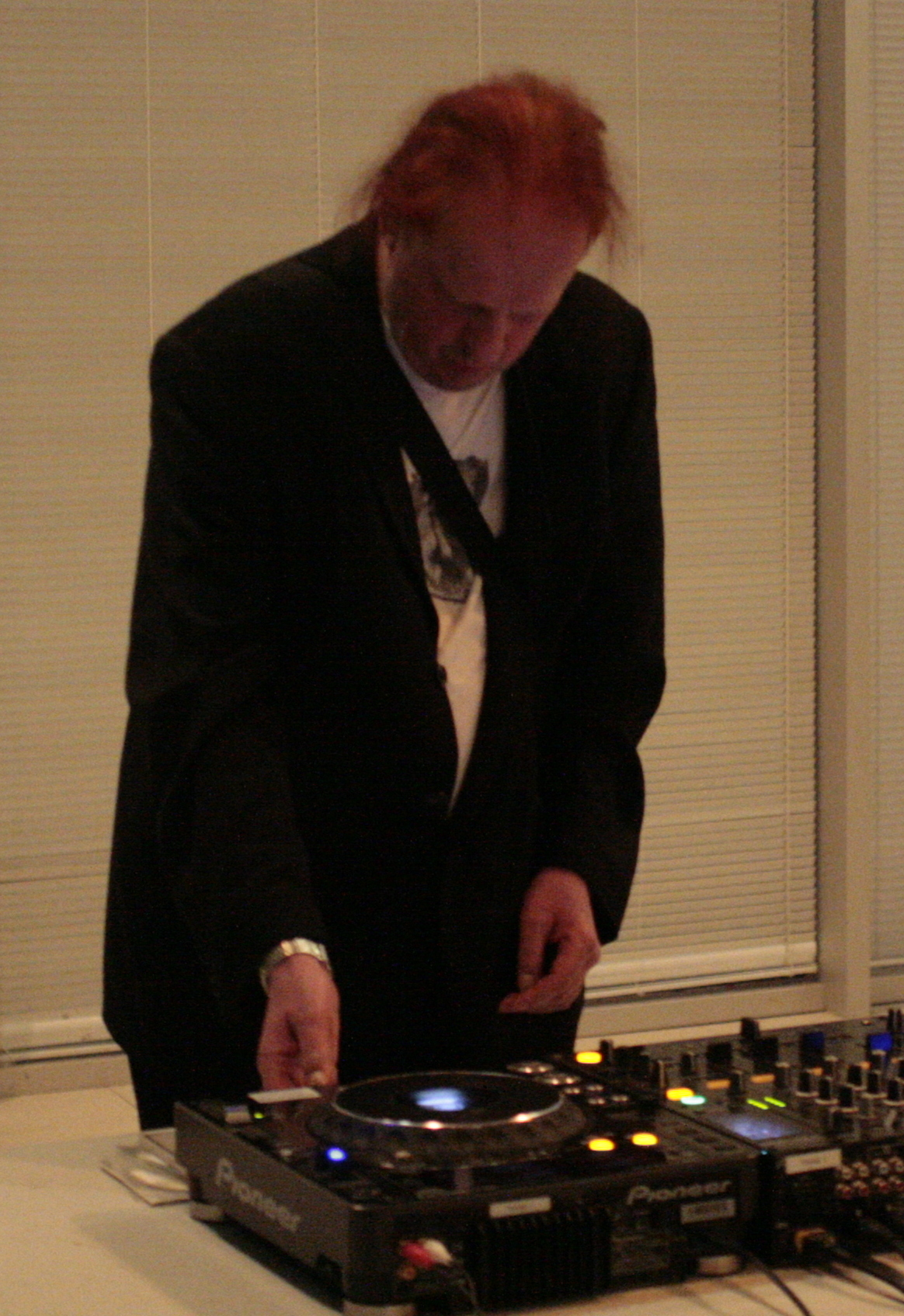
- Richard H. Kirk performing as DJ at Music for Real Airports event in Sheffield (2010)

Background information
- Also known as: Electronic Eye, Sandoz, Trafficante
- Born: Richard Harold Kirk; 21 March 1956
- Origin: Sheffield, Yorkshire, England
- Died: 21 September 2021 (aged 65)
- Genres: Electronic; industrial; techno
- Occupations: Composer; producer; musician
- Instruments: Sampler; keyboards; guitar; saxophone; clarinet
- Years active: 1973–2021
- Labels: Industrial; Doublevision; Rough Trade; Warp; Touch; Beyond; Alphaphone; Blast First; Intone; Mute; EMI
- Formerly of: Cabaret Voltaire; Sweet Exorcist
- Spouse: Lynne Clark

Richard Harold Kirk (21 March 1956 – 21 September 2021) was an English composer, musician and producer. He is best known for his work in electronic music, and for co-founding the influential music group Cabaret Voltaire in 1973 with Chris Watson and Stephen Mallinder.

Outside of Cabaret Voltaire, he was part of bands such as Sweet Exorcist and Acid Horse, and collaborated with bands and artists such as Peter Hope and Kora.

As a solo artist, Kirk released music under his own name as well as under dozens of aliases. His prolific solo work explored various genres, including dub, techno, ambient, electro, industrial and acid house.

== Biography ==
=== Early Life (1956-1973) ===
Kirk was born on March 21, 1956, and grew up in Sheffield, in South Yorkshire, England, where he would live his whole life. He attended the Psalter Lane School Of Art, where he completed a one-year course in sculpture and met Peter Care, who would later direct several Cabaret Voltaire videos.

=== Cabaret Voltaire (1973-1994) ===
Kirk, along with Chris Watson, formed the industrial band Cabaret Voltaire in 1973. Later that year, the band brought in Stephen Mallinder, to provide bass and vocals. Of the band's early era, Kirk said: "We'd do mad stuff - drive around in a van with tape loops playing out the back, or go into pubs with a tape machine and play weird stuff. Just trying to wind people up."

"When we started, we wanted to do something with sound, but none of us knew how to play an instrument," Kirk told the New York Times. "So we started using tape recorders and various pieces of junk and gradually learned to play instruments like guitars and bass."

Cabaret Voltaire signed to Rough Trade and released Extended Play, their debut EP, in November of that year. From 1978 to 1981, they would release the highly influential single "Nag Nag Nag" and the albums Mix-Up, The Voice of America and Red Mecca. Disposable Half-Truths, Kirk's solo debut, was recorded at Western Works Studio and released in 1980 by Industrial Records.

Watson left the band in 1981, though he still was featured on the 1982 album 2x45. His departure led Kirk and Mallinder towards a more commercial direction. Signing to Some Bizarre, and utilising a licencing deal with Virgin, the band released The Crackdown, Micro-Phonies and The Covenant, the Sword, and The Arm of The Lord. During this time, Kirk's second album Time High Fiction was released, though it featured material recorded as early as 1979.

Kirk began a collaboration with vocalist and musician Peter Hope, releasing singles such as "Leather Hands". He released two albums, Black Jesus Voice and Ugly Spirit. In 1987, Cabaret Voltaire released CODE via EMI, which Kirk followed with a culmination of Kirk's collaboration with Peter Hope, the album Hoodoo Talk.

Groovy, Laidback and Nasty, significantly influenced by house music, was the next album released by the band. Due to significant debt amassed under EMI, they were dropped. To release their next album, 1991's Body and Soul, the band returned to Les Disques du Crépuscule, a Belgian label who had previously released their second EP, 1981's 3 Crépuscule Tracks.

During this era, Kirk formed Sweet Exorcist, a seminal bleep techno act, with Richard Barratt. They released several singles, most notably "Testone", and an album, C.C.C.D, notable for being the first album released on the Warp Records label.

In 1991, the band made a deal with Mute, to distribute records from the band's label Plastex in the United States. From this period to 1994, the band released Plasticity, International Language and The Conversation. It is also around this time when Kirk began using some of his most well known aliases. His alias Sandoz released the single "Limbo" in 1992, and Digital Lifeforms in 1993, which was followed by the album Intensely Radioactive. As Electronic Eye he released Closed Circuit, and under his own name he released Virtual State. Cabaret Voltaire disbanded in 1994, and Mallinder moved to Australia in 1995.

=== After Cabaret Voltaire (1994-2009) ===
After Cabaret Voltaire's dissolution, Kirk continued to work prolificly, often prioritising aliases over work under his own name and exploring multiple types of electronic/dance music.

With Barratt, he released the second Sweet Exorcist album, Spirit Guide to Low Tech, this time under Touch.

Under his own name he released The Number of Magic, and in the same year released Every Man Got Dreaming as Sandoz and The Idea of Justice as Electronic Eye. After this Dark Continent was released under the Sandoz name, and he released a self-titled album under the project name Agents With False Memories.

In 1997 he released Intoxica and Night Watchmen under the aliases Nitrogen and Dark Magus respectively, and the fifth Sandoz release God Bless the Conspiracy. Experimenting with dub, which had heavily influenced his career, Kirk released In Dub: Chant to Jah.

He proceeded to release Knowledge Through Science as Richard H. Kirk, Is This Now? as Trafficante and one million and three as Al Jabr. From 1998 to 2001, Kirk released Darkness at Noon and LoopStatic (Amine ß Ring Modulations) under his own name, Afrocentris under Sandoz, Neurometrik under Electronic Eye, Subduing Demons in South Yorkshire under Blacworld, Aural Illusions under Digital Terrestrial and Here and Elsewhere under Orchestra Terrestrial.

After 9/11, much of Kirk's work shifted to critique of the war on terror, as he released albums such as TWAT v4.0: The War Against Terror and Bush Doctrine (under the alias Biochemical Dread). During this time, many of Kirk's unreleased recordings were put into compilations, such as URP Vol 1_ , URP Vol 2_ , URP Vol 3_ and URP VOL4 expreso_elektro_congo, along with Earlier/Later—Unreleased Projects Anthology '74–'89.

In the mid-2000s, Kirk released Richard H. Kirk Meets the Truck Bombers of Suburbia Uptown Vol. 1 (Feat. Pat Riot), Live in the Earth: Sandoz in Dub Chapter 2, Afro Digital under the Bit Crackle name, Subduing Demons in South Yorkshire Part 2 and the final Electronic Eye album Autoshark.

Later in the decade, two parts of the album Burning the Word by the alias Vasco De Mento were released, along with Sandoz In Dub: Chapter Two / Extra Time Under The Stones and Acid Editions (303 Excursions) under the Sandoz name, Sonic Reflections (Unreleased Soundtrack Project 1994) under his own and Unabriged Soundtrack To Future Movie as Dollars and Cents.

Kirk released much of this music on his own labels, including Alphaphone Recordings and Intone Records.

=== Cabaret Voltaire revival (2009-2021) ===
In 2009, Kirk revived the Cabaret Voltaire moniker as a solo project, to release remix albums with Kora and The Tivoli, titled Kora! Kora! Kora! and National Service Rewind respectively. Kirk followed this with two albums under his own name, Reality Is Opposite and Anonymised, and his final album as Sandoz, Digital Life Time.

Kirk played the first Cabaret Voltaire gig in twenty years in 2014, at Berlin Atonal, with all new material. According to Kirk, Coachella offered him a significant amount of money to reunite the original membership of Kirk, Watson and Mallinder. Of this, he said, "Cabaret Voltaire was always about breaking new ground and moving forward. It would be so sad to see it as a nostalgia act. You can't make yourself that age again. The way forward is to keep trying new things."

Kirk's final album under his own name, Dasein was released in 2017. It received critical acclaim from The Quietus, who described it as "the most ambitious and complex album Richard H. Kirk has created in his solo career."

Under the Cabaret Voltaire name, Kirk released Shadow of Fear, with "Vasto" as the lead single. In the next few months, Kirk released an EP titled Shadow of Funk, along with two drone albums, Dekadrone and BN9Drone, all under the Cabaret Voltaire moniker. These were his final releases, as he died on 21 September 2021, aged 65.

His prolific work resulted in AllMusic calling him "contemporary techno's busiest man".

== Aliases ==
In addition to solo releases under his own name, Kirk used the following aliases:

- Agents with False Memories
- Al Jabr
- Anarchia
- Biochemical Dread
- Blacworld
- Chemical Agent
- Citrus
- Cold Warrior
- Countzero
- Dark Magus
- Destructive Impact
- DR Xavier
- Electronic Eye
- Extended Family
- Frightgod
- Future Cop Movies
- Harold Sandoz
- International Organisation
- King of Kings
- Multiple Transmission
- Nine Miles Dub
- Nitrogen
- Orchestra Terrestrial
- Outland Assassin
- Papadoctrine
- Pat Riot
- Port-au-Prince
- PSI Punky Dread Allstars
- Reflexiv
- The Revolutionary Army
- Robots + Humanoids
- Sandoz
- Signals Intelligence
- The Silent Age
- Trafficante
- Ubermenschlich
- Ubu Rahmen
- Wicky Wacky
- Vasco de Mento

== Collaborations ==
The following is a list of groups and artists Kirk has worked with or been part of:

- Acid Horse
- Cabaret Voltaire
- Citrus
- Kora
- Peter Hope
- The Pressure Company
- Sweet Exorcist
- The Tivoli
- XON

== Incomplete discography ==
=== Albums ===
==== As Richard H. Kirk ====
- Disposable Half-Truths (1980)
- Time High Fiction (1983)
- Black Jesus Voice (1986)
- Ugly Spirit (1986)
- Hoodoo Talk (with Peter Hope) (1988)
- Virtual State (1993)
- The Number of Magic (1995)
- Knowledge Through Science (1998)
- Darkness At Noon (1999)
- LoopStatic (Amine ß Ring Modulations) (2000)
- TWAT v4.0: The War Against Terror (2003)
- Richard H. Kirk Meets the Truck Bombers of Suburbia Uptown Vol. 1 (Feat. Pat Riot) (2004)
- Sonic Reflections (Unreleased Soundtrack Project 1994) (2009)
- Reality Is Opposite (2011)
- Anonymized (2011)
- Dasein (2017)

==== As Sandoz ====
- Digital Lifeforms (1993)
- Intensely Radioactive (1994)
- Every Man Got Dreaming (1995)
- Dark Continent (1996)
- God Bless the Conspiracy (1997)
- In Dub: Chant to Jah (1998)
- Afrocentris (2001)
- Live in the Earth: Sandoz in Dub, Chapter 2 (2005)
- Sandoz In Dub: Chapter Two / Extra Time Under The Stones (2007)
- Acid Editions (303 Excursions) (2009)
- Digital Life Time (2012)

==== As Electronic Eye ====
- Closed Circuit (1994)
- The Idea of Justice (1995)
- Neurometrik (2000)
- Autoshark (2006)

==== Releases under other aliases ====
- Agents with False Memories (as Agents with False Memories) (1996)
- Intoxica (as Nitrogen) (1997)
- Night Watchmen (as Dark Magus) (1997)
- one million and three (as Al Jabr) (1998)
- Is This Now? (as Trafficante) (1998)
- Subduing Demons in South Yorkshire (as Blacworld) (2000)
- Aural Illusions (as Digital Terrestrial) (2001)
- Here and Elsewhere (as Orchestra Terrestrial) (2001)
- Bush Doctrine (as Biochemical Dread) (2003)
- Afro Digital (as Bit Crackle) (2005)
- Subduing Demons in South Yorkshire, Part 2 (as Blacworld) (2005)
- Burning the Words, Part One (as Vasco De Mento) (2007)
- Burning the Words, Part Two (as Vasco De Mento) (2007)
- Unabriged Soundtrack To Future Movie (as Dollars and Cents) (2009)
- Umladen (as Orchestra Terrestrial) (2011)

=== Singles and EPs ===
- "Leather Hands" (as Richard H. Kirk, with Peter Hope) (1985)
- "Hipnotic" (as Richard H. Kirk) (1986)
- "Surgeons / N.O." (as Richard H. Kirk, with Peter Hope) (1988)
- "Let's Get Down" (as Wicky Wacky) (1988)
- "Andrenachrome" (as Citrus) (1992)
- "Limbo" (as Sandoz) (1992)
- "Chocolate Machine" (as Sandoz) (1993)
- "Digital Lifeforms" (as Sandoz) (1993)
- "Earthloop" (as Multiple Transmission) (1995)
- "Shooting Stars" (as International Organisation) (1996)
- "Waterfall" (as Chemical Agent) (1996)
- "Scientific Exploitation" (as Sandoz) (2002)
- "King Dread" (as Sandoz) (2002)
- "Detonate / Reworks" (as Richard H. Kirk) (2004)
- "Return to the Heart of Darkness / Reworks" (as Sandoz) (2004)
- "Fear (No Evil)" (as Richard H. Kirk) (2006)
- "Neuroscience" (as Richard H. Kirk) (2009)
- "Holding On" (as Sandoz) (2012)

=== Compilations ===
- Step Write Run Alphaphone, Vol. 1 (1996)
- URP Vol 1_ (Various aliases) (2003)
- URP Vol 2_ (Various aliases) (2004)
- URP Vol 3_ (Various aliases) (2004)
- Earlier/Later—Unreleased Projects Anthology '74–'89 (as Richard H. Kirk) (2004)
- URP VOL4 expreso_elektro_congo (Various aliases) (2005)
- Entering Valhalla, Vol.1: With Bass, Drum and Electronic Sounds (Various aliases) (2006)
- Entering Valhalla, Vol.2: Virtual Lite (as Richard H. Kirk) (2006)
- #7489: Collected Works 1974-1989 (as Richard H. Kirk) (2016)
- #9294: Collected Works 1992–1994 (as Sandoz) (2016)
