= Chris Watson (musician) =

English musician and sound recordist (born 1953)

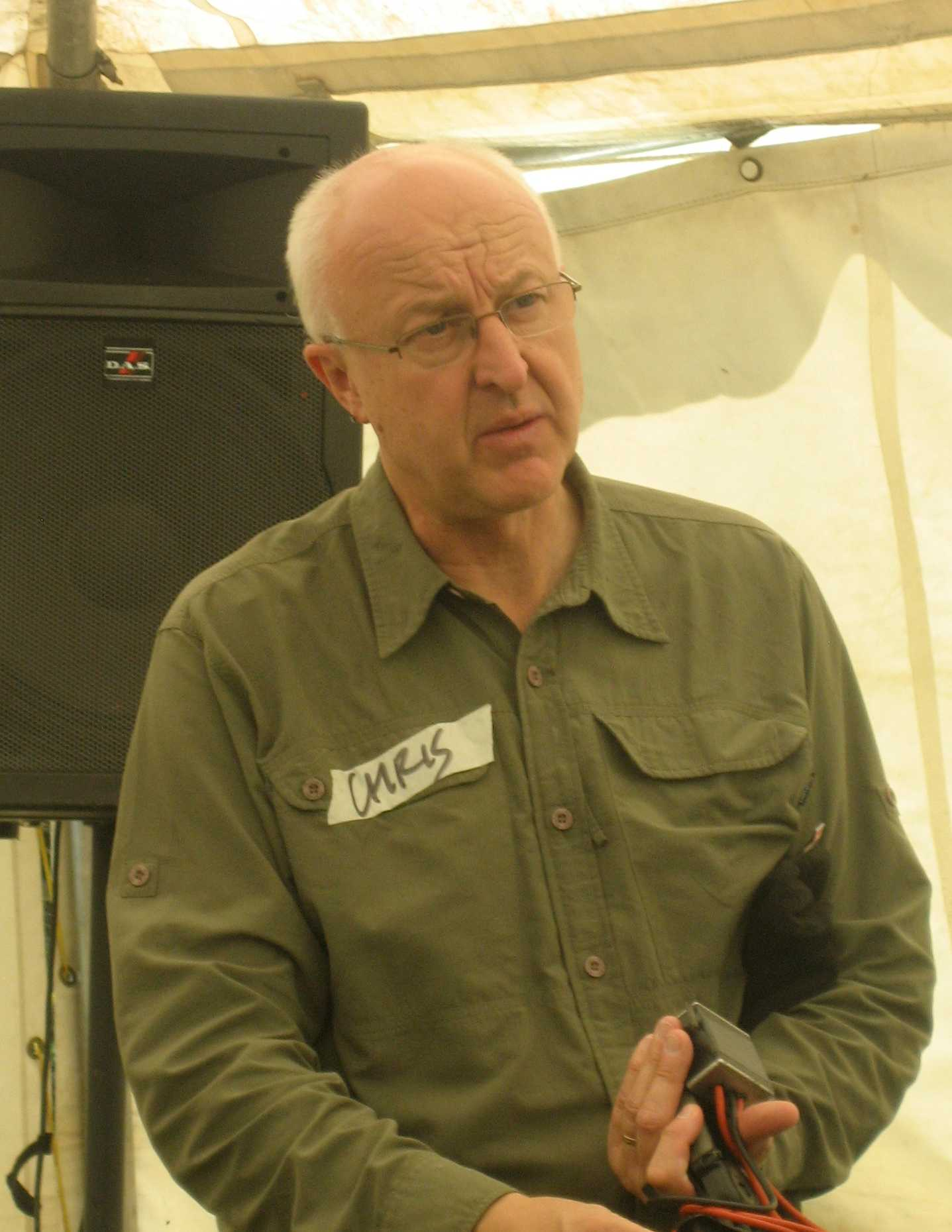
- Watson speaking at the 2009 WIRED Lab

Background information
- Born: 1953; Sheffield, Yorkshire, England
- Genres: Electronic; field recordings
- Instruments: Vocals, keyboards, sampler
- Labels: Touch, Rough Trade
- Formerly of: Cabaret Voltaire; The Hafler Trio

Christopher Richard Watson (born 21 November 1953) is an English musician and sound recordist. A founding member of the Sheffield-based industrial band Cabaret Voltaire, Watson's subsequent work in field recordings since 1981 has included television documentaries and experimental musical collaborations.

== Music ==
Watson was a founding member of Cabaret Voltaire, and later formed Hafler Trio.

He has released several solo albums of field recordings including: Outside the Circle of Fire, Stepping into the Dark (which won an Award of Distinction at the 2000 Prix Ars Electronica Festival in Linz, Austria), Weather Report, and El Tren Fantasma. He has also released a variety of works in collaboration with other artists, including Mika Vainio of Pan Sonic, Philip Jeck, Hazard, Fennesz, AER (Jon Wozencroft, a.k.a. "Alpha Echo Romeo"), Biosphere, BJNilsen, and Marcus Davidson. All of these recordings were released on Touch, which releases material digitally through Bandcamp.

His album Weather Report (2003) was named as one of the "1000 albums to hear before you die" by The Guardian in 2007.

== Sound recording ==
Watson's sound recording career began in 1981 when he left Cabaret Voltaire to join Tyne Tees Television. His television work includes Bill Oddie Back in the USA, Great Railway Journeys, Springwatch, and numerous nature documentaries by David Attenborough.

In 2006 he was awarded an honorary Doctor of Technology degree by the University of the West of England "in recognition of his outstanding contribution to sound recording technology, especially in the field of natural history and documentary location sound".

In 2010 he devised an art project at Liverpool's Alder Hey Children's Hospital, using sound recordings made by children to calm other young patients as they received injections and other treatments.

In 2018 he assisted Hildur Guðnadóttir in recording sounds from the Ignalina Nuclear Power Plant for her Grammy Award-winning score for the miniseries Chernobyl.

In 2024 he was sound designer for Andrea Luza Zimmerman's film Wayfaring Stranger.

Watson is the president of the Wildlife Sound Recording Society.

=== Radio programmes ===
Watson has made and been featured in a number of BBC radio programmes:

- The Reed Bed – Series of five, fifteen-minute radio programmes, broadcast on BBC Radio Four in March 2007
- A Guide to Garden Birds – Series of five, fifteen-minute radio programmes, broadcast weekly on Radio Four from May 2007
- A Guide to Farmland Birds – Series of five, fifteen-minute radio programmes, broadcast weekly on Radio Four from August 2011
- BBC Radio 4's biography series, Great Lives, in which he nominated the pioneering sound recordist Ludwig Koch.

== Personal life ==
Watson was raised in the Sheffield suburb of Totley and attended Rowlinson School and Stannington College (now part of Sheffield College), both in Sheffield. He is married to Maggie, who appeared momentarily on-screen with him in episode 3 of Autumnwatch 2010. Watson now lives in Northumberland.

Watson was a Policy & Enterprise Fellow at Durham University's Institute of Advanced Study from December 2012 to May 2013.

== Album discography ==
=== Solo ===
- Sunsets wordless recording made at Breachacha on Coll 1994
- Stepping into the Dark (1996, Touch)
- Outside the Circle of Fire (1998, Touch)
- Weather Report (2003, Touch)
- Cima Verde (2008, Fondazione Edmund Mach and LoL Productions)
- El Tren Fantasma (2011, Touch)
- In St Cuthbert's Time (2013, Touch)
- Planet Ocean (2026, Touch)

=== With Cabaret Voltaire ===
- Mix-Up (1979)
- Three Mantras (1980)
- The Voice of America (1980)
- Red Mecca (1981)
- 2x45 (1982)

=== Collaborations ===
- Star Switch On with Mika Vainio, Philip Jeck, Hazard, Fennesz, AER, and Biosphere (2002, Touch)
- Number One with KK Null and Z'EV (2005, Touch)
- Storm with BJ Nilsen (2006, Touch)
- Siren with Alec Finlay Platform Projects # ISBN 0-9546831-7-X [CD EP]
- Cross-Pollination (Chris Watson + Marcus Davidson album) (2011, Touch)
- Oxmardyke with Philip Jeck (2023, Touch)
