= International Language (album) =

Studio album by Cabaret Voltaire
- Released: 8 October 1993
- Recorded: Western Works Studios, Sheffield
- Genre: IDM, ambient techno
- Length: 75:06
- Label: Plastex
- Producer: Cabaret Voltaire

Cabaret Voltaire chronology
Plasticity (1992)	International Language (1993)	The Conversation (1994)

International Language is the twelfth studio album by English electronic band Cabaret Voltaire, released in October 1993 on the band's own label, Plastex.

== Content ==
AllMusic wrote that the album "tones down the Chicago house elements which had creeped into [Cabaret Voltaire's previous album] Plasticity, replacing them with sublime acid-electro, tribal elements on several tracks".

== Release ==
International Language was released on 8 October 1993 on the band's own label, Plastex.

== Reception ==
Professional ratings
Review scores
Source	Rating
AllMusic	4/5 stars
The Encyclopedia of Popular Music	3/5 stars
Spin Alternative Record Guide	7/10

AllMusic wrote that, while "the melodies and chord progressions sometimes verge on the obvious", and "the same emphasis on samples [...] occasionally distorts the value of the underlying music", the album is "a worthy addition to CV's mammoth discography".

== Track listing ==
All tracks composed by Richard H. Kirk and Stephen Mallinder.

1. "Everything Is True" - 10:50
2. "Radical Chic" - 6:50
3. "Taxi Mutant" - 10:06
4. "Let It Come Down" - 9:27
5. "Afterglow" - 8:00
6. "The Root" - 9:17
7. "Millenium" - 6:22
8. "Belly of the Beast (Back in Babylon)" - 8:15
9. "Other World" - 5:37
