= Cabaret Voltaire (band) =

English band

- Left to right: Richard H. Kirk, Stephen Mallinder, Chris Watson

Background information
- Origin: Sheffield, South Yorkshire, England
- Genres: Industrial; post-punk; EBM; electro; acid house; techno
- Years active: 1973–1994; 2009–2021; 2025–present
- Labels: Industrial; Rough Trade; Factory; Some Bizzare/Virgin; Parlophone/EMI Group; Mute; Les Disques du Crépuscule; Doublevision; Plastex; Instinct
- Spinoffs: Acid Horse; Hafler Trio; Sandoz; Sweet Exorcist
- Members: Stephen Mallinder; Chris Watson
- Past members: Richard H. Kirk

Cabaret Voltaire are an English music group formed in Sheffield in 1973 and initially composed of Stephen Mallinder, Richard H. Kirk, and Chris Watson. Named after the Zürich nightclub that fostered the early Dada movement, the band are often characterised as among the most innovative and influential electronic acts of their era.

The band's early work consisted of experimentation with DIY electronics and tape recorders, as well as Dada-influenced performance art, helping to pioneer industrial music in the mid-1970s. Finding an audience during the post-punk era, they gradually incorporated more conventional elements of synthpop, techno, house and funk styles. After Watson's departure in 1981, the group continued as a two-piece until disbanding in 1994. Kirk revived the name as a solo project from 2009 until his death in 2021.

Watson and Mallinder announced on 13 May 2025 they would be performing a 50th anniversary gig on 25 October 2025 as part of the Sensoria Festival in Sheffield.

== History ==
=== Formation ===
By the early 1970s, Chris Watson of Sheffield, England began experimenting with electronic devices to make "music without musical instruments." Inspired by Brian Eno of Roxy Music, and helped along by his work as a telephone engineer, Watson's experimentation with tape loops evolved to include custom-built kit oscillators obtained by mail order by the time he met fellow Sheffield local and Eno devotee Richard Kirk. Kirk and Watson began exploring the intersection of technology and music, producing tape loops to generate sound collages and unusual sound structures. Kirk began to add traditional instrumentation, including clarinet and guitar. In late 1973, they brought in Kirk's friend Stephen Mallinder to provide vocals and bass guitar. Some of these early experiments were first documented on the Industrial Records cassette 1974-1976 (1980), then later on the triple album CD set Methodology '74/'78: The Attic Tapes (Mute 2002).

The band eventually turned to live performance, often sharing the bill with Joy Division, though much of their earliest public performance tended more towards being unconventional and provocative stunts rather than conventional shows. The trio would deploy to various parts of Sheffield with their portable tape recorders and play their experimental compositions in places as diverse as public toilets and on the streets from loudspeakers on the top of a friend's van. This raucous and punkish attitude followed the band onstage to great effect; their first live concert in May 1975 ended in a fight between the band and the audience that sent Mallinder to hospital. In another incident, Mallinder was hospitalised with a chipped backbone after objects were thrown at the band. However, the arrival of punk rock brought a more accepting audience for their industrial, electronic sound and they were championed by Sheffield punk fanzine Gunrubber edited by Paul Bower of local band 2.3.

In 1977, Watson financed the establishment of the band's own recording studio on the second floor of a building called the Western Works on Portobello Street in Sheffield. The "Western Works" studio served as the band's studio for many years as well as providing a social gathering spot for the local Sheffield scene. Western Works produced some of the earliest recordings of pioneering local bands including Clock DVA, the Human League, and New Order.

=== Emergence: Mix-Up to Red Mecca (1979–1981) ===
In 1978, Cabaret Voltaire signed to Rough Trade Records. Manchester-based Factory Records had offered to sign the band, and Throbbing Gristle were also interested in signing the band to Industrial Records, but it was with an offer of a four-track Revox tape machine (in lieu of an advance) that Rough Trade secured the deal. With Rough Trade, they released several acclaimed, musically experimental singles and EPs, including Extended Play and "Nag Nag Nag", and albums such as Three Mantras and The Voice of America in 1980, and Red Mecca in 1981.

In the 27 June 1978 edition of NME, Andy Gill said "I firmly believe Cabaret Voltaire will turn out to be one of the most important new bands to achieve wider recognition this year. Wait and see". Subsequently, "Nag Nag Nag" sold 10,000 copies, despite poor reviews, and reached as far afield as France and Belgium, while the debut album Mix-Up reached number 12 on the UK Indie charts. Their success continued with The Voice of America and Red Mecca, reaching number three and number one on the UK Indie charts respectively.

=== Watson departs, Kirk and Mallinder continue (1981–1982) ===
Watson left the band in 1981 to work for Tyne Tees Television and went on to found The Hafler Trio with Andrew M. McKenzie before becoming a BBC sound engineer and then a soloist. On 25 June 1981, John Peel broadcast a session on the BBC, recorded previously by the band, which included four songs: "Black Mask", "Greensborough", "Walls of Jericho" and "Jazz the Glass".

During this time, Cabaret Voltaire toured Europe, Japan, and the United States without major record label support, releasing Hai!, a live album recorded in Japan, in 1982.

In late 1982, Cabaret Voltaire decided consciously to turn in a more commercial direction. Introduced by New Order to the American dance music producer John Robie, Cabaret Voltaire enlisted him to remix "Yashar", a track from their 1982 album 2x45. The 12-inch single was released by Factory Records in May 1983, and received extensive play in dance clubs.

=== The Virgin years: The Crackdown to The Covenant (1983–1985) ===
In 1983, Stevo Pearce signed the duo to his Some Bizzare label and leveraged a licensing deal with Virgin. The £50,000 advance from Some Bizzare allowed Kirk and Mallinder to significantly improve their operation at Western Works, but came with the stipulation of having to record their next LP in London and making certain production changes to their music. The relationship with Some Bizzare and Virgin resulted in greater exposure and promotion for the band. In August 1983, the album The Crackdown was released and reached number 31 in the UK Albums Chart – over 60 places higher than their previous (and, at the time, only) chart placement. The album's single for "Just Fascination" peaked at number 74.

In 1984, the singles "Sensoria" and "James Brown" from the album Micro-Phonies charted on the UK Indie Chart, as well as getting play in the underground dance scene. The 12" mix of "Sensoria", co-produced by John "Tokes" Potoker, was a vastly improved melding of two of the album's tracks, "Sensoria" and "Do Right". The video for the single was directed by Peter Care and earned significant air time and acclaim including a Los Angeles Times Best Video award for 1985.

1985 proved to be a busy year for the band with numerous releases as well as an American tour. Gasoline in your Eye was released that year, which was a compendium of singles videos along with prototype footage for the band's unfinished film "Earthshaker" and other band-filmed footage put to unreleased Cabaret Voltaire music. A double 12" release was derived from the video and released as Drinking Gasoline. The band rounded-out 1985 with a new album, The Covenant, The Sword and the Arm of the Lord and its single, "I Want You," which would be the last releases for the band on Virgin.

=== The EMI years begin: Code and an identity crisis (1986–1987) ===
By 1986, Virgin offered to extend Cabaret Voltaire's record contract, but EMI group signalled an intent to invest more in the group and the lure of increased resources through a major label proved irresistible. One of these resources was access to producer Adrian Sherwood, who produced 1987's Code and its singles "Don't Argue" and "Here to Go". Code also featured additional musicians including Bill Nelson on guitar and Mark Brydon on bass.

While 1987 proved to be a successful year musically, in other respects the band was faltering. The decision was made to abandon the original Western Works studio after a series of break-ins and the emergence of financial issues due to accounting problems from years before threatened to force a sale of their new studio. Additionally, Mallinder moved to London and took on more of a socialite lifestyle while Kirk remained in Sheffield. This formed a schism between the band members characterized by the extroverted Mallinder and the reluctant Kirk that was a mirror of the identity crisis of an experimental/unconventional band on the verge of going pop.

=== Solo excursions and house/techno era (1988–1994) ===
Prior to 1988, each member of Cabaret Voltaire had released several solo recordings under their own names, and Kirk had worked with Peter Hope of The Box on an album and single. The band's physical separation — with Kirk in Sheffield and Mallinder in London — and the burgeoning house and acid house movements opened new opportunities for solo collaborations. In 1988, Mallinder collaborated with Robert Gordon, co-founder of Warp Records, and David Ball of Soft Cell on a one-off house album under the name Love Street, and Kirk produced a solo acid house 12" as Wicky Wacky.

The band's interest in house music created new connections for the band in America. After trying in vain to contact New York producer Todd Terry, an introduction was made by an Atlantic Records executive to Chicago house producer Marshall Jefferson. The introduction led to a cross-Atlantic collaboration, with the members of Cabaret Voltaire spending a month in Chicago to produce material for their 1990 album Groovy, Laidback and Nasty. Marshall brought numerous guest artists into the album's production including Ten City and Kym Mazelle, and the lead single from the album — "Hypnotised" — featured remix talent from Fon Force (Mark Brydon and Robert Gordon), A Guy Called Gerald, and Daniel Miller.

Despite the newfound energy and direction, the band amassed significant debt under EMI and the label dropped Cabaret Voltaire from their roster. Released from the label, Kirk began a series of projects between 1990 and 1992, including Sweet Exorcist with Richard Barratt, The Technocrats with Ralf Dörper, XON with Robert Gordon, Citrus with Steve Cobby, and solo as Sandoz.

Cabaret Voltaire returned to Les Disques Du Crépuscule to release the Body and Soul album in 1991. The album featured a more minimal sound than Groovy, Laidback and Nasty and was the last Cabaret Voltaire release to feature Mallinder on vocals. In 1991, the band entered an agreement with Mute Records to release new and past works from the band's own Plastex label imprint in the US. Between 1992 and 1994, the band released a trio of instrumental works.

=== Parting ways and rumours of revival (1995–2009) ===
In 1995, Mallinder moved to Perth, Australia, and effectively left Cabaret Voltaire in order to step away from the commercial and financial pressures of what had become of his music career. Opting instead to make music with less emphasis on product, Mallinder set up his own music company in Perth, OffWorld Sounds, while he pursued an academic career. Eventually Mallinder returned to music collaboration with a number of projects including Sassi & Loco and Kuling-Bros. Mallinder also contributed to synthesizer and programming on Shaun Ryder's solo album Amateur Night at the Big Top.

Meanwhile, Kirk remained in England and continued in the vein of where Cabaret Voltaire left off through the remainder of the '90s and into the 2000s with more releases under his own name, as Sandoz, and as a new solo project, Electronic Eye.

Hopes of a Cabaret Voltaire reunion were raised when Kirk dropped hints in the late 1990s, the most significant being in the notes of a reissue of Radiation, but this never happened. In a special 'Depeche Mode/History of Electro-pop' edition of Q magazine, Kirk suggested he was still considering resurrecting the Cabaret name, but this time he planned to "Get some young people involved".

=== Kirk revives the band (2009–2021) ===
In 2009, Kirk resurrected the Cabaret Voltaire name and released an album with New Zealand band Kora called Kora! Kora! Kora! and another with Sheffield band The Tivoli called National Service Rewind. The new material was recorded at Western Works studios.

In July 2014, Berlin Atonal reported that Cabaret Voltaire were to perform at the festival. The performance – the first in twenty years – saw a set list of all new material performed by a line-up "consisting solely of machines, multi-screen projections and Richard H. Kirk", the lone remaining member of the 'group'.

In September 2015, Cabaret Voltaire performed a set of new music at the Incubate Festival in Tilburg, the Netherlands. It was a seated show with visuals.

In early August 2016, Cabaret Voltaire performed an hour long set of otherwise unreleased material at the Dekmantel festival in Amsterdam, the Netherlands.

Circa 2017, the Coachella Festival made a significant offer to Kirk to reform the original Cabaret Voltaire for a reunion show. Kirk refused, stating that "Cabaret Voltaire was always about breaking new ground and moving forward. It would be so sad to see it as a nostalgia act."

In August 2020, Cabaret Voltaire announced a new studio album Shadow of Fear. Backed by the first single "Vasto," the album was released on 20 November 2020. These are the first strictly Cabaret Voltaire recordings with Richard H. Kirk as the group's sole member. These were followed in 2021 by the release of a new EP, Shadow of Funk, and two albums, Dekadrone and BN9Drone.

Richard Kirk died in September 2021 at the age of 65.

=== 50th anniversary reunion and final tour (2025–present) ===
On 13 May 2025, it was announced that Mallinder and Watson would be reuniting as Cabaret Voltaire to take part in the Sensoria Festival in Sheffield. The gig was arranged for 25 October 2025 at the FORGE Warehouse. On 28 October 2025, they announced their final UK tour, which will take place throughout October 2026. In February 2026, the band announced the release of a new live album taken from the tour and new tour dates.

In January 2026, Cabaret Voltaire announced a series of Final European dates through March and June, and a Final USA + Canada Tour beginning in May.

In October 2026, Floyd Live Music Venue in Athens, Greece, announced a concert to take place on 3rd December: "As part of their farewell tour, Stephen 'Mal' Mallinder and Chris Watson present a set that spans the entire history of Cabaret Voltaire, reconstructed from scratch using the technology and processes of the original recordings."

== Influences and legacy ==
Cabaret Voltaire have cited Kraftwerk, the Velvet Underground's The Velvet Underground & Nico and White Light/White Heat albums, Can and Neu! as influences.

New Order lead singer and guitarist, Bernard Sumner, said that Cabaret Voltaire influenced his songwriting, having helped him understand that one "could make music without guitars". In Alan Cross's 2012 biography of Skinny Puppy, Cabaret Voltaire's "industrial-grade thumping and noise terrorism" was cited as an influence on the band. In 2012, Trent Reznor stated that the Cabaret Voltaire was a major influence when working on his debut studio album with How to Destroy Angels. Others who have cited Cabaret Voltaire as an influence include Horrid Red, Fluke and Front Line Assembly. Depeche Mode's Martin Gore once listed Cabaret Voltaire among his favourite bands. David J of Bauhaus named the group as one of the "few bands on the [post-punk] scene at the time to whom we related".

As well as helping pioneer industrial music in the 1970s, Cabaret Voltaire have been considered influential on the industrial techno movement of the 1990s. Alain Jourgensen, while working with the band on the Acid Horse project, observed the irony of Cabaret Voltaire's turn towards house music circa 1989 as closing the circle on a genre they helped influence:

"I found it really sad that these complete pioneers, who were once willing to take risks, come here to Chicago because of the house explosion. [...] They wanted to do a house record, and they didn't understand that they informed house music through people copying them. And now they're back here to copy themselves off other people?"

Jourgensen's assertion was an echo of Mick Fish's observation in his 1989 book Cabaret Voltaire: The Art of the Sixth Sense:

"It was now a fact that many of the successful funk and dance records that were racing past them and into the charts were using a 'found' vocal track over a hard rhythm, a technique [Cabaret Voltaire] had nurtured and as near as damn it invented some ten years earlier."

Alternative Press included Cabaret Voltaire in their 1996 list of "100 underground inspirations of the past 20 years."

The experimental Sensoria Music & Film Festival is named after the Cabaret Voltaire song, and has become an annual event held in Sheffield since 2008.

== Personnel ==
- Richard H. Kirk – guitars, keyboards, clarinet, saxophone, tapes, sampling, drum machines, sequencer programming (1973–1994, 2009–2021; his death)
- Stephen Mallinder – vocals, bass, keyboards, sampling (1973–1994, 2025–2026)
- Chris Watson – keyboards, tapes (1973–October 1981, 2025–2026)
- Tara Busch – live keyboards, samples (2025–2026)
- Ben Edwards (Benge) – live electronic drums, percussion, keyboards (2025–2026)
- Eric Ramsden (Eric Random) – live keyboards, guitars (2025–2026)

== Discography ==
- Mix-Up (1979)
- Three Mantras (1980)
- The Voice of America (1980)
- Red Mecca (1981)
- 2x45 (1982)
- The Crackdown (1983)
- Micro-Phonies (1984)
- The Covenant, the Sword and the Arm of the Lord (1985)
- C O D E (1987)
- Groovy, Laidback and Nasty (1990)
- Body and Soul (1991)
- Colours (1991)
- Plasticity (1992)
- International Language (1993)
- The Conversation (1994)
- Shadow of Fear (2020)
- Dekadrone (2021)
- BN9Drone (2021)

== Related projects ==
- Pressure Company pseudonym for Cabaret Voltaire for one release of the live recording from a benefit concert on January 19, 1982 at Sheffield University.
- Acid Horse featuring Al Jourgensen, Chris Connelly and Bill Rieflin with Mallinder and Kirk.
- Hafler Trio featuring Watson.
- Sweet Exorcist featuring DJ Parrot and Kirk.
- Xon featuring Kirk.

== See also ==
- Bands and musicians from Yorkshire and North East England
- Cut-up technique

== Sources ==
- Fish, Mick; Hallbery, D. (1989). Cabaret Voltaire: The Art of the Sixth Sense (2 ed.). Middlesex, UK: SAF Publishing Ltd. ISBN 0946719039.
- Gimarc, George (2005). Punk Diary: The Ultimate Trainspotter's Guide to Underground Rock: 1970 - 1982. San Francisco: Backbeat Books. ISBN 0-87930-848-6.
