= Rough Trade Records =

English independent record label

- Parent company: Beggars Group (branding licensed from Rough Trade)
- Founded: 1976
- Founder: Geoff Travis
- Distributor: Beggars Group
- Genre: Indie music, rock
- Country of origin: United Kingdom
- Location: London, England
- Official website: roughtraderecords.com

Rough Trade Records is an independent record label based in London, England. It was formed in 1976 by Geoff Travis, who had opened a record store off Ladbroke Grove. It is currently run by co-managing directors Travis and Jeannette Lee and is affiliated with Beggars Group.

Having successfully promoted and sold records by punk rock and early post-punk and indie pop bands such as the Normal and Desperate Bicycles, Travis began to manage acts and distribute bands such as Scritti Politti and began the label, which was informed by left-wing politics and structured as a co-operative. Label activities began in 1978. Soon after, Rough Trade also set up a distribution arm that serviced independent retail outlets across Britain, a network that became known as the Cartel. In 1983, Rough Trade signed the Smiths.

Interest and investment of major labels in the UK indie scene in the late 1980s, as well as overtrading on behalf of Rough Trade's distribution wing, led to cash flow problems, and eventually to bankruptcy, forcing the label into receivership.

However, Travis resurrected the label in the late 1990s partnering with Lee, finding success with the Libertines, the Strokes, Anohni and the Johnsons and more. The roster is diverse, with Pulp, Sleaford Mods, Dean Blunt, black midi, Special Interest, Jockstrap and Lankum among those signed to the label, which has ranged stylistically through alternative rock, post-punk and new wave, garage rock, and psychedelic rock, but also art pop, folk, electronic, and soul.

== History ==
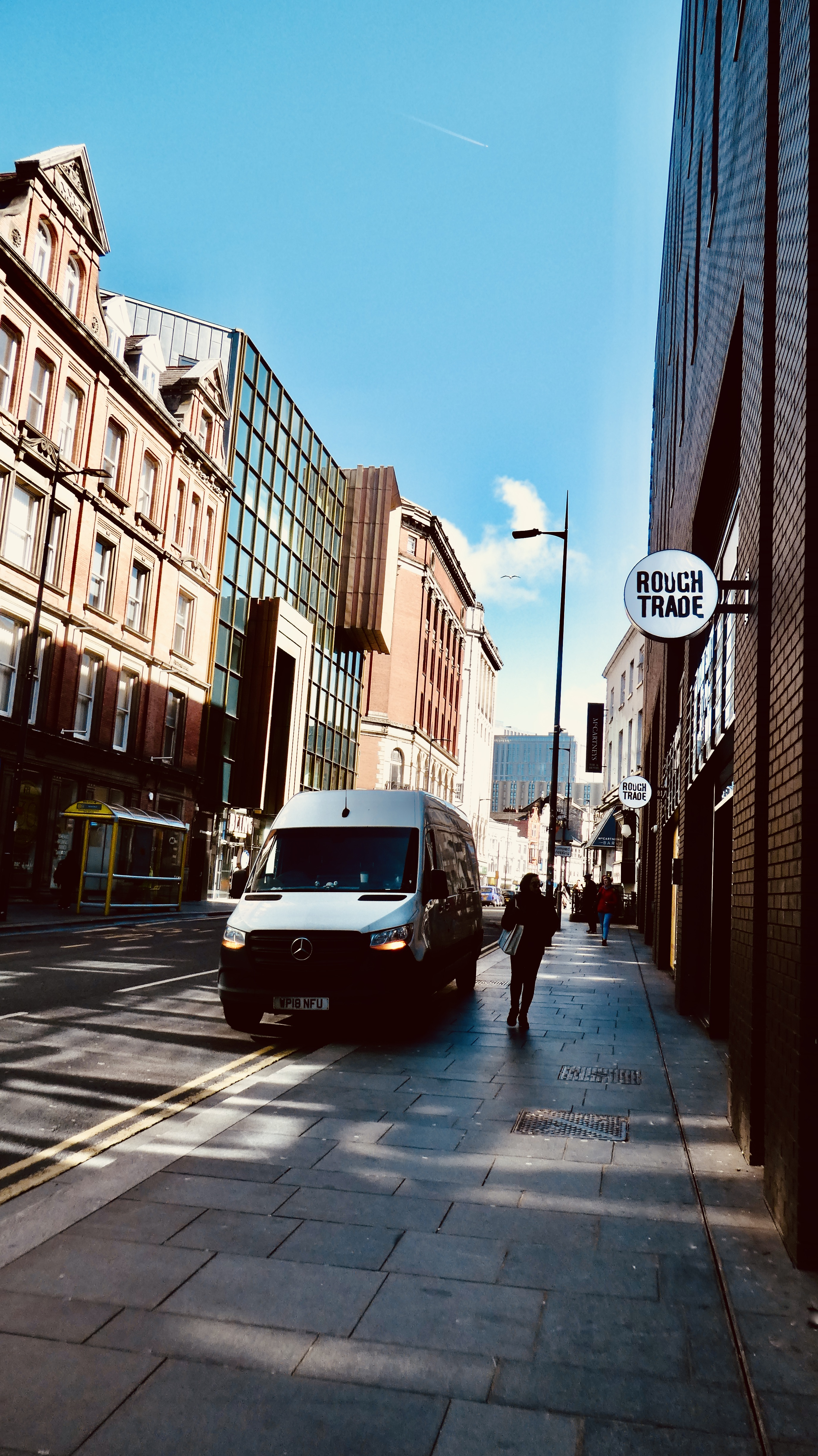
Rough Trade's largest UK store opened in Liverpool in 2024.

Rough Trade began as a record shop, opened by Geoff Travis on Kensington Park Road, West London, in February 1976, with Travis reportedly taking the shop name from the Canadian art punk/new wave band Rough Trade. It was inspired by what Travis has described as the "community-based environment" of the City Lights Bookstore in San Francisco, and specialised in garage rock and reggae. Steve Montgomery, initially a customer of the shop, was offered a job soon after it opened and became its effective co-manager. Travis and Montgomery were joined by a further employee, Richard Scott, in June 1977.

Rough Trade produced its own record for the first time after French punk band Métal Urbain came into the shop asking for assistance in publicising their music.

The Rough Trade label subsequently issued a single by Jamaican reggae musician Augustus Pablo, the debut EP by Sheffield band Cabaret Voltaire and the second Stiff Little Fingers single, "Alternative Ulster". During 1978, the label released singles by the Monochrome Set, Subway Sect, Swell Maps, Electric Eels, Spizzoil and Kleenex. In 1979, Rough Trade's first album, Inflammable Material by Stiff Little Fingers, reached number 14 in the UK charts and became the first independently released album to sell over 100,000 copies in the UK. Rough Trade's significance by this time was such that it was made the subject of a South Bank Show documentary. By the mid-1980s the label was seeking partnerships with bands from multiple genres, stating that "Hardcore, Dance, Reggae, Experimental & undefinable are all welcome." In 1988 the label encountered financial troubles linked to the distribution arm, however singles continued to be released on the label in the U.K. until 1990.

Rough Trade Records was relaunched in 2000 as an independently owned entity, a partnership between Travis, Jeannette Lee (a former member of Public Image Ltd.), and minority partners Sanctuary Records, as a part of the Zomba Group until 11 June 2002 when BMG bought out this business. Prior to the BMG buyout, Rough Trade Records released the Strokes' debut EP The Modern Age in the spring of 2001. In July 2007 Sanctuary Records then sold its stake in Rough Trade to the Beggars Group for £800,000 making Rough Trade independent once again. However, it can be argued that Rough Trade is not truly independent as it is owned by another company. Rough Trade is more accurately a subsidiary that is owed by Beggars Group, which in turn is a privately held company not publicly traded on the stock market. Throughout this period, and continuing under Beggars, the label has been co-managed by Lee and Travis.
