= Five Knuckle Shuffle =

Five Knuckle Shuffle may refer to:

- Five Knuckle Shuffle (John Cena signature move), the signature move of professional wrestler John Cena
- Masturbation, in British slang
- "We Hate You (Little Girls)/Five Knuckle Shuffle", a single by Throbbing Gristle
