= Sleep (disambiguation) =

Human sleep and sleep in animals are a form of rest.

Sleep or sleeping may also refer to:

== People with the name ==
- Sleep (rapper) (born 1976), American underground hip hop artist
- Colin Sleep (born 1944), Australian footballer
- Norman Sleep (born 1945), American geophysicist
- Peter Sleep (born 1957), Australian cricketer
- Wayne Sleep (born 1948), British dancer, director, and choreographer

== Arts, entertainment, and media ==
=== Films ===
- Sleep (1964 film), a 1964 film by Andy Warhol
- Sleep (2013 film), a 2013 film directed by Juha Lilja
- Sleep (2023 film), a 2023 film directed by Jason Yu

=== Music ===
==== Groups ====
- Sleep (band), American doom metal band

==== Albums ====
- Sleep (album), a 2015 album by Max Richter
- Sleep, a 2001 EP by Strata

==== Classical compositions ====
- "Sleep" (Eric Whitacre song), a 2000 choral piece
- "Sleep", a 1912 song by Ivor Gurney
- "Sleep", a 1922 composition by Peter Warlock
- "Sleep", a 2006 song by Richard Causton
- "Sleep", a 2010 song by Ronald Corp
- Søvnen (The Sleep), a 1905 cantata by Carl Nielsen

==== Songs ====
- "Sleep" (1923 song), by Fred Waring's Pennsylvanians
- "Sleep" (Marion song), 1995
- "Sleep" (Texas song), 2006
- "Sleep", by the 3rd and the Mortal from In This Room, 1997
- "Sleep (I've Been Slipping)", by Code Orange Kids from Love Is Love/Return to Dust, 2012
- "Sleep", by Conjure One from Conjure One, 2002
- "Sleep", by Copeland from In Motion, 2005
- "Sleep", by Cult of Luna from Cult of Luna, 2001
- "Sleep", by The Dandy Warhols from Thirteen Tales from Urban Bohemia, 2000
- "Sleep", by Donovan from Cosmic Wheels, 1973
- "Sleep", by Godspeed You! Black Emperor from Lift Your Skinny Fists Like Antennas to Heaven, 2000
- "Sleep", by Imogen Heap from IMegaphone, 1998
- "Sleep", by Johnny Orlando from Teenage Fever, 2019
- "Sleep", by King Gizzard and the Lizard Wizard from Teenage Gizzard, 2020
- "Sleep", by Lagwagon from Hoss, 1995
- "Sleep", by Lazlo Bane from 11 Transistor, 1997
- "Sleep", by Midnight Oil from Red Sails in the Sunset, 1984
- "Sleep", by My Chemical Romance from The Black Parade, 2006
- "Sleep", by Nada Surf from High/Low, 1996
- "Sleep", by Phish from Farmhouse, 2000
- "Sleep", by Poets of the Fall from Signs of Life, 2005
- "Sleep", by Savatage from Edge of Thorns, 1993
- "Sleep", by Stabbing Westward from Wither Blister Burn & Peel, 1996
- "Sleep", by Story of the Year from In the Wake of Determination, 2005
- "Sleep" (Sid song), 2010
- "Sleep", by Transit from Young New England, 2013
- "Sleep", by Underground Lovers from Underground Lovers, 1990
- "Sleep", by Wuthering Heights from The Shadow Cabinet, 2006
- "Sleep!" by Big Black from Racer-X, 1984
- "Sleep Song", by Rooney from Calling the World, 2007
- "Sleep Song", by Raffi from Good Luck Boy, 1975
- "Sleepin'", by Diana Ross from Last Time I Saw Him, 1973
- "Sleepin'", by Relient K from Air for Free, 2016
- "Sleepin'", by Neil Cicierega from Mouth Dreams, 2020
- "Sleeping" (The Band song), 1970
- "Sleeping" (Rick Astley song), 2001
- "Sleeping", a song by Gigi Perez from At the Beach, in Every Life
- "The Sleep", by Pantera from Cowboys from Hell, 1990

=== Paintings ===
- Sleep (Sher-Gil), a 1933 painting by Amrita Sher-Gil
- Sleep, a 1937 painting by Salvador Dalí
- Sleep (Puvis de Chavannes), a 1867 painting by Pierre Puvis de Chavannes
- The Sleep (Baba), by Corneliu Baba

=== Periodicals ===
- Sleep (journal), a medical journal covering research on sleep

== Computing and technology ==
- Sleep (command), a command that delays program execution for a specified period of time
- Sleep (system call), an operating system call to suspend the execution of a program for specified period of time
- Sleep mode, in which a computer becomes inactive
- Sleep programming language, a scripting language executed on the Java platform

== Science ==
- Rheum, commonly known as "sleep", mucus formed in the eyes during sleep
- To "sleep with someone", implies a person having sexual intercourse or other forms of sexual activity with another person
- Transient paresthesia, the sensation produced by an extremity which has "fallen asleep"

== See also ==
- Asleep (disambiguation)
- The Big Sleep (disambiguation)
