= Falling Asleep =

Falling asleep is the act of going to sleep.

Falling asleep may also refer to:

- "Falling Asleep", a song by Dominic Fike from the 2018 EP Don't Forget About Me, Demos
- "Falling Asleep", a song by the Clientele from the 2017 album Music for the Age of Miracles
- Transient paresthesia, the sensation produced by an extremity which has "fallen asleep"

== See also ==
- Falling Asleep at the Wheel (disambiguation)
- Sleep (disambiguation)
