= Unihemispheric slow-wave sleep =

Sleep in which half the brain remains alert

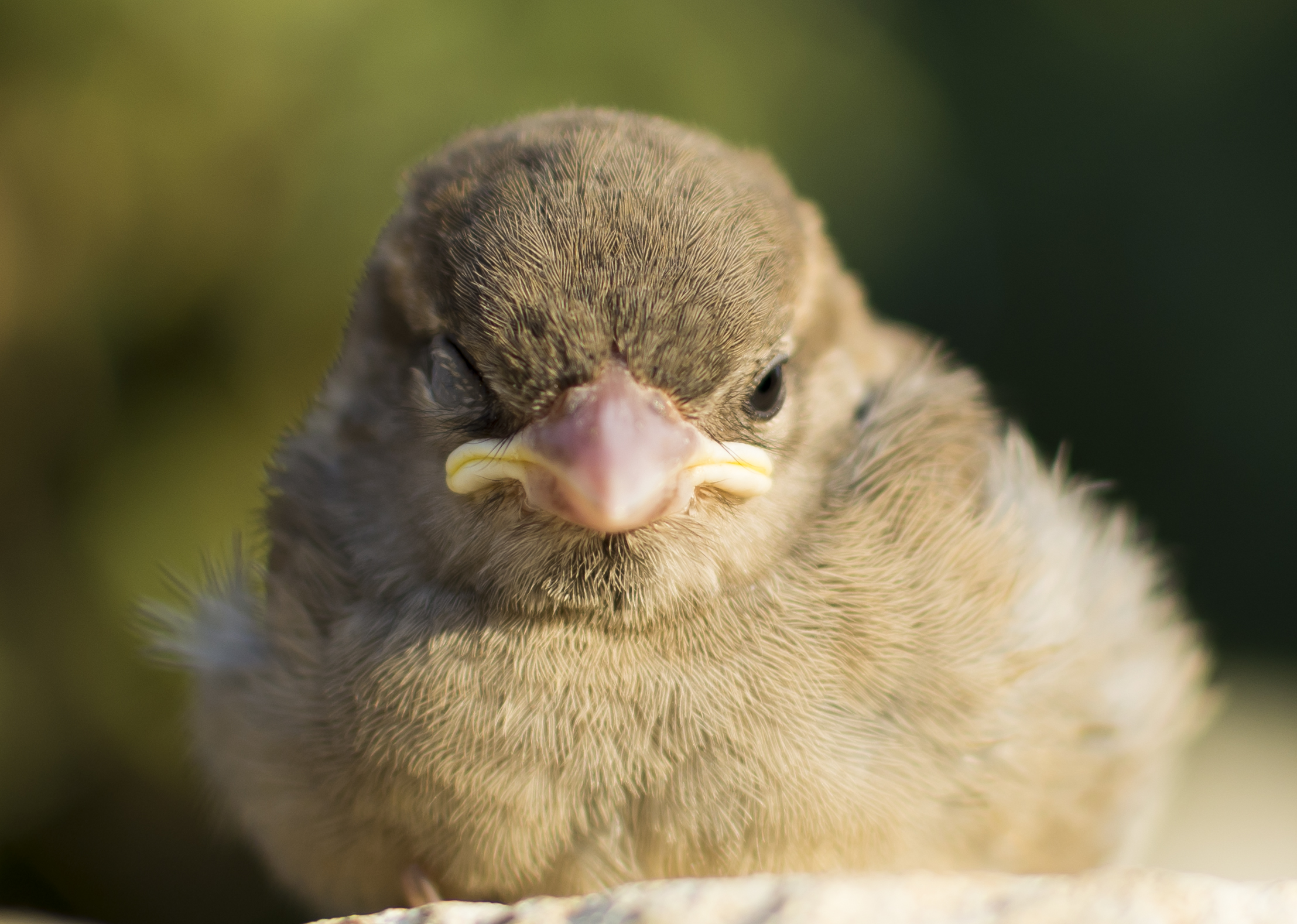
A young house sparrow (Passer domesticus) exhibits unihemispheric slow-wave sleep.

Unihemispheric slow-wave sleep (USWS) is sleep where one half of the brain rests while the other half remains alert. This is in contrast to normal sleep where both eyes are shut and both halves of the brain show unconsciousness. In USWS, also known as asymmetric slow-wave sleep, one half of the brain is in deep sleep, a form of non-rapid eye movement sleep and the eye corresponding to this half is closed while the other eye remains open. When examined by electroencephalography (EEG), the characteristic slow-wave sleep tracings are seen from one side while the other side shows a characteristic tracing of wakefulness. The phenomenon has been observed in a number of terrestrial, aquatic and avian species.

Unique physiology, including the differential release of the neurotransmitter acetylcholine, has been linked to the phenomenon. USWS offers a number of benefits, including the ability to rest in areas of high predation or during long migratory flights. The behaviour remains an important research topic because USWS is possibly the first animal behaviour which uses different regions of the brain to simultaneously control sleep and wakefulness. The greatest theoretical importance of USWS is its potential role in elucidating the function of sleep by challenging various current notions. Researchers have looked to animals exhibiting USWS to determine if sleep must be essential; otherwise, species exhibiting USWS would have eliminated the behaviour altogether through evolution.

The amount of time spent sleeping during the unihemispheric slow-wave stage is considerably less than the bilateral slow-wave sleep. In the past, aquatic animals, such as dolphins and seals, had to regularly surface in order to breathe and regulate body temperature. USWS might have been generated by the need to perform these vital activities simultaneously with sleep.

On land, birds can switch between sleeping with both hemispheres to one hemisphere. Due to their poorly webbed feet and long wings, which are not completely waterproof, it is not energetically efficient for them to make rest stops or land on water, only to take flight again. Using unihemispheric slow-wave sleep, birds are able to maintain environmental awareness and aerodynamic control of wings while obtaining the necessary sleep they need to sustain attention during wakefulness. Their sleep is more asymmetric in flight than on land, and they sleep mostly while circling air currents during flight. The eye connected to the awake hemisphere of their brain is the one facing the direction of flight. Once they land, they pay off their sleep debt, as their REM sleep duration significantly decreases and slow-wave sleep increases.

Despite the reduced sleep quantity, species having USWS do not present limits at a behavioral or healthy level. Cetaceans, such as dolphins, show preserved health as well as great memory skills. Indeed, cetaceans, seals, and birds compensate for the lack of complete sleep with efficient immune systems, preserved brain plasticity, thermoregulation, and restoration of brain metabolism.

== Physiology ==
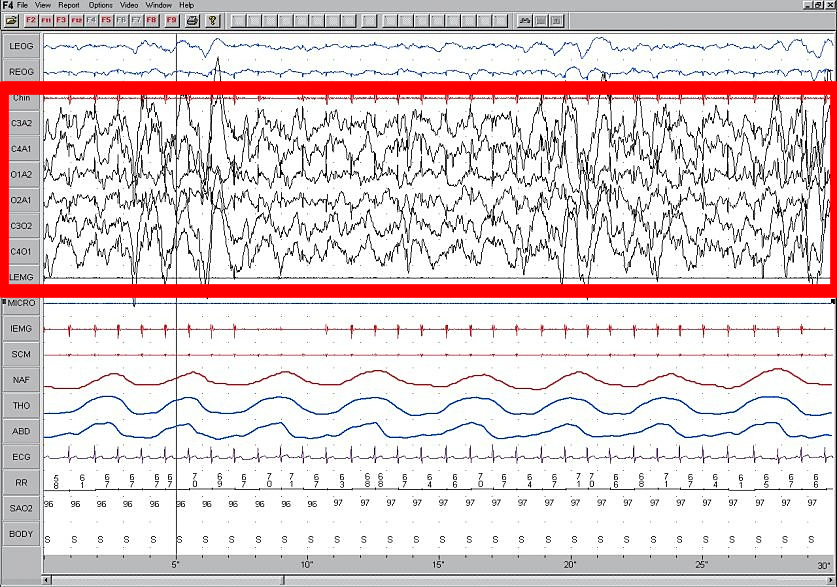
Polysomnogram demonstrating slow-wave sleep. High amplitude EEG is highlighted in red.

Slow-wave sleep (SWS), also known as Stage 3, is characterized by a lack of movement and difficulty of arousal. Slow-wave sleep occurring in both hemispheres is referred to as bihemispheric slow-wave sleep (BSWS) and is common among most animals. Slow-wave sleep contrasts with rapid eye movement sleep (REM), which can only occur simultaneously in both hemispheres. In most animals, slow-wave sleep is characterized by high amplitude, low frequency EEG readings. This is also known as the desynchronized state of the brain, or deep sleep.

In USWS, only one hemisphere exhibits the deep sleep EEG while the other hemisphere exhibits an EEG typical of wakefulness with a low amplitude and high frequency. There also exist instances in which hemispheres are in transitional stages of sleep, but they have not been the subject of study due to their ambiguous nature. USWS represents the first known behavior in which one part of the brain controls sleep while another part controls wakefulness.

Generally, when the whole amount of sleeping of each hemisphere is summed, both hemispheres get equal amounts of USWS. However, when every single session is taken into account, a large asymmetry of USWS episodes can be observed. This information suggests that at one time the neural circuit is more active in one hemisphere than on the other one and vice versa the following time.

According to Fuller, awakening is characterized by high activity of neural groups that promote awakening: they activate the cortex as well as subcortical structures and simultaneously inhibit neural groups which promotes sleep. Therefore, sleep is defined by the opposite mechanism. It can be assumed that cetaceans show a similar structure, but the neural groups are stimulated according to the need of each hemisphere. So, neural mechanisms that promote sleep are predominant in the sleeping hemisphere, while the ones that promote awakening are more active in the non-sleeping hemisphere.

=== Role of acetylcholine ===
Due to the origin of USWS in the brain, neurotransmitters are believed to be involved in its regulation. The neurotransmitter acetylcholine has been linked to hemispheric activation in northern fur seals. Researchers studied seals in controlled environments by observing behaviour as well as through surgically implanted EEG electrodes. Acetylcholine is released in nearly the same amounts per hemisphere in bilateral slow-wave sleep. However, in USWS, the maximal release of the cortical acetylcholine neurotransmitter is lateralized to the hemisphere exhibiting an EEG trace resembling wakefulness. The hemisphere exhibiting SWS is marked by the minimal release of acetylcholine. This model of acetylcholine release has been further discovered in additional species such as the bottlenose dolphin.

=== Eye opening ===
In domestic chicks and other species of birds exhibiting USWS, one eye remained open contra-lateral (on the opposite side) to the "awake" hemisphere. The closed eye was shown to be opposite the hemisphere engaging in slow-wave sleep. Learning tasks, such as those including predator recognition, demonstrated the open eye could be preferential. This has also been shown to be the favored behavior of belugas, although inconsistencies have arisen directly relating the sleeping hemisphere and open eye. Keeping one eye open aids birds in engaging in USWS while mid-flight as well as helping them observe predators in their vicinity. Crocodilians have also been shown to sleep with one eye open.

Given that USWS is preserved also in blind animals or during a lack of visual stimuli, it cannot be considered as a consequence of keeping an eye open while sleeping. Furthermore, the open eye in dolphins does not forcibly activate the contralateral hemisphere. Although unilateral vision plays a considerable role in keeping active the contralateral hemisphere, it is not the motive power of USWS. Consequently, USWS might be generated by endogenous mechanisms.

=== Thermoregulation ===
Brain temperature has been shown to drop when a sleeping EEG is exhibited in one or both hemispheres. This decrease in temperature has been linked to a method to thermoregulate and conserve energy while maintaining the vigilance of USWS. The thermoregulation has been demonstrated in dolphins and is believed to be conserved among species exhibiting USWS.

== Anatomical variations ==
=== Smaller corpus callosum ===
USWS requires hemispheric separation to isolate the cerebral hemispheres enough to ensure that the one can engage in SWS while the other is awake. The corpus callosum is the anatomical structure in the mammalian brain which allows for interhemispheric communication. Cetaceans have been observed to have a smaller corpus callosum when compared to other mammals. Similarly, birds lack a corpus callosum altogether and have only few means of interhemispheric connections. Other evidence contradicts this potential role; sagittal transsections of the corpus callosum have been found to result in strictly bihemispheric sleep. As a result, it seems this anatomical difference, though well correlated, does not directly explain the existence of USWS.

=== Noradrenergic diffuse modulatory system variations ===
A promising method of identifying the neuroanatomical structures responsible for USWS is continuing comparisons of brains that exhibit USWS with those that do not. Some studies have shown induced asynchronous SWS in non-USWS-exhibiting animals as a result of sagittal transactions of subcortical regions, including the lower brainstem, while leaving the corpus callosum intact. Other comparisons found that mammals exhibiting USWS have a larger posterior commissure and increased decussation of ascending fibres from the locus coeruleus in the brainstem. This is consistent with the fact that one form for neuromodulation, the noradrenergic diffuse modulatory system present in the locus coeruleus, is involved in regulating arousal, attention, and sleep-wake cycles.

During USWS the proportion of noradrenergic secretion is asymmetric. It is indeed high in the awaken hemisphere and low in the sleeping one. The continuous discharge of noradrenergic neurons stimulates heat production: the awake hemisphere of dolphins shows a higher, but stable, temperature. On the contrary, the sleeping hemisphere reports a slightly lower temperature compared to the other hemisphere. According to researchers, the difference in hemispheric temperatures may play a role in shifting between the SWS and awaken status.

=== Complete crossing of the optic nerve ===
Complete crossing (decussation) of the nerves at the optic chiasm in birds has also stimulated research. Complete decussation of the optic tract has been seen as a method of ensuring the open eye strictly activates the contralateral hemisphere. Some evidence indicates that this alone is not enough as blindness would theoretically prevent USWS if retinal nerve stimuli were the sole player. However, USWS is still exhibited in blinded birds despite the absence of visual input.

== Benefits ==
Many species of birds and marine mammals have advantages due to their unihemispheric slow-wave sleep capability, including, but not limited to, increased ability to evade potential predators and the ability to sleep during migration. Unihemispheric sleep allows visual vigilance of the environment, preservation of movement, and in cetaceans, control of the respiratory system.

=== Adaptation to high-risk predation ===
Most species of birds are able to detect approaching predators during unihemispheric slow-wave sleep. During flight, birds maintain visual vigilance by utilizing USWS and by keeping one eye open. The utilization of unihemispheric slow-wave sleep by avian species is directly proportional to the risk of predation. In other words, the usage of USWS of certain species of birds increases as the risk of predation increases.

==== Survival of the fittest adaptation ====
The evolution of both cetaceans and birds may have involved some mechanisms for the purpose of increasing the likelihood of avoiding predators. Certain species, especially of birds, that acquired the ability to perform unihemispheric slow-wave sleep had an advantage and were more likely to escape their potential predators over other species that lacked the ability.

==== Regulation based on surroundings ====
Birds can sleep more efficiently with both hemispheres sleeping simultaneously (bihemispheric slow-wave sleep) when in safe conditions, but will increase the usage of USWS if they are in a potentially more dangerous environment. It is more beneficial to sleep using both hemispheres; however, the positives of unihemispheric slow-wave sleep prevail over its negatives under extreme conditions. While in unihemispheric slow-wave sleep, birds will sleep with one open eye towards the direction from which predators are more likely to approach. When birds do this in a flock, it's called the "group edge effect".

The mallard is one bird that has been used experimentally to illustrate the "group edge effect". Birds positioned at the edge of the flock are most alert, scanning often for predators. These birds are more at risk than the birds in the center of the flock and are required to be on the lookout for both their own safety and the safety of the group as a whole. They have been observed spending more time in unihemispheric slow-wave sleep than the birds in the center. Since USWS allows for the one eye to be open, the cerebral hemisphere that undergoes slow-wave sleep varies depending on the position of the bird relative to the rest of the flock. If the bird's left side is facing outward, the left hemisphere will be in slow-wave sleep; if the bird's right side is facing outward, the right hemisphere will be in slow-wave sleep. This is because the eyes are contralateral to the left and right hemispheres of the cerebral cortex. The open eye of the bird is always directed towards the outside of the group, in the direction from which predators could potentially attack.

=== Surfacing for air and pod cohesion ===
Unihemispheric slow-wave sleep seems to allow the simultaneous sleeping and surfacing to breathe of aquatic mammals including both dolphins and seals. Bottlenose dolphins are one specific species of cetaceans that have been proven experimentally to use USWS in order to maintain both swimming patterns and the surfacing for air while sleeping.

In addition, a reversed version of the "group edge effect" has been observed in pods of Pacific white-sided dolphins. Dolphins swimming on the left side of the pod have their right eyes open while dolphins swimming on the right side of the pod have their left eyes open. Unlike in some species of birds, the open eyes of these cetaceans are facing the inside of the group, not the outside. The dangers of possible predation do not play a significant role during USWS in Pacific white-sided dolphins. It has been suggested that this species utilizes this reversed version of the "group edge effect" in order to maintain pod formation and cohesion while maintaining unihemispheric slow-wave sleep.

=== Rest during long bird flights ===
While migrating, birds may undergo unihemispheric slow-wave sleep in order to simultaneously sleep and visually navigate flight. Certain species may thus avoid a need to make frequent stops along the way. Certain bird species are more likely to utilize USWS during soaring flight, but it is possible for birds to undergo USWS in flapping flight as well. Much is still unknown about the usage of unihemispheric slow-wave sleep, since the inter-hemispheric EEG asymmetry that is viewed in idle birds may not be equivalent to that of birds that are flying.

== Species exhibiting USWS ==
Although humans show reduced left-hemisphere delta waves during slow-wave sleep in an unfamiliar bedchamber, this is not wakeful alertness of USWS.

=== Aquatic mammals ===
==== Cetaceans ====
Of all the cetacean species, USWS has been found to be exhibited in the following species

- Amazon river dolphin (Inia geoffrensis)
- Beluga whale (Delphinapterus leucus)
- Narwhal (Monodon monoceros)
- Bottlenose dolphin (Tursiops truncatus)
- Pacific white-sided dolphin (Sagmatias obliquidens)
- Pilot whale (Globicephala scammoni)
- False killer whale (Pseudorca crassidens)
- Porpoise (Phocoena phocoena)
- Orca (Orcinus orca)
- Sperm whale (Physeter macrocephalus)

==== Pinnipeds ====
Though pinnipeds are capable of sleeping on either land or water, it has been found that pinnipeds that exhibit USWS do so at a higher rate while sleeping in water. Though no USWS has been observed in true seals, four different species of eared seals have been found to exhibit USWS including

- Northern fur seal (Callorhinus ursinus)

Significant research has been done illustrating that the northern fur seal can alternate between BSWS and USWS depending on its location while sleeping. While on land, 69% of all SWS is present bilaterally; however, when sleep takes place in water, 68% of all SWS is found with interhemispheric EEG asymmetry, indicating USWS.

- Southern sea lion (Otari bryonia)
- Steller sea lion (Eumetopias jubatus)

==== Sirenia ====
In the final order of aquatic mammals, sirenia, experiments have only exhibited USWS in the Amazonian manatee (Trichechus inunguis).

=== Birds ===
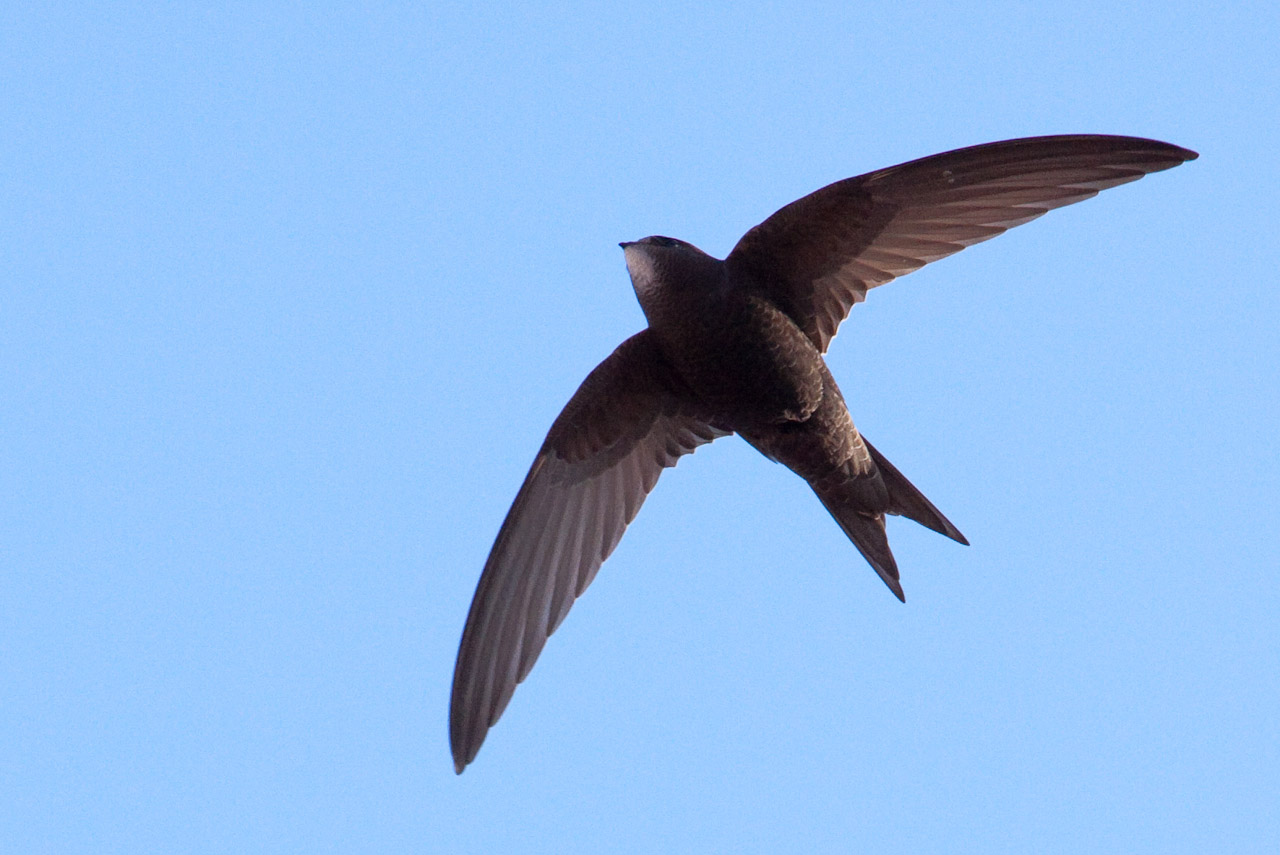
Common swift

The common swift (Apus apus) was the best candidate for research aimed at determining whether or not birds exhibiting USWS can sleep in flight. The selection of the common swift as a model stemmed from observations elucidating the fact that the common swift left its nest at night, only returning in the early morning. Still, evidence for USWS is strictly circumstantial and based on the notion that if swifts must sleep to survive, they must do so via aerial roosting as little time is spent sleeping in a nest.

Multiple other species of birds have also been found to exhibit USWS, including:

- Common blackbird (Turdus merula)
- Domestic chicken (Gallus gallus domesticus),
- Glaucous-winged gull (Larus glaucescens)
- Japanese quail (Coturnix japonica)
- Mallard (Anas platyrhynchos).
- Northern bobwhite (Colinus virginianus),
- Orange-fronted parakeet (Aratinga canicularis)
- Peregrine falcon (Falco peregrinus)
- White-crowned sparrow (Zonotrichia leucophrys gambelii)

== Future research ==
Recent studies have illustrated that the white-crowned sparrow, as well as other passerines, have the capability of sleeping most significantly during the migratory season while in flight. However, the sleep patterns in this study were observed during migratory restlessness in captivity and might not be analogous to those of free-flying birds. Free-flying birds might be able to spend some time sleeping while in non-migratory flight as well when in the unobstructed sky as opposed to in controlled captive conditions. To truly determine if birds can sleep in flight, recordings of brain activity must take place during flight instead of after landing. A method of recording brain activity in pigeons during flight has recently proven promising in that it could obtain an EEG of each hemisphere but for relatively short periods of time. Coupled with simulated wind tunnels in a controlled setting, these new methods of measuring brain activity could elucidate the truth behind whether or not birds sleep during flight.

Additionally, based on research elucidating the role of acetylcholine in control of USWS, additional neurotransmitters are being researched to understand their roles in the asymmetric sleep model.

== See also ==
- Sleep in animals
