= The Sleep (Baba) =

Painting by Corneliu Baba

- Somnul (Romanian)
- Artist: Corneliu Baba
- Year: 1959
- Medium: oil on canvas
- Dimensions: 100 cm × 120 cm (39 in × 47 in)
- Location: Muzeul de Artă; Timișoara

The Sleep (Romanian Somnul) is an oil painting by Corneliu Baba, from 1959.

== Description ==
The painting size is 100 x 120 cm. It is in the collection of the Timișoara Art Museum.

== Analysis ==
Two working people sleep in their clothes on a brown field. His realist works show working people.

== Sources ==
Pavel Susara (2001). Corneliu Baba: Eastern European Painter. Parkstone - D.O.R. ISBN 9781859957455.
