= Sleep (Puvis de Chavannes) =

Painting by Pierre Puvis de Chavannes

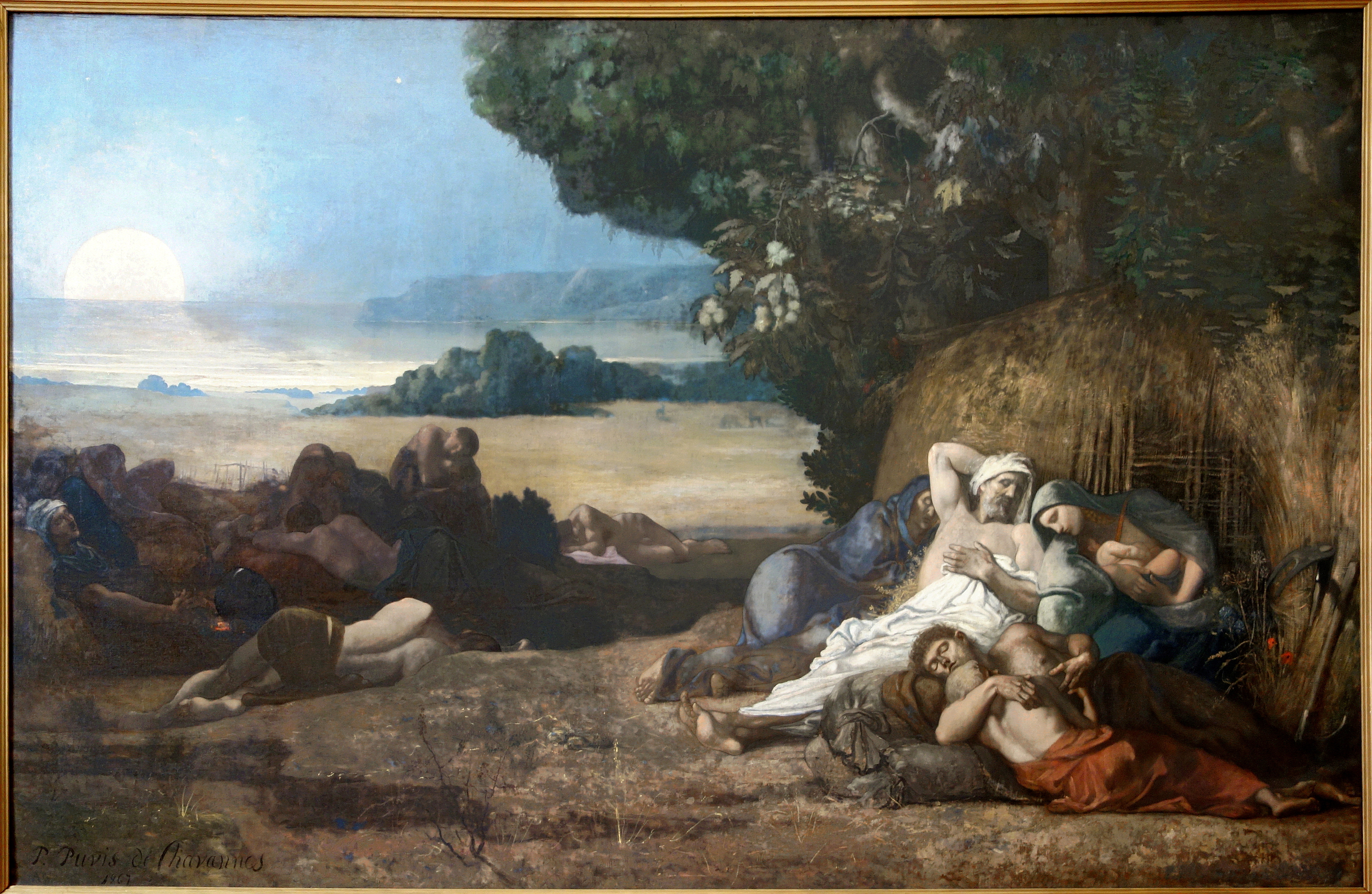
- Artist: Pierre Puvis de Chavannes
- Year: 1867
- Medium: Oil on canvas
- Dimensions: 381 cm × 600 cm (150 in × 240 in)
- Location: Palais des Beaux-Arts de Lille, Lille

Sleep is an oil on canvas painting by the painter Pierre Puvis de Chavannes, created in 1867. A large painting, it is held at the Palais des Beaux-Arts de Lille.

== History ==
Presented at the Salon of French Artists of 1867, the painting was inspired by a verse from Virgil's, Aeneid (II, 268). This painting demonstrates Puvis de Chavannes departing from the romantic tradition that marked his early work. It can be considered the first symbolist painting in French art.

== Description ==
The scene depicts the rest of simple peasants. In the foreground on the right, an elderly woman and an old man, a woman and her child, a man and his son, represent the stages of life. On the left, a more indistinct group of figures seems absorbed by the semi-darkness. The reduced palette, with muted tones of beige, blue and pink, which only the setting sun illuminates, creates an atmosphere of torpor. It seems that the painting deals with the feeling of half consciousness, between waking and falling asleep, which drowsiness causes and which the viewer also experiences while contemplating the painting.

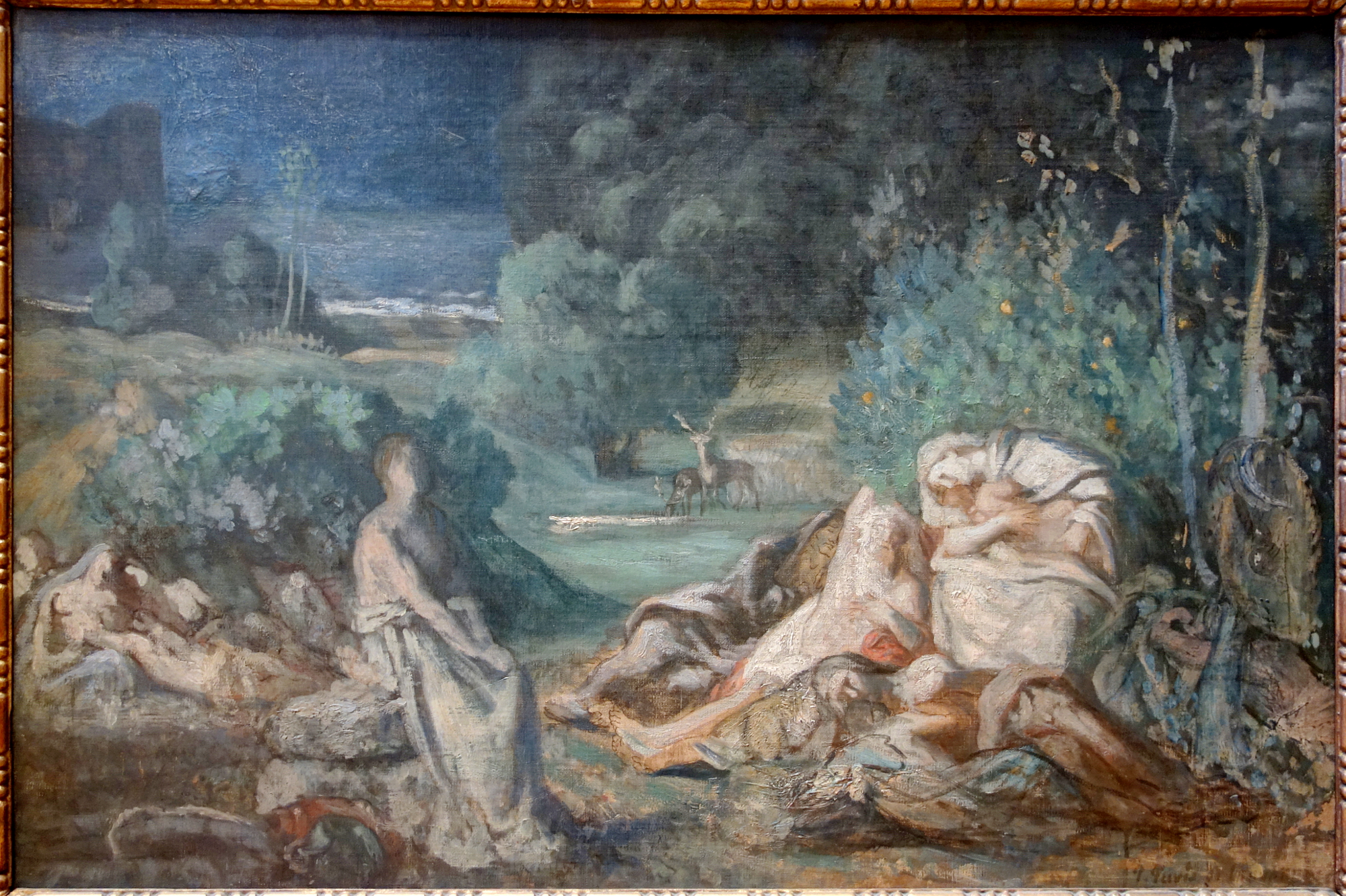
Sleep, sketch from before 1867, Palais des Beaux-Arts de Lille

== Analysis ==
Before making the large format final painting, Puvis created an unusual number of drawings and painted sketches, some of which were quite different from the final work. One of them, offered by Puvis de Chavannes to the painter Francis Auburtin, then by the latter's family to the Louvre, is today kept in the Palais des Beaux-Arts de Lille, on deposit of the Musée d'Orsay.

Puvis considered this painting his favorite work, and he created several replicas of Sleep, drawn or painted, of smaller size. One of them, who once belong to French stockbroker Theodore Gadala is kept at the Metropolitan Museum of Art, in New York.
