= Asleep (disambiguation) =

Asleep or sleep is a naturally recurring state characterized by reduced or absent consciousness.

Asleep may also refer to:

- Asleep (novel), a 1989 novel by Banana Yoshimoto
- Asleep (poem), a poem by Wilfred Owen
- "Asleep" (song), a 1985 song by the Smiths
