= Falling Asleep at the Wheel =

Falling Asleep at the Wheel may refer to:

- The act of falling asleep at the wheel, caused by driving whilst sleep-deprived
- Falling Asleep at the Wheel (EP), a 2020 EP by Holly Humberstone
  - The EP's title track, 2020
- "Falling Asleep at the Wheel" (song), by the Rubens and Vic Mensa, 2019
