= Sleep in animals =

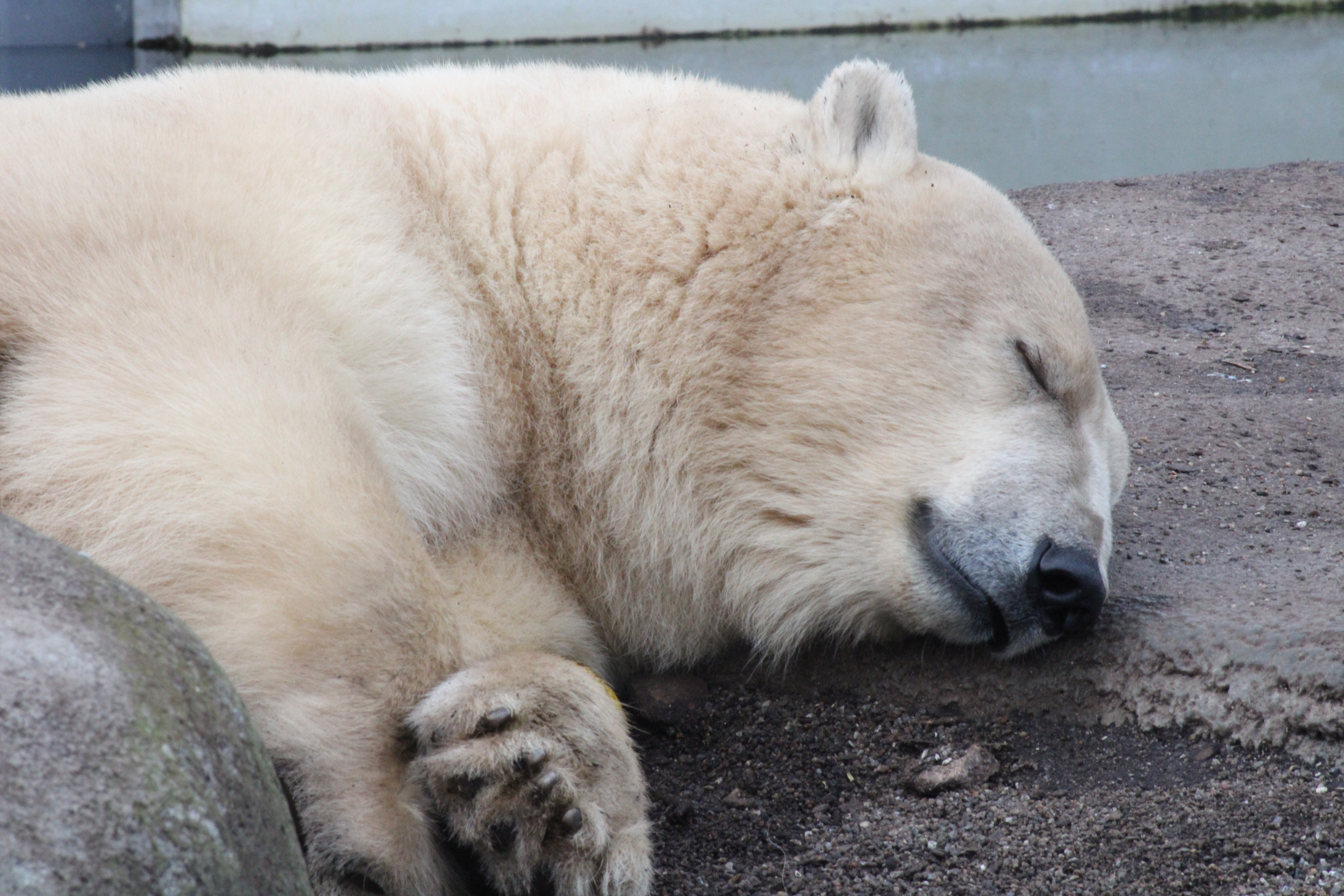
A polar bear sleeping at Copenhagen Zoo, Denmark

Sleep is broadly considered a biological necessity in virtually all animals. The large majority of such taxa with documented sleep physiology are bilaterians, though there is increasing evidence of sleep or sleep-like states in non-bilaterians such as Cassiopea jellyfish and hydra (both cnidarians), and sponges. The various criteria which biologists use to define sleep states have been observed in all other animal phyla, often with profound variation in function. In all of these taxa except sponges, regulation of sleep is documented to involve genes whose transcription oscillates with time, known as circadian or clock genes. These genes and the gene networks they regulate give rise to the internal circadian clock. The three categories of biological sleep schedules are diurnal, nocturnal, and crepuscular which characterize species whose waking periods mostly overlap with day, night, and twilight respectively. Specific sleep patterns and durations vary widely among and sometimes within sleeping species, with some sleeping or foregoing sleep for extended periods. Others, such as some porpoises, engage in unihemispheric sleep where only one brain hemisphere sleeps at a time in order to maintain motion or homeostasis in marine environments.

The presence of some version of sleep physiology is nearly universally conserved within animals, suggesting a very ancient evolutionary origin. Chronobiological mechanisms more broadly (i.e. non-sleep biological processes which oscillate at various periods) are documented among many microbes and thus are likely much older, reflecting the day-night cycle as perhaps one of the earliest environmental stimuli used for the regulation of genes. This has led some evolutionary biologists to suggest that time-based oscillations in activity are a possible form of ancient, time-based niche partitioning to minimize competition during the same portions of the day.

== Definition ==
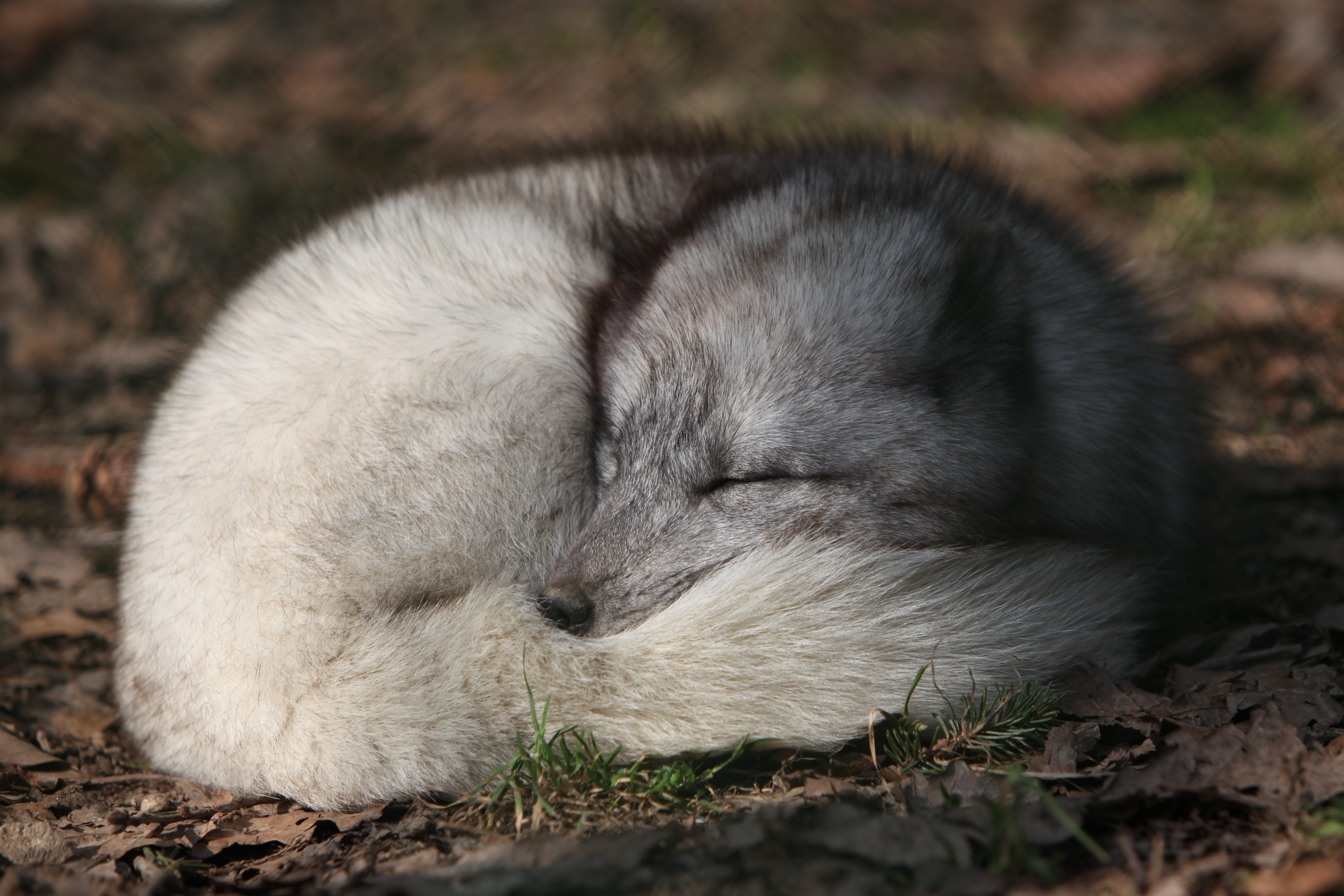
A sleeping Arctic fox

Sleep can follow a physiological or behavioral definition. In the physiological sense, sleep is a state characterized by reversible unconsciousness, special brainwave patterns, sporadic eye movement, loss of muscle tone (possibly with some exceptions; see below regarding the sleep of birds and of aquatic mammals), and a compensatory increase following deprivation of the state, this last known as sleep homeostasis (i.e., the longer a waking state lasts, the greater the intensity and duration of the sleep state thereafter). In the behavioral sense, sleep is characterized by minimal movement, non-responsiveness to external stimuli (i.e. increased sensory threshold), the adoption of a typical posture, and the occupation of a sheltered site, all of which is usually repeated on a 24-hour basis. The physiological definition applies well to birds and mammals, but in other animals whose brains are not as complex, the behavioral definition is more often used. In very simple animals, behavioral definitions of sleep are the only ones possible, and even then the behavioral repertoire of the animal may not be extensive enough to allow distinction between sleep and wakefulness. Sleep is quickly reversible, as opposed to hibernation or coma, and sleep deprivation is followed by longer or deeper rebound sleep.

== Necessity ==
To show the necessity of sleep, one study argues that if sleep were not essential, one would expect to find

- Animal species that do not sleep at all
- Animals that do not need recovery sleep after staying awake longer than usual
- Animals that suffer no serious consequences as a result of lack of sleep

These symptoms are not seen in complex animals, and sleep is thus considered necessary to them. Sleep helps the body and mind to feel rested. Findings show that if rats do not get any sleep, they die in a few weeks. Despite having enough food, their appetite tends to decrease resulting in weight loss and eventually death.

Outside of a few basal animals that have no brain or a very simple one, no animals have been found to date that satisfy any of these criteria. While some varieties of shark, such as great whites and hammerheads, must remain in motion at all times to move oxygenated water over their gills, it is possible they still sleep one cerebral hemisphere at a time as marine mammals do. However, it remains to be shown definitively whether any fish is capable of unihemispheric sleep.

== Invertebrates ==
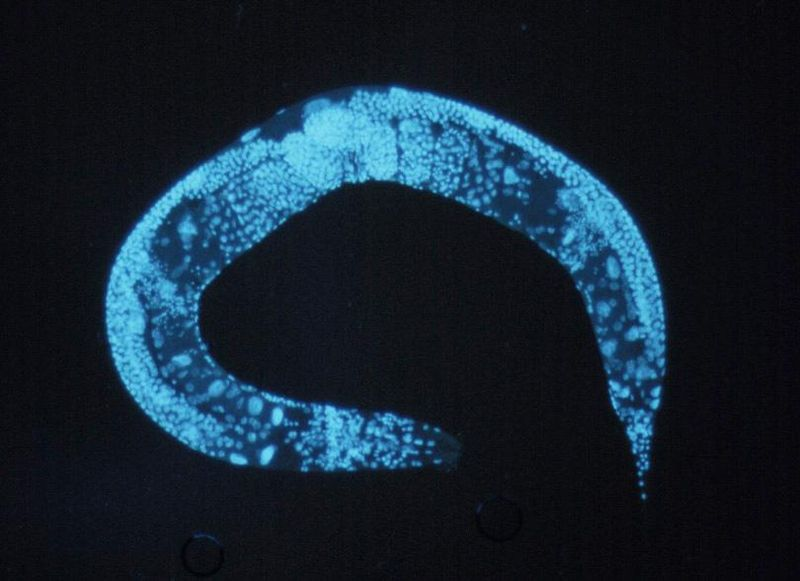
Caenorhabditis elegans is among the most primitive organisms in which sleep-like states have been observed.

The fresh-water polyp Hydra vulgaris and the jellyfish Cassiopea are among the most primitive organisms in which sleep-like states have been observed. Observing sleep states in jellyfish provides evidence that sleep states do not require that an animal have a brain or central nervous system. The nematode C. elegans is another primitive organism that appears to require sleep. Here, a lethargus phase occurs in short periods preceding each moult, a fact which may indicate that sleep primitively is connected to developmental processes. The results of Raizen et al. furthermore suggest that sleep is necessary for changes in the neural system.

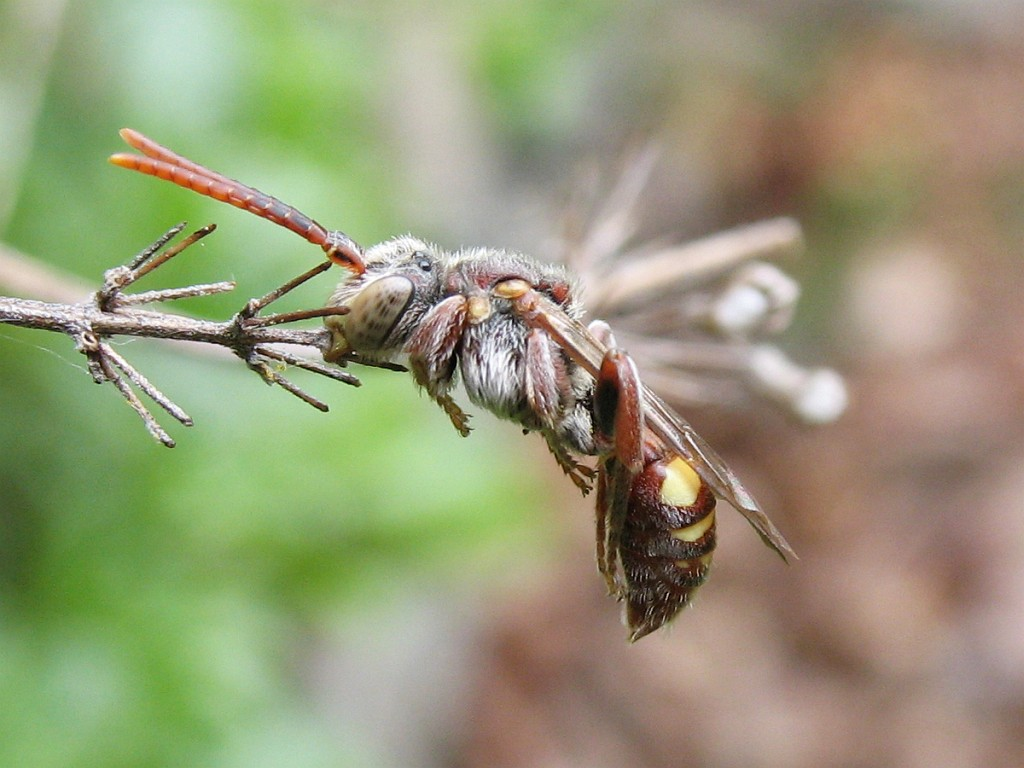
A cuckoo bee from the genus Nomada sleeping (note the cuckoo bee's characteristic position anchored by the mandibles)

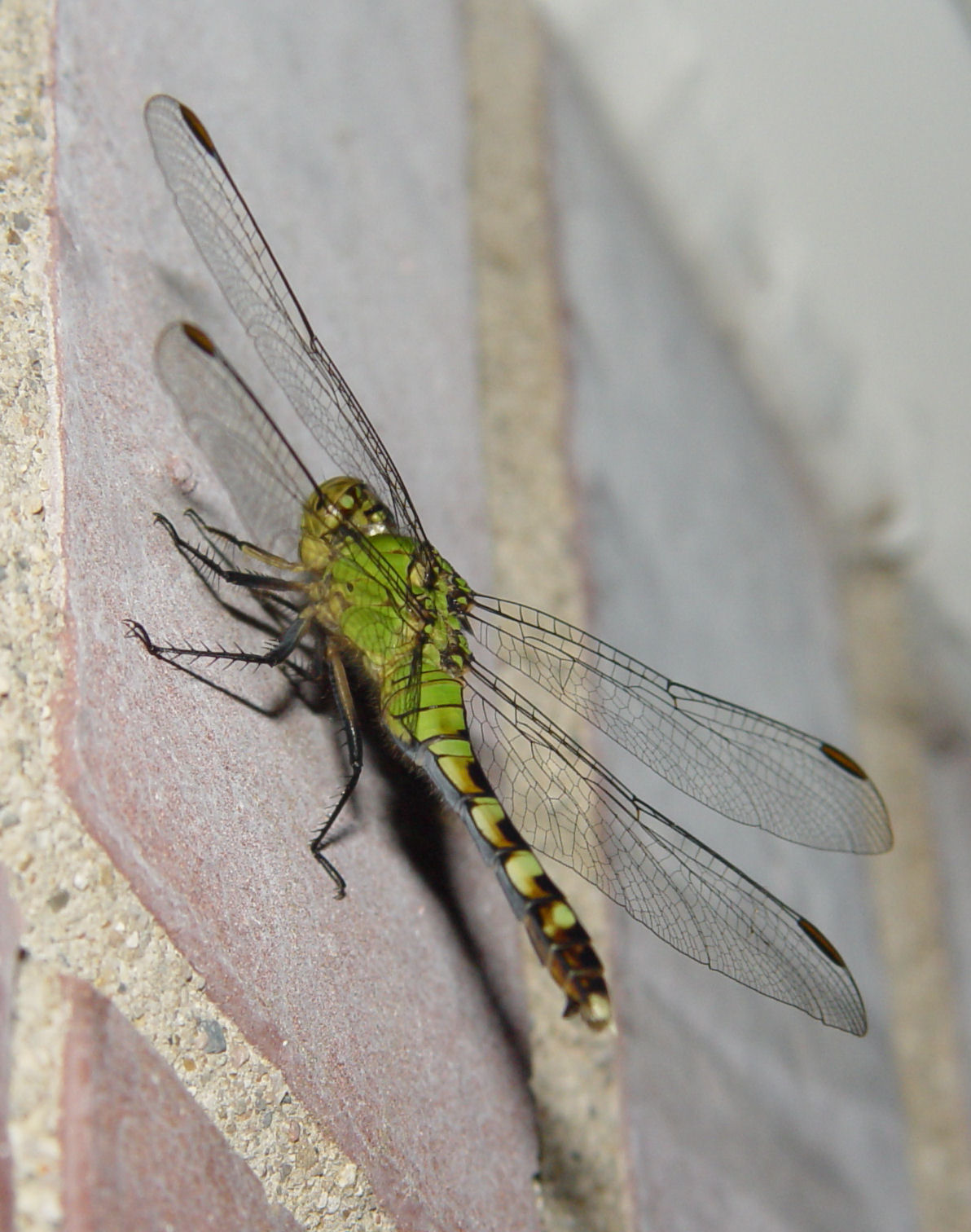
A dragonfly sleeping

Decades of research show that insects do sleep, and that this resembles mammalian and avian sleep. Nonetheless, sleep scientists continued to not accept these results and there was wide agreement that insects did not experience sleep. It took the gene expression studies showing shared lethargy-related orthology between mammals and the fruit fly Drosophila melanogaster for a conclusive understanding of sleep to be accepted.

The electrophysiological study of sleep in small invertebrates is complicated. Insects go through circadian rhythms of activity and passivity, but some do not seem to have a homeostatic sleep need. Insects do not seem to exhibit REM sleep. However, fruit flies appear to sleep, and systematic disturbance of that state leads to cognitive disabilities.

There are several methods of measuring cognitive functions in fruit flies. A common method is to let the flies choose whether they want to fly through a tunnel that leads to a light source, or through a dark tunnel. Normally, flies are attracted to light. But if sugar is placed in the end of the dark tunnel, and something the flies dislike is placed in the end of the light tunnel, the flies will eventually learn to fly towards darkness rather than light. Flies deprived of sleep require a longer time to learn this and also forget it more quickly.

If an arthropod is experimentally kept awake longer than it is used to, then its coming rest period will be prolonged. In cockroaches, that rest period is characterized by the antennae being folded down and by a decreased sensitivity to external stimuli. Sleep has been described in crayfish, too, characterized by passivity and increased thresholds for sensory stimuli as well as changes in the EEG pattern, markedly differing from the patterns found in crayfish when they are awake.

Bees have some of the most complex sleep states amongst insects. In honeybees, it has been shown that they use sleep to store long-term memories. Sleep-like state has been described in jumping spiders too, as well as regularly occurring bouts of retinal movements that suggest an REM sleep–like state. Also sleeping cuttlefish and octopuses show signs of having REM-sleep behaviors.

It is suggested that octopus also has a two-staged sleep, similar to the REM and NREM stages observed in many vertebrates. "Quiet sleep" stage usually involves behaviors such as eyes closing, flat body posture, and white-skin pattern. This stage usually lasts around 60 minutes. After the "quiet stage", the octopus moves onto an "active sleep" stage which lasts about 1 minute. In the "active sleep" stage, octopus has more eye and body movements as well as increased breathing rate. Although the octopus is suggested to have the most obvious color changing during the "active sleep" stage, a very brief and fast "color-flash" has been observed during the "quiet sleep" stage as well.

== Fish ==
Alternating phases of sleep and activity in an adult zebrafish

Sleep in fish is the subject of ongoing scientific research. Typically fish exhibit periods of inactivity, but show no significant reactions to deprivation of this condition. Some species that always live in shoals or that swim continuously (because of a need for ram ventilation of the gills, for example) are suspected never to sleep. There is also doubt about certain blind species that live in caves.

Other fish seem to sleep, however. For example, zebrafish, tilapia, tench, brown bullhead, and swell shark become motionless and unresponsive at night (or by day, in the case of the swell shark); Spanish hogfish and blue-headed wrasse can even be lifted by hand all the way to the surface without evoking a response. Studies show that some fish (for example rays and sharks) have unihemispheric sleep, which means they put half their brain to sleep while the other half still remains active and they swim while they are sleeping. A 1961 observational study of approximately 200 species in European public aquaria reported many cases of apparent sleep. On the other hand, sleep patterns are easily disrupted and may even disappear during periods of migration, spawning, and parental care.

== Land vertebrates ==
Mammals, birds and reptiles evolved from amniote ancestors, the first vertebrates with life cycles independent of water. The fact that birds and mammals are the only known animals to exhibit REM and NREM sleep indicates a common trait before divergence. However, recent evidence of REM-like sleep in fish suggests this divergence may have occurred much earlier than previously thought. Up to this point, reptiles were considered the most logical group to investigate the origins of sleep. Daytime activity in reptiles alternates between basking and short bouts of active behavior, which has significant neurological and physiological similarities to sleep states in mammals. It is proposed that REM sleep evolved from short bouts of motor activity in reptiles, while slow-wave sleep (SWS) evolved from their basking state, which shows similar slow-wave EEG patterns.

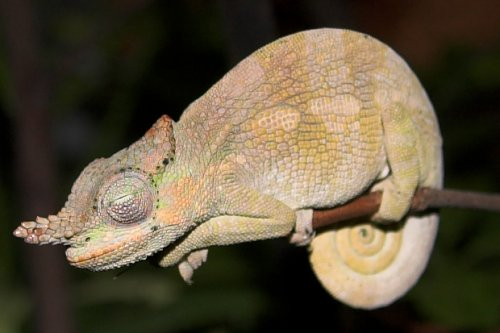
Sleeping African dwarf Fischer's chameleon

== Reptiles and amphibians ==
Reptiles have quiescent periods similar to mammalian sleep, and a decrease in electrical activity in the brain has been registered when the animals have been asleep. However, the EEG pattern in reptilian sleep differs from what is seen in mammals and other animals. In reptiles, sleep time increases following sleep deprivation, and stronger stimuli are needed to awaken the animals when they have been deprived of sleep as compared to when they have slept normally. This suggests that the sleep which follows deprivation is compensatorily deeper.

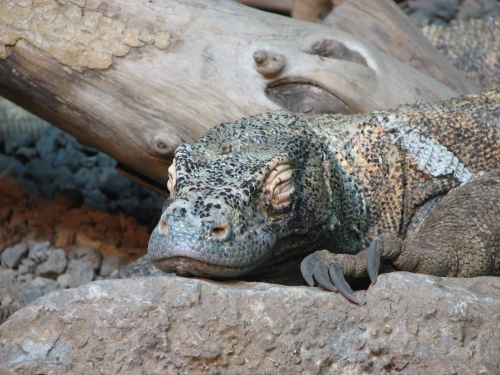
A Komodo dragon sleeping

In 2016, a study reported the existence of REM- and NREM-like sleep stages in the Central bearded dragon (Pogona vitticeps). Amphibians have periods of inactivity but show high vigilance (receptivity to potentially threatening stimuli) in this state.

Like some birds and aquatic mammals, crocodilians are also capable of unihemispheric sleep.

== Birds ==
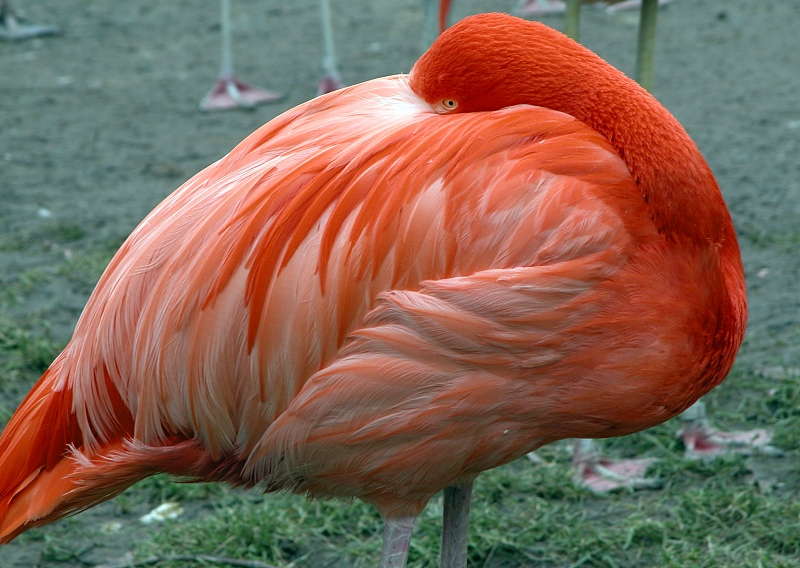
A flamingo with at least one cerebral hemisphere awake

There are significant similarities between sleep in birds and sleep in mammals, which is one of the reasons for the idea that sleep in higher animals with its division into REM and NREM sleep has evolved together with warm-bloodedness. Birds compensate for sleep loss in a manner similar to mammals, by deeper or more intense slow-wave sleep (SWS).

Birds have both REM and NREM sleep, and the EEG patterns of both have similarities to those of mammals. Different birds sleep different amounts, but the associations seen in mammals between sleep and variables such as body mass, brain mass, relative brain mass, basal metabolism and other factors (see below) are not found in birds. The only clear explanatory factor for the variations in sleep amounts for birds of different species is that birds who sleep in environments where they are exposed to predators have less deep sleep than birds sleeping in more protected environments.

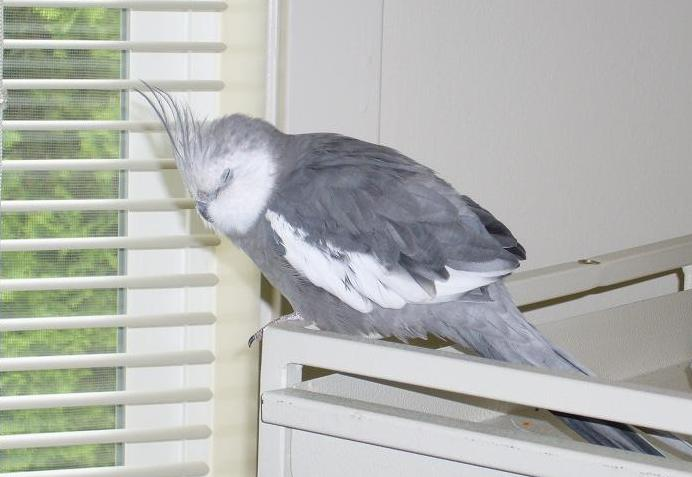
A sleeping cockatiel

Birds do not necessarily exhibit sleep debt, but a peculiarity that birds share with aquatic mammals, and possibly also with certain species of lizards (opinions differ about that last point), is the phenomenon of unihemispheric slow-wave sleep; that is, the ability to sleep with one cerebral hemisphere at a time, while keeping the other hemisphere awake. When just one hemisphere is sleeping, only the contralateral eye will be shut; that is, when the right hemisphere is asleep, the left eye will be shut, and vice versa. The distribution of sleep between the two hemispheres and the amount of unihemispheric sleep are determined both by which part of the brain has been the most active during the previous period of wake—that part will sleep the deepest—and by the level of risk of attacks from predators. Ducks near the perimeter of the flock are likely to be the ones that first will detect predator attacks. These ducks have significantly more unihemispheric sleep than those who sleep in the middle of the flock, and they react to threatening stimuli seen by the open eye.

Opinions partly differ about sleep in migratory birds. The controversy is mainly about whether they can sleep while flying or not. Theoretically, certain types of sleep could be possible while flying, but technical difficulties preclude the recording of brain activity in birds while they are flying.

== Mammals ==
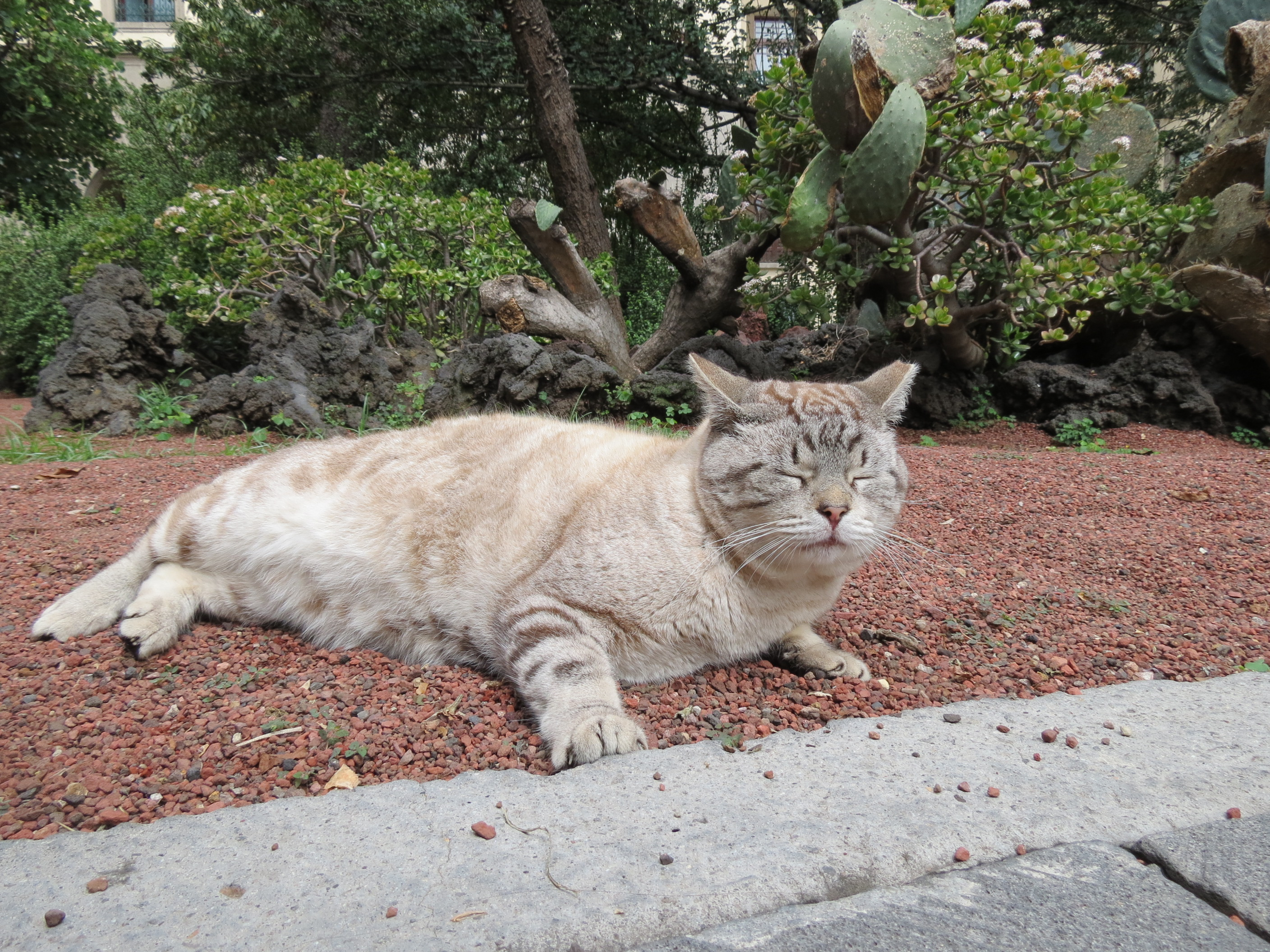
Cat sleeping

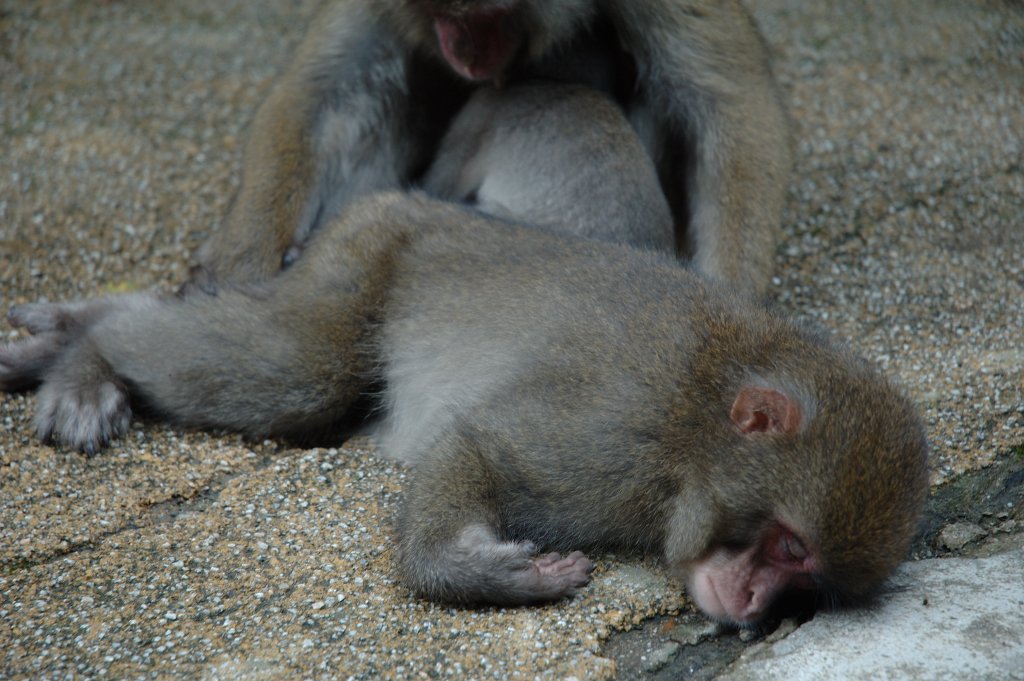
Sleeping Japanese macaques

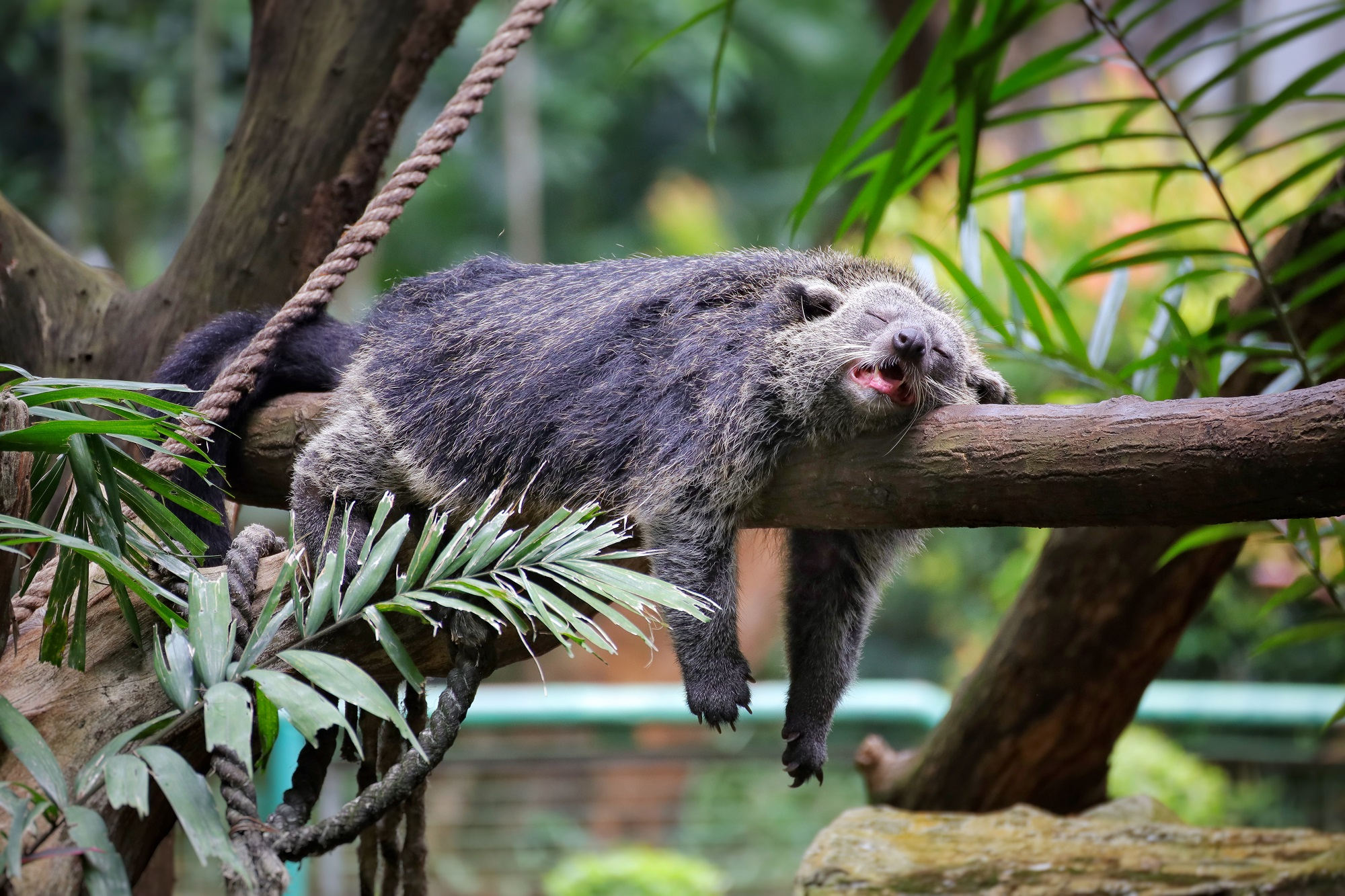
Sleeping binturong

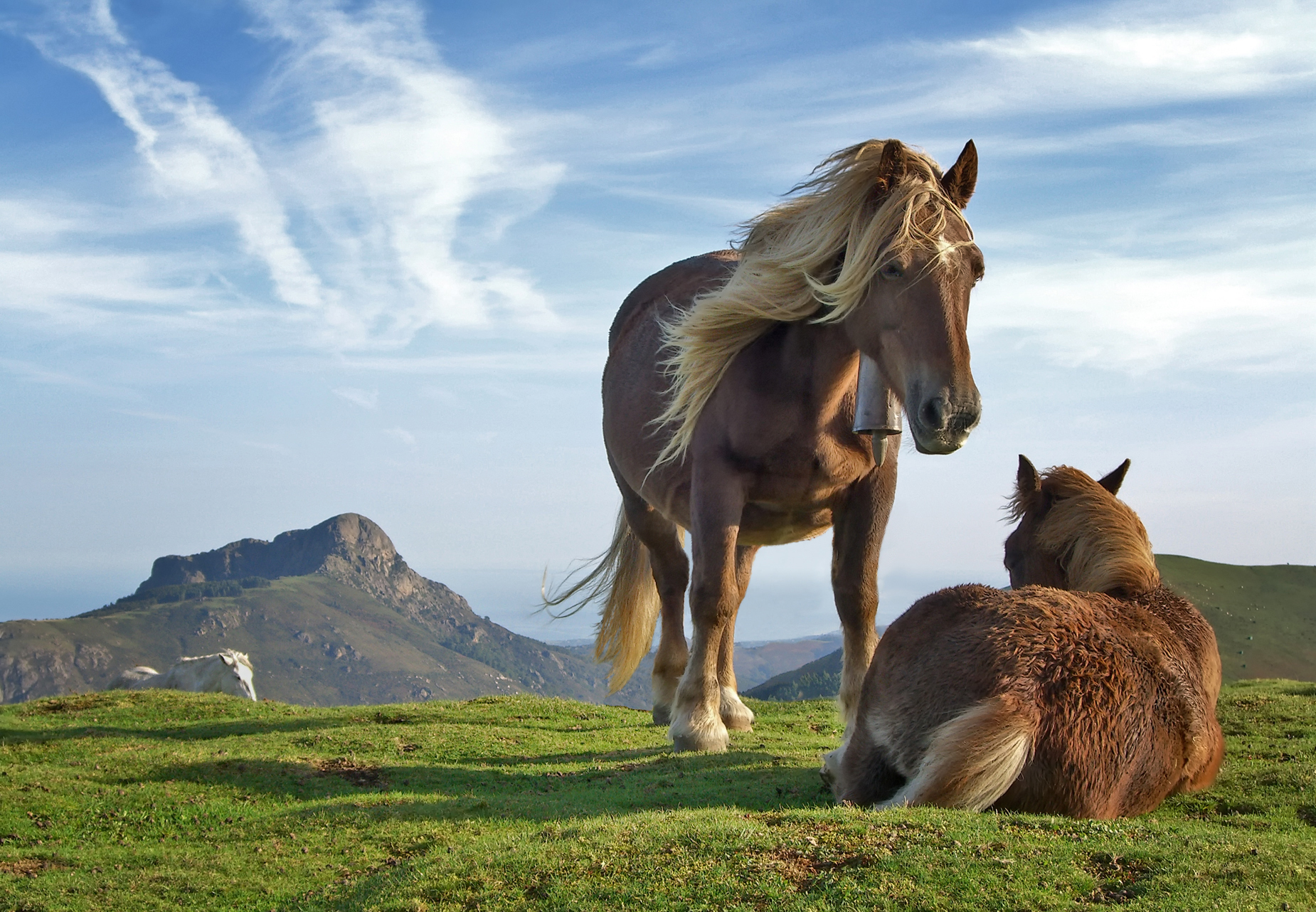
Sleeping and resting horses

Mammals have wide diversity in sleep phenomena. Generally, they go through periods of alternating non-REM and REM sleep, but these manifest differently. Horses and other herbivorous ungulates can sleep while standing, but must necessarily lie down for REM sleep (which causes muscular atony) for short periods. Giraffes, for example, only need to lie down for REM sleep for a few minutes at a time. Bats sleep while hanging upside down. Male armadillos get erections during non-REM sleep, and the inverse is true in rats. Early mammals engaged in polyphasic sleep, dividing sleep into multiple bouts per day. Higher daily sleep quotas and shorter sleep cycles in polyphasic species as compared to monophasic species, suggest that polyphasic sleep may be a less efficient means of attaining sleep's benefits. Small species with higher basal metabolic rate (BMR) may therefore have less efficient sleep patterns. It follows that the evolution of monophasic sleep may hitherto be an unknown advantage of evolving larger mammalian body sizes and therefore lower BMR.

Sleep is sometimes thought to help conserve energy, though this theory is not fully adequate as it only decreases metabolism by about 5–10%. Additionally it is observed that mammals require sleep even during the hypometabolic state of hibernation, in which circumstance it is actually a net loss of energy as the animal returns from hypothermia to euthermia in order to sleep.

Nocturnal animals have higher body temperatures, greater activity, rising serotonin, and diminishing cortisol during the night—the inverse of diurnal animals. Nocturnal and diurnal animals both have increased electrical activity in the suprachiasmatic nucleus, and corresponding secretion of melatonin from the pineal gland, at night. Nocturnal mammals, which tend to stay awake at night, have higher melatonin at night just like diurnal mammals do. And, although removing the pineal gland in many animals abolishes melatonin rhythms, it does not stop circadian rhythms altogether—though it may alter them and weaken their responsiveness to light cues. Cortisol levels in diurnal animals typically rise throughout the night, peak in the awakening hours, and diminish during the day. In diurnal animals, sleepiness increases during the night.

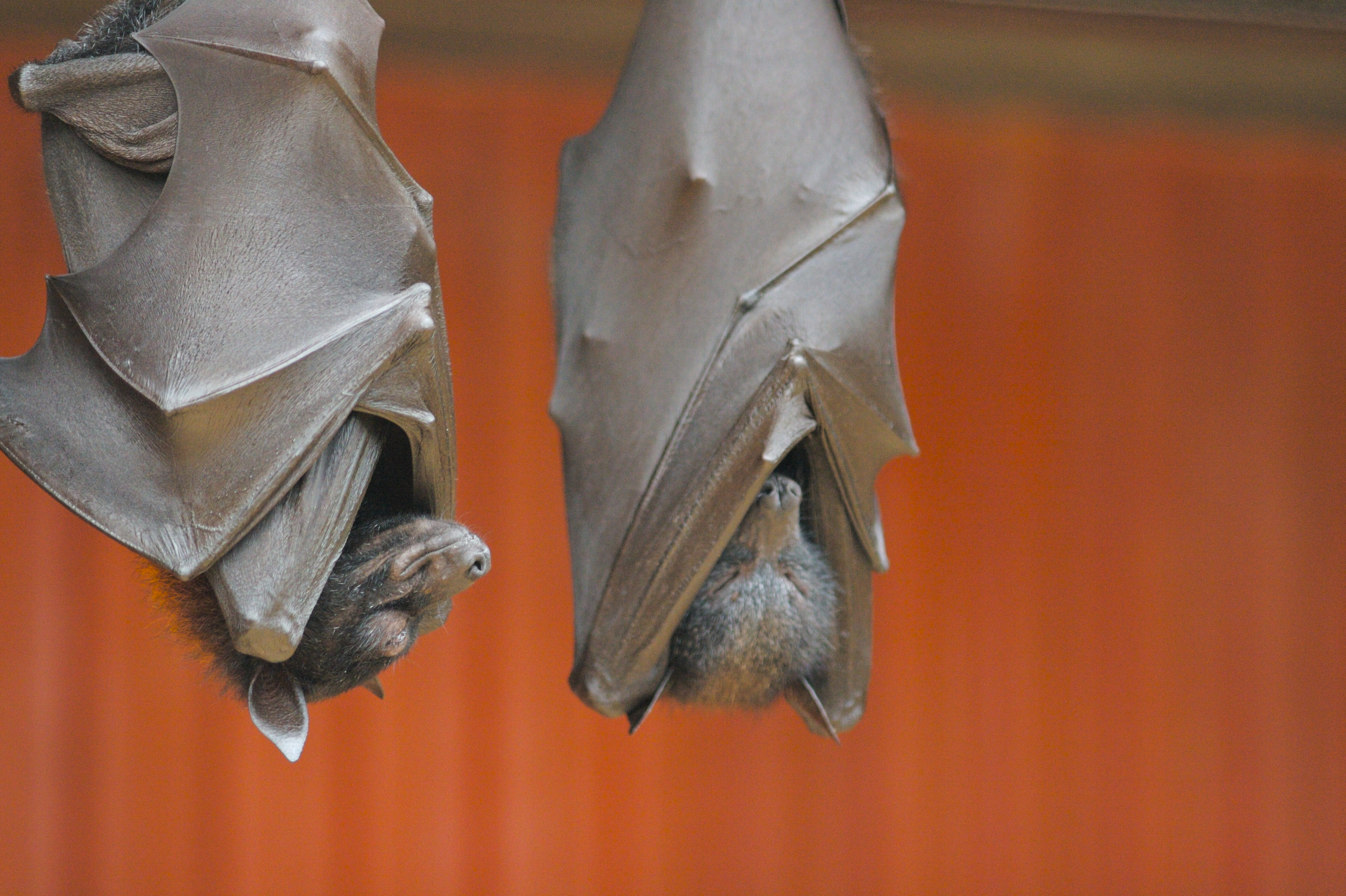
Flying foxes, asleep

=== Duration ===
Different mammals sleep different amounts. Some, such as bats, sleep 18–20 hours per day, while others, including giraffes, sleep only 3–4 hours per day. There can be big differences even between closely related species. There can also be big differences between laboratory and field studies: for example, researchers in 1983 reported that captive sloths slept nearly 16 hours a day, but in 2008, when miniature neurophysiological recorders were developed that could be affixed to wild animals, sloths in nature were found to sleep only 9.6 hours a day.

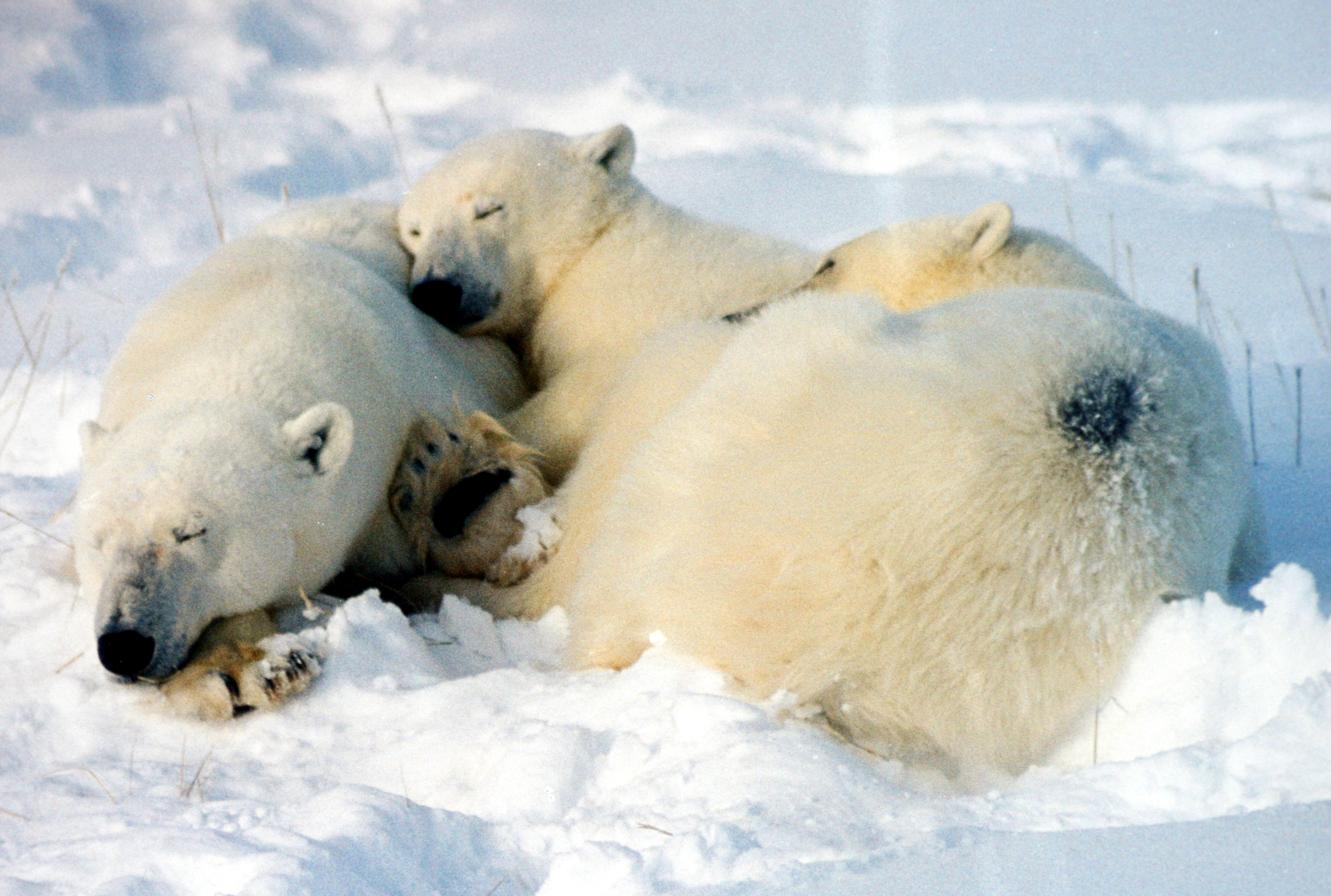
Sleeping polar bears

As with birds, the main rule for mammals (with certain exceptions, see below) is that they have two essentially different stages of sleep: REM and NREM sleep (see above). Mammals' feeding habits are associated with their sleep length. The daily need for sleep is highest in carnivores, lower in omnivores and lowest in herbivores. Humans sleep less than many other omnivores but otherwise not unusually much or unusually little in comparison with other mammals.

Many herbivores, like Ruminantia (such as cattle), spend much of their wake time in a state of drowsiness, which perhaps could partly explain their relatively low need for sleep. In herbivores, an inverse correlation is apparent between body mass and sleep length; big mammals sleep less than smaller ones. This correlation is thought to explain about 25% of the difference in sleep amount between different mammals. Also, the length of a particular sleep cycle is associated with the size of the animal; on average, bigger animals will have sleep cycles of longer durations than smaller animals. Sleep amount is also coupled to factors like basal metabolism, brain mass, and relative brain mass. The duration of sleep among species is also directly related to BMR. Rats, which have a high BMR, sleep for up to 14 hours a day, whereas elephants and giraffes, which have lower BMRs, sleep only 2–4 hours per day.

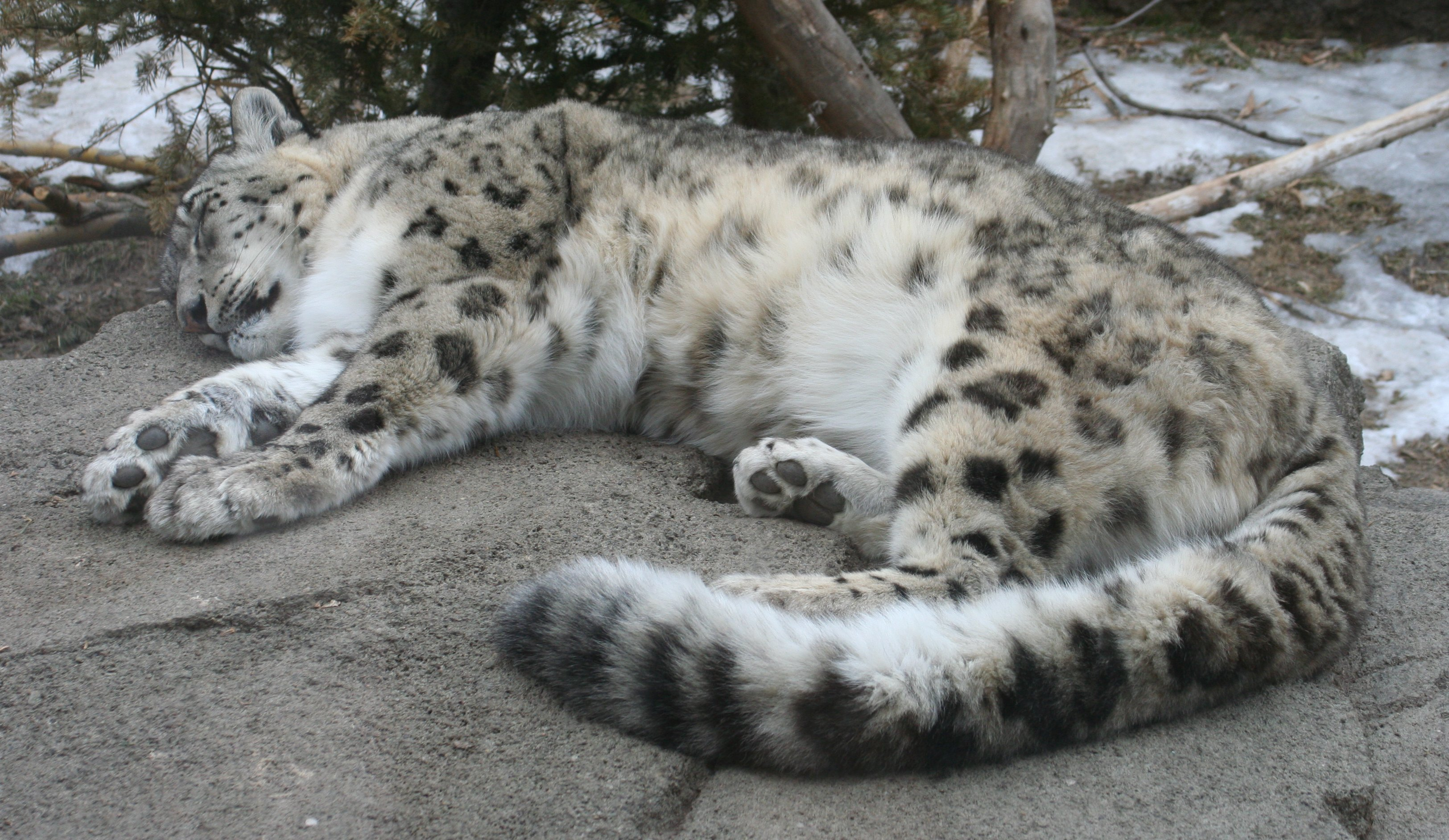
A sleeping snow leopard

It has been suggested that mammalian species which invest in longer sleep times are investing in the immune system, as species with the longer sleep times have higher white blood cell counts. Mammals born with well-developed regulatory systems, such as the horse and giraffe, tend to have less REM sleep than the species which are less developed at birth, such as cats and rats. This appears to echo the greater need for REM sleep among newborns than among adults in most mammal species. Many mammals sleep for a large proportion of each 24-hour period when they are very young. The giraffe only sleeps 2 hours a day in about 5–15 minute sessions. Koalas are the longest sleeping-mammals, about 20–22 hours a day. However, killer whales and some other dolphins do not sleep during the first month of life. Instead, young dolphins and whales frequently take rests by pressing their body next to their mother's while she swims. As the mother swims she is keeping her offspring afloat to prevent them from drowning. This allows young dolphins and whales to rest, which will help keep their immune system healthy; in turn, protecting them from illnesses. During this period, mothers often sacrifice sleep for the protection of their young from predators. However, unlike other mammals, adult dolphins and whales are able to go without sleep for a month.

Comparative average sleep periods for various mammals (in captivity) over 24 hours

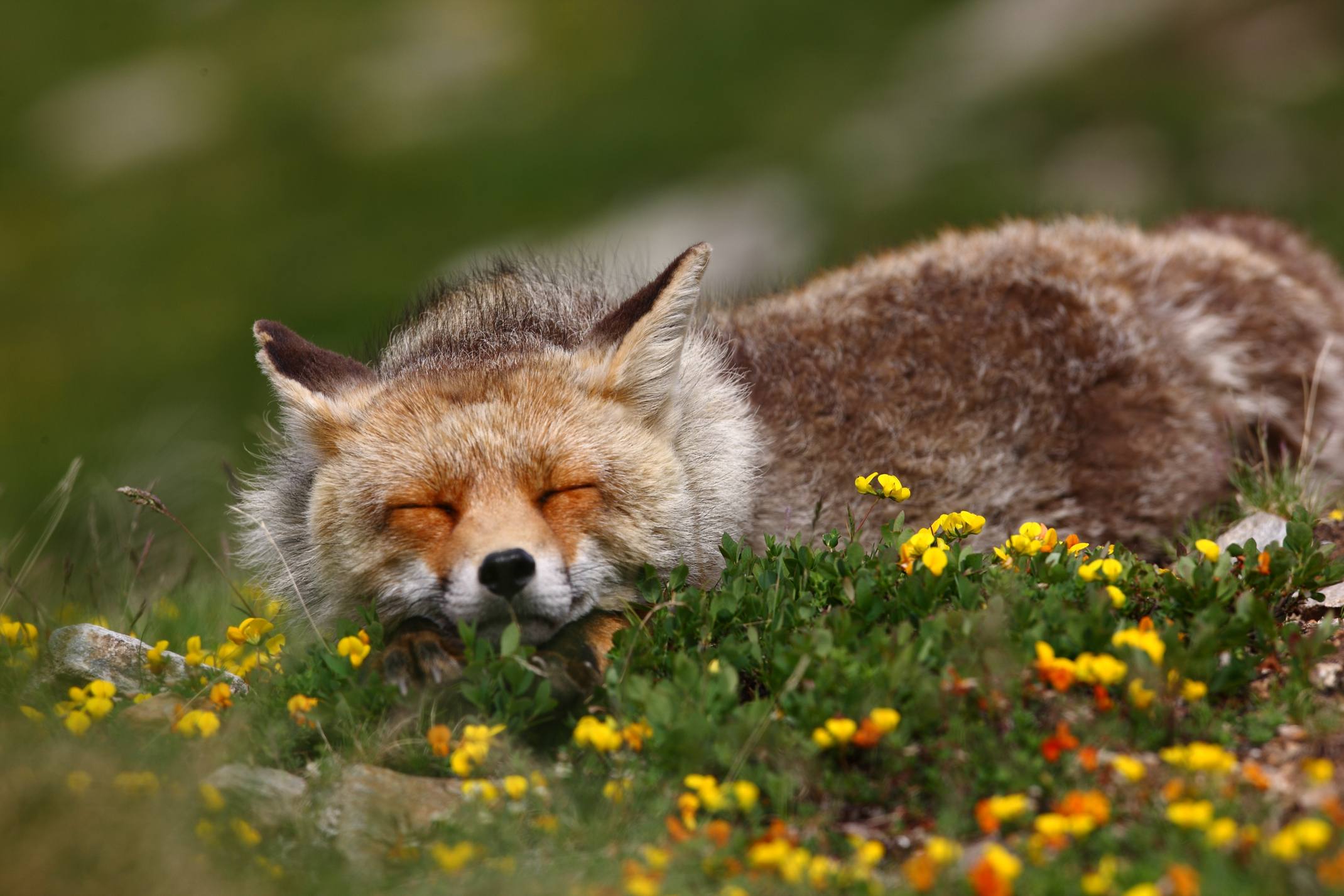
A sleeping red fox

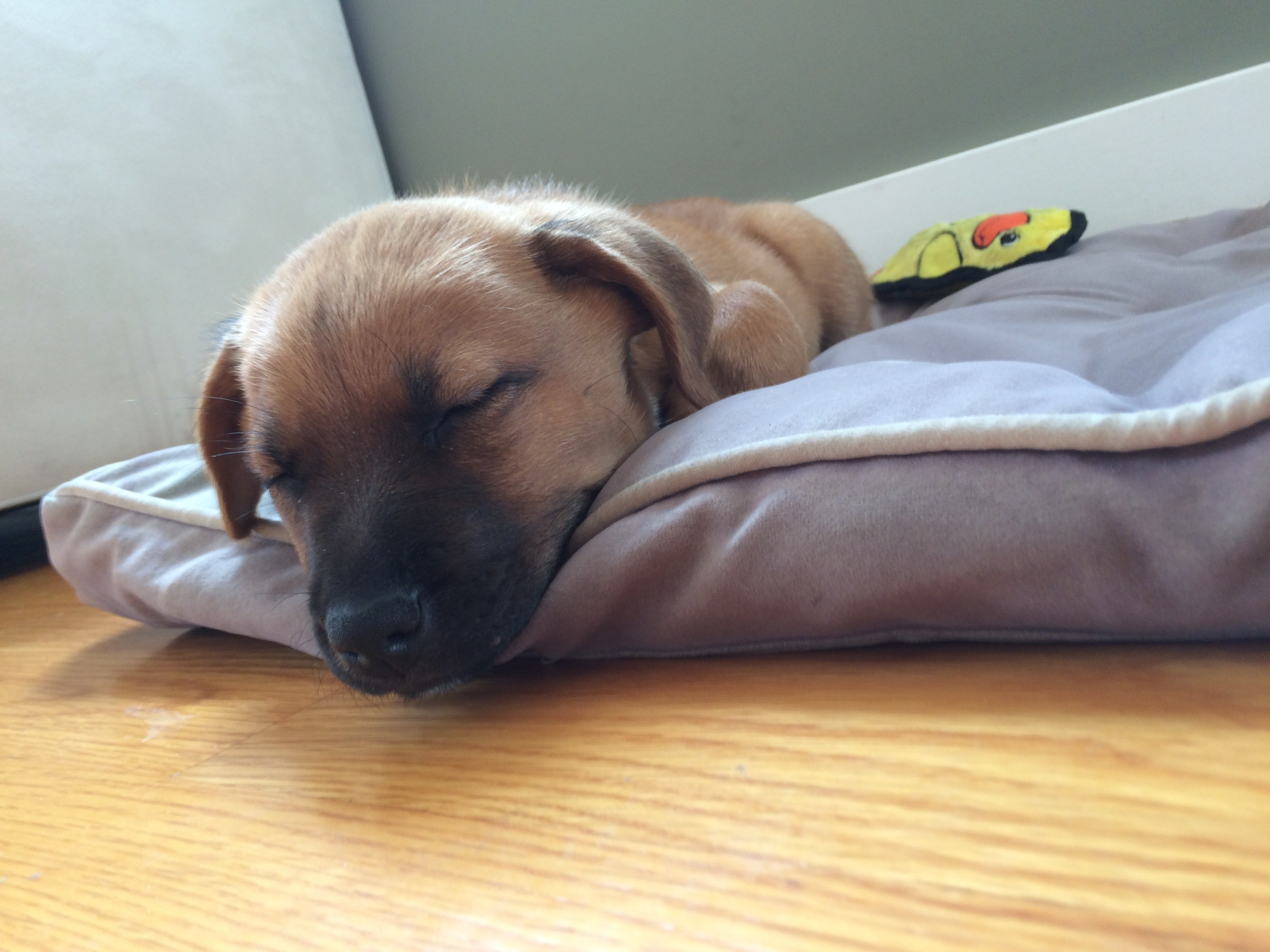
A sleeping dog

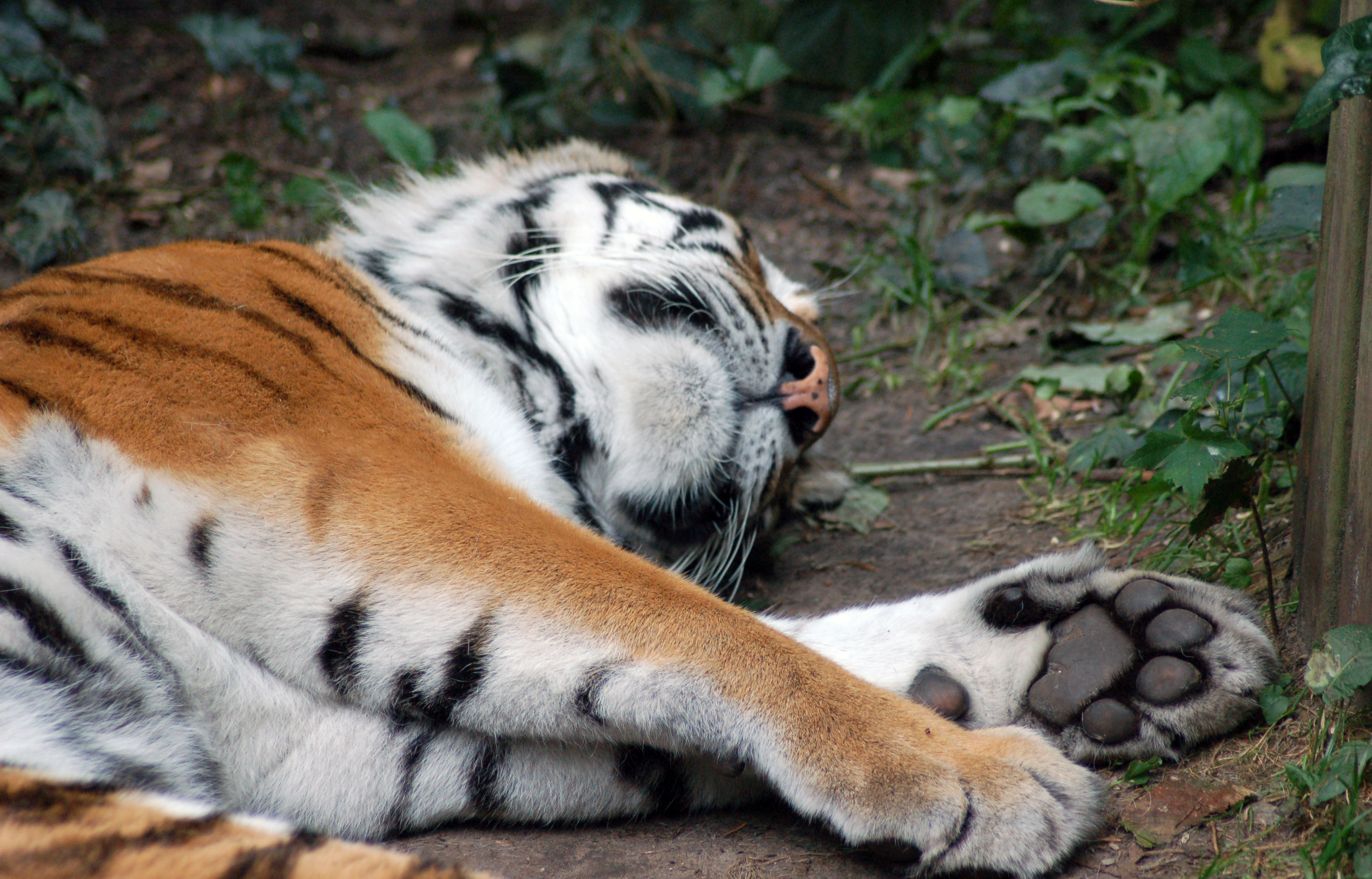
A sleeping tiger

A sleeping leopard

- Horses – 2 hours
- Elephants – 3+ hours
- Cows – 4.0 hours
- Giraffes – 4.5 hours
- Humans – 8.0 hours
- Rabbits – 8.4 hours
- Chimpanzees – 9.7 hours
- Red foxes – 9.8 hours
- Dogs – 10.1 hours
- House mice – 12.5 hours
- Cats – 12.5 hours
- Lions – 13.5 hours
- Platypuses – 14 hours
- Chipmunks – 15 hours
- Tigers – 15.8 hours
- Giant armadillos – 18.1 hours
- Leopards – 18 hours
- Little brown bats – 19.9 hours

Reasons given for the wide variations include the fact that mammals "that nap in hiding, like bats or rodents tend to have longer, deeper snoozes than those on constant alert." Lions, which have little fear of predators also have relatively long sleep periods, while elephants have to eat most of the time to support their huge bodies. Little brown bats conserve their energy except for the few hours each night when their insect prey are available, and platypuses eat a high energy crustacean diet and, therefore, probably do not need to spend as much time awake as many other mammals.

=== Rodents ===
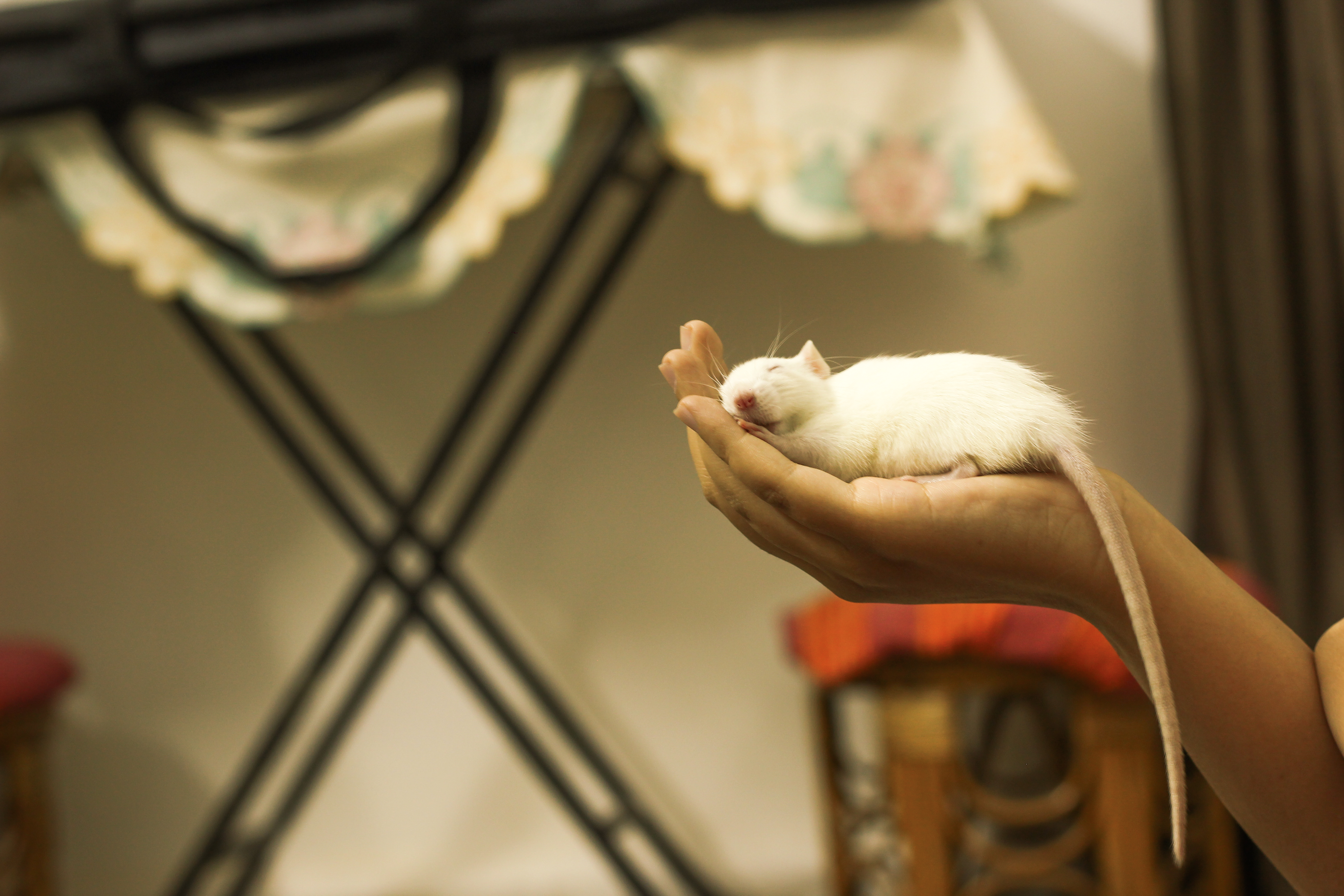
A sleeping rat

A study conducted by Datta indirectly supports the idea that memory benefits from sleep. A box was constructed wherein a single rat could move freely from one end to the other. The bottom of the box was made of a steel grate. A light would shine in the box accompanied by a sound. After a five-second delay, an electrical shock would be applied. Once the shock commenced, the rat could move to the other end of the box, ending the shock immediately. The rat could also use the five-second delay to move to the other end of the box and avoid the shock entirely. The length of the shock never exceeded five seconds. This was repeated 30 times for half the rats. The other half, the control group, was placed in the same trial, but the rats were shocked regardless of their reaction. After each of the training sessions, the rat would be placed in a recording cage for six hours of polygraphic recordings. This process was repeated for three consecutive days. During the posttrial sleep recording session, rats spent 25.47% more time in REM sleep after learning trials than after control trials.

An observation of the Datta study is that the learning group spent 180% more time in SWS than did the control group during the post-trial sleep-recording session. This study shows that after spatial exploration activity, patterns of hippocampal place cells are reactivated during SWS following the experiment. Rats were run through a linear track using rewards on either end. The rats would then be placed in the track for 30 minutes to allow them to adjust (PRE), then they ran the track with reward-based training for 30 minutes (RUN), and then they were allowed to rest for 30 minutes.

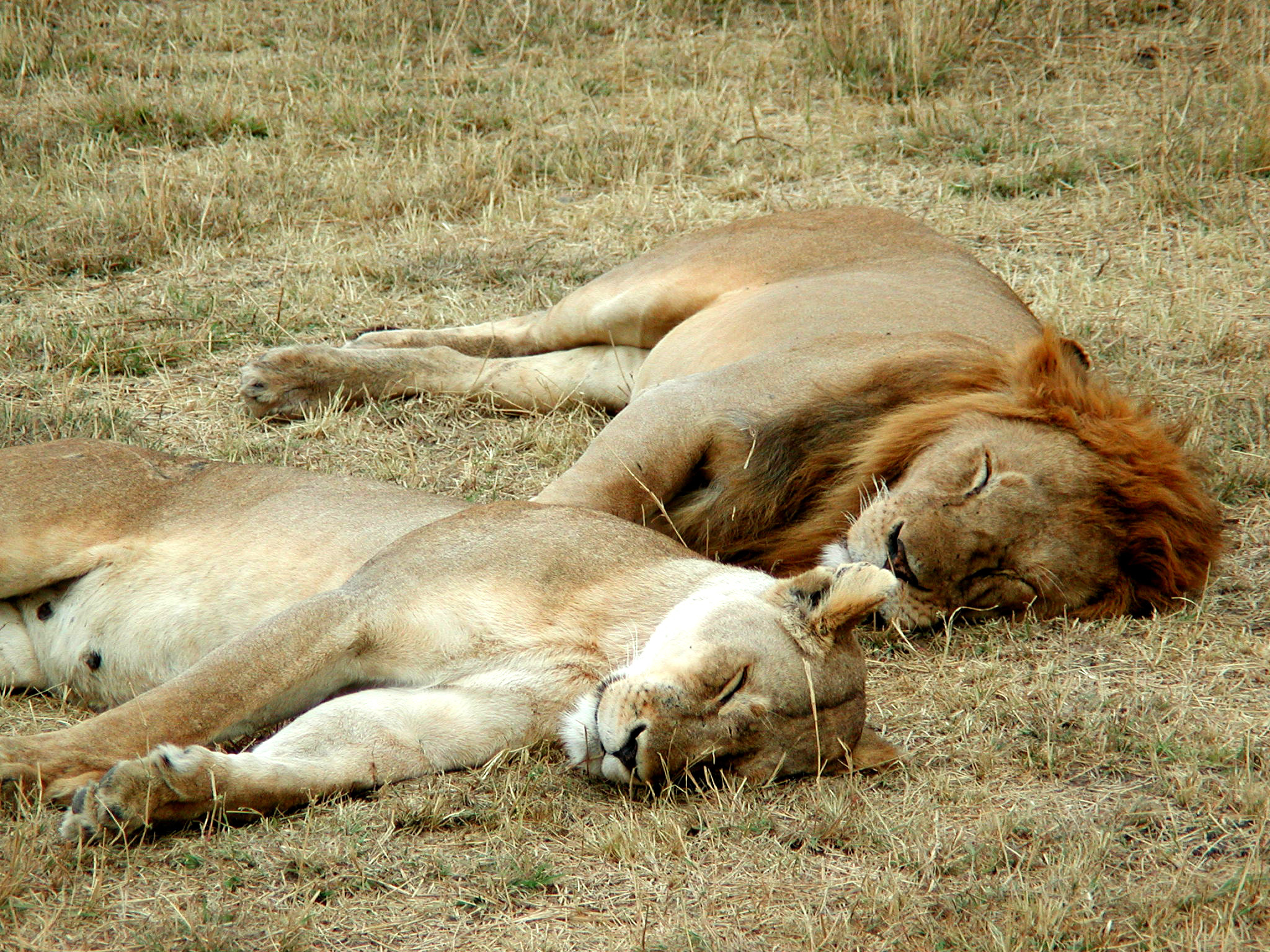
A female and male lion sleeping on a plain

During each of these three periods, EEG data were collected for information on the rats' sleep stages. The mean firing rates of hippocampal place cells during prebehavior SWS (PRE) and three ten-minute intervals in postbehavior SWS (POST) were calculated by averaging across 22 track-running sessions from seven rats. The results showed that ten minutes after the trial RUN session, there was a 12% increase in the mean firing rate of hippocampal place cells from the PRE level. After 20 minutes, the mean firing rate returned rapidly toward the PRE level. The elevated firing of hippocampal place cells during SWS after spatial exploration could explain why there were elevated levels of slow-wave sleep in Datta's study, as it also dealt with a form of spatial exploration.

In rats, sleep deprivation causes weight loss and reduced body temperature. Rats kept awake indefinitely develop skin lesions, hyperphagia, loss of body mass, hypothermia, and, eventually, fatal sepsis. Sleep deprivation also hinders the healing of burns on rats. When compared with a control group, sleep-deprived rats' blood tests indicated a 20% decrease in white blood cell count, a significant change in the immune system.

A 2014 study found that depriving mice of sleep increased cancer growth and dampened the immune system's ability to control cancers. The researchers found higher levels of M2 tumor-associated macrophages and TLR4 molecules in the sleep deprived mice and proposed this as the mechanism for increased susceptibility of the mice to cancer growth. M2 cells suppress the immune system and encourage tumour growth. TLR4 molecules are pattern recognition receptors involved in the activation of the immune system.

=== Monotremes ===
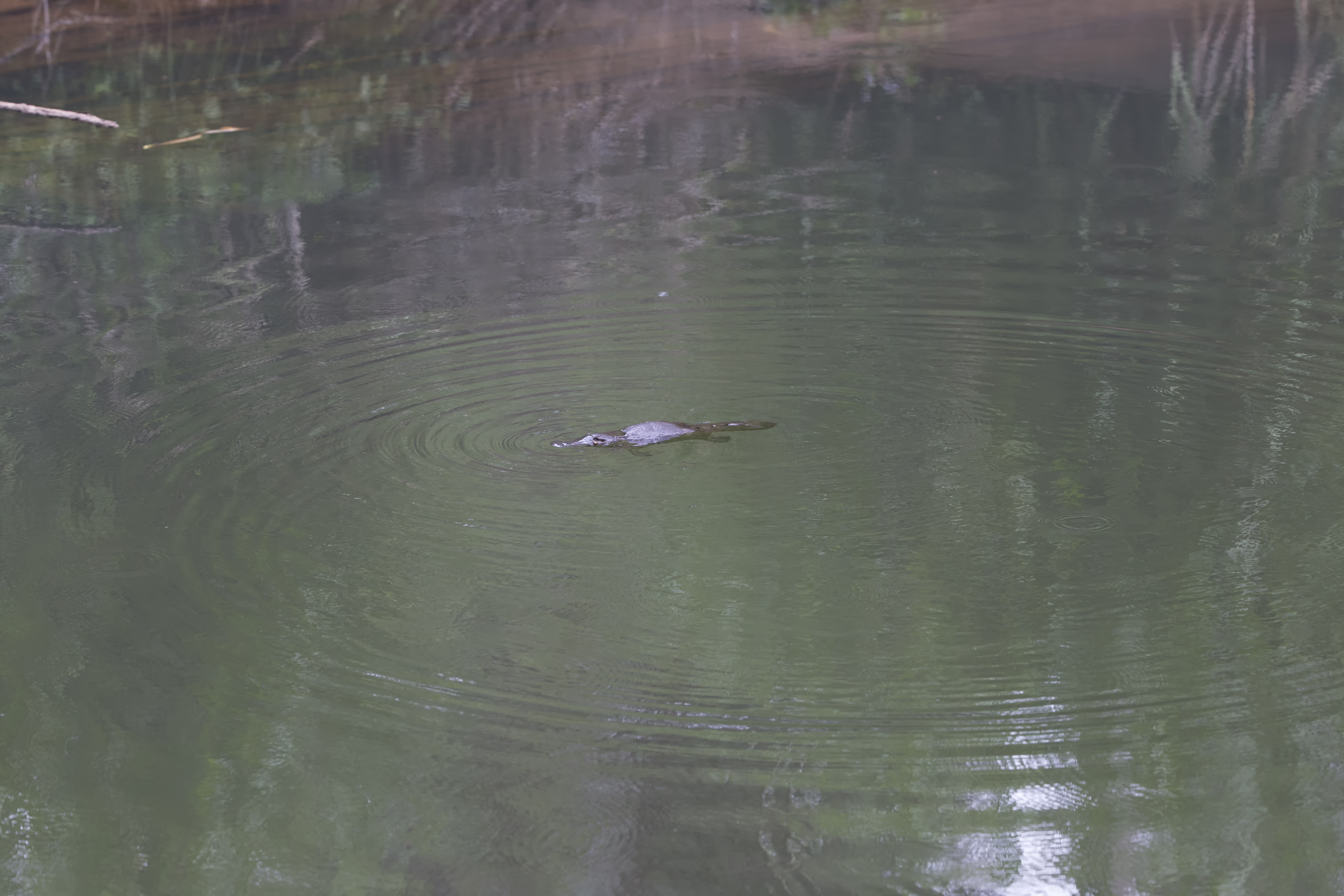
A platypus sleeping in the water before dark

Since monotremes (egg-laying mammals) are considered to represent one of the evolutionarily oldest groups of mammals, they have been subject to special interest in the study of mammalian sleep. As early studies of these animals could not find clear evidence for REM sleep, it was initially assumed that such sleep did not exist in monotremes, but developed after the monotremes branched off from the rest of the mammalian evolutionary line, and became a separate, distinct group. However, EEG recordings of the brain stem in monotremes show a firing pattern that is quite similar to the patterns seen in REM sleep in higher mammals. In fact, the largest amount of REM sleep known in any animal is found in the platypus. REM electrical activation does not extend at all to the forebrain in platypods, suggesting that they do not dream. The average sleep time of the platypus in a 24-hour period is said to be as long as 14 hours, though this may be because of their high-calorie crustacean diet.

=== Aquatic mammals ===
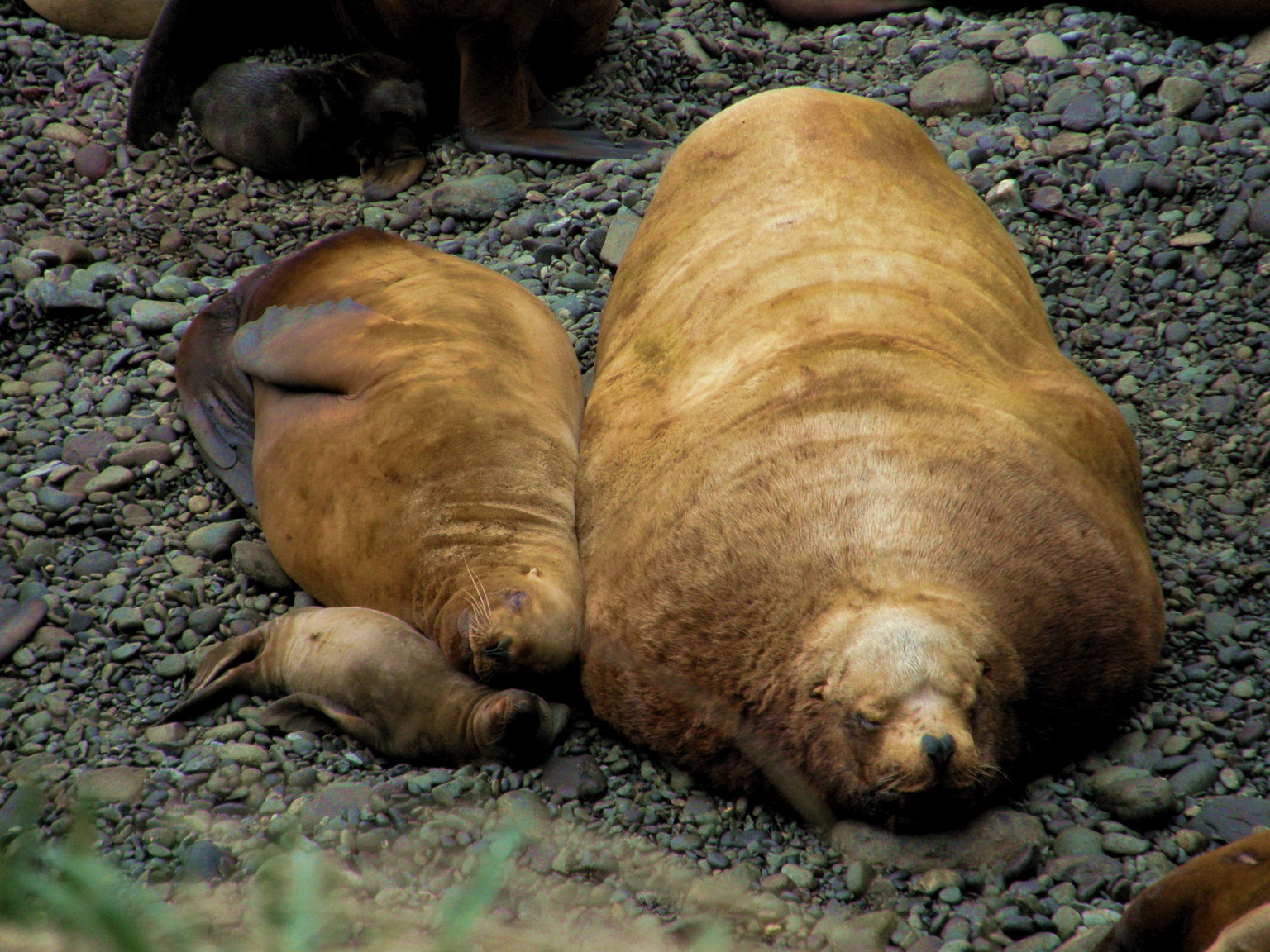
Northern sea lion pup with adult female and male, the largest of the eared seals. Habitat: the northern Pacific

The consequences of falling into a deep sleep for marine mammalian species can be suffocation and drowning, or becoming easy prey for predators. Thus, dolphins, whales, and pinnipeds (seals) engage in unihemispheric sleep while swimming, which allows one brain hemisphere to remain fully functional, while the other goes to sleep. The hemisphere that is asleep alternates, so that both hemispheres can be fully rested. Just like terrestrial mammals, pinnipeds that sleep on land fall into a deep sleep and both hemispheres of their brain shut down and are in full sleep mode. Aquatic mammal infants do not have REM sleep in infancy; REM sleep increases as they age.

Among others, seals and whales belong to the aquatic mammals. Earless seals and eared seals have solved the problem of sleeping in water via two different methods. Eared seals, like whales, show unihemispheric sleep. The sleeping half of the brain does not awaken when they surface to breathe. When one half of a seal's brain shows slow-wave sleep, the flippers and whiskers on its opposite side are immobile. While in the water, these seals have almost no REM sleep and may go a week or two without it. As soon as they move onto land they switch to bilateral REM sleep and NREM sleep comparable to land mammals, surprising researchers with their lack of "recovery sleep" after missing so much REM.

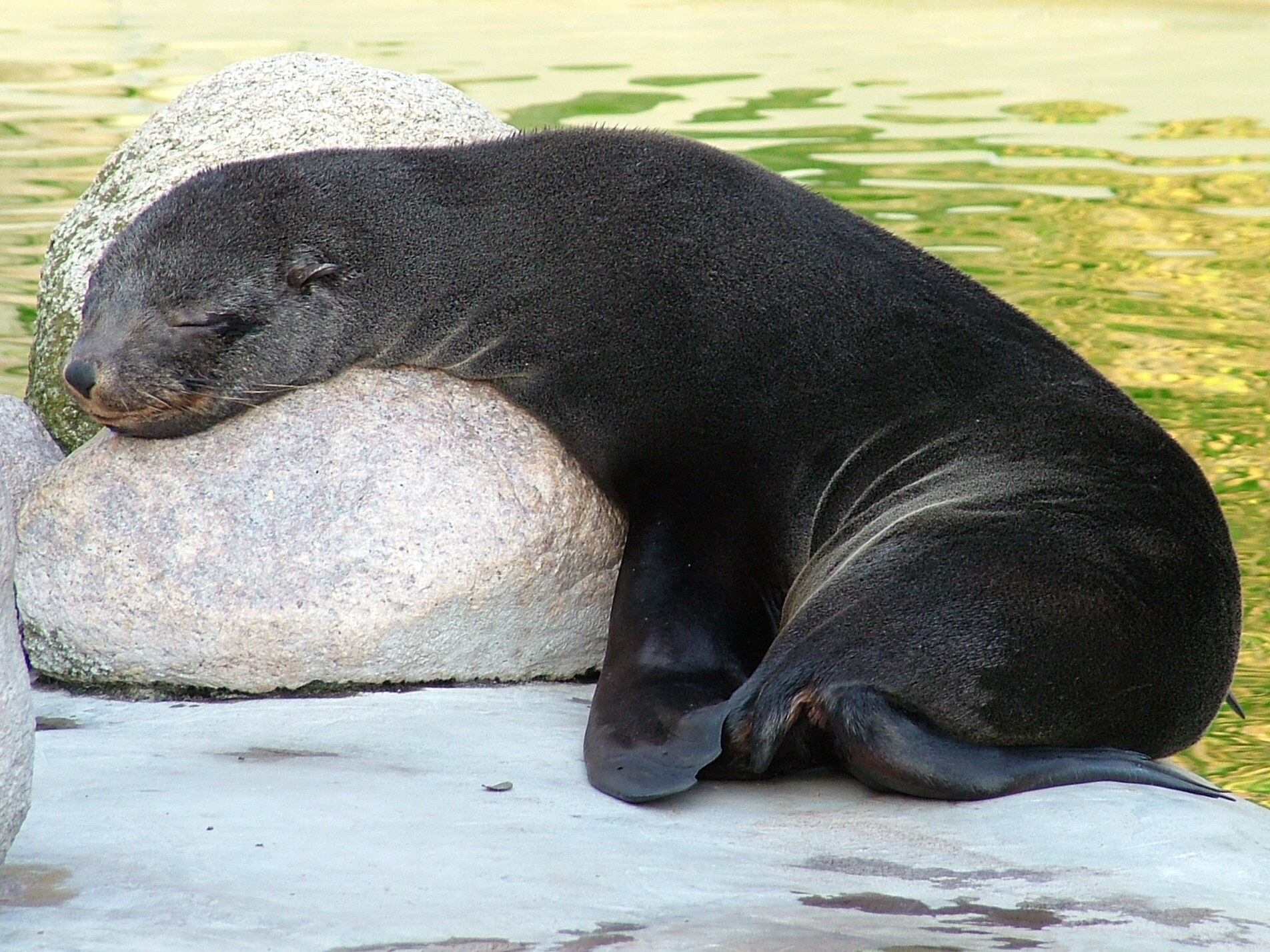
Cape fur seal, asleep in a zoo

Earless seals sleep bihemispherically like most mammals, under water, hanging at the water surface or on land. They hold their breath while sleeping under water, and wake up regularly to surface and breathe. They can also hang with their nostrils above water and in that position have REM sleep, but they do not have REM sleep underwater.

REM sleep has been observed in the pilot whale, a species of dolphin. Whales do not seem to have REM sleep, nor do they seem to have any problems because of this. One reason REM sleep might be difficult in marine settings is the fact that REM sleep causes muscular atony; that is to say, a functional paralysis of skeletal muscles that can be difficult to combine with the need to breathe regularly. Conscious breathing cetaceans sleep but cannot afford to be unconscious for long, because they may drown. While knowledge of sleep in wild cetaceans is limited, toothed cetaceans in captivity have been recorded to exhibit unihemispheric slow-wave sleep (USWS), which means they sleep with one side of their brain at a time, so that they may swim, breathe consciously and avoid both predators and social contact during their period of rest.

A 2008 study found that sperm whales sleep in vertical postures just under the surface in passive shallow 'drift-dives', generally during the day, during which whales do not respond to passing vessels unless they are in contact, leading to the suggestion that whales possibly sleep during such dives.

== Unihemispherism ==
Unihemispheric sleep refers to sleeping with only a single cerebral hemisphere. The phenomenon has been observed in birds and aquatic mammals, as well as in several reptilian species (the latter being disputed: many reptiles behave in a way which could be construed as unihemispheric sleeping, but EEG studies have given contradictory results). Reasons for the development of unihemispheric sleep are likely that it enables the sleeping animal to receive stimuli—threats, for instance—from its environment, and that it enables the animal to fly or periodically surface to breathe when immersed in water. Only NREM sleep exists unihemispherically, and there seems to exist a continuum in unihemispheric sleep regarding the differences in the hemispheres: in animals exhibiting unihemispheric sleep, conditions range from one hemisphere being in deep sleep with the other hemisphere being awake to one hemisphere sleeping lightly with the other hemisphere being awake. If one hemisphere is selectively deprived of sleep in an animal exhibiting unihemispheric sleep (one hemisphere is allowed to sleep freely but the other is awoken whenever it falls asleep), the amount of deep sleep will selectively increase in the hemisphere that was deprived of sleep when both hemispheres are allowed to sleep freely.

The neurobiological background for unihemispheric sleep is still unclear. In experiments on cats in which the connection between the left and the right halves of the brain stem has been severed, the brain hemispheres show periods of a desynchronized EEG, during which the two hemispheres can sleep independently of each other. In these cats, the state where one hemisphere slept NREM and the other was awake, as well as one hemisphere sleeping NREM with the other state sleeping REM were observed. The cats were never seen to sleep REM sleep with one hemisphere while the other hemisphere was awake. This is in accordance with the fact that REM sleep, as far as is currently known, does not occur unihemispherically.

The fact that unihemispheric sleep exists has been used as an argument for the necessity of sleep. It appears that no animal has developed an ability to go without sleep altogether.

== Hibernation ==
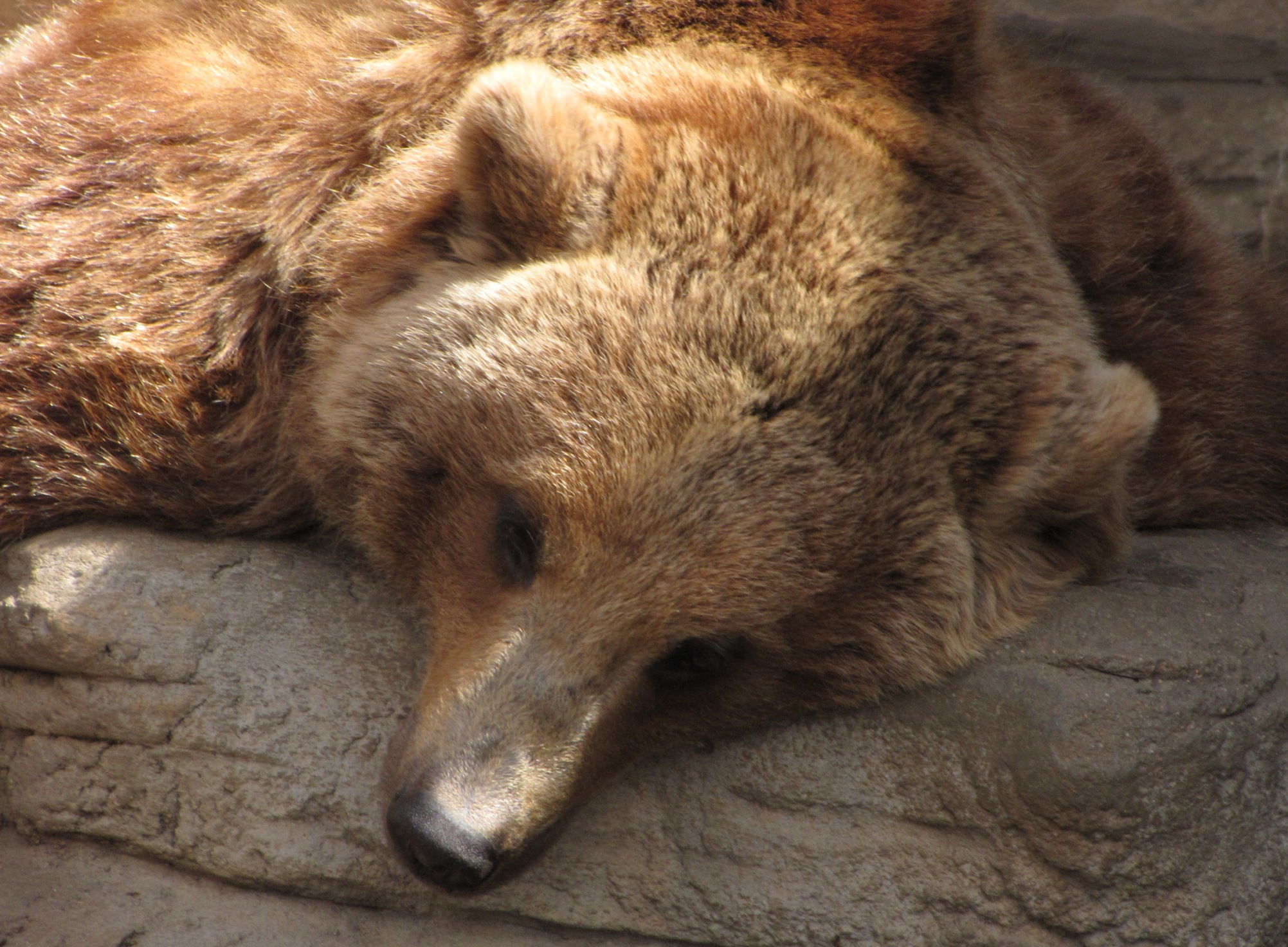
Sleeping grizzly bear

Animals that hibernate are in a state of torpor, differing from sleep. Hibernation markedly reduces the need for sleep, but does not remove it. Some hibernating animals end their hibernation a couple of times during the winter so that they can sleep. Hibernating animals waking up from hibernation often go into rebound sleep because of lack of sleep during the hibernation period. They are definitely well-rested and are conserving energy during hibernation, but need sleep for something else.
