= In Concert (iamamiwhoami album) =

Live album by iamamiwhoami
- Released: 4 December 2010
- Recorded: November 2010
- Venue: Handen, Sweden
- Length: 64:10
- Label: To whom it may concern.
- Director: Robin Kempe-Bergman
- Producer: Claes Björklund

Iamamiwhoami chronology
In Concert (2010)	Kin (2012)

Singles from In Concert
- 1. "." Released: 4 December 2010

Film cover
- 2016/2017 release

In Concert (stylised in all caps) is the first live audiovisual performance installation by Swedish audiovisual project iamamiwhoami, and also their first full-length release. The performance video was streamed on the website of the project's independent label, To whom it may concern., on 16 November 2010, and released as a digital album on 4 December, the same year, the project's one-year anniversary. For the project's seven-year anniversary, in 2016, the film was made available for download and streaming, and released on DVD on 17 April 2017.

The one-hour performance takes place in Handen, Sweden, with a single attendee chosen by followers to represent the audience.

== Background ==
Two months since the release of "y", the seventh episode from the Bounty audiovisual series and album, a video requesting a volunteer was uploaded to iamamiwhomami's channel on 1 October 2010. Although not the first message delivered to someone, this was the first time the project addressed the audience directly. At the time, no official confirmation regarding who was behind the act, the internet's speculation already had a name for the woman in the videos, Swedish singer-songwriter Jonna Lee. Following the cryptic nature of the project, the video instructed viewers to choose their "representative" by 8 October, with full name, phone number, and address, with no explanation of the purpose. This resulted in fans choosing YouTube user tehhils, who had to decline claiming difficulties to obtain a passport and suggested to pass on the task to German user ShootUpTheStation. "SUTS", as the audience called him for short, would later join the label's creative team, as graphic designer Jan Scharlau. Subsequently, a video documenting a phone call made by Jonna Lee to the volunteer was uploaded on 9 November, where she interviews him with questions about things like health, phobias, habits, and beliefs, ending with "we will pick you up to the airport" and requesting him to "film [his] entire journey". A series of six short videos from ShootUpTheStation's camera were uploaded from 12 to 15 November, in which he documented his journey and his stay at a hotel where multiple visitors would come in to deliver a lesson.

On 15 November 2010, a concert was finally announced to take place the following day, on a video titled "http://towhomitmayconcern.cc/", which became the label's website and store later on.

== Performance ==
Set list
- 1. "u-1" 2. "b" 3. Interlude: "Prelude 699130082.451322-5.4.21.3.1.20.9.15.14.1.12"; 4. "t" 5. Interlude: "20101001"; 6. "n" 7. "o" 8. Interlude: "13.1.14.4.18.1.7.15.18.1.1110"; 9. "u-2" 10. Interlude: "15.6.6.9.3.9.14.1.18.21.13.56155"; 11. "y" 12. "9.20.19.13.5.723378"; 13. "."

The performance consist of the seven Bounty songs released in 2010, the third prelude "9.20.19.13.5.723378", and a full version of a song previewed on the video uploaded on 4 November 2010. Other preludes and music from the promos leading to the concert served as interludes for the performance.

It begins with a point-of-view shot of Scharlau following Lee out of the hotel at night, and then both board a white Volvo 240. A man in a black balaclava, assumed to be Claes Björklund, drives, with Lee sitting in the front seat next to him, and Scharlau in the backseat. The camera lingers over figures matching the animals from the prelude series, and music instruments. After five minutes of no interaction and silence, Lee sings "u-1" a cappella, and then stays silent until the car finally arrives at the concert site. Then the view switches to an exterior shot of the parked car. Still in the car, Lee starts playing "b" in a synthesizer, and then exits to continue the song at the trunk of the car, where masked Björklund is also performing. Once they finish the song, Lee invites Scharlau out of the car and leads him to some barricades. An interlude plays in the background, as the walk the path between the barricades. As they reach the end of the path, Lee crosses to the other side and starts performing "t".

== Release ==
The concert video installation began streaming at approximately 00:15 CET on 16 November 2010, on the label's website, lasting 64 minutes and was available to be viewed for three additional hours on the site. The project went inactive after this, until it was released as a single-track album on digital stores and streaming platforms on 4 December 2010, coinciding with the audiovisual group's one-year anniversary. Along with the album release, singles for some songs from the performance were made available: "b", "t", "n", "o", "u-2", "y", and "." (pronounced "punkt"; "period" in Swedish). In 2013, the album and its singles were pulled from all retailers.

Again, for the project's seventh anniversary on 4 December 2016, the film was released for download and on-demand streaming, followed by a DVD edition on 10 April 2017. These film digital and physical editions have a new artwork designed by Jacob Hulmston. The album has not been reissued on any format and remains unavailable.

The song premiered on this release as "." received a studio version released in 2014 as "Shadowshow" on the album Blue. "9.20.19.13.5.723378" got a full version released as "Like Hell", on Jonna Lee's 2018 solo album Everyone Afraid to Be Forgotten.

== Track listing ==
All lyrics are written by Jonna Lee; all music is composed by Jonna Lee and Claes Björklund.

No.	Title	Length
1.	"In Concert"	64:10

== Personnel ==
=== Music ===
- Jonna Lee – composition, lyrics, vocals, instruments, mixing
- Claes Björklund – composition, instruments, mastering

=== Film ===
- Robin Kempe-Bergman – direction
- John Strandh – cinematography
- Björn Baumann – sound
- Agustín Moreaux – production design, styling, costumes
- Klara Bjärkstedt – costumes
- Jonna Lee – executive production

=== Artwork ===
- Jacob Hulmston – graphic design (2016/2017 film release), cover art (2016/2017 film release)

== Release history ==
Date	Label	Release	Format
16 November 2010	To whom it may concern.	Film	Streaming
4 December 2010	To whom it may concern.	Album	Download; streaming
4 December 2016	To whom it may concern.	Film	Download; streaming
10 April 2017	To whom it may concern.	Film	DVD
