= Visual album =

Type of concept album

A visual album is a type of concept album in which the album is accompanied by a feature-length film or individual music videos for every song. Usually, the film, or "visuals", emphasize the album's overall theme and serve as the "visual vehicle" that enhances the experience.

Though music films and videos accompanying albums are not new in popular culture, the term achieved prominence in modern usage after the release of American singer-songwriter Beyoncé's 2013 self-titled album. Prior to Beyoncé, she had also released music videos for thirteen tracks from her second studio album B'Day (2006); all videos were included in B'Day Anthology Video Album (2007). Jonna Lee's project iamamiwhoami is said to have been promoting the "audio-visual album" format since 2009, and the band Animal Collective had similarly earlier described their experimental 2010 album ODDSAC as a "visual record".

== Definitions ==
The definition of what constitutes a visual album remains a subject of debate. Being a largely experimental medium, its execution varies from artist to artist. According to Screen Rant's Megan Summers, "visual albums are linked music videos or films released in conjunction with a record". In one of the first articles written about the artform, Landon Palmer of Film School Rejects notes that "visual albums stage, sometimes with interruptions, the majority of a musician or band’s LP ... cohesive works of musical artistry rather than conveniently divisible bits of audio information". According to Judy Berman of Pitchfork, visual albums result from the "synergistic connection between music and cinema that dates back to the latter art form’s birth". While films like Purple Rain and A Hard Day's Night are classics that combine music and long-form visuals, Kylie Lynne of AllMusic argues that such films "had the corresponding album as a soundtrack with the majority of focus on the storyline and dialogue when the music was not playing", separating them from visual albums in which the music is the primary audio component.

== History and development ==
=== Pre-MTV era ===
The synergy between music and cinema has existed since cinema's early history, with the first talkie in 1927, The Jazz Singer, being a musical. When it became clear that talkies were to become the dominant form of cinema, there was a significant rise in musicians making use of the visual medium to bring their music to new audiences. Artists like Bessie Smith and Fred Astaire took advantage of this and appeared on television performing their songs. Soon enough, the music film as a concept would become a cultural phenomenon in 1964, at the height of Beatlemania, when the Beatles released A Hard Day's Night. The following decade saw a massive leap in the music industry's use of visual media, with Blondie's Eat to the Beat, released in 1979, being the first album in the rock era to be accompanied by videos for every song.

=== MTV era and the longform film ===
The rise of MTV and the popularity of Michael Jackson in the 1980s cemented the status of music videos as integral to the music industry. Jackson would eventually stretch his cinematic ambitions to feature-film length with 1988's Moonwalker, just as Prince had done four years earlier with Purple Rain. In 1985, Rita Lee portrayed tragicomic characters in a narrative superproduction for a TV Globo year-end special to promote her album Rita e Roberto. For Pete Townshend's album White City: A Novel was a film based on the album, directed and "adapted for longform video" by Richard Lowenstein. Janet Jackson also released a similar form of visual album with her Rhythm Nation 1814 film short in 1989. In 1986, British band The The made music videos for each track to promote their album Infected. The French electronic band Daft Punk collaborated with Toei Animation to produce Interstella 5555: The 5tory of the 5ecret 5tar 5ystem, a feature-length anime film using their 2001 album Discovery as its soundtrack. Lemon Jelly's 2005 album '64-'95 and Beck's 2006 album The Information were both released with videos for each track. Beyoncé's B'Day Anthology Video Album marked another significant release in this era, which companioned the deluxe edition of 2006's B'Day and featured videos for every song.

=== Streaming era ===
The beginning of the streaming era offered artists several options of making their musical projects easily accessible to fans. The Swedish electropop group iamamiwhoami published a series of music videos in 2010. Described as an audiovisual project, it was later released on their "audiovisual album" Bounty. The band continued the tradition, releasing Kin in 2012, Blue in 2014, and their subsequent albums in an audiovisual format. R.E.M.'s final studio album, 2011's Collapse into Now also featured at least one music video for every song, spearheaded by vocalist Michael Stipe.

The next instance of a visual album was Beyoncé's 2013 eponymous release. Having started recording the album in the summer of 2012, she had the idea to make it a visual album in early 2013 and hence began filming videos for every song secretly across the globe as she embarked on The Mrs. Carter Show World Tour. The album, having had no prior announcement or promotion, was then released as a complete surprise in the early hours of December 13, 2013. Unlike B'day's year-long wait for a complete visual companion in 2007, Beyoncé and its 17 videos were made available exclusively through the iTunes Store immediately upon release. The music and videos were "designed to be consumed as a comprehensive audio/visual piece".

“Lemonade” draws from the prolific literary, musical, cinematic, and aesthetic sensibilities of black cultural producers to create a rich tapestry of poetic innovation. The audacity of its reach and fierceness of its vision challenges our cultural imagination, while crafting a stunning and sublime masterpiece about the lives of women of color and the bonds of friendship seldom seen or heard in American popular culture.

— Peabody Entertainment Awards on "Lemonade"

Beyoncé would reinvent the visual album format again with her following studio album Lemonade in 2016. Instead of filming separate videos for every song, she opted to create an hour-long feature film to companion the album. Releasing a cryptic trailer 6 days before the film's exclusive premiere on HBO, Lemonade was described as a "world premiere event". The project's true purpose as a companion film for Beyoncé's sixth studio album was revealed on April 23, 2016 as the film premiered. The film has since exclusively streamed on Tidal. It was nominated for four Primetime Emmy Awards and won a Peabody Award for its "contributions to the greater cultural landscape."

The third studio album by the English musician Thom Yorke, Anima, was released on 27 June 2019 in conjunction with a 15-minute visual album of the same name on Netflix. Ed Sheeran's sixth studio album, - ("Subtract"), was released on 5 May 2023 with music videos for every song.

Other artists like Frank Ocean, Kanye West, Kacey Musgraves, Solange, Halsey, Melanie Martinez, Twenty One Pilots, Travis Scott and Sia have all released projects described as visual albums to different streaming services. Though the films often accompany the albums, the visuals are at times released at a later date, as in the case of Black Is King (2020), the visual accompaniment to Beyoncé's The Lion King: The Gift (2019).

== See also ==
- Concept album
- Leitmotif
