= Everyone Afraid to Be Forgotten =

Studio album by ionnalee
- Released: 16 February 2018
- Recorded: 2015–2017
- Genre: Synth-pop
- Length: 65:36
- Label: To whom it may concern.
- Producers: Jonna Lee; Barbelle; TR/ST

ionnalee chronology
This Is Jonna Lee (2009)	Everyone Afraid to Be Forgotten (2018)	Remember the Future (2019)

Singles from Everyone Afraid to Be Forgotten
- 1. "Samaritan" Released: 10 March 2017; 2. "Not Human" Released: 2 June 2017; 3. "Simmer Down" Released: 6 October 2017; 4. "Gone" Released: 24 November 2017; 5. "Dunes of Sand" Released: 19 January 2018; 6. "Joy" Released: 2 February 2018; 7. "Work" Released: 9 February 2018

Everyone Afraid to Be Forgotten (stylised in all caps) is the third studio album by Swedish singer Jonna Lee. It is her first album under the moniker ionnalee. The album was released on 16 February 2018 via Lee's own record label To whom it may concern. and distributed by Kobalt. It was preceded by seven singles that were released throughout 2017 and early 2018: "Samaritan", "Not Human", "Simmer Down", "Gone", "Dunes of Sand", "Joy" and "Work".

Similarly to Lee's collaborative project iamamiwhoami, the album was released with an accompanying film produced by Lee and John Strandh. In visual alliance with Comme des Garçons, Lee is seen wearing the fashion label's designs on the artwork for the album's singles and throughout the album's accompanying film. This is part of an ongoing collaboration with Comme des Garçons. Lee has previously worn their designs during Concert in Blue and while touring with the duo Röyksopp.

== Background ==
On 3 March 2017, iamamiwhoami uploaded a new video to YouTube titled "introducing; ionnalee". The video featured clips from the then forthcoming music video for the song "Samaritan". It was released in full on 10 March 2017 for digital download and streaming and its music video was made available on YouTube. To date the music video has gained over 330,000 views.

A second single, "Not Human", was released on 2 June 2017. The song was co-written by Lee and American electronic musician Com Truise.

A third single, "Simmer Down", was released on 6 October 2017. It was co-written by Lee and her longtime collaborator Claes Björklund. This was the first song in the history of iamamiwhoami and at this point, ionnalee, not to be accompanied by a music video.

The album's fourth single, "Gone", was released on 23 November 2017, along with a music video. With the release of "Gone", Lee also announced the then forthcoming album Everyone Afraid to Be Forgotten and it was made available for pre-order ahead of its 16 February 2018 release.

With the announcement of Everyone Afraid to Be Forgotten, the album was described as being "a reflection of an anxious age where everyone keeps raising their voice louder, where a song isn't enough, where individuality is sold and promoted as products on social media, making statements to be immortalised and it's [Lee's] own fear not being visible in the shadows".

A trailer for the album's accompanying film was released on 11 January 2018, and a fifth single "Dunes of Sand" was released on 19 January 2018 featuring vocals from Jamie Irrepressible. This was the second song not to be accompanied by a music video. However, a live performance filmed at Lee's childhood church in Fivelstad, Sweden, was uploaded to YouTube with Claes Björklund accompanying her on the church's organ. Lee revealed in a post on Instagram that only her father, sister and the church's janitor were in attendance.

On 2 February 2018, two weeks before the album was released, "Joy" was released as the sixth single along with its music video. It was followed by the seventh and final single, "Work", on 9 February 2018 and marked the third single not to receive a music video.

In a message published on Facebook on 16 February 2018, Lee revealed she had been working on the album for two and a half years, but the creative process had been 10 years in the making. The song "Work" was first intended for iamamiwhoami's album Kin (2012), but only received a finalised chorus for Everyone Afraid to Be Forgotten. The song "Here Is a Warning" was written for an unreleased solo project Mouth of the River. The verses of "Simmer Down" were conceived before iamamiwhoami and its chorus was written for Everyone Afraid to Be Forgotten. The songs "Gone" and "Like Hell" are full versions of two early clips released by iamamiwhoami in 2010 when their cryptic videos went viral online. "Like Hell" was also performed a capella during iamamiwhoami's online concert in December 2010.

Lyrics to the songs "Samaritan" and "Fold" were included in a cryptic interview published by Bullet Media in 2011.

== Film ==
Much like iamamiwhoami's releases, Everyone Afraid to Be Forgotten has an accompanying film. The film premiered on ionnalee.com on 16 February 2018 and could be watched for free via YouTube. It was produced by Lee and John Strandh.

The film follows Lee, as the film's protagonist, through various chapters as she escapes captivity and finds herself isolated from the outside world by those who helped her. Lee is told about an "unending party" and, after some time, finds herself drawn to leave the care of those helping her in order to discover the party for herself. She is rejected by the guests at the party and finds solace in others who are from the "outside" like she is. Together, they fight against those who rejected them and attend the party. Lee is later captured and held captive within the same room where the film opened.

== Tour background and crowdfunding ==
On 2 February 2018, Lee announced that a live show would take place on 9 May 2018 at Heaven, London. Later the same day, Lee announced plans for a world tour and asked her followers to help make it a reality. She launched a Kickstarter to raise funds to produce the world tour. The Kickstarter's goal of 375,000 SEK was achieved within five days. Lee posted a message on Instagram to thank her followers for their support.

On 4 March 2018, it was announced that the Kickstater's first stretch goal was reached securing one more location for the tour and Barcelona was revealed as the additional location. A second stretch goal, enabling merchandise to be sold on the tour, was reached on 6 March 2018. A third stretch goal, enabling a live version of "Dunes of Sand" to be released was reached on 14 March 2018. This was followed by a fourth stretch goal enabling a second additional date in Rio de Janeiro to be added to the tour.

The Kickstarter closed at midnight on 16 March 2018 having raised a total of 750,187 kr.

=== Tour dates ===
Date	City	Country	Venue	Opening act
9 May 2018	London	England	Heaven	Man Without Country; Tungorna
18 May 2018	Copenhagen	Denmark	Lille Vega	Tungorna
19 May 2018	Stockholm	Sweden	Slaktkyrkan	Tungorna
9 June 2018	Moscow	Russia	Red Club	Tungorna
10 June 2018	Saint Petersburg	Russia	Stereoleto	—N/a
16 June 2018	Cardiff	Wales	Festival of Voice	—N/a
4 August 2018	Stockholm	Sweden	Euro Pride 2018	—N/a
13 August 2018	Chicago	United States	Bottom Lounge	Tungorna
15 August 2018	Los Angeles	United States	El Rey Theatre	Tungorna
17 August 2018	San Francisco	United States	Mezzanine	Tungorna
23 August 2018	São Paulo	Brazil	Cine Joia	—N/a
25 August 2018	Rio de Janeiro	Brazil	Queremos! Festival	—N/a
28 August 2018	New York City	United States	Music Hall of Williamsburg	Tungorna
31 August 2018	Gothenburg	Sweden	Statement Festival	—N/a
12 October 2018	Kyiv	Ukraine	Cafe Letage	Tungorna
13 October 2018	Prague	Czech Republic	Meet Factory	Tungorna
17 October 2018	Berlin	Germany	Berghain Club	Man Without Country; Tungorna
26 October 2018	Bilbao	Spain	BIME Live	—N/a
10 December 2018	London	England	The Oval Space	Tungorna; Zhala
12 December 2018	Warsaw	Poland	Smolna	Tungorna
23 March 2019	Barcelona	Spain	Razzmatazz	Tungorna
6 April 2019	Paris	France	Les Femmes S'en Mêlent	—N/a
7 April 2019	Amsterdam	Netherlands	Paradiso Noord	Tungorna

== Critical reception ==
Professional ratings
Review scores
Source	Rating
musicOMH	3/5 stars
The Skinny	2/5 stars
Spectrum Culture	3.5/5 stars

Everyone Afraid to Be Forgotten received mixed to positive reviews from music critics. Ben Hogwood of musicOMH wrote, "There is no doubt that Everyone Afraid To Be Forgotten is a hugely ambitious piece of work, and it throws a lot of effort into the creative process while making use of the considerable guile Lee has with her best electronic work. At times it could do with more of this, for its biggest tracks are overblown, and it does threaten to overstay its welcome at an hour and five minutes." Nadia Younes of The Skinny described the album as "confusing, inconsistent and overly complicated" Rose Kerr of Spectrum Culture declared that on the album, "synth and dance-pop prevail, with an intriguing battle on display between her avant-garde tendencies and more accessible pop" and added that the artist has "chosen not to change her synth-pop style and dramatic aesthetics."

== Track listing ==
All tracks written and produced by Jonna Lee, except where noted.

No.	Title	Length
1.	"Watches Watches"	3:44
2.	"Joy"	4:20
3.	"Work"	3:36
4.	"Like Hell"	3:43
5.	"Not Human" (writers: Lee, Com Truise)	5:17
6.	"Temple"	4:18
7.	"Samaritan" (producers: Lee, Barbelle)	4:21
8.	"Dunes of Sand" (with Jamie Irrepressible)	4:44
9.	"Blazing"	4:05
10.	"Simmer Down" (writers: Lee, Barbelle)	4:09
11.	"Here Is a Warning"	3:36
12.	"Gone"	4:37
13.	"Memento" (with Barbelle)	4:25
14.	"Harvest" (with TR/ST; producers: Lee, TR/ST)	5:02
15.	"Fold"	5:39

Notes

- All track titles are stylised in all caps.

== Personnel ==
Credits adapted from the liner notes of Everyone Afraid to Be Forgotten.

=== Music ===
- ionnalee – vocals, instruments, production
- Claes Björklund – instruments, mixing (all tracks); production (track 7; as Barbelle)
- TR/ST – vocals, production (track 14)
- Sören von Malmborg – mastering

=== Visual ===
- ionnalee – film direction, film editing
- John Strandh – film direction, grading
- Chimney Sweden – visual effects

=== Artwork ===
- ionnalee – art direction, sculpture
- John Strandh – art direction, photography
- Jacob Hulmston – graphic design

== Release history ==
Region	Date	Format	Label	Ref.
Various	16 February 2018	CD; LP; digital download	To whom it may concern.	

== Accolades ==
Awards

Year	Category	Award	Result	Ref.
2019	Synth Album of the Year	Manifestgalan	Nominated	

Year End Lists

Publication	Accolade	Rank	Ref.
Higher Plain Music	Top 30 Albums of 2018	1	
5:4	Top 40 Albums of 2018	9	
