= Be Here Soon =

Be Here Soon may refer to:

- Be Here Soon (Jeff Bridges album)
- Be Here Soon (iamamiwhoami album)
