= Remember the Future (Jonna Lee album) =

Studio album by ionnalee
- Released: 31 May 2019
- Recorded: 2018
- Studio: Home Studio (Sweden)
- Genre: Electropop
- Length: 50:08
- Label: To whom it may concern.
- Producer: Jonna Lee; Claes Björklund; Röyksopp

ionnalee chronology
| Everyone Afraid to Be Forgotten (2018) | Remember the Future (2019) |

Singles from Remember the Future
- 1. "Open Sea" Released: 8 February 2019; 2. "Some Body" Released: 26 April 2019; 3. "Remember the Future" Released: 24 May 2019

Remember the Future (stylised in all caps) is the fourth (Note: Remember the Future is Lee's fourth solo album, second under her moniker ionnalee, fifth including iamamiwhoami albums and seventh overall.) studio album by Swedish singer Jonna Lee. It was released on 31 May 2019 by her own record label To whom it may concern. It has spawned the lead single "Open Sea" released on 8 February 2019, "Some Body" released on 26 April 2019 and "Remember the Future" released on 24 May 2019. It features contributions from her iamamiwhoami collaborator, Claes Björklund, as well as Röyksopp, Zola Jesus and Jennie Abrahamson.

== Background and release ==
Lee has embarked on a tour promoting her album, Everyone Afraid to Be Forgotten. The artist stated that between shows "I found myself alone in my studio at every given chance, inspired from that whole synergy I experienced with the audience on stage."

On 3 February 2019, the artist announced the release date of the lead single, "Open Sea", released on 8 February 2019, alongside the new album, its title, release date, pre-order and North America tour dates.

In March 2019, Lee revealed the album's track listing and artwork as well as new tour dates.

On 17 April 2019, Jonna Lee announced the second single, "Some Body" released on 26 April 2019, preceding the album, alongside the video premiered on 25 April 2019 on the YouTube channel of iamamiwhoami.

== Concept ==
Lee described Remember the Future as "visionary album of daring to dream, and shooting for the stars, despite the paradoxical underlying chafing knowledge that we're destroying our planet".

== Artwork ==
The robot featured on the album cover was created by Lee. She portrayed it as "a retro space-age symbol of the visions of the past when people were dreaming of exploring the universe and the possibilities seemed endless."

== Promotion ==
To promote the album, Lee embarked on a tour in United States and Canada. It began on 19 April 2019. The European leg of the tour was cancelled due to the artist's health issues.

| Date | City | Country | Venue | Other artists |
|---|---|---|---|---|
| 19 April 2019 | Brooklyn | United States | Elsewhere | Allie X |
| 21 April 2019 | New York City | United States | Bowery Ballroom | Allie X |
| 22 April 2019 | Cambridge | United States | The Sinclair | Allie X |
| 25 April 2019 | Montreal | Canada | l'Astral | Allie X |
| 26 April 2019 | Toronto | Canada | Phoenix Concert Theatre | TR/ST |
| 28 April 2019 | Chicago | United States | Bottom Lounge | Allie X |
| 1 May 2019 | Portland | United States | Holocene | Allie X |
| 3 May 2019 | Seattle | United States | The Showbox | Allie X |
| 4 May 2019 | Vancouver | Canada | Venue | Allie X |
| 9 May 2019 | San Francisco | United States | Great American Music Hall | Allie X |
| 10 May 2019 | Los Angeles | United States | The Fonda | Allie X |

== Critical reception ==
Professional ratings
Review scores
| Source | Rating |
|---|---|
| AllMusic | 4/5 stars |
| Gaffa | 4/6 stars |
| Higher Plain Music | 8/10 |
| Pitchfork | 7.2/10 |
| Spectrum Culture | 2.5/5 stars |

Remember The Future received generally positive reviews from music critics. Eric Torres of Pitchfork stated that Lee "tilts her off-kilter electropop toward compellingly dystopian visions" while rating the album 7.2 out of 10. In her review for AllMusic, Heather Phares declared that on the album, Jonna Lee "takes a lighter, more hopeful - and more purely pop - approach." She further stated that she "doesn't sacrifice any of her music's complexity" and "carefully balances the album's more direct songs with spacious interludes that suggest spaces to confront and embrace the hope and fear that come with the unknown."

== Track listing ==
All tracks are written by ionnalee, except where noted.

| No. | Title | Length |
|---|---|---|
| 1. | "Open Sea" | 4:30 |
| 2. | "Wipe It Off" | 3:42 |
| 3. | "Some Body" (writers: ionnalee, Claes Björklund) | 4:20 |
| 4. | "Matters" (with Zola Jesus; writer: ionnalee; additional writers: Zola Jesus, Björklund) | 6:40 |
| 5. | "Islander" | 4:28 |
| 6. | "Remember the Future" | 5:13 |
| 7. | "Crystal" (with Jennie Abrahamson) | 5:54 |
| 8. | "Race Against" | 2:41 |
| 9. | "Silence My Drum" | 3:46 |
| 10. | "Mysteries of Love" (writers: David Lynch, Angelo Badalamenti) | 4:40 |
| 11. | "I Keep" | 4:14 |
| Total length: | | 50:08 |

Notes

- All tracks stylised in all caps, except "I Keep" stylised as "i KEEP".

== Personnel ==
Credits adapted from the liner notes of Remember the Future.

=== Musicians ===
- ionnalee – vocals, instruments
- Zola Jesus – vocals (track 4)
- Jennie Abrahamson – vocals (track 7)
- Claes Björklund – instruments (tracks: 1–4, 6, 7, 9)
- Tungorna – instruments (track 2); additional instruments (track 1); vocals (track 8)
- Svein Berge – instruments (track 10)
- Torbjørn Brundtland – instruments (track 10)
- Johannes Berglund – additional instruments (track 6)

=== Technical personnel ===
- ionnalee – production (tracks: 2–5, 7–11); co-production (tracks: 1, 6); mixing (tracks: 5, 8); mastering (track 5)
- Claes Björklund – production (tracks: 1, 6); co-production (tracks: 3, 7); mixing (tracks: 5)
- Röyksopp – production (track 10)
- Johannes Berglund – mixing (tracks 1–4, 6, 7, 9–11)
- Sören von Malmborg – mastering (tracks 1–4, 6–11)

=== Artwork ===
- ionnalee – art direction, robot, costume
- Comme des Garçons – costume
- John Strandh – photography
- Jacob Hulmston – graphic design

== Release history ==
| Region | Date | Format | Label | Ref. |
|---|---|---|---|---|
| Worldwide | 31 May 2019 | Digital download | To whom it may concern. | |
| Sweden | 3 July 2019 | LP | To whom it may concern. | |
| Sweden | 22 July 2019 | CD | To whom it may concern. | |
