= Matt Urmy =

Musical Artist & Entrepreneur

- Born: New York City, United States
- Origin: Nashville, Tennessee, United States
- Genres: Americana, folk, country, Singer-songwriter
- Occupations: Singer-songwriter, poet, entrepreneur
- Instruments: Vocals, guitar, drums, keys, bass, flute, percussion
- Years active: 2000s–present
- Labels: Acklen Records, Tritone Records, Artist Growth Records
- Website: matturmy.com

Matt Urmy is an American singer-songwriter, poet, and entrepreneur. He is the co-founder and chief executive officer of Artist Growth, a music management software company. As a musician, he has released several albums, including Out of the Ashes (2017) and South of the Sky (2021). He has also authored works of poetry and children's literature, including the poetry collection The Rain in the Bell (2015). He was included in the Rolling Stone's list of "Artists to Watch" in 2017.

== Early life and education ==
Urmy was born in New York City and raised in Nashville, Tennessee. He studied poetry at the University of Tennessee in Knoxville, Tennessee. He later completed a Master of Fine Arts in creative writing at Spalding University. He was also trained in Māori healing practices under Māori healer Hohepa Delamere.

== Career ==
=== Music ===
Urmy began his music career performing as a solo artist and with bands, working across songwriting, recording, and live performance.

In 2017, Urmy released Out of the Ashes, an album recorded with producer Cowboy Jack Clement. The recordings were largely believed to have been lost in a 2011 fire at Clement's home studio, which Urmy witnessed, before some material was later recovered from surviving files. Urmy subsequently spent several years reconstructing the album. The project includes vocal contributions from Clement, and John Prine appears on the title track. Clement died in 2013 before the album was completed. The Nashville Scene described the album as "the most fascinating Nashville album of the past decade." Rolling Stone featured Urmy as an "Artist to Watch" in 2017.

In 2013, Urmy helped organise Honoring a Legend: A Tribute to Cowboy Jack, a concert featuring collaborators of Jack Clement, including Kris Kristofferson, Charley Pride, John Prine, and Emmylou Harris, with video tributes from Bono and Michelle Obama.

Urmy's album South of the Sky was released in 2021. Produced by Truck Roley and engineered by Brandon Bell, it is a concept work influenced by Willie Nelson's Phases and Stages. The recording combines electronic and acoustic instrumentation, with contributions from Mike Daly, Rachel Loy, and Nick Buda, and guest vocals by Jonell Mosser and Leticia Wolf. Singles from the album, including "Raging Hearts" and "Blind", were featured in New Music Friday playlists curated by NPR Music.

=== Entrepreneurship ===
Urmy co-founded Artist Growth in 2011 and continues to serve as its CEO. He developed Artist Growth as a cloud-based platform used to manage touring, scheduling, finances, and other operational aspects of music careers.

Artist Growth has been used by music companies and management organisations, including labels under Universal Music Group and Warner Music Group. In October 2012, Urmy was named one of Forbes's "Up and Comers."

== Published works ==
Urmy has authored works of poetry and children's literature. His poetry chapbook Ghosts in a House was published by Finishing Line Press in 2007. He later published the poetry collection The Rain in the Bell through Iris Press in 2015. In 2020, he published and illustrated the children's book Go Ask the Moon through Tritone Media.

His work has also appeared in literary magazines including The Minnetonka Review and Symposeum.

=== Bibliography ===
Title	Publisher	Year	ISBN
Ghosts in a House	Finishing Line Press	2007	978-1599242019
The Rain in the Bell	Iris Press	2015	979-8503295597
Go Ask the Moon	Tritone Media	2020	978-1735100821

== Discography ==
=== Albums ===
Year	Title	Artist(s)	Label
2006	Shadow of a Lovely Place	Matt Urmy	Independent
2011	Sweet Lonesome	Matt Urmy	Acklen Records
2017	Out of the Ashes	Matt Urmy, Cowboy Jack Clement & John Prine (guests)	Tritone Records
2021	South of the Sky	Matt Urmy	Tritone / Artist Growth Records

== See also ==
- Artist Growth
- Cowboy Jack Clement
- John Prine
- List of people from Nashville, Tennessee
