= Be Here Soon (iamamiwhoami album) =

Studio album by iamamiwhoami
- Released: 3 June 2022
- Studio: TWIMC studios, Sweden; INGRID Studios, Stockholm, Sweden
- Genre: Folktronica
- Length: 41:01
- Label: To whom it may concern.
- Producer: Claes Björklund, ionnalee

Iamamiwhoami chronology
Kronologi (2020)	Be Here Soon (2022)

Singles from Be Here Soon
- 1. "Changes" Released: April 28, 2022

Be Here Soon is the fourth studio album by Swedish audiovisual project iamamiwhoami, consisting of singer and songwriter Jonna Lee and record producer Claes Björklund. It was released on 3 June 2022 on Lee's label To whom it may concern. It is the first studio album from the project in eight years.

The album took a more folk-inspired direction than previous projects from the group, returning to Lee's roots as a solo artist. The album's visuals contain themes such as Lee's struggle with obsessive-compulsive disorder, as well as her pregnancy.

== Release ==
The visual album was announced by Lee through social media on 31 March 2022. The album's first chapter and lead single "Don't Wait for Me" was released on the same day, with each subsequent chapter being released weekly. The announcement was largely a surprise, with no previous information from any of the crew hinting towards another iamamiwhoami album.

The release date of the album was chosen before Lee knew she was pregnant, and the release date coincidentally aligned with her due date. Lee's baby was born on 25 May 2022; Be Here Soon came out in digital format on June 3.

Physical editions of Be Here Soon were released in limited CD+DVD and 12-inch vinyl LP formats, as well as a CD, DVD and LP collectors bundle with exclusive items available exclusively on To whom it may concern.'s website, originally slated for a September 2022 release.

== Critical reception ==
Professional ratings
Review scores
Source	Rating
GAFFA.dk	6/6 stars
GAFFA.se	4/6 stars
Higher Plain Music	8.5/10
Jenesaispop	3/5 stars
Mojo	3/5 stars

Be Here Soon received generally positive reviews. Simon Heggum of Gaffa Denmark was particularly enthusiastic, naming the album a "folktronic masterpiece" containing Lee's "strongest vocal performance to date".

== Tour background ==
Following the album's release, Lee announced the first leg of a world tour on her social media; the tour started in Amsterdam on 26 February 2023 and continued on in the United States and Canada throughout April and May 2023. iamamiwhoami performed with a full band for the first time in ten years and a few special guests such as Imogen Heap joined Lee on stage on specific dates.

=== Tour dates ===
Date	City	Country	Venue	Opening act	Special guest
26 February 2023	Amsterdam	Netherlands	Paradiso Noord	Mavica	
2 March 2023	London	United Kingdom	EartH (Evolutionary Arts Hackney)	Mavica; Jenny Wilson	Imogen Heap; Tove Skeidsvoll
8 March 2023	Berlin	Germany	Club Gretchen	Jenny Wilson	
12 April 2023	Philadelphia	United States	The Foundry	Luminous Kid	
14 April 2023	Brooklyn	United States	Elsewhere	Luminous Kid	
16 April 2023	Boston	United States	Paradise Rock Club	Luminous Kid	
18 April 2023	Montreal	Canada	Théâtre Fairmount	Luminous Kid; Tess Roby	
19 April 2023	Toronto	Canada	Opera House	Luminous Kid; Tess Roby	
21 April 2023	Chicago	United States	Metro	Luminous Kid	
24 April 2023	Minneapolis	United States	Fine Line	Luminous Kid	
26 April 2023	Denver	United States	Marquis Theater	Luminous Kid	
29 April 2023	Los Angeles	United States	Fonda Theatre	Luminous Kid	Zola Jesus; TR/ST
2 May 2023	San Francisco	United States	Great American Music Hall	Luminous Kid	Vander Von Odd
4 May 2023	Portland	United States	Wonder Ballroom	Luminous Kid	
5 May 2023	Seattle	United States	The Showbox	Luminous Kid	
7 May 2023	Vancouver	Canada	The Hollywood	Luminous Kid	
16 August 2023	Vadstena	Sweden	Shakespearefabriken	Jenny Wilson	Zola Jesus
17 August 2023	Vadstena	Sweden	Shakespearefabriken	Jenny Wilson	Zola Jesus
18 August 2023	Vadstena	Sweden	Shakespearefabriken	Jenny Wilson	Zola Jesus
7 December 2023	São Paulo	Brazil	Carioca Club	N/A	
9 December 2023	Rio de Janeiro	Brazil	Sacadura 154	N/A	

=== Cancelled shows ===
List of cancelled concerts
Date	City	Country	Venue	Reason
27 February 2023	Glasgow	United Kingdom	SWG3 Studio	Logistic reasons

== Track listing ==
All tracks are written by Jonna Lee and Claes Björklund

No.	Title	Length
1.	"Don't Wait for Me"	3:17
2.	"Canyon" (featuring Lars Winnerbäck)	4:05
3.	"Zeven"	3:36
4.	"I Tenacious"	3:09
5.	"Changes"	4:18
6.	"Flying or Falling"	3:44
7.	"A Thousand Years"	5:09
8.	"Thunder Lightning"	5:04
9.	"Call My Name"	3:49
10.	"Walking on Air"	4:50
Total length:		41:01
