= O Music Awards =

Music and technology awards show

- Logo of the 2013 O Music Awards.
- Awarded for: Awards achievement in the intersection between music and technology
- Country: United States
- Presented by: MTV, Viacom
- First award: April 28, 2011; 15 years ago
- Final award: June 19, 2013; 13 years ago
- Website: omusicawards.com

The O Music Awards (commonly abbreviated as the OMAs) was an awards show presented by MTV to honor music, technology and intersection between the two. The 1st O Music Award ceremony was held on April 28, 2011 on Fremont Street in Downtown Las Vegas. The 3rd O Music Awards was held on June 27, 2012. The O Music Awards brand continues year-round through a combination of a music and tech blog, called 'The O Music Blog', and a New York–based live events' series called 'Unboxed, which features music, tech, art, and interactivity. The fourth and final edition was held on June 19, 2013.

Past winners include Spotify (Best Music Hosting App), Bjork (Digital Genius Award), Way Out West (Most Innovative Festival), Crowd Juke (Best Music Hack) and Lady Gaga (A Must-Follow Artist On Twitter and an Innovative Artist). The show has also featured up-and-coming acts like Foster The People and Alabama Shakes, as well as having many icons like The Flaming Lips and Robyn.

Running in tandem with the awards and performances, O Music Awards has achieved 3 Guinness World Records. During the inaugural O Music Awards in Las Vegas in April 2011, rapper Chiddy of Chiddy Bang received Guinness World Records titles for the Longest Freestyle Rap and the Longest Marathon Rapping record after rapping for 9 hours, 16 minutes and 22 seconds. For O Music Awards 2, the show took on the goal of the Longest Team Dance Marathon. A group of 13 dancers assembled at LA’s famed club The Roxy on Halloween Eve to take on the record. 24 hours later, all 13 dancers were still standing and had broken the record. The effort also raised more than $32,000 to fight bullying, with the money being divided equally between the Gay, Lesbian & Straight Education Network (GLSEN), the It Gets Better Project, the Gay Straight Alliance Network (GSA), Human Rights Campaign (HRC), Gay & Lesbian Alliance Against Defamation (GLAAD), and The Trevor Project.

== Award winners ==
=== 2011 ===
O Music Awards 2011: I

1. Best Fan Cover: Alex Goot
2. Funniest Music Short: Lonely Island, I Just Had Sex
3. Innovative Artist: Lady Gaga
4. Must Follow Artist on Twitter: Lady Gaga
5. Most Innovative Music Video: Andy Grammer, Keep Your Head Up
6. Fan Army FTW: Tokio Hotel’s Aliens
7. NSFW Music Video: Thirty Seconds to Mars, "Hurricane"
8. Most Viral Dance: Willow Smith, Whip My Hair
9. Best Independent Music Blog: Aquarium Drunkard
10. Best Music Discovery Service: Pandora
11. Best Performance Series: Daryl Hall, "Live From Daryl’s House"
12. Favorite F**k Yeah Tumblr: F**k Yeah Adam Lambert
13. Favorite Animated GIF: Nicki Minaj
14. Best Fan Forum: Michael Jackson – MJJ Community
15. Best Music Hack: Invisible Instruments
16. Best Animal Performance: Parrot Dancing To Willow Smith’s Whip My Hair
17. Best Tweet: Kanye West – “I hate when I’m on a flight and I wake up with a water bottle next to me like oh great now I gotta be responsible for this water bottle”

O Music Awards 2011: II

1. Must Follow Artist on Twitter: Adam Lambert
2. Fan Army FTW: Tokio Hotel's Aliens
3. Best Lyrics Video: Joe Jonas, See No More
4. Best Artist With a Camera Phone: Demi Lovato
5. Oops I Did It Online: James Blunt
6. Best Web-Born Artist: Kina Grannis
7. Best Vintage Viral Video: Nirvana Smells Like Teen Spirit
8. Digital Genius Award: Björk
9. Best Fan Cover: Marc Martel Somebody to Love by Queen
10. Hottest Music NILF: Katie Morse
11. WTF I Love This Award: Nyan Cat
12. Too Much Ass for TV: Marilyn Manson, "Born Villain"
13. Most Outrageous Tweet: @BritneySpears to @DJPaulyD: "Hope you enjoyed your dance! Was tough getting my legs around that big blowout :)"
14. Best Music Forum: Rap Godfathers
15. Most Innovative Festival: Way Out West
16. Best Music App: Sound Cloud
17. Best Music Hack: Crowd Juke
18. Beyond the Blog: Needle Drop
19. Most Addictive Social Music Service: Spotify
20. Biggest Superfan: Billy Humanoid

=== 2012 ===
O Music Awards 2012:

1. Best Artist With A Cameraphone: Selena Gomez
2. Best Artist/Digital Entrepreneur: Katy Goodman
3. Best Music App: Artist growth
4. Best Music Hack: Bohemian Rhapsichord
5. Best Music Teacher Replacement: Bandhappy
6. Best Online Concert Experience: 30 Seconds to Mars
7. Best Protest Song: "Bohemian Rhapsody"
8. Best Web-Born Artist: Karmin
9. Beyond the Blog Award: Metal Injection
10. Beyond the DJ: Most Innovative Solo Performer: MNDR
11. Digital Genius Award: iamamiwhoami
12. Fan Army FTW: Tokio Hotel: Aliens
13. Hottest Music NILF: Tatiana Simonian: Head of Music at Twitter
14. Most Addictive Social Music Service: Myxer Social Radio
15. Most Adorable Viral Star: Abby Koocher: "Bong Pugz"
16. Most Extreme Fan Outreach: Riot in Paris
17. Most F***ed-Up Live Performance Gone Viral: Kelvin Cheung: Executes Epic Drum Solo Fail
18. Most Innovative Music Video: We The Kings Say You Like Me
19. Most Intense Social Spat: Frances Cobain vs. Courtney Love
20. Must Follow Artist on Twitter: Adam Lambert
21. Too Much Ass For TV: Big Freedia: "Booty Battle" Video Game
22. WTF I Love This Award: Drinkify
