= Concert in Blue =

Live album by iamamiwhoami
- Released: 2 September 2015
- Recorded: 29 April 2015
- Length: 1:26:00
- Label: To whom it may concern.
- Director: WAVE
- Producer: Claes Björklund

iamamiwhoami chronology
Blue (2014)	Concert in Blue (2015)	Kronologi (2020)

Singles from Concert In Blue
- 1. "The Deadlock" Released: 2 September 2015

Concert in Blue (stylised as CONCERT IN~BLUE) is an in-studio live performance installation, also released as film, (the second live release) by Swedish audiovisual project iamamiwhoami, led by singer-songwriter Jonna Lee. It was released on 2 September 2015 in both physical and digital formats. The album was announced on 30 April 2015 through the website of Lee's label, To whom it may concern, and on the same day, it was made available for pre-order via the same website. The live show of Concert In Blue was recorded (and streamed) on 29 April 2015. The concert also sees the release of the first new iamamiwhoami song since 2014, titled "The Deadlock", which was the first single released from the album on 2 September 2015.

== Background ==
One month before the 29 April 2015 stream of the concert itself, iamamiwhoami asked their fans in a short video to submit photos or videos of themselves to be incorporated into the live show. The request asked fans to sing along with songs from BLUE in their videos. The videos were incorporated into the stage dressings of "the last dancer", "blue blue" and "shadowshow", while the photographs became a slideshow during "goods"; for "shadowshow", Jonna also appeared on the backdrop in splitscreen, imitating fans' movements. The new song ("The Deadlock") featured on this release was not registered in any database, or heard of until the event. The song name was first revealed via a tweet from To whom it may concern., with the hashtag "#thedeadlock," while the song streamed in concert. It was then visible in the credits, and later added to the track-list on the To whom it may concern website. Japanese fashion designer Comme des Garçons provided the unique, titular garment for the "Deadlock" performance.

For the concert proper, Jonna Lee, keyboardist/producer Claes Björklund, drummer Thomas Hedlund and backing vocalist Beatrice Johansson perform in all white unitards in front of a large projection screen. The lighting is minimal, mainly using flood and floor lamps. There are regular breaks throughout the performance for Lee to change outfits; during these moments, the footage cuts to an all-white room where performers in white zentai (referred to as "Shadows") wrangle instruments for the stage, browse galleries of fan photographs or dance along with the music. For several songs, Shadows join Jonna in front of the large projection screen for a dance number.

As an encore, a fan video featuring an American couple begins on the projection screen. After a brief, conversation from the couple, Björklund and Hedlund begin performing "chasing kites", with Jonna re-emerging to sing the vocal line alongside the couple on screen. The footage cuts to the credits of the film at the first chorus.

== Release ==
The concert was released on the towhomitmayconcern website, iTunes, Vimeo and Spotify. Digital release, Standard edition CD and 12-inch vinyl LP editions of Concert In Blue, as well as a limited-edition DVD bundle (including extra bridges and an outro), were made available via To whom it may concern's official online shop on 30 April 2015; the physical releases were exclusively released by To whom it may concern. All three physical editions include a 64-page book with images, illustrations, artworks, still images and text from the concert and the BLUE audiovisual series collected from the community around iamamiwhoami and the project itself.

== Critical reception ==
Professional ratings
Review scores
Source	Rating
musicOMH	3/5 stars

Alex Jeffery of musicOMH noted that, "while undoubtedly rough around the edges, the ‘installation’ was armed with a riot of blazing ideas that imaginatively utilized the natural environment", and later noted, "while this had entertaining moments... new supporters are unlikely to be attracted. Although perhaps that is the point"

== Track listing ==
All lyrics written by Jonna Lee; all tracks written by Lee and Claes Björklund.

Standard CD and LP editions
No.	Title	Length
1.	"Vista"	5:04
2.	"Thin"	4:45
3.	"T"	4:39
4.	"Hunting for Pearls"	5:16
5.	"Fountain"	6:02
6.	"Play"	5:15
7.	"Tap Your Glass"	5:14
8.	"The Deadlock"	5:26
9.	"Chasing Kites"	5:11
10.	"Y"	6:36
11.	"The Last Dancer"	4:40
12.	"Ripple"	3:35
13.	"Blue Blue"	5:23
14.	"Shadowshow"	5:24
15.	"Goods"	5:08
Total length:		1:26:08

Standard DVD edition
No.	Title	Length
16.	"Chasing Kites (Outro)"	2:41
Total length:		1:30:19

Notes

- All tracks are stylised in lowercase letters. For example, "The Deadlock" is stylised as "the deadlock".

== Personnel ==
Credits adapted from the To whom it may concern. website, as well as the credits shown after the concert.

=== Music ===
- Jonna Lee – executive production, instruments, lyrics, mixing, music, vocals, keyboards
- Claes Björklund – synthesizers, computers, instruments, mixing, music, production, vocals
- Thomas Hedlund - drums
- Beatrice Johansson – backing vocals
- Joel Modin – sound engineer

=== Visual ===
- Jonna Lee – executive production
- Beatrice Johansson – production coordination
- Mathieu Mirano – costume
- Comme des Garçons – "the deadlock" costume
- Niklas Johannson – camera operation
- Viktor Kumlin – camera operation
- WAVE – post-production, direction
- Chris Higham – technical crew
- Per Olsson – technical crew
- Sergio C Ayala – DIT
- Caroline Olofsson – styling
- Linnéa Lindgren Persson – production assistant

=== Artwork ===
- John Strandh – photography direction
- Jan Scharlau – graphic design

== Release history ==
Date	Label	Release	Format
29 April 2015	To whom it may concern.	Film	Stream
2 September 2015	To whom it may concern.	Album; Film	Download; stream; CD; LP; DVD
