= Jonna Lee (singer) =

Swedish musician (born 1981)

- Born: Jonna Emily Lee Nilsson; 3 October 1981 (age 45); Linköping, Sweden
- Other name: ionnalee
- Occupations: Singer; songwriter; record producer; filmmaker
- Years active: 1998–present
- Awards: Awards
- Musical career
- Genres: Eurodance (as part of Rolling Circus); folk-pop (early solo career); electropop; indie pop; art pop
- Instruments: Vocals; guitar; piano; keyboards; drums; harmonica; synthesiser
- Labels: To whom it may concern.; Razzia
- Member of: iamamiwhoami
- Formerly of: Rolling Circus
- Website: ionnalee.com

Jonna Emily Lee (born 3 October 1981) is a Swedish singer, songwriter, record producer and visual director. Lee is the creator and artist of audiovisual online project iamamiwhoami who since 2009 have released their audiovisual series online. Since her first solo album, she has collaborated with music producer and artist Claes Björklund who is also a member of iamamiwhoami. In 2017, Lee started using the moniker ionnalee for her new solo project. In February 2018 she released her debut solo album, Everyone Afraid to Be Forgotten. With the album she also created her own world tour co funded by her fans via Kickstarter. ionnalee remixed Moby's "The Ceremony of Innocence" which was released in December 2018, and in February, her sophomore solo album Remember the Future was announced with the release date 31 May 2019.

Lee toured with Norwegian duo Röyksopp from 2015 to 2017. She is also a visual director for all her projects and the founder of the independent label To whom it may concern.

== Early life ==
Born in Linköping, Lee grew up in the small village of Fågelsta with her mother and siblings. No one in her family had any musical background but Lee had an interest in music as a young child, and ran away from home to London in her teens due to trying conditions at home. In 2002, Lee moved to Stockholm, where she became a part of the underground indie scene. She started recording her own records that were released through her website until she was signed by the Swedish indie label, Razzia Records, in the spring 2007. She released two solo albums and one EP through Razzia Records between 2007 and 2009, but left the label in 2010 and started the independent label "To whom it may concern." to release the audiovisual projects of iamamiwhoami.

== Career ==
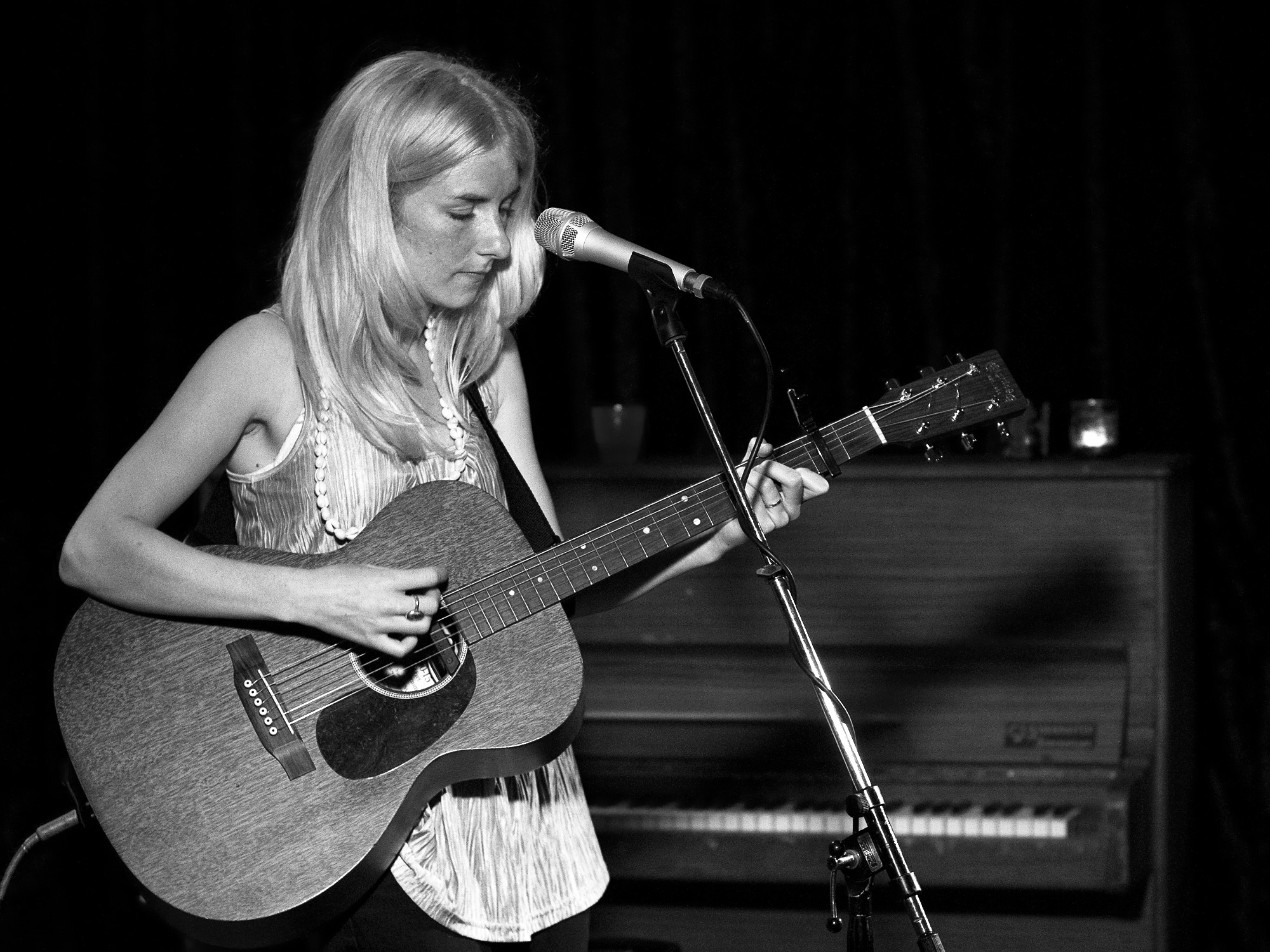
Lee, seen performing here in 2008, developed iamamiwhoami with Björklund after the release of her second album in 2009

Lee was briefly part of the Eurodance duo Rolling Circus between 1998 and 1999, who released the album On The Run, produced by Swedish musician Hans Edler. After signing with the Swedish label Razzia Records, she then released her first solo album 10 Pieces, 10 Bruises on 10 October 2007. The first single was "Dried Out Eyes," followed by "And Your Love," a duet with Ed Harcourt, who also produced three tracks on the album. Lee produced the rest of the record with her collaborator, Claes Björklund who is a member of Travis in London. Supergrass drummer Danny Goffey plays drums on the record. Some songs were recorded in Goffey's house in England. In September 2008, she released a five-track EP titled This War. Her second studio album This Is Jonna Lee, produced by Claes Björklund and Lee herself, was released in February 2009.

In October 2009, she released a version of the industrial electro band Nitzer Ebb's song "Violent Playground". The band celebrated it by uploading Lee's version on their website along with an interview with her. Between December 2009 and December 2016, Lee has released music and films under the pseudonym iamamiwhoami together with producer Claes Björklund and their visual collaborators.

Lee worked as a presenter for the live program P3 SESSION Sveriges Radio P3 between 2009 and 2011.

=== iamamiwhoami ===
In March 2010, there was considerable speculation that Lee was the artist featured in the viral marketing videos on YouTube uploaded by the mysterious iamamiwhoami, although her management claimed to be unaware of her involvement. According to rraurl.com and MTV Brasil, the music video for iamamiwhoami's track, "o" was directed by Viktor Kumlin, who's also the director of Lee's music video, "Something So Quiet". This later proved to be wrong.

Lee eventually came to be unofficially identified as iamamiwhoami, when she released the music video titled "t" on her channel. She also appears identifiable in the forthcoming music videos released and has performed live at the 2011 Way Out West Festival in Gothenburg, Sweden. The project has garnered award nominations and has won a Grammis Award in 2010 for being 'Innovator of the Year'. iamamiwhoami's debut album kin was released in June 2012 under the label To whom it may concern. via Co-Operative Music, and Lee was credited as the artist, co-producer, songwriter and visual producer of iamamiwhoami, officially confirming that she is iamamiwhoami (which was already known by then). Lee eventually did an interview with The Guardian in August 2012, and confirmed that she was in the "process of developing iamamiwhoami", also commenting that she was still the "same person", but "found other sides of [herself]".

In March 2022, Lee announced a new iamamiwhoami audiovisual album, Be Here Soon. The album was released on 3 June 2022.

=== ionnalee ===
On 24 February 2017, To whom it may concern., alongside Comme des Garçons and Dover Street Market, announced the release of a new single by Lee, "Samaritan", and that it was to be released under the new artistic alias of ionnalee. Following the announcement, an Instagram account for the project was launched. One week later, it was announced that To whom it may concern. would be releasing the single on 10 March. The iamamiwhoami YouTube channel uploaded a teaser for the accompanying music video for "Samaritan". The official music video was released on 10 March on the same channel.

On 2 June 2017, the second single "Not Human" with its accompanying music video followed. A third single, "Simmer Down", was released on 6 October 2017. A fourth single, "Gone", was released on 24 November 2017, followed by an announcement of ionnalee's third studio album, Everyone Afraid to Be Forgotten. The album was released on 16 February 2018 on her label To whom it may concern. On the same day, she revealed an album visual feature film directed by Lee herself alongside director of cinematography and head producer John Strandh to accompany the album.

On 2 February 2018, ionnalee launched a campaign on Kickstarter to fund a world tour for Everyone Afraid to Be Forgotten. The pledges included things from universal tickets to the city of choice of the pledger, ionnalee merchandise, props from iamamiwhoami and ionnalee visual projects, to a unique, life-sized, handmade bust, crafted by ionnalee herself. The campaign reached 100% funding within five days, gathering the amount of 375,000 SEK. Later on, more stretch goals were added, in order to bring the tour to more cities. On 15 March 2018, the campaign came to its close, with a total of 750,187 SEK raised. The tour started on 9 May 2018, at Heaven, in London, and in the course of 2018, will spread across Europe, North and South America.

On 3 February 2019, ionnalee announced the release of a new single "Open Sea" set to be released on 8 February 2019. On 4 February 2019, it was announced that ionnalee's upcoming second solo album Remember the Future is set to be released on 31 May 2019.

On 10 February 2020, ionnalee announced a tour, entitled Kronologi, of North America to celebrate the tenth anniversary since the start of the iamamiwhoami project. However, the plans for the tour were placed on hiatus due to the COVID-19 pandemic.

On 10 April 2020, ionnalee started releasing unheard tracks from the past ten years under the banner of Kronologi.

On 2 September 2020, ionnalee performed her third live-streamed concert, titled Konsert, in place of her canceled Kronologi tour. The concert was streamed for free on YouTube. She performed alongside her longtime collaborator Class Björklund. The concert featured guest appearances from TR/ST, Imogen Heap, Zola Jesus and Tungorna.

== Artistry ==
=== Musical style ===
Jonna Lee's early projects have been described as folk-pop. Her and Claes Björklund's project, iamamiwhoami, was considered an electronic music act, drawing a mix of styles, including electropop, synth-pop, art pop and avant-garde. Her music, under the moniker ionnalee, has been termed as electropop, indie pop and art pop.

=== Influences ===
Lee stated that she is influenced by Kraftwerk, Cocteau Twins, Depeche Mode, Christopher Nolan, Air and Vangelis. She also added that she enjoys listening to Blood Orange, Arca, Denis Villeneuve, Chromatics, Four Tet, Björk, Todd Terje, Disasterpeace and Mozart.

She has mentioned Madonna and Chaka Khan albums owned by her mother as her favorites when she was young.

== Awards, accolades and recognition ==
This Is Jonna Lee was chosen as the "Next Big Thing" on iTunes USA's front page in May 2009.

Lee performed at SXSW in Austin, Texas in March 2010. After SXSW, she was in the Top 5 for the SXSW 2010 Next Big Sound list, which tracks how fast music artists are adding fans across various social networking platforms.

In 2010, Lee received a Manifest Award nomination for Best Singer-Songwriter.

In December 2018, Jonna Lee received a cultural achievement award from her hometown Linköping.

Lee was nominated in 2019 for Best Synth Album of the Year for her album Everyone Afraid to Be Forgotten at the Swedish independent music awards Manifestgalan.

Lee has won three awards as iamamiwhoami.

== Discography ==
=== Studio albums ===
Title	Details
As Jonna Lee
10 Pieces, 10 Bruises	Released: 10 October 2007; Label: Razzia; Formats: CD, digital download
This Is Jonna Lee	Released: 25 February 2009; Label: Razzia; Formats: CD, digital download
As ionnalee
Everyone Afraid to Be Forgotten	Released: 16 February 2018; Label: To whom it may concern.; Formats: CD, LP, digital download
Remember the Future	Released: 31 May 2019; Label: To whom it may concern.; Formats: CD, LP, digital download
Close Your Eyes (English language version) Blund (Swedish language version)	Released: 13 September 2024; Label: To whom it may concern.; Formats: CD, LP, Digital download
Mouth of a River, pt. 1	Released: 1 April 2026; Label: To whom it may concern.; Formats: CD, LP, Digital download
Mouth of a River, pt. 2	Released: 17 June 2026; Label: To whom it may concern.; Formats: CD, LP, Digital download
Mouth of a River, pt. 3	Released: 30 October 2026; Label: To whom it may concern.; Formats: CD, LP, Digital download

=== Live albums ===
Title	Details
As ionnalee
Konsert	Released: 29 January 2021; Label: To whom it may concern.; Formats: CD, LP, digital download

=== Extended plays ===
Title	Details
As Jonna Lee
This War EP	Released: 24 September 2008; Label: Razzia; Formats: CD, digital download
As ionnalee
Isolation Live in Ödeshög	Released: 10 July 2020; Label: To whom it may concern.; Formats: digital download

=== Compilation albums ===
Title	Details
As ionnalee
Kronologi	Released: 26 June 2020; Label: To whom it may concern.; Formats: CD, LP, digital download
Kronologi 2	Released: 24 December 2024; Label: To whom it may concern.

=== Singles ===
Title	Year	Album
As Jonna Lee
"Dried Out Eyes"	2007	10 Pieces, 10 Bruises
"And Your Love" (featuring Ed Harcourt)	2008	10 Pieces, 10 Bruises
"I Wrote This Song"	2008	10 Pieces, 10 Bruises
"My High"	2009	This Is Jonna Lee
"Lake Chermain"	2009	This Is Jonna Lee
"Something So Quiet"	2009	This Is Jonna Lee
As ionnalee
"Samaritan"	2017	Everyone Afraid to Be Forgotten
"Not Human"	2017	Everyone Afraid to Be Forgotten
"Simmer Down"	2017	Everyone Afraid to Be Forgotten
"Gone"	2017	Everyone Afraid to Be Forgotten
"Dunes of Sand" (with Jamie Irrepressible)	2018	Everyone Afraid to Be Forgotten
"Joy"	2018	Everyone Afraid to Be Forgotten
"Work"	2018	Everyone Afraid to Be Forgotten
"Blazing"	2018	Everyone Afraid to Be Forgotten
"Open Sea"	2019	Remember the Future
"Some Body"	2019	Remember the Future
"Remember the Future"	2019	Remember the Future
"Matters" (with Zola Jesus)	2019	Remember the Future
"Paramount"	2019	Non-album singles
"Machinee"	2020	Non-album singles
"summer never ended the damage was all mine" "sommaren är min och jag kommer tillbaka"	2021	Close Your Eyes / Blund
"innocence of sound" "allting vill rinna ut i sand"	2024	Close Your Eyes / Blund
"la la love" "la la love" (Swedish version)	2024	Close Your Eyes / Blund
"not your cherry" "ett minne"	2024	Close Your Eyes / Blund
"luminary rainbows" "ur en klardröm"	2024	Close Your Eyes / Blund
"i built this house"	2026	MOUTH OF A RIVER, pt. 1
"bottomless blue"	2026	MOUTH OF A RIVER, pt. 1
"black shores"	2026	MOUTH OF A RIVER, pt. 2
"time to let it dry"	2026	MOUTH OF A RIVER, pt. 2
"inventor"	2026	MOUTH OF A RIVER, pt. 2
"word of mouth"	2026	MOUTH OF A RIVER, pt. 3

=== Guest appearances ===
Title	Year	Album
"What It Takes" (as Jonna Nilsson)	2004	Babylonsjukan: Original Motion Picture Soundtrack
"Violent Playground"	2009	There's a Razzia Going On, Volume 2
"Genesarets sjö" (with Tungorna, as ionnalee)	2019	Baby

=== Remixes ===
Title	Year	Artist
"The Ceremony of Innocence" (ionnalee remix)	2018	Moby

=== Albums with iamamiwhoami ===
- Bounty (2010–2011; compiled in 2013)
- In Concert (2010)
- Kin (2012)
- Blue (2014)
- Concert in Blue (2015)
- Be Here Soon (2022)
