= Kin (iamamiwhoami album) =

2012 album by iamamiwhoami

Studio album by iamamiwhoami
- Released: 11 June 2012
- Recorded: 2011
- Genres: Electropop; synth-pop; dance; experimental pop
- Length: 43:29
- Labels: To whom it may concern.; Cooperative
- Director: Robin Kempe-Bergman
- Producer: Claes Björklund

Iamamiwhoami chronology
| In Concert (2010) | Kin (2012) | Bounty (2013) |

Kin (stylised in all lowercase) is the debut studio album by Swedish audiovisual project iamamiwhoami, led by singer and songwriter Jonna Lee. It was released on 11 June 2012 on Lee's label To whom it may concern. and distributed by Cooperative Music. Formats include digital, CD, LP and DVD. The album's lead single "Sever" was released digitally on 15 February 2012, followed by the release of each of the album's tracks once every fortnight throughout the spring of 2012. The physical DVD of Kin contains all the music videos which play together as a 45-minute film.

== Background ==
Kin is iamamiwhoami's first full-length album, about two years after releasing two series of music videos (dubbed the "Preludes" and "Bounty" series) on YouTube. Additionally, during the Grammis in 2011, an anonymous woman accepted the Innovator of the Year award on behalf of iamamiwhoami and opened an envelope to reveal a blank piece of paper, hinting that the album had been in production since 2011. The album was eventually confirmed by Cooperative Music in February 2012. Unlike most traditional albums which only release singles after the album is out, singles from Kin were released on their YouTube channel, with a new song and an accompanying music video every two weeks. The music video is released one day before the single. The music videos from Kin are set as a film, with each music video linking directly to the next. They feature Jonna Lee (the only prominent human being throughout) along with five other hairy figures who later vanish, and are set in differing landscapes, ranging from a high-rise apartment building to the middle of a desert.

Kin gained attention on the Internet due to video chapters from the album being released online beginning since December 2009. Each time a new single is released, iamamiwhoami emails various music blogs to alert them, and there are no accompanying press releases or offers of interviews.

Multiple lyrics from the tracks of Kin were given as responses to questions posted in an interview with Bullett magazine in November 2011. The article also features a photo shoot featuring Lee posing in parts of a forest, and a room filled with styrofoam.

On 25 May 2012, rumours began to circulate that iamamiwhoami was still shooting videos with the announcement of ninth single "Goods", originally intended to be exclusive to the album. Iambountyfan stated that Kin had been pushed back to 4 September 2012 on their Facebook page, all of which was false. Release dates continued to fall in line with their original intention, "Goods" having a tentative release of 5 June 2012. On 30 May 2012, a cryptic video titled "iamamiwhoami; kin 20120611" was uploaded on iamamiwhoami's YouTube channel, which featured a blank sheet of paper kept within a noticeboard, as well as the name of the album, release date and ending with a logo of their label, Cooperative Music. However, on this same date, Base, iMusic and other sites withdrew all methods of buying Kin on their website. People pre-ordering the album from iMusic received an email saying that the album had been delayed until September, so all back-orders had to be cancelled.

On 6 June 2012, To whom it may concern. was updated and a shop segment was included. It was announced there that Kin would be released in two versions (CD/DVD or vinyl LP) via the website on 11 June, and Cooperative Music released it on 4 September. A merchandise section with T-shirts, socks and briefs opened. A free digital download link of Kin is included when purchasing the physical copy of the album.

== Concept ==
"I needed to create something in a form that can be held and cared for by the audience as they are part of the creation. The sounds of kin convey that. When iamamiwhoami started in early 2009 kin was not yet conceived as an idea. The process of developing kin started in August 2011."

— Jonna Lee, on the album's development

The creative process behind Kin started after iamamiwhoami played their first live show at Way Out West Festival in 2011, which Lee described as "a close encounter with the audience". In an interview with Dazed magazine, Lee stated that Kin "refers to the kinship with the audience and how it is created in a shape that the audience will be able to embrace—where our previous releases were more fluid [...] The whole kin album is tied together both musically and visually." She also elaborated on the visual aspect of the album and the videos, saying, "Everything has been done in real time so every time a production starts, it's being released very soon after to keep the conversation with the audience in the present. It's a chronological storyline of an evolution, from the very beginning up to now. I think the Internet is the place where you can do that. kin is tying those two works together in the sense that it's a physical thing that you can touch also."

The core of iamamiwhoami is the music, where the lyrics are "the script for the story happening and being shared in real time". "Blending them together they create a new way of communicating for me. kin can be experienced either sonically, visually or merged depending on what is preferred", Lee said. She defines iamamiwhoami as a multimedia "entity", which also includes directors, designers and close friends. "Leaving space for everyone's imagination to run free is a big part of it, both in terms of how we communicate and also in not being overly clear what the message is. It's kind of like receiving a script for a movie and reading it while you're watching it." According to Lee, the reason behind iamamiwhoami's initial anonymity is that she was unsure as to what she wanted the project to be. "I wanted to create undisturbed away from the noise together with my collaborators. It was necessary to work in the quiet for iamamiwhoami to be able to continue to have a life. My identity was not hidden but neither articulated by me because what is relevant is the work we have done and the audience reflection of my identity." She added that she did not give interviews earlier because she felt "[i]t would have all looked like a big promotional campaign. I would have been a sad person for a long time. I can't say that I would have been here now. But it's evolved in a way that we can still do it."

When questioned about the plain black cover of Kin in an interview with PopMatters, Lee commented that the album was "packaged in a shape suited for consumption. The shape iamamiwhoami needed to adopt to be able to deliver it. The cover of kin is the portrait of the black box [featured at the end of the video for 'Goods', and the end of the Kin film proper]. The simple may not seem grand at first glance but looking closer at its contents can be rewarding, depending on if you choose to experience it from the inside or the outside of its boundaries."

== Critical reception ==
Professional ratings
Aggregate scores
| Source | Rating |
|---|---|
| Metacritic | 74/100 |
Review scores
| Source | Rating |
| AllMusic | 4/5 stars |
| Consequence of Sound | C+ |
| DIY | 8/10 |
| The Line of Best Fit | 8.5/10 stars |
| musicOMH | 4/5 stars |
| Pitchfork | 7.6/10 |
| Sputnikmusic | 3.5/5 |
| Time Out London | 4/5 stars |
| Uncut | 8/10 |

Kin received generally positive reviews from music critics. At Metacritic, which assigns a normalised rating out of 100 to reviews from mainstream publications, the album received an average score of 74, based on 10 reviews. AllMusic editor Heather Phares commented that "[w]hile there's a similarly Scandinavian air of witchy electro-pop mystery akin to Björk and [Karin] Dreijer's work on many of [the album's] songs, Lee finds her own niche within this territory", adding that the album "shows that there's more than just gimmickry to iamamiwhoami." Alex Yau of DIY wrote, "Having created a brilliantly slick debut of dance and electro-pop, Jonna Lee has thrust herself out of the shadows and directly into the limelight. Kin is a hypnotic album on its own merit and needs no elaborate campaign to stand out." Jon Hadusek of Consequence of Sound opined that Lee and Björklund's production "darts stealthily between Portishead-style trip hop and pulsing techno", concluding that "iamamiwhoami is a powerhouse, and they have the songs (and videos) to prove it." Ben Hogwood of musicOMH compared Lee's voice to those of Elizabeth Fraser and Siouxsie Sioux, while noting that "[t]he only caveat with the music of iamamiwhoami is that there is now a lot of R&B influenced electronic pop music around, increasingly from Scandinavia, and it seems to be the 'go to' sound of left of centre pop music in the middle of 2012. The good news for the duo, however, is that their particular take on it puts them right near the front of a crowded field." Evan Sawdey of PopMatters depicted kin as an experimental pop album.

Kim Taylor Bennett of Time Out London stated that "each glacial electro-pop track is matched by an equally unsettling video. Crucially, though, these elegant songs stand up even when stripped of their filmic storylines. In either form, they're really quite magical." Pitchfork's Katherine St. Asaph found that "Kin is not an assertive album, nor is it surprising, but it's as solid an aesthetic as you can expect of two artists mostly new to this genre." Sputnikmusic's Nick Butler expressed that the album's sequencing "doesn't make the most of its strengths, making some of the repetition seem like a lack of ideas rather than thematic consistency", but claimed that "in all other regards, this is a beautiful album to stick on and just drift away to—this is music of impressive texture and depth [...] This is a highlight of 2012, but if she stays on this path, the next one could well be a highlight of the decade." Danny Wadeson of The Line of Best Fit commented, "Flowing smoothly through playful and jubilant to more sinister, pulsing, and tense, [Lee's] ear for an arresting arrangement is matched only by her flair for surprising you with a dramatic change from one track to the next without it ever feeling contrived or jarring." BBC Music's Alex Denney wrote that Kin "must be judged on its merits as an album, and it's a fine if not especially memorable set of off-beam synth-pop tunes", but felt that "while kin is solidly crafted throughout, there's nothing to justify the lofty artistic conceits surrounding it." Similarly, Terence Caron of State argued that "musically Iamamiwhoami is far from being the far-out innovative girl she tries to present on screen, though she does have talent for pushing Swedish fellow artist Fever Ray's dark synthetic sounds into more danceable grounds and make straight-forward pop tunes. Without watching her videos, the songs of Iamamiwhoami jolt the imagination."

=== Accolades ===
The album was nominated for "The Best Tease of the Past 12 Months" by the BBC 6 Music Blog Awards, with fellow contenders being Lana Del Rey, Elliphant, Battlekat, Savoir Adore and The Sound of Arrows. On 2 March 2012, iamamiwhoami were announced as the winners of the award. Bryan Konietzko, the co-creator of the American animated television series Avatar: The Last Airbender, praised the "Sever" video on his Tumblr page, commenting, "Watching all of their videos and their site-specific performance is like getting a rare view into a world where art isn't hindered by economics and time constraints. I want to go to that world." In June 2012, iamamiwhoami won the Digital Genius Award at the O Music Awards. Kin was featured as BBC 6 Music's Album of the Day on 6 September 2012. PopMatters ranked the track "Play" at number 55 on its list of The 75 Best Songs of 2012, calling it "an emotionally naked track that sounds like absolutely nothing else before it [...] 'Play' is a stone cold classic that you only have to hear once before falling under its incredible charms."

== Promotion ==
In June 2012, iamamiwhoami's website To whom it may concern. was updated to include a tour section, revealing a European tour with live performances in Sweden, Germany, Poland and the United Kingdom. The music videos of Kin were screened as a film at festivals and cinemas throughout parts of Europe. This was iamamiwhoami's first tour and first performances since their Way Out West Festival live debut in August 2011. iamamiwhoami's sold-out debut in the United Kingdom for the Ether Festival at London's Southbank Centre received an encore and standing ovation from the audience.

=== Tour dates ===
| Date | City | Country | Event |
|---|---|---|---|
Europe
| 5 August 2012 | Stockholm | Sweden | Stockholm Music & Arts |
| 10 August 2012 | Helsinki | Finland | Flow Festival (film screening) |
| 10–12 August 2012 | Castelbuono | Italy | Ypsigrock Festival (film screening) |
| 13 August 2012 | Gräfenhainichen | Germany | Melt! Festival (film screening) |
| 19, 22 August 2012 | Stockholm | Sweden | Biograf Victoria (film screening) |
| 25 August 2012 | Stockholm | Sweden | Popaganda |
| 8 September 2012 | Berlin | Germany | Berlin Festival |
| 10 October 2012 | London | England | Ether Festival |
| 13 October 2012 | Warsaw | Poland | FreeFormFestival |

== Track listing ==
All lyrics are written by Jonna Lee; all tracks are written by Lee and Claes Björklund.

| No. | Title | Length |
|---|---|---|
| 1. | "Sever" | 3:58 |
| 2. | "Drops" | 4:43 |
| 3. | "Good Worker" | 4:57 |
| 4. | "Play" | 5:14 |
| 5. | "In Due Order" | 3:23 |
| 6. | "Idle Talk" | 4:52 |
| 7. | "Rascal" | 4:46 |
| 8. | "Kill" | 6:26 |
| 9. | "Goods" | 5:10 |

=== Notes ===
- All track titles are stylised in all lowercase.

== Personnel ==
Credits adapted from Cooperative Music Italy's Twitter page and To whom it may concern. website.

=== Music ===
- Jonna Lee – vocals
- Claes Björklund – production
- Dan Smith – mastering

=== Visuals ===
- Jonna Lee – production
- Robin Kempe-Bergman – direction
- Agustín Moreaux – costume design, makeup, set design
- Klara Bjärkstedt – costume design
- John Strandh – cinematography, still photography

== Release history ==
Kin
| Region | Date | Format | Label | Ref(s) |
|---|---|---|---|---|
| Various (except the United States) | 11 June 2012 | Digital download | To whom it may concern.; Cooperative | |
| United States | 12 June 2012 | Digital download | To whom it may concern.; Cooperative | |
| Netherlands | 31 August 2012 | CD+DVD; LP+DVD | To whom it may concern.; Cooperative | |
| Sweden | 3 September 2012 | CD+DVD; LP+DVD | To whom it may concern.; Cooperative | |
| United Kingdom | 3 September 2012 | CD+DVD; LP+DVD | To whom it may concern.; Cooperative | |
| Australia | 7 September 2012 | CD+DVD | To whom it may concern.; Cooperative | |
| Germany | 7 September 2012 | CD+DVD; LP+DVD | To whom it may concern.; Cooperative | |
| Italy | 7 September 2012 | CD+DVD; LP+DVD | To whom it may concern.; Cooperative | |
| France | 10 September 2012 | CD+DVD | To whom it may concern.; Cooperative | |
| United States | 6 November 2012 | CD+DVD; LP+DVD | To whom it may concern.; Cooperative | |

Chapters
| Release | Date | Format |
|---|---|---|
| "Kin 20120611" | 1 February 2012 | Video |
| "Sever" | 14 February 2012 | Video |
| "Sever" | 15 February 2012 | Digital single |
| "Drops" | 28 February 2012 | Video |
| "Drops" | 29 February 2012 | Digital single |
| "Good Worker" | 13 March 2012 | Video |
| "Good Worker" | 14 March 2012 | Digital single |
| "Play" | 27 March 2012 | Video |
| "Play" | 28 March 2012 | Digital single |
| "In Due Order" | 10 April 2012 | Video |
| "In Due Order" | 11 April 2012 | Digital single |
| "Idle Talk" | 24 April 2012 | Video |
| "Idle Talk" | 25 April 2012 | Digital single |
| "Rascal" | 8 May 2012 | Video |
| "Rascal" | 9 May 2012 | Digital single |
| "Kill" | 22 May 2012 | Video |
| "Kill" | 23 May 2012 | Digital single |
| "Goods" | 5 June 2012 | Video |
| "Goods" | 6 June 2012 | Digital single |
