= Blue (iamamiwhoami album) =

2014 album by iamamiwhoami

Studio album by iamamiwhoami
- Released: 7 November 2014
- Recorded: 2013–2014
- Genres: Electropop; synth-pop
- Length: 51:32
- Label: To whom it may concern.
- Director: Wave
- Producer: Claes Björklund

Iamamiwhoami chronology
Bounty (2013)	Blue (2014)	Concert in Blue (2015)

Singles from Blue
- 1. "Fountain" Released: 22 January 2014; 2. "Hunting for Pearls" Released: 26 February 2014; 3. "Vista" Released: 28 April 2014; 4. "Tap Your Glass" Released: 12 August 2014; 5. "Blue Blue" Released: 5 September 2014; 6. "Thin" Released: 2 October 2014; 7. "Chasing Kites" Released: 2 October 2014

Blue (stylised in all caps) is the third studio album by Swedish audiovisual project iamamiwhoami, led by singer and songwriter Jonna Lee. It was released on 7 November 2014 on Lee's label To whom it may concern. The album was announced on 8 July 2014 through a trailer on YouTube, and on the same day, it was made available for pre-order on To whom it may concern.'s website. Blue was musically produced by Claes Björklund and visually directed by Swedish collective Wave (Lee, John Strandh and Agustín Moreaux), with costume design by Mathieu Mirano.

== Release ==
Limited CD and 12-inch vinyl LP editions of Blue, as well as a CD and LP bundle, were made exclusively available via To whom it may concern.'s official online shop on 10 November 2014. All three editions include a 48-page book with lyrics and the Blue photo series.

An exclusive digital edition of the album, titled Blue Island, was released on 10 November 2014, taking the form of a website. Created by To whom it may concern. in collaboration with creators of the iamamiwhoami fansite iambountyfan, the Blue Island website and community home allows fans to either download or stream all parts of the album in high resolution (including audio, films, moving and still image series, and lyrics), as well as share the album's content with other users. A visitors' pass was also made available, giving fans streaming access only.

On 17 February 2015, an accompanying film premiered on Vimeo and on To whom it may concern.'s website, including the 10 visual episodes released throughout 2014, along with new material connecting the episodes, as well as a hidden bonus episode, "Dive". On the same day, the film was released on DVD as part of limited-edition bundles, along with the album on either CD or LP, or both.

== Critical reception ==
Professional ratings
Aggregate scores
Source	Rating
AnyDecentMusic?	6.8/10
Metacritic	73/100
Review scores
Source	Rating
AllMusic	4/5 stars
DIY	3/5 stars
Loud and Quiet	5/10
MusicOMH	3.5/5 stars
NME	7/10
Nothing but Hope and Passion	3.1/5
Pitchfork	6.1/10
PopMatters	8/10
Spectrum Culture	4.0/5
Uncut	6/10

Blue received generally positive reviews from music critics. At Metacritic, which assigns a normalised rating out of 100 to reviews from mainstream publications, the album received an average score of 73, based on 10 reviews. Evan Sawdey of PopMatters opined that Blue "isn't only the most satisfying record in the collective's discography; it's also one of the best albums released this year." Heather Phares of AllMusic concluded, "In its own way, this album might be Lee and Björklund's most balanced and unified work yet; it's certainly a confident journey into uncharted waters for the duo." Leonie Cooper of NME wrote, "At times [...] it feels like Lee has overdosed on the Drive soundtrack. Ultimately though, sensitivity outweighs '80s cliché." Alex Jeffery of musicOMH viewed that "while Blue's electropop soundscapes are hardly a great move forwards from their first two projects, there are genuinely majestic emotional moments to savour here." El Hunt of DIY noted that "Blue's watery explorations demonstrate an intriguing new facet to the project, but it might well come at the expense of the fearsome impact that earlier releases packed in the shedload."

Pitchfork's Sasha Geffen expressed that the album "encloses [Lee] in a space where she's far too safe", describing the song "Thin" as "a rare moment of intrigue on an album that's generous in its beauty while leaving little to wonder about, a sky that never rains." Miriam Wallbaum of Nothing but Hope and Passion praised Blue as "an elaborated total work of art, consisting of strong videos and harmonious pop-melodies", but suggested that "the music doesn't work on its own: leaving out the visuality, the record is only another ordinary standard pop album." Chris Watkeys of Loud and Quiet concurred, commenting on how "[t]he visual aspect of the project is so superbly expressive that it feels churlish to denounce something so brave, ambitious, and visually compelling, but the music does need to stand up by itself, and it only occasionally does so". At Uncut, Graeme Thomson felt that "between their 2012 debut, Kin, and their latest, Blue, the Stockholm duo have lost some of their Fever Ray-like ability to surprise and unsettle. Stripped of the visual element, what remains here is sparkling Nordic synth-pop, uplifting and accessible, but increasingly conventional."

== Track listing ==
All lyrics are written by Jonna Lee; all tracks are written by Lee and Claes Björklund.

Standard digital edition
No.	Title	Length
1.	"Fountain"	6:00
2.	"Hunting for Pearls"	5:16
3.	"Vista"	5:04
4.	"Tap Your Glass"	5:14
5.	"Blue Blue"	5:27
6.	"Thin"	5:33
7.	"Chasing Kites"	5:11
8.	"Ripple"	3:35
9.	"The Last Dancer"	4:48
10.	"Shadowshow"	5:24
Total length:		51:32

Limited CD and LP editions
No.	Title	Length
1.	"Fountain"	6:09
2.	"Hunting for Pearls" (includes hidden segue, "Pearl")	5:41
3.	"Vista" (includes hidden segue, "Melter")	5:16
4.	"Tap Your Glass"	5:21
5.	"Blue Blue"	5:23
6.	"Thin"	5:33
7.	"Chasing Kites"	5:02
8.	"Ripple" (includes hidden segue, "Arrival")	4:51
9.	"The Last Dancer"	4:40
10.	"Shadowshow"	5:39
Total length:		52:47

Blue Island (digital edition)
No.	Title	Length
1.	"Wave"	0:39
2.	"Fountain"	6:00
3.	"Hunting for Pearls"	5:16
4.	"Pearl"	0:59
5.	"Vista"	5:04
6.	"Melter"	0:27
7.	"Tap Your Glass"	5:14
8.	"Afloat"	0:31
9.	"Blue Blue"	5:27
10.	"Thin"	5:33
11.	"Air"	0:17
12.	"Chasing Kites"	5:11
13.	"Ripple"	3:35
14.	"Arrival" (also titled "Blue Lake")	1:24
15.	"The Last Dancer"	4:47
16.	"Shadowshow"	5:24
17.	"Dive"	4:29
18.	"Blue Continuous"	52:52
Total length:		113:09

=== Notes ===
- All track titles are stylised in lowercase letters.

== Personnel ==
Credits adapted from the liner notes of Blue.

=== Music ===
- Jonna Lee – instruments, mixing, vocals
- Claes Björklund – instruments, mixing, production, vocals
- Dan Smith – mastering

=== Visuals ===
- Klara Bjärkstedt – additional costume
- Chris Higham – technical film team
- Beatrice Johansson – visual production coordination
- Viktor Kumlin – technical film team
- Mathieu Mirano – costume
- Björn Olin – technical film team
- Wave – post-production, visual material direction
- Jonna Lee – executive music and visual production
- Agustín Moreaux – additional costume
- John Strandh – cinematography, still photography

=== Artwork ===
- Jan Scharlau – artwork, graphic design

== Charts ==
Chart performance for Blue
Chart (2014)	Peak position
US Top Dance Albums (Billboard)	16
US Heatseekers Albums (Billboard)	34

== Release history ==
Region	Date	Format(s)	Label	Ref.
Australia	7 November 2014	Digital download	To whom it may concern.	
Germany	7 November 2014	Digital download	To whom it may concern.	
Ireland	7 November 2014	Digital download	To whom it may concern.	
France	10 November 2014	Digital download	To whom it may concern.	
United Kingdom	10 November 2014	Digital download	To whom it may concern.	
Various	10 November 2014	CD (Note: Available exclusively via To whom it may concern.'s website); LP; CD+LP; Blue Island digital download	To whom it may concern.	
United States	11 November 2014	Digital download	To whom it may concern.	
Sweden	12 November 2014	Digital download	To whom it may concern.	
Various	17 February 2015	CD+DVD; LP+DVD; CD+LP+DVD	To whom it may concern.	
