= Artist Growth =

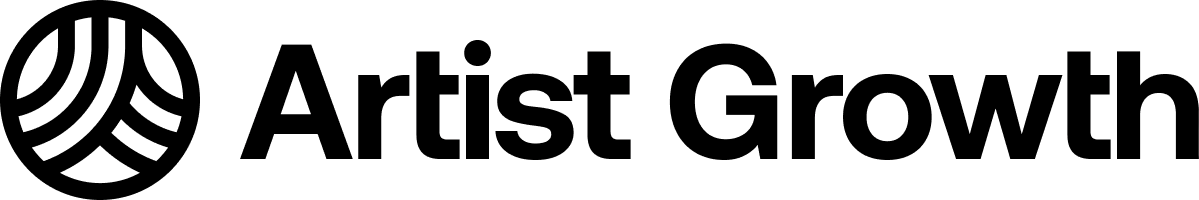
- Type: Private
- Industry: Music technology, SaaS
- Founded: 2011, Nashville, Tennessee
- Founders: Matt Urmy, Jonathan Sexton
- Headquarters: Nashville, Tennessee, United States
- Key people: Matt Urmy (Co-founder & CEO)
- Website: artistgrowth.com

Artist Growth is an American software company headquartered in Nashville, Tennessee, that develops a management platform for the music industry. The company was founded in 2011 by singer-songwriter and entrepreneur Matt Urmy and Jonathan Sexton. A prototype launched in 2012 and a desktop version followed in 2013. In 2018, Pinnacle Financial Partners announced an investment in the company.

== History ==
=== Founding and early development ===
Matt Urmy, a Nashville-based singer-songwriter who had toured and recorded throughout the 2000s, co-founded Artist Growth with Jonathan Sexton in 2011. Urmy has described the impetus for the company as frustration with the industry's reliance on disconnected spreadsheets, email chains, and paper documents to manage artists' business operations.

The company launched publicly in early 2012 at an event held at the Country Music Hall of Fame in Nashville, attended by artists including Vince Gill, Steve Winwood, Buddy Miller, and Bill Lloyd, as well as Nashville Mayor Karl Dean. Cowboy Jack Clement performed at the launch. Speaking to Billboard at the event, Urmy described the platform's purpose: "The higher up they are, the more they want data. So you can quantify how far you've come."

A desktop version of the platform was released in 2013. Billboard profiled Artist Growth the following year in its Music Cities feature on the future of Nashville's technology sector. In October 2012, co-founder Matt Urmy was named to Forbes's "Up and Comers" list.

=== Growth and institutional adoption ===
In May 2018, Pinnacle Financial Partners, a Nashville-based bank with a dedicated music, entertainment, and sports division, announced it had taken a stake in Artist Growth. That same year, the company integrated with tour booking agency Rising Star Travel to streamline tour scheduling workflows.

=== Platform evolution ===
In 2023, Hypepotamus described the platform as having evolved into a tool that helps musicians "think like startup entrepreneurs," noting its adoption across major label structures.

== Ownership and investment ==
Artist Growth is a privately held company headquartered in Nashville, Tennessee.

The company's early investors included Nashville-based physician and philanthropist Harry Jacobson, former Sony Music Nashville chairman Joe Galante, and Joe Glaser, among others. A seed round of approximately $2 million was documented in 2013. SEC Form D filings were made in 2012 and 2016, though the results of those raises were not publicly disclosed. As of March 2018, state records indicated 56 member-owners of the company.

In May 2018, Pinnacle Financial Partners, a Nashville-based bank with a dedicated music, entertainment, and sports division, announced an equity investment in the company. At the time of the investment, Artist Growth reported approximately 18 employees and 20,000 users.
