= Bounty (album) =

2013 album by iamamiwhoami

Studio album by iamamiwhoami
- Released: 3 June 2013
- Recorded: 2010–2011
- Genre: Electropop; experimental pop
- Length: 43:22
- Label: To whom it may concern.; Cooperative
- Director: Robin Kempe-Bergman
- Producer: Claes Björklund

Iamamiwhoami chronology
Kin (2012)	Bounty (2013)	Blue (2014)

Bounty (stylised in all lowercase) is the second studio album by Swedish audiovisual project iamamiwhoami, led by singer and songwriter Jonna Lee. Originally produced and released as a series of singles throughout 2010 and 2011, it was later released as an album on 3 June 2013 on Lee's label To whom it may concern. and distributed by Cooperative Music. The first music video from Bounty, titled "B", was released on 14 March 2010 on iamamiwhoami's YouTube channel, after which followed "O", "U-1", "U-2", "N", "T" and "Y". Digital singles were released shortly after each music video is uploaded to YouTube. The titles collectively formed the word "bounty". While it was assumed that these songs solely consisted of Bounty's track listing, in 2011 two more singles and music videos, "; John" and "Clump", were released and were not confirmed as belonging to Bounty until June 2012 when iamamiwhoami's YouTube channel grouped them into a playlist named Bounty along with the previous tracks mentioned.

On 4 December 2012, iamamiwhoami's label website To whom it may concern. was updated with a note on the front page which stated "20130603 – iamamiwhoami; bounty", forecasting a physical release of the Bounty series. This was confirmed on the very next day when the "Release" section of the website displayed Bounty's album cover art, along with its track listing. Aside from a digital release, the album was released in two physical formats—a CD and DVD bundle and an LP and DVD bundle.

== Critical reception ==
Professional ratings
Aggregate scores
Source	Rating
Metacritic	71/100
Review scores
Source	Rating
AllMusic	4/5 stars
Consequence of Sound	C+
DIY	6/10
Drowned in Sound	7/10
musicOMH	4/5 stars

Bounty received generally positive reviews from music critics. At Metacritic, which assigns a normalised rating out of 100 to reviews from mainstream publications, the album received an average score of 71, based on seven reviews. Heather Phares of AllMusic wrote that "there's a lot to enjoy" on the album, adding that "bounty was made to create mystique and interest, and it still does that even after iamamiwhoami's secret wasn't one anymore." Aaron Payne of musicOMH lauded the album as "wonderfully idiosyncratic" and viewed it as "an album to be continually surprised by, for those who already know it as well as those who don't, especially if it's given the chance to perform on video as well as vinyl."

Sasha Geffen of Consequence of Sound opined, "As spectacular as the visuals are, the project's core is the music", calling Bounty "a lively collection of electro-pop that does lots with its limited palette." Jon Clark of Drowned in Sound commented, "It may be somewhat on the lofty, artistic side, but bounty manages somehow to avoid ostentation; it is largely elegant, grounded and rewarding." Julia Sachs of Slug implied that "with their dreamy vocals and experimental pop sound, iamamiwhoami deliver an album that will please many different types of music lovers. In a mixed review, Tom Watts of DIY described the album as "a joyful exploration of synthy soundscapes and haunting vocals", but concluded that "bounty is a record that, whilst great to vibe out to, kind of feels a little stitched together piecemeal."

== Promotion ==
As with Kin, the group embarked upon a worldwide tour in order to promote the album, including their first North American performances.

Date	City	Country	Event
Europe
19 May 2013	Barcelona	Spain	Razzmatazz
30 May 2013	London	England	Electric Brixton
1 June 2013	Dublin	Ireland	Forbidden Fruit Festival
30 June 2013	Moscow	Russia	Park Live Festival
12 July 2013	Trenčín	Slovakia	Pohoda
19 July 2013	Gräfenhainichen	Germany	Melt! Festival
21 July 2013	Southwold	England	Latitude Festival
18 August 2013	Gdańsk	Poland	Soundrive Festival
22 September 2013	Oakdale	United States	Symbiosis Gathering
24 September 2013	Brooklyn	United States	Brooklyn Masonic Temple

== Track listing ==
All lyrics written by Jonna Lee; all tracks written by Lee and Claes Björklund.

No.	Title	Length
1.	"B"	3:29
2.	"O"	6:37
3.	"U-1"	2:39
4.	"U-2"	3:41
5.	"N"	4:35
6.	"T"	4:39
7.	"Y"	6:37
8.	"; John"	6:39
9.	"Clump"	4:27

=== Notes ===
- All track titles are stylised in all lowercase. For example, "U-1" is stylised as "u-1" and "; John" is stylised as "; john".

== Personnel ==
Credits adapted from To whom it may concern. website.

=== Music ===
- Jonna Lee – vocals
- Claes Björklund – production
- Dan Smith – mastering

=== Visuals ===
- Jonna Lee – production
- Robin Kempe-Bergman – direction
- John Strandh – cinematography
- Agustín Moreaux – production design, styling, costumes
- Klara Bjärkstedt – costumes
