= PIAS Cooperative =

[PIAS] Cooperative
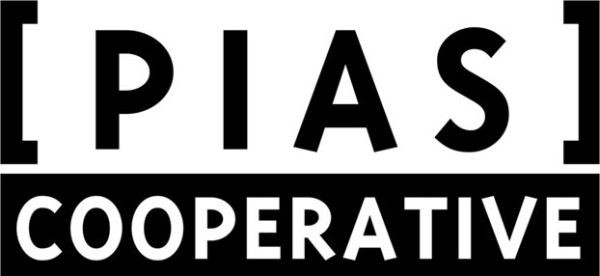
- Parent company: PIAS Group
- Founded: 2005
- Defunct: 2018; 7 years ago
- Status: Absorbed into PIAS Group
- Distributor: PIAS Group
- Country of origin: United Kingdom
- Location: London

[PIAS] Cooperative, formerly Cooperative Music, often referred to as Co-Op, was a group of indie labels based in the UK but that have offices around the world, owned by [PIAS].

Through their partner labels [PIAS] Cooperative worked with artists such as iamamiwhoami, Phoenix, Bloc Party, The Knife, Fleet Foxes, Prinzhorn Dance School, Citizens!, Interpol, The Black Keys and Mumford & Sons.

== History ==
In April 2005, Cooperative Music was set up by the V2 Music Group as a transnational marketing and distribution operation which licenses independent labels, as opposed to individual artist companies which is the standard industry practice, for release in Europe, Australia and Japan. This in-house licensing division has an exclusive international marketing team with representation in the UK, Ireland, France, Germany, Italy, Spain, Holland, Belgium, Sweden, Norway, Denmark, Australia and Japan.

In February 2013 [PIAS] acquired Co-Op from Universal Music Group.

In 2018, PIAS Cooperative was absorbed into PIAS Group, PIAS Cooperative brand is used in its sales on PIAS website.

In 2024, financially badly harmed PIAS (including Cooperative Music) was bought again by Universal.

== Former Partner labels ==
- 37 Adventures
- Acid Jazz Records
- ATO Records
- Bella Union
- DFA Records
- Heavenly Recordings
- Mute Records
- Phantasy
- Point of Departure
- Research
- Transgressive Records
- Wichita Recordings
- V2 Records
