= Iamamiwhoami =

Swedish singer-songwriter

iamamiwhoami
- Origin: Stockholm, Sweden
- Genres: Electronic; electropop; synth-pop; art pop; avant-garde
- Years active: 2009–2017, 2022–present
- Label: To whom it may concern
- Members: Jonna Lee; Claes Björklund
- Website: youtube.com/iamamiwhoami

iamamiwhoami (/ˌaɪæm.æmaɪˈhuːæmaɪ/ EYE-am-am-eye-HOO-am-eye) is a Swedish electronic music and audiovisual project with ARG elements led by singer-songwriter Jonna Lee in collaboration with producer Claes Björklund. Since 2009, the project has released a series of audiovisual works on their YouTube channel, which has garnered an international following. Visual collaborators include Swedish director Robin Kempe-Bergman (until 2013) and the visual collective Wave, which comprises Lee and cinematographer John Strandh, along with former member Agustín Moreaux.

The project's initial anonymous videos spread virally, leading to a significant cult following. In 2010, Lee founded a record label, To whom it may concern, to manage the project's releases. One video, titled "y", gained over 68 million views by October 2023, partly due to its unique position as the first link returned by Google if the word "youtube" is not fully typed into the browser.

iamamiwhoami released their debut physical album, the audiovisual album Kin, in June 2012, while the initial full-length series, Bounty (2010–2011), was released physically in June 2013. A third album, Blue, was released in November 2014. By March 2024, a total of 87 videos have been released on iamamiwhoami's YouTube channel.

The project has also remixed songs for Moby and The Irrepressibles, as well as performing live in concert tours revolving around the releases of Kin, Bounty and Blue. An online performance art "concert" in support of the Bounty series was streamed online in 2010, taking place in a forest. On 29 April 2015, a second online performance art "concert" in support of the Blue series was streamed online; this "concert" was released physically and digitally in September 2015 as Concert in Blue, and includes the first new iamamiwhoami song ("The Deadlock") since 2014.

In March 2017, Lee embarked on solo career as ionnalee, stating that it is continuation of iamamiwhoami, though "the two projects will not exist simultaneously".

In March 2022, Lee announced a new audiovisual album from iamamiwhoami, Be Here Soon, which was released on 3 June 2022.

== Background ==
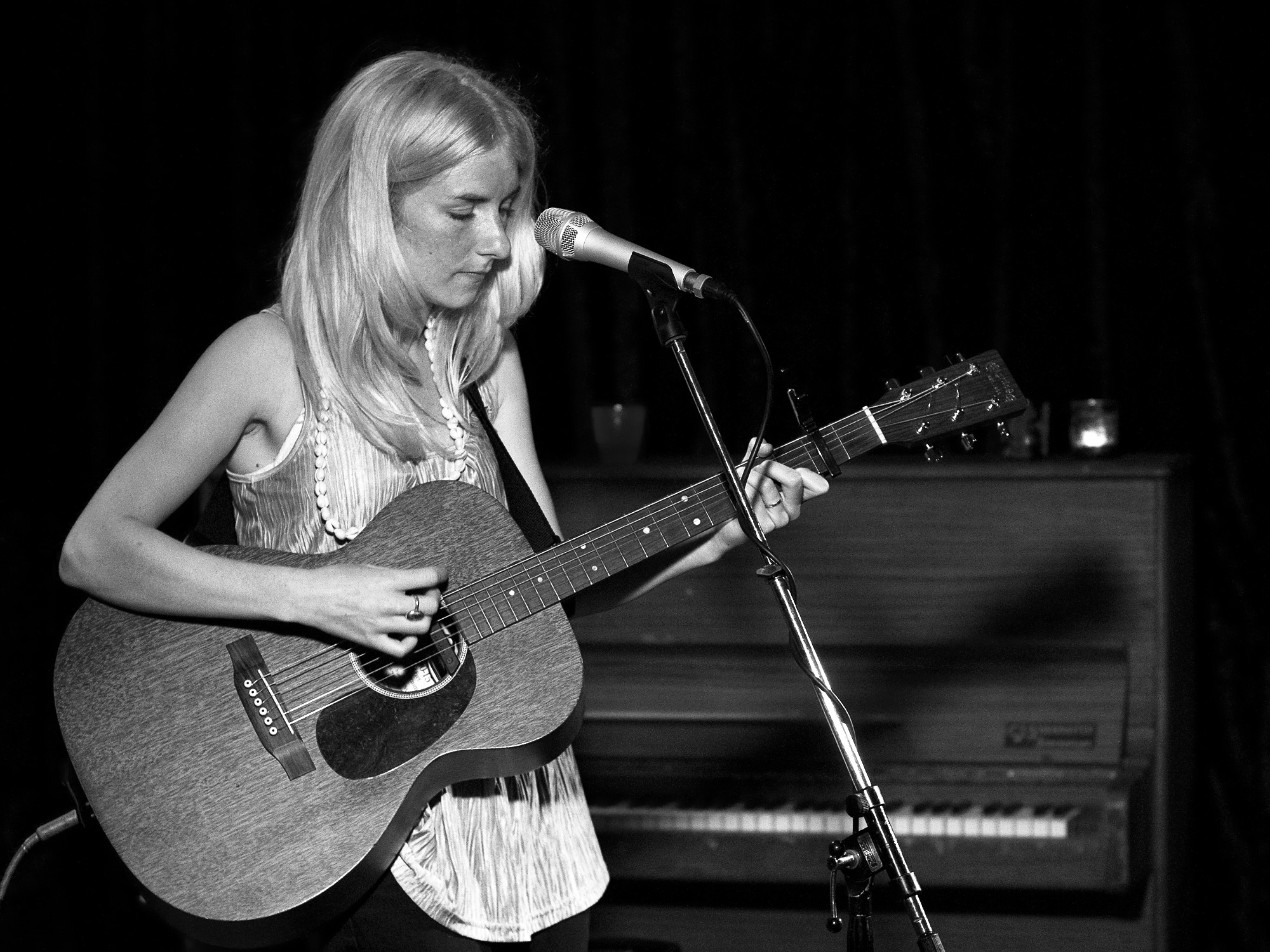
Lee, seen performing here in 2008, developed iamamiwhoami with Björklund after the release of her second album in 2009

iamamiwhoami is a collaboration between Swedish singer-songwriter Jonna Lee and producer Claes Björklund. In an interview with Playgroundmag.net, Lee explained that iamamiwhoami was conceived as a response to "experiencing convention in its purest form," referencing her earlier solo work. The project's musical and visual style represents a significant shift from the guitar-driven alternative pop of her solo career, though Lee notes that "the change is probably more apparent from an external point of view." Lee began developing iamamiwhoami in 2009 and started creating the music together with Björklund in real time with their releases in 2009–2010. Lee has explained they wanted it to "grow freely and [tear] the formerly [sic] by its roots and start over", envisioning the ability to "physically visualize" their songs. Lee began collaborating with visual directors Robin Kempe-Bergman, Agustín Moreaux, still photographer John Strandh, and most recently, fashion and costume designer Mathieu Mirano, who are credited as part of the visual team of iamamiwhoami, and Lee has defined the collective as being herself in a "collaboration with amazing people" that she loves, also stating "iamamiwhoami is not something [she] can shake off." The process of forming iamamiwhoami began with "a need of change" and the fact that there were songs already in development. Lee has acknowledged they are working with limited means independently through her label To whom it may concern to maintain their creative freedom.

Since the upload of their first video to YouTube, the project's videos and music have been continuous and operate in "real time", and each song is completed just before being made available for viewing. The first upload, "Prelude 699130082.451322" surfaced on YouTube in December 2009 and was the beginning of a since abstract storyline. Lee has said of this process "every time a production starts, it's being released very soon after to keep the conversation with the audience in the present. It's a chronological storyline of an evolution, from the very beginning up to now. I think the Internet is the place where you can do that." Lee states that essentially, "the core of iamamiwhoami is our music, where the lyrics are the script for the story happening and being shared in real time. Then from that, it is expanded with imagery that reflects our development and current state as part of our chronological storyline." Lee has expressed desire to break "the wall" between viewers and listeners.

iamamiwhoami is widely known for its initial secrecy. As such, Lee's participation was not confirmed until August 2011, when she began giving her first interviews regarding the project. Lee has stated the project's name (pronounced I am, am I, who am I) was inspired by the fact that she "didn't really know what she wanted iamamiwhoami to be." Lee finds that her "identity was not hidden but neither articulated by me because what is relevant is the work we have done and the audience reflection of my identity. " Although Lee acknowledges that secrecy is essential, she feels there is "a lot of communication from me [to the audience] all the time even though it's not literal." Although "people realised pretty quickly that [she] was involved", she "chose not to comment on it, because [she] just wanted people to focus on what [they] were doing", and to speak about who she is "as an individual, doesn't feel relevant".

== History ==
=== 2009–2011: First uploads, ARG start, and Bounty ===
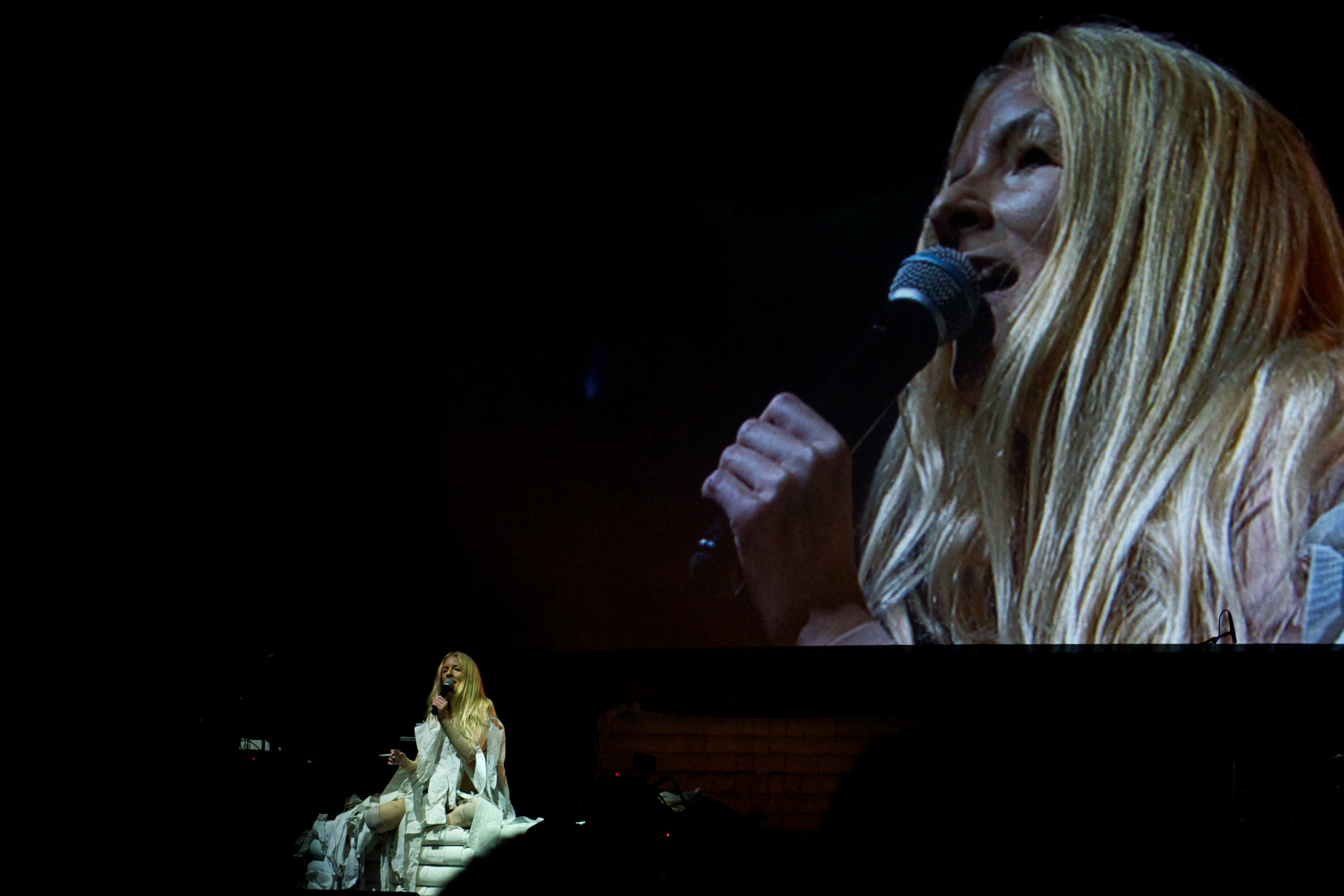
iamamiwhoami's first concert before a live audience at Way Out West portrayed their unconventional performance style and featured Lee singing to the audience on a bed made of toilet rolls. The audience being filmed and projected, watching themselves during the concert. The appearance continues the events in the videos of "; john" and "clump" that were released simultaneously to the Way out west performance.

The first two iamamiwhoami videos were uploaded to YouTube on 4 December 2009, and were forwarded from an anonymous email account to a number of music journalists and blogs. These videos continued and featured an unknown blonde woman whose face had been distorted, and displayed themes such as birthing and growth. Imagery associated with the folklore of the mandragora (the flowering humanoid, berries, dogs used to pull out the mandrake, and semen of a hanged man) recurs throughout iamamiwhoami's videos. Each of the first six clips end with a drawing of a different animal (a goat, owl, whale, bee, llama, and monkey). Having blogged about the videos, MTV journalist James Montgomery received a package by a messenger, which included a lock of blond hair, a piece of bark, and a pictogram of the six animals with the question "Says what?" Furthering the mystery; the sixth video ("23.5.12.3.15.13.5–8.15.13.5.3383") ends with the woman whispering "Why" or "Y." Each video displayed a numerical code as part of its title. When indexed into the alphabet, these spell out words such as "educational", "I am", "its me", "mandragora", "officinarum", and "welcome home". Mandragora officinarum refers to the mandrake root, which when fresh or dry may cause hallucination and grows from a hanged man's sperm . In 2012, Lee revealed their aim is to "let the work be in focus and push the boundaries of convention in different forms." This initial stage of the project received positive, if sceptical reviews and many websites found themselves asking readers to guess the identity of the blonde woman within the clips. iamamiwhoami was speculated to be a project of many artists, including Lady Gaga, Goldfrapp, Björk, The Knife, Trent Reznor and Christina Aguilera. The number series which were highly stylized teaser videos setting the tone of the project, established several mysteries, and served to foreshadow the projects' complete songs. For instance, "23.5.12.3.15.13.5–8.15.13.5.3383" contained vocally distorted lyrics that later appeared in the later song "o". On 25 November 2017, a full version of "13.1.14.4.18.1.7.15.18.1.1110" was released under the side project ionnalee, featuring the distorted full verse as the main chorus of the song "GONE"

The second "series" of the iamamiwhoami project began with the upload of a full song and music video titled "b", one month following the final prelude video. Garnering positive reviews for its dramatic change in style and heavy use of a piano as well as vocal distortion techniques, the song was the first to be uploaded to the iTunes Store, being offered as a paid digital download on 15 March 2010. Although a "reveal" of the artist behind the moniker was anticipated, the videos showed a clearer view of Jonna Lee's face. Swedish media recognized Lee. However, Lee's previous North American management team Philadelphonic commented "If Jonna is involved in this, we have no knowledge of such." Despite this, her involvement in the project was eventually thought to be confirmed with the release of the video for "t", in which her face was fully revealed without any makeup or distortion to conceal her identity. According to rraurl.com and MTV Brasil, "o" was directed by Viktor Kumlin, who is also the director of Lee's music video for "Something So Quiet". This proved to be false. As the seven videos with letter titles were slowly released, fans gathered that the videos were likely to spell the word "Bounty". Each of the seven videos begins with the corresponding sound of the animal, however, the animal sounds are not present in the released tracks. The conclusion of the live performance art event IN CONCERT of 2010 reveals that the onomatopoeia used to represent the animals' calls can be made to approximate the pronunciation of the English word "Bounty". On 7 February 2011, several registered songs on ISWC were discovered to be closely related to iamamiwhoami. For example, songs titled, "Up!/Higher", "The Sound of Letting Go/Love", and "Little Hope/Sing a Song of Fire" all pertain to lyrics in iamamiwhoami's songs, "b", "o", and "y", respectively. The works were registered by Lee and Claes Björklund. These songs were registered around the same time as several songs from Lee's This Is Jonna Lee 2009 album.

In October 2010, iamamiwhoami requested a volunteer from the audience to be presented to them with their full name through a message video; no instructions followed. Fans of the project set up voting polls and presented a volunteer from the YouTube community with the YouTube username of ShootUpTheStation. One month later, on 16 November 2010, a live online concert was streamed on To whom it may concern's website where ShootUpTheStation was led through the forests of iamamiwhoami by Lee and brought to be buried and burned inside a paper box. In Concert featured performances of both the preludes, Bounty and a new song titled "." and ran at one hour and four minutes.

In August 2011, iamamiwhoami played their first live show at the annual Way Out West Festival in Gothenburg, Sweden. After a long absence, they released the songs "; John" and "Clump" which was revealed to be an epilogue to Bounty. As a conclusion to Bounty, Bullett Media posted an interview article with iamamiwhoami for their Winter 2011 'Secrets' Issue. Questions were answered strictly with sampled lyrics from the current repertoire of songs, with some additional and unknown phrases purported to be lyrics for future musical releases. The article also included promotional images of iamamiwhoami, nude in the forest and posed among similar elements from "; John" and "T". The article is referenced to be written and photographed by iamamiwhoami. Following their performance at Way Out West, iamamiwhoami began recording and preparing their debut studio album.

Bounty was critically well received, with Kathy Iandoli of MTV describing Bounty as having "portrayed a flaxen, ethereal goddess twisting her way throughout nature, while other [videos] included distorted imagery that housed industrial, synthy soundscapes set on fire. The combination was mysterious, yet alluring, representing a combination of horror film imagery with new age sensibilities. The titles to the songs were equally vague, ... numbers and clusters of words .... The videos never fell short of several hundred thousand views – and even much greater ... people obviously took notice." At the Swedish Grammis held in January 2011, iamamiwhoami won their first award in the category of "Innovator of the Year" (Swedish: Årets innovatör), which had been newly inaugurated. An anonymous woman, later confirmed to be Nina Fors, the mother of Emil Fors, a Swedish musician who worked as production manager for the videos, received the award on their behalf and handed to the speaker an envelope with the words "To whom it may concern." taped in front. The content is revealed to be an empty piece of white paper. Before leaving, the woman acknowledged by saying, "Thank you. That's all I can say". iamamiwhoami won an MTV O Music award in 2012 in the "Digital Genius" category.

=== 2012–2013: Kin ===
On 1 February 2012, iamamiwhoami's YouTube channel once again became active with the posting of the video "kin 20120611", which was sent to music blogs and contained interactive elevents much in the same manner as the original release. This continued with each successive release in the Kin series. It was speculated that the title of the video pertained to the date 11 June 2012, using the Gregorian big-endian dating system most common in Sweden. The video was followed by the original music video in the Kin series, titled "Sever", later the opening track on iamamiwhoami's debut studio album. The series consists of nine songs and videos, which culminates in "Goods" and is a continuation of the story arc founded by the original uploads, online concert and Bounty series. Together, the videos form a collective film also titled Kin which was released in CD/DVD and has been screened at several European film festivals. A digital download of each song was released to retailers one day following the YouTube upload. In terms of imagery, much of Kin contains large hairy creatures which interact with Lee throughout the narrative, which she explained as "represent[ing] a part of me and most others. Life with it is very much a delight. I have experienced the consequences of living without it." The release resulted in the first interviews conducted by Lee in promotion of the album, for the first time describing the process of creating the iamamiwhoami visuals and music. She referred to the making of Kin in an interview with The Guardian as having been "nine months of hard labour". Lee has also explained Kin "came to life after a close encounter with the audience at the first live concert in 2011" and called herself a "proud mother".

In preparation for the release, iamamiwhoami were signed to Cooperative Music, a British group of independent labels founded by V2 Records. The Italian branch of the label was the first to announce the release of the series as an album, which would be audiovisual and distributed both physically and via digital download on 11 June 2012. and originating from the project's own label, "To whom it may concern.", a recurring phrase within both their videos and single artwork. This coincided with the launch of the label's first official website, which had previously been used to air the original online concert. It was also discovered that iamamiwhoami is managed by the London-based D.E.F. Artist Management, whose roster includes other Swedish artists. Kin was released on 11 June 2012 in CD/DVD and LP/DVD formats through the label's website, with the official release following on 3 September 2012.

Upon release, the album generated very positive review from critics, who praised the album's ambition as a collective as well as its style, incorporating several styles of electronic music and Lee's vocals. iamamiwhoami was nominated for "The Best Tease of the Past 12 Months" category by BBC Radio's 6 Music Blog Awards, with fellow contenders being Lana Del Rey, Elliphant, Battlekat, Savoir Adore and The Sound of Arrows. On 2 March 2012, iamamiwhoami was declared the winner on BBC Radio by Tom Robinson, and the project received their first large airplay debut with "O" after the announcement. This was followed by the release of iamamiwhoami's first airplay promotional single, "Play", on 30 July 2012. iamamiwhoami won the MTV O Music Awards Digital Genius Award, fellow contenders being Amanda Palmer, Gorillaz, OK Go, Radiohead and The Flaming Lips. The project embarked on a European tour for kin in 2012, playing festivals and venues across Europe.

Originally distributed as a series of singles spanning 2010 and 2011, "Bounty" was later consolidated into an album released on 3 June 2013, under iamamiwhoami's label, To whom it may concern. The distribution was handled by Cooperative Music, a consortium of independent labels. The first music video, "B," premiered on 14 March 2010, on iamamiwhoami's YouTube channel, followed by subsequent releases of "O," "U-1," "U-2," "N," "T," and "Y." Each music video was accompanied by the release of digital singles.

Initially, it was presumed that these tracks constituted the entirety of Bounty's playlist. However, in 2011, two additional singles and music videos, "; John" and "Clump," were released. Their association with "Bounty" was only confirmed in June 2012 when iamamiwhoami's YouTube channel organized them into a playlist named "Bounty," alongside the previously mentioned tracks..

On 4 December 2012, iamamiwhoami's label website To whom it may concern. was updated with a note on the front page which stated "20130603 – iamamiwhoami; Bounty", forecasting a physical release of the Bounty series. This was confirmed on the very next day when the Release section of the website displayed Bounty's album cover art, along with its track listing.

iamamiwhoami embarked on a worldwide tour in support of Kin and Bounty in 2012 and 2013, including their first dates in North America.

=== 2014–2017: Blue and Concert in Blue ===
On 17 January 2014, To whom it may concern. and official networks were all updated with artwork that featured Lee in front of a waterfall beneath the title "Fountain". It was confirmed as a new single and released digitally on 22 January 2014. To whom it may concern.'s was also updated with a "Generate" feature, a donation service in which funds were promised to "be used for creative purpose only". After the user donated, they were redirected to a page containing a .GIF image of a fish being released into a pond. Following "Fountain" were three singles "Hunting for Pearls", "Vista" and "Tap Your Glass", which were sporadically released on 25 February, 28 April, and 4 August, respectively.

On 8 July, the third audio visual album was officially announced, titled Blue, released on 10 November in exclusive physical and digital editions.

On 30 April 2015, the second live album/project (CD/DVD/book) was officially announced, titled Concert in Blue, released on 2 September 2015 in exclusive physical and digital editions. As with their previous releases, Concert in Blue was released with a picture book. Concert in Blue included songs from Blue as well as Bounty and Kin. Concert in Blue would also see the release of the first new iamamiwhoami song since 2014 ("The Deadlock"), which was released as a single as well.

On 24 February 2017, Lee announced the release of her new solo single under the alias ionnalee. "Samaritan" was released on 10 March alongside its accompanying music video. Lee also opened several new social media accounts to promote her solo endeavours. When asked about the future of iamamiwhoami, she said that the new project is a continuation of the collective, albeit "the two projects will not exist simultaneously".

=== 2022–present: Be Here Soon ===
On 31 March 2022, Lee announced an audiovisual album from the iamamiwhoami project, Be Here Soon. The first episode from the album, "Don't Wait for Me", was released the same day. It was followed by "Canyon" with Lars Winnerbäck on 7 April, "Zeven" on 14 April and "I Tenacious" on 21 April. The album was released on 3 June 2022.

== Musical style ==
iamamiwhoami is primarily an electronic music project. The music is characterized by Jonna Lee's ethereal vocals and Claes Björklund's intricate production. Their sound blends elements of electropop, synth-pop, art pop, and avant-garde music.

The duo has been compared to artists like Portishead, the Knife, Björk and Fever Ray. Ben Hogwood of musicOMH compared Lee's voice to those of Elizabeth Fraser and Siouxsie Sioux.

=== Influences ===
Jonna Lee stated that she is influenced by Kraftwerk, Cocteau Twins, Depeche Mode, Christopher Nolan, Air and Vangelis. She also added that she enjoys listening to Blood Orange, Arca, Denis Villeneuve, Chromatics, Four Tet, Björk, Todd Terje, Disasterpeace and Mozart.

== Members ==
Music

- Jonna Lee – vocals, instruments, song writing, production
- Claes Björklund – instruments, vocals, song writing, production

Visuals

- Jonna Lee – direction, art direction
- John Strandh – direction, cinematography, photography

Former

- Robin Kempe-Bergman – direction
- Agustín Moreaux – art direction, costume design, direction

Timeline

== Videography ==
Title	Release date		Related releases	
Title	Video streaming^{[A]}	Digital download	Release	Digital download
"Prelude 699130082.451322-5.4.21.3.1.20.9.15.14.1.12"	4 December 2009 31 January 2010^{[B]}	—	—	—
"9.1.13.669321018"	7 January 2010 1 February 2010^{[B]}	—	—	—
"9.20.19.13.5.723378"	25 January 2010 1 February 2010^{[B]}	—	"Like Hell"	16 February 2018
"13.1.14.4.18.1.7.15.18.1.1110"	10 February 2010	—	"Gone"	24 November 2017
"15.6.6.9.3.9.14.1.18.21.13.56155"	22 February 2010	—	—	—
"23.5.12.3.15.13.5–8.15.13.5.3383"	1 March 2010	—	"O"	11 April 2010
"B"	14 March 2010	15 March 2010	Tara Busch remix	19 April 2010
"O"	12 April 2010	11 April 2010	Adrian Lux remix	29 April 2010
"U-1"	3 May 2010	3 May 2010	The Blacksmoke Organisation remix; Khonnor remix	9 July 2010; 16 July 2010
"U-2"	7 May 2010	7 May 2010	The Blacksmoke Organisation remix; Khonnor remix	9 July 2010; 16 July 2010
"N"	2 June 2010	3 June 2010	Eineinmeier remix	25 June 2010
"T"	30 June 2010	30 June 2010	Tele Tele remix	24 September 2010
"Y"	4 August 2010	5 August 2010	Zoo Brazil remix	3 November 2010
"20101001"	1 October 2010^{[C]}	—	"Gone (iamamiwhoami remix)"	14 December 2017
"20101104"	4 November 2010	—	In Concert; "."	4 December 2010
In Concert	16 November 2010^{[D]}	4 December 2010	In Concert; "U-1"; In Concert; "B"; In Concert; "T"; In Concert; "N"; In Concert; "O"; In Concert; "U-2"; In Concert; "Y"; In Concert; "."	4 December 2010
"; John"	15 May 2011	16 May 2011	"+46 702 888 037"^{[E]}	—
"Clump"	31 July 2011	1 August 2011	—	—
"Kin 20120611"	1 February 2012	—	—	—
"Sever"	14 February 2012	15 February 2012	—	—
"Drops"	28 February 2012	29 February 2012	—	—
"Good Worker"	13 March 2012	14 March 2012	—	—
"Play"	27 March 2012	28 March 2012	—	—
"In Due Order"	10 April 2012	11 April 2012	—	—
"Idle Talk"	24 April 2012	25 April 2012	—	—
"Rascal"	8 May 2012	9 May 2012	—	—
"Kill"	22 May 2012	23 May 2012	—	—
"Goods"	5 June 2012	6 June 2012	—	—
Kin	Kin DVD exclusive	11 June 2012	—	—
Bounty	Bounty DVD exclusive	3 June 2013	—	—
"Fountain"	21 January 2014	22 January 2014	—	—
"Hunting for Pearls"	26 February 2014	25 February 2014	—	—
"Vista"	28 April 2014	28 April 2014	—	—
"Tap Your Glass"	4 August 2014	4 August 2014	—	—
"Blue Blue"	5 September 2014	5 September 2014	—	—
"Thin"	2 October 2014	1 October 2014	—	—
"Chasing Kites"	2 October 2014	1 October 2014	—	—
"Ripple"	18 November 2014	10 November 2014	—	—
"The Last Dancer"	4 December 2014	10 November 2014	—	—
"Shadowshow"	22 December 2014	10 November 2014	—	—
Blue	Blue DVD exclusive	15 February 2015	—	—
"Dive"	Blue DVD exclusive	15 February 2015	—	—
Concert in Blue	30 April 2015	2 September 2015	—	—
"Don't Wait for Me"	31 March 2022	31 March 2022	—	—
"Canyon"	7 April 2022	7 April 2022	—	—
"Zeven"	14 April 2022	14 April 2022	—	—
"I Tenacious"	21 April 2022	21 April 2022	—	—
"Changes"	28 April 2022	28 April 2022	—	—
"Flying or Falling"	5 May 2022	5 May 2022	—	—
"A Thousand Years"	12 May 2022	12 May 2022	—	—
"Thunder Lightning"	19 May 2022	19 May 2022	—	—
"Call My Name"	26 May 2022	26 May 2022	—	—
"Walking on Air"	8 July 2022	2 June 2022	—	—
"Still Blue"	19 June 2025	19 June 2025	—	—
A. All YouTube videos, except where noted. B. ^ ^{1 2 3} Re-upload date. The original upload of these videos was removed. C. This video was deleted on 16 November 2010. D. Streamed on To whom it may concern.'s website. E. Phone call stream.

=== Other videos ===
These videos are not musical releases and were deleted on 16 November 2010.

- "20101109"
- "101112"
- "101112-2"
- "101113"
- "101114"
- "101115"
- "http://towhomitmayconcern.cc/"
- "101115-2"

== Discography ==
Studio albums

- Bounty (2010)
- Kin (2012)
- Blue (2014)
- Be Here Soon (2022)
- Still Blue (2025)

Live albums

- In Concert (2010)
- Concert in Blue (2015)
- Konsert (2021)

Compilation albums

- Kronologi (2020)

Remix albums

- Be Here Soon Remixes (2024)

Airplay and promotional singles

- "Play" (2012)
- "Goods" (2012)
- "Y" (2013)
- "Chasing Kites" (2014)
- "Fountain" (2015)
- "Thunder Lightning" (2022)

Remixes

- "After" (iamamiwhoami remix) by Moby (2011)
- "New World" (iamamiwhoami remix) by The Irrepressibles (2013)
- "Gone" (iamamiwhoami remix) by ionnalee (2017)

== Awards and nominations ==
Year	Nominated work	Award	Category	Result
2011	iamamiwhoami	Grammis	Årets innovatör (Innovator of the Year)	Won
2011	iamamiwhoami	MTV O Music Awards	Innovative Artist	Nominated
2011	iamamiwhoami	MTV O Music Awards	Best Web-Born Artist	Nominated
2012	iamamiwhoami	BBC Radio 6 Music	Best Tease of the Past 12 Months	Won
2012	iamamiwhoami	MTV O Music Awards	Digital Genius	Won
2013	Robin Kempe-Bergman: "drops"	Grammis	Årets musikvideo (Music Video of the Year)	Nominated
