= Thomas Hedlund =

Swedish drummer (born 1980)

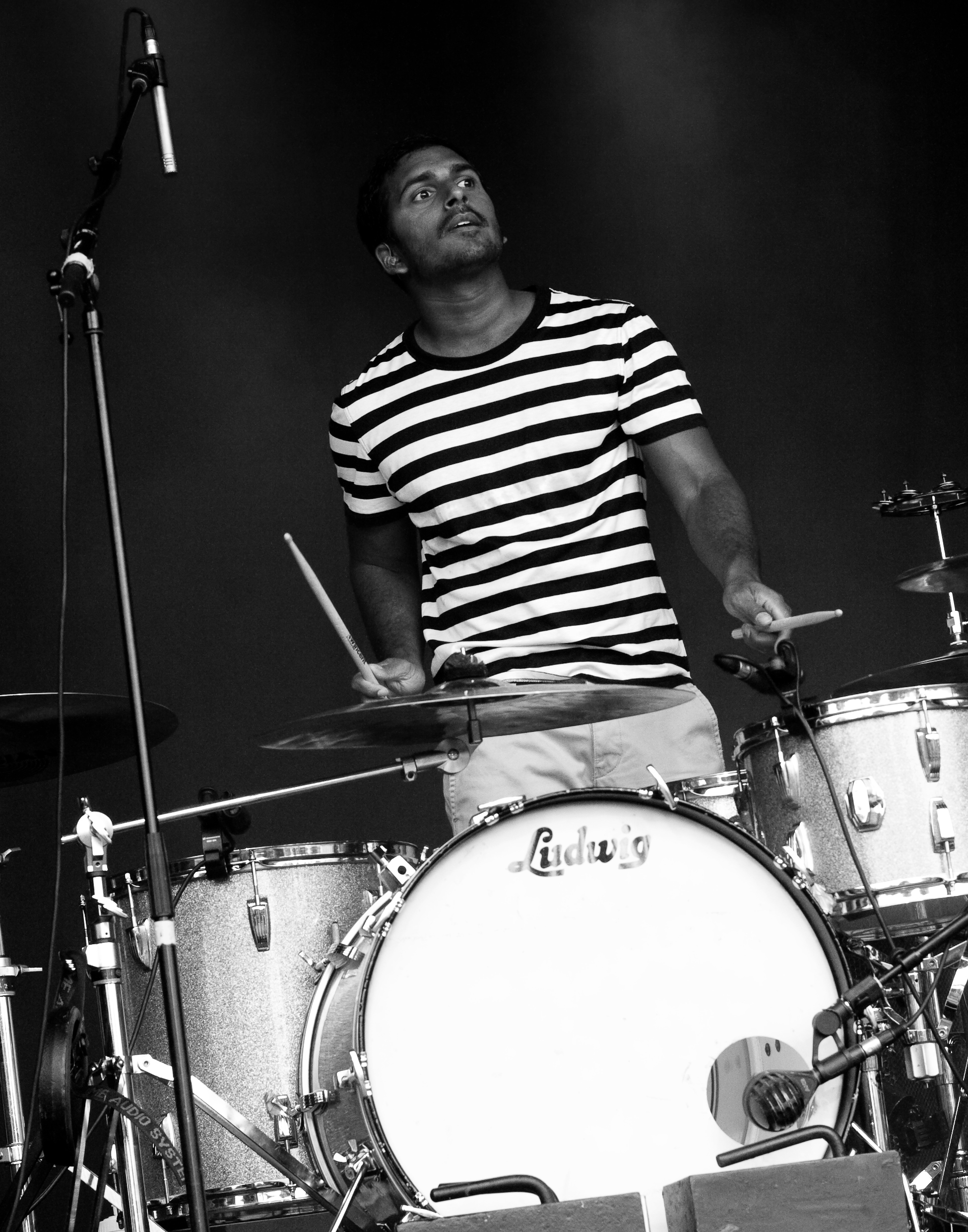
- Hedlund performing with Deportees at Trästockfestivalen 2009

Background information
- Born: Thomas Carl Chaminda Hedlund; 13 May 1980 (age 45); Sri Lanka
- Origin: Umeå, Sweden
- Genres: Indie rock; heavy metal; indie pop; pop rock
- Occupation: Drummer
- Years active: 1998–present
- Member of: Cult of Luna; Deportees; Phoenix (touring/session)
- Formerly of: The Perishers; Khoma

Thomas Carl Chaminda Hedlund (born May 13, 1980) is a Sri Lankan-born Swedish musician, based in Umeå, Västerbotten. Prominently known for being the touring and session drummer for French indie pop group, Phoenix, Hedlund also concurrently serves as the drummer for Swedish post-metal and indie-pop acts, Cult of Luna and Deportees, respectively.

Over the course of his career, Hedlund's dynamic range and modern style, in addition to his technical rhythmic skills have made him an internationally, sought-after drummer professionally, who has collaborated, recorded and performed with many European-based musical acts over the years, including the likes of The Perishers, Khoma, Adam Tensta, Miike Snow, and even Refused side project, Vännas Kasino to name a few.

== History ==
Born in Sri Lanka, Hedlund was raised in Umeå. As a youth, Hedlund played football competitively, before switching his focus to music after picking up the drums and joining the Swedish band, The Perishers.

In the years following his shift to music, Hedlund has become one of Sweden's most versatile drummers, most notably performing, as both a touring and session member, with the Swedish band, Cult of Luna and the French band, Phoenix. Hedlund's dynamic and modern playing style has a characteristic which, despite the aforementioned bands' great musical differences, makes Hedlund's playing recognizable.

Hedlund has been Phoenix's session and live drummer since 2005. He has played the drums on all of the band's albums since It's Never Been Like That. He met Phoenix while opening for them in Scandinavia as a member of Deportees, since the two bands shared a record label.

In addition to his technical skill, he also possesses a great rhythmic imagination, which has made him internationally sought after. Aside from his work with Phoenix and Cult of Luna, Hedlund has also performed live and on studio recordings for the likes of Deportees, The Lost Patrol, Miike Snow, Convoj, Rasmus Kellerman, BOY, CANT, and iamamiwhoami to name a few.

Outside of his musical endeavours, Hedlund also works for a branch of the Swedish Arts Council as a grant committee member, which distributes scholarships and financial assistance to Swedish individuals professionally involved in the fine arts.

== Discography ==
with BOY

- Mutual Friends (2011)

with CANT

- Dreams Come True (2011)

with Convoj

- Exceptionnel (2008)

with Cult of Luna

- The Beyond (2003)
- Salvation (2004)
- Somewhere Along the Highway (2006)
- Eternal Kingdom (2008)
- Vertikal (2013)
- Mariner (with Julie Christmas) (2016)
- A Dawn to Fear (2019)
- The Long Road North (2022)

with Deportees

- All Prayed Up (2004)
- Damaged Goods (2006)
- Under the Pavement – The Beach (2009)
- Islands & Shores (2011)
- The Big Sleep (2015)
- Re-dreaming EP (2019)
- All Future (2019)
- People Are a Foreign Country (2023)

with Khoma

- Tsunami (2004)
- The Second Wave (2006)
- A Final Storm (2010)
- All Erodes (2012)

with iamamiwhoami

- CONCERT IN BLUE (2015)

with The Lost Patrol

- Songs About Running Away (2003)
- Scattered, Smothered & Covered EP (2002)
- Creepy Cool (2001)
- The Lost Patrol (instrumentals) (1999)

with Miike Snow

- Happy to You (2011)

with The Perishers

- From Nothing to One (2002)
- Let There Be Morning (2003)
- Victorious (2007)

with Phoenix

- It's Never Been Like That (2006)
- Wolfgang Amadeus Phoenix (2009)
- Bankrupt! (2013)
- Ti Amo (2017)
- Alpha Zulu (2022)

with Plastic Pride

- No Hot Ashes (1998)

with Simian Ghost

- Simian Ghost (2017)

with Vännas Kasino

- Vännas Kasino (2023)
- 7" (2024)
- II (2024)
