= The Perishers (band) =

Swedish indie rock band

- Origin: Umeå, Sweden
- Genres: Indie rock
- Years active: 1997–2010
- Labels: MNW Music, North Of No South, Nettwerk (management), Nettwerk America
- Members: Ola Klüft; Martin Gustafson; Pehr Åström; Thomas Hedlund

The Perishers were a Swedish indie rock band. The band formed in 1997 with six members. The lineup since 2001, has consisted of Ola Klüft (vocals, guitar), Martin Gustafson (keyboards, backing vocals), Pehr Åström (bass), and Thomas Hedlund (drums).

In 2005, the band was personally handpicked by Sarah McLachlan to open her second leg of the Afterglow tour. Each night of the tour, Sarah McLachlan joined the band and sang background vocals on their song "Pills". The live track was released as a promotional CD single and as an online exclusive EP via Tower Records later that year.

Additionally, several of their songs have been played in episodes of the American television programs The O.C., One Tree Hill, Greek and Veronica Mars. In Veronica Mars, the ballad "Sway" featured prominently in a climactic episode of the series' second season.

Sarah Isaksson (Klüft's former vocal teacher) is a featured artist on their song "Pills". Their song "My Heart" has been played on Saturn Sedan commercials as well as a second-season episode of the ABC Family series Kyle XY. Another song, "Trouble Sleeping", was played in a promotional spot for Grey's Anatomy; the song "Come Out of the Shade" was featured in an episode of the show.

In 2010, the band broke up when the lead vocalist, Ola Klüft, left the group in order to perform under the name A Lanky Swede - he released his first solo album on 14 April 2011.

== Members ==
- Ola Klüft – vocals, guitar
- Martin Gustafson – keyboards, backing vocals
- Pehr Åström – bass
- Thomas Hedlund – drums (also drums for Deportees (band), Phoenix (band) and Cult Of Luna)

== Discography ==
=== Studio albums ===
- From Nothing to One (2002)
- Let There Be Morning (2003)
- Victorious (2007)

=== EPs ===
- Sway EP (2005)
- Pills (Live) EP (2005)

=== Live albums ===
- The Perishers Live (2005)

=== Other ===
- Demo (2000)

=== Cover songs ===
- Blue Christmas
- When Tomorrow Comes

=== Singles ===
- The Night
- My Home Town
- When I Wake Up Tomorrow
- In The Blink Of An Eye
- Sway
- Let There Be Morning
- Pills feat. Sarah McLachlan (Live)
- Trouble Sleeping
- Carefree
- Come Out Of The Shade
- Victorious

=== Non-album tracks ===
- All Wrong
- Blur
- Honestly
- Not Anymore
- Our Days Are Here
- Sleep Tight
- The Best Days
- I Hope You'll Be Missing Me (Like I Will Miss You)

== Songs in other media ==
Year	Title	Type	Song
2004	The O.C.	TV series episode: "The New Kids on the Block"	"Weekends"
2004	The O.C.	TV series episode: "The Way We Were"	"Trouble Sleeping"
2004	One Tree Hill	TV series episode: "Don't Take Me for Granted"	"Pills"
2004	One Tree Hill	TV series episode: "Truth Doesn't Make A Noise"	"My Heart"
2004	One Tree Hill	TV series episode: "You Can't Always Get What You Want"	"Sway"
2005	London	Film	"Nothing Like You and I"
2005	The Sims 2: University	PC Game	"Sway"
2006	Saturn	TV commercial	"My Heart"
2006	Veronica Mars	TV series episode: "Plan B"	"Sway"
2007	Greek	TV series episode: "Separation Anxiety"	"Carefree"
2007	Grey's Anatomy	TV series episode: "Haunt You Everyday"	"Come Out of the Shade"
2007	Grey's Anatomy	TV series episode: "Haunt You Everyday"	"Get Well Soon"
2007	Grey's Anatomy	TV series episode: "Let the Truth Sting"	"Best Friends"
2007	Kyle XY	TV series episode: "Come To Your Senses"	"My Heart"
2007	Kyle XY	TV series episode: "Free To Be Me and You"	"Come Out of the Shade"
2007	Maui Fever	TV series episode: "Forgive and Regret"	"Sway"
2008	90210	TV series episode: "The Jet Set"	"Come out of the Shade"
2008	Eli Stone	TV series episode: "Freedom"	"Victorious"
2008	Greek	TV series episode: "Freshman Daze"	"Nothing Like You and I"
2008	Grey's Anatomy	TV series episode: "Dream A Little Dream of Me"	"Never Bloom Again"
2008	Kyle XY	TV series episode: "Great Expectations"	"Trouble Sleeping"
2008	Kyle XY	TV series episode: "To C.I.R., With Love"	"Let There Be Morning"
2008	One Tree Hill	TV series episode: "You're Gonna Need Someone On Your Side"	"My Own"
2009	Greek	TV series episode: "Dearly Beloved"	"Come Out of the Shade"
2010	16 and Pregnant	TV series episode: "Leah"	"Let There Be Morning""
2010	16 and Pregnant	TV series episode: "Lori"	"Get Well Soon"
2017	Younger	TV series episode: "Irish Goodbye"	"Nothing Like You and I"
