= Mariner (album) =

- Digital download artwork for Mariner (Note: Special editions of Mariner received different colored covers (green, blue, red or yellow) and also had the "shine" at a different angle (horizontal, vertical or diagonal). Green with a vertical "shine", the standard-edition colorway, is shown above.)

Studio album by Cult of Luna & Julie Christmas
- Released: April 8, 2016
- Studios: Studio Hufvudstaden (Söderköping, Sweden); Tonteknik Recording (Umeå, Sweden); Translator Audio & Loho Studios (New York City, U.S.)
- Genres: Post-metal; sludge metal; doom metal
- Length: 54:34
- Label: Indie
- Producers: Kristian Karlsson, Magnus Líndberg, Andrew Schneider

Cult of Luna chronology
Vertikal (2013)	Mariner (2016)	A Dawn to Fear (2019)

Julie Christmas chronology
Coextinction Records 5 (2011)	Mariner (2016)

Mariner is a collaborative studio album between the Swedish post-metal band Cult of Luna and the American vocalist Julie Christmas, formerly of the bands Made Out of Babies and Battle of Mice. Serving as Cult of Luna's seventh studio album and the first time Christmas has appeared on the entirety of a full-length album since her 2010 solo debut The Bad Wife, Mariner was released on April 8, 2016 through Indie Recordings. Contrasting the industrial city themes of Cult of Luna's last studio efforts, Vertikal and Vertikal II from 2013, Mariner focuses its concept on space exploration.

== Background, writing and recording ==
Both Julie Christmas and the members of Cult of Luna had a mutual respect and appreciation for each other's music prior to working together on Mariner. Though Christmas reached out earlier, the two parties began communicating about a collaboration more seriously when Cult of Luna curated the May 2014 festival Beyond the Redshift in London. Cult of Luna wanted Christmas to participate and perform her solo album The Bad Wife. The performance didn't work out but both parties kept in touch after the festival. Guitarist Johannes Persson sent Christmas a demo track the band was working on at the time and asked her to write lyrics and record vocals. Impressed with the result, Cult of Luna asked Christmas if she would be interested in creating a full album. Persson recalled what initially drew him to Christmas in the first place, stating: "I just love Julie's singing. She can go from the softest melodies to the wildest screams, and everything in between. The range of her voice is incredible."

Mariner was written and recorded over the course of about a year. Cult of Luna worked on the instrumental portions in a studio near their hometown of Umeå and digitally sent Christmas demos and tracks. Working with producer Andrew Schneider at his own studio in Coney Island in New York City, she wrote lyrics, recorded vocals and sent them back to Cult of Luna in Sweden. After telling Christmas the thematic and musical direction Cult of Luna was aiming for with Mariner, the band gave her full creative control to write and perform how she best saw fit. Christmas said the experience of working with Cult of Luna was "excellent" and elaborated: "Those guys are great to work with personally, because they have a sense of humor, and they're all super talented but regular, normal people who are just trying to do something that they believe in." Since the album was created largely through online file sharing, Christmas didn't even meet any of the members of Cult of Luna in person until September 2015 when Mariner was roughly halfway completed and the band was doing a small U.S. tour.

Acknowledging that the band's previous album themes went from rural (on 2006's Somewhere Along the Highway) to a fictional story about a mental patient's diary (on 2008's Eternal Kingdom) to urban and industrial (on 2013's Vertikal), Cult of Luna made a conscious effort to focus their attention on themes of space exploration. From Mariner's official announcement:

"At the end of Vertikal, we stood in the cold harshness of the mechanical city and looked up onto the stars. We lost ourselves in the awe of their grace and thought that 'maybe the answer is to be found above.' The ship was leaking and by the look of it, our home was dying. No room for fear when a greater call demands your full attention. So, we left... Onward, forward. Like the old seafarers, we explored the vastness of space. Not bound by physical laws we pass the speed of light and chase the expansion of space until we reach its limit. And then, we continued on and disappeared. This is our story."

The "Star Gate" sequence from 2001: A Space Odyssey served as inspiration for the album's closing track, "Cygnus."

Persson describes Mariner's concept as "a journey into the unknown." That journey comes to a conclusion at the end of the album's final track, "Cygnus," which was heavily inspired by the "Star Gate" sequence from Stanley Kubrick's 1968 film, 2001: A Space Odyssey. Persson elaborated on the theme and story behind the final moments of the album, stating: "What we were trying to put across in those last few minutes was the sound of us penetrating the outer-outer limits of space. [...] It's how we imagine it would be to cross that final limit of the universe. Then we continue on into darkness and disappear."

== Promotion ==
Coinciding with the album's official announcement, Cult of Luna began promoting Mariner in February 2016 with an online stream of the opening track, "A Greater Call". In March 2016, Cult of Luna released "The Wreck of S.S. Needle" for online streaming. Coinciding with the album's first tour announcement in June 2016, the band released a music video for "Chevron" directed by Spanish filmmaker Javier Longobardo, who was requested to "create a journey through unknown worlds with continuous momentum."

At the time of Mariner's release, there were no scheduled tour dates in direct support of the album as a collaborative unit. Cult of Luna has stated that there will not be a full tour, however the band hoped to schedule a few select festival appearances for 2016. Persson commented on the difficulties getting a tour together, stating: "It's hard enough to get six, seven people in their mid- to late-30s with kids and jobs to be able to go and tour in the first place. Add in somebody from another continent and it's an equation that is very difficult to solve." In November 2016, seven months after the album's release, Cult of Luna will embark on a five-date European tour in support of Mariner and perform it in its entirety.

== Reception ==
Professional ratings
Review scores
Source	Rating
Consequence of Sound	C+
Metal Hammer	6/7 stars
Metal Injection	10/10
MetalSucks	4/5 stars
Rock Hard	8.5/10

Upon release, Mariner was met with critical acclaim from music critics.

Rolling Stone named Mariner the 9th best metal album of 2016. Terrorizer listed the album at No. 8 on its year-end list.

In 2019, MetalSucks compiled a list of the best metal albums between 2010-2019, polling 180 musicians, managers, publicists, label representatives and writers, where Mariner was ranked the 25th best album of the decade.

== Track listing ==
No.	Title	Length
1.	"A Greater Call"	8:19
2.	"Chevron"	8:53
3.	"The Wreck of S.S. Needle"	9:33
4.	"Approaching Transition"	12:59
5.	"Cygnus"	14:50
Total length:		54:34

=== Vinyl bonus track ===
No.	Title	Length
6.	"Beyond the Redshift"	11:43
Total length:		66:17

== Personnel ==
Mariner personnel adapted from CD liner notes.

=== Band ===
- Julie Christmas – vocals
- Thomas Hedlund – drum kit
- Andreas Johansson – bass guitar
- Kristian Karlsson – keyboards
- Fredrik Kihlberg – guitar, vocals
- Magnus Líndberg – percussion
- Johannes Persson – guitar, vocals

=== Production ===
- Magnus Líndberg – drums and bass recording at Tonteknik Recording, mixing and mastering at Redmount Studios
- Kristian Karlsson – additional recording at Studio Hufvudstaden
- Andrew Schneider – recording and engineering of Julie Christmas' vocals at Translator Audio and Loho Studios

=== Artwork ===
- Erik Olofsson – design

== Charts ==
Chart (2016)	Peak position
Belgian Albums (Ultratop Flanders)	193
Finnish Albums (Suomen virallinen lista)	29
Swedish Albums (Sverigetopplistan)	28
Swiss Albums (Schweizer Hitparade)	76
