= Mariam Wallentin =

Swedish musician and voice actress (born 1982)

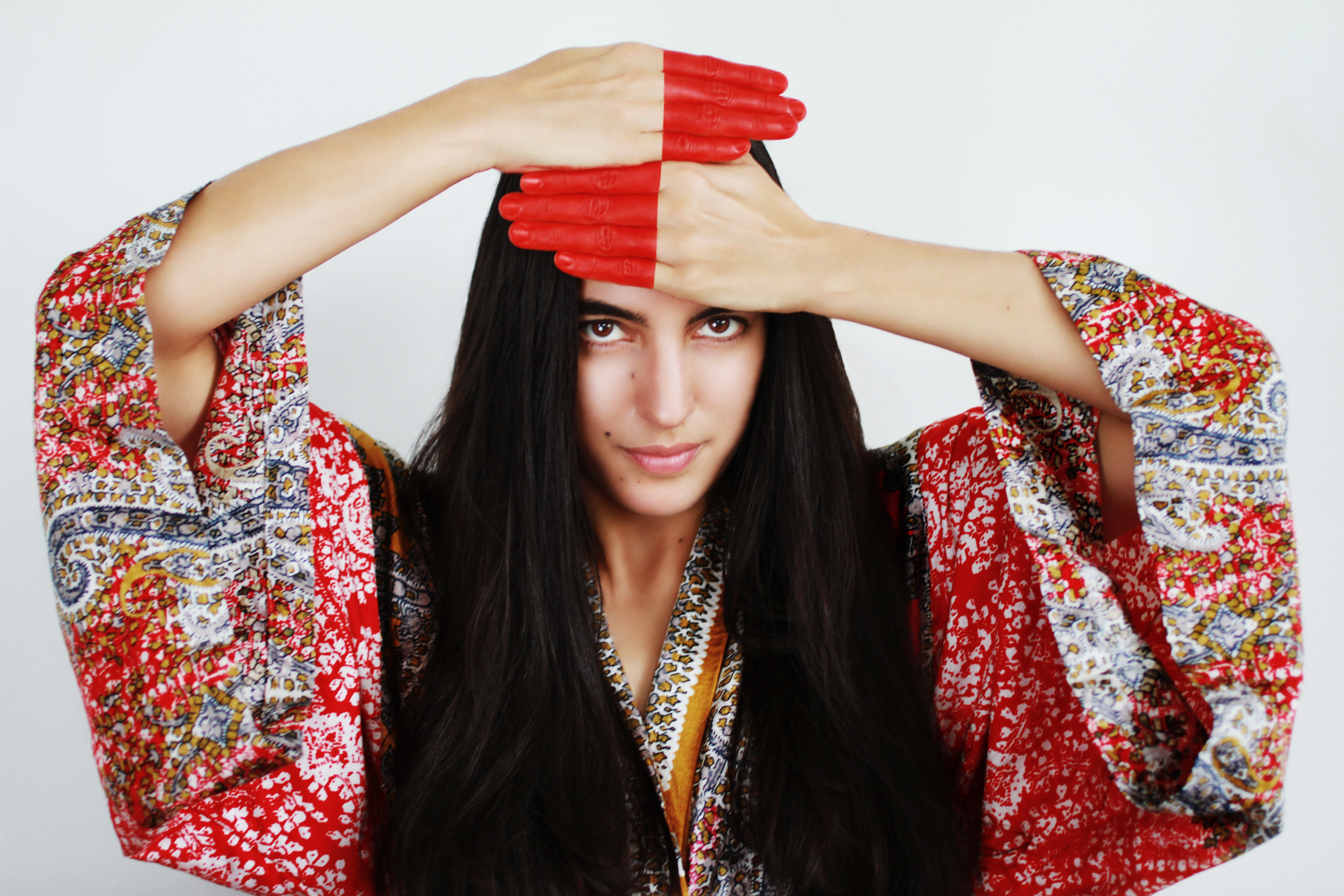
Mariam Wallentin (2014)

Mariam Karolina Riahi Wallentin (born 28 July 1982 in Örebro, Sweden) is a Swedish musician (vocals, percussion, composer) and voice actress.

== Biography ==
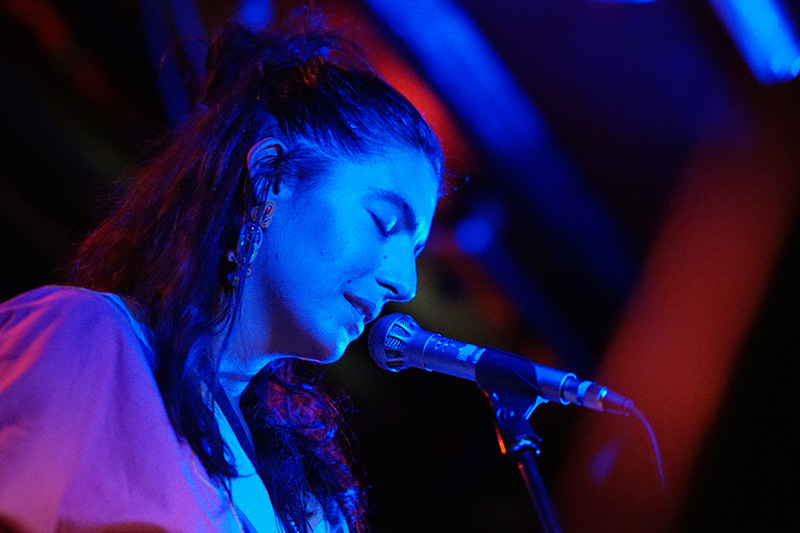
Mariam Wallentin at Aarhus Festival 2018

Wallentin first sang in the local soul band Carnival, with which she released an EP in 1999. From 2006 she studied at the Högskolan för scen och musik (Academy of Music and Drama) in Gothenburg. There she met her husband, Andreas Werliin, with whom she formed the duo Wildbirds & Peacedrums. The band has released several albums since 2007 and toured internationally. In 2008 she was named Swedish Jazzact of the Year. Since 2013 she is also on tour with the experimental solo project Mariam the Believer, which released their first album Blood Donation, in the same year. She is also active as a singer with the Fire!Orchestra. She is also a musician on Gothenburg String Theory, David Åhlen, Susanna & The Magical Orchestra, Lykke Li and with Lisa Ullén and Nina de Heney as Nuiversum. She sings the title song (co-written by Ben Frost) for the 2020 Sir Ridley Scott-produced sci-fi series Raised by Wolves. In 2022, she appears as a guest vocalist on The Long Road North album by fellow Swedish post-metal band Cult of Luna.

== Honors ==
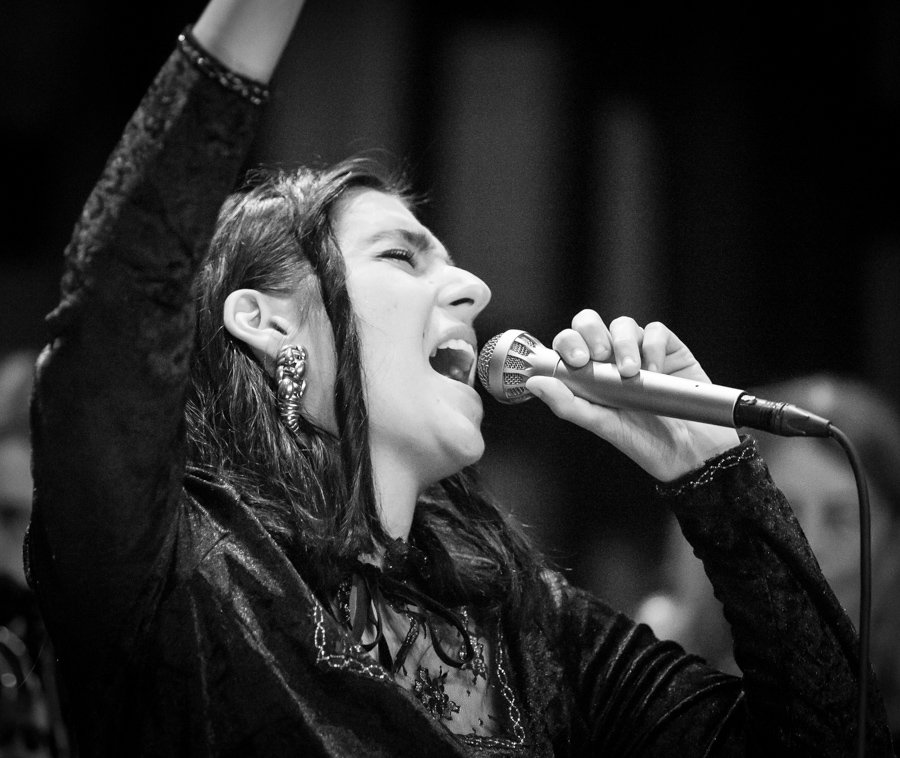
Mariam Wallentin (with Fire! at the Oslo Jazz Festival 2016)

- 2013: Wallentin was honored with the Jazzkatten as Musician of the Year.
- 2013: Recipient of a scholarship from the Sten A. Olsson Cultural Foundation.

== Discography ==
- Wildbirds & Peacedrums: Heartcore (2007)
- Wildbirds & Peacedrums: The Snake (2008)
- Fire!: You Liked Me Five Minutes ago (2009)
- Wildbirds & Peacedrums: Rivers (2010)
- Anders Jormin: Ad Lucem (2012)
- Fire Orchestra: Exit! (2013)
- Mariam the Believer: Blood Donation (2013)
- Fire Orchestra: Enter (2014)
- Mariam the Believer: The Wind (EP, 2014)
- Wildbirds & Peacedrums: Rhythm (2014)
- Fire Orchestra: Ritual (2016)
- Mariam the Believer: Love Everything (2017)
- Mariam the Believer: String Variations (2019)
- Zeitkratzer & Mariam Wallentin: "Shape of Jazz To Come" (2020)

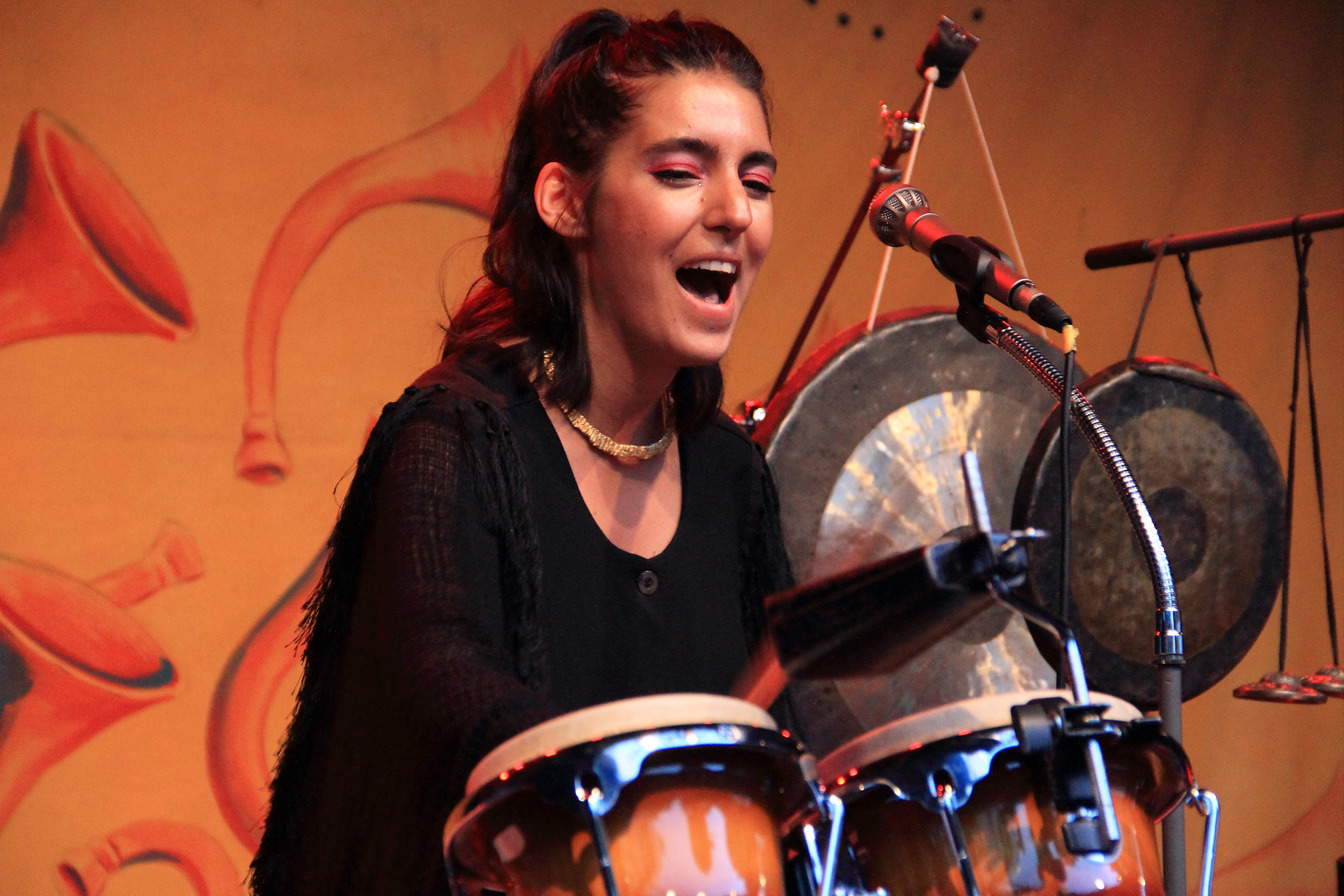
Wallentin (with Wildbirds & Peacedrums at the Rudolstadt-Festival 2016)

== Filmography ==
- Den otroliga vandringen 2 – På rymmen i San Francisco – Hope
- Doug – Patti
- Lilla Djungelboken – Kung Louie
- Quack Pack – Fnatte
- Janne Långben – The Movie – Roxanne
- Lejonkungen – Unga Nala
- Det flygande barnet (2015)
