= Fire Was Born =

Video by Cult of Luna
- Released: 23 March 2009
- Recorded: Scala, London, 1 July 2008
- Genre: Post-metal
- Length: 116:24
- Label: Earache

Cult of Luna chronology
Eternal Kingdom (2008)	Fire Was Born (2009)	Eviga riket (2010)

Fire Was Born is the first video album by Swedish post-metal band Cult of Luna. It was released on March 23, 2009. It features an entire live performance, the three music videos, and an interview with guitarist/vocalist Johannes Persson and keyboardist Anders Teglund, in which they answer fan-submitted questions.

== Track list ==
All songs written and performed by Cult of Luna. Recorded 1 July 2008 at Scala, London.

1. "Following Betulas"
2. "Owlwood"
3. "Ghost Trail"
4. "Leave Me Here"
5. "Österbotten"
6. "Finland"
7. "Adrift"
8. "Eternal Kingdom"
9. "Echoes"
10. "Dark City, Dead Man"

=== Music videos ===
1. "The Watchtower"
2. "Leave Me Here"
3. "Back to Chapel Town"

== Personnel ==
- Klas Rydberg – vocals
- Johannes Persson – guitars, vocals
- Erik Olòfsson – guitars
- Fredrik Kihlberg –guitar, vocals
- Andreas Johansson – bass guitar
- Anders Teglund – keyboards, samples
- Thomas Hedlund – drums
- Magnus Líndberg – drums, percussion
