= Vertikal =

2013 studio album by Cult of Luna

Studio album by Cult of Luna
- Released: January 25, 2013
- Recorded: Tonteknik Recording
- Genres: Post-metal; sludge metal; progressive metal
- Length: 65:40
- Label: Indie
- Producer: Cult of Luna

Cult of Luna chronology
Eternal Kingdom (2008)	Vertikal (2013)	Vertikal II (2013)

Vertikal is the sixth studio album by Swedish post-metal band Cult of Luna and is also the band's first studio album since Eternal Kingdom (2008). The album was released in Europe on January 25, 2013, through Indie Recordings, and in the US on January 29, 2013, on CD through Density Records and on vinyl through Back on Black. To promote the album, Cult of Luna released the song "I: The Weapon" for online streaming prior to the release of Vertikal, and released a music video for the song "Passing Through" in February 2013. The album was critically acclaimed upon release and earned an average score of 85 based on 10 reviews at Metacritic, which assigns a normalized rating out of 100 to reviews from critics.

During the writing process, Cult of Luna was heavily influenced by Fritz Lang's 1927 film Metropolis, which became a major source of inspiration for Vertikal's conceptual theme, sound and imagery. Thematically, the album features ideas of cities, machinery, and factories, and it was also noted for incorporating a heavier focus on keyboards and electronic elements than on previous Cult of Luna albums. The writing sessions were particularly fruitful, leaving the band with a large collection of songs to choose from for the album. As a result, the band released the companion EP, Vertikal II, in September 2013.

== Writing and recording ==
The 2013 release of Vertikal marks the longest period of time between studio albums in Cult of Luna's history; the band last released Eternal Kingdom five years prior in 2008. The band cited the fact that all members were living in different cities, had busy lives with their own families and jobs, and not being signed to record label at the time as various reasons for this long gap. Ultimately and retrospectively, Cult of Luna guitarist Johannes Persson said this additional time was beneficial for the writing process. He said, "we didn't rush into anything, and we wrote a whole lot of different songs of which not all of them made it into the recording process. We could actually choose songs that would be working toward the goal we had."

When the members of Cult of Luna decided they officially wanted to start working on a new album, they began messaging each other ideas of what they wanted it to sound like using books, films and photographs for inspiration. Cult of Luna first noted that their two previous albums, Somewhere Along the Highway and Eternal Kingdom, had very rural conceptual theme to them, so the band made the conscious effort to aim for a city theme with Vertikal. Common themes that arose out of the exchange of media for inspiration included Futurism and German Expressionism of the 1920s, in addition to compiling a list of ideas for how including: industrial, factory, monotone, repetitive, harsh and grey. One idea that prominently popped up during these discussions was Fritz Lang's 1927 film Metropolis — a landmark film in German Expressionism. Cult of Luna drummer and percussionist Thomas Hedlund commented on the band's interest in the film, stating: "We wanted to find a contrast to the previous albums. They were more rural, earthy and organic in a way. This time we wanted to explore the city; the machinery that is a society. Metropolis dealt with questions about belonging, the need for a change, human vs. machines, love. All of which were topics that we found inspiring in the making of this album." Speaking on the importance of having a conceptual theme for an album, Persson said, "I think one important aspect of artistic work is having boundaries and limits. I think many people do themselves a disservice by working too freely, as then you don't challenge yourself – anything can go."

Cult of Luna did not begin composing music until this concept was solidified. Persson said that having this clear direction in place made the writing process easier and noticed there were fewer arguments between the band members. The band has stated that Vertikal's sonic themes include "machinery, repetition and clear, linear structures." Cult of Luna also wanted to achieve a more "static" sound on the album. To do this, the band recorded with more downpicking on the guitars, the drums parts had the cymbals recorded separately, and the band recorded the sounds of, "hitting metal rods and ladders and stairways [and] cutting them up like beats." For the first time in Cult of Luna's career, keyboards and electronics became an integral part of the writing process, whereas before they were just an afterthought.

For a time, Cult of Luna considered releasing Vertikal as a double album with the amount of material they had written, but instead released three additional songs that were written during these sessions (but not yet recorded) as Vertikal II later in 2013.

== Promotion ==
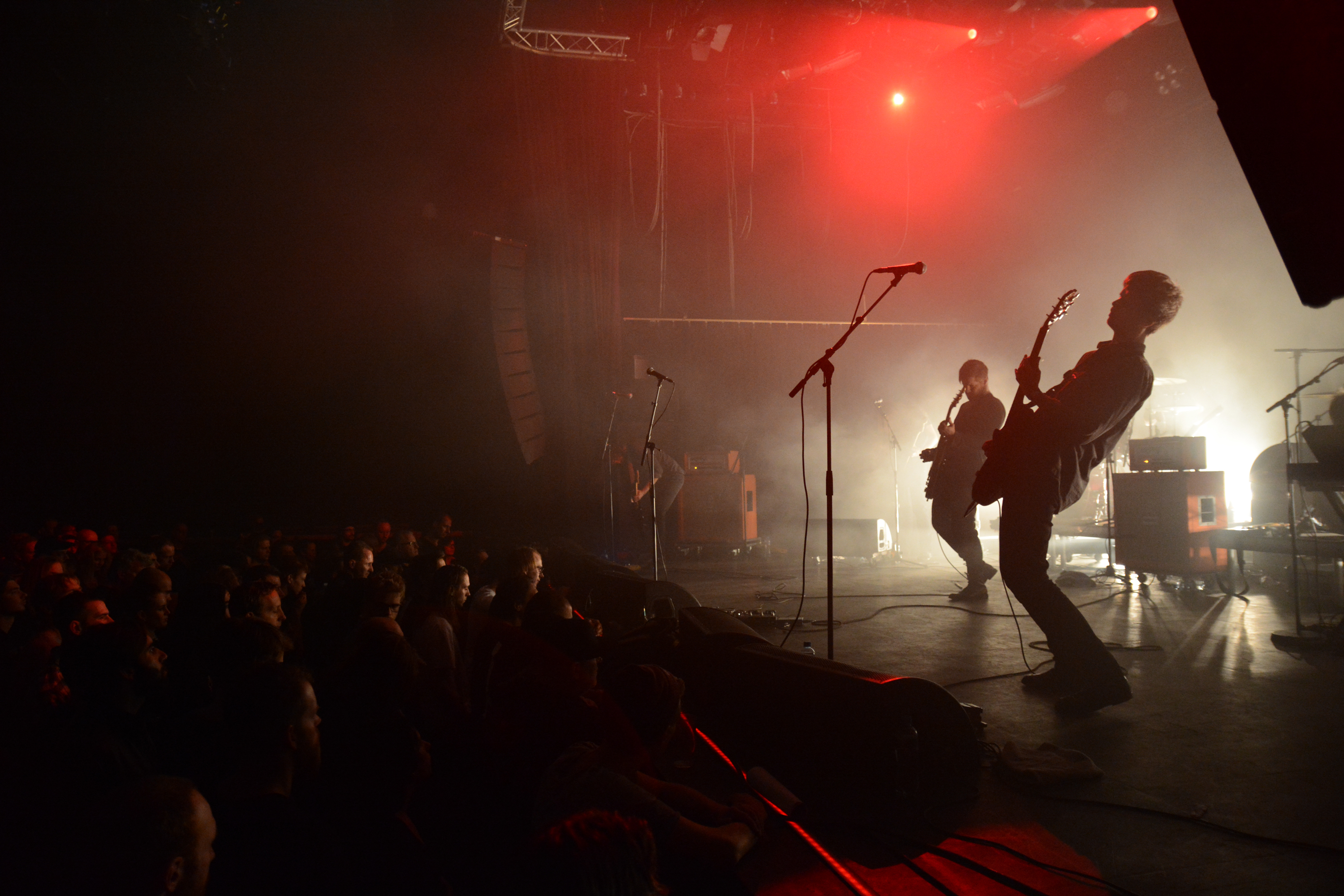
Cult of Luna performing live in the Netherlands on November 1, 2013.

In December 2012, Cult of Luna made the song "I: The Weapon" available for online streaming to help promote the album. After the release of Vertikal in February 2013, the band released a music video for the song "Passing Through". The video was directed by Markus Lundqvist and filmed in a hospital in Sweden that closed in the 1960s, "where the mentally ill were routinely castrated and lobotomized." Cult of Luna also recorded an acoustic version of "Passing Through" for the website Off The Record. The acoustic version was recorded live and outside during a snowstorm in Finland. Johannes Persson said of this recording, "Halfway through the first take, my fingers went numb. It was freezing cold and that was actually the wind and snow that you hear in the video; there were no sound effects. The snow fell so hard that the bell instrument was almost muted and you could barely hear it."

In support of Vertikal, Cult of Luna embarked on a January–May 2013 European tour. In September/October 2013, Cult of Luna toured North America, co-headlined with Katatonia and featuring the openers Intronaut and Tesseract. This tour marked the first time the band had toured in the United States since 2005 — at which point the band was touring in support of their third studio album, Salvation. A member of the band Kongh acted as a live, fill-in bassist on this tour. Persson commented on this tour, stating, "Well, we weren't sure what to expect in the US because Monday was our first show in the US in eight years. The audience was really great. The last time we played in the US the audience was about twenty people. This time, it was a lot more than twenty people."

== Reception ==
Professional ratings
Aggregate scores
Source	Rating
Metacritic	85/100
Review scores
Source	Rating
AllMusic	4.5/5 stars
Classic Rock	4.5/5 stars
Decibel	8/10
Exclaim!	8/10
Kerrang!	5/5 stars
Pitchfork	6.8/10
PopMatters	9/10
Revolver	4/5 stars
Slant Magazine	3.5/5 stars
Sputnikmusic	4/5

The album was generally well received critically. At Metacritic, which assigns a normalized rating out of 100 to reviews from critics, the album received an average score of 85, which indicates "universal acclaim", based on 10 reviews.

Writing for AllMusic, Gregory Heaney gave the album 4.5 out of 5 stars and said that, "While Cult of Luna have always been an impressive band, the solid construction and merciless execution of Vertikal makes for an incredible listening experience. Dean Brown of PopMatters gave the album a 9/10 and said that, "The fact that after six full-length LPs Cult of Luna can still deliver an opus as challenging, engrossing and intricately layered as Vertikal is a testament to the abilities of this Swedish collective; a band who have now earned their place as one of the most essential in progressive metal." However, Grayson Currin of Pitchfork gave the album an average to low review of 6.8 out of 10 citing issues with sequencing and transitions between songs, and the length of some songs and the album as a whole. He said, "Vertikal is an interesting and accomplished hybrid, but it isn't perfect. In fact, it works best on a track-by track basis, though the record clearly aims to be its own holistic, all-encompassing universe."

The concept and themes of Vertikal related to the film Metropolis were generally well received. Brown said that, "Cult of Luna have been laborious in their attempt to ensure that the music of Vertikal is reminiscent of the austere atmosphere of the expressionist film that forms its muse, and the Swedish septet have more than succeeded in doing so. Vertikal is chillingly futuristic and its quasi-industrial stance is almost Teutonic sounding; much like the aural equivalent of its stark artwork." Jordan Mainzer of Slant Magazine gave the album a three-and-a-half out of five stars and said, "on a conceptual level, the dubstep beat transposes Metropolis's theme, man versus machine, in a contemporary setting. If Lang's film portrayed man operating in clocklike motion, battling, succumbing to the machine, Vertikal suggests that man has conquered it by taking control and using it to explore and communicate his emotions." Raziq Rauf of the BBC gave the album a positive review and said, "With a concept loosely based upon Fritz Lang's dystopian science fiction film, Metropolis, it sounds as stark and uncomfortable as you might expect."

Many music critics gave attention to Vertikal's almost-19-minute track, "Vicarious Redemption." Heaney wrote, "Confident in their craft, the bandmembers are careful never to rush things, allowing the songs on Vertikal to play out the way they're supposed to, as is the case with the 18-and-a-half-minute epic 'Vicarious Redemption,' which seems to grow exponentially as it slowly plods toward its conclusion." Brown called the song an "intimidating centerpiece," but also that it, "may be the pinnacle of Cult of Luna's artistic output; a piece which covers plenty of ground through well-paced ascending and descending passages which directly maintain a strict sense of cohesion that renders running times redundant." However, Currin stated that, "The distended build that opens the 19-minute 'Vicarious Redemption' demands an edit that it doesn't get; as is, some of the heaviest and best moments on the record, when the septet works in perfectly combustible unity, get diluted by the deep slog that surrounds them."

== Track listing ==
No.	Title	Length
1.	"The One"	2:06
2.	"I: The Weapon"	9:23
3.	"Vicarious Redemption"	18:50
4.	"The Sweep"	2:40
5.	"Synchronicity"	7:13
6.	"Mute Departure"	9:06
7.	"Disharmonia"	0:45
8.	"In Awe Of"	9:56
9.	"Passing Through"	5:41
Total length:		65:40

Limited-edition bonus track

No.	Title	Length
10.	"The Flow Reversed"	6:46
Total length:		72:26

== Personnel ==
Band members

- Thomas Hedlund – drums and percussion
- Andreas Johansson – bass
- Fredrik Kihlberg – guitar and vocals
- Magnus Lindberg – drums and engineering
- Erik Olofsson – guitar and graphic design
- Johannes Persson – guitar and vocals
- Anders Teglund – keyboards

Additional personnel

- Kristian Karlsson – additional recording
- Måns Lundberg – additional recording

== Vertikal II ==
Vertikal II

EP by Cult of Luna
- Released: September 17, 2013
- Genres: Post-metal; sludge metal; progressive metal
- Length: 35:19
- Label: Indie
- Producers: Cult of Luna, Kristian Karlsson

Cult of Luna chronology
Vertikal (2013)	Vertikal II (2013)	Mariner (2016)

Vertikal II is an EP by Swedish post-metal band Cult of Luna that was released on September 17, 2013, through Density Records/Indie Recordings. The EP features three previously unreleased tracks that were written during the original Vertikal sessions, but not recorded. The CD and digital versions of the EP also feature a remix of "Vicarious Redemption" (originally on Vertikal) by Justin Broadrick of Jesu and Godflesh fame.

Vertikal II is seen as a continuation and completion of the band's "journey into the harshness of the monotone city landscape" that began with its early-2013 studio album, Vertikal. Cult of Luna guitarist Johannes Persson said, "With Vertikal II, we complete and end a chapter that, for the last few years, have been a big part of our lives. Now we leave the inner city and look up into the vast void above." At one point in the writing process, Cult of Luna considered releasing Vertikal as a double album, but scrapped the idea because, as Persson puts it, "double albums are hard, as it's hard to maintain a consistent quality." The band's idea then was to release a few additional tracks shortly after the release of the studio album as a continuation – a plan that was kept secret from both their fans and record label until the EP's masters were almost completed.

The remix of "Vicarious Redemption" by Justin Broadrick was not originally a part of the EP. Cult of Luna's record label pressured them to include a remix on the release. The band caved into the label's demands and asked them to get Broadrick to remix "Vicarious Redemption" out of spite because, at almost 19-minutes long, it was the most difficult song to work with. Persson, who said he believes remixes to be a "waste of time," said Broadrick was chosen because he is "one of the few people I'd trust with a remix," and later praised his work on this song as an "amazing way of doing a remix."

=== Track listing ===
1. "O R O" – 7:20
2. "Light Chaser" – 6:23
3. "Shun the Mask" – 11:58
4. "Vicarious Redemption" (remix by Justin Broadrick) – 9:38

=== Personnel ===
- Cult of Luna – composer, producer
- Kristian Karlsson – engineer, producer
- Magnus Lindberg – engineer, mastering, mixing
- Erik Olofsson – design
