= Somewhere Along the Highway =

Studio album by Cult of Luna
- Released: April 24, 2006
- Recorded: Late 2005
- Genres: Post-metal; post-rock; sludge metal
- Length: 64:41
- Labels: Earache Records (MOSH 344CD)
- Producer: Cult of Luna

Cult of Luna chronology
Salvation (2004)	Somewhere Along the Highway (2006)	Eternal Kingdom (2008)

Digipack cover
- The cover to the limited edition digipack edition of the album, of which 8000 were printed.

Somewhere Along the Highway is the fourth studio album by Swedish post-metal band Cult of Luna, released in 2006 by Earache Records. A concept album, it revolves around the motif of male loneliness. It was warmly received by critics and accordingly claimed several awards.

The album followed Salvation in the band's chronology, and differed from it in terms of sound and feel. While Salvation was deemed "celestial", Somewhere Along the Highway was characterized as "unpolished" by the band.

In 2025, Graham Hartmann of Metal Injection included the album in his list of "10 Extremely Underrated Metal Albums From The 2000s".

== Recording and release ==
To achieve the sound, the album's initial tracking took place over seven days in an octagonal wooden barn surrounded by what the band described as "Blair Witch" scenery close to the band's hometown of Umeå in northern Sweden. According to drummer Magnus Lindberg, the remote location, coupled with the sighting of "Wicca witch women dancing in the woods" and the actual acoustics of the barn itself all contributed towards creating the perfect ambience to lay down the basic tracks which were done primarily live, as a unit. Accordingly, the album has "a less polished sound – not as produced as Salvation – definitively a more rough sound." The band had a relatively low budget and little time to record the album in comparison with the painstakingly produced Salvation; a press release advised listeners to "expect a raw and unpolished album".

The album was released on April 24, 2006, by Earache Records. Also printed were 8000 copies of a limited edition digipack with an alternate sleeve, as well as a two-disc vinyl edition, of which only 1000 were made. The band recorded and made available covers of Smashing Pumpkins' "Bodies", as well as Unbroken's "Recluse" during the album's promotion and subsequent tour of Europe and the UK. They were also limited edition; 1500 copies were shipped to indie stores across the UK, which were subsequently given away for free. A further 500 copies were sold during April and May's European tour.

In August 2006, the band released a remix of "Marching to the Heartbeats", entitled "Heartbeats", solely on the Internet community MySpace. The song was available for download for a few days and was later removed. According to Anders Teglund (keyboards and electronics), the intention was to see if the song would be "kept alive" by file sharing, as well as serving as a statement against the conservative nature of the music industry.

A video was shot for "Back to Chapel Town", directed by band member Johannes Persson. Shooting lasted five days, and the concept, according to Persson, is that of "a man waking up in a world he doesn't know, he knows nothing of his past or where he is, people treat him like air or are very suspicious of him".

== Theme ==
Cult of Luna albums tend to focus on a theme; guitarist Erik Olofsson states in an interview that this release focuses on "Male loneliness – I was very inspired by a book by J. M. Coetzee [Life & Times of Michael K] about a man in South Africa with a hare lip. [The character] escapes from everything and lives off the earth eating only pumpkins. Johannes [Persson] had similar ideas for the lyrics about loneliness, it all has a kind of countryside vibe to it."

== Reception ==
Professional ratings
Review scores
Source	Rating
About.com	4/5 stars
AllMusic	3.5/5 stars
Collector's Guide to Heavy Metal	9/10
Decibel	(positive)
Exclaim!	(favourable)
Metal Storm	8.4/10
Rock Hard	8/10
Terrorizer	6/10

Writing for Decibel, Andrew Bonazelli posited that the album "finally exceeded the American post-metal standard", after "early efforts Cult of Luna and The Beyond mirrored the aggro facet of the Neur-Isis template, and 2004's Salvation practically suffocated on its own infatuation with sustained tension, Highway makes its points straight away, evoking a rich gamut of bad moods, then marching purposefully toward the gray at the end of the tunnel." He praises it as "far and away their most original and gripping effort", and complements the timing of the release being before that of contemporaries Isis' In the Absence of Truth, citing it as a reason that "nobody's going to call copycat". For AllMusic, Rick Anderson draws distinctions between Cult of Luna and Swedish compatriots Meshuggah and Amon Amarth, proffering that "the overriding concern seems to be more with building a carefully constructed soundscape rather than just venting spleen". His review is not quite as glowing as Bonazelli's, determining that "if the pattern gets a bit predictable and tiresome by the album-ending instrumental [sic] 'Dark City Dead Man', it's still a powerful and compelling one".

It placed fifth in Decibel's top albums of 2006, as well as it being awarded the best rock/metal album of the year at the P3 Gold awards in Gothenburg, Sweden. The only region in which it charted was Sweden, where it peaked at number 59 on May 4, 2006.

== Track listing ==
All tracks are written by Cult of Luna with lyrics by Johannes Persson.

No.	Title	Length
1.	"Marching to the Heartbeats"	3:13
2.	"Finland"	10:46
3.	"Back to Chapel Town"	7:09
4.	"And with Her Came the Birds"	5:58
5.	"Thirtyfour"	10:00
6.	"Dim"	11:46
7.	"Dark City, Dead Man"	15:49

== Personnel ==
Band members

- Thomas Hedlund – drums and percussion
- Andreas Johansson – bass
- Fredrik Kihlberg – guitar and vocals
- Magnus Lindberg – drums, recording and mixing
- Erik Olofsson – guitar
- Johannes Persson – guitar and vocals
- Klas Rydberg – vocals
- Anders Teglund – keyboards and electronics

Other personnel

- Martin Gustafson – backing vocals on "Marching to the Heartbeats"
- Pelle Henricsson – mastering
- David Sundqvist – intro loop on "Dim" and programmed drums on "Dark City, Dead Man"
