= Khoma =

Swedish band

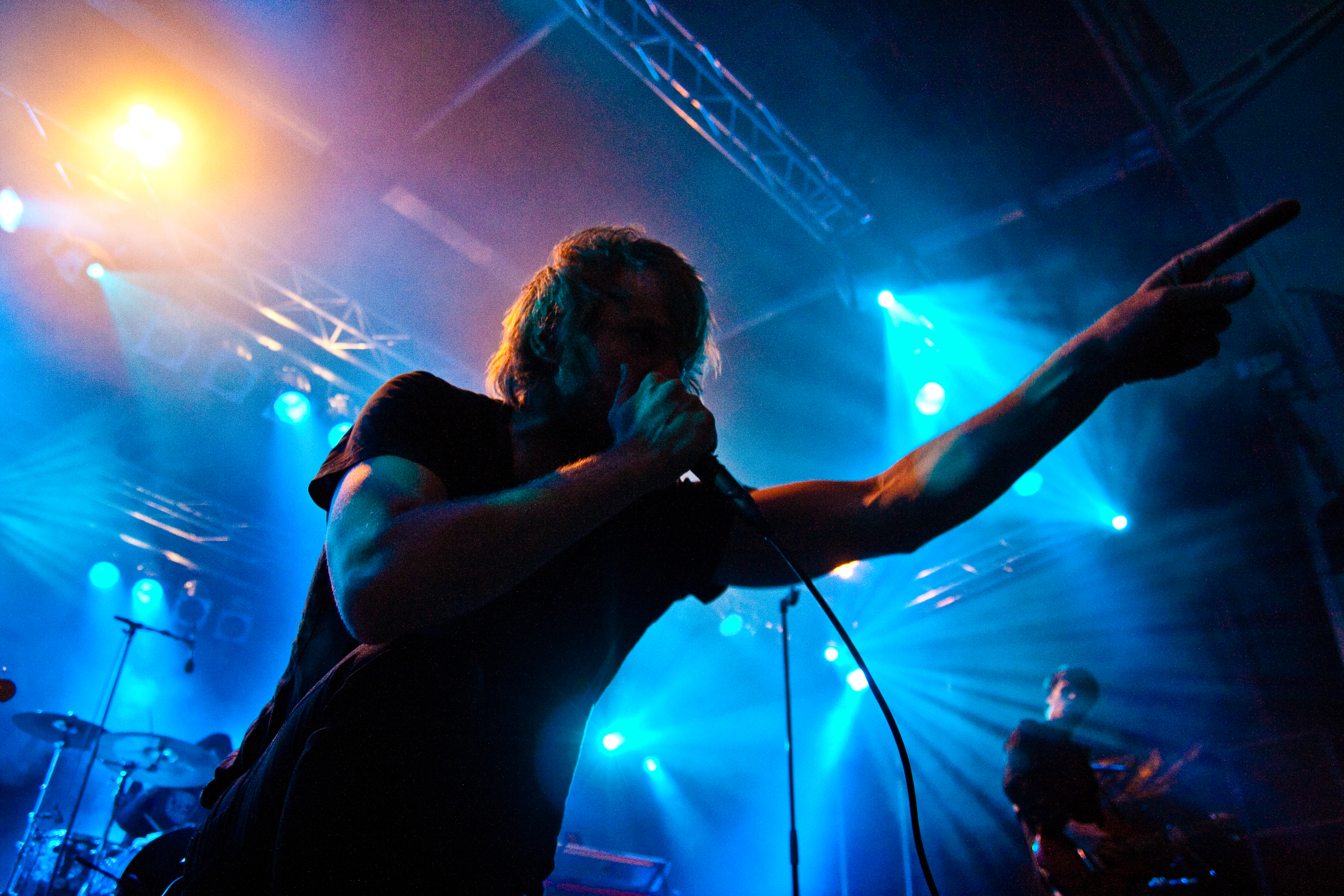

Background information
- Origin: Umeå, Sweden
- Genres: Progressive metal; alternative metal
- Years active: 2002–present
- Label: Roadrunner
- Members: Jan Jämte; Johannes Persson; Fredrik Kihlberg
- Website: www.khoma.se

Khoma is a progressive and alternative metal musical group from Sweden (Umeå). Founded by Jan Jämte (vocals), Johannes Persson (guitar) and Fredrik Kihlberg (vocals, piano) in 2002, it shares some of its members with bands like Cult of Luna, The Perishers and The Deportees.

In 2004 the band released their limited edition debut album, "Tsunami". Two years later, they signed with Roadrunner Records and released their sophomore album,"The Second Wave".

The band appeared to have gone into hiatus beginning with 2007, only to return in 2010 with a third album, "A Final Storm", released by Swedish label Selective Notes. The record was awarded the "Best Rock/Metal 2010" prize by Sveriges Radio and was also nominated for a Swedish Grammis award. A song from this album, ”The Guillotine”, appeared on the soundtrack of David Fincher's The Girl with the Dragon Tattoo (2011), which was being filmed in Sweden at the time.

Their most recent album, "All Erodes" was released in 2012 by Berlin-based label Pelagic Records.

== Discography ==
- Tsunami (2004)
- The Second Wave (2006)
- A Final Storm (2010)
- All Erodes (2012)
