= In the Shadow of Your Shadow =

2026 album by Cult of Luna

Studio album by Cult of Luna
- Released: 6 November 2026
- Length: 71:24
- Label: Red Crk

Cult of Luna chronology
The Long Road North (2022)	In the Shadow of Your Shadow (2026)

In the Shadow of Your Shadow is the tenth studio album by Swedish post-metal band Cult of Luna. The album was released on 6 November 2026 through Red Crk Recordings.

== Promotion ==
To promote the album, on 11 June 2026, Cult of Luna released the song "In The Shadow of Your Shadow" prior to the release of In The Shadow of Your Shadow, with a music video by Dehn Sora.

On 19 August 2026, the song "A Way Back" was released as a single.

== Track listing ==
All tracks are written by Cult of Luna, except where noted:

In the Shadow of Your Shadow track listing
No.	Title	Length
1.	"In the Shadow of Your Shadow"	7:34
2.	"Sadness Will Reign" (featuring Joe Duplantier)	4:47
3.	"Landby"	2:43
4.	"Breach"	12:15
5.	"The Rift"	7:54
6.	"A Way Back"	5:57
7.	"One More Day" (featuring David Eugene Edwards)	11:48
8.	"From Grey to Black"	6:36
9.	"Burial"	11:50
Total length:		71:24

== Personnel ==
Band members

- Thomas Hedlund – drums and percussion
- Andreas Johansson – bass guitar
- Fredrik Kihlberg – guitar and vocals
- Magnus Lindberg – guitar, drums and engineering
- Johannes Persson – guitar and vocals
- Kristian Karlsson – keyboards, vocals and engineering

Additional personnel

- Joe Duplantier (Gojira) – featured on "Sadness Will Reign"
- David Eugene Edwards (Wovenhand) – featured on "One More Day"
- Daniel Berglund – co-producer

== Charts ==
Chart performance for In the Shadow of Your Shadow
Chart (2026)	Peak position
Belgian Albums (Ultratop Flanders)	116
Belgian Albums (Ultratop Wallonia)	83
Finnish Physical Albums (Suomen virallinen lista)	10
French Physical Albums (SNEP)	68
French Rock & Metal Albums (SNEP)	21
Swiss Albums (Schweizer Hitparade)	74
UK Indie Album Breakers (Official Charts)	11
UK Rock & Metal Albums (Official Charts)	27
