= Let There Be Morning =

Studio album by The Perishers
- Released: 2003 (re-released 2005/2006)
- Length: 40:40
- Label: Nettwerk

The Perishers chronology
From Nothing to One (2002)	Let There Be Morning (2003)	The Perishers Live (2005)

Professional ratings
Aggregate scores
Source	Rating
Metacritic	65/100 link
Review scores
Source	Rating
Allmusic	link

Let There Be Morning is an album by The Perishers, released in 2003. The album was re-released in North America in 2005 under Nettwerk/Nettwerk America Records and in 2006 under the Red Ink label in the United Kingdom. Track four, entitled "My Heart," has been used in commercials for the 2007 Saturn Aura.

== Track listing ==
=== 2003 Release ===
1. "Weekends" – 4:56
2. "Sway" – 4:21
3. "A Reminder" – 3:56
4. "My Heart" – 3:30
5. "Nothing Like You and I" – 3:34
6. "Trouble Sleeping" – 4:51
7. "Still Here" – 3:47
8. "Going Out" – 3:40
9. "Pills" – 3:13
10. "Let There Be Morning" – 4:52

=== 2005/2006 Release ===
1. "Weekends" – 4:55
2. "Sway" – 4:20
3. "A Reminder" – 3:48
4. "My Heart" – 3:26
5. "Nothing Like You and I" – 3:33
6. "Trouble Sleeping" – 4:42
7. "Still Here" – 3:46
8. "Going Out" – 3:37
9. "Pills" – 3:09
10. "Let There Be Morning" – 4:45
11. "Trouble Sleeping" (Acoustic version, iTunes only) – 3:17

=== 2005 Release (Taiwanese CD/DVD Edition) ===
1. "Weekends" – 4:56
2. "Sway" – 4:21
3. "A Reminder" – 3:56
4. "My Heart" – 3:30
5. "Nothing Like You and I" – 3:34
6. "Trouble Sleeping" – 4:51
7. "Still Here" – 3:47
8. "Going Out" – 3:40
9. "Pills" – 3:13
10. "Let There Be Morning" – 4:52

Bonus Tracks

1. "All Wrong"
2. "Honestly"
3. "Trouble Sleeping (Fresh Version)"
4. "Blur"
5. "Blue Christmas"

DVD

1. Audio/Visual band documentary shot in Umea, Sweden
2. "Sway" [music video]
3. "Let There Be Morning" [music video]
