= A Dawn to Fear =

Studio album by Cult of Luna
- Released: September 20, 2019
- Recorded: 2018–2019
- Studio: Ocean Sound Recordings, Second Home Studio and Sandås Silence
- Genre: Progressive metal; sludge metal; post-metal
- Length: 79:06
- Label: Metal Blade
- Producer: Cult of Luna

Cult of Luna chronology
Mariner (2016)	A Dawn to Fear (2019)	The Long Road North (2022)

A Dawn to Fear is the eighth studio album by Swedish post-metal band Cult of Luna. The album was released on September 20, 2019 through Metal Blade Records. Due to its length, most physical editions are released in two CDs.

== Promotion ==
To promote the album, Cult of Luna released the song "The Silent Man" prior to the release of A Dawn to Fear. In support of A Dawn to Fear, Cult of Luna embarked on a 2020 tour through North America, with openers Emma Ruth Rundle and Intronaut.

== Reception ==
The album was generally well received critically. At Exclaim!, Mark Tremblay wrote an unrated review for this album saying, "A Dawn to Fear rewards its patient listeners with that they want, bringing enough familiarity but offering enough new ideas sonically that there's no risk of falling into pure nostalgia — and satisfying longtime fans of the band at the same time."

Professional ratings
Review scores
Source	Rating
Metal Storm	9.3/10
MetalSucks	4/5 stars
Exclaim!	7/10
Sputnikmusic	5/5 stars

== Track listing ==
No.	Title	Length
1.	"The Silent Man"	10:36
2.	"Lay Your Head to Rest"	6:24
3.	"A Dawn to Fear"	8:51
4.	"Nightwalkers"	10:48
5.	"Lights on the Hill"	15:08
6.	"We Feel the End"	7:06
7.	"Inland Rain"	7:00
8.	"The Fall"	13:13
Total length:		79:06

Most CD editions are released in two discs, each containing four tracks.

== Personnel ==
Band members

- Thomas Hedlund – drums and percussion
- Andreas Johansson – bass
- Fredrik Kihlberg – guitar and vocals
- Magnus Lindberg – guitar, drums and engineering
- Johannes Persson – guitar and vocals
- Kristian Karlsson – keyboards, vocals and engineering

Additional personnel

- Erik Olofsson – artwork and graphic design
- Henrik Oja – additional engineering
- Daniel Berglund – additional engineering
- Hugo Sundkvist – design and photography
- Alexis Sevenier – photography

== Charts ==
Chart (2016)	Peak position
Belgian Albums (Ultratop Flanders)	177
Belgian Albums (Ultratop Wallonia)	186
German Albums (Offizielle Top 100)	11
Scottish Albums (OCC)	61
Swiss Albums (Schweizer Hitparade)	40
UK Album Downloads (OCC)	62
UK Independent Albums (OCC)	25
UK Rock & Metal Albums (OCC)	7
