= Deportees (band) =

Swedish rock band

- Origin: Vindeln and Umeå, Sweden
- Years active: 2003–present
- Members: Peder Stenberg; Anders Stenberg; Thomas Hedlund
- Past members: Mattias Lidström

Deportees is a Grammis-nominated Swedish band from Vindeln and Umeå, formed in 2003, consisting of brothers Peder Stenberg (vocals) and Anders Stenberg (guitar), in addition to Thomas Hedlund (drums). Previously, Mattias Lidström was a member as well, playing keyboards. To date, the band has released six studio albums and one EP.

== History ==
Deportees' debut single, "Arrest Me 'til It Hurts", contained pop, funk, and country influences. The song generated considerable interest among the public and critics and was followed by the band's first full-length album, All Prayed Up, in 2004.

Deportees promoted the release by touring Sweden, the United States, the UK, and Ireland. In 2006, for their second album, Damaged Goods, they cooperated with producers Pelle Gunnerfeldt and Björn Yttling. Their third album, Under the Pavement – The Beach, released in 2009, was produced by Måns Lundberg.

The band's fourth album, Islands & Shores came out in 2011. In 2015, The Big Sleep was released. Mattias Lidström subsequently quit the band.

In March 2019, a new single, "Bright Eyes" was published. It was followed by the EP Re-Dreaming in May. Deportees' fifth album, titled All Future, was released in October 2019.

== Discography ==
=== Albums ===
- All Prayed Up (2004)
- Damaged Goods (2006)
- Under the Pavement – The Beach (2009)
- Islands & Shores (2011)
- The Big Sleep (2015)
- All Future (2019)
- People Are a Foreign Country (2023)

=== EPs ===
- Re-Dreaming (2019)
