= From Nothing to One =

Studio album by The Perishers
- Released: 2002
- Genre: Alternative Rock
- Label: Nettwerk

The Perishers chronology
From Nothing to One (2002)	Let There Be Morning (2003)

From Nothing to One, released in 2002, is the debut album by Swedish indie rock band The Perishers.

== Track listing ==
1. "When I Wake Up Tomorrow" – 3:12
2. "In the Blink of an Eye" – 4:05
3. "Someday" – 3:52
4. "When I Fall" – 3:09
5. "The Night – 4:42
6. "Steady Red Light" – 3:35
7. "My Home Town" – 4:12
8. "Let's Write Something Down" – 4:01
9. "On My Way Home" – 3:59
10. "All Over Now" – 3:30
11. "What We Once Had" – 5:28
