= The Long Road North =

Studio album by Cult of Luna
- Released: 11 February 2022
- Recorded: 2021
- Studios: Second Home Studio and Sandås Silence
- Genres: Sludge metal; progressive metal; post-metal
- Length: 69:00
- Label: Metal Blade
- Producer: Cult of Luna

Cult of Luna chronology
A Dawn to Fear (2019)	The Long Road North (2022)	In the Shadow of Your Shadow (2026)

The Long Road North is the ninth studio album by Swedish post-metal band Cult of Luna. The album was released on 11 February 2022 through Metal Blade Records. It peaked at No. 14 on the German albums chart.

== Promotion ==
To promote the album, on 1 December 2021, Cult of Luna released the song "Cold Burn" prior to the release of The Long Road North, with a music video created using Unreal Engine, in collaboration with North Kingdom and Arctic Game Lab. The band also released the song "Into the Night" on 13 January 2022. In support of The Long Road North, Cult of Luna have embarked on a 2022 tour through Europe in February and March, and will continue the tour in October. One of the concerts in the tour included their 'Beyond The Redshift' festival on 12 March 2022, co-headlined with bands such as Alcest, Brutus, and Svalbard.

== Reception ==
The album was generally well received critically, earning two positive reviews in Louder Sound. At Metal Injection, Ben G. labeled The Long Road North "a superb album that is more mature, nuanced and consistent than their 2019 masterpiece, A Dawn to Fear, but also maybe a bit less transcendental." Ellis Heasley of Distorted Sound explained in a review, "Even by their supremely lofty standards, The Long Road North is yet another triumph for the band. Nearly 70 minutes feels like no time at all, with the album working best when given your undivided attention. Once it’s over, you'll no doubt be quick to take this 'long road' all over again."

=== Accolades ===
Publication	List	Rank
Metal Hammer	The Best Metal Albums Of 2022 So Far	–

== Track listing ==
All tracks written by Cult of Luna, except where noted:

The Long Road North track listing
No.	Title	Length
1.	"Cold Burn"	9:41
2.	"The Silver Arc"	7:37
3.	"Beyond I"	3:07
4.	"An Offering to the Wild"	12:43
5.	"Into the Night"	6:58
6.	"Full Moon"	3:06
7.	"The Long Road North"	10:02
8.	"Blood Upon Stone"	11:39
9.	"Beyond II" (co-written by Colin Stetson)	4:07
Total length:		69:00

Japanese edition bonus disc: The Raging River (Disc 2)
No.	Title	Length
1.	"Three Bridges"	8:45
2.	"What I Leave Behind"	5:57
3.	"Inside of a Dream" (featuring Mark Lanegan)	3:20
4.	"I Remember"	8:08
5.	"Wave After Wave"	12:22
Total length:		38:41

== Personnel ==
Band members

- Thomas Hedlund – drums and percussion
- Andreas Johansson – bass guitar
- Fredrik Kihlberg – guitar and vocals
- Magnus Lindberg – guitar, drums and engineering
- Johannes Persson – guitar and vocals
- Kristian Karlsson – keyboards, vocals and engineering

Additional personnel

- Mariam Wallentin – vocals on 'Beyond (I)'
- Christian Mazzalai (Phoenix) – guitar on 'Blood Upon Stone'
- Laurent Brancowitz (Phoenix) – guitar on 'Blood Upon Stone'
- Colin Stetson – bass saxophones, tubax, flutes and lyricon on 'Beyond (II)' and 'An Offering to the Wild'
- Erik Olofsson – artwork and graphic design
- Henrik Oja – additional engineering
- Daniel Berglund – additional engineering
- Ted Jensen – mastering

== Charts ==
Chart performance for The Long Road North
Chart (2022)	Peak position
Belgian Albums (Ultratop Flanders)	93
Belgian Albums (Ultratop Wallonia)	186
Finnish Albums (Suomen virallinen lista)	16
German Albums (Offizielle Top 100)	14
Scottish Albums (Official Charts)	52
UK Independent Albums (Official Charts)	17
UK Rock & Metal Albums (Official Charts)	5
