= Victorious (Perishers album) =

Studio album by The Perishers
- Released: September 4, 2007
- Genre: Indie rock
- Length: 43:09
- Label: Nettwerk
- Producer: Per Sunding

The Perishers chronology
The Perishers Live (2005)	Victorious (2007)

Professional ratings
Review scores
Source	Rating
AllMusic	4/5 stars
Music Emissions	4/5 stars
PopMatters	4/5 stars

Victorious is the last album released by The Perishers. It was released on 4 September 2007.

== Track listing ==
All songs were written by Ola Klüft and The Perishers.

1. "Midnight Skies" – 4:35
2. "Never Bloom Again" – 2:19
3. "Carefree" – 3:14
4. "My Own" – 2:44
5. "Victorious" – 3:11
6. "Come Out of the Shade" – 3:59
7. "Best Friends" – 4:42
8. "Almost Pretty" – 4:26
9. "Is It Over Now?" – 2:36
10. "To Start a New" – 3:44
11. "8AM Departure" – 4:36
12. "Get Well Soon" – 3:15
13. "Sleep Tight"" – 2:32 U.S. iTunes only bonus track
