= Islands & Shores =

Studio album by Deportees
- Released: 19 October 2011
- Genre: Pop, rock
- Length: 44:00
- Label: Deportees AB, Universal Music
- Producer: Måns Lundberg

Deportees chronology
Under the Pavement – The Beach (2009)	Islands & Shores (2011)	The Big Sleep (2015)

Singles from Islands & Shores
- 1. "Islands & Shores" Released: 24 August 2011; 2. "A Heart Like Yours in a Time Like This" Released: 25 January 2012; 3. "The Doctor in Me" Released: 14 March 2012

Islands & Shores is the fourth studio album by Swedish band Deportees, released on 19 October 2011 through Deportees AB and Universal Music.

== Track listing ==
1. "Islands & Shores" – 5:39
2. "The Doctor in Me" – 4:14
3. "A Heart Like Yours in a Time Like This" – 6:18
4. "Medicate It Right" – 4:29
5. "Warpaint" – 3:48
6. "Carry No Blow" – 4:18
7. "A New Name to Go By" (featuring Lykke Li) – 4:04
8. "The Wild in Me" – 4:00
9. "When Buildings Sleep" – 3:12
10. "Future Shocks" – 4:09

== Charts ==
Chart (2006)	Peak position
Swedish Albums Chart	3
