= Cult of Luna (album) =

Studio album by Cult of Luna
- Released: 14 September 2001
- Recorded: 2001
- Genres: Post-metal; doom metal; sludge metal
- Length: 60:25
- Labels: Rage of Achilles; Earache Records (MOSH 271CD)
- Producer: Cult of Luna

Cult of Luna chronology
Cult of Luna/Switchblade (2000)	Cult of Luna (2001)	The Beyond (2003)

Professional ratings
Review scores
Source	Rating
Drowned In Sound	9/10 stars

Cult of Luna is the debut studio album by Swedish post-metal band Cult of Luna, released in 2001. It was originally released by Rage of Achilles, and later by Earache Records after the band signed a record contract.

== Track listing ==
All tracks written by Cult of Luna.

No.	Title	Length
1.	"The Revelation Embodied"	7:45
2.	"Hollow"	9:59
3.	"Dark Side of the Sun"	3:13
4.	"Sleep"	14:01
5.	"To Be Remembered"	5:56
6.	"Beyond Fate"	8:44
7.	"101"	1:42
8.	"The Sacrifice"	9:05

== Personnel ==
Band members

- Marco Hildèn – drums and percussion
- Magnus Lindberg – samples, guitar and engineering
- Erik Olofsson – guitar
- Johannes Persson – guitar and vocals
- Klas Rydberg – vocals
- Axel Stattin – bass

Other personnel

- Mats Hammarström – engineering, mixing and piano
- Pelle Henricsson – mastering
- Jan Jämte – additional vocals
- Jonathan Leijonhufvud – album art and design
- Lovisa Nyström – cello
- Jonas Rosén – additional vocals
