= The Beyond (album) =

Studio album by Cult of Luna
- Released: February 10, 2003
- Recorded: 2002
- Studios: Tonteknik Recording, Umea, Sweden
- Genres: Post-metal; doom metal; sludge metal
- Length: 74:47
- Labels: Earache Records (MOSH 263CD)
- Producers: Cult of Luna; Magnus Lindberg

Cult of Luna chronology
Cult of Luna (2001)	The Beyond (2003)	Salvation (2004)

Professional ratings
Review scores
Source	Rating
Allmusic	3/5 stars
Collector's Guide to Heavy Metal	9/10
Drowned in Sound	9/10
Exclaim!	lukewarm
Metal Injection	8.5/10
Ox-Fanzine	9/10
Rock Hard	8.5/10
Sputnikmusic	4/5 stars

The Beyond is the second studio album by Swedish post-metal band Cult of Luna, released in 2003.

== Track listing ==
All tracks written by Cult of Luna.

No.	Title	Length
1.	"Inside Fort Meade"	0:44
2.	"Receiver"	8:08
3.	"Genesis"	11:36
4.	"The Watchtower"	6:20
5.	"Circle"	8:10
6.	"Arrival"	9:32
7.	"Leash"	7:48
8.	"Clones"	2:20
9.	"Deliverance"	8:47
10.	"Further"	11:22

== Personnel ==
=== Band members ===
- Marco Hildèn – drums and percussion
- Andreas Johansson – bass
- Magnus Lindberg – percussion, guitar, recording, mixing and production
- Erik Olofsson – guitar
- Johannes Persson – guitar and vocals
- Klas Rydberg – vocals

=== Additional personnel ===
- Per Gustafsson – artwork and graphic design
- Johanna Hedlund – cello
- Thomas Hedlund – additional percussion
- Pelle Henricsson – production, mastering and mixing
- Ola Klüft – additional vocals
- Anders Pettersson – pedal steel guitar
- Jonas Rosen – additional vocals
