= Eternal Kingdom =

Studio album by Cult of Luna
- Released: (Europe) June 16, 2008 (United States) July 8, 2008
- Recorded: Tonteknik Studios in Umeå, February—April 2008
- Genres: Post-metal; sludge metal
- Length: 60:54
- Labels: Earache Records (MOSH359CDL)
- Producer: Cult of Luna

Cult of Luna chronology
Somewhere Along the Highway (2006)	Eternal Kingdom (2008)	Vertikal (2013)

Eternal Kingdom is the fifth studio album by Swedish post-metal band Cult of Luna. It was released in 2008 on Earache Records like the band's previous three albums. The album was recorded at Tonteknik Studios in Umeå where the band originates from between February and April 2008.

On June 26 it debuted at #47 on the Swedish album chart, and in 2009 the band were nominated for a Grammisgalan in the category Best Rock Band.

The album is accompanied by a bilingual hardback book and audiobook, Eviga riket, which features new soundscapes and pieces of music written and performed by the band. It was released on February 23, 2010 and was the last record featuring lead singer and founding member Klas Rydberg.

== Sound ==
The album is said to be heavier than the band's previous efforts and has a much darker tone.

The band's guitarist, Erik Olofsson, has said the following about the new album: "It is with great ambition and struggle we have created a very heavy album. The sound is strong and progressive. Our compositions do not hold back on anything this time!"

== Theme ==
The album has no known concept or theme. The band initially told journalists that the album had a concept based on a diary they'd found in their practice space, but guitarist Johannes Persson revealed in 2012 that the alleged concept was a hoax, designed to expose music journalists' lazy questioning.

The devised story was as follows: Cult of Luna rehearsed in an area that was once the site of a long demolished mental institution. Upon moving their practice space to a different spot on the same site, the band uncovered long forgotten relics of the hospital, including old apparatus and medical journals. Amongst the discovery was the diary of Holger Nilsson, a former inmate of the prison placed there after drowning his wife. The diary was titled 'Tales from the Eternal Kingdom'.

Digesting the diary, the band realised that they had stumbled upon the ramblings of a madman. In the diary, Nilsson blamed the death of his wife on the Näcken, a Swedish folk entity that was known for drowning locals in rivers by singing them into a trance in Swedish mythology. The diary created a completely imagined world in which owl men and tree men all contributed to a fantasy story that explained why Nilsson was innocent of the crime.

The fake concept was accepted by journalists until the launch of the Eviga riket book, when literary critics picked up on the fallacies of the story. Ahead of the book's release, Erik Jonsson of Västerbottens-Kuriren theorized that the persona of Holger Nilsson must be part or entirely fiction. The name is a play on Nils Holgersson, and other aspects of the fictional story are based on jokes within the band's personal lives.

== Reception ==
Professional ratings
Review scores
Source	Rating
Allmusic	4/5 stars
Collector's Guide to Heavy Metal	9/10
Decibel	8/10
The List	4/5 stars
Ox-Fanzine	4/5 stars
PopMatters	8/10
Rock Hard	9/10
Rock Sound	9/10

== Track listing ==
All lyrics are written by Klas Rydberg & Johannes Persson; all music is composed by Cult of Luna.

No.	Title	Length
1.	"Owlwood"	7:39
2.	"Eternal Kingdom"	6:41
3.	"Ghost Trail"	11:50
4.	"The Lure (Interlude)"	2:33
5.	"Mire Deep"	5:10
6.	"The Great Migration"	6:32
7.	"Österbotten"	2:19
8.	"Curse"	6:30
9.	"Ugín"	2:44
10.	"Following Betulas"	8:56

== Fire Was Born ==
Eternal Kingdom was re-released with their first full-length live DVD Fire Was Born on April 27, 2009. The video entered the Swedish DVD charts in third position, while the re-released album entered at number 51 on the music charts.

== Personnel ==
Band members

- Thomas Hedlund – drums and percussion
- Andreas Johansson – bass
- Fredrik Kihlberg – guitar and vocals
- Magnus Lindberg – drums and recording
- Erik Olofsson – guitar and graphic design
- Johannes Persson – guitar and vocals
- Klas Rydberg – vocals
- Anders Teglund – keyboards, electronics and mixing on "Österbotten"

Additional personnel

- Samuel Lindberg – recording of horns
- Pär Olofsson – additional illustration
- Erik Palmsberg – horns on "The Lure (Interlude)" and "Following Betulas"
- David Sandström – vocals on "Following Betulas"
