= Salvation (Cult of Luna album) =

Studio album by Cult of Luna
- Released: (European Union) October 4, 2004 (United States) October 19, 2004
- Recorded: April − July 2004
- Genres: Post-metal; post-rock; progressive rock; sludge metal
- Length: 73:45
- Labels: Earache Records (MOSH 283CDL)
- Producer: Cult of Luna

Cult of Luna chronology
The Beyond (2003)	Salvation (2004)	Somewhere Along the Highway (2006)

Professional ratings
Review scores
Source	Rating
Allmusic	4.5/5 stars
Collector's Guide to Heavy Metal	8/10
Rock Hard	9.0/10
Sputnikmusic	5/5 stars
Terrorizer	4.5/5 stars

Salvation is the third studio album by Swedish post-metal band Cult of Luna, released on Earache Records in 2004; on October 4 in Europe, and October 10 in the United States.

A music video was recorded for "Leave Me Here", directed by Anders Forsman and Linus Johansson. It premiered on April 30, 2005, on MTV2 and Fuse TV.

== Track listing ==
All tracks written by Cult of Luna.

No.	Title	Length
1.	"Echoes"	12:30
2.	"Vague Illusions"	10:14
3.	"Leave Me Here"	7:15
4.	"Waiting for You"	10:47
5.	"Adrift"	7:19
6.	"White Cell"	5:40
7.	"Crossing Over"	8:32
8.	"Into the Beyond"	11:26

== Personnel ==
Cult of Luna

- Thomas Hedlund – drums and percussion
- Andreas Johansson – bass
- Magnus Lindberg – percussion, mixing and production
- Erik Olofsson – guitar and graphic design
- Johannes Persson – guitar and vocals
- Klas Rydberg – vocals
- Anders Teglund – keyboards

Other personnel

- Per Gustafsson – graphic design
- Pelle Henricsson – mastering
- Anna Ledin – photography
