= Cult of Luna =

Swedish post-metal band

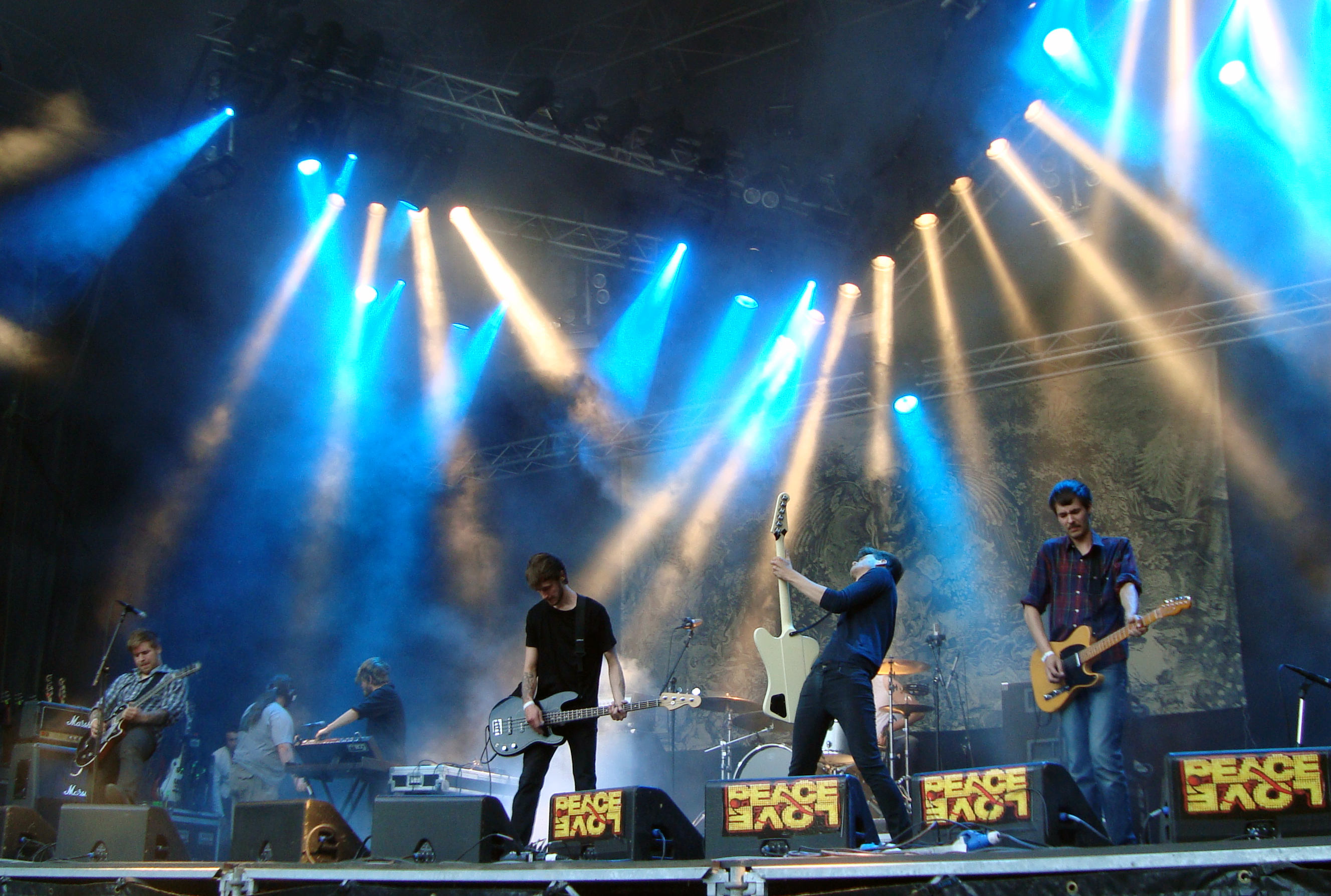
- Cult of Luna at Peace & Love in Borlänge, Sweden in 2009

Background information
- Also known as: LUNA inc. (1998–1999)
- Origin: Umeå, Sweden
- Genres: Post-metal; sludge metal
- Years active: 1998–present
- Labels: Earache; Indie; Metal Blade; Red Creek
- Members: Magnus Líndberg; Johannes Persson; Andreas Johansson; Thomas Hedlund; Fredrik Kihlberg; Kristian Karlsson
- Past members: Klas Rydberg; Erik Olòfsson; Fredrik Renström; Marco Hildén; Axel Stattin; Anders Teglund
- Website: cultofluna.com

Cult of Luna is a Swedish post-metal band from Umeå founded in 1998. Their style of music is similar to contemporary bands Neurosis and Isis. Cult of Luna was signed to Earache Records in the early 2000s and released five albums, including the commercially successful albums Salvation (2004) and Somewhere Along the Highway (2006). After an extended period of inactivity, Cult of Luna returned with its Indie Recordings debut Vertikal (2013) and companion EP Vertikal II (2013), both drawing inspiration from Fritz Lang's 1927 film, Metropolis. In 2016 the band released their space-themed collaborative album, Mariner, featuring American vocalist Julie Christmas.

== History ==
=== Formation and early releases (1998–2007) ===
Cult of Luna formed from the remnants of a Umeå hardcore punk band Eclipse in 1998, under original name "LUNA inc." They slowly garnered critical appreciation and underground popularity with early releases Cult of Luna (2001) and The Beyond (2003); however, it is 2004's Salvation that can be considered their 'breakthrough' release. This was followed by Somewhere Along the Highway in 2006, another largely well-received album.

In August 2006, the band released a remake of "Marching to the Heartbeats" from Somewhere Along the Highway entitled "Heartbeats" solely on the internet community MySpace. The song was available for download for a few days and was later removed. The point was to see if the song would be kept alive by file sharing, and was also apparently a statement against the conservative music industry, said keyboardist Anders Teglund in an interview.

=== Eternal Kingdom (2008–2011) ===
In 2008 the band released its fifth album, Eternal Kingdom. It was released in Europe on 16 June, followed by its release in the United States on 8 July.

In 2009 they released the Fire Was Born DVD including a live performance from 2008, an interview with the band, as well as all of the band's videos.

On 18 October 2009, the band released Eviga riket, a hardback book/audiobook covering the story and themes from Eternal Kingdom. The book and audiobook are bilingual, printed and spoken both in Swedish and English. The audiobook contains new pieces of music and soundscapes written by the band. Eviga riket was released the 23 February 2010.

=== Vertikal and Vertikal II (2012–2015) ===
On 8 October 2012, the band announced the title of their sixth studio album as Vertikal, as well as the first leg of their upcoming European tour. The release dates were confirmed as 5 November, with the European release on 25 January 2013, and the American release four days later on 29 January 2013. A companion EP, Vertikal II was released on 20 September 2013. It includes the three songs with which Cult of Luna intended to conclude Vertikal as well as a remix of "Vicarious Redemption" by Justin Broadrick.

On 17 December 2013, the band announced that they'd be taking a break of sorts for the foreseeable future stating "2013 have been a very active year for us and neither do we want or think it is good to continue in that pace" they also said "Sooner or later we will return in one form or another".

In May 2014 the band curated the Beyond The Redshift festival in London, held across 3 venues with Cult Of Luna closing the festival with a headlining set at the Forum.

=== New lineup and Mariner with Julie Christmas (2016–2018) ===
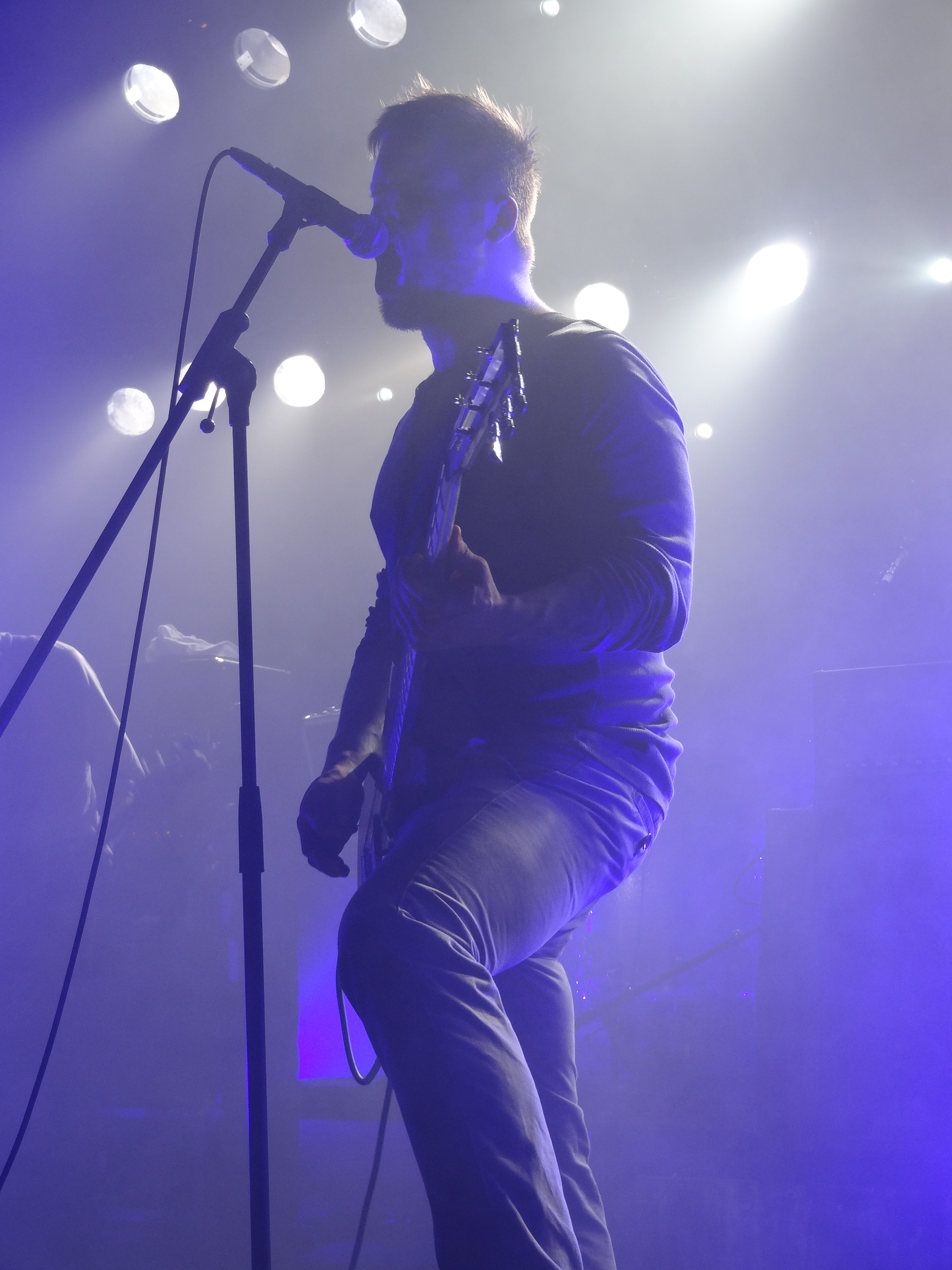
Guitarist/vocalist Johannes Persson

During the recording sessions and supporting tours for Vertikal, Cult of Luna made two major lineup changes that weren't publicly addressed until 2016. While recording the album in 2012, keyboardist Anders Teglund "left the band unexpectedly" and later was replaced by Kristian Karlsson of Pg Lost. Founding guitarist Erik Olofsson told the band he wished to leave, and his final live performance with the band became 2014's Beyond the Redshift festival. Cult of Luna stated that while he is no longer a full-time member, "he is still a part of the Cult of Luna universe." He has been temporarily replaced by David Johansson of Kongh.

On 8 April 2016, Cult of Luna released its seventh studio album titled Mariner — a collaborative release with the American vocalist Julie Christmas, formerly of Made Out of Babies and Battle of Mice. Contrasting the industrial- and city-focused Vertikal, Mariner explores themes relating to outer space.

Before Mariner was officially released, Cult of Luna had already begun writing new music for their eighth studio album. Persson stated that the band already had the album's concept and theme in mind, stating: "The last few records have been this kind of continuous journey from the forest to the sky and I know where we're going after this."

Johannes Persson stated in an interview in April 2016 that in 2013 he never talked about taking a break as previously reported, "what I wanted to say [...] is that we didn't have anything planned for the future" and added "for sure I never used the word hiatus".

In December 2016 Cult of Luna announced new live release Years in a Day scheduled for 21 April 2017. A live bundle limited to 7000 copies would feature a DVD of a show in Paris from the Somewhere Along the Highway 10th anniversary tour in 2015, 2 CDs featuring the band's performances at the Roadburn Festival in 2013 and 2016, digital audio and some other bonuses. Preorders of Years in a Day started on 20 January 2017 along with preorders of two live vinyl albums from the shows at Roadburn Festival in 2013 and 2016. These are the same as those included on CD in Years in a Day. The two live vinyl albums are limited to 500 copies each. A live triple disc vinyl album from the show at La Gaîté Lyrique in Paris, which is the same as on the DVD in Years in a Day, was also released on 21 April 2017. The vinyl is limited to 1000 copies on orange vinyl with yellow splatter. It was also released on black vinyl and CD.

In November 2017 Cult of Luna announced the release of live album and documentary Mariner Live in April 2018. Prior to the official release, the band released a short version of the documentary on the making of the Mariner album and the tour in support of it on the band's YouTube channel. The live album features the entire performance of Mariner which was recorded in November 2016 in Kortrijk, Belgium .

=== A Dawn to Fear (2019–2020) ===
At the end of 2018, Cult of Luna announced the beginning of recording sessions and posted teaser photos from the studio on band's social media throughout 2019. A number of 2019 European summer festival appearances were confirmed along the way. On 20 March 2019 the band announced signing a deal with Metal Blade Records and first batch of European tour dates scheduled for autumn 2019. On 6 May 2019, the new song "The Silent Man" became available on all platforms, and the band announced that A Dawn to Fear would be released on 20 September 2019. Loudwire named it one of the 50 best metal albums of 2019.

=== The Raging River and The Long Road North (2021–2025) ===
On 12 November 2020 Cult of Luna announced the release of a new EP titled The Raging River for 5 February 2021 through their own newly founded label Red Creek Recordings. "The Raging River feels more like a bridge. A midpoint that needs to be crossed so we can finish what we started with 2019's 'A Dawn to Fear,'" the band adds.

On 11 February 2022, Cult of Luna released their ninth studio album titled The Long Road North.

=== In the Shadow of Your Shadow (2026–present) ===
On 12 June 2026, Cult of Luna announced their tenth studio album, In the Shadow of Your Shadow, which is scheduled for release on 6 November 2026.

== Musical style and influences ==
Cult of Luna is considered to be at the forefront of the post-metal genre, along with contemporary proponents Neurosis and Isis. The band's songs are often long, slow, repetitive and crushing, heavy sections of distorted guitars often interspersed with orchestral interludes and extended, post-rock-esque forays. The group shuns conventional song structures, opting for a sound that evolves throughout a song, sometimes toward a climactic crescendo, instead of a verse-chorus-verse pattern. That style, incorporating sections of "light and dark" into their music, has led to comparisons with contemporaries such as Isis (with whom they have toured), Callisto and Pelican, as well as the significantly older Neurosis. Former singer Klas Rydberg has named Radiohead as an influence.

== Band members ==
=== Current ===
- Magnus Líndberg – percussion, guitar (1998–present)
- Johannes Persson – guitars, vocals (1998–present)
- Andreas Johansson – bass (2002–present)
- Thomas Hedlund – drums (2003–present)
- Fredrik Kihlberg – guitar, vocals (2004–present)
- Kristian Karlsson – keyboards, electronics, vocals (2013–present)

=== Former ===
- Klas Rydberg – vocals (1998–2012)
- Erik Olofsson – guitar (1999–2014)
- Fredrik Renström – bass (1999)
- Marco Hildén – drums (1999–2002)
- Axel Stattin – bass (2000–2002)
- Anders Teglund – keyboards, electronics (2003–2013)

==== Touring musicians ====
- Christian Augustin – drums, guitar (2013–present)
- Jonas Nordstrom – keyboards, electronics (2013)
- David Johansson – guitar (2016-2017)
- Daniel Berglund – secondary drums and percussions (2022)

== Discography ==
=== Studio albums ===
List of studio albums, with selected chart positions
| Title | Album details | Chart positions | | | | | |
| Title | Album details | SWE | BEL (FL) | FIN | GER | SWI | UK Rock |
|---|---|---|---|---|---|---|---|
| Cult of Luna | Released: 14 September 2001; Label: Rage of Achilles; Format: CD, Vinyl | — | — | — | — | — | — |
| The Beyond | Released: 10 February 2003; Label: Earache; Format: CD, Vinyl | — | — | — | — | — | — |
| Salvation | Released: 4 October 2004; Label: Earache; Format: CD, Vinyl | — | — | — | — | — | — |
| Somewhere Along the Highway | Released: 24 April 2006; Label: Earache; Format: CD, Vinyl | 59 | — | — | — | — | 22 |
| Eternal Kingdom | Released: 16 June 2008; Label: Earache; Format: CD, Vinyl | 47 | — | — | — | — | — |
| Vertikal | Released: 25 January 2013; Format: CD, Vinyl | 30 | 177 | 14 | — | — | 29 |
| Mariner (with Julie Christmas) | Released: 8 April 2016; Label: Indie; Format: CD, vinyl, digital download | 28 | 193 | 29 | — | 76 | 16 |
| A Dawn to Fear | Released: 20 September 2019; Label: Metal Blade; Format: CD, vinyl, digital download | — | 177 | — | 11 | 40 | 8 |
| The Long Road North | Released: 11 February 2022; Label: Metal Blade; Format: CD, vinyl, digital download | — | 93 | 16 | 14 | 29 | 5 |
| In the Shadow of Your Shadow | Released: 6 November 2026; Label: Red Crk; Format: CD, vinyl, digital download | — | 116 | — (Note: In the Shadow of Your Shadow did not enter the Finnish Top Albums chart, but peaked at number 10 on the Finnish Physical Albums chart.) | — | 74 | 27 |

=== EPs ===
- LUNA inc. demo (1999, self-released)
- Switchblade / Cult of Luna (split with Switchblade) (2000, Trust No One Recordings)
- Cult of Luna (2001, Hydra Head Records)
- Bodies / Recluse (Covers of The Smashing Pumpkins and Unbroken songs) (2006, Earache)
- Vertikal II (2013, Indie)
- Råångest (split with The Old Wind) (2015, Pelagic)
- The Raging River (2021, Red Creek)

=== Live albums ===
- Live at Roadburn 2013 (2017, Indie Recordings)
- Somewhere Along the Highway: Live at Roadburn 2016 (2017, Indie Recordings)
- Live at La Gâité Lyrique: Paris (2017, Indie Recordings)

=== Audio book soundtracks ===
- Eviga riket (2010)
- Eternal Music (2014)

=== Video album ===
- Fire Was Born (2009, Earache)
- Years in a Day (2017, Indie)
- Mariner Live (2018, Indie)

=== Music videos ===
| Year | Music video | Album | Video director | Ref |
|---|---|---|---|---|
| 2003 | "The Watchtower" | The Beyond | Pete Bridgewater | |
| 2005 | "Leave Me Here" | Salvation | Anders Forsman, Linus Johansson | |
| 2006 | "Back to Chapel Town" | Somewhere Along the Highway | Johannes Persson | |
| 2013 | "Passing Through" | Vertikal | Markus Lundqvist | |
| 2016 | "Chevron" | Mariner | Dave Longobardo | |
| 2019 | "The Silent Man" | A Dawn to Fear | Johannes Persson | |
| 2019 | "Lay Your Head to Rest" | A Dawn to Fear | Johannes Persson | |
| 2021 | "Cold Burn" | The Long Road North | North Kingdom Greenhouse | |
