= Julie Christmas =

American vocalist

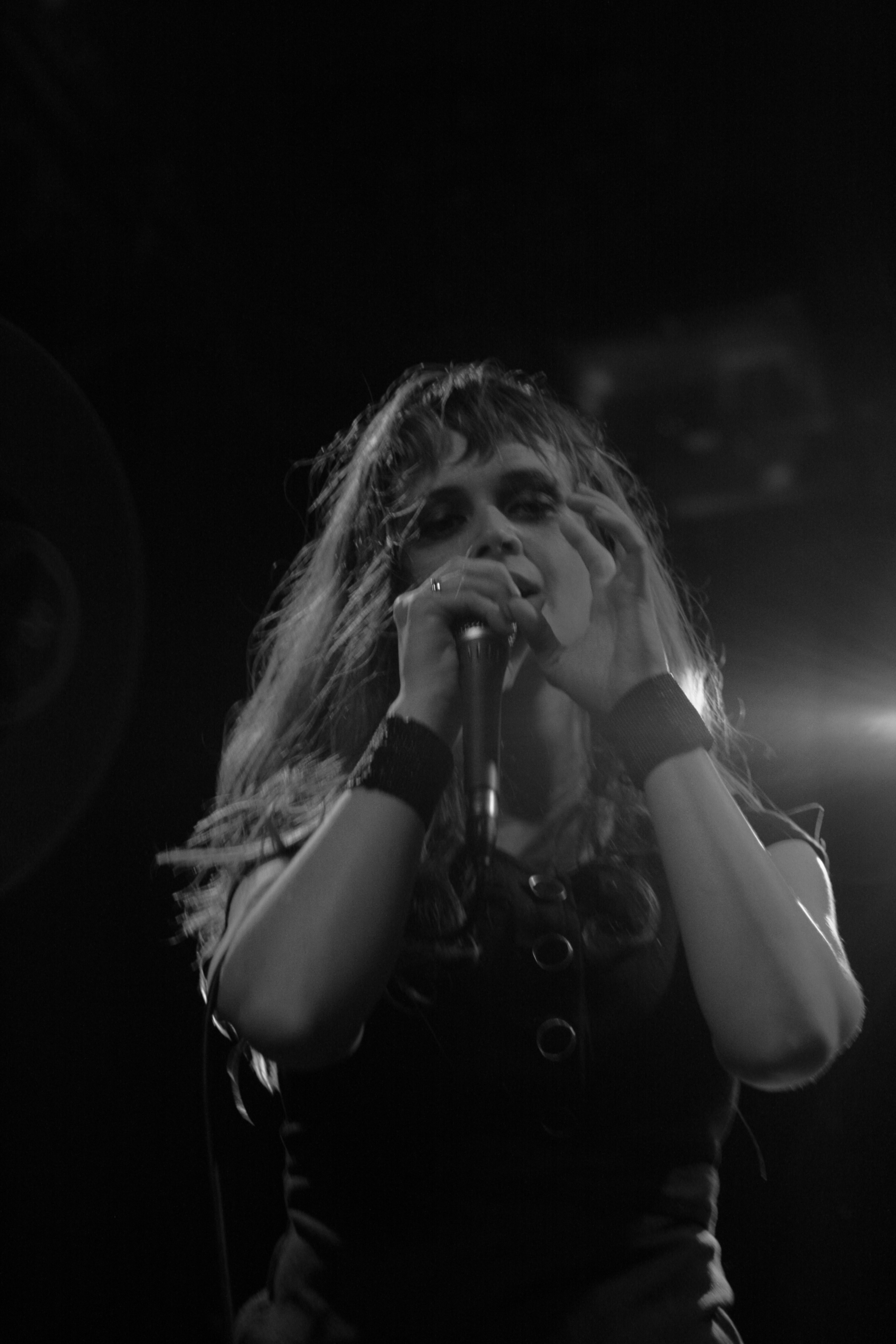
- Julie Christmas performing with Made Out of Babies in 2008 at New York's Knitting Factory.

Background information
- Born: December 25, 1975 (age 50); Brooklyn, New York, U.S.
- Genres: Post-metal, noise rock, post-hardcore, sludge metal, post-rock
- Occupation: Musician
- Instrument: Vocals
- Labels: Neurot, Rising Pulse, The End, Indie
- Formerly of: Made Out of Babies, Battle of Mice

Julie Christmas (born December 25, 1975) is an American musician from Brooklyn, New York. Christmas is her legal middle name; she was named so after the fact that she was born on Christmas day. She is the former lead singer of defunct Brooklyn-based noise rock band Made Out of Babies and the former lead singer of defunct post-metal supergroup Battle of Mice. In 2010, she released a critically acclaimed solo album titled The Bad Wife, and in 2016, she became a featured member on the Swedish post-metal band Cult of Luna's album Mariner.

== History ==
Julie Christmas spent the majority of the 2000s as the lead vocalist for the noise rock band Made Out of Babies and the short-lived post-metal supergroup Battle of Mice, the latter of which featured members of The Book of Knots, Neurosis and Red Sparowes. She sang on three studio albums with Made Out of Babies — Trophy (2005), Coward (2006) and The Ruiner (2008) — before the band went inactive for a few years and announced that it had officially broken up in 2012. Battle of Mice released one studio album — A Day of Nights (2006) — and a few EPs with Christmas before disbanding in 2009.

Julie Christmas provided vocals to the song "Generation of Ghosts" by Mouth of the Architect on their 2008 release Quietly.

Christmas is involved with Spylacopa, an experimental musical project headed by Candiria guitarist John LaMacchia, along with Greg Puciato of The Dillinger Escape Plan and Jeff Caxide of Isis. Spylacopa released a self-titled EP in 2008 followed by a studio album in 2015.

Julie Christmas released her debut solo album titled The Bad Wife in late 2010 through Rising Pulse Records. The album's lead single "July 31" was used in the final credits of the 2009 Cuba Gooding Jr. film Wrong Turn at Tahoe. Christmas said she used her solo career to creatively separate herself from her heavier main projects at the time. She said: "When we started working on The Bad Wife, I was involved in a few different projects that were rough, angry and involved a lot of screaming. I won't ever be able to separate myself from this kind of performance and I don't want to. I do know that, in day-to-day life, I get overwhelmed with emotion about things that have nothing to do with anger, just like everyone else. The project started as a way to show the importance of other feelings, like love." The album was critically acclaimed upon release. Iann Robinson of CraveOnline gave the album a nine-out-of-ten rating and said, "The Bad Wife is one of the best albums to come out this year, hands down." Christopher R. Weingarten of Spin praised the album and said, "Whether Christmas is headbanging or drowning, The Bad Wife is remarkably intimate, with the singer letting her voice crack, squeak, and gasp for air, finding the more revealing notes in between the notes."

At the time of The Bad Wife's release, Christmas was also said to be working on a book titled The Scribbles and Scrapes of Amy Anyone: (A Multiple Personality Autobiography), featuring illustrations from Nix Turner, who is known for her work on Emily the Strange. The book was to be accompanied by a musical album to be played while reading the book that would signal the reader when to turn the page.

In 2012, Christmas appeared on the record From Beyond Love by Strings of Consciousness. In 2015, she appeared as a guest on Pigs' album Wronger.

Christmas appeared as a featured guest on the Swedish post-metal band Cult of Luna's entire seventh studio album titled Mariner, released on April 8, 2016. Like the rest of the band's discography, Mariner is a concept album, which touches on themes of exploring outer space.

Christmas performed her first show in six years on March 6, 2023, at New York City's Saint Vitus Bar. Her backing band included Cult of Luna guitarist Johannes Persson. Christmas also played the Dutch metal Roadburn Festival in April 2023 after originally being scheduled for the canceled 2020 edition.

== Discography ==
=== Solo ===
- The Bad Wife (2010, Rising Pulse)
- Coextinction Records 5 (2011, Coextinction)
- Ridiculous and Full of Blood (2024, Red Creek)

=== Made Out of Babies ===
- Trophy (2005, Neurot)
- Coward (2006, Neurot)
- The Ruiner (2008, The End)

=== Battle of Mice ===
- Triad (split with Made Out of Babies and Red Sparowes) (2006, Neurot)
- A Day of Nights (2006, Neurot)
- Jesu / Battle of Mice (split with Jesu) (2008, Robotic Empire)

=== Spylacopa ===
- Spylacopa (2008, Rising Pulse)
- Parallels (2015, Rising Pulse)

=== Cult of Luna and Julie Christmas ===
- Mariner (2016, Indie)

=== Guest appearances ===
Year	Artist	Album	Track
2008	Mouth of the Architect	Quietly	"Generation of Ghosts"
2012	Strings of Consciousness	From Beyond Love	"The Drone from Beyond Love"
2015	Pigs	Wronger	"Bug Boy"
