= A Day of Nights =

Studio album by Battle of Mice
- Released: October 6, 2006
- Genre: Post-metal
- Length: 46:02
- Label: Neurot

Battle of Mice chronology
| Triad (2006) | A Day of Nights (2006) | Jesu / Battle of Mice (2008) |

Professional ratings
Review scores
| Source | Rating |
|---|---|
| Allmusic | 4/5 stars |

A Day of Nights is the only studio album by American post-metal band Battle of Mice. It was released on October 6, 2006, through Neurot Recordings label.

According to singer Julie Christmas, the album is "written in a timeline that mirrors what was happening between Josh [Graham] and me in our growing, and then rapidly decaying, relationship".

== Background ==
Battle of Mice formed in 2005 when vocalist Julie Christmas' band Made Out of Babies played South by Southwest with guitarist Josh Graham's band Red Sparowes. The two "hated each other immediately", according to Christmas, but when they toured the West Coast together, a "long-distance relationship ensued, the furious and occasionally harrowing nature of which is reflected in the music of Battle of Mice", with Graham in Los Angeles and Christmas in New York. The band then added Pere Ubu's Tony Maimone on bass and The Book of Knots' Joel Hamilton on guitar.

The album's track ordering chronicles the disintegration of Christmas and Graham's relationship. The band finished tracking five of the album's seven songs before the toxicity between Christmas and Graham created a working environment that was too uncomfortable for Maimone to continue in. By that point, the pair refused to be in the same room as each other, leading the guitars and the vocals to be completed on separate days. Christmas' vocals were recorded in one take without pre-written lyrics.

The song "At the Base of the Giant's Throat" contains a 911 call that Christmas states took one take to make. "I am actually not allowed to talk about that", she said. Before the album's closing song "Cave of Spleen" was recorded, a band member was reported to have "accidentally" fallen down a staircase.

== Track listing ==
| No. | Title | Length |
|---|---|---|
| 1. | "The Lamb and the Labrador" | 6:56 |
| 2. | "Bones in the Water" | 5:21 |
| 3. | "Sleep and Dream" | 5:58 |
| 4. | "Salt Bridge" | 5:49 |
| 5. | "Wrapped in Plain" | 5:32 |
| 6. | "At the Base of the Giant's Throat" | 9:10 |
| 7. | "Cave of Spleen" | 7:16 |

== Personnel ==
- Julie Christmas (Made Out of Babies) – vocals
- Josh Graham (ex-Neurosis, ex-Red Sparowes, A Storm of Light) – guitars, keyboards, and vocals
- Joel Hamilton (The Book of Knots) – guitar
- Tony Maimone (The Book of Knots, Pere Ubu) – bass
- Joe Tomino (Fugees, Dub Trio, Peeping Tom) – drums
