= Asymmetry Festival =

Annual music festival

- Genre: Rock stoner rock doom metal sludge metal progressive metal progressive rock black metal post-rock post-metal folk ambient experimental alt-country Jazz
- Dates: May
- Locations: Wrocław, Poland
- Years active: 2009–present
- Website: www.asymmetryfestival.pl/en

The Asymmetry Festival is an annual music festival, organized by Centre for Artistic Activities “Firlej” in Wrocław, Poland. The aim of the event is searching for artists experimenting in the stylistic of rock, metal and electronic music. The first edition took place in 2009.

== Current editions ==
=== Asymmetry Festival 2009 ===
The first edition took place between April 17–26, 2009.

Programme of the festival:

- April 17 - Baroness, Ufomammut, Lento (Klub Firlej)
- April 18 - 65daysofstatic, At the Soundawn, Tummo (Firlej)
- April 19 - Amenra, A Storm of Light, Tephra, Kingdom (Firlej)
- April 23 - Venetian Snares, Otto von Schirach (Mekka) (urodziny klubu)
- April 24 - Dälek, Mamiffer, Destructo Swarmbots, Oddateee (Firlej)
- April 25 - House of Low Culture, Lvmen, Ema Camelia, Yull, Drifted Shadows (Firlej)
- April 26 - Minsk, Blindead, This Will Destroy You, Tides from Nebula (Firlej)

Accompanying events:

- February 8 - Young Widows, Guantanamo Party Program (Firlej)
- March 3–21 - Neuro Music Contest Final (Firlej): Fifty Foot Woman, Forge of Clouds, Ketha, Proghma-C, Sway, Tides from Nebula, Dorena

=== Asymmetry Festival 2010 ===
The second edition took place between April 29 – May 3, 2010.

Programme of the festival:

- April 29 - The Mount Fuji Doomjazz Corporation, Zu, Bong-Ra, Drumcorps (Firlej)
- April 30 - Kylesa, Secret Chiefs 3, Year of No Light, Altar of Plagues, Dark Castle, Fat32 (Firlej)
- May 1 - Jesu, Black Shape of Nexus, Time to Burn, TesseracT, Kasan (Firlej)
- May 2 - Esoteric, Mouth of the Architect, Necro Deathmort, Moja Adrenalina (Firlej)
- May 3 - EZ3kiel (Wroclaw’s Fountain at the Pergola)

Accompanying events:

- December 12 - Callisto, Forge of Clouds
- April 9 - Neuro Music Contest Final (Firlej): Jarboe, Nachtmystium, PhobH, Maszyny i Motyle, MOANAA, Moja Adrenalina, Palm Desert, Ketha

=== Asymmetry Festival 2011 ===
The third edition took place between April 29 – May 3, 2011.

Programme of the festival:

- April 29 - Weedeater, Zoroaster, Oranssi Pazuzu, Bruce Lamont, Zoltar (Firlej)
- April 30 - Electric Wizard, Julie Christmas, The Secret, Kokomo, Dirk Serries a.k.a. Microphonics (Firlej)
- May 1 - Godflesh, Jucifer, The Orange Man Theory, Oozing Goo, Final, Elvis Deluxe (Firlej)
- May 3 - Aranis (saint Maria Magdalena Church)

Accompanying events:

- April 2 - Neuro Music Contest Final: Belzebong, Elvis Deluxe, Phobh, Sun For Miles, Ultimate Universe, Zoltar (Firlej)

=== Asymmetry Festival 2012 ===
The fourth edition took place between May 3–5, 2012 in a thoroughly new location – the Wroclaw-based Bourgeois Brewery.

Programme of the festival:

- May 3 - Sleep, Black Tusk, A Storm of Light, Red Fang, Vladimir Bozar ‘N’ Ze Sheraf Orkestär, Amenra, Coilguns, Earthship
- May 4 - Æthenor, The Ocean, Obake, Mombu, Ddekombinacja, Metazen, Kunz, Broken Note, Igorrr, Niveau Zero, Nicolas Chevreux, Codeshift, Veatxh
- May 5 - Killing Joke, Bohren & der Club of Gore, Celeste, The Ascent of Everest, A Whisper In the Noise, Joe Lally, Infekcja, My Own Private Alaska, Kiss Me Kojak, Ass to Mouth, We are Idols, Guananamo Party Program, Escape from Paris, Drom, Nod Nod, Thaw, Panacea

Asymmetry Festival 4.0 Before Parties:

- February 2 - Astronautalis, Bleubird, Slam poetycki (Puzzle)
- February 17 - Bong-Ra, Limewax, Thrasher, Rekombinacja, Macbeat (Log:In)
- March 16 - Peter Kurten, Brainpain, Moptron, Clicker (Log:In)

== Opinions and awards ==
The festival was mentioned on the pages of British music magazines The Wire and Rock-A-Rolla. The event was also included in the list of the most important music events according to the Polish “Dziennik” magazine. In 2009, Asymmetry Festival placed first in the poll of the “Gitarzysta” magazine readers (Musical Summary of the Year 2009), outrunning Przystanek Woodstock and the performance by Papa Roach. The festival was also included in the sum-up of the most important musical events of the year 2009 of “Gazeta Wyborcza”.
