= Quietly =

Quietly may refer to:

- Quietly, play by Owen McCafferty about a pub bombing in Northern Ireland, 2012
- Quietly (album), album by Mouth of the Architect, 2008
- "Quietly" (song), single by the Guano Apes
- Chup Chup Ke, or Quietly, a 2006 Indian film by Priyadarshan
