= Quietly (album) =

Studio album by Mouth of the Architect
- Released: 22 July 2008
- Recorded: 2008 at Red Room Recording and Woodshed Studios, Seattle
- Genre: Sludge metal
- Length: 55:46
- Label: Translation Loss
- Producer: Chris Common

Mouth of the Architect chronology
| The Ties That Blind (2006) | Quietly (2008) | Dawning (2013) |

Professional ratings
Review scores
| Source | Rating |
|---|---|
| About.com | 4/5 stars |
| Lambgoat | (8/10) |
| Rock Sound | (9/10) |
| Sonicfrontiers.net | (very positive) |

Quietly is the third studio album by the sludge metal band Mouth of the Architect. Recorded at Red Room Recording and Woodshed Studios in Seattle, WA, it was released on Translation Loss Records on 22 July 2008.

Following the departure of Gregory Lahm, original guitarist Alex Vernon returned to the band alongside new guitarist Steve Brooks. Kevin Schindel joined as permanent bassist. This left Watkins and Mann as the sole remaining members who recorded previous album The Ties That Blind. "Generation of Ghosts" features vocals by Julie Christmas (Battle of Mice, Made Out of Babies).

The album was released on gatefold CD, limited edition 300 translucent and rainbow splatter double LP and limited edition 700 solid black and white swirl double LP.

== Track listing ==
| No. | Title | Length |
|---|---|---|
| 1. | "Quietly" | 10:34 |
| 2. | "Hate and Heartache" | 7:33 |
| 3. | "Pine Boxes" | 3:55 |
| 4. | "Guilt and the Like" | 7:39 |
| 5. | "Generation of Ghosts" (feat. Julie Christmas) | 10:08 |
| 6. | "Rocking Chairs and Shotguns" | 6:52 |
| 7. | "Medicine" | 1:58 |
| 8. | "A Beautiful Corpse" | 7:04 |

== Personnel ==
- Alex Vernon – vocals, guitar
- Steven Brooks – vocals, guitar
- Kevin Schindel – vocals, bass guitar
- Jason Watkins – vocals, keyboards
- Dave Mann – drums
- Julie Christmas – vocals (track 5)
- Chris Common – producer, engineer, mixer
- Ed Brooks – mastering
- Faith Coloccia – drawings, design, photography
