= Dawning =

Dawning can refer to:

- Dawning Information Industry Company Limited, a Chinese supercomputer manufacturer, also known as Sugon
- Dawning (album)
- Dawn, the time of day

== See also ==
- Dawn (disambiguation)
