= Bird of Passage =

Bird of Passage or Birds of Passage may refer to:

- Bird of passage, a migratory bird, or, figuratively, an itinerant person

== Music ==
- Birds of Passage (band), a musical project of Alicia Merz
- Birds of Passage (album), by Bel Canto, 1989
- Birds of Passage, a 1987 album by Sadao Watanabe

== Theatre and film ==
- Birds of Passage (film), 2018 drama film
- Birds of Passage, 1983 play by Hanif Kureishi

== Literature ==
- The Bird of Passage, or, Flying Glimpses of Many Lands (1849) travelog by Isabella Frances Romer
- Birds of Passage: Migrant Labor and Industrial Societies (1979) nonfiction by Michael J. Piore
- Birds of Passage (1981) novel by Bernice Rubens
- Birds of Passage (1983) novel by Brian Castro
- Bird of Passage: Recollections of a Physicist (1985) autobiography by Rudolf Peierls
- Birds of Passage (1993) novel by Linda Leith
- Birds of Passage (2005) novel by Lou Drofenik

== Other uses ==
- Bird of Passage (biplane), a Voisin 1907 biplane owned by Lord Brabazon
