= The Kilimanjaro Darkjazz Ensemble =

Dark jazz Dutch band

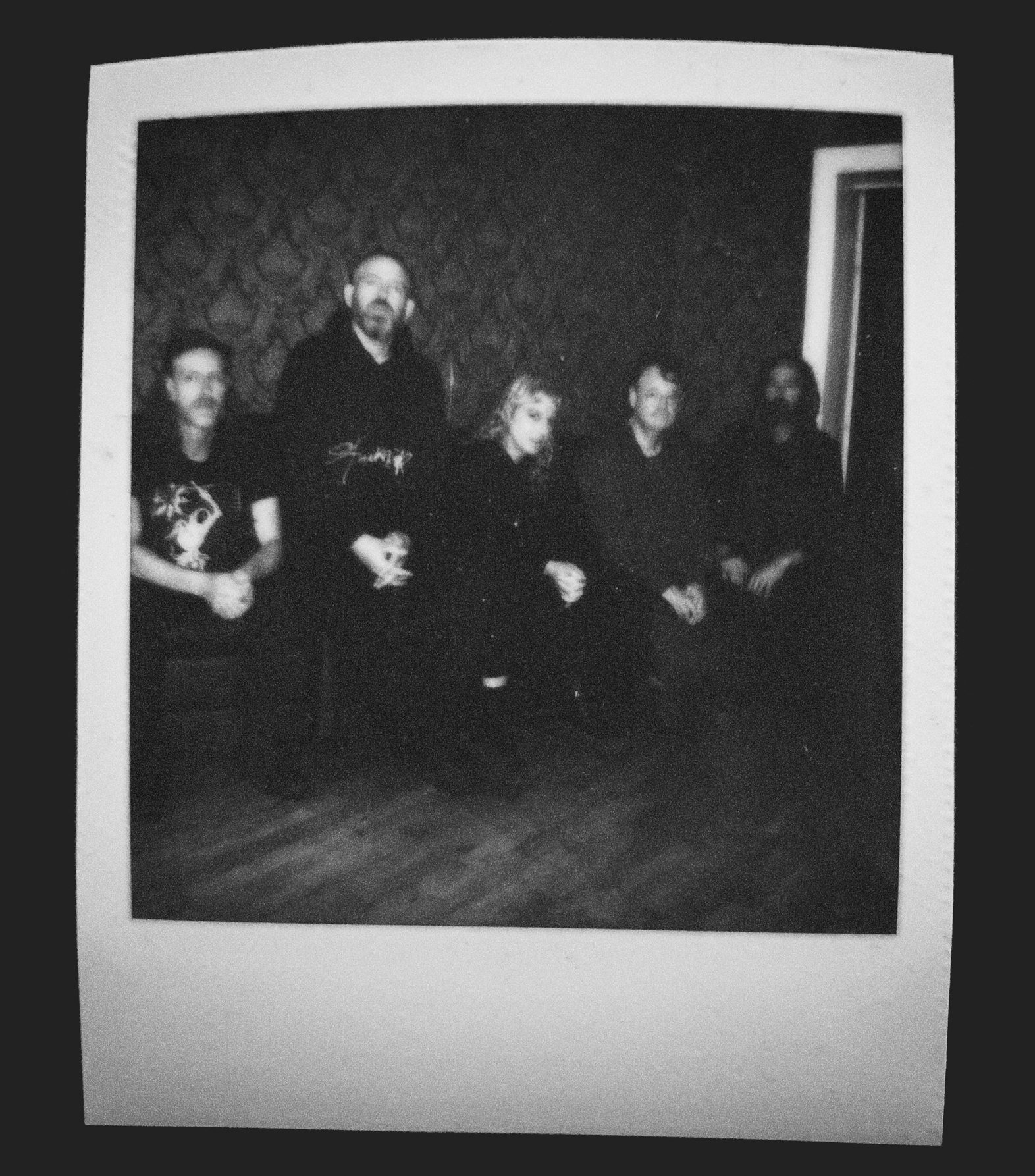
- The Kilimanjaro Darkjazz Ensemble

Background information
- Also known as: TKDE
- Origin: Utrecht, Netherlands
- Genres: Dark ambient, jazz, IDM, trip hop, avant-garde, electronic
- Years active: 1999–2013, 2025–present
- Labels: Planet Mu, Parallel Corners, Ad Noiseam, Denovali
- Spinoffs: The Mount Fuji Doomjazz Corporation
- Members: Jason Köhnen; Gideon Kiers; Hilary Jeffery; Charlotte Cegarra; Eelco Bosman
- Past members: Nina Hitz; Sarah Anderson
- Website: tkde.net

The Kilimanjaro Darkjazz Ensemble is a Dutch band formed in Utrecht, Netherlands, in 1999. The group is composed of Jason Köhnen, Gideon Kiers, trombonist Hilary Jeffery, cellist Nina Hitz, singer Charlotte Cegarra, guitarist Eelco Bosman, and violinist Sadie Anderson. Its live counterpart is The Mount Fuji Doomjazz Corporation.

== History ==
Köhnen and Kiers initially formed the group, often abbreviated as TKDE, in 1999 as a project for scoring silent movies such as Nosferatu and Metropolis. Köhnen and Kiers knew each other from studying at the Utrecht School of Arts. The hitherto electronic project was altered in 2004 when British trombonist Jeffery and Swiss cellist Hitz joined. As a quartet, the group released their debut album. Since then, the group has added Cegarra and Bosman in 2006, and Anderson in 2008. The group formed The Mount Fuji Doomjazz Corporation in 2007 as an improvisational side project. The group released their crowd-funded From the Stairwell in 2011. In late 2013, the group disbanded. Jason Köhnen confirmed this on his new project's Facebook page.

On January 22, 2025 via his email newsletter Jason Köhnen announced that both The Kilimanjaro Darkjazz Ensemble and The Mount Fuji Doomjazz Corporation are back: "After a hiatus of 12 years... I can proudly say that TKDE (and TMFDJC) are back together again... Stay tuned for upcoming news!" On February 12, 2025 it was officially announced that The Kilimanjaro Darkjazz Ensemble and The Mount Fuji Doomjazz Corporation will perform once again in their original line-up on August 29 2025 at Lido in Berlin, Germany.

On January 4, 2026 TKDE officially announced 10 new live shows for 2026 - and that "new music is slowly in the make and we hope to release something next year."

== Members ==
=== Current lineup ===
- Jason Köhnen – programming (1999–2006), production (1999–2006), bass (2004–2013, 2025–present), double bass (2004–2013), guitar (2004–2009), synthesizers (2006–2013), piano (2006–2013), theremin (2025–present)
- Gideon Kiers – programming (1999–2013, 2025–present), electronics (1999–2013, 2025–present), sequencing (1999–2013, 2025–present), beats (1999–2013, 2025–present), FX (1999–2013, 2025–present), production (1999–2013, 2025–present), drums (2006–2013), modular synthesizer (2025–present)
- Hilary Jeffery – trombone (2004–2013, 2025–present), oscillator (2006–2013, 2025–present)
- Charlotte Cegarra – vocals (2006–2013, 2025–present), flute (2008–2013), xylophone (2008–2009), piano (2009–2013, 2025–present), Rhodes piano (2009–2013, 2025–present), FX (2009–2013, 2025–present)
- Eelco Bosman – guitar (2006–2013, 2025–present), FX (2009–2013, 2025–present)

=== Former members ===
- Nina Hitz – cello (2004–2013)
- Sarah "Sadie" Anderson – violin (2008–2013)

=== Live members ===
- Eiríkur Orri Ólafsson – trumpet (2011) (also appeared on "From The Stairwell" (track "Celladoor"))
- Ron Goris – sound engineer

=== Session musicians ===
- Godfried Satan – vocals (2009, on "Bird's Lament - Tribute To Moondog")
- Coen Kaldeway – saxophone, bass clarinet (2011, on "From The Stairwell" (track "Giallo"))
- Miodrag Gladović – trombone (2025) (also appeared on "Live in Berlin [Reunion Show]" (track "The MacGuffin | Reprise"))

== Discography ==
Studio albums

- 2006 – The Kilimanjaro Darkjazz Ensemble (Planet Mu, reissued by Denovali Records)
- 2009 – Here Be Dragons (Ad Noiseam, reissued by Denovali Records)
- 2011 – From the Stairwell (Denovali Records)

Live albums

- 2011 – I Forsee The Dark Ahead, If I Stay (Parallel Corners, reissued by Denovali Records)
- 2026 – Live in Berlin [Reunion Show] (Parallel Corners)

EP

- 2009 – Mutations (Ad Noiseam, reissued by Denovali Records)

Singles

- 2009 – Adaptation of Saint Vitus 'Patra' (Parallel Corners, cover of Saint Vitus)
- 2009 – Palace of the Tiger Women (Parallel Corners, Ad Noiseam, remixes split single with Kava Kon)
- 2009 – Bird's Lament - Tribute to Moondog (Parallel Corners, cover of Moondog)
- 2009 – Two Live Tracks (aka Black Wing Butterfly / Goya) (Ad Noiseam, Parallel Corners)
- 2010 – Dark Night of the Soul (Parallel Corners, cover of Danger Mouse, Sparklehorse and David Lynch)
- 2012 – Xtabay (Parallel Corners)
- 2016 – Virgin Lava (actually re-issue of Palace of the Tiger Women (2009) plus one unreleased original song by Kava Kon)

In 2016 Denovali Records started re-releasing the complete back catalogue of the band.
