= Path of Eight =

Studio album by Mouth of the Architect
- Released: 7 October 2016
- Recorded: April 2016
- Genre: Sludge metal
- Length: 44:00
- Label: Translation Loss
- Producer: Steve Brooks, John Lakes

Mouth of the Architect chronology
Dawning (2013)	Path of Eight (2016)

Professional ratings
Review scores
Source	Rating
Metal Storm	(9.5/10)
New Noise Magazine	(3.5/5)
Toilet ov Hell	(4.5/5)

Path of Eight is the fifth studio album by the atmospheric sludge metal band Mouth of the Architect. Recorded over a weekend at the bands’ rehearsal space in Dayton, Ohio, it was released on Translation Loss Records on 7 October 2016.

The album was released on digipack CD, limited edition 300 red and gray mix LP and 700 black LP.

== Track listing ==
No.	Title	Length
1.	"Ritual Bell"	4:26
2.	"Fever Dream"	5:51
3.	"The Priestess"	6:02
4.	"Sever the Soul"	5:55
5.	"Drown the Old"	4:53
6.	"Stretching Out"	7:19
7.	"Fallen Star"	5:33
8.	"Path of Eight"	4:08

== Personnel ==
- Steve Brooks – vocals, guitar, producer
- John Lakes – vocals, guitar, producer
- Jason Watkins - vocals, keyboards
- Dave Mann - drums
- Evan Danielson – bass
- Chris Common – mixing, mastering
