= Jesu/Battle of Mice =

EP by Jesu and Battle of Mice
- Released: August 4, 2008
- Genre: Post-metal
- Length: 30:05
- Label: Robotic Empire
- Producer: Justin Broadrick, Joel Hamilton

Jesu chronology
Envy/Jesu (2008)	Jesu/Battle of Mice (2008)	Why Are We Not Perfect? (2008)

Battle of Mice chronology
A Day of Nights (2006)	Jesu/Battle of Mice (2008)

Professional ratings
Review scores
Source	Rating
Scene Point Blank	8.2 stars on a 10 point scale
Teeth of the Divine	favorable

Jesu/Battle of Mice is a split EP between British post-rock band Jesu and American post-metal super group Battle of Mice. It was released through Robotic Empire on August 4, 2008. The Jesu tracks were recorded and produced by Justin Broadrick while the Battle of Mice tracks were produced by guitarist Joel Hamilton. The album was mastered by Nick Zampiello.

== Track listing ==
”Clear Stream”, “Falling from Grace” by Jesu. “The Bishop”, “Yellow and Black” by Battle of Mice.

No.	Title	Length
1.	"Clear Stream"	8:08
2.	"Falling from Grace"	7:22
3.	"The Bishop"	6:51
4.	"Yellow and Black"	7:44
Total length:		30:05

== Personnel ==
Jesu

- Justin Broadrick – vocals, instrumentation, lyrics
- Diarmuid Dalton – bass (track 2)

Battle of Mice

- Tony Maimone - bass
- Joe Tomino – drums
- Joel Hamilton – guitar
- Josh Graham – guitar, keyboards, vocals
- Julie Christmas - vocals

Production

- Justin Broadrick – engineering, producer (tracks: 1, 2)
- Joel Hamilton – engineering, producer (tracks: 3, 4)
- Josh Graham – artwork
- Nick Zampiello - mastering
