= A Dead Forest Index =

Australian musical project

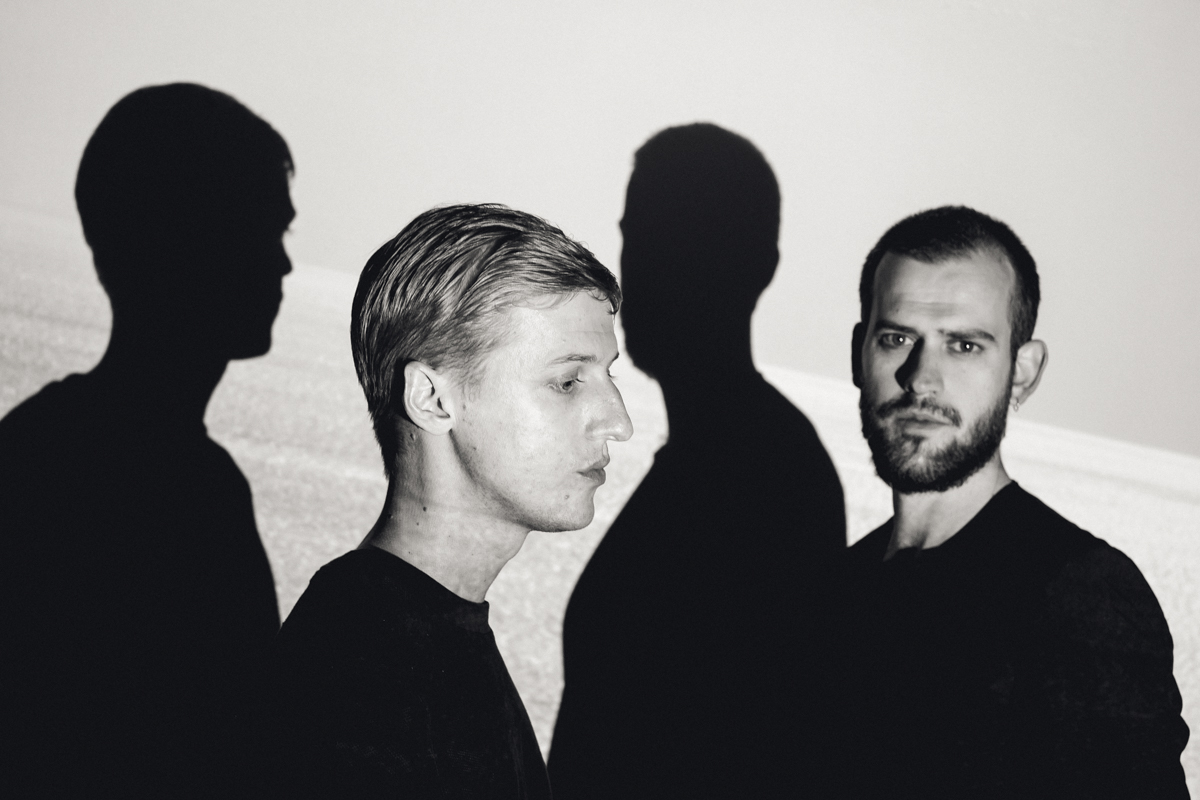

Background information
- Origin: Melbourne, Australia
- Genres: Dark folk; art pop; alternative
- Years active: 2008 - current
- Labels: Denovali, Pop Noire, Sargent House
- Spinoffs: Unmoor Kiva
- Members: Adam Sherry, Sam Sherry

A Dead Forest Index is a musical project formed by brothers Adam Sherry and Sam Sherry in 2008 in Melbourne, Australia.

== History ==
Adam and Sam Sherry are originally from New Zealand, writing and performing as a minimalist two-piece, based between Melbourne and London.

In 2012, A Dead Forest Index released an EP entitled Antique with Denovali Records and in 2013 the duo were invited to support the band Savages on a UK tour. Following on from supporting Savages, having caught the attention of Savages’ singer and Pop Noire label co- founder Jehnny Beth, the duo released the EP Cast of Lines with the label Pop Noire in 2014.

The duo released their debut album In All That Drifts from Summit Down with US label Sargent House in 2016 and were invited to support Chelsea Wolfe on a tour of North America.

In 2017, A Dead Forest Index were invited to collaborate with the Italian dance company Dewey Dell to compose a choral composition inspired by the Sardinian Cantu a tenores. The composition Deriva Traversa was premiered at festivals Danza Urbana in Bologna and Città delle 100 Scale Festival in Matera.

== Other projects ==
In 2015, A Dead Forest Index collaborated with the band Savages when they were invited to write and perform together as an ensemble alongside choreographer/dance artist Fernanda Muñoz-Newsome for Doug Aitken’s Station to Station Festival at the Barbican. The performance of the piece In What I’m Seeing: The Sun was recorded live onto vinyl.

In 2018, Adam and Sam Sherry formed the trio Unmoor Kiva with Savages’ guitarist Gemma Thompson.

== Members ==
Adam Sherry - vocals, guitar

Sam Sherry - vocals, percussion

== Discography ==
Year	Title	Format	Label
2012	Antique	EP	Denovali
2014	Cast of Lines	EP	Pop Noire
2016	No Paths	Single	Sargent House
2016	Myth Retraced	Single	Sargent House
2016	In All That Drifts from Summit Down	Album	Sargent House

=== Collaborative albums ===
In What I'm Seeing; The Sun (2015) (with Savages)
