= Time and Withering =

Studio album by Mouth of the Architect
- Released: 2004
- Recorded: May 2004 at Cylo Studios, Nashville, TN
- Genre: Sludge metal
- Length: 39:18
- Label: Translation Loss
- Producer: Chris Common

Mouth of the Architect chronology
Time and Withering (2004)	The Ties That Blind (2006)

Professional ratings
Review scores
Source	Rating
Allmusic	3.5/5 stars

Time and Withering is the debut album by the sludge metal band Mouth of the Architect. Recorded at Cylo Studios in Nashville, TN, between 14 and 16 May 2004. It was released on Translation Loss Records on CD only in 2004.

== Track listing ==
No.	Title	Length
1.	"A Vivid Chaos"	12:07
2.	"Soil to Stone"	11:24
3.	"Heart Eaters"	4:57
4.	"The Worm"	10:51

== Personnel ==
- Alex Vernon – vocals, guitar
- Gregory Lahm – vocals, guitar
- Jason Watkins - vocals, keyboards
- Derik Sommer – bass guitar
- Dave Mann - drums
- Chris Common - producer, engineer, mixer, mastering
- Dan Rizer - layout
- Germ? - sketches
