= The Ties That Blind =

Studio album by Mouth of the Architect
- Released: 22 August 2006
- Recorded: 2006 at Red Room Recordings, Seattle, WA
- Genre: Sludge metal
- Length: 66:10
- Label: Translation Loss
- Producer: Chris Common

Mouth of the Architect chronology
Time and Withering (2004)	The Ties That Blind (2006)	Quietly (2008)

Professional ratings
Review scores
Source	Rating
Allmusic	4/5 stars
Lambgoat	9/10 stars
Sea of Tranquility	4/5 stars

The Ties That Blind is the second studio album by the sludge metal band Mouth of the Architect. Recorded at Red Room Recordings in Seattle, WA, it was released on Translation Loss Records on 22 August 2006.

Prior to recording, Alex Vernon left the group, leaving Gregory Lahm to record all guitar parts. Without a bassist since the departure of Derik Sommer, Brian Cook of These Arms Are Snakes filled in to write and record all bass parts. "At Arms Length" features vocals by Brent Hinds (Mastodon).

The album was released on CD, limited edition 300 red double LP (a few of these copies came with a "black smoke" effect) and limited edition 700 black double LP.

== Track listing ==
No.	Title	Length
1.	"Baobab"	10:30
2.	"No One Wished To Settle Here"	15:36
3.	"Carry On"	12:09
4.	"Harboring An Apparition"	7:55
5.	"At Arms Length" (features Brent Hinds of Mastodon)	7:04
6.	"Wake Me When It's Over"	12:53

== Personnel ==
- Gregory Lahm – vocals, guitar
- Jason Watkins - vocals, keyboards
- Dave Mann - drums
- Brian Cook – bass guitar
- Brent Hinds - vocals (track 5)
- Chris Common - producer, engineer, mixer
- Ed Brooks - mastering
- Paul Jeffrey - design, layout
