= Denovali Records =

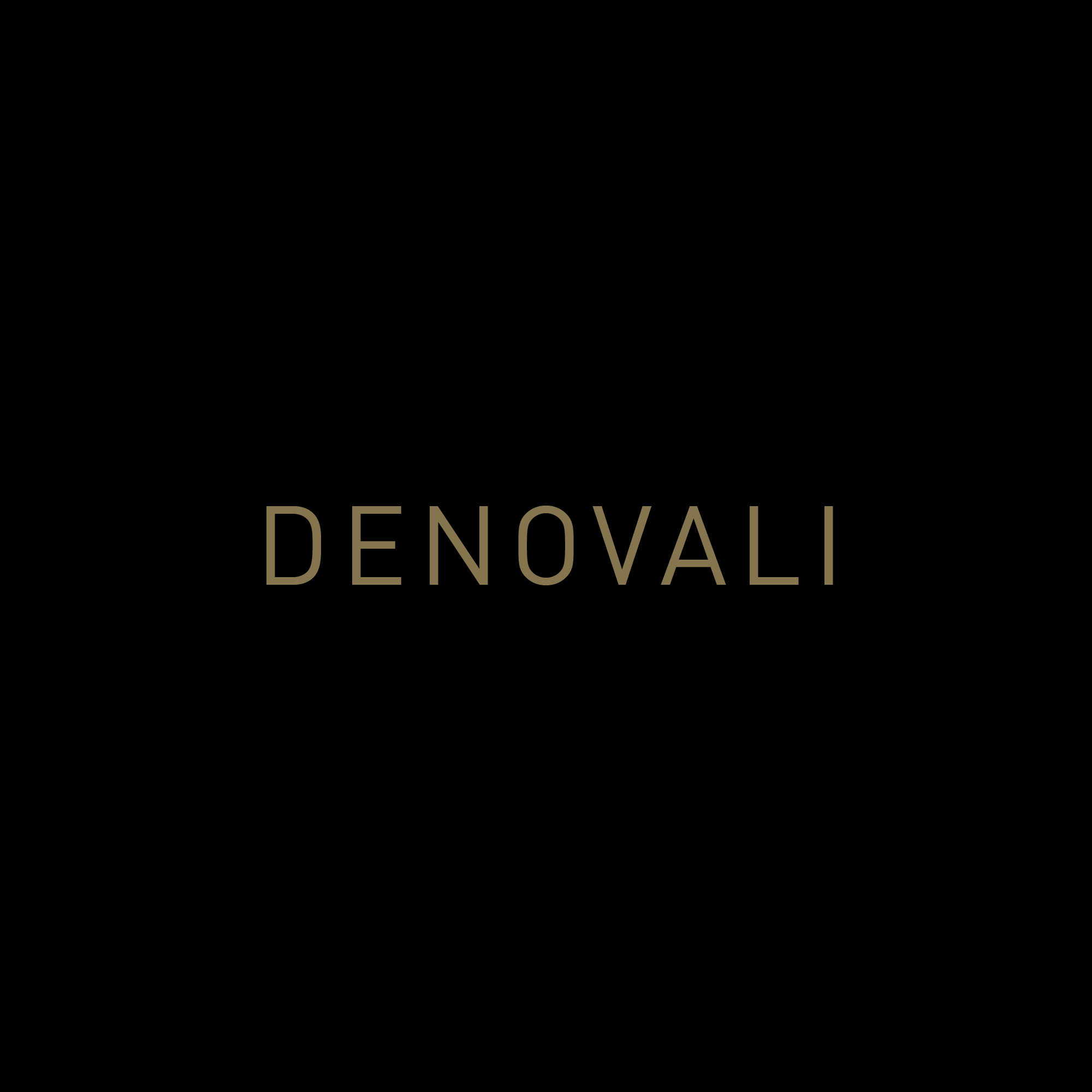
- Founded: 2005
- Genre: Experimental, electronic, contemporary classical, jazz
- Country of origin: Germany
- Official website: denovali.com

Denovali Records is an independent record label founded in 2005. The program of Denovali covers ambient, electronica, experimental, drone, jazz, modern composition & sound art. Since 2007 Denovali curates and organizes international music festivals. In line with the start of the label activities in 2005 Denovali opened an online record store also featuring records from other record labels.

== Current artists (selection) ==
- Ah! Kosmos
- Bersarin Quartett
- Birds Of Passage
- Blackfilm
- Blueneck
- Celeste
- Contemporary Noise Sextet
- David Norland
- Dictaphone
- Elektro Guzzi
- Ensemble Economique
- Field Rotation
- Floex
- Franz Kirmann
- Fogh Depot
- Greg Haines
- Hidden Orchestra
- John Lemke
- Kuba Kapsa
- Lento
- Les Fragments De La Nuit
- Mario Diaz De Leon
- Matthew Collings
- Michael Vallera
- Moon Zero
- Multicast Dynamics
- N
- Nadia Struiwigh
- Never Sol
- Omega Massif
- Oneirogen
- Origamibiro
- Orson Hentschel
- Paco Sala
- Pan & Me
- Philipp Rumsch
- Piano Interrupted
- Petrels
- Prairie
- Ricardo Donoso
- Robin Schlochtermeier
- Saffronkeira
- Sankt Otten
- Second Moon Of Winter
- Selaxon Lutberg
- Subheim
- Switchblade
- Talvihorros
- Terminal Sound System
- The Alvaret Ensemble
- The Dale Cooper Quartet
- The Eye Of Time
- The Kilimanjaro Darkjazz Ensemble
- The Mount Fuji Doomjazz Corporation
- The Pirate Ship Quintet
- The Samuel Jackson 5
- Thomas Köner
- Waelder

== Past artists (selection) ==
- A Dead Forest Index
- Kodiak
- Mouse on the Keys
