= Celeste (band) =

French metal band

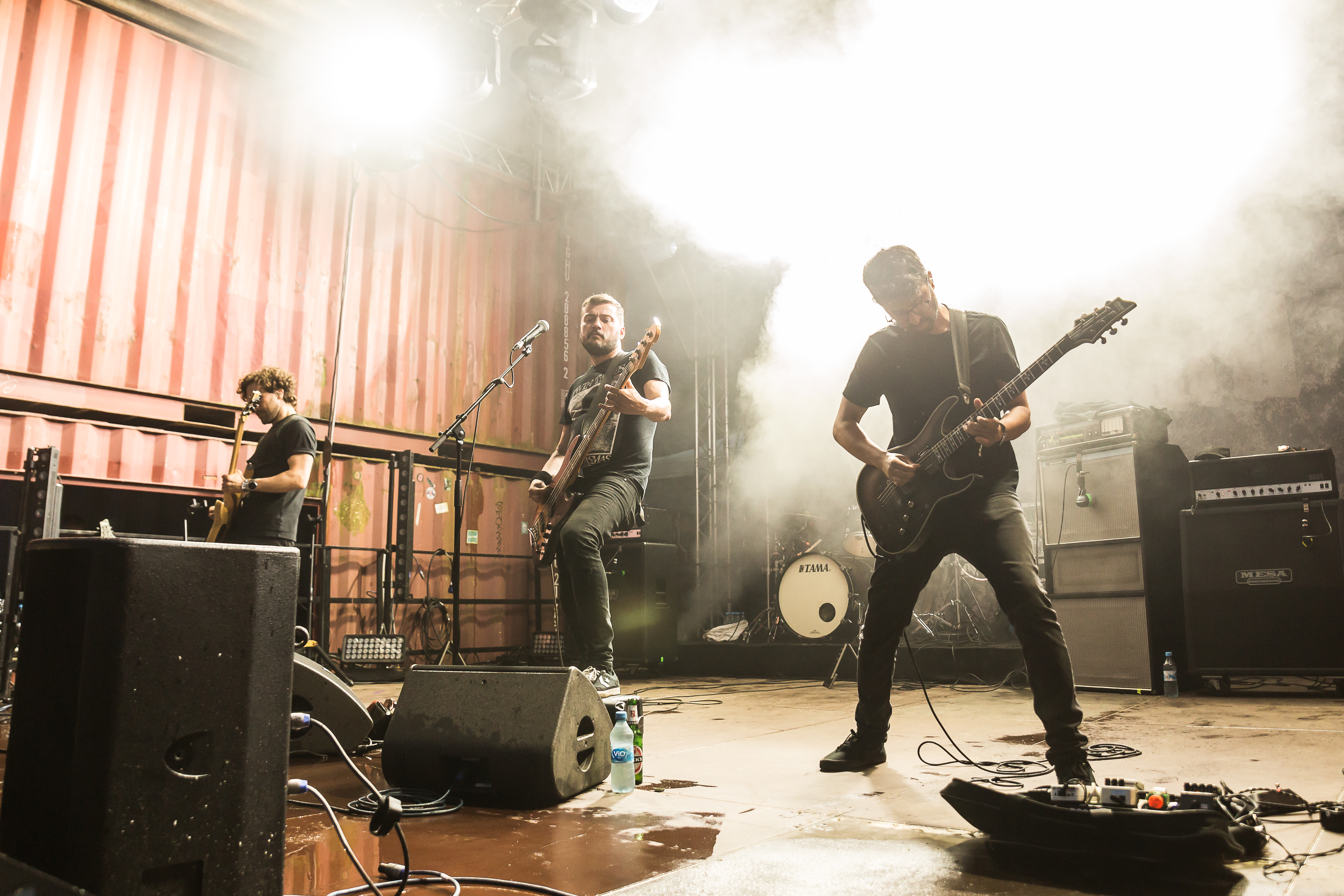
- Celeste at Full Force 2023

Background information
- Origin: Lyon, France
- Genres: Sludge metal; black metal; post-hardcore
- Years active: 2005–present
- Labels: Nuclear Blast; Denovali; Matrix
- Members: Johan Girardeau; Guillaume Rieth; Antoine Royer; Sébastien Ducotté
- Past members: Antoine Kerbrat

Celeste (stylised in all caps) are a French band from Lyon, founded in 2005. Combining black metal, sludge metal, and post-hardcore, they have released six albums to date.

== History ==
The band was founded 2005 in the Lyon hardcore punk scene. Guitarist Guillaume Rieth, drummer Antoine Royer, and bassist Antoine Kerbrat had known each other since high school, and recruited vocalist Johan Girardeau. Rieth and Girardeau are former members of the screamo band Mihai Edrisch, which had shared members with Daïtro. Kerbrat has since left the band, with Girardeau taking up bass and Sébastien Ducotté joining as second guitarist.

In 2006, Celeste released their first EP, followed in 2008 by their debut album, released by German label Denovali Records. Since then, they released four more albums and toured through Europe repeatedly and as far as Russia, Asia, and the US. In June 2021, the band signed to Nuclear Blast.

In 2025, Celeste's announced tour dates in Russia drew criticism in the metal press amid the ongoing Russian invasion of Ukraine. Following the announcement, the festival Bridges to Hell cancelled the band's appearance, citing the Russia tour announcement as the reason. The promoter Voulez Vous Danser stated it was not involved in organizing the Russia dates and did not support the initiative.

== Musical style ==
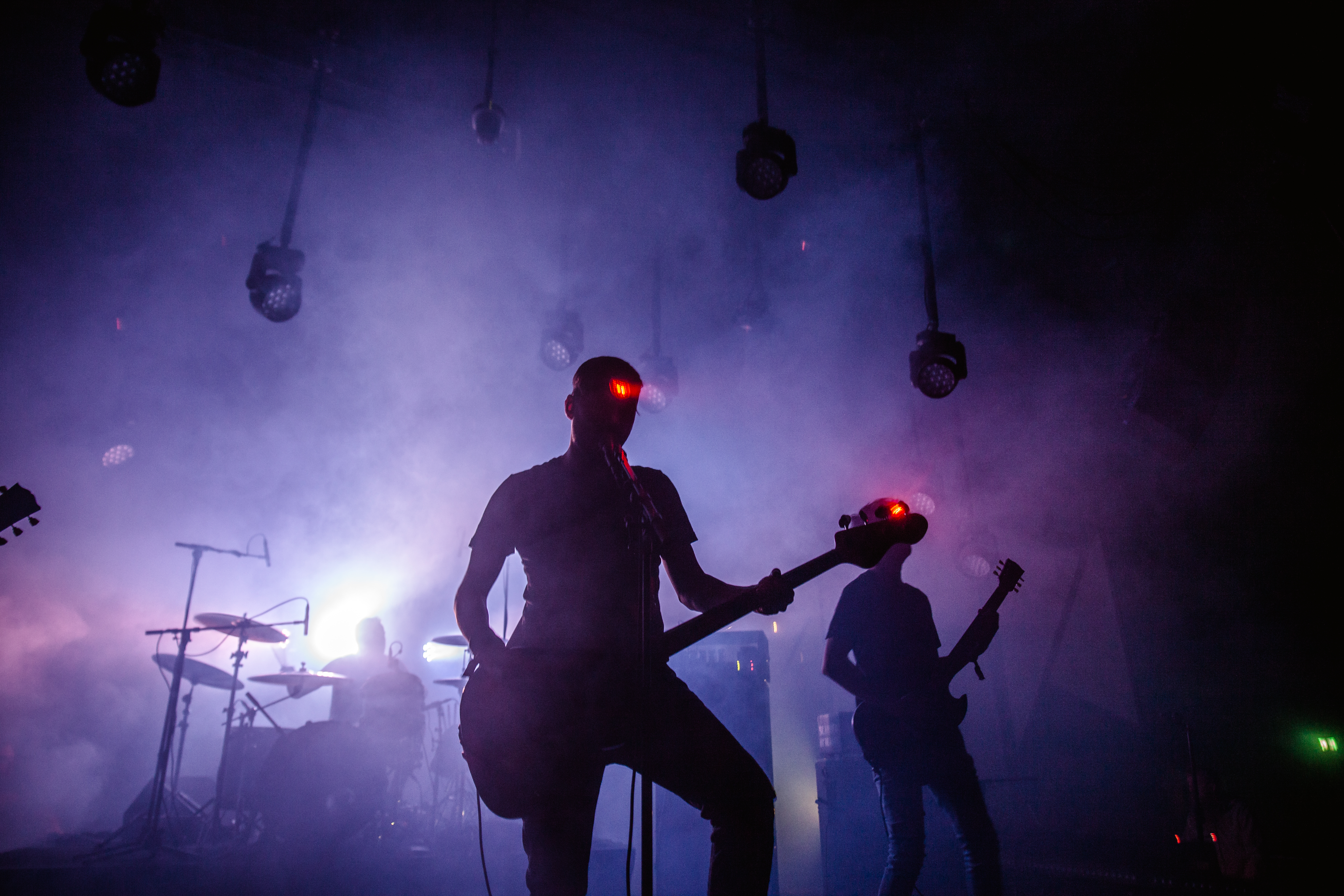
Celeste performing at Roskilde Festival 2018

The band play a mix of sludge, black metal and post-hardcore, with elements of doom metal and death metal. They refuse other bands as influences.

== Members ==
Current

- Johan Girardeau – vocals (2005–present), bass (2013–present)
- Guillaume Rieth – guitar (2005–present)
- Antoine Royer – drums (2005–present)
- Sébastien Ducotté – guitar (2013–present)

Former

- Antoine Kerbrat – bass (2005–2013)

== Discography ==
Studio albums

- Nihiliste(s) (2008)
- Misanthrope(s) (2009)
- Morte(s) Nee(s) (2010)
- Animale(s) (2013)
- Infidèle(s) (2017)
- Assassine(s) (2022)

EPs

- Pessimiste(s) (2006)
- Epilogue(s) (2023)
