= Mouth of the Architect =

American heavy metal band

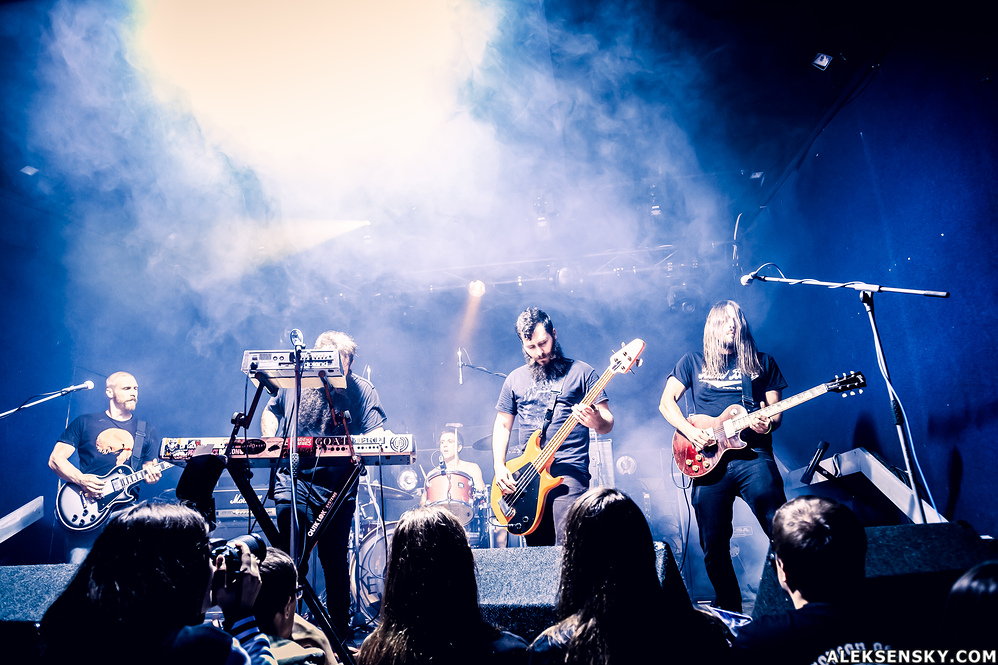
- Mouth of the Architect performing at Arktika Club, St. Petersburg, Russia in 2013

Background information
- Origin: Dayton, Ohio, United States
- Genres: Sludge metal post-metal doom metal
- Years active: 2003–present
- Label: Translation Loss
- Members: Dave Mann; Jason Watkins; Alex Vernon; Canada Marsh; Caleb Nason
- Past members: Kevin Schindel; Steve Brooks; Evan Danielson; John Lakes; Gregory Lahm; Derik Sommer

Mouth of the Architect is an American heavy metal band from Dayton, Ohio, creating music influenced by and similar to Neurosis, Isis, Pelican, Cult of Luna, and various post-metal bands. They are signed to Translation Loss Records and have released five full-length studio albums and one EP to date.

== Biography ==
Mouth of the Architect formed in 2003 with the lineup of Jason Watkins (vocals, keyboards), Gregory Lahm (vocals, guitar), Alex Vernon (vocals, guitar), Dave Mann (drums), and Derik Sommer (bass). They released their first album Time and Withering in 2004 on Translation Loss Records. Sommer departed the band in 2005.

Soon after the band released a split with label mates Kenoma in 2006, Vernon left, leaving Lahm to record all the guitar parts on their second album The Ties That Blind which was released in August, and featured Brent Hinds of Mastodon on guest vocals on one track. Brian Cook of Botch, Russian Circles, and These Arms are Snakes stood in to play bass on the album. To support The Ties That Blind, the band toured extensively around the United States, while weathering several line-up changes. In 2006 the band toured alongside These Arms Are Snakes, with Dan Wilburn of The Science Logic replacing Vernon on guitar. 2007 saw newcomer Steve Brooks replace Wilburn, followed by a year of near constant touring alongside bands including Mastodon, Rob Crow, Made Out of Babies, Big Business, Torche, Kylessa, 400 Blows, Skeletonwitch and Unsane, among others. The band featured Joe Lester of Intronaut and Kevin Schindel of Twelve Tribes on bass during this time.

Their third album, Quietly, was recorded after Lahm in turn left the band, with Vernon returning alongside Brooks to jointly handle guitars and vocals, and Schindel providing bass. Soon after the release of the album in 2008, Vernon left yet again with Schindel switching to guitar. An EP entitled The Violence Beneath followed in 2010, with a headlining European tour to support the record. The tour featured appearances at Roadburn Festival and Asymmetry Festival. Recorded in October 2009 by John Lakes, The Violence Beneath featured two new studio tracks with Joe Lester on bass, an old live track from 2007 as well as a Peter Gabriel cover with Lakes on bass. Evan Danielson joined as permanent bassist following its release. The band returned to the studio in October 2011 to lay down a track for French compilation Falling Down VII which was released the following April.

Their fourth full-length album, Dawning, was released in June 2013. Recorded at Brooks' studio in Michigan, the album was self-produced by Brookes and Lakes. A US/Canada tour with Intronaut and Scale the Summit and a headlining European tour took place that summer with Lakes filling in for Schindel during both legs of the tour on guitar. Lakes soon replaced Schindel as a full-time member.

Their fifth full-length album, Path of Eight, released in October 2016, was recorded live in the bands' rehearsal space in Dayton over a weekend. It is a concept album "about a soul leaving the body after death, traveling through space and time, past the gods, to be torn apart into the nothingness from which we came".

On 28 March 2018, the band announced the departure of Steve Brooks on their Facebook page and that founding member Alex Vernon had rejoined the band. On 20 April 2019 the band played their first, and seemingly only, gig with the new line-up (including the returning Vernon) at a festival in Gainesville, Florida, debuting 3 new songs. Since then it would seem the band are no longer active. Since 2022, Watkins has been a member of band called Oldspeak.

Schindel, Vernon, Mann and Brooks have been members of the band Twelve Tribes at various points in the past.

== Members ==
- Jason Watkins – vocals, keyboards, samples (2003–present)
- Dave Mann – drums (2003–present)
- Alex Vernon – guitar, vocals (2003-2005, 2007–2008, 2018-present)
- Canada Marsh - guitar (2018–present)
- Caleb Nason - bass (2018–present)

=== Former members ===
- Steve Brooks – guitar, vocals (2007–2018)
- Evan Danielson - bass guitar (2010–2017)
- John Lakes - guitar, vocals (2015–2017)
- Kevin Schindel – bass guitar, vocals (2007-2008), guitar, vocals (2008-2015)
- Gregory Lahm – guitar, vocals (2003-2007)
- Derik Sommer – bass guitar (2003-2005)

=== Session members ===
- Chris Common - bass guitar (Mouth of the Architect/Kenoma, 2006) Track: Sleepwalk Powder
- Brian Cook - bass guitar (The Ties That Blind, 2006)
- Joe Lester - bass guitar (The Violence Beneath, 2010)
- John Lakes - bass guitar (The Violence Beneath, 2010) Track: In Your Eyes

=== Touring members ===
- Dan Wilburn - guitar (live 2006)
- Zack Pahl - bass guitar (live 2006)
- Joe Lester - bass guitar (live 2006-2007)
- John Lakes - guitar, vocals (live 2009, 2013)
- Kevin Schindel – bass guitar, vocals (live 2007–2008, 2017)
- Tate Matthews - guitar (live 2017)

== Discography ==
- Time and Withering CD (2004, Translation Loss) (re-issued on LP in 2017)
- Mouth of the Architect/Kenoma split CD & LP (2006, Translation Loss) Track: Sleepwalk Powder
- The Ties That Blind CD & LP (2006, Translation Loss) (re-issued on CD & LP in 2018)
- For the Sick (Eyehategod tribute album, 2007, Emetic Records) Track: Story of the Eye
- Quietly CD & LP (22 July 2008, Translation Loss)
- The Violence Beneath EP CD (17 April 2010, Translation Loss)
- Falling Down IIV compilation album (28 April 2012, Falling Down) Track: How This Will End
- Dawning CD & LP (25 June 2013, Translation Loss)
- Path of Eight CD & LP (7 October 2016, Translation Loss)
