= Strings of Consciousness =

Eleven-piece band

- Years active: 2007–present
- Members: Karim Tobbi; Nicholas Dick; Raphaelle Rinaudo; Andy Diagram; Hervé Vincenti; Alison Chesley; Philippe Petit; Perceval Bellone; Hugh Hopper; Pierre Fenichel; Stefano Tedesco; Lenka Zupkova
- Website: www.stringsofconsciousness.info

Strings of Consciousness is an eleven-piece band formed by Herve Vincenti and Philippe Petit hailing from cities such as London, Chicago and Paris. Their debut album, Our Moon is Full (2008), was released on Barry Adamson's Central Control label and features guest vocalists such as Barry Adamson, J.G. Thirlwell and Black Sifichi.

== Members ==
- Karim Tobbi / Nicholas Dick – guitars
- Raphaelle Rinaudo – harp
- Andy Diagram – trumpet, electronics
- Hervé Vincenti – guitar, samplers
- Alison Chesley – cello
- Philippe Petit – theremin, laptop, turntables
- Perceval Bellone – saxophone, tibetan bowls, flute, piano
- Hugh Hopper – electric bass, clarinet
- Pierre Fenichel – double bass
- Stefano Tedesco – vibraphone
- Lenka Zupkova – violin

== Guest vocalists ==
While Strings of Consciousness is an instrumental band, various guest vocalists are used on their debut album Our Moon Is Full:

- J.G. Thirlwell (Foetus) – on Asphodel
- Scott McCloud (Girls Against Boys) – on Crystallize It
- Eugene Robinson (Oxbow) – on Cleanliness Is Next to Godliness
- Barry Adamson – on Sonic Glimpses
- Lisa Smith Klossner – on Defrost Oven
- Black Sifichi – on While the Sun Burns Out Another Sun and Midnight Moonbeams
- Pete Simonelli (Enablers) – on In Between
- Julie Christmas - on The Drone from Beyond Love

== Discography ==
=== Albums ===
- Kammerflimmer Kollektief / Strings of Consciousness (2007, Karl Records)
- Our Moon Is Full (2008, Central Control)
- Fantomastique Acoustica (2008, Off Label)
- Strings of Consciousness & Angel (2009, Important Records, Conspiracy Records)
- From Beyond Love (2012, Staubgold)

=== Remixes ===
- Tear It Down, (2007, Asthmatic Kitty Records)

=== Appears on ===
- Heart of the Sun (2008, Durtro, Jnana Records)

=== Tracks appear on ===
- Bip-Hop Generation Vol. 8 (2006, BiP_HOp)
- The Wire Tapper 18 (2007, Wire Magazine)
- Clinical Jazz (2008, Clinical Archives)
