= Ben Chatwin =

- Also known as: Talvihorros
- Born: Portsmouth, England
- Origin: South Queensferry, Scotland
- Genres: Electronic; noise; drone; ambient; experimental; glitch
- Years active: 2008–present
- Labels: Ba Da Bing Records; Denovali; Hibernate Records; Village Green Records; Benbecula Records
- Website: ben-chatwin.com

Ben Chatwin is an English musician who resides in Scotland. He previously performed under the name Talvihorros. He has released two albums, under his own name and five as Talvihorros. His most recent, Heat & Entropy (2016) appeared on Ba Da Bing Records while his previous outings appeared on Denovali and Hibernate Records. He has performed live globally. Besides his own work, Chatwin does bespoke music for adverts such as Calvin Klein, Louis Vuitton, Tate Modern and Volkswagen.

== Career ==
Chatwin was born in Portsmouth and began to explore music as a teenager. He moved to Brighton in his late teens to study Digital Music, while recording the self-released "It's Already on Fire" demo . Upon completion of his studies in 2004 he relocated to London. After playing in a number of bands, he began to use the name Talvihorros (meaning hibernation in Finnish) for his music in 2008. In 2009 the album Some Ambulance was released on Benbecula Records and featured Chris Howarth on bass. It was recorded in the winter of 2007–2008 using a modest budget in Hackney.

After signing with the German label Denovali, Chatwin released And It Was So in 2012 with the help of Christoph Berg (violin), Oliver Barrett (cello), Jordan Chatwin (percussion) and Anais Lalange (viola). The album used the Book of Genesis as inspiration, resulting in "a near-perfect and wholly unique album" according to brainwashed.com. In January 2014, Chatwin released the fifth and last album under the Talvihorros name. A collaboration with Daniel Crossley of Fluid Audio, Eaten Alive chronicles Crossley's drug addiction. It was described as "restrained" with "muted melancholia" in comparison with previous albums. During the summer of 2014, Chatwin performed at a number of festivals, including Incubate and the Denovali.

Towards the end of 2014, Chatwin moved to Edinburgh and began to record under his own name, noting that the "change coincided with a big life change in that I moved from London to Scotland". A year later, he released the album The Sleeper Awakes, inspired by the H. G Wells novel of the same name, on Village Green Recordings. It featured contributions by William Ryan Fritch (vocals, strings), Maarten Vos (cello), Joel Hanson (dulcimer) and Sarah Kemp (violin). It was described as "skilled at crafting a mood that continually evolves and shifts focus across the album's ten pieces".

Chatwin lives in South Queensferry. He works closely with his brother, London-based percussionist and graphic designer Jordan Chatwin. Together with his brother he was briefly a member of the rock band Inca Gold.

== Style ==
Chatwin's work is instrumental. He draws inspiration from the Radiohead release OK Computer, the work by Mogwai and electronica of Autechre. He uses unusual musical instruments such as a dulcitone and a 3-string diddley-bow. Other influences include Steve Reich.

== Discography ==
- The Hum (Village Green, 2020)
- Altered Signals (Village Green, 2019)
- Drone Signals (Village Green, 2018)
- Staccato Signals (Village Green, 2018)
- Heat & Entropy (Ba Da Bing!, 2016)
- The Sleeper Awakes (Village Green, 2015)

=== As Talvihorros ===
- Eaten Alive (2014)
- And It Was So (2012)
- Descent into Delta (2011)
- Music in Four Movements (2010)
- Some Ambulance (2009)

=== Split ===
- Monuments And Ruins (2012) with Damian Valles

=== Mix ===
- "Secret Thirteen Mix 016" on secretthirteen.org
