= Dawning (album) =

Studio album by Mouth of the Architect
- Released: 25 June 2013
- Recorded: November 2012 – February 2013
- Genre: Sludge metal, post-metal, post-rock
- Length: 53:20
- Label: Translation Loss
- Producer: Steve Brooks

Mouth of the Architect chronology
Quietly (2008)	Dawning (2013)	Path of Eight (2016)

Professional ratings
Review scores
Source	Rating
Pitchfork	(8.2/10)
Sputnikmusic	(4.5/5)
Blabbermouth	(7/10)

Dawning is the fourth studio album by the atmospheric sludge metal band Mouth of the Architect. Recorded at Steve Brooks' own Sound Architect Studio in Detroit, MI, it was released on Translation Loss Records on 25 June 2013. Kevin Schindels' guitar tracks recorded by John Lakes in Dayton, OH.

The album was released on digipack CD, limited edition 500 metallic gold double LP.

== Track listing ==
No.	Title	Length
1.	"Lullabye"	9:27
2.	"It Swarms"	8:37
3.	"Sharpen Your Axes"	6:55
4.	"How This Will End"	11:23
5.	"Patterns"	9:35
6.	"The Other Son"	7:19

== Personnel ==
- Steve Brooks – vocals, guitar, producer
- Kevin Schindel – vocals, guitar
- Jason Watkins - vocals, keyboards
- Dave Mann - drums
- Evan Danielson - bass
- Chris Fullam - painting
- Carson Slovak - layout
