= Coward (Made Out of Babies album) =

Studio album by Made Out of Babies
- Released: September 5, 2006
- Genre: Post-hardcore, sludge metal, noise rock
- Length: 37:25
- Label: Neurot
- Producer: Steve Albini

Made Out of Babies chronology
Trophy (2005)	Coward (2006)	The Ruiner (2008)

Professional ratings
Review scores
Source	Rating
AllMusic	3.5/5 stars
PopMatters	7/10 stars

Coward is the second studio album by American post-hardcore band Made Out of Babies, released on September 5, 2006. It was the second and last album by the band to be released through Neurot Recordings. The album was recorded and mixed by Steve Albini at Electrical Audio in Chicago with mixing by John Golden.

== Track listing ==
No.	Title	Length
1.	"Silverback"	3:33
2.	"Proud to Drown"	4:55
3.	"Fed"	4:32
4.	"Mandatory Bedrest"	4:50
5.	"Death in April"	4:34
6.	"Out"	4:49
7.	"Lullaby 03"	1:36
8.	"Mr. Prison Shanks"	3:39
9.	"Gunt"	4:58

== Personnel ==
Made Out of Babies

- Brendan Tobin – guitars
- Eric Cooper – bass
- Julie Christmas – vocals
- Matthew Egan – drums

Production

- Steve Albini – engineering, mixing
- John Golden – mastering
- Norbert Gariety – cover photo
