= The Ruiner =

Studio album by Made Out of Babies
- Released: June 24, 2008
- Genre: Noise rock, post-metal
- Length: 41:11
- Label: The End Records

Made Out of Babies chronology
Coward (2006)	The Ruiner (2008)

Professional ratings
Review scores
Source	Rating
AllMusic	4.5/5 stars
Blabbermouth.net	8/10
Just Press Play	9/10
Pitchfork	7.5/10

The Ruiner is the third and final studio album by American noise-rock/post-metal band Made Out of Babies. It was released through The End Records on June 24, 2008.

== Track listing ==
No.	Title	Length
1.	"Cooker"	5:51
2.	"Grimace"	3:45
3.	"Invisible Ink"	4:36
4.	"The Major"	5:31
5.	"Buffalo"	2:41
6.	"Bunny Boots"	4:15
7.	"Stranger"	7:07
8.	"Peew"	2:28
9.	"How to Get Bigger"	6:16
