= Birds of Passage (band) =

Birds of Passage is an ambient, minimalist experimental music solo project of the poet and singer-songwriter Alicia Merz Birds of Passage was formed in 2010 and is used as a monicker for the artist. Birds of Passage is signed to Denovali Records and went on tour throughout Europe, after the release of the debut album Without the World.

== Discography ==
Albums

- 2010: Garden of Secrets (Future Records)
- 2011: Without the World (Denovali Records)
- 2011: Dear and Unfamiliar (credited to Birds of Passage and Leonardo Rosado) (Denovali Records)
- 2012: Winter Lady (Denovali Records)
- 2013: Brother Sun, Sister Moon (with Gareth Munday) (Denovali Records)
- 2013: Taxidermy of Unicorns (co-release with Je Suis Le Petit Chevalier, Motion Sickness of Time Travel, and Aloonaluna) (Watery Starve Records)
- 2014: This Kindly Slumber (Denovali Records)
- 2018: The Death of Our Invention (Denovali Records)
- 2021: The Last Garden (Denovali Records)

EPs

- 2011: I Was All You Are (Heat Death Records & Cooper Cult Records)
- 2012: Highwaymen in Midnight Masks
