= Battle of Mice =

American post-metal supergroup band

- Origin: New York City, New York, United States
- Genres: Post-metal, sludge metal
- Years active: 2005–2009
- Label: Neurot
- Past members: Julie Christmas; Josh Graham; Tony Maimone; Joel Hamilton; Joe Tomino
- Website: www.battleofmice.com

Battle of Mice was an American post-metal supergroup consisting of Julie Christmas, Josh Graham, Joel Hamilton, Tony Maimone, and Joe Tomino. The band's name was derived from a saying by Alexander the Great pertaining to a military invasion of Crete.

The band was formed when vocalist Julie Christmas and guitarist/keyboardist Josh Graham met in Austin, Texas while touring with their respective bands in 2005.

Graham and Christmas were in an on-again-off-again relationship during the recording of the band's debut album, A Day of Nights. Released under Neurot Recordings, the album contains seven tracks heavily influenced by the metal, post-rock and noise rock roots from which the group was derived. The song "At the Base of the Giant's Throat" features a recorded 911 call between vocal sections.

In March 2008, Josh Graham revealed an interview that Battle of Mice was currently "on an indefinite hiatus". He also said that the band recorded two songs, about nine months after A Day of Nights was finished, for a split EP with Jesu on the Robotic Empire label. The EP was released on August 4, 2008.

On September 3, 2009, a blog was posted on the band's MySpace page stating that the band was parting ways.

== Members ==
- Julie Christmas (ex-Made Out of Babies) – vocals
- Josh Graham (ex-Neurosis, ex-Red Sparowes, A Storm of Light) – guitars, keyboards, and vocals
- Joel Hamilton (Book of Knots) – guitar
- Tony Maimone (Book of Knots, Pere Ubu) – bass
- Joe Tomino (Fugees, Dub Trio, Peeping Tom) – drums

== Discography ==
- Triad (split album) (2006)
- A Day of Nights (2006)
- Jesu / Battle of Mice (split EP) (2008)
