= Trophy (Made Out of Babies album) =

Studio album by Made Out of Babies
- Released: June 28, 2005
- Genres: Sludge metal; noise rock; art rock
- Length: 38:02
- Label: Neurot Recordings
- Producer: Joel Hamilton

Made Out of Babies chronology
Trophy (2005)	Coward (2006)

Professional ratings
Review scores
Source	Rating
AllMusic	4/5 stars
Exclaim!	(favorable)

Trophy is the debut album by American noise-rock/post-metal band Made Out of Babies. It was released through Neurot Recordings on June 28, 2005. The album was produced, engineered, and mixed by Joel Hamilton at Atomic Recordings in Brooklyn and Leopard Studios in New Paltz with mastering by Doug Henderson.

== Track listing ==
No.	Title	Length
1.	"Herculoid"	3:47
2.	"Loosey Goosey"	3:16
3.	"El Morgan"	5:58
4.	"Ire Fire"	3:19
5.	"Lullaby No. 1"	1:07
6.	"Gut Shoveler"	4:40
7.	"Sugar"	3:49
8.	"Lullaby No. 2"	0:52
9.	"Swarm"	3:17
10.	"Pirate"	3:15
11.	"Wounded Rhino"	4:01
12.	"Out..."	0:41

== Personnel ==
Made Out of Babies

- Matthew Egan – drums
- Brendan "Bunny" Tobin – guitar
- Julie Christmas – vocals
- Eric Cooper – bass guitar
- Viva Stowell – bass guitar (tracks 2, 6 and 7)

Production

- Joel Hamilton – engineering, producer, mixing
- Doug Henderson – mastering
