= The Mount Fuji Doomjazz Corporation =

Dutch musical group

- Also known as: TMFDJC, TMFDC
- Origin: Utrecht, Netherlands
- Genres: Dark ambient, avant-garde, electronic
- Years active: 2007–2013, 2025–present
- Labels: Ad Noiseam, Denovali, Roadburn
- Spinoff of: The Kilimanjaro Darkjazz Ensemble
- Members: Jason Köhnen; Gideon Kiers; Eelco Bosman; Hilary Jeffery; Charlotte Cegarra
- Past members: Sarah Anderson; Nina Hitz; Ron Goris; Bruce Coates; Godfried Satan
- Website: tkde.net

The Mount Fuji Doomjazz Corporation is a side project of the members of The Kilimanjaro Darkjazz Ensemble founded in Utrecht in 2007.

== History ==
The idea for this project was born when the musicians of The Kilimanjaro Darkjazz Ensemble wanted to dedicate themselves completely to improvised music with a side project. Initially, there was no intention to release any records. However, early performances of the group were already documented, so that a performance on February 24, 2007 at the Amsterdam Overtoom 301 in June of the same year was released as the first album Doomjazz Future Corpses! via Ad Noiseam.

In the following years the group performed internationally and documented various performances as further publications in different formations. Jason Köhnen and Gideon Kiers appeared as the smallest unit, and, in addition to the musicians of The Kilimanjaro Darkjazz Ensemble, other guest musicians were added to performances. The loose collectivist form of the group influenced the music in each new line-up as much as the locations, the audience and the personal mood of the musicians.

The project disbanded in late 2013.

On January 22, 2025 via his email newsletter Jason Köhnen announced that both The Kilimanjaro Darkjazz Ensemble and The Mount Fuji Doomjazz Corporation are back: "After a hiatus of 12 years... I can proudly say that TKDE (and TMFDJC) are back together again... Stay tuned for upcoming news!" On February 12, 2025 it was officially announced that The Kilimanjaro Darkjazz Ensemble and The Mount Fuji Doomjazz Corporation will perform once again in their original line-up on August 29 2025 at Lido in Berlin, Germany. After the sold out announce on April 29, 2025 new additional show was announced: an end-of-residency concert of The Mount Fuji Doomjazz Corporation at DBs, Utrecht, The Netherlands on August 9, 2025, with Organza Ray, the project of trombonist Hilary Jeffrey & Eleni Poulou, as a special guest.

== Members ==
=== Current lineup ===
- Jason Köhnen – bass, FX (2007–2013, 2025–present)
- Eelco Bosman – guitar (2007–2013, 2025–present)
- Hilary Jeffery – trombone, oscillator (2007–2013, 2025–present)
- Gideon Kiers – drums (2008–2010), electronics, production (2010–2013, 2025–present)
- Charlotte Cegarra – vocals (2008–2013, 2025–present), electronics, FX (2025–present)

=== Former members ===
- Ron Goris – sound (2007), drums (2010–2011)
- Godfried Satan – vocals (2007)
- Bruce Coates – saxophone (2007)
- Sarah "Sadie" Anderson – violin (2008–2011)
- Nina Hitz – cello (2009–2011, 2012–2013)

== Discography ==
Live albums

- 2007 – Doomjazz Future Corpses! (Ad Noiseam, reissued by Denovali Records)
- 2009 – Succubus (Ad Noiseam, reissued by Denovali Records)
- 2011 – Anthropomorphic (Denovali Records, Parallel Corners)
- 2012 – Егор (Egor) (Denovali Records)
- 2013 – Live at Roadburn (Roadburn Records)

In 2017 Denovali Records started re-releasing the complete back catalogue of the band.
