= The Book of Knots =

American experimental art rock band

- Origin: Brooklyn, New York City, United States
- Genres: Experimental rock, art rock
- Years active: 2003–present
- Labels: ANTI- Records, Arclight Records, Ipecac Recordings
- Members: Tony Maimone; Joel Hamilton; Carla Kihlstedt; Matthias Bossi
- Website: thebookofknots.com

The Book of Knots is an American experimental art rock band consisting of the members Matthias Bossi, Joel Hamilton, Carla Kihlstedt and Tony Maimone.

== History ==
The Book of Knots was formed in 2003 by three core band members Joel Hamilton, Matthias Bossi and Tony Maimone at Hamilton and Maimone’s Brooklyn–based Studio G. Members of Book of Knots have played or worked with various acts previously, including Skeleton Key, Sleepytime Gorilla Museum, Shiner, Battle of Mice, Sparklehorse, Elvis Costello, Unsane, Pere Ubu, Frank Black, They Might Be Giants, and more. Carla Kihlstedt (of Tin Hat Trio, Sleepytime Gorilla Museum, and 2 Foot Yard, among others) joined later in 2003 to solidify what would become the group's core quartet.

Together, the Book of Knots decided to release three conceptual records: their first was an ode to rotting seaside towns — a self-titled debut which appeared on Arclight Records in 2004. The second was a tribute to the American rust belt, titled Traineater; the group had signed to Anti- in November 2006, and the album's release followed in April 2007. It featured guest performances from musicians such as Tom Waits, Mike Watt, Jon Langford and David Thomas. The third album, with an aeronautical theme, was named Garden of Fainting Stars; the title track was written and performed by Elyas Khan of Nervous Cabaret. It was released on Ipecac Recordings June 14, 2011 and featured Mike Patton, Blixa Bargeld and more.

== Discography ==
- Book of Knots (Arclight Records, 2004)
- Traineater (ANTI-, 2007)
- Garden of Fainting Stars (Ipecac Recordings, June 14, 2011)
