= Made Out of Babies =

American sludge metal band

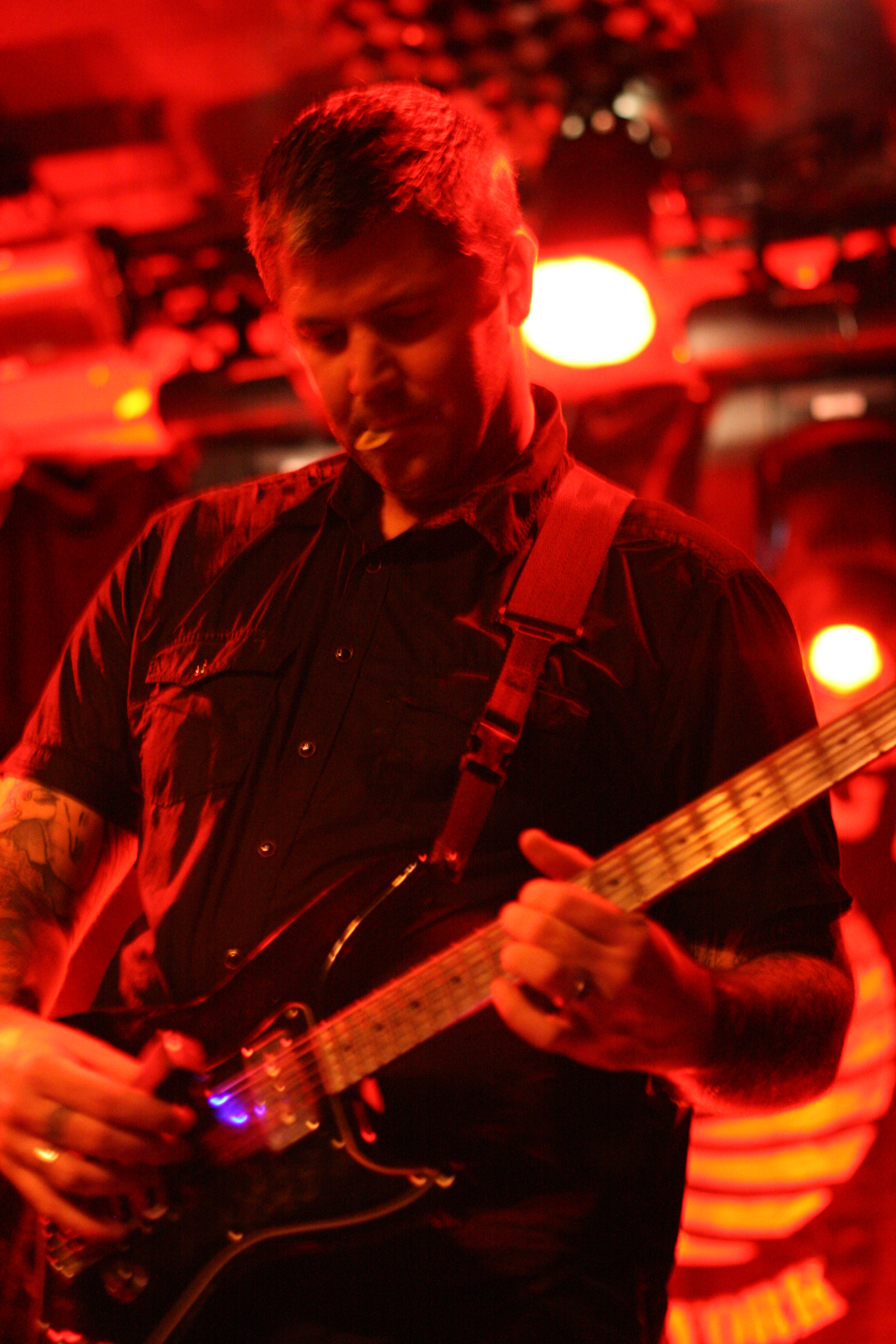
- Made Out of Babies at a Brooklyn Vegan party, 2008

Background information
- Origin: Brooklyn, New York, United States
- Genres: Noise rock, sludge metal, post-metal, post-hardcore
- Years active: 2004-2012
- Labels: Neurot Recordings
- Members: Matthew Egan; Brendan "Bunny" Tobin; Julie Christmas; Eric Cooper

Made Out of Babies was a sludge metal band from Brooklyn, New York formed in 2004 that disbanded in 2012.

== Biography ==
Drawing equally from noise rock bands such as The Jesus Lizard and post-metal bands such as Isis, the band developed a following after the release of their debut album, Trophy. Their first two albums were released by Neurot Recordings, the label of post-metal and post-rock bands like Isis, Neurosis, and Red Sparowes. Made Out of Babies were signed to The End Records for the release of their 2008 album The Ruiner. On March 13, 2012, lead singer Julie Christmas posted on her Facebook page that the band was no longer together. On September 18, 2012, the new band Bad Powers - featuring Tobin, Cooper, and Egan with new singer Megan Tweed - released its debut album on The End Records.

== Members ==
- Matthew Egan (Cleanteeth) – drums
- Brendan "Bunny" Tobin (Red Sparowes) – guitar
- Julie Christmas (Battle of Mice) – vocals
- Eric Cooper (Strangelight, Pushmen, Bad Powers, Kiss It Goodbye, J.J. Paradise Players Club, Pigs.) – bass guitar

== Discography ==
=== Albums ===
- Trophy (2005, Neurot Recordings)
- Coward (2006, Neurot Recordings)
- The Ruiner (2008, The End Records)

=== EPs ===
- Triad (split with Red Sparowes and Battle of Mice) (2006, Neurot Recordings)

=== Compilations ===
- We Reach: The Music of the Melvins (a 2005 tribute album to the Melvins, Fractured Transmitter Recording Company)
- NYC Sucks, Volume 1 (2010 compilation of bands from the New York metal scene by MetalSucks.net. The compilation featured "Invisible Ink")
- Monster CD No 13

=== References ===
- New Album Release Date
- Live performance at Union Hall in Brooklyn
