= Live in Stuttgart (One-Off Shit Let's Go!) =

Live In Stuttgart (One-Off Shit Let's Go!)

Live album by Atari Teenage Riot
- Released: 1996
- Recorded: Live in Stuttgart, Germany 1996
- Genre: Noise music
- Label: Digital Hardcore Recordings
- Producer: Alec Empire

Atari Teenage Riot chronology
Delete Yourself! (1994)	Live In Stuttgart (One-Off Shit Let's Go!) (1996)	The Future Of War (1997)

Back cover
- Cover art on the back of the cassette featuring a picture of Hanin Elias and Gina V. D'Orio on guitars, Roland Braun on drums and Carl Crack on Microphone

Live In Stuttgart (One-Off Shit Let's Go!) is a rare live album by Atari Teenage Riot. Initially released on cassette, the album documents the Stuttgart performance referred to as an infamous Live at Brixton Academy noise-fest, and features a blend of live instrumentation and spoken word segments.

In addition to ATR members Alec Empire, Carl Crack, and Hanin Elias, the performance featured fellow DHR act EC8OR (Gina V. D'Orio on guitar and Roland Braun on drums).

== Track listing ==
1. (Untitled)
2. (Untitled)
