= Revolution Action =

Revolution Action E.P.

EP by Atari Teenage Riot
- Released: 28 December 1999
- Genres: Digital hardcore, punk rock, noise
- Length: 17:29
- Label: Digital Hardcore Recordings
- Producer: Alec Empire

Atari Teenage Riot chronology
Too Dead for Me E.P. (1999)	Revolution Action E.P. (1999)	Rage E.P. (2000)

Professional ratings
Review scores
Source	Rating
Allmusic	2/5 stars

Revolution Action E.P. is an extended play by the German digital hardcore group Atari Teenage Riot, released in 1999 on 12" vinyl and CD formats to promote the album 60 Second Wipe Out, where the title track originates. Two music videos were produced for the track, one of which was actually banned by MTV. "Revolution Action" was also the name of a tour and live various artist release titled Revolution Action Japan Tour 1999 EP.

The title track was also released on a three track Atari Teenage Riot promo, and a live version of the song was included on the Too Dead For Me EP and later re-released on Redefine the Enemy - Rarities and B-Side Compilation 1992-1999. In 2006 the song was released on the compilation Atari Teenage Riot: 1992-2000. The song was included on the various artist compilation ¥999 DHR Sampler.

== Music video ==
Two promotional music video VHSs were released as well to promote the song, each containing a different version of a music video. In addition, the music video was released on the VHS music video compilation Digital Hardcore Videos. One of the videos was a collection of live footage of the band spliced with the song, while the other showcased an office filled with workers being transformed into a faceless, insane violence mob that attacks each other while the band tortures, on video sent to the office manager, a random faceless office worker. In the end, the office workers manifest the TV monitor screens similar to the Teletubbies on their stomachs and are sent to be "reeducated" by their employer. This video aired on MTV for several months before being pulled due to concerns over the violence featured in it.

== Track listing ==
No.	Title	Length
1.	"Revolution Action"	3:43
2.	"No Success" (Digital Hardcore Remix)	4:22
3.	"Your Uniform (Does Not Impress Me)" (Digital Hardcore Edit)	5:32
4.	"Hunt Down The Nazis" (Live In Washington, DC 1997)	3:48

== Personnel ==
- Alec Empire – production, writing, performance
- Carl Crack – performance
- Hanin Elias – writing, performance
- Nic Endo – performance
- Steve Rooke – mastering
- Andy Wallace – mixing on "Revolution Action"
- Dave Sardy – mixing on "No Success (Digital Hardcore Remix)"
