= Rage E.P. =

EP by Atari Teenage Riot
- Released: 31 October 2000
- Genre: Digital hardcore
- Length: 14:48
- Label: Digital Hardcore Recordings
- Producer: Alec Empire

Atari Teenage Riot chronology
Revolution Action E.P. (1999)	Rage E.P. (2000)	Redefine the Enemy - Rarities and B-Side Compilation 1992-1999 (2002)

Professional ratings
Review scores
Source	Rating
Allmusic	1.5/5 stars

Rage E.P. is a release by Atari Teenage Riot. Although the title of the release is "Rage E.P.", it only contains versions of the song "Rage", so it is similar to a single. The CD versions are enhanced CDs which contain the single file of the music video "Too Dead For Me" in MPEG format. A 12" vinyl edition also exists.

The song "Rage" was later released on the compilation Atari Teenage Riot: 1992-2000. The song was also released on the various artist compilations Clear And Present Danger Vol. 1 and DHR LTD12 CD.

== Track listing ==
No.	Title	Length
1.	"Rage" (featuring Tom Morello)	3:56
2.	"Rage" (Remix featuring MC D-Stroy)	6:57
3.	"Too Dead for Me"	3:55
Total length:		14:48

== Personnel ==
- Alec Empire – production, performance
- Carl Crack – performance
- Nic Endo – performance
- Hanin Elias – performance
- Tom Morello – guitar on "Rage"
- MC D-Story – vocals on "Rage (Remix)"
- Steve Rooke – mastering
