= Burn, Berlin, Burn! =

Compilation album by Atari Teenage Riot
- Released: April 22, 1997; 2003 (DHR reissue)
- Recorded: 1993–1997
- Genres: Digital hardcore, hardcore techno, noise, hardcore punk
- Length: 50:19
- Labels: Grand Royal (United States); Digital Hardcore (UK)
- Producer: Alec Empire

Atari Teenage Riot chronology
The Future of War (1997)	Burn, Berlin, Burn! (1997)	60 Second Wipeout (1999)

Professional ratings
Review scores
Source	Rating
AllMusic	4/5 stars
Pitchfork	8.1/10
Rolling Stone	3/5 stars

Burn, Berlin, Burn! is a compilation album released by Atari Teenage Riot in 1997. Initially released in the United States by the Beastie Boys' record label Grand Royal (Mike D was quoted saying the music is "the most punk-rock shit ever"), the album is a collection of tracks from their first two albums Delete Yourself! and The Future of War. After Grand Royal Records went defunct, the album was later remastered and re-released on Digital Hardcore Recordings.

== Track listing ==
All tracks by Alec Empire

1. "Start the Riot" – 3:38
2. "Fuck All!" – 3:08
3. "Sick to Death" – 3:40
4. "P.R.E.S.S." – 4:19
5. "Deutschland (Has Gotta Die!)" – 3:02
6. "Destroy 2000 Years of Culture" – 3:51
7. "Not Your Business" – 2:32
8. "Heatwave" – 2:43
9. "Atari Teenage Riot" – 3:35
10. "Delete Yourself" – 4:30
11. "Into the Death" – 3:26
12. "Death Star" – 5:23
13. "Speed" – 2:48
14. "The Future of War" – 3:44

Tracks 1, 9, 10, 11, 13 from Delete Yourself!. Tracks 2–8, 12, 14 from The Future of War.

== Personnel ==
- Alec Empire – Producer
- Philipp Virus – Animation
