= Is This Hyperreal? =

2011 studio album by Atari Teenage Riot

Studio album by Atari Teenage Riot
- Released: 7 June 2011
- Recorded: The Hellish Vortex
- Genre: Digital hardcore, noise, electronic
- Length: 43:30
- Label: Digital Hardcore, Dim Mak
- Producer: Alec Empire

Atari Teenage Riot chronology
Atari Teenage Riot: 1992–2000 (2006)	Is This Hyperreal? (2011)	Reset (2014)

Is This Hyperreal? is the fourth studio album from Atari Teenage Riot, and their first album since they effectively disbanded in 2000. It is the first ATR album featuring CX KiDTRONiK, and the first album without former vocalists Hanin Elias and the late Carl Crack.

== Track listing ==
No.	Title	Length
1.	"Activate!"	3:36
2.	"Blood in My Eyes"	3:47
3.	"Black Flags"	4:00
4.	"Is This Hyperreal?"	4:12
5.	"Codebreaker" (feat. Steve Aoki)	5:16
6.	"Shadow Identity"	4:12
7.	"Re-Arrange Your Synapses"	3:14
8.	"Digital Decay"	4:23
9.	"The Only Slight Glimmer of Hope"	3:53
10.	"Collapse of History"	6:57

=== Notes ===
- The single version of "Black Flags" features vocals from Boots Riley.

== Reception ==
Professional ratings
Aggregate scores
Source	Rating
Metacritic	65/100
Review scores
Source	Rating
AllMusic	3.5/5 stars
Beats Per Minute	60%
Consequence of Sound	F
Drowned in Sound	8/10
Pitchfork	5.1/10
PopMatters	5/10 stars
Tiny Mix Tapes	3/5 stars

The album received mixed to positive reviews from critics. Metacritic assigned it an average score of 65 out of 100, based on 13 reviews.
