= Too Dead for Me =

Too Dead For Me EP

EP by Atari Teenage Riot
- Released: 1 October 1999
- Genre: Digital hardcore, punk rock, noise
- Length: 19:10
- Label: Digital Hardcore Recordings
- Producer: Alec Empire

Atari Teenage Riot chronology
60 Second Wipe Out (1999)	Too Dead For Me EP (1999)	Revolution Action E.P. (1999)

Too Dead For Me EP is an EP by Atari Teenage Riot released in 1999 on CD and as a 12" vinyl record to promote their album 60 Second Wipe Out, where the title track originated.

"Revolution Action (Live In San Francisco)/[Noise#3]" and "No Remorse [Live In New York 1999]/[Noise #1]" were both re-released on Redefine the Enemy - Rarities and B-Side Compilation 1992-1999, in their entirety but the titles were truncated, removing the words "[Noise #3]" and "[Noise #1]". "Death Of A President DIY [Acapella]" was also re-released on Redefine the Enemy - Rarities and B-Side Compilation 1992-1999.

== Track listing ==
No.	Title	Length
1.	"Too Dead for Me/[noise #2]"	4:23
2.	"Revolution Action/[noise #3]" (Live in San Francisco 1999)	4:45
3.	"Anarchy 999" (Real Mix)	4:01
4.	"Death of a President" (Accapella)	0:28
5.	"No Remorse/[noise #1]" (Live in New York 1999)	5:33
Total length:		19:10

== Personnel ==
- Alec Empire – production, performance
- Hanin Elias – performance
- Nic Endo – performance
- Carl Crack – performance
- Steve Rooke – mastering
