= Christoph de Babalon =

German musician, artist and DJ

- Born: Jan-Christoph Walter
- Origin: Hamburg, Germany
- Genres: Breakcore; digital hardcore; dark ambient; drum and bass; jungle; experimental
- Occupations: DJ; producer
- Instruments: Computer; synthesizer; sampler
- Years active: 1994–present
- Labels: Cross Fade Enter Tainment, Digital Hardcore Records, TigerBeat6, Love Love Records, VIS

Christoph de Babalon is a German electronic producer, experimental artist and DJ, best known for his work on Alec Empire's label Digital Hardcore Recordings, most notably If You're Into It, I'm Out of It (1997). He also is the co-founder of the label Cross Fade Enter Tainment (CFET).

== Biography ==
Christoph de Babalon was born in Hamburg, Germany and stayed there for most of his life until 1999 when he moved to Berlin. After releasing a few recordings on smaller record labels in Germany and his own Cross Fade Entertainment Imprint, and being heralded as a favorite on John Peel's radio show in 1994, de Babalon signed to DHR in 1996, releasing a few EPs and later releasing his only full-length album for the label, If You're Into It, I'm Out of It in 1997. De Babalon was signed after he befriended label operator Alec Empire at a rave in 1994.

The album was well received and gained mostly positive reviews, with Radiohead frontman Thom Yorke describing it as "the most menacing record [he] owns", but in sound was different to other DHR releases, offering a new vision of electronic music that varied greatly from that of artists such as Atari Teenage Riot and EC8OR, who used industrial sounds with hardcore punk and gabber influences. With the release of If You're Into It, I'm Out of It, de Babalon solidified his signature sound as a combination of extreme complexity in construction and complete experimentation in form. Songs span many electronic genres including noise, soundscapes, dark ambient, drum and bass and breakcore. Some of his tracks are also known for their length, with "Opium" lasting over 15 minutes long and "High Life (Theme)" lasting over 11.

After the release of If You're Into It, I'm Out of It, de Babalon amicably left Digital Hardcore Records and made a few small releases through a variety of labels before withdrawing from the public eye to work on other projects, including composing for theater. One of his last few releases before his hiatus from production was a split 12-inch with Miguel Trost De Pedro (better known by his stage name Kid606), with whom he became friends and would later release music through Miguel's label TigerBeat6. In 2001, before his hiatus, de Babalon opened for Radiohead during their Amnesiac tour. For a short period of time during the mid-2000s, he produced music with fellow producer Christian Haudej under the name Übergang. They released a CDEP and a 12-inch before playing their final announced show in 2007. Christoph would not return to releasing music under his own name again until 2008 with Scylla & Charybdis, a limited edition conceptual 12-inch about Greek mythology. He revived his Cross Fade Enter Tainment imprint, which had been defunct since 2003, to release it.

Since 2008, de Babalon has been releasing music more often, even reissuing rare unreleased tracks as a compilation via his own bandcamp page titled The Haunting Past of Christoph de Babalon, Vol. 1 in 2014. He issued his long-awaited follow up studio album to If You're Into It, I'm Out of It, titled A Bond With Sorrow, digitally through Kid606's TigerBeat6 imprint in 2012. His fourth full-length album, Short Eternities, was issued in 2015 through Love Love Records.

== Discography ==
=== Studio albums ===
- File Already Exists. Continue (Y/N)? (1995, CFET)
- If You're Into It, I'm Out of It (1997, Digital Hardcore Recordings)
- A Bond With Sorrow (2012, TigerBeat6)
- Short Eternities (2015, Love Love Records)
- Exquisite Angst (2018, A Colourful Storm)
- Recurring Horrors (2020, A Colourful Storm)
- Vale (2023)

=== Singles and EPs ===
- Love Under Will 12-inch (1994, Fischkopf Hamburg)
- Destroy Berlin! 12-inch (1996, Digital Hardcore Recordings)
- Seven Up 12-inch/CDep (1997, Digital Hardcore Recordings)
- In A Bad Mood 12-inch (1998, Ghetto Safari)
- Rise Above This 7-inch (2000, Zhark International)
- Dark Background (2000, Falsch)
- Scylla & Charybdis 12-inch (2008, CFET)
- A World of My Own 12-inch (2010, Restroom Records)
- Traumspiel (2012, TigerBeat6)
- Grim Zenith 12-inch (2017, VIS)
- Harakiri (2018, ALTER)
- Hectic Shakes 12-inch (2019, ALTER)
- Where Are You Going? (2020, Sneaker Social Club)
- Ether (2021)
- 044 (Hilf Der Selbst!) (2021, AD 93)
- Leaving Time (2023, Super Hexagon Records)
- Ach, Mensch 12-inch (2024, Midnight Shift)

=== Split and collaborative releases ===
- We Declare War! split 12-inch with Paul Snowden (1995, CFET)
- Tocotronic/Christoph de Babalon split 7-inch (1997, L'Âge d'or)
- FatCat Split Series #10 split 12-inch with Kid606 (2000, FatCat Records)
- Mean Grey Value 3.5" floppy disc with M. Dinig (2002, 89 mm)
- Invocation of the Demon Twin Vol. 1 split 12-inch with Triames (2015, Giallo Disco)
- VISC 01 split cassette with Nina (2016, VIS)
- Cera Khin/Christoph de Babalon split cassette (2018, LazyTapes)
- Teyas with WIDT (2018, Bocian Records)
- Split with Mark (2020, A Colorful Storm)

=== Live albums ===
- Live at Dance Affliction (2017, Dance Affliction)

=== Compilation albums ===
- The Haunting Past of Christoph de Babalon, Vol. I (2014, CFET)
- The Haunting Past of Christoph de Babalon, Vol. II (2017, CFET)
- The Haunting Past of Christoph de Babalon, Vol. III (2017, CFET)
