= Atari Teenage Riot: 1992–2000 =

Greatest hits album by Atari Teenage Riot
- Released: 3 July 2006
- Genre: Digital hardcore
- Length: 62:57
- Label: Digital Hardcore Recordings
- Producer: Steve Rooke

Atari Teenage Riot chronology
Redefine the Enemy (2002)	Atari Teenage Riot: 1992–2000 (2006)	Is This Hyperreal? (2011)

Professional ratings
Review scores
Source	Rating
AllMusic	4/5 stars

Atari Teenage Riot: 1992–2000 is a greatest hits compilation by the seminal digital hardcore band Atari Teenage Riot. The album was released on band member Alec Empire's Digital Hardcore Recordings on 3 July 2006 and features 18 tracks from the band's back catalogue.

== Track listing ==
1. "Speed" (from Delete Yourself!)
2. "Destroy 2000 Years of Culture" (from The Future of War)
3. "Revolution Action" (from 60 Second Wipeout)
4. "Deutschland (Has Gotta Die!)" (from Redefine the Enemy)
5. "Rage" (from the Rage E.P.)
6. "Into the Death" (from Delete Yourself!)
7. "Riot 1995" (from Delete Yourself!)
8. "Midijunkies" (from Delete Yourself!)
9. "Start the Riot" (from Delete Yourself!)
10. "Too Dead for Me" (from 60 Second Wipeout)
11. "Atari Teenage Riot" (from Delete Yourself!)
12. "Get Up While You Can" (from The Future of War)
13. "You Can't Hold Us Back" (from The Future of War)
14. "Delete Yourself! (You Got No Chance to Win!)" (from Delete Yourself!)
15. "Sick to Death" (from The Future of War)
16. "Western Decay" (from 60 Second Wipeout)
17. "Kids Are United!" (from Delete Yourself!)
18. "Hetzjagd Auf Nazis!" (from the SuEcide Pt.2 EP by Alec Empire)

=== Notes ===
- "Any Means Necessary" is included as an extra track - the song plays at the end of "Revolution Action".
- The version of "Deutschland Has Gotta Die!" that appears on this album is the remixed version that appeared on Redefine the Enemy - Rarities and B-Side Compilation 1992-1999.
- Vocal of "Rage" is Alec Empire. This version is not included "Rage E.P.".
- Whereas a live version of "Hetzjagd Auf Nazis" is used on Delete Yourself, the version included here is the track originally recorded by Alec Empire and released on his SuEcide Pt.2 EP.
- The front cover of the album features a Roland TR-909 drum machine, an instrument prominent throughout Atari Teenage Riot recordings.
