= Reset (Atari Teenage Riot album) =

Studio album by Atari Teenage Riot
- Released: 26 March 2014
- Studio: The Hellish Vortex Studios (Berlin, Germany)
- Genre: Digital hardcore; noise; electronic
- Length: 42:55
- Label: Beat; Digital Hardcore
- Producer: Alec Empire; Nic Endo

Atari Teenage Riot chronology
| Is This Hyperreal? (2011) | Reset (2014) |

Professional ratings
Aggregate scores
| Source | Rating |
|---|---|
| Metacritic | 75/100 |
Review scores
| Source | Rating |
| DIY | 3/5 stars |
| Kerrang! | 4/5 |
| Metal Hammer | 3.5/5 stars |
| musicOMH | 4.5/5 stars |
| NME | 8/10 |
| The Line of Best Fit | 7/10 |

Reset is the fifth studio album by German digital hardcore band Atari Teenage Riot. It was released on 26 March 2014 in Japan via Beat Records and on 9 February 2015 worldwide via Digital Hardcore Recordings. Recorded at The Hellish Vortex Studios in Berlin, it was produced by members Alec Empire and Nic Endo.

== Track listing ==
All music is composed by Alexander Wilke-Steinhof and Nic Endo.

| No. | Title | Length |
|---|---|---|
| 1. | "J1M1" | 3:15 |
| 2. | "Street Grime" | 3:12 |
| 3. | "Reset" | 4:28 |
| 4. | "Death Machine" | 3:55 |
| 5. | "Modern Liars" | 4:03 |
| 6. | "Cra$h" | 3:43 |
| 7. | "New Blood" | 3:51 |
| 8. | "Transducer" | 5:21 |
| 9. | "Erase Your Face" | 6:15 |
| 10. | "We Are From the Internet" | 4:52 |
