= Cobra Killer =

German digital hardcore group

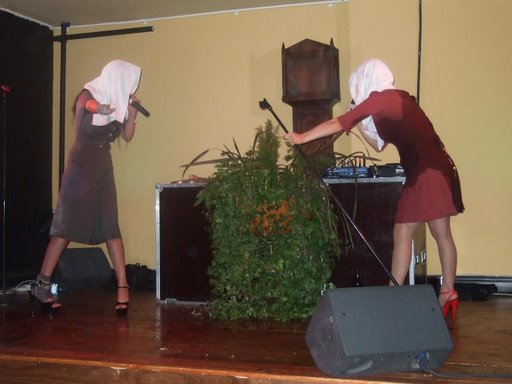
- Annika Line Trost (left) and Gina V. D'Orio (right) performing at the Crane Lane Theatre in Cork City, 2008

Background information
- Origin: Germany
- Genres: Digital hardcore Electroclash
- Labels: Digital Hardcore Recordings; Monika Enterprise
- Members: Gina V. D'Orio; Annika Trost
- Website: www.cobra-killer.org

The Cobra Killer duo of Gina V. D'Orio and Annika Trost began as part of Alec Empire's Digital hardcore movement. Both were part of other bands signed to Empire's Digital Hardcore Recordings label—D'Orio was in EC8OR, and Trost was in Shizuo.

When Empire's label cut back on its bands, many of the DHR groups folded, but D'Orio and Trost kept going. They have released four albums and are currently on the Monika Enterprise label. Cobra Killer played with Sonic Youth and collaborates with many international artists. Peaches played her first gig as support act of Cobra Killer in Berlin.

== Discography ==
=== Albums ===
- Cobra Killer (1998)
- The Third Armpit (2002)
- 76/77 (2004)
- Das Mandolinenorchester (2005)
- Uppers & Downers (2009)

=== Singles ===
- "Right Into A Kick For More" (7") (1998)
- "Heavy Rotation" (10") (2002)
- "Heavy Rotation" (The Grossraumdiskomixes) (12") (2005)
- "Das Mandolinenorchester" (2005)
