= Yamaha A3000 =

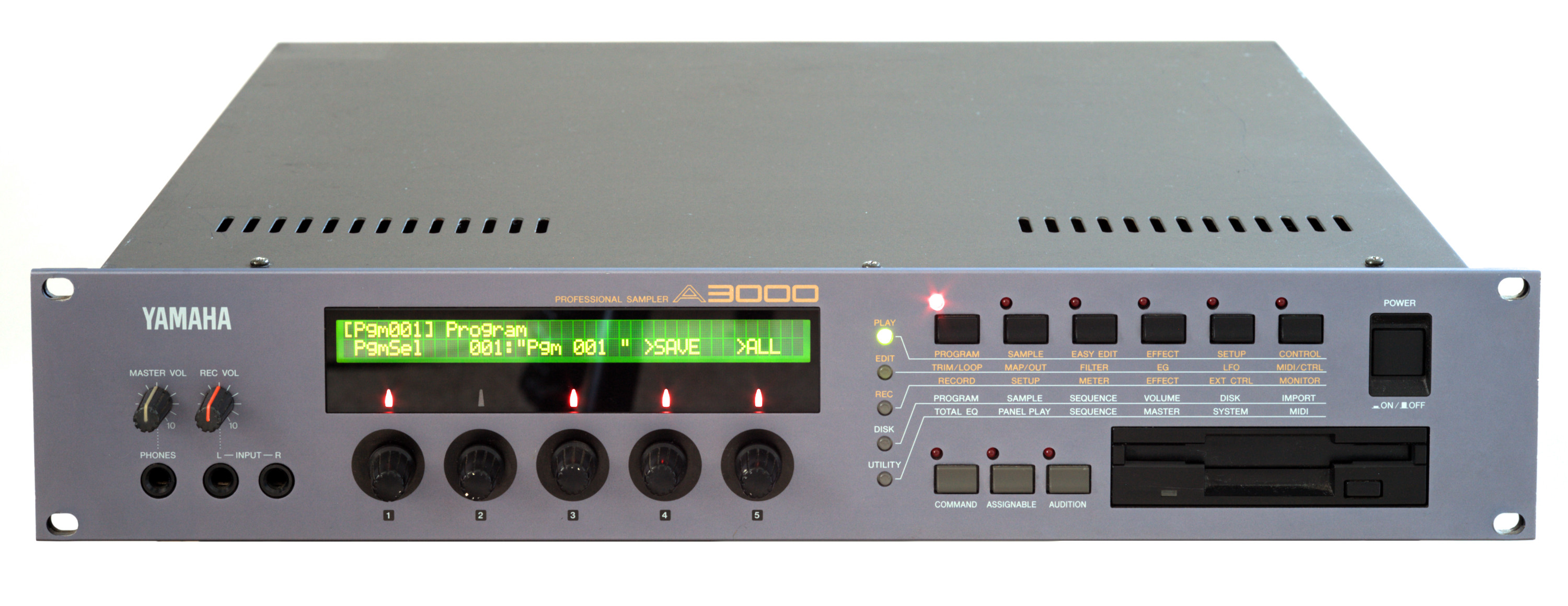
- Yamaha A3000
- Manufacturer: Yamaha
- Dates: 1997
- Price: ¥179,000

Technical specifications
- Polyphony: 64
- Timbrality: 16
- Oscillator: AWM2
- Synthesis type: Digital Sample-based Subtractive
- Filter: Digital filter
- Storage memory: 2MB (up to 128MB) RAM; 1.44 MB HD 3.5" floppy disk
- Effects: Internal

Input/output
- External control: MIDI

The Yamaha A3000 is a rackmount sampler released by Yamaha in 1997. It succeeded the Yamaha TX16W, which had been released in 1988.

== Background ==
The A3000 is a 16-bit stereo sampler that can record at 5 kHz, 11 kHz, 22 kHz, or 44.1 kHz. An optional expansion board, the AIEB1, included digital S/PDIF inputs that could sample at 32 kHz, 44.1 kHz, or 48 kHz, plus three pairs of assignable analogue 1/4" output jacks. The sampling engine included digital low-pass, high-pass, band-pass, and notch filters. Storage was via a 1.44MB HD 3.5" floppy disk drive, or an optional internal SCSI hard drive. The A3000 came with 2MB of RAM built into the motherboard. The internal memory could be expanded in pairs to 128MB with 72-pin SIMMS.

In addition to its sampling functionality the A3000 also included an AWM2 tone generator, and a three-channel multi-effects unit. The effects could be programmed to bypass the sample engine, allowing for the A3000 to be used as a standalone effects unit. The standard A3000 could import samples created by Akai and E-mu samplers, and also wav and aiff files. It was also supported by Tiny Wave Editor, an application for the IBM PC and Apple Macintosh, released by Yamaha, that could import and export samples to the machine via SCSI.

The original operating system attracted criticism for its usability. In 1998 Yamaha released an EPROM upgrade kit that improved the user interface and added new functionality, including the ability to import samples from Roland samplers. Upgraded A3000 samplers were sold as the Yamaha A3000 v2.

The A3000 was superseded by the Yamaha A4000 and Yamaha A5000, released in 2000.

== Notable uses ==
- Atari Teenage Riot - Live at Brixton Academy
- Daedelus
