= Speed/Midijunkies =

"Speed/Midijunkies & Midijunkies/Speed"

Single by Atari Teenage Riot

from the album Delete Yourself!
- A-side: "Speed"/"Midijunkies"
- B-side: "Start The Riot!" (Live)
- Released: April 1995
- Recorded: January 1, 1995
- Genre: Digital hardcore, hardcore techno
- Length: 2:50 ("Speed"); 4:50 ("Midijunkies")
- Label: Digital Hardcore Recordings, Alternation
- Songwriter: Alec Empire
- Producer: Alec Empire

Atari Teenage Riot singles chronology
"Kids Are United!'" (1993)	"Speed/Midijunkies & Midijunkies/Speed" (1995)	"Not Your Business" (1996)

"Speed/Midijunkies" (according to the CD single) or Midijunkies/Speed (according to the 12" vinyl) is a single by Atari Teenage Riot, initially released in April 1995 to promote their debut full-length Delete Yourself!. The song "Speed" samples Powermad's "Slaughterhouse" and was later used for the 2006 movie The Fast and the Furious: Tokyo Drift.

The track "Midijunkies" was previously used in the band's debut 1993 single "ATR". Let it be noted that the track list for the CD version of the single places "Speed" in front of "Midijunkies", while the 12" edition has that reversed. The single also includes a live recording of "Start The Riot!", also from Delete Yourself!. This live version was recorded during a live performance in Berlin on February 2, 1994.

== Track listing ==
Side A
No.	Title	Length
1.	"Midijunkies" (Remix)	6:20
2.	"Midijunkies"	4:50

Side B
No.	Title	Length
1.	"Speed"	2:50
2.	"Start The Riot!" (Live)	3:33
