= Redefine the Enemy – Rarities and B-Side Compilation 1992–1999 =

Redefine the Enemy! Rarities and B-Sides Compilation 1992–1999

Compilation album by Atari Teenage Riot
- Released: 26 November 2002
- Recorded: 1992–1999
- Genre: Digital hardcore, hardcore techno, hardcore punk
- Label: Digital Hardcore Recordings (Europe)
- Producer: Alec Empire

Atari Teenage Riot chronology
Live at Brixton Academy (1999)	Redefine the Enemy! Rarities and B-Sides Compilation 1992–1999 (2002)	Atari Teenage Riot: 1992–2000 (2006)

Professional ratings
Review scores
Source	Rating
AllMusic	3.5/5 stars

Redefine the Enemy! Rarities and B-Sides Compilation 1992–1999 is a B-side compilation of rare and live recordings by the seminal digital hardcore band Atari Teenage Riot.

== Track listing ==
1. "No Remorse" (Live in NY '99) - 5:37 (taken from Too Dead for Me EP)
2. "Revolution Action" (Live in San Fran '99) - 4:44 (taken from Too Dead for Me EP)
3. "Paranoid" (7" Remix) - 3:06
4. "Sick to Death" (Remix '97) - 5:55
5. "Deutschland (Has Gotta Die!)" (Remix) - 2:50
6. "You Can't Hold Us Back" (Instrumental) - 3:58
7. "Death of a President - DIY" (A Capella '99) - 0:27 (taken from Too Dead for Me EP)
8. "We've Got the Fucking Power" (Original '97) - 4:42
9. "Not Your Business" (Radio Version '95) - 2:30
10. "No Success" (hardbase Remix '99) - 4:18
11. "Midijunkies" (Remix '93) - 6:19
12. "Waves of Disaster" (Instrumental '97) - 5:08
13. "Waves of Disaster" (A Capella '97) - 4:19
14. "Redefine the Enemy" ('97) - 3:53
15. "Destroy 2000 Years of Culture" (Remix '97) - 4:22
16. "Sex" (Original Full Length Version '93) - 14:25
