= Kids Are United =

"Kids Are United!"

Single by Atari Teenage Riot

from the album Delete Yourself!
- B-side: "Cyberpunks Are Dead!"
- Released: 1993
- Recorded: 1993 at Empire Studios, Berlin
- Genre: Digital hardcore
- Length: 3:35
- Label: Vertigo Records, Phonogram
- Songwriters: Alec Empire, Jimmy Pursey, Dave Parsons
- Producers: Atari Teenage Riot, David Harrow

Atari Teenage Riot singles chronology
| "ATR" (1993) | "Kids Are United!" (1993) | "Speed/Midijunkies" (1995) |

"Kids Are United!" is a song by the German digital hardcore group Atari Teenage Riot, initially released as a single in 1993 on 12", 7", and CD formats. The track is largely based around a sample from the Sham 69 song "If the Kids Are United".

== Release history ==
Initially released as a stand-alone single in 1993, the track later found its way onto the group's first full-length effort Delete Yourself! in 1995. That same year, the Kids Are United E.P. was released, containing the title track and 8 extra tracks. One of those tracks, "Not Your Business", would later find its own separate release, as well as being issued on the band's second full-length, The Future of War. Also released in 1995 was a limited edition 7" containing live recordings of both "Kids Are United!" and "Start The Riot!", which was released as an edition of 1000. Note that the 7" version of the original 1993 single only contained the title track and "Cyberpunks Are Dead!".

== Track listings ==
=== Original 1993 release ===
Original 1993 release
| No. | Title | Length |
|---|---|---|
| 1. | "Kids Are United!" | 3:35 |
| 2. | "Kids Are United!" (No Difference Between Black And White Mix) | 3:42 |
| 3. | "Cyberpunks Are Dead!" | 3:35 |
| 4. | "Kids Are United!" (Happy Hardcore Mix) | 6:25 |

=== Kids Are United E.P. ===
| No. | Title | Length |
|---|---|---|
| 1. | "Kids Are United!" | 3:38 |
| 2. | "FFFF" ("BBBB" on 12" edition) | 0:19 |
| 3. | "Not Your Business" | 2:30 |
| 4. | "Riot Sounds Produce Riots" | 0:30 |
| 5. | "Strike" | 3:43 |
| 6. | "Deutschland (Has Gotta Die)" (Remix) | 2:51 |
| 7. | "Atari Teenage Riot" (Live Bootleg) | 4:04 |
| 8. | "P.O.F." | 0:36 |
