= Extasick =

French hardcore band

- Origin: Tours, France
- Genres: Digital hardcore Breakbeat; Punk rock Industrial
- Years active: 2003-present (on indefinite hiatus)
- Labels: D-Trash Records 2003-2004
- Members: Lewsor
- Website: http://extasick.free.fr/

Extasick is a digital hardcore band from Tours, France. The group is now initially led by lead guitarist/vocalist/programmer Lewsor, but the original line up featured guitarist/programmer/additional vocalist Barmy Failure. The group released their debut ...And This Dirty Musick on Canadian DHR based label D-Trash Records, and the album received a good review from Kerrang! and Terrorizor Magazine. Shortly after this release Barmy Failure left. The band is currently on hiatus while Lewsor concentrates on trying to make music for his upcoming album 'No Error Its Lewsor', and hopefully finds another musician to join Extasick. More recently, a two newer tune has appeared called Impratical Minefields and a cover of Atari Teenage Riot's song No Remorse on the group's myspace and a new album entitled Overdose may be released sometime in the near future.

== Discography ==
- ...And This Dirty Musick (D-Trash CDr, 2004)
- Overdose (unknown)

=== Lewsor solo discography ===
- Rather Die Than Hear That (self released)
- No Error Its Lewsor (possibly out sometime on Audiotrauma)
