= Lolita Storm =

British digital hardcore band

- Origin: Brighton, United Kingdom
- Genres: Digital hardcore; riot grrrl
- Years active: 1996–2006 (Note: No statement of ending and website does not exist anymore, though there are unreleased tracks on their MySpace page. The last Lolita Storm's song was published in 2006.)
- Labels: Rabid Badger, Digital Hardcore Recordings, 555 Recordings
- Members: Jimmy Too-Bad; Nhung Napalm; Spex
- Past members: Romy Medina

Lolita Storm was a digital hardcore band from the UK consisting of Nhung Napalm, Romy Medina, Jimmy Too-Bad, and Spex.

Its main characteristics are chanted punk lyrics about sex, celebrity hatred, drugs, and feminism. All are presented in a comical rather than deeply political form, backdrops of generally highly aggressive breakbeat. In their own words:

The whole point of Lolita Storm is that we’re a backlash against everything you know, style, music. Everything is boring and we decided that it’s about time that someone did something different and encouraged other people to do something different—to do their own thing.

— Nhung Napalm, Lolita Storm stand for nothing and hate everyone

== History ==
On the Rabid Badger label, they released their single debut, "Goodbye America" / "Get Back I'm Evil," in 1999. NME subsequently made this their "Single of the Week."

In 2000 they released "G.F.S.U." (an acronym for "Girls Fucking Shit Up"), their best-known work to date and only album, on the feminist "Fatal" sub-label on Digital Hardcore Recordings (abbreviated as DHR). Followed by two singles from the album: "Red Hot Riding Hood" and "Hot Lips Wet Pants." In August 1999 and June 2000, the band participated in two John Peel sessions.

Lolita Storm's last recording on DHR label was an EP, "Sick Slits," in 2001. The next single, "Studio 666 Smack Addict Commandos" / "I am Your Enemy," was released on 555 Recordings. They also self-released a single, "Dancing with the Ibiza Dogs," in 2004, after which the band disbanded.

Lolita Storm reunited in 2006 to record a song "Stranger Than Kindness" for a Nick Cave tribute album. Their song "Red Hot Riding Hood" from "G.F.S.U." album is in the club scene in 2017s Workin' Moms TV series - season 1, episode 8, "Hoop Earring."

After the split, Nhung Napalm (real name, Nhung Dang) later became a qualified counselor, hypnotherapist, and regression therapist.

== Discography ==
=== Studio albums ===
- "G.F.S.U." (DHR, 2000)

=== EPs ===
- "Sick Slits" (DHR, 2001)

=== Singles ===
- "Goodbye America" / "Get Back I'm Evil" (Rabid Badger, 1999)
- "Studio 666 Smack Addict Commandos" / "I Am Your Enemy" (555 Recordings, 2003)
- "Dancing with the Ibiza Dogs" (self-release, 2004)

=== Other recordings ===
- "Stranger Than Kindness" on "Eye for an Eye: A Tribute to Nick Cave" (Failure To Communicate Records, 2006)
- "Red Hot Riding Hood (Dist. mix)" on DHR LTD12 CD (Digital Hardcore Recordings, 2000)
- Disastronaut & Lolita Storm "I Wanna Be A China Girl" (Sonic Dragolgo remix) on "Muzik" compilation (Intikrec, 2002)

=== Videos ===
- "Red Hot Riding Hood"
