= Not Your Business =

Not Your Business E.P.

EP by Atari Teenage Riot
- Released: November 1996
- Recorded: 1995
- Studios: Empire Studios, Berlin
- Genre: Digital hardcore
- Labels: Grand Royal, Digital Hardcore Recordings
- Producer: Alec Empire

Atari Teenage Riot chronology
Kids Are United E.P. (1995)	Not Your Business E.P. (1996)	The Future of War (1997)

Not Your Business E.P. is an extended play by German digital hardcore group Atari Teenage Riot, initially released exclusively on 12" vinyl format in November 1996. The title track would later be included on the band's 1997 album The Future of War. In April 1997, the EP was placed at #48 on CMJ's Alternative Radio Airplay charts.

The title track would later appear on the compilations Burn, Berlin, Burn! and Redefine the Enemy - Rarities and B-Side Compilation 1992-1999. It was also included in the set list for the live album Live in Philadelphia Dec. 1997. All of the tracks that appear on this EP were previously released on the band's album Delete Yourself!

== Track listing ==
=== Side A ===
1. "Not Your Business"
2. "Atari Teenage Riot"

=== Side B ===
1. "Into the Death"
2. "Raverbashing"
3. "Midijunkies (Gonna Fuck You Up!)"
