= Live in Philadelphia =

Live in Philadelphia may refer to:

- Live in Philadelphia (Yes video), a video by Yes
- Live in Philadelphia, PA, an album by King Crimson
- Live in Philadelphia '70 an album by The Doors
- Live in Philadelphia Dec. 1997, an album by Atari Teenage Riot
