= Lewsor =

Notable digital art practitioner

- Origin: London
- Genres: Digital hardcore Breakbeat; Punk rock Industrial
- Years active: 2005-present
- Labels: Audiotrauma
- Members: Lewsor
- Website: http://www.lewsor.com

Lewsor (alternately, in Leet: L3WS0R) is the moniker of Mathieu Gosselin, a Digital Hardcore artist previously of Extasick. Lewsor put Extasick on hiatus to pursue his solo career.

== Discography ==
- Rather Die Than Hear That (What a Fake! Records, 2005)
- No Error (Audiotrauma, 2009)
