= If You're Into It, I'm Out of It =

Studio album by Christoph de Babalon
- Released: September 15, 1997
- Recorded: 1993–1996
- Genres: Breakcore; dark ambient; drum and bass; experimental
- Length: 77:06
- Label: Digital Hardcore Records (DHR 8)
- Producer: Christoph de Babalon

Christoph de Babalon chronology
Seven Up (1997)	If You're Into It, I'm Out of It (1997)	In A Bad Mood (1998)

If You're Into It, I'm Out of It is the second album by electronic producer Christoph de Babalon, initially released on September 15, 1997, through Digital Hardcore Recordings. The album is considered a standout record on the label and has been acclaimed for its idiosyncratic dark and heavy atmosphere while achieving a combination of dark ambient and early breakcore, in addition to drum and bass. Since its release, it has gained a cult following and received critical praise. A remastered edition of the album was later issued as a double disc LP set through Christoph de Babalon's Cross Fade Enter Tainment imprint.

== Background and composition ==
The album was produced and recorded sporadically between 1993 and 1996 on Amiga computers; the track "My Confession" was previously released on Christoph's Seven Up EP. "Opium", a 15-minute ambient drone piece, was chosen as the album's opener after a suggestion to Christoph by the staff of Digital Hardcore Recordings. In Philip Sherburne's review of the remastered edition of the album for Pitchfork Media, he described "Opium" as "a 15-and-a-half-minute swath of slowly cycling foghorn drones, church bells, and dubbed-out cries". Two other ambient pieces, "Brilliance" and "High Life (Theme)" share the same lo-fi industrial tone as "Opium" and are interspersed between characteristically heavy and rhythmic breakcore tracks, which Sherburne described as featuring elements of "face-punching breakbeats wrapped up in haywire synths and suffused in foggy wrongness" and "exploding breaks over queasy drones".

== Reception and legacy ==
Professional ratings
Review scores
Source	Rating
AllMusic	4.5/5 stars
Pitchfork	8.4/10

Although the album received little critical reception upon its initial 1997 release, the album has since grown very favorable among critics. In the AllMusic Guide's review for the album, written by Andy Kellman, the record is praised for its fresh style, stating that it "is a resistance to formula and gimmickry", rewarding the album a 4.5 out of 5. Thom Yorke, frontman of Radiohead, described the album as "the most menacing album I own". Digital Hardcore Recordings operator and Atari Teenage Riot member Alec Empire is also a very big fan of the album, saying that it is the most important release put out through the label. In his review of the 2018 remaster, Philip Sherburne, writing for Pitchfork, concluded that "no one has ever made another record quite like this one". The remastered edition was named as one of the best reissues of 2018 by electronic music review site Resident Advisor.

Music journalists have often brought up If You're Into It, I'm Out of It as a landmark combination of dark ambient and rhythmically oriented electronic music. For Spin, Sherburne praised the album in an article about electronic duo Demdike Stare and their influences, stating that the album made "dark ambient and jungle a hellishly compelling couple". Breakcore producer Enduser has credited the album as an inspiration for his music.

== Track listing ==
No.	Title	Length
1.	"Opium"	15:30
2.	"Nostep"	3:38
3.	"Expressure"	5:00
4.	"What You Call a Life"	5:00
5.	"Water"	4:39
6.	"Brilliance"	7:11
7.	"Dead (Too)"	6:11
8.	"Damaged III"	4:29
9.	"Release"	4:27
10.	"High Life (Theme)"	11:05
11.	"My Confession"	9:54
Total length:		77:06
