= Funbox (theatre group) =

Scottish musical theatre group

- Origin: Scotland
- Genres: Children's songs
- Years active: 2015–2022
- Members: Anya Scott-Rodgers; Kevin McLeod; Gary Coupland
- Website: https://www.funbox.co.uk

Funbox was a Scottish musical theatre group and children entertainers. The group toured, performing music and comedy for children, with a focus on traditional Scottish playground songs. The group disbanded in 2022, having their final show at the Glasgow Royal Concert Hall.

== Origins ==
Members Anya Scott-Rodgers, Kevin MacLeod and Gary Coupland were all previously members of The Singing Kettle, when it disbanded in 2015 after 30 years. The three were informed that the touring "Singing Kettle" company was not available for purchase, after the retirement of two of the group's founding members in 2012. They therefore formed Funbox. The group's first appearance was at the 2015 Celtic Connections, followed by their debut tour, Pirates and Princesses, in 2015.

== Members ==
=== Gary Coupland ===
Gary Coupland MBE was the group's musician and composer. He was one of the original members of The Singing Kettle. He studied at Napier University (where he was named Alumni of the Year in 2014)and at The London College of Music. He received an MBE in 1999 for services to children’s theatre and is a patron of Down's Syndrome Scotland.

=== Kevin Macleod ===
Kevin Macleod was originally The Singing Kettle's stage manager, before joining the group and later forming Funbox. He also played 'Bonzo', a canine character he brought with him from The Singing Kettle. He studied stage management at Queen Margaret College and compères at Celtic Connections and the Orkney Folk Festival.

=== Anya Scott-Rodgers ===
Anya Scott-Rodgers fronted The Singing Kettle in 2013 after auditioning. She is a graduate of Glasgow University, Reid Kerr College and Glasgow College of Nautical Studies. She plays guitar.
