= Live in Philadelphia Dec. 1997 =

Live album by Atari Teenage Riot
- Released: 1999
- Recorded: December 21, 1997
- Venues: Beyond Nightclub, Philadelphia, Pennsylvania, U.S.
- Labels: Digital Hardcore Recordings, Elektra

Live in Philadelphia Dec. 1997 is a live album by Atari Teenage Riot. The CD version was distributed with certain pressings of 60 Second Wipeout. The album was recorded at the Beyond Nightclub in Philadelphia on December 21, 1997.

== Track listing ==
=== CD pressing ===
1. "Get Up While You Can" – 5:10
2. "Deutschland Has Gotta Die!" – 3:03
3. "Sick To Death" – 3:45
4. "Destroy 2000 Years Of Culture" – 3:51
5. "Not Your Business" – 2:59
6. "Speed" – 5:20
7. "Into The Death" – 3:24
8. "Atari Teenage Riot" – 3:17
9. "Midijunkies" – 7:41

=== 12" vinyl pressing ===
Side A

1. "Get Up While You Can"
2. "Deutschland Has Gotta Die!"
3. "Sick To Death"
4. "Destroy 2000 Years Of Culture"
5. "Not Your Business"

Side B

1. "Speed"
2. "Into The Death"
3. "Atari Teenage Riot"
4. "Midijunkies"
