= 60 Second Wipe Out =

Studio album by Atari Teenage Riot
- Released: 11 May 1999
- Genres: Hardcore punk, digital hardcore
- Length: 54:20
- Label: Digital Hardcore
- Producer: Alec Empire

Atari Teenage Riot chronology
Burn, Berlin, Burn! (1997)	60 Second Wipe Out (1999)	Live at Brixton Academy (1999)

Singles from 60 Second Wipe Out
- 1. "Atari Teenage Riot II" Released: 1999; 2. "Too Dead for Me" Released: 1 October 1999; 3. "Revolution Action" Released: 28 December 1999

Professional ratings
Review scores
Source	Rating
AllMusic	3/5 stars
Christgau's Consumer Guide	(dud)
Entertainment Weekly	B+
Pitchfork	3.6/10
Rolling Stone	3/5 stars
Wall of Sound	66/100

60 Second Wipe Out is the third studio album by Atari Teenage Riot. It was originally released through Digital Hardcore Recordings in 1999. It peaked at number 17 on the UK Independent Albums Chart, as well as number 32 on the Billboard Heatseekers Albums chart.

== Critical reception ==
John Bush of AllMusic gave the album 3 stars out of 5, saying, "60 Second Wipe Out has all of the ingredients fans could expect from their favorite anarcho-hardcore-electronica group." Marc Weingarten of Entertainment Weekly gave the album a grade of B+, saying: "Wielding break beats like ninja stars and synth bleets like num-chucks, [Alec] Empire performs mad chopsocky maneuvers that will turn you into a glutton for punishment."

== Track listing ==
No.	Title	Writer(s)	Length
1.	"Revolution Action"	Alec Empire, Hanin Elias	4:09
2.	"By Any Means Necessary"	Empire	2:38
3.	"Western Decay"	Empire	5:50
4.	"Atari Teenage Riot II"	Empire	6:08
5.	"Ghostchase"	Empire, Elias	4:34
6.	"Too Dead for Me"	Empire, Elias	4:17
7.	"U.S. Fade Out"	Empire	2:52
8.	"The Virus Has Been Spread"	Empire	1:15
9.	"Digital Hardcore"	Empire	4:11
10.	"Death of a President D.I.Y.!"	Empire, Elias	4:43
11.	"Your Uniform (Does Not Impress Me!)"	Empire, David Melendez	5:48
12.	"No Success"	Empire, Elias, Melendez, Kathleen Hanna	3:48
13.	"Anarchy 999"	Empire, Melendez, R. Wallace, G. Barreto, J. Perez, Anthony Quiles	4:07

2000 US reissue edition CD bonus track
No.	Title	Length
14.	"No Remorse (I Wanna Die)"	4:15

Limited edition bonus disc: Live in Philadelphia Dec. 1997
No.	Title	Length
1.	"Get Up While You Can"	5:10
2.	"Deutschland Has Gotta Die!"	3:03
3.	"Sick to Death"	3:45
4.	"Destroy 2000 Years of Culture"	3:51
5.	"Not Your Business"	2:59
6.	"Speed"	5:20
7.	"Into the Death"	3:24
8.	"Atari Teenage Riot"	3:17
9.	"Midijunkies"	7:41

== Personnel ==
Credits adapted from liner notes.

Atari Teenage Riot

- Alec Empire – vocals, programming
- Hanin Elias – vocals
- Carl Crack – MC
- Nic Endo – samples

Additional musicians

- Dino Cazares – guitar (10)
- D-Stroy – vocals (11, 12, 13)
- Freestyle – vocals (12, 13)
- Kathleen Hanna – vocals (12)
- Jise – vocals (13)
- Kinetics – vocals (13)
- Q-Unique – vocals (13)

Technical personnel

- Alec Empire – mixing (10, 11, 13)
- Andy Wallace – mixing (1, 2, 3, 4, 5, 6, 7, 8, 9, 10, 11, 13)
- Dave Sardy – mixing (12)
- Steve Rooke – mastering

== Charts ==
Chart	Peak position
UK Independent Albums (OCC)	17
US Heatseekers Albums (Billboard)	32
