= The Singing Kettle =

Scottish folk music group

- Also known as: Artie's Singing Kettle (2019–present)
- Origin: Kingskettle, Fife, Scotland
- Genres: Folk music, Comedy music, Children's songs
- Years active: 1982–2015, 2019–present
- Label: Kettle Productions
- Members: Artie Trezise
- Past members: Cilla Fisher; Gary Coupland; Jane Fisher; Kevin McLeod; Anya Scott-Rodgers
- Website: http://www.singingkettle.com

The Singing Kettle (also known as Artie's Singing Kettle) are a folk music and entertainment group from Scotland who perform traditional children's songs, along with live theatre performances. Originally from the village of Kingskettle in Fife, they were formed by established folk singers Cilla Fisher and Artie Trezise, eventually being joined by musician Gary Coupland. In 2012, founding member Fisher retired from performing with the group, and Trezise did the same. After 6 years of presenting Tartan Tales Trezise decided to produce new Singing Kettle shows that he presents solo under the name "Artie's Singing Kettle".

The group were awarded a BAFTA for best children's TV programme and Fisher, Trezise and Coupland were made MBEs for their services to the entertainment industry.

== Career ==
Logo

Husband and wife Cilla Fisher and Artie Trezise started touring as a folk singing duo in the mid-1970s.

The group name "The Singing Kettle" came about in 1982. Their first venture under this title was a children's album, featuring everything from traditional Scottish rhymes to songs learned on their folk tour of the US. A group of children contributed backing vocals for certain tracks, including their daughter Jane, creating the first set of "Kettle Kids".

The idea came of turning The Singing Kettle album into a show, as they were unimpressed by other, few, children's theatre shows at the time. The show toured to primary schools, with the idea of clues for songs found inside kettles, and for this they recruited their friend, musician Gary Coupland. The touring show eventually developed into a more plot-led piece of musical theatre and they began performing in large scale theatres across the country. Over the years the Singing Kettle have presented their own specially written shows including The Boogie Woogie Zoo, The Time Machine, Pirates, Wild West Show, Medieval Madness, World Tour, Funny Farm, and Homemade Band. Additionally some of their shows have raised awareness of important topics, notably road safety (Busy Road Show), good dental hygiene (Tooth Happy Songs) and pollution (one of the Adventures in Kettleland episodes).

They were joined for a time by Cilla and Artie's daughter, Jane, who left to be in the electro band Motormark, replaced by Kevin McLeod – the former company stage manager. In 2003 Smithsonian Folkways Recordings released The Singing Kettle: Singalong Songs from Scotland, the group's first recording to be widely distributed outside the United Kingdom.

Alongside the being performers, Cilla sang while the rest composed the theme song to a children's cartoon series, Meeow!, which ran from 2000 to 2002 on Children's ITV. Meeow! was latterly shown on wknd@stv in 2009.

Aside from their several albums of traditional children's music, The Singing Kettle has also released several DVDs and made five television series with BBC Scotland and two television series with ITV. They toured regularly throughout the United Kingdom, performing their highly successful stage show. They have performed command performances before both Prince Charles and Jordan's royal family. The three founding members of The Singing Kettle (Fisher, Trezise, and Coupland) have each been honoured with the MBE. There was a Singing Kettle Shop in Kingskettle which sold all sorts of different merchandise, as well as being home to the company offices.

The group announced in October 2012 that they were auditioning for a new permanent member. Later that month they announced that Fisher and Trezise were retiring from performing and would continue to work on writing and behind the scenes. Coupland and McLeod were joined by Anya Scott-Rodgers.

In September 2014, the group announced that the 'Big Christmas Party' show would be their final tour, and that they would be breaking up in February 2015 after 32 years. The group performed their last show in Aberdeen on 15 February 2015. McLeod, Coupland and Anya continued to work together in a group called Funbox; this came to an end in 2022.

In 2018, Artie returned to touring with a show called 'Artie's Tartan Tales' performing songs from the kettle and telling stories. In 2017, he was accompanied on festival dates with musical performer Ryan Moir. The following year he announced he would be bringing back 'the kettles'. He started touring once again with his live show 'Artie's Singing Kettle Show'. He later toured with a new show called 'Artie's Singing Kettle Sing-along. In October 2019 he toured with his Halloween show called 'Artie's Singing Kettle Holloween Show. A Christmas show followed in December. In early 2020, he set up a new YouTube channel featuring videos of him singing songs from the shows and his postponed tour; along with a different coloured kettle. The videos were recorded from home in order to comply with pandemic restrictions.

== Cast ==
=== Cilla Fisher ===
(Songwriter/Producer/Director)

Cilla Fisher MBE (born 26 September 1952) made her musical debut on BBC Radio Scotland at the age of 9. She started performing with Trezise in 1974. In the shows, Fisher played the character of Maw. She still occasionally sings solo in pubs and clubs for adults.

Her brother, Archie, and sister, Ray, both enjoyed success in the folk music industry when they were young. Ray died in 2011 and Archie died in 2025. Fisher retired as a performer in the show, along with Trezise, at the end of the 'Fairytale Castle' tour in February 2013.

=== Artie Trezise ===
(Producer/Managing Director)

Artie Trezise MBE (born 3 April 1947) left his teaching job to tour in regional pubs and clubs as a folk singer. He started performing with Fisher in 1974. In the shows, Trezise played Willie and Jeremy.

In other work, he gives talks to American tourists and Danish school teachers about The Singing Kettle's work.

=== Gary Coupland ===
Gary Coupland was the musician for the group. He joined "Cilla & Artie" for a tour of Scotland, which started The Singing Kettle. He received an MBE in 1999.

=== Jane Fisher ===
Jane Fisher (born c. 1973) is daughter to Cilla and Artie. She had worked as a backing vocalist on some of The Singing Kettle's LP's and albums before joining the group as a front in 1995. She left the band after the "Winter Wonderland Tour" in 2002 to join Motormark and is now in FANGS.

=== Kevin Macleod ===
Kevin Macleod (born 9 March 1969) worked as The Singing Kettle's stage manager for years before joining the group.

Macleod first appeared in the 2001 Christmas tour 'Winter Wonderland' and can be heard on the cassette. This was a cross-over show, that also featured Jane prior to her departure. This was the only time there were 5 members in the show at once.

He later joined the group for their "Jungle Party Tour" in 2002 and was in the group until 2015. Macleod also played the characters of Bonzo, Henry and Jock during the shows.

=== Anya Scott-Rodgers ===
Anya Scott-Rodgers (born 7 October 1987) joined the group upon the retirement of Fisher and Trezise as performers in the show. Anya was auditioned from hundreds of applicants from all over the world and became the new face of the Singing Kettle.

== Characters ==
=== Willie, Henry and Maw ===
Willie and Maw (played by Trezise and Fisher) started during the late 1980s in "cutaway" scenes from the group on their stage and TV shows. Willie and Maw were highlights of The Singing Kettle's tours until the 2002 line-up change, when Willie's "long lost brother" Henry (played by MacLeod) arrived and Maw was dropped from the show. Willie and Henry last appeared on the "Christmas Pyjama Party Tour" in the 2009/10 Christmas season show.

=== Bonzo ===
Bonzo the Dog (played by Macleod) is the "pet" of the group who first appeared in "The Homemade Band Show" as an angry next door neighbour. After the success of The Homemade Band Show and the interest in the character of Bonzo, he returned for "The Jungle Party" and went on to appear in all following shows.

Bonzo has become a favourite with The Singing Kettle's fans. He was made into a toy and it was a bestseller in the group's merchandise. A collection of Bonzo's appearances on the tours, along with special recordings was released on DVD in 2005.

The character of Bonzo continued to appear in Coupland, McLeod and Anya's show, Funbox.

=== Jock and Jeremy ===
Jock and Jeremy (also played by Trezise and MacLeod) replaced Willie and Henry for the "Boogie Woogie Zoo" tour (and onwards) as two chefs. Following Trezise's retirement as a performer, Macleod continued to play Jock until the final tour in 2015.

== TV series ==
The television series was commissioned by BBC Scotland after visiting the group performing in Dunfermline in 1988. When Liz Scott, the director of the series showed Anna Home, BBC Head of Children's programmes, she did not believe it would transfer well to other parts of the UK. She thought it was "too couthie and very Scottish".

BBC produced five series of The Singing Kettle between 1989 and 1993, which featured the original band members, Fisher, Trezise and Coupland. These series were later repeated on the BBC Schools programming thread from 1994 to 1996.

In 1995, the group starred in The Singing Kettle News for ITV's Scottish Television channel which was followed by The Singing Kettle Show in 2000. These two series also featured Jane, in addition to the original three members. In 2016, the series began airing on STV Glasgow and STV Edinburgh as part of their 'Wean's World' children's programming strand.

== "Spout, handle, lid of metal..." ==
"Spout, handle, lid of metal, What's inside the Singing Kettle?" was created by Fisher just before the BBC came to visit the group perform in Dunfermline in 1988, as they believed they needed something for the BBC. The rhyme has been used in the majority of songs selected onto the playlist.

One exception was in the 1991 Christmas Cracker Show for the BBC, where song clues were in giant crackers (with a kettle shaped card attached bearing a riddle with clues to what is inside) and this sentence was chanted by Fisher and Trezise over the Singing Kettle rhyme's backing music (where the children join in is denoted in bold): "Well, there's only one way for us to find out, so as loud as you can... [cue prompt to audience]... crack the cracker!" However the original rhyme was used in part three of backstage commentary where Trezise, Fisher and Coupland were retrieving their Christmas presents from Father Christmas, which were placed inside a kettle.

Another exception was in the mid-1990s 'Singing Kettle News' shows for Scottish Television where the rhyme was used at the end shortly before the closing credits in each episode, to retrieve the newspapers that had been put together that episode (which were put in a kettle when they'd been published).

== Discography ==
A small selection. In total 39 CD have been released including 3 greatest hits albums.

- 1979 - Cilla and Artie Topic
- 1982 - The Singing Kettle
- 1985 - The Singing Kettle 2
- 1987 - The Singing Kettle 3
- 1989 - The Singing Kettle 4

== Videos ==
- 1990 - The Singing Kettle (BBC Video)
- 1991 - The Singing Kettle 2 (BBC Video)
- 1992 - The Singing Kettle 3 (BBC Video)
- 1992 - The Singing Kettle Christmas Crackers (BBC Video)
- 1993 - Adventures in Kettle Land (BBC Video)
- 1994 - Very Best of the Singing Kettle (BBC Video)
- 1994 - World Tour (PolyGram Video)
- 1995 - Pirates (PolyGram Video)
- 1996 - Christmas Party (PolyGram Video)
- 1997 - The Singing Kettle News: Daly News
- 1997 - The Busy Roadshow
- The Singing Kettle News: Sing All About It
- The Best of the Singing Kettle News
- 1998 - Best Loved Singalong Songs
- Get up and Go
- Tooth Happy Songs
- 2001 - Silly Circus
- 2002 - Homemade Band Show
- 2003 - Toytown
- Merry Christmas Show
- Jungle Party
- 2003 - Medieval Madness
- 2004 - Deep Sea Adventures

In 2009 Blue Bleezin' Blind Drunk sung by Fisher from Cilla and Artie was included in Topic Records 70-year anniversary boxed set Three Score and Ten as track six on the fourth CD.

== DVDs ==
- Christmas Party
- Silly Circus
- Homemade Band
- Jungle Party
- Toytown
- Blast Off
- Wild West Show
- Deep Sea Adventures
- Pirate Island
- Old Mcdonald's Farm
- Medieval Madness
- Funny Farm Show
- Calamity Castle
- Rumble in the Jungle
- Fantastic Funfair
- 2 DVD Collection: Silly Circus/Homemade Band
- 2 DVD Collection: ToyTown/Jungle Party
- 4 DVD Box Set Collection
- Bonzo: Singalong Adventures
- The Singing Kettle LIVE

== Live shows ==
Year	Title of Show	Notes
1986	"Scotch Broth"	Various venues in Stirling, including Macrobert Arts Centre
1989	"The Singing Kettle at Christmas"	Byre Theatre, St Andrews
1990	"Down in the Jungle"	
1990	"Crackers at Christmas"	
1991	"Street Party"	
1991	"Inspector Parrot and the Big Green Planet"	
1992	"Wild West Show"	
1993	"The Boogie Woogie Zoo"	
1993	"World Tour"	First Live Video in 1994. Loosely inspired by Jules Verne's Around the World in 80 Days. World Tour logo is a homage of the Universal Studios 1920s logo.
1993	"Christmas Kettle Show"	Exclusive to Glasgow Royal Concert Hall
1993	"Christmas in Kettleland"	Exclusive to Glasgow SECC.
1994	"Down in the Jungle"	
1994	"Time Machine"	
1994	"Giant Christmas Present"	Exclusive to Glasgow SECC.
1995	"Pirates!"	As Seen on Scottish Television.
1995	"Christmas Party"	First appearance of Jane. Exclusive to Glasgow SECC. As Seen on Border Television.
1996	"Wild West Show"	Remake (1992 show)
1996	"Seaside Special"	
1996	"Christmas Wishes"	Exclusive to Glasgow SECC.
1997	"Party Time"	
1997	"Busy Road Show"	As Seen on Border Television.
1997	"Jingle Bells"	Exclusive to Glasgow Royal Concert Hall.
1998	"The Big Band Show"	
1998	"World Tour"	Remake (1993 show)
1998	"Santa's Musical Workshop"	
1999	"Funny Farm"	
1999	"Millennium Christmas Party"	
2000	"Homemade Band Show"	First appearance of Bonzo.
2000	"Pirates at Christmas"	
2001	"Pirates!"	Remake (1995 show)
2001	"Silly Circus"	
2001	"Winter Wonderland"	Last appearance of Jane and Maw, and first appearance of McLeod [Both appear on Winter Wonderland Cassette]
2002	"Jungle Party"	First filmed appearance of McLeod and Henry.
2002	"Toytown"	Filmed at His Majesty's Theatre, Aberdeen
2003	"Medieval Madness"	First show released on DVD.
2003	"Merry Christmas Show"	Last Christmas show to be recorded
2004	"Deep Sea Adventures"	
2004	"Santa's Big Surprise"	
2005	"Blast Off"	Last show to be released on Video.
2005	"Christmas Magic"	
2006	"Magic Shop"	
2006	"Old MacDonald's Farm"	
2006	"Christmas Wonderland"	
2007	"Wild West Show"	Remake (1992 and 1996 show)
2007	"Party Time"	Remake (1997 show)
2008	"Pirate Island"	
2008	"Christmas Toyshop"	
2009	"Magical Toyshop"	
2009	"Boogie Woogie Zoo"	First appearance of Jock and Jeremy. Remake (1993 show)
2009	"Christmas Pyjama Party"	
2010	"Pyjama Party"	Last appearance of Willie and Henry.
2010	"Calamity Castle"	
2010	"Silly Songs"	
2010	"Pirate Party"	Exclusive to Shetland and Orkney.
2010	Fun Factory"	
2011	"The Funny Farm"	Remake (1999 show)
2011	"Farmyard Party" / "Pirate Party"	
2011	"Christmas Fancy Dress Party"	
2012	"Fancy Dress Party"	
2012	"Shake Rattle And Roll"	
2012	"Fairytale Christmas" / "Fairytale Castle"	Last appearance of Fisher and Trezise. Last Christmas show to be released on DVD.
2013	"Rumble in the Jungle"	First appearance of Anya and Pom Pom
2013	"Magic Wishing Well"	
2014	"Fantastic Funfair"	Last show to be released on DVD
2014	"The Big Christmas Party"	Last tour as a collective
2015	"The Big Party"	Last Singing Kettle show as a collective
2019	"Artie's Singing Kettle Show"	Tour featuring Artie only
2019	"Artie's Singing Kettle Holloween Show	Featuring Artie only
2019	"Artie's Christmas Show"	Featuring Artie only
2020	Artie's Singing Kettle Sing-along	Tour featuring Artie only
2023	Artie's Singing Kettle - Silly Songs	Featuring Artie solo
2024	Artie's Singing Kettle - Greatest Hits	Artie Solo Tour

== See also ==
- Music of Scotland
