= EC8OR =

- Origin: Berlin, Germany
- Genres: Digital hardcore Gabber; Hardcore techno Industrial; Noise
- Years active: 1995–2000
- Labels: Digital Hardcore Recordings; Grand Royal
- Members: Patric Catani; Gina V. D'Orio

EC8OR (pronounced Ecator, a contraction of "Eradicator") is a German digital hardcore band founded in 1995 by Patric Catani and Gina V. D'Orio and signed by Alec Empire's Digital Hardcore Recordings record label. The music was in the same vein of Atari Teenage Riot's style of early Breakcore and hardcore techno with a punk edge, which led to EC8OR been overlooked by fans of digital hardcore recordings, but EC8OR employed more low-res ideas as the first album was entirely composed on Amiga 500 and with a microphone.

EC8OR gained considerable attention in North America in 1997, when the Beastie Boys' pet-label Grand Royal Records released "All Of Us Can Be Rich...", a collection of earlier material on Digital Hardcore Recordings. This led to features and press on the band in Rolling Stone and Alternative Press.

The duo released 5 albums from 1995 to 2000 and have continued to record after the great DHR implosion of the millennium, and still collaborate often, although Patric and Gina are no longer signed to Digital Hardcore Recordings. Patric would later display his dislike of the state the label is currently in, as he said in an interview "The fact that all the bands surrounding [Atari Teenage Riot] just got used for their sellout idea–to have a whole 'movement' and 'followers'–led to psychological warfare which some people didn't survive. There was no trust anymore at some point and no communication. It was very strange for [artists on the] label to read in the New Music Express or other papers all these weird, made-up stories [about them]. The records were produced with different budgets and went through different channels and distributions. For me, it was necessary to leave that crap behind."

EC8OR is on a permanent hiatus although the duo played a one-off gig in Dresden in 2005, and have recently collaborated under the name A*class, whereas Gina still performs in her other band Cobra Killer and with former Shizuo vocalist Annika Trost.

== Discography ==
- Ec8or & Moonraker (Mono Tone)
- AK-78 (Digital Hardcore Recordings)
- Ec8or (Digital Hardcore Recordings)
- Cocaine Ducks (Grand Royal / Digital Hardcore Recordings)
- Spex Is A Fat Bitch (Digital Hardcore Recordings)
- All Of Us Can Be Rich... (Grand Royal)
- Discriminate (Against) The Next Fashionsucker You Meet - It's A Raver (Grand Royal)
- Until Everything Explodes (Digital Hardcore Recordings)
- World Beaters (Digital Hardcore Recordings) – #64 CMJ Radio Top 200
- Dynamite (Digital Hardcore Recordings)
- Gimme Nyquil All Night Long / I Won't Pay (Digital Hardcore Recordings)
- The One And Only High And Low (Digital Hardcore Recordings)
- EC8OR-Live in Dresden 10-01-05 in Dresden (CDr)
