= The Future of War =

Studio album by Atari Teenage Riot
- Released: 17 March 1997
- Recorded: 1995–1996
- Studio: Empire Studios, Berlin; MK Audio, Berlin
- Genre: Digital hardcore
- Length: 43:52
- Label: Digital Hardcore Recordings (Europe); Grand Royal (U.S.)
- Producer: Alec Empire

Atari Teenage Riot chronology
Delete Yourself! (1995)	The Future of War (1997)	Burn, Berlin, Burn! (1997)

Singles from The Future of War
- 1. "Not Your Business" Released: November 1996; 2. "Deutschland Has Gotta Die!" Released: 9 December 1996; 3. "Sick to Death" Released: 17 February 1997; 4. "Destroy 2000 Years of Culture" Released: 15 December 1997

Professional ratings
Review scores
Source	Rating
AllMusic	3.0/5 stars
NME	4/10

The Future of War is the second studio album by Atari Teenage Riot.

Faster and harder than their previous effort, the album sees the band's only female member at the time, Hanin Elias, providing vocals for a larger share of the songs. In May 2002, The Future of War was placed on the Bundesprüfstelle für jugendgefährdende Medien index in Germany, meaning that it may not be advertised or sold to minors. According to band member Alec Empire, Future of War was notable for its "left-rooted critique of the 'modern' high-tech-war, as we had seen it all some years previously during the Gulf War."

== Track listing ==
All tracks are written by Alec Empire, except where noted.

No.	Title	Writer(s)	Length
1.	"Get Up While You Can"		3:28
2.	"Fuck All!"		3:08
3.	"Sick to Death"		3:40
4.	"P.R.E.S.S."		4:19
5.	"Deutschland (Has Gotta Die!)"	Empire, Hanin Elias	3:02
6.	"Destroy 2000 Years of Culture"		3:51
7.	"Not Your Business"		2:32
8.	"You Can't Hold Us Back"		4:00
9.	"Heatwave"		2:43
10.	"Redefine the Enemy"		3:58
11.	"Death Star"		5:23
12.	"The Future of War"		3:48
Total length:			43:52

2nd Pressing Bonus Tracks
No.	Title	Length
13.	"She Sucks My Soul Away"	4:30
14.	"Strike"	3:43
15.	"Midijunkies" (Berlin Mix)	6:20
Total length:		58:25

Samples credits

- "Sick To Death" samples "Sick of You" by The Users, "Decadent Jew" by The Nuns, and anime "Urotsukidoji II: Legend of the Demon Womb" (English dubbed version).
- "Fuck All" samples "Pay to Cum" by Bad Brains.
- "Destroy 2000 Years of Culture" samples "Dead Skin Mask" by Slayer.
- "Heatwave" samples "Supertouch" by Bad Brains.
- "Not Your Business" samples "Back to Bataan" by The Maids.
- "Deutschland (Has Gotta Die!)" samples "I'm In Love With Today" by The Users

== Personnel ==
Atari Teenage Riot

- Alec Empire – vocals, programming, production
- Hanin Elias – vocals
- Carl Crack – MC

Additional

- Janek Siegle – assistant engineer
- Henni Hell – cover art
- Phillipp Virus – photography
