= Live at Brixton Academy (Atari Teenage Riot album) =

Live album by Atari Teenage Riot
- Released: 24 July 2000
- Recorded: Live at the Brixton Academy, London, 1999
- Genre: Noise
- Length: 26:38
- Label: Digital Hardcore Recordings
- Producer: Alec Empire

Atari Teenage Riot chronology
60 Second Wipe Out (1999)	Live at Brixton Academy (2000)	Redefine the Enemy (2001)

Live at Brixton Academy is a live album from German digital hardcore group Atari Teenage Riot, recorded and released in 1999. The album was recorded while they supported Nine Inch Nails on tour, and contains no songs from any of the past albums, just harsh noise. Live at Brixton Academy was ATR's final album before they disbanded in 2000, their actual final release being the Rage EP.

== Reception ==
Professional ratings
Review scores
Source	Rating
AllMusic	3/5 stars
NME	(11/10)
Select	1/5 stars

Select gave the album a one star rating out of five. The review stated that "it works almost as a parody of how an avant-noise album is supposed to sound", describing the album as "mercifully clocking in at under 30 minutes" and criticizing the siren wails which were described as "the electronic equivalent of histrionic guitar solo".

== Track listing ==
1. (Untitled) – 26:38
