= Digital Hardcore Recordings =

Record label

- Founded: 1994
- Founder: Joel Amaretto; Alec Empire; Pete Lawton
- Genre: Digital hardcore
- Country of origin: United Kingdom
- Location: London, England
- Official website: http://www.digitalhardcore.com

Digital Hardcore Recordings (DHR) is a record label set up in 1994 by Alec Empire, Joel Amaretto and Pete Lawton. Most of the music is recorded in Berlin, though the label is based in London where the records are mastered and manufactured. The funds for setting up the label came from the payment which Atari Teenage Riot received for their aborted record deal with the major UK record label Phonogram Records.

The label is acclaimed for its articulation of the digital hardcore style of music: "digital hardcore" is used not only to refer to the record label itself, but to the genre that its artists helped to create. Several artists to this day, though not affiliated with the DHR label, would classify themselves as digital hardcore, tangible proof of DHR's solid influence on the industrial/electronic scene as well as on the rock/metal-scene.

In 1995 DHR released its first album (they had previously only released a 12" in 1994) and a compilation, Harder Than The Rest. Digital Hardcore Festival events were held in several German cities, and the Suicide Club in Berlin, run by a friend of ATR, provided a platform to new bands such as EC8OR. The word about DHR spread to underground scenes in Japan, USA, Australia and Europe. BBC Radio 1 DJ John Peel heard about DHR and invited Atari Teenage Riot to play in London.

In 1996 DHR made a distribution deal for the US on the Beastie Boys' Grand Royal label then DHR toured there and South East Asia. Atari Teenage Riot toured in support of bands such as Jon Spencer Blues Explosion, Beck, Rage Against the Machine and Wu-Tang Clan. In 1997 Atari Teenage Riot, Shizuo and Ec8or embarked on a Digital Hardcore tour of the United States.

In 1998 DHR established an office in New York City and its studios in Berlin. In the ensuing years Atari Teenage Riot came under a lot of pressure, amongst other reasons because of member Carl Crack's psychosis (and subsequent death). By 2000 the Berlin music scene in which DHR had found its place was declining, Atari Teenage Riot disbanded and no new groups or artists were being signed to DHR. At the end of that year Alec Empire decided to restructure DHR and began work on a new album.

In 2002 Empire released Intelligence and Sacrifice and played shows in the US. He became aware of the growing digital hardcore scene there, releasing a compilation of American bands on DHR entitled Don't Fuck With Us!

Although at present the label is seen as less influential than it was in the 1990s, DHR is nevertheless recognised for its role in the emergence of breakcore, as well as promoting music its artists believed in.

== Discography ==
=== EPs, singles and videos ===
Cat No.	Title	Artist	Format	Year
DHR 1	Digital Hardcore EP	Alec Empire	12"	1994
DHR 2	Uzi Party EP	DJ Bleed	12"	1994
DHR 3	Suburban Soundtracks Pt. 1	Sonic Subjunkies	12"	1994
DHR 4	Death EP	Alec Empire	12"	1994
DHR 5	Turntable Terrorist EP	Sonic Subjunkies	12"	1995
DHR 6 DHR MCD 6	Show EP	Hanin Elias	12"; CD	1996
DHR 7	Destroy Berlin!	Christoph de Babalon	12"	1996
DHR 8 DHR MCD 8	AK-78	EC8OR	12"; CD	1996
DHR 9 DHR MCD 9	Spex Is A Fat Bitch	EC8OR	12"; CD	1996
DHR 10; DHR MCD 10	Speed/Midijunkies	Atari Teenage Riot	12"; CD	1995
DHR 11; DHR MCD 11	Kids Are United E.P.	Atari Teenage Riot	12"; CD	1995
DHR 12; DHR MCD 12	Sick to Death E.P.	Atari Teenage Riot	12"; CD	1997
DHR 14; DHR MCD 14	High On Emotion EP	Shizuo	12"; CD	1996
DHR 15; DHR MCD 15	Destroy 2000 Years of Culture	Atari Teenage Riot	12"; CD	1997
DHR 16; DHR MCD 16	Seven Up EP	Christoph de Babalon	12"; CD	1997
DHR 17; DHR MCD 17	New Kick E.P.	Shizuo	12"; CD	1997
DHR MCD 18	Until Everything Explodes	EC8OR	CD	1997
DHR 19; DHR MCD 19	Human Distortion	16-17	12"; CD	1998
DHR 20	Choice of the Righteous	Bomb 20	12"	1996
DHR 21; DHR MCD 21	Flip Burgers or Die!!!!!	Bomb 20	12"; CD	1998
DHR 22; DHR MCD 22	White Heat	Nic Endo	12"; CD	1998
DHR 23	Right Into A Kick For More	Cobra Killer	7"	1998
DHR 24; DHR MCD 24	Revolution Action	Atari Teenage Riot	12"; CD	1999
DHR 25; DHR MCD 25	In Flames EP	Hanin Elias	12"; CD	1999
DHR 26; DHR MCD 26	Too Dead For Me EP	Atari Teenage Riot	12"; CD	1999
DHR 27; DHR MCD 27	Rage E.P.	Atari Teenage Riot	12"; CD	2000
DHR 28; DHR MCD 28	Hot Lips, Wet Pants/I Luv Speed	Lolita Storm	7"; CD	1999
DHR 29; DHR MCD 29	In Flames (Remix EP)	Hanin Elias	12"; CD	2000
DHR 30; DHR MCD 30	Red Hot Riding Hood	Lolita Storm	7"; CD	2000
DHR 31; DHR MCD 31	Dynamite	EC8OR	12"; CD	2000
DHR 32; DHR MCD 32	Rage	ATR	12"; CD	2000
DHR MCD 33	Sick Slits	Lolita Storm	CD	2001
DHR MCD 34	Kill Life	Fidel Villeneuve	CD	2001
DHR MCD 35; DHR MCD 35 P	Shards of Pol-Pottery: The 2001 Remixes	Alec Empire and El-P	CD; 12"	2001
DHR 36	Digital Hardcore Videos	various	VHS	2001
DHR MCD 38; DHR MCD 38 CD2	Addicted to You	Alec Empire	CD1; CD2	2002
DHR DVD 39	Death Favours the Enemy: Live 2002	Alec Empire	DVD	2002
DHR 40; DHR MCD 40; DHR MCD 40 CD2	The Ride	Alec Empire	12"; CD1; CD2	2002
DHR MCD 41	Eat, Drink, Sleep, Think	Motormark	CD	2004
DHR MCD 42	Reach	Panic DHH	CDr	2004
DHR MCD 43	Gotta Get Out!	Alec Empire	CD	2005
DHR 44 ER; DHR MCD 44 ER	Kiss Of Death	Alec Empire	7"; CD	2005

=== Albums ===
Cat No.	Title	Artist	Format	Year
DHR CD 1 DHR LP 1	1995	Atari Teenage Riot	CD; LP	1995
DHR CD 1	Delete Yourself!	Atari Teenage Riot	CD	1995
DHR CD 2 DHR LP 2	Harder Than The Rest	various	CD; 2xLP	1995
DHR CD 3 DHR LP 3	EC8OR (CD/2xLP)	EC8OR	CD; 2xLP	1995
DHR CD 4 DHR LP 4	The Destroyer	Alec Empire	CD; 2xLP	1996
DHR CD 5 DHR LP 5	The Horrible Plans Of Flex Busterman	The Horrible Plans Of Flex Busterman	CD; 2xLP	1997
DHR CD 6 DHR LP 6	The Future of War	Atari Teenage Riot	CD; 2xLP	1997
DHR CD 7 DHR LP 7	Shizuo vs. Shizor	Shizuo	CD; 2xLP	1997
DHR CD 8 DHR LP 8	If You're Into It, I'm Out of It	Christoph de Babalon	CD; 2xLP	1997
DHR CD 9 DHR LP 9	World Beaters	EC8OR	CD; LP	1998
DHR CD 10; DHR LP 10	Riot Zone	various	CD; 2xLP	1997
DHR CD 11; DHR LP 11	Squeeze the Trigger	Alec Empire	CD; 2xLP	1997
DHR CD 12; DHR LP 12	Death Breathing	DJ 6666 featuring The Illegals	CD; 2xLP	1998
DHR CD 14; DHR LP 14	Curse of the Golden Vampire	Curse of the Golden Vampire	CD; 2xLP	1998
DHR CD 15; DHR LP 15	Field Manual	Bomb 20	CD; 2xLP	1998
DHR CD 16; DHR LP 16	The Destroyer	Alec Empire	CD; 2xLP	1998
DHR CD 17	You've Got The Fucking Power	various	CD	1998
DHR CD 18; DHR LP 18	Cobra Killer	Cobra Killer	CD; LP	1998
DHR CD 19; DHR LP 19	Too Bad But True	Fever	CD; LP	1998
DHR CD 20; DHR LP 20	60 Second Wipe Out	Atari Teenage Riot	CD; 2xLP	1999
DHR CD 2021; DHR LP 2021	60 Second Wipe Out/ Live in Philadelphia Dec. 1997	Atari Teenage Riot	2xCD; 3xLP	1999
DHR CD 21; DHR LP 21	Live in Philadelphia Dec. 1997	Atari Teenage Riot	CD; LP	1999
DHR CD 22; DHR LP 22	In Flames (1995–1999)	Hanin Elias	CD; LP	1999
DHR CD 23; DHR LP 23	Girls Fucking Shit Up	Lolita Storm	CD; LP	2000
DHR LP 24	Hitler2000	Patric Catani	2xLP	2000
DHR CD 25	60 Second Wipe Out	Atari Teenage Riot	Enhanced CD	2000
DHR CD 26	Attitude PC8	Patric Catani	CD	2000
DHR CD 27; DHR LP 27	The One and Only High and Low	EC8OR	CD; LP	2000
DHR CD 28	Live at Brixton Academy	Atari Teenage Riot	CD; LP	2000
DHR CD 29	Intelligence and Sacrifice	Alec Empire	2xCD	2002
DHR CD 30	In Flames (1995–1999)	Hanin Elias	Enhanced CD	2000
DHR CD 31	DIY-Fest	various	CD	2001
DHR CD 33	Don't F**k With Us	various	3xCD	2002
DHR CD 34	Redefine the Enemy!	Atari Teenage Riot	CD	2002
DHR CD 38	Burn, Berlin, Burn!	Atari Teenage Riot	CD	2003
DHR CD 39	Panic Drives Human Herds	Panic DHH	CD	2004
DHR CD 40 ER	Futurist	Alec Empire	CD	2005
DHR CD 41	Chrome Tape	Motormark	CD	2004
DHR CD 42; DHR LP 42	Atari Teenage Riot: 1992-2000	Atari Teenage Riot	CD; 2xLP	2006
DHR CD 43	Is This Hyperreal?	Atari Teenage Riot	CD	2011
DHR CD 44	Riot In Japan 2011	Atari Teenage Riot	CD	2012
DHR CD 45	Reset	Atari Teenage Riot	CD	2015

=== DHR Limited series ===
Cat No.	Title	Artist	Format	Year
DHR LTD CD 001; DHR LTD 001	Funk Riot Beat	Death Funk	CD; LP	1997
DHR LTD MCD 002; DHR LTD 002	No Safety Pin Sex E.P.	Alec Empire	CD; 12"	1997
DHR LTD MCD 003; DHR LTD 003	Snuff Out	Patric Catani	CD; 12"	1997
DHR LTD MCD 004; DHR LTD 004	Fuck Step '98	Shizuo	CD; LP	1998
DHR LTD CD 005; DHR LTD 005	Black Ark	Carl Crack	CD; LP	1998
DHR LTD MCD 006; DHR LTD 006	100 DPS	Patric Catani	CD; LP	1998
DHR LTD MCD 007; DHR LTD 007	Live at the Suicide Club 8-7-95	Sonic Subjunkies	CD; 12"	1998
DHR LTD CD 008; DHR LTD 008	We Punk Einheit!	Nintendo Teenage Robots	CD; 2xLP	1999
DHR LTD CD 009; DHR LTD 009	Miss Black America	Alec Empire	CD; LP	1999
DHR LTD 010	Gimme Nyquil All Night Long/I Won't Pay	EC8OR	7"	2000
DHR LTD 11	Clear and Present Danger Vol. 1: Digital Hardcore Recordings vs Invisible Records	various	CD	2001
DHR LTD CD 12	DHR LTD12 CD	various	CD	2000
DHR LTD CD 011	Bleeding in Circles	Heartworm	CD	2002
DHR LTD CD 012	Live CBGB's NYC 1998	Alec Empire vs. Merzbow	CD	2003
DHR LTD CD 014	The CD2 Sessions	Alec Empire	CD	2003
DHR LTD CD 015	Introduction to Global Stupidity	Tuareg Geeks	CDr	2005

=== DHR online shop exclusives ===
Cat No.	Title	Artist	Format	Year
DHR MAIL 1	Live At CBGB's New York City 4-11-98	Alec Empire	CDr	2004
DHR MAIL 10	The Destroyer Mix Tape #3/98	Alec Empire	CDr	2004
DHR MAIL 11	The Destroyer Mix Tape #4/04	Alec Empire	CDr	2004
DHR MAIL 12	Live At The Suicide Club 1995	Alec Empire	CDr	2006

=== DHR official tape series ===
Cat No.	Title	Artist	Format	Year
DHR OTS 000001	Live in Stuttgart (One-Off Shit Let's Go!)	Atari Teenage Riot	cassette	1996
DHR OTS 000010	Noise, Dropouts and No Music	Kill:Out Trash	cassette	1996
DHR OTS 000011	Killed by Lies	Test Tube Kid	cassette	1996

== See also ==
- List of record labels
- List of electronic music record labels
