= LustSickPuppy =

American rapper, artist and model (born 1997)

- Born: January 2, 1997 (age 29); New York City, U.S.
- Other name: Tommy Hayes
- Occupations: Rapper; painter; make-up artist; model
- Years active: 2017–present
- Musical career
- Genres: Digital hardcore; hip hop
- Instrument: Vocals

Tommy Hayes (born January 2, 1997), known professionally as LustSickPuppy (sometimes stylized as Lust$ickPuppy), is an American rapper, painter, make-up artist, and model. Their (Note: Hayes uses they/them pronouns.) debut extended play, Cosmic Brownie, was released in 2020, and their second EP, As Hard As You Can, was released in 2022. Their self-released and self-produced debut studio album, Carousel from Hell, was released in 2024. Their music has been described as genre-bending, featuring a fusion of digital hardcore with genres such as hip hop, breakcore, and harsh noise.

== Life and career ==
Tommy Hayes was born on January 2, 1997 in Crown Heights, Brooklyn, where they were also raised. As a child, they wrote raps and attended rap cyphers. Hayes has described themself during their youth as "a raw ass kid growing up too fast". While teaching prosthetic makeup at a middle school, Hayes began working professionally as a painter and make-up artist in 2017, also working as a model.

Hayes released their debut single as LustSickPuppy, "Goatmeal", and an accompanying music video in May 2020, which preceded their debut extended play, Cosmic Brownie, released on June 1, 2020. Their single "BustDuster" was released in July 2021. In 2022, they toured as an opening act, first for Dorian Electra and later for Machine Girl, and released their second EP, As Hard As You Can. After it was announced in March 2024, their self-produced first studio album, Carousel from Hell, was released on April 26 of the same year. It was preceded by the singles "Blisster", "Chokehold", and "Exes".

== Artistry ==
For Vogue, Janelle Okwodu described Hayes's art as "impulsive, convoluted, and chaotic". They frequently wear smiley or juggalo-inspired clown face paint while performing. Hayes based their stage name on their Instagram username, which they had put "no real thought" into until they started to perform music.

Hayes has described their music as "pretty genre-less" and has called their combination of genres "genrefucking". Raphael Helfand of The Fader described their music as "a combination of hellacious beats and cracked, unhinged vocals" and described their "sex-crazed-canine persona" as having "an extremely specific self-mythology". For the Chicago Reader, Micco Caporale described their music as "a perfect marriage between club-kid uncanniness and Juggalo attitude"; Leah Mandel, for Pitchfork, wrote that their music "typically exerts a hyper-confident lusty indignation" and "always [has] humor". Their music is largely digital hardcore and hip hop and also has elements of heavy metal, jungle, breakcore, nu metal, harsh noise, and electronic music. They have cited Missy Elliott as an influence on their music and image.

== Discography ==
=== Albums ===
List of albums, with release date and label shown
Title	Details
Carousel from Hell	Released: April 26, 2024; Label: Self-released; Format: Digital download, streaming

=== Extended plays ===
List of extended plays, with release date and label shown
Title	Details
Cosmic Brownie	Released: June 1, 2020; Label: Self-released; Format: Digital download, streaming
As Hard As You Can	Released: January 21, 2022; Label: Self-released; Format: Digital download, streaming

=== Singles ===
List of singles as lead artist with title, year, and album
Title	Year	Album
"Goatmeal"	2020	Cosmic Brownie
"Thirst" (with Bonnie Baxter)	2021	Non-album singles
"Bustduster"	2021	Non-album singles
"Ego Bruiser"	2021	As Hard As You Can
"Might B"	2022	Non-album singles
"Ride It" (with Machine Girl)	2023	Non-album singles
"Chokehold"	2023	Carousel from Hell
"Exes"	2024	Carousel from Hell
"Blisster"	2024	Carousel from Hell

=== Guest appearances ===
Title	Year	Artist(s)	Album
"Suck Shit"	2020	Machine Girl, Rafia	U-Void Synthesizer
"Amnesia"	2021	Death Tour, Ghoulavelii, Kamiyada+, Prxjek, WhoKilledXIX	Scared? (0.5)
"Creepy Crawlers"	2023	Tripp Jones, Loko Los	Gladiator Season, Vol. 3
