= Rowdy Superstar =

- Origin: London, England
- Genres: Rap, electronica, experimental
- Years active: 2008–present
- Label: Accidental Records
- Member of: Atari Teenage Riot

Rowdy Superstar is an English singer-rapper and record producer. He often performs with the dance duo the Hype Girls. He is also a member of Atari Teenage Riot.

== Biography ==
Rowdy Superstar gained much attention with the release of a video for "Tick Tock" on YouTube. His following grew as he performed with Patrick Wolf in 2009 and toured with him as a support act in 2011.

Rowdy Superstar's debut single release was "Get UR Shizzit Riiiiight" on 7 inch vinyl format released in April 2011. His debut album Battery was released in November 2012 on Accidental Records. Matthew Herbert co-produced the record.

== Discography ==
Single:

- 2011 - "Get UR Shizzit Riiiiight"

Albums:

- 2012 - Battery
