= Destroy 2000 Years of Culture =

Single by Atari Teenage Riot

from the album The Future of War
- B-side: "Paranoid"; "You Can't Hold Us Back"
- Released: 15 December 1997
- Recorded: 1996
- Genre: Digital hardcore, industrial metal, rap rock
- Length: 3:51
- Label: Digital Hardcore Recordings; Intercord Tonträger GmbH
- Songwriter: Alec Empire
- Producer: Alec Empire

Atari Teenage Riot singles chronology
"Sick to Death" (1997)	"Destroy 2000 Years of Culture" (1997)	"Atari Teenage Riot II" (1999)

Destroy 2000 Years of Culture is a song by Atari Teenage Riot, released as the fourth and final single from their 1997 album The Future of War. The single was released as a 12" vinyl record and as a limited edition CD, with only 500 copies made. The CD edition contains an unlisted hidden track: An instrumental version of the B-side "Paranoid".

== Overview ==
The track revolves around a sample of the track "Dead Skin Mask" by Slayer, from their 1990 album Seasons in the Abyss. It also contains rapping by Alec Empire.

A music video was produced for the track, which shows Alec Empire rapping against grainy, highly saturated footage with a metal device in his neck. Also shown are brief clips of fellow band members Carl Crack and Hanin Elias standing in front of an what appears to be an apocalyptic setting.

== Track listing ==
Side A
No.	Title	Length
1.	"Destroy 2000 Years of Culture"	3:51
2.	"Paranoid"	3:00

Side B
No.	Title	Length
1.	"Destroy 2000 Years of Culture" (Remix)	4:24
2.	"You Can't Hold Us Back"	3:59

== Personnel ==
- Alec Empire – production, writing
- Hanin Elias – writing
- Steve Rooke – mastering
- Henni Hell – cover artwork
