= The Singing Kettle News =

- Created by: Adrian Edwards
- Opening theme: Gary Coupland MBE
- Country of origin: United Kingdom
- Original language: English
- No. of series: 4

Production
- Producer: Kettle Productions
- Running time: 10–15 minutes
- Production company: Scottish Television

Original release
- Network: ITV (CITV)
- Release: 11 September 1995 – 4 December 2000

The Singing Kettle News is a BAFTA award-winning children's series that run on CITV. The show starred The Singing Kettle, a children's group who are well known for performing traditional children's songs with a distinctly Scottish flair.

== About the series ==
In total, four series were created comprising 37 x 10 min episodes. The aim of the show was to meet the deadline set by 'Mr Editor' and create front-page news. The Singing Kettle had to find lead stories for 'kettle News' by singing songs and telling stories. Each episode contained Two songs, from series Two onwards, The audience of children could be seen unlike the first series where they were just heard. In series One, the famous rhyme was used at the end shortly before the closing credits in each episode, to retrieve the newspapers that had been put together that episode. In series Two, the opening theme was shortened and the rhyme was re-introduced at the start, panning across the audience. A stage was also introduced for the Singing Kettle to perform on. The tag-line 'Let's Sing all about it' was also introduced and used at the end of each episode before running on to the stage to sing.

From Series Three the series title was shortened to just The Singing Kettle, with new music and theme that included a shortened version of the Kettle's signature song 'What's Inside The Singing Kettle' concluding with the famous rhyme. The opening titles panned across the audience onto the stage where the team were then introduced. Cilla, Artie and Jane then sung an extended edition of the famous rhyme while Gary played.

== Episodes ==
- Series One contained 6 Episodes – 1996
- Series Two Contained 5 Episodes – 1997
- Series Three Contained 13 Episodes – 1998
- Series Four Contained 13 Episodes – 2000

In 2016, the series produced for Scottish Television began airing on STV Glasgow and STV Edinburgh as part of their 'Wean's World' children's programming strand.

== Video Tapes ==
- The Singing Kettle
- Sing All About It
- Daly News
- The Best Of The Singing Kettle

== See also ==
- Music of Scotland
