= Singalong Songs from Scotland =

Singalong Songs From Scotland

Compilation album by The Singing Kettle
- Released: 2003
- Recorded: 2003
- Genre: Children
- Length: 51:10
- Label: Smithsonian Folkways Recordings
- Producer: Artie Trezise and Stephanie Smith

The Singing Kettle chronology
Medieval Madness	Singalong Songs From Scotland

The Singing Kettle: Singalong Songs From Scotland is a record containing 17 children’s songs. This is The Singing Kettle's first recording to be widely distributed outside the United Kingdom. The songs are performed by Cilla Fisher, Artie Trezise and Gary Coupland. Also joining in on this recording are Kevin MacLeod and Jane Fisher.

== Performer credits ==
- Artie Trezise - Guitar, Vocals, Arranger, Compilation, Compilation Mastering, Photography, Producer
- Cilla Fisher - Vocals
- Gary Coupland - Keyboards, Harmony Vocals, Saxophone
- Kevin MacLeod - Vocals, Voices
- Jane Fisher - Vocals
- Norman Chalmers - Vocals, Whistle (Human)
- Gregor Reid - Autoharp
- John McGlynn - Drums
- Stuart Anderson - Accordion, Keyboards
- Allan Barty - Fiddle, Mandolin
- Lindsay Porteous - Jew's-Harp
- Mark Murphy - Bass

== Production credits ==
- Roy Ashby - Engineer
- Robin Morton -Engineer
- Dan Sheehy - Production Supervisor
- Pete Reiniger -Compilation Mastering
- Mary Monseur - Production Coordination
- Carla Borden - Editorial Assistant
- Stephanie Smith - Producer, Liner Notes, Annotation, Compilation
- D. A. Sonneborn - Production Supervisor
- John W. Young - Photography
- Caroline Brownell - Design, Illustrations

== Track listing ==
1. "Three Craws"
2. "Aiken Drum"
3. "Picnic Treat" (P. Trezise/Gary Coupland)
4. "Ten in the Bed"
5. "No Pyjamas On" (Ewan McVicar)
6. "Buy Me a Banana"
7. "Down on the Funny Farm (P. Trezise/Gary Coupland)
8. "Bunny Fou Fou" (Artie Trezise)
9. "The Green Grass Grew All Around"
10. "Air Guitar" (P. Kennedy)
11. "Opposites"
12. "Apples and Bananas"
13. "Five Wee Monkeys
14. "The Ants Went Marching"
15. "My Boy's a Cowboy
16. "Boa Constrictor" (Shel Silverstein)
17. "Friends Like You" (Jane Fisher/P. Trezise/Gary Coupland)
