= Down's Syndrome Scotland =

Scottish charity

Down's Syndrome Scotland is a registered charity in Scotland that works to improve the quality of life for people with Down syndrome. The charity has been registered in Scotland since 1982. Members include people with Down syndrome, families, and professionals. The charity provides information, support and advice.

== Services ==
Down's Syndrome Scotland provides information, and publishes leaflets and other publications. It has six local branches where people work with teachers, doctors, and other professionals. They also host events, workshops, and training.
