= Delete Yourself! =

Studio album by Atari Teenage Riot
- Released: 1 March 1995
- Studios: Empire, Berlin; Roundhouse, London
- Genres: Digital hardcore; breakcore; breakbeat
- Length: 46:55
- Labels: Digital Hardcore (Europe); Grand Royal (USA)
- Producers: Alec Empire, David Harrow

Atari Teenage Riot chronology
| Delete Yourself! (1995) | The Future of War (1997) |

Singles from Delete Yourself!
- 1. "Atari Teenage Riot" Released: 1993; 2. "Kids Are United" Released: 1993; 3. "Speed/Midijunkies" Released: April 1995

Original cover
- Original artwork for Delete Yourself!, originally titled 1995.

Professional ratings
Review scores
| Source | Rating |
|---|---|
| AllMusic | 2.5/5 stars |

Delete Yourself! is the debut album by German digital hardcore band Atari Teenage Riot.

The song "Speed" was used in the 2006 film The Fast and the Furious: Tokyo Drift.

== Track listing ==
All tracks are written by Alec Empire, except where noted.

| No. | Title | Writer(s) | Length |
|---|---|---|---|
| 1. | "Start the Riot!" | | 3:40 |
| 2. | "Into the Death" | | 3:26 |
| 3. | "Raverbashing" | | 3:26 |
| 4. | "Speed" | | 2:48 |
| 5. | "Sex" | | 3:33 |
| 6. | "Midijunkies" | | 5:15 |
| 7. | "Delete Yourself! (You Got No Chance to Win!)" (Live in Glasgow, 17.10.1993) | | 4:37 |
| 8. | "Hetzjagd Auf Nazis!" (Live in Berlin, 25.2.1994) | | 5:16 |
| 9. | "Cyberpunks Are Dead!" | | 3:35 |
| 10. | "Kids Are United" | Empire, Jimmy Pursey | 3:36 |
| 11. | "Atari Teenage Riot" | Empire, Carl Crack | 3:38 |
| 12. | "Riot 1995" | | 4:01 |
| Total length: | | | 46:55 |

2012 Remastered Edition Bonus Tracks
| No. | Title | Length |
|---|---|---|
| 13. | "Atari Teenage Riot" (1st Studio Recording) | 3:09 |
| 14. | "Children of a New Breed" | 3:32 |
| 15. | "Riot Machine" | 5:25 |
| Total length: | | 59:00 |

== Samples ==
- "Into the Death" samples Thanatos' "Bodily Dismemberment"
- "Speed" samples Powermad's "Slaughterhouse"
- "Atari Teenage Riot" samples Nirvana's song "Smells Like Teen Spirit"
- "Riot 1995" samples Dinosaur Jr.'s "Sludgefeast"
- "Delete Yourself! (You Got No Chance to Win!)" samples the Sex Pistols' "God Save the Queen"

== Personnel ==
Atari Teenage Riot

- Alec Empire – vocals, programming
- Hanin Elias – vocals
- Carl Crack – MC

Additional

- Berlin and London Rioters – shouting vocals
- Alec Empire – producer (tracks 1 to 3, 7 to 9, and 11 to 12)
- David Harrow – producer (tracks 4 to 6 and 10)
- Alan Branch – engineer
- Henni Hell – cover art
- Phillipp Virus – band photography
- Mathias Sander – live photography
