= Motormark =

Scottish electronic punk band

- Origin: Kirkcaldy, Scotland
- Genres: Electropunk; Digital Hardcore; Electroclash
- Years active: 2001–2007
- Label: Popchild Records
- Past members: Jane Fisher; Mark Law
- Website: www.motormark.net

Motormark were a Scottish electronic punk band formed in 2001. In early 2007 Motormark split up and members Jane and Marko founded a new band with two new members called FANGS. The band consisted of Jane Fisher (stage name Jane Motoro) and Mark Law (stage name Marko Poloroid).

== Biography ==
Jane was in folk singing group, The Singing Kettle, with her parents Cilla and Artie. In 2001, she left to form Motormark with Mark Law, whose mother was a bass player with a Polish rock band.

Too Pure suggest they release some Motormark singles. Their Ramones sampler 'Lets Go' was released on Jane's birthday, the same day Joey Ramone died, and NME dubbed it as 'nauseating'.

== Discography ==
=== Albums ===
- pop:up (2001)
- Chrome Tape (2004)

=== Singles ===
- Eat, Drink, Sleep, Think (2004)
- Note To Self (2006)

=== Samplers ===
- Let's Go (2001)

== FANGS ==
FANGS
- Origin: Glasgow, Scotland
- Genres: Electropunk; Digital Hardcore; Electroclash
- Years active: 2007–present
- Label: Popchild Records
- Members: Queen; JoJo Doll; Lloyd Alex; Marko Nein
- Website: www.wearefangs.com

FANGS are a touring punk band.

Mark is in the group under the name Marko Nein. Jane is using the name Queen. Lloyd Alex on Synth and Jojo Doll on drums.

Lloyd Alex founded Glasgow electronic trio BabyBones with Greg Cossar and Margret Maclean in 2005.

=== Discography ===
Albums

- Automatic Rocknroll (2011)
