= Shizuo =

- Gender: Male

Origin
- Origin: Japanese
- Meaning: Different meanings depending on the kanji used

Shizuo (written: 静夫, 静雄, 静男, 倭夫 or 鎮雄) is a masculine Japanese given name. Notable people with the name include:

- Shizuo Akira (審良 静男; born 1953), Japanese immunologist
- Amanoyama Shizuo (天ノ山 静雄; 1953–1997), Japanese sumo wrestler
- Shizuo Fujieda (藤枝 静男; 1907–1993), Japanese writer
- Fujimori Shizuo (藤森 静雄; 1891–1943), Japanese printmaker
- Shizuo Imaizumi (今泉 鎮雄; born 1938), Japanese aikidoka
- Shizuo Kakutani (角谷 静夫; 1911–2004), Japanese-born American mathematician
- Shizuo Miyama (深山 静夫), Japanese footballer
- Shizuo Mochizuki (望月 倭夫; 1909–?), Japanese pole vaulter
- Nayoroiwa Shizuo (名寄岩 静男; 1914–1971), Japanese sumo wrestler
- Shizuo Takada (高田 静夫; born 1947), Japanese footballer and referee
- Shizuo Takada (athlete) (高田 静雄; 1909–1963), Japanese shot putter
- Shizuo Yada (矢田 静雄; born 1948), Japanese sport wrestler
- Shizuo Yokoyama (横山 静雄; 1890–1961), Japanese general
