= Nic Endo =

Japanese-German-American noise musician

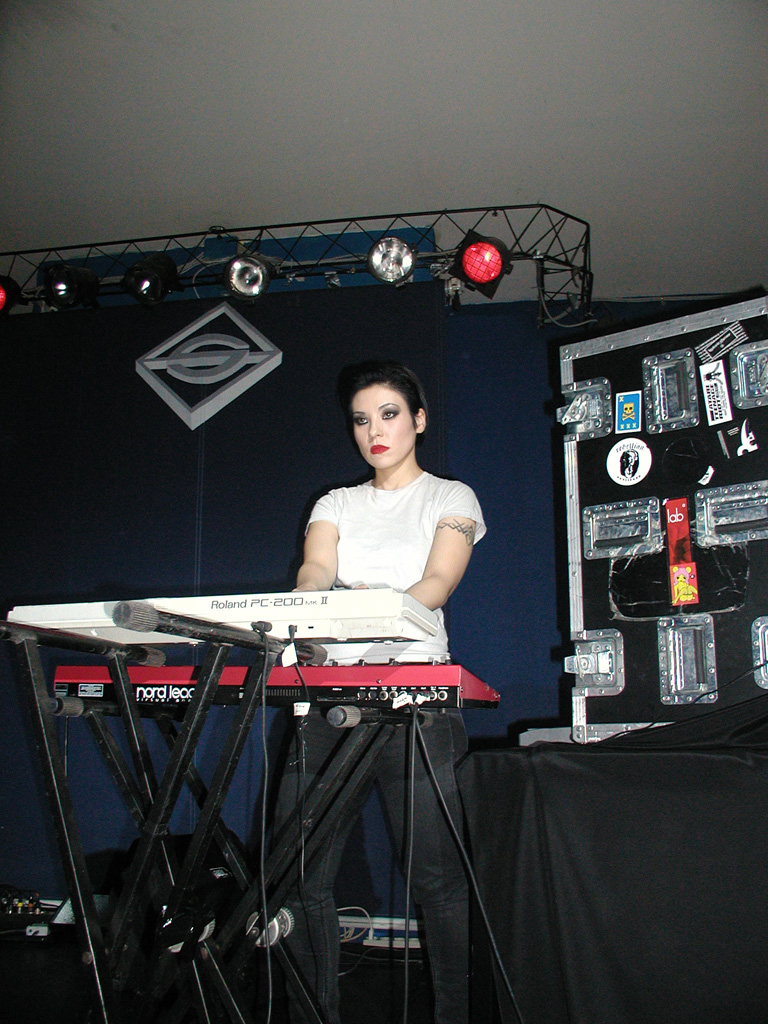

Background information
- Born: January 7, 1976 (age 50); Wichita Falls, Texas, U.S.
- Origin: Frankfurt, Germany
- Genres: Digital hardcore, noise, breakcore, hardcore techno
- Member of: Atari Teenage Riot

Nicole "Nic" Endo (born January 7, 1976) is a German noise musician who plays with the German digital hardcore group Atari Teenage Riot. The daughter of a Japanese mother and a German father, Endo was born in Wichita Falls, Texas.

== Background ==
Endo lived in Frankfurt from 1994 to 1996 and later moved to Berlin. Nic Endo joined ATR while they were on tour in 1997 and was involved with the production of their album 60 Second Wipe Out.

After ATR effectively broke up in 2000, Endo released an experimental solo album entitled Cold Metal Perfection through Fatal Recordings, an explicitly feminist offshoot of Digital Hardcore Recordings. It was named as one of the top 20 albums of 2001 by Alternative Press.

In 2001, Endo assisted in the production of Alec Empire's solo album, Intelligence and Sacrifice. She has also since been a part of Empire's touring band, and she was also involved with his follow-up album Futurist (2005). In 2010, ATR reformed, and Endo replaced Hanin Elias as the band's female vocalist. Her trademark style is her black leather and white face paint overlaid by the characters 抵抗, meaning "resistance".

== Influences ==
Endo has spoken about her appreciation for Alice Coltrane, James Chance, Miles Davis, Jimi Hendrix, Destroy All Monsters, Freddie Hubbard, Led Zeppelin, Maya Deren, John Coltrane, Brainticket, the Velvet Underground, the Doors, Neu!, and Sun Ra.

== Discography ==
- White Heat (EP) (DHR, 1998)
- Poison Lips (as She Satellites) (Geist, 1998)
- Cold Metal Perfection (DHR Fatal, 2001)
