= ATR (song) =

Single by Atari Teenage Riot

from the album Delete Yourself!
- B-side: "Midijunkies"
- Released: 1993
- Label: Phonogram; Vertigo
- Songwriter(s): A Wilke, C Crack, K Boehm
- Producer(s): Alec Empire

Atari Teenage Riot singles chronology
"ATR" (1993)	"Raver Bashing" (1994)

"ATR" ("Atari Teenage Riot") is a song by Atari Teenage Riot, released as their first single in 1993. It was later included on their debut album Delete Yourself!.

== Track listings ==
CD version

1. "ATR"
2. "ATR" (Urban Riot Mix)
3. "Midi Junkies"
4. "Midi Junkies" (Berlin Mix)

Cassette version

1. "ATR" - 3:09
2. "ATR" (Urban Riot Mix) - 3:08
3. "Midi Junkies" - 5:02
4. "Midi Junkies" (Berlin Mix) - 6:20
5. "ATR" (Radio Bleep Version) - 3:09

12" vinyl

- Side A
  1. "ATR"
  2. "ATR" (Urban Riot Mix)
- Side B
  1. "Midi Junkies"
  2. "Midi Junkies" (Berlin Mix)

12" vinyl promo

- Side A
  - "ATR" (Urban Riot Mix)
- Side B
  - "Midijunkies" (Berlin Mix)
