= Atari Teenage Riot =

German digital hardcore band

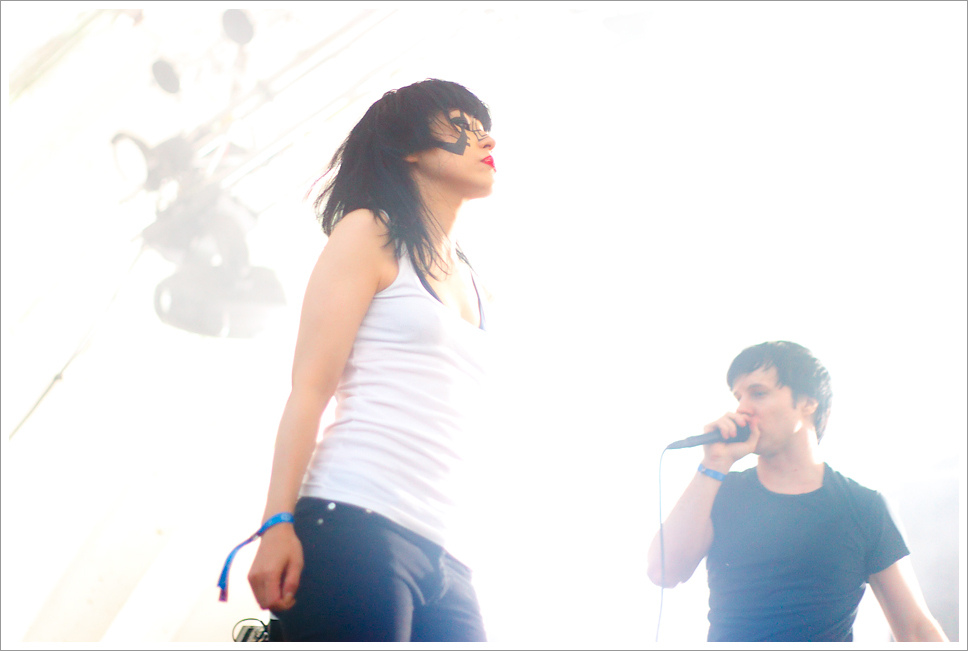
- Nic Endo and Alec Empire performing at Fusion Festival in 2010

Background information
- Origin: Berlin, Germany
- Genre: Digital hardcore • industrial
- Years active: 1992–2000, 2010–present
- Labels: Digital Hardcore, Phonogram, Grand Royal, Dim Mak
- Members: Alec Empire; Nic Endo; Rowdy Superstar
- Past members: Hanin Elias; Carl Crack; CX KiDTRONiK

Atari Teenage Riot (ATR) is a German band formed in Berlin in 1992. Highly political, they fuse anarchist and anti-fascist views with punk vocals and a techno sound called digital hardcore, which is a term band member Alec Empire used as the name of his record label Digital Hardcore Recordings. After a long hiatus in 2000, they re-formed in 2010.

== History ==
Atari Teenage Riot was founded as an attack on the Neo-Nazi subculture by fusing hardcore punk views with German techno; it consisted of three Berliners—Alec Empire, Hanin Elias and MC Carl Crack. ATR's early releases (which included the track "Hetzjagd Auf Nazis!"/"Hunt Down the Nazis!") were surrounded by controversy in Germany.

After signing to major European label Phonogram Records in 1993, the band received a large financial advance which they duplicitously used to set up their own record label: Digital Hardcore Recordings (DHR). ATR never delivered a commercially viable demo to Phonogram.

The major label Intercord signed the group in 1995 for Germany. ATR's record label Digital Hardcore Recordings released the debut album Delete Yourself! internationally. In 1996 the Beastie Boys licensed the album and released it in the US with extra songs under the title Burn Berlin Burn on their label Grand Royal.

The band toured in 1997 with Wu-Tang Clan, Rage Against the Machine, Nine Inch Nails, Ministry, Moby and Beck because of the success of their album Burn Berlin Burn.

In 1996, ATR was joined by Nic Endo, a noise/soundscape artist, who played her first live show with ATR in the spring of 1997 during the South by Southwest festival in Austin, Texas.

In 1999, ATR released the album 60 Second Wipe Out, which featured a number of guest artists, including rappers The Arsonists. According to Magnet, "Empire's guitar-playing values speed-thrash malevolence, and when paired with Endo's painful skronkage, the album is decidedly denser than its predecessor".

That year the band were arrested in Berlin for "inciting violence" during a performance at a protest against the NATO bombing of Yugoslavia. Conflicts began between the 30,000-strong crowd of protestors and police while the band played their song "Revolution Action."

Elias left ATR at the Brixton Academy show in the winter of 1999. The plan had been to tour with Nine Inch Nails in the US during the spring of 2000, but ATR decided to cancel the show to recharge. Crack also needed time to recuperate from his psychosis attacks.

In the autumn of 2000, ATR started working on their fourth album. The song "Rage", featuring Tom Morello from Rage Against the Machine, was chosen as an in-between single until the release of the fourth album. "Rage" was part of the recording sessions for 60 Second Wipe Out, but Empire did not feel it would fit the album.

On 6 September 2001, Crack, who had long struggled with psychiatric issues, died from an overdose of unspecified pills. The media hype surrounding Crack's death is disputed by ATR. According to a friend, a few weeks before his death he had spoken about a doctor's report which said his psychosis attacks would worsen with age. According to that friend, Crack said he would rather kill himself than become a "zombie" and not be in control of his life. Witnesses have said Crack tried to reach out to his friends because he felt the psychosis starting again. When his body was found by police with large quantities of medication in his stomach, this suggested suicide. It is still unclear if this happened while he was in a state of psychosis or not (while in a psychotic state, it could be interpreted as an accident rather than suicide).

The other half of the band continue to work together. Endo assisted in the production of Empire's solo recordings, as well as being a key member of his live band. DHR released Atari Teenage Riot: 1992–2000, a collection of the band's best known recordings, on 3 July 2006.

=== Reformation ===
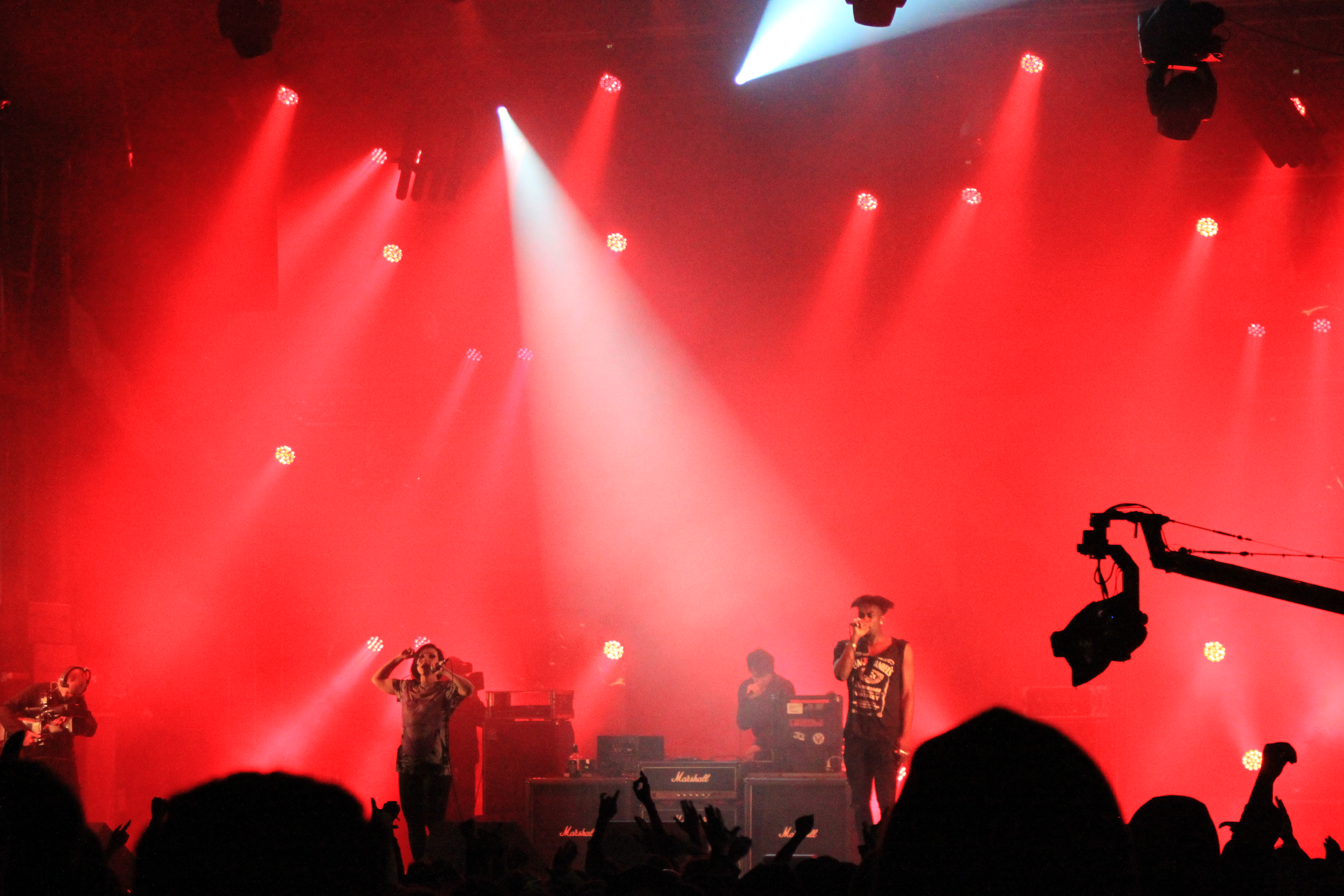
A.T.R. (in French), Hellfest 2013

In October 2009, Elias contacted Empire, proposing they play a few shows together. However, Empire was not interested in continuing the collaboration, explaining that Elias had to withdraw due to vocal problems. Elias herself denies having vocal issues, as she was recording a new album, Get It Back, at the time.

In January 2010, it was announced ATR would reunite for a few live shows in Europe. Later in the year, they announced additional shows in Europe, North America and Asia. In early March 2010, Empire released the new ATR track "Activate" via SoundCloud, which is the first song featuring their new MC, CX KiDTRONiK. "Activate" was recorded on 3 March 2010 in Berlin at the Hellish Vortex Studios. Female vocals were provided by Endo.

The band played most major festivals throughout Europe in 2010, including Reading and Leeds, and headlined the Fusion Festival in front of approximately 20,000 people. In the same year, ATR headlined a stage at Japan's Summersonic Festival, returning the following year to play at Fuji Rock Festival. The band had the headline slot on the electronic stage at the Berlin Festival, which is held at an old military airport in the centre of the city. Enthused, the band decided to add more dates. The live line-up of ATR, as of June 2011, consisted of Empire, Endo and CX KiDTRONiK.

On 12 October 2010, Steve Aoki and Dim Mak Records announced the release of Atari Teenage Riot's new single "Activate", with the full-length album Is This Hyperreal? released in 2011. While the record was described as "redundant" by Pitchfork Media, in what Empire called "probably one of the dumbest reviews I've ever read about any record.", other magazines gave it great reviews. New Musical Express wrote: "Few bands have ever detonated as powerfully in the underground as Atari Teenage Riot. Put simply, they were the conscience of electronic music. They were a band that sounded the way you always wanted The Prodigy to sound. A band akin to Black Flag if that outfit had existed in an age where every home had a computer. And their influence burned big and bright". Artrocker Magazine put them on the cover in their May 2011 issue and wrote: "Make no mistake, 'Activate' is the most exhilarating, futuristic and punk rock single of the month. (...) ATR aren't like any other band. They're the only group that could have cut a record with Rage Against the Machine and have it be their meekest recording. They're the only group that iTunes have censored on the grounds that their music could create riots! Ten years and several line-up changes makes no difference to tonight's immediate onslaught of rave, punk, screaming and pounding gabba. The finale consists of the fiercest white noise squall of the evening, and the audience's reaction (moshing, screaming, crowdsurfing, shoes flying through the air) seems to indicate they don't care either". That month the band headlined the Bang Face Weekender festival in the UK.

Their album Is This Hyperreal? was celebrated as "the ultimate protest album of the google age," dealing with WikiLeaks, Anonymous, hackers, the freedom the internet brought to the suppressed, censorship, the surveillance state, cyber terrorism and digital decay, a term which describes the disaffected masses abandoning the internet when they realised that it was not free but infested with government controls. The campaign for Is This Hyperreal? took a turn when the "Black Flags" viral video was taken up by Anonymous whose members and supporters sent in clips from the Occupy Wall Street protests last autumn. Remixes, mash ups and alternate versions created by fans to represent their own dissatisfaction proliferated and captured the mood so accurately it was played in a CNN broadcast to summarise the zeitgeist behind Anonymous' cyber attacks. Dangerous Minds were calling it the first anthem of the Occupy movement: "While personally I would have thought it would be a new act to break through representing a new generation, no-one can doubt ATR’s credentials when it comes to this kind of thing. In fact, maybe in this age of ultra-commodified music it would HAVE to take a more veteran, established act to represent OWS and Anonymous so as to avoid claims of false appropriation? You have to hand it to ATR though; "Black Flags" is a pretty great tune. I'd say it's one of their most accessible yet while retaining all that dark techno-punk scuzzy energy we know and love."

In Spring 2012 the music video for "Black Flags" was nominated for the MTV O Music Awards in the US in the category "Best Protest Song of the Year".

In advance of a December 2016 concert in Tel Aviv, Israel, ATR used Facebook to declare their opposition to the Boycott, Divestment and Sanctions movement, calling it "a support mechanism for Palestinian terrorist groups in their efforts to de-legitimize and ultimately destroy Israel", accusing Seeds of Peace of promoting "anti-Israel activities", and proposing that "working together is the best way to create a better future."

== Band members ==
Current

- Alec Empire – unclean vocals, programming (1992–2000, 2010–present)
- Nic Endo – vocals, samples (1996–2000, 2010–present)
- Rowdy Superstar – MC (2012–present)

Former

- Carl Crack – MC (1992–2000; died 2001)
- Hanin Elias – vocals (1992–2000)
- CX KiDTRONiK – MC (2010–2012)
- Lisa B. - live member, Synths & Backing Shouts (1997)

Timeline

== Discography ==
=== Studio albums ===
- Delete Yourself! (originally titled 1995) (DHR 1995)
- The Future of War (DHR 1997)
- 60 Second Wipe Out (DHR 1999)
- Is This Hyperreal? (DHR 2011)
- Reset (DHR 2014)

=== Compilation albums ===
- Burn, Berlin, Burn! (Grand Royal 1997)
- Redefine the Enemy - Rarities and B-Side Compilation 1992-1999 (DHR 2002)
- Atari Teenage Riot: 1992–2000 (DHR 2006)
- Unreleased Tracks 1991-1994

=== Live albums ===
- Live in Stuttgart (One-Off Shit Let's Go!) (DHR 1996)
- Live in Philadelphia Dec. 1997 (DHR 1998)
- Live at Brixton Academy (DHR 1999)
- Riot in Japan 2011 (DHR 2011)

=== Video ===
- Sixteen Years of Video Material (with Alec Empire) (Monitorpop 2008)

=== Singles/EPs ===
- "ATR" ("Atari Teenage Riot") (Phonogram 1993)
- "Kids Are United E.P." (Phonogram 1993)
- "Raver Bashing" (split with "Together for Never" by Alec Empire) (Riot Beats 1994)
- "Speed/Midijunkies" (DHR 1996)
- "Deutschland Has Gotta Die!" (Grand Royal 1996)
- "Not Your Business E.P." (Grand Royal 1996)
- "Destroy 2000 Years of Culture" (Intercord 1997)
- "Paranoid" (split with "Free Satpal Ram" by Asian Dub Foundation) (Damaged Goods 1997)
- "Sick to Death" (DHR 1997)
- "Atari Teenage Riot II" (DHR 1999)
- "Revolution Action E.P." (DHR 1999)
- "Too Dead for Me EP" (DHR 1999)
- "Rage E.P." (DHR 2000)
- "Activate" (DHR 2010)
- "Blood in My Eyes" (DHR 2011)
- "Black Flags" (DHR 2011)
- "Collapse of History Remixes" (DHR 2012)
- "Collapse of History" (DHR 2012)

=== Other recordings ===
- "No Remorse (I Wanna Die)" with Slayer (Spawn: The Album)
- "Sex Law Penetration" on Orgazmo (Original Motion Picture Soundtrack) (Nickelbag 1998)
