= Carl Crack =

German techno artist

- Born: Karl Böhm; 5 May 1971; Eswatini (then Swaziland)
- Origin: Germany
- Died: 6 September 2001 (aged 30) Berlin, Germany
- Formerly of: Atari Teenage Riot

Carl Crack (born Karl Böhm; 5 May 1971 – 6 September 2001) was a Swazi-born German techno artist best known for his membership in the digital hardcore band Atari Teenage Riot from 1992 to 2000.

== Biography ==
Around 1992, Crack displayed little interest in the music scene as it was at the time. He felt that The Beatnigs (the original vehicle for social and political critic Michael Franti, later of the Disposable Heroes of Hiphoprisy and Spearhead) were one of the few significant bands around. Along with the other members of Atari Teenage Riot he was looking for a new direction.

Crack initially had a significant influence on ATR's style, particularly on the first two albums where he developed an MC style which owed less to the U.S. than his own imagination. He also had his own musical ideas that could not be expressed within the confines of a group, leading to his only solo release, Black Ark, in 1998. It is, as the name suggests, heavily influenced by dub and in particular Lee Perry.

After heavy touring to promote ATR's third album, 60 Second Wipe Out, the members of the group commenced work on follow ups to their various solo projects. Crack appeared on Cobra Killer's 2002 album, The Third Armpit. He also was part of Firewire and Whatever, both with Din-St.

On 6 September 2001, Crack, who had long struggled with psychiatric issues, died at the age of 30 from an overdose of unspecified pills. The media hype surrounding Crack's death is disputed by ATR. According to a friend, a few weeks before his death he had spoken about a doctor's report which said his psychosis attacks would worsen with age. According to that friend, Crack said he would rather kill himself than become a "zombie" and not be in control of his life. Witnesses have said Crack tried to reach out to his friends because he felt the psychosis starting again. When his body was found by police with large quantities of medication in his stomach, this suggested suicide. It is still unclear if this happened while he was in a state of psychosis or not (while in a psychotic state, it could be interpreted as an accident rather than suicide).

== Discography ==
=== Album ===
- Black Ark (DHR Limited 1998)

=== DJ Mix ===
- Lion MC/Dance the Monkey (Midiwar 1995)
