= Hanin Elias =

German industrial/techno artist

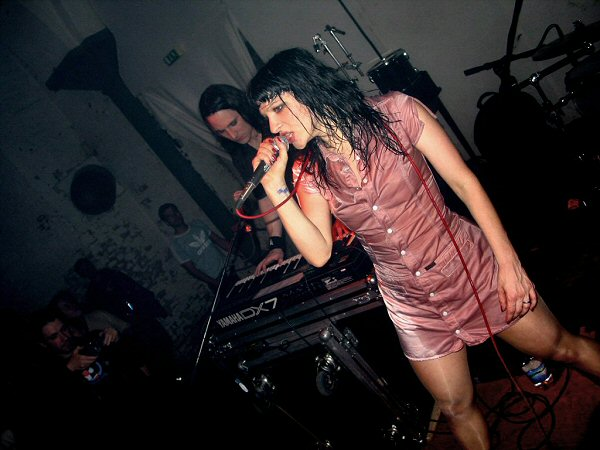
- Elias in 2004

Background information
- Born: 31 May 1972 (age 54); Wittlich, Rhineland-Palatinate, West Germany (now Germany)
- Genres: Industrial; Digital hardcore Techno; Noise
- Years active: 1992–present
- Labels: Fatal Recordings; Digital Hardcore Recordings; Phonogram Records

Hanin Elias (born 31 May 1972) is a Syrian German industrial/techno artist. She was a member of Atari Teenage Riot and is now a solo artist.

After Atari Teenage Riot's non-definitive break in 2000, and the subsequent death of Carl Crack from a drug overdose, the members of ATR split up, and Elias set up her own record label, Fatal Recordings.

== Background ==
Elias was born in Wittlich, Rhineland-Palatinate, Germany to a Syrian father and a German mother and spent three years of her early life living in Syria. A member of a conservative family living under an autocratic father, when the family moved to Berlin she ran away from home and started squatting in the city. Elias started participating in the Berlin punk and goth scenes, developing a musical career and ended up helping to found Atari Teenage Riot.

== Atari Teenage Riot ==
After a brief, unhappy spell with the Phonogram record company, ATR set up their own label, Digital Hardcore Recordings, which became known for its distinctive sound – a hybrid of punk, techno, and heavy metal, also known as digital hardcore.

== Fatal record company ==
After the members of ATR split, Elias' DHR spin-off company, Fatal, went independent, establishing itself in Berlin instead of London. Elias has since released several albums, and her label Fatal has boasted such artists as The Vanishing, Phallus Über Alles, Kunst and Tara Delong. Elias has also performed duets and remixes with such artists as Le Tigre, Thurston Moore, J Mascis, Alexander Hacke, Merzbow, and Alec Empire. In 2005, Elias began working with the industrial project Pigface, joining them on their US tour.

In 2006, it was announced that Fatal Recordings was to close. Elias announced on her MySpace blog that she would be taking an indefinite hiatus from the music industry and relocating to French Polynesia with her family. In 2010, Hanin moved back to Berlin/Germany in order to prepare a new album for 2011.

== New album and comeback ==
In June 2011, the new album Get It Back on Rustblade Recordings was released. In February 2014, Hanin Elias released an album under the name of 'Fantome', with her co-musician Marcel Zürcher who plays guitar and writes songs for Die Krupps. The album was titled It All Makes Sense.

In 2016, her collaboration with the French producer Electrosexual marks the release of the single Hold Me and Automatic People.

== Discography ==
- Parfum EP (Force Inc. 1992)
- Show EP (DHR 1996)
- In Flames (1995–1999) (DHR Fatal 1999)
- "In Flames" EP (DHR Fatal 1999)
- "In Flames" remix EP (DHR Fatal 2000)
- No Games No Fun (Fatal 2003)
- Future Noir (Fatal 2004)
- Get It Back (Rustblade 2011)
- Fatal Box (Limited Edition Box Set. Includes: "Future Noir," "No Games No Fun," Bonus CD of new tracks and remixes, plus postcards, sticker, cameo pin.) (Rustblade 2011)
- Fatal Bag (50-copy Limited Edition Set. Includes: "Get It Back" on CD; "Future Noir" on LP – signed; Bonus CD of new tracks and remixes; plus postcards, sticker, cameo pin, deluxe glass butterfly pendant and earrings; certificate of authenticity.) (Rustblade 2011)
- "Love"/"Fantome" Digital Single including Electrosexual Remix (Snowhite 2014)
- "It All Makes Sense"/"Fantome" (Snowhite 2014)
- "Automatic People" – with electrosexual (Rock Machine Records)
- "Hold Me" /"Kraken" – featuring electrosexual (Fatal Recordings)

== In popular culture ==
Her name appears in the lyrics of the Le Tigre song "Hot Topic."
