= Digital hardcore =

Music genre that melds hardcore punk with electronic music

- Stylistic origins: Hardcore punk; electronic; gabber; drum and bass; breakbeat; techno; EDM; noise; heavy metal; riot grrrl; industrial rock
- Cultural origins: Early 1990s, Germany
- Derivative forms: Cybergrind

Regional scenes
- Europe; United States; Australia

Other topics
- Anarcho-punk; electronicore; electropunk; hardcore techno; industrial metal; noise rock; industrial hardcore; breakcore; sass

Digital hardcore is a fusion genre that combines hardcore punk with electronic dance music genres such as breakbeat, techno, and drum and bass while also drawing on heavy metal, industrial and noise music. It typically features fast tempos and aggressive sound samples. The style was pioneered by Alec Empire of the German band Atari Teenage Riot during the early 1990s, and often has sociological or leftist lyrical themes.

== Characteristics ==
"Locked" by Rabbit Junk
"Locked" by Rabbit Junk demonstrates digital hardcore's signature quick pace, aggressive vocals, breakbeats, and industrial-influence.

Digital hardcore music is typically fast and abrasive, combining the speed, heaviness and attitude of hardcore punk, thrash metal, and riot grrrl with electronic music such as hardcore techno, gabber, jungle, drum and bass, glitch, and industrial rock. Some bands, like Atari Teenage Riot, incorporate elements of hip-hop music, such as freestyle rap.

According to Jeff Terich of Treble Media, digital hardcore is "on the verge of reaching speeds incompatible with popular music, as if the rapid acceleration of BPMs would render the idea of rhythm irrelevant or, at the very least, unpredictable. Maybe this is music for dancing; definitely this is music for screaming and breaking things."

The electric guitar (either real or sampled and usually heavily distorted) is used alongside samplers, synthesizers and drum machines. While the use of electronic instruments is a defining feature of the genre, bass guitars, electric guitars, and drum kits are optional. Vocals are more often shouted than sung by more than one member of the group. Typically, the lyrics are highly politicized and espouse left-wing or anarchist ideals. Some practitioners have been influenced by anarcho-punk.

== History ==
=== 1990s ===
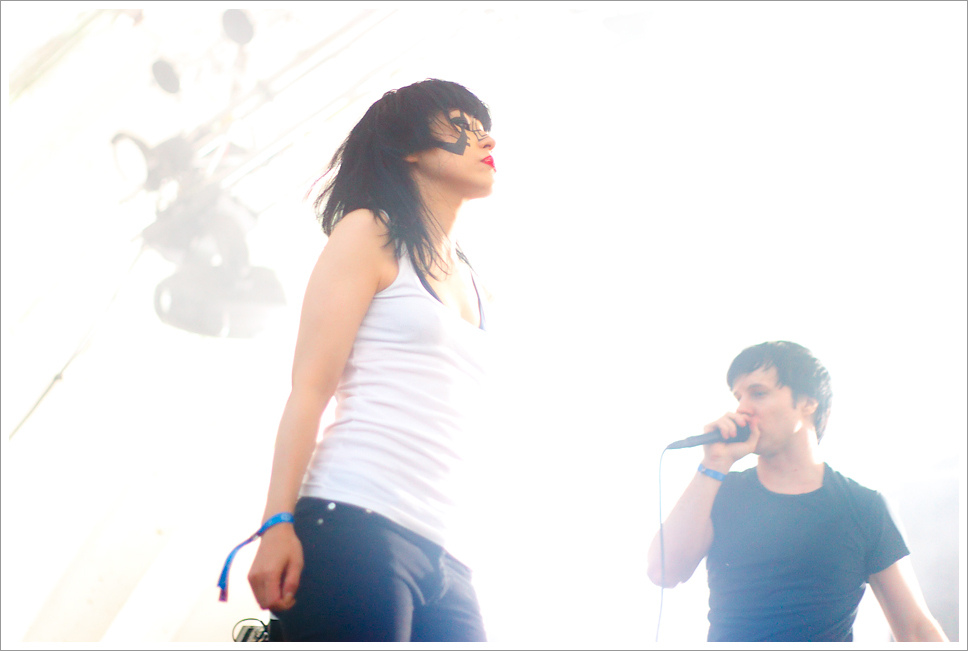
German band Atari Teenage Riot are considered progenitors of the style.

The music was first defined by the band Atari Teenage Riot, who formed in Berlin, Germany in 1992. The band's frontman, Alec Empire, coined the term "digital hardcore," setting up the independent record label Digital Hardcore Recordings in 1994. German bands with a similar style began signing to the label and its underground popularity grew, with small digital hardcore festivals being held in several German cities. By the mid-1990s, a number of new record labels specializing in the genre were formed around the world. These included Gangster Toons Industries (Paris), Praxis (London), Cross Fade Enter Tainment (Hamburg), Drop Bass Network (U.S.), and Bloody Fist (Australia). Digital Hardcore Recordings also had some kinship with the Frankfurt labels Mille Plateaux and Riot Beats. Alec Empire's work subsequently set the template for breakcore.

=== 2000s ===
In Alec Empire's words, "Digital Hardcore went from a local, Berlin based scene to an international underground movement." The soundtrack to the film Threat included contributions from digital hardcore musicians, along with metalcore bands. James Plotkin, Dave Witte and Speedranch's project Phantomsmasher combined digital hardcore with grindcore. Notable 21st century digital hardcore groups include Left Spine Down, Motormark, Death Spells, The Shizit, Rabbit Junk, and Fear, and Loathing in Las Vegas. Additionally, Nine Inch Nails' 2007 studio album Year Zero has been considered as a digital hardcore album as well.

=== 2010s ===
Digital hardcore saw less prominence in the 2010s. However, its international influence can be seen in the prominence of electronicore, a similar musical genre fusing hardcore punk and metalcore with electronica. The German band We Butter the Bread with Butter has seen commercial success employing this fusion. The term "digital hardcore" has largely fallen out of use, given its association with politically charged lyrics, which are not a characteristic of newer electronicore artists.

One notable digital hardcore band to come out of the 2010s was Machine Girl, especially with their 2017 album "...Because I'm Young Arrogant and Hate Everything You Stand For", which combined their earlier modern breakcore style with more extreme hardcore punk vocals. The album Bottomless Pit by experimental hip-hop band Death Grips has been described as digital hardcore.

=== 2020s ===
Coming into the 2020s, digital hardcore has seen a rise with new releases and artists, such as LustSickPuppy, femtanyl, and Lip Critic. Notable mainstream success within the digital hardcore genre has been seen with the British band WARGASM, whose debut EP, Explicit: The Mixxxtape, was released on 9 September 2022; the full-length album Venom was released a year later to critical success.

== See also ==
- Digital Hardcore Recordings
- Breakcore
- Electronicore
- Electropunk
- Cybergrind
- Industrial metal
