= Alec Empire discography =

- Studio albums: 10
- Extended plays: 18
- Live albums: 2
- Compilation albums: 5
- Singles: 8
- Video albums: 2
- Music videos: 9
- DJ mixes: 13

The following is a list of known recordings by or involving Alec Empire, excluding his work with Atari Teenage Riot.

== Alec Empire ==
=== Studio albums ===
Title	Release date	Label
Generation Star Wars	1994	Mille Plateaux
Low on Ice (The Iceland Sessions)	1995	Mille Plateaux
Hypermodern Jazz 2000.5	1996	Mille Plateaux
The Destroyer	1996	DHR
Les Étoiles des Filles Mortes	1996	Mille Plateaux
Miss Black America	1999	DHR
Alec Empire vs. Elvis Presley	1999	El Turco Loco
Intelligence and Sacrifice	2001	DHR
Futurist	2005	DHR
The Golden Foretaste of Heaven	2007	Eat Your Heart Out Records

=== Compilations ===
Title	Release date	Label
Limited Editions 1990-94	1994	Mille Plateaux
Terror Worldwide	1996	DHR Midiwar
Terror Worldwide Pt. 2	1996	DHR Midiwar
Squeeze the Trigger	1997	DHR
The Geist of Alec Empire	1997	Geist Recordings
Bass Terror	2008	Eat Your Heart Out

=== Live albums ===
Title	Release date	Label
Live CBGB's NYC 1998|Alec Empire vs. Merzbow: Live CBGB's NYC 1998	2003	DHR
The CD2 Sessions: Live in London 7-12-2002	2003	DHR

=== EPs ===
Title	Release date	Label
Trip Men EP (with T.N.I.)	1991	Force Inc.
Yobot EP	1992	Force Inc.
suEcide EP (Pt.1)	1992	Force Inc.
suEcide EP (Pt.2)	1992	Force Inc.
Das Duell EP (with Biochip C.)	1993	Force Inc.
Bass Terror EP	1993	Force Inc.
Limited Edition 1 EP	1993	Force Inc.
Limited Edition 2 EP	1994	Force Inc.
Digital Hardcore EP	1994	DHR
Death EP	1994	DHR
Destroyer EP	1994	Riot Beats
Destroyer EP Part 2	1994	Riot Beats
Pulse Code EP (with Ian Pooley)	1994	Mille Plateaux
The Destroyer EP	1996	Grand Royal
No Safety Pin Sex E.P.	1997	DHR
Shards of Pol-Pottery: The 2001 Remixes EP (with El-P)	2001	DHR
New World Order EP	2001	Beat Records
On Fire EP	2007	Eat Your Heart Out
Shivers	2009	Eat Your Heart Out

=== Singles ===
Title	Release date	Label
"Together for Never" (featuring Lucy Devils) (split with "Raverbashing" by Atari Teenage Riot)	1994	Riot Beats
"The King Of The Street / Brothers Crush"	1996	Riot Beats
"Addicted to You"	2002	DHR
"The Ride"	2002	DHR
"Gotta Get Out"	2005	DHR
"Kiss of Death"	2005	DHR
"Monk Time" (featuring Gary Burger of The Monks) (split with "Higgle-dy Piggle-dy" by The Fall)	2006	Play Loud!
"Robot L.O.V.E."	2007	Eat Your Heart Out

==== Remix singles ====
Title	Release date	Label
"SuEcide" (Pluto Rmxs)	1994	White Label Music
"SuEcide" (Wonka Remixes)	1994	Rare Grooves
"Hetzjagd Auf Nazis" (Panacea remix)	1997	Position Chrome

=== Live videos ===
Title	Release date	Label
Death Favours the Enemy: Live 2002 (DVD)	2002	DHR
Live at Fuji Rock 2001 (Tour exclusive) (DVDr)	2005	DHR
Sixteen Years of Video Material (with Atari Teenage Riot) (DVD)	2008	Monitorpop

=== DJ mixes ===
Title	Release date	Label
Cut the Pussies^{1}	1995	DHR Midiwar
DJ Spooky vs. Alec Empire (with DJ Spooky) (double cassette)^{1}	unknown	DHR
Capitol Noise - Chapter 1: Noise And Politics	1995	Capitol Noise
Generation Star Wars Party (19.12.'95 Bunker)^{1}	1995	DHR
Live at CBGB's New York City 4-11-98 (CDr)^{1}	2004	DHR
The Destroyer Mix Tape #3/98 (CDr)^{1}	2004	DHR
The Destroyer Mix Tape #4/04 (CDr)^{1}	2004	DHR
Japanese Noise Pt. 1 & 2 & 3 (3CDr)^{2}	2005	DHR
Tribute to R. Mooog (2CDr)^{2}	2005	DHR
DJ Mix Sun Ra (CDr)^{2}	2005	DHR
Live at the Suicide Club 1995 (CDr)^{1}	2006	DHR
Satellite of Fear (CDr)^{2}	2007	DHR
Eat Your Heart Out Mix^{1}	2008	Eat Your Heart Out

^{1} Mail order and online store exclusives
^{2} Tour exclusives

=== Compilation appearances ===
Song	Album	Date	Label
"Yobots Around My Neck (Theme From Tekkno Boy)"	Tekkno Boy	1992	Deutsche Schallplatten
"You Must Confront"	Destroy Deutschland!	1993	Force Inc.
"Anti-Nazi-Soulfood"	Destroy Deutschland!	1993	Force Inc.
"Forgive Not Mothafuckers! ('Cause it Doesn't Make it Alright!)"	Destroy Deutschland!	1993	Force Inc.
"Naomi Campbell"	Shocker: The Inferno Part II	1994	WEA, EastWest
"Alec's Blues"	Tribute to the Blues - Evolve or Die	1996	P-Vine
"The 6 Wisdoms of Aspasia"	The Spirit of Vampyros Lesbos	1997	Sideburn
"Alleged Accused Repeated Reused" (with Matt Pizzolo, feat. Jello Biafra and Seth Tobocman)	DIY-Fest	2001	DHR
"Tribute To Coil (Short Version)"	...It Just Is	2005	Nocharizma/Fulldozer
"Monk Time" (feat. Gary Burger of The Monks)	Silver Monk Time: A Tribute to The Monks	2006	play loud!

=== Remixes ===
Song	Artist	Album	Date	Label
"Dschungelfieber" (Alec Empire remix)	Space Cube	"Dschungelfieber" (Remixes) (single)	1994	Riot Beats
"31202" (remix)	Ford Prefect	Noise Love Unity - Love Parade '94 (compilation)	1994	D'vision
"Up Where We Belong" (FP23 mix)	SilkyWay	"Up Where We Belong"	1994	Phonogram
"Imago" (Alec Empire remix)	Air Liquide	Abuse Your Illusions - Part 1.1	1995	Harvest
"Harold" (Alec Empire mix)	Sonic Subjunkies	Sounds from the City of Quartz	1995	DHR
"Beautiful Day" (Digital Hardcore mix)	Nicolette	"Beautiful Day" (single)	1995	Talkin' Loud
"Dactylo Rock" (Ausrufezeichen)	Stereo Total	"Dactylo Rock" (single)	1996	Peace 95
"Die Menschen Aus Kiel" (Digital Hardcore remix)	Schorsch Kamerun	"Die Menschen Aus Kiel" (Remixe) (single)	1996	L'Âge d'or
"Know Your Chicken" (Alec Empire remix)	Cibo Matto	"Know Your Chicken" (single)	1996	Blanco Y Negro
"MotorRazor" (Digital Hardcore remix)	Think About Mutation	"MotorRazor 96" (single)	1996	Dynamica
"No Government" (Alec Empire remix)	Nicolette	21st Century Soul (compilation)	1997	Talkin' Loud
"My Way" (Remix by Alec Empire)	Audio Active	Apollo Choco Remixed	1997	On-U Sound
"Bachelorette" (Hypermodern Jazz)	Björk	"Bachelorette" (single)	1997	One Little Indian
"Bachelorette" (The Ice Princess & The Killer Whale)	Björk	"Bachelorette" (single)	1997	One Little Indian
"Jóga" (Empire State of Emergency)	Björk	"Jóga" (single)	1997	One Little Indian
"Jóga" (The Destroyer)	Björk	"Jóga" (single)	1997	One Little Indian
"Mood of Mods Generation" (Alec Empire remix)	Violent Onsen Geisha & DMBQ	Digital Catastroph 1997 (compilation)	1997	ZK
"Papua" (Alec Empire remix)	Surfers of Romantika	Digital Catastroph 1997 (compilation)	1997	ZK
"The Garden" (The White Chair remix)	Einstürzende Neubauten	Ende Neu (Remixes)	1997	PIAS
"Friss Scheisse" (Digital Hardcore remix)	Schweisser	"Friss Scheisse" (single)	1997	Bullet Proof
"Dr. Moog" (The Destroyer remix)	Buffalo Daughter	Socks, Drugs and Rock and Roll	1997	Grand Royal
"Dance or Be Shot"	Bottom 12	"Dance or Be Shot" (single)	1997	unknown
"Consumed" (Digital Hardcore mix)	Mark Stewart	Consumed - The Remix Wars	1998	Mute
"Crash Pow" (Alec Empire remix)	The Mad Capsule Markets	Digidogheadlock	1998	JVC
"Creature" (Digital Hardcore remix)	The Mad Capsule Markets	Digidogheadlock	1998	JVC
"Like Herod" (Face The Future Remix)	Mogwai	Kicking a Dead Pig: Mogwai Songs Remixed	1998	Jetset
"R U Still in 2 It?" (Straight Demons remix)	Mogwai	"R U Still in 2 It?" (promo single)	1998	Eye Q
"Keep Trying the Old Number" (Alec Empire remix)	Thurston Moore	Root	1998	Lo
"Atomic Buddha" (Version Alec Empire)	Techno Animal	Techno Animal Versus Reality	1998	City Slang
"Heat" (Alec Empire remix)	R. L. Burnside	Come On In	1998	Fat Possum
"Keep On Rockin'" (Alec Empire remix)	Shonen Knife	Ultramix	1998	MCA Victor Japan
"Trapped in Three Dimensions" (Alec Empire mix)	Ice	"Trapped In Three Dimensions" (single)	1999	Morpheus
"Godzilla March" (Digital Hardcore remix)	Destroy the Monsters	Godzilla 2000 Japan (soundtrack)	2000	Nippon Columbia
"Jet Virus" (Digital Hardcore remix)	Guitar Wolf	Rock n' Roll Etiquette	2000	Ki/Oon
"It's a Burning Hell" (remix)	Brainbombs	Cheap (EP)	2001	Load
"Miss Lucifer" (Panther Girl)	Primal Scream	"Miss Lucifer" (single)	2002	Columbia
"Miss Lucifer" (Bone to Bone)	Primal Scream	"Miss Lucifer" (single)	2002	Columbia
"Digital Hardcore" (Alec Empire mix)	Merzbow	Ikebana: Amlux Rebuilt, Reused and Recycled	2003	Important
"Skool Daze" (Alec Empire remix)	Chris Vrenna	"Skool Daze"/"Late Night Shopping" (single)	2003	Waxploitation
"Amerika" (Digital Hardcore mix)	Rammstein	"Amerika" (single)	2004	Universal
"Reach" (Alec Empire remix)	Panic DHH	"Reach" (single)	2004	DHR
"Mann Gegen Mann" (Futurist remix)	Rammstein	"Mann gegen Mann" (single)	2006	Universal
"Oxygen Debt" (Pandemic remix)	Most Precious Blood	Threat: Music That Inspired the Movie (compilation)	2006	Halo 8
"New York City" (Alec Empire remix)	Emigrate	"New York City" (single)	2007	Motor Music

=== Production credits ===
Album	Artist	Track(s)	Role	Year	Label
"Acid Head"/"L.S.D."	Zen Faschisten	"Acid Head"	Producer	unknown	Choose
Show EP	Hanin Elias	—	Producer	1996	DHR
Let No One Live Rent Free in Your Head	Nicolette	"Nervous", "Nightmare"	Producer	1996	Talkin' Loud
Disco Sukkers EP	Killout Trash	—	Mastering	1997	AIPR
ACME	Jon Spencer Blues Explosion	"Attack"	Mixing	1998	Matador
So... How's Your Girl?	Handsome Boy Modeling School	"Megaton B-Boy" (with El-P)	Mixing	1999	Tommy Boy
"Red Hot Riding Hood" (single)	Lolita Storm	—	Mixing	2000	DHR
No Games, No Fun	Hanin Elias	"You Suck"	Producer	2003	Fatal
The Bachelor	Patrick Wolf	"Vulture", "Battle"	Co-Producer, Co-Writer	2009	Bloody Chamber Music

=== Other credits ===
Album	Artist	Track(s)	Role	Year	Label
Enough of This	Martin Peter	"Bypass"	Vocals	2005	Angora Steel

=== Music videos ===
- Civilisation Virus (a short film by Philipp Virus, soundtrack by Empire, 1993)
- "We All Die!" (directed by Philipp Virus, 1994)
- "Low on Ice" (Philipp Virus, 1995)
- The Report (a short film by Philipp Virus, soundtrack by Empire, 1996)
- "You Ain't Nothing" (Alec Empire vs. Elvis Presley) (Philipp Virus, 1999)
- "Attack" (with Jon Spencer Blues Explosion) (Philipp Virus, Nimra Lethe & Tom Edon, 1999)
- "Addicted to You" (John Hillcoat, 2002)
- "The Ride" (Jonathan Miles, 2003)
- "New World Order" (Fabien Knecht, 2003)
- "Kiss of Death" (Fabien Knecht, 2005)
- "On Fire" (Philipp Virus, 2007)

== Curse of the Golden Vampire (with Techno Animal) ==
- Curse of the Golden Vampire (DHR 1998)

== Death Funk ==
- Funk Riot Beat (DHR 1997)

== DJ 6666 feat. The Illegals ==
- Death Breathing (DHR 1998)

== DJ Mowgly ==
- Cook EP (DHR 1994)

=== Video ===
- "Cook" (Philipp Virus, 1994)

== E.C.P ==
- E.C.P (Riot Beats 1995)
- Generate (Riot Beats 1995)
- E.C.P. (feat. The Slaughter of Acid) (Riot Beats 1996)

== Jaguar ==
- Jaguar EP (Force Inc. 1994)
- Berlin Sky EP (Analog 1995)
- Two Space Cowboys on a Bad Trip (with Ian Pooley) (Force Inc. 1996)
- Two Space Cowboys on a Trip to Texas (with Ian Pooley) (Force Inc. 1996)
- The Jaguar EP (Force Inc. 1996)

== LX Empire ==
- "Unequal Chord" on the compilation Techno Rave (!Hype 1991)

=== Production ===
- "There's No Love in Tekkno" (single) by Hanin (Force Inc. 1992)

== Naomi Campbell ==
- "Spinball Attack" on the compilation Braindead (Generator Records 1994)

An edited version of the track "Naomi Campbell" from the Shocker compilation

== Nero ==
- "Youth Against Racism" on the compilation Destroy Deutschland! (Force Inc. 1993)

== Nintendo Teenage Robots ==
- We Punk Einheit! (DHR 1999)

=== Video ===
- "We Punk Einheit!" (Philipp Virus, 1999)

== P.J.P. ==
- "Noise So Sweet" and "Dreadlock Kool" on the compilation Rough and Fast (Riot Beats 1994)

== Richard Benson ==
- Debut EP (Force Inc. 1995)
- Diamonds and Pills EP (Force Inc. 1995)
- Rich in Paradise EP (Force Inc. 1996)

=== Compilation appearances ===
- "Feel You Deep Inside" on FIM 100 (Force Inc. 1995)
- "You Know How to Love Me" on Rauschen 9 (Force Inc. 1995)

=== Remix ===
- "Chord Memory" (Richard Benson mix) for Ian Pooley, on "Chord Memory" (Force Inc. 1996)

== Wipe Out ==
- "Two Steps Beyond the Terror"/"China Girl" (Position Chrome 1996)
