= Jonathan Miles =

Jonathan Miles may refer to:

- Jonathan Miles (novelist) (born 1971), American novelist
- Jonathan Miles, English novelist
- Jonathan Miles (filmmaker), British filmmaker
- Jonathan Miles (footballer) (born 1993), English footballer
- Jonathan Miles (cricketer) (born 1986), English cricketer
- Jonathan Miles (17th century), the founder of Jonathan's Coffee-House
- Reginald F. Sparkes (1906–1990), educator, author and political figure in Newfoundland who wrote a weekly column under the name "Jonathan Miles"
