= The Ride (Alec Empire song) =

Single by Alec Empire

from the album Intelligence and Sacrifice
- Released: (United Kingdom) 2002
- Length: 14:04 (CD 1); 12:59 (CD 2); 20:46 (Vinyl)
- Label: Digital Hardcore Recordings
- Producer(s): Alec Empire

CD 2 Cover

Vinyl Cover

"The Ride" is a song by Alec Empire and is the second track on his album Intelligence and Sacrifice. The song was released as the third single from the album.

The video for the song was directed by Jonathan Miles.

== Track listing ==
=== CD 1 ===
1. The Ride (Clean Version) - 3:32
2. Addicted to You (Part II Perish to the Beat of the Dead) - 7:16
3. DF02 - 3:16

=== CD 2 ===
1. The Ride (Dirty Version) - 3:31
2. Death Favours the Enemy (Live) - 3:32
3. It Should Be You Not Me - 5:56
- Tracks "DF02" and "It Should Be You Not Me" are taken from the album Miss Black America (1999).

=== Vinyl ===
A1. The Ride (Original Full Length Version) - 8:28
B1. The Ride (Dirty Version) - 3:33
B2. The Ride (Walk Amongst the Ruins Remix) - 8:45

- The vinyl version of "The Ride" was pressed in a limited quantity of 500 copies. However, the DHR online store still had copies for sale as of July 2007.
