= Shards of Pol-Pottery =

EP by Alec Empire
- Released: 2001
- Recorded: 1999, 2001
- Label: Digital Hardcore Recordings
- Producer: Alec Empire

Alec Empire chronology
Alec Empire vs. Elvis Presley (1999)	Shards of Pol-Pottery (2001)	Intelligence and Sacrifice (2001)

Shards of Pol-Pottery: The 2001 Remixes is an EP by Alec Empire and El-P, the title track of which is a re-production of the song "Megaton B-Boy" from the 1999 Handsome Boy Modelling School album So... How's Your Girl?. The EP contains 12 different versions of the songs including remixes, instrumentals and an a cappella.

== Track listing ==
=== CD (enhanced) ===
1. (Hard Mix)
2. (A Capella)
3. (Hard Beats)
4. (Hard Beats & Voice)
5. (Hard Instrumental)
6. (String Mix)
7. (String Mix Instrumental)
8. (String Beats)
9. (String Beats & Vocals)
10. (No Wave Mix)
11. (Generation Star Wars Mix)
12. (Black Moon Mix)

=== Vinyl (12") ===
1. (Hard Mix)
2. (A Cappella)
3. (Hard Beats)
4. (No Wave Mix)
5. (String Mix)
6. (String Mix Instrumental)
7. (String Beats)
8. (String Beats & Vocals)
