= The CD2 Sessions: Live in London 7‒12‒2002 =

The CD2 Sessions: Live in London 7-12-2002

Live album by Alec Empire
- Released: June 9, 2003
- Recorded: December 7, 2002
- Label: Digital Hardcore Recordings
- Producer: Alec Empire

Alec Empire chronology
Live CBGB's NYC 1998 (2003)	The CD2 Sessions: Live in London 7-12-2002 (2003)	Futurist (2005)

The CD2 Sessions: Live in London 7-12-2002 is a live album by Alec Empire, performed at the Institute of Contemporary Arts in London in December 2002 and released on Digital Hardcore Recordings in 2003. The material performed is based on the experimental electronic material released on CD^{2} of Intelligence and Sacrifice.

== Track listing ==
1. "SUCTION"
2. "Synthetic Movement"
3. "Technological Warfare"
4. "Alec's Ladder"
5. "From Dream to Reality"
6. "2641998"
7. "Breakdown"
8. "Gameboy Off Show"
9. "Back to the Rhythm"
10. "Electric Body Rock"
11. "Waiting for the End that Never Came"
12. "Low Down"
