= New World Order EP =

EP by Alec Empire
- Released: July 2001 (Japan)
- Length: 18:27
- Label: Digital Hardcore Recordings; Beat Records
- Producer: Alec Empire

Alec Empire EP chronology
| Shards of Pol-Pottery (2001) | New World Order EP (2001) | On Fire EP (2007) |

The New World Order EP is an EP by Alec Empire, released in July 2001 only in Japan, from his album Intelligence and Sacrifice. It was released shortly before the Japanese release of the album. The EP contains among others two tracks from the "Shards of Pol-Pottery" EP by Alec Empire and El-P.

== Track listing ==
1. "New World Order" - 3:32
2. "Path of Destruction" - 4:06
3. "Shards of Pol-Pottery (Hard Mix)"* - 5:10
4. "Shards of Pol-Pottery (Funk Mix)"* - 5:39

* featuring El-P
