= Hidden History of the Human Race =

Studio album by Blood Incantation
- Released: November 22, 2019
- Recorded: June 2019
- Studios: World Famous Studios; (Denver, Colorado)
- Genres: Technical death metal; psychedelic rock
- Length: 36:20
- Labels: Dark Descent; Century Media

Blood Incantation chronology
Live Vitrification (2018)	Hidden History of the Human Race (2019)	Timewave Zero (2022)

Hidden History of the Human Race is the second studio album by American death metal band Blood Incantation.

All of the tracks from Hidden History of the Human Race were first performed live at the Fire In The Mountains festival in Jackson, Wyoming on July 13, 2019, and the recorded album was released in all formats on November 22, 2019, by Dark Descent Records in North America and Century Media Records in all other countries. The artwork consists of Bruce Pennington's front cover for the Brian Aldiss novel Space, Time and Nathaniel (1957) with the band logo and the name of the album superimposed onto it - incidentally this image was previously used for the cover artwork of both Alec Empire’s 1996 album Hypermodern Jazz 2000.5 and the 1995 album Apocalyptic Dawning from Montréal death metal group Agony. Commercially, the LP was a Billboard United States Heatseekers Albums chart-topper and a top 40 hit on the same magazine's Current Albums chart. It also was claimed by several critics to be the metal album of the year and made the year-end lists of publications such as Stereogum, Pitchfork, Metal Hammer, Consequence of Sound, BrooklynVegan, and The Quietus.

== Background ==
Not counting "The Giza Power Plant" written in 2013, writing of Hidden History of the Human Race lasted for more than three years; With the intention of making challenging metal music, members of Blood Incantation intentionally wrote parts they couldn't perform initially, and rehearsed them for more than a month before recording began. "Inner Paths (to Outer Space)" was written improvised for several months with all the group members on psychedelics, and features Demilich vocalist Antti Boman performing growl vocals at the end. Hidden History of the Human Race was analog-recorded at World Famous Studios in Denver starting June 21, 2019.

Blood Incantation first performed the entirety of Hidden History of the Human Race at the Fire In The Mountains festival in Jackson, Wyoming on July 13, 2019. The band later performed "Slave Species of the Gods" live as part of the 2019 Decibel magazine tour with Immolation; Hidden History of the Human Race was originally planned to be released in coincidence with the tour, but it was pushed back to a later fall 2019 date due to the deadline being too limited.

"Inner Paths (to Outer Space)" was issued as the album's lead single on October 11, 2019 before "Slave Species of the Gods" was released as the second on November 11, 2019; its music video was released the same day and consists of a VHS-recorded live performance of the song on October 11, 2019, in Santa Ana, California. Hidden History of the Human Race was released to all formats on November 22, 2019, in the United States by Dark Descent Records in North America and Century Media Records in all other territories.

The artwork for Hidden History of the Human Race uses the front cover of Brian Aldiss' novel Space, Time and Nathaniel (1957) created by British painter Bruce Pennington, which the band chose to use before they recorded their debut LP. Upon the cover's reveal in September 2019, it garnered negative buzz from listeners in the metal community as they found it a rip-off of another album's artwork that also used the same Pennington piece, Canadian group Agony's Apocalyptic Dawning (1995); electronic musician Alec Empire also used the cover for the front cover of his album released the same year, Hypermodern Jazz 2000.5. Another one of Pennington's works from 1973 also made up the artwork of Blood Incantation's debut extended play Interdimensional Extinction (2015).

== Content ==
With Hidden History of the Human Race, Blood Incantation went out to produce "a genuine and distinctive album of monumental and epic psychedelic/brutal/progressive/technical/ambient/funeral death metal like no other," summarized Paul Riedl. While continuing the cosmic soundscapes and themes of Starspawn (2016), Hidden History of the Human Race is more focused and consistent compositionally and more upfront and harsh mixing-wise, with an increase in meaty guitars, clear drums, and reverb and delay effects. The track listing is set up in the tradition of 1970s progressive rock albums, with three tracks on side A and one long epic on side B. Lyrically, the album questions traditional and agreed-upon theories about the human species, specifically evolution, consciousness, and how they have historically developed societies.

Hidden History of the Human Race presents a move of death metal in the 2010s towards spiritual tinges away from extreme cynicism, which was also showcased via the works of Toronto-based Tomb Mold and the Philadelphia-based Horrendous. Blood Incantation described "Inner Paths (to Outer Space)" as a "meditative journey through the inner cosmos of the human mind," where "the atmosphere is meant to allow the listener time and space to explore their own thoughts and go on their own journey before the epic brutality of the album returns for the final track." The Line of Best Fit compared the album's space-y and ambient aspects to the recent works of Gojira and Mastodon. Similarities to Paradise Lost, Nile, Obituary, Entombed, Gorguts, Atheist, Cynic, Death, and Cannibal Corpse were also noted in reviews.

== Critical reception ==
Professional ratings
Aggregate scores
Source	Rating
AnyDecentMusic?	8.6/10
Metacritic	91/100
Review scores
Source	Rating
Brave Words & Bloody Knuckles	8.5/10
Exclaim!	9/10
Kerrang!	4/5
The Line of Best Fit	10/10
Metal Injection	10/10
Metal Sucks	5/5 stars
Pitchfork	8.3/10
Sputnikmusic	5/5
Toilet Ov Hell	5/5 stars

One of the most anticipated metal records of 2019, Hidden History of the Human Race was greeted with critical acclaim of it being the best metal album of the year as well as the decade and a classic. Both Metal Sucks and Toilet Ov Hell called it much better than Starspawn, Metal Sucks reasoning that "the songs take more surprising turns, the production sounds better, [and] the performances feel tighter" and Toilet Ov Hell claiming that it was "bigger, better, more badass and just plain weirder."

Kerrang! critic Angela Davey praised it for being "mostly fun" for a metal album and having "enough swampy death metal moments to prevent it from ever flying off completely into the cosmos." Christopher Luedtke of Metal Injection noted that the timing of disparate elements, sometimes sudden and sometimes expect, was so "coldly calculated it's unreal;" he particularly claimed that the last track "weaves [multiple styles and layers] so seamlessly and maintains a pace that makes not a single second of it boring."

The album's atmosphere and vibe was a common spotlight, particularly in relation to the analog recording technique. Jack Kelleher stated in an Exclaim! review that "you breathe the atmosphere of this record when you listen to it" which is "why you'll return to it again and again," while Pitchfork claims the "music feels meditative, despite all its frenetic motion; they recorded the entire thing—every interlocking part and lightspeed tempo switch—analog, which means that you are hearing a band breathing as an organism, a group of people accomplishing something remarkable when you play it."

=== Year-end lists ===
Publication	Rank
BrooklynVegan	47
Decibel	1
Invisible Oranges	1
Loudwire	Unranked
Metal Hammer	24
Metal Sucks (Jeff Treppel)	6
Pitchfork	41
The Quietus	58
Revolver	25
Stereogum	44

== Track listing ==
No.	Title	Length
1.	"Slave Species of the Gods"	5:31
2.	"The Giza Power Plant"	7:06
3.	"Inner Paths (to Outer Space)"	5:38
4.	"Awakening": i. "From the Dream of Existence..."; ii. "...to the Multidimensional Nature of Our Reality"; iii. "(Mirror of the Soul)"	18:05
Total length:		36:20

== Personnel ==
Blood Incantation

- Paul Riedl – vocals, guitars, keyboards
- Isaac Faulk – drums, keyboards
- Morris Kolontyrsky – guitars, keyboards
- Jeff Barrett – fretless bass, keyboards, tamboura

== Charts ==
Chart (2019)	Peak position
UK Rock & Metal Albums (Official Charts)	34
US Top Current Albums (Billboard)	36
US Heatseekers Albums (Billboard)	1
US Independent Albums (Billboard)	6
