= Timewave Zero (Blood Incantation album) =

Studio album by Blood Incantation
- Released: February 25, 2022
- Genre: Ambient; space music
- Length: 40:38
- Label: Century Media

Blood Incantation chronology
Hidden History of the Human Race (2019)	Timewave Zero (2022)	Luminescent Bridge (2023)

Timewave Zero is the third studio album by American band Blood Incantation. It was released on February 25, 2022, on Century Media.

== Background ==
The band stated that it planned a trajectory as early as their first rehearsal, deciding that the band’s signature sound would be cosmically influenced death metal, its sophomore album would feature psychedelic elements, and its third album would be entirely ambient. After the album's release, lead guitarist and vocalist Paul Riedl confirmed that the band’s follow up album would be a return to their signature metal style.

== Musical style ==
The album is a departure from the group's typical death metal sound, not featuring any distorted electric guitars, drums, or vocals. It has been described as ambient and space music. The album is composed of two songs, each separated into four movements. At 40 minutes and 38 seconds, it is the band’s second-longest studio album, behind its fourth album Absolute Elsewhere, released on October 10, 2024.

== Reception ==
The album was generally well received upon release. Sam Sodomsky of Pitchfork gave the album a score of 7.5/10 and stated, "Listening to Timewave Zero, you can sense the band proudly embracing its transitional nature, rarely attempting to push beyond its self-imposed boundaries—a triumph by existence alone, an itch they had to scratch." Dutch Pearce of Decibel magazine wrote "it doesn’t take long for the cosmic winds of “IO,” the first track on Timewave Zero, to convince you that your trust in boarding this extraordinary voyage will be rewarded."

Angry Metal Guy was critical of the album, giving it a score of 2.0/5 and writing "Although pleasant in stretches, or as background music, largely I found the album a chore to listen to; a tedious, patience testing slab of ambient experimentation best left for other ears to fully enjoy and embrace."

== Track listing ==
No.	Title	Length
1.	"Io": "First Movement"; "Second Movement"; "Third Movement"; "Fourth Movement"	20:56: 7:05; 4:58; 5:30; 3:23
2.	"Ea": "First Movement"; "Second Movement"; "Third Movement"; "Fourth Movement"	19:39: 7:21; 2:23; 5:34; 4:21
Total length:		40:38

== Personnel ==
Blood Incantation

- Paul Riedl – keyboards
- Isaac Faulk – keyboards, percussion
- Morris Kolontyrsky – guitars, keyboards
- Jeff Barrett – keyboards, tamboura
