= Squeeze the Trigger =

Compilation album by Alec Empire
- Released: 1997
- Genre: Digital hardcore Breakcore
- Label: Digital Hardcore Recordings; Beat Records (Japan)
- Producer: Alec Empire

Alec Empire chronology
Les Étoiles des Filles Mortes (1996)	Squeeze the Trigger (1997)	The Geist of Alec Empire (1997)

Professional ratings
Review scores
Source	Rating
NME	8/10 stars

Squeeze the Trigger is a 1997 album by Alec Empire, his second for his own Digital Hardcore Recordings label. It compiles tracks from out-of-print singles issued on the Riot Beats label, many of which were originally attributed to various pseudonyms. Releases tracks are taken from include Squeeze the Trigger, The Destroyer and The King Of The Street Feat. Brothers Crush.

== Track listing ==
1. "Squeeze the Trigger" - 6:15
2. "Silver Pills" - 6:36
3. "Fuck the Shit Up" - 3:29
4. "Streets of Gold" - 6:35
5. "The King of the Street" - 5:22
6. "The Brothers Crush" - 6:38
7. "The Drum and the Bass" - 5:18
8. "Generate" - 4:53
9. "Euphoric" - 5:42
10. "The Destroyer" - 5:53
11. "Burn Babylon Burn" - 3:35
12. "Destruction" - 4:54
13. "I Am You (Identity)" - 5:22

=== Bonus CD ===
A bonus CD was included with Beat Records' release of the album in Japan.

1. "Hectic"
2. "L.E.A."
3. "In between Two Girls"
4. "Rise of the Lion"
5. "I Want Action" (Demo Version)
