= The Geist of Alec Empire =

Compilation album by Alec Empire
- Released: 1997
- Genre: Digital hardcore
- Label: Geist Records
- Producer: Alec Empire

The Geist of Alec Empire is a 3 CD compilation album by electronic artist Alec Empire. While the majority of the album is tracks previously released on the Mille Plateaux label, some original material is present.

== Track listing ==
=== CD 1 ===
1. "22:24" - 4:44
  - a longer version of this song appears on Low On Ice, this version is approximately the same length as the music video.Various - DHR Compilation
2. "Kick Some Soul Pt. 2" - 5:58
  - previously released on the compilation Electric Ladyland
3. "Kick Some Soul Pt. 1" - 7:53
  - previously released on the compilation Electric Ladyland
4. "Kick Some Dirt Pt. 2" - 5:40
  - previously released on the compilation Electric Ladyland II
5. "I'm Gonna Die If I Fall Asleep Again" - 5:21
  - previously released on Hypermodern Jazz 2000.5
6. "God Told Me How To Kiss" - 6:52
  - previously released on Hypermodern Jazz 2000.5
7. "Many Bars And No Money" - 5:59
  - previously released on Hypermodern Jazz 2000.5
8. "___ (Low On Ice-Track 2)" - 6:41
  - previously released on Low On Ice
9. "Sweet" - 5:58
  - previously released on Limited Editions 1990-94
10. "3 Bullets In The Back" - 6:12
  - previously released on the compilation Electric Ladyland III
11. "City Of Lights" - 7:10
  - previously released on the compilation Electric Ladyland III as "Cities Of Light"

=== CD 2 ===
1. "Sieg Über Die Mayday HJ" - 5:12
  - previously released on Generation Star Wars
2. "Get Some" - 5:38
  - previously released on Hypermodern Jazz 2000.5
3. "Low On Ice" - 7:53
  - previously released on Low On Ice
4. "The Backside Of My Brain" - 7:55
  - previously released on Limited Editions 1990-94
5. "Maschinenvolk" - 7:37
  - previously released on Generation Star Wars
6. "Civilisation Virus" - 13:28
  - previously released on Limited Editions 1990-94
7. "Metall Dub" - 6:58
  - previously released on Low On Ice
8. "13465" - 4:08
  - previously released on Generation Star Wars
9. "Stahl Und Blausäure" - 4:48
  - previously released on Generation Star Wars
10. "Lash The Nineties" - 8:23
  - a shorter version of a song previously released on Generation Star Wars

=== CD 3 ===
1. "The Sun Hurts My Eyes" - 12:07
  - previously released on Limited Editions 1990-94
2. "The Report" - 7:16
  - previously unreleased, from the Philipp Virus short film The Report (1996)
3. "SuEcide" - 6:32
  - previously released on Limited Editions 1990-94
4. "___ (Low On Ice-Track 6)" - 5:50
  - previously released on Low On Ice
5. "Slowly Falling In Love" - 4:18
  - previously released on Hypermodern Jazz 2000.5
6. "Walk The Apocalypse" - 5:11
  - previously released on Hypermodern Jazz 2000.5
7. "La Ville De Filles Mortes" - 5:40
  - previously released on Les Étoiles des Filles Mortes
8. "Opus 28 - Pour La Liberté Des Milles Universes" - 6:10
  - previously released on Les Étoiles des Filles Mortes
9. "La Guerre D'Opium" - 6:15
  - previously released on Les Étoiles des Filles Mortes
10. "Swimming Through Nails" - 6:53
  - previously unreleased
11. "We Have Arrived" - 3:56
  - previously unreleased
12. "Clean Circuit" - 3:41
  - previously unreleased
