= Death Favours the Enemy: Live 2002 =

Video by Alec Empire
- Released: November 4, 2002
- Recorded: 2002
- Label: Digital Hardcore Recordings
- Producer: Alec Empire

Death Favours the Enemy: Live 2002 is a video recording of four songs from live shows in London and Berlin, featuring the recently formed Alec Empire band performing material from the album Intelligence and Sacrifice. It was directed by Philipp "Virus" Reichenheim, and released on DVD in 2002. The DVD also features the promo video for "Addicted to You", directed by John Hillcoat.

The disc is a two sided DVD. One side is in PAL the other in NTSC.

== Band members ==
- Alec Empire (vocals)
- Nic Endo (synths, samplers, programming, musical director)
- Robbie Furze (guitars)
- Max Williams (drums)

== Track listing ==
1. "Death Favours the Enemy"
2. "Addicted to You"
3. "Intelligence And Sacrifice"
4. "New World Order"
5. "Addicted to You" (video)

== Notes ==
- "New World Order" is nearly 15 minutes in length, as the song concludes with a noise freestyle generated by Nic Endo.
- John Hillcoat previously directed the video for "Too Dead for Me" by Atari Teenage Riot. He later directed the film The Proposition, written by Nick Cave.
- Philipp Virus has collaborated numerous times with Empire, and has directed most of the videos for DHR, which can be seen on Digital Hardcore: The Videos.
