= Tribute to R. Mooog =

Tribute To R. Mooog

Remix album by Alec Empire
- Released: 2005
- Label: Digital Hardcore Recordings

Tribute To R. Mooog [sic] is a 3xCD-R DJ mix by Alec Empire dedicated to Robert Moog. The set was sold only during Alec Empire's 2005-2006 Futurist tour. The set comes in a plastic envelope which fastens with velcro, spraypainted metallic blue. The discs themselves are 5", but the actual recording surface is only 3".

According to Alec Empire: "I mean it's a bit more than a DJ mix because there are fx, extra sounds and shit involved."

== Track listing ==
CD 1

1. (untitled) - 18:48

CD 2

1. (untitled) - 18:15
