= The Destroyer (Alec Empire album) =

Studio album by Alec Empire
- Released: June 1996
- Recorded: February 12, 1994 – April 1996
- Studio: Empire Studios (Berlin, Germany)
- Genre: Digital hardcore, breakcore
- Length: 72:32; 74:39 (US)
- Label: Digital Hardcore Recordings
- Producer: Alec Empire

Alec Empire chronology
Hypermodern Jazz (1996)	The Destroyer (1996)	Les Étoiles des Filles Mortes (1996)

Professional ratings
Review scores
Source	Rating
AllMusic	4.5/5 stars
Pitchfork Media	6.7/10

The Destroyer is an album by electronic artist Alec Empire, his first on his own record label Digital Hardcore Recordings, released in 1996 in Europe and a revised version in 1998 in United States. Destroyer is also the name given to a series of EPs by Empire released two years before. Unlike his previous albums for Mille Plateaux, The Destroyer had a much heavier sound more akin to that of his band Atari Teenage Riot, and is considered one of the earliest examples of a breakcore record. Producer Enduser named the album as an inspiration for his music. The album peaked at #54 on the CMJ Radio Top 200 in the U.S.

== Track listing ==
1996 European CD
No.	Title	Length
1.	Untitled	0:21
2.	"We All Die!"	7:07
3.	"Suicide"	4:54
4.	"Bang Your Head!"	5:37
5.	"Don't Lie, White Girl!"	4:35
6.	"Fire Bombing"	4:17
7.	"I Just Wanna Destroy..."	4:51
8.	"Bonus Beats"	4:03
9.	"Nobody Gets Out Alive!"	5:34
10.	"My Body Cannot Die"	4:25
11.	"The Peak"	3:54
12.	"Heartbeat That Isn't There"	3:08
13.	"I Don't Care What Happens"	5:11
14.	"My Face Would Crack"	6:46
15.	"Pleasure Is Our Business (Live!)"	7:42
16.	Untitled	0:07
Total length:		72:32

1998 US CD Edition
No.	Title	Length
1.	"Hard Like It's A Pose" (previously released on Funk Riot Beat)	5:49
2.	"What Are You Talking About" (previously released on No Safety Pin Sex E.P.)	5:01
3.	"Down With The Shit" (previously released on Funk Riot Beat)	4:51
4.	"We All Die!"	7:07
5.	"Suicide"	4:54
6.	"Bang Your Head!"	5:36
7.	"Heartbeat That Isn't There"	3:06
8.	"Nobody Gets Out Alive!"	5:33
9.	"Fire Bombing"	4:16
10.	"The Peak"	3:56
11.	"Bonus Beats"	4:03
12.	"I Don't Care What Happens"	5:11
13.	"My Face Would Crack"	6:47
14.	"Pleasure Is Our Business (Live!)"	7:39
Total length:		73:49
