= Hypermodern Jazz 2000.5 =

Studio album by Alec Empire
- Released: April 1, 1996
- Recorded: January 1996
- Genre: Experimental, IDM, nu-jazz, Breakbeat
- Length: 50:04
- Label: Mille Plateaux
- Producer: Alec Empire

Alec Empire chronology
Low on Ice (1995)	Hypermodern Jazz 2000.5 (1996)	The Destroyer (1996)

Professional ratings
Review scores
Source	Rating
Allmusic	4/5 stars

Hypermodern Jazz 2000.5 (usually shortened to Hypermodern Jazz) is a studio album by German musician Alec Empire. It was released in 1996. It was Empire's fourth full-length solo album, his fourth release for the Mille Plateaux label, and the first of three albums he released in the same year. The Destroyer was released on DHR the following June and Les Étoiles des Filles Mortes, also for Mille Plateaux, in November.

As its title suggests, the record exhibits an experimental approach to jazz, utilising electronics and synthesizers.

The artwork consists of Bruce Pennington's front cover for the Brian Aldiss novel Space, Time and Nathaniel (1957). The same image was used by the American death metal band Blood Incantation for their 2019 album Hidden History of the Human Race.

== Track listing ==
No.	Title	Length
1.	"Walk the Apocalypse"	5:12
2.	"God Told Me How to Kiss"	5:12
3.	"Get Some"	5:40
4.	"I'm Gonna Die If I Fall Asleep Again"	5:22
5.	"The Unknown Stepdancer"	1:32
6.	"Chilling Through the Lives"	5:01
7.	"Many Bars and No Money"	6:01
8.	"My Funk is Useless"	5:43
9.	"Slowly Falling in Love"	4:20
10.	"Dreaming is a Form of Astrotravel"	4:17
