= On Fire (EP) =

On Fire EP

EP by Alec Empire
- Released: December 7, 2007
- Genre: Electronic; Rock
- Length: 44:50 (CD); 18:21 (Digital download)
- Label: Eat Your Heart Out Records
- Producer: Alec Empire; The Hellish Vortex

Alec Empire EP chronology
New World Order EP (2001)	On Fire EP (2007)

Limited edition CD packaging

The On Fire EP is an EP by Alec Empire, released on December 7, 2007, from his album The Golden Foretaste of Heaven. It contains the title track, several remixes and all tracks from the single "Robot L.O.V.E.", previously issued on vinyl. Initially planned as a four-track digital download only release, it was also released as a ten track limited edition CD mounted on blue plexi-glass and sealed in a silver see-through plastic bag.

== The song ==
"On Fire" first materialised as a b-side to the single "Gotta Get Out", from Empire's 2005 album Futurist. The track that appears on The Golden Foretaste of Heaven is a re-produced version sub-titled "The Hellish Vortex Sessions".

== Track listing ==
=== CD ===
1. "On Fire" (radio edit) - 4:31
2. "On Fire" (Hellish Vortex club remix) - 5:12
3. "Bug On My Windshield" (Berlin COC remix) - 3:52
4. "On Fire" (Berlin electro remix) - 4:46
5. "On Fire" (Hellish Vortex club remix alternative version) 5:12
6. "Bug On My Windshield" (Berlin COC remix dub) 3:44
7. "On Fire" (Berlin electro remix dub) - 4:46
8. "Robot L.O.V.E." - 3:48
9. "Ice" (dub) - 4:05
10. "Naginita" - 4:54

=== Digital download ===
1. "On Fire" (radio edit) - 4:31
2. "On Fire" (Berlin electro remix) - 4:46
3. "On Fire" (Hellish Vortex club remix) - 5:12
4. "Bug On My Windshield" (Berlin COC remix) - 3:52
