= Starspawn =

Studio album by Blood Incantation
- Released: August 19, 2016
- Studio: World Famous Studios
- Genres: Death metal; progressive metal
- Length: 34:29
- Language: English
- Label: Dark Descent Records
- Producer: Pete deBoer

Blood Incantation chronology
Interdimensional Extinction (2015)	Starspawn (2016)	Live Vitrification (2018)

Starspawn is the debut studio album by American death metal band Blood Incantation. It was released on August 19, 2016 through Dark Descent Records.

== Background ==
The album was recorded at World Famous Studios in Denver, Colorado, and was produced by Pete deBoer. In an interview, the band stated that "Everything was done live with tubes, tape, etc – there are no triggers, click-tracks or quantized anything on the recording, no cut & paste and very few punch-ins." Vocalist/guitarist Paul Riedl said that the album "deals mostly with the inner world of mind, the unification and eventual willed transcendence of the Macro and the Micro, realizing that there is “No Death as known, only Doorways” and that YOU are the stargate."

== Musical style ==
The album has been described as death metal, and progressive metal.

== Reception ==
Starspawn received positive reviews from critics. Metal Injection gave it a score of 9/10 and stated "Paul Riedel’s vocals sound like they’re echoing from a cave in aeons past. It’s the primitive nature of the album that probably won’t surprise listeners, but it will immerse them in the experience." Angry Metal Guy was also positive, giving it a score of 4.0/5 and stating "Blood Incantation eschew the flash and pitfalls of modern death metal, displaying a deep appreciation for the roots and raw essence of the genre’s early ’90s heyday." Albert Mudrian of Decibel stated that it might be the best death metal album of the year. Jeff Terich of Decibel said that "It’s chock full of musical showmanship, yet that’s likely not what’ll bring listeners back. There’s a lot of detail and ear candy, but there’s also simply some great songs. All hail the riff, but praise be to melody." Metal Hammer's Oliver Badin awarded it a score of 4 out of 5 stars and said the album was "demanding but worth travelling across the galaxy for."

== Track listing ==
No.	Title	Length
1.	"Vitrification of Blood (Pt. 1)"	13:08
2.	"Chaoplasm"	5:31
3.	"Hidden Species (Vitrification of Blood Pt. 2)"	6:57
4.	"Meticulous Soul Devourment"	4:15
5.	"Starspawn"	4:19
Total length:		34:13

== Personnel ==
Blood Incantation

- Paul Riedl – vocals, guitars, keyboards
- Isaac Faulk – drums, percussion
- Morris Kolontyrsky – guitars
- Jeff Barrett – bass
