= The Golden Foretaste of Heaven =

Studio album by Alec Empire
- Released: November 28, 2007
- Genre: Electronic; Rock
- Label: Eat Your Heart Out Records
- Producer: Alec Empire; The Hellish Vortex

Alec Empire chronology
Futurist (2005)	The Golden Foretaste of Heaven (2007)

Singles from The Golden Foretaste of Heaven
- 1. "Robot L.O.V.E." Released: June 11, 2007; 2. "On Fire" Released: December 7, 2007; 3. "New Man" Released: TBA

Professional ratings
Review scores
Source	Rating
NME	(8/10)
Clash	6/10 stars

The Golden Foretaste of Heaven is an album by Alec Empire, released in Japan on November 28, 2007, and in Europe on January 18, 2008. It is his first on his newly established Eat Your Heart Out label. Unlike his previous, rock-oriented efforts post-Atari Teenage Riot (Intelligence and Sacrifice (CD1) and Futurist) this album is completely electronic (with vocals).

== Track listing ==
=== CD ===
1. "New Man" - 3:48
2. "If You Live or Die" - 3:44
3. "ICE (As If She Could Steal a Piece of My Glamour)" - 4:00
4. "1000 Eyes" - 7:18
5. "Down Satan Down" (Dub) - 3:30
6. "On Fire" (The Hellish Vortex Sessions) - 4:29
7. "Robot L.O.V.E." - 3:48
8. "Death Trap In 3D" - 3:21
9. "Bug On My Windshield" - 3:47
10. "No/Why/New York" - 4:19
11. "ICE" (dub)*
12. "Naginita"*

* Japanese version only, previously released on the "Robot L.O.V.E." single.

=== Digital download ===
Certain bonus tracks can be obtained exclusively through digital downloads. These include:

- "EYHO Beats"
- "No/Why/New York" (Eat Your Heart Out Minimal Remix)
- "Robot L.O.V.E." (Live in Cologne 10/2007)

== Release history ==
Country	Date
Japan	November 28, 2007
Europe	January 18, 2008
