= Blood Incantation =

American death metal band

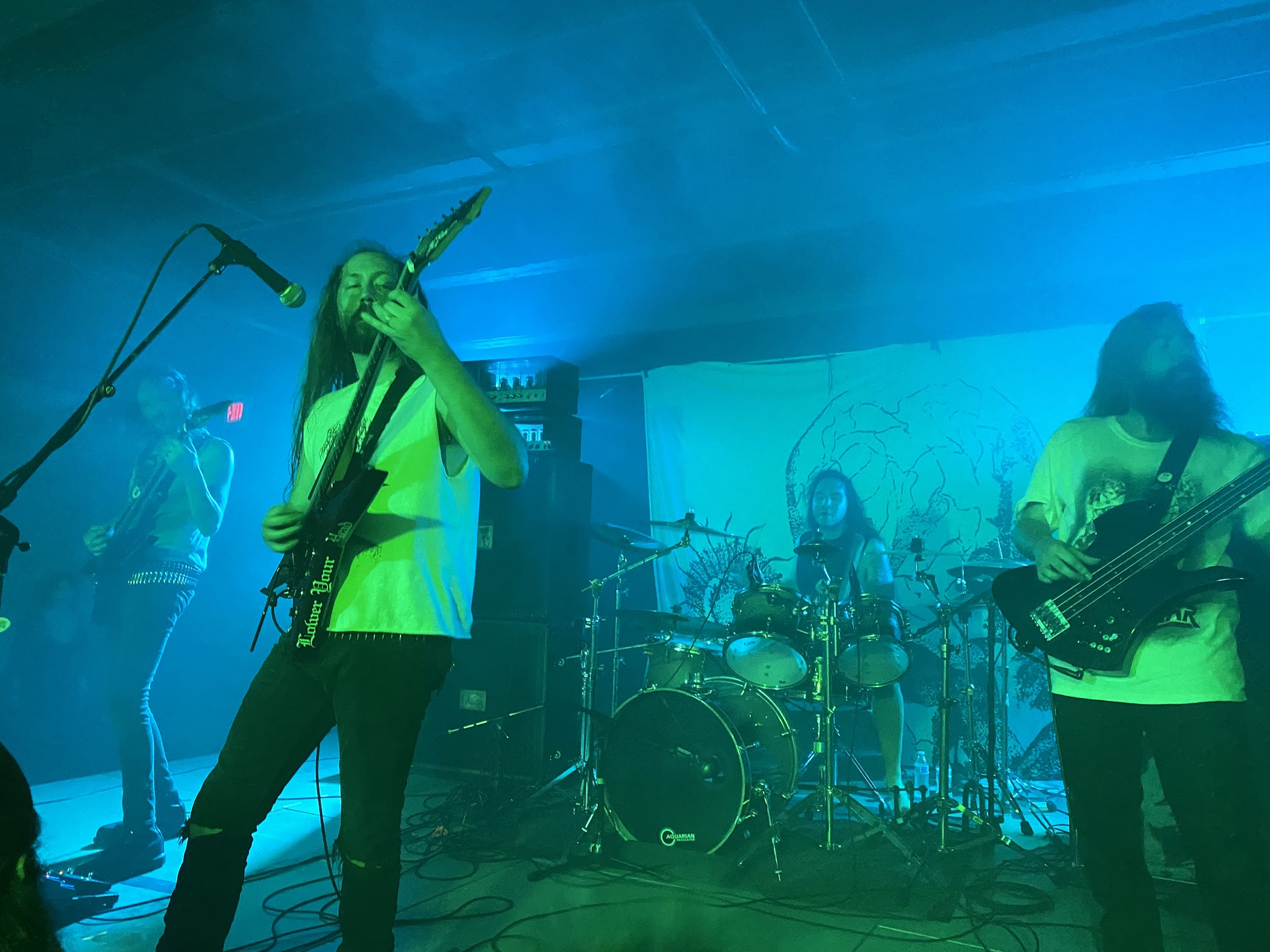
- Blood Incantation live in 2021

Background information
- Origin: Denver, Colorado, U.S.
- Genres: Death metal; progressive metal; technical death metal; psychedelic music; ambient
- Years active: 2011–present
- Label: Dark Descent
- Spinoffs: Spectral Voice
- Members: Isaac Faulk; Paul Riedl; Morris Kolontyrsky; Jeff Barrett
- Website: bloodincantation.org

Blood Incantation is an American extreme metal band from Denver, Colorado, formed in 2011. The band consists of guitarist and vocalist Paul Riedl, drummer Isaac Faulk, guitarist Morris Kolontyrsky and bassist Jeff Barrett.

== History ==
Blood Incantation's debut album, Starspawn, was released in 2016 through Dark Descent Records and received critical acclaim from music publications such as Decibel and Stereogum. They supported Immolation on their tour of North America in the fall of 2019. In the spring of 2023, they supported Obituary on their US tour along with Immolation and Ingrown. They also played at Milwaukee Metal Fest in May of that year. In the fall of 2023, they supported Cannibal Corpse on their North American tour along with Gorguts and Mayhem. In the summer of 2025, they toured North America with Krallice, Pallbearer, Steve Roach, and Cynic. They toured North America in the spring of 2026 with Emperor, and will tour there again in early 2027 with Meshuggah and Testament.

== Musical style and lyrical themes ==
The band's sound features "a psychedelic take on classic death metal" and melds "technicality with tectonic riffs, cavernous vocals and eerie, Dødsengel-like moments of caustic stillness." American online magazine BrooklynVegan has referred to the band as "psychedelic death metal" on multiple occasions. Stereogum also called them this, saying: "The mere idea of psychedelic death metal appears self-evidently contradictory, like eco-friendly corporations or compassionate conservatism. But Blood Incantation have figured out a fusion that makes sense." On the band's style, Aaron Lariviere of Stereogum wrote: "Screaming leads cut a swath through the churn of atonal rhythm guitars, blending the bright melodicism of late-period Death with the alien tones of Morbid Angel circa Domination." Later releases by the band incorporate elements of progressive music, krautrock and space rock. The band's lyrics mainly deal with topics such as space and death.

== Band members ==
- Paul Riedl – guitars, vocals (2011–present)
- Isaac Faulk – drums (2011–present)
- Morris Kolontyrsky – guitars (2012–present)
- Jeff Barrett – fretless bass (2015–present)

Live

- Nicklas Malmqvist – keyboards (2024)
- John Gamiño – keyboards, backing vocals (2025–present)

Timeline

== Discography ==
=== Studio albums ===
- Starspawn (2016)
- Hidden History of the Human Race (2019)
- Timewave Zero (2022)
- Absolute Elsewhere (2024)
- All Gates Open (Original Motion Picture Soundtrack) (2026)

=== EPs ===
- Interdimensional Extinction (2015)
- Live Vitrification (2018)
- Luminescent Bridge (2023)

=== Demos ===
- Blood Incantation (2013)
- Demo II (2013)
- Astral Spells (2014)

=== Split Releases ===
- Spectral Voice / Blood Incantation (2015)
