= Absolute Elsewhere =

Studio album by Blood Incantation
- Released: October 4, 2024
- Recorded: Summer 2023
- Studio: Hansa Tonstudio
- Genres: Progressive death metal; progressive metal; progressive rock
- Length: 43:39
- Label: Century Media
- Producer: Arthur Rizk

Blood Incantation chronology
Luminescent Bridge (2023)	Absolute Elsewhere (2024)

Singles from Absolute Elsewhere
- 1. "The Stargate" Released: September 27, 2024

Absolute Elsewhere is the fourth studio album by American death metal band Blood Incantation. It was released on October 4, 2024, through Century Media.

== Background ==
The album is named after the progressive rock group Absolute Elsewhere.

The album was recorded during the summer of 2023 at Hansa Tonstudio in Berlin. Arthur Rizk, who previously worked with the thrash metal band Power Trip, produced the album. The band stated in an interview that they hired an extra €9,000 worth of synth equipment to record the album. Lead singer and guitarist Paul Riedl stated "Absolute Elsewhere is our most potent audial extract/musical trip yet; like the soundtrack to a Herzog-style sci-fi epic about the history of/battle for human consciousness itself, via a '70s prog album played by a '90s death metal band from the future."

On September 27, 2024, the band released "The Stargate", the first song on the album, accompanied by a short film directed by Michael Ragen and produced by Mindy Kelly. The band released a 73-minute documentary titled All Gates Open: In Search Of Absolute Elsewhere alongside the album. Thorsten Quaeschning of the German electronic music band Tangerine Dream contributed synths to "The Stargate [Tablet II]".

== Musical style ==
The album has been described as death metal, progressive metal, and progressive rock. The album consists of two tracks, both exceeding 20 minutes in length. Each track is divided into three sections, called "tablets". The album is over 43 minutes long, making it the band's longest studio album to date.

== Reception ==
Professional ratings
Aggregate scores
Source	Rating
Metacritic	92/100
Review scores
Source	Rating
AllMusic	4.5/5 stars
Clash	9/10
Kerrang!	4/5
Metal Hammer	4.5/5 stars
Pitchfork	8.5/10

Absolute Elsewhere received widespread acclaim upon release. According to the review aggregator Metacritic, Absolute Elsewhere received "universal acclaim" based on a weighted average score of 92 out of 100 from 7 critic scores. It is the third highest rated music release of 2024 on the site, behind Brat and Songs of a Lost World.

Reviewing it for AllMusic, Paul Simpson described it as, "a headstrong rush of slashing riffs, complex time signatures, tripped-out growling, and wild, surreal left turns." and concluded, "Blood Incantation belong to the class of bands such as Gorguts, Demilich, and Sigh who push extreme metal far beyond its conventions, and Absolute Elsewhere is a towering achievement which exceeds all expectations."

Dom Lawson of Metal Hammer gave it four and a half stars, stating "Blood Incantation's new album is two songs long. It's also pure prog-death perfection and one of the best metal albums of 2024." Pitchfork's Sam Goldner gave it a score of 8.5/10, writing: "Just when it can't seem to get any bigger, it all gets swept away, echoing out to some arcane, far-off land, where fantasy is alive and the riffs roam free." Nick Russel of Kerrang! gave it a score of 4/5 and wrote "There are moments that do spooky, cunning, Morbid Angel-styled death metal better than Morbid Angel over the past decade, and there are bits, such as the second movement of Tablet II, that could have been written by Pink Floyd at their most cosmic."

=== Year-end lists ===
Select year-end rankings for Absolute Elsewhere
Publication/critic	Accolade	Rank	Ref.
Decibel	Top 40 Albums of 2024	2	
Exclaim!	50 Best Albums of 2024	12	
Metal Hammer	Top 50 Albums of 2024	1	
Pitchfork	The 50 Best Albums of 2024	34	
Stereogum	The 50 Best Albums of 2024	26	
Time Out	The Best Albums of 2024	11	

== Track listing ==
No.	Title	Length
1.	"The Stargate": I. "The Stargate [Tablet I]"; II. "The Stargate [Tablet II]"; III. "The Stargate [Tablet III]"	20:18: 8:20; 5:08; 6:50
2.	"The Message": I. "The Message [Tablet I]"; II. "The Message [Tablet II]"; III. "The Message [Tablet III]"	23:21: 5:56; 5:58; 11:27
Total length:		43:39

== Personnel ==
Blood Incantation

- Paul Riedl – all vocals; lead, rhythm and acoustic guitars; additional synthesizers and mellotron
- Morris Kolontyrsky – lead, rhythm and acoustic guitars; additional sythesizers
- Jeff Barrett – acoustic and electric fretless basses; additional synthesizers
- Isaac Faulk – all drums, gongs and percussion; additional guitars and mellotron

Session musicians

- Thorsten Quaeschning – lead synthesizers, mellotron and programming on "The Stargate [Tablet II]"
- Nicklas Malmqvist – lead synthesizers, mellotron, organ and pianos throughout all Tablets
- Malte Gericke – clean vocals on "The Stargate [Tablet III]" and "The Message [Tablets II and III]"

Production

- Blood Incantation – production
- Arthur Rizk – production

== Charts ==
Chart performance for Absolute Elsewhere
Chart (2024)	Peak position
Austrian Albums (Ö3 Austria)	17
Belgian Albums (Ultratop Flanders)	78
Belgian Albums (Ultratop Wallonia)	95
Croatian International Albums (HDU)	21
Dutch Albums (Album Top 100)	94
Finnish Albums (Suomen virallinen lista)	42
German Albums (Offizielle Top 100)	20
Polish Albums (ZPAV)	67
Portuguese Albums (AFP)	81
Swedish Physical Albums (Sverigetopplistan)	18
Scottish Albums (Official Charts)	37
Swiss Albums (Schweizer Hitparade)	16
UK Album Downloads (Official Charts)	15
UK Rock & Metal Albums (Official Charts)	3

Chart (2025–2026)	Peak position
Greek Albums (IFPI)	59
