= Funk Riot Beat =

Album by Alec Empire

Funk Beat Riot

Studio album by Death Funk
- Released: 1997
- Label: Digital Hardcore Recordings
- Producer: Alec Empire

Funk Beat Riot is an album by Alec Empire under the alias "Death Funk".

== Track listing ==
=== CD ===
1. "Down with the Shit"
2. "Crystal"
3. "The New World Order"
4. "Hard Like It's a Pose"
5. "Beating Up the B's"
6. "Rip Your Brain Out"
7. "Moon Explosion"
8. "Don't Mess Up with Me"
9. "The Trace of Soul (Pt.1)"
10. "The Trace of Soul (Pt.2)"
11. "Slow Hinduism"
12. "Rippin Up"*

* Unlisted on the album cover, track 12 is an alternate extended version of "Hard Like It's a Pose". Then name "Rippin Up" appears on the track downloaded from the official Digital Hardcore Recordings mp3 store.

=== 12" vinyl ===
Side A

1. "Down with the Shit"
2. "Crystal"
3. "The New World Order"
4. "Ward Like It's a Pose"
5. "Beating Up the B's"
6. "Rip Your Brain Out"

Side B

1. "Moon Explosion"
2. "Don't Mess Up with Me"
3. "The Trace of Soul (Pt.1)"
4. "The Trace of Soul (Pt.2)"
5. "Slow Hinduism"
