= Fashion victim =

Person who overindulges in a fad

"Fashion victim" is a term claimed to have been coined by Oscar de la Renta that is used to identify a person who is unable to identify commonly recognized boundaries of style.

Fashion victims are "victims" because they are vulnerable to faddishness and materialism, two of the widely recognized excesses of fashion, and consequently are at the mercy of society's prejudices or of the commercial interest of the fashion industry, or of both. According to Versace, "When a woman alters her look too much from season to season, she becomes a fashion victim."

== Faddishness ==
A fad is an intense but short-lived fashion trend. Fads are also by their nature at the extreme range of currently acceptable style, which means they commonly cross the line from the sublime to the ridiculous. Fashion victims can be seen to have crossed this line.

== Materialism ==
Keeping up with fashion is often very expensive. Expensive clothes signal that the wearers are financially successful, but they aren't necessarily "cool" or "fashionable".

Designer labels have come to form an important part of identification of style and fashion. Many have become accustomed to the social acceptance that comes with wearing the right brands. The labels have in many cases migrated from the inside of a garment to the outside. Common examples of this type of branding are Adidas, Kelme, and other sports and leisurewear manufacturers. A fashion victim, able to recognise this phenomenon but unable to determine its boundary, may become a "walking billboard".

Designer branding is sometimes associated with a higher quality of manufacture and a higher price. The ownership and display of such products of quality is frequently marketed to suggest that the wearer will automatically embody a personal characteristic of quality by association. Designers have identified this and in some cases are able to exploit it to the extent that prices can be escalated to surprising proportions without reference to the cost of manufacture. Extreme examples of this type of branding are found among accessory manufacturers such as Versace, Gucci and Burberry, scent manufacturers such as Chanel and Guerlain and watch manufacturers such as Rolex and Bulgari.

Fashion victims, by their characteristic inability to recognize boundaries, may aspire to the extreme end of what is available, seeking expensive products (or copies of these products), believing that the outward display of such items will draw admiration in proportion to their actual or apparent cost. Because of this, "the term 'fashion victim' became the ultimate insult to the aspirational."

In the Cameroonian artist Alioum Moussa's solo art exhibition Fashion Victims, he described fashion victimization as "global games of seduction". He states that such process drains people's unique identities and exacerbates the unfair dynamics created by capitalist interaction.

== See also ==
- Fast fashion
- Nouveau riche
- Keeping up with the Joneses
