= Low on Ice (The Iceland Sessions) =

Studio album by Alec Empire
- Released: 18 December 1995
- Recorded: 4–7 August 1995, Iceland
- Genre: Ambient techno; experimental
- Length: 59:59
- Label: Mille Plateaux
- Producer: Alec Empire

Alec Empire chronology
Generation Star Wars (1994)	Low on Ice (The Iceland Sessions) (1995)	Hypermodern Jazz (1996)

Professional ratings
Review scores
Source	Rating
AllMusic	4/5 stars

Low on Ice (The Iceland Sessions) (commonly known as just Low on Ice) is the second solo studio album by German electronic artist Alec Empire, the third of five of his to be released on the Mille Plateaux label. Issued in 1995, Empire recorded the album over three days in August that same year during a tour of Iceland with his band Atari Teenage Riot. Primarily written outdoors in tents and recorded onto analog tapes, the record is noted for its ambient overtone, something not commonly associated with Empire's music.

Plans were announced of a triple-CD reissue containing unreleased archive material, this deluxe reissue was released in December 2020 through Alec Empire's website as Low on Ice (The Trilogy). An NFT edition featuring the same track list and different cover art was released later through OpenSea. "22:24", "Low on Ice", "metall Dub" and both untitled tracks would later be included on the compilation album The Geist of Alec Empire.

== Track listing ==
All tracks are written by Alec Empire.

Disc One: Low On Ice
No.	Title	Length
1.	"37.2 Pt.1"	7:23
2.	Untitled	6:44
3.	"20 (1)"	4:09
4.	"20 (2)"	2:17
5.	"22:24"	6:24
6.	Untitled	6:24
7.	"Low on Ice"	7:55
8.	"Metall Dub"	7:00
9.	"2572"	4:20
10.	"We Were Burnt"	4:13
11.	"37.2 Pt.2" (not included in deluxe edition)	0:56
Total length:		59:59

Disc Two: The Precipice
No.	Title	Length
1.	"The Report"	7:11
2.	"her shadows"	5:15
3.	"ce:isir"	8:35
4.	"d ew"	8:37
5.	"Metall Dub Zwei"	5:03
6.	"8:03am"	5:03
7.	"Eruption"	7:37
8.	"wolfs mensch"	13:22
9.	"error control"	4:30
Total length:		65:13

Disc Three: The White Zone
No.	Title	Length
1.	"Verusche Radio Signal"	8:26
2.	"icicles"	6:36
3.	"as the temperature decreased"	9:30
4.	"Todesstarre"	2:45
5.	"it found a host"	10:29
6.	"Verloren"	6:31
Total length:		44:17; 169:29 (total)
