= Miss Black America (album) =

Studio album by Alec Empire
- Released: 1999
- Recorded: August 1998
- Studio: DHR Studios (Berlin, Germany)
- Genre: Digital hardcore, noise
- Label: Digital Hardcore Recordings DHR LTD CD 009
- Producer: Alec Empire

Alec Empire chronology
The Geist of Alec Empire (1997)	Miss Black America (1999)	Alec Empire vs. Elvis Presley (1999)

Professional ratings
Review scores
Source	Rating
NME	favorable

Miss Black America is the sixth solo studio album by German producer Alec Empire, originally released through his Digital Hardcore Recordings label as a part of its DHR Limited series of single pressing albums. Recorded throughout August 1998 in between sessions for Atari Teenage Riots 60 Second Wipeout, the album was produced in response to the political climate of Germany at the time.

The band Miss Black America took their name from this album.

== Track listing ==
All tracks are written by Alec Empire

Side A
No.	Title	Length
1.	"DFO2"	3:14
2.	"Black Sabbath"	3:39
3.	"The Nazi Comets"	3:23
4.	"It Should Be You Not Me!"	5:51
5.	"They Landed Inside My Head While We Were Driving in the Taxi up to 53rd Street and Took Over!"	3:59

Side B
No.	Title	Length
6.	"The Robot Put a Voodoospell on Me"	7:32
7.	"I Can Hear the Winds of Saturn"	6:24
8.	"We Take Your Pain Away"	3:15
9.	Untitled	5:58
Total length:		43:15

CD bonus track
No.	Title	Length
10.	"Blood and Snow"	5:17
Total length:		48:32
