= Futurist (Alec Empire album) =

Studio album by Alec Empire
- Released: March 28, 2005
- Length: 42:23; 50:43 (re-issue)
- Label: Digital Hardcore Recordings
- Producer: Alec Empire

Alec Empire chronology
The CD2 Sessions (2003)	Futurist (2005)	The Golden Foretaste of Heaven (2007)

Professional ratings
Review scores
Source	Rating
NME	(5/10)
Kerrang!	(4/5)
Pitchfork Media	(3.7/10)

Futurist is an album by Alec Empire, released in 2005. It is the follow-up to 2001's Intelligence and Sacrifice and is notable for the fact that the use of electronics for which Empire is famed is reduced in favour of guitars and drum beats, giving the album more of a punk/metal sound than its predecessor.

== Track listing ==
1. "Kiss of Death" – 3:33
2. "Night of Violence" – 3:31
3. "Overdose" – 3:59
4. "Gotta Get Out" – 3:29
5. "Point of No Return" – 3:36
6. "Vertigo" – 3:03
7. "Make Em Bleed" – 3:13
8. "Hunt You Down" – 3:49
9. "Uproar" – 2:30
10. "In Disguise" – 3:45
11. "Terror Alert: High" – 3:39
12. "XXV3" – 4:06

== Singles ==
Thus far, two singles have been released from Futurist: "Gotta Get Out" and "Kiss of Death". It was stated by DHR in 2005 that there would be four collectors edition singles to accompany the album .

=== "Gotta Get Out" ===
==== CD ====
1. "Gotta Get Out"
2. "On Fire"
3. "Overdose" (Remix)

=== "Kiss of Death" ===
==== CD ====
1. "Kiss of Death"
2. "Night of Violence" (Futurist Remix)
3. "XXV3"

==== Vinyl (Red 7") ====
1. "Kiss of Death"
2. "Uproar"
