= Jonathan Miles (cricketer) =

English cricketer

Personal information
- Full name: Jonathan Samuel Miles
- Born: 21 February 1986 (age 40); Sutton Coldfield, Warwickshire, England
- Nickname: Milo, Milesy
- Height: 6 ft 2 in (1.88 m)
- Batting: Right-handed
- Bowling: Left-arm medium

Domestic team information
- Years: Team
- 2010–2011: Unicorns
- 2010: Norfolk
- 2008: Marylebone Cricket Club
- 2005–2007: Lincolnshire

Career statistics
Competition	List A
Matches	14
Runs scored	18
Batting average	18.00
100s/50s	–/–
Top score	6
Balls bowled	545
Wickets	12
Bowling average	47.91
5 wickets in innings	–
10 wickets in match	–
Best bowling	3/49
Catches/stumpings	2/–
- Source: Cricinfo, 24 November 2011

Jonathan Samuel Miles (born 21 February 1986) is an English cricketer. Miles is a right-handed batsman who bowls left-arm medium pace. He was born at Sutton Coldfield, Warwickshire.

Miles made his debut for Lincolnshire in the 2005 Minor Counties Championship against Cambridgeshire. He played Minor counties cricket for Lincolnshire from 2005 to 2007, making 14 Minor Counties Championship and six MCCA Knockout Trophy appearances. He joined the MCC Young Cricketers programme in 2008, and in that same season he made his List A debut for the Marylebone Cricket Club against Bangladesh A at The Racecourse, Durham. In Bangladesh A's innings, he took the wickets of Tamim Iqbal and Nazimuddin, finishing with figures of 2/44 from nine overs.

The 2010 season saw Miles play for Norfolk, with him making four appearances for the county in that seasons Minor Counties Championship. In that same season he also signed for the Unicorns team which would take part in the 2010 Clydesdale Bank 40, a team formed of players without current full-time contracts with one of the regular first-class counties. He made his List A debut for the team against Sussex. Miles has made twelve further List A appearances for the team, the last of which came against Gloucestershire in the 2011 Clydesdale Bank 40. In his thirteen appearances for the Unicorns, he has taken a total of 10 wickets at an average of 53.10, with best figures of 3/49. In 2014 Jonathan signed For Billingborough Horbling and Threekingham CC for their first season in the ECB Lincs Prem League. In 2023 Jonathan was named 1st XI captain for Hagley Cricket Club in Worcestershire Division 1.
