= Jonathan Miles (filmmaker) =

British independent filmmaker

Jonathan Miles is a British independent filmmaker. He studied at Surrey Institute of Art & Design. Early in his career he directed music videos, for instance The Ride with Alec Empire. His short film The Queue from 2007 has been shown at a number of film festivals, in particular The End of the Pier International Film Festival, where it won the award for Best Comedy Short 2008. In addition to directing he has worked as a documentary editor on BBC films. He now lives in Berlin.
