= Alec Empire vs. Elvis Presley =

Studio album by Alec Empire
- Released: 1999
- Recorded: 1998
- Genre: Digital hardcore
- Length: 31:07
- Label: El Turco Loco
- Producer: Alec Empire

Alec Empire chronology
Miss Black America (1999)	Alec Empire vs. Elvis Presley (1999)	Intelligence and Sacrifice (2001)

Professional ratings
Review scores
Source	Rating
NME	(8/10)

Alec Empire vs. Elvis Presley is a recording by Alec Empire which incorporates Elvis Presley samples.

== The recording ==
Empire recorded vs. Elvis in 1998 after returning home to Berlin from a tour of the United States with his band Atari Teenage Riot. As a method of escape from the digital hardcore sound he became interested in Presley, watching all of his movies. Inspired, he collected two hours' worth of samples and mixed them in his own particular style, the result of which caused his girlfriend at the time to leave him.

== The release ==
Originally intended for release on his DHR Limited label, Empire ran into problems when attempting to release the album as the Elvis samples were used without permission from the Presley Foundation. Concerned at the prospect of legal action Empire decided not to release vs. Elvis on DHR, and instead pressed a few copies for friends and DJs. In a record store in New York in 1999, Empire to his surprise discovered a vinyl copy of the recording that had been pressed by El Turco Loco ("The Mad Turk"), an obscure label owned by former Matador Records artist Khan.

The album is long out of print, but copies have occasionally been sold on eBay, as well as exchanged in MP3 format on p2p networks. Since the release is a bootleg, the track listing of the recording seems to in the incorrect order (i.e. the song "Last Message From The Soul" seems to be an introduction track) and back cover claims to be "recorded in the highest quality" but the sound is very poor. This recording also marks the end of Alec Empire's usuage of the popular drum sample the Amen break, as he stated in interviews that it had been done to death and was using similar fashion to Presley's death on this album.

The album has been made available for purchase as a digital download in the Hellish Vortex Online Shop.

A video was made for the track "You Ain't Nothing" by Empire's friend and collaborator Philipp "Virus" Reichenheim (link).

== Track listing ==
#	Title	Length	Notes
1	"Jailhouse Cock Rocks the Most"	3:32	Samples "Jailhouse Rock"
2	"You Ain't Nothing"	3:00	Samples "Hound Dog"
3	"Something For The Pain"	4:16	Samples "Maybellene"
4	"Take Away"	2:59	Samples "They Remind Me Too Much of You"
5	"Come On, Fight You Punk!"	2:38	Samples "Long Tall Sally"
6	"I am Going Insane Without Your Love"	3:26	
7	"He's Dead, That's the Way It Is"	3:35	Samples the trailer for the documentary Elvis: That's the Way It Is
8	"Last Message From The Soul"	2:00	Interlude, samples music from the Game Boy Camera photography menu
9	"Fuck the Majors"	0:46	Interlude, samples the film Jailhouse Rock
10	"Blue Moon"	3:56	Samples "Blue Moon of Kentucky"
