= Limited Editions 1990–94 =

Compilation album by Alec Empire
- Released: 1994
- Recorded: February 23, 1990 – January 30, 1994
- Genre: Abstract; Ambient; Techno
- Length: 72:00
- Label: Mille Plateaux
- Producer: Alec Empire

Alec Empire chronology
| Limited Editions 1990–94 (1994) | Generation Star Wars (1994) |

Professional ratings
Review scores
| Source | Rating |
|---|---|
| Allmusic | 3/5 stars |

Limited Editions 1990–94 is the first album release by German electronic musician Alec Empire. Released in 1994 on Mille Plateaux, it is a compilation of tracks previously issued on vinyl by that sublabel's parent, Force Inc., between 1990 and 1994.

== Track listing ==
All tracks are written by Alec Empire

| No. | Title | Length |
|---|---|---|
| 1. | "SuEcide" (previously released on SuEcide Pt. 1) | 6:34 |
| 2. | "Sweet" | 6:09 |
| 3. | "The Sun Hurts My Eyes" | 12:06 |
| 4. | "The Backside of My Brain" | 7:58 |
| 5. | "Dark Woman" | 5:22 |
| 6. | "Silver Box" | 3:23 |
| 7. | "Chinese Takeaway" | 5:01 |
| 8. | "Civilization Virus" (Original Motion Picture Soundtrack) | 13:30 |
| 9. | "When Love Disappears" | 8:19 |
| 10. | "Limited 05" | 3:32 |
