= Les Étoiles des Filles Mortes =

Studio album by Alec Empire
- Released: November 1996
- Genre: Electronic; Musique concrète
- Label: Mille Plateaux
- Producer: Alec Empire

Alec Empire chronology
The Destroyer (1996)	Les Étoiles des Filles Mortes (1996)	Squeeze the Trigger (1997)

'Les Étoiles des Filles Mortes' is an album by Alec Empire, released in 1996. It is his fifth and final album for the Mille Plateaux label and his third of three albums released that year.

== Track listing ==
1. "La Ville des Filles Mortes" - 5:41
2. "Les Enfants de la Lune" - 4:21
3. "La Conséquence, C'est la Révolte" - 4:46
4. "Le Mur Noir" - 3:07
5. "J'ai Tué les Fictions" - 3:48
6. "Le Marriage" - 2:27
7. "Les Yeux Electroniques" - 2:26
8. "Opus 28; Pour la Liberté des Mille Universes" - 6:09
9. "La Révolution Obligatoire" - 4:59
10. "La Guerre d'Opium" - 6:10

== Translations ==
Les Étoiles des Filles Mortes means "Stars of the Dead Girls." Here is some more literal translations from the French titles.

1. "The City of the Dead Girls"
2. "The Children of the Moon"
3. "Revolt is the Consequence"
4. "The Black Wall"
5. "I've Killed the Fictions"
6. "The Wedding"
7. "The Electronic Eyes"
8. "Opus 28; For the Freedom of the Thousand Universes"
9. "The Obligatory Revolution"
10. "The Opium War"
