= Intelligence and Sacrifice =

Studio album by Alec Empire
- Released: November 2001
- Recorded: 2001
- Label: Digital Hardcore Recordings
- Producer: Alec Empire

Alec Empire chronology
Alec Empire vs. Elvis Presley (1999)	Intelligence and Sacrifice (2001)	Death Favours the Enemy (2002)

Singles from Intelligence and Sacrifice
- 1. "New World Order EP" Released: 2001; 2. "Addicted to You" Released: 2002; 3. "The Ride" Released: 2002

Professional ratings
Review scores
Source	Rating
NME	(8/10)

Intelligence and Sacrifice is a 2001 album by German recording artist Alec Empire. While by no means his first solo album, it was his first full album since the demise of his former band Atari Teenage Riot, and he regarded it as a new beginning, stating that it "feels like this is my first real album". This recording consists of two CDs, each with a significantly different sound. CD 1 is somewhat consistent with the ATR formula while the second disc (printed on the album cover as CD²) is entirely electronic with negligible use of vocals.

== Track listing ==
=== CD 1 - Intelligence and Sacrifice ===
1. "Path of Destruction" – 4:29
2. "The Ride" – 3:49
3. "Tear It Out" (Remix) – 1:56
4. "Everything Starts with a Fuck" – 4:28
5. "Killing Machine" – 5:11
6. "Addicted to You" – 3:51
7. "Intelligence and Sacrifice" – 3:39
8. "Death Favours the Enemy" – 3:50
9. "Buried Alive" – 3:06
10. "...And Never Be Found" – 4:21
11. "New World Order" – 13:53
- On some pressings of the album, "Everything Starts with a Fuck", "Killing Machine" and "New World Order" are each split into two parts on separate tracks.

=== CD^{2} ===
1. "2641998" – 29:57
2. "The Cat Women of the Moon" – 7:27
3. "Two Turntables and a Moog" – 3:54
4. "Parallel Universe" – 5:23
5. "Vault Things of the Night" – 5:22
6. "Silence and Burning Ice" – 5:34
7. "Alec's Ladder" – 4:55
8. "Electric Bodyrock" – 6:19
9. "2641998" – 4:01

== Samples ==
- "Addicted to You" samples the motion picture The Matrix.
- "Death Favours the Enemy" samples "Twist the Knife" by Napalm Death.
- "Everything Starts With A Fuck" samples "Rise" by Pantera.
- "Killing Machine" samples "Problems" by The Sex Pistols
- "Buried Alive" samples "Silent Scream" by Slayer.
- "Intelligence and Sacrifice" samples "Ultra" by KMFDM.

== Notes ==
- "Tear It Out" (Remix) is an alternate version of a track originally intended for Dave Grohl's Probot project. The project consisted of instrumental tracks recorded by Grohl, with vocals provided by several well-known heavy metal singers. When Probot was finally released, Empire's contribution was not used. Instead, the track was re-recorded with new lyrics and vocals by Mike Dean of Corrosion of Conformity and it became known as "Access Babylon".
