= Alec Empire =

German experimental electronic musician

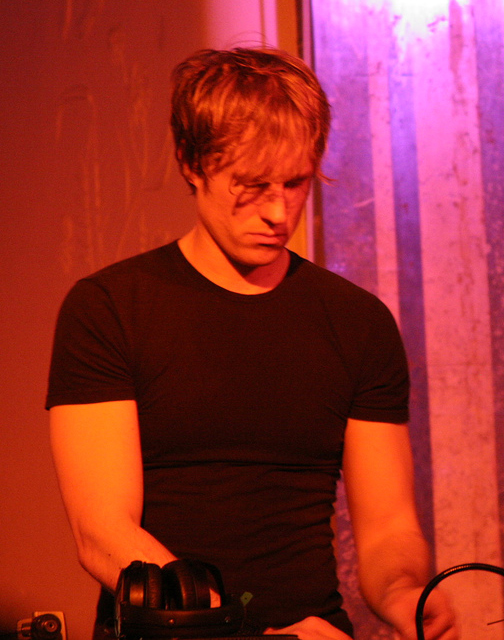
- Alec Empire DJing at Throbbing Gristle's 2005–2006 New Year's Eve party

Background information
- Also known as: Alexander Wilke; Death Funk; DJ 6666 feat. The Illegals; DJ Mowgly; E.C.P.; Jaguar; LX Empire; Naomi Campbell; Nero; Nintendo Teenage Robots; P.J.P.; Richard Benson; Wipe Out
- Born: Alexander Wilke-Steinhof; 2 May 1972 (age 54); Charlottenburg, West Berlin, West Germany
- Genres: Digital hardcore; experimental; electronic; hardcore techno; noise
- Occupations: Musician; producer; DJ
- Instruments: Vocals; guitar; synthesizer; sampler; drum machine; mixer
- Years active: 1990–present
- Labels: Digital Hardcore Recordings; Eat Your Heart Out Records; Grand Royal; Phonogram; Force Inc.; Mille Plateaux; Geist Recordings; Riot Beats
- Member of: Atari Teenage Riot
- Formerly of: The Curse of the Golden Vampire

Alec Empire (born Alexander Wilke-Steinhof on 2 May 1972) is a German experimental electronic musician who is best known as a founding member of the band Atari Teenage Riot, as well as a solo artist, producer and DJ. He has released many albums, EPs and singles, some under aliases, and remixed over seventy tracks for various artists including Björk. He was also the driving force behind the creation of the digital hardcore genre, and founded the record labels Digital Hardcore Recordings and Eat Your Heart Out Records.

== Biography ==
Wilke's father was a working-class socialist, himself the son of a radical activist who perished in the Nazi concentration camps of World War II. His maternal grandfather, Karl Steinhof, was a self-made millionaire who patented the first domestic hand-knitting appliance during the economic boom in Germany in the 1950s.

Wilke grew up during the Cold War near the Berlin Wall, which he passed every day on his way to school. The frequent sight of patrol guards with guns influenced his outlook on life from an early age. He describes Berlin at the time as: "Probably the most left radical place in Germany in the 70s, terrorists, a lot of demonstrations, and probably the first address to hear the latest American music, because of the radio shows the US soldiers brought to Berlin."

=== Early influences and career ===
At the age of ten, Wilke's love of hip hop led to a vogueing career on the streets of Berlin. Later disillusioned by that genre becoming increasingly commercial, he left it behind in favour of a completely different form of musical expression. He had played guitar since the age of eight which coupled with his politically charged upbringing eventually led him to punk music; he formed his first band, Die Kinder (The Kids), at age twelve.

By sixteen, however, Wilke came to believe that the punk movement was "dead" (though the anti-establishment punk attitude would figure significantly in his subsequent output). After leaving Die Kinder, he began listening to classical music and experimenting with electronic instruments. He eventually became fascinated by the rave scene, and, following German reunification, frequented underground raves in East Berlin, believing his native West Berlin scene to be too commercialised. Known earlier in his career as LX Empire he produced a great deal of what he refers to as "faceless DJ music". In 1991, while DJing on a beach in France with his friend Hanin Elias, he caught the attention of Ian Pooley, which led to the release of a number of 12" records on the Force Inc. label.

Although Empire was a prolific producer and DJ at this time, and made a comfortable enough living, he nevertheless saw the rave scene as decadent and selfish. This angered him, as he and his friends lived in a city embroiled in politics, and the demise of communist-led governments had given rise to increased conservatism in Germany, whilst few people cared. The German neo-Nazi movement had invaded the scene, declaring trance techno "true German music".

Empire retaliated by utilising samples of 1960s and 1970s funk – a predominantly black style of music – in his solo work. In order to further spread the message, he gathered like-minded individuals Hanin Elias (also a former punk) and Carl Crack (a Swazi MC) to form a band. In 1992, the trio became known as Atari Teenage Riot (ATR).

=== Atari Teenage Riot and Digital Hardcore Recordings ===
In Empire's words, Atari Teenage Riot's complex musical style was intended to "destroy" the "simulated harmony" of the mainstream electronic music, and that, besides their protest lyrics, "riot sound produce riots". Empire, who is straight edge, also stated that it was a reaction to both the fashion-victimized and drug-fueled nihilism of the rave scene of the 1990s, once saying that "You can't read or do anything else while listening to our music."

ATR signed a record deal with Phonogram, a major UK label, in 1993. The two parted ways after only a couple of single releases, due to the band's refusal to play by the label's rules. In 1994, using the non-refundable cash advance from the deal, Empire started an independent record label that allowed its artists the freedom of expression Phonogram were unlikely to give. He named it Digital Hardcore Recordings (DHR); the direction his sound had taken came to be known as "digital hardcore". That year, DHR released EPs by EC8OR, Sonic Subjunkies, and Empire himself.

While working with ATR, Empire continued steadily with his solo output. He recorded for Force Inc. under several pseudonyms, including the Detroit techno-inspired Jaguar. He also recorded several albums for Force Inc.'s experimental sub-label Mille Plateaux, including Generation Star Wars (his first full solo album) and Low on Ice, which he recorded entirely on his laptop during a three-day tour of Iceland with ATR. In 1995, ATR released their first proper album, Delete Yourself!, on DHR, and, in 1996, Empire released his first solo album for DHR, The Destroyer. In that year, Empire and Mike D signed a deal to release a number of DHR's recordings on the Beastie Boys' Grand Royal record label in the United States.

ATR spent the next few years touring the world with artists such as Jon Spencer Blues Explosion, Beck, Rage Against the Machine, the Wu-Tang Clan and Ministry, as well as headlining shows as the Digital Hardcore festival at CBGB's in New York City in 1998, and the Queen Elizabeth Hall show in London in 1999 at the request of fan John Peel. During this time they introduced Nic Endo to their ranks as a fourth member.

All of the members found some comfort in their solo work – Empire's output at this time would include his sole release as Nintendo Teenage Robots, and the bootleg recording Alec Empire vs. Elvis Presley, as well as remixes for the likes of The Mad Capsule Markets, Mogwai and Thurston Moore. However, ATR's problems worsened. Onstage at one show in Seattle in 1999, Empire slashed his forearms with a razor. At another show that year in London, in which ATR supported Nine Inch Nails, the band dispensed with the usual song-based formula and delivered one long barrage of what could only be described as "noise"; this would later be released as Live at Brixton Academy.

By the end of 1999, Empire was mentally exhausted, Elias was pregnant and Crack was suffering from psychosis induced by prolonged drug use. The band was put on hiatus; its future was made even more doubtful following Crack's death in 2001, and Elias' decision to leave DHR and create Fatal Recordings.

=== After ATR ===
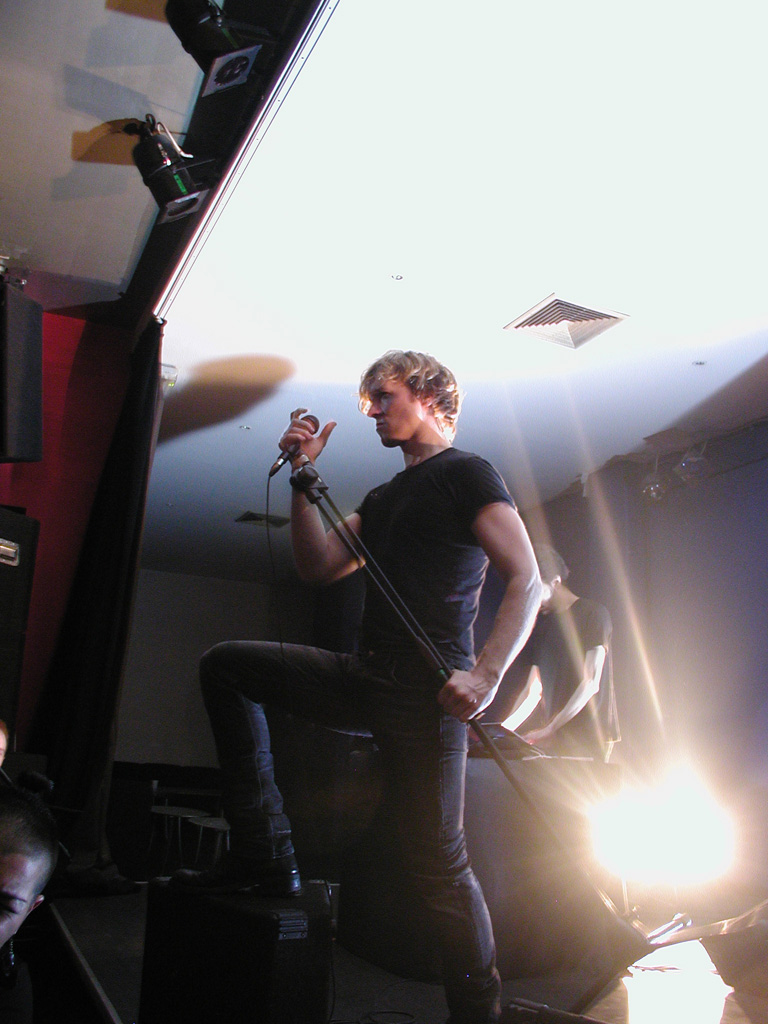
Alec Empire performing live in Prato, Italy, on 13 January 2007

Empire rebounded in 2001 when he, with assistance from Endo, recorded Intelligence and Sacrifice. The album contained two discs: the first retained the ATR formula, yet exhibited a more polished production style and lyrics of an unusually introspective nature; the second disc was an electronic instrumental album, and in contrast was more experimental. He used an all-star lineup in his first live "Alec Empire" show at the Fuji Rock Festival in Japan: Charlie Clouser (ex-Nine Inch Nails) played synths, Masami "Merzbow" Akita and Gabe Serbian (The Locust) both played drums, and Endo played synths and keyboards.

Empire's next lineup would include a guitarist, Robbie Furze, who would later record for DHR with Panic DHH. Empire also played a series of live shows performing material from the second disc of Intelligence and Sacrifice; one of these was released as The CD2 Sessions in 2003. He returned in 2005 with Futurist, which was less electronic than its predecessor and had more of a raw punk-rock sound, albeit assisted by drum machines and some processing.

Empire began 2006 by DJing at industrial pioneers Throbbing Gristle's New Year's Eve party. During that year he remixed fellow Germans Rammstein (whom he once said were "successful for all the wrong reasons") and New York hardcore band Most Precious Blood. He also recorded a cover version of The Monks' "Monk Time" for a tribute album with that band's singer Gary Burger, and Russell Simins of Blues Explosion. Atari Teenage Riot: 1992-2000, a retrospective album, was released by DHR on 3 July 2006.

=== After DHR ===
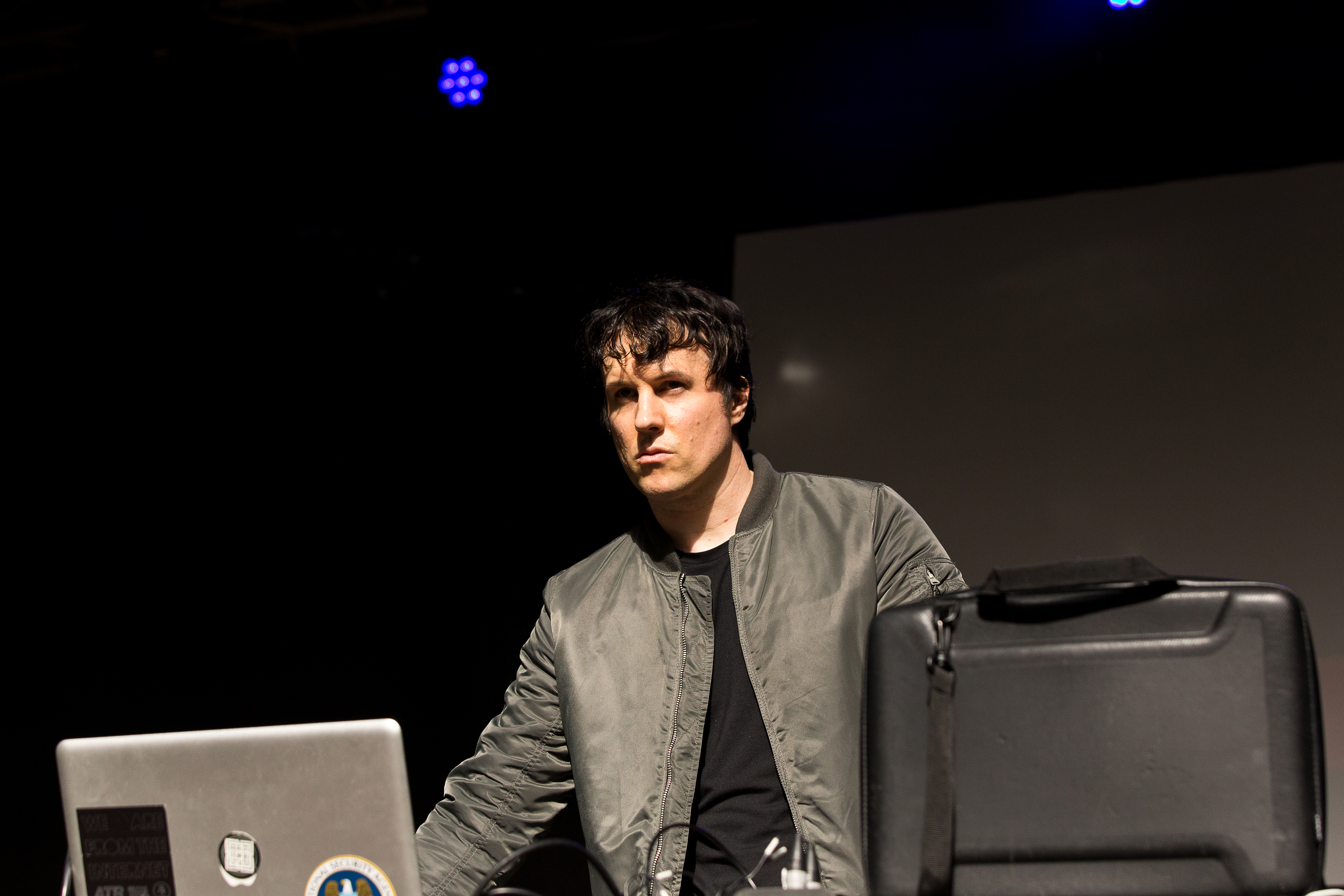
Alec Empire at Nocturnal Culture Night festival 2016

In 2007, Empire announced that DHR would henceforth assume a more "underground" role, as his focus turned to a new label, Eat Your Heart Out Records, which he describes as "the sound of New Berlin". The label's first release was his 12" single "Robot L.O.V.E.", followed by an album, The Golden Foretaste of Heaven, recorded with his new production team and touring band The Hellish Vortex, released in Japan on 28 November 2007 and in Europe on 21 January 2008. The second single release, the On Fire EP, was released on 7 December. Sixteen Years of Video Material, a DVD featuring rare footage of Empire and ATR was released on German video label Monitorpop in July 2008.

In February 2017 Empire released an original soundtrack album for the German sci-fi thriller Volt.

== Style ==
Alec Empire's body of work spans a range of electronic (as well as conventionally less electronic) styles. His earlier releases for Force Inc. were influenced by the rave scene in his native Berlin, and included acid house, techno, hardcore, punk and breakbeat (all of which are evident on the SuEcide EPs and the Limited Editions 1990-1994 compilation). On creating DHR his solo recordings for that label consisted largely of the digital hardcore staples of breakcore (as heard on The Destroyer album and EPs) and later experimental noise (as heard on Miss Black America), while his work during the same period for Mille Plateaux saw him experimenting with minimal techno (Pulse Code), ambient (Low on Ice) and musique concrète (Les Étoiles des Filles Mortes). His alter-egos for various labels provided outlets for dabbling in other genres such as drum and bass/jungle (DJ Mowgly), Detroit techno (Jaguar) and even chiptune music (Nintendo Teenage Robots).

After the demise of Atari Teenage Riot, Empire's major releases for DHR sought to continue in the guitar-based, punk-influenced vein of the band. Intelligence and Sacrifice utilised live guitars, breakbeats, noise, sampled cinematic dialogue and Empire's trademark spoken/shouted English vocals, while Futurist saw a more obvious return to his punk roots and consequently sounds as if it were largely recorded using all live instrumentation, even though it was electronically produced. The creation of the Eat Your Heart Out label saw a move to a much more electronic-sounding approach with comparatively subdued vocals over synthesized sounds and beats.

== Discography ==
=== Albums ===
- 1992 – SuEcide Pt.1 & Pt.2
- 1994 – Limited Editions 1990–94 (Mille Plateaux / Geist Records UK)
- 1994 – Generation Star Wars (Mille Plateaux / Geist Records UK)
- 1995 – Low on Ice (Mille Plateaux Records)
- 1995 – Atari Teenage Riot – Delete Yourself (Digital Hardcore Rec. / Intercord)
- 1996 – Hypermodern Jazz 2000.5 (Mille Plateaux / Geist Records UK)
- 1996 – The Destroyer (Digital Hardcore Recordings)
- 1996 – Les Étoiles des Filles Mortes (Mille Plateaux / Geist Records UK)
- 1996 – Berlin Sky (Analogue Records USA)
- 1997 – Atari Teenage Riot – Burn Berlin Burn (Grand Royal USA / DHR)
- 1997 – Squeeze The Trigger (DHR UK)
- 1998 – Miss Black America (DHR UK)
- 1999 – Atari Teenage Riot – 60 Second Wipe Out (Elektra Records USA / DHR)
- 1999 – Nintendo Teenage Robots – We Punk Einheit (DHR Limited)
- 1999 – Alec Empire vs. Elvis Presley Bootleg (El Turco Loco)
- 2001 – Intelligence and Sacrifice (Beat Ink. Japan)
- 2002 – Intelligence and Sacrifice (Digital Hardcore Recordings / Zomba Records)
- 2002 – Redefine The Enemy (DVD)
- 2003 – Alec Empire & Merzbow live at CBGBs New York (Digital Hardcore Recordings)
- 2003 – The CD2 Sessions Live in London (Digital Hardcore Recordings)
- 2005 – Futurist (Digital Hardcore Recordings/Beat Ink Japan)
- 2006 – Atari Teenage Riot – Atari Teenage Riot (Digital Hardcore Recordings)
- 2007 – The Golden Foretaste of Heaven (Eat Your Heart Out Records/Beat Ink Japan)
- 2008 – The Golden Foretaste of Heaven (Eat Your Heart Out Records/Rough Trade)
- 2009 – Shivers (Eat Your Heart Out Records)
- 2011 – Mustard Pimp feat. Alec Empire – Catch Me (Dim Mak Records)
- 2011 – Atari Teenage Riot – Is This Hyperreal? (Digital Hardcore Recordings)

=== Remixes (selection) ===
- 1993 – Space Cube (Remix: Dschungelfieber) / Riot Beats
- 1994 – Air Liquide (Remix: Abuse Your Illusions Pt.1)
- 1996 – Nicolette (Remix: Beautiful Day) / Mercury Records / Talkin Loud Rec.
- 1996 – Stereo Total (Remix: Dactylo Rock)
- 1996 – Schorsch Kamerun (Remix: Die Menschen aus Kiel) / L'Âge d'or Records
- 1996 – Cibo Matto (Remix: Know Your Chicken) / Blanco Y Negro Records
- 1996 – Think About Mutation / Ooomph (Remix: Motor Razor)
- 1996 – Bindenmittel – (Remix: Unification) WEA Records
- 1997 – Nicolette (Remix: No Government) / Talkin Loud Records
- 1997 – Audio Active (Remix: My Way) / On U-Sound Records
- 1997 – Björk (Remix: Bachelorette) / One Little Indian Records
- 1997 – Björk (Remix: Joga) / Mother Records
- 1997 – Mad Capsule Markets (Remix: Crash Pow) / Viktor Entertainment Japan
- 1997 – Violent Onsen Geisha & DMBQ (Remix: Mood of Mods Generation) / ZK Records Japan
- 1997 – Einstürzende Neubauten (Remix: The Garden) / Mute Records
- 1997 – Schweisser (Remix: Friss Scheiße) / Intercord Tonträger GmbH
- 1997 – Bottom 12 – (Remix: Dance or be shot)
- 1997 – Buffalo Daughter (Remix: Dr Moog) / Grand Royal Records
- 1998 – Mark Stewart (Remix: Consumed) / Mute Records
- 1998 – Mogwai (Remix: Like Herod) / Eye Q Records UK, Jet Set Records
- 1998 – Thurston Moore (Remix: Root) / Lo Recordings
- 1998 – Shonen Knife – (Remix: Keep On Rockin) / MCA Victor Japan
- 1998 – Techno Animal vs. Reality (Remix: Atomic Buddha) / City Slang, Labels
- 1999 – Collision Course (El-P, Company Flow) (Remix: Trapped in 3D) / PIAS UK
- 1999 – Björk (Remix: Joga) / Columbia Records
- 2000 – Godzilla 2000 Soundtrack (Remix: March of Godzilla) / Nippon Columbia
- 2000 – Guitar Wolf – (Remix: Jet Virus) / KiOon Records Japan
- 2002 – Primal Scream (Remix: Miss Lucifer) / Columbia Records, Sony
- 2003 – Brainbombs (Remix: It's a Burning Hell) / Load Records USA
- 2003 – Chris Vrenna (Remix: Skool Daze) / Waxploitation Records USA
- 2004 – Rammstein (Remix: Amerika) / Universal Music
- 2004 – Panic DHH (Remix: Reach) / Gonzo Circus Records
- 2005 – Coil (band) (Remix: Tribute To Coil) / Fulldozer Records Russia
- 2005 – Rammstein (Remix: Mann Gegen Mann) / Universal Island Records
- 2006 – Most Precious Blood (Remix: Oxygen Dept) / Halo 8 Records USA
- 2007 – Emigrate (Remix: New York City) / Motor, Edel Records
- 2010 – IAMX (Remix: I Am Terrified) / Metropolis Records, 61Seconds
- 2012 – SALEM (Remix: Better Off Alone)
- 2021 – Eternal Struggle (Remix: Year of the Gun) / Demons Run Amok Entertainment

== Films / soundtracks / film music contribution and/or composition ==
- Spawn (USA, 1997)
- Orgazmo (USA, 1998)
- Modulations (USA, 1998)
- Hurricane Streets (USA, 1999)
- Buddyhead Presents: Punk Is Dead (USA, 2005)
- Threat (USA, 2000, Re-Release 2006)
- The Fast & The Furious: Tokyo Drift (USA, 2006)
- Monks: The Transatlantic Feedback (USA, Sp, D, 2006)
- Durch die Nacht mit … (Episode Arte TV, 2008)
- Atari Teenage Riot / Alec Empire: 16 Years of Video Material (DVD only, the United States, Japan, EU, 2008)
- 224466 (Japan, 2008, episode of 246)
- Slumber Party Slaughterhouse (USA, 2008)
- Chaostage (D, 2008)
- Godkiller (USA, 2010)
- Volt (Germany, 2018)
- Razzennest (Austria, 2022)
