= Autechre discography =

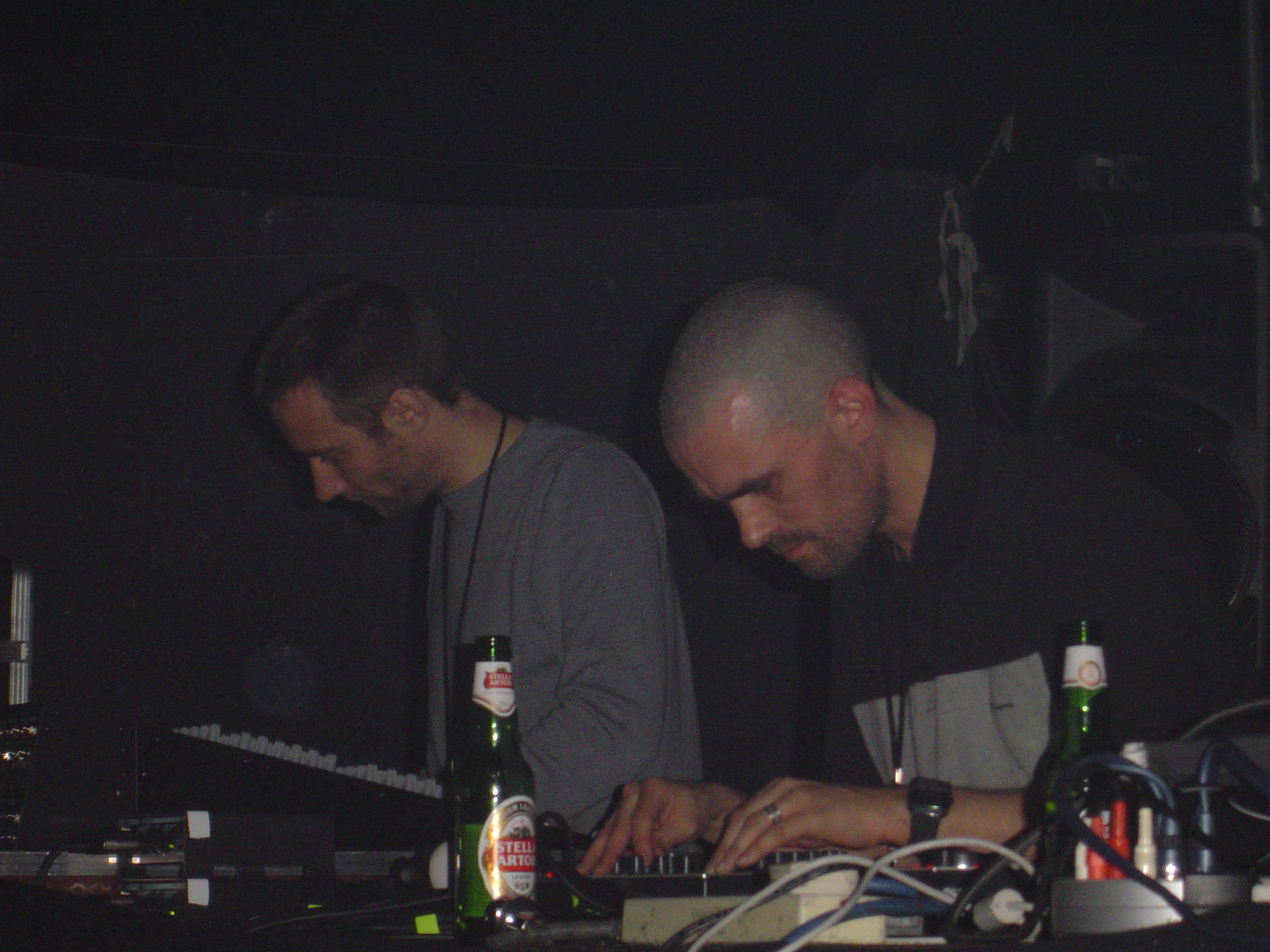
- Rob Brown and Sean Booth performing at the SeOne Club in London (2005)
- Studio albums: 15
- Extended plays: 17
- Live albums: 3
- Compilation albums: 3
- Singles: 5
- Music videos: 3

British electronic music duo Autechre have released fifteen studio albums, seventeen EPs, and five singles. They have also released three collections of live recordings as digital downloads through their online store.

== Albums ==
=== Studio albums ===
Title	Details	Peak chart positions			
Title	Details	UK	US Elec.	US Heat.	US Ind.
Lego Feet (as Lego Feet)	Released: 1 December 1991; Label: Skam; Formats: CD, LP, digital download	—	—	—	—
Incunabula	Released: 29 November 1993; Labels: Warp, Wax Trax! / TVT; Formats: CD, LP, cassette, digital download	—	—	—	—
Amber	Released: 7 November 1994; Labels: Warp, Wax Trax! / TVT; Formats: CD, LP, cassette, digital download	81	—	—	—
Tri Repetae	Released: 6 November 1995; Labels: Warp, Wax Trax! / TVT; Formats: CD, LP, cassette, digital download	86	—	—	—
Chiastic Slide	Released: 24 February 1997; Label: Warp; Formats: CD, LP, cassette, digital download	—	—	—	—
LP5	Released: 13 July 1998; Labels: Warp, Nothing; Formats: CD, LP, cassette, digital download	—	—	—	—
Confield	Released: 30 April 2001; Label: Warp; Formats: CD, LP, digital download	—	—	—	47
Draft 7.30	Released: 7 April 2003; Label: Warp; Formats: CD, LP, cassette, digital download	—	9	—	40
Untilted	Released: 18 April 2005; Label: Warp; Formats: CD, LP, digital download	—	17	—	—
Quaristice	Released: 29 January 2008; Label: Warp; Formats: CD, LP, digital download	—	13	50	—
Oversteps	Released: 23 March 2010; Label: Warp; Formats: CD, LP, digital download	—	15	46	—
Exai	Released: 5 March 2013; Label: Warp; Formats: CD, LP, digital download	88	21	33	—
elseq 1–5	Released: 19 May 2016; Label: Warp; Format: CD, digital download	87	—	—	—
NTS Sessions 1–4	Released: 26 April 2018; Labels: NTS, Warp; Formats: CD, LP, digital download	—	—	—	—
Sign	Released: 16 October 2020; Label: Warp; Formats: CD, LP, digital download	41	7	14	—
Plus	Released: 28 October 2020; Label: Warp; Formats: CD, LP, digital download	—	—	—	—
"—" denotes items which were not released in that country or failed to chart.

=== Live albums ===
Title	Details
AE_LIVE	Released: 29 October 2015; Label: Warp; Format: Digital download
AE LIVE 2016/2018	Released: 7 April 2020; Label: Warp; Format: Digital download
AE_2022–	Released: 10 August 2023; Label: Warp; Format: Digital download

=== Compilation albums ===
Title	Details
EPs 1991–2002	Released: 11 April 2011; Label: Warp; Formats: CD, digital download
Warp Tapes 89–93	Released: 24 June 2019; Label: Warp; Format: Digital download
^{3}oæh (with The Hafler Trio)	Released: April 2021; Label: Vinyl On Demand; Format: LP

== Extended plays ==
Title	Details	Peak chart positions			
Title	Details	UK	US Elec.	US Heat.	US Ind.
Basscadet	Released: 25 April 1994; Label: Warp, Wax Trax! / TVT; Formats: CD, LP, digital download	—	—	—	—
Anti	Released: 3 September 1994; Label: Warp; Formats: CD, LP, digital download	—	—	—	—
Garbage	Released: 27 February 1995; Label: Warp; Formats: CD, LP, digital download	—	—	—	—
Anvil Vapre	Released: 2 October 1995; Label: Warp; Formats: CD, LP, digital download	—	—	—	—
Envane	Released: 27 January 1997; Label: Warp; Formats: CD, LP, digital download	94	—	—	—
Cichlisuite	Released: 26 August 1997; Label: Warp; Formats: CD, LP, digital download	—	—	—	—
EP7	Released: 7 June 1999; Label: Warp, Nothing; Formats: CD, LP, digital download	—	—	—	—
Gantz Graf	Released: 5 August 2002; Label: Warp; Format: CD, LP, digital download	—	—	—	—
Digital Exclusive EP	Released: 23 April 2008; Label: Warp; Format: Digital download	—	—	—	—
Quaristice.Quadrange.ep.ae	Released: 19 May 2008; Label: Warp; Format: Digital download	—	—	—	—
Move of Ten	Released: 14 June 2010; Label: Warp; Formats: CD, LP, digital download	—	—	—	—
L-Event	Released: 11 October 2013; Label: Warp; Formats: CD, LP, digital download	—	—	—	—
"—" denotes items which were not released in that country or failed to chart.

=== Peel Sessions ===
Title	Details	Peak chart positions			
Title	Details	UK	US Elec.	US Heat.	US Ind.
Peel Session	Released: 11 January 1999; Label: Warp; Formats: CD, LP, digital download	—	—	—	—
Peel Session 2	Released: 11 December 2000; Label: Warp; Formats: CD, LP, digital download	—	—	—	—
"—" denotes items which were not released in that country or failed to chart.

=== With The Hafler Trio ===
Title	Details	Peak chart positions			
Title	Details	UK	US Elec.	US Heat.	US Ind.
æ^{3}o & h^{3}æ	Released: 4 December 2003; Label: Phonometrography; Format: CD	—	—	—	—
æo^{3} & ^{3}hæ	Released: 21 July 2005; Label: Die Stadt; Format: CD	—	—	—	—
ah^{3}eo & ha^{3}oe (ae3o3)	Released: 29 August 2011; Labels: Die Stadt, Simply Superior; Format: DVD	—	—	—	—
"—" denotes items which were not released in that country or failed to chart.

== Singles ==
Title	Year	Label
"Autechre" (Note: "Autechre" and its B-side "Saw You" were released on cassette in limited quantity. It is the earliest Autechre release recorded and was issued as the duo's demo tape, earning them their spot on Warp's artist roster.)	1990	—N/a
"Cavity Job"	1991	Hardcore
"We R Are Why"	1996	Warp
"Splitrmx12"	1999	Warp
"JNSN CODE GL16 / spl47"	2017	Touched

== Other appearances ==
Title	Album	Year	Label
"Crystel"	Artificial Intelligence	1992	Warp
"The Egg"	Artificial Intelligence	1992	Warp
"Lanx 3"	Volume Eight	1993	Volume
"Chatter"	Artificial Intelligence II	1994	Warp
"Silversub"	FMCD January 1995	1995	Future Music Magazine
"Nonima"	Mind The Gap Volume 5	1995	Gonzo Circus
"P·I·O·B" (Mix Two)	Untitled	1996	What's That Noise
"Carni"	Eurowarp	1996	Warp
"アイレ可愛や" (with Mari Hamada)	編む女	1997	Polystar
"Inhake 3"	22 Class A Tracks	1997	Release
"Puch"	Elements	1997	MDS
"Stop Look Listen"	We Are Reasonable People	1998	Warp
"Adverse Camber" (with Tortoise)	Adverse Camber / To Day Retreival [sic]	1998	Thrill Jockey
"To Day Retreival [sic]" (with Tortoise)	Adverse Camber / To Day Retreival [sic]	1998	Thrill Jockey
"Konlied Mx"	Routine	2001	Warp
"All Tomorrow's Linoleum"	All Tomorrow's Parties 1.0	2001	ATP
"Naftwa4"	WIFOF2003 Mix	2003	Warp
"/]{- /](∣∣) Excerpt"	All Tomorrow's Parties 3.0	2003	ATP
"Bronchus One.1"	An Anthology Of Noise & Electronic Music #2	2003	Sub Rosa
"Coenc3"	45: A Tribute To Daniel Hansson	2008	Red Handed
"Elephant Gear" (with Venetian Snares as AEVSVS)	45: A Tribute To Daniel Hansson	2008	Red Handed
"Oval Moon (IBC Mx)"	Warp20 (Unheard)	2009	Warp
"6852"	6852	2011	ATP
"Ts1a"	Benefit Compilation For Japan	2011	Icasea
"SYptixed"	Bleep:10	2014	Bleep

=== Autechre remixes of other artists ===
Artist	Track	Year	Appears on
Buck-Tick	Iconoclasm (Don't X-ray da DAT mix)	1994	シェイプレス
The Higher Intelligence Agency	Speech3 (Conoid Tone Reformed by Autechre)	1994	Reform
Palmskin Productions	Evolution of the Beast (Autechre mix)	1994	The Beast
Saint Etienne	Like a Motorway (Skin Up, You're Already Dead)	1994	Like a Motorway
Schaft	SKF10047 (mixed by Autechre)	1994	Switchblade
Beaumont Hannant	Psi-Onyx (Psix Million Dollar Myx Oscar Goldman's Bonus)	1995	Psi-Onyx
Scorn	Falling (Autechre - "FR 13" mix)	1995	Ellipsis
Slowly	On the Loose (For Internal Use Only)	1995	Ming
Softballetforms	Jail of Freedom (Jailtilsli)	1995	Remix for Ordinary People
V	Vliezwei (Vliegenbos Morning Reproduced by Autechre)	1995	Sub-Machine/The Unheard/Vliezwei
DJ Food	Sexy Bits (ae9v mix)	1996	Refried Food
Dominique Dalcan	Aveugle & Sourd (Autechre mix)	1996	Aveugle & Sourd Remixes
Edge of Motion	Earth Ball (Autechre Rmx)	1996	Ad Hoc
Gescom	Keynell (1)	1996	Keynell Remixes
Gescom	Keynell (2)	1996	Keynell Remixes
Impulse	One-Six-Four-Seven (Numbers Rammed Down My Ear mix by Ae)	1996	One-Six-Four-One-Seven EP; Wall of Pressure
Kinesthesia (Cylob)	Sanq (Autechre mix)	1996	Empathy Box Remixes; Previously Unavailable on Compact Disc
Lamb	Gold (Autechre mix)	1996	Gold
Mike Ink	Paroles (Autechre Repoles)	1996	Polka Trax
Nav Katze	Happy? (Qunk mix by Autechre)	1996	Gentle and Elegance
Silvania	1belm : autechre mx	1996	Delay Tambor
Spacetime Continuum	String of Pearls (Autechre mix)	1996	Remit Recaps
Gescom	Mag 3.1426 (rmxd by Ae)	1997	Skampler; This
Gescom	Keynell (remix)	1997	Radio Mix
Jimi Tenor	Take Me Baby (remix)	1997	Radio Mix
Lexis	Hypnotise (Autechre Slow remix)	1997	Criminal Elements/Hypnotise
Mark Broom	Any No. Between 1 & 17 (Autechre remix)	1997	Angie Is a Shoplifter (EP)
Medium	Celsius (Rebuilt by Autechre)	1997	7 Hills Clash
Merzbow	Ecobondage (Ending) Ae remix	1997	Scumtron
Nav Katze	Happy? (Qunk mix dub)	1997	Never Mind the Distortion
Autechre/Tortoise	Adverse Camber	1998	Adverse Camber/To Day Retreival [sic]
Autechre/Tortoise	To Day Retreival [sic]	1998	Adverse Camber/To Day Retreival [sic]
East Flatbush Project	Tried by 12 (Autechre Mx)	1998	Tried by 12
Gescom	Keynell (rmxd by Ae)	1998	This
Gescom	Viral Rival (rmxd by Ae)	1998	This
Skinny Puppy	Killing Game (Bent mix)	1998	Remix Dystemper
Stereolab	Refractions in the Plastic Pulse (Feebate mix)	1998	Miss Modular; Refractions in the Plastic Pulse
Various Artists	8 (Ae mix)	1998	Remixes; Across Uneven Terrain
D-Breeze	Crazy for Love (remix)	1999	Mask 500
Jürgen Paape	Autechre (TR7AEremix) vs. Jürgen Paape	1999	Sub Rosa vs. Kompakt
Nightmares on Wax	Sal Batardes (Purple mix)	1999	Warp 10+3 Remixes
Phoenecia	Odd Job (Systems Mono version)	1999	Odd Job(s)
Squarepusher	Two Bass Hit (ae mix)	1999	Maximum Priest E.P.
Various Artists	No. 8 (æ2 mix by Autechre)	1999	8, 8.5, 9 · Remixes
Kruton	Smallfish Pa.Track2 (Autechre remix)	2001	Granular Plateaux
Freeform	A.T (Autechre)	2002	Audiotourism Reinterpretations: Vietnam and China
Jello	Neph (Autechre Ultramatique 6 mix)	2003	Lungbone EP
Seefeel	Autechre Remix of Spangle by Seefeel	2003	Autechre Remix of Spangle by Seefeel
Team Doyobi	Push Chairs for Grown Ups (Autechre remix)	2003	Push Chairs for Grown Ups (Remixes)
Earth	Coda Maestosa in F(flat) Minor	2005	Legacy of Dissolution
Mark Broom	Any Number Between 1 & 17 (Autechre alt mix)	2005	Angie Revisited
Sensational meets Kouhei	Sensachre 10 Mix (Autechre remix)	2006	Sensational meets Kouhei
Surgeon	Bad Hands Part II (Autechre remix)	2007	Whose Bad Hands Are These? (Part I)
Unique 3	The Theme (Autechre remix)	2007	The Theme
LFO	What Is House? (LFO remix) (Autechre remix)	2009	Warp20 (Recreated)
The Black Dog	Tunnels Ov Set (Autechre remix)	2009	We Are Sheffield
Anodyne	Close Your Eyes (Corporation Street remix by Autechre)	2010	The Remixes EP
Deneir	The Winding Ladder (Autechre remix)	2010	Nowhen EP
The Bug feat. Killa P & Flowdan	Skeng (Autechre remix)	2010	Infected; Ninja Tune XX: 20 Years of Beats & Pieces
The Bug feat. Killa P & Flowdan	Skeng (Autechre dub)	2010	FACT Magazine Download
Oberman Knocks	Dilankex (Autechre remix)	2014	Dilankex
Russell Haswell	Heavy Handed Sunset (Autechre Conformity version)	2015	As Sure as Night Follows Day (Remixes)
Giorgio Moroder & Raney Shockne	611 Time Out (Autechre remix)	2016	Tron RUN/r (Original Soundtrack)
Anodyne	We Are All We Have (Autechre Remix)	2021	Decayed
Sophie	Bipp (Autechre Mx)	2021	Bipp (Autechre Mx) / Unisil
Humanoid	sT8818r (A664 Mix by Autechre)	2021	sT8818r Humanoid

== Music videos ==
- 1993: "Basscadet (Bcdtmx)" (from "Basscadet" single)
- 1995: "Second Bad Vilbel" (from the Anvil Vapre EP)
- 2002: "Gantz Graf" (from the Gantz Graf EP)
