= Quaristice =

Studio album by Autechre
- Released: 29 January 2008
- Genres: Electronic; experimental; IDM; ambient
- Length: 73:15
- Label: Warp
- Producers: Rob Brown; Sean Booth

Autechre chronology
Untilted (2005)	Quaristice (2008)	Oversteps (2010)

Quaristice is the ninth studio album by the British electronic music duo Autechre. Released through Warp Records, digital editions were initially released on 29 January 2008 while physical editions were made available on 3 March.

An experimental electronic album, Quaristice is made up of shorter three to four minute tracks and focuses more on melody than the duo's previous albums. It was mostly created from extended jam sessions before being cut down and further edited. Equipment used for Autechre's live sets as well as laptops were utilised heavily throughout the album's production.

The album's artwork was created by The Designers Republic, ten years after their last collaboration with Autechre. A limited deluxe CD edition of the album with a steel cover was released, containing a second disc with a variety of alternate versions of tracks, titled Quaristice (Versions). Later, thirteen digital-only extended mixes of songs from Quaristice were made available as Quaristice.Quadrange.ep.ae.

Generally, Quaristice received positive reviews from critics. Many noted its more accessible nature and replayability, and appreciated the variety of ideas presented throughout the album. Some felt more negatively towards the album, noting that it lacked structure and progression.

== Background ==
Autechre are a British electronic music duo consisting of members Rob Brown and Sean Booth. The duo's debut album, Incunabula, released in 1993 through Warp and saw positive reviews from critics. In later albums such as Confield and Draft 7.30, the duo's music became more experimental, utilising software such as Max to produce generative music. Booth and Brown moved back to more traditional melodies and beats for their 2005 album Untilted.

After the conclusion of the Untilted tour, Booth moved from Suffolk to Manchester. This saw him and Brown working more portably, making significant use of laptops and gear used during their live performances. Gradually, the two moved into creating music during longer studio jam sessions, which led to the production of tracks that would make up Quaristice.

== Production ==
The tracks that make up Quaristice were constructed from extended jam sessions. Brown and Booth created two hour-long jam sessions each day. It took the duo six months to edit these sessions down into six or eight minute tracks, before further reducing them. This led to the creation of multiple alternate versions of tracks from which they could select for the album. Compared to their previous album Untilted, Booth and Brown focused more on hardware rather than software.

The majority of the album was recorded on their live setup at the time, which included the Mac G4, Elektron Machinedrum and Monomachine, Clavia Nord Modular G2 and Nord Rack, Yamaha FS1R, Akai MPC1000, Alesis QuadraVerb, and Lexicon PCM 80 and 90. Booth and Brown also utilised Digital Performer for editing tracks, allowing them to move around audio and switch between takes. The track "Tankakern" makes use of a Roland TR-606 Drumatix. The track "fol3" consists of audio recorded on a AKG 1000 microphone, which was processed with a custom patch before being cut up. "Steels" was created using the MPC1000 and "some secret techniques".

== Music ==
Quaristice has been described as electronic, experimental, IDM and ambient. In contrast to the duo's previous albums, each track on Quaristice has a shorter runtime, each roughly around three to four minutes in length. Andy Kellman of AllMusic compared the album to a series of fully formed vignettes. The album also places greater emphasis on melody, which Colin Buttimer of BBC Music said the duo had "foresworn for some time" on earlier releases.

"chenc9"
"chenc9" is the eighteenth track of Quaristice. It was described as a techno track with hip-hop influences and click beats. One critic noted it was reminiscent of Aphex Twin.

Opening track "Altibzz" was described as a beatless ambient piece made up of "pretty analog synthesizer washes". "The Plc" is composed of a repetitive beat made up of a "stiff and mannered snare drum". "IO" contains "distorted voice transmissions" and "obtuse", "chunky" beats. "plyPhon" has "stuttering kick drums" and focuses on both ambience and rhythm. "Perlence" is made up of "scattershot dub-techno" and a "sinister bass line". "SonDEremawe" contains "nervous ghost-in-the-machine drone". "Simmm" contains "metal insect clatter" and "deadened chiming and clanging" before "entering an impressive stretch of dramatic minimalism". "paralel Suns" [sic] features slow, immersive drones and expansive digital textures. Paul Lloyd of Igloo Magazine called it "a gentle interlude at the mid-point of the album". "Steels" contains "flanging scrapes and space-age twangs". "Tankakern" is made up of a "dizzying industrial throb" with "heavy-breathing percussion" and "keyboard squiggles".

"rale" was described as a "Drexciya-worthy pitch-black neo-electro" track with a "towering beat" and "acid riff". "Fol3" was described as a "complex arrangement of textures" and consists of an "overwhelming assault of white noise bursts" "fwzE" was described as a "taut [piece] of robotic clanker-funk" in a piece for The Quietus. One critic described "90101-5l-l" as "future electro-shock". "bnc Castl" is made up of hi-hats and snares that are "tucked deeply into the mix". "Theswere" contains radio buzz, a simple melody and "plaintive pastoral drones". "WNSN" contains groaning tonal clusters that are "overwhelmed by their own strength". "chenc9" is a "hyper techno" track with hip-hop influences and "tense click beats". Peter Chambers of Resident Advisor said that the track was reminiscent to that of Aphex Twin. "Notwo" is a "moody" track composed of "looping distorted key drones". Closing track "Outh9X" is a lengthier track with a "steady electronic pulse" and an "extended ambient coda".

== Artwork ==
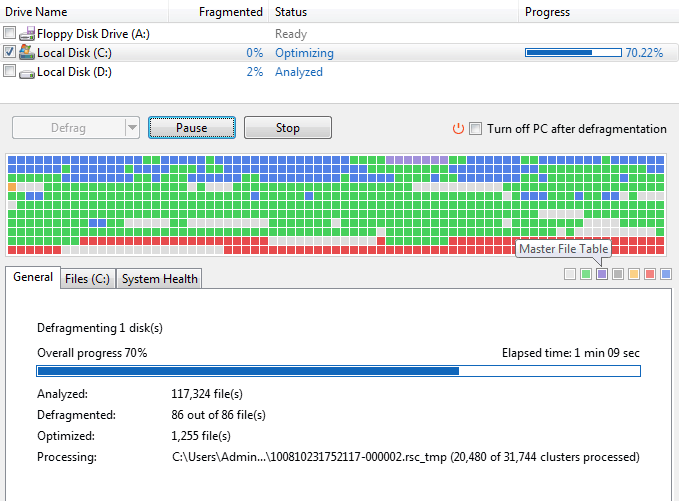
A disk defragmentation tool that visualises data as squares, which inspired the design behind Quaristice.

The artwork for Quaristice was created by The Designers Republic (tDR). After the release of Chiastic Slide, Autechre and tDR took a break from working together for ten years, with tDR not working on the artwork for the duo's next four albums. They worked together again in 2008 for Quaristice, with tDR noting Autechre's music became "harder, more abrasive, less human than before".

The majority of the artwork and packaging for the album is made up of squares and "minute and precisely laid out Akzidenz-Grotesk type". Booth stated "the idea was to be type based, neat and producty" and that their brief was "really, really specific". The design was originally inspired by disk defragmentation graphics, specifically from Norton's Disk Tools. tDR stated the squares lack any meaning, other than "to suggest no meaning at all". The colours used for Quaristice reference old consumer technology user guides. James Burton, who handled production at Warp, found a manufacturer that was able to laser-cut into steel, so tDR "re-imagined the physicality of the design as a "techno" metal box" for the deluxe 2xCD edition.

== Release ==
Quaristice was originally scheduled for release on 3 March 2008; however, it was made available for download on 29 January. CD and double vinyl versions were released on the album's original release date through Warp Records. In reference to releasing physical versions of the album, Booth said "the actual product is the FLAC file – but I don't object to those who want to own something that they can hold." The album entered the UK Dance Album Chart at No. 6 for two weeks, the UK Independent Albums Chart at No. 15 for two weeks and the US Top Dance Albums chart at No. 13 for three weeks.

A deluxe double CD version of the album was released with a steel cover. Included was a second CD of alternate versions of eleven tracks from the original Quaristice titled Quaristice (Versions). Paul Lloyd of Igloo Magazine said that Versions "covers everything from dark ambience to old school techno and industrial through to cinematic atmospherics and beyond".

Over the course of two weeks, a set of thirteen extended mixes of tracks from Quaristice were released. Eventually, these tracks were combined and released as Quaristice.Quadrange.ep.ae. The collection is 150 minutes long, with the tracks being exclusively released as digital files. The decision to release Quadrange digitally came after Booth and Brown produced "Perlence subrange 6-36", an hour-long track that would have filled an entire CD, feeling it would be unfair to charge listeners for a single track of that length. David Abravanel of PopMatters called Quadrange "a simmering exploration of Autechre at their most spacious, and further demonstration of the diversity and profundity of their sound".

On 5 September 2025, both Quaristice and Untilted were re-issued on vinyl as part of an effort to re-issue Autechre's back catalogue.

== Critical reception ==
Professional ratings
Aggregate scores
Source	Rating
Metacritic	71/100
Review scores
Source	Rating
AllMusic	4/5 stars
Drowned in Sound	8/10
The Guardian	3/5 stars
The Independent	2/5 stars
Mojo	4/5 stars
MusicOMH	4/5 stars
NME	3/5 stars
Pitchfork	7.5/10
Tiny Mix Tapes	4.5/5 stars
Uncut	4/5 stars

Quaristice received generally positive reviews. At Metacritic, which aggregates scores from mainstream critics, Quaristice has an average score of 71 based on 22 reviews, indicating generally favourable reviews.

Andy Kellman of AllMusic said that despite the large amount and short running time of the tracks, that "the ideas arrive fully formed, never appearing to be dashed off or loosely sketched," and that "not since LP5 has being impressed been so obviously secondary to enjoyment." Writing for BBC Music, Colin Buttimer called Quaristice a "fecund joy that deserves your attention". In a review for The Guardian, Pascal Wyse said that while Quaristice had "plenty of ingenuity and microscopic beauty across its 20 tracks", it was limited by "its own twitchy algorithms". Writing for Pitchfork, Mark Richardson said that while the album was "in some ways the most listenable album [they'd] created in a decade," he warned that it was "ultimately no easier to parse, and can be very rough going indeed if you're not in the mood for their peculiar world." Ben Hogwood of MusicOMH said that the album was an "easier way in" to Autechre's discography compared to their previous albums and that it impressed with its structure, textures and sounds.

Writing for NME, Tony Naylor said the album had ideas that could have been produced as a "stunning 10-track album" and called its songs "elusively experimental ear-tormenters". In a review for Spin, Shannon Zimmerman called Quaristice "simultaneously melancholy and lascivious" and "pure aural pleasure". Erik Gundel of PopMatters said it would take time for listeners to understand the album and that it "demonstrates Autechre's ability to pop in every few years with a firm grasp on the present state of electronic music and a strong sense of the compositional". Writing for The New York Times, Nate Chinen noted how "each track heeds a particular design" and that most tracks consisted of "variable synthetic twitchiness". Charles Ubaghs of Drowned in Sound said that although the album seemed like a "collection of sketches than complete works" at face value, continued listening showed a "welcome abundance of ideas being explored and experimented with over and over again".

Some critics were more negative towards the album. Andy Gill of The Independent gave a negative review, saying that the album found the duo "still searching vainly for structure and meaning among a largely impenetrable undergrowth of synthesized ticks and tones." Writing for Resident Advisor, Peter Chambers called the album a "deliberately average and dull piece of work" and a "creative failure" due to its cover artwork and its "'one idea' sketches with very little progression". In a piece for DIY, Richard Bendall-Jones criticised the lack of continuation throughout Quaristice and called its "stop-start" approach "irritating and elusive".

== Track listing ==
All tracks are written by Sean Booth and Rob Brown.

Quaristice track listing
No.	Title	Length
1.	"Altibzz"	2:52
2.	"The Plc"	4:16
3.	"IO"	3:08
4.	"plyPhon"	2:33
5.	"Perlence"	3:25
6.	"SonDEremawe"	1:21
7.	"Simmm"	5:00
8.	"paralel Suns"	3:03
9.	"Steels"	2:56
10.	"Tankakern"	3:39
11.	"rale"	3:42
12.	"Fol3"	3:47
13.	"fwzE"	2:38
14.	"90101-5l-l"	3:11
15.	"bnc Castl"	2:52
16.	"Theswere"	2:12
17.	"WNSN"	4:56
18.	"chenc9"	4:57
19.	"Notwo"	5:34
20.	"Outh9X"	7:14
21.	"nu-Nr6d" (Japanese bonus track)	3:51
Total length:		77:06

Quaristice (Versions) track listing
No.	Title	Length
1.	"Altichyre"	1:43
2.	"The Plc lCp C"	9:18
3.	"IO (mons)"	7:52
4.	"Phylopn"	2:40
5.	"Perlence range 3"	7:37
6.	"SonDEre-ix"	3:27
7.	"Tankraken"	5:28
8.	"fol4"	11:41
9.	"90101-61-01"	5:10
10.	"chenc9-x"	8:28
11.	"nofour"	4:24
Total length:		67:48

Quaristice.Quadrange.ep.ae track listing
No.	Title	Length
1.	"The Plc ccc"	10:05
2.	"Perlence range 7"	10:14
3.	"Perlence Suns"	4:07
4.	"90101-51-6"	8:46
5.	"9013-2"	2:04
6.	"Tkakanren"	10:25
7.	"90101-51-19"	12:48
8.	"Perlence subrange 3"	7:08
9.	"chenc9-1dub"	3:52
10.	"9010171-121"	4:33
11.	"Perlence losid 2"	7:36
12.	"notwotwo"	9:37
13.	"Perlence subrange 6-36"	58:37
Total length:		149:29

== Personnel ==
Credits adapted from the liner notes.

- Rob Brown – production
- Sean Booth – production
- Noel Summerville – mastering
- The Designers Republic – design

== Charts ==
Chart performance for Quaristice
Chart (2008)	Peak position
Belgian Albums (Ultratop Flanders)	71
UK Dance Albums (Official Charts)	6
UK Independent Albums (Official Charts)	15
US Top Dance Albums (Billboard)	13

== Release history ==
Country/Region	Date	Label	Format	Catalogue number
Worldwide (from Bleep)	29 January 2008	Warp Records	MP3	WARPCDD333
Worldwide (from Bleep)	29 January 2008	Warp Records	FLAC	WARPCDD333F
Japan	27 February 2008	Beat Records	CD	BRC-333
Europe	3 March 2008	Warp Records	CD	WARPCD333
Europe	3 March 2008	Warp Records	2×LP	WARPLP333
Worldwide (from Warpmart)	3 March 2008	Warp Records	2×CD	WARPCD333X
North America	4 March 2008	Warp Records	CD	WARPCD333
North America	4 March 2008	Warp Records	2×LP	WARPLP333
