= Autechre Guitar =

2026 covers album

Studio album by Shane Parish
- Released: February 27, 2026
- Recorded: October 2025
- Genres: Acoustic; avant-garde
- Length: 51:43
- Label: Palilalia Records
- Producer: Shane Parish

Shane Parish chronology
Solo at Cafe OTO (2025)	Autechre Guitar (2026)

Singles from Autechre Guitar
- 1. "Maetl" Released: December 5, 2025; 2. "Eggshell" Released: December 5, 2025; 3. "Corc" Released: January 6, 2026

Autechre Guitar is a covers album by American guitarist and composer Shane Parish. The album was released on February 27, 2026 through Palilalia Records. An acoustic avant-garde album, it consists of Autechre songs performed solo, on acoustic guitar, with no additional effects or overdubbing. The collection of tracks are derived from Incunabula (1993), Amber (1994), Tri Repetae (1995) and LP5 (1998). The album was received positively by critics.

== Background ==
Shane Parish is an American guitarist from Athens, Georgia. Parish leads the avant-rock band Ahleuchatistas and is part of the Bill Orcutt Guitar Quartet. Parish was introduced to Autechre, a British experimental electronic duo, by his wife Courtney in the early 2000s. In the 2020s, starting with a cover of "Slip" from Amber, Parish would gradually work through the duo's discography, notating a variety of tracks. "Slip" was followed by "Bike" from Incunabula and "Eutow" from Tri Repetae.

== Music ==
Autechre Guitar has been described as both acoustic and avant-garde. Its tracklist consists of cover versions taken from Autechre's first four studio albums, re-arranged and performed by Parish solely on acoustic guitar. While the original versions of the tracks consist of a variety of layered melodies, tracks on Autechre Guitar often opt to focus on primary melodies heard within the originals. Parish often made sacrifices in his arrangements, such as percussive elements of the originals being replaced with long, sustained notes. The album also lacks additional overdubbing or effects added to Parish's performances.

"Maetl", a heavily percussive track originating from Incunabula, lacks all percussion in Parish's rendition. The track is "whittled down to its minor-key figure" and becomes minimalist and sparse. The cover also lacks half of the length of the original, which one critic regarded as the track turning into a "introspective study" rather than a "percussive, dizzy sizzler". "Eutow" was regarded as one of the most impressive covers from the album due to the original’s overabundance of percussion. Parish's cover also extends the track's runtime, with Timothy Monger of AllMusic noting the track felt natural being played acoustically. "Slip" was also noted as an impressive cover, due to the original's "unpredictable" timing. Parish opted to slow the track's tempo, making the track calmer and turning it into a "gentle folk gait". Closing track "Clipper" turns the original into a minimal ambient piece, foregoing its "moody breakbeats" and becoming a "brooding blues" track.

== Release ==
Prior to the album's release, Parish's covers of "Maetl", "Eggshell" and "Corc" were released as singles. Autechre Guitar was released on February 27, 2026 through Palilalia Records on 2xLP, CD and through digital platforms.

== Reception ==
Professional ratings
Aggregate scores
Source	Rating
Metacritic	83/100
Review scores
Source	Rating
AllMusic	4/5 stars
Pitchfork	7.6/10
PopMatters	8/10

Autechre Guitar was received positively by critics upon release. At Metacritic, which aggregates scores from mainstream critics, Autechre Guitar received a rating of 83 out of 100 based on six critic reviews, indicating "universal acclaim".

In a review for AllMusic, Timothy Monger said that Parish cast Autechre's songs in a new light, and called it a "unique and unexpected collaboration". KLOF Magazine writer Glenn Kimpton called the album "super clean, incredibly precise and simply a pleasure to listen to". Writing for Pitchfork, Sam Sodomsky described the album as a "fascinating endeavor" and called the tracks "graceful new forms" of their originals. Chris Ingalls of PopMatters said the album was a "rewarding listen" as "Parish has discovered aspects of the original songs that may have been unnoticed". Spin writer Reed Jackson wrote that Parish's acoustic versions of Autechre's songs had "given their music even more power".

== Track listing ==
All tracks written by Rob Brown and Sean Booth, though arranged and performed by Shane Parish.

Autechre Guitar track listing
No.	Title	Album	Length
1.	"Maetl"	Incunabula	2:11
2.	"Eggshell"	Incunabula	5:15
3.	"Eutow"	Tri Repetae	5:12
4.	"Slip"	Amber	4:52
5.	"Bike"	Incunabula	6:27
6.	"Nine"	Amber	4:43
7.	"Yulquen"	Amber	6:16
8.	"Lowride"	Incunabula	6:05
9.	"Corc"	LP5	6:34
10.	"Clipper"	Tri Repetae	4:08
Total length:			51:43

== Personnel ==
Credits adapted from the album's liner notes.

- Autechre – music
- Bill Orcutt – artwork, design
- Shane Parish – guitar, recording, arrangement
- Danny Piechocki – photography
- James Plotkin – mastering
