= Untilted =

2005 studio album by Autechre

Studio album by Autechre
- Released: 18 April 2005
- Genres: Abstract; electronic; IDM; experimental
- Length: 69:50; 71:52 (Japanese)
- Label: Warp
- Producers: Rob Brown; Sean Booth

Autechre chronology
Draft 7.30 (2003)	Untilted (2005)	Quaristice (2008)

Untilted is the eighth studio album by the British electronic music duo Autechre. It was released on 18 April 2005 through Warp Records and on 9 April by Beat Records in Japan.

The album saw Autechre members Sean Booth and Rob Brown continue to move back to traditional rhythms and consistent beats, no longer feeling limited by set rhythms. Compared to their previous albums, no generative music was used in its production. Before its release, a fake version of the album was distributed.

Untilted received mixed reviews from critics. While many reviewers enjoyed the general sound of the album and the ideas presented, others were more critical and thought of the music as unenjoyable and boring. The duo toured in support of the album.

== Background and recording ==
In Draft 7.30, Autechre's previous album, the duo began to move back to more traditional rhythms for their music rather than experimental ones. In an interview, Booth noted how they were "getting more acquainted with rhythm" and how rhythm no longer limited them like it did before. The duo used a variety of different sequences all running at the same time during the creation of Untilted. They used different mixes of drum machines, old MIDI and analogue sequencers, as well as MPCs. The album was recorded over a period of nine months.

Contrastingly, no generative music was used during the production of the album like on Confield. A variety of samples were used throughout the album. Booth described how analogue technology lacked visual interfaces, which helped him compose music. It allowed the duo to "drift into another world" and "just get on with doing the tune". In response to a fan asking why they returned to "repetitive rhythmic structures" for Untilted, Brown responded that it was "hard to know when someone calls your stuff repetitive, because you know that it's not".

== Music ==
Untilted has been described as abstract, electronic, IDM and experimental. Repetition was noted by critics as a large focus point of the album. In comparison to the duo's other works, such as Draft 7.30 and Gantz Graf, Untilted has a greater focus on rhythm and consistent beats. Collin Buttimer of BBC Music described the album as being "very much fascinated with rhythm and metamorphosis". Tracks throughout the album often evolve into something different from how they opened. Scott McKeating of Stylus noted how the album takes a more "engaging turn" as it progresses.

"Ipacial Section"
"Ipacial Section" is the second track of Untilted; it establishes a "frantic" rhythm before morphing and changing throughout its runtime.

Opening track "LCC" begins with a fast tempo and a forward-driving structure, before the tempo later slows down with the focus shifting to the melodics of the track. "Ipacial Section" establishes a "frantic" rhythm, with different elements being introduced over time, until the track "[sounds] much different than it did to begin with". "Pro Radii" begins with industrial sounds, which a Pitchfork review compared to "stomping through a foggy alley using meter-thick blocks of iron as shoe souls [sic]". The track also features contrasting "booming bass tones" and "smaller, staccato click-beats".

"Augmatic Disport" uses "jittery drum'n'bass stutters" to create an effect that is "simultaneously nightmarish and exhilarating". The track sees "rhythmic particles attempting to bounce free from the lengthy structures", becoming more melodic as the track progresses. "Iera" makes use of ambient electronics, which are "tinged with a schizophrenic twist". Autechre stated the track was "purely programmed, grid-programmed, all onscreen, just nudging MIDI events around". "Fermium" progresses from fast-paced and energetic sections to slower, more subdued passages with synthesised sounds.

"The Trees" borrows elements from rave music, and begins with frantic percussion, eventually evolving to "dizzyingly complex heights" before "dissolving into static". McKeating said the track "sounds more blood than oil" because of its "pitchshifted electro making a lengthy riff that drives the tune along". Closer "Sublimit" was originally one of Autechre's longest songs. It contains "beats wrapping furious trails around each other faster than the mind could follow". The track was composed through "a drum machine up and running, 16-grid style, no swing or anything, everything just completely straight".

== Release ==
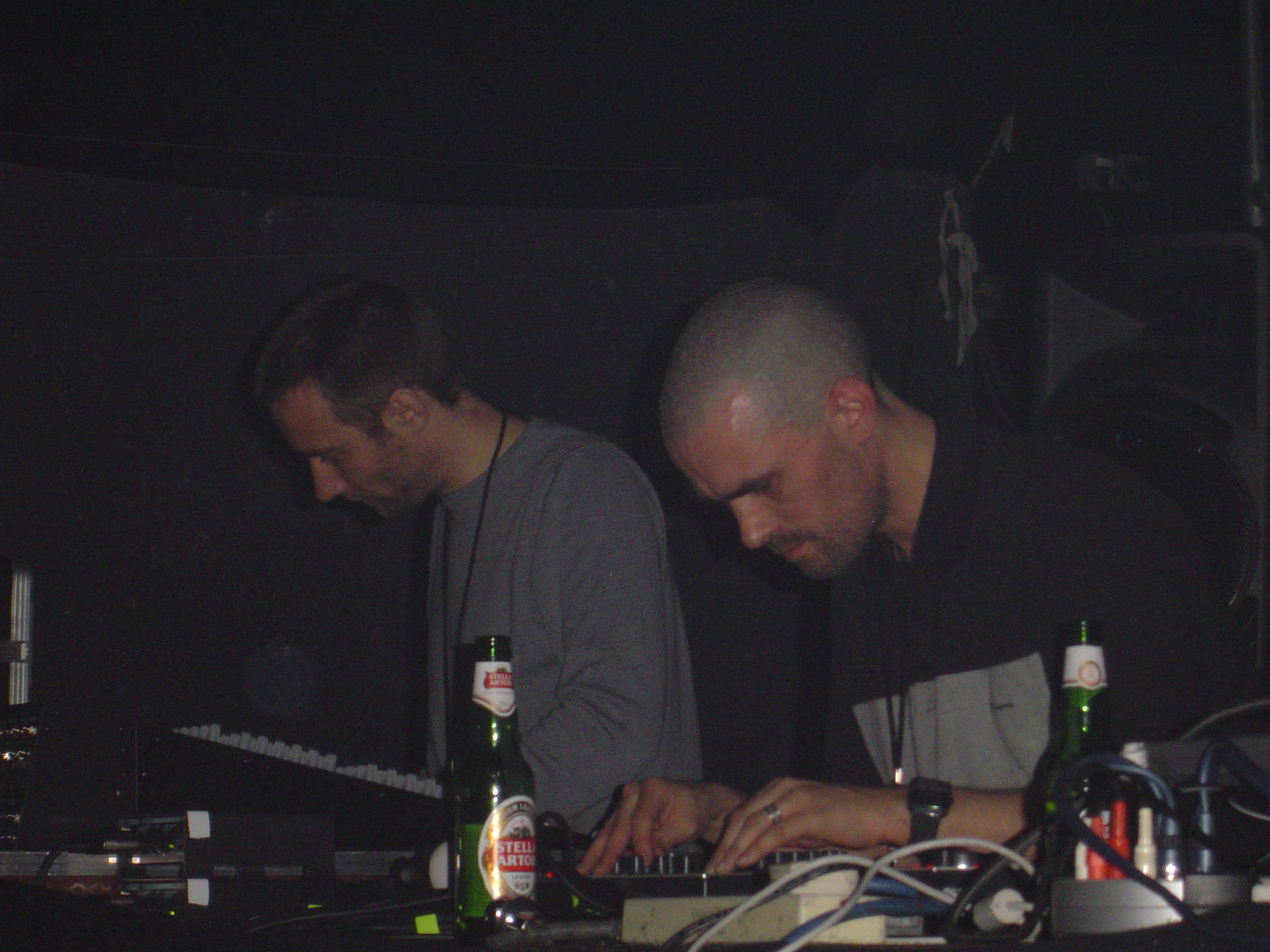
Autechre, 2005, playing live at the seOne nightclub.

A fake version of the album was distributed throughout the internet before its official release. When asked about the fake, Booth said "the more fakes the merrier" and revealed Autechre themselves had secretly released fakes. He also said that the leaker's "sense of priority is clearly fucked" as they treated a hoax beheading of a US marine in Iraq and the fake leak as equally relevant.

Untilted was released on CD and double vinyl on 18 April 2005 through Warp Records. The album was released slightly earlier on CD on 9 April through Beat Records, only in Japan. The album's artwork was created by Alex Rutterford.

The album entered the UK Dance Albums Chart at No. 25 for two weeks, the UK Independent Albums Chart at No. 22 for one week and the US Top Dance Albums chart at No. 17 for one week. The duo went on tour in support of the album, which began on 14 April. The tour lasted for seven weeks and saw them play in Europe, the United States and Japan.

Booth moved from Suffolk to Manchester after the conclusion of the tour, with Brown noting this put their studio "in limbo for a while". The two found themselves working more portably with laptops and gear from their concerts. They continued composing new tracks in a variety of studio jam sessions, leading to the release of Quaristice in 2008.

== Reception ==
Professional ratings
Aggregate scores
Source	Rating
Metacritic	69/100
Review scores
Source	Rating
Austin American-Statesman	3/5 stars
AllMusic	3.5/5 stars
The Gazette	3.5/5 stars
The Guardian	3/5 stars
The Independent	2/5 stars
Pitchfork	7.4/10
PopMatters	8/10
Stylus	B−
The Winnipeg Sun	3.5/5 stars

Untilted received mixed reviews from critics. At Metacritic, which aggregates scores from mainstream critics, Untilted has an average score of 69 based on 20 reviews, indicating mixed or average reviews.

Writing for the Austin American-Statesman, Jeff Salamon noted the "wealth of sonic detail" after the "roadblocks" and "obstacles" throughout the album. Reviewing the album for AllMusic, John Bush noted how Autechre "certainly [weren't] launching any new styles", but the album "[represented] the duo returning to the green fields of their youth". Joshua Klein of Billboard noted how the duo had found a "middle ground between [science and art]". Writing for Exclaim!, Heidi Chapson wrote there is "something unsettling and disturbing about the erratic heart-palpitating beats of Untilted that makes it too intriguing to just ignore". T'cha Dunlevy of The Gazette noted that the album was "music for electronica sleuths ready to work for their epiphanies" and that the duo were not "concerned with your comfort zone". In a review for The Guardian, John Burgess said Autechre were "sounding too much like themselves".

Writing for The Independent, Andy Gill called the album "the electronic equivalent of Tourette's". Through the use of a skit, Dominique Leone of Pitchfork said Untilted was both moving and had a "pretty messy, lazy form". Tim O'Neil of PopMatters said the album didn't have "a lot to grab on to" for casual listeners, but more dedicated fans would be "significantly changed by the experience". Writing for Stylus, Scott McKeating said the duo may have "found that blend of soft tissue and steel that much electronica misses by a hair's breadth". Darryl Sterdan of The Winnipeg Sun noted there was "occasionally the sensation of a human hand, head and heart behind the machinery".

== Track listing ==
All tracks are written by Sean Booth and Rob Brown.

Untilted track listing
No.	Title	Length
1.	"LCC"	7:46
2.	"Ipacial Section"	9:57
3.	"Pro Radii"	8:42
4.	"Augmatic Disport"	9:27
5.	"Iera"	4:55
6.	"Fermium"	5:45
7.	"The Trees"	7:26
8.	"Sublimit"	15:52
Total length:		69:50

Japanese bonus track
No.	Title	Length
9.	"Zurich 2001"	1:52
Total length:		71:52

== Personnel ==
Credits adapted from the liner notes.

- Rob Brown – production
- Sean Booth – production
- Noel Summerville – mastering
- Alex Rutterford – design

== Charts ==
Chart performance for Untilted
Chart (2005)	Peak position
US Top Dance Albums (Billboard)	17
UK Dance Albums (Official Charts)	25
UK Independent Albums (Official Charts)	22
