= Draft 7.30 =

Studio album by Autechre
- Released: 7 April 2003
- Recorded: July 2001 - October 2002
- Genres: Abstract; electronic; experimental; IDM
- Length: 62:46
- Label: Warp
- Producers: Rob Brown; Sean Booth

Autechre chronology
Gantz Graf (2002)	Draft 7.30 (2003)	Untilted (2005)

Draft 7.30 is the seventh studio album by British electronic music duo Autechre. The album was released on 7 April 2003 through Warp Records. Comprising abstract, electronic, experimental IDM music, Draft 7.30 was seen as a return to form for the duo compared to Confield (2001). Across its 15-month recording period from July 2001 to October 2002, production focused more on digital processes and analog equipment, as opposed to primarily generative features like on Confield. Sonically, the album focuses on more standard rhythm and percussion, frequently introducing new melodies and sounds.

Promotional copies of the album were sent to reviewers as cassette tapes per suggestion of Warp, since their audio quality was considered superior and because Sean Booth wanted to discourage leaks of the album before its release. Artwork for the album was produced by Alex Rutterford. The album was generally received positively by critics; while it was regarded as an impressive and compelling return to form, some saw its lack of innovation and its overly experimental nature as negatives. Commercially, it charted on the UK Independent Albums chart. With Billboard, it charted on the Independent Albums chart, and fared better on the US Top Dance Albums chart at number nine.

== Background ==
Autechre are a British electronic music duo consisting of members Rob Brown and Sean Booth. The duo's debut album, Incunabula, released in 1993 through Warp Records and saw positive reviews from music critics. Booth and Brown later released albums like Tri Repetae (1995) and LP5 (1998), which were equally well-received by music critics. As the duo continued to produce music, their music became more experimental, notably with the release of Confield (2001) as they used software like Max to create generative music.

== Production ==
Draft 7.30 began production after Confield in July 2001, finishing production in October 2002. Booth recorded parts of Draft 7.30 within Suffolk, while Brown recorded in London. The album's title refers to it being the duo's seventh draft and thirtieth revision of the project. After they got to "Draft 7", its name changed as they continued to make revisions, e.g. "Draft 7.1" and "Draft 7.2", before finally landing at "Draft 7.30". Booth said the duo originally felt limited by rhythm, though this would change, as he felt they were now "totally fluent in it and can be more expressive".

In contrast to Confield, which used a wide range of software and audio plug-ins, Booth and Brown agreed to refrain from downloading new software for the production of the album. The album also made use of analog synthesisers in addition to digital processes, as according to Booth, analog technology "deals with curving, constantly changing values, and it doesn't reduce everything to a series of steps". Additionally, while Confield primarily made use of generative music and functions within Max, Draft 7.30's production was "really straight", utilising normal sequencers and samplers. Tracks were written note by note, with "Reniform Puls" being the only track to make use of generative features.

MIDI controllers and automation within Digital Performer were used during production. The duo's most frequently used gear during this time included Mackie 8-Bus mixing consoles, a Shure Auxpander, and a Powerbook G4 with Max, Digital Performer, Logic Pro, and Cubase SX. Analogue equipment included instruments like the Roland SH-201, Korg MS-10, and MS20. The names of tracks on Draft 7.30 range from nonsense, to real working titles used by the duo, to code names given to tracks of similar characteristics. "6IE.CR" was originally named "606IE" due to its manipulation of a 606, "Reniform Puls" means "kidney-shaped pulse", (Note: The definition of "Reniform" is "kidney-shaped", while Booth said "Puls" is simply "pulse" without the "e".) "Surripere" is the Latin root word of "surreptitious", and the "Sudden" in "Theme of Sudden Roundabout" refers to a suburb within Rochdale, where Booth and Brown met.

== Composition ==
=== Overview ===
Musically, Draft 7.30 has been described as abstract, electronic, experimental, and IDM. The album was widely regarded by critics as a return to form for the band after the abstract, glitchy tracks from Confield, which some said alienated listeners and merely showcased Booth and Brown's "programming prowess", rather than being enjoyable music. Contrastingly, the general composition of Draft 7.30 focuses more on standard rhythm and percussion while frequently introducing new elements and sounds. Standard forms of melody can also be heard. Critics also discussed apparent hip-hop, techno, and dance influences present within the album.

=== Tracks 1–5 ===
"Surripere"
Noted as a highlight of Draft 7.30, "Surripere" is a 12-minute track with morphing rhythm patterns and swelling melodies.

"Xylin Room" opens the album; the track doesn't start until twenty seconds in, where an "uptempo, polyrhythmic stutter beat" and chopped up synthesizers can be heard. The track makes use of metallic-like sonic textures and a "squelching 303-like bass"; one critic described the track as "skull percussion played with wooden fists". "IV VV IV VV VIII" borrows influences from Confield throughout, though stripped down. Its sound also borrows from dub music. The track makes use of sample manipulation throughout, coupled with ambient soundscapes and a beat comprising "off-center snare slaps". "6IE.CR" was described as a "solid electro banger", borrowing influences from hip-hop and Detroit electro. It makes use of a repetitive beat throughout, along with "crushed synth melodies". The track's "meticulous sound design" was also described as a highlight.

"Tapr" is a brief track, composed of reverberated "seemingly random synth tones", modified piano, and "low thuds". A review of the album for BBC Music called it "perhaps the most gorgeous of the ten tracks". "Surripere" is a 12-minute "epic of deliciously chilly atmospheres", taking simple rhythm patterns before transforming and changing them across the track's runtime, though it does not become unrecognizable. Its composition also makes use of "swelling synths" and lacks significant amounts of audio manipulation, in contrast to other parts of the album. Consensus among critics notes "Surripere" as a highlight of the album, with one review calling it a "masterpiece". An Uncut review likened it to a "toughened-up Aphex Twin" track.

=== Tracks 6–10 ===
"Theme of Sudden Roundabout" is a dance music-esque track, comprising a "squelching beat" while also borrowing hip-hop influences and interesting sound design. The track's "[warbling]" melodies were noted as reminiscent of the "minimal watercolor" from other Warp Records artists. A review of the album for No Ripcord also compared the track's melodies to that of Boards of Canada. "VL AL 5" uses spaced out drum patterns, utilising experimental but focused melodies; an article for The Observer described its sound as "mournful beauty". "P.:NTIL" is another hip-hop style track with "light and peppy", "jarring" beats, "squeaky and steady" melodies, and "Spartan synth-driven pulses".

"V-Proc" is composed of stuttered percussion and hip-hop, breakbeat percussion; particularly, the track's rhythm offers "brief but welcome stability". Sounds heard on the track are seen to evolve across its runtime, with an Uncut review noting the track could've ended up "[being] ambient in more clueless hands". While described as "very loud, obnoxiously metallic and atonal", "V-Proc" was noted as another highlight by critics, described as an "excellent production", "one of the album's more satisfying tracks", and "undeniably funky". "Reniform Puls" closes the album, comprising a "slow decay" which morphs into "randomized clutter and chaos". Its sound design also creates "sufficient room to breathe" for the listener.

== Release ==
=== Promotional copies ===
Promotional copies of Draft 7.30 were sent to music reviewers in the form of cassette tapes. This format was a suggestion from Warp themselves, to which Booth and Brown "jumped at the chance". Booth said he preferred sharing promo copies as cassettes or CDs as MP3 files were much lower quality comparatively. Booth said while the choice was made to prevent file sharing before the release of the album, he did not mind file sharing as a whole, saying "it doesn't really phase me that much, 'cause I think, well so long as we can keep making a living off, we'll carry on doing it. I mean, if it gets to the point where we can't earn enough money making music, then we'll just stop, you know?" Booth was also against CD copies with self-destructing dye due to concerns about the environment and their long-term playability.

=== Full release ===
Draft 7.30 was released on 7 April 2003 on both vinyl and CD through Warp Records. The album entered the UK Independent Albums chart at number fifteen, the US Independent Albums chart at number 40, and the US Top Dance Albums chart at number nine. The album charted on all three for only one week. The album's artwork was designed by Alex Rutterford, who also created the music video for Gantz Graf (2002), and later created the artwork for Untilted (2005). During the creation of the artwork, Rutterford wanted some text to go inside the tape's J-card and the album's liner notes, to which Booth and Brown wrote a large amount of nonsense code written in Pascal as a joke. Rutterford was apparently irritated by this, scaling the code down to fit the page, with parts of it cut off.

== Critical reception ==
Professional ratings
Aggregate scores
Source	Rating
Metacritic	76/100
Review scores
Source	Rating
AllMusic	4/5 stars
The Guardian	4/5 stars
Pitchfork	6.2/10
Playlouder	3/5 stars
Release Magazine	6/10
Stylus	7.7/10

Draft 7.30 received generally positive reviews. At Metacritic, which aggregates scores from mainstream critics, Draft 7.30 has an average score of 76 based on 12 reviews, indicating a score of "generally favourable".

Writing for AllMusic, John Bush said the album was more "compelling" and "inviting" than Confield, noting that "listeners might actually return for multiple listens". In a review for The A.V. Club, Andy Battaglia said the album had a "redeeming sense of purpose" and applied Confield's ideas to "less embarrassingly stunted ends". Colin Buttimer of BBC Music wrote the album represented the "sound of our technological present in all its intricacy and resultant strangeness". Writing for The Guardian, Pascal Wyse noted the album contained "shards of musical convention" and showed Autechre's resistance to conventional norms of dance music. An Uncut review said the album saw Booth and Brown "cautiously reconnect with humanity", while a review written for Igloo Magazine said the album saw Autechre "[drafting] the blueprints of electronics for several years to come". Writing for No Ripcord, Sam Draper stated the album had a more focused approach to its tracks than on Confield, though noted fan opinion was still divided. Of Draft 7.30 as a whole, Mattias Huss of Release Magazine said: "Autechre is creating something without quite knowing what, something new and not quite controllable. I would like to think there is no purpose to it at all, and that the beauty of it lies precisely in that zen-like aimlessness."

"There's one strain of opinion, then another one comes in reinforced numbers. Mostly, we'd been hearing that this one was more accessible than Confield. But then someone comes along and fucks it all up and tells us that they think it's the coldest, hardest work we've ever done. 'Confield was so warm, what are you up to?"' "We've had it all,"

— Sean Booth on the reception to Confield and Draft 7.30, 2003

In a review for The Observer, Kitty Empire described Draft 7.30 as "reliably truculent, crisp and not a little scary, like a soundtrack to a DVD of bad dreams that skips a lot". Joshua Klein of the Chicago Tribune called the album a "curious step sideways" due to its lack of innovation compared to Confield. Writing for The Daily Telegraph, Andrew Perry called the album "fascinating, rather than lovable" due to the duo's apparent refusal to "leaven their experimentation with a dash of melody". A review for The Independent written by Andy Gill referred to Draft 7.30 as "music that's more agreeable as theory than praxis". Dominique Leone of Pitchfork wrote that "an unfortunate combination of familiar methods, beats and timbres won't overshadow the ultimately uninspiring music". In a review for Ultimate Guitar, it was noted that while the album was not a "revolutionary leap forward many fans all but demand", the album was still a "solidly crafted effort". Writing for Playlouder, Iain Moffat wrote that the album "can sometimes feel like a slightly unfinished piece of work", though it was a "unqualified success" in terms of a return to form. Michael Heumann of Stylus Magazine said that while Draft 7.30 succeeds sometimes, it was a "mixed bag" and often gave into clichés of their previous work, though Heumann also noted "even Autechre's clichés are more interesting than nearly everything else you'll hear this year".

== Track listing ==
All tracks are written by Sean Booth and Rob Brown.

No.	Title	Length
1.	"Xylin Room"	6:09
2.	"IV VV IV VV VIII"	4:50
3.	"6IE.CR"	5:38
4.	"Tapr"	3:14
5.	"Surripere"	11:23
6.	"Theme of Sudden Roundabout"	4:51
7.	"VL AL 5"	4:56
8.	"P.:NTIL"	7:07
9.	"V-Proc"	6:00
10.	"Reniform Puls"	8:38
Total length:		62:46

== Personnel ==
Credits are adapted from the liner notes.

- Rob Brown – production
- Sean Booth – production
- Alex Rutterford – artwork
- Noel Summerville – mastering

== Charts ==
Chart performance for Draft 7.30
Chart (2003)	Peak position
US Top Dance Albums (Billboard)	9
US Independent Albums (Billboard)	40
UK Independent Albums (Official Charts)	15
