= Plus (Autechre album) =

Studio album by Autechre
- Released: 28 October 2020
- Recorded: 2018 – 2020
- Genre: IDM; glitch; ambient; electronic; abstract
- Length: 63:53 (Standard); 67:37 (Japanese Edition)
- Label: Warp
- Producer: Rob Brown; Sean Booth

Autechre chronology
Sign (2020)	Plus (2020)	AE 2022– (2023)

Plus (often stylized as PLUS) is the fifteenth studio album by British electronic music duo Autechre. It was released digitally with no prior announcement on 28 October 2020 through Warp Records. Plus was released twelve days after Sign, the band's previous album. The album was released on physical formats on 20 November 2020. Critics noted that Plus took a more percussive approach compared to the duo's previous album. The cover and packaging artwork for the release was created by The Designers Republic.

== Background ==
Similarly to the tracks on Sign, the songs that ended up on Plus were recorded between 2018 and 2019 immediately after the duo finished touring, with production finishing up in February 2020. In an interview, Booth stated that he and Rob Brown hadn't shared any tracks with each other for "almost a year" before production started on the two albums. Sign and Plus were both teased prior to release in a series of Autechre live mix sessions that aired on streaming service Mixlr during the COVID-19 pandemic.

== Composition ==
Plus has been described as electronic, IDM, glitch, abstract and ambient. Critics noted that Plus was a lot more abrasive than Sign and featured more glitchy and percussive elements. In a review for Clash, Nick Roseblade called the opening track "DekDre Scap B" "ungainly and ill formed in places" and that it featured "scratchy percussion, juddering basslines, and haunting synths". Roseblade also discussed the closing track "TM1 open", the third longest song on the album, calling it a "slavering grating acid techno beast". Josh Sand of Beats Per Minute called the track "lux 106 mod" a "beatless utopian bubbling melody" and compared it to an orchestra tuning up. Sand also discussed the similarities in the track "ecol4" to the "hip-hop-infused days of 1997's Envane".

In a piece for Exclaim!, Peter Boulos commented on the "levitating and descending synthetics" of "7FM ic". Boulos also called the track "X4" "frantic" and described its "warped, acidic basslines" that "scaffold in unpredictable ways". Evan Snyder of Igloo Magazine compared the track "marhide" to a "surprisingly 808’ed kit drenched in static hiss, cowbell and all". Snyder also discussed "ecol4", commenting on its resemblance to a track on Confield. AllMusic's Paul Simpson described the album's opener "DeckDre Scap B" as a "series of splatters, stutters, and convulsions" held together by a faint pulse. Simpson also named the closer "TM1 open", referring to it as a "a fizzy whirlwind of twinkling notes and acid squirts".

== Release ==
Plus was released with no prior announcement onto digital streaming platforms on 28 October 2020 through Warp Records. This release came twelve days after the release of the duo's previous album, Sign. Physical CD and 2xLP versions were released on 20 November 2020.

== Critical reception ==
Professional ratings
Aggregate scores
Source	Rating
Metacritic	82/100
Review scores
Source	Rating
AllMusic	4/5 stars
Beats Per Minute	74%
Clash	8/10
Exclaim!	8/10

As with Sign, Plus was met with positive reviews from critics. At Metacritic, which aggregates scores from mainstream critics, Sign has an average score of 82 based on 5 reviews, indicating "critical acclaim".

In a review for AllMusic, Paul Simpson concluded that the album's "greater focus on rhythm" holds the album together more strongly than Sign. Reviewing the album for Beats Per Minute, Josh Sand stated that while Sign was "probably the wise choice to release (and hear) first", the album was a "better microcosm" of the duo. Clash writer Nick Roseblade wrote that it was "unfair to compare Sign and Plus", giving an example of the Radiohead albums Kid A and Amnesiac. Sand concluded that both are "solid albums, but they aren't about similar things." Writing for Exclaim!, Peter Boulos called Plus a "stronger example of Autechre's range than Sign" and commented that any new music from the duo was "always a treat by any measure". Evan Snyder of Igloo said that the album "reads like a counterpoint to the prior album's emotive, warm and introspective narrative with its abstraction, playfulness and generative bounce."

== Track listing ==
All tracks are written by Sean Booth and Rob Brown

Plus track listing
No.	Title	Length
1.	"DekDre Scap B"	2:46
2.	"7FM ic"	5:56
3.	"marhide"	3:43
4.	"ecol4"	14:51
5.	"lux 106 mod"	5:06
6.	"X4"	12:21
7.	"ii.pre esc"	4:47
8.	"esle 0"	3:13
9.	"TM1 open"	11:07
Total length:		63:53

Japanese bonus track
No.	Title	Length
10.	"p1p2"	3:44
Total length:		67:37

== Charts ==
Chart performance for Plus
Chart (2020)	Peak position
Belgian Albums (Ultratop Flanders)	46
Belgian Albums (Ultratop Wallonia)	163
Scottish Albums (OCC)	96
