= Autechre =

English electronic music duo

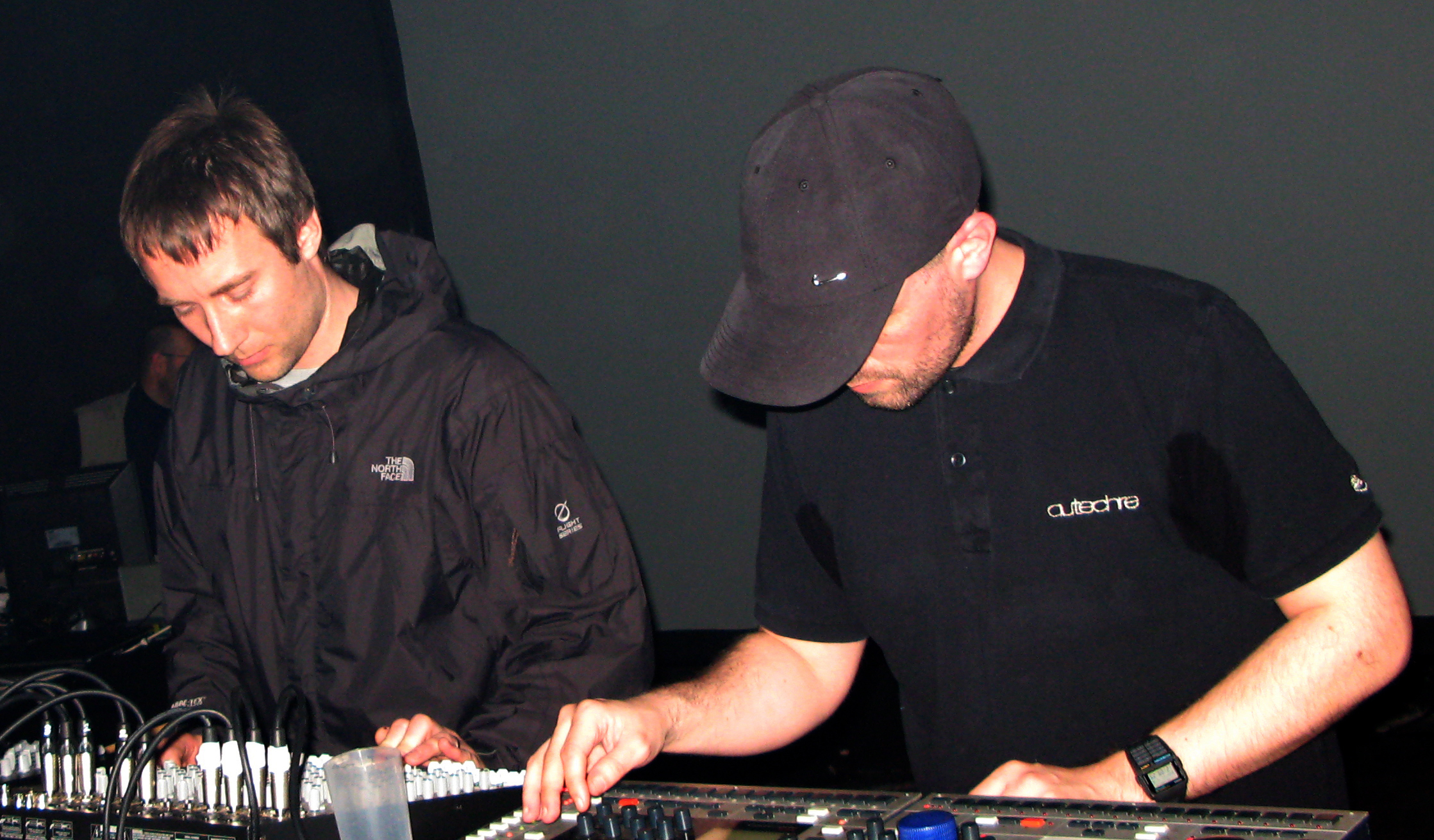
- Rob Brown (left) and Sean Booth (right) performing live as Autechre in 2007

Background information
- Also known as: Lego Feet
- Origin: Rochdale, Greater Manchester, England
- Genres: Electronic; IDM; ambient; techno; glitch; experimental
- Years active: 1987–present
- Labels: Warp; Skam; Wax Trax!; TVT; Nothing
- Members: Sean Booth; Robert Brown
- Website: autechre.ws

Autechre (/ɔːˈtɛkər/ aw-TEK-ər) are an English electronic music duo consisting of Rob Brown and Sean Booth, both from Rochdale, Greater Manchester. Formed in 1987, they are among the best known acts signed to UK electronic label Warp Records, through which all of Autechre's albums have been released, beginning with their 1993 debut, Incunabula. They gained initial recognition when they were featured on Warp's 1992 compilation, Artificial Intelligence.

Influenced by styles such as 1980s electro and hip-hop, the music of Autechre has evolved throughout their career from early, melodic techno recordings to later works often considered abstract and experimental, featuring complex composition and few stylistic conventions. Their work has been associated with the 1990s electronic genre known as intelligent dance music (IDM), though Booth has dismissed the label as "silly".

== History ==
=== Early years (1987–1992) ===
Rob Brown and Sean Booth met in 1987 through friends in Manchester's graffiti and breakdance scene. Shaped by Manchester's electro, hip-hop and acid house scenes, they began by exchanging cassette mixes before making their own tracks with inexpensive equipment, including a Casio SK-1 sampler and a Roland TR-606 drum machine. Their first release was a self-titled 12-inch issued under the alias Lego Feet by Manchester's Skam Records.

The pair's first release as Autechre was the 1991 single "Cavity Job". Booth has given the pronunciation of Autechre as "awe-teh-ker" (/ɔːˈtɛkər/ aw-TEK-ər). He later said the name originated while the duo were working on an Atari: the first two letters were chosen for an "au" sound, while the rest were "bashed randomly on the keyboard".

In 1992, Autechre signed to Warp Records and contributed "Crystel" and "The Egg" to the Warp compilation Artificial Intelligence. "The Egg" was later reworked as "Eggshell" for their 1993 debut album Incunabula.

In 2019, archival material from this period was broadcast on NTS Radio as Warp Tapes 89-93 during Warp's 30th-anniversary programming and released as a free download through the AE Store.

=== Incunabula and Amber (1993–1994) ===
Warp released Autechre's debut album, Incunabula, in November 1993. The album included "Eggshell", a reworking of "The Egg", which the duo had contributed to Warp's 1992 compilation Artificial Intelligence. Incunabula reached number three on Music Week's Independent Albums chart. Rob Brown later described Incunabula as "more of a compilation of old material", contrasting it with Amber, which he called "the first album we put out on Warp".

In 1994, the duo released Basscadet Mixes, an EP of versions of the Incunabula track "Basscadet". Their second album, Amber, followed later that year. Compared with their debut, critics have described Amber as more ambient and less tied to Autechre's early techno roots, while still containing traces of techno and acid house.

Shortly before Amber, Autechre released Anti EP, a protest against the then-proposed Criminal Justice and Public Order Bill. The bill's rave provisions defined music as including sounds "wholly or predominantly characterised by the emission of a succession of repetitive beats". The EP's packaging stated that "Lost" and "Djarum" contained repetitive beats, while "Flutter" had been programmed so that no bars contained identical beats; it advised DJs to have "a lawyer and a musicologist" present in the event of police harassment. Proceeds from the EP were donated to the civil liberties group Liberty.

=== Tri Repetae, Chiastic Slide and LP5 (1995–1999) ===
A frame from the video for "Second Bad Vilbel"

In 1995, Warp released Autechre's third album, Tri Repetae, along with the EPs Garbage and Anvil Vapre. Retrospective reviews have described Tri Repetae as a shift away from the warmer, more melodic sound of Incunabula and Amber, emphasising harsher, more mechanical textures while retaining links to hip-hop and techno. The Anvil Vapre track "Second Bad Vilbel" received a promotional video directed by Chris Cunningham.

Autechre released Chiastic Slide in 1997; the same year, Warp also issued the EPs Envane and Cichlisuite. In a 2017 retrospective, Chris Zaldua of Fact described Chiastic Slide as a pivotal album in Autechre's catalogue, arguing that it marked a turn from the beat-centred character of earlier releases towards a more textural and abstract approach.

The duo's fifth album, an untitled 1998 release commonly known as LP5, followed the next year. Pitchfork later characterised it as one of the points in Autechre's catalogue where complex programming and relative accessibility were most closely balanced. In 1999, Warp released Peel Session, recorded for John Peel's BBC Radio 1 programme in 1995, and EP7, which Pitchfork noted was an EP in name despite its album-length running time.

=== Confield, Draft 7.30 and Untilted (2000–2007) ===
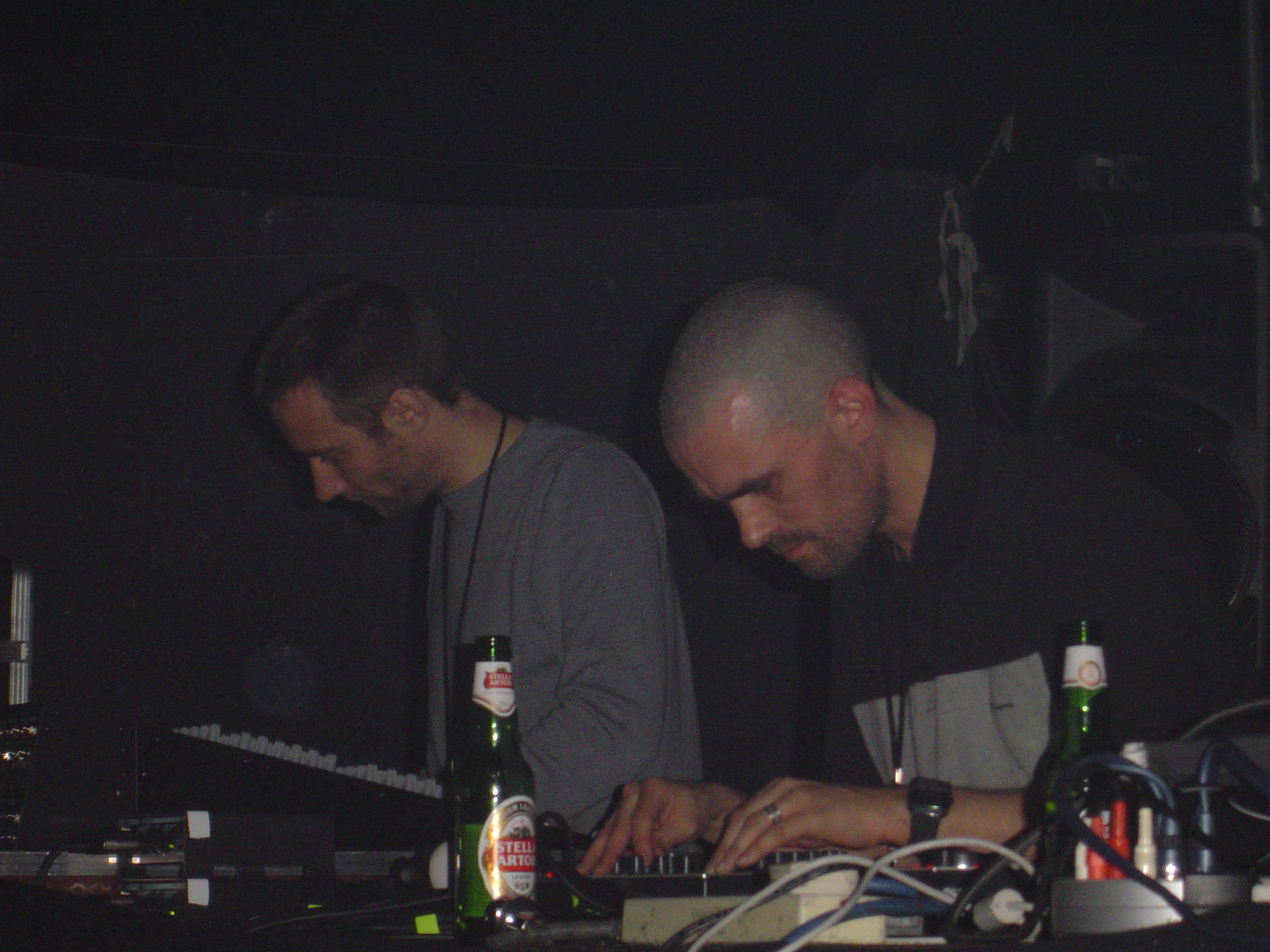
Autechre performing live at SeOne in London in 2005

Autechre's second John Peel session, originally broadcast in September 1999, was released by Warp as Peel Session 2 in 2000. Their sixth album, Confield, followed in 2001. Pitchfork described it as one of the duo's most abstract and difficult releases, characterising the album as a set of ordered soundscapes built from textural, dissonant and atonal repetition. Booth later said that much of Confield grew out of experiments with Max that were not suited to a club environment.

In 2002, Autechre released the three-track Gantz Graf EP. The release was accompanied by a DVD containing a computer-animated video for the title track directed by Alex Rutterford. Pitchfork described the EP as a partial return to more rhythmically direct material after Confield, while still extending the duo's recent abstract approach.

Draft 7.30 followed in 2003. Pitchfork presented it as more rhythmically graspable than Confield, writing that the record foregrounded beats and melodies more clearly than its predecessor, while still dividing listeners over whether it represented a return to form or a refinement of familiar methods. Booth said in a 2003 interview that rhythm no longer seemed to limit the group, adding that they had become "totally fluent" in it.

Autechre released Untilted in 2005. In a 2005 interview, Booth said the album contained "no generative work", contrasting it with the generative and software-based methods associated with Confield. The release was followed by a tour through Europe, North America and Japan. Brown later said that the tour, Booth's move from Suffolk to Manchester and a more portable working setup helped shape the sessions that led to the shorter, jam-derived tracks of Quaristice in 2008.

=== Quaristice, Oversteps and Exai (2008–2013) ===
Autechre's ninth album, Quaristice, was released by Warp in 2008. It marked a structural change from Untilted, consisting of 20 shorter tracks rather than the duo's longer, more continuously developing pieces. Brown said the album followed the 2005 Untilted tour and Booth's move from Suffolk to Manchester, during which the duo adopted a more portable working setup and generated weeks of multichannel audio from jam sessions. The resulting material was edited into shorter tracks, with longer versions left aside. The album was later expanded by the download-only Quaristice.Quadrange.ep.ae, a set of extended and alternate versions whose runtime is around 150 minutes.

In 2010, Autechre released their tenth album, Oversteps. Pitchfork described it as quieter and more atmospheric than Quaristice, leaning toward the slower and more ambient aspects of albums such as Amber while placing greater emphasis on texture than steady beats. Later that year, the duo released Move of Ten, a ten-track companion release that Pitchfork characterised as a beat-driven counterpart to Oversteps, emphasising sharper rhythms and more direct links to techno and electro.

In 2011, Warp issued EPs 1991–2002, a retrospective box set collecting 47 tracks from Autechre's EPs across the first eleven years of their recording career.

The duo's eleventh studio album, Exai, was released in 2013. Originally scheduled for physical release in March, it was made available digitally in February; the album contained 17 tracks and ran for about two hours. Pitchfork described Exai as Autechre's longest album to that point and noted that it ranged from bass-heavy beat tracks to more amorphous drone-based material. The album was followed later that year by L-event, an EP that Pitchfork described as closely related to the Exai material.

=== AE_LIVE, elseq 1–5 and NTS Sessions (2014–2018) ===
Autechre performed at Warp's 25th-anniversary event Warp25 in Kraków in September 2014, and toured North America the following year. Recordings from this period were released as AE_LIVE, a series of digital live albums. The initial 2015 release collected four sets recorded in 2014, followed by additional 2015 recordings later that year.

In May 2016, Autechre released their twelfth studio album, elseq 1–5, through their Warp-hosted webstore. The five-part release contained 21 tracks, including the previously issued "feed1". Pitchfork described the release as more than four hours long and noted that it had no planned CD or vinyl edition; the review also presented elseq 1–5 as an extension of Autechre's recent live sets, with a richer range of sounds.

In April 2018, Autechre broadcast four two-hour sessions of new material on NTS Radio. The material was later collected as NTS Sessions 1–4, an eight-hour release issued digitally and in 8-CD and 12-LP physical editions. Booth said the project was conceived as a radio show after the duo realised they had enough material in their software patches to fill eight hours, and that the tracks were edited and sequenced with that format in mind. Pitchfork described NTS Sessions 1–4 as Autechre's longest experiment to that point, placing it in continuity with Exai, AE_LIVE and elseq 1–5 as part of the duo's move toward large-scale digital releases.

=== Sign, Plus and AE_2022– (2020–present) ===
In April 2020, Autechre released AE_LIVE 2016/2018, a set of seven live recordings from concerts in 2016 and 2018. Later that year, Warp announced Sign, Autechre's first standard-length studio album since 2013's Exai; it was released on 16 October 2020. Booth said the duo began building the album's software rig in summer 2018, after their Australian tour, and finished the material in February 2020. Pitchfork described Sign as a comparatively compact and direct release after the duo's large-scale digital projects of the preceding decade.

Plus followed twelve days later as a surprise digital release on 28 October 2020, with vinyl and CD editions released on 20 November.

After the two 2020 studio albums, Autechre returned to releasing live-recording series. In August 2023, the duo released seven 2022 recordings under the title AE_LIVE 2022–; the sets were recorded in six European cities and ranged from 60 to 80 minutes. In November 2024, they added twelve recordings from 2023 and 2024 under the title AE_2022–, amounting to about 14 hours of music. In a 2024 interview with Metal, Booth said the concept of the studio album had become outdated for him, while Brown described the duo's current approach as performing, recording the sessions and releasing those recordings.

In December 2024, Autechre were BBC Radio 6 Music artists in residence, broadcasting four one-hour programmes from 9 to 12 December. In 2025, the duo announced European and North American dates, including their first North American tour in a decade; the North American itinerary was later expanded, and Pitchfork reported that recordings from the shows could become part of the ongoing AE_2022– series. In December 2025, Autechre announced 2026 dates in Japan and Europe, including a London show described by Pitchfork as their biggest headline date to that point.

== Influences ==
A wide variety of influences have been noted as discernible in Autechre's music. The duo's roots in tagging, early hip-hop and electro music, and b-boy culture in general are still evident, with many reviews noting hip-hop rhythms—sometimes heavily obscured or processed, and sometimes explicit even in later work. All of Autechre's live webcasts have featured large amounts of early hip-hop and electro. In a review of Oversteps, The Wire noted "Treale" as being "a reminder of Booth and Brown's musical apprenticeship as teenage B-boys".

As Autechre's music and studio setup evolved, reviews started to note influences from farther afield; experiments in generative synthesis, musique concrète and FM synthesis drew comparisons with Iannis Xenakis, Karlheinz Stockhausen and Bernard Parmegiani from critics such as Paul Morley. The group have mentioned musique concrète composers Tod Dockstader and Edgard Varèse as influences. Autechre also cite Coil as a major influence, with an unfinished collaboration of unknown completeness occurring around the release of LP5 and EP7. Chris Richards of The Washington Post stated in 2015 that Autechre create "some of the most complicated music you could ever hope to drown in" and are "recognized as pioneers in experimental music". Autechre's work has been described as "music that sounds like it designed itself, with audio fractals that change constantly like living organisms".

While accepting her British Dance Act award at the Brit Awards 2025, Charli XCX shouted Autechre out in her speech, among other dance acts she had been influenced by.

Hyperpop pioneers SOPHIE and A. G. Cook have described themselves as fans of Autechre, with SOPHIE saying they are her "heroes" and A. G. Cook remarking that he "loves" NTS Sessions. In a 2007 interview, Tim Hecker claimed he was originally inspired by Autechre to begin making music.

== Live performances ==
Autechre is known to perform shows that are in pitch black darkness, with no lights on; attendees are warned beforehand of the show conditions. Brown opined that that people are less distracted this way, with Booth adding that the experience is "much more immersive".

== Recording ==
Booth and Brown record tracks collaboratively, but in separate studios with identical software and equipment. The process, as Booth describes in a 2020 interview with The New York Times, involves one sending a track to another, which is sent back with revisions before it is deemed finished. Brown remarks that, although they "behave differently, we sometimes try to achieve the same goal, but with greatly differing approaches (as) we really do get off on the fact that we're on the same page most of the time."

=== Equipment ===
Autechre use many different digital synths and a few analogue synths in their production, as well as analogue and digital drum machines, such as the Roland R-8, mixers, effects units and samplers. They have also made extensive use of a variety of computer based sequencers, software synthesisers, and other applications as a means of controlling those synths and processing the synthesised sounds. Much of the hardware and software they use has been customised by the band themselves. Autechre have also experimented in depth with development environments such as Max/MSP, and Kyma, amongst others, from 1997 onwards. From 2005 until 2009, they have used the Elektron Machinedrum and Monomachine, alongside Akai MPC and Nord Modular in their live performances. It has also been rumoured that Autechre have used military equipment in their work. In 2008, Sean Booth reported that if he were locked in a cell for a year with only one piece of software and one piece of hardware, he'd "probably take a copy of Digital Performer and an AKG C1000 microphone."

Other machines that Autechre have repeatedly mentioned in interviews are appreciated for their interface and aesthetics as much as their sound, including the Roland TR-606 and MC-202, and the Nord Lead. According to the 2016 interview to Resident Advisor, both members haven't bought a piece of equipment "in the last 5 years", making Max/MSP a primary production method, with Sean Booth stating that "in Max I can generally build the thing I need, and if I don't know how to do that it'll generally be worthwhile learning." Booth said that they use MAX as MIDI "only handles a limited set of information" and that instruments like the piano "separates the artist from the string".

=== Collaborations, remixes and covers ===
Both Booth and Brown are known to have been heavily involved with the majority of releases by the mysterious Gescom collective, although Booth admitted in an interview that around 20 to 30 musicians overall are connected with what he describes as an "umbrella project". Three elaborately packaged albums (æ^{3}o & h^{3}æ, æo^{3} & ^{3}hæ, and ha^{3}oe & ah^{3}eo) have been made by Autechre in collaboration with Andrew M. McKenzie's ongoing Hafler Trio project. These albums are significantly more minimal than any other Autechre release, featuring dense, claustrophobic and noisy drones. A track called "Elephant Gear", credited to both Autechre and Canadian breakcore musician Venetian Snares under the alias AEVSVS, was released on a compilation in tribute to Elektron co-founder Daniel Hansson, who died in a car accident. Autechre have collaborated with several artists for live performances, including Zoviet France, Fennesz and Roedelius. 3. Telepathics Meh In-Sect Connection, an album by Sean Booth in collaboration with Mika Vainio of Pan Sonic and Kouhei Matsunaga, was released in early 2010.

In 2009 they contributed a cover of an LFO song to the Warp20 compilation, as well as having their song "Tilapia" covered by John Callaghan.

The compilation CD The Only Blip Hop Record You Will Ever Need, Vol. 1, issued in 2002 by David Byrne's Luaka Bop Records, contains a cover version of "Gnit" performed by Marie + Scratch. It is performed using only human voice samples.

The band Pink Freud has performed covers of several Autechre numbers, including "Basscadet", "Cichli" and "Bike"; a full live album of covers entitled Pink Freud Plays Autechre was released in 2016. In 2026, Shane Parish released Autechre Guitar, an album of Autechre covers adapted to acoustic guitar.

Autechre helped initiate the All Tomorrow's Parties music festival in 2000, and curated the 2003 festival.

=== Radio ===
Autechre have been involved with radio since their early days, originally DJing for IBC Radio, a Manchester pirate radio station in 1991, where they had their own show playing Belgian techno alongside their own demos. Later they would appear as part of Gescom for their weekly "Disengage" show on Manchester's Kiss FM.

Booth and Brown are also known to have contributed (anonymously) to a weekly pirate radio show which aired live at midnight Saturday night in Sheffield from 1994 to 1995, hosted by DJ Jez Potter (who went on to found the noted 'Fear of a Crap Planet' club night in Brighton) alongside fellow Sheffield residents Robert E. Baker, Mark Fell and Mat Steel. No official recordings of these sometimes particularly lengthy broadcasts, often extending to many hours—which featured the above named artists performing using vinyl, tape, CDs, MiniDisc, as well as various other hardware and software—are known to exist.

=== Webcasts ===
Autechre have streamed many live DJ mixes of often extreme length as webcasts, including five to coincide with album releases:

- A nearly nine-hour live mix on 10–11 April 2005 (GMT) to coincide with the release of Untilted
- A twelve-hour live stream on 23–24 February 2008 to coincide with the release of Quaristice
- A twelve-and-a-half-hour live stream spanning 6 pm to 6:30 am (GMT) on 2–3 March 2010 to coincide with the release of Oversteps
- Two separate ten-hour live streams from 8 pm to 6 am (GMT) on 2–3 March 2013 to coincide with the release of Exai
- A 12-hour mix via radio-streaming platform Mixlr on 13 October 2019
- A broadcast of Sign on 8 October to the Autechre website
- A five-and-a-half-hour-long mix on Mixlr streamed on 30 December 2022
- A 2¼-hour-long "Mix for Neuvoids" released on 20 June 2023 on SoundCloud for the Neuvoids label.

== Discography ==
Studio albums

- Incunabula (1993)
- Amber (1994)
- Tri Repetae (1995)
- Chiastic Slide (1997)
- LP5 (1998)
- Confield (2001)
- Draft 7.30 (2003)
- Untilted (2005)
- Quaristice (2008)
- Oversteps (2010)
- Exai (2013)
- elseq 1–5 (2016)
- NTS Sessions 1–4 (2018)
- Sign (2020)
- Plus (2020)
