= Elseq 1–5 =

elseq 1–5

Studio album by Autechre
- Released: 19 May 2016
- Genres: IDM; electronic; experimental
- Length: 52:19 (elseq 1); 45:34 (elseq 2); 53:27 (elseq 3); 46:52 (elseq 4); 49:26 (elseq 5); 247:38 (elseq 1–5)
- Label: Warp
- Producers: Rob Brown; Sean Booth

Autechre chronology
AE_LIVE (2015)	elseq 1–5 (2016)	NTS Sessions 1–4 (2018)

elseq 1–5 is the twelfth studio album by British electronic music duo Autechre. It was released by Warp Records on 19 May 2016. The album consists of five segments, each roughly 50 minutes in length. All five were made available for individual or group purchase as a digital download only, making it Autechre's first studio album without a physical release. Warp eventually issued a 5-CD box set edition on the 10th anniversary of the release in 2026.

== Production ==
In an interview with Resident Advisor, Brown explained that he and Booth had been working on tracks by sending them back and forth to each other for "quite a bit", and was not sure whether the project existed as a single album or a collection of albums or EPs.

"We don't know if it's an album, or a collection of EPs or albums or just... things. We have no idea what this actually is."

As with their previous album Exai, the album was composed using custom-made Max/MSP software patches. Unlike their previous album though, elseq 1-5 was the first album by the duo to be programmed entirely in Max with no other external instruments.

On 13 May 2016, a new track by the duo was broadcast by BBC Radio 6, titled "feed1". On 18 May 2016, a second new track was played on an Alaskan student radio station, KSUA, titled "c16 deep tread". This track was later made available for streaming on SoundCloud.

== Composition ==
elseq 1–5 has been described as electronic, IDM and experimental. Consensus among critics revealed that elseq 1–5 had a bigger focus on percussion and rhythm rather than melodies. Reviewing the album for Pitchfork, Aaron Leitko called the track "eastre" "glacial and serene" and commented on the "violent squelches" suggesting "machine-on-machine violence" in "c7b2". The track "eastre" was also discussed, which "[kicked] off the third grouping with nearly a quarter-hour of droning, unearthly string tones". "foldfree casual" contains "shimmering chords" which eventually become "more repetitive and emotionally vacant" as the rhythm is "pushed into the wings by jittery and alien rhythms".

"TBM2"
The second track on elseq 3. "TBM2" contains a repetitive thumping drum beat throughout

Critic Marc Weidenbaum detailed his thoughts on a variety of tracks from the entire compilation in a piece for Disquiet. The track "TBM2" contains "swaggering cybernetic reggae at quarter speed". Weidenbaum also noted the "trenchant, tightly huddled affect" of the track. "eastre" contains "one phrase on repeat, a brief riff — about 12 seconds long, give or take — played over and over". In an AllMusic review of the compilation, John Buchanan brought up the track "spTh" and called it "particularly atmospheric and sinister" and commented on its "grinding, metallic chords". Buchanan also discussed the final track, "oneum", which contains "fluttering shards of dissonant pipe organ chords" which are "drenched in reverb".

A review from Resident Advisor written by Andrew Ryce called "feed1" "11 minutes of thunderous sound". Ryce called the track "elyc6 onset" "27 minutes of elaborate fiddling, loaded with sound that shudders and wobbles like organic matter" and noted a similar track, "mesh cinereaL", that "required patience". Ryce also compared its similarity to the sound of tracks from Oversteps.

== Release ==
elseq 1–5 was released on 19 May 2016 through Warp Records. It was released solely through the duo's website and streaming services. The album is broken up into five distinct parts, each with its own album and individual track artwork created by The Designers Republic. Warp Records stated that there are no plans to release the album on a physical medium, making it Autechre's first digital-only studio album release.

On 19 May 2026, the 10 year anniversary of the album, a limited edition CD box set was announced. It includes five CDs in a 12-inch printed hardback folder, as well as a 64-page art book from The Designers Republic.

== Reception ==
Professional ratings
Aggregate scores
Source	Rating
Metacritic	77/100
Review scores
Source	Rating
AllMusic	3.5/5 stars
Resident Advisor	4.1/5
Sputnikmusic	3.8/5
Pitchfork	7.0/10 (elseq 1); 6.6/10 (elseq 2); 6.9/10 (elseq 3); 7.1/10 (elseq 4); 6.8/10 (elseq 5)
Uncut	4/5 stars

elseq 1–5 was received positively by critics. At Metacritic, which aggregates scores from mainstream critics, elseq 1–5 has an average score of 77 based on 5 reviews, indicating "generally favourable" reviews.

Reviewing the album for Pitchfork, Aaron Leitko gave individual ratings of each of the volumes, but concluded by saying "elseq feels like an advancement of the duo’s recent live sets, offering a similar ratio of rhythm to noise and order to chaos, but a richer palette of sounds." John Buchanan of AllMusic gave elseq 1–5 a positive review, but noted that the album lacked accessibility for new listeners of the duo. Resident Advisor editor Andrew Ryce called the music within the album "bewildering and occasionally fun" and concluded that "elseq 1–5 is a logical next step into the unknown for two pioneers".

In a list of "10 Great 2016 Ambient/Electronic Albums", Disquiet editor Marc Weidenbaum ranked elseq 1–5 at number one, calling the collection "five LPs' worth of broken beats, industrialized entropy, and conspiratorial static". The album was also placed on Pitchfork's list of "The 20 Best Electronic Albums of 2016", where editor Philip Sherburne stated that "Sean Booth and Rob Brown’s algorithmic free-for-alls have never sounded more vivid". Sherbune also made the comparison that the music was "between cellophane crinkle and ice-crystal fractals, and flecked with stray bits of hip-hop and Stockhausen".

=== Accolades ===
Publication	Accolade	Year	Ref.
Pitchfork	The 20 Best Electronic Albums of 2016	2016	

== Track listing ==
elseq 1 (WARP 512.1)
No.	Title	Length
1.	"feed1"	11:37
2.	"c16 deep tread"	12:31
3.	"13x0 step"	8:57
4.	"pendulu hv moda"	12:15
5.	"curvcaten"	6:59
Total length:		52:19

elseq 2 (WARP 512.2)
No.	Title	Length
1.	"elyc6 0nset"	27:09
2.	"chimer 1-5-1"	5:03
3.	"c7b2"	13:22
Total length:		45:34

elseq 3 (WARP 512.3)
No.	Title	Length
1.	"eastre"	22:15
2.	"TBM2"	6:44
3.	"mesh cinereaL"	24:28
Total length:		53:27

elseq 4 (WARP 512.4)
No.	Title	Length
1.	"acdwn2"	11:52
2.	"foldfree casual"	9:49
3.	"latentcall"	14:31
4.	"artov chain"	4:04
5.	"7th slip"	6:36
Total length:		46:52

elseq 5 (WARP 512.5)
No.	Title	Length
1.	"pendulu casual"	9:01
2.	"spTh"	8:21
3.	"spaces how V"	9:57
4.	"freulaeux"	11:06
5.	"oneum"	11:01
Total length:		49:26

== Charts ==
Chart performance for elseq 1–5
Chart (2026)	Peak position
Scottish Albums (Official Charts)	87
UK Albums Sales (Official Charts)	87
UK Independent Albums (Official Charts)	29
