= Splitrmx12 =

Single by Autechre
- Released: 1 November 1999
- Length: 19:50
- Label: Warp
- Songwriter(s): Sean Booth and Rob Brown
- Producer(s): Autechre

Autechre singles chronology
"'EP7'" (1999)	"Splitrmx12" (1999)	"'Peel Session 2'" (2000)

"Splitrmx12" is a vinyl-only promotional recording by Autechre, released 1 November 1999 by Warp Records and limited to 3000 copies.

The A-side is a mashup of the tracks "Weissensee" and "Im Glück" by Neu! from their self-titled album Neu! (1972). It was previously released on the tribute album A Homage to Neu! (1998).

It remains unclear whether "Bic" or "Bic?" is the name of an existing group.

== Track listing ==
All tracks are written by Sean Booth and Rob Brown.

No.	Title	Length
1.	"Autechre Play Weissensee Against Im Glück" (Original composition by Neu!)	8:55
2.	"Autechre Play At Drowning in a Sea of Indiependance" (Original composition by Bic?)	10:55
Total length:		19:50
