= Alex Rutterford =

British director and graphic designer

Alex Rutterford is a British director and graphic designer working mostly on music videos.

Rutterford studied graphic design at the Croydon School of Art and graduated in 1991. He started his professional career by designing vernacular graphics for sets of films such as Judge Dredd. He then worked as an art director and designer, doing clothing design, logos, and album covers (for record labels such as Warp Records, One Little Indian Records, Parlophone, Sony Music). He also did computer modelling, animation and photo manipulation. He was a member of the design team lost in space where he worked as CG artist and creative director.

His most well-known works include the videos for "Gantz Graf" by Autechre, "Verbal" by Amon Tobin and "Go to Sleep" by Radiohead. Lesser known is the unofficial video he created for the Autechre track "Eutow" as part of the Channel 4 music programme Lo-fi in 2001. His short film work includes Sound Engine, an early study made for onedotzero2 set to an Autechre song; 3space, again specially made for onedotzero and set to the overture of Mozart's The Marriage of Figaro; and Monocodes. All these films and videos consist of 3D computer generated imagery, and feature visuals that follow the rhythm of the music very closely. These works were produced during his time at lost in space in the case of the onedotzero works as lost in space films.

Rutterford also designed the covers for the Autechre albums Draft 7.30 and Untilted, as well as the booklet and menu for Chris Cunningham's Directors Label DVD. In addition to this he worked as graphics designer on two music videos directed by Cunningham, namely Björk's "All Is Full of Love (1999), and Squarepusher's "Come On My Selector" (1998) for which he created the video screens. He also did the camerawork, together with Rob Bliss, for Cunningham's Rubber Johnny.

His works have appeared in onedotzero film festivals, DVD releases, and the book onedotzero Motion Blur published by Laurence King, Lovebytes, and several other digital film DVD compilations. He has won a Clio Gold and an ANDY Award. After being repped by production companies RSA and Black Dog, the promo division of RSA, for many years, he signed with Joyrider in spring 2012.

== Filmography ==
=== Music videos ===
- "Eutow" by Autechre (2001)
- "Gantz Graf" by Autechre (2002)
- "Verbal" by Amon Tobin (2002)
- "Go to Sleep. (Little Man Being Erased.)" by Radiohead (2003)
- "Write This Down" by Maxïmo Park (2012)

=== Short films ===
- Sound Engine (1998)
- Monocodes (2000)
- 3space (2000)

=== Advertisements ===
- "A Day in the Life/The Icon" for Sony PlayStation Portable (2005, agency: TBWA\London)
- "Future Construction", "Ring", "Street" for Dodge Ram 1500 (Rock 'Em Sock 'Em campaign, 2007, agency: BBDO Detroit)
- "Bass Bins", "Mojito" for Bacardi (Made to Mix campaign, 2007, agency: RKCR/Y&R London)
- "Aroma Paths" for Nescafé Collection (2008, agency: McCann-Erickson London)
- "The Journey/The Legendary Cruise Party/Bottle Cap" for Heineken (2011, agency: Publicis United Moscow)
- "Range", "cee'd/Sportage", "Picanto/Rio" (January 2013), "Sportage/pro_cee'd GT", "Picanto/Rio" (July 2013) for Kia Motors (Keyboards/Reviews & Recommendations campaign, 2012/2013, agency: Innocean Worldwide UK, London)
