= Pink Freud =

Polish music band

- Pink Freud in Warsaw (2009)

Background information
- Origin: Gdańsk, Poland
- Genres: Jazz, yass
- Years active: 1998–present
- Labels: Cpt. Sparky Records, Universal Music Polska, Mystic Production
- Members: Wojtek Mazolewski; Karol Gola; Adam Milwiw-Baron; Rafał Klimczuk
- Past members: Tomasz Ziętek; Kuba Staruszkiewicz; Tomasz Duda, Marcin Masecki; Julia Ziętek; Edyta Czerniewicz
- Website: www.pinkfreud.art.pl

Pink Freud is a Polish jazz band set up in Gdańsk in 1998 led by Wojtek Mazolewski.

== Current members ==
- Wojtek Mazolewski – bass guitar, double bass, loop sampler
- Karol Gola – saxophone
- Adam Milwiw-Baron – trumpet, trombone
- Rafał Klimczuk – drums

== Discography ==
Studio albums

Title	Album details	Peak Polish chart positions
Zawijasy	Date: 2000; Label: Cpt. Sparky Records; Formats: CD	—
Sorry Music Polska	Date: 2002; Label: Zen Possé; Formats: CD	—
Punk Freud	Date: 27 January 2007; Label: Universal Music Polska; Formats: CD	28
Monster of Jazz	Date: 16 April 2010; Label: Universal Music Polska; Formats: CD	—
Horse & Power	Date: 15 May 2012; Label: Universal Music Polska; Formats: CD	32
Pink Freud Plays Autechre	Date: 15 January 2016; Label: Mystic Production	—
piano forte brutto netto	Date: 27 November 2020; Label: Mystic Production	—
"—" denotes a recording that did not chart or was not released in that territory.

Live albums

Title	Album details	Peak Polish chart positions
Live in Jazzgot	Date: 2002; Label: Cpt. Sparky Records; Formats: CD	—
Jazz Fajny Jest	Date: 15 February 2005; Label: Post_Post; Formats: CD	—
Alchemia	Date: 22 January 2008; Label: Universal Music Polska; Formats: CD	29
Punkfreud Army	Date: 2017; Label: Wydawnictwo Agora	—
"—" denotes a recording that did not chart or was not released in that territory.

== Awards ==
Year	Award	Result	Source
2011	MATEUSZ Award of the Polish Radio Channel 3	Nomination	
