= NTS Sessions 1–4 =

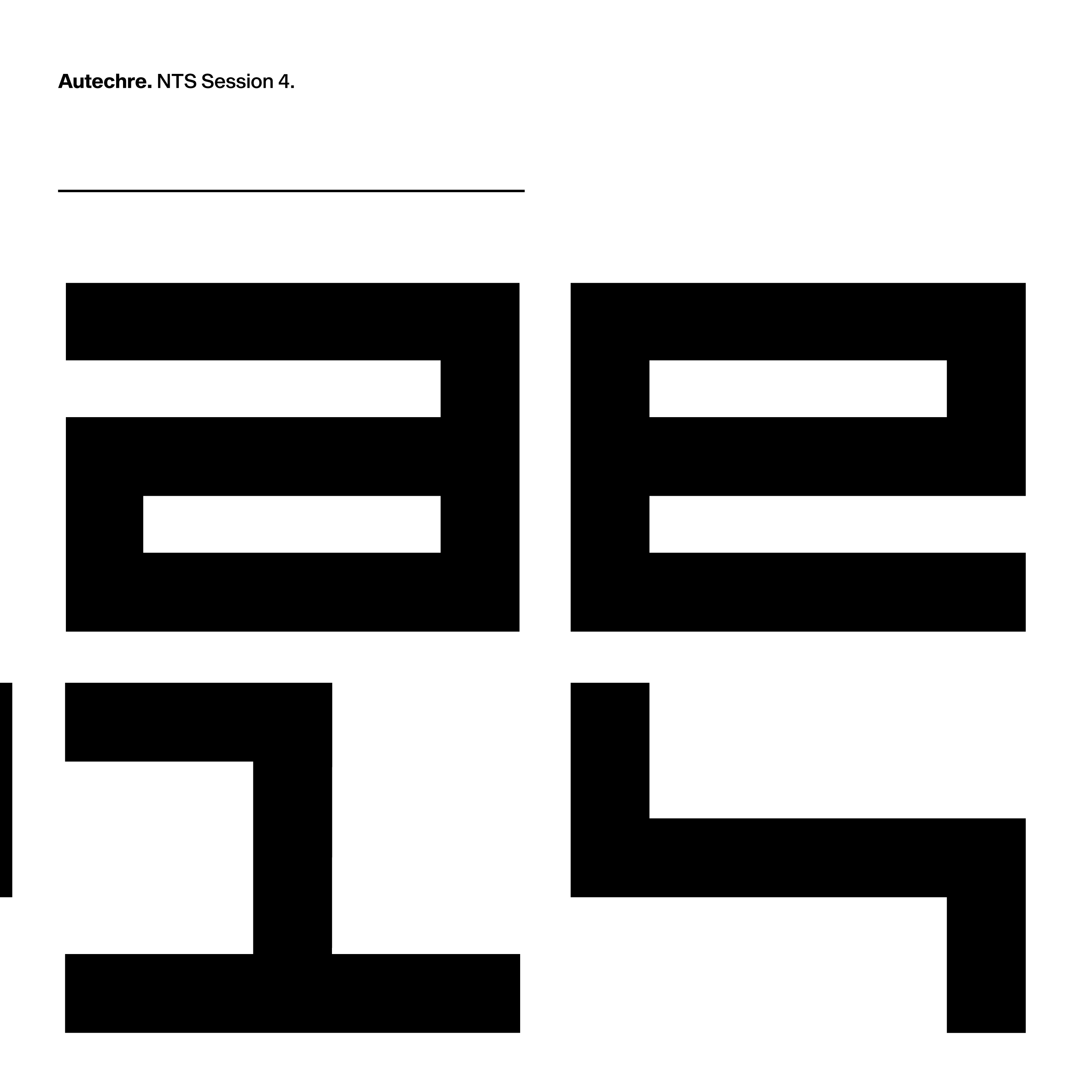

Studio album by Autechre
- Released: 26 April 2018 (Digital); August 2018 (CD/LP)
- Genre: Electronic
- Length: 480:00
- Label: Warp
- Producers: Rob Brown; Sean Booth

Autechre chronology
elseq 1–5 (2016)	NTS Sessions 1–4 (2018)	AE LIVE 2016/2018 (2020)

NTS Sessions 1–4 (also known as NTS Sessions) is the thirteenth studio album by British electronic music duo Autechre. It was released by Warp Records on 26 April 2018. The album was announced on 9 April, and consists of original music comprising Autechre's residency for NTS Radio on 3 April. The album was released digitally as well as 8×CD and 12×LP. Containing exactly eight hours of music, NTS Sessions 1–4 is the longest Autechre studio album. The album was met with critical acclaim.

== Background ==
In an August 2018 interview with Pitchfork, Sean Booth and Rob Brown stated that they were hesitant to do a residency when approached by NTS, having already produced a set for the station in 2016. However, it occurred to the duo that they had enough material to fill eight hours, and they ultimately conceived of the project as an extended radio show. Like other Autechre releases of the past decade, the music is a product of what the duo refers to as "the system": "a labyrinthine compendium of software synthesizers, virtual machines, and digital processes." When asked how far back the material goes, Booth explained:

I think the oldest thing is from 2011. But that was just an archive of the jam that became "bladelores", which is on Exai. Then there are a couple of things from in between that and elseq 1-5. The rest is weird recent jams using old patches. But it gets difficult, because the system itself is getting on a bit. It's about eight years old now. It gets a bit hazy in terms of what's a musical idea and what's a piece of technology.

In approaching the project as a radio show, "tracks were put together and edited with that in mind", with "versions and repeats of ideas that have occurred in earlier material." The duo "spent ages sequencing" the album's component parts with an emphasis on "deep mixing ... where you've got things you aren't necessarily aware of at first listen."

=== Announcement ===
On 3 April 2018, the duo officially announced a four-week residency on the online radio station NTS. Broadcasts occurred on the 5th, 12th, 19th and 26th of April at 4:00 PM GMT+1. Each session lasted for 2 hours. It was not made known that the residency would include new material until after the first session was broadcast, leading many to assume that it would be another of the band's extended DJ mixes.

== Release ==
A few days after the first session aired, Warp announced that each of the two-hour sessions would be released as a digital download immediately after broadcast. Physical 12×LP and 8×CD boxset versions of the entire album were also to be released, as well as 3×LP pressings of each individual session primarily through Bleep.

== Critical reception ==
Professional ratings
Review scores
Source	Rating
AllMusic	4.5/5 stars
Pitchfork	8.2/10
Resident Advisor	4.6/5
Sputnikmusic	4/5

NTS Sessions 1–4 has been met with critical acclaim. Mark Smith of Resident Advisor said that, although "NTS Sessions 1-4 will elicit the same critiques as any Autechre album in the last decade... it's their best record in many years", calling the album a "pinnacle, as if the preceding decades of work were acts of research leading to this point." Andrew Nosnitsky of Pitchfork said that the album "adds another level of the British duo's legacy. Though it's created by a computer, it will bring you to another plane of human existence if you let it."

Reviewing the album for AllMusic upon its physical release, Paul Simpson concluded that "By nature, the daunting NTS Sessions is Autechre's most challenging work, but for those who are dedicated, it's also one of their most rewarding."

NTS Sessions 1–4 was ranked the 8th best release of the year in The Wire magazine's annual critics' poll.

== Track listing ==
NTS Session 1 (WARP 364-1)
No.	Title	Length
1.	"t1a1"	18:40
2.	"bqbqbq"	11:16
3.	"debris_funk"	10:25
4.	"l3 ctrl"	16:52
5.	"carefree counter dronal"	5:14
6.	"north spiral"	15:01
7.	"gonk steady one"	22:25
8.	"four of seven"	13:06
9.	"32a_reflected"	7:02
Total length:		120:00

NTS Session 2 (WARP 364-2)
No.	Title	Length
1.	"elyc9 7hres"	10:21
2.	"six of eight (midst)"	8:42
3.	"xflood"	9:25
4.	"gonk tuf hi"	7:53
5.	"dummy casual pt2"	5:16
6.	"violvoic"	15:01
7.	"sinistrailAB air"	2:41
8.	"wetgelis casual interval"	2:39
9.	"e0"	15:45
10.	"peal MA"	5:04
11.	"9 chr0"	15:45
12.	"turbile epic casual, stpl idle"	21:30
Total length:		120:00

NTS Session 3 (WARP 364-3)
No.	Title	Length
1.	"clustro casual"	11:03
2.	"splesh"	8:56
3.	"tt1pd"	22:12
4.	"acid mwan idle"	11:57
5.	"fLh"	8:18
6.	"glos ceramic"	13:26
7.	"g 1 e 1"	7:00
8.	"nineFly"	10:04
9.	"shimripl air"	7:06
10.	"icari"	19:58
Total length:		120:00

NTS Session 4 (WARP 364-4)
No.	Title	Length
1.	"frane casual"	13:43
2.	"mirrage"	6:22
3.	"column thirteen"	17:02
4.	"shimripl casual"	24:32
5.	"all end"	58:22
Total length:		120:00

AE_Store and Bleep digital bonus track
No.	Title	Length
1.	"sinistrail sentinel"	11:41
Total length:		11:41

Notes

All versions of the album present the same material in the same order. However, due to the limitations of physical media, the album's CD and vinyl versions spread the material across multiple discs, or records:

- Digitally, there are no gaps between songs. Some songs do segue into the next one, eg. "shimripl casual" and "all end".
- On CD, each Session is split between two discs, with eight total discs averaging an hour in length each. As it is not physically possible for songs from one disc to segue into the next disc, track times vary slightly around the middle of each session, as each disc presents the complete first or last few seconds of some of the songs. "wetgelis casual interval" and "all end" are merely seconds longer as a result, while "shimripl casual" gains nearly a full minute of runtime due to its long crossfade into "all end" on the digital version.
- On vinyl, each Session is split into three LPs, with 12 total records averaging 20 minutes per side of vinyl. Again, as segueing between sides of vinyl is not physically possible on its own, many sides feature a few extra seconds of some songs, eg. "debris_funk"'s final note decaying on its own instead of doing so overtop "l3 ctrl". For Session 4, "shimripl casual" is divided between two sides of vinyl, with the first four minutes on the second side and the rest on the third side; and album finale "all end" is split across the fourth through sixth sides. These parts fade in and out at the starts and ends of each vinyl side, respectively, and therefore feature a slight repetition of audio during the fading portions.
- Bonus track "sinistrail sentinel" was also made available through Adult Swim Singles.

== Charts ==
Chart (2018)	Peak position
Belgian Albums (Ultratop Flanders)	176
