= AE LIVE =

AE_LIVE

Live album by Autechre
- Released: 29 October 2015
- Recorded: September 2014–October 2015
- Length: 28:35:27
- Label: Warp
- Producer: Autechre

Autechre chronology
L-event (2013)	AE_LIVE (2015)	elseq 1–5 (2016)

AE_LIVE is a series of live recordings by British electronic music duo Autechre, initially released on 29 October 2015 by Warp Records. As of 2019, it consists of 28 soundboard recordings, each roughly an hour long, made during their 2014–2015 live tour. Said tour had its inception at Warp Records' 25th anniversary Warp25 celebration in Kraków, Poland on 20 September 2014, the duo's first live show since 2011. The recordings are accompanied by individualized abstract geometric artwork produced by The Designers Republic.

== Release ==
AE_LIVE was first released abruptly to members of the Autechre mailing list, who were given an invite-only opportunity to purchase the recordings. On 1 November 2015, AE_STORE, Autechre's Bleep.com substore, released the first four live sets to the public. On 8 December 2015, the AE_STORE was updated to include five more recordings. On 30 January 2019, nineteen more shows from the North American tour were added.

According to the online music outlet Boomkat, the series reflects "the evolution of the duo’s live set" of this period, wherein "the differences between sets are at times subtle and at others not, but each of the releases gives a different glimpse into the way their tools are exploited and manipulated." In a 2016 interview, Autechre shared that the same system setup was used to create both the 2014-2015 live set and subsequent album elseq 1-5.

On 7 April 2020, a related second series was released as AE LIVE 2016/2018, consisting of a new live set performed from 2016 to 2018. Beginning in August 2023, a third series was released as AE_LIVE 2022– (later retitled AE_2022–), featuring new live sets from 2022 onward.

== Track listing ==
All tracks are written by Sean Booth and Rob Brown.

No.	Title	Length
1.	"AE_LIVE_KRAKOW_200914"	57:54
2.	"AE_LIVE_BRUSSELS_031014"	63:59
3.	"AE_LIVE_UTRECHT_221114"	60:44
4.	"AE_LIVE_DUBLIN_191214"	73:18
5.	"AE_LIVE_KREMS_020515"	54:27
6.	"AE_LIVE_NAGANO_300515"	56:50
7.	"AE_LIVE_GRAFENHAINICHEN_170715"	64:31
8.	"AE_LIVE_DOUR_180715"	64:25
9.	"AE_LIVE_KATOWICE_210815"	62:52
10.	"AE_LIVE_PORTLAND_240915"	60:25
11.	"AE_LIVE_SEATTLE_250915"	64:30
12.	"AE_LIVE_VANCOUVER_260915"	60:02
13.	"AE_LIVE_CHICAGO_290915"	63:46
14.	"AE_LIVE_TORONTO_011015"	60:02
15.	"AE_LIVE_MONTREAL_021015"	56:50
16.	"AE_LIVE_NEW_YORK_031015"	61:48
17.	"AE_LIVE_BOSTON_041015"	59:59
18.	"AE_LIVE_PORTSMOUTH_051015"	58:27
19.	"AE_LIVE_PHILADELPHIA_061015"	63:34
20.	"AE_LIVE_WASHINGTON_071015"	58:55
21.	"AE_LIVE_ASHEVILLE_081015"	55:03
22.	"AE_LIVE_ATLANTA_091015"	63:46
23.	"AE_LIVE_ORLANDO_101015"	59:38
24.	"AE_LIVE_MIAMI_111015"	60:46
25.	"AE_LIVE_AUSTIN_131015"	62:35
26.	"AE_LIVE_LOS_ANGELES_151015"	66:49
27.	"AE_LIVE_SAN_FRANCISCO_161015"	60:34
28.	"AE_LIVE_DENVER_171015"	58:55
Total length:		28:35:27
