= AE LIVE 2016/2018 =

AE_LIVE 2016/2018

Live album by Autechre
- Released: 7 April 2020
- Recorded: November 2016–July 2018
- Length: 477:49
- Label: Warp
- Producer: Autechre

Autechre chronology
NTS Sessions 1–4 (2018)	AE_LIVE 2016/2018 (2020)	Sign (2020)

AE_LIVE 2016/2018 (also known as onesix) is a series of live recordings by British electronic music duo Autechre, released on 7 April 2020 by Warp Records. It consists of 7 soundboard recordings made during their live tours in 2016 and 2018. The 2016 dates were recorded during Autechre's European "onesix" tour, and the 2018 dates were recorded during a short tour of Australia, Japan and Ireland. Autechre has said some dates from these tours were not recorded due to technical difficulties. Both tours feature variations of the same set.

Autechre has described the sound of the 2016/2018 set as "quite different" from the 2014/2015 set, saying that the newer set is "a little bit slower, and a little bit more focused on the sound than the beat ... a lot of the sequencing is still very complex, but it's a lot of curves rather than discrete events ... it's quite difficult to categorize ... we just think of it as Autechre." The set was intentionally designed so that it could be performed in both traditional music venues/clubs and seated concert halls. The Ireland date was held in Dublin's National Concert Hall. The recordings are accompanied by individualized artwork produced by The Designers Republic.

AE_LIVE 2016/2018 follows the previous series AE_LIVE, which features a different set performed during 2014 and 2015. Beginning in August 2023, a third series was released as AE_LIVE 2022– (later retitled AE_2022–), featuring new live sets from 2022 onward.

== Track listing ==
All tracks are written by Sean Booth and Rob Brown.

AE LIVE 2016/2018 track listing
No.	Title	Length
1.	"AE_LIVE_ZAGREB_061116"	66:36
2.	"AE_LIVE_TALLINN_131116"	64:46
3.	"AE_LIVE_HELSINKI_141116"	62:21
4.	"AE_LIVE_OSLO_171116"	65:19
5.	"AE_LIVE_NIJMEGEN_221116"	59:04
6.	"AE_LIVE_MELBOURNE_210618"	77:28
7.	"AE_LIVE_DUBLIN_150718"	82:15
Total length:		477:49
