= Peel Session 2 =

EP by Autechre
- Released: 11 December 2000
- Recorded: 9 August 1999
- Length: 29:30
- Label: Warp
- Producer: Autechre

Autechre chronology
Splitrmx12 (1999)	Peel Session 2 (2000)	Confield (2001)

Professional ratings
Review scores
Source	Rating
Allmusic	3/5 stars
Pitchfork Media	(6.9/10)

Peel Session 2 is the second John Peel session that Autechre recorded. The tracks were given to Peel in August 1999 and aired on 8 September 1999. The EP was released by Warp Records at the end of 2000.

The artwork for Peel Session 2, created by The Designers Republic, is matte white lettering on a glossy white background with a matte white border. In the top left corner of the booklet cover, Autechre is written in black. Below this in white lettering is the EP title, Peel Session 2.

All tracks were untitled when given to John Peel. Peel named the tracks live on air, with the exception of the final track title "19 Headaches", which Autechre suggested via email.

== Track listing ==
All tracks are written by Sean Booth and Rob Brown.

No.	Title	Length
1.	"Gelk"	8:51
2.	"Blifil"	7:00
3.	"Gaekwad"	6:25
4.	"19 Headaches"	7:14
Total length:		29:30
