= AE 2022– =

Series of live recordings by Autechre

AE_2022–

Live album by Autechre
- Released: 1-7; 10 August 2023; 8-19; 4 November 2024
- Recorded: July 2022 – May 2024
- Length: 1368:02
- Label: Warp
- Producer: Sean Booth, Rob Brown

Autechre chronology
Plus (2020)	AE_2022– (2023)

AE_2022– (initially known as AE_LIVE 2022–) is a collection of live recordings by British electronic music duo Autechre. The series was initially released on 10 August 2023 through Warp Records, and a batch of new recordings was subsequently added on 4 November 2024. Currently, the series consists of 19 soundboard recordings made during the band's live tours in 2022–2024. The recordings are accompanied by individualized artwork produced by The Designers Republic.

AE_2022– is Autechre's third official live series, following AE_LIVE (recorded 2014-2015) and AE_LIVE 2016/2018. Each series features a distinct set of new music.

== Background ==
The first batch of seven recordings was released on 10 August 2023 under the title AE_LIVE 2022–, consisting of shows recorded in Europe during 2022. The second batch of twelve recordings was released on 4 November 2024, now retitled AE_2022–, consisting of shows recorded in Australia and Europe during 2023 and in Europe during 2024.

In an interview with Metal, Rob Brown referred to the title as "2022 dash," indicating that the release was open-ended. In the same interview, both Brown and Sean Booth state that they're currently not interested in releasing albums, and will focus on releasing live sets online.

"I'm honestly not that interested in records anymore. The concept of what a studio album is seems outdated. For instance, if I create a track on my laptop while on a train, does that qualify as a studio album? No one would know it was made there. If I use my laptop on stage, does that still count as a studio record? It’s different because there’s an audience. But if I’m in the studio with friends while making a hip-hop album, is that an audience too? These terms become confusing."

— Sean Booth

In a November 2023 Mastodon thread, Booth shared that the AE_2022– material had become one long track the band continues adding onto, at that time being up to "about 4 hours long so far and growing steadily," and noting it was the "most interesting thing we’ve done in ages from our POV [point of view]." Various sections have been performed at live shows as the material continues to evolve. As well, fans have made continued efforts to categorize each unique set, with the segments being split into "A", "B", "C" and "D" sets.

== Track listing ==
All tracks are written by Sean Booth and Rob Brown.

AE_2022－ track listing (Note: tracks 1 - 7 originally included the prefix AE_LIVE, e.g. “AE_LIVE_MILAN_010722”.)
No.	Title	Length
1.	"AE_MILAN_010722"	66:56
2.	"AE_ATHENS_050722"	80:03
3.	"AE_HELSINKI_110922"	71:07
4.	"AE_LONDON_071022_A"	59:48
5.	"AE_LONDON_071022_B"	59:33
6.	"AE_BERGEN_021122"	67:59
7.	"AE_TURIN_041122"	60:45
8.	"AE_MELBOURNE_250823"	60:36
9.	"AE_SYDNEY_270823"	72:08
10.	"AE_VENICE_261023"	69:30
11.	"AE_DUBLIN_291023"	80:18
12.	"AE_BRUSSELS_040424"	75:15
13.	"AE_PARIS_060424"	87:08
14.	"AE_RENNES_070424"	65:26
15.	"AE_BARCELONA_090424"	79:11
16.	"AE_MADRID_100424"	86:27
17.	"AE_LISBON_120424_B"	62:42
18.	"AE_KREMS_270424"	75:40
19.	"AE_LYON_070524"	87:44
Total length:		22:48:02
