= Oversteps (album) =

Studio album by Autechre
- Released: 22 February 2010
- Recorded: 2008 – 2010
- Genres: Ambient; IDM; electronic
- Length: 71:24
- Label: Warp
- Producers: Rob Brown; Sean Booth

Autechre chronology
Quaristice (2008)	Oversteps (2010)	Move of Ten (2010)

Oversteps is the tenth studio album by British electronic music duo Autechre, released on Warp Records in 2010. The album was made available for official download on Bleep and the Japanese iTunes Store on 22 February 2010; the CD and deluxe vinyl editions were released on 22 March 2010.

Critics were generally positive about the album, with many considering it more focused and accessible than previous albums. Four months after its release, Oversteps was followed by a companion EP entitled Move of Ten.

== Background ==
In a March 2010 interview with Clash, Autechre members Sean Booth and Rob Brown said they did not know if any other music influenced the development of Oversteps; Booth commented that "I don’t own a single record that sounds like 'Oversteps'". The dynamic between the duo in the studio was called "hilariously accommodating" in the same interview, with Booth stating "I don’t mind backing down". According to a 2025 Q&A, when asked about the FM synths used on "Oversteps", Booth commented: "(Native Instruments) FM8, (Yamaha) FS1R, (u-he) Zebra all come to mind but more besides. the rig at the time was mainly using midi to control other gear. rob was using a few modular bits on it iirc".

== Artwork ==
The album artwork was created by The Designers Republic. In an interview with Warp Records, Ian Anderson of tDR explained that the album's artwork was based on a life-long influence of Anderson's, that of man versus machine. The cover is based on the idea that "[people are] trying to be as effective as machines and do the tasks that we’ve developed machines to do", and that a relatively simple task for a computer but an arduous one for a human is to draw a perfect circle. Anderson remarked that, in a March 2020 interview with Creative Boom editor Katy Cowan, while the duo described Oversteps as their "most unhuman album" to date, he thought that their material was more organic than their other work by comparison.

The artwork was created by staff at tDR who then attempted to create perfect circles by using a variety of materials and sizes. In all, seventy-two different circles were generated with paintbrushes and felt tip pens, making the covers of each format (CD, vinyl record, and in the case of digital, individual song artwork), print ad and merchandise a unique attempt at a perfectly drawn circle by a human. The concept was applied to concentric rings forming circles for Autechre's follow-up EP, Move of Ten.

== Release ==
Autechre streamed a twelve-hour webcast in early March 2010, coinciding with the album's release, as they had with the releases of Untilted and Quaristice.

Oversteps was released on 22 March 2010. Before its release, numerous fake versions of the album showed up on Internet websites, just as had happened with the previous three sets. Brown said it was "becoming a bit of a tradition" at the time of the album's release. Oversteps peaked at number 13 on the UK Official Charts Company's Independent Albums Chart. In the US, the album peaked at No. 15 and No. 46 on Billboard's Dance/Electronic Albums and Heatseekers Albums charts, respectively, the week of 10 April 2010.

A companion project to Oversteps, Move of Ten was released on 14 June 2010. While the project was long enough to be considered its own studio album, Brown and Booth classify it as an EP.

== Reception ==
Professional ratings
Aggregate scores
Source	Rating
AnyDecentMusic?	7.6/10
Metacritic	76/100
Review scores
Source	Rating
AllMusic	4/5 stars
Drowned in Sound	9/10
MusicOMH	3.5/5 stars
NME	8/10
Pitchfork	7.2/10
PopMatters	9/10
Q	3/5 stars
Resident Advisor	3.5/5
Tiny Mix Tapes	4/5 stars
Uncut	3/5 stars

Oversteps received generally positive reviews, with most agreeing it is one of the band's most accessible albums to date. Matt Kennedy of BBC was highly complimentary, and noted that while "Oversteps is certainly no exception to their outwardly difficult aesthetic.... Beneath the icy exterior, deceptively warm hearts beat". He added that, as per usual, the album was not immediately accessible, but that repeatedly listening to it is "the only method of absorbing Oversteps' depths", concluding, "Autechre continue to test themselves and listeners alike with stunningly intricate results."

Paul Clarke of Drowned in Sound agreed, saying Oversteps "initially still seems as imposing as an abandoned warehouse surrounded by nine feet of razor wire", but "does have entry points for the casual listener". He compared it to mid-1990s sets by fellow IDM group Future Sound of London, saying the album's songs "all seem to blossom out of each other to immerse the listener in a synaesthetic environment." He concluded his review on a similar note as Kennedy, saying, "Oversteps is still a challenging listen, and one which reveals endless layers of new detail with each spin. But it's also their most instantly rewarding—and arguably best—album to date."

Patrick Sisson of Pitchfork Media said the album recalled earlier works such as Amber, saying, "the ambience and atmospheres of Oversteps are haunting." He also called the album "less rigid" and "almost organic", concluding that Autechre were "still incorporating new designs, not merely repackaging the previous products."

== Track listing ==
All tracks are written by Sean Booth and Rob Brown.

No.	Title	Length
1.	"r ess"	5:13
2.	"ilanders"	5:32
3.	"known(1)"	4:43
4.	"pt2ph8"	4:10
5.	"qplay"	4:39
6.	"see on see"	4:37
7.	"Treale"	6:05
8.	"os veix3"	4:38
9.	"O=0"	4:53
10.	"d-sho qub"	6:26
11.	"st epreo"	4:08
12.	"redfall"	3:49
13.	"krYlon"	6:09
14.	"Yuop"	6:22
Total length:		71:24

Japanese bonus track
No.	Title	Length
15.	"Xektses sql"	3:01
Total length:		74:24
