= John Callaghan (musician) =

British musician, writer, and performance artist

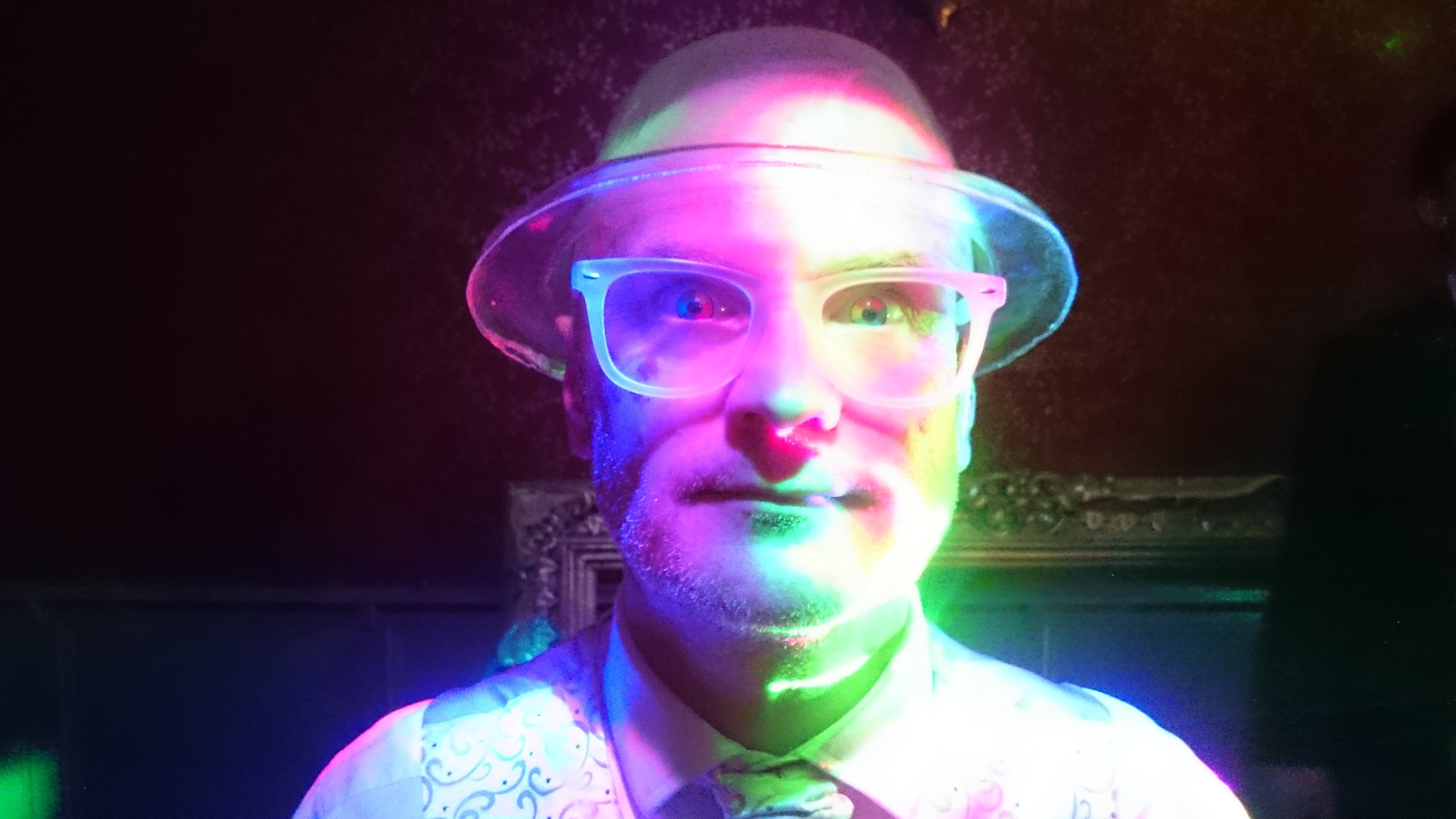
- John Callaghan in 2016

Background information
- Born: September 2, 1969 (age 56)
- Origin: Great Britain
- Genres: Electronic, EDM
- Years active: 1980s-present
- Labels: Warp, Antigen

John Callaghan (born 2 September 1969) is a British musician, writer, and performance artist.

== Career ==
His 1998 track "I'm Not Comfortable Inside My Mind" aired during MTV's Chill Out Zone in 1999, and was later featured in a Guardian round-up of songs about gender in October 2015. It was also featured on WarpVision, a 2004 compilation album released by Warp. The B-side, "Give Me Some Air", played on the John Peel show on BBC Radio 1.

Formerly with Warp, he is signed to independent music label Antigen Records. He is also part of the electronic act Eccentronic with Miss Hypnotique (Susi O'Neill), and has released a number of transport-themed songs including a song parodying the Edinburgh Trams.

He has worked as a producer and director for a number of musicians including Professor Elemental, Paul Vickers, Lee Ashcroft and Namtao. His 2010 single "Once More with Feeling" was released with a knitted cover.

He has contributed a number of Doctor Who-themed tracks to the Wife in Space podcast. He provided music for a limited edition EP 'The Raves of Androzani', including "The Ballad of The Raston Warrior Robot" which was played in a BBC Radio Tees feature.

He regularly performs live and is sometimes known for his "eccentric" and "frenetic energy". In 2009 he performed on the fourth plinth at Trafalgar Square as part of Antony Gormley's One & Other Project.

== Discography ==
=== Albums ===
- Newsreal (1990)
- Oddments (1991)
- Nesh (2001)
- Every Kiss Takes A Minute Off Your Life / Guidance (2004)
- Won't Lovers Revolt Now? (2005)
- Dance Music Extras (2005)
- It Might Never Happen (2005)
- John Callaghan's Cortical Charabanc (2019)
- Come On Bass, We've Got Work To Do (2020)
- If Every Day Were Like This One (2020)
- John Callaghan's Cortical Charabanc Vol 2 (2021)
- Thought Soup (2025)
- John Callaghan's Cortical Charabanc Vol 3 (2026)
