= Gantz Graf =

EP by Autechre
- Released: 5 August 2002
- Genre: IDM, glitch
- Length: 19:17
- Label: Warp
- Producer: Autechre

Autechre chronology
| Confield (2001) | Gantz Graf (2002) | Draft 7.30 (2003) |

Professional ratings
Review scores
| Source | Rating |
|---|---|
| Allmusic | 3/5 stars |
| Drowned in Sound | 9 |
| Pitchfork Media | 7.0/10 |

Gantz Graf is a three-track EP released by Autechre in 2002 on CD and 12". A special DVD release was made available featuring the "Gantz Graf" video created by Alex Rutterford, as well as the videos for "Basscadet" (directed by Jess Scott Hunter and edited by D.A. Slade) and "Second Bad Vilbel" (directed by Chris Cunningham, and an updated version from the original), and a slide show of stills from the "Gantz Graf" video.

== Video ==
The video for Gantz Graf features an abstract object (or an agglomeration of objects) synchronized to the music as it morphs, pulsates, shakes, and finally dissolves. Rutterford (who had previously created an unofficial video for the Tri Repetae track "Eutow" as part of the Channel 4 music programme Lo-Fi in 2001) claims the idea for the "Gantz Graf" video came during one of his LSD trips. Rutterford also stated that there was no generative element to the imagery; every three-dimensional object in the agglomeration was painstakingly and manually synchronised with a specific element or frequency range within the track. The video was produced by Lost in Space.

== Track listing ==
Gantz Graf CD/12"
| No. | Title | Length |
|---|---|---|
| 1. | "Gantz Graf" | 3:58 |
| 2. | "Dial." | 6:17 |
| 3. | "Cap.IV" | 9:02 |
| Total length: | | 19:17 |

DVD

Gantz Graf DVD
| No. | Title | Length |
|---|---|---|
| 1. | "Gantz Graf" | 3:58 |
| 2. | "Basscadet" (Bcdtmx) | 6:52 |
| 3. | "Second Bad Vilbel" (Re-edit) | 4:13 |
| Total length: | | 15:03 |
