= Confield =

Studio album by Autechre
- Released: 30 April 2001
- Genres: IDM; experimental; electronic; electronica; abstract
- Length: 62:00 (Standard); 73:02 (Japanese Edition)
- Label: Warp
- Producers: Rob Brown; Sean Booth

Autechre chronology
Peel Session 2 (2000)	Confield (2001)	Gantz Graf (2002)

Confield is the sixth studio album by British electronic music duo Autechre. It was released on 30 April 2001, through Warp Records on 2xLP, CD and digital services. The album marked a significant shift in sound for the duo, moving towards abstract and experimental tracks instead of the previous warm, ambient sounds of Amber and Tri Repetae. Confield was the first Autechre studio album to utilise generative programs such as Max. The album received general acclaim; critics enjoyed its experimental nature, though some thought it was overly robotic and unapproachable.

== Production ==
With Confield, the duo largely abandoned the ambient and melodic styles of their earlier works such as Amber and Tri Repetae in favour of more chaotic and abstract sound palettes. As their style grew more experimental, Confield and their later albums included the use of software like Max to form the basis of songs rather than physical synthesisers. According to Booth, most tracks from Confield originated from experiments with this software that would not fit in with a club environment. It was released on 30 April 2001, through Warp as a CD, 2xLP and digital file.

Confield and later releases by the duo such as Exai made use of generative sequences done through Max. Brown and Booth later noted the use of something called "the system" while making their music; a large network of synthesisers and other digital processes. The duo have also stated in interviews that the music created by this system is not entirely random, and still requires human control to guide and change tracks.

== Composition ==
"Pen Expers"
The third track from Confield. "Pen Expers" has been likened to a drill 'n' bass track with hard percussion and high-pitched melodies.

Confield has been described as IDM, experimental, electronic, electronica, and abstract. In a review for Pitchfork, Malcolm Seymour III described how abstract the album was in comparison to the duo's previous projects. Seymour III also stated how Confield was a lot less accessible to newer listeners compared to Autechre's previous projects. Mike Barnes of The Independent called the music harsh but beautiful, noting its repetitive beats and its complex rhythms throughout. In a retrospective review of Tri Repetae for The Quietus, Gary Suarez noted how the album treated melodies like "bitter foes", with sounds being timestretched and manipulated. Louise Bradbury of OffBeat noted how melodies "took secondseat" with Confield, with sweeping percussive elements being the main focus of the album.

Tony Naylor of NME called "Sim Gishel" a track with atmospheric, stifled melodies and disjointed beats. "Eidetic Casin" was also noted for its "iridescent chimes". Pascal Wyse of The Guardian commented on the "strange sampled snoring" of "Uviol" and the melodies resembling voices on "Lentic Cathachresis". In a review for AllMusic, John Bush described "Cfern" as a track that "keeps listeners guessing" with conflicting rhythms and confusing beats. Bush also said the opener "VI Scose Poise" contained "bouncing-ball-in-a-ring-modulator production" along with melodies in the minor key. Seymour III compared "Pen Expers" to drill 'n' bass with "vacuum-navigated" percussion. "Parhelic Triangle" contains a brooding baseline and a variety of chimes; Seymour III compared the track to "Acroyear2" from LP5. In Sounding Art, Katharine Norman stated "Bine" contained warped drum machines and disordered sounds. Norman compared the track to a "machine gone mad".

== Reception ==
Professional ratings
Aggregate scores
Source	Rating
Metacritic	82/100
Review scores
Source	Rating
AllMusic	3/5 stars
Alternative Press	4/5
Blender	3/5 stars
The Guardian	3/5 stars
Muzik	2/5
NME	8/10
Pitchfork	8.8/10
The Rolling Stone Album Guide	3/5 stars
Spin	7/10
URB	3/5 stars

Confield received mixed acclaim from critics. At Metacritic, which aggregates scores from mainstream critics and assigns a weighted average, Confield has an average score of 82 based on 10 reviews, indicating "critical acclaim". In 2025, Resident Advisor listed "Cfern" as the 94th best electronic track from 2000–2025.

Reviewing the album for Pitchfork, Malcolm Seymour III gave the album an 8.8 out of 10, concluding that Autechre fans would feel alienated by the release. However, Seymour III also noted the high production value of the album and that it was "thought-provoking". Tony Naylor of NME gave Confield an 8 out of 10, stating the release was not "emotionally detached" and calling it both "biologically warm" and imaginative. Spin's Eric Weisbard gave the album a 7 out of 10, concluding that the album was a variety of six minute tracks that set texture-beats against drone-shimmers. Confield was covered in a 2001 issue of Billboard, stating that the duo's music would likely be picked apart, as well as calling them influential. It was also noted that the audience should instead "sit back and let [the album] wash over [them]". In a review for Blender, Douglas Wolk described how the duo had moved away from traditional compositions to fractured beats that "detonate in flurries". Wolk also noted how Autechre "[pushed] the outer limits of their craft" with Confield. Louise Bradbury of OffBeat gave a positive review, calling the album "breathtaking".

Some critics gave mixed reviews. Ben Sisario gave Confield three stars in The Rolling Stone Album Guide. Sisario mentioned the "crunching, robotic rhythms" and "clean, spacey melodies" of Confield and Draft 7.30, but also noted how newer Autechre releases maintained a sense of "mind-numbing sameness". John Bush of AllMusic gave the album three stars and commented that the album contained signs of the duo's earlier work. However, he also noted its experimental nature and said it was an album that should be respected instead of enjoyed. Pascal Wyse of The Guardian gave the album three stars, concluding that the release was overly robotic and comparing it to information overload. Mark Jenkins of The Washington Post compared the sounds on Confield to the sound of a skipping CD player. Jenkins also noted the stylistic change from "smooth and pulsing" tracks on the duo's previous works to "ragged and fidgety" tracks within the album. For Muzik, Thomas Green gave Confield a 2/5, likening its sounds to manipulated metal filaments within a dustbin. While Green stated their diehard fans would still enjoy the album, he also said the duo simply "didn't surprise any more".

== Track listing ==
No.	Title	Length
1.	"VI Scose Poise"	6:57
2.	"Cfern"	6:41
3.	"Pen Expers"	7:08
4.	"Sim Gishel"	7:14
5.	"Parhelic Triangle"	6:03
6.	"Bine"	4:41
7.	"Eidetic Casein"	6:12
8.	"Uviol"	8:35
9.	"Lentic Catachresis"	8:29
Total length:		62:00

Japanese bonus track
No.	Title	Length
10.	"MCR Quarter" (Recorded live at Band On The Wall, Manchester 1998)	11:02
Total length:		73:02
