= Absolute music =

Music that is non-representational

Absolute music (sometimes abstract music) is music that is not explicitly "about" anything; in contrast to program music, it is non-representational. The idea of absolute music developed at the end of the 18th century in the writings of authors of early German Romanticism, such as Wilhelm Heinrich Wackenroder, Ludwig Tieck and E. T. A. Hoffmann, but the term was not coined until 1846 when it was first used by Richard Wagner in a programme to Beethoven's Ninth Symphony.

The aesthetic ideas underlying absolute music derive from debates over the relative value of what was known in the early years of aesthetic theory as the fine arts. Kant, in his Critique of Judgment, dismissed music as "more a matter of enjoyment than culture" and "less worth in the judgement of reason than any other of the fine arts" because of its lack of conceptual content, thus treating as a deficit the very feature of music that others celebrated. Johann Gottfried Herder, in contrast, regarded music as the highest of the arts because of its spirituality, which he attributed to the invisibility of sound. The ensuing arguments among musicians, composers, music historians and critics continue today.

== Romantic debate ==
A group of Romantics consisting of Johann Gottfried Herder, Johann Wolfgang Goethe, Jean Paul Richter and E.T.A. Hoffmann gave rise to the idea of what can be labeled as "spiritual absolutism". In this respect, instrumental music transcends other arts and languages to become the discourse of a 'higher realm', an idea expressed in Hoffmann's review of Beethoven's 5th Symphony, published in 1813. These thinkers believed that music could be more emotionally powerful and stimulating without words. According to Richter, music would eventually 'outlast' the word.

== Formalist debate ==
Formalism is the concept of music for music's sake, or that music's 'meaning' is entirely in its form. In this respect, music has no extra-musical meaning at all and is enjoyed by appreciation of its formal structure and technical construction. The 19th century music critic Eduard Hanslick argued that music could be enjoyed as pure sound and form, and that it needed no connotation of extra-musical elements to warrant its existence. He argued that in fact, these extra-musical ideas and images detracted from the beauty of the music.

Music has no subject beyond the combinations of notes we hear, for music speaks not only by means of sounds, it speaks nothing but sound.

— Eduard Hanslick

Formalism therefore rejected genres such as opera, song and tone poems as they conveyed explicit meanings or programmatic imagery. Symphonic forms were considered more aesthetically pure. (The choral finale of Beethoven's Ninth Symphony, as well as the programmatic Sixth Symphony, became problematic to formalist critics who had championed the composer as a pioneer of the Absolute, especially with the late Beethoven string quartets). Carl Dahlhaus described absolute music as music without a "concept, object, and purpose".

=== Opposition and objections to absolute music ===
Richard Wagner ironically was a vocal opponent of absolute music, a phrase he coined. Wagner considered the choral finale of Beethoven's Ninth Symphony to be the proof that music works better with words, famously saying: "Where music can go no further, there comes the word ... the word stands higher than the tone." Wagner also called Beethoven's Ninth Symphony the death knell of the symphony, for he was far more interested in combining all forms of art with his Gesamtkunstwerk.

== Contemporary views ==
Today, the debate continues over whether music has, or ought to have, extramusical meaning or not. However, most contemporary views, reflecting ideas emerging from views of subjectivity in linguistic meaning arising in cognitive linguistics, as well as Kuhn's work on cultural biases in science and other ideas on meaning and aesthetics (e.g. Wittgenstein on cultural constructions in thought and language), appear to be moving towards a consensus that music provides at least some signification or meaning, in terms of which it is understood.

The cultural bases of musical understanding have been highlighted in Philip Bohlman's work, who considers music as a form of cultural communication:

There are those who believe that music represents nothing other than itself. I argue that we are constantly giving it new and different abilities to represent who we are.

Bohlman has gone on to argue that the use of music, e.g. among the Jewish diaspora, was in fact a form of identity building.

Susan McClary has criticised the notion of 'absolute music', arguing that all music, whether explicitly programmatic or not, contains implicit programs that reflect the tastes, politics, aesthetic philosophies and social attitudes of the composer and their historical situation. Such scholars would argue that classical music is rarely about nothing, but reflects aesthetic tastes that are themselves influenced by culture, politics and philosophy. Composers are often bound up in a web of tradition and influence, in which they strive to consciously situate themselves in relation to other composers and styles. Lawrence Kramer, on the other hand, believes music has no means to reserve a "specific layer or pocket for meaning. Once it has been brought into sustainable connection with a structure of prejudgment, music simply becomes meaningful."

Music which appears to demand an interpretation, but is abstract enough to warrant objectivity (e.g. Tchaikovsky's 6th Symphony), is what Lydia Goehr refers to as "double-sided autonomy". This happens when the formalist properties of music became attractive to composers because, having no meaning to speak of, music could be used to envision an alternative cultural and/or political order, while escaping the scrutiny of the censor.

=== Linguistic meaning ===
On the topic of musical meaning, Wittgenstein, at several points in his late diary Culture and Value, ascribes meaning to music, for instance, that in the finale, a conclusion is being drawn, e.g.:

[One] can point to particular places in a tune by Schubert and say: look, that is the point of the tune, this is where the thought comes to a head.

Jerrold Levinson has drawn extensively on Wittgenstein to comment:

Intelligible music stands to literal thinking in precisely the same relation as does intelligible verbal discourse. If that relation be not exemplification but instead, say, expression, then music and language are, at any rate, in the same, and quite comfortable, boat.

== See also ==
- Abstract art § Music
- Art music
- Gebrauchsmusik
- Impressionist music
- Musique concrète ("Concrete music")
