= LP5 =

Studio album by Autechre
- Released: 13 July 1998
- Genres: IDM; experimental; ambient
- Length: 76:16
- Label: Warp
- Producer: Autechre

Autechre chronology
Cichlisuite (1997)	LP5 (1998)	Peel Session (1999)

LP5 is the fifth studio album by English electronic music duo Autechre. It was released on 13 July 1998 on Warp. No title was printed anywhere within the artwork, so it became known as LP5; it has also been called Autechre, as well as Album, as listed on promotional copies.

With the album, Autechre began abandoning the warm sounds of earlier albums like Amber in favor of a fine-tuned, technical style they had begun exploring on Chiastic Slide and the Cichlisuite EP, while also incorporating influences from electroacoustic music.

== Production ==
The track "Drane2" is a response to Aphex Twin's "Bucephalus Bouncing Ball", which, according to Sean Booth, is an answer to Autechre's earlier track "Drane":

"yeah we did the track drane, which had that exponential speeding-up delay thing happening, and then rich did that bouncing ball track, and we answered it with drane2 which was the same delay trick but feeding percussion into it instead, as a kind of tease"

Several technical facts about the album's production are known from an AMA conducted in 2013 on the electronic music site "We Are The Music Makers": synths used on the album include the Nord Lead 1, Yamaha DX100, and Ensoniq ASR-10; the first half of "Vose In" was made using the Nord Lead's drum maps and its ending was programmed in SoundEdit 16; finally, the complex rhythms of "Under BOAC" were programmed in Logic Pro rather than in Max.

== Critical reception ==
Professional ratings
Review scores
Source	Rating
AllMusic	4.5/5 stars
The Encyclopedia of Popular Music	4/5 stars
Pitchfork	8.4/10
The Rolling Stone Album Guide	3/5 stars

LP5 received mostly positive reviews from professional critics. Greg Prato of AllMusic gave the album 4.5 out of 5 stars and called it "uncompromisingly cutting-edge," saying that it "should be admired, since it's not comparable to anything past or present." Noting the rapid pace of music technological development, Ryan Schreiber of Pitchfork said that this was the correct "time for Autechre to update their sound. And they've done it well."

== Legacy ==
Pitchfork listed LP5 at number eight on its 2017 list of "The 50 Best IDM Albums of All Time", one of three Autechre albums to be included; reviewer Mark Richardson stated that the album effectively balances the accessibility of their earlier work with the more challenging material to come, and thus represents "a certain peak." Also in 2017, Treblezine named LP5 the 24th best electronic album of the 1990s, and in 2023 named it one of the four best Autechre albums.

== Track listing ==
All tracks are written by Sean Booth and Rob Brown.

No.	Title	Length
1.	"Acroyear2"	8:39
2.	"777"	5:49
3.	"Rae"	7:13
4.	"Melve"	1:14
5.	"Vose In"	5:21
6.	"Fold4, Wrap5"	3:58
7.	"Under BOAC"	6:22
8.	"Corc"	5:50
9.	"Caliper Remote"	1:40
10.	"Arch Carrier"	6:49
11.	"Drane2" (9:38) (Untitled hidden track starts at 21:42)	23:21
Total length:		76:16

On US pressings, the hidden track is moved to its own 12th track, and the silence after "Drane2" is shortened by three minutes. The hidden track is not found on vinyl pressings. Additionally, some digital releases of the album rename "Acroyear2" to "AcroyearII".

== Charts ==
Chart (1998)	Peak position
UK Albums (Official Charts)	135
UK Independent Albums (Official Charts)	17
