= Boards of Canada discography =

- Studio albums: 5
- Extended plays: 5
- Live albums: 1
- Singles: 5
- Limited-only and unreleased albums: 9

The discography of Scottish electronic music duo Boards of Canada consists of five studio albums, five extended plays (EP), one live album, five singles and nine limited or unreleased albums. They debuted with EP Twoism, released in August 1995 through their Music70 label.

== Albums ==
=== Studio albums ===
List of studio albums, with selected chart positions and certifications
Album	Details	Peak chart positions										Certifications
Album	Details	UK	AUS	BEL (Fl)	FRA	GER	IRE	NED	NOR	SWE	US	Certifications
Music Has the Right to Children	Released: 20 April 1998; Label: Warp, Skam, Matador; Format: CD, vinyl	193	―	―	―	―	―	―	―	―	―	BPI: Gold
Geogaddi	Released: 13 February 2002; Label: Warp; Format: CD, vinyl, digital download	21	―	―	78	―	28	―	―	―	― (Note: "Geogaddi" did not enter the Billboard 200 Chart, but peaked at no. 19 on the Billboard Heatseekers Albums Chart.)	BPI: Silver
The Campfire Headphase	Released: 17 October 2005; Label: Warp; Format: CD, vinyl, digital download	41	―	71	86	―	55	83 (Note: The Campfire Headphase made the Alternative Top 30 for 2005.)	40	―	― (Note: The Campfire Headphase did not enter the Billboard 200 Chart, but peaked at no. 5 on the Billboard Heatseekers Albums Chart.)	
Tomorrow's Harvest	Released: 5 June 2013; Label: Warp; Format: CD, vinyl, digital download	7	24	7	130	52	7	19	9	32	13	
Inferno	Released: 29 May 2026; Label: Warp; Format: CD, vinyl, digital download	3	3	4	35	4	7	6	-	30	29	
"—" denotes a release that did not chart.

=== Live albums ===
- Peel Session (BBC Radio 1) – 1999 – 12" (Warp, WAP114) and CD (Warp, WAP114CD)

=== Compilations ===
In 1996, Boards of Canada released three compilations via their self-distributing label Music70. Recordings of these compilations leaked online in the early 2000s. Boc Maxima features several songs that would go on to later be featured on commercial releases, including Twoism, Hi Scores, Aquarius and Music Has The Right To Children. Aside from "I Love U" from A Few Old Tunes, which was later reworked as "The Color Of The Fire" on Music Has The Right To Children, the material on the two Old Tunes compilations has never been released commercially.

- A Few Old Tunes (1996, cassette)
- Old Tunes Vol. 2 (1996, cassette)
- Boc Maxima (1996, cassette, CD)

An untitled cassette compilation, colloquially referred to as the Random 35 Tracks Tape, leaked online in 2004. All tracks are untitled, and the origins of the tape are unknown, although it is generally accepted that the material was recorded by Boards of Canada.

=== Lost releases ===
Before they came to the attention of wider audiences, Boards of Canada released several recordings in very limited numbers, distributed only to friends and family. Though their existence and tracklists have been confirmed by the band through their website, they have never been made public and have been sought after by fans and collectors.

Album	Details
Catalog 3	Release date (cassette): summer 1987; Re-release date (CD): 1997; Label: Music70 (CANC19)
Acid Memories	Release date (cassette): 1989; Label: Music70 (CANC27)
Closes Vol. 1	Release date (cassette, 100 units): 1992; Re-release date (CD, 30 units): 1997; Label: Music70 (AOMC16, AOCD16)
Play by Numbers	Release date (CD and cassette, 100 units): 1994; Label: Music70 (AOCD43, AOMC43)
Hooper Bay	Release date (12", 200 units): 1994; Label: Music70 (THS012)

== EPs ==
EP	Details	Peak chart positions			
EP	Details	UK Phys.	UK Dance	UK Indie	US Dance
Twoism	Released: August 1995; Label: Music70; Format: CD, vinyl; Reissued by Warp in 2002	―	20 (Note: Charted in 2026)	―	16 (Note: Charted in 2002)
Hi Scores	Released: December 1996; Label: Skam; Format: CD, vinyl	―	34	―	―
Aquarius	Released 5 January 1998; Label: Skam (KMAS001); 500 units; Limited 7", 33 ⅓ RPM	2	―	―	―
In a Beautiful Place Out in the Country	Released: 27 November 2000; Label: Warp; Format: CD, vinyl, digital download	9 (Note: Credited under "Kid for Today")	31 (Note: Charted in 2026)	15	―
Trans Canada Highway	Released: 29 May 2006; Label: Warp; Format: CD, vinyl, digital download	―	8	4	12
"—" denotes a release that did not chart.

== Singles ==
Title	Year	Format	Album
"Telephasic Workshop" / "Roygbiv"	1998	Promotional 12"	Music Has the Right to Children
"------ / ------ / ------ / XXXXXX / ------ / ------"	2013	12"	Non-album single
"Reach for the Dead"	2013	Digital download	Tomorrow's Harvest
"Deep Time"	2026	Promotional video	Inferno
"Introit" / "Prophecy at 1420 MHz"	2026	Digital download	Inferno

== Other charted songs ==
Title	Year	Peak chart positions	Album
Title	Year	NZ Hot	Album
"Hydrogen Helium Lithium Leviathan"	2026	35	Inferno
"Age of Capricorn"	2026	39	Inferno
"Father and Son"	2026	38	Inferno
"Naraka"	2026	32	Inferno

== Compilation appearances ==
The following compilations feature tracks by Boards of Canada.

Year	Song	Album	Notes
1996	"Korona"	MASK 100	"Korona" is previously unreleased; 100 units
1997	"Trapped"	MASK 200	As Hell Interface; 200 units
1997	"Soylent Night"	Whine and Missingtoe	As Hell Interface; "Soylent Night" is previously unreleased; 500 units
1997	"Turquoise Hexagon Sun"	Bento Box	
1997	"Hi Scores" "Everything You Do Is a Balloon"	Skampler	
1998	"Orange Romeda"	We Are Reasonable People	"Orange Romeda" is previously unreleased
1998	"Aquarius"	03:00am Eternal	
1998	"Aquarius"	Smokedown:2 Further Travels Into The Leftfield	
1999	"Kid for Today" "An Eagle in Your Mind"	Warp 10+3: The Remixes	
1999	"Happy Cycling"	DJ-Kicks: Kid Loco	
1999	"Roygbiv"	Everything Is Nice: Matador Records 10th Anniversary Anthology	
2000	"An Eagle in Your Mind"	Intended Play: Spring/Summer 2000	
2000	"Happy Cycling"	Lead with the Bass Club, Vol. 2	
2001	"In a Beautiful Place Out in the Country"	All Tomorrow's Parties 1.0: Tortoise Curated	
2001	"Aquarius"	Cool and Deadly	
2001	"In a Beautiful Place Out in the Country"	Kristna Beats	
2001	"In a Beautiful Place Out in the Country"	MTV Extreme	
2001	"In a Beautiful Place Out in the Country"	Meltdown by Ross Allen	
2001	"The Color of the Fire"	Now, Listen! by DJ Food	
2001	"Everything You Do Is a Balloon"	Rough Trade Shops: 25 Years	
2001	"Poppy Seed"	So Soon by Slag Boom Van Loon	"Poppy Seed" appears twice on the album, the second time as "Poppy Seed (Reprise)"
2001	"Roygbiv"	Sweet Electro: It Sounds Different, Vol. 2	
2001	"Rue the Whirl"	The Chillout Lounge	
2001	"In a Beautiful Place Out in the Country"	Warp: Routine	
2002	"Roygbiv"	Angel Beach, Vol. 1	
2002	"Kid for Today"	Chilled Ibiza, Vol. 3	
2002	"Amo Bishop Roden"	Collection, Vol. 1	
2002	"Roygbiv"	Karma Lounge, Vol. 2	
2002	"Alpha and Omega"	Nova Tunes, Vol. 6	
2002	"Aquarius"	Solar Spectrums by Chris Coco	
2002	"Julie and Candy"	Ultra Chilled, Vol. 2	
2002	"Roygbiv"	The Chillout Session	
2002	"Just a Beautiful Place in the Country"	Sunset Buddha Lounge	
2002	"Happy Cycling"	Disco Pogo for Punks in Pumps vol. 2	
2003	"Music Is Math"	Diamonds La Roca	
2003	"Happy Cycling"	Global Underground: Reykjavik by Nick Warren	
2003	"The Story of Xentrix"	Warp WIFOF2003 Mix	As Hell Interface; "The Story of Xentrix" is previously unreleased
2003	"Aquarius"	Listen & Learn by Hexstatic	
2003	"Kid for Today"	Tune in: Chill Out	
2004	"Open the Light"	Chiller Cabinet	
2004	"Roygbiv"	Fabriclive.17 by Aim	
2005	"Aquarius"	Chilled Beats Sessions	
2005	"Sixtyniner"	In Bed with Nova: Premiere Nuit	
2005	"9 June" "Amo Bishop Roden"	160 Minutes Of by Marco Bailey	
2005	"Amo Bishop Roden"	Afterhours: Global Underground	
2005	"Zoetrope"	Back to Mine: Adam Freeland	
2005	"Amo Bishop Roden"	Afterhours II	
2006	"Roygbiv"	Trip-Hop Anthology	
2006	"Dayvan Cowboy"	Tom Middleton Presents The Trip II	
2006	"Oscar See Through Red Eye"	The Big Chill	
2006	"Oscar See Through Red Eye"	Sinners Lounge: The Erotic Sessions	
2006	"Constants Are Changing"	Rough Trade Shops: Counter Culture 05	
2006	"Zoetrope"	Magic Summer, Vol. 2	
2006	"Satellite Anthem Icarus"	Essential Lounge, Vol. 2	
2006	"Dayvan Cowboy"	Chillout Session 2006	
2006	"Dayvan Cowboy" "Everything You Do Is a Balloon" "Skyliner"	Balance010 by Jimmy Van M	
2007	"Dayvan Cowboy"	Zen Electro	
2007	"Nlogax"	Cosmo Galactic Prism by Prins Thomas	
2007	"Left Side Drive"	City Lounge, Vol. 3: Paris/Berlin/London/New York	
2008	"Zoetrope"	Si-Fi-Lo-Fi, Vol. 2 by Damian Lazarus	
2008	"DC (Bit)" "Dayvan Cowboy [Remix]"	Pretty Swell Explode by Odd Nosdam	
2009	"Seven Forty Seven" "Dayvan Cowboy" "Open The Light" "Telephasic Workshop" "An Eagle In Your Mind" "Spiro" "Melissa Juice" "Roygbiv" "Amo Bishop Roden" "In a Beautiful Place Out in the Country [Mira Calix/Oliver Coates Remix]" "Kaini Industries [Bibio Remix]"	Warp20	"Seven Forty Seven" and "Spiro" are previously unreleased.; "Seven Forty Seven" appears on Warp20 (Unheard).; "Dayvan Cowboy", "Open The Light", "Telephasic Workshop", "An Eagle In Your Mind" and "Spiro" appear in 1.8 second fragments on Warp20 (Infinite), a vinyl exclusive composed entirely of locked grooves.; "Melissa Juice" and "Roygbiv" appear in part on Warp20 (Elemental), a mashup album sampling the discography of Warp Records.; "Roygbiv" and "Amo Bishop Roden" appear on Warp20 (Chosen).; "In a Beautiful Place Out in the Country [Mira Calix/Oliver Coates Remix]" and "Kaini Industries [Bibio Remix]" appear on Warp20 (Recreated).
2009	"Amo Bishop Roden"	Renaissance: The Masters Series by James Zabiela	
2009	"Dayvan Cowboy"	100 Hits: Chilled	
2010	"Dawn Chorus"	Trip-Hop Classics by Kid Loco	
2010	"Telephasic Workshop"	Matador at 21	
2010	"Kid for Today"	Cool	
2014	"Reach for the Dead"	Late Night Tales: Franz Ferdinand	
2014	"Cold Earth"	Coming Home by Sven Väth	
2014	"Aquarius [Version 3]"	Balance 026: Mixed by Hernan Cattaneo	
2014	"Reach for the Dead"	Café del Mar, Vol. 20	
2015	"Roygbiv"	Clubbed to Death	
2015	"In a Beautiful Place Out in the Country"	Late Night Tales: Nils Frahm	
2017	"Zoetrope"	Behind the Counter with Max Richter	
2017	"Olson"	Late Night Tales: BadBadNotGood	
2017	"Orange Romeda"	DJ-Kicks: Lone	
2019	"Roygbiv"	Trip Hop Vibes Vol. 1	
2022	"Olsen"	To Rococo Rot Influences	

== Soundtrack appearances ==
Year	Song	Soundtrack
1999	"Telephasic Workshop"	The Trip
2003	"Everything You Do Is a Balloon"	Morvern Callar [Original Soundtrack]
2004	"Gyroscope"	The Consequences of Love (Le conseguenze dell'amore)
2012	"Gyroscope"	Sinister & Sinister 2
2018	"Ready Lets Go"	Baby Driver, Vol. 2: The Score for a Score
2026	"The Word Becomes Flesh"	Backrooms

== Remixes ==
Boards of Canada have remixed and been remixed by a number of artists.

- "Surfaise (The Trade Winds Mix)" – 1997 – remix of Michael Fakesch on Demon 1
- "Trapped (Hell Interface Remix)" – 1998 – remix of Colonel Abrams on Trapped (as Hell Interface)
- "Dirty Great Mable" – 1998 – remix of Bubbah's Tum on Dirty Great Mable (Remixes)
- "Prime Audio Soup (Vegetarian Soup Remix)" – 1998 – remix of Meat Beat Manifesto on Prime Audio Soup
- "Sandsings" – 1998 – remix of Mira Calix on Pin Skeeling
- "The Midas Touch" – 1999 – remix of Midnight Star on MASK 500 compilation (as Hell Interface)
- "Poppy Seed (Boards of Canada Remix)" and "Poppy Seed (Reprise) (Boards of Canada Remix)" – 2001 – remix of Slag Boom Van Loon on So Soon
- "Last Walk Around Mirror Lake" – 2003 – remix of Boom Bip on From Left to Right
- "Dead Dogs Two" – 2004 – remix of cLOUDDEAD on Dead Dogs Two
- "Broken Drum" – 2005 – remix of Beck on Guero Deluxe Edition
- "Good Friday (Boards of Canada Remix)" – 2007 – remix of Why? on Alopecia
- "Mr Mistake (Boards of Canada Remix)" – 2016 – remix of NEVERMEN on Nevermen
- "Sisters (Boards of Canada Remix)" – 2016 – remix of Odd Nosdam on Sisters
- "Sometimes (Boards of Canada Remix)" – 2017 – remix of The Sexual Objects on Sometimes Remixes
- "Treat Em Right (Boards of Canada Remix)" – 2021 – remix of NEVERMEN on Nevermen
