= Hooper Bay, Alaska =

Town in Alaska

Hooper Bay Naparyarmiut
- City
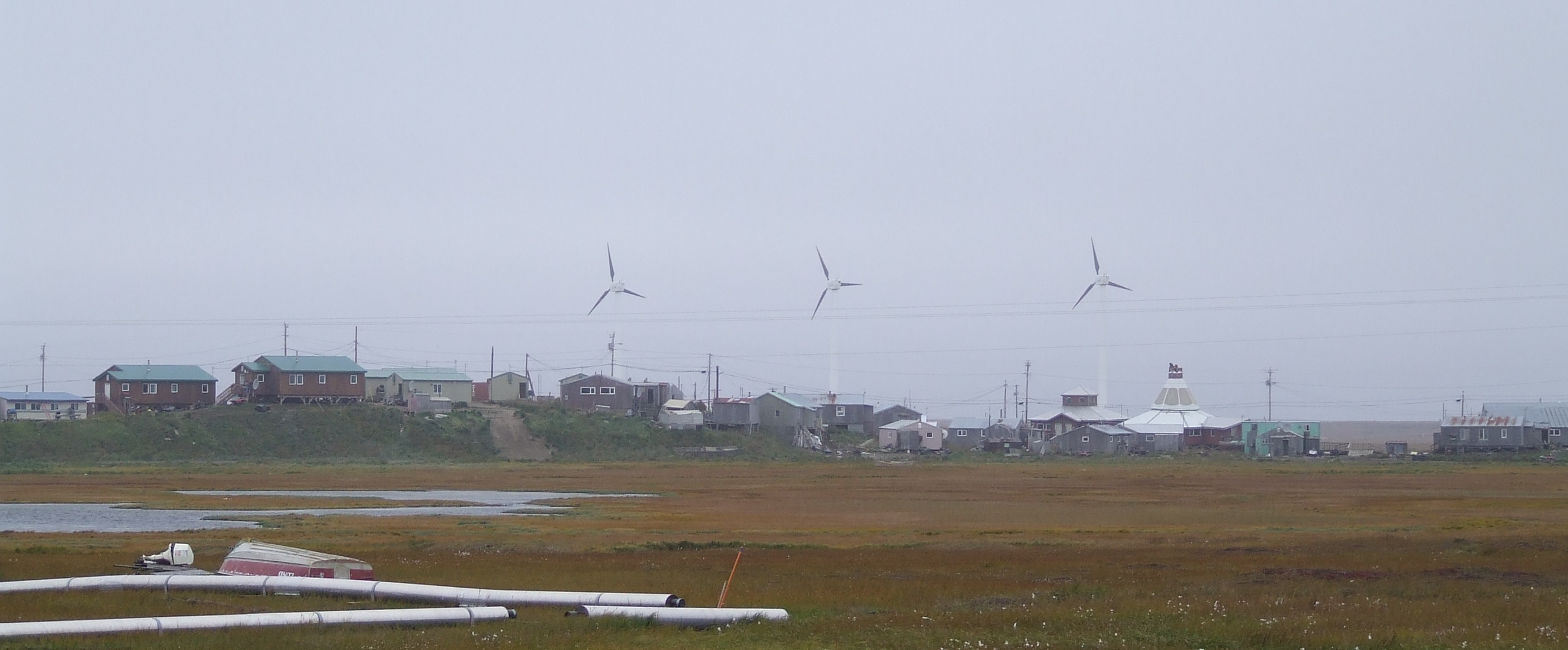
- Hooper Bay with wind turbines in background.

- Location in Alaska
- Coordinates: 61°31′44″N 166°05′46″W
- Country: United States
- State: Alaska
- Census Area: Kusilvak
- Incorporated: February 7, 1966

Government
  - Mayor: Benjamin Nukusuk
  - State senator: Donald Olson (D)
  - State rep.: Neal Foster (D)

Area
  - Total: 7.53 sq mi (19.50 km^{2})
  - Land: 7.50 sq mi (19.42 km^{2})
  - Water: 0.031 sq mi (0.08 km^{2})
- Elevation: 26 ft (8 m)

Population (2020)
  - Total: 1,375
  - Density: 183.4/sq mi (70.81/km^{2})
- Time zone: UTC-9 (Alaska (AKST))
  - Summer (DST): UTC-8 (AKDT)
- ZIP code: 99604
- Area code: 907
- FIPS code: 02-33470
- GNIS feature ID: 1403493

Hooper Bay (Central Yupik: Naparyarmiut) is a city in Kusilvak Census Area, Alaska, United States. At the 2020 census the population was 1,375, up from 1,093 in 2010.

On August 3, 2006, a major fire destroyed approximately fifteen acres of the city including thirty-five structures, twelve homes, the elementary school, middle school, high school, teacher housing complex, stores, offices and storage shelters, leaving 70 people homeless.

== Geography and climate ==
Hooper Bay is located at 61°31′44″N 166°5′46″W (61.528980, -166.096196), 20 miles (32 km) south of Cape Romanzof and 25 miles (40 km) south of Scammon Bay in the Yukon-Kuskokwim Delta. The city is separated into two sections: a heavily built-up townsite located on gently rolling hills, and a newer section in the lowlands.

According to the United States Census Bureau, the city has a total area of 8.8 square miles (23 km^{2}), of which 8.7 square miles (23 km^{2}) is land and 0.1 square miles (0.26 km^{2}) (0.91%) is water.

Hooper Bay is located within the polar climate zone (Köppen ET), because the hottest month is only 49.2 °F (9.6 °C). It is atypical of polar climates in having winters sufficiently moderated by the sea that permafrost is merely sporadic, and in seeing heavy late summer rainfall more typical of subpolar oceanic climates. The substantial maritime moderation, however, means snowfall is heavy, exceeding or approaching 4 inches or 0.10 metres for eight months of the year

Climate data for Cape Romanzof LRRS Airport (1961–1990 normals, extremes 1953–1985)
Month	Jan	Feb	Mar	Apr	May	Jun	Jul	Aug	Sep	Oct	Nov	Dec	Year
Record high °F (°C)	49 (9)	48 (9)	46 (8)	60 (16)	71 (22)	72 (22)	79 (26)	73 (23)	63 (17)	60 (16)	45 (7)	48 (9)	79 (26)
Mean maximum °F (°C)	36.8 (2.7)	33.8 (1.0)	37.0 (2.8)	41.0 (5.0)	53.8 (12.1)	62.6 (17.0)	68.0 (20.0)	64.6 (18.1)	56.4 (13.6)	44.3 (6.8)	38.0 (3.3)	36.6 (2.6)	69.9 (21.1)
Mean daily maximum °F (°C)	18.6 (−7.4)	15.6 (−9.1)	19.6 (−6.9)	26.3 (−3.2)	38.3 (3.5)	48.1 (8.9)	52.8 (11.6)	52.1 (11.2)	46.5 (8.1)	34.7 (1.5)	25.5 (−3.6)	19.7 (−6.8)	33.3 (0.7)
Daily mean °F (°C)	13.7 (−10.2)	10.0 (−12.2)	14.3 (−9.8)	20.9 (−6.2)	34.4 (1.3)	43.5 (6.4)	49.2 (9.6)	49.0 (9.4)	43.8 (6.6)	31.2 (−0.4)	23.2 (−4.9)	14.3 (−9.8)	29.0 (−1.7)
Mean daily minimum °F (°C)	8.7 (−12.9)	5.6 (−14.7)	9.0 (−12.8)	16.4 (−8.7)	29.7 (−1.3)	39.3 (4.1)	45.0 (7.2)	45.4 (7.4)	40.2 (4.6)	28.7 (−1.8)	18.0 (−7.8)	10.1 (−12.2)	24.8 (−4.0)
Mean minimum °F (°C)	−14.0 (−25.6)	−14.1 (−25.6)	−11.7 (−24.3)	−1.6 (−18.7)	16.6 (−8.6)	31.5 (−0.3)	38.8 (3.8)	39.2 (4.0)	32.1 (0.1)	15.7 (−9.1)	3.5 (−15.8)	−9.5 (−23.1)	−19.6 (−28.7)
Record low °F (°C)	−23 (−31)	−26 (−32)	−26 (−32)	−15 (−26)	3 (−16)	25 (−4)	31 (−1)	33 (1)	23 (−5)	4 (−16)	−15 (−26)	−23 (−31)	−26 (−32)
Average precipitation inches (mm)	1.17 (30)	0.84 (21)	0.90 (23)	0.93 (24)	1.41 (36)	2.23 (57)	3.14 (80)	4.54 (115)	4.36 (111)	2.78 (71)	1.46 (37)	1.31 (33)	25.06 (637)
Average snowfall inches (cm)	9.2 (23)	5.3 (13)	7.9 (20)	8.1 (21)	3.9 (9.9)	1.0 (2.5)	0.0 (0.0)	0.0 (0.0)	1.1 (2.8)	9.4 (24)	9.7 (25)	10.1 (26)	65.7 (167)
Average precipitation days (≥ 0.01 inch)	10.9	7.3	9.9	11.3	10.8	12.1	16.3	19.9	18.8	18.2	14.6	10.8	165.9
Average snowy days (≥ 0.01 inch)	10.4	6.6	10.2	11.0	6.1	0.6	0.0	0.0	0.9	12.0	13.3	11.1	82.8
Source 1: WRCC
Source 2: XMACIS (snowfall)

== Demographics ==
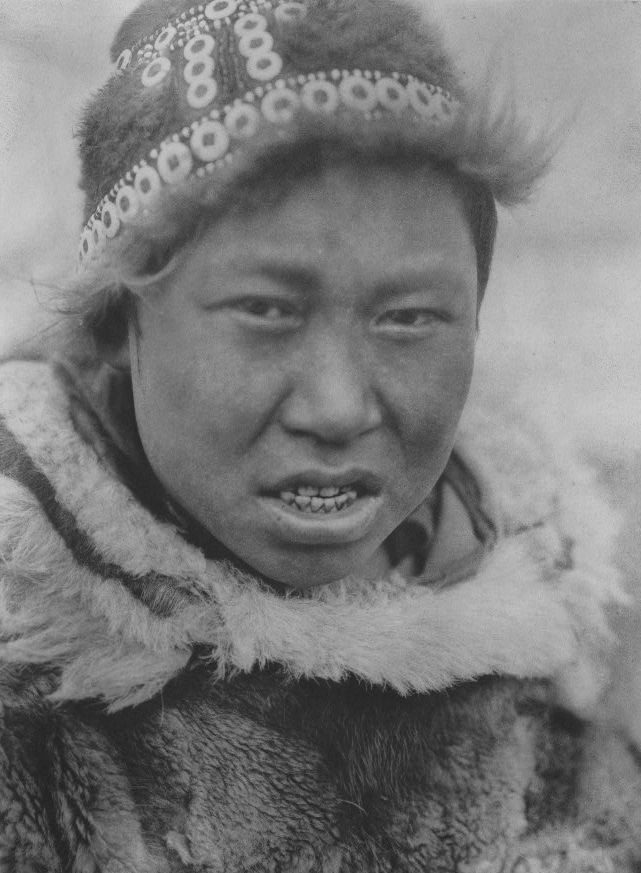
Hooper Bay youth, 1930

Historical population
Census	Pop.	Note	%±
1880	175		—
1890	138		−21.1%
1930	209		—
1940	299		43.1%
1950	307		2.7%
1960	460		49.8%
1970	490		6.5%
1980	627		28.0%
1990	845		34.8%
2000	1,014		20.0%
2010	1,093		7.8%
2020	1,375		25.8%
U.S. Decennial Census

Hooper Bay first appeared on the 1880 U.S. Census as an Yup'ik settlement of Askinuk. On the 1890 census, it returned as Askinaghamiut. It did not appear again until 1930, when it was first returned as Hooper Bay. It formally incorporated in 1966.

=== 2020 census ===
As of the 2020 census, Hooper Bay had a population of 1,375. The median age was 20.4 years. 46.3% of residents were under the age of 18 and 5.7% of residents were 65 years of age or older. For every 100 females there were 101.3 males, and for every 100 females age 18 and over there were 93.0 males age 18 and over.

0.0% of residents lived in urban areas, while 100.0% lived in rural areas.

There were 280 households in Hooper Bay, of which 68.2% had children under the age of 18 living in them. Of all households, 29.3% were married-couple households, 22.5% were households with a male householder and no spouse or partner present, and 32.1% were households with a female householder and no spouse or partner present. About 14.3% of all households were made up of individuals and 4.3% had someone living alone who was 65 years of age or older.

There were 314 housing units, of which 10.8% were vacant. The homeowner vacancy rate was 0.9% and the rental vacancy rate was 7.1%.

Racial composition as of the 2020 census
Race	Number	Percent
White	23	1.7%
Black or African American	2	0.1%
American Indian and Alaska Native	1,330	96.7%
Asian	10	0.7%
Native Hawaiian and Other Pacific Islander	0	0.0%
Some other race	2	0.1%
Two or more races	8	0.6%
Hispanic or Latino (of any race)	1	0.1%

=== 2000 census ===
As of the census of 2000, there were 1,014 people, 227 households, and 187 families residing in the city. The population density was 116.8 inhabitants per square mile (45.1/km^{2}). There were 239 housing units at an average density of 27.5 per square mile (10.6/km^{2}). The racial makeup of the city was 4.24% White, 93.69% Native American, and 2.07% from two or more races. 0.10% of the population were Hispanic or Latino of any race.

There were 227 households, out of which 61.7% had children under the age of 18 living with them, 34.4% were married couples living together, 30.0% had a female householder with no husband present, and 17.6% were non-families. 15.4% of all households were made up of individuals, and 0.9% had someone living alone who was 65 years of age or older. The average household size was 4.47 and the average family size was 4.97.

In the city, the age distribution of the population shows 49.2% under the age of 18, 9.0% from 18 to 24, 24.5% from 25 to 44, 11.5% from 45 to 64, and 5.8% who were 65 years of age or older. The median age was 18 years. For every 100 females, there were 98.8 males. For every 100 females age 18 and over, there were 116.4 males.

The median income for a household in the city was $26,667, and the median income for a family was $27,500. Males had a median income of $31,250 versus $32,083 for females. The per capita income for the city was $7,841. About 28.4% of families and 27.9% of the population were below the poverty line, including 30.1% of those under age 18 and 31.6% of those age 65 or over.

== Education ==
Students in pre-kindergarten through twelfth grade attend Hooper Bay School, also known as Naparyarmiut Elicarviat, administered by the Lower Yukon School District. It is a bilingual school with a Yup'ik language immersion program in kindergarten through third grade, the first program of its kind in the district. High school students have the option of the state's public boarding schools, Nenana Student Living Center and Mt. Edgecumbe High School.

== In popular culture ==
- Hooper Bay is the title of an electronic music album by Boards of Canada.
- An incident in Hooper Bay is featured in Season 4, Episode 8 of Alaska State Troopers.

== Photographs ==
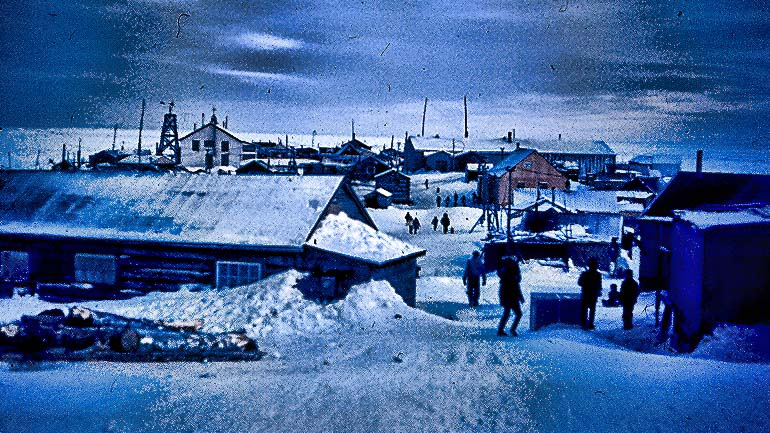
Hooper Bay, Alaska. Looking south through the town in 1969.

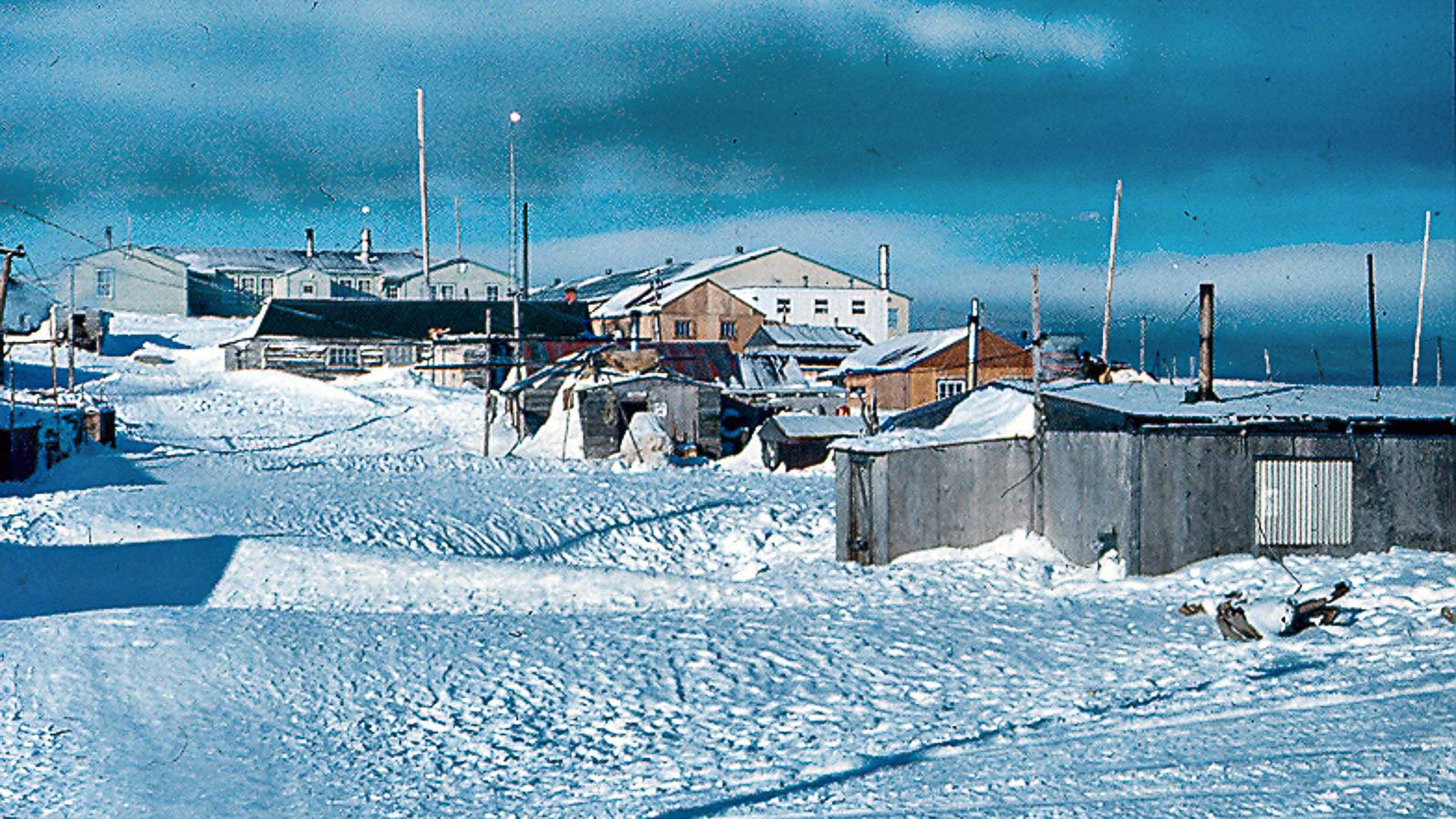

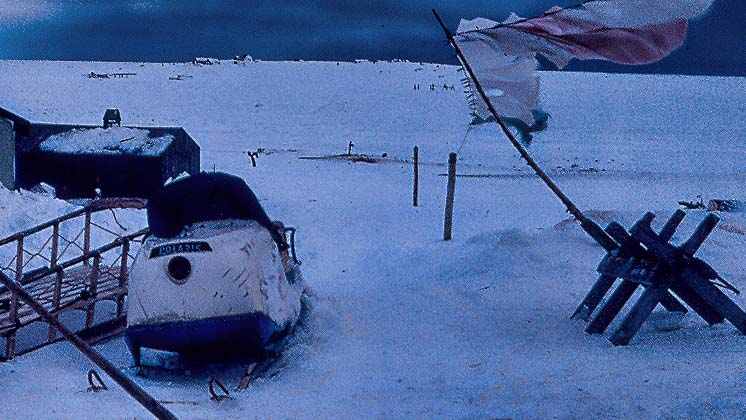

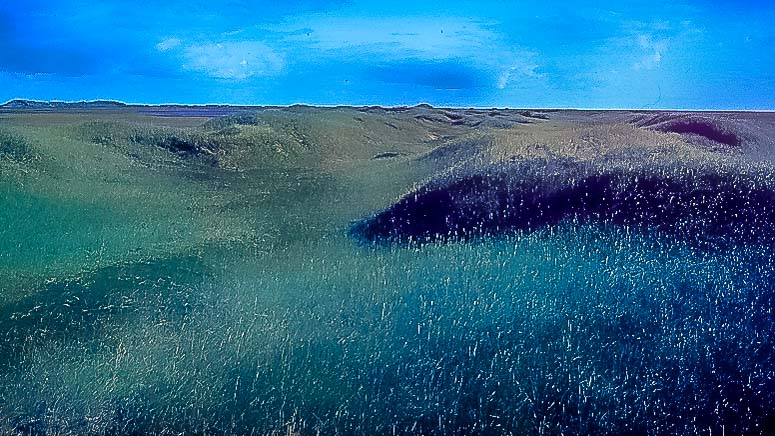
Berms near airport and ocean.

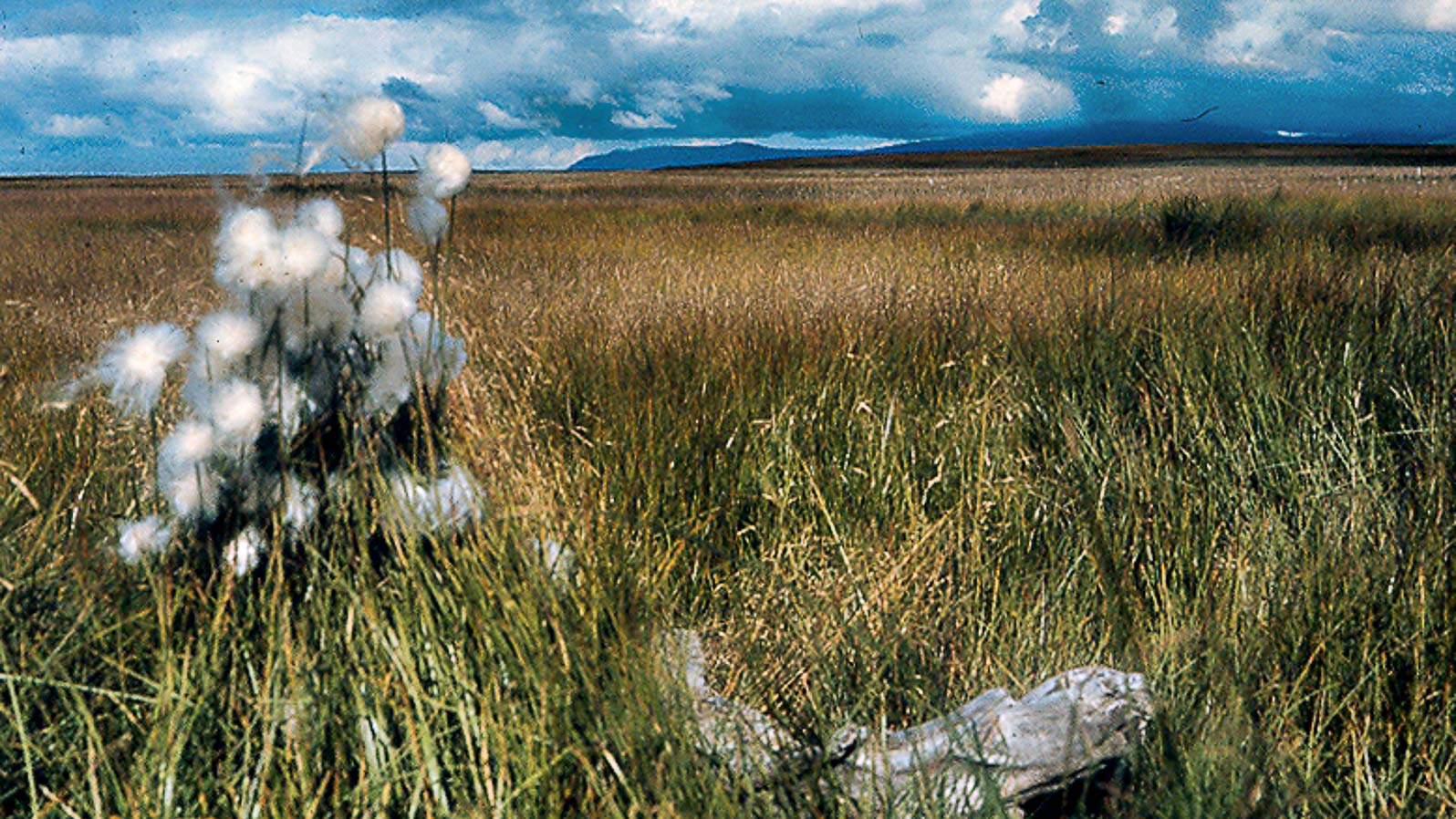
Alaskan tundra outside of Hooper Bay.

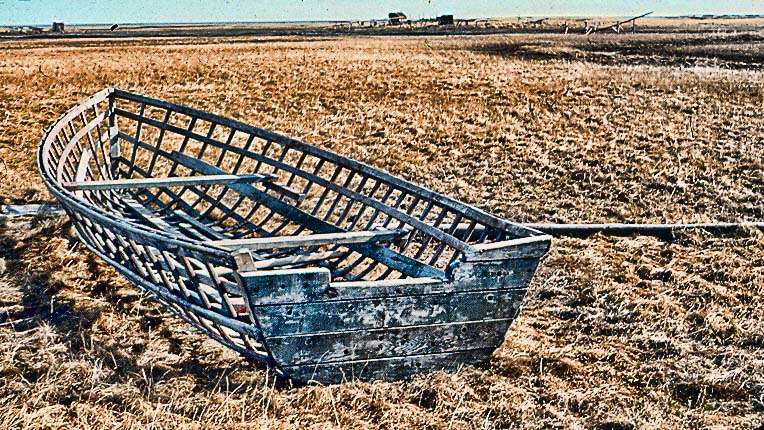

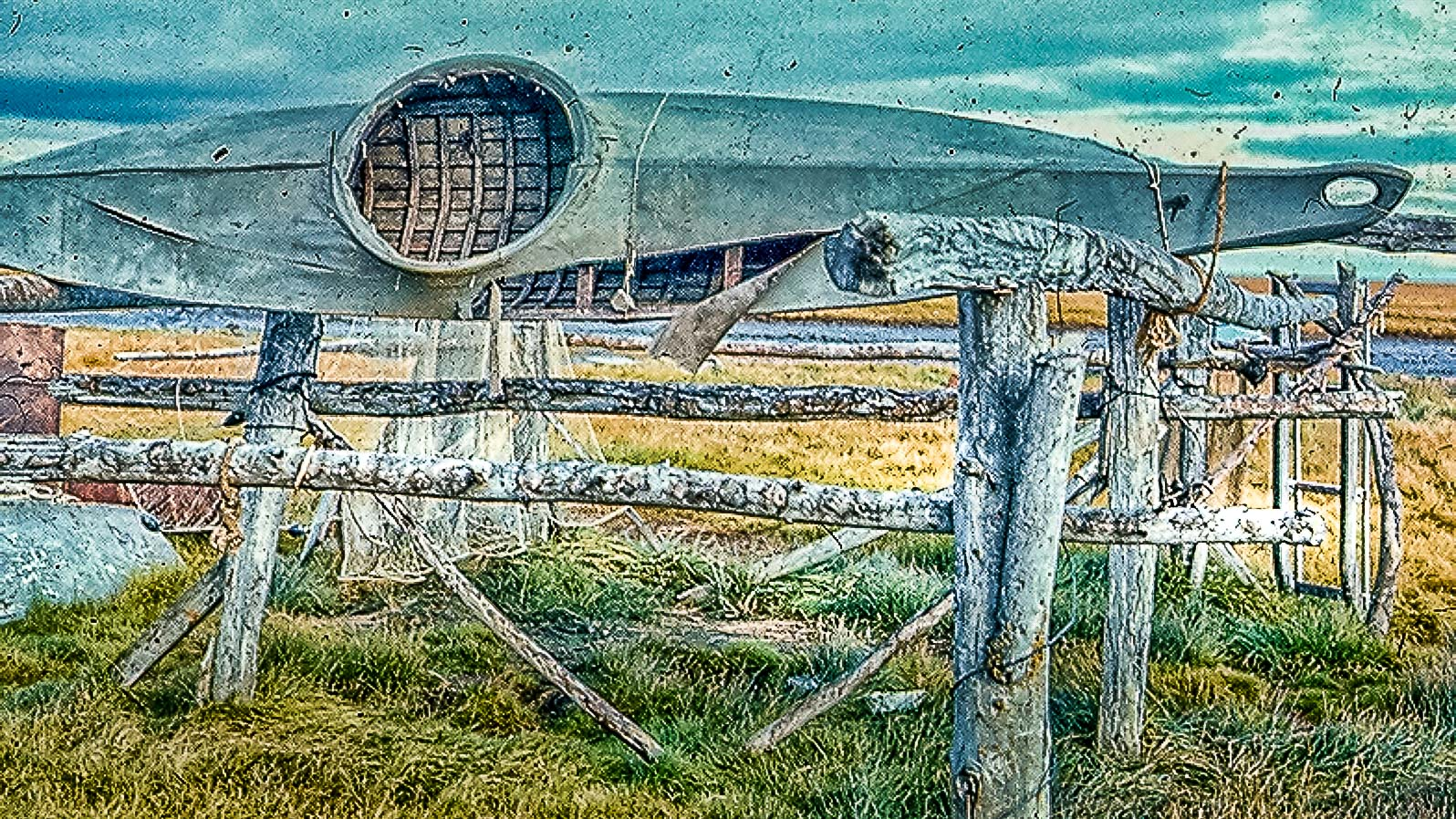

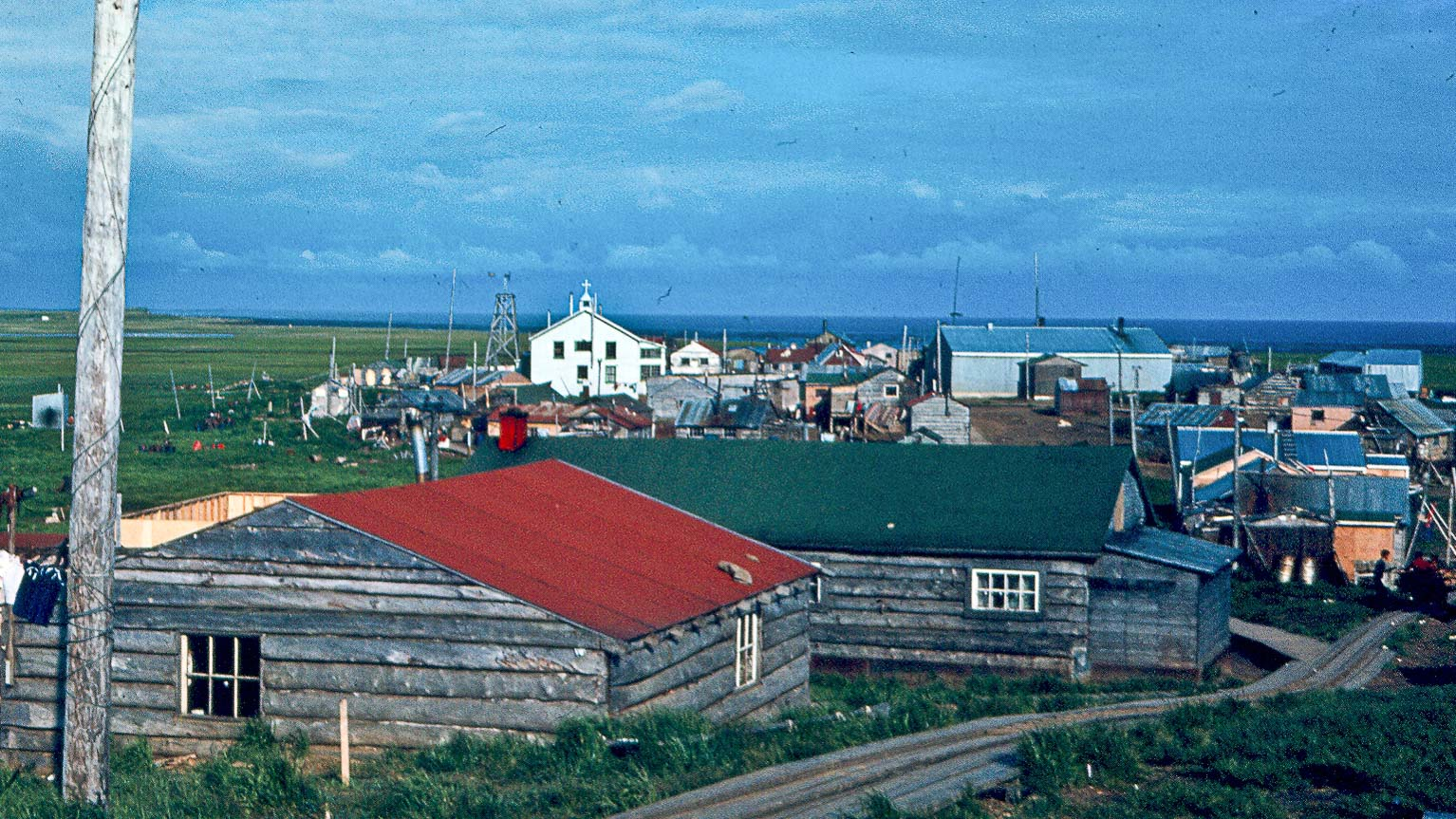
Looking south over Hooper Bay, 1968.

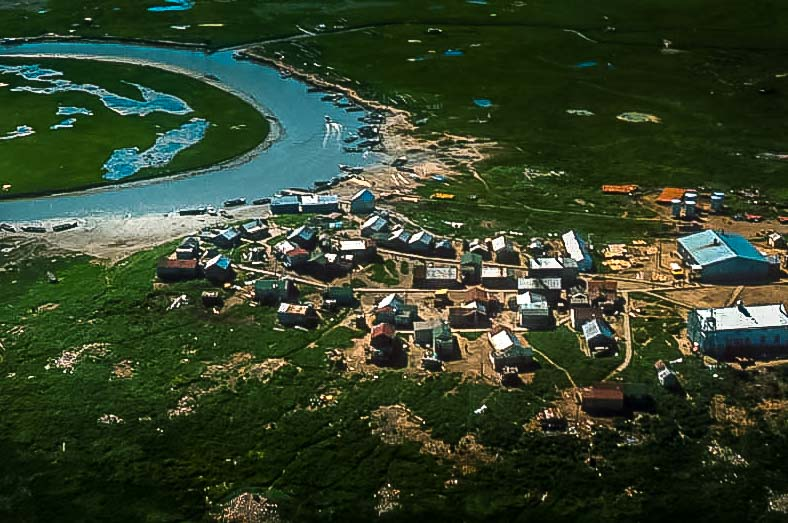

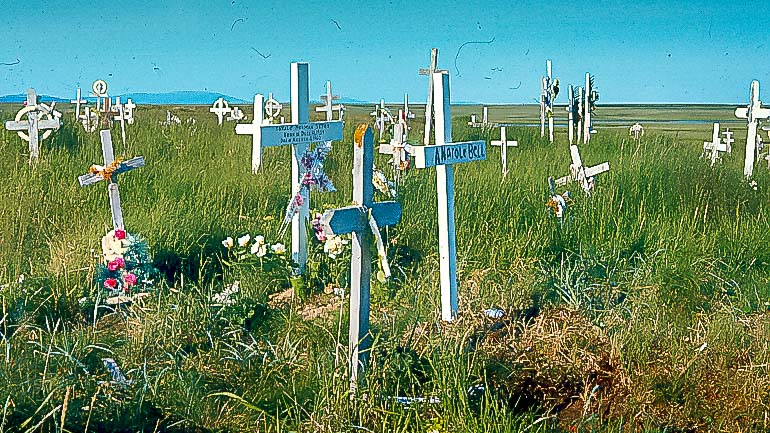

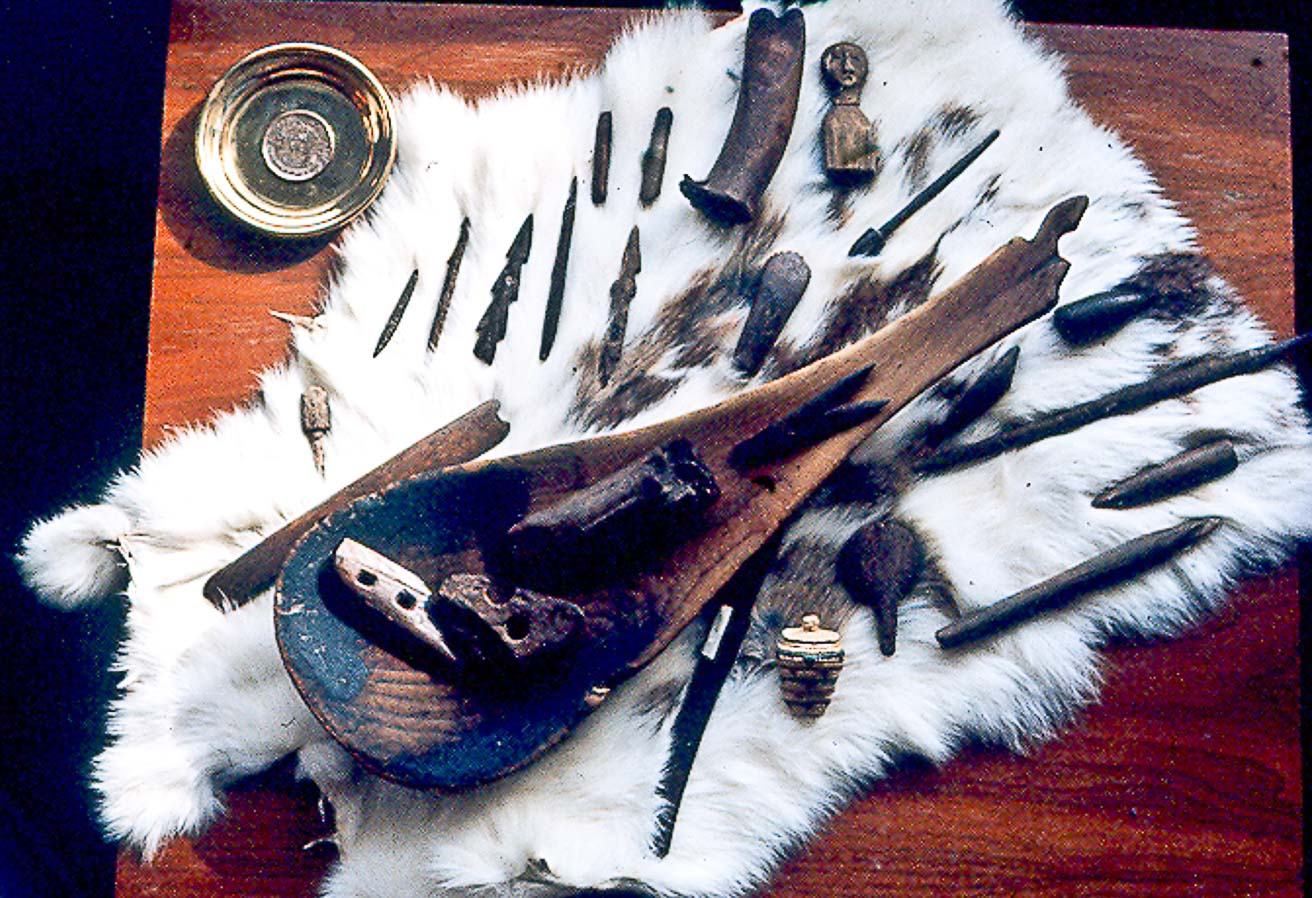
Eskimo kids label artifacts that they find as "Old Timers".

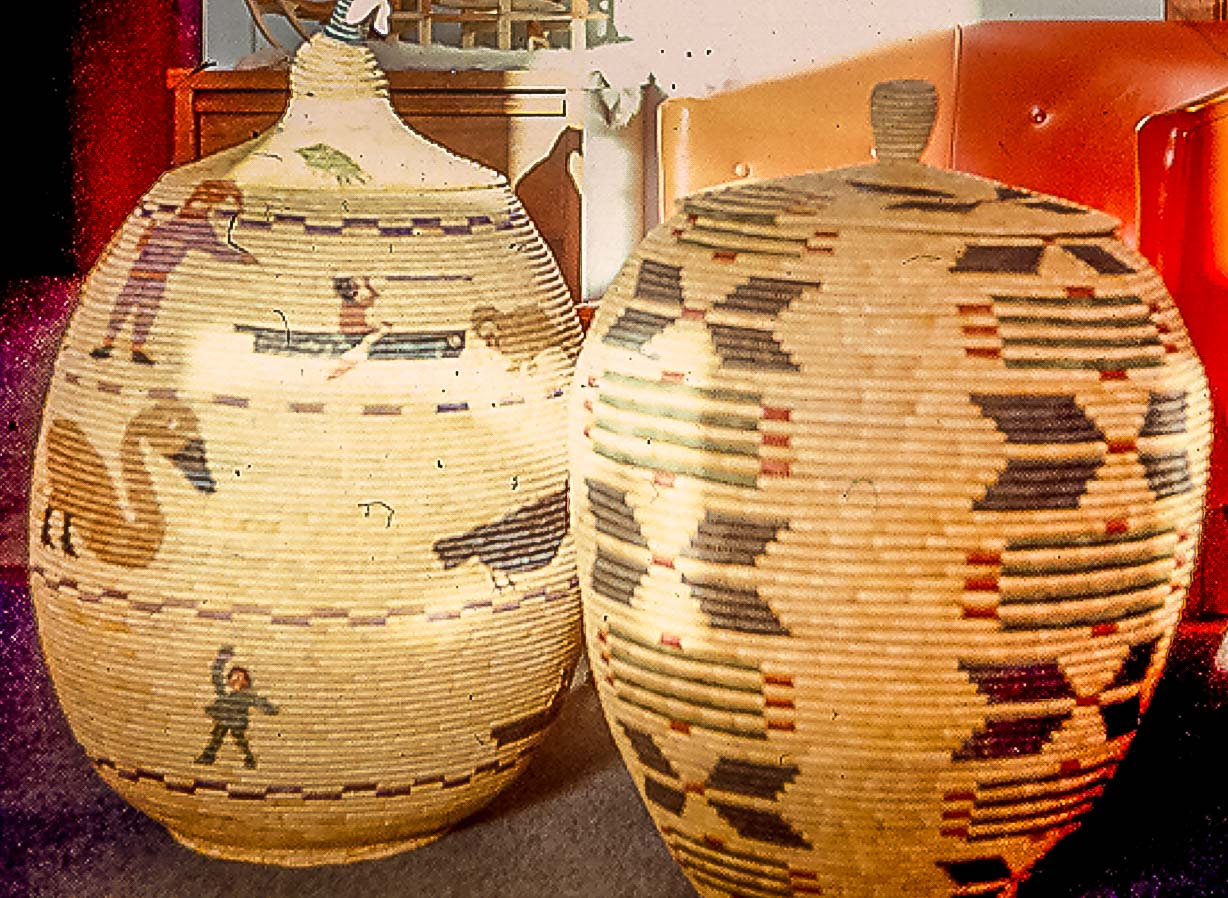
Hooper Bay has been known for high quality baskets for many decades.
