= ------ / ------ / ------ / XXXXXX / ------ / ------ =

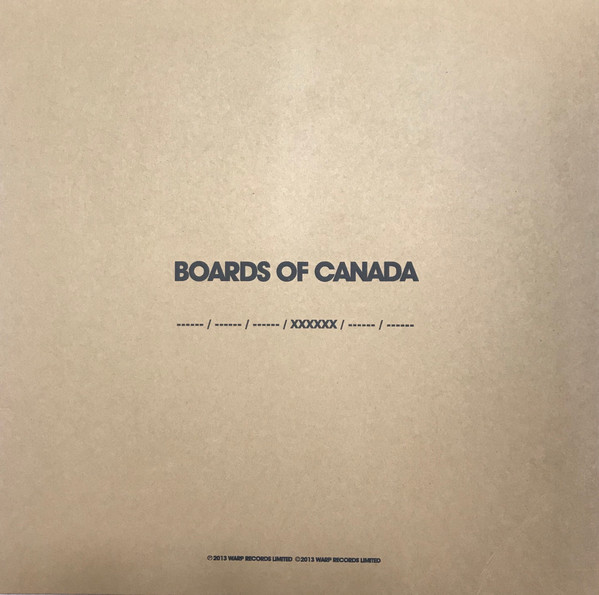

Single by Boards of Canada
- Released: 20 April 2013
- Recorded: 2013
- Studio: Hexagon Sun (Pentland Hills, Scotland)
- Genre: Ambient; electronica
- Length: 0:40
- Label: Warp
- Producers: Marcus Eoin, Mike Sandison

Boards of Canada singles chronology
"Telephasic Workshop / Roygbiv" (1998)	"------ / ------ / ------ / XXXXXX / ------ / ------" (2013)	"Reach for the Dead" (2013)

"------ / ------ / ------ / XXXXXX / ------ / ------" is a song by the Scottish electronic music duo Boards of Canada. It was created as part of a promotional campaign for their fourth studio album, Tomorrow's Harvest (2013). It was exclusively released as a limited-edition single-sided 12-inch vinyl record. While the release of the single coincided with 2013's Record Store Day, the record was hand-delivered to record stores by employees of Warp Records. While six copies of the single are confirmed to exist, only three have been actually found.

== Background ==
After the release of The Campfire Headphase (2005) and Trans Canada Highway (2006), Eoin and Sandison "took some time out, and spent some time travelling". They had also taken time to expand their studio space. In February 2012, a BBC radio personality noted that a new album from Boards of Canada was "on the way". A fan asked the duo on Facebook about this comment, to which they responded with "yes".

== Release ==
On 20 April 2013, the same day as Record Store Day, one person was able to find a copy of the single in Other Music. The release was packaged in a basic cardboard sleeve, with the group's logo and the title of the single on the front. The audio on the record itself consisted of a distorted snippet of music, coupled with a vocoded voice reading the numbers "9-3-6-5-5-7".

Fans realised that the numbers likely formed a code when put together. Other pieces of the sequence were found in various places, such as a Boards of Canada fan forum, a video found on the duo's YouTube account, and two audio clips aired on BBC Radio and NPR Radio. Eventually, the code could be entered on a cryptic website, to which the release date and name of their new album, Tomorrow's Harvest, was revealed.

== Track listing ==
12" single release
No.	Title	Length
1.	"------ / ------ / ------ / XXXXXX / ------ / ------"	0:40
Total length:		0:40
