= Tomorrow's Harvest =

2013 studio album by Boards of Canada

Studio album by Boards of Canada
- Released: 4 June 2013
- Recorded: 2005–2012
- Studios: Hexagon Sun (Pentland Hills, Scotland)
- Genres: Electronica; IDM; ambient
- Length: 62:04
- Labels: Warp; music70
- Producers: Marcus Eoin; Mike Sandison

Boards of Canada chronology
Trans Canada Highway (2006)	Tomorrow's Harvest (2013)	Inferno (2026)

Singles from Tomorrow's Harvest
- 1. "Reach for the Dead" Released: 24 May 2013; 2. "Come to Dust" Released: 26 August 2013

Tomorrow's Harvest is the fourth studio album by Scottish electronic music duo Boards of Canada, released on 4 June 2013 by Warp. The duo began composing and recording following the release of The Campfire Headphase in 2005 and the expansion of their studio at Hexagon Sun near the Pentland Hills. They continued recording intermittently until late 2012, when large parts of the album were recorded. Influenced by film soundtracks from the 1970s and 1980s, Tomorrow's Harvest features a more menacing and foreboding tone, with themes of isolation and decay.

Tomorrow's Harvest was promoted with a cryptic marketing campaign that began on Record Store Day 2013, with the release of an unannounced non-album single that featured part of an unidentified code. A further five codes were released interim through various media and culminated in users gaining access to a new website with information about the album.

== Background ==
Following the release of The Campfire Headphase (2005), Boards of Canada members Marcus Eoin and Mike Sandison "took some time out, and spent some time travelling." The duo expanded their recording studio at Hexagon Sun near Pentland Hills, south-west of Edinburgh, Scotland and "begun sketching out things" for Tomorrow's Harvest. Eoin revealed that "some of the early sketches" for the album were done in rural New Zealand.

The recording sessions for Tomorrow's Harvest began immediately following the release of The Campfire Headphase in 2005; however, in an interview with The Guardian, Marcus Eoin claimed that the band "got heavily into tying it all up [in 2012]." The sessions were held at the band's own recording studio, Hexagon Sun near Pentland Hills, south of the Edinburgh city metro area, Scotland. Describing the sessions, Eoin said he and Sandison "definitely prefer working away from the city because there's a timeless thing in our environment. In an urban setting you can't really escape being reminded of the current year, and music fashions and so on."

During the recording sessions, Boards of Canada used a wide range of vintage hardware and equipment, including an effects unit "that cost [Eoin and Sandison] a lot of time and road miles to source." The band used minimal amounts of drum machine and samplers and used "real live drumming and percussion", which was later "woven into the rhythm tracks." The recording process also included Eoin and Sandison "throw[ing] tracks back and forward at each other." Speaking of the process, Sandison said that "sometimes we jam the core idea down as a take, or one of us will start something and hand it over, and vice-versa. There isn't really one method or any particular strength for either of us because it changes from track to track. We both write melodies but at the same time we're both technicians in some way, so the process is quite unpredictable and messy."

== Composition ==
Tomorrow's Harvest features seventeen tracks written and composed by Marcus Eoin and Mike Sandison. In an interview with The Guardian, Sandison discussed the songwriting process of the tracks, stating: "we often jam something down quickly and you tend to find those things are the ones with a great instant melody." Sandison said that "crafting the tunes into a specific style and time period we want to reference" was a challenging aspect of the process, further noting that "there's a deliberate VHS video-nasty element throughout the record", which was achieved by timing changes in the composition and music to simulate film soundtracks from "around 30 years ago."

Sandison elaborated on the elements of the compositions, including the introduction on "Gemini" and the final sections of "New Seeds", and hoped that they would "imply a visual element." He further explained that some of the tracks finish prematurely, "like actual cues in older soundtracks where they've been ripped out of much longer original masters that nobody ever gets to hear." Sandison described Tomorrow's Harvest's final track, "Semena Mertvykh" (translated from Russian "Семена мёртвых" — "Seeds of the Dead"), as having "a deliberate feeling of complete futility." He also stated that the album was "loaded with patterns and messages" and that the duo used more subliminals on Tomorrow's Harvest than they had on their previous studio albums.

Several film soundtrack composers influenced Tomorrow's Harvest's sound. Boards of Canada listed John Carpenter, Fabio Frizzi, John Harrison and Mark Isham, as well as "grim 70s and 80s movie soundtrack" composers, such as Stefano Mainetti, Riz Ortolani, Paul Giovanni and Wendy Carlos.

== Packaging and themes ==
The front cover artwork for Tomorrow's Harvest features a blurred shot of the city skyline in San Francisco, California, United States. The photograph was taken from Alameda Naval Air Station, a closed naval air station in Alameda, on the San Francisco Bay. Commenting on the artwork, Marcus Eoin referred to it as "an ingredient of the theme on this record" and added, "if you look again at the San Francisco skyline on the cover, it's actually a ghost of the city. You're looking straight through it."

Some, including music magazine The Quietus speculated that the album title was inspired by Deadly Harvest, a 1977 Canadian film about climate change and widespread crop failures in North America, noting that "this idea seems to be reflected by the song titles", in particular "Cold Earth", "Sick Times" and "New Seeds", as well as "the album sleeve and the overall mood of the record." Andrew Burke points out that:

The album's dominant themes, environmental collapse and the degradation and decay of the landscape, fit closely with a strain of genre cinema from the 1970s and 1980s. Most significant perhaps is a late 1970s Canadian film Deadly Harvest released on VHS, an eco-thriller about dwindling resources that features an eerie synth score by John Mills-Cockell.

Erwann Perchoc suggests Mills-Cockell's score anticipates both the sound of the duo and common themes such as agricultural revolt and the end of the world.

Boards of Canada have denied that Tomorrow's Harvest deals with post-apocalyptic themes, stating "it is about an inevitable stage that lies in front of us."

== Release ==
Tomorrow's Harvest's announcement was preceded by a cryptic advertising campaign beginning on Record Store Day 2013. The campaign revealed information about the upcoming release through the distribution of six strings of six-digit numbers. Four of the six codes were released to BBC Radio 1, NPR, Adult Swim and the fansite Twoism; another was released through an unannounced 12-inch single, "------ / ------ / ------ / XXXXXX / ------ / ------", which contained a brief snippet of music and the code; and a sixth code was featured in a YouTube video. Upon the launch of a new Boards of Canada web site, Cosecha Transmisiones (Spanish for "Harvest Transmissions"), the combined codes were used as a password to allow users access to an exclusive video and link to pre-order Tomorrow's Harvest.

On 23 May 2013, "Reach for the Dead" was premiered on Zane Lowe's show on BBC Radio 1 and released as Tomorrow's Harvest's lead single. On 27 May, a listening party for the album was held at Lake Dolores Waterpark. Boards of Canada had previously hinted that it would be played there by tweeting satellite images and uploading a video to YouTube featuring a distorted advertisement for the park titled "Look Sad Reel", an anagram of Lake Dolores.

On 3 June, Boards of Canada premiered the album through a live stream on YouTube, which caused the band's official web site to crash due to "phenomenal demand". Tomorrow's Harvest was broadcast in full in four independent records stores in Ireland on 7 June and in twenty-six stores in the United Kingdom on 10 June in celebration of the album's release.

== Reception ==
Professional ratings
Aggregate scores
Source	Rating
AnyDecentMusic?	8.1/10
Metacritic	85/100
Review scores
Source	Rating
AllMusic	4.5/5 stars
The A.V. Club	B
The Guardian	4/5 stars
The Independent	5/5 stars
Los Angeles Times	3/4 stars
Mojo	4/5 stars
NME	8/10
Pitchfork	8.3/10
Rolling Stone	3.5/5 stars
Spin	9/10

Tomorrow's Harvest received acclaim. At Metacritic, which assigns a weighted average score out of 100 to reviews and ratings from mainstream critics, the album has received a score of 85, based on 35 reviews, indicating "universal acclaim". AllMusic reviewer Heather Phares said that although "the album doesn't reveal any dramatic changes; this is undeniably the work of Boards of Canada, filled with the melancholy melodies and subtly edgy rhythms", adding "it is as comforting as a collection of quietly menacing android fever dreams." Clash reviewer Robin Murray noted that the album "does come with considerable ballast. A sparse, at times morbid middle section does feel tired, over-extended, with the atmosphere of foreboding perhaps being over-played. Yet throughout there are fine ideas billowing out of the slipstream" and summarised that it "burns as brightly as anything they have accomplished thus far." Writing for Consequence of Sound, Michael Roffman noted that the "seraphic ambiance of 1998's Music Has the Right to Children [...] reemerges weathered and with a newfound sense of purpose" and described Tomorrow's Harvest as "emotionally-stirring, calculated epic of ambient electronica".

Drowned in Sound writer George Bass said that Tomorrow's Harvest "managed to successfully touch every part of Boards of Canada's back-catalogue" but added "like My Bloody Valentine, [Boards of Canada] give believers what they want and then carefully expand on it", adding it was "immediately dark and succulent, conjuring a beautiful air of malice" in his nine out of ten review. Writing for The Guardian, Dorian Lynskey described it as "their most cinematic and vast-sounding album yet, suggestive of barren plains and burning skies, wonder and dread, watching and being watched", concluding "Tomorrow's Harvest may not shout for your attention, but it certainly rewards it." The Independent reviewer Laurence Phelan noted that "there is joy in these grooves; the attentive care of studio perfectionists, and the warm embrace of an old friend" and that the album "is instantly and unmistakably identifiable as their own".

Pitchfork reviewer Mark Richardson labelled it among 2013's "Best New Music" and described it as the "most internally focused of Boards of Canada's records. Rather than working around the edges of their sound in search of new territory, Tomorrow's Harvest finds them drawing back toward the center" and noted how "the creative energy [..] is directed toward building textures, which are very deep and rich indeed." Sean McCarthy of PopMatters summarised that "though demanding repeated listens, Tomorrow's Harvest distinguishes itself by making intense commitment" and noted that the album "continues that tradition of complexity and accessibility" in his nine out of ten review. Spin's Andy Beta rated Tomorrow's Harvest nine out of ten and said that "the record draws more from cinema than contemporaneous electronic music", noting that it "captures Terrence Malick's magic-hour light; there's also David Lynch's sense of dread coursing beneath the mundane; the arpeggio-heavy synths that underpin early-'80s horror-movie soundtracks; the Hammer Films catalog; and The Wicker Man itself."

== Track listing ==
All tracks are written by Marcus Eoin and Mike Sandison.

Tomorrow's Harvest track listing
No.	Title	Length
1.	"Gemini"	2:56
2.	"Reach for the Dead"	4:47
3.	"White Cyclosa"	3:13
4.	"Jacquard Causeway"	6:35
5.	"Telepath"	1:32
6.	"Cold Earth"	3:42
7.	"Transmisiones Ferox"	2:18
8.	"Sick Times"	4:16
9.	"Collapse"	2:49
10.	"Palace Posy"	4:05
11.	"Split Your Infinities"	4:28
12.	"Uritual"	1:59
13.	"Nothing Is Real"	3:52
14.	"Sundown"	2:16
15.	"New Seeds"	5:39
16.	"Come to Dust"	4:07
17.	"Semena Mertvykh"	3:30
Total length:		62:04

== Personnel ==
All personnel credits adapted from Tomorrow's Harvest's liner notes.

Boards of Canada

- Marcus Eoin – production, recording, design, artwork
- Mike Sandison – production, recording, design, artwork

== Charts ==
=== Weekly charts ===
Weekly chart performance for Tomorrow's Harvest
Chart (2013)	Peak position
Australian Albums (ARIA)	24
Belgian Albums (Ultratop Flanders)	7
Belgian Albums (Ultratop Wallonia)	33
Canadian Albums (Billboard)	12
Danish Albums (Hitlisten)	23
Dutch Albums (Album Top 100)	19
Finnish Albums (Suomen virallinen lista)	28
French Albums (SNEP)	130
German Albums (Offizielle Top 100)	52
Irish Albums (IRMA)	7
Irish Albums (IRMA)	7
Irish Independent Albums (IRMA)	2
Italian Albums (FIMI)	64
Japanese Albums (Oricon)	27
New Zealand Albums (RMNZ)	26
Norwegian Albums (VG-lista)	9
Scottish Albums (Official Charts)	4
Spanish Albums (Promusicae)	93
Swedish Albums (Sverigetopplistan)	32
Swiss Albums (Schweizer Hitparade)	35
UK Albums (Official Charts)	7
UK Dance Albums (Official Charts)	3
UK Independent Albums (Official Charts)	1
US Billboard 200	13
US Independent Albums (Billboard)	2
US Top Dance Albums (Billboard)	2
US Indie Store Album Sales (Billboard)	3

=== Year-end charts ===
Year-end chart performance for Tomorrow's Harvest
Chart (2013)	Position
Belgian Albums (Ultratop Flanders)	195
US Top Dance/Electronic Albums (Billboard)	19

== Release history ==
Release dates and formats for Tomorrow's Harvest
Region	Date	Format(s)	Label	Distributor	Catalogue
Japan	5 June 2013	2×LP; CD; digital download	Warp	Beat	BRC-382
Australia	7 June 2013	2×LP; CD; digital download	Warp	Inertia	—N/a
Europe	10 June 2013	2×LP; CD; digital download	Warp	Warp	WARP257
North America	11 June 2013	2×LP; CD; digital download	Warp	Warp	WARP257
