= Aquarius (EP) =

EP by Boards of Canada
- Released: 5 January 1998
- Recorded: 1997
- Studios: Hexagon Sun, Pentland Hills
- Genres: Trip hop; downtempo; psychedelic rap; IDM
- Length: 13:12
- Label: Skam
- Producers: Michael Sandison; Marcus Eoin

Boards of Canada chronology
Hi Scores (1996)	Aquarius (1998)	Music Has the Right to Children (1998)

Aquarius is an EP by Boards of Canada, released on 5 January 1998.

The title track would go on to appear on the duo's debut album Music has the Right to Children, released later the same year.

== Reception ==
Trace Reddell wrote "Aquarius is one of the most openly joyous moments Boards of Canada have ever produced."

== Track listing ==
No.	Title	Length
1.	"Aquarius"	5:59
2.	"Chinook"	7:13
Total length:		13:12
