= Peel Session (Boards of Canada EP) =

EP by Boards of Canada
- Released: 11 January 1999
- Recorded: 16 June 1998; Maida Vale Studios
- Genre: IDM
- Length: 24:56 (2019 re-release); 17:01 (1999 release)
- Label: Warp WAP114
- Producers: Michael Sandison, Marcus Eoin

Boards of Canada chronology
Music Has the Right to Children (1998)	Peel Session (1999)	In a Beautiful Place Out in the Country (2000)

Professional ratings
Review scores
Source	Rating
AllMusic	4/5 stars

Peel Session is an EP by Boards of Canada, featuring the tracks played on their 1998 Peel Session broadcast on BBC Radio 1. It was originally released on 11 January 1999 as a 12" and CD by Warp Records, with catalogue numbers WAP114 and WAP114CD, respectively.

The music was written & produced at the band's Hexagon Sun studio in June 1998. The BBC website and the privately released Peel Session June 1998 CD-R on the band's own Music70 label both indicate the recordings for broadcast were made on 16 June 1998 at the BBC's Maida Vale Studios.

As with all Peel sessions, four tracks were recorded for it. One of the four, "XYZ", was not included on the 1999 release due to sample licensing issues.

All versions released on Warp exclude the actual live recording of "Happy Cycling", as it was deemed unsatisfactory by the band. Instead, they contain a re-recorded studio version of the track.

== Air dates ==
Actual airdates are unverified.

Recordings made from the radio indicate the music aired at least twice. In what is apparently the first airing, Peel actually speaks with the band before the first song, "XYZ", which is introduced by one of the band members. In the other airing, there's no banter with the band; Peel alone introduces "Aquarius" as the first song and "XYZ" as the last song.

On the Warp release, the annotation TX 21/07/98 appears on the front cover, and CD copies have the same date on the disc, suggesting at least one airing occurred on 21 July 1998.

== Reissue ==
In September 2019, Warp Records announced that the EP would be re-released on 15 November 2019 to celebrate the record label's 30th anniversary. The re-release features "XYZ", which was also uploaded to YouTube alongside the announcement.

== Track listing ==
All tracks are written by Marcus Eoin and Michael Sandison.

1999 release tracklisting
No.	Title	Length
1.	"Aquarius (Version 3)"	6:24
2.	"Happy Cycling"	7:56
3.	"Olson (Version 3)"	2:31
Total length:		16:51

November 2019 re-release tracklisting
No.	Title	Length
1.	"Aquarius (Version 3)"	6:24
2.	"Happy Cycling"	7:56
3.	"Olson (Version 3)"	2:31
4.	"XYZ"	8:05
Total length:		24:56

Annotated titles on the BBC website about the broadcast
No.	Title	Length
1.	"Aquarius"
2.	"Happy Cycling (Changed From Bad Day)"
3.	"Olson"
4.	"Xyz (Pronounced X Y Zee)"
