= Reach for the Dead =

Single by Boards of Canada

from the album Tomorrow's Harvest
- Released: 23 May 2013
- Recorded: 2005–2012 at Hexagon Sun near Pentland Hills, Scotland
- Genre: Downtempo; drone
- Length: 4:47
- Label: Warp
- Songwriters: Marcus Eoin; Mike Sandison
- Producers: Marcus Eoin; Mike Sandison

Boards of Canada singles chronology
"------ / ------ / ------ / XXXXXX / ------ / ------" (2013)	"Reach for the Dead" (2013)	"Introit / Prophecy at 1420 MHz" (2026)

"Reach for the Dead" is a song by the Scottish electronic music duo Boards of Canada. It is the second track and lead single from the duo's fourth studio album, Tomorrow's Harvest (2013). "Reach for the Dead" was premiered on Zane Lowe's programme on BBC Radio 1 on 23 May 2013 and released later the same day on Warp Records' official SoundCloud.

The single was preceded by "------ / ------ / ------ / XXXXXX / ------ / ------", an exclusive 12" single released on Record Store Day 2013, which contained cryptic clues about Tomorrow's Harvest's release. A music video directed by Neil Krug, a Los Angeles–based photographer, was later premiered in Tokyo, Japan, and a reversed version of the video was released online. Critical reception to "Reach for the Dead" was generally positive.

== Release and reception ==
"Reach for the Dead" was premiered on Zane Lowe's programme on BBC Radio 1 on 23 May 2013. Following the broadcast, it was released on Warp Records official SoundCloud and made available through online digital retailers. A promotional CD single was released in Europe on 17 June 2013, following Tomorrow's Harvest's release.

Critical response to "Reach for the Dead" was very positive. Billboard writer Lars Bradle said that "if [Boards of Canada]'s followers were hoping for an upbeat treat in the vein of 2005's 'Dayvan Cowboy,' then think again. 'Reach for the Dead' finds the act in an experimental, and slightly off-key mode. It's a haunting track. There's not a hint of a drum beat until the 2:50-minute mark. But it's unmistakably [Boards of Canada]." He added that "the duo don't make bombastic music [...] but in the world of low-key electronic music, they're arguably the best at what they do." Brock Thiessen of Exclaim! wrote: "much like you'd expect, the track takes a sombre route, hitting those [Boards of Canada] touchstones while adding a whole new layer of updated and wicked-eerie atmospherics to the mix" and The A.V. Club's Marah Eakin noted that "Reach for the Dead" was "for all intents and purposes, a Boards of Canada single, complete with experimental tones and a complete lack of drums for most of the track." Nick Neyland of Pitchfork Media stated that the song is "much darker than most of their prior material, marrying the mournfulness of Popol Vuh's soundtrack work with the swell of underground artists producing John Carpenter-indebted electronica." Tom Breihan of Stereogum described the song as "an ominous, humming instrumental drone-piece with just a few hints of the sad nostalgia that the group used to radiate." He also stated that "until the glitchy drums kick in two-thirds of the way through", the song sounds like "something that would be playing on the score of a great '80s sci-fi movie."

== Music video ==
The music video for "Reach for the Dead" was directed by Neil Krug, a Los Angeles–based photographer and director who had previously created an unofficial music video for the Boards of Canada song "In a Beautiful Place Out in the Country". The music video features "hazy imagery of a mid-west desert and its anonymous, bleak ghost-town." Billboard referred to the video as "a precise fit" for "the tune's warm, sweeping sounds." NPR writer Otis Hart praised Krug's direction, comparing his work on "Reach for the Dead" to "In a Beautiful Place Out in the Country" and describing it as "equally beautiful, but way more eerie."

"Reach for the Dead"'s music video premiered in Tokyo, Japan at midnight on 23 May 2013. The video was projected on a large screen, which was attached to a building in Shibuya, one of the special wards of Tokyo. The video was later released on YouTube and Vimeo. The following day, Warp Records published a post on Twitter, "with no context or reason", and announced the release of a reversed version of the video.

== Track listing ==
Digital download and European promotional CD

1. "Reach for the Dead" – 4:47
