= Inferno (Boards of Canada album) =

2026 studio album

Studio album by Boards of Canada
- Released: 29 May 2026
- Studios: Hexagon Sun (Pentland Hills, Scotland)
- Genres: Electronic; ambient; IDM; hauntology
- Length: 69:51
- Label: Warp
- Producer: Mike Sandison

Boards of Canada chronology
Tomorrow's Harvest (2013)	Inferno (2026)

Singles from Inferno
- 1. "Introit / Prophecy at 1420 MHz" Released: 7 May 2026

Inferno is the fifth studio album by Scottish electronic music duo Boards of Canada, released on 29 May 2026 by Warp Records. Recorded at Hexagon Sun studio in Pentland Hills, Scotland, Inferno was the duo's first studio album since Tomorrow's Harvest in 2013. The album has been classified as ambient music, IDM, and hauntology, and has been called Boards of Canada's response to a darker zeitgeist, incorporating allusions to biblical themes, spirituality, and the occult. The instrumentation of Inferno includes guitars, live drums, and synths, creating a live sound alongside prominent sampled vocals. Duo members Mike Sandison and Marcus Eoin are both credited as instrumentalists and sound designers, with all production and writing on a majority of the tracks credited solely to Sandison.

The promotional campaign began in April 2026 when unlabeled VHS cassettes were mailed to fans and posters appeared in various cities worldwide. The track "Deep Time" (originally designated "Tape 05") was shared online later that month, followed by the official announcement of the album. The single "Introit / Prophecy at 1420 MHz" was released in early May, accompanied by a music video directed by Robert Beatty. Listening sessions were held in seven locations across the world later that month, and public controversy arose when the White House co-opted the album's aesthetic for political messaging, which Warp condemned. Inferno received critical praise for its musicality, thematic content, and pertinence to the zeitgeist. The album charted in the top ten of several national record charts.

== Background and composition ==
Inferno is Boards of Canada's first studio album in thirteen years, following Tomorrow's Harvest in 2013. It was recorded at the duo's Hexagon Sun studio in Pentland Hills, Scotland, with mastering done by Matt Colton at Metropolis Studios, London. Inferno has been described as electronic, ambient, IDM, and hauntology. It was called the duo's response to a darker zeitgeist; this tone has been compared with their albums Geogaddi (2002) and Tomorrow's Harvest. It alludes to biblical themes, spirituality, and the occult.

Around half of the tracks are instrumentals. The instrumentation of Inferno features guitars, live drums, and heavy synths, creating a live sound. The music has been compared to that of Brian Eno, the Avalanches, and Mogwai. "Prophecy at 1420 MHz" has live drums and guitar, "Hydrogen Helium Lithium Leviathan" is based on heavy synths, and "Somewhere Right Now in the Future" takes a dream pop style. "Naraka", named for the Sanskrit term for "Hell", has droning synths, "Memory Death" contains buzzing flies and what has been described as an inhaling chime or beeping, and "Into the Magic Land" has been described as post-rock. "Deep Time" features strings and tympani, "Arena Americanada" takes on an early IDM style with heavy synths, and "I Saw Through Platonia" is based on a recording of the human heartbeat.

The first half of the album in particular contains prominent voice sampling. "Prophecy at 1420 MHz" features altered samples of the voice of Islamic scholar Seyyed Hossein Nasr; "Age of Capricorn" begins with references to the Antichrist and Osama bin Laden, transitioning into a sample of a Christian televangelist sermon; and "Father and Son" contains a conversation from the 1971 documentary film The Jesus Trip in which a man declares to his father that he loves the Lord "more than any physical being". "Naraka" features Hare Krishna chanting; "The Word Becomes Flesh" features a woman describing embryo development; "All Reason Departs" features a sampled recording quoting Aleister Crowley's words about a "magical operation" for "the initiation of a new Aeon", and a bloody sacrifice for a ceremony regarding the "Lord of the Aeon"; and "The Process" features apparent word salad spoken by a female synthesised voice.

== Promotion and release ==
Inferno was released on 29 May 2026 via Warp in a variety of formats including digital download, standard double vinyl LP, CD, and cassette. No interviews followed the announcement; Warp's marketing was described as a "noisy anti-campaign" by Rolling Stone, and prior to the official release, reviewers in the media were provided with album streams that could only be used three times. Copies of a special edition translucent red double vinyl LP were accompanied by a hexagon-shaped 8" flexi disc featuring the additional track "Vol. 4 – P. Primers – 177 Giraud's Mirror". Artwork in the 16-page booklet included with physical copies was attributed to Boards of Canada. The track "The Word Becomes Flesh" was used as the end credits music for the A24 film Backrooms, released the same day as Inferno.

Inferno's promotional campaign began in early April 2026, when unsolicited VHS cassettes were mailed to physical addresses that had previously made purchases from Boards of Canada's longtime record label Warp Records, and posters were put up in various cities around the world. The tapes contained stylized vintage visuals similar to the aesthetics of previous Boards of Canada releases. A website previously used for clues in Tomorrow's Harvest's marketing campaign was also revived with a message reading "nobody home..." in both English and morse code. On 16 April, Boards of Canada shared a video entitled "Tape 05" set to a then-untitled track which was their first original piece of music released in thirteen years. Initially thought to be the fifth track on the album due to its similar length, "Tape 05" ultimately appeared on the album under the title "Deep Time".

Inferno was announced on 22 April 2026, accompanied by a 42-second trailer featuring a snippet of new music. The clip features a hexagonal shape associated with Boards of Canada bathed in morphing colours. On 7 May, a music video directed by Robert Beatty for the first two tracks of the album, "Introit / Prophecy at 1420 MHz", was released. Listening sessions for the album took place in Barcelona, Berlin, Glasgow, London, Los Angeles, New York and Tokyo on 22 May. A day prior to the release of the album, the White House's social media accounts posted a video incorporating a segment of "Deep Time" with grainy visuals featuring nationalist and military imagery. Following negative public reaction, Warp issued an official response stating that neither the label nor the duo "condone[d] the unauthorised use of their music for political messaging."

== Critical reception ==
Professional ratings
Aggregate scores
Source	Rating
AnyDecentMusic?	7.9/10
Metacritic	85/100
Review scores
Source	Rating
AllMusic	4/5 stars
Beats Per Minute	90%
Clash	9/10
The Guardian	2/5 stars
Mojo	4/5 stars
MusicOMH	5/5 stars
Pitchfork	8.6/10
Record Collector	5/5 stars
Rolling Stone	4/5 stars
Uncut	9/10

According to the review aggregator Metacritic, Inferno received "universal acclaim" based on a weighted average score of 85 out of 100 from 21 critics. The review aggregator site AnyDecentMusic? compiled 21 reviews and gave it an average of 7.9 out of 10.

Anticipation for the album, its relevance, and its relation to the contemporary political environment were highlighted by critics, and many wrote that Inferno justified the thirteen year long wait since Tomorrow's Harvest. The Skinny's Lewis Wade wrote that Inferno represented "a dark reaction to uncertain, sinister times", Uncut's Michael Bonner felt the age of social media and artificial intelligence was a pertinent time to release Inferno, and many reviewers agreed that the present times and political events were inspirations for the album. AllMusic's Heather Phares opined at Inferno's release "the feeling that the apocalypse was nigh was perhaps more prominent than any other time", and that though that Boards of Canada were "steeped in the past, they won't be consigned to it". Resident Advisor's Sasha Geffen felt that "against the turmoil of the current cultural moment, this is some of the most placid and enchanting music" the duo have released. In contrast, The Guardian's Ben Beaumont-Thomas found the album a "big disappointment" and "stuck in the past", and he compared the duo unfavourably to their contemporaries, while Financial Times's Ludovic Hunter-Tilney felt the album's apocalyptic themes were relevant but had a negative effect on its musicality.

The musical style and production were another common focus of reviews. Beats Per Minute's Todd Dedman felt Inferno marked a divergence from the "amniotic fluid quality" of previous records, adopting a "clinical and driven feel", and MusicOMH's Steven Johnson wrote that Inferno challenged and expanded the duo's "sonic palette". Hunter-Tilney stated the prominence of drums and electric guitars made for a gothic and post-punk feel, and Pitchfork's Philip Sherburne agreed on the "unusually gothic cast" of the guitars. Geffen wrote that Inferno was more direct in its "unadulterated menace" compared to the "generalised unease" of past records, The Wall Street Journal's Mark Richardson assessed the album was on the darker end of the band's discography, describing the music as "bleak and beautiful" with the mood being "apprehensive and uneasy", while Phares wrote there was "glassy clarity" in the production. Rolling Stone's Michaelangelo Matos found the album "lush, rich, and cinematic", both embodying and going past musical genres. Of the vocals, Bonner wrote that they ranged from creating "arresting and beautiful moments" to having "characteristically abstract menace", Mojo's Andrew Male compared the sampled religious speeches to those in Brian Eno and David Byrne's 1981 album My Life In the Bush of Ghosts, and Exclaim's Daryl Keating speculated that the vocals on Inferno were more purposeful than on previous Boards of Canada albums.

Critics also discussed the underlying themes and overall vision of Inferno. Richardson argued that the spiritual theme of the album "hints at a world abandoned by God and on the brink of catastrophe", Geffen wrote that the sounds of the human heartbeat at the end of the album "pinch[es] Inferno's themes" on faith and the divine "to a subtle point", and Paste's Grant Sharples felt that considering the themes of time, religion, and universal origin made for a deeper artistic connection. Sherburne wrote that Inferno serves as a broader investigation of faith, human biology, and existential doubt, while Record Collector's David Pollock speculated on the underlying sense of "humanity's need for meaning and tendency to catastrophise". Wade opined Inferno was "a long-form meditation on a chaotic world that refuses to explain itself", proving to be "wonky" and unnerving, and Male wrote the album invokes "a more sinister purpose", creating a "tense, uneasy mood" occasionally abandoned for a "zoned-out summer drift". Beaumont-Thomas's negative review argued that the album was dull, but "at least [Boards of Canada] are engaging in ideas". Several reviewers felt the re-listening to the album provided a deeper understanding of the thematic and musical content, while others praised the addition the album made to Boards of Canada's mythos.

== Track listing ==
Inferno's physical release credits all writing to Mike Sandison; streaming services credit all writing to Boards of Canada. ASCAP Songview lists individual writing credits, which are as follows:

Inferno track listing
No.	Title	Writer(s)	Length
1.	"Introit"	Mike Sandison	0:36
2.	"Prophecy at 1420 MHz"	Sandison, Marcus Eoin	5:04
3.	"Hydrogen Helium Lithium Leviathan"	Sandison	4:44
4.	"Age of Capricorn"	Sandison	3:52
5.	"Father and Son"	Sandison	3:24
6.	"Somewhere Right Now in the Future"	Sandison	2:26
7.	"Naraka"	Sandison	5:01
8.	"Acts of Magic"	Sandison	1:18
9.	"Memory Death"	Sandison	2:37
10.	"The Word Becomes Flesh"	Sandison	5:20
11.	"Into the Magic Land"	Sandison, Eoin	4:35
12.	"Blood in the Labyrinth"	Sandison, Eoin	4:55
13.	"Deep Time"	Sandison	3:18
14.	"All Reason Departs"	Sandison, Eoin	6:14
15.	"Arena Americanada"	Sandison, Eoin	5:22
16.	"The Process"	Sandison, Eoin	3:01
17.	"You Retreat in Time and Space"	Sandison	5:25
18.	"I Saw Through Platonia"	Sandison	2:39
Total length:			69:51

Bonus track, included as flexi disc with red double vinyl LP
No.	Title	Writer(s)	Length
19.	"Vol.4 – P. Primers – 177 Giraud's Mirror"	Sandison, Eoin	3:24
Total length:			73:15

== Personnel ==
Credits are adapted from the vinyl's liner notes.

- Mike Sandison – electronics, synthesisers, tapes, programming, audio evocations, drums, percussion, guitars, bass, string instruments, processes, sound design, production, recording, artwork, films, photo collage, design
- Marcus Eoin – electronics, synthesisers, tapes, processes, sound design, recording, artwork, films, photo collage, design
- Matt Colton – mastering

== Charts ==
Chart performance for Inferno
Chart (2026)	Peak position
Australian Albums (ARIA)	3
Austrian Albums (Ö3 Austria)	28
Belgian Albums (Ultratop Flanders)	4
Belgian Albums (Ultratop Wallonia)	5
Canadian Albums (Billboard)	18
Croatian International Albums (HDU)	15
Danish Albums (Hitlisten)	13
Dutch Albums (Album Top 100)	6
Finnish Albums (Suomen virallinen lista)	5
French Albums (SNEP)	35
German Albums (Offizielle Top 100)	4
Irish Albums (Official Charts)	7
Irish Independent Albums (IRMA)	1
Italian Albums (FIMI)	65
Japanese Albums (Oricon)	32
Japanese Digital Albums (Oricon)	45
Japanese Dance & Soul Albums (Oricon)	1
New Zealand Albums (RMNZ)	5
Norwegian Physical Albums (IFPI Norge)	5
Polish Albums (ZPAV)	13
Portuguese Albums (AFP)	72
Scottish Albums (Official Charts)	2
Spanish Albums (Promusicae)	72
Swedish Albums (Sverigetopplistan)	30
Swiss Albums (Schweizer Hitparade)	7
UK Albums (Official Charts)	3
UK Dance Albums (Official Charts)	1
UK Independent Albums (Official Charts)	1
US Billboard 200	29
US Independent Albums (Billboard)	2
US Top Dance Albums (Billboard)	1
