= Geogaddi =

2002 studio album by Boards of Canada

Studio album by Boards of Canada
- Released: 18 February 2002
- Recorded: 1999–2001
- Studios: Hexagon Sun (Pentland Hills, Scotland)
- Genres: IDM; downtempo; psychedelia; hauntology; ambient
- Length: 66:06 (standard edition); 68:16 (Japanese releases)
- Labels: Warp; Vivid
- Producers: Marcus Eoin; Michael Sandison

Boards of Canada chronology
In a Beautiful Place Out in the Country (2000)	Geogaddi (2002)	The Campfire Headphase (2005)

Geogaddi is the second studio album by Scottish electronic music duo Boards of Canada, released on 18 February 2002 by Warp Records. The album marks a darker sound from the group's debut album Music Has the Right to Children (1998). Characterized by heavily manipulated samples, analog textures and extensive use of subliminal messaging and backmasking, Geogaddi has been noted for its cryptic and mysterious sound design. The album's themes draw on numerology, paganism, the occult and religious cults. The album was recorded between 1999 and 2001 at the group's Hexagon Sun studio in the Pentland Hills. Upon release, Geogaddi received widespread critical acclaim and was ranked among the best albums of 2002 by several publications. It has retrospectively been recognized as a defining work of intelligent dance music, with Pitchfork naming it the fifth-best album of the genre in 2017.

== Background and composition ==
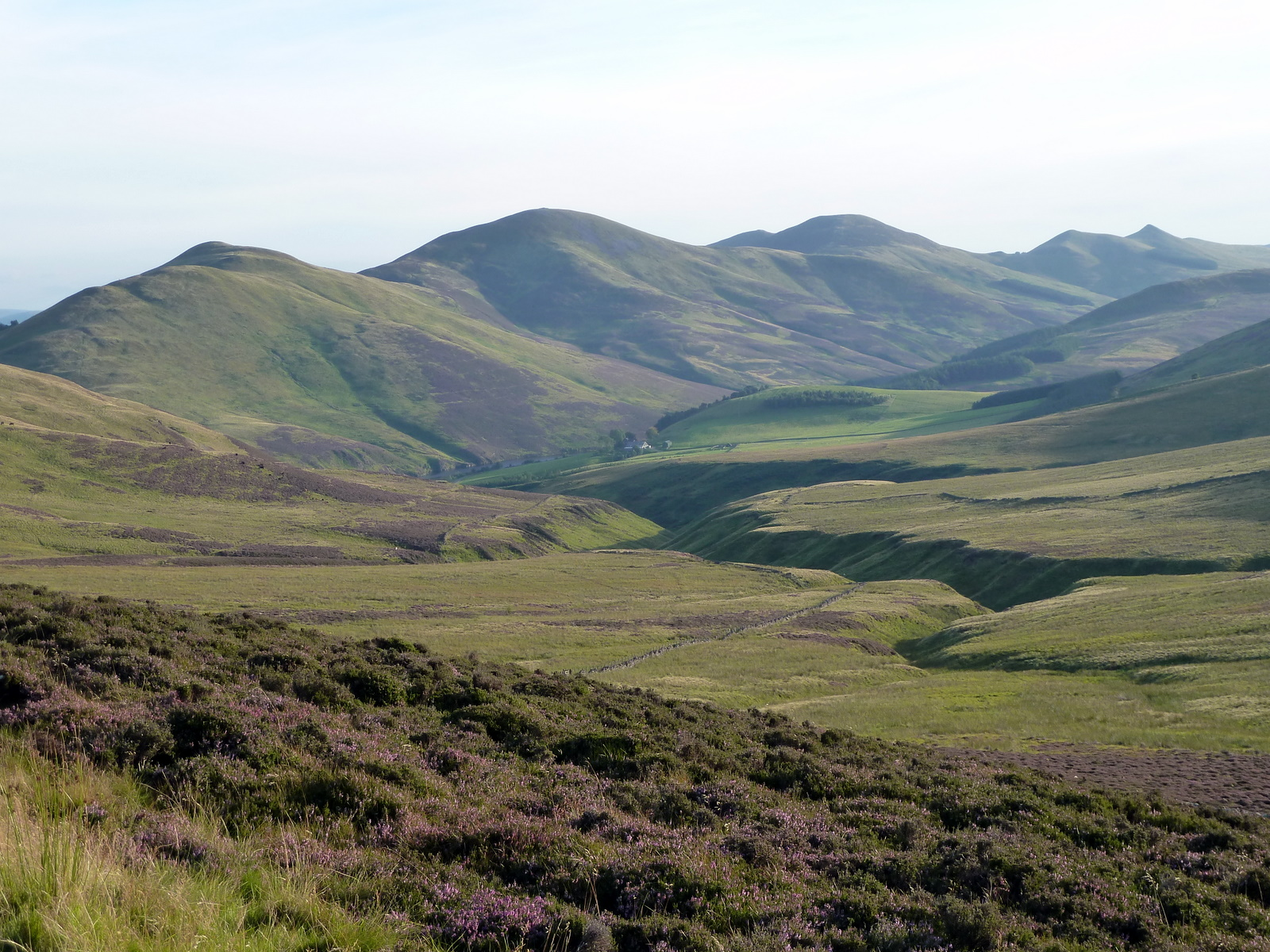
The album was recorded from 1999 to 2001 at Hexagon Sun, their Pentland Hills (pictured) studio.

Geogaddi is a psychedelic electronic album that has been categorized as IDM, downtempo, and hauntology, radically departing from the calmer and more subdued style of the duo's previous album, Music Has the Right to Children. Compared with their previous releases, Boards of Canada aimed to create a "huge psychedelic behemoth" with Geogaddi, containing "more facets, more detail and a kind of concentrated recipe of chaotic little melodies", as well as a "more fuzzy and organic" sound with vocals and flutes. The duo recorded over 90 tracks for the project from 1999 to 2001 at Hexagon Sun, their Pentland Hills studio, ultimately choosing 22 based on how well they fit the intended atmosphere of the album. Michael Sandison, half of the duo, stated that the album features acoustic instrumentation that was significantly manipulated and processed, inspired by the traditional folk style of the Scottish musical group the Incredible String Band and the 1973 film The Wicker Man.

Sandison described the album as "a record for some sort of trial-by-fire, a claustrophobic, twisting journey that takes you into some pretty dark experiences before you reach the open air again." The September 11 attacks drastically influenced the tone of the album during its production in 2001, with the duo "glued to the TV for the whole day" and Sandison saying that they had subsequently been pushed "into making a darker record". Mark Richardson of Pitchfork wrote that "the atmosphere on this album is a shade darker than on previous releases, and comparatively tense with a noticeable thread of paranoia." The album has been noted for featuring esoteric references, samples and subliminal messages, including references to numerology, Wicca and the Branch Davidians. (Note: The track "1969" contains sampled quotations of David Koresh's name.) Boards of Canada have claimed that the album's title is made up of several words with a specific meaning, but left it up to the listener to interpret it.

== Release ==
Warp did not distribute promotional copies for Geogaddi to music journalists, and instead—based on a concept the brothers had described—hosted two album listening events in churches. The album was first released by Vivid in Japan on 8 February 2002 and by Warp Records on 18 February 2002 in Europe. The album has been released on compact disc, vinyl, digital download and as a limited edition compact disc. The Japanese release of the album, released by Beat Records, contain a bonus track entitled "From One Source All Things Depend".

== Reception ==
Professional ratings
Aggregate scores
Source	Rating
Metacritic	84/100
Review scores
Source	Rating
AllMusic	4.5/5 stars
The Boston Phoenix	3/4 stars
Entertainment Weekly	B+
The Guardian	4/5 stars
NME	9/10
Pitchfork	8.6/10
Q	4/5 stars
Rolling Stone	3/5 stars
Spin	8/10
Uncut	5/5 stars

Geogaddi received critical acclaim upon release. It currently holds a score of 84 out of 100 from review aggregate site Metacritic based on 21 critics' reviews, indicating "universal acclaim". John Bush of AllMusic drew comparisons between the album and Music Has the Right to Children, including both albums' cover art. He also praised the use of samples, as he felt that it fit the tone of the album. Critics at Q compared Geogaddi to the album Drukqs by Aphex Twin, saying that it was "satisfying in every way that Aphex Twin's Drukqs wasn't".

Pat Blashill of Rolling Stone gave the album 3 stars out of 5, calling it "marvelously vague". A later review of the album on the Rolling Stone Album Guide gave it 2 stars out of 5, writing, "the contrast of evil undertones and electronic lullabies simply wasn't as compelling." Kitty Empire of NME named it "the electronic album of the year." Mark Richardson of Pitchfork wrote: "While some will complain about Boards of Canada's failure to cover new territory, [...] the rest of us will delight in what we see as a very accomplished album packed with great music."

Geogaddi was ranked on year-end lists of the best albums of 2002 by numerous publications, such as Mojo, NME, Uncut and The Wire. In 2017, Pitchfork placed Geogaddi at number five on its list of "The 50 Best IDM Albums of All Time". It peaked at number 3 on the Billboard Top Dance/Electronic Albums chart.

== Track listing ==
All tracks are written by Boards of Canada.

Geogaddi track listing
No.	Title	Length
1.	"Ready Lets Go"	0:59
2.	"Music Is Math"	5:22
3.	"Beware the Friendly Stranger"	0:38
4.	"Gyroscope"	3:35
5.	"Dandelion"	1:15
6.	"Sunshine Recorder"	6:13
7.	"In the Annexe"	1:22
8.	"Julie and Candy"	5:30
9.	"The Smallest Weird Number"	1:17
10.	"1969"	4:20
11.	"Energy Warning"	0:35
12.	"The Beach at Redpoint"	4:19
13.	"Opening the Mouth"	1:12
14.	"Alpha and Omega"	7:03
15.	"I Saw Drones"	0:27
16.	"The Devil Is in the Details"	3:53
17.	"A Is to B as B Is to C"	1:41
18.	"Over the Horizon Radar"	1:09
19.	"Dawn Chorus"	3:56
20.	"Diving Station"	1:27
21.	"You Could Feel the Sky"	5:14
22.	"Corsair"	2:52
23.	"Magic Window"	1:47
Total length:		66:06

Japanese bonus track
No.	Title	Length
24.	"From One Source All Things Depend"	2:10
Total length:		68:16

== Personnel ==
Credits adapted from AllMusic.

Boards of Canada

- Marcus Eoin – production, artwork, photography
- Michael Sandison – production, artwork, photography

Additional personnel

- Peter Campbell – cover photograph

== Charts ==
2002 chart performance for Geogaddi
Chart (2002)	Peak position
French Albums (SNEP)	78
Irish Albums (IRMA)	28
Scottish Albums (Official Charts)	12
UK Albums (Official Charts)	21
UK Independent Albums (Official Charts)	3
US Heatseekers Albums (Billboard)	19
US Independent Albums (Billboard)	10
US Top Dance Albums (Billboard)	3

2026 chart performance for Geogaddi
Chart (2026)	Peak position
UK Dance Albums (Official Charts)	4

== Certifications ==
Certifications for Geogaddi
Region	Certification	Certified units/sales
United Kingdom (BPI)	Silver	60,000^{‡}
^{‡} Sales+streaming figures based on certification alone.
