= Pylonesque EP =

EP by christ.
- Released: 9 July 2002
- Recorded: Hyperact Studio, Edinburgh
- Genre: IDM
- Length: 32:47
- Label: Benbecula Records BEN016
- Producer: Christopher Alan Horne.

Christ. chronology
Yugo77 (1998)	Pylonesque EP (2002)	Metamorphic Reproduction Miracle (2003)

Professional ratings
Review scores
Source	Rating
Allmusic	3/5 stars

Pylonesque EP is an EP produced and created by christ. This album had the distinction of being christ.'s first proper album. Pylonesque EP was released on Benbecula Records.

== Track listing ==
1. "Dream of the Endless" – 5:31
2. "Arctica" – 1:43
3. "Spengly Bengly" – 4:48
4. "Pylonesque" – 3:13
5. "Perlandine Friday" – 6:08
6. "Fantastic Light" – 5:03
7. "Absolom (For Lucy)" – 6:21
