= Seeing and Doing =

EP by Christ.
- Released: 2005
- Genre: Electronica
- Label: Benbecula
- Producer: Liquid Chris H

Christ. chronology
Metamorphic Reproduction Miracle (2003)	Seeing and Doing (2005)	Vernor Vinge (2006)

Professional ratings
Review scores
Source	Rating
Almost Cool	6/10
TinyMixTapes	5/5 marks

Seeing and Doing is a 2005 EP by Christ.

== Track listing ==
1. "Fragile X"
2. "Marsh of Epidemics"
3. "Magic Piano"
4. "Alter Boy"
5. "Marsh of Epidemics (Alias Remix)"
