= Christ. (musician) =

Scottish musician

christ.
- Also known as: Chris H.
- Born: Christopher Horne
- Origin: Balerno, Scotland
- Genres: Electronic
- Occupation: Musician
- Years active: Early 1990s - present
- Labels: Benbecula, Hyperact Records, Parallax Sounds

Christopher Horne, also known by his stage name christ., is a Scottish musician. He disclaims any religious meaning in the stage name; he describes it as short for his full name, and the full stop or period as indicating that status as an abbreviation.

christ. performs as a solo electronic music artist, and his music is often likened to that of the (also Scottish) electronic group Boards of Canada. In fact, credited as Chris H., he was an early participant in the nebulous Hexagon Sun collective from which Boards of Canada emerged, and was a collaborator with the group until approximately 1995. He appeared on the Twoism album as co-writer of the track "Melissa Juice", reissued by Warp in 2002 (his credits were removed from the reissue at his own request). Horne's departure was amicable and he thanks the duo on his Pylonesque EP issued on the Benbecula Records label in 2001. He followed this release with a full-length album Metamorphic Reproduction Miracle on the same label which was very well received within the genre.

christ. has toured the UK, Europe and Japan and performed a live session for John Peel in December 2003. This session became notable among Peel's fans as being the only known occasion upon which the DJ requested an encore. He released his fourth full-length album in January 2007 (after delays, due to manufacturing and marketing issues extending past the intended November 2006 date).

== Discography ==
=== Albums ===
- Delicass Harmonium (1996, Hyperact Records)
- Yugo 77 (1998, Hyperact Records)
- Metamorphic Reproduction Miracle (2003, Benbecula Records)
- Blue Shift Emissions (2007, Benbecula Records)
- Distance Lends Enchantment to the View (2009, Benbecula Records)
- Cathexis (Motion Picture Soundtrack) (2012, Parallax Sounds)
- curio. volume 1 (2014, Self-released)
- curio. volume 2 (2014, Self-released)
- curio. volume 3 (2014, Self-released)

=== EPs ===
- Pylonesque EP (2002, Benbecula Records)
- Seeing and Doing (2005, Benbecula Records)
- Vernor Vinge (2006, Benbecula Records)
- Bike (2007, Benbecula Records)

=== Live ===
- Live (2009, Benbecula Records)
- liveleventwelve (2013, Parallax Sounds)

==== Featured on ====
- Twoism by Boards of Canada (1995, featured as Chris H. as co-writer of "Melissa Juice", removed in 2002 Warp reissue at own request)

== See also ==
- List of ambient music artists
