= Introit / Prophecy at 1420 MHz =

Single by Boards of Canada

from the album Inferno
- Released: 7 May 2026
- Genre: IDM; new wave
- Length: 0:36 ("Introit"); 5:04 ("Prophecy at 1420 MHz")
- Label: Warp
- Songwriters: Michael Sandison ("Introit"); Michael Sandison and Marcus Eoin ("Prophecy")
- Producer: Sandison

Boards of Canada singles chronology
"Reach for the Dead" (2013)	"Introit / Prophecy at 1420 MHz" (2026)

"Introit / Prophecy at 1420 MHz" is a double A-side single released by Scottish electronic music duo Boards of Canada under the record label Warp on 7 May 2026. It is the lead single for the band's fifth studio album, Inferno (2026), their first in 13 years. A music video was released alongside the single. The single was generally praised by critics.

== Background and release ==
Inferno was initially teased in April 2026 via VHS tapes the band mailed to fans, as well as posters being put up in various cities. On 16 April, a music video entitled "Tape 05" was released, with the album's ultimate announcement being on 22 April. The first two tracks on the record, "Introit" and "Prophecy at 1420 MHz", were released as a split single along with a music video directed by Robert Beatty on 7 May 2026.

The name of the second track is a reference to the frequency of the 21-centimeter line, commonly associated with the search for extraterrestrial life and the Wow! signal.

== Reception ==
Max Pilley of NME praised both tracks, describing "Introit" as a mysterious prelude, with "spectral, retro-futurist scrambling synths" and "Prophecy at 1420 MHz" as a hypnotic, slow-building and ominous "head-nodder". They also noted the "muffled, mutated" vocals that "emerge from the static". Bill Pearis of BrooklynVegan had a similar opinion, stating that "Introit" is effectively a spacey ambience that flows into the second track, which they described as an engaging, upbeat, and distinctly Boards of Canada track.

Chris DeVille of Stereogum also praised the single, similarly describing it as ominous with its midtempo groove "straight out of a high-tech late '90s spy movie and even more ominous narration from a computerized voice." Moreover, they praised the track for continuing to evolve the band's sound, believing it not to sound like anything the band had done prior. Will Schube of Flood Magazine compared "Introit" to the works of Mort Garson and Prophecy as a notably haunting and murky "groover".

Alex Hudson of Exclaim! noted the second track began with that of a "woodwind playing an Arabic scale", before changing to a "new wave groove with chiming guitar arpeggios and what sounds like an acoustic drum kit." Overall, they praise the track for not sticking to one sound and continuing to veer into new territory, noting that the track slowly veers into a dark and more abstract sound. They described the track as a blend of IDM and "something resembling rock".

== Track listing ==
Digital download

1. "Introit" – 0:36
2. "Prophecy at 1420 MHz" – 5:04
