= Hi Scores =

EP by Boards of Canada
- Released: December 1, 1996
- Recorded: 1996
- Studio: Hexagon Sun
- Genre: IDM
- Length: 33:33
- Label: Skam
- Producers: Mike Sandison; Marcus Eoin

Boards of Canada chronology
Twoism (1995)	Hi Scores (1996)	Aquarius (1998)

Professional ratings
Review scores
Source	Rating
AllMusic	4/5 stars
Exclaim!	9/10
Pitchfork	8.7/10

Hi Scores is an EP by Scottish electronic music duo Boards of Canada. Their first wide release, the EP was released by Skam Records in 1996. "Seeya Later" previously appeared on the self-released EP Twoism. "Turquoise Hexagon Sun" would later appear on the duo's 1998 debut full-length album, Music Has the Right to Children.

The EP peaked at number 34 on the UK Dance Albums Chart in 2006. In 2014, Hi Scores was remastered from the original tapes and reissued in vinyl, CD, and digital formats. In 2026, Warp announced that the EP would be reissued on vinyl for the release’s 30 year anniversary.

== Track listing ==
No.	Title	Length
1.	"Hi Scores"	4:57
2.	"Turquoise Hexagon Sun"	5:09
3.	"Nlogax"	6:54
4.	"June 9th"	5:18
5.	"Seeya Later"	4:12
6.	"Everything You Do Is a Balloon"	7:03
Total length:		33:33

== Personnel ==
Credits adapted from liner notes.

- Mike Sandison – writing, production
- Marcus Eoin – writing, production

== Charts ==
2002 chart performance for Hi Scores
Chart (2002)	Peak position
UK Independent Albums (Official Charts)	43

2006 chart performance for Hi Scores
Chart (2006)	Peak position
UK Dance Albums (Official Charts)	34

2014 chart performance for Hi Scores
Chart (2014)	Peak position
Scottish Albums (Official Charts)	82
UK Physical Albums (Official Charts)	80
UK Independent Albums (Official Charts)	24

2026 chart performance for Hi Scores
Chart (2026)	Peak position
UK Album Downloads (Official Charts)	40
UK Dance Albums (Official Charts)	33
