= Trans Canada Highway (EP) =

EP by Boards of Canada
- Released: 29 May 2006
- Studios: Hexagon Sun, Scotland
- Genres: Electronic; ambient; IDM
- Length: 28:00
- Labels: Warp; music70
- Producers: Mike Sandison; Marcus Eoin; D. Philip Madson

Boards of Canada chronology
The Campfire Headphase (2005)	Trans Canada Highway (2006)	Tomorrow's Harvest (2013)

Professional ratings
Review scores
Source	Rating
AllMusic	3.5/5 stars
Pitchfork	6.0/10
Resident Advisor	3.5/5

Trans Canada Highway is an EP by Scottish electronic music duo Boards of Canada. Originally scheduled for release on 6 June 2006, it was published by Warp on 29 May 2006. The album peaked at number 63 on the UK Albums Chart.

== Music videos ==
The opening track, "Dayvan Cowboy", also appeared on the duo's album The Campfire Headphase. Melissa Olson directed the music video for the track. The video pieces together stock footage of Joseph Kittinger's high-altitude parachute jumps for Project Excelsior and stock footage of surfer Laird Hamilton riding waves. In 2009, Pitchfork placed it at number 39 on their list of the "Top 50 Music Videos of the 2000s".

== Covers ==
In 2011, Solange Knowles released a version of the track "Left Side Drive" with additional vocals. Knowles stated, "It's completely unofficial, and was just inspired by the song which I had a deep love affair with for years".

== Track listing ==
All tracks are written by Mike Sandison and Marcus Eoin.

No.	Title	Length
1.	"Dayvan Cowboy"	5:01
2.	"Left Side Drive"	5:20
3.	"Heard from Telegraph Lines"	1:09
4.	"Skyliner"	5:40
5.	"Under the Coke Sign"	1:31
6.	"Dayvan Cowboy (Odd Nosdam Remix)"	9:19
Total length:		24:00

== Personnel ==
Credits adapted from liner notes.

- Mike Sandison – composition, performance, production (except track 6)
- Marcus Eoin – composition, performance, production (except track 6)
- D. Philip Madson – production (on track 6)
- Dee Kesler – strings (on track 6)
- Antonio Trecel Diaz – tape (on track 6)
- Boards of Canada – artwork, design

== Charts ==
Chart performance for Trans Canada Highway
Chart (2006)	Peak position
Scottish Albums (Official Charts)	64
UK Albums (Official Charts)	63
UK Dance Albums (Official Charts)	8
UK Independent Albums (Official Charts)	4
US Top Dance Albums (Billboard)	12
