= Twoism =

EP by Boards of Canada
- Released: 15 August 1995
- Recorded: 1995
- Studios: Hexagon Sun, Pentland Hills
- Genres: Trip hop; downtempo; ambient
- Length: 36:45
- Labels: Music70; Warp
- Producers: Michael Sandison; Marcus Eoin

Boards of Canada chronology
Twoism (1995)	Hi Scores (1996)

Professional ratings
Review scores
Source	Rating
AllMusic	4/5 stars
Blender	4/5 stars
Drowned in Sound	8/10
Pitchfork	7.0/10

Twoism is the debut EP by Scottish electronic duo Boards of Canada, released through their own Music70 label in August 1995 as a limited run of approximately 100 copies.

The EP was out of print until it was re-issued by Warp Records on November 25, 2002.

== Background ==
The EP was initially pressed by Boards of Canada's own Music70 label on cassette and vinyl in 1995.

Before Twoism was re-pressed in 2002, it was a highly sought-after item, being pressed in an edition of approximately 100 copies. It would often be exchanged from one person to the next for up to £800 (2001) (equivalent to £1,430.23 or US$1,827.97 in 2024).

Twoism is the only widely available Boards of Canada release with early third member Chris Horne, who was credited (as Chris H.) on the original release. However, his name was omitted on the 2002 Warp re-released version at his own request. According to credits from Canadian Musical Reproduction Rights Agency he only co-wrote "Melissa Juice".

== Content ==
There are differences between "Sixtyniner" on this EP and other releases, as Boards of Canada have often re-released early songs on later, more popular releases, sometimes with changes. On the original Music70 pressing of the record, "Sixtyniner" lasted 5:40, while reissues shortened it to 5:14.

The channels are reversed on the CD reissue compared to the original vinyl EP. This can also be noted on the tracks "Seeya Later" and "Smokes Quantity", which have the channels reversed compared to their appearances on Hi Scores and Music Has the Right to Children respectively.

"Smokes Quantity" includes the hidden track "1986 Summer Fire" at the end. On some pressings, the two tracks are combined.

=== Artwork ===
The album cover is taken from the 1980 film The Killings at Outpost Zeta.

The first pressing of the CD from Warp Records was on a black CD, similar to original PlayStation discs, and included a sticker with the yellow Boards of Canada logo on it. The barcode on the CD's digipack was also an easily removable sticker.

== Reception ==
Andy Beta of Pitchfork wrote that the EP features "prescient, beanie-nodding beats", highlighting the complexity of certain tracks like "Basefree," with its "surging bass throb" and "intense hyper-beat." However, he notes limitations due to the cassette-only format, with some tracks having "distorted and fuzzy" elements, "muddying the overall effect."

AllMusic said of the reissue, "excepting only the rigid drum monster 'Basefree' (which sounds a bit like Aphex Twin circa 1992), Twoism features the same exquisitely spooky, textured emotronica that fans will want to hear, all at as high a level as the brilliant Music Has the Right to Children to boot."

Benjamin Bland, writing for Drowned in Sound, describes the EP as a "charming" and "youthful" record consisting of eight tracks of "ambient techno" showcasing the band's early musical vision. He notes that the EP is a "sonically incomplete" yet fascinating glimpse into Boards of Canada's early style, shedding light on their musical evolution over time.

== Track listing ==
All tracks written by Michael Sandison and Marcus Eoin, except "Melissa Juice" co-written by Chris Horne.

No.	Title	Length
1.	"Sixtyniner"	5:40
2.	"Oirectine"	5:11
3.	"Iced Cooly"	2:22
4.	"Basefree"	6:35
5.	"Twoism"	6:06
6.	"Seeya Later"	4:33
7.	"Melissa Juice"	1:32
8.	"Smokes Quantity"	3:10
9.	"1986 Summer Fire" (hidden track)	1:36
Total length:		36:45

== Credits ==
- Michael Sandison – production, photography
- Marcus Eoin – production
- Chris Horne – production

== Charts ==
Chart performance for Twoism
Chart (2026)	Peak position
UK Dance Albums (Official Charts)	16
