= Chiller Cabinet =

British radio show

Chiller Cabinet was a British radio show featuring ambient music hosted by Ben Eshmade on Classic FM. It aired during the graveyard slot between two and four in the morning.

The show blended continuously without voiceovers, and attracted a cult following.

The Chiller Cabinet released a compilation CD called Chiller Cabinet on 27 January 2004.
