= The Campfire Headphase =

2005 studio album by Boards of Canada

Studio album by Boards of Canada
- Released: 17 October 2005
- Recorded: 2003 – 2005
- Studios: Hexagon Sun (Pentland Hills, Scotland)
- Length: 61:58, 66:55 (Japanese)
- Labels: Warp; music70
- Producers: Michael Sandison; Marcus Eoin

Boards of Canada chronology
Geogaddi (2002)	The Campfire Headphase (2005)	Trans Canada Highway (2006)

Singles from The Campfire Headphase
- 1. "Oscar See Through Red Eye" Released: September 5, 2005; 2. "Dayvan Cowboy" Released: October 4, 2005

The Campfire Headphase is the third studio album by Scottish electronic music duo Boards of Canada. It was released on 17 October 2005 by Warp Records. Unlike previous albums from the duo, The Campfire Headphase features the addition of more organic musical elements, including heavily treated acoustic guitars and more conventional song structures. It received generally positive reviews from critics, and reached number 41 on the UK albums chart.

== Background ==
The duo began recording sketches for the album as early as 2002, but did not work on the project in earnest until 2004. According to Michael Sandison, compared with their previous releases, they aimed to "simultaneously shift and reduce the sound palette, making it more like a conventional band gone over the edge." This resulted in the presence of fewer samples, vocals, and cryptic references in favor of organic instrumentation. Regarding their process, Sandison stated that:

We usually imagine our music to have a visual element while we're writing it, so we were picturing this character losing his mind at the campfire and compressing weeks of events into a few hours, in that time-stretching way that acid fucks with your perception.

The duo avoided effects units and computer programming when possible, preferring to manipulate hardware sounds through direct modifications and EQing.

== Release ==
The track "Oscar See Through Red Eye" was released digitally on 5 September 2005 on Warp's webstore, Bleep. On 4 October 2005, the track "Dayvan Cowboy" was released through iTunes.

In April 2006, a music video for the song "Dayvan Cowboy" was released on the Warp Records website. The video consists of footage from Joe Kittinger's famous parachute jump from 19.5 miles' (31.4 km) altitude, and later slow-motion footage of big-wave surfer Laird Hamilton. The video was directed by Melissa Olson.

== Reception ==
Professional ratings
Aggregate scores
Source	Rating
Metacritic	79/100
Review scores
Source	Rating
AllMusic	3.5/5 stars
Entertainment Weekly	B−
The Guardian	3/5 stars
The Independent	4/5 stars
Mojo	4/5 stars
NME	7/10
The Observer	5/5 stars
Pitchfork	7.6/10
Q	4/5 stars
Uncut	4/5 stars

The album received generally positive reviews, receiving a rating of 79 out of 100 on aggregate website Metacritic. Mark Richardson of Pitchfork noted that the group's use of guitars "makes explicit something about the band's sound that was always just beneath the surface: the connection of the music to the pastoral tradition of British folk," but noted that "the best thing Campfire Headphase has going is its unnamable synthesizer sounds," and concluded that its "blissed-out narcotic interludes don't come quite often enough, though, and in fact this feels like a step down from the last two albums."

Simon Reynolds of The Observer wrote that "blurring the boundaries between rock and techno is a smart move, because BoC have always made music that deserved to appeal beyond the electronic audience", and praised "the stereophonic delirium of their production." In December 2005, American webzine Somewhere Cold ranked The Campfire Headphase No. 2 on their 2005 Somewhere Cold Awards Hall of Fame list.

== Track listing ==
All music is composed by Marcus Eoin and Mike Sandison.

No.	Title	Length
1.	"Into the Rainbow Vein"	0:44
2.	"Chromakey Dreamcoat"	5:47
3.	"Satellite Anthem Icarus"	6:04
4.	"Peacock Tail"	5:24
5.	"Dayvan Cowboy"	5:00
6.	"A Moment of Clarity"	0:51
7.	"'84 Pontiac Dream"	3:49
8.	"Sherbet Head"	2:41
9.	"Oscar See Through Red Eye"	5:08
10.	"Ataronchronon"	1:14
11.	"Hey Saturday Sun"	4:56
12.	"Constants Are Changing"	1:42
13.	"Slow This Bird Down"	6:09
14.	"Tears from the Compound Eye"	4:03
15.	"Farewell Fire"	8:26
Total length:		61:58

Japanese bonus track
No.	Title	Length
16.	"Macquarie Ridge"	4:57
Total length:		66:55

== Personnel ==
All personnel credits adapted from The Campfire Headphase's liner notes.

Boards of Canada

- Marcus Eoin – performer, producer
- Mike Sandison – performer, producer

Design personnel

- Boards of Canada – design
- Natasha Morton – design

== Charts ==
Chart performance for The Campfire Headphase
Chart (2005)	Peak position
Belgian Albums (Ultratop Flanders)	71
Dutch Albums (Album Top 100)	83
French Albums (SNEP)	86
Irish Albums (IRMA)	55
Norwegian Albums (VG-lista)	40
Scottish Albums (Official Charts)	24
UK Albums (Official Charts)	41
UK Dance Albums (Official Charts)	2
UK Independent Albums (Official Charts)	4
US Heatseekers Albums (Billboard)	5
US Independent Albums (Billboard)	19

The album was awarded a silver certification from the Independent Music Companies Association which indicated sales of at least 30,000 copies throughout Europe.
