= Music Has the Right to Children =

1998 studio album by Boards of Canada

Studio album by Boards of Canada
- Released: 20 April 1998
- Recorded: 1995 – 1997
- Studios: Hexagon Sun (Pentland Hills, Scotland)
- Genres: Electronic; downtempo; ambient; IDM; trip hop; psychedelia
- Length: 63:02 (Standard edition); 70:42 (US & UK rereleases); 79:46 (Japanese releases)
- Labels: Warp; Skam; music70; Matador
- Producers: Marcus Eoin; Michael Sandison

Boards of Canada chronology
Aquarius (1998)	Music Has the Right to Children (1998)	Peel Session (1999)

Singles from Music Has the Right to Children
- 1. "Aquarius" Released: January 5, 1998; 2. "Telephasic Workshop" / "Roygbiv" Released: 1998

Music Has the Right to Children is the debut studio album by Scottish electronic music duo Boards of Canada, released on 20 April 1998 in the United Kingdom by Warp and Skam Records and in the United States by Matador. The album was produced at Hexagon Sun, the duo's personal recording studio in Pentland Hills, and continued their distinctive style of electronica, featuring vintage synthesisers, degraded analogue production, found sounds and samples, and hip-hop-inspired rhythms that had been featured on their first two EPs Twoism (1995) and Hi Scores (1996).

The album received widespread acclaim upon its release, and has since been acknowledged as a landmark work in electronic music, going on to inspire a variety of subsequent artists. It has been included on various best-ever lists by publications such as Pitchfork and Mojo.

== Background ==
The members of Boards of Canada, brothers Michael Sandison and Marcus Eoin, had been creating music together as early as 1981, layering synths over cassette recordings of shortwave radio. Throughout the 1990s, the band were members of the Hexagon Sun artistic collective based in Pentland Hills, Scotland, and released self-produced cassettes produced in small quantities and given to friends and family members. According to Eoin, around 1987 or 1988, they started experimenting with tape demos they later destroyed. He called it the "seed of the project".

In 1996, the band completed their first wide release, the Hi Scores EP, and began sending it out for record labels to hear. Sean Booth of Autechre heard the EP, and suggested that the band get in touch with Skam Records, whose first release had been Booth's Lego Feet album in 1991. Skam released Hi Scores, and invited the band to produce a full-length follow-up. At the same time, the band established a relationship with Warp Records, who also wished to release an album by the band. As a compromise, the album would eventually be jointly released by both labels.

== Recording and production ==
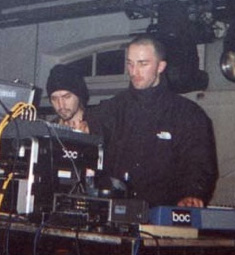
Marcus Eoin and Michael Sandison recorded the album entirely in their own studio in Pentland Hills.

The album was recorded in the duo's studio in Pentland Hills, which had been described as a "bunker" by various media publications. The duo described this as "just an exaggeration on the part of the record label" in an interview around the time of the album's release.

The album features the duo utilizing samplers, intentionally detuned vintage synthesizers, drum machines and reel to reel tape recorders. It also incorporates a wide variety of samples, including several from the children's television program Sesame Street in tracks such as "The Color of the Fire" and "Aquarius". The track "Happy Cycling" samples the sound of the red-legged seriema from Vangelis' score for the 1976 documentary La Fête sauvage.

During the production of the track "Rue the Whirl", the studio's window was left open, and the sound of birds was accidentally recorded into the track. The duo decided that the track was enhanced by the natural sounds, and left them in. "Smokes Quantity" first appeared on Twoism in 1995.

In interviews, the band has identified Devo, Wendy Carlos, DAF, TV and film soundtracks, Jeff Wayne, Julian Cope, My Bloody Valentine, 1980s pop music, and Seefeel as influences of the album's sound. According to Eoin, the band was uninterested in the styles of electronic music that were popular at the time of the album's creation, and that creating dance music was not a priority for them.

According to the band, the songs' titles contain "cryptic references that the listener might understand or might not," many of them personal to the band. For example, the album's title is a reference to the duo's "intention to affect the audience using sound". "Pete Standing Alone" shares its name with the main character of the documentary Circle of the Sun (1960) directed by Colin Low and released by the National Film Board of Canada.

== Music and lyrics ==
Sal Cinquemani of Slant Magazine stated that aesthetically, Music Has the Right to Children is "nestled somewhere in between the warm hues of 1970s flocked wallpaper and the sleek electronic sheen of the future lies." The track "The Color of the Fire" has been described as a "minimalist composition," drawing comparisons to the works of Brian Eno. The track contains a looped sample of a child's voice, which has been described as "disfigured [...] to form a creepy, somewhat detached, one-sided conversation." Jesse Dorris of Pitchfork said: "Boards of Canada coaxed breaks into motion as if excavating ancient rock formations while high on their own supply of hairy psych-rock samples (even Hair itself). It's nostalgic but not dissociative: The album's most idiosyncratic aspect are the wobbling voices that gurgle, 'I love you...' or 'There are a lot of different me's...' mostly summoned from 1970s North American public television, that ancient medium of collective meaning-making."

== Artwork and packaging ==
The album cover is a modified version of a family photo taken at Banff Springs in Alberta, Canada. Jesse Dorris of Pitchfork described it as "a grainy family photo, faces lost to time—or scrubbed from it." The original CD was released in a traditional jewel case, while the 2004 re-release was packaged in digipak format.

== Critical reception ==
Music Has the Right to Children was received positively by critics upon release. Writing for Manchester Evening News, critic Neil Davenport stated that it was "the best album you'll hear this year", and that it was a "landmark in the evolution of emotive electronica". Tucker Petertil of The Olympian wrote that although tracks on Music Has the Right to Children shared similar elements, each track had small differences in sound. In a review for the Daily Telegraph, Alexis Petridis stated that the album was "packed with warm, human, even witty material" and had "rare qualities".

James Delingpole of the Sunday Telegraph noted he enjoyed the album's "moody, edgy, weirdly beautiful ambient soundscapes". Ben Rayner of the Toronto Star ranked Music Has the Right to Children at number seven on his list of the ten best albums of 1998. In a piece for the Winnipeg Sun, critic Mark Perry gave the album three and a half stars, but called the album a "soothing, naturally textured world of warm synth tones, hip-hop beats and millisecond vocal snippets that warble and flit a bit like bird calls".

== Legacy ==
=== Retrospective reviews ===
Professional ratings
Review scores
Source	Rating
AllMusic	5/5 stars
Encyclopedia of Popular Music	4/5 stars
The Great Rock Discography	9/10
Muzik	8/10
NME	8/10
Pitchfork	10/10
The Rolling Stone Album Guide	4/5 stars
Select	4/5
Slant Magazine	4/5 stars
Spin	8/10

The album received widespread acclaim upon release. In 2014, AllMusic called it "a landmark for electronic listening music that was widely copied." Fact called it "an adult meditation on childhood, concerned with play, naïveté and nostalgia, all tinted with rosy pastoralism," but "also devilishly subtle, intricate and emotionally mature." Slant Magazine described the album as "nestled somewhere in between the warm hues of 1970s flocked wallpaper and the sleek electronic sheen of the future." Pitchfork stated that the duo "tapped into the collective unconscious of those who grew up in the English speaking West and were talented enough to transcribe the soundtrack."

The album has been included in several lists of greatest albums of all time. Music Has the Right to Children featured at number 26 on Pitchfork's "The 150 Best Albums of the 1990s" list. Staff writer Jesse Dorris wrote: "Decades on, Music remains mystical and deeply human, an uncanny valley rung with melodies drifting off all grids. It is folk music for people who use DATs instead of dobros. The faces might be mirrors." The album was also placed at number two on its "50 Best IDM Albums of All Time" list released in 2017. It was ranked number 91 in Mojo magazine's "100 Modern Classics" list. The album was also included in the book 1001 Albums You Must Hear Before You Die.

=== Influence ===
The album has been noted as a major influence on the electronic music genre. Fact magazine identified Lone, Gold Panda, Lapalux, Tim Hecker, Leyland Kirby, Bibio, Four Tet, and Ulrich Schnauss as musicians directly influenced by the album, calling it not "just a classic album or many people's personal favourite," but also "an artifact in its own lifetime, a present-day relic that recalls an innocent time in more ways than one."

== Track listing ==
All tracks are written by Marcus Eoin and Michael Sandison.

Music Has the Right to Children track listing
No.	Title	Length
1.	"Wildlife Analysis"	1:15
2.	"An Eagle in Your Mind"	6:25
3.	"The Color of the Fire"	1:45
4.	"Telephasic Workshop"	6:35
5.	"Triangles & Rhombuses"	1:50
6.	"Sixtyten"	5:48
7.	"Turquoise Hexagon Sun"	5:07
8.	"Kaini Industries"	0:59
9.	"Bocuma"	1:35
10.	"Roygbiv"	2:31
11.	"Rue the Whirl"	6:39
12.	"Aquarius"	5:58
13.	"Olson"	1:31
14.	"Pete Standing Alone"	6:07
15.	"Smokes Quantity"	3:07
16.	"Open the Light"	4:25
17.	"One Very Important Thought"	1:25
Total length:		63:02

Bonus track (1998 US & 2004 UK releases)
No.	Title	Length
18.	"Happy Cycling"	7:51
Total length:		70:42

Japanese bonus disc (Note: The tracks from this bonus disc were directly taken from the Boards of Canada Peel Session.)
No.	Title	Length
1.	"Aquarius (Version 3)"	6:22
2.	"Happy Cycling"	7:51
3.	"Olson (Version 3)"	2:31
Total length:		79:46

== Charts ==
1998 chart performance for Music Has the Right to Children
Chart (1998)	Peak position
UK Albums (Official Charts)	193
UK Independent Albums (Official Charts)	24

2026 chart performance for Music Has the Right to Children
Chart (2026)	Peak position
UK Dance Albums (Official Charts)	3

== Certifications ==
Certifications for Music Has the Right to Children
Region	Certification	Certified units/sales
United Kingdom (BPI)	Gold	100,000^{‡}
^{‡} Sales+streaming figures based on certification alone.
