= Boards of Canada =

Scottish electronic music duo

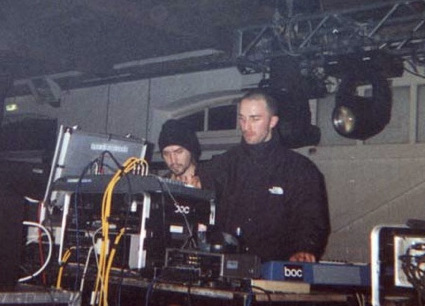
- Mike Sandison and Marcus Eoin performing in 2000

Background information
- Also known as: Hell Interface
- Origin: Cullen, Moray, Scotland
- Genres: Electronic; downtempo; IDM; psychedelia; folktronica; hauntology
- Works: Boards of Canada discography
- Years active: 1986–present
- Labels: Warp; Skam; Music70; V/Vm
- Members: Mike Sandison; Marcus Eoin
- Past members: Chris Horne
- Website: boardsofcanada.com
- Logo

Boards of Canada are a Scottish electronic music duo consisting of brothers Mike Sandison and Marcus Eoin, active since 1986. Their work is largely influenced by 1970s public broadcasting media, incorporating vintage synthesiser tones, analog equipment, samples, and hip-hop-inspired beats. Critics have described their music as exploring themes related to nostalgia, childhood memory, science, spirituality, and environmental concerns.

After releasing several early EPs, the group signed to Warp Records in 1998 and released their debut album Music Has the Right to Children to widespread critical acclaim; it is now considered a landmark album in electronic music. This was followed by their second studio album Geogaddi (2002), which adopted a darker tone and references to religious cults and esoteric subjects. Their third studio album The Campfire Headphase (2005), emphasized more organic instrumentation and conventional song structures. After a seven-year hiatus, the duo returned in 2013 with their fourth studio album Tomorrow's Harvest, which drew inspiration from film scores. Following another hiatus, this time lasting 13 years, they released their fifth studio album, Inferno, in 2026.

Boards of Canada have been regarded as "one of the best-known and best-loved electronic acts" of their era. They are credited as a pioneering group in the intelligent dance music (IDM) and hauntology movements. The duo have been described as cryptic and reclusive; they have made extensive use of subliminal messaging and unconventional promotional methods, and rarely grant interviews or appear publicly, having not performed live since 2001.

== History ==
=== Early years (1986–1996) ===
Brothers Mike Sandison (born Michael Peter Sandison, 14 July 1971) and Marcus Eoin (born Marcus Eoin Sandison, 27 May 1973) were brought up in Cullen, Moray, on the northeast coast of Scotland. From 1979 to 1980, they lived in Calgary, Canada, while their father, who worked in construction, took part in the project to build the Saddledome. They spent their teenage years living in Balerno, right beside the Pentland Hills and attended Balerno Community High School. They attended the University of Edinburgh, where Michael studied English literature and Marcus studied artificial intelligence. Marcus dropped out before completing his degree. The duo did not reveal that they were brothers until a 2005 interview with Pitchfork, as they had wanted to avoid comparisons with another electronic sibling duo, Orbital.

Growing up in a musical family, the brothers first played instruments at a young age. They experimented with recording techniques from around the age of 10, using tape machines to layer cut-up samples of found sounds over compositions of their own. In their teens they participated in a number of amateur bands. However, it was not until 1986 when Marcus was invited to join Mike's band as a bassist that Boards of Canada was born. The band's name was inspired by the National Film Board of Canada (NFB), the government agency whose award-winning documentary films and animation they had watched as children. With frequent line-up changes, Boards of Canada eventually had comprised as many as fourteen different members.

Their first known release was Catalog 3, in 1987 on cassette tape, on the brothers' own label, Music70, while Boards of Canada was still a band (it was later re-pressed in 1997 on CD on the same label). By 1989, the band had been reduced to three core members, Mike, Marcus and Chris Horne. Later in 1989, the band released Acid Memories. Both albums have only been heard by the band's friends and family, except for a 24-second excerpt of "Duffy", released on the EHX website in the late 1990s. Acid Memories is the only early album the brothers have mentioned in interviews. With various collaborators, Mike, Marcus and Chris created their own studio. The trio began performing on occasional outdoor happenings, playing tapes of different recordings including television themes with reversed vocal messages mixed over the music, combining it with visual media, using projections, films and monitors.

From 1992 to 1994, Boards of Canada participated in different small musical and visual projects, while the band's collective "Hexagon Sun" began regular "Redmoon" nights at a ruin near their own studio in Scotland. In the summer of 1995 the band and their friends officially named their studio in the Pentland Hills “Hexagon Sun”, and the collective have continued their work on recordings, films and gatherings from this location. Since that time every year in the spring and summer Hexagon Sun hosted various small rural music gatherings.

During that time, Boards of Canada released Play By Numbers and Hooper Bay, both in 1994, which, similarly to Acid Memories, were only released to friends and family and had sub-1 minute excerpts of two songs ("Wouldn't You Like To Be Free" from Play By Numbers and "Circle" from Hooper Bay) released from both albums on the EHX website.

Boards of Canada self-financed the limited release of the Twoism in August 1995, which became the bands first public release, available outside the band's own circle of friends. Later, in early 1996, Chris Horne departed, and Boards of Canada became a duo of brothers Mike Sandison and Marcus Eoin.

Some time later, after a copy of Twoism was sent to Sean Booth of Autechre, Booth suggested the remaining duo contacting Skam Records, leading to the release of Hi Scores in 1996 on the label. In the same year of the release of Hi Scores, the duo released Boc Maxima through Music70 with limited distribution.

Boards of Canada brought their full live show including Super-8 and video visuals when they played alongside Autechre, Panasonic and Cylob in London in July 1996.

=== Music Has the Right to Children (1996–2002) ===
Between 1995 and 1997, the duo started recording what would become their debut studio album, Music Has the Right to Children, released in April 1998. The album was joint-released by both Skam Records and Warp Records. The cover of the album is a family photo that was taken at a scenic lookout on Mt. Norquay Road overlooking downtown Banff, Alberta, with each person's face digitally removed. The album consists of longer tracks mixed with song vignettes. It also includes one of the duo's most popular songs, "Roygbiv". Music Has the Right to Children received widespread acclaim upon release, with it being featured at No. 35 on Pitchfork's "Top 100 Albums of the 1990s" list.

=== Geogaddi and The Campfire Headphase (2002–2009) ===
The duo began recording their next album, Geogaddi, between 1999 and 2001. The cover art features a figure framed to appear horned and taller than a group of trees. Additional promotional artwork for the album, taken by Hexagon Sun photographer Peter Campbell, uses the same kaleidoscope effect. It was described by Sandison as "a record for some sort of trial-by-fire, a claustrophobic, twisting journey that takes you into some pretty dark experiences before you reach the open air again". Geogaddi was officially released by Vivid on 8 January 2002 in Japan, and by Warp Records on 18 February 2002 in Europe. Critics noted a shift in mood within Geogaddi; Mark Richardson of Pitchfork commented that "the atmosphere on this album is a shade darker than on previous releases, and comparatively tense with a noticeable thread of paranoia". It was later noted by the duo that the album was a response to the September 11 attacks.

As early as 2002, the duo began working on sketches for their next studio album, The Campfire Headphase, however studio work didn't begin until 2004. After releasing two singles from the album exclusively onto Bleep, and a music video for the track "Dayvan Cowboy", The Campfire Headphase was released on 17 October 2005. When writing about the album for The Observer, Simon Reynolds noted that "blurring the boundaries between rock and techno is a smart move, because BoC have always made music that deserved to appeal beyond the electronic audience", and praised "the stereophonic delirium of their production".

=== Tomorrow's Harvest (2013) ===
After the release of their previous studio album and an EP named Trans Canada Highway, Eoin and Sandison "took some time out, and spent some time travelling". The two also expanded their recording studio at Hexagon Sun, which is near the Pentland Hills in Scotland. In February 2012, a BBC Radio personality noted that a new album from Boards of Canada was "on the way".

On Record Store Day 2013, a vinyl record containing a short clip of music and a distorted voice speaking a six digit code, which was believed to be the work of Boards of Canada, surfaced at the New York record store Other Music. Shortly after the release, Warp Records vouched for the record's authenticity.

Other codes were hidden through various websites and online communities, as well as being broadcast over BBC Radio One, NPR, and Adult Swim. After much speculation, the official website for the band redirected users to another website which prompted the user to enter a password. Once all six unique codes were entered, a video was shown announcing Tomorrow's Harvest, their fourth studio album. The website showed the cover art, the month and year of release and a short snippet of music. The album was released on 5 June 2013 in Japan, 10 June 2013 in Europe, and 11 June 2013 in the United States to widespread critical acclaim.

=== Remixes, WXAXRXP and Inferno (2016–present) ===
In 2016, Boards of Canada released two remixes. The first, a remix of Nevermen's "Mr Mistake", was released on 12 January 2016, and was followed shortly after by a remix of "Sisters" by Odd Nosdam on 22 February 2016. On 17 February 2017, an instrumental version of the "Mr Mistake" remix was released. On 29 July 2017, Boards of Canada released a remix of "Sometimes" by The Sexual Objects.

In 2019, Warp Records kicked off the celebrations for its 30th anniversary, titled WXAXRXP, with a 100-hour takeover of online radio station NTS Radio, featuring mixes, radio shows, and unreleased music from a number of artists on the label's roster. This included a 2-hour mixtape from Boards of Canada titled Societas X Tape, aired on 23 June 2019 at 9:00 PM BST, and featured music from other artists such as Grace Jones, Devo and Yellow Magic Orchestra, spliced with spoken word samples and music that is rumoured to be unreleased work from the group itself. On July 3, 2021, Boards of Canada released a remix of a second Nevermen song, "Treat Em Right".

In early April 2026, unsolicited VHS cassettes were mailed to physical addresses that had previously made purchases from Boards of Canada's longtime record label Warp Records. The tapes contained stylized vintage visuals similar to the aesthetics of previous Boards of Canada releases. On 16 April, Boards of Canada shared a video entitled "Tape 05", set to a then-untitled track which was their first original piece of music released in thirteen years.

The following month, on 29 May 2026, Boards of Canada released their fifth studio album, Inferno. It was promoted with the singles "Introit" and "Prophecy At 1420 MHz".

== Artistry ==
=== Style and methods ===
The music of Boards of Canada has been described by AllMusic as "evocative, mournful, sample-laden downtempo music often sounding as though produced on malfunctioning equipment excavated from the ruins of an early-'70s computer lab". Inverted Audio summed their work as "a mixture of heady trip-hop beats, richly textured ambience and glittering synth melodies [...]; nostalgic and otherworldly, playful yet frightening". Critic Simon Reynolds described their style as "a hazy sound of smeared synth-tones and analog-decayed production, carried by patient, sleepwalking beats, and aching with nostalgia" while crediting them with "reinvent[ing]" elements of psychedelia through the deliberate misuse of technology. They have additionally been referred to as a folktronica act for their incorporation of acoustic sounds. They have also been described as "icons" of the intelligent dance music" (IDM) movement.

To achieve their evocative and "worn down" sound, the duo have made use of outdated brands of recording equipment, such as tape machines manufactured by Grundig. They also make use of samples from 1970s television shows and other media prevalent in the era of the brothers' shared childhood, especially the nature-inspired documentaries and educational films produced by the National Film Board of Canada. The distinctive result is a product of their use of analogue equipment, mix of electronic and conventional instrumentation, use of distorted samples, and their layering and blending of these elements. Brief interludes or vignettes feature prominently in the duo's music; Sandison has said that "we write far more of [these] than the so-called 'full-on' tracks, and, in a way, they are our own favourites". Boards of Canada have written an enormous number of such fragments; for instance, Geogaddi allegedly involved the creation of 400 song fragments and 64 complete songs, of which 22 were selected. Eoin has said about the duo's discography that "the idea of the perfect album is this amorphous thing that we're always aiming at […] the whole point of making music is at least to aim at your own idea of perfection".

=== Themes ===
The duo's preoccupation with memory, nostalgia, past aesthetics, and public broadcasting presaged the 2000s electronic movement known as hauntology. Theorist and music critic Adam Harper described their work as "a simultaneously Arcadian and sinister musical hauntology based on cut-up samples, vintage synthesiser technology and a faded modernism arising from mid-twentieth-century television, science, public education, childhood and spirituality". Journalist Joseph Morpurgo argued that the group "did more than anyone else to codify the way in which contemporary listeners understand nostalgia. Their memories have became our memories". According to Sandison, the duo's music is rooted in "retrieving and exploring memories of the past, including the decay and emotional texture that are added to them as time progresses".

The duo have expressed interest in themes of subliminal messaging, and subsequently their work has incorporated cryptic messages, including references to numerology, Satanism and cult figures such as David Koresh of the Branch Davidians. When questioned about their aims in making such references, Boards of Canada have expressed themselves in neutral terms (saying "We're not religious at all [...] and if we're spiritual at all it's purely in the sense of caring about art and inspiring people with ideas".) while remaining fascinated with the ability of music to influence the minds of others (saying, with irony, that "[We] do actually believe that there are powers in music that are almost supernatural. I think you actually manipulate people with music"...).

=== Influences ===
Interviews with the Sandison brothers have named several acts that influence their work including Joni Mitchell, the Incredible String Band (saying "we have all the String Band records […] our rural sensibilities are similar"), the Beatles (saying "[they] really became enthralling to us through their psychedelism") and My Bloody Valentine (saying "even if we don't sound like them, there's a connection in terms of the approach to music"). They have also named Meat Beat Manifesto as a chief influence, citing their synth sounds. They have expressed admiration for the Wu-Tang Clan, suggesting that producer RZA "listens like we do".

== In popular culture ==
The song "Beware the Friendly Stranger" from Geogaddi has been prominently featured in the Salad Fingers animated web series created by David Firth.

The song "Gyroscope" from Geogaddi was featured in the 2012 film Sinister.

In October 2025, Boards of Canada's track "Olson" from Music Has the Right to Children was programmed as a sequence of tones and played on the last operable and actively maintained Digital Equipment Corporation PDP-1 computer, which is displayed at the Computer History Museum of California.

The song "The Word Becomes Flesh" from Inferno was used in the credits for the 2026 film Backrooms, which released on the same day as Inferno.

== Members ==
=== Current members ===
- Mike Sandison – electronics, programming, keyboards, guitar, bass, strings, drums, percussion (1986–present)
- Marcus Eoin – bass guitar (1986–?), electronics, programming, keyboards (?–present)

=== Former members ===
- Chris Horne – electronics (?–1996)

According to a biography given in a Matador press release, Boards of Canada experienced frequent line-up changes between 1986 and 1989, with fourteen different unnamed members.

== Discography ==
Studio albums

- Music Has the Right to Children (1998)
- Geogaddi (2002)
- The Campfire Headphase (2005)
- Tomorrow's Harvest (2013)
- Inferno (2026)

== See also ==
- List of ambient music artists
- List of intelligent dance music artists
- List of Scottish musicians
