= Hexagon Sun =

Scottish artist collective

Hexagon Sun is an artistic collective based in the Pentland Hills, Scotland. The confirmed members are Mike Sandison, Marcus Eoin (the two forming electronic band Boards of Canada), Peter Iain Campbell (a.k.a. "PIC"), Simon Goderich (a.k.a. "goderich"), Mark David Garrett (a.k.a. "mdg"), Rachel Stewart, Alan Mackenzie, and Andrew Wilson.

The most well-known venture of the collective is the electronic music project Boards of Canada, of whom Eoin and Sandison are the sole members; Chris Horne was previously a member and departed amicably following the release of Twoism in 1995. The band has used the Hexagon Sun name for their recording studio and has released songs with the title "Turquoise Hexagon Sun" and "Orange Hexagon Sun"; the former has been featured on Boc Maxima, Hi Scores, and Music Has the Right to Children, and the latter on the bootleg Old Tunes, Vol. 2 tape.

Hexagon Sun's presence on the Internet has been limited to its website, hexagonsun.com, which — until 2005, when it was redirected to boardsofcanada.com — was simply a small graphic of mirrored turquoise-color text on a blue background. When reflected, the text reads "the internet is evil. wake up." In 2013, hexagonsun.com forwarded to cosecha-transmisiones.com (the URL translates from Spanish to "harvest transmissions"), a simple logon page made by Boards of Canada, that was used as part of the unveiling for the album Tomorrow's Harvest. If one is to look at the source code for the page of cosecha-transmisiones.com, the image of a hexagon in ASCII fashion is revealed.
