= List of people from Brighton and Hove =

This is a list of notable people born or inhabitants of the city of Brighton and Hove in England. This includes the once separate towns of Brighton and Hove.

Note that in the case of persons still living, they may not currently live within the area of the city, but have done so at some time.

For clarification: note the distinction between Kemptown and Kemp Town.

== Notable people ==
Name	Field	Notability	Connection with Brighton and Hove	Notes	Refs
Saunders Alexius Abbott	Military	Army officer in the East India Company	Died at Grand Avenue Mansions, Hove in 1894		
Tobi Adebayo-Rowling	Sport	Footballer for Peterborough United	Born in Brighton in 1996		
Steven Ades	Sport	Cricketer for Sussex	Born in Brighton in 1982		
Richard Addinsell	Entertainment	Composer of the Warsaw Concerto and many film soundtracks	Lived at Chichester Terrace, Kemp Town between 1960 and 1977	Commemorated by a blue plaque on his house	
William Addison	Science	Physician and Fellow of the Royal Society	Died in Brighton in 1881		
Lily Agg	Sport	Footballer	Born in Brighton in 1993		
Liz Aggiss	Arts/Entertainment	Choreographer, live artist, dance performer and film-maker	Lives in Brighton and is Emeritus Professor in Visual Performance at the University of Brighton		
William Harrison Ainsworth	Humanities	Historical novelist; his locally themed novels include Ovingdean Grange and Old Court, which mentions the Old Ship Hotel	Lived at 5 Arundel Terrace, Kemp Town between 1853 and 1867	Commemorated by a blue plaque on his house and by Brighton & Hove Bus Company bus number 423	
Paul Alborough	Entertainment	Hip hop and Grime musician	Lived in Brighton; now lives in Hove		
Chemmy Alcott	Sport	Formerly Britain's top alpine skier	Born in Hove in 1982		
Henry Alexander	Sport	Cricketer for Harrow School and Cambridge University	Born in Brighton in 1841		
Elizabeth Allan	Entertainment	Film actress	Lived at 3 Courtenay Terrace, Hove from 1977 until her death in 1990	Commemorated by a blue plaque on the block of flats and by Brighton & Hove Bus Company bus number 655	
Leighton Allen	Sport	Footballer for Colchester United	Born in Brighton in 1973		
Peter Allen	Sport	Footballer for Leyton Orient	Born in Brighton in 1946	Formerly a partner in Portslade solicitors firm Deibel & Allen (now retired)	
Henry Allingham	Other	Supercentenarian and formerly the world's oldest man	Moved to St Dunstan's care home at Ovingdean in 2006 aged 109; died there in 2009 aged 113	Commemorated by Brighton & Hove Bus Company bus number 808	
Fabienne André	Sport	Paralympic wheelchair racer	Born in Brighton in 1996		
Frank Anscombe	Education	Statistician and founder of Yale University's statistics department	Born in Hove in 1918		
Honor C. Appleton	Arts	Children's book illustrator	Born at 30 St Michael's Place, Montpelier, Brighton in 1879. Long-term resident of 3 Ventnor Villas, Hove.		
Norman Armour	Politics	American diplomat	Born in Brighton in 1887 while his parents were on holiday		
Herschel Lewis Austin	Politics	Businessman, WWII naval officer figure, politician and artist	Lived at 30 Dyke Hill Avenue, Died in Brighton in 1974	Born in Plymouth, raised in the East End of London, H.L. Austin was a Labour Member of Parliament in Manchester, 1945-1950	
William Austin	Arts	Artist, engraver and caricaturist	Died in Brighton in 1820		
William Waldorf Astor, 1st Viscount Astor	Politics	American attorney, politician, hotel founder and member of the Astor family	Lived at 155 Kings Road, Brighton until his death in 1919		
James Lloyd Ashbury	Politics	Yachtsman and Member of Parliament	Lived in Brighton		
David Baboulene	Humanities	Humorous travel writer, scriptwriter and story theory expert	Lives in Brighton and is based at the University of Brighton School of Education		
Walter Baddeley	Religion	Bishop of Melanesia 1932–1947	Born in Portslade and attended Varndean School	In 1962 the north aisle of St Andrew's Church, Portslade was redesigned to form a memorial to him	
Alfred Bader	Science	Research chemist and art collector	Evacuated to Hove in 1938 as part of the Kindertransport scheme; lived at 85 Holland Road and attended East Hove Senior School for Boys	Bader was a regular attendee at the Middle Street Synagogue, Brighton	
William A. Baillie-Hamilton	Politics	Scottish civil servant, barrister, military captain and footballer	Born in Brighton in 1844	Played for Scotland in its first ever football match against England	
John Roman Baker	Arts	Playwright and novelist (mostly with gay themes)	Born in Brighton and has lived there for much of his life		
Jack Ball	Sport	Footballer	Born and attended school in Brighton		
Zoë Ball	Entertainment	Broadcaster	Formerly lived at Western Esplanade on Hove seafront	Daughter of Johnny Ball	
David Bangs	Naturalist	Author	Writes about countryside around Brighton and lives in Brighton		
Howard Barker	Arts	Playwright	Has lived in Brighton since the 1980s		
Saffron Barker	Entertainment	YouTuber	Raised in Brighton and still lives there		
Victor Barker	Other	Transgender man who impersonated an RAF officer and joined the National Fascisti	Moved into the Grand Hotel in 1923	Married a woman at St Peter's Church, Brighton, in 1932	
Carol Barnes	Entertainment	ITV newsreader	Lived at Brighton Marina until her death in 2008	Commemorated by Brighton & Hove Bus Company bus number 701 and by The Argus newspaper's Carol Barnes Courageous Child of the Year Award	
Charles James Barnett	Sport	Cricketer for the M.C.C. and politician	Died in Brighton in 1882		
Alexandra Bastedo	Entertainment	Actress	Born in Hove in 1946 and attended Brighton and Hove School for Girls		
Bat for Lashes, real name Natasha Khan	Entertainment	Musician			
Darren Baxter	Sport	Footballer	Born in Brighton		
Pauline Baynes	Arts	Illustrator, notably of books by C.S. Lewis and Tolkien	Born in Brighton in 1922		
Ernest Frederick Beal	Military	Recipient of Victoria Cross in World War I	Born in Brighton in 1883, lived at East Street and Lewes Road, and attended Brighton Grammar School	Brighton's only Victoria Cross recipient in World War I; commemorated on Brighton War Memorial and by Brighton & Hove Bus Company bus number 626	
Aubrey Beardsley	Arts	Fin de siècle artist	Born at 31 Buckingham Road, West Hill in 1872; also lived at Lower Rock Gardens, Kemptown	Commemorated by a blue plaque at his birthplace and by Brighton & Hove Bus Company bus number 603	
Mabel Beardsley	Entertainment	Actress	Born in Brighton in 1871	Sister of Aubrey Beardsley	
Beardyman	Entertainment	Beatbox musician	Moved to Brighton in 2001 to study at the University of Sussex		
Ian Beck	Arts	Illustrator and author	Born in Brighton in 1947 and attended Brighton College of Art		
Brian Behan	Humanities	Writer, playwright and political activist	Lived in Brighton from 1990		
William Bemister	Entertainment	Documentary filmmaker	Born in Brighton in 1948		
Edna Best	Entertainment	Actress	Born in Hove in 1900		
Keith Best	Politics	Former Brighton Borough councillor and Member of Parliament for Anglesey	Born in Brighton in 1949 and attended Brighton College		
Robert Bevan	Arts	Artist	Born at 17 Brunswick Square, Hove in 1865		
Gordon Beves	Sport	South African cricket umpire	Born in Brighton in 1862		
L. B. Billinton	Industry	London, Brighton and South Coast Railway locomotive engineer and designer	Born in Brighton in 1882		
Birdengine	Entertainment	Freak folk singer-songwriter	Lives in Brighton		
Alma Birk (Baroness Birk)	Politics	Labour politician and journalist	Born at 10 Belgrave Place, Brighton in 1917		
Russell Bishop	Other	Sex offender	Born in Brighton in 1966	Assaulted and tried to murder a 7-year-old girl; and guilty of notorious Babes in the Wood murders in Wild Park, Moulsecoomb	
Clementina Black	Politics	Trades unionist, feminist and writer	Born in Brighton in 1854 and died there in 1922		
Denise Black	Entertainment	Actress who played Denise Osbourne in Coronation Street	Lives in Freshfield Road in Kemptown		
William Black	Humanities	Novelist	Lived at 1 Paston Place, Kemptown from 1879 until his death in 1898	Buried at St Margaret's Church, Rottingdean	
William Seymour Blackstone	Politics	Member of Parliament for Wallingford, Oxfordshire	Died in Brighton in 1881		
Howard Blake	Entertainment	Composer, pianist, conductor and lyricist	Grew up at 113 Preston Road, Brighton; attended Downs Junior School (1944–49) and Brighton Grammar School (1950–57)	Also a chorister at St Augustine's Church, Brighton	
Cate Blanchett	Entertainment	Actress	Lived in Brighton for several years in the mid-2000s		
Tony Bloom	Entertainment	Professional poker player and chairman of Brighton & Hove Albion F.C.	Born in Brighton in 1970		
Tom Blundell	Science	Biochemist	Born in Brighton in 1942		
Monster Bobby (Bobby Barry)	Entertainment	Musician; founded and played with The Pipettes	Born in Brighton in 1981		
Martin Bodenham	Sport	Football referee and cricket umpire	Born in Brighton in 1950		
Benji Boko	Entertainment	DJ and record producer		Born in Brighton	
Edward Booth	Science	Naturalist and taxidermist	Went to school in Brighton and lived there until his death in 1890	The building he constructed on Dyke Road in Prestonville to house his collection of specimens is now the Booth Museum of Natural History	
Frederick Booty	Arts	Artist, philatelist and author of world's first illustrated stamp catalogue	Lived in Brighton		
Jeffery Boswall	Science	Ornithologist and natural history producer for the BBC	Born in Brighton in 1931		
James Botting	Other	Hangman at Newgate Prison	Lived in Brighton; died in Hove in 1837		
Harvey Braban	Entertainment	Actor	Born in Brighton in 1883		
Charlie Bray	Sport	Cricketer for Essex	Born in Portslade in 1898	Bray later became a journalist	
Andrew Brewin	Politics	Canadian politician	Born in Brighton in 1907		
Frank Bridge	Arts	Composer	Born at 7 North Road, Brighton in 1879	Commemorated by Brighton & Hove Bus Company bus number 662	
Raymond Briggs	Arts	Writer, illustrator and artist	Taught at Brighton School of Art; died in Brighton		
Ray Brooks	Arts	Actor	Born in Brighton		
George Brown	Sport	Cricketer	Born in Brighton in 1821		
Janet Brown	Arts	Actress and impersonator of Margaret Thatcher	Lived in Hove		
Steve Brown	Sport	Footballer	Born in Brighton in 1972		

== B ==
- Adrian Brunel, film director in the silent movie era
- Isambard Kingdom Brunel, engineer, attended Dr Morell's school on Hove seafront, close to Hove Street, for several years from 1820
- Dora Bryan, comic actress (whose Clarges hotel on Marine Parade was used in the Carry On films)
- Margot Bryant, actress who played Minnie Caldwell in Coronation Street, lived at Fourth Avenue in Hove for many years
- Janey Buchan, Scottish Labour MEP, died in Brighton in 2012
- Arabella Buckley, writer and populariser of science, was born in Brighton in 1840
- Nick Burbridge, author of poetry, plays, novel; songwriter-founder of folk rock McDermott's Two Hours
- Richard Burchett, artist
- Julie Burchill, journalist; founder of Modern Review
- Rob Burley, television producer
- Sir Edward Burne-Jones, Pre-Raphaelite artist; resident 1880–98
- Sir John Cordy Burrows, surgeon and local politician; mayor of Brighton in 1857
- Keith Burstein, composer, born (1957) and brought up in Hove
- Steve Burtenshaw, football player (played for Brighton & Hove Albion), football manager and scout, born in Portslade in 1935
- Sean Bury, actor, was born in Brighton in 1954
- Charles Busby, Regency architect, prolific in Brighton; lived in Lansdowne Place; house is adorned by a blue commemorative plaque
- Cecil Butcher, cricketer for Sussex, born in Brighton in 1872, died in Portslade in 1929
- Dame Clara Butt, recitalist and concert singer, lived in St Aubyns Mansions between 1903 and 1906
- Douglas Byng, comic singer and songwriter; lived in Arundel Terrace, Kemp Town; died in 1987

== C ==
- Duncan Campbell, investigative journalist and computer forensics expert
- Victor Campbell, Antarctic explorer, born in Brighton in 1875
- Aimée Campton (1882-1930) English-French actress
- Marie-Antoine Carême, chef to the Prince Regent, inventor of chef's toque (hat)
- Charles Carpenter, cricketer for Sussex
- Edward Carpenter, poet and philosopher
- Denis Carter, Baron Carter, agriculturalist and Labour politician, spent some of his early life in Hove
- Sam Carter, singer in British metalcore band Architects
- Dirick Carver, Protestant martyr, 1554
- Juan Francisco Casas, Spanish artist, has lived in Brighton
- Michael Cashman, MEP and former EastEnders actor
- Gwen Catley, soprano, died in Hove in 1996
- Lennox Cato, expert on the Antiques Roadshow
- Nick Cave, Australian musician, writer, and film maker
- Gianni Celati, Italian writer, lives in Brighton
- Celeste, singer, grew up in Saltdean
- Paul Cemmick, cartoonist, lives in Hove
- Douglas Chamberlain, cardiologist, lives in Hove and worked at the Royal Sussex County Hospital for more than 20 years
- Ian Chapman, footballer
- Peter Chrisp, children's writer
- Gwendoline Christie, actress; attended Varndean College in Brighton and Hove
- Isaac Christie-Davies, footballer
- Sir Winston Churchill, journalist and politician; attended a school run by the "Misses Thompson" in Hove
- Louis Clark, footballer
- Adrian Clarke, underground poet of the British Poetry Revival, lives in Brighton
- Dave Clarke, techno DJ
- Somers Clarke, architect and Egyptologist, born in Brighton in 1841
- Jack Clayton, film director, was born in Brighton in 1921
- Brendan Cleary, poet, has lived in Brighton
- John Clements, actor
- Carol Cleveland, Monty Python actress
- Bryan Clough, author of State Secrets: The Kent-Wolkoff Affair
- Charles Clover-Brown, cricketer, died in Hove in 1982
- Brian Cobby, former voice of the British Telecom speaking clock
- C. B. Cochran, impresario, showman, born in Prestonville Road in the Prestonville area of Brighton in 1872
- Alex Cochrane, footballer
- Michael Cochrane, actor, born in Brighton in 1947
- Frankie Cocozza, singer, born in Brighton in 1993
- Admiral Sir Edward Codrington, hero of the Battle of Navarino; lived in 140 Western Road (1828–52); a blue commemorative plaque adorns the house
- Robert Coffin, Catholic Bishop of Southwark, born in Brighton in 1819
- Ben Cohen, author, publisher and distributor of bridge books and stationery supplies
- Martin Cohen, author and philosopher, born in Brighton in 1964.
- Sophie Coleman, triathlete, born in Brighton in 1990
- Jean Colin, 1930s film actress, was born in Brighton in 1905
- David Collings, actor (Crime and Punishment, Doctor Who), born in Brighton in 1940
- Geoffrey Collins, cricketer for Sussex, born in Brighton in 1918
- Henry Collins, artist, lived in Brighton
- Maria Colwell, born in Hove in 1965, killed in Brighton by her stepfather at age 7; a notorious case of child abuse resulting in a public enquiry
- John Comber, cricketer for Sussex, born in Brighton in 1861
- Ivy Compton-Burnett, novelist, grew up in Hove
- Dainton Connell, a leading Arsenal hooligan, was born in Brighton in 1961
- Clare Connor, played for Brighton College men's cricket team and England women's cricket team, was born in Brighton in 1976
- John Constable, Romantic painter, intermittently lived in Brighton, calling it "Piccadilly by the Seaside"; resided at 11 Sillwood Road
- Edward Tyas Cook, journalist, editor, man of letters, born in Brighton in 1857
- Gaz Coombes, lead singer of band Supergrass, once lived in Brighton
- George Coppard, corporal in the British Army, wrote With A Machine Gun to Cambrai (a popular memoir of World War I), born in Brighton in 1898
- Beth Cordingly, actress (played PC Kerry Young in The Bill), was born in Brighton in 1977
- David Cordingly, authority on pirates (of the pre-modern era), father of Beth Cordingly, lives in Brighton
- Tich Cornford, cricketer for Sussex, died in Brighton
- Tom Cotcher, Scottish actor, lives in Brighton
- George Cotterill, footballer, born in Brighton in 1868
- Joseph Cotterill, cricketer for Sussex (1870–1888), played once for England, born in Brighton in 1851
- David Courtney, born David Cohen in Whitehawk, composer and record producer; discovered and co-wrote with Leo Sayer; also nephew of Henry Cohen who conceived and built Brighton Marina
- Robin Cousins, figure skater, won gold at 1980 Olympics, lives in Brighton
- Graham Coutts, murderer of Jane Longhurst in 2003, lived in Brighton
- Sam Crane, actor, born in Brighton
- Addison Cresswell, comedy agent, went to St Luke's Primary School and Brighton Polytechnic
- Luke Cresswell, of musical performers Stomp
- Henry Radcliffe Crocker, dermatologist, born in Hove in 1846
- Lance Cronin, footballer
- James Crump, founder of St. Aubyn's School (named after the Hove street in which he lived)
- Thomas Cubitt, master builder, employed in the development of Kemp Town; lived in 13 Lewes Crescent
- Graham Cutts, a leading British film director in the 1920s, was born in Brighton in 1885

== D ==
- James Daly, footballer
- Tim Daniels, cricketer for Oxford UCCE, born in Brighton in 1980
- Alfred Darling, pioneer film equipment manufacturer
- Ralph Darling, Governor of New South Wales 1825–1831, who prevented theatre in Sydney, died in Brighton in 1858
- John Davey, cricketer for the MCC and Sussex, born in Brighton in 1847, died in Brighton in 1874
- Glen Davies, footballer, born in Brighton in 1976
- Nicholas Davies, journalist associated with Robert Maxwell, lived in Brighton in 1993
- Philip Davies, cricketer for Sussex, born in Brighton in 1893, attended Brighton College
- Jill Day, singer and actress in the 1950s to early 1960s, was born in Brighton in 1930
- Joe Day, footballer
- Lewis Dayton, actor of the 1920s, was born in Brighton in 1889
- Alex 'Ali Dino' Dean, bassist in UK metalcore band Architects
- Roger Dean, artist, famous for prog-rock album covers
- Frederick Delve, firefighter and chief of the London Fire Brigade, 1948–1962, was born in Brighton in 1902
- John Leopold Denman, architect, designed many buildings in and around Brighton, was born in Brighton in 1882
- Charlie Dennis, footballer
- Alfie Deyes, YouTuber lives in Brighton
- Amita Dhiri, actress, born in Brighton
- Clarissa Dickson Wright, celebrity chef and television personality, attended Sacred Heart School (then in Hove)
- Maude Dickinson, inventor
- Jeremy Dier, tennis player
- Coningsby Disraeli, Member of Parliament for Altrincham, nephew of Benjamin Disraeli, died in Hove in 1936
- John Charles Dollman, painter and illustrator, born in Hove in 1851
- Alan Donohoe, singer with the band The Rakes, lives in Brighton
- Lord Alfred Douglas, poet and writer; friend and lover of Oscar Wilde
- Angus Douglas-Hamilton, Victoria Cross recipient
- David Downton, fashion illustrator, has lived in Brighton
- Alfred Drayton, stage and film actor, born in Brighton
- Tim Dry, actor and artist, lived in Brighton in the 1970s
- Graham Duff television writer and actor famous for BBC Three TV series ideal
- Alice Dudeney, writer, born in Brighton in 1866
- Polly Dunbar, illustrator and writer, went to Brighton University, now lives in Brighton
- Lewis Dunk, footballer for Brighton & Hove Albion, born in Brighton in 1991
- Richard Durrant, guitarist, born in Hollingbury, Brighton in 1962

== E ==
- Brian Eastman, film and television producer
- Frederick Charles Eden, church architect and designer, born in Brighton in 1864
- Connie Ediss, buxom comedian in Edwardian music hall, also acted in a few 1930s films, born and died in Brighton
- Christiana Edmunds, "The Chocolate Cream Poisoner", while living in Brighton, poisoned several people (killing a four-year-old boy) with adulterated chocolate creams in the 1870s
- Les Edwards, illustrator, lives in Brighton
- Nick Van Eede, lead singer, Cutting Crew
- Adam El-Abd, Egyptian-English footballer for Brighton & Hove Albion, was born in Brighton in 1984
- Joe El-Abd, rugby union player, born in Brighton in 1980
- Jago Eliot, Lord Eliot, involved in a variety of arts projects, briefly lived in Brighton
- Charlotte Elliott, poet and hymn writer, lived in Brighton in the latter part of her life
- G. H. Elliott, music hall singer and comedian, buried in Rottingdean church yard
- Henry Venn Elliott, English divine, minister of St Mary the Virgin, Brighton, died at Brunswick Square 1865
- Sean Ellis, film director, was born in Brighton c.1970
- Steve Ellis, singer with the band Love Affair, lives in Brighton
- Gary Elphick, footballer
- Tommy Elphick, footballer
- Harriet Elphinstone-Dick, early swimming champion, originally from Brighton, taught swimming at Brill's Baths in Pool Valley
- Maurice Elvey, one of Britain's most prolific film directors of the silent era, died in a nursing home in Brighton in 1967
- Bella Emberg, actress; co-star of The Russ Abbot Show
- Revd. Richard Enraght, religious controversialist, curate of St. Paul's Church, Brighton 1867–71, and priest in Charge of St. Andrew's Church, Portslade 1871–74
- Chris Eubank, ex-boxer, holds the purchased title of "Lord of the manor of Brighton"
- Chris Eubank, Jr., boxer, son of Chris Eubank, lives in Brighton
- Maurice Evans, leading Shakespearan actor in the United States, regularly in Bewitched and Batman, and Dr Zaius in Planet of the Apes
- Simon Evans, comedian, lives in Hove
- Paul Evans, poet of the British Poetry Revival of the 1960s and '70s, studied at Sussex, and later returned to Hove
- George Everest, surveyor after whom the mountain was named, buried in Hove
- Marjorie Eyre, D'Oyly Carte soprano, died in Brighton in 1987

== F ==
- Michael Fabricant MP, born in Brighton in 1950; educated at the Brighton, Hove and Sussex Grammar School
- Rotimi Fani-Kayode, photographer who explored sexuality, race and culture, lived in Brighton in his youth
- Simon Fanshawe, broadcaster, writer, and comedian, lives in Kemptown
- Joseph Jefferson Farjeon (1883–1955), crime novelist and playwright, died in Hove
- Tommy Farr, boxer, "The Tonypandy Terror", ran a pub in Brighton after retirement
- Fatboy Slim, real name Norman Cook, musician formerly of band The Housemartins
- Steve Ferrone, drummer with Average White Band and for various high-profile performers, born in Brighton in 1950
- Frank Finlay, actor, owned a house in Wyndham Street for 30 years until 2009
- Fink (Fin Greenall) (born 1972), singer, songwriter, guitarist, producer, DJ, is based in Brighton
- Maria Fitzherbert, illegitimate wife of George IV (under the Royal Marriages Act 1772 marriage of a member of the Royal Family without permission of the monarch was illegal)
- Robert Thomas Flower, 8th Viscount Ashbrook, Irish aristocrat, Lieutenant-Colonel in the British Army, and inventor; lived at 22 Adelaide Crescent, Hove, in the 1860s
- Russell Floyd, actor, lives in Brighton
- Wes Fogden, footballer for Brighton & Hove Albion and various other clubs in the south of England, born in Brighton in 1988
- Chris Foreman, nicknamed Chrissy Boy, guitarist, Madness.
- Gustavus Fowke, cricketer for Leicestershire, born in Brighton in 1880
- Derek Francis, comedy and character actor, was born in Brighton in 1923
- Tommy Fraser, footballer
- Darren Freeman, footballer
- William Friese-Greene, cinematographic pioneer, subject of the film The Magic Box

== G ==
- Leon Garfield, novelist, born in Brighton in 1921
- Sam Gargan, footballer
- Constance Garnett, early translator of Tolstoy, Dostoyevsky and Chekhov, was born in Brighton and attended Brighton and Hove High School
- David Garnett, novelist, Bloomsbury Group member, lover of Duncan Grant, was born in Brighton
- John Garrick, film actor, was born in Brighton in 1902
- Joe Gatting, cricketer and footballer
- Leslie Gay (1871–1949), cricketer and footballer
- George, Prince of Wales, Prince Regent, and later King George IV of the United Kingdom
- Grant Gee, filmmaker and music video director
- Mikey Georgeson, artist, moved to Brighton in 1989
- Dave Gibbons, comic book illustrator, famed for co-creating Watchmen
- Annabel Giles, TV presenter, lived in Brighton
- Eric Gill, typographer, engraver, sculptor, born in Brighton in 1882
- Nick Gillard, stunt coordinator, Star Wars, Indiana Jones, Alien; was born and still lives in Brighton's North Laine
- Charlie Gilmour, footballer
- David Gilmour, guitarist and vocalist of Pink Floyd, owns house on Kings Esplanade, Hove
- Harvey Goldsmith, rock promoter
- Nat Gonella, singer and trumpeter, lived in Saltdean
- William Gold, a.k.a. Wilbur Soot, popular YouTuber and singer-songwriter, grew up in Brighton and currently resides there
- JoAnne Good, radio presenter and actress, lives in Brighton
- Arthur Murray Goodhart, composer and organist, lived in Brighton
- Leon Gordon, Hollywood screenwriter, born in Brighton in 1894
- Theodore Gordon, Scottish inspector of army hospitals, died in Brighton in 1845
- Colin Grant, author, lives in Brighton
- Stephen Grant, comedian and writer, lives in Brighton and frequently performs in the town's Komedia venue
- Emily Gravett, children's author and illustrator, lives in Brighton
- Simon Greatwich, footballer
- Graham Greene, writer (worked in but did not live in Brighton)
- Dave Greenfield, keyboard player with The Stranglers, born in Brighton in 1949
- Roy Greenslade, professor of journalism at City University London, media commentator and journalist for The Guardian and the London Evening Standard, has lived in Brighton since the 1970s
- Lucy Griffiths, actress (attended Varndean College)
- Ioan Grillo, journalist and author of the book El Narco: Inside Mexico's Criminal Insurgency
- Nicholas Grimshaw, architect, designed Waterloo International railway station and the Eden Project, was born in Hove
- Martha Gunn, famous dipper and friend of the Prince Regent
- Sally Gunnell, athlete, Olympic 400m hurdles champion in 1992
- Gerry Gurr, footballer

== H ==
- Almer Hall, football player and manager, was born in Hove
- Brian Hall, actor (played Terry the chef in Fawlty Towers), born in Brighton in 1937
- Grant Hall, footballer
- Bertrand Hallward, university administrator and centenarian
- Eamon Hamilton, of the band Brakes and formerly of British Sea Power
- Kay Hammond, stage and film actress, wife of John Clements, died in Brighton in 1980
- Robert Hammond, (1850-1915) pioneered electricity supply for shop lighting in Brighton in 1882
- Gilbert Harding TV personality in the 1950s; lived in Clifton Terrace, Brighton
- Cyriak Harris, British freelance animator, lived in Brighton for 10 years
- Harry Harrison, science fiction writer, had a flat in Brighton for his visits to England
- Phil Hartnoll, of band Orbital
- Lee Harwood, poet, moved to Brighton in 1967
- Tony Hawks, comedian, author and philanthropist
- John Albert Hay, former British politician
- Peter Thomas Hay, author
- Michael Heath, cartoonist
- Den Hegarty, of bands Darts and Rocky Sharpe and the Razors/Replays
- Toby Hemingway, actor best known for playing Reid Garwin in The Covenant
- Max Hemmings, footballer
- Sue Hendra, author and illustrator
- James Herbert, horror author of The Rats and The Fog
- Phoebe Hessel, disguised herself as a man to join the British Army, moved to Brighton; died in 1821 aged 108; buried in the graveyard of St Nicholas Church, Brighton
- Dave Hill, Marxist educator, grew up in Brighton and was a local Labour councillor
- Rowland Hill, postal reformer
- Steve Hillier of band Dubstar (Hove)
- Daisy and Violet Hilton, conjoined twins born in Brighton in 1908; toured the US sideshow and Vaudeville circuit
- Annie Holland, guitarist with Britpop band Elastica, lives in Brighton
- Georg Hólm, bassist of Sigur Rós
- Nicholas van Hoogstraten, multimillionaire and property tycoon
- Rufus Hound, comedian and presenter
- Richard Hough, writer on maritime history, was born in Brighton
- Martin How, composer and organist with the Royal School of Church Music, briefly lived in Brighton as a child
- Derek Hudson, conductor and composer in Rhodesia and Zimbabwe, born in Hove
- Dionne Hughes, comedian and television presenter, briefly lived in Brighton
- Herbert Hughes, Irish composer, collector of folk songs, died in Brighton in 1937
- Jason Hughes, Welsh actor, lives in Brighton
- Barbara Hulanicki, fashion designer and founder of Biba, moved to Brighton aged 12, studied at Brighton Art College
- Jessica Hynes (née Stephenson), actress and writer, grew up in Brighton

== I ==
- Paul Ifill, footballer
- Boyd Irwin, actor, appeared in 135 films between 1915 and 1948, was born in Brighton in 1880

== J ==
- Jacksepticeye, real name Seán William McLoughlin, Irish game commentator, currently lives in Brighton
- Mick Jackson, writer, best known for novel The Underground Man, lives in Brighton
- Edward James, poet and art collector, who lent many famous Surrealist works to Brighton Museum in the 1950s and 1960s
- Peter James, writer of detective stories featuring Roy Grace, was born in Brighton
- Samantha Janus, actress in EastEnders
- Konrad Jarnot, opera singer
- Michael Jayston, actor, lives in Hove
- Richard Jefferies, nature writer (1848–1887), lived at 87 Lorna Road, Hove, from 1882 to 1884 and wrote his spiritual autobiography The Story of My Heart (1883) there.
- Teddy Jenks, footballer
- Gwyneth Jones, novelist
- Jenny Jones, prominent member of the Green Party, grew up in Brighton
- Maggie Jones, Baroness Jones of Whitchurch, Labour politician, lives in Brighton
- Peter Jones, actor and Just A Minute panellist; had a house in Hove in the 1970s
- William Jones (1876–1959), footballer
- Brandon Joseph-Buadi, footballer
- Petra Joy, German feminist and advocate/producer of erotic films for women, lives in Brighton

== K ==
- Charles Albert Keeley, pioneering colour theorist and entertainer
- Natasha Kaplinsky, journalist and newsreader
- Tim Keegan, English musician, lives in Brighton
- Nigel Kennedy, violinist, born at the Royal Sussex County Hospital and lived at Regency Square, Brighton and Lyndhurst Road, Hove during his childhood
- Bobak Kianoush, member of boy band Another Level, born in Hove and attended Blatchington Mill School
- Michael Kilgarriff, tall actor, born in Brighton in 1937
- Alex King, rugby player
- Matt King, actor and comedian; Super Hans in Peep Show
- Philip King, playwright; wrote the farce See How They Run
- William King, philanthropist; supporter of Cooperative Movement
- Rudyard Kipling, author; lived in Rottingdean between 1897 and 1903
- William Forsell Kirby, entomologist and folklorist, lived in Brighton
- Prince Peter Alexeevich Kropotkin, Russian anarchist; resident 1912–17

== L ==
- Thomas Lainson, architect
- Michael Langdon, opera singer, died in Hove in 1997
- George Larner, race-walker; double gold medallist at 1908 Olympics
- Walter Ledermann, mathematician, lived in Rottingdean and Hove
- Vivien Leigh, actress, Scarlet O'Hara in Gone with the Wind
- Alfred Lennon, father of John Lennon, was living in Brighton at the time of his death in 1976
- PJ Liguori, internet personality and filmmaker under the name KickThePJ, who currently resides in Brighton
- Fred Lillywhite, cricketer; organised first England overseas tour
- David Lindsay, Scottish novelist (wrote A Voyage to Arcturus), ran a boarding house in Brighton, died in Hove in 1945
- Alice Litman (2002–2022), transgender woman
- Ken Livingstone, politician; formerly Mayor of London; had a house in the Seven Dials area
- Hugh Lloyd, actor and comedian, lived in Rottingdean
- Emma Lomax, composer, pianist, toy theatre enthusiast was born, lived and worked in Brighton
- Jane Longhurst, killed by Graham Coutts; the Jane Longhurst Trust was set up to campaign for the criminalisation of what the Government labelled "extreme pornography", a move opposed by Backlash and the Consenting Adult Action Network
- Jay Lovett, football player and manager
- E G Handel Lucas (1861–1936), artist, lived in Brighton from 1909 to 1914
- Greg Luer, footballer
- Ida Lupino, actress and film-maker, daughter of Stanley Lupino, attended schools at Norman Road, Aldrington and Ventnor Villas, Hove and the Sunday school of All Saints Church, Hove
- Desmond Lynam, broadcaster
- Zoe Lyons, comedian, lives in Brighton
- Lovejoy, indie rock band, formed in Brighton

== M ==
- Matt Machan, Sussex cricketer
- Percival Mackey, pianist, composer and music director in the early 20th century, lived in Brighton
- Mathilde Madden, erotica author, lives in Brighton
- Sake Dean Mahomet, introduced shampooing and medicated baths to Britain
- Stephen Mallinder, musician, lives in Brighton
- Gideon Mantell, doctor, palaeontologist, discoverer of dinosaurs (Iguanodon), lived and worked in Brighton in the 1830s
- Lesley Manville (born 1956), English actress
- James Marriott, musician and YouTuber, lives in Brighton
- Edward Marshall-Hall, criminal barrister famous for Edwardian theatrics in court
- Russell Martin, football player and manager
- Niall Mason, footballer
- Ivan Massow, entrepreneur
- Susan Maughan, singer of hit record "Bobby's Girl", lived in Rottingdean
- Peter Mayle, author of A Year in Provence
- Conor Maynard, singer, was born in Brighton
- Margaret Mayo, children's author, lives in Brighton
- Pete McCarthy, actor and writer, lived in Brighton for a while, and List of Brighton & Hove bus names a local bus was named after him
- Natascha McElhone, actress in Surviving Picasso, The Truman Show, Solaris, Californication; spent childhood in Brighton (attended St Mary's Hall)
- Joe McGann, actor; star of The Upper Hand
- Seán McLoughlin aka Jacksepticeye, popular Irish YouTuber, lives in Brighton
- Kevin McNally, actor, lives in Brighton
- Harriet Mellon (1777–1837), actress, wife of banker Thomas Coutts, had a house by Regency Square, Brighton
- Alan Melville (1910–1983), revue author, playwright, lyricist, radio and TV personality; moved to Brighton in 1951 and lived in Clifton Terrace and Victoria Street
- Sara Mendes da Costa, the British Telecom speaking clock
- Kevin Meredith, a.k.a. Lomokev, photographer, lives and works in Brighton
- Prince Klemens von Metternich (15 May 1773 – 11 June 1859), Austrian Foreign Minister, Diplomat and creator of the Congress of Vienna
- Max Miller, comedian, the "Cheeky Chappie", born in Brighton in 1894, lived there most of his life; blue plaque at 160 Marine Parade and statue in New Road
- Heather Mills, ex-wife of ex-Beatle Sir Paul McCartney, owns the vegan restaurant VBites in Hove
- Fred Monk (1920–1987), football player and coach
- Bruce Montague, actor (played Leonard in Butterflies), lives in Brighton
- Juan, Count of Montizón, the Carlist claimant to the throne of Spain and Legitimist claimant to the throne of France — lived in Hove c.1870s – 1887, where he died; funeral mass held in the Church of the Sacred Heart, Hove
- William Moon, teacher and inventor of an alphabet for the blind
- Gary Moore, musician, guitarist with Thin Lizzy amongst others as well as solo, lived in Hove
- Ryan Moore, three-time champion jockey
- Caitlin Moran, journalist, was born in Brighton
- James Morrison, recording artist, lives in Hove
- Garnt Maneetapho aka Gigguk, popular Thai-British YouTuber, born in Brighton in 1990

== N ==
- Dame Anna Neagle, actress; lived at Lewes Crescent, Kemp Town
- Jo Neary, comedian, based in Brighton
- Vivien Neves, British model
- John Henry Newman, priest, writer, Catholic convert, Cardinal, now beatified, had a family home in Marine Square, Kemp Town, when he was a young man
- Annie Nightingale, BBC TV and Radio presenter and sometime Brighton night-club owner
- Michael Nightingale, film and television actor, born in Brighton in 1922
- Ray Noble, band leader, composer, born 17 December 1903 in 1 Montpelier Terrace
- Jeff Noon, speculative fiction writer
- Henry Normal, comedian, writer and TV producer, lives in Brighton

== O ==
- Bridget O'Connor, author and playwright, lived in Hove
- Peter O'Donnell, creator of Modesty Blaise
- Natasha O'Keeffe, actress, was born in Brighton
- Laurence Olivier (Lord Olivier) and Joan Plowright, lived at Royal Crescent 1960–78
- John Osborne, playwright, lived in 7a Arundel Terrace, Kemp Town in the 1950s
- Kitty O'Shea, wife of Charles Stewart Parnell
- Denise Van Outen, television presenter, currently renovating a house
- Steve Ovett, Olympic runner, 800 metres gold medalist in 1980, born and brought up in Brighton; there was a statue of him in Preston Park, Brighton, which was stolen, and a replacement statue is in Madeira Drive; was made Freeman of the city in July 2012
- Bill Owen, actor, lived in Sussex Square in the 1950s
- Tom Owen (born 1949), actor, son of Bill Owen, was born in Brighton
- Adrian Oxaal, guitarist, formerly with James
- Ocean Wisdom, rapper, grew up in Brighton

== P ==
- Will Packham, footballer
- George Painter, biographer, died at Hove on 8 Dec 2005
- Chris Paling, novelist
- Patsy Palmer, EastEnders actress
- Steve Palmer, footballer
- Juliet Pannett (1911–2005), born in Hove, portrait artist
- Mike Paradinas, musician, lives in Hove
- Charles Stewart Parnell, Irish politician, died in Brighton
- Passenger, real name Mike Rosenberg, singer, is originally from Brighton
- Heather Peace, actress and musician, lives in Brighton
- David Pearce, philosopher
- John Pedder (1784–1859), first Chief Justice of Van Diemen's Land, died in Brighton
- Donald Peers, Welsh crooner, lived in St. John's Road, Hove; memorial tablet at Downs Crematorium
- John Pelling, artist, born (1930) and raised in Hove
- Laurie Penny, columnist and blogger, grew up in Brighton, attended Brighton College
- Fred Perry, tennis player, lived in Rottingdean
- Roland Pertwee, playwright, screenwriter and actor; was born and grew up in Denmark Villas, Hove
- Felix Arvid Ulf Kjellberg, better known by online pseudonym PewDiePie, Swedish internet personality, who currently resides in Brighton
- Otto Pfenninger (1855–1929), moved to Brighton where he pioneered colour photography
- Sir Richard Phillips (1767–1840), author, died in Brighton
- Samuel Phillips (1814–1854), journalist, died in Brighton
- Karen Pickering, swimmer, former 200 metres freestyle champion
- William Thomas Pike (1838–1924), publisher, journalist, writer, editor. Lived and worked for much of his life in Brighton., and died in Hove
- David Pilbeam, anthropologist
- Alan Pipes, author and illustrator
- Adam Pitts, drummer of the band Lawson
- Andrew Plimer (1763–1837), portrait miniaturist, died in Brighton
- Joan Plowright, see Lord Olivier, above
- Tony Pollard (born 1965), battlefield archaeologist, lived in Brighton 1995–1997
- Peter Polycarpou, actor, was born in Brighton
- Tim Pope, film director and video maker
- John Cyril Porte (1884–1919), flying boat pioneer, died in Brighton
- Samuel Preston, lead singer of the band The Ordinary Boys, formally married to Celebrity Big Brother winner, Chantelle Houghton
- Katie Price, model (also known as Jordan)
- Partho Sen-Gupta, film director and scriptwriter (resident since October 2006)
- Luke Pritchard, lead singer and rhythm guitarist for The Kooks
- Jay Purvis (born 1976), Canadian model and television presenter, lived in Brighton in his youth

== Q ==
- Roger Quilter, composer, born at 4 Brunswick Square, Brunswick Town in 1877

== R ==
- Thomas Raikes (1777–1848), dandy, friend of Beau Brummell, the Duke of Wellington and Talleyrand, died in Brighton soon after buying a house there
- Peggy Ramsay (1908–1991), theatrical agent, lived in Kensington Place, Brighton; blue plaque at the property
- Robert Rankin, author
- Terence Rattigan, playwright, author of The Browning Version and The Winslow Boy lived at Bedford House, 79 Marine Parade; blue plaque at the property
- Tom Raworth, poet, lived in Brighton; now lives in Hove
- Rita Ray, former singer with the Darts, latterly radio presenter and DJ
- Glen Rea, footballer
- Amanda Redman, actress, born in Brighton in 1957
- Matt Redman, Christian musician, lives in Brighton
- Siân Rees, English historian of the 17th and 18th centuries, lives in Brighton
- Terence Reese, from London, a national and international award-winning player of and highly regarded writer on contract bridge; a writer on other games; died at the age of 83 of aspirin poisoning on January 29, 1996, at his residence at 23 Adelaide Crescent; an inquest ruled his death accidental
- Philip Reeve, novelist; grew up in Brighton
- Louise Rennison, writer (author of Angus, Thongs and Full-Frontal Snogging) and comedian, went to Brighton University, and lived in Brighton
- Sam Rents, footballer
- Dakota Blue Richards, actress, lives in Brighton, attended Brighton College
- Laurence Rickard, actor, writer, notable for his role in the Horrible Histories television series, was born and still lives in Brighton
- Mike Ring, footballer, born in Brighton in 1961
- Rizzle Kicks, hip-hop duo
- Haydon Roberts, footballer
- Paul Roberts, frontman and singer with pop band the Stranglers; session singer and actor
- Simon Roberts, photographer, lives in Brighton
- Frederick William Robertson, Anglican divine
- George Robey (1869–1954), music hall comedian, lived in Arundel Drive, Saltdean until his death
- Jake Robinson, footballer
- Dame Flora Robson, actress, 1960 until her death in 1984, famous as Elizabeth I
- Dame Anita Roddick, founder of The Body Shop, opened first shop in Kensington Gardens, Brighton in 1976; a blue commemorative plaque marks the building
- John Roman Baker, poet, playwright and novelist, spent his childhood and much of his adult life in Brighton
- Martin Rossiter, singer with the band Gene, lives in Brighton
- Suzi Ruffell, comedian, writer and podcaster lives in Hove
- Arnold Ruge, German philosopher and political writer, lived in exile in Brighton from 1850 until his death in 1880
- Dr. Richard Russell (1687–1759), encouraged the submersion in and drinking of seawater; buried in the churchyard of St Nicholas Church, Brighton
- Gilbert Ryle, philosopher
- John Alfred Ryle, professor of medicine at Cambridge and Oxford; physician to George V; brother of Gilbert Ryle
- Martin Ryle, winner of 1974 Nobel Prize in Physics

== S ==
- Charles Sabini, criminal, said to have lived in the Grand Hotel, Brighton, ran protection rackets against bookmakers; inspiration for character Colleoni in Graham Greene's Brighton Rock
- Victoria Sackville-West, had two houses in Sussex Square, Kemp Town conjoined by Sir Edwin Lutyens, who also built her another at nearby Roedean
- Sir Albert Abdullah David Sassoon, British Indian philanthropist and merchant, 1st Baronet Sassoon
- Sir Edward Albert Sassoon, businessman and politician, MP for Hythe, whose mausoleum became the Hanbury Arms; 2nd Baronet Sassoon, of Kensington Gore
- Tom Sayers, boxer
- Leo Sayer, singer born in Shoreham-by-Sea lived in Brighton, discovered in Brighton by David Courtney
- Paul Scofield, actor, lived in Brighton as a child and went to school there
- Tom Searle, guitarist of UK Metalcore band Architects
- Dan Searle, drummer of UK Metalcore band Architects
- Captain Sensible, punk musician with The Damned
- Jake Shillingford, musician and front-man of My Life Story
- Roy Skelton, actor and voice of the Daleks in Doctor Who and Zippy and George in Rainbow
- Sylvia Sleigh, artist
- Alistair Slowe, footballer
- George Albert Smith, pioneering early cinematographer, lived and built a studio in Hove
- John Smith, Knight Grand Cross of the Royal Guelphic Order
- Kevin Smith, cricketer
- Jack Smith, painter
- Jimmy Somerville, musician formerly of band The Communards
- Wilbur Soot, YouTuber and musician, lives in Brighton
- Ewen Spencer, photographer
- Herbert Spencer, philosopher and political theorist
- Andi Spicer, composer, lives in Brighton
- Victor Spinetti, actor, film, stage TV, lived in Kemp Town
- Dusty Springfield, singer, had a home in Wilbury Road, Hove
- Arthur Stanley-Clarke, first-class cricketer and British Army officer
- Jesse Starkey, footballer
- Paul Stenning, author, was born and lived in Brighton as a child
- Jordan Stephens, singer in the duo Rizzle Kicks
- Fin Stevens, footballer
- Victor Stiebel, fashion designer, lived in Chichester Terrace
- Jack Strachey, composer and songwriter, lived in Brighton towards the end of his life
- Brian Street, anthropologist; lived in Brighton, died in Hove
- Andy Sturgeon, garden designer (winner at 2010 Chelsea Flower Show), has lived in Brighton
- Zoe Sugg, YouTuber lives in Brighton
- Joakim Sundström, Swedish sound editor, sound designer and musician
- Keston Sutherland, poet, lives in Brighton
- Suvadhana, Thai princess, lived in Brighton in the middle of the 20th century

== T ==
- Chris T-T, singer-songwriter, lives in Brighton
- Tagore family, of Kolkata, owned a house here in the 19th century
- Sir Peter Tapsell, Conservative Party politician, was born in Brighton
- Keith Taylor, Member of the European Parliament for the Green Party, lives or lived in Brighton
- Maui Taylor, Filipino actress, big in the Philippines, born in Brighton
- Noah Taylor, Australian actor and musician, lives in Brighton
- Chris Terrill, adventurer, anthropologist and filmmaker
- Angela Thirkell, buried in St Margaret's Church, Rottingdean
- David Thomas, lead singer of Pere Ubu, Rocket from the Tombs, and David Thomas & Two Pale Boys
- Francis Tillstone, Brighton's Town Clerk from 1881 to 1904
- Peter Tobin (born 1946), serial killer, lived in Brighton in the 1970s and 1980s
- Denise Tolkowsky, composer
- Tony Towner, footballer
- Arthur Treacher, actor
- Tommy Trinder comedian, owned and lived in 71 Marine Parade
- Jack Tripp, English pantomime dame, died 2005
- Lynne Truss, writer; author of Eats, Shoots & Leaves
- Roger Tucker (born 1945), television and film director
- Ed Turns, footballer
- Keith Tyson, artist and Turner Prize winner in 2002, studied Critical Fine Art Practice at Brighton University's Grand Parade campus

== V ==
- David Van Day, singer
- Ralph Vaughan Williams, composer, went to school in Rottingdean
- Wanda Ventham, actress, was born in Brighton
- Adam Virgo, footballer
- Magnus Volk, electrical engineer and inventor

== W ==
- Johnny Wakelin, musician, born in Brighton in 1939
- Peter Wales, Sussex cricketer, born in Hove in 1928
- Seann Walsh, comedian, brought up in Brighton
- Keith Waterhouse, journalist, novelist and playwright, lived in Embassy Court, Brighton
- David Watkin, Oscar and BAFTA winning cinematographer, lived in Sussex Mews, Kemp Town until his death in 2008
- Alan Weeks, BBC sports commentator, notably for ice hockey and other winter sports, grew up in Brighton and died in Hove
- Scott Welch, boxer, moved to Brighton at age 16
- Paul Weller, footballer
- Louise Wener, lead singer of 1990s Britpop band Sleeper and author
- Ben Wheatley, film director, lives in Brighton and made the film Down Terrace
- David Wheeler, footballer
- Gary Whelan, Irish actor, lives in Brighton and owns the Lion & Lobster pub there
- Thomas and Alex White, musicians and members of Electric Soft Parade and Brakes
- Wildman Whitehouse, surgeon and destroyer of the first transatlantic telegraph cable
- Rachel Whiteread, artist and Turner Prize winner in 1993
- Octavia Wilberforce, doctor, suffragist, founder of New Sussex Hospital for Women, and lifelong partner of Elizabeth Robins, had a home and medical practice in Montpelier Crescent
- Herbert Wilcox, film producer and director lived in Lewes Crescent, Kemp Town
- Amon Wilds and his son Amon Henry Wilds, both Regency architects, prolific in Brighton
- Stan Willemse (1924–2011), footballer
- Billy Williams, Australian music hall performer, died in Hove in 1915
- Mark Williams, member of The Fast Show team and actor in the Harry Potter films
- James Williamson, cinema pioneer, had a chemist's shop in Church Road, Hove before building a studio in Cambridge Grove
- Holly Willoughby, television presenter, born in Brighton
- Joe Lee Wilson, jazz singer
- John Wisden, cricketer, founded Wisden Cricketers' Almanack
- Robert Wisden, actor, was born in Brighton
- W.I.Z., music video director
- Eliza Wyatt, American playwright and author

== Y ==
- Bernard Youens, actor who played Stan Ogden in Coronation Street, was born in Hove
- Robert Young, guitarist and co-founder of Primal Scream, lived in Hove
- Robyn Young, author

== Z ==
- Helen Zahavi, writer
- Paul Zenon, magician

== See also ==
- List of people from Sussex

== Bibliography ==
- Carder, Tim; Harris, Roger (1997). Albion A–Z: A Who's Who of Brighton & Hove Albion F.C. Hove: Goldstone Books. ISBN 978-0-9521337-1-1.
- Collis, Rose (2010). The New Encyclopaedia of Brighton. (based on the original by Tim Carder) (1st ed.). Brighton: Brighton & Hove Libraries. ISBN 978-0-9564664-0-2.
- Dale, Antony (1967) [1947]. Fashionable Brighton 1820–1860 (2nd ed.). Newcastle-upon-Tyne: Oriel Press Ltd. ISBN 0-85362-028-8.
- Middleton, Judy (2003). The Encyclopaedia of Hove & Portslade. Brighton: Brighton & Hove Libraries.
- Musgrave, Clifford (1981). Life in Brighton. Rochester: Rochester Press. ISBN 0-571-09285-3.
