= Charles Clover =

Charles Clover may refer to:

- Charles Clover-Brown (1907–1982), English cricketer
- Charles Clover (environmental journalist), environmental journalist, author and documentary maker
- Charles Clover (athlete) (born 1955), British javelin thrower
