= Prhizzm =

Canadian electronic music artist

- Born: Brendan Dellandrea
- Origin: Canada
- Genre: Electronic
- Occupation: Musician
- Years active: 2003–2007
- Labels: Benbecula, Audiobulb

Prhizzm (real name Brendan Dellandrea) is a Canadian solo electronic music artist based in Toronto.

Dellandrea has been involved in the creation of electronic music since 2001. However, he has played the piano since the age of 13 and the violin since age 4. His first foray into published electronic music was the self-released Small Comfort EP in 2003. Next came the mp3-release Fragment Synthesis at Hippocamp.net. That release was removed from the site due to label interest and is no longer available, although four of the five tracks in this release have re-appeared on subsequent CD releases. Dellandrea's big break finally came when he was signed to Scotland's Benbecula Records and released a self-titled EP in March 2005. The Prhizzm EP was followed a year later by a full-length CD-R release within Benbecula's Mineral Series featuring "oddities and new tracks". The now-defunct Prhizzm website described the release as a collection of "early ambient tracks, EP b-sides, vocal tracks, and a sneak peek of the forthcoming prhizzm album".

In January 2007, Dellandrea accompanied local friend and musician Minisystem on keyboards for his debut record release party performance.

His father is Jon Dellandrea, an educator and recipient of the Order of Canada.

== Influences ==
Early musical influences mentioned by Dellandrea are Pink Floyd, Led Zeppelin, the Beach Boys, and The Cars. While electronica influences on his work are wide and varied, those clearly be heard include Boards of Canada and fellow Benbecula labelmate, christ.

== Discography ==
=== Albums ===
- Minerals – 2006, Benbecula Records

=== Singles and EPs ===
- Prhizzm EP – 2005, Benbecula Records; re-released in 2021 on streaming services
- Fragment Synthesis – 2004, Hippocamp.net
- Small Comfort EP – 2003, self-released

=== Contributions ===
- "Qualm" on Music Volume Four, Benbecula Records, 2007
- "Ordeal by Ice" on -40 (NFB Remixes), C0C0S0L1DC1T1, 2005
- "We are Intimate Strangers" on PlayBack (Salle de Jour Remixes), Hippocamp.net, 2004
- "Half Asleep" on Switches, Audiobulb Records, 2004
- "Aquatic Variant" on Exhibition #1, Audiobulb Records, 2003

=== Remixes ===
- "Happyfour Twenty (prhizzm remix)” on Christ.'s Vernor Vinge, Benbecula Records, 2006
