= John Whichcord Jr. =

English architect (1823-1885)

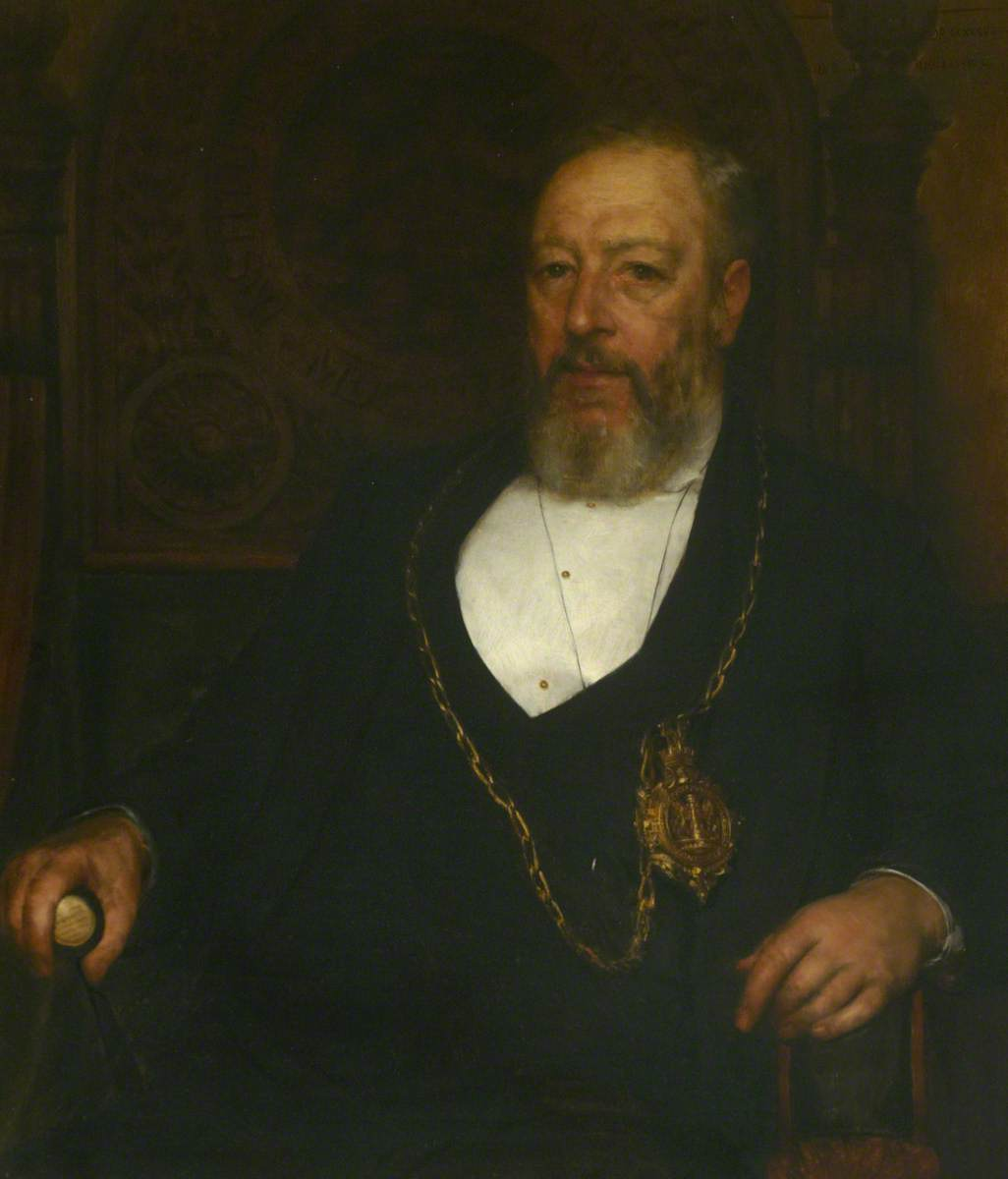
Whichcord by Lawrence Alma-Tadema

John Whichcord, Jr. FSA (11 November 1823 – 9 January 1885) was an English architect, who designed several office buildings in London and, also, the Grand Hotel in Brighton.

== Life and work ==
He was born in Maidstone, Kent in 1823, the son of John Whichcord Sr., an architect who had designed several public buildings in Kent. John Jnr., after education at Maidstone and at King's College London, became, in 1840, assistant to his father, and in 1844 a student at the Royal Academy, London. After a period of travel in Europe and the Middle East (1846–1850), and a tour in France, Germany, and Denmark (1850), he went into partnership (until 1858) with fellow architect Arthur Ashpitel.

With Ashpitel he carried out additions (1852) to Lord Abergavenny's house in Birling, Kent, and in 1858 built fourteen houses on the Mount Elliott estate at Lee in the same county (now in London). His subsequent work consisted largely of office premises in the City of London, such as 9 Mincing Lane, 24 Lombard Street and 8 Old Jewry; and Mansion House Chambers, the New Zealand Bank and the National Safe Deposit (all three in Queen Victoria Street, London), and Brown Janson & Co.'s bank, 32 Abchurch Lane.

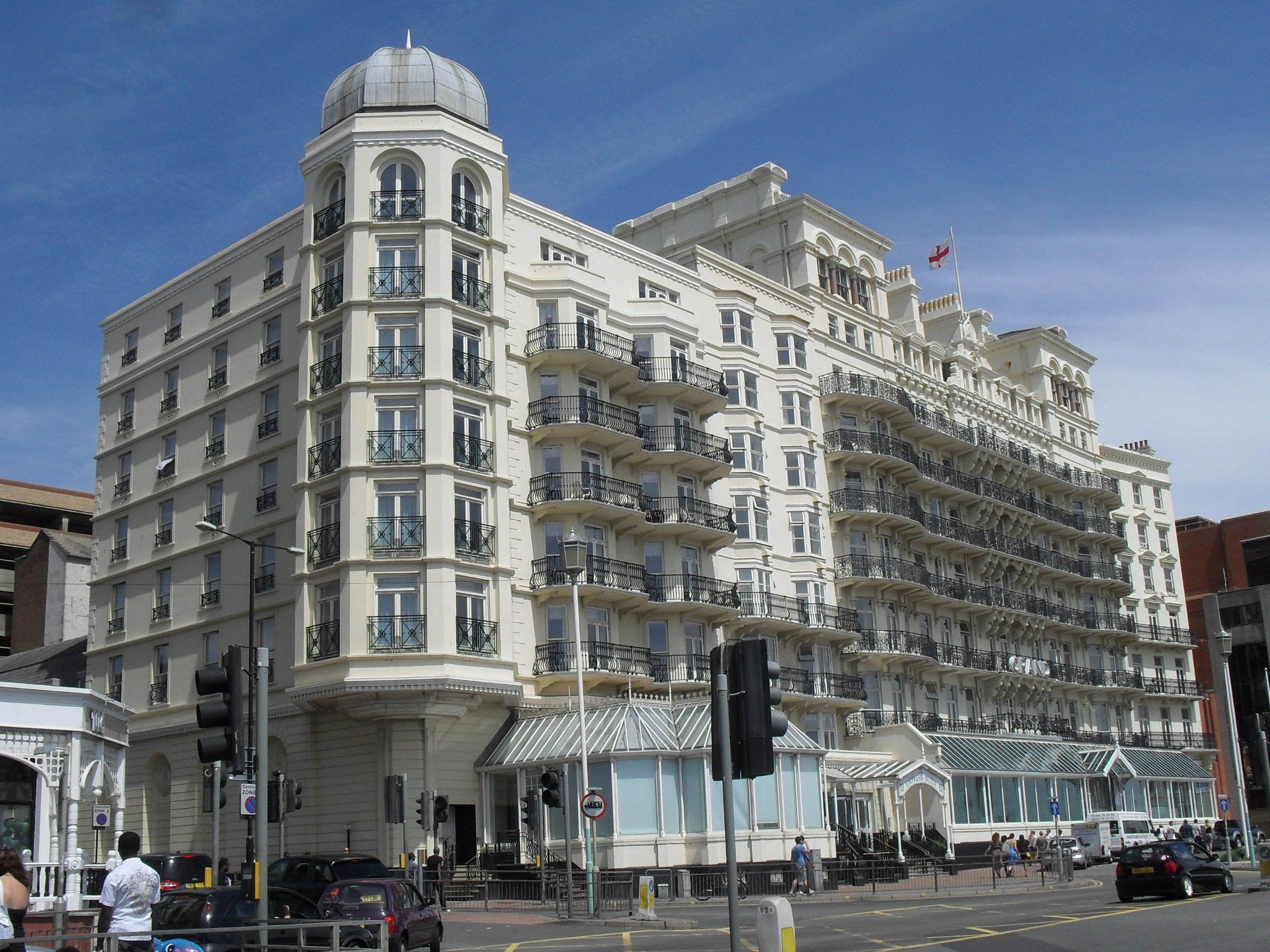
Grand Hotel, Brighton

He designed the Grand Hotel in Brighton and the Clarence Hotel in Dover (the latter demolished in 1949 after sustaining bomb damage during World War II), as well as St. Mary's Church and parsonage at Shortlands, near Bromley, Kent, where he also laid out the estate for building. One of Whichcord's best-known works was St Stephen's Club, Westminster (built 1874, demolished 1994), a classical building with boldly corbelled projections, facing Westminster bridge. He designed the internal fittings for the House of Parliament at Cape Town, South Africa. Whichcord was often employed as arbitrator in government matters, and he was one of the surveyors to the railway department of the Board of Trade.

From 1854, he held the post of district surveyor for Deptford, and from 1879 to 1881, was president of the Royal Institute of British Architects, where he delivered various addresses and papers, and was largely instrumental in the establishment of the examination system.

In 1865, Whichcord unsuccessfully contested the constituency of Barnstaple for the Conservatives. He became in 1869 captain in the 1st Middlesex Artillery Volunteers, for which he raised a battery mainly composed of young architects and lawyers. He was elected in 1848 a fellow of the Society of Antiquaries of London.

He died on 9 January 1885, and was buried at Kensal Green cemetery. He had married Marian Emma Thomas in 1860. His portrait was painted by Lawrence Alma-Tadema and exhibited at the Royal Academy, London in 1882.

== Publications ==
- History and Antiquities of the Collegiate Church of All Saints, Maidstone with illustrations: together with observations on the polychromatic decoration of the middle ages (J. Weale, 1845).
- Arthur Ashpitel, John Whichcord. An essay on the erection of fire-proof houses in flats (Weale, 1855).
- Arthur Ashpitel, John Whichcord. Observations on baths and wash-houses, with an account of their history (Weale, 1852).
