= Peter Thomas Hay =

British stam railway enthusiast

Peter Hay
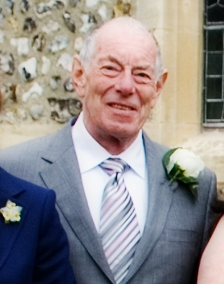
- Peter Hay, April 2008
- Born: Peter Thomas Hay; 31 August 1932; Brighton, Sussex, England
- Died: 7 June 2018 (aged 85)
- Occupations: Writer and Businessman
- Writing career
- Pen name: Peter Hay
- Period: (1984-present)
- Subjects: Steam Railways; Industrial History
- Website: www.middletonpress.co.uk/bcat_ser.php?cat=1&ser=11

Peter Thomas Hay (31 August 1932 – 7 June 2018) was an authority on British steam railways and author of numerous books and articles on the subject. His Steaming Through series of books is based on the archive of railway photographs taken by him in the 1950s and 60s.

== Biography ==
Peter Hay was born in Brighton, Sussex to John Edward Hay (Mayor of Brighton 1953) and May Hollingdale. He is brother to the former Conservative MP John Albert Hay. Evacuated to Toronto, Canada during World War II, he was subsequently educated at Brighton, Hove and Sussex Grammar School and the London School of Economics, after which he carried out National Service in the Navy. Following his initial training, he served as Supply Officer in the rank of Lieutenant (S) RNVR in HMS Vernon. He continued in the Royal Naval Reserve (Sussex Division) as a Commander and was awarded the Reserve Decoration (RD). He worked on the railways including holding the position of Station Master at Pevensey. He then worked at the Ministry of Transport before leaving to concentrate on writing, lecturing and running the family business. He married Patricia Mary Sweeney, they had four children, Fionnuala (b. 1965), Lawrence (b. 1967), Daniel (b. 1969) and Teresa (b. 1972).

In 2011 at the age of 79 while conducting Industrial History research at the Minllyn slate mine in North Wales, Peter and his son Daniel both suffered a fall in the mine resulting in multiple bone fractures. They exited the mine with their injuries and were rescued by a Westland Sea King helicopter from C Flight of No. 22 Squadron RAF Air Sea Rescue in Anglesey and taken to Bangor hospital for treatment. The author subsequently appeared on "Episode 2" of the BBC Television programme 'Helicopter Rescue' broadcast on 22 February 2012.

== Books published ==
- Pre Grouping Southern Steam in the 1950s (Sep 1983) I Allan, ISBN 0-7110-1255-5.
- Steaming Through Kent (Sep 1984) Middleton Press, ISBN 0-906520-13-4.
- Steaming Through East Hampshire (Apr 1985) Middleton Press, ISBN 0-906520-18-5.
- Steaming Through East Sussex (Oct 1985) Middleton Press, ISBN 0-906520-22-3.
- Brunel - Engineering Giant (Dec 1985) Trafalgar Square Publishing, ISBN 0-7134-5172-6.
- Steaming Through West Sussex (Oct 1987) Middleton Press, ISBN 0-906520-50-9.
- Steaming Through The Isle of Wight (Jun 1988) Middleton Press, ISBN 0-906520-56-8.
- Steaming Through West Hants (Jul 1989) Middleton Press, ISBN 0-906520-69-X.
- Steaming Through Surrey (Jul 1989) Middleton Press, ISBN 0-906520-39-8.
- British Railways Steaming Through Scotland (1991) Defiant Publications, ISBN 0-946857-35-0.
- British Railways Steaming on the South Coast (1991) Defiant Publications, ISBN 0-946857-29-6.
- Steaming Through Cornwall (Jun 1994) Middleton Press, ISBN 1-873793-30-8.

== See also ==
- List of people from Brighton and Hove
