= Come On Primates Show Your Teeth! =

- The artwork was created by John Charles Wilson (AKA Frog Pocket)

Studio album by Frog Pocket
- Released: September 24, 2007
- Recorded: 2007
- Genres: Electronica, folk, experimental, breakcore
- Label: Planet Mu
- Producer: Frog Pocket

Frog Pocket chronology
Gonglot (2005)	Come On Primates Show Your Teeth! (2007)

Come On Primates Show Your Teeth! (often shortened to Come On Primates!) is Frog Pocket's (AKA John Charles Wilson) third album, released in 2007. It is his second album with the record label Planet Mu. The artwork was created by John Charles Wilson himself, in his home of Ayr, Scotland.

== Track listing ==
All tracks are written by Frog Pocket.

No.	Title	Length
1.	"Mull Fhuar"	2:25
2.	"Rig of the Jarkness"	8:15
3.	"Lady Hunter Blair"	2:23
4.	"Windy Goule"	6:07
5.	"Kelpy Staircase"	5:23
6.	"Bo 'Arigh"	4:57
7.	"Eye Mountain"	1:28
8.	"Dungeon Hills"	7:36
9.	"Miall Leath"	3:16
10.	"Hevy Gruts"	6:31
11.	"Fog Pocket"	8:40
12.	"Wild Overtone Wind"	3:03
