= List of films set in Brighton =

== Films featuring Brighton ==
The city of Brighton has been featured in the following films:

- Bank Holiday (1938)
- Pink String and Sealing Wax (1946)
- Brighton Rock (1947)
- The First Gentleman (1948)
- The Adventures of Jane (1949)
- Genevieve (1953)
- Cast a Dark Shadow (1955)
- One Good Turn (1955)
- Linda (1960)
- The Night We Got the Bird (1961)
- Jigsaw (1962)
- The Chalk Garden (1963)
- Be My Guest (1964)
- Smokescreen (1964)
- Half a Sixpence (1967)
- Oh! What A Lovely War (1969)
- Loot (1970)
- On a Clear Day You Can See Forever (1970)
- Carry On at Your Convenience (1971)
- Villain (1971)
- Carry On Girls (1973)
- Quadrophenia (1979)
- Mona Lisa (1986)
- The Fruit Machine (1988)
- Under Suspicion (1991)
- Dirty Weekend (1993)
- The End of the Affair (1999)
- Circus (2000)
- Me Without You (2001)
- Ashes and Sand (2003)
- Dominator (2003)
- Skinhead Attitude (2004)
- Wimbledon (2004)
- MirrorMask (2005)
- Cassandra's Dream (2007)
- London to Brighton (2007)
- Angus, Thongs and Perfect Snogging (2008)
- Brighton Wok: The Legend of Ganja Boxing (2008)
- The Damned United (2009)
- Down Terrace (2009)
- Brighton Rock (2010)
- Sherlock Holmes: A Game of Shadows (2011)
- The Man Whose Mind Exploded (2012)
- Now Is Good (2012)
- 20,000 Days on Earth (2014)
- Young Hunters: The Beast of Bevendean (2015)
- Brighton Symphony of a City (2016)
- My Policeman (2022)
- Everything Everywhere All At Once (2022)

== Television programmes featuring Brighton ==
Brighton has also featured in the following television programmes:

- Stranger on the Shore (1961)
- Public Eye (series four; 1969)
- Doctor Who: The Leisure Hive (1980)
- Waiting for God (several episodes; series ran 1990–94)
- Only Fools and Horses (1992)
- Lovejoy (1993)
- Resort to Murder (1995)
- No Sweat (1997)
- Killer Net (1998)
- Sugar Rush (2006)
- Top Gear (2007)
- Cuffs (2015)
- The Level (2016)
- Grace (2020 & 2023)

== Musical videos featuring Brighton ==
- In 1984 Julien Temple filmed "Do it Again", a video of the song by The Kinks from their album Word of Mouth, which is partially set on Brighton Pier.
- The 1985 video for "Thinking of You" by The Colourfield was filmed on Brighton Beach and Palace Pier
- Sonia's 1989 video for "Can't Forget You" features Brighton seafront.
- The official video for Skream and Example's "Shot Yourself in the Foot Again" was shot on location in Brighton in early January, 2011.
- Singer Fabri Fibra choose Brighton for his music video of the song "Speak English".
- Singer Lorenzo Fragola also choose Brighton for his music video of the song "Infinite Volte".
- Laura Marling's music video for "Rambling Man" was set in Brighton.
- The Italian singer Coez used Brighton as his setting for the "È sempre bello" music video.
- Utada Hikaru's music video for "One Last Kiss" (2021) was partially filmed in Brighton and prominently features the Pier.
- Sam Smith - Kids Again music video, filmed on Brighton Pier and Brighton Beach

== Brighton as part of the film industry ==
Brighton played a part in the early development of filmmaking and cinematography as a home and work-place of William Friese-Greene, an early pioneer of the art (credited by some with its invention).

In the 1890s, early filmmaker George Albert Smith lived and built a studio in neighbouring Hove, now a part of the city of Brighton and Hove.

Brighton's Duke of York's Picturehouse has been in operation since 22 September 1910, making it the oldest purpose built and continually operating cinema in Britain.

== See also ==
- List of notable Brighton and Hove inhabitants, which includes some Brighton people related to the film industry.
