= St Stephen's Club =

Gentlemen's club in London, England (1870–2013)

Coordinates: 51.50062°N 0.133711°W

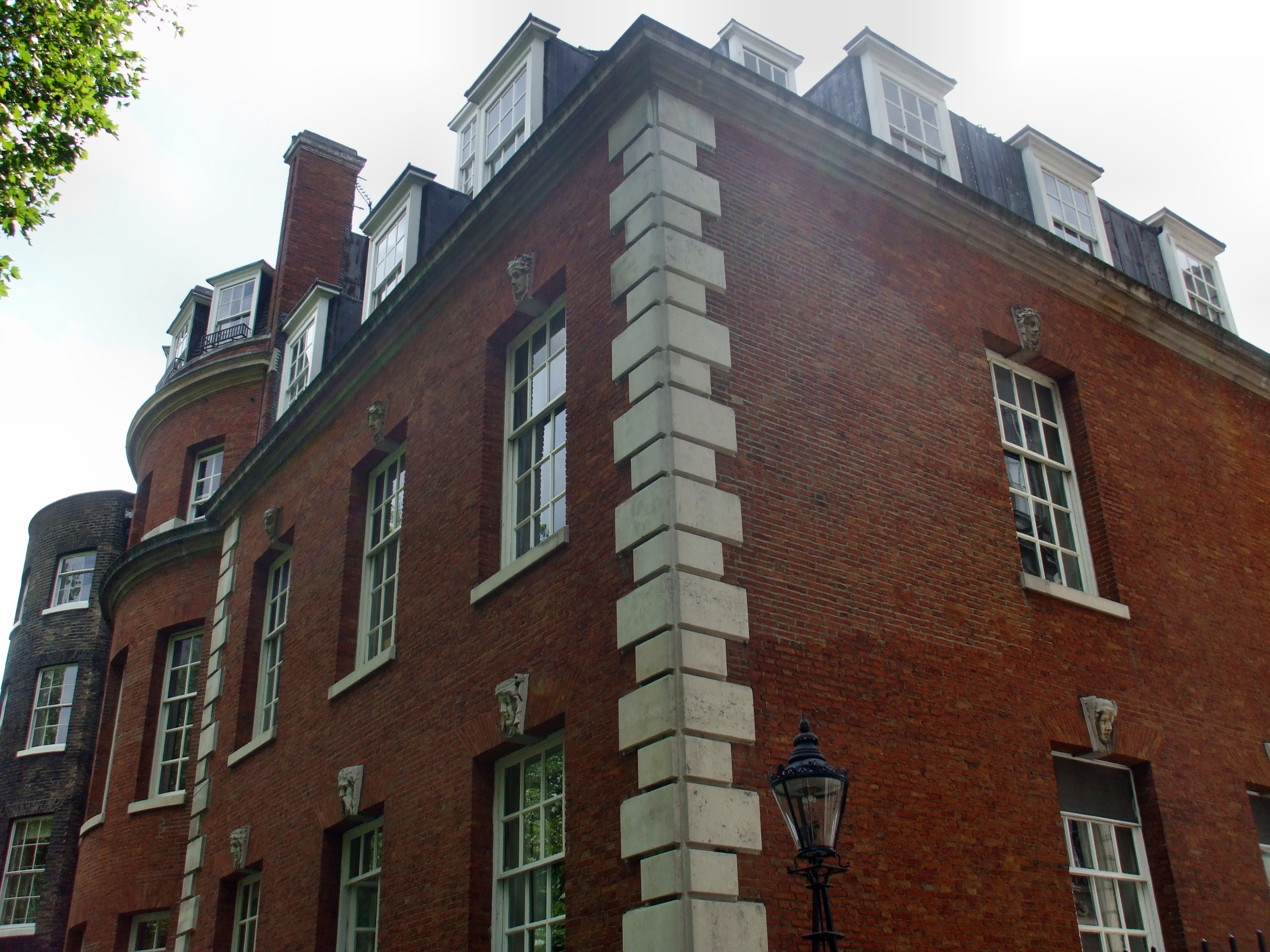
The exterior of the building

St Stephen's Club was a private member's club in Westminster, London, founded in 1870.

St Stephen's was originally on the corner of Bridge Street and the Embankment, in London SW1, now the location of Portcullis House. From 1962 it occupied a building at 34 Queen Anne's Gate, overlooking Birdcage Walk and St James's Park.

According to Charles Dickens Jr., writing in 1879:

St Stephen’s Club, Victoria Embankment, S. W. — The only persons eligible for membership are those who profess and maintain Constitutional and Conservative principles. The committee have power to select for ballot twenty candidates annually from those duly proposed and seconded, who shall be called selected members. The election of members is by ballot in committee. Entrance fee, £31 10s.; subscription, £10 10s.

== History ==
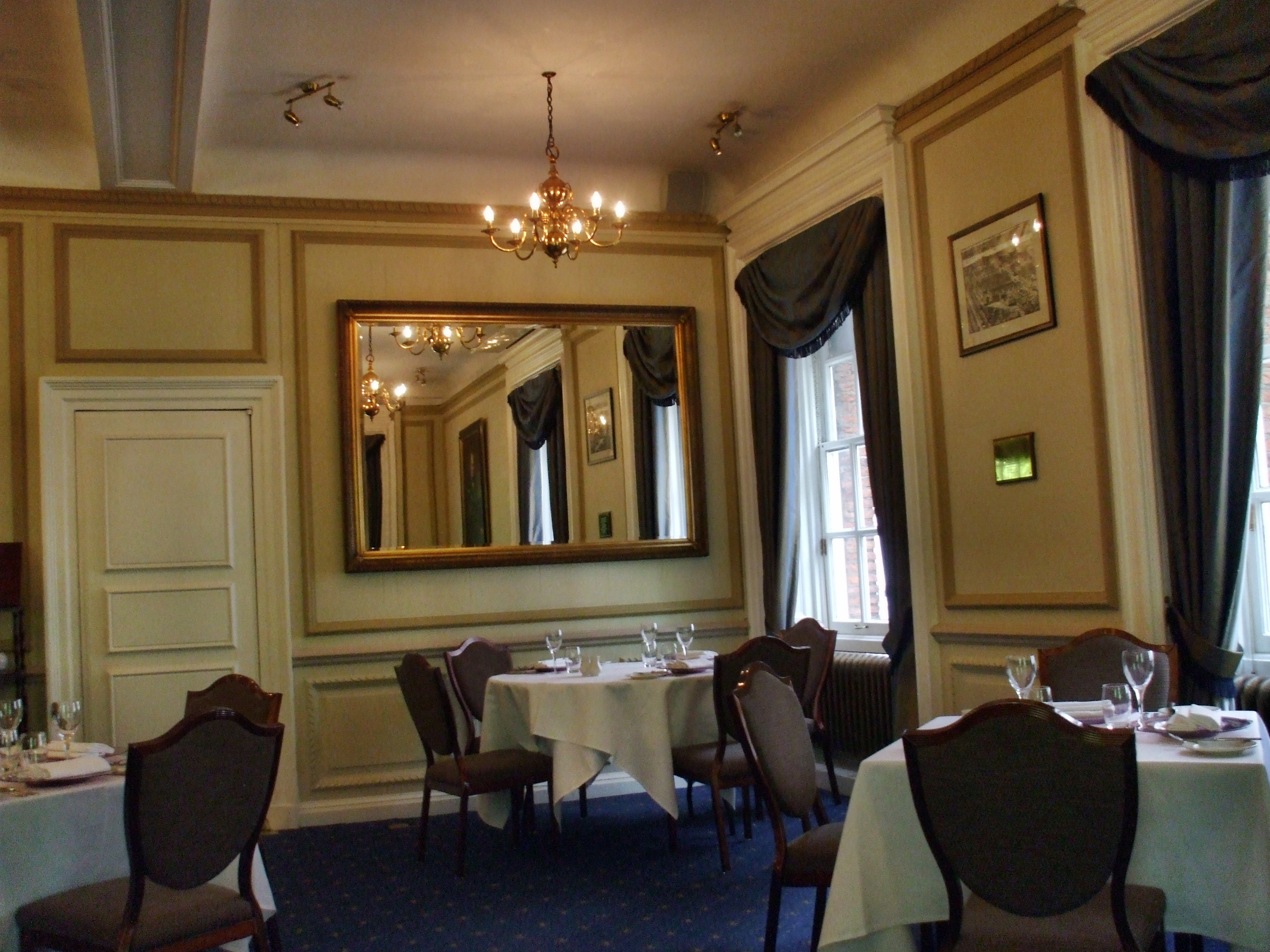
A dining room inside the club

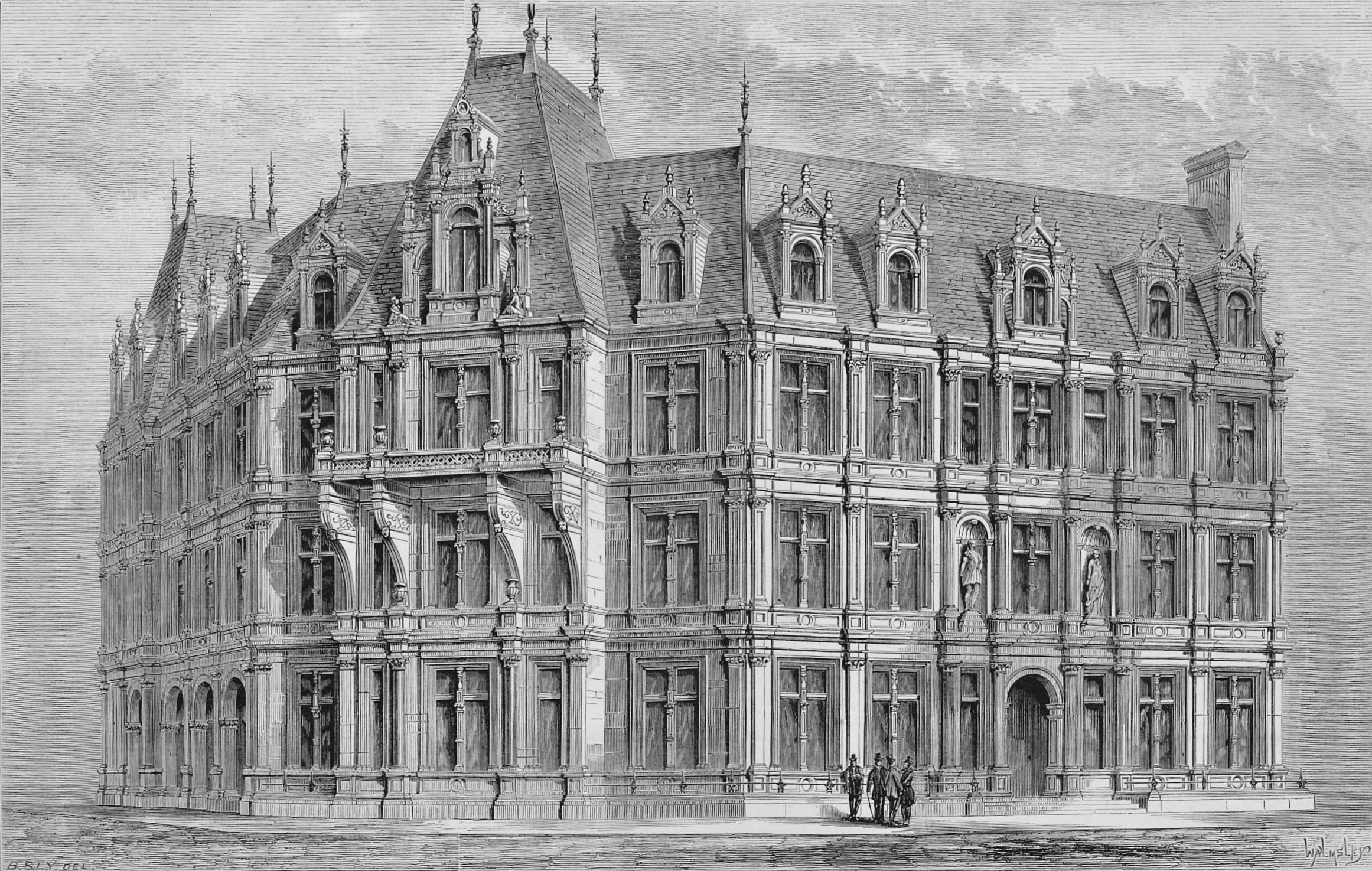
The 1874 clubhouse at Bridge Street and Victoria Embankment, designed by John Whichcord Jr. It was demolished in 1994.

Taking its name from St Stephen's Chapel, the original meeting place of the Commons which burned down in 1834, the club was initially connected with Conservative Party Members of Parliament and civil engineers. Benjamin Disraeli, twice Prime Minister of the United Kingdom, was among the founding fathers.

On 14 January 1886, six Irish Conservative MPs, led by Colonel E.J. Saunderson from County Cavan, met at the St. Stephen's Club to form a distinct Parliamentary Ulster party - what was to become the Ulster Unionist Party.

The original premises were sold to the government in the early 1960s and the club moved to 34 Queen Anne's Gate, the former private house of Lord Glenconner, in 1962.

The club was reopened at Queen Anne's Gate by Harold Macmillan, then prime minister. Traditionally the chairman of the Conservative Party was the club's president.

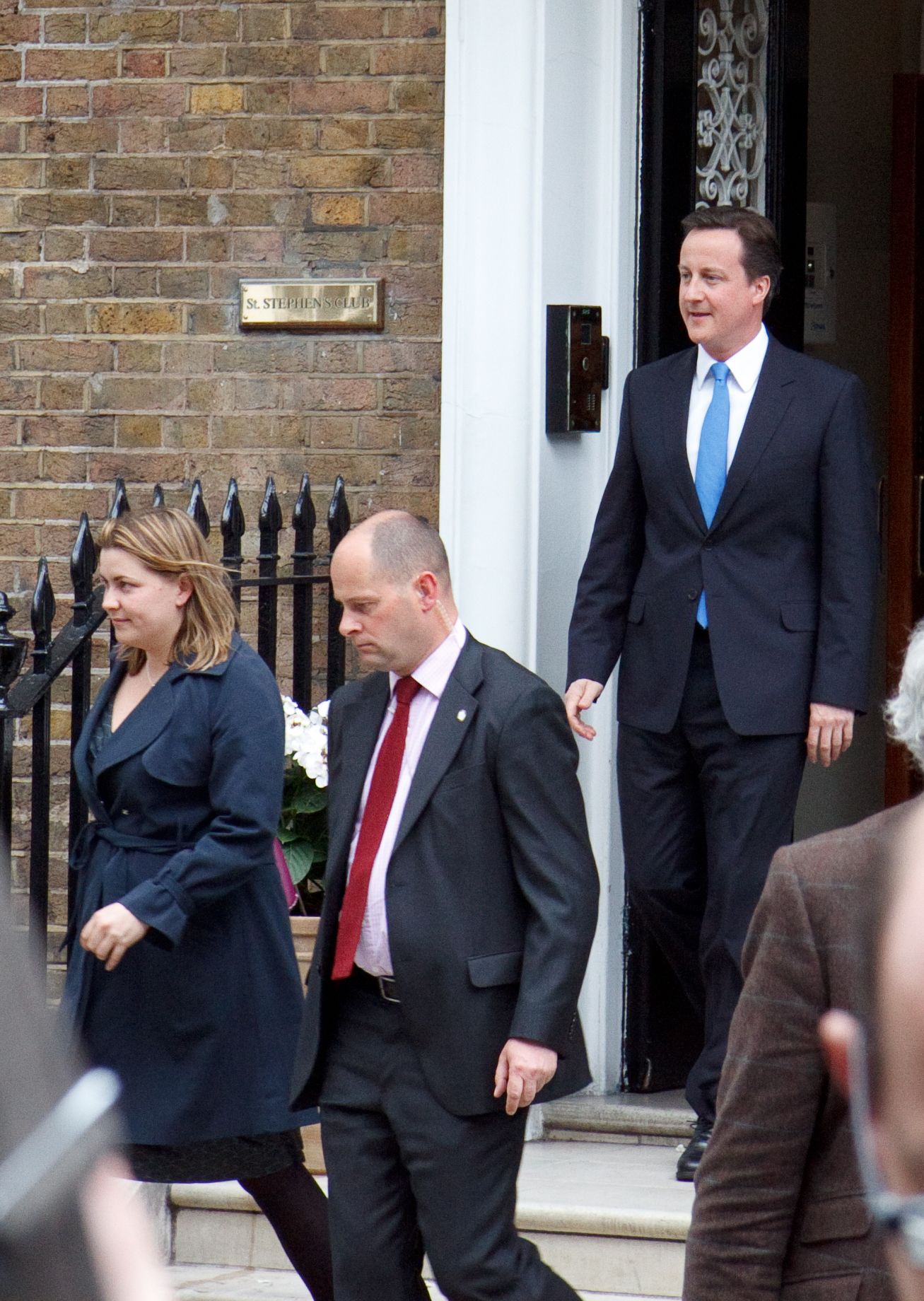
The prime minister of the United Kingdom, David Cameron, leaving the St Stephen's Club

The club closed as a proprietary membership club and was acquired in January 2003 by James Wilson and Myra Jauncey. It became officially apolitical and operated as a private members' luncheon club and venue for evening functions.

However, it retained an unofficial connection with the Conservative Party. Notably, on 7 May 2010, David Cameron chose the club as the venue to make the "big offer" to the Liberal Democrats for a coalition government which resulted in the coalition government under the leadership of David Cameron as Prime Minister and Liberal Democrat leader Nick Clegg as Deputy Prime Minister. As of 2012 Lord McAlpine kept his London wine collection in the cellar.

On 2 January 2013 the club closed due to lack of members and soaring running costs having struggled to attract new members due to the economic climate and changing attitudes to London Clubs.

== See also ==
- List of members' clubs in London
