= Jon Dellandrea =

Canadian author (born 1949)

Jon Samuel Dellandrea, CM (born October 8, 1949) is a Canadian author and art historian, and a former hospital foundation executive and university executive and educator. He is a senior fellow at Massey College, chair emeritus of the Art Canada Institute, and a Member of the Order of Canada. The CEO of the Sunnybrook Health Sciences Centre Foundation in Toronto from 2012 to 2021, Dellandrea has formerly held the positions of pro-vice-chancellor (development and external affairs) at the University of Oxford, and vice president of advancement at the University of Toronto, and was chancellor of Nipissing University from 2006 to 2012.

== Biography ==
Dellandrea was raised in Northern Ontario, Canada. His father Aubrey was a Plymouth Brethren preacher who in the 1960s started the Heavenly Sunshine Broadcast. He attended high school in North Bay, Ontario, where he met his wife, Lyne Edwards. They married shortly before moving to Toronto, where they both attended the University of Toronto, where he played Canadian football and was drafted by the Winnipeg Blue Bombers in the 1972 CFL draft. Dellandrea received his BA (English literature) from Scarborough College, both his MEd and EdD from the University of Toronto (Ontario Institute for Studies in Education). (He would later also receive an honorary degree from Oxford University.) The couple moved to Waterloo, Ontario, in 1979 to raise their two sons, Matthew and Brendan, and for Dellandrea to take a position at the University of Waterloo. During this time, Dellandrea took on a central development role, culminating in his appointment to the newly created position of vice-president of university development in 1983.

After serving Waterloo, Dellandrea spent five years as president of the Mount Sinai Hospital Foundation. In 1994 Dellandrea returned to the University of Toronto to serve as its vice-president and chief advancement officer, a position he held for 11 years. The initial goal had been to launch a fundraising campaign for C$300 million to establish more endowed chairs and student aid. By the time the campaign was publicly announced in 1997, most of the $300 million had already been raised under the leadership of Dellandrea and then-President Robert Prichard. The goal was reset at $400 million, and then later reset at $575 million. By the 2000 departure of President Prichard, the university had raised $705 million. The campaign was extended to the year 2004, with a new target of $1 billion. Dellandrea and his team surpassed the $1 billion goal a year ahead of schedule, and the campaign closed in excess of $1.2 billion. The number of endowed chairs grew from 15 to 175, with an additional 80 joint hospital-U of T chairs established during the campaign. As a result of the campaign, endowed student aid rose from $68.7 million in 1995 to $463 million in 2004.

In October 2005, Dellandrea was appointed pro-vice-chancellor (development and external affairs) of Oxford University. By May 2008, Oxford University announced a $2.5-billion campaign (USD). It was announced on July 29, 2008, following media speculation of a disagreement between Dellandrea and Oxford volunteer and donor Michael Moritz, that Dr Dellandrea would leave his post at Oxford in Autumn 2008 to take up a series of international consultancies.

Dellandrea has sat on or chaired numerous boards and foundations, including the Canadian Council for the Advancement of Education (1985–86), Youth Assisting Youth (1979), the Canadian Clay and Glass Gallery (1988–92), Art Canada Institute, the Library and Archives Canada Foundation, and the Right to Play Canadian Advisory Board. Dellandrea is a member of the board of directors of the Council for Canadian Unity, the board of Mount Sinai Hospital (Toronto), and former member of the board of the Canadian Bureau for International Education.

Dellandrea held faculty appointments at the University of Waterloo, the Division of Management and Economics at the University of Toronto Scarborough and the Rotman School of Management at the University of Toronto.

== Awards ==
Dellandrea was the 1996 recipient of the Outstanding Fundraising Executive Award, given by the Toronto chapter of the National Society of Fundraising Executives. In 1999 the Canadian Council for the Advancement of Education awarded him their "prestigious" Outstanding Achievement Award.

In 2001 he became the first Canadian to receive the Laureate Award of the Institute for Charitable Giving in the United States.

Dellandrea was appointed as a member of the Order of Canada in 2006 for his contributions to higher education.

On June 18, 2008, Dellandrea was awarded an honorary doctor of laws by the University of Toronto "for his transformative influence on the advancement profession and the culture of philanthropy in Canada and internationally".

== Authorship ==
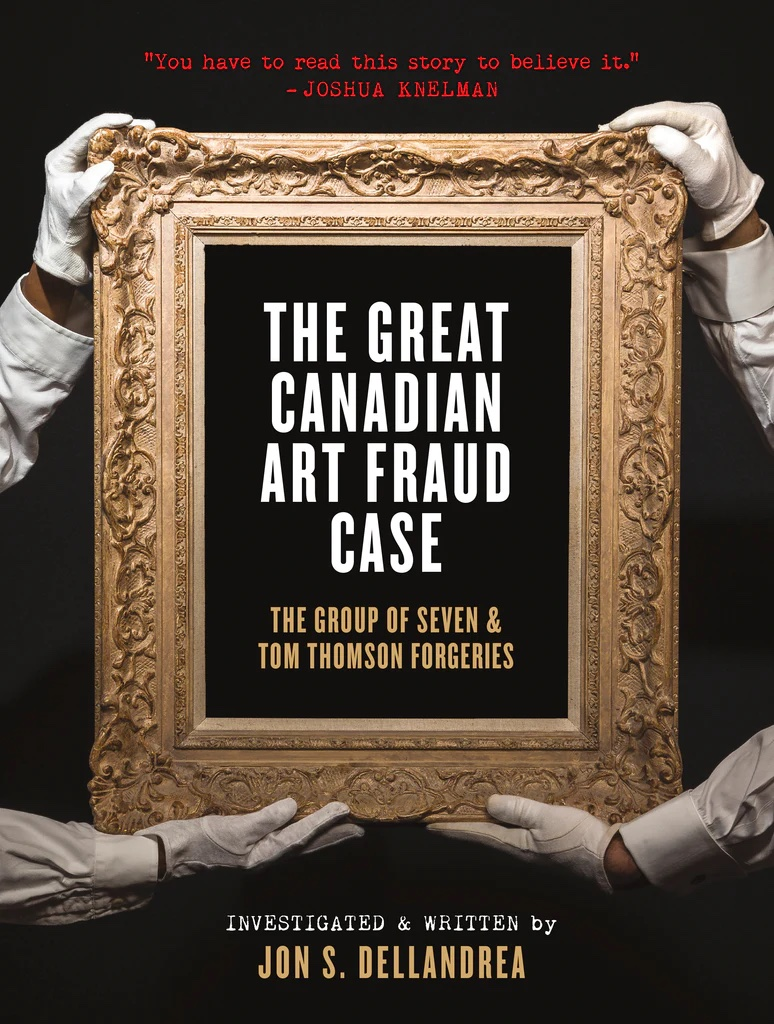
Cover image of The Great Canadian Art Fraud Case: The Group of Seven & Tom Thomson Forgeries, by Jon S. Dellandrea, published in 2022 by Goose Lane Editions

Since 2017, Dellandrea has written about art fraud and forgeries, with contributions to several magazines and the publication of a book.

An article written by Dellandrea was published in the July–August 2017 edition of the Literary Review of Canada. Entitled Brush with Infamy, Dellandrea details his discovery of William Firth MacGregor, a forgotten artist who played a part as a central witness in the Canadian Art Fraud Case of 1962 to 1964. The article also details Dellandrea's "unlikely journey" as an historian into "Canada's biggest art fraud case."

In 2021, a piece by Dellandrea entitled Ingenious Imitations was featured on the cover of Canada's History. In it, he reveals that many works attributed to Cornelius Krieghoff are actually forgeries, and reveals the motives and dealings of the artists and brokers of the fakes.

The Great Canadian Art Fraud Case: The Group of Seven & Tom Thomson Forgeries by Dr. Jon S. Dellandrea was published in October, 2022, by Goose Lane Editions. This non-fiction work "takes readers back to 1962, a time when forgeries were turning up on gallery walls, in auction houses, and (unwittingly) being hung in the homes of luminaries across Canada." Fifty years later, Dellandrea follows the work of Inspector James Erskine with the help of A. J. Casson, the youngest living member of the Group of Seven, to uncover the masterminds behind the forgeries.

== See also ==
- List of University of Waterloo people
- List of University of Toronto people
