= William Firth MacGregor =

Scottish-Canadian painter

- Born: 1896; Scotland
- Occupation: Painter

William Firth MacGregor (1896–1958/73) was a painter, illustrator, and artist who immigrated to Canada in 1925. MacGregor was a central witness in the Canadian Art Fraud case of 1962 to 1964, which Toronto art dealer and owner of the Haynes Art Gallery in Toronto, Leslie W. Lewis and art dealer Neil Sharkey were convicted of fraud and sentenced to prison. More than 30 paintings, made by MacGregor, were admitted as evidence in the trial, all bearing fake signatures of Tom Thomson, A.Y. Jackson, J.E.H. MacDonald, James Wilson Morrice, David Milne or Arthur Lismer. Details of MacGregor's life and the art fraud case that he became embroiled in are documented in The Great Canadian Art Fraud Case: The Group of Seven & Tom Thomson Forgeries, a non-fiction book by Jon Dellandrea.
