= Frog Pocket =

Scottish musician

- Born: John Charles Wilson
- Origin: Ayr, Scotland, UK
- Genres: Electronic music, Experimental music, folk music, Noise
- Years active: 1999–present
- Labels: Planet Mu, Mouthmoth, Benbecula Records
- Website: http://www.frogpocket.com/

Frog Pocket is the recording name of John Charles Wilson, a Scottish musician. He is currently signed to Mike Paradinas' record label Planet Mu. He also runs his own record label, Mouthmoth. Wilson mixes elements of folk with electronica and often uses fast, noisy and complicated beats in his songs. His songs usually incorporate violin and guitar (often using harmonics).

== Notable releases ==
=== Full length albums ===
Title	Release	Label
You're The One For Me	1999	Mouthmoth
My Favourite	2000	Mouthmoth
Caric Kils	2002	Afe Records – afe035lcd, Mouthmoth – moth13
Moon Mountain of the Fords	2003	Benbecula Records
Gonglot	2005	Planet Mu
Come On Primates Show Your Teeth!	2007	Planet Mu
Frog and the Volcano!	2012	Mouthmoth

=== EPs ===
Title	Release	Label
Fir Faas	2003	Planet Mu

=== Compilations ===
Title	Release	Label
Children of Mu	2004	Planet Mu

=== Guest appearances ===
Title	Artist	Release	Label
Native	Albanatchie	1996	Lochshore
