= Ochre (musician) =

English electronic musician

- Born: Christopher Scott Leary; 1979 (age 46–47)
- Origin: Manchester, England
- Genres: Electronic; IDM; Ambient; Folktronica
- Occupation: Musician
- Years active: 2001–present
- Labels: Benbecula Records; Toytronic Records
- Website: ochremusic.com

Ochre is the stage name of English electronic musician Christopher Scott Leary. The name "Ochre" was originally adopted as the title for Leary's academic work while studying audio production at Newcastle College, as a variation of "Oaker", being the name of a street in Manchester where Leary spent his early childhood. He currently resides in The Hague. Leary also holds a Master's degree in music.

Ochre has had his music licensed for use in computer games, such as Sony's LittleBigPlanet 2, Psyonix's Whizzle, and Euclidean Crisis. Leary has also composed music for the animated documentary Centrefold, and has produced music for commercial projects by Google, Skoda, and Orange.

== Discography ==
=== Albums ===
- AudioMicroDevice – 2001 (no label)
- A Midsummer Nice Dream – 2004, Toytronic Records
- Lemodie – 2006, Benbecula Records
- Like Dust of the Balance – 2009, Benbecula Records
- Early Learning – 2011, (no label)
- National Ignition – 2013, Aura Materia
- Beyond the Outer Loop – 2017, Aura Materia
- Project Caelus – 2018, Aura Materia
- Understory – 2020, Aura Materia
- An Eye to Windward – 2021
- Oversail – 2026

=== EP ===
- Death of an Aura EP – 2008, Benbecula Records
- Petl EP – 2009, Baselogic
- Isolette EP - 2015, Aura Materia
- Night Cycle EP - 2025, Traum Schallplatten
