= Grand Brighton Hotel =

Hotel in Brighton, England

The Grand Brighton
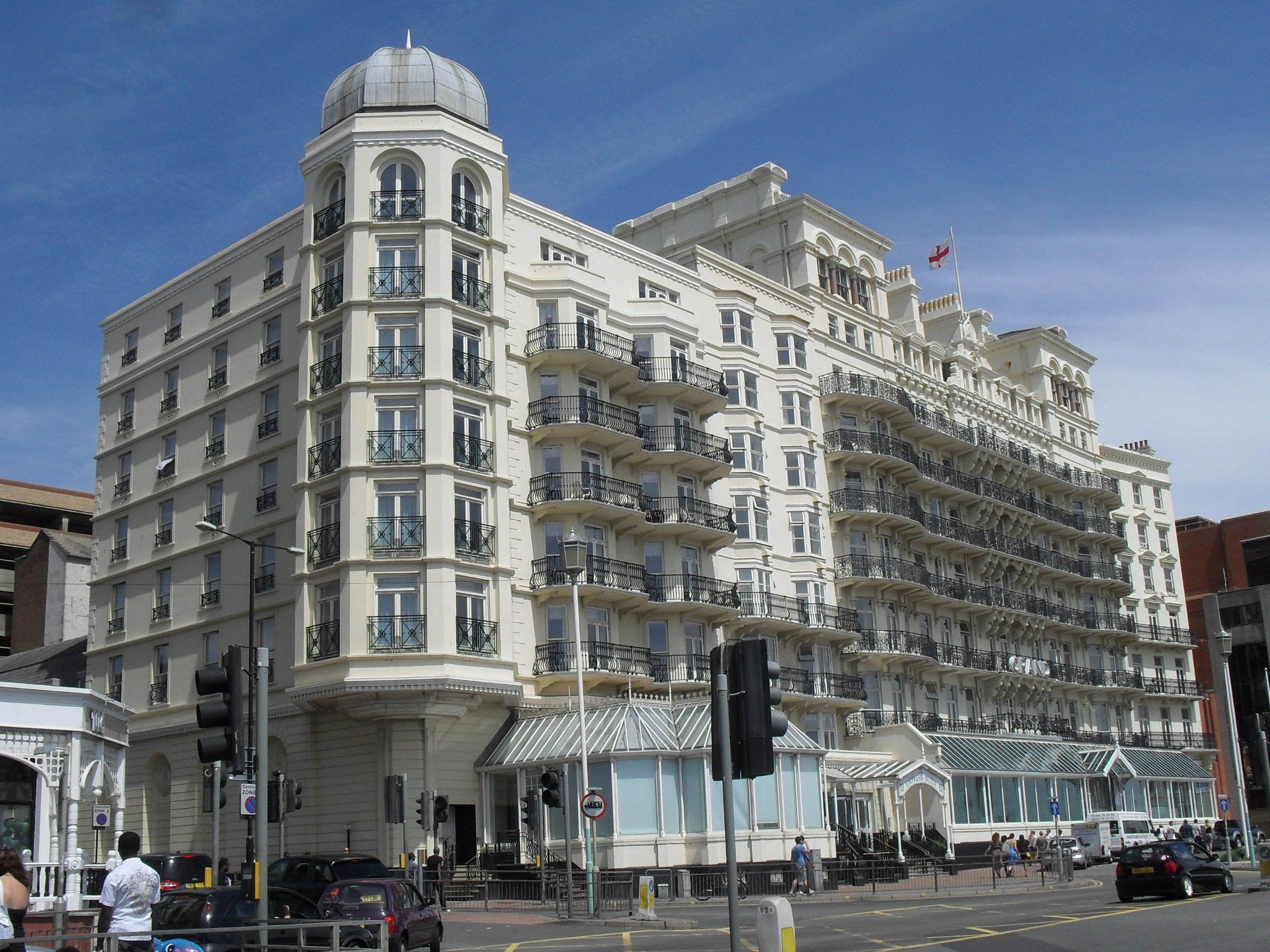
- The Grand Brighton Hotel from the southwest (July 2010)

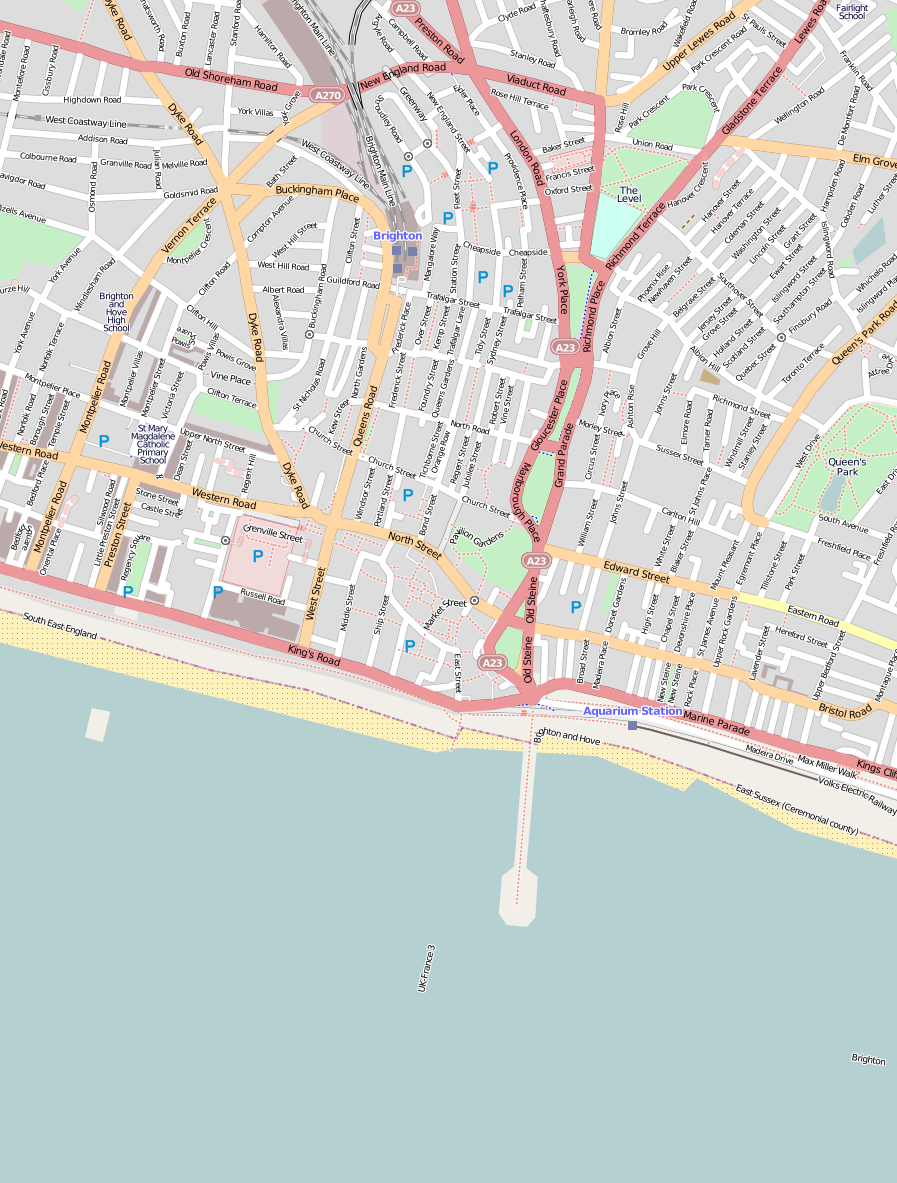
- Location along the waterfront of Brighton
- Hotel chain: Leonardo Hotels

General information
- Location: Brighton, United Kingdom, 97-99 Kings Road, Brighton BN1 2FW
- Coordinates: 50°49′17″N 0°08′50″W
- Opening: 21 July 1864

Design and construction
- Architect: John Whichcord Jr.
- Developer: Lewis Glenton

Other information
- Number of rooms: 201

Website
- https://www.grandbrighton.co.uk/

The Grand Brighton Hotel is a Victorian seafront hotel in Brighton on the south coast of England. Designed by John Whichcord Jr. and built in 1864 by Lewis Glenton, it was intended for members of the upper classes visiting the town and remains one of Brighton's most expensive hotels.

During the 1984 Conservative Party conference the hotel was bombed by the Provisional Irish Republican Army (IRA) in an attempt to assassinate the prime minister, Margaret Thatcher.

== History ==
The Grand Hotel was designed by the architect John Whichcord Jr. and built in 1864 by Lewis Glenton on the site occupied previously by the West Battery at Artillery Place, one of Brighton's 18th-century coastal fortifications. It was built for members of the upper classes visiting Brighton and Hove and remains one of the most expensive hotels in the city. Among its advanced engineering features at the time was the ‘Ascending Omnibus’, a hydraulically powered lift powered by cisterns in the roof. This was the first lift built in the United Kingdom outside London, at a time when only two others had been installed. The building itself is an example of Italian influence in Victorian architecture.

=== 1984 bombing ===
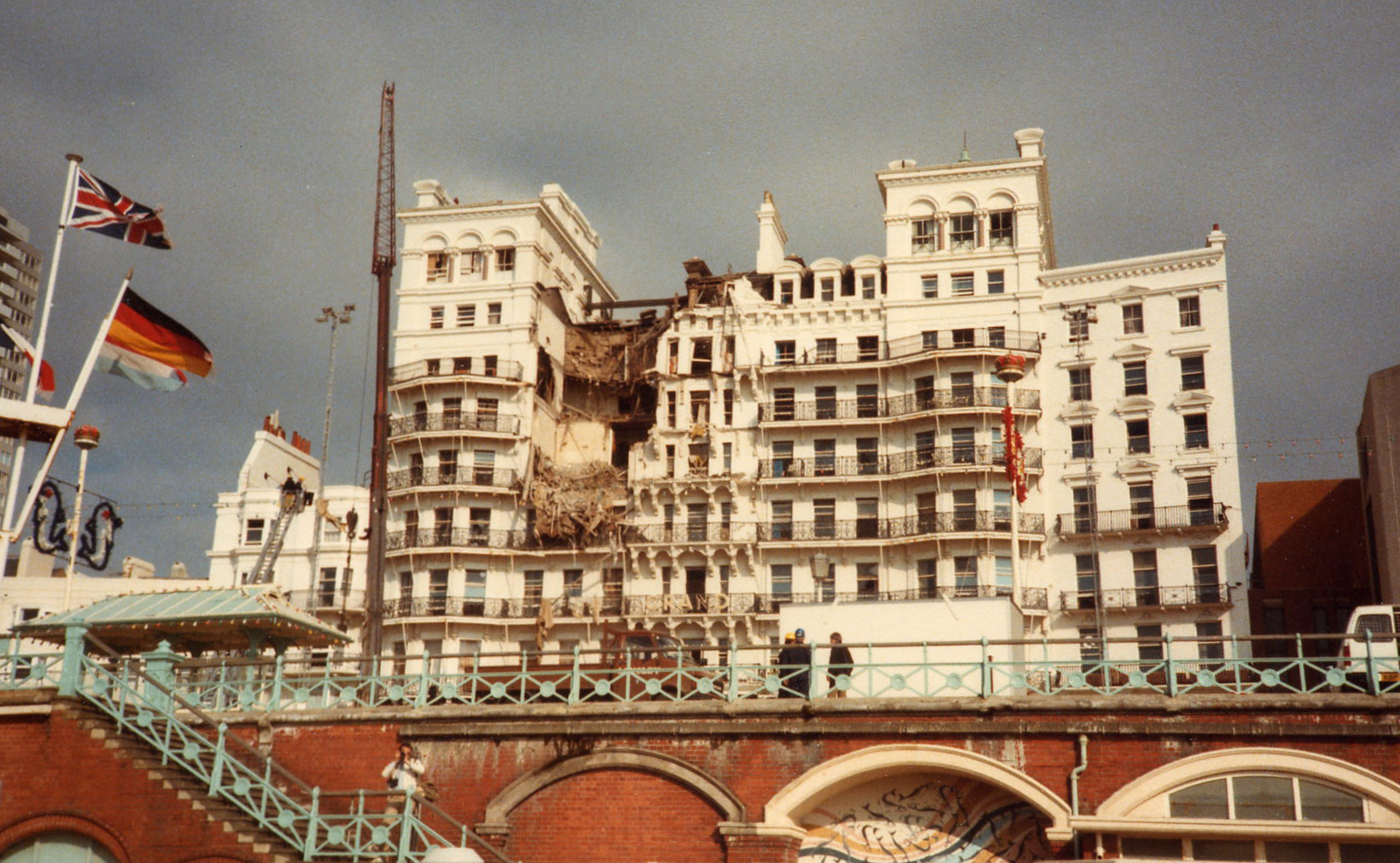
The hotel following the 1984 bombing

The hotel was bombed by the Provisional Irish Republican Army (IRA) in the early morning of 12 October 1984 in an attempt to assassinate the prime minister, Margaret Thatcher, during the Conservative Party conference. The bomb exploded at 2:51am. It had been hidden three weeks earlier behind the bath panel of room 629.

Thatcher survived the bombing but five other people were killed in the attack, including Roberta Wakeham, wife of the government's Chief Whip, John Wakeham, and the Conservative MP Sir Anthony Berry. Norman Tebbit, a member of the Cabinet, was injured, along with his wife, Margaret, who was left paralysed. Thatcher insisted that the conference open on time the next day and made her speech as planned in defiance of the bombers, a gesture that was supported across the political spectrum.

The hotel was reopened on 28 August 1986. The ceremony was attended by Thatcher, who spoke at a reception to celebrate the reopening. Tebbit accompanied her. Concorde flew low from the south to salute the opening.

=== Later history ===
The hotel belonged to the De Vere Group from the 1990s. De Vere undertook a multimillion-pound refurbishment which was completed in 2013. Another refurbishment project concluded in 2019.

On 15 October 2011 the Grand Hotel was inducted into the Brighton Walk of Fame and is only the third structure in Brighton to be recognised by the Walk of Fame committee. The hotel has hosted many famous guests, including Abba, who celebrated in the appropriately named Napoleon Suite on the first floor following their 1974 Eurovision Song Contest win with their performance of "Waterloo". Others who have performed in The Grand's Empress Suite include singer Jessie J, Rizzle Kicks, The Saturdays, Elbow and Sugababes.

De Vere Hotels sold the Grand in 2014 to Wittington Investments for £50 million. It was sold again to Leonardo Hotels, part of the Fattal Group, in February 2023.

== Facilities ==
There are 201 rooms in the hotel, including eight singles, 115 standard twin and standard double rooms, 31 sea-view twin and sea-view double rooms, 42 sea-view deluxe rooms and four sea-view suites, including the Presidential Suite. It offers conference facilities for up to 1,000 delegates. The Empress Suite is the country's largest sea-facing conference suite. It is commonly used as a venue for weddings, along with the hotel's Regent room (a former Victorian library) and first-floor suites.

The Grand Brighton hotel is also home to Cyan restaurant and bar, an all-day dining spot which still features original 155-year-old marble pillars around its central bar area.

== Management ==
The current manager is Andrew Mosley, who joined the hotel in May 2010.

The Grand has been praised for its industry-leading approach to management of employee engagement in the hospitality industry, winning 'Best Employer in UK Hospitality' at the 2019 Cateys award ceremony hosted by The Caterer.

== Film and television appearances ==
Amongst many appearances in television and film the Grand was visited by the Trotter family in 1992 in an episode of the BBC Television comedy Only Fools and Horses entitled Mother Nature's Son. The hotel has also been featured in ITV's Coronation Street.

The hotel was the subject of the documentary The Grand written and presented by Robert Longden for Southern Television.

In the film Quadrophenia it was the hotel where Sting's character, Ace Face, was a bellboy.

== See also ==
- Grade II listed buildings in Brighton and Hove: E–H

== Bibliography ==
- Antram, Nicholas; Morrice, Richard (2008). Brighton and Hove. Pevsner Architectural Guides. London: Yale University Press. ISBN 978-0-300-12661-7.
- Collis, Rose (2010). The New Encyclopaedia of Brighton. (based on the original by Tim Carder) (1st ed.). Brighton: Brighton & Hove Libraries. ISBN 978-0-9564664-0-2.
