= Birdengine =

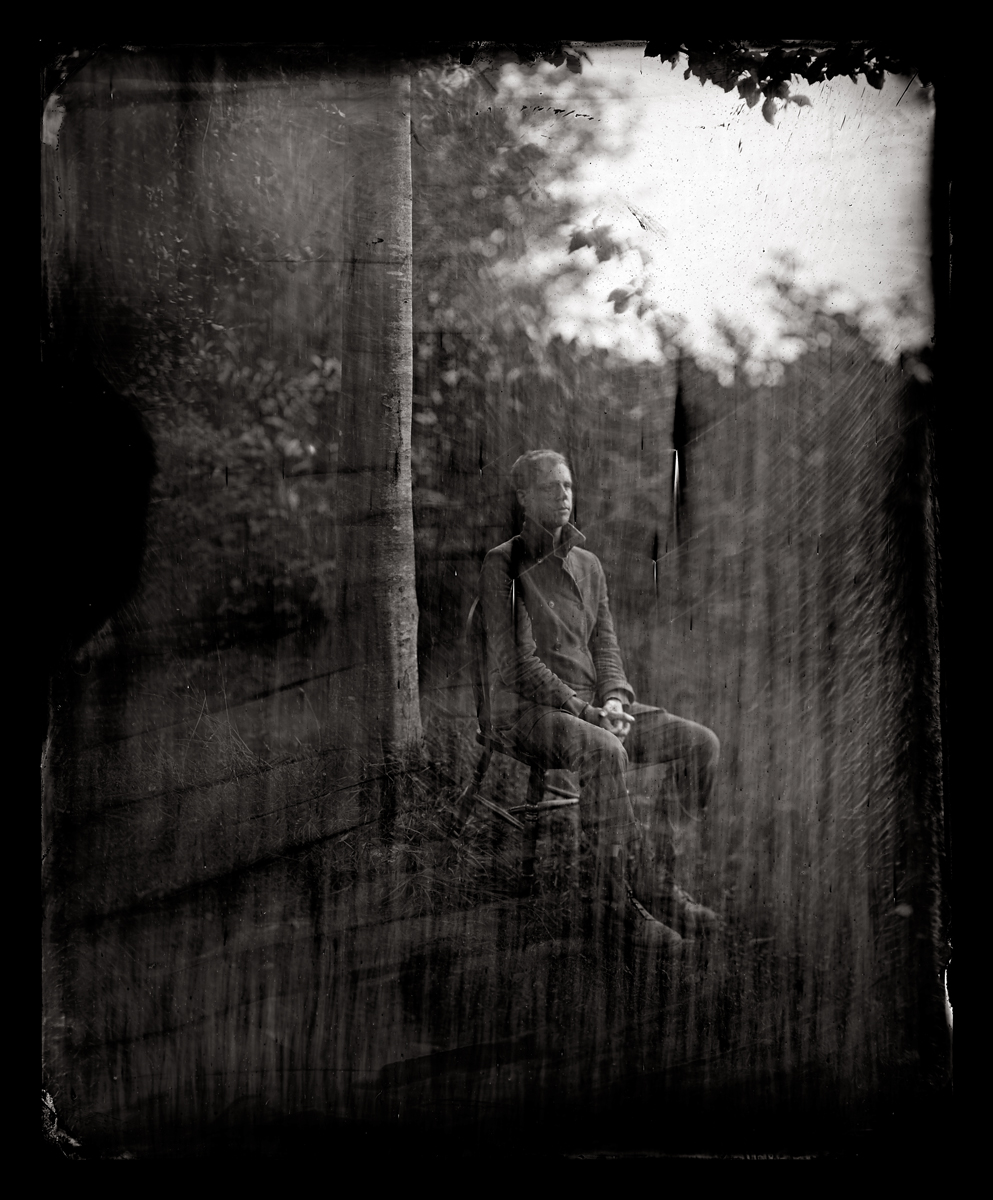
- Birdengine at End Of The Road Festival 2008

Background information
- Born: Lawry Joseph Tilbury
- Origin: United Kingdom
- Genres: Experimental, Freak Folk, Found sound
- Instruments: Guitar, vocals, sampler, synthesizer
- Years active: 2005— present
- Labels: Benbecula Records, Drift Records, Bleeding Heart Records, Thee Evil Twin, Eyeless Records
- Website: lawrytilbury.com

Lawry Joseph Tilbury, also known as Birdengine, is an English musician, producer and singer-songwriter .

== Career ==
In 2005, Tilbury released his debut EP Birdengine, a collection of experimental tape melodies, on the now defunct Scottish label Benbecula Records. The self-produced EP was hailed as "the first relevant work of freak-folktronica" by Stylus Magazine.

Another EP Early 4-track recordings (2006) was released on Benbecula, with several reviewers noting Tilbury's "natural talent for story telling".

In 2007, Independent label Drift Records released I Fed Thee Rabbit Water, a mini-album of wandering folk songs which garnered Tilbury praise for his stark nylon guitar playing, and deadpan humour "There's not likely to be a more arresting opening couplet to an album this year":

I spent the Summer cutting Heads off Dogs,
I spent the Winter trying to sew them back on
- Heads Off Dogs, I Fed Thee Rabbit Water

Tilbury spent 2010 recording songs to a 16 track reel-to-reel tape player. These sessions culminated in the debut full-length LP The Crooked Mile and a later EP I Like Totally Do Not Understand Or Whatever, released in 2011 by Bleeding Hearts Records and A Beard of Snails Records respectively. The Crooked Mile garnered widely positive reviews, and was described by Uncut as "...like a waltz for the dead – the results are unmistakable and unsettling.", and by The Quietus as "Outsider Music, riddled with themes of alienation and a sense of not belonging; an outcast even among the freaks".

Following a 10 year hiatus, Birdengine released his third album SOMNAM in 2021. SOMNAM contains themes of grief, sleep and nostalgia and utilises tape loops, vocal sampling, warped distorted synthesis and organic rhythms created using found sound. Later in 2021 Birdengine released the mini-album BRUTAL, 9 very different pieces from solo piano sketches to distorted heavy synth via church organ and field recordings.

Birdengine's live performances have been described as "both unnerving and intriguing in equal measures", having "strange and compelling beauty" and a "bizarre, yet deeply likeable tone".

== Discography ==
=== Studio albums ===
- I Fed Thee Rabbit Water (2007, Drift Records)
- The Crooked Mile (2011, Bleeding Heart Recordings)
- SOMNAM (2021, Eyeless Records)

=== EPs ===
- Birdengine EP (2005, Benbecula Records)
- Early 4 Track Recordings EP (2006, Benbecula Records)
- Black Dictaphone EP (2009, Thee Evil Twin)
- I Like Totally Do Not Understand Or Whatever EP (2011, A Beard of Snails Records)
- No Arms And No Friends / Ghost Club (2011, Lynch(ed) Recordings)

=== Compilations ===
- Deathbead Footage Committee Demos (2015, Thee Evil Twin)
- BRUTAL (2021, Thee Evil Twin)

=== With other musicians ===
- Trunk (credited as 'Mortis Tobias & Clara Kindle') (2008, with Daniel Clark)
