= Kevin Meredith =

British photographer

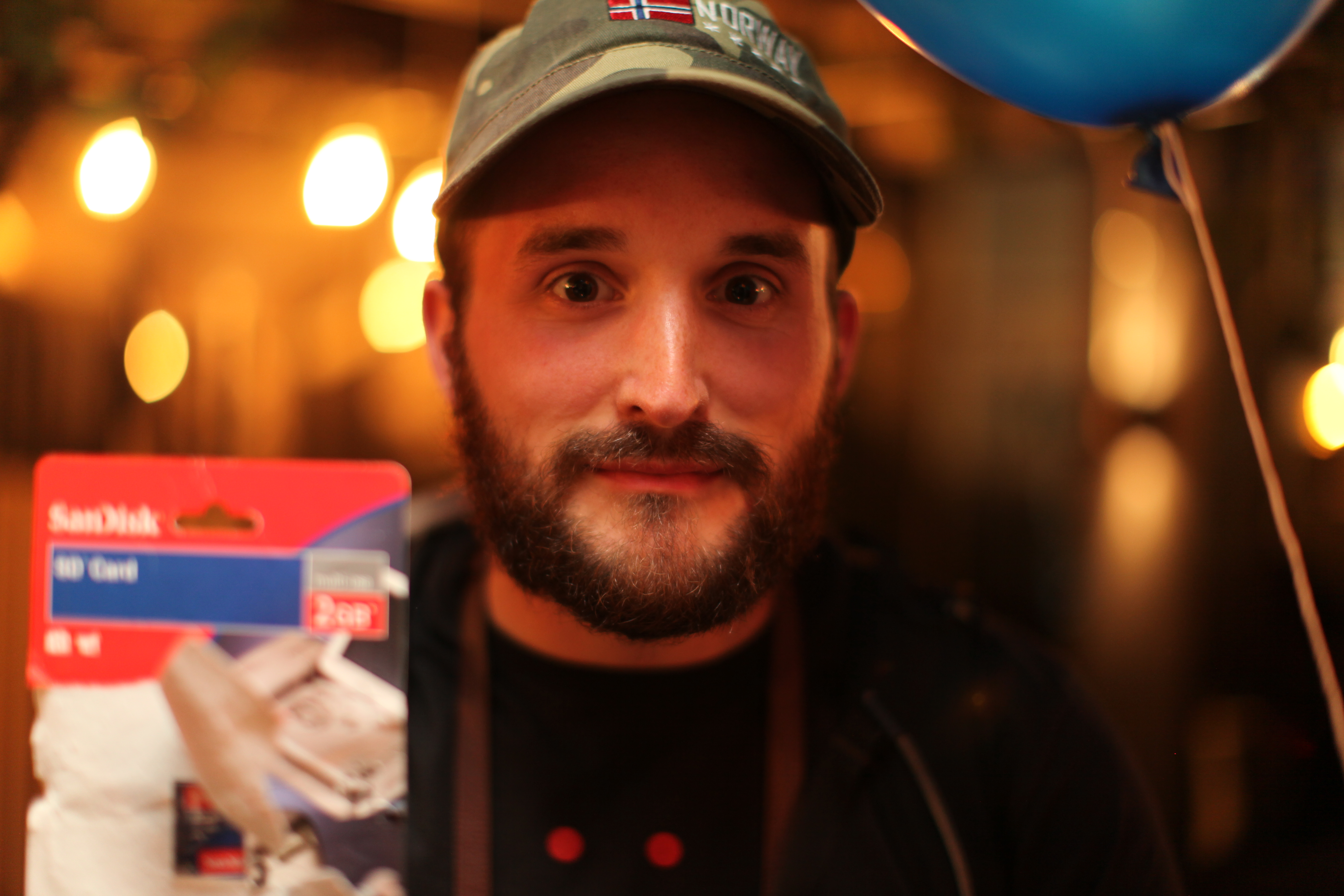
- Born: 1978 (age 47–48); Folkestone, Kent, UK
- Occupation: Photographer
- Website: lomokev.com

Kevin Meredith (born 1978), also known as Lomokev, is a British photographer and writer, living in Brighton. He is known for his use of the Lomo LC-A camera and his lomographic style.

Meredith has produced three books on photography: Hot Shots (2008), 52 Photographic Projects (2010, titled Photo Op in the USA) and Toy Cameras, Creative Photos (2011, titled Fantastic Plastic Cameras in the USA).

== Life and work ==
Meredith grew up in Folkestone, England and began photographing at age 16. He started using a Lomo LC-A in 1998 and gained notoriety for his use of this camera, often in Brighton, and for his use of social media as a tool to promote his photography, specifically Flickr.

His portrait montages appeared in the monthly Brighton Source magazine for four years. He teaches photography courses using the Lomo LC-A, has given talks at venues internationally and works as a commercial photographer. He lives in Brighton.

== Publications ==
=== Publications by Meredith ===
- Hot Shots. Brighton & Hove: Rotovision, 2008. ISBN 978-2-88893-027-3. UK edition.
  - Hot Shots. San Francisco, CA: Chronicle, 2009. ISBN 978-0-8118-6640-8. US edition.
  - How to Take Better Photos. Revised edition. Brighton and Hove: Rotovision, 2018. ISBN 9782888933472. (Note: Its web page is here.)
- 52 Photographic Projects
  - Brighton and Hove: Rotovision, 2010. ISBN 978-2-88893-070-9. UK edition.
  - Photo Op: 52 Inspirational Projects for the Adventurous Image Maker. Waltham, MA: Focal, 2010. ISBN 978-0-240-81400-1. US edition.
- Toy Cameras, Creative Photos: High-end Results from 40 Plastic Cameras.
  - Brighton & Hove: Rotovision, 2011. ISBN 978-2-888931188. UK edition.
  - Fantastic Plastic Cameras: Tips and Tricks for 40 Toy Cameras. San Francisco, CA: Chronicle, 2011. ISBN 978-0811877534. US edition.
- I Dare the Wave, a Life to Save. Brighton and Hove: Miniclick, 2014. Edition of 50 copies. Photographs of Brighton Swimming Club. 1 of 5 publications collectively titled The Miniclick Press Volume 1 / Brighton. The other publications are by Ondra Loup, Kristina Sälgvik, Jack Latham and Jean-Luc Brouard.

=== Publications with contributions by Meredith ===
- Spirit of Friendship. By Colin Edward Offland. Manchester: Chief, 2002. ISBN 0-9543279-0-X.
- Don't Think Just Shoot. London: Booth-Clibborn, 2007. ISBN 978-1-86154-230-4.
- Joachim Schmid Is Martin Parr · Martin Parr Is Joachim Schmid. Self-published by Joachim Schmid, 2009.
- Archives / Memories: Brighton Swimming Club: 1860–2013. Brighton Swimming Club, 2013. Edited by Lindy Dunlop.
- Toy Tokyo. Kingyo, 2014. Edited by Manami Okazaki. ISBN 978-9881250780.

== Exhibitions ==
=== Solo exhibitions ===
- The Daily Swim, The Eagle, Brighton, 2009
- The Old Market, Hove, 2011

=== Group exhibitions ===
- Austen room, British Airways i360, Brighton. A permanent exhibition from April 2017 with photographs by Meredith, Gary Eastwood, and Paul Raftery.

== Awards ==
- Second place, the Lomolympics 2000, Tokyo, 2000
- Third place, Lomographic World Congress, Vienna, 2002
