= Francis Tillstone =

English civic official

Francis John Tillstone (c. 1830 – fl. 1904) was a long-serving civic official in the town of Brighton, in England.

Tillstone was an officer of Brighton Borough Council (now Brighton and Hove City Council) for 49 years from 1855 to 1904, serving from 1881 to 1904 as town clerk (the chief officer of the council).

A plaque in his memory is situated outside the Council Chamber in Brighton Town Hall, and Tillstone Street near Queen's Park is named in his honour.
