= Minisystem =

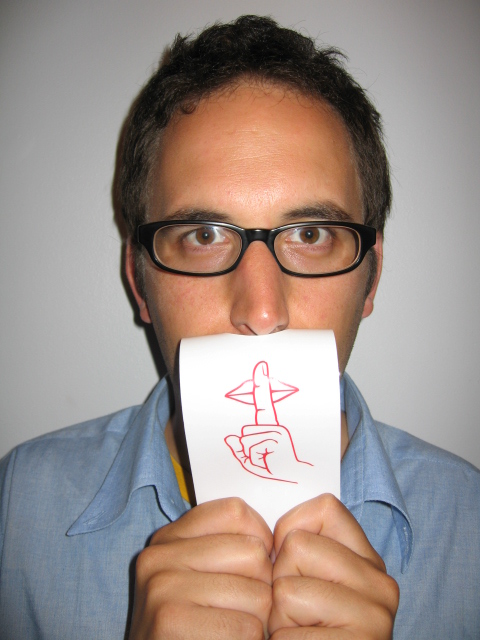

Background information
- Born: Jeffrey Lee
- Origin: Toronto, Ontario, Canada
- Genres: Electronic; synthpop
- Occupations: Musician, molecular biologist
- Years active: 2006–present
- Label: Noise Factory
- Website: www.minisystem.ca

Minisystem (Jeffrey Lee) is a Canadian solo electronic musician and molecular biologist based in Toronto, Ontario. His music is produced almost entirely with analog synthesizers and drum machines. His debut album, Madingley, was released in 2006 on Toronto's Noise Factory Records. Minisystem is often defined in contrast to Intelligent dance music and glitch. Combining simple drum sounds from the Roland TR-808 and TR-909 drum machines arranged in a dance progression with melodic and warm tones from a variety of vintage analog synthesizers, Minisystem has been compared to Tangerine Dream and Kraftwerk. His music has been described as "synth-pop".

== Biography ==
Lee was raised on his family's farm near Guelph, Ontario. Lee cites his early experiences in this rural setting as inspiration for his music. His first album gets its title from the name of the family farm. Lee went on to earn a BSc from the University of Waterloo and later moved to England to pursue his PhD at the University of Cambridge. Lee returned to Canada in 2002, this time settling in Toronto where he is currently a post-doctoral fellow at the University of Toronto. Since he began producing music, Lee has performed in Toronto as part of the Bit_Rock Alumnae, Math Hooker and Vague Terrain series of events.

== Musical influences ==
Lee's early musical influences include The Smiths, Depeche Mode, A Flock of Seagulls, and The Monks. While in Waterloo he was first exposed to experimental electronic artists such as Autechre and Aphex Twin. While in Cambridge, Lee took an active role in the budding electronic music scene by putting on shows at which he would sometimes DJ. Aspiring to create similarly experimental music during this time, Lee purchased a digital synthesizer and digital sampler, which he reportedly hated and soon after sold. Lee's next purchase was a Roland Juno-106 synthesizer, which unlike his earlier purchases would become a mainstay of his studio environment.

== Discography ==
- Madingley - 2006, Noise Factory Records
