= Charles Clover-Brown =

English cricketer

Personal information
- Born: 18 September 1907; Brentford, Middlesex, England
- Died: 6 October 1982 (aged 75); Hove, Sussex, England
- Batting: Right-handed
- Bowling: Leg break

Domestic team information
- Years: Team
- 1926–1933: Buckinghamshire

Career statistics
Competition	First-class
Matches	2
Runs scored	144
Batting average	48.00
100s/50s	1/0
Top score	100*
Catches/stumpings	0/–
- Source: Cricinfo, 25 May 2011

Charles Clover-Brown (18 September 1907 – 6 October 1982) was an English cricketer.

Clover-Brown was a right-handed batsman who bowled leg break. He was born in Brentford, Middlesex, and educated at Harrow School, where he captained the school cricket team. He made his debut for Buckinghamshire in the 1926 Minor Counties Championship against Hertfordshire, and played for Buckinghamshire from 1926 to 1933, including 10 Minor Counties Championship matches.

Clover-Brown made his first-class debut for Dr J Rockwood's Europeans XI against Maharaj Kumar of Vizianagram's XI in Colombo in December 1930. He scored 27 in the first innings and 1 in the second. He played his second first-class match five years later, playing for Ceylon against the Indian University Occasionals. He opened the batting and carried his bat, scoring 100* in the Ceylon first innings of 204.

He served as President of Old Harrovians F.C. from 1964 to 1982. He died in Hove, Sussex, on 6 October 1982.
