= EPs 1991–2002 =

Box set by Autechre
- Released: 15 February 2011 (Digital); 11 April 2011 (CD)
- Recorded: 1991–2002
- Genre: IDM
- Length: 5:40:08
- Label: Warp
- Producer: Autechre

Autechre chronology
| Move of Ten (2010) | EPs 1991–2002 (2011) | Exai (2013) |

EPs 1991–2002 is a 5-CD box set which contains material from all 11 EPs released by British electronic music duo Autechre between 1991 and 2002 including Autechre's first EP, Cavity Job, presented for the first time on CD. The "Basscadet" remixes made by Beaumont Hannant and Seefeel are not included.

The box is made of rigid black cardboard and each CD is housed in individual gatefold cardboard slipcase. The credit to Autechre and the titles are incised into the slipcase and the individual gatefold sleeves for the CD's.

== Critical reception ==
Professional ratings
Review scores
| Source | Rating |
|---|---|
| Allmusic | 4/5 stars |
| Pitchfork | (8.0/10) |
| Pop Matters | 8/10 stars |
| The 405 | 9.5/10 stars |

In his review, Jess Harvell (Pitchfork) called the collection "one of the better introductions to the duo's work" even though it contains a combination of "accessible" and "difficult" music. Corey Beasley (PopMatters) concurs, stating "the box could serve almost as well as an entry-point into the group’s catalog for a beginner as it would for a completionist or superfan". Gregory Heaney (Allmusic) noted the "stark, minimal, and austere" properties of the physical box set as one of its key selling points.

== Track listing ==
All music is composed by Rob Brown and Sean Booth.

Disc 1
| No. | Title | EP | Length |
|---|---|---|---|
| 1. | "Cavity Job" (first time on CD) | Cavity Job | 6:10 |
| 2. | "Accelera 1 & 2" (first time on CD) | Cavity Job | 6:39 |
| 3. | "Basscadet Bcdtmx" | Basscad EP | 6:48 |
| 4. | "Basscadet Basscadoublemx" (first time on CD) | Basscad EP | 4:26 |
| 5. | "Basscadet Tazmx" | Basscad EP | 6:53 |
| 6. | "Basscadet Basscadubmx" | Basscad EP | 9:37 |
| 7. | "Lost" | Anti EP | 7:24 |
| 8. | "Djarum" | Anti EP | 7:19 |
| 9. | "Flutter" | Anti EP | 9:59 |

Disc 2
| No. | Title | EP | Length |
|---|---|---|---|
| 1. | "Garbagemx" | Garbage | 14:11 |
| 2. | "PIOBmx" | Garbage | 7:37 |
| 3. | "Bronchusevenmx" | Garbage | 9:44 |
| 4. | "VLetrmx" | Garbage | 8:27 |
| 5. | "Second Bad Vilbel" | Anvil Vapre | 9:46 |
| 6. | "Second Scepe" | Anvil Vapre | 7:45 |
| 7. | "Second Scout" | Anvil Vapre | 7:22 |
| 8. | "Second Peng" | Anvil Vapre | 10:55 |

Disc 3
| No. | Title | EP | Length |
|---|---|---|---|
| 1. | "Milk DX" | Peel Session | 6:05 |
| 2. | "Inhake 2" | Peel Session | 8:36 |
| 3. | "Drane" | Peel Session | 10:49 |
| 4. | "Goz Quarter" | Envane | 9:42 |
| 5. | "Latent Quarter" | Envane | 7:37 |
| 6. | "Laughing Quarter" | Envane | 7:05 |
| 7. | "Draun Quarter" | Envane | 10:52 |

Disc 4
| No. | Title | EP | Length |
|---|---|---|---|
| 0. | "Untitled" (hidden track) | EP7 | 9:58 |
| 1. | "Yeesland" | Cichlisuite | 6:22 |
| 2. | "Pencha" | Cichlisuite | 6:13 |
| 3. | "Characi" | Cichlisuite | 7:23 |
| 4. | "Krib" | Cichlisuite | 3:11 |
| 5. | "Tilapia" | Cichlisuite | 6:14 |
| 6. | "Rpeg" | EP7 | 6:00 |
| 7. | "Ccec" | EP7 | 4:58 |
| 8. | "Squeller" | EP7 | 4:37 |
| 9. | "Left Blank" | EP7 | 6:40 |
| 10. | "Outpt" | EP7 | 7:12 |
| 11. | "Dropp" | EP7 | 3:16 |
| 12. | "Liccflii" | EP7 | 4:59 |

Disc 5
| No. | Title | EP | Length |
|---|---|---|---|
| 1. | "Maphive 6.1" | EP7 | 8:19 |
| 2. | "Zeiss Contarex" | EP7 | 6:33 |
| 3. | "Netlon Sentinel" | EP7 | 4:06 |
| 4. | "Pir" | EP7 | 3:32 |
| 5. | "Gelk" | Peel Session 2 | 8:50 |
| 6. | "Blifil" | Peel Session 2 | 7:00 |
| 7. | "Gaekwad" | Peel Session 2 | 6:25 |
| 8. | "19 Headaches" | Peel Session 2 | 7:14 |
| 9. | "Gantz Graf" | Gantz Graf | 3:57 |
| 10. | "Dial." | Gantz Graf | 6:17 |
| 11. | "Cap.IV" | Gantz Graf | 9:04 |
