= Exai =

Studio album by Autechre
- Released: 7 February 2013
- Genres: Electronic; IDM; experimental; abstract; ambient
- Length: 120:32 (Standard); 129:29 (Japanese Edition)
- Label: Warp
- Producers: Rob Brown; Sean Booth

Autechre chronology
| EPs 1991–2002 (2011) | Exai (2013) | L-event (2013) |

Exai is the eleventh studio album by British electronic music duo Autechre. It was released on 7 February 2013 through Warp Records, with physical versions arriving on 5 March 2013. Prior to the release of NTS Sessions 1–4, Exai was Autechre's longest album.

Sean Booth and Rob Brown experimented with something they call "the system", a large network of software and synthesisers, during the creation of Exai. Critics responded generally positively to the album, noting its complexity and its use of sounds from previous albums. Some criticised the selection of tracks on the album and their length. Exai was followed by a companion EP named L-event which released on 28 October 2013.

== Background ==
Brown and Booth, the duo that make up Autechre, released their first song, Cavity Job, in 1991. Their first album, Incunabula, was released in 1993 and became a surprise success. Throughout their discography, the duo gradually moved into less melodic and more experimental and glitchy music, notably with such releases as Confield, Untilted and Quaristice. Critics have described their newer sound as cold, distant and complex.

== Recording ==
Brown and Booth have stated that they primarily compose their newer music utilising "the system"—a large network of synthesisers, software and other digital processes built primarily in Max. The duo have said in later interviews that the process is not entirely generative. Instead, human input is still required to make changes and "guide" the system during track creation.

For Exai, the duo decided to move away from MIDI, which was used during the recording of Quaristice, stating that it "wasn't quite what [they] wanted to be doing". Exai and its tracks were a product of trial runs with the new system, subsequently processed and edited into completed tracks. In an interview with Resident Advisor, Booth stated that Exai was discussed as a potential project at least a year before its release. According to Booth, most of the tracks were two or three years old when the album came out.

== Composition ==
Exai has been described as electronic, experimental, IDM, abstract and ambient. Exai is spread across 17 tracks, making it a double album. Compared to Oversteps, one critic noted Exai was a lot more complex and "intelligent". Andy Kellman of AllMusic commented that many of the tracks on Exai were thrilling, and noted their accessibility. Kellman discussed tracks such as "recks on", calling it crisp, industrial and a hybrid of beats and bass; he also said that it was one of the heaviest tracks Autechre had produced. Reviewing Exai for BBC Music, Chris Power called the track "Flep" a unique breakbeat-powered track. The longest track on the album, "bladelores", is an echoing atmospheric track that contains a "wave of pads" surging throughout.

"T ess xi"
The fifth track on Exai. "T ess xi" features a synthesiser-based melody and crunching drums

In a review for The Quietus, Charlie Frame called the ten-minute track "irlite (get 0)" a battle between a sub-bass and a variety of random synth stabs. Frame also discussed "bladelores", calling it a highlight of the album. The track is made up of gradually slowing beats, trance-like chords and "gritty little acid squiggles", after which it becomes more ambient before it gets "[pulled] back under" and put "back into the boggy marsh". Frame also compared the track to "Cichli" and "Garbagemx36", two previous Autechre songs, in terms of its structure. Discussing Exai for Pitchfork, Grayson Haver Currin stated that the track "T ess xi" made use of "fluorescent soul keyboards" as a basic building block in its composition. Currin also discussed "deco Loc", describing how the duo used cut-up vocal samples and other repurposed sound which created appealing soundscapes and atmospheres.

Lee Wang of Slant called the album's closer "YJY UX" a moody and empty ambient track featuring "groaning" basslines. Wang also noted "T ess xi", a track reminiscent of Chiastic Slide. Andrew Ryce of Resident Advisor compared the melody of "jatevee C" to Incunabula, and characterised the rhythm of the track "tuinorizn" as stuttering dubstep. Josh Becker of Beats per Minute called the song "cloudline" a "malformed ode to trip-hop". Becker also compared "Fleure" to "Pulk/Pull Revolving Doors" by Radiohead, both exemplifying the genre of glitch music.

== Release ==
Exai was announced on 13 December 2012, originally planned for release on 5 March 2013. The album was released unexpectedly early though digital platforms on 7 February 2013. Exai was officially released on 2xCD by Beat Records in Japan on 27 February 2013, and on 4xLP and 2xCD by Warp on 5 March 2013.

Autechre typically release companion projects to accompany their albums; this includes Cichlisuite for Chiastic Slide, EP7 for LP5 and Move of Ten for Oversteps. A companion EP to Exai, titled L-event, was announced on 16 September 2013, releasing on 11 October 2013 on digital platforms and on 28 October 2013 on both CD and LP.

== Reception ==
Professional ratings
Aggregate scores
| Source | Rating |
|---|---|
| AnyDecentMusic? | 7.9/10 |
| Metacritic | 80/100 |
Review scores
| Source | Rating |
| AllMusic | 4/5 stars |
| Clash | 8/10 |
| Exclaim! | 7/10 |
| Mixmag | 4/5 stars |
| Pitchfork | 5.9/10 |
| PopMatters | 9/10 |
| Record Collector | 4/5 stars |
| Resident Advisor | 3.5/5 |
| The Skinny | 5/5 stars |
| Slant Magazine | 4/5 stars |

Exai was received positively by critics. At Metacritic, which aggregates scores from mainstream critics, Exai has an average score of 80 based on 26 reviews, indicating a score of "generally favorable".

Matthew Bennett of Clash gave Exai an 8/10, lauding the mixture of Autechre's older hip-hop sound with their newer programming. Lee Wang of Slant gave the album 4/5, writing that the album represented a "career-spanning work" that drew inspiration and ideas from throughout their discography. Brandon Bussolini of XLR8R wrote that the album "more consistently evokes the club" than other projects the duo had previously released. For Exclaim!, Nick Storring stated that Exai was not cutting edge, but still full of detail and intensity. Thomas Hannan of The Line of Best Fit said the album could "really do with being broken up in to as many chunks as possible", but recommended people to listen to it, saying "there's always room in one's collection for records as smart as this".

Andrew Ryce of Resident Advisor compared the tracks on Exai to data overload, more prominent than on their previous projects. Concluding his review, Ryce felt the duo were more confident in their sound, but showed its real cohesion only in its "resistance to linearity and conventional melody". Tom Fenwick of PopMatters stated how Exai didn't mark a major shift in the duo's sound, but instead expanded on it and offered "unfathomable depths" for dedicated listeners. In a review for The Quietus, Charlie Frame commented that Exai drew ideas from entire Autechre's discography, while sound-wise remaining very similar to the projects such as Oversteps and Move of Ten. In the Calgary Herald review, Francois Marchand gave the album 4/5 stars; while Marchand noted the relatively unapproachable nature of Exai for new listeners, he highlighted it as one of the duo's most accessible albums.

Both Grayson Haver Currin (Pitchfork) and Andy Kellman (AllMusic) criticised Exai's tracklist, noting some songs should be shortened or cut out entirely. Mixmag's Joe Muggs wrote that understanding the album wasn't easy, but nevertheless rewarding to the listener. Josh Becker of Beats per Minute gave a positive review, praising the album's ability to "impl[y] melody" rather than displaying it outright. Writing for The Irish Times, Jim Carroll gave the album three stars, praising Exai for being as intense as other releases from the duo and their openness to take risks. Mark Shukla of The Skinny called Exai a "thrilling renewal that leaves them perfectly poised for whatever leap they may choose to make next". For BBC Music, Chris Power called the album "often abrasive and fidgety" and said it was easy to see it as the "first chapter of late-period Autechre" due to the duo revisiting past sounds with new focus.

== Track listing ==
All tracks are written by Sean Booth and Rob Brown.

Exai track listing
| No. | Title | Length |
|---|---|---|
| 1. | "FLeure" | 4:51 |
| 2. | "irlite (get 0)" | 10:01 |
| 3. | "prac-f" | 4:20 |
| 4. | "jatevee C" | 4:14 |
| 5. | "T ess xi" | 6:43 |
| 6. | "vekoS" | 6:42 |
| 7. | "Flep" | 6:43 |
| 8. | "tuinorizn" | 3:40 |
| 9. | "bladelores" | 12:20 |
| 10. | "1 1 is" | 7:18 |
| 11. | "nodezsh" | 8:40 |
| 12. | "runrepik" | 4:35 |
| 13. | "spl9" | 7:06 |
| 14. | "cloudline" | 10:13 |
| 15. | "deco Loc" | 5:27 |
| 16. | "recks on" | 9:22 |
| 17. | "YJY UX" | 8:24 |
| Total length: | | 120:32 |

Japanese bonus track
| No. | Title | Length |
|---|---|---|
| 18. | "18 (keyosc)" | 8:57 |
| Total length: | | 129:29 |

== Charts ==
Chart performance for Exai
| Chart (2013) | Peak position |
|---|---|
| UK Albums (Official Charts) | 88 |
| Scottish Albums (Official Charts) | 100 |
| UK Dance Albums (Official Charts) | 39 |
| UK Independent Albums (Official Charts) | 15 |
| Belgian Albums (Ultratop Flanders) | 84 |
| Belgian Albums (Ultratop Wallonia) | 110 |
| US Top Dance Albums (Billboard) | 21 |

== Release history ==
| Country/Region | Date | Label | Format | Catalogue number |
|---|---|---|---|---|
| Japan | 27 February 2013 | Beat Records | 2×CD | BRC-365LTD |
| Europe | 5 March 2013 | Warp Records | 2×CD | WARPCD234 |
| Europe | 5 March 2013 | Warp Records | 4×LP | WARPLP234 |
