= Sign (Autechre album) =

Studio album by Autechre
- Released: 16 October 2020
- Recorded: 2018 – 2020
- Genres: IDM; experimental; electronic; abstract
- Length: 65:33 (Standard); 71:47 (Japanese Edition)
- Label: Warp
- Producers: Rob Brown; Sean Booth

Autechre chronology
AE_LIVE 2016/2018 (2020)	Sign (2020)	Plus (2020)

Sign (often stylized as SIGN) is the fourteenth studio album by British electronic music duo Autechre. It was announced on 2 September 2020 and was released on 16 October 2020 through Warp Records on 2×LP, CD and digital services. Sign was recorded between 2018 and 2019, with production finishing in February 2020. The artwork for the release was created by The Designers Republic. The title of Sign is an acronym; however, the duo have never explained its meaning.

Critics responded positively to the album, noting the album's more accessible direction compared to the duo's previous works. Plus, a companion album to Sign, was released without announcement twelve days later. As of May 2026, Sign and Plus have been the duo's last studio albums in 5 years.

== Background ==
Autechre are a British electronic music duo consisting of Rob Brown and Sean Booth. The duo released their first record, Cavity Job, in 1991. Their first album, Incunabula, was released in 1993 and became a surprise success. The duo gradually moved into less melodic and more experimental music, notably with the release of albums like Confield, Quaristice, and Exai. The duo also moved away from composing music with traditional synthesisers, opting for programs and generative algorithms such as Max. Critics have described their newer sound as cold, distant and complex.

== Recording ==
Autechre recorded the tracks that ended up on Sign between 2018 and 2019, finishing production in February 2020. Booth described how he would write pieces of software, send them to Brown and receive "weird tracks" in return.

Brown and Booth have stated in interviews their newer music is primarily composed with something named "the system"; it has been described as a large network of synthesisers and digital processes built in Max. While Autechre make use of Max, and more specifically "the system", Booth stated the music wasn't entirely generative; it instead requires human input to change and guide tracks.

Brown stated in an interview that the album's title was an acronym, but that they "don't want to tell anybody what it stands for." Booth stated that much of the album's creation was "all over the place" and that the duo usually work better with "as little direction as possible". Booth also stated that the duo did not share tracks with each other for almost a year.

== Composition ==
"Esc Desc"
The fourth track on the album. "Esc Desc" features a variety of layered synths throughout.

Sign has been described as experimental, IDM, and electronic. Critics wrote that the composition of Sign was a lot more accessible in comparison to the duo's previous projects such as NTS Sessions 1–4 and elseq 1–5. Philip Sherburne of Pitchfork commented that the track "Esc Desc" was "slow and stately" and that the track contained "layered synths slipping between consonance and dissonance". Sherburne also stated that tracks such as "Psin AM" contained "sullen synths" that call back to Boards of Canada's Hi Scores EP. He also pointed out "Metaz form8", calling it an "ambient centerpiece" of the album. In a review for AllMusic, Paul Simpson called "F7" a track with light beats that resembled "smeared, melted neon". "Si00" is a track that Simpson called an "enchanting sequence of bubbles" that gradually emerge from the unsteady beat. Simpson said that "Au14" was a sharper track, containing sharp pulses and a "swirl of particles". Andrew Ryce's review of Sign for Resident Advisor called "F7" one of Autechre's most "gorgeous" tracks, and that it was similar in composition to "known(1)" from Oversteps. "Esc Desc" was also noted for its "silvery synths".

Daryl Keating of Exclaim! wrote that Sign featured a more "stripped back" structure, more so than their previous projects. Keating also commented that the duo "largely jettisoned the beats on Sign," but noted that they "haven't gone fully ambient either". Writing for The Guardian, Tayyab Amin wrote that the melodies on Sign took prominence during the album, and that it was a "dense and viscous record with synthetic textures that hold great depth". Ollie Rankine of Loud and Quiet also noted Sign's more melodic approach, commenting that the duo had "[attached] a rare melodic depth to their expansive sound". Charlie Frame, writing for The Quietus commented that "Gr4" was "perhaps the prettiest track" and that it "showcases see-sawing synths that keen like a string quartet". He wrote that "Si007" featured a dry kick that "always seems a micro-step ahead of itself, like feet tripping over themselves".

== Release ==
In early 2020, Sign and its companion album Plus were teased through a series of live mix sessions. The album's release date and cover art were announced on 2 September 2020.

Sign was officially released on 16 October 2020 through Warp Records on CD, 2×LP, and digital services. The artwork for the release was created by The Designers Republic, who have handled artwork for previous Autechre albums such as Oversteps or NTS Sessions 1–4. The release of Sign marked the duo's first standard length album since the release of Exai. A companion album to Sign, titled Plus (stylised as PLUS) was released without announcement twelve days after the release of Sign.

In a 2024 interview with the duo for Metal, Booth and Brown showed their disinterest in future studio albums. Booth noted how the concept of a studio album seemed "outdated", while Brown noted the difficulties in album promotion. The duo highlighted their preference towards live recordings, noting AE_2022– as an example.

== Critical reception ==
Professional ratings
Aggregate scores
Source	Rating
Metacritic	82/100
Review scores
Source	Rating
AllMusic	3.5/5 stars
Clash	9/10
Exclaim!	8/10
The Guardian	3/5 stars
Mojo	4/5 stars
Pitchfork	8.1/10
Record Collector	3/5 stars
Uncut	8/10
Under the Radar	7/10
Beats Per Minute	79%

Sign was received positively by critics. At Metacritic, which aggregates scores from mainstream critics, Sign has an average score of 82 based on 12 reviews, indicating "critical acclaim".

Reviewing Sign for AllMusic, Paul Simpson commented that some tracks lacked form and were not unique and distinctive enough to be memorable for listeners. However, he also concluded that Sign was a more approachable Autechre release and a good starting point for new listeners. Nick Roseblade of Clash gave a positive review, noting the album's more melodic nature compared to past projects by the duo. Daryl Keating of Exclaim! noted the quality of the music seen throughout the album, and commented on its accessibility towards newer listeners. Writing for The Quietus, Charlie Frame called the album a "welcome detour" and felt it proved Autechre were "in tune with their audience". The Quietus also ranked Sign at number 13 on their list of albums of the year in 2020; Frame stated it was a "emotionally direct" album.

In a review for The Guardian, Tayyab Amin said that the album failed to stand out in the modern day music scene. However, he also wrote about how there were times when Sign "truly soars". Philip Sherburne of Pitchfork concluded that "Autechre have managed to do something that machines can't do nearly as well as humans: surprise us." Joey Arnone of Under the Radar commented on the duo's ability to create confusing atmospheres and soundscapes, and said that the tracks on Sign were "chaotic and ethereal, harsh and euphoric, mechanical and biological" all at the same time. In a piece for Beats Per Minute, Jeremy Fisette described how the compositions seen throughout the album were as experimental and difficult as previous albums from the duo. He also stated how Autechre "continue to beguile and confound" and called Sign the duo's "most flat-out gorgeous album in ages". Mike Goldsmith of Record Collector gave Sign three stars and discussed how the album took a more ambient and melodic approach compared to their previous albums. Goldsmith also noted how the album showed a less technical side of Autechre.

== Track listing ==
All tracks are written by Sean Booth and Rob Brown.

Sign track listing (Note: The official album tracklisting names the songs as "M4 Lema", "F7", "si00", "esc desc", "au14", "Metaz form8", "sch.mefd 2", "gr4", "th red a", "psin AM", and "r cazt".)
No.	Title	Length
1.	"M4 Lema"	8:49
2.	"F7"	5:56
3.	"Si00"	5:51
4.	"Esc Desc"	4:55
5.	"Au14"	5:03
6.	"Metaz form8"	6:00
7.	"Sch.Mefd 2"	5:25
8.	"Gr4"	3:21
9.	"Th Red A"	6:35
10.	"Psin AM"	6:20
11.	"R Cazt"	7:12
Total length:		65:33

Japanese bonus track
No.	Title	Length
12.	"N Cur (Note: The official album tracklisting names the song as "n Cur".)"	6:14
Total length:		71:47

== Charts ==
Chart performance for Sign
Chart (2020)	Peak position
Belgian Albums (Ultratop Flanders)	10
Belgian Albums (Ultratop Wallonia)	56
Dutch Albums (Album Top 100)	51
German Albums (Offizielle Top 100)	53
Scottish Albums (Official Charts)	16
UK Albums (Official Charts)	41
