= Andy Maddocks =

Musician and founder of Skam records

Andy Maddocks is an English entrepreneur and musician. He was instrumental in the foundation of Skam Records, a Manchester-based independent electronic label, in the early 1990s. He is also a member of the collaborative, electronic music project Gescom together with Darrell Fitton, Russell Haswell, and Rob Hall.

== Skam records ==
Maddocks founded Skam records (naming it as an acronym for Some Knowledge About Music) in 1990 or 1991, though the label did not become especially active until 1994. Skam's first twelve-inch single was a self-titled debut from Lego Feet (a predecessor to British electronic music duo Autechre). The label followed with two 12" EP records from Gescom. Skam entered the full-length album market in 1998 with the releases of Soup by Bola, a stage name used by Darrell Fitton and the album Music Has the Right to Children by Boards of Canada, the latter being jointly released with Warp Records.

As a solo act, Maddocks performed live on the second day of the first Coachella music festival in October 1999. Other artists affiliated with Skam records also performed that day, including Autechre, Jega and Push Button Objects.
