= Gescom =

British electronic music project

- Genres: Electronic music IDM abstract hip hop
- Years active: 1994–present
- Label: Skam Records
- Members: Sean Booth; Rob Brown
- Past members: Andy Maddocks; Darrell Fitton; Mike Williamson; Rob Hall; Russell Haswell

Gescom is an electronic music project based in the UK with close ties to the electronic duo Autechre.

Stylistically, the music of Gescom is closer to electronic dance music, acid techno, and industrial music than Autechre's, with the exception of a few conceptual remixes (and Minidisc, see below). Notable releases include Key Nell, Minidisc, and ISS:SA.

== Members ==
Sean Booth of Autechre describes Gescom as an umbrella project involving 20 or 30 people. However, since most of their releases are anonymous, the exact roster of the project is not widely known.

- Autechre's debut album, Incunabula, has the motto "Gescom 'pleasure is our business'" printed on the spine of the packaging, and thanks to "Darrell Fitton 4 Gescom" in the liner notes.
- Autechre's remix EP Basscad has the motto "Gescom 'pleasure is our business'" printed on the inside spine of the CD, and "Autechre Music Systems from Gescom Transcendental" in the liner notes.
- The Gescom EP credits "conspirators" as Sean Booth and Rob Brown (Autechre), Darrell Fitton (alias Bola), Rob Hall (from Skam Records), and Daniel 72 (a musician and designer near Manchester).
- The Gescom 2 EP credits its "conspirators" as Sean Booth and Rob Brown (Autechre), and Andy Maddocks (from Skam Records).
- The Key Nell EP says, "Conceived & secreted by Gescom."
- The Keynell remixes EP says, "Conceived & secreted by Gescom. Additional nurturing & care from Autechre."
- The This EP credits remixes to "Ae" (Autechre), and Velocity Kendall.
- The That EP credits remixes to Tara, Pharoid with Time Chamber, Gescom, and DC Duo's.

== Discography ==
- (1994) Gescom E.P. (sometimes Gescom EP1 or Gescom 1)
- (1994) Gescom 2 (sometimes Gescom EP2 or C & D)
- (1995) The Sounds of Machines Our Parents Used
- (1995) Key Nell
- (1996) Motor
- (1996) Keynell (Autechre remixes)
- (1998) This
- (1998) That
- (1998) Minidisc (sometimes Mini Disc) (album released on MD, later on CD)
- (2003) ISS:SA
- (2007) A1-D1 (released as two 12" EPs and one CD album)
- (2011) Skull Snap

All are EPs, except for Minidisc and A1-D1.
