= Joyride (Lida Husik album) =

Studio album by Lida Husik
- Released: March 14, 1995
- Studios: T.T.B., Wakefield, England; Zabriske Point, New York City, NY; WGNS, Washington D.C.
- Genre: Alternative rock
- Length: 48:12
- Label: Caroline
- Producers: Beaumont Hannant, Kurt Ralske, Geoff Turner

Lida Husik chronology
Evening at the Grange (1994)	Joyride (1995)	Green Blue Fire (1996)

Joyride is the fourth album by the singer-songwriter Lida Husik, released in 1995 through Caroline Records.

== Production ==
The album was partly recorded at WGNS Studio, in Washington, D.C.

== Critical reception ==
Professional ratings
Review scores
Source	Rating
AllMusic	4/5 stars
The Encyclopedia of Popular Music	3/5 stars
MusicHound Rock: The Essential Album Guide	4.5/5 stars

MusicHound Rock: The Essential Album Guide called the album "one of the lost mini-masterpieces of the '90s." Trouser Press wrote that "between the intricate vocal arrangements, the endless attractive music and Husik’s inventive playing, Joyride is the pinnacle of her pop art." The Washington Post called the album "wispily psychedelic," writing that "there's little tension in its evocation of altered-state bliss." Billboard wrote that "Husik's soft, sensual alto ... rises above the current bumper crop of girly voices." CMJ New Music Monthly called it "a remarkably fluid song-cycle of sublety."

== Track listing ==
All tracks are written by Lida Husik, except "Strawberries Are Growing in My Garden (And It's Wintertime)," by the Dentists.

No.	Title	Length
1.	"Joyride"	2:38
2.	"Mother Richard"	3:36
3.	"Glorious"	4:47
4.	"Flower of the Hour"	4:15
5.	"Midnight of Life"	2:28
6.	"Strawberries Are Growing in My Garden (And It's Wintertime)"	4:51
7.	"Star"	5:23
8.	"Persinthia Lawdro and John"	4:20
9.	"Sweet Lavender"	3:58
10.	"Donkey Pot"	3:46
11.	"Mickey Minnie"	3:59
12.	"Dreamlake"	4:11

== Personnel ==
Musicians

- Sven Abow – drums on "Glorious"
- John Giesecke – drums
- Lida Husik – vocals, guitar, bass guitar, organ, illustrations
- Julius Klepacz – drums on "Strawberries Are Growing in My Garden" and "Persinthia Lawdro & John"
- Mick Murphy – additional vocals on "Strawberries Are Growing in My Garden"
- Jay Spiegel – drums on "Mother Richard, "Midnight of Life" and "Micky Minnie"
- Charles Steck – bass guitar

Production and additional personnel

- Jim De Barros – design
- Richard Brown – production
- John Falls – photography, design
- Beaumont Hannant – production
- Kurt Ralske – production
- Geoff Turner – production
