= Ormeau =

Ormeau may refer to:

- Ormeau, Queensland, a town on the Gold Coast hinterland in Queensland, Australia
- Belfast Ormeau, UK parliament constituency, 1918–1922
- Ormeau Road, a major road in Belfast, and the area around it
- "Ormeau", a song by Beaumont Hannant
