= Minidisk =

Minidisk, Mini Disk, MiniDisc, Mini Disc or similar may refer to:

- MiniDisc, a magneto-optical disc-based music and data storage format developed by Sony
- Minidisk (CMS), a minidisk formatted for use by the CMS operating system under CP-67 or VM
- Minidisk (floppy), 5.25-inch floppy diskette type
- Minidisk (VM), a virtual disk provided by the CP-67 or VM operating system
- Mini-Disk, a consumer mechanical digital audio disc from Telefunken
- Olivetti Minidisk, a 2.5-inch sleeveless floppy diskette format by Olivetti for their P6040 (1975)
- Minidisc (album), a Gescom album
- MiniDiscs [Hacked], a music compilation by Radiohead

== See also ==
- Mini CD, a smaller variant of the standard full-size Compact Disc
- MiniDVD, a smaller variant of the standard full-size DVD format
- MiniDVD (disambiguation), formats similar to the MiniDVD
- Micro disk
- MD (disambiguation)
