= Faith in Space =

Studio album by Lida Husik
- Released: September 22, 1998
- Studios: The Cathouse & Silverlake, Los Angeles, California
- Genre: Alternative rock
- Length: 49:56
- Label: Alias
- Producer: Beaumont Hannant

Lida Husik chronology
| Fly Stereophonic (1997) | Faith in Space (1998) | Mad Flavor (1999) |

Faith in Space is an album by the singer-songwriter Lida Husik. It was released in 1998 through Alias Records.

== Critical reception ==
Professional ratings
Review scores
| Source | Rating |
|---|---|
| AllMusic | 4/5 stars |
| Pitchfork | 8.6/10 |

Wired wrote that the album's "cabaret dance pop marks the same territory as Madonna's Ray of Light, but with a less chilly approach and none of the self-righteous armchair spirituality." The Washington Post called the album "a little spacey", writing that "its mixture of beats and burbles sounds less like a trip to another galaxy than like a walk in the woods near a rave."

== Track listing ==
All tracks are written by Lida Husik, except "Monday," by Paul Weller.

| No. | Title | Length |
|---|---|---|
| 1. | "Build a Fire" | 4:37 |
| 2. | "Dissolve" | 4:59 |
| 3. | "Angels on the Floor" | 5:49 |
| 4. | "Bodies a Model" | 4:34 |
| 5. | "Waterfall" | 5:10 |
| 6. | "The Planet's On" | 5:09 |
| 7. | "New Miss NYC" | 4:51 |
| 8. | "Ice It" | 6:09 |
| 9. | "Blood and Water" | 5:14 |
| 10. | "Monday" | 3:22 |

== Personnel ==
- Beaumont Hannant – drum machine, keyboards, sampler
- Lida Husik – vocals, guitar, bass guitar, keyboards
- Mandy Parnell – mastering
