= The Positiva Ambient Collection =

Compilation album by various artists
- Released: 19 July 1993
- Recorded: 1990–1993
- Genre: Ambient; ambient techno; ambient house
- Length: 73:32
- Label: Positiva Records
- Producer: Various

The Positiva Ambient Collection is a compilation album of various artists released by British dance music label Positiva Records in 1993, documenting ambient house and ambient techno music, both of which were popular underground electronic genres in the United Kingdom at the time. The compilation, the first album released on the label, features an exclusive live recording of The Orb and is said to prove ambient house's variety and worldwide emergence. Upon its release, The Positiva Ambient Collection received critical acclaim, and has continued to receive acclaim in the ensuing years. It has also been credited for bringing Beaumont Hannant to prominence via the inclusion of his track "Awakening the Soul".

== Background ==
Dance music label Positiva Records was founded in 1993 by Nick Halkes during the popularity of ambient house and ambient techno music in the United Kingdom; music critic Andrew Perry described ambient house as "perfect for home listening", ergo suitable for the album format, and as being total value for money "because the records are twice as long as everyone else's." Although the label had yet to release any albums by mid-1993, the label conceived The Positiva Ambient Collection as a means to reflect the emergence of both genres, and it became the first album on the label.

Unlike later compilations by the label, none of the music on The Positiva Ambient Collection is sourced from Positiva Records' catalogue itself, with the label having only recently started earlier in the year. As such, Halkes cross-licensed the music from WAU! Mr. Modo Recordings, Tomato Records, UpFront Records, General Production Recordings, Internal Recordings, Food Records, Rising High Records, Instinct Records, Warp and Transmat Records, most of which were electronic labels.

== Music ==
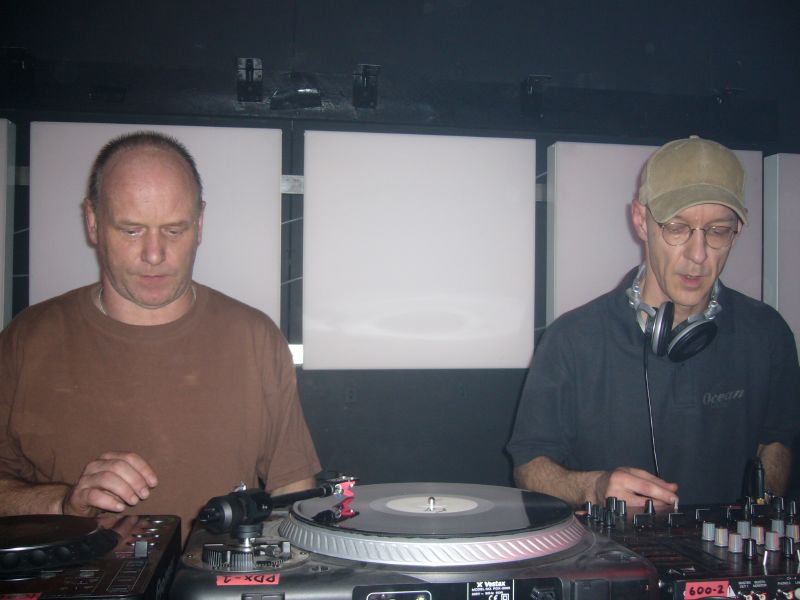
The Orb contribute an exclusive live version of "O.O.B.E.".

Josh Bush of AllMusic described The Positiva Ambient Collection's contents as ambient techno, whereas Andrew Perry, writing for Select magazine, described the album as an ambient house "sampler" that "[gives] you the pick in a sofa-friendly continuous-play context." Believing the compilation to prove that ambient house "encompasses much more than just pretty tunes with slow basslines and running through them," Perry noted the inclusion of "pleasant head-bobbers" such as "Digi-Out" by The Infinite Wheel and "Halcyon" by Orbital, "pure drifts of ambience" like "Sky High" by The Irresistible Force "Hub" by The Black Dog and the combining of the genre's "woshy sounds" with "heady percussion" on "O.O.B.E." by The Orb and Aphex Twin's "Reconstruction 2 Mix" of Jesus Jones' "Zeroes and Ones."

While many of the artists on the CD are those that launched the ambient house genre in the UK, several international artists appear, namely New York artist Moby with his track "Infinite", Detroit techno pioneer Derrick May with his Rhythm Is Rhythm song "Kao-tic Harmony (Relic of Relics)" and Berlin-based Visions of Shiva's "Perfect Morning", which prove, in Parry's words, that the genre is "a global thing." The Orb's live rendition of "O.O.B.E.", recorded at Aylesbury Civic Centre on 4 June 1992, is an "Exclusive Live Version" released in this version for the first time on the compilation, although it is an edited version of the version that initially appeared on the Volume Magazine compilation Volume Five.

== Release and reception ==
Professional ratings
Review scores
| Source | Rating |
|---|---|
| AllMusic | 4.5/5 stars |
| Select | 5/5 stars |

The Positiva Ambient Collection was released by Positiva Records on 19 July 1993 and was among the first releases on the label. In addition to its key release in the United Kingdom, it was also issued in Australia. Design agency The Unknown designed its album cover, and the album liner notes contain a joke excerpt from Andrew Weatherall's non-existent novel Sabres Rip Your Bunkers Off. In Billboard magazine, Dominic Pride described The Positiva Ambient Collection as "weighing in" on the compilations market which he described as "one area in which the majors and indies compete, and is a vital way of introducing new music to buyers."

The album was released to critical acclaim. Andrew Perry of Select magazine rated the album perfect score of five out of five and said the album proves that ambient house would continue to be popular. John Bush of AllMusic rated the album four and a half stars out of five and called the album "a nearly flawless collection of early-'90s ambient-techno." The album also helped establish the career of Beaumont Hannant, due to the inclusion of his song "Awakening the Soul"; in The Guinness Encyclopedia of Popular Music, writer Colin Larkin identified the album as where he "principally came to prominence." Nottingham based producer Ben Roberts (Xoundboy) noted that The Positiva Ambient Collection "lived permanently in my CD player for about a year."

Following the release of The Positiva Ambient Collection and under the inspiration of its success, Positiva Records would establish the Phase series of compilations in 1994 that featured exclusive mixes from the label, beginning with Positiva: Phase One (1994). Several of the artists who signed to Positiva between the release of Ambient Collection and Positiva: Phase One did so in reply to the message in the liner notes of The Positiva Ambient Collection, "We want to hear your tapes!", complete with contact information.

== Track listing ==
1. The Orb – "O.O.B.E." (Exclusive Live Version) – 8:04
2. The Infinite Wheel – "Digi Out" – 10:08
3. Visions of Shiva – "Perfect Morning" – 3:53
4. The Black Dog – "Hub" – 4:09
5. Orbital – "Halcyon" – 3:45
6. Jesus Jones vs. The Aphex Twin – "Zeroes and Ones" (Aphex Twin Reconstruction 2 Mix) – 5:45
7. The Irresistible Force – "Sky High" – 11:54
8. Moby – "Mobility" – 6:06
9. Beaumont Hannant – "Awakening the Soul" – 6:17
10. Polygon Window – "If It Really Is Me" – 7:02
11. Rhythim Is Rhythim – "Kao-tic Harmony (Relic Of Relics)" – 6:27

== Personnel ==
- The Agency – graphic design

== See also ==
- Positiva Records
