= Kroungrine =

Studio album by Bola
- Released: 18 June 2007
- Genre: Electronica
- Length: 53:36
- Label: Skam
- Producer: Bola

Bola chronology
Gnayse (2004)	Kroungrine (2007)	D.E.G. (2017)

Professional ratings
Review scores
Source	Rating
AllMusic	3.5/5 stars

Kroungrine is a studio album by English electronic music artist Bola. It was released in 2007 through Skam Records on both CD (SKALD022) and 2LP (SKALP022).

== Track listing ==
1. "Zoft Broiled Ed" - 5:03
2. "Noop" - 4:28
3. "Waknuts" - 5:32
4. "Halyloola" - 4:54
5. "Urenforpuren" - 6:08
6. "Phulcra" - 5:51
7. "Rainslaight" - 6:19
8. "Diamortem" - 15:21
