= Evening at the Grange =

EP by Lida Husik/Beaumont Hannant
- Released: November 8, 1994
- Recorded: T.T.B. Studios, Wakefield, England
- Genre: Psychedelic rock, alternative rock
- Length: 26:12
- Label: Astralwerks
- Producer: Richard Brown, Beaumont Hannant

Lida Husik chronology
The Return of Red Emma (1993)	Evening at the Grange (1994)	Joyride (1995)

Professional ratings
Review scores
Source	Rating
Allmusic	(unrated)

Evening at the Grange is an EP by Lida Husik and Beaumont Hannant, released on November 8, 1994, through Astralwerks.

== Track listing ==
No.	Title	Writer(s)	Length
1.	"Promenade"	Lida Husik	3:10
2.	"Textured"	Beaumont Hannant, Lida Husik	2:14
3.	"Now I'm Older, Silver Girl"	Beaumont Hannant, Lida Husik	3:17
4.	"Gregory Peck"	Lida Husik	3:19
5.	"Starburst 7"	Beaumont Hannant, Lida Husik	1:59

== Personnel ==
Musicians

- Beaumont Hannant – keyboards, production
- Lida Husik – vocals, guitar

Production and additional personnel

- Richard Brown – production, engineering
- Wendi Horowitz – design
- Tom Merwin – illustrations
- Norbert Vogel – design
