= The Return of Red Emma =

Studio album by Lida Husik
- Released: December 8, 1993
- Recorded: 1992
- Studio: Noise New York (Jersey City, NJ)
- Genre: Alternative rock
- Length: 40:13
- Label: Shimmy Disc
- Producer: Lida Husik, Ron Paul

Lida Husik chronology
| Your Bag (1992) | The Return of Red Emma (1993) | Evening at the Grange (1994) |

Professional ratings
Review scores
| Source | Rating |
|---|---|
| AllMusic | 3/5 stars |
| MusicHound Rock: The Essential Album Guide | 2.5/5 stars |

The Return of Red Emma is the third studio album by the singer-songwriter Lida Husik, released in 1993 by Shimmy Disc.

== Critical reception ==
Trouser Press wrote that "the swirling moods seem less to spring mysteriously from the songs themselves — as they do on Bozo — than to be draped over them. It sounds oddly unsettled and tired at the same time."

== Track listing ==
All tracks are written by Lida Husik, except "Bustop," by Tim Briffa.

| No. | Title | Length |
|---|---|---|
| 1. | "Back in the March" | 3:10 |
| 2. | "Highgate" | 2:14 |
| 3. | "AZT NO" | 3:17 |
| 4. | "Suicide Sedan" | 3:19 |
| 5. | "Earthquake Blues" | 1:59 |
| 6. | "Light of the Day" | 2:18 |
| 7. | "Hopi Ants" | 2:45 |
| 8. | "Hemlock" | 2:48 |
| 9. | "Pyramus and Thisbe" | 1:58 |
| 10. | "Match Girl" | 3:05 |
| 11. | "Bustop" | 3:57 |
| 12. | "Monitor" | 3:51 |
| 13. | "Happy" | 4:40 |

== Personnel ==
Adapted from The Return of Red Emma liner notes.

- Lida Husik – lead vocals, guitar, bass guitar, keyboards, production

Musicians

- Jamie Harley – drums, percussion
- Kramer – bass guitar (2, 3, 11), Hammond organ (2, 11)

Production and additional personnel

- DAM – design
- Michael Macioce – photography
- Ron Paul – production, engineering

== Release history ==
| Region | Date | Label | Format | Catalog |
|---|---|---|---|---|
| United States | 1993 | Shimmy Disc | CD, CS, LP | shimmy 062 |
