= Lida Husik =

- Born: Lida Husik; 1963 (age 62–63)
- Origin: Washington, D.C., United States
- Genre: Rock
- Occupations: Singer, songwriter, record producer
- Years active: 1991–2006
- Labels: Shimmy Disc, Astralwerks, Caroline Records, Alias Records, General Production Recordings

Lida Husik (born 1963) is an American Washington, D.C./ New York City-based musician, who was active mainly in the 1990s. She released three albums for New York-based label Shimmy Disc. She later signed a deal with Caroline Records/Astralwerks, releasing a psychedelic record for Astralwerks and a more folky record for Caroline Records. In her later years she moved to Los Angeles and signed to Alias Records, recording three records for them. Husik disappeared from the music scene until she self-released a new single to digital outlets in 2006. In 2018, she released a 10 track digital album, Motheroceanmorning, under her own label Husik Musik.

== History ==
Lida Husik was born in 1963 in Washington, D.C. Starting in third grade, she learned violin and performed in her grade school band, Lafayette Elementary School orchestra. Eventually she taught herself how to play the drums and joined the punk band the Mourning Glories, which also included Peter Hayes of High-Back Chairs and Mitch Parker of Government Issue. During her brief time with the Mourning Glories, Husik learned about 4-track recording and decided to pursue a career as a solo artist.

Husik performed and recorded as Red Emma in the late 1980s, issuing the song "Candle" (which the Washington City Paper described as "haunting") under that name on Dischord Records' 1989 compilation, State of the Union. Husik was also a member of the punk activist group Positive Force DC for nearly a year during this period, later joking to The Washington City Paper that she "was the small negative force within the Positive Force” [and] “I couldn’t keep El Salvador and Nicaragua straight.”

Eventually Don Fleming, frontman of the Velvet Monkeys, introduced Husik to the musician and producer Kramer. Through Shimmy Disc, Kramer's record label, Husik released her debut album Bozo. By that point, she had taught herself how to play several instruments, including guitar, bass guitar, and piano. In 1994, she caught the attention of Beaumont Hannant, a British producer and DJ and collaborated with him on projects.

== Discography ==
=== Albums ===
- Bozo (CD) – Shimmy Disc (1991)
- Your Bag (CD) – Shimmy Disc (1992)
- The Return of Red Emma (CD) – Shimmy Disc (1992)
- Evening at the Grange (With Beaumont Hannant) (CD) – Astralwerks (1994)
- Joyride (CD) – Caroline Records (1995)
- Green Blue Fire (As Husikesque) (CD) – Astralwerks/Caroline Records (1996)
- Fly Stereophonic – (CD) Alias Records (1997)
- Faith in Space – (CD) Alias Records (1998)
- Mad Flavor – (CD) Alias Records (1999)
- Nuclear Soul – (Digital Single) Husik Musik (2006)
- Motheroceanmorning – (Cassette & Digital Album) Husik Musik (2018)
