= We R Are Why =

Single by Autechre
- B-side: "Are Y Are We?"
- Released: 14 April 1996
- Genre: Ambient techno
- Length: 14:43
- Label: Warp
- Producer: Autechre

Autechre singles chronology
"Tri Repetae" (1995)	"We R Are Why" (1996)	"Envane" (1997)

"We R Are Why" is an Autechre 12-inch single released by mail-order and available at some concerts, by Warp Records in 1996. It was written and produced by Rob Brown and Sean Booth.

Sean Booth:
"we r are why were the first two tracks we did on the ry30
they're both entirely done in the ry30 – with a bit of fx on the diff channels maybe, can't rem"

== Track listing ==
All tracks are written by Sean Booth and Rob Brown.

No.	Title	Length
1.	"We R Are Why"	8:35
2.	"Are Y Are We?"	6:08
Total length:		14:43

There is intentionally no speed listed on the release. In an "AAA (Ask Autechre Anything)" on the site WATMM (We Are The Music Makers), Sean Booth stated "our original intention [was] to not write it on the record". The durations above were measured when the vinyl was played at 45 rpm.
