= MiniDVD (disambiguation) =

MiniDVD is a physically smaller 80mm version of the standard-sized 120mm DVD, often used in camcorders.

Mini DVD or Mini-DVD may also refer to

- cDVD or mini-DVD, a standard CD with data written to it in the DVD-video format
- Universal Media Disc or Mini DVD, a format used by Sony's PlayStation Portable

== See also ==
- Minidisk (disambiguation)
