= Green Blue Fire =

Studio album by Husikesque
- Released: April 1996
- Recorded: Spring 1995
- Studios: T.T.B., Wakefield, England
- Genre: Alternative rock
- Length: 48:09
- Label: Astralwerks
- Producers: Richard Brown, Beaumont Hannant

Lida Husik chronology
Joyride (1995)	Green Blue Fire (1996)	Fly Stereophonic (1997)

Green Blue Fire is an album by Lida Husik and Beaumont Hannant. It was released in 1996 through Astralwerks.

== Conception ==
The album was inspired by Husik's travels in York, England.

== Critical reception ==
Professional ratings
Review scores
Source	Rating
AllMusic	4/5 stars
The Encyclopedia of Popular Music	3/5 stars
MusicHound Rock: The Essential Album Guide	3.5/5 stars
Muzik	4/10

The Washington Post called the album "wispy, neo-psychedelic electronic music." Trouser Press called it "by turns stark, still and catchy." CMJ New Music Monthly called Green Blue Fire "chill-out ambient folk—groovy at times, dull at others."

== Track listing ==
All tracks are written by Lida Husik, except "Starburst 7," co-written by Beaumont Hannant.

No.	Title	Length
1.	"The Bird"	5:01
2.	"Bad Head Day"	4:30
3.	"Haunt Me"	3:25
4.	"Wonderland"	5:59
5.	"River Ouse"	3:07
6.	"Just Like Candy"	4:58
7.	"All Hands on Deck"	5:09
8.	"Starburst 7"	5:47
9.	"Soul of Gold"	3:31
10.	"Dead Radio"	6:42

== Personnel ==
- Richard Brown – keyboards, percussion, production, engineering
- Beaumont Hannant – keyboards, percussion, production, engineering
- Wendi Horowitz – design
- Lida Husik – vocals, guitar, keyboards, photography
