= Team Doyobi =

Electronic music duo

- Origin: The Wolds, Lincolnshire, England
- Genres: Experimental, Electronic, Chiptune (IDM, Glitch, Ambient); Industrial, Hip-hop, Electro
- Years active: 1991–present
- Labels: FatCat Records, Skam, Alku.
- Members: Christopher Gladwin; Alexander Peverett
- Website: www.teamdoyobi.com

Team Doyobi are an electronic music duo, consisting of Christopher Gladwin and Alexander Peverett, currently signed to Skam Records. Their music has been described as glitchy, 8-bit (due to their early use of the Commodore Amiga personal computer), psychedelic and inspired by video games and movie soundtracks of the 1970s and 1980s.

== History ==
Team Doyobi began their collaboration by producing electronic soundtracks for self-made video art in the early 1990s. They made early use of obsolete computers as serious musical instruments. Their early compositional techniques exploited the sound synthesis methods and nuances of the machines themselves and did not use their abilities as sequencers for external hardware devices. Team Doyobi's early sound combined simple synth leads and basslines with funk, R&B or soul-like rhythms, overall rendering a stripped-down funky sound. Their early releases were entirely created using Commodore sound chips with no use of MIDI, synthesizers or other musical hardware. Although the technology they use has changed over recent years.

They performed at All Tomorrow's Parties in 2003 and 2004 and provided support for Autechre on the European leg of their 2001 tour.

== Discography ==
- Req / Team Doyobi split 12" series (FatCat, 1999)
- Lucky Kitchen / Team Doyobi 7" (FatCat, 2000)
- Push Chairs For Grown Ups, EP, CD and vinyl (Skam, 2000)
- Cryptoburners, album, CD and vinyl (Skam, 2001)
- Demons To Diamonds, vinyl single (Skam, 2001)
- DF0:BAD, vinyl EP (Skam, 2002)
- Mod Truckin' , vinyl single (Skam, 2003)
- Antiquity, vinyl EP (Skam, 2004)
- Choose Your Own Adventure, album, CD and vinyl (Skam, 2004)
- The Kphanapic Fragments, album, CD (Skam, 2006)
- Wheels Of Anterion, vinyl single (Skam, 2006)
- ORCH V, vinyl EP (Skam, 2009)
- Digital Music Volume 1, vinyl EP (Skam, 2012)
- Digital Music Volume 2, vinyl EP (Skam, 2013)
