= Tri Repetae =

- Standard vinyl cover

Studio album by Autechre
- Released: 6 November 1995
- Genres: IDM; electronica; ambient
- Length: 72:29
- Label: Warp
- Producer: Autechre

Autechre chronology
Anvil Vapre (1995)	Tri Repetae (1995)	We R Are Why (1996)

Tri Repetae (stylised as tri repetae.) is the third studio album by English electronic music duo Autechre, released on 6 November 1995 by Warp. The style of the album differs from Incunabula (1993) and Amber (1994), their previous albums on the label. The album received positive reviews upon release, and has since been regularly recognized as one of the most influential electronic albums of all time.

== Background ==
In contrast to Incunabula (1993) and Amber (1994), Tri Repetae features a distinct style that incorporates more minimal, repetitive rhythmic patterns and intricate, spacious arrays of melodies. In the time leading up to the production of the album, Booth and Brown had both been Sheffield residents, with Sean moving both house and studio next door to Jez Potter, a friend and fellow experimental producer and DJ who introduced the duo to his collaborator Mat Steel, and additionally the English experimental artist Mark Fell. Potter had been performing DJ sets across the United Kingdom at clubs with dedicated "ambient rooms", such as the London venue Megatripolis; Booth and Brown had also been appearing regularly and anonymously alongside Fell on weekly radio broadcasts by Potter on the Sheffield pirate radio station Foulmouth FM. Subsequently, Tri Repetae marked a significant change in both the duo's musical style and their approach to music production, inspired by the glitch music of Potter and Fell.

The aesthetical shift was intentionally echoed by its album cover designed by the duo's visual collaborators The Designers Republic, where the studio and the band decided on a solid hex colour, symbolically representing the combination of metallic (technology) and green (nature) tones. The tone of the cover has varied throughout the album's release editions. Stemming from Autechre's increasing preoccupation with unique electronic musical textures and glitches, the liner notes of the album mention a preference to listen to the album on vinyl for surface noise; the CD version states that the album is "incomplete without surface noise", whereas the vinyl version satisfactorily states that it is "complete with surface noise".

== Release ==
Tri Repetae was accompanied by a tour; Surgeon, Simon Pyke (Freeform) and Jez Potter accompanied the band as opening DJs on much of its UK leg. In preparation for the 1997 release of the duo's fourth studio album Chiastic Slide, Tri Repetae was rereleased on 16 March 1996 by Wax Trax! Records and TVT Records in the United States as a two-disc set named Tri Repetae++, which included the Garbage and Anvil Vapre EPs constituting the second CD. In Japan, it was released with the bonus track "Medrey".

On 11 November 2016, Tri Repetae was re-released on vinyl by Warp, along with their two previous albums, Incunabula and Amber.

== Critical reception and legacy ==
Professional ratings
Review scores
Source	Rating
AllMusic	5/5 stars
Encyclopedia of Popular Music	4/5 stars
Muzik	4/5 stars
Pitchfork	9.0/10
Record Collector	4/5 stars
The Rolling Stone Album Guide	4/5 stars
Select	4/5
Spin	7/10
The Sydney Morning Herald	4/5 stars

Tri Repetae received critical acclaim upon release. In a five-star review, Ned Raggett of AllMusic described it as "a varied, accomplished album, clear evidence of Autechre's unique genius around sound." Sue Cummings of Spin magazine wrote that Autechre had "take[n] their place as electronic pioneers alongside Saunderson and even Kraftwerk," calling Tri Repetae "electronic music as emotionally resonant as you're likely to find." Vaughn Allen for Muzik variously described the album as "unsettling, skin-crawling" and "sticky-fingered, investigating the depths of [Autechre's] machines".

Tri Repetae has been retrospectively described as a "seminal intelligent dance music record," a "turning point" in electronic music, and a watershed moment for IDM. In 2017, Pitchfork ranked it at number three on its list of "The 50 Best IDM Albums of All Time," and Treblezine ranked it as the 8th best electronic album of the 1990s. In 2018, Mixmag ranked the album as the 25th most influential dance album of all time.

== Track listing ==
All tracks are written by Sean Booth and Rob Brown.

Tri Repetae
No.	Title	Length
1.	"Dael"	6:39
2.	"Clipper"	8:33
3.	"Leterel"	7:08
4.	"Rotar"	8:04
5.	"Stud"	9:40
6.	"Eutow"	4:16
7.	"C/Pach"	4:39
8.	"Gnit"	5:49
9.	"Overand"	7:33
10.	"Rsdio"	10:08
Total length:		72:29

Japanese edition bonus track
No.	Title	Length
11.	"Medrey"	4:12
Total length:		76:41

Tri Repetae++ US bonus disc
No.	Title	Taken from	Length
1.	"Second Bad Vilbel"	Anvil Vapre	9:45
2.	"Second Scepe"	Anvil Vapre	7:44
3.	"Second Scout"	Anvil Vapre	7:21
4.	"Second Peng"	Anvil Vapre	10:53
5.	"Garbagemx36"	Garbage	14:11
6.	"PIOBmx19"	Garbage	7:37
7.	"Bronchusevenmx24"	Garbage	9:44
8.	"VLetrmx21"	Garbage	8:27
Total length:			75:42

== Charts ==
Chart (1995)	Peak position
UK Albums (Official Charts)	86
