= Amber (Autechre album) =

Studio album by Autechre
- Released: 7 November 1994
- Genres: IDM; ambient
- Length: 74:27
- Label: Warp
- Producers: Rob Brown; Sean Booth

Autechre chronology
Anti EP (1994)	Amber (1994)	Garbage (1995)

Amber is the second studio album by the British electronic music duo Autechre, released on 7 November 1994 by Warp. Unlike their debut album, Incunabula, which predominantly compiled earlier recordings, Amber was conceived as a new studio album. It entered the CIN's Dance Albums Chart at no. 7. Amber received mostly positive contemporary reviews, while retrospective assessments have been more mixed. It has also appeared in retrospective lists of notable electronic albums.

== Production and style ==
Unlike Incunabula, which was part of Warp's Artificial Intelligence series and predominantly compiled older material, Amber was described by Autechre member Rob Brown as "genuinely the first album we put out on Warp".

In a 1994 interview conducted shortly after the album's release, Brown and Sean Booth said that they shared a house and worked from a home studio, preferring to handle production themselves rather than use commercial studios. Their setup at the time included an Ensoniq EPS-16 Plus sampler, Roland R-8 drum machine, Roland Juno-106 synthesizer, Seck 18:8:2 mixing console, Alesis Quadraverb effects processor and an Atari ST computer. Describing their computer-based sequencing, Booth said they had settled on Emagic's Creator after briefly using Cubase, as Creator was better suited to their loop-oriented methods.

Booth said that Amber made substantially greater use of the EPS-16 Plus than Incunabula, describing the album as "almost total EPS experimentation" involving the sampler's internal effects and resampling capabilities. Brown said the duo generally began a track with a small group of sounds that would determine its rhythm, while Booth described pitch and note duration as rhythmic elements rather than treating melody as conventional tune-writing. Booth later said that most of the album's tracks were created in "less than a day" each.

Select described the album as a "'90s update of electro's cut-'n'-paste rhythmics into the realms of the odd," and stated that Amber "made music by μ-Ziq or Aphex Twin seem almost conventional." CMJ described the sound of Amber as "entirely electronic and entirely instrumental" outside a few vocal samples. In a 2013 retrospective feature, Fact described Amber as containing "some of Autechre's most ambient moments," and compared several songs ("Nine" and "Yulquen") to the works of Brian Eno, saying that their "beatless, but powerful low-end means that they’re contemplative rather than ethereal". Fact also described songs such as "Montreal" and "Piezo" as uniquely-styled pieces with "deep veins of techno and acid house".

== Release ==
Amber was first released by Warp on 7 November 1994 on compact disc, double vinyl and cassette. It entered the CIN's Dance Albums Chart at no. 7 on 19 November. The album was released in the United States on 24 January 1995 by Wax Trax! and TVT Records. Designed by Ian Anderson of The Designers Republic, the cover art is a detail of a panoramic photograph of sandstone cliffs in Cappadocia, Turkey, taken by landscape photographer Nick Meers.

The album has subsequently been reissued in all major formats, including digital download. Warp reissued Autechre's first three albums—Incunabula, Amber and Tri Repetae—on vinyl on 11 November 2016.

== Critical reception ==
Professional ratings
Review scores
Source	Rating
AllMusic	4.5/5 stars
Encyclopedia of Popular Music	3/5 stars
Pitchfork	7.9/10
Record Collector	4/5 stars
The Rolling Stone Album Guide	2.5/5 stars
Select	4/5

Upon release, Amber received mostly positive reviews from professional critics. Select's Gareth Grundy rated the album four out of five, describing Autechre as "out on the fringes, having a good rummage for the weird and beautiful," and stating that the album was not "goalless experimentation. There's plenty of melody on board, it's just that it creeps up on you from behind." CMJ writer Heidi MacDonald noted that Autechre's more rhythmic music, such as "Glitch" and "Piezo," is "almost hypnotically listenable" but that slower tracks were "dangerously close to new age". Ned Raggett of AllMusic gave the album a four-and-a-half star rating out of five, and compared the album to Incunabula, opining that "a couple of tracks could be removed with no problem, while tracks like "Montreal" and "Slip" continue the basic Incunabula formula without noticeable change." Raggett concluded that "things are clearly starting to gel a little more here than on previous releases; the great leap forward becomes all the more logical in retrospect."

Retrospective reviews of Amber have been somewhat more mixed. In The New Rolling Stone Album Guide, critic Ben Sisario gave both Incunabula and Amber two and half stars out of five, describing them as "smart if unexciting ambient watercolors" that "give no indication of the innovations to follow". Writing about Amber upon the occasion of the 2016 vinyl reissue, Pitchfork's Andy Beta stated that the melodies of "Slip" had not aged well, and that parts of "Glitch" and "Piezo" were "dulled and gentle in hindsight, knowing just what nasty and brutish sounds [Autechre] would soon wring out of their gear." He concluded that "What makes Amber fascinating to revisit decades on is to hear vestigial organs and sonic cul-de-sacs that Autechre would bin almost immediately after. ... prov[ing] that at one point the duo was human after all."

== Legacy ==
Since its release, Amber has appeared in retrospective lists of notable electronic albums. In 2017, Pitchfork ranked Amber at number 16 on its list of "The 50 Best IDM Albums of All Time". In 2022, MusicRadar included Amber in a feature on 30 of the best electronic albums of the previous 30 years.

Despite being held in high regard by critics, the band has expressed dissatisfaction with the simplicity of the record's sound compared to their later work. In 2008, Rob Brown described listening to Incunabula and Amber again, and commented on "how cheesy they were, and how contrasted our newer ideas are." Brown clarified his statement in 2013, explaining that the comment "was easily misinterpreted" and that he simply intended to say that the earlier albums "were perhaps more simple [than their more recent work], but not in a shit way."

== Track listing ==
All tracks are written by Sean Booth and Robert Brown.

No.	Title	Length
1.	"Foil"	6:04
2.	"Montreal"	7:15
3.	"Silverside"	5:31
4.	"Slip"	6:21
5.	"Glitch"	6:15
6.	"Piezo"	8:00
7.	"Nine"	3:40
8.	"Further"	10:07
9.	"Yulquen"	6:37
10.	"Nil"	7:48
11.	"Teartear"	6:45
Total length:		74:27

== Personnel ==
Credits adapted from the liner notes of Amber.

- Autechre – production
- The Designers Republic – design

== Charts ==
Chart (1994)	Peak position
81
Dance Albums Chart (CIN)	7

== See also ==
- 1994 in music
- Music of the United Kingdom (1990s)
