= Posthuman (band) =

English electronic music duo

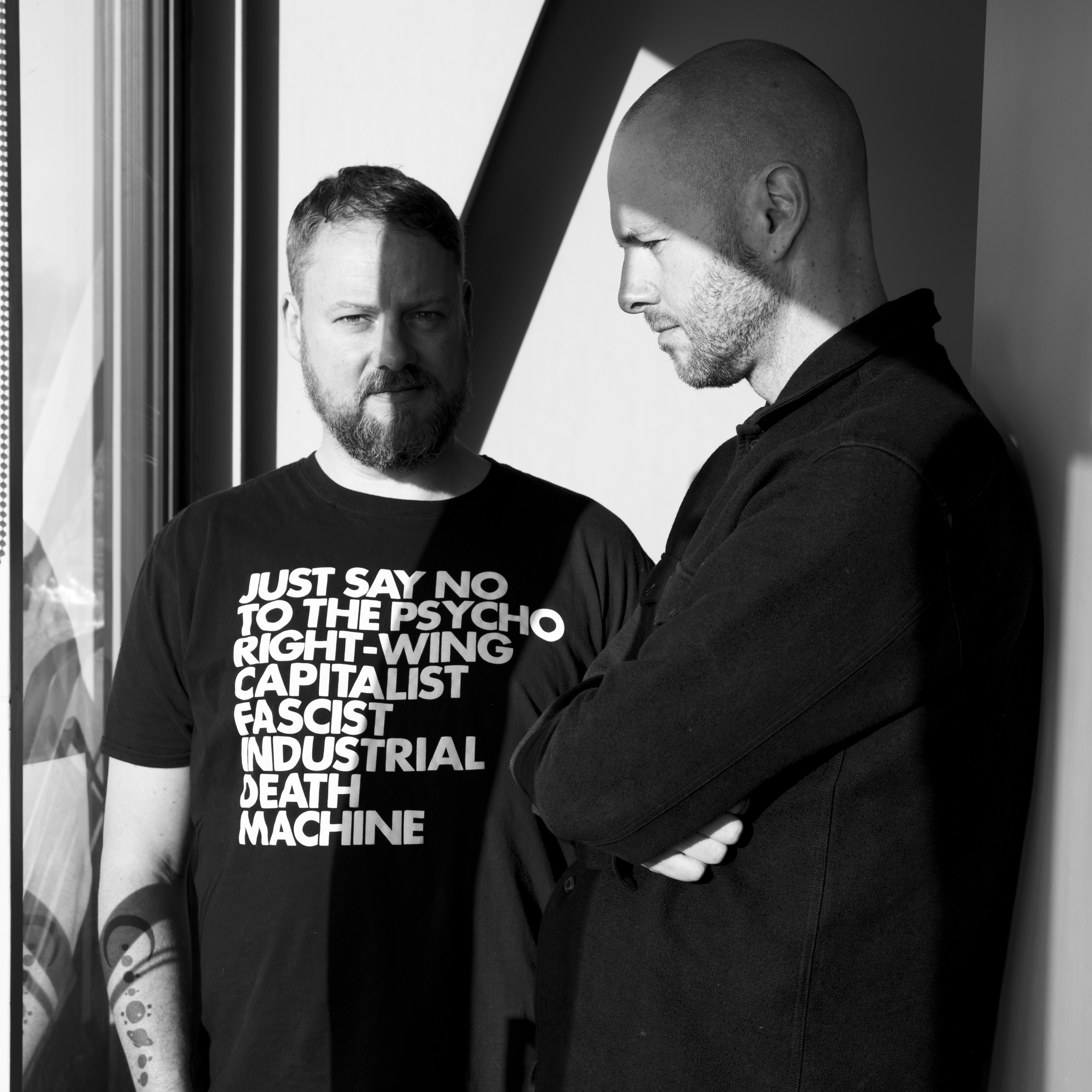

Background information
- Origin: London, England and Glasgow, Scotland
- Genres: IDM techno electronica Acid house
- Years active: 1999 – present
- Labels: Seed Records, Balkan Vinyl, The Dark Outside
- Members: Richard Bevan, Joshu Doherty
- Website: posthumanmusic.com

Posthuman are an electronic music duo consisting of cousins Richard Bevan and Joshu Doherty. They run the I Love Acid record label and clubnight.

Establishing themselves in the early 2000s as part of the London IDM scene, through the following years the pair experimented with various styles and genres, including electronica, ambient music, post-rock, and Detroit techno.

Since 2010 their sound has been categorised as Acid house. The pair are regarded amongst the foremost champions of the UK Acid House scene.

== Band biography ==
Richard and Joshu first wrote music together as teenagers. In 1999, they sent their first demo CD to Skam Records, resulting in a release on the label's SMAK series.

In 2000, the pair moved to London and began running a series of electronic music club nights under the name 'Seed'. These nights increased in size and soon relocated to Aldwych tube station, a disused underground train station. A number of these events took place between 2001 and 2004, among the artists who appeared were Aphex Twin, Alison Goldfrapp, Richard X, Plaid, and Funkstörung. On the back of this series of events, the pair set up their own record label Seed Records, as an outlet for their own material, and music by other artists who had appeared at the 'Seed' events.

The last of these events were to be held on 13 and 14 November 2004, however, John Peel, who was booked to DJ, passed away around a fortnight before the event. The following week, the event was canceled due to London Underground rescinding the venue hire, and on the night of the event, John Balance of Coil (who were also on the bill to play) also died. Soon after, Joshu left Seed Records to work briefly for B12 Records. In 2010 he founded a new imprint Balkan Vinyl.

Since 2007, Joshu has run the Acid House club night I Love Acid and its associated vinyl-only record label from 2014, named after the track by Luke Vibert, who features regularly. In 2019 it won the DJ Mag Best British Club Event award.

The artwork for their 2010 album Syn Emergence was based around Bevan's award winning visual project of the same name.

In 2018, their album Mutant City Acid was pressed on randomly coloured vinyl, with the entire process livestreamed on video from the pressing plant. As opposed to manual pressing, marbled or mixed colour vinyl, this experimental randomised process was the first time this has been done successfully, leading to almost 100 different colour variations of the double album.

== Album Discography ==
Title	Format	Label	Catalog number	Formats	Year	Notes
Posthuman	Album	Seed Records	SEEDEX01	CD	2000	Hand made sleeves in various colours (Blue, Grey, Brown, and Black)
The Uncertainty of the Monkey	Album	Seed Records	SEEDLP/CD01	Double 12" vinyl & CD	2001	
Lagrange Point	Album	Seed Records	SEED09	CD	2003	
The People's Republic	Album	Seed Records	SEEDCD12	CD	2006	
Hilda Family Remixed	Mini-album	Myuzyk	MZYKN08CD	CD	2008	Remix album, hand made sleeve, limited edition.
Syn Emergence	Album	Balkan Vinyl	BV07	Double 12" vinyl & CD	2010	Two editions: double picturedisc & double heavyweight.
Datalinks	Mini-album	n/a	n/a	Digital	2011	Collection of unreleased material from 2000-2010.
Back To Acid	Compilation Album	Balkan Recordings	BD06	Digital	2016	A collection of previously released tracks from various compilations, EPs, and singles.
Mutant City Acid	Album	Balkan Vinyl	BV29	Double 12" vinyl	2018	Pressed on experimental random coloured vinyl
Voyager 3	Mini-album	The Dark Outside	TDO013	Cassette	2019	Limited Edition.
20/20	Compilation Album	Tsar Bomba	TB202	Digital	2020	Collected works from 2001-2020
Requiem For A Rave	Album	Balkan Vinyl	BV50	Double 12" vinyl & cassette	2021	
Echo Almaz East	Mini-album	The Dark Outside	TDO65	Cassette	2022	Two editions; Blue artwork & Red artwork
The Mind is a Heavy Burden	Album	Flatlife Recordings	FLATLP02	Vinyl	2025	Purple vinyl.
