= Geometry (Jega album) =

Studio album by Jega
- Released: 16 October 2000
- Genre: Electronic
- Length: 56:15
- Label: Planet Mu

Jega chronology
Spectrum (1998)	Geometry (2000)	Variance (2009)

Geometry is the second album by the electronic musician Jega, released in 2000 on the Planet Mu and Matador labels.

== Track listing ==
No.	Title	Length
1.	"Alternating Bit"	4:09
2.	"Syntax Tree"	4:00
3.	"Recursion"	4:25
4.	"Geometry"	4:36
5.	"Rigid Body Dynamics"	3:56
6.	"Doric"	5:16
7.	"Breakpoint Envelope"	4:48
8.	"Inertia"	5:51
9.	"Binary Space"	2:56
10.	"Static"	4:14
11.	"Post Mid Arc"	4:11
12.	"Motion Math"	4:44
13.	"Subdivision Surfaces"	3:10

== Reception ==
Professional ratings
Review scores
Source	Rating
Pitchfork	6.5/10
AllMusic	4/5 stars
PopMatters	(not rated)
Chicago Reader	(not rated)
Headphone Commute	Favorable

Sam Eccleston, writing for Pitchfork, called the album "a fascinating, if not moving, musical experience". Mike Bruno of the Chicago Reader wrote a similarly positive review and compared it with Jega's previous album Spectrum, stating that Geometry for Jega "represents a step toward being taken more seriously as an electronic composer".
