= Variance (album) =

Studio album by Jega
- Released: 20 July 2009
- Genre: Electronic
- Length: 38:01 (Vol 1); 37:31 (Vol 2); 75:32 (total)
- Label: Planet Mu
- Producer: Dylan J Nathan

Jega chronology
Geometry (2000)	Variance (2009)

Professional ratings
Review scores
Source	Rating
Headphone Commute	link

Variance is the third album by the electronic musician, Jega, released on 20 July 2009 by Planet Mu.

== Track listing ==
Vol 1
No.	Title	Length
1.	"SoulFlute"	4:41
2.	"Antiphon"	4:43
3.	"Moment"	3:07
4.	"The Girl Who Fell to Earth"	4:44
5.	"Sakura"	4:42
6.	"Eva"	4:27
7.	"Dreams"	4:36
8.	"Aqueminae"	4:01
9.	"Zenith"	3:00

Vol 2
No.	Title	Length
1.	"Tensor"	0:32
2.	"Shibuya"	4:02
3.	"Chromadynamic"	4:44
4.	"Cascade Decoherence"	3:39
5.	"Aerodynamic"	4:36
6.	"Latinhypercube"	4:59
7.	"Kyoto"	5:22
8.	"Hydrodynamic"	4:23
9.	"Reprise"	5:14
