= Your Bag =

Studio album by Lida Husik
- Released: July 7, 1992
- Recorded: 1991
- Studios: Noise New York (New York City, NY)
- Genres: Psychedelic rock, alternative rock
- Length: 46:26
- Label: Shimmy Disc
- Producers: Jamie Harley, Lida Husik, Kramer

Lida Husik chronology
Bozo (1991)	Your Bag (1992)	The Return of Red Emma (1993)

Your Bag is the second studio album by singer-songwriter Lida Husik, released in 1992 by Shimmy Disc.

== Production ==
Husik worked on the album with Jamie Harley and Kramer. Husik originally intended to record an EP, but was encouraged to lengthen the songs by Kramer.

== Critical reception ==
Professional ratings
Review scores
Source	Rating
AllMusic	3/5 stars
Chicago Sun-Times	3.5/4 stars
MusicHound Rock: The Essential Album Guide	2.5/5 stars

The Chicago Tribune called the album "stark, acoustic existentialism accented by feedback guitars." The Village Voice deemed it an "obscure [gem] of 1960s-inspired, punkily energetic, whispery songcraft." The Cincinnati Enquirer considered it to be "one of the most subtly psychedelic albums of the 1990s."

== Track listing ==
All tracks are written by Lida Husik.

No.	Title	Length
1.	"Your Bag"	5:20
2.	"Toy Surprise"	7:10
3.	"Whirlybird"	7:00
4.	"Ship Going Down"	4:24
5.	"Marcel"	9:24
6.	"Candy Store"	2:15
7.	"The Match from Mars"	10:35

== Personnel ==
Adapted from Your Bag liner notes.

- Lida Husik – lead vocals, guitar, keyboards, production

Musicians

- Jamie Harley – drums, percussion, additional vocals, production, engineering

Production and additional personnel

- Kramer – production
- Michael Macioce – photography

== Release history ==
Region	Date	Label	Format	Catalog
United States	1992	Shimmy Disc	CD, CS, LP	shimmy 056
