= L-event =

EP by Autechre
- Released: 11 October 2013 (download); 28 October 2013 (CD/LP)
- Length: 26:04
- Label: Warp
- Producer: Autechre

Autechre chronology
Exai (2013)	L-event (2013)	AE_LIVE (2015)

L-event is an EP by electronic music duo Autechre, released on Warp Records on 28 October 2013. The EP is a companion to Autechre's double album Exai, which was released earlier in the same year. The music was composed at the same time as the tracks of Exai using the same custom software system, with the band deciding to release them separately during the sequencing of the album. The EP features similar cover art to Exai, and according to the band is considered as "interchangeable" with the four 12" discs of the vinyl release of Exai. "Distorted" versions of popular websites such as CBS News and The Huffington Post were created to promote the album, with the music streaming in the background as the pages became increasingly corrupted. Like Exai, the music received generally favorable reviews from professional critics.

== Background and Production ==
On 7 February 2013, Autechre released the double album Exai. According to the band in an interview with The Quietus, the tracks of L-event were composed at the same time as those released on Exai, but when sequencing the album it became clear that they would work better as a separate release. Like Exai, the tracks of L-event were composed using custom software developed by the group following the release of Oversteps. According to group member Rob Brown, the material of L-event, "shares the same dialect and the same language as the album, but remains specific to that one single release." In a November 2013 "Ask Autechre Everything" event, group member Sean Booth said that Exai was originally envisioned as a set of four 12" EPs, with L-event being "as interchangeable with any of the 12"s in exai (which we see as a box of four 12"s)."

== Style and Composition ==
Rob Brown has described the tracks as, "a little bit more rude, a little more aggressive," compared with the music of Exai, a sentiment shared by critics such as Aaron Gonsher of XLR8R, who described it as "an exhausting listen, one that offers an experience of immersion, not itemization." Nick Neyland of Pitchfork described the "edges" of the music as being "sharper."

Opener "Tac Lacora" was described by Andy Kellman of Allmusic as "all mangled shards, confrontational to the point of provoking agitation," with Angus Finlayson of Resident Advisor describing it as a "glitch-mulch onslaught." Brown said that it was obvious from its creation that the track "was going to be fairly heavy and worthwhile to start the EP," saying that they wanted to achieve "balance where things felt like they were flying off the rails, but at the same time we know exactly where we’re going with it."

According to Brown, field recordings of rain and "city life" were used to compose the second track "M39 Diffain," having been inspired by walking through New York City in the rain to an Untold concert while listening to headphones. The track was described by critics as having "a startling degree of sharpness," and being an "endlessly iterative beat workout."

The third track "Osla For N" has been described as opening with a "mangled hip-hop-drone" before "drifting," incorporating "stark percussion that resembles a fusion of struck woodblocks and dog barks." The closing track "newbound" has been described as having "glistening synth work," with XLR8R's Aaron Goshner noting "a surprising tenderness beneath the requisite squawks and feints" and comparing the track to the work of Boards of Canada. Brown called it "more straight-laced compared to the first three tracks" and expressed how he enjoyed that others had compared it with the style of the group's early work.

== Release ==
Like Exai, L-event features album artwork and packaging by The Designer's Republic. It was released on 28 October 2013 as a CD and LP, accompanied with either a downloadable .mp3 or .WAV version of the album when purchased from Bleep.com. On 11 October 2013, the digital version of the EP was released, with it streaming on "corrupted" versions of certain websites including Telegraph, Ableton, Bloomberg News, CBS News, Huffington Post and Warp Record's own site, with the pages distorting and the images being replaced with the L-event album cover.

== Reception ==
Professional ratings
Aggregate scores
Source	Rating
Metacritic	(70/100)
Review scores
Source	Rating
Allmusic	4/5 stars
Pitchfork Media	(6.4/10)
Resident Advisor	(4.0/5)
The Skinny	4/5 stars
Tiny Mix Tapes	(3.5/5)
Under the Radar	4/10 stars

Upon release, L-event received generally positive reviews from professional critics, with an average score of 70/100 on Metacritic.

Andy Kellman of AllMusic described L-event as some of Autechre's "most direct, least complex output", but said it was just as interesting as some of their more complicated works, calling it "inspired and frequently sensational". Nick Neyland of Pitchfork praised "how well they can still transform their overriding preoccupation with digital interference into sound," however noting "a creeping sense that Brown and Booth are looping back on themselves, returning to ground they've already covered in abundance."

In a more critical review, Dan Lucas of Under the Radar found that "the industrial-sounding smoke and mirrors are for once actually masking very little," criticizing its short run time as not allowing for "something resembling accessibility" compared with their longer LPs.

== Track listing ==
All tracks are written by Sean Booth and Rob Brown

No.	Title	Length
1.	"tac Lacora"	6:04
2.	"M39 Diffain"	5:46
3.	"Osla for n"	8:11
4.	"newbound"	6:03
Total length:		26:04

== Release history ==
Country/Region	Date	Label	Format	Catalogue number
UK	28 October 2013	Warp Records	1×CD	WAPCD345
UK	28 October 2013	Warp Records	1×LP	WAPLP345
