= Wevie Stonder =

British band

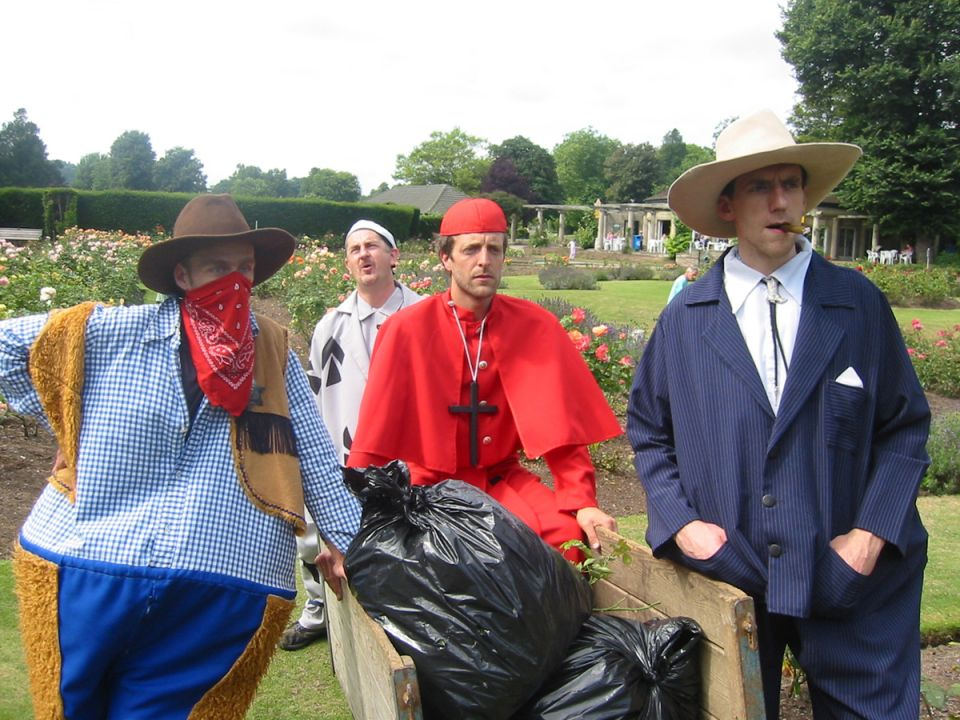

Background information
- Also known as: Wevie De Crepon
- Origin: United Kingdom
- Genres: Experimental; Comedy
- Years active: 1993–present
- Labels: Cack Records; Skam Records; Sonig
- Website: www.weviestonder.com

Wevie Stonder /ˈwiːviː ˈstɒndər/ are a British group formed in Brighton in 1993. They have released five studio albums on Skam Records, Sonig and Cack Records. The band's name is a spoonerism of American R&B and soul musician Stevie Wonder.

== History ==
The band formed in 1993, when their first recording session resulted in a failed cover version of Stevie Wonder's “I just called to say I love you” and marked the birth of Wevie Stonder, a name which would go on to spark a fad of sponsored names and puns in electronic music (such as Com Truise and Joy Orbison).

Their first LP "Eat Your Own Ears" (its name later taken by the London-based promotions company) was released in 2000, and led to a series of records for Skam, radio sessions for the BBC, and live performances at electronic music nights and festivals around the UK and Europe — with their debut live show at Sonar festival, Barcelona.

After a very long hiatus, Wevie Stonder have a new album, "Sure Beats Living", slated for a release on July 25th 2025 on Skam.

== Discography ==
=== As Wevie Stonder ===
- Eat Your Own Ears (Skam, 2000)
- Drawing on Other People's Heads (Skam, 2002)
- Stoat (Skam, 2002)
- Kenyan Harry EP (Skam, 2003)
- The Wooden Horse of Troy (Skam, 2005)
- The Bucket (CACK, 2009)
- Small People / Shut the Gate (CACK, 2009)
- The Beast of Wevie (CACK, 2017)
- Sure Beats Living (Skam, 2025)

=== As Wevie De Crepon ===
- The Age Old Age of Old Age Mini LP (Sonig, 2003)
- Ton Wah 12 (Sonig, 2004)

=== Remixes ===
- The man with the Xylophone skull (2001) for Rubin Steiner
- King Holer (2002) for Fujiya & Miyagi
- Pushchairs for grown ups (2004) for Team Doyobi
- A buddha made of mud (2007) for Schlammpeitziger

=== Radio sessions ===
- BBC Radio 3 – "Mixing it" hosted by Robert Sandall and Mark Russell, broadcast 2/6/06
- BBC Radio 1 – "Breezeblock" Mary Anne Hobbs, broadcast 3/9/05
