= Garbage (EP) =

- Garbage CD cover

EP by Autechre
- Released: 27 February 1995
- Recorded: Between 1994 and 1995
- Genre: IDM, ambient, dub techno
- Length: 39:59
- Label: Warp
- Producer: Autechre

Autechre chronology
Amber (1994)	Garbage (1995)	Anvil Vapre (1995)

Professional ratings
Review scores
Source	Rating
Allmusic	4.5/5 stars

Garbage is the third EP by British electronic music duo Autechre, released by Warp Records on 27 February 1995. Garbage is a companion to their album Amber, being based on material from the same sessions. The cover and interior illustrations are digitally garbled versions of the cover of Amber.

Garbage was also released alongside Anvil Vapre as part of the US version of Tri Repetae, and as a part of the EPs 1991–2002 compilation.

== Track listing ==
No.	Title	Length
1.	"Garbagemx36"	14:11
2.	"PIOBmx19"	7:37
3.	"Bronchusevenmx24"	9:44
4.	"VLetrmx21"	8:27
Total length:		39:59

The numbers at the end of the track titles are the percentage of the total EP time each track takes up, with the total being 100. The numbers were removed when the EP was included in the EPs 1991–2002 box set.
