= VHS Head =

- Born: Adrian Blacow
- Origin: Blackpool, Lancashire, England
- Genres: Electronic
- Instruments: Sampler, sequencer
- Years active: Since 2009
- Label: Skam

Adrian Blacow, also known by his stage name VHS Head, is a British electronic musician. His work employs samples from found footage, television programmes, and industrial films recorded onto videotape cassettes—namely VHS. Blacow began releasing his music in 2009 under the label Skam Records.

== Discography ==
=== Studio albums ===
- Trademark Ribbons of Gold (2010)
- Persistence of Vision (2014)
- Phocus (2023)

=== Extended plays ===
- Video Club (2009)
- Midnight Section (2011)
- Sarah Eat Neon (2015)
- Phasia (2023)
