= Spectrum (Jega album) =

Studio album by Jega
- Released: 6 July 1998
- Genre: Electronic
- Length: 68:22
- Label: Planet Mu

Jega chronology
Spectrum (1998)	Geometry (2000)

Spectrum is the first album by the electronic musician, Jega, released in 1998 on Planet Mu. The album peaked at #155 on the CMJ Radio Top 200 and #12 on the CMJ RPM Charts in the U.S.

== Track listing ==
No.	Title	Length
1.	"Phalanx"	5:10
2.	"Kid Sista"	3:37
3.	"Muzical Chairz"	3:50
4.	"Red Mullet"	4:55
5.	"Nia"	6:39
6.	"DMC"	8:02
7.	"Brad's Garden Maintenance"	4:41
8.	"German"	2:26
9.	"Intron.IX"	5:46
10.	"Mai"	3:13
11.	"Pitbull"	5:10
12.	"Gemini"	5:03
13.	"Ephem"	3:27
14.	"Bikini Ski Boat"	2:52
15.	"Manic Minor"	3:30
