= Mad Flavor =

Studio album by Lida Husik
- Released: August 10, 1999
- Studios: WGNS, Washington, D.C.
- Genre: Alternative rock
- Length: 58:42
- Label: Alias
- Producers: Charles Bennington, Geoff Turner

Lida Husik chronology
Faith in Space (1998)	Mad Flavor (1999)

Mad Flavor is an album by the singer-songwriter Lida Husik. It was released in 1999 through Alias Records.

== Critical reception ==
Professional ratings
Review scores
Source	Rating
AllMusic	4/5 stars

The Boston Phoenix wrote that "in the absence of strong songs Mad Flavor is merely a beautiful listen that doesn't leave much of a lasting taste." San Francisco Examiner wrote that while Husik's "voice is as lazily melodic as ever, her reliance on electronica-flavored bells and whistles here is more annoying than groundbreaking."

== Track listing ==
All tracks are written by Lida Husik.

No.	Title	Length
1.	"Cactus Garden Days"	4:39
2.	"Dynamite"	4:59
3.	"Jupiterstar"	4:44
4.	"Trash Out Tonight"	5:05
5.	"Glo Stick"	3:57
6.	"State of the Empire"	5:13
7.	"Tantilize"	6:11
8.	"Choco Deluxe"	6:40
9.	"We Saw"	4:40
10.	"The Slide (Reprise)/Angels on the Floor (Angel Beats Long Version)"	12:34

== Personnel ==
Musicians

- Jerry Busher – drums and percussion on "Jupiterstar" and "State of the Empire"
- Brandon Finley – drums on "Cactus Garden Days" and "Trash Out Tonight"
- Lida Husik – vocals, instruments
- Hilary Soldati – cello on "Jupiterstar"
- Seb Thompson – drums on "Dynamite"
- Gregory "El Flaco" Woods – percussion on "Dynamite", "Trash Out Tonight", "Glo Stick" and "We Saw"

Production and additional personnel

- Charles Bennington – production, programming, drum machine, saxophone on "State of the Empire"
- Geoff Turner – production, keyboards on "Trash Out Tonight" and "State of the Empire"
