= Bozo (album) =

Studio album by Lida Husik
- Released: 1991
- Recorded: 1989–1991
- Studio: Various: Inner Ear Studios; (Arlington, VA); Noise New York; (New York City, NY)
- Genre: Psychedelic rock, alternative rock
- Length: 47:32
- Label: Shimmy Disc
- Producer: Lida Husik, Kramer

Lida Husik chronology
Bozo (1991)	Your Bag (1992)

Bozo is the debut studio album of the singer-songwriter Lida Husik, released in 1991 by Shimmy Disc.

== Critical reception ==
Professional ratings
Review scores
Source	Rating
AllMusic	3/5 stars
MusicHound Rock: The Essential Album Guide	3.5/5 stars

Option wrote that the "instrumentation and production here are the stuff of which demos are made, and the promising, disparate numbers ... end up sounding sadly uniform." In 1996, The Village Voice called the album an "obscure [gem] of 1960s-inspired, punkily energetic, whispery songcraft".

== Track listing ==
All tracks are written by Lida Husik, except "Diamond Day," co-written by Jimmy MacCarthy.

No.	Title	Length
1.	"Bozo"	2:46
2.	"Billboard"	4:30
3.	"California Oregon"	4:04
4.	"Diamond Day"	4:15
5.	"Hitchiker"	4:32
6.	"Hateful Hippy Girls"	4:25
7.	"Halloween"	2:42
8.	"Mom"	3:56
9.	"Farmhouse"	4:28
10.	"Snow"	3:12
11.	"Up"	5:04
12.	"To Virginia"	3:31

== Personnel ==
Adapted from Bozo liner notes.

- Lida Husik – lead vocals, instruments, production (7–11)

Musicians

- Brett Ackerman – guitar (5)
- Reverend Chester Hawkins – additional vocals (11)
- Melaney Holman – guitar and bass guitar (7)
- David Licht – drums (3–5)

Production and additional personnel

- Guy Dove – photography
- Kramer – production and engineering (1–6, 12), slide guitar (2)
- Michael Macioce – photography
- Don Zientara – engineering (3–5)

== Release history ==
Region	Date	Label	Format	Catalog
United States	1991	Shimmy Disc	CD, CS, LP	shimmy 046
Europe	1992	Shimmy Disc	CD, LP	SDE 9040
