= Fly Stereophonic =

Studio album by Lida Husik
- Released: June 24, 1997
- Recorded: WGNS, Washington D.C.
- Genre: Alternative rock
- Length: 33:57
- Label: Alias
- Producers: Charles Bennington, Geoff Turner

Lida Husik chronology
Green Blue Fire (1996)	Fly Stereophonic (1997)	Faith in Space (1998)

Fly Stereophonic is the fifth album by the singer-songwriter Lida Husik, released in 1997 through Alias Records.

== Critical reception ==
Professional ratings
Review scores
Source	Rating
AllMusic	4/5 stars
Chicago Tribune	3.5/4 stars
The Encyclopedia of Popular Music	3/5 stars
Entertainment Weekly	B+

The Chicago Tribune wrote that "the deft production touches ... quell any hint of folkish preciousness. What's left is an alluring 34-minute seduction, the songs revealing new layers of wonder with each listen." Salon called the songs "three-minute confections that sound like pop hits from another galaxy." CMJ New Music Monthly called Fly Sterephonic "perhaps Husik's most solid and structured record to date, robust and filled with compact yet expansive songs sung with her lush, incredibly sexy drone."

== Track listing ==
All tracks are written by Lida Husik, except "Ein Symphonie des Grauens," by the Monochrome Set.

No.	Title	Length
1.	"Fly Stereophonic"	2:17
2.	"Fade Sister Cool"	2:35
3.	"Sharon Hill Shadows"	2:08
4.	"Soundman"	2:15
5.	"Cape Fear"	3:13
6.	"Café con Leché"	3:01
7.	"Death Trip"	1:53
8.	"Ein Symphonie des Grauens"	2:27
9.	"The Slide"	2:57
10.	"Dead Poets"	2:06
11.	"Chocolate City"	4:07
12.	"Dancing Pants"	4:58

== Personnel ==
- Charles Bennington – production
- Cole Gerst – illustrations
- Lida Husik – vocals, guitar, keyboards, Hammond organ
- Charles Steck – bass guitar
- Geoff Turner – production, engineering
