= Move of Ten =

EP by Autechre
- Released: 14 June 2010 (download); 12 July 2010 (CD/LP)
- Genre: IDM, ambient, techno
- Length: 47:46
- Label: Warp
- Producer: Autechre

Autechre chronology
Oversteps (2010)	Move of Ten (2010)	Exai (2013)

Professional ratings
Review scores
Source	Rating
AllMusic	3.5/5 stars
Drowned in Sound	(7/10)
Fact	(4/5)
The Milk Factory	(4.7/5)
Pitchfork Media	(7.6/10)
Sputnikmusic	(4/5)

Move of Ten is an EP by British electronic music duo Autechre, announced on 25 May 2010 and released by Warp Records in June–July 2010, only a few months after Oversteps, Autechre's tenth major album. Move of Ten features packaging and artwork by The Designers Republic, which according to the band was hand-drawn. It was released in mp3 as well as 16- and 24-bit WAV formats on 14 June 2010 via the bleep.com online music store. A release on CD and two (separate) 12"s followed on 12 July.

Like several other Autechre releases, Move of Ten is classified as an EP by the band despite being long enough to qualify as an LP. In a favorable review, Pitchfork described Move of Ten as "a beat-driven complement to Oversteps' dubstep-nodding ambiance," and as "the most forceful Autechre record in a while."

== Track listing ==
No.	Title	Length
1.	"Etchogon-S"	4:54
2.	"y7"	5:09
3.	"pce freeze 2.8i"	5:13
4.	"rew(1)"	6:18
5.	"nth Dafuseder.b"	5:18
6.	"iris was a pupil"	3:40
7.	"no border"	3:31
8.	"M62"	6:09
9.	"ylm0"	3:29
10.	"Cep puiqMX"	4:10
11.	"ClnChr" (Japanese bonus track)	5:33
Total length:		53:19
