= Peel Session (Autechre EP) =

EP by Autechre
- Released: 11 January 1999
- Genre: IDM
- Length: 25:29
- Label: Warp
- Producer: Autechre

Autechre chronology
LP5 (1998)	Peel Session (1999)	EP7 (1999)

Professional ratings
Review scores
Source	Rating
AllMusic	3/5 stars
Pitchfork	7.7/10

Peel Session is a release by electronic duo Autechre, released on vinyl and CD by Warp Records on 11 January 1999. It consists of material recorded for John Peel's Radio 1 sessions in late 1995. The session was first broadcast on 13 October 1995.

The sleeve is designed by Sheffield-based design agency The Designers Republic.

"Drane" was selected by Warp Records co-founder Steve Beckett as one of his 14 absolute favourite tracks from the Warp catalogue for the Warp20 (Chosen) compilation.

== Track listing ==
All tracks are written by Sean Booth and Rob Brown.

Peel Session track listing
No.	Title	Length
1.	"Milk DX"	6:04
2.	"Inhake 2"	8:36
3.	"Drane"	10:49
Total length:		25:29
