= Lego Feet =

Studio album by Autechre
- Released: 1991 Original release December 2011 Re-Release
- Genre: Electronic music
- Length: 73:49
- Label: Skam Records; SKA001
- Producer: Autechre

Autechre chronology
Lego Feet (1991)	Cavity Job (1991)

Professional ratings
Review scores
Source	Rating
The Milk Factory	(4.7/5)
XLR8R	(8/10)

Lego Feet (also referred to as SKA001CD or simply Ska001) is the sole self-titled studio album by Lego Feet (a predecessor to British electronic music duo Autechre), released in 1991 by Skam Records. Originally released as a vinyl only, Skam Records re-released the album digitally and on CD with a re-ordered track listing in 2011.

== Track listing ==
All tracks are written by Sean Booth and Rob Brown

No.	Title	Length
1.	"Part 1"	19:41
2.	"Part 2"	17:19
3.	"Part 3"	21:46
4.	"Part 4"	15:03
Total length:		73:49
