= Basscadet =

Basscad,EP

EP by Autechre
- Released: 25 April 1994
- Genre: IDM
- Length: 38:25 (CD); 37:23 (3x10"); 30:29 (US 12")
- Label: Warp
- Producer: Autechre

Autechre chronology
Incunabula (1993)	Basscad,EP (1994)	Anti EP (1994)

"Basscadet" is a track released by British electronic music duo Autechre, featured on their debut EP, titled Basscad,EP, released by Warp Records on 25 April 1994 (also known as Basscadet Mixes). The EP consists entirely of remixes of the namesake track, which originally appeared on Incunabula, Autechre's 1993 debut album with Warp Records. It is the only Autechre single to be taken from an album.

The EP was released as a collection of three 10-inch vinyl singles and peaked at number 56 on the UK Singles Chart. It was also released as a CD single with the addition of "Basscadubmx", and the exclusion of "Basscadoublemx" and "12/4cadetmx". "Bcdtmx" was used for the video of "Basscadet", which was directed by Jess Scott Hunter.

Basscad EP was in 2011 included on the compilation EPs 1991–2002. All the Autechre mixes were included, but none of the Beaumont Hannant or Seefeel mixes, making "12/4cadetmx" the only version not to have been released in digital format.

== Track listing ==
All titles are listed without the word "Basscadet" in the liner notes, e.g. the first song is listed as "Bcdtmx".

All tracks are written by Sean Booth and Rob Brown

Basscad,EP 3x10" (10WAP44, 10.WAP.44DP, 10.WAP.44AE)
No.	Title	Remix	Length
1.	"Bcdtmx"		6:49
2.	"Beaumonthannanttwomx"	Beaumont Hannant	8:14
3.	"Seefeelmx"	Seefeel	6:51
4.	"Basscadoublemx"		4:23
5.	"Tazmx"		6:54
6.	"12/4cadetmx"	Beaumont Hannant	4:12
Total length:			37:23

Basscad,EP CD (WAP44CD)
No.	Title	Length
1.	"Bcdtmx"	6:49
2.	"Beaumonthannanttwomx"	8:14
3.	"Seefeelmx"	6:51
4.	"Tazmx"	6:54
5.	"Basscadubmx"	9:37
Total length:		38:25

Basscad,EP 12" US release (12.TVT.8717-0)
No.	Title	Length
1.	"Bcdtmx"	6:49
2.	"Beaumonthannanttwomx"	8:14
3.	"12/4cadetmx"	4:12
4.	"Seefeelmx"	6:51
5.	"Basscadoublemx"	4:23
Total length:		30:29

The US released CD TVT 8717-2 has the same track list as the UK Warp CD.

== Personnel ==
- Autechre – synthesizers, programming, production, engineering
- Beaumont Hannant – additional production and remix on "Beaumonthannanttwomx" and "12/4cadetmx" (credited "Reproduced by ...")
- Mark Clifford from Seefeel – additional production and remix on "Seefeelmx" (credited "Reproduced by ...")
