= Envane =

- Vinyl release cover

EP by Autechre
- Released: 27 January 1997
- Genres: IDM, ambient
- Length: 35:17
- Label: Warp
- Producer: Autechre

Autechre chronology
We R Are Why (1996)	Envane (1997)	Chiastic Slide (1997)

Professional ratings
Review scores
Source	Rating
Allmusic	3/5 stars

Envane is the fifth EP by the British electronic music duo Autechre. It was released on 27 January 1997 through Warp Records. The EP consists of four tracks that all end with the word "quarter". Like Autechre's previous EP Anvil Vapre, Envane was originally released both in a CD version containing all four tracks, and in a vinyl version of two 12" records sold separately, which each contained two tracks apiece.

The cover art was created by Sheffield-based design agency The Designers Republic, with similar but distinct geometric images appearing on the CD copy, and the two vinyl records. In all three cases, the cover art is an abstraction of a photograph of Fallingwater, a modern house designed by American architect Frank Lloyd Wright. (Note: Compare the lines of a frequently reproduced photograph of Fallingwater, copyrighted to the Western Pennsylvania Conservancy, with any of the versions of Envane's cover art.)

The opening track "Goz Quarter" contains Autechre's rare use of scratching as well a vocal sample taken from "No Awareness" on Dr. Octagonecologyst.

== Track listing ==
No.	Title	Length
1.	"Goz Quarter"	9:43
2.	"Latent Quarter"	7:37
3.	"Laughing Quarter"	7:05
4.	"Draun Quarter"	10:50
Total length:		35:17
