= Jega (musician) =

British electronic music artist

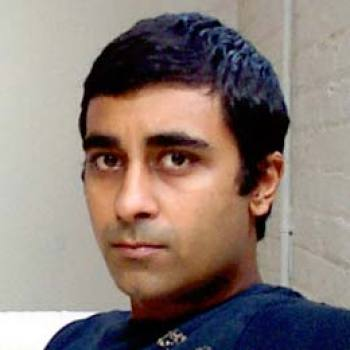

Background information
- Born: Dylan Nathan
- Origin: UK
- Genre: Electronic
- Occupation: Musician
- Years active: 1996–present
- Labels: Planet Mu; Skam Records; Matador Records
- Website: Official website

Jega is the recording name of the Manchester-based electronic music artist Dylan Nathan. Jega has released records on the Planet Mu, Matador and Skam record labels.

== Career ==
Jega released his first EP in 1996 in Manchester on Skam records. His first LP, Spectrum, was the first release on Mike Paradinas/μ-Ziq's Planet Mu label. Paradinas and Jega studied architecture together in London 1991–1994 on the same campus as Aphex Twin. Spectrum is a fusion of the breakbeat and intelligent dance music sound coming out of London at the time.

His second album, Geometry, reflects his electronic roots, avoiding samples and venturing more into synthesis.

Jega was named by Thom Yorke as an influence on Radiohead's 2000 album Kid A. Both Spectrum and Geometry were later licensed to Matador Records for release in North America, resulting in extensive tours of the United States. Despite only making six copies, in 2004 a demo of Variance was leaked to the Internet, resulting in him postponing the release. Variance was released on Planet Mu Records in 2009, as a double album comprising Variance volumes 1 and 2.

Jega toured with Autechre in 1997.

== Discography ==
EPs

- SKA006 (1996, Skam)
- SKA009 (1997, Skam)
- Type Xer0 (1998, Planet Mu)

Albums

- Spectrum (1998, Planet Mu) – #155 CMJ Radio Top 200, #12 CMJ RPM
- Geometry (2000, Planet Mu) – #15 CMJ RPM
- Variance (2009, Planet Mu)
- 1995 (2016, Skam Records)
