= Skam Records =

English independent record label

Skam
- Founded: 1990
- Founder: Andy Maddocks
- Genre: Electronic; Drum and bass Glitch; Illbient; IDM
- Country of origin: England
- Location: Manchester, England
- Official website: skam.bleepstores.com

Skam Records is an independent electronic music record label based in Manchester, England, founded by Andy Maddocks around 1990. Skam also runs a smaller sub-label called 33.

== History ==
Skam's first 12-inch single was Lego Feet by Lego Feet (Sean Booth and Rob Brown, later known as Autechre). The label followed with two 12" records from Gescom, a project whose members vary between each release. Other early Skam releases came from Freeform (Simon Pyke), Bola, Jega, Team Doyobi, Wevie Stonder, E.Stonji (Jens Döring), and Boards of Canada. Boards of Canada's Hi Scores EP, and Gescom's Keynell and Lego Feet have been re-pressed or reissued.

Skam's first full-length LP releases were in 1998 with Soup by Bola and Music Has the Right to Children by Boards of Canada, the latter being jointly released with Warp Records.

A recurring feature on the packaging of Skam releases is the title of the album printed in braille.

=== Series releases ===
Skam has released several series of record editions whose catalogue-series codes are anagrams of “SKAM” (for example “MASK”, “KMAS”, “SMAK”, “AMKS”).

The earliest “MASK” series was produced in collaboration with the German label Musik Aus Strom, and subsequent editions of the series were released by Skam alone.

Up until the 2004 release of Mr 76ix's Hits of 76ix, the label has produced a 7" single along with each full-length album; the 7" catalogue numbers begin with the letters "KMAS". Skam has since stated on its website that future KMAS releases will feature purely exclusive tracks to complement full-length recordings of the same number.

In 2001, Skam began the "SMAK" series. Each SMAK 12" showcased two artists, one per record side. Some SMAK artists, like Quinoline Yellow, have gone on to become full Skam musicians. NMB Allstars ("North Manchester Bedroom Allstars") went on to become part of the sublabel 33, which Skam has referred to as "a part of the family." Others, like Ola Bergman and Posthuman went on to set up their own record labels: New Speak and Seed Records, respectively. Made, are known for their live acts. In October 2004, Skam began the "AMKS" series with Supermechamaximegamegablast by Mortal and Chemist, which is, as the catalogue number may suggest, a mix.

== Reception ==
Tim Haslett wrote of Skam in the October 1997 issue of CMJ New Music Monthly:

"It looked for a while as though the minimalist electronic movement had simply disappeared into the valley of the self-indulgent and repetitive. The monotonous sound of a 909 kick drum and high-hat was really beginning to wear on the nerves of even the most committed techheads. Enter the Manchester-based Skam label, which has single-handedly invigorated a minimal techno sound that's not indebted to breakbeats or drum-and-bass. Having released early tracks by cult favorites Gescom and the Boards Of Canada, the Skam imprint has continued to thrive at the periphery of the crepuscular world of underground techno."

In the same magazine in March 1999, Haslett wrote that Skam:

"is notorious for its elusiveness, its tendency to make available only tiny quantities of each release. This might seem an elitist marketing move, an attempt to restrict the audience, but the Skam folks spend so much attention to detail in artwork and sound quality that it's easy to forgive them."

== Artists past and present ==
- Boards of Canada
- Bola (Darrell Fitton)
- Freeform (Simon Pyke)
- Gescom (includes Autechre, Darrell Fitton, Russell Haswell, Andy Maddocks)
- Jega
- Lego Feet (Autechre)
- Meat Beat Manifesto
- Mystery Artist (Don Funcken & Roel Funcken)
- Quinoline Yellow
- Posthuman
- Push Button Objects
- Team Doyobi
- VHS Head
- Wevie Stonder

== See also ==
- List of record labels
- List of independent UK record labels
