= Cichlisuite =

- Cichlisuite CD cover

EP by Autechre
- Released: 26 August 1997
- Recorded: 1997
- Genre: IDM
- Length: 29:32
- Label: Warp
- Producer: Autechre

Autechre chronology
Chiastic Slide (1997)	Cichlisuite (1997)	LP5 (1998)

Professional ratings
Review scores
Source	Rating
AllMusic	2.5/5 stars

Cichlisuite is the sixth EP by electronic music duo Autechre, released on August 26, 1997, by Warp. The EP was simultaneously released on CD and as two 12” records, all with unique cover art by The Designers Republic. Cichlisuite is Autechre's third release of 1997, following Chiastic Slide and the Envane EP.

The EP's title references the track "Cichli" (pronounced "sickly") from Chiastic Slide. According to Sean Booth, "a couple of tracks" on Cichlisuite were made entirely with the Nord Lead synthesizer.

== Track listing ==
All tracks are written by Sean Booth and Rob Brown.

No.	Title	Length
1.	"Yeesland"	6:22
2.	"Pencha"	6:14
3.	"Characi"	7:23
4.	"Krib"	3:11
5.	"Tilapia"	6:14
Total length:		29:32
