= Chiastic Slide =

Studio album by Autechre
- Released: 17 February 1997
- Genre: IDM; ambient; experimental
- Length: 69:48
- Label: Warp
- Producer: Autechre

Autechre chronology
Envane (1997)	Chiastic Slide (1997)	Cichlisuite (1997)

Chiastic Slide is the fourth studio album by the British electronic music group Autechre, released 17 February 1997 by Warp Records. The album saw the duo continue to move further away from the ambient techno sound of their early releases, employing harsher, glitchier beats. Though not initially met with the same critical acclaim as Tri Repetae or LP5, Chiastic Slide was eventually recognized by critics as an innovative and "enormously influential" album.

== Release ==
Chiastic Slide was released on 17 February 1997. It did not receive a release in the United States until Warp Records began distributing its own releases there in 2001. Autechre referenced the fourth track, "Cichli", in the name of their subsequent EP Cichlisuite (1997). The sleeve was designed by Sheffield-based design agency The Designers Republic. On 19 November 2021, Chiastic Slide was re-released by Warp on vinyl, alongside their next album LP5.

== Reception ==
Professional ratings
Review scores
Source	Rating
AllMusic	3/5 stars
Muzik	5/10
NME	4/10
Rolling Stone	3/5 stars

Allmusic critic John Bush panned Chiastic Slide as being an underwhelming follow-up to 1995's Tri Repetae, saying it was too repetitive and lacked ideas. Tim Barr in Techno: the Rough Guide called Chiastic Slide "The aural equivalent of being at the bottom of the sea." He went on to say the album was "Dark, claustrophobic... yet full of strange beauty". Writing in the NME, Kitty Empire compared the album negatively to its predecessors, saying that "while Autechre's metal machine music had always consisted of disembodied scrapes, foreboding whirrs and fidgety beats, there was always a safety net of warm electronic strings holding it all together. Now their circuitry seems to have taken over completely - and gone haywire to boot."

A 2017 FACT Magazine retrospective described Chiastic Slide as "an enduring classic" that marks "the axis point around which all of Autechre's work revolves," representing a "break from contemporaneous orthodoxy" in electronic music and sound composition. In an interview with Popular 1 Magazine, guitarist Kavus Torabi of Cardiacs named Chiastic Slide as one of his favourite albums.

== Track listing ==
No.	Title	Length
1.	"Cipater"	8:56
2.	"Rettic AC"	2:08
3.	"Tewe"	6:56
4.	"Cichli"	8:52
5.	"Hub"	7:35
6.	"Calbruc"	3:51
7.	"Recury"	9:44
8.	"Pule"	8:33
9.	"Nuane"	13:13
Total length:		69:48
