= EP7 =

EP by Autechre
- Released: 7 June 1999
- Genre: IDM, ambient, experimental
- Length: 69:59
- Label: Warp
- Producer: Autechre

Autechre chronology
Peel Session (1999)	EP7 (1999)	Splitrmx12 (1999)

EP7 is the seventh EP by the electronic music group Autechre, released by Warp Records on 7 June 1999. It is classified as an EP by the band despite being long enough to qualify as an album. The record was released in two parts on vinyl, named EP7.1 and EP7.2. According to the band, the artwork was drawn in Adobe Freehand.

== Reception ==
Professional ratings
Review scores
Source	Rating
Allmusic	4/5 stars
Pitchfork Media	(5.7/10)
Sputnik Music	(4.5/5)

EP7 received mixed to positive reviews. John Bush of AllMusic called it "an affecting (and effective) release -- not quite as futuristic or distinctive as LP5 but a bit more fun to listen to." Ryan Screiber of Pitchfork Media said the album's primary problem was a "lack of diversity" and that the tracks "[offer] very little in the way of originality".

== Track listing ==
The original UK CD pressing includes a hidden track in the pregap. The track, which can be accessed by rewinding from the beginning of "Rpeg", is 6:44 in duration and is followed by 3:01 of silence. Some CD players do not handle the trick, and may skip "Rpeg" because of it. The hidden track was not included on the US release nor on vinyl. The hidden track is included on Autechre's EPs 1991–2002 box set, with the CD version retaining the track's pregap placement. In 2010, Pitchfork Media included the EP7 hidden track in their list of "ten unusual CD-era gimmicks."

All tracks are written by Sean Booth and Rob Brown.

No.	Title	Length
0.	Untitled	9:45
1.	"Rpeg"	6:01
2.	"Ccec"	4:59
3.	"Squeller"	4:38
4.	"Left Blank"	6:40
5.	"Outpt"	7:12
6.	"Dropp"	3:16
7.	"Liccflii"	4:58
8.	"Maphive 6.1"	8:18
9.	"Zeiss Contarex"	6:33
10.	"Netlon Sentinel"	4:06
11.	"Pir"	3:32
Total length:		69:59
