= Darrell Fitton =

English electronic musician

- Also known as: Bola; Jello
- Born: Darrell Earnest Fitton
- Origin: Manchester, England
- Genres: Electronic; IDM; ambient; downtempo; techno
- Years active: 1994–present
- Label: Skam

Darrell Earnest Fitton is an English electronic musician from Rochdale, England. Most of his work is recorded under the monikers Bola and Jello, released primarily on Skam Records. Fitton has also contributed to electronic acts D-Breeze, Brahma and Ooblo, and Autechre's Gescom project. Fitton was rumoured to have left the music industry in November 2007, but in 2017 he released the album D.E.G.

== Career ==
Fitton loaned equipment to Autechre in their early days and his first noteworthy involvement with electronic music was as assistant on their debut album Incunabula. His own first electronic music release came in 1994, on Warp's Artificial Intelligence II compilation. In 1995 he returned with the now more familiar Bola moniker, releasing the 1 12" on Skam Records. In 1996, he recorded the album Plink with Dennis Bourne and Wayne Edwards as Brahma. However, Fitton left the band to pursue his career as Bola. He and Bourne would later collaborate again on the tracks "Mauver" and "Pae Paoe". The debut album as Bola, Soup, came in 1998 and was described by Vladimir Bogdanov in the All Music Guide to Electronica as "an impressive synthesis of the machine-beat ambiance (sic) of post-techno with warm, wistful analog soul". A set of three EPs called Shapes was released in 2000, limited to 300 copies; in September 2006, it was remastered and reissued in greater numbers by Skam, adding three bonus tracks.

On 2 January 2013, Fitton addressed the rumours of his retirement, stating "I figure 5 years of relative inactivity is an adequate musical absence. New music will be produced and released this year." Bola album, D.E.G.—short for Darrell Earnest is Gone—was issued in 2017. There have been occasional live performances, including one in December 2012 at Adapter's Vertigo IV in Eindhoven.

Albums released as Bola are generally titled in a way that forms a play on words with Bola, e.g. Soup (Bowl of Soup), Mauver (Bowl 'em over), Fyuti (Bowl of Yew Tea), Gnayse (Bolognaise), Kroungrine (Crown Green Bowler), D.E.G. (Boiled Egg).

== Style ==
Fitton's blend of electronica, jazz-influenced keyboard parts and ambient soundscapes has been described as "equally informed by the expansive emotions of electronica together with sensible melodies and cinematic atmospheres." "Bola travels in decidedly cinematic realms, crafting music that begs for emotional, tactile responses, ranging from sadness to fear to suspense," opined Tim DiGravina in a review of Fyuti for AllMusic. "All of this emotional manipulation is done through extended synth notes, pristine keyboards, and shimmering, otherworldly electronic elements."

While frequently described as "cinematic", Fitton's music has been noted as employing harsher, less accessible elements such as "austere synth textures and almost industrial-grade distortion". "Bola's work needs time to work its magic," states the Electronic Music Guide. "A patient listener will be hugely rewarded".

== Discography ==
=== Albums ===
- Bola – Soup (Skam, 1998)
  - Remastered and reissued with new artwork, 2003
- Bola – Fyuti (Skam, 2001)
- Jello – Voile (Peacefrog, 2002)
- Bola – Gnayse (Skam, 2004)
- Bola – Shapes (Skam, 2006) – remastered and re-issued version of the Shapes EP, plus 3 bonus tracks
- Bola – Kroungrine (Skam, 2007)
- Bola – D.E.G. (Skam, 2017)

=== Singles and EPs ===
- Bola – 1 (Skam, 1995) – 12"
- Bola – KS (Skam, 1998) – 7"
- Bola – Mauver (Skam, 2000) – 12"
- Bola – Shapes (Skam, 2000) – 12"; limited to 300 copies
  - Remastered and reissued, 2006
- Bola – Pae Paoe (Skam, 2001) – 7"
- Jello – Chamchimzee (Peacefrog, 2002) – 12"
- Jello – Lungbone (Peacefrog, 2003) – 12", CD

=== Remixes ===
- Lamb – Softly (Bola remix), 1999 (Fontana)
- Aqualung – Strange and Beautiful (I Put a Spell on You) (Cassan Vae), 2002 (B-Unique Records).
- Bass Communion – Macrovelux Deluxremux, 2003 (Headphone Dust)
- Martin L. Gore – Loverman (Bola remix), 2003 (Mute)
- Ektoise – Lmenitemix (Bola), 2010 (777 Operations)
