= Anti EP =

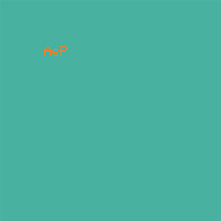

EP by Autechre
- Released: 3 September 1994
- Genre: IDM
- Length: 24:40
- Label: Warp
- Producer: Autechre

Autechre chronology
Basscadet Mixes (1994)	Anti EP (1994)	Amber (1994)

Anti EP is the second EP by British electronic music duo Autechre, released by Warp on 3 September 1994. It peaked at number 90 on the UK Singles Chart, as well as number 39 on the UK Dance Singles Chart. It is the only explicitly political record Autechre have released.

== Background ==
Anti EP was a protest against the Criminal Justice and Public Order Act 1994, which would prohibit raves (described as gatherings where music is played), with "music" being defined as a "succession of repetitive beats." Sean Booth explained the band's strategy for the song "Flutter" by saying, "We made as many different bars as we could on the drum machine, then strung them all together."

The packaging bore a sticker with a disclaimer about the repetitive nature of the rhythmic elements of "Lost" and "Djarum". "Flutter" was programmed to have non-repetitive beats and therefore "can be played at both forty five and thirty three revolutions under the proposed law"; but following their disclaimer, it was advised that DJs "have a lawyer and a musicologist present at all times to confirm the non repetitive nature of the music in the event of police harassment." The sticker acted as a seal, which was required to be broken in order to access the media enclosed in the packaging.

The profits from this release went to the political pressure group Liberty. The sticker ended with this last statement: "Autechre is politically non-aligned. This is about personal freedom."

Despite "Flutter"'s ability to be played at 33 1/3 RPM and 45 RPM on vinyl, the CD version contains the song as played at 45 RPM.

== Critical reception ==
Professional ratings
Review scores
Source	Rating
AllMusic	4/5 stars

Ken Tataki of AllMusic gave the EP 4 stars out of 5, saying, "Beyond a doubt, this is an excellent showcase not only for the band, but also for the label [Warp Records] that signed them." Writing for Fact in 2013, Maya Kalev called the EP "a continued reminder of dance music's extra-linguistic and innate potential for subversion." In 2014, Fact placed "Flutter" at number 1 on their list of the "100 greatest IDM tracks".

== Track listing ==
All tracks are written by Sean Booth and Rob Brown.

No.	Title	Length
1.	"Lost"	7:24
2.	"Djarum"	7:19
3.	"Flutter"	9:57
Total length:		24:40

== Charts ==
Chart	Peak position
UK Singles (OCC)	90
UK Dance Singles (OCC)	39
