= Minidisc (album) =

Studio album by Gescom
- Released: (MD) 27 July 1998 (CD) 13 November 2006
- Genres: Experimental, ambient, drone, acousmatic, electroacoustic, glitch
- Length: 67:06
- Label: Touch/Or ONLY 3

Gescom chronology
That (1998)	Minidisc (1998)	ISS:SA (2003)

Professional ratings
Review scores
Source	Rating
Allmusic	2.5/5 stars

Minidisc is the first album by Gescom. The album was originally only released in MiniDisc format, but was later pressed to CD. In addition, the album has been released on bleep.com. The personnel for this album were Sean Booth and Rob Brown (alias Autechre), and Russell Haswell (from Or Records).

== Overview ==
Minidisc was the world's first ever MiniDisc-only release and was designed to take advantage of the format's (then exclusive) zero seek time: Minidisc contains 45 pieces split into 88 tracks which are intended to be played in shuffle mode, creating a quasi-unique, aleatoric arrangement every time it is played, a technique also used for the compact disc releases Masque by the King Crimson-related ProjeKct Three and Apollo 18 by They Might Be Giants.

The tracks on this album reveal the influence of DSP techniques. Half of the album can be related to drone music or ambient music, the other half to acousmatic music or electroacoustic music.

The release was included in Pitchfork Media's 2010 list of "ten unusual CD-era gimmicks".

== Recreating the experience ==
Gescom wanted to make use of the seamless shuffle play unique to the MD format and created this sequence of 88 short tracks to be played in any order at random. Most CD players cannot do seamless random playback because there is always a slight delay between tracks. People listening to digital versions will get the full MD experience as most music players now have gapless playback even in shuffle mode.

== Track listing ==
The original MD album had an exact total of 67:06; later CD or MP3 versions may be one second off from the original durations.

1. "Cut Begin [1]" – 0:14
2. "Cut Begin [2]" – 0:10
3. "Cut Begin [3]" – 0:13
4. "Cut Begin [4]" – 0:08
5. "Cut Begin [5]" – 0:12
6. "Cut Begin [6]" – 0:16
7. "Cut Begin [7]" – 0:20
8. "Amendment 84" – 1:05
9. "Helix Shatterproof" – 1:06
10. "A Newer Beginning [1]" – 0:18
11. "A Newer Beginning [2]" – 1:09
12. "Polarized Beam Splitter [1]" – 0:37
13. "Polarized Beam Splitter [2]" – 0:09
14. "Polarized Beam Splitter [3]" – 0:43
15. "Polarized Beam Splitter [4]" – 1:19
16. "Polarized Beam Splitter [5]" – 0:22
17. "Inter" – 2:41
18. "RMI Corporate ID 1" – 0:09
19. "Pricks [1]" – 0:23
20. "Pricks [2]" – 3:56
21. "Pricks [3]" – 0:23
22. "Pricks [4]" – 0:06
23. "Devil" – 0:30
24. "Is We [1]" – 3:08
25. "Is We [2]" – 0:51
26. "Dan Dan Dan [1]" – 0:27
27. "Dan Dan Dan [2]" – 0:14
28. "Dan Dan Dan [3]" – 0:15
29. "Dan Dan Dan [4]" – 0:16
30. "Le Shark [1]" – 0:04
31. "Le Shark [2]" – 0:05
32. "Le Shark [3]" – 0:06
33. "Le Shark [4]" – 0:06
34. "Le Shark [5]" – 0:11
35. "Le Shark [6]" – 0:18
36. "Le Shark [7]" – 0:15
37. "1D Shapethrower" – 2:12
38. "Shoegazer" – 4:12
39. "Vermin [1]" – 0:14
40. "Vermin [2]" – 0:48
41. "Vermin [3]" – 0:14
42. "Hemiplegia 1" – 1:05
43. "Mcdcc" – 1:02
44. "Gortex" – 0:23
45. "Alf Sprey" – 0:13
46. "Interchangeable World [1]" – 0:09
47. "Interchangeable World [2]" – 0:33
48. "Interchangeable World [3]" – 1:17
49. "Cranusberg [1]" – 0:48
50. "Cranusberg [2]" – 4:15
51. "Cranusberg [3]" – 2:55
52. "Raindance" – 0:38
53. "Horse" – 0:04
54. "New Contact Lense" [sic] – 1:30
55. "Of Our Time" – 1:47
56. "Crepe [1]" – 0:04
57. "Crepe [2]" – 0:28
58. "Crepe [3]" – 0:04
59. "Crepe [4]" – 0:23
60. "Wab Wat" – 0:49
61. " 'MC" – 0:14
62. "Peel" – 1:03
63. "IGE" or "I G E" – 0:08
64. "Knutsford Services" – 0:57
65. "Fully [1]" – 2:24
66. "Fully [2]" – 1:46
67. "Squashed to Pureness [1]" – 0:09
68. "Squashed to Pureness [2]" – 0:15
69. "Squashed to Pureness [3]" – 0:10
70. "Squashed to Pureness [4]" – 0:49
71. "Yo! DMX Crew" – 2:47
72. "Go On" – 1:36
73. "Stroyer 2 [1]" – 0:20
74. "_ [1]" – 1:05
75. "_ [2]" – 0:09
76. "Shep" – 1:08
77. "Langue" – 0:08
78. "Poke [1]" – 0:10
79. "Poke [2]" – 0:15
80. "Poke [3]" – 0:31
81. "Poke [4]" – 0:14
82. "Hemiplegia 2" – 0:17
83. "Territory of Usage [1]" – 0:17
84. "Territory of Usage [2]" – 0:36
85. "Tomo [1]" – 0:15
86. "Tomo [2]" – 0:17
87. "RMI Corporate ID 2" – 0:07
88. "PT/AE" – 0:07
