= Cavity Job =

EP by Autechre
- Released: December 1991
- Recorded: 1991
- Genre: Electronica
- Length: 13:23
- Label: Hardcore Records; HARD003
- Producer: Sean Booth and Rob Brown

Autechre chronology
Lego Feet (1991)	Cavity Job (1991)	Incunabula (1993)

Cavity Job is the debut single by British electronic music duo Autechre. It was originally released as a 12" vinyl record on Hardcore Records in December 1991, with just over 1,000 copies pressed. It was included on CD for the first time in the EPs 1991–2002 compilation, released by Warp on 11 April 2011.

== Track listing ==
Cavity Job
No.	Title	Length
1.	"Cavity Job"	6:23
2.	"Accelera 1 & 2"	6:58
Total length:		13:23
