= Anvil Vapre =

EP by Autechre
- Released: 2 October 1995
- Genre: IDM, ambient techno
- Length: 35:43
- Label: Warp
- Producer: Autechre

Autechre chronology
Garbage (1995)	Anvil Vapre (1995)	Tri Repetae (1995)

Professional ratings
Review scores
Source	Rating
Allmusic	3/5 stars

Anvil Vapre is the fourth EP by British electronic music duo Autechre, released by Warp Records on 2 October 1995. It is a companion to their album Tri Repetae, being based on material from the same sessions, which were left out for space reasons. Unlike previous EPs, Anvil Vapre's tracks were split across two vinyl discs that were released separately. All four tracks are included on the CD pressing. Anvil Vapre was also released alongside Garbage as part of the US version of Tri Repetae.

The song names are inspired by scenery associated with Snake Pass; Bad Vilbel is a German spa town which is twinned with Glossop. A promotional video for "Second Bad Vilbel" was created by Chris Cunningham. A re-edited version of the video can be found on Warp Records' 2004 DVD compilation WarpVision, as well as on the Gantz Graf DVD EP.

Of note is that the names of "Second Scepe" and "Second Scout" are flipped on the vinyl release. Whether this was accidental or a deliberate choice is unknown.

"Second Scepe" is featured in the soundtrack of the video games Sleeping Dogs and Hardwar; Hardwar also featured “Second Bad Vilbel”, as well as “Clipper” (from Tri Repetae).

== Track listing ==
Anvil Vapre CD (WAP64CD)
No.	Title	Length
1.	"Second Bad Vilbel"	9:45
2.	"Second Scepe"	7:44
3.	"Second Scout"	7:21
4.	"Second Peng"	10:53
Total length:		35:43

Anvil Vapre 12" 1 (WAP64)
No.	Title	Length
1.	"Second Bad Vilbel"	9:45
2.	"Second Peng"	10:53
Total length:		20:38

Anvil Vapre 12" 2 (WAP64R)
No.	Title	Length
1.	"Second Scepe"	7:21
2.	"Second Scout"	7:44
Total length:		15:05
