= Incunabula (album) =

1993 studio album by Autechre

Studio album by Autechre
- Released: 29 November 1993
- Genre: Techno; ambient techno; IDM
- Length: 77:50
- Label: Warp
- Producer: Sean Booth; Rob Brown

Autechre chronology
Cavity Job (1991)	Incunabula (1993)	Basscadet Mixes (1994)

Artificial Intelligence series chronology
Ginger (1993)	Incunabula (1993)	Artificial Intelligence II (1994)

Incunabula is the debut album by the English electronic music duo Autechre. It was released by Warp on 29 November 1993, and by Wax Trax! in the United States on 25 January 1994.

Autechre member Rob Brown later described the album as "more of a compilation of old material". Critics have generally noted that it is more melodic and less formally experimental than Autechre's later work.

Incunabula reached number 3 on the UK Independent Albums Chart in December 1993. Warp reissued it on vinyl in 2016. In 2012, Fact ranked it 11th on its list of the best albums of the 1990s.

== Music and production ==
Autechre member Rob Brown described Incunabula as "more of a compilation of old material", and said that he regarded the follow-up album Amber as "the first album we put out on Warp." Reviewers and music writers have described the album in terms of techno, ambient techno and IDM. "Eggshell" is a rework of "The Egg", a track Autechre had contributed to Warp's Artificial Intelligence compilation.

Critics have often contrasted the album with Autechre's later releases. Ned Raggett of AllMusic wrote that the album did not yet show the degree of experimentation that would characterise the duo's later work, but said it remained a strong early-1990s UK techno album. David Stubbs of The Wire similarly wrote that Incunabula and Amber were closer to the work of Autechre's Warp contemporaries than the duo's later, more abstract records.

Raggett described the album as built around minimal beats, bass, keyboard textures and understated melodies, with "Basscadet" combining club-oriented rhythms with more avant-garde elements. In a 2016 review, Pitchfork critic Andy Beta wrote that "Bike" showed Autechre at their most song-like, while "Basscadet" anticipated the harsher electronic textures of their later work.

== Release ==
Incunabula was released by Warp on 29 November 1993. It entered the UK Independent Albums Chart at number 3 on 18 December 1993. It was released in the United States by Wax Trax! on 25 January 1994.

Warp reissued Incunabula, Amber and Tri Repetae on vinyl on 11 November 2016. The album entered the UK Dance Albums Chart at number 21 for the chart week dated 2 January 2026.

== Reception ==
Professional ratings
Review scores
Source	Rating
AllMusic	4.5/5 stars
Encyclopedia of Popular Music	4/5 stars
Pitchfork	8.2/10
Record Collector	4/5 stars
The Rolling Stone Album Guide	2.5/5 stars
Select	4/5

In a contemporaneous review, Daniel Durchholz of the St. Louis Post-Dispatch placed Autechre alongside ambient techno acts such as The Orb, Ultramarine and Aphex Twin. He wrote that the album avoided the monotony sometimes associated with techno and described it as music suited to introspection.

Retrospective reviews have generally treated Incunabula as a strong but transitional early Autechre release. Raggett, writing for AllMusic, said that the album lacked the full experimentation of the duo's later work but still stood above many UK techno albums from the early 1990s. David Stubbs of The Wire described Incunabula and Amber as accomplished home-produced techno records, though less radical than Autechre's later music. The New Rolling Stone Album Guide was less favourable, describing both albums as "smart if unexciting ambient watercolors".

Reviewing the 2016 vinyl reissues for Pitchfork, Andy Beta praised "Bike" and "Basscadet", while criticising the album's length. Fact ranked Incunabula 11th on its 2012 list of the best albums of the 1990s.

== Track listing ==
All tracks are written by Sean Booth and Rob Brown

No.	Title	Length
1.	"Kalpol Introl"	3:18
2.	"Bike"	7:57
3.	"Autriche"	6:53
4.	"Bronchus 2"	3:33
5.	"Basscadet"	5:23
6.	"Eggshell"	9:01
7.	"Doctrine"	7:48
8.	"Maetl"	6:32
9.	"Windwind"	11:15
10.	"Lowride"	7:15
11.	"444"	8:55
Total length:		77:50

== Personnel ==
Credits adapted from the Incunabula record sleeve.

- Sean Booth – writer, producer
- Rob Brown – writer, producer
- Adrian Harrow – assistance
- Richard Brown – assistance
- Darrell Fitton – assistance
- Geoff Pesche – mastering
- The Designers Republic – design
- Daniel 72 – original images

== Charts ==
Chart performance for Incunabula
Chart	Peak position
UK Independent Albums (Music Week)	3
UK Dance Albums (OCC)	21

== See also ==
- 1993 in music
- Music of the United Kingdom (1990s)
- List of 1990s albums considered the best
