= Beaumont Hannant =

British musician, producer and DJ

- Born: c. 1970 (age 55–56); York, England
- Genres: Ambient techno, IDM, Trip hop, Hip hop, Indie rock
- Occupations: Musician, producer, DJ, talent manager
- Instruments: Turntables, synthesizers
- Years active: 1986–1998
- Labels: General Production Recordings One Little Indian
- Member of: Outcast

Beaumont Hannant (born c. 1970) is a British musician, producer and DJ from York, England. His work includes ambient techno, IDM, hip hop and indie rock. Hannant has received positive critical reviews, and he was named one of "The Faces of '94" by music magazine Select.

== Biography ==
Hannant became a hip-hop/electro DJ in 1986, after witnessing the 1986 World Mixing Championships. During 1993–1994, he released several solo albums on General Production Recordings rooted in ambient techno. His music from this period has been described as eclectic, densely layered and textured.

Hannant's album Texturology (1994) resulted in a top three independent album chart placing. Music from the album was used in a theatre presentation of the 17th-century play The Traitor.

By 1994, Hannant began to diversify. He provided remixes for Autechre, Björk and Ned's Atomic Dustbin, produced Lida Husik (who provided the vocals to some of his compositions) and managed Shed Seven. With his long-term engineer Richard Brown, Hannant started the trip hop duo Outcast, signing to the indie label One Little Indian in 1996.

== Discography ==
Releases

All on General Production Recordings

- 1993: Tastes and Textures, Vol. 1 (EP)
- 1993: Tastes and Textures, Vol. 2: Basic Data Manipulation (CD and double LP)
- 1994: Tastes and Textures, Vol. 3 (EP)
- 1994: Texturology (CD and double LP)
- 1994: Texturology [Vol. 2] (limited additional double LP)
- 1994: Ormeau (single)
- 1994: Sculptured (CD and double LP)
- 1994: Bitter Sweet (recorded as YO3 alias)
- 1995: Psi-Onyx (EP)
- 1995: Notions of Tonality, Vol. 1 (EP)
- 1996: Notions of Tonality, Vol. 2 (EP)

The cover of Notions of Tonality, Vol. 2 mentions a forthcoming album, Tones, but General Production Recordings folded before it could be released, and the album never surfaced.

Appearances include

- 1994: "Utuba" on Artificial Intelligence II
- 1996: Green Blue Fire album by Husikesque

Remixes include

- 1994: "Beaumonthannanttwomx" and "12/4cadetmx" on Basscadet EP by Autechre
- 1995: Two remixes of "All I Ask of Myself Is That I Hold Together" and two remixes of "Premonition" by Ned's Atomic Dustbin
- 1995: Three remixes of "Hyperballad" by Björk: "Girls Blouse Mix", "Over the Edge Mix" and "Subtle Abuse Mix"
