= The Orb discography =

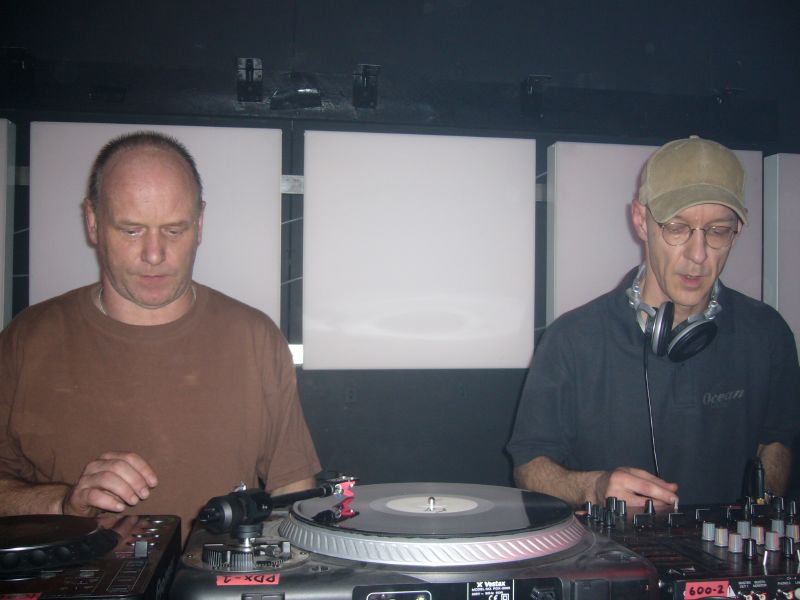
- The Orb performing at Culture Box in Copenhagen in 2005
- Studio albums: 19
- Extended plays: 10
- Live albums: 1
- Compilation albums: 8
- Singles: 34
- Video albums: 2
- Music videos: 22
- Remix albums: 4
- Mix albums: 4

The discography of European electronic music group the Orb includes eighteen studio albums, one live album, eight compilation albums, four remix albums, four mix albums, two video albums, ten extended plays, thirty-four singles and twenty-two music videos. Founded by Alex Paterson and Jimmy Cauty in 1988, the group's first release was the extended play Kiss EP, issued in May 1989. The single "A Huge Ever Growing Pulsating Brain That Rules from the Centre of the Ultraworld", which marked the group's first foray into the ambient house genre, was released in October 1989 on Adam Morris and Martin Glover's record label WAU! Mr. Modo Recordings. It was later re-issued by Big Life and peaked at number 78 in the United Kingdom despite sample clearance issues. Following Cauty's departure from the group, the Orb signed a long-term recording contract with Big Life and released their debut studio album The Orb's Adventures Beyond the Ultraworld in April 1991. It peaked at number 29 in the United Kingdom and has since been recognized as a seminal album of the ambient house genre. "Little Fluffy Clouds" and "Perpetual Dawn" were released as singles from the album.

The Orb's second studio album U.F.Orb was released in June 1992 and topped the United Kingdom albums chart. The album's second single "Blue Room" – at a length of 39 minutes and 57 seconds – became the longest-running release to enter the UK Singles Chart, where it peaked at number eight. Following the success of U.F.Orb, the group signed to Island Records and released the live album Live 93 on the label. "Little Fluffy Clouds" and "Perpetual Dawn" were re-issued and became top 20 hits in the UK. The Orb's third studio album Orbus Terrarum was released in April 1995, charting at number twenty in the UK and producing the single "Oxbow Lakes". Orblivion followed in February 1997 and peaked at number nineteen in the United Kingdom; it also became the group's first album to chart in the United States, peaking at number 174 on the Billboard 200 chart. "Toxygene" became their first UK top five single and also charted at number 23 in Ireland.

The Orb's fifth studio album Cydonia was released in February 2001 following several delays, peaking at number 83 in the United Kingdom. The group subsequently left Island Records and released several albums on assorted labels: Bicycles & Tricycles (2004) on Cooking Vinyl, Okie Dokie It's The Orb on Kompakt (2005) on Kompakt, The Dream (2007) on Liquid Sound Design and Baghdad Batteries (Orbsessions Volume III) (2010) on Malicious Damage. Metallic Spheres, a collaboration with former Pink Floyd musician David Gilmour, was released in October 2010. It gave the group their highest-charting album in the UK since U.F.Orb, peaking at number twelve on the country's albums chart. Metallic Spheres also charted in several European countries, including Belgium, Greece and Ireland. The Orb then collaborated with Jamaican reggae musician Lee "Scratch" Perry on the albums The Orbserver in the Star House (2012) and More Tales from the Orbservatory (2013). More recently, the Orb have returned to their ambient roots, collaborating with Roger Eno and other musicians to produce Moonbuilding 2703 AD in 2015, COW / Chill Out, World! in 2016 and No Sounds Are Out of Bounds in 2018.

== Albums ==
=== Studio albums ===
List of studio albums, with selected chart positions
Title	Album details	Peak chart positions									
Title	Album details	UK	UK Dance	BEL	GER	GRC	IRL	NLD	US	US Dance	US Rock
The Orb's Adventures Beyond the Ultraworld	Released: 2 April 1991 (UK); Label: Big Life, Mercury; Formats: CD, cassette, LP	29	—	—	—	—	—	—	—	—	—
U.F.Orb	Released: 6 July 1992; Label: Big Life, Mercury; Formats: CD, cassette, LP	1	—	—	—	—	—	—	—	—	—
Pomme Fritz	Released: 13 June 1994 (UK); Label: Island; Formats: CD, cassette, 12"	6	—	—	—	—	—	—	—	—	—
Orbus Terrarum	Released: 4 April 1995 (UK); Label: Island; Formats: CD, cassette, LP	20	—	—	—	—	—	—	—	—	—
Orblivion	Released: 24 February 1997 (UK); Label: Island; Formats: CD, LP	19	—	—	—	—	—	—	174	—	—
Cydonia	Released: 26 February 2001 (UK); Label: Island, MCA; Formats: CD, LP, digital download	83	—	—	—	—	—	—	—	—	—
Bicycles & Tricycles	Released: 3 May 2004 (UK); Label: Cooking Vinyl; Formats: CD, LP, digital download	107	—	—	—	—	—	—	—	22	—
Okie Dokie It's The Orb on Kompakt	Released: 26 October 2005 (JPN); Label: Kompakt; Formats: CD, LP, digital download	—	—	—	—	—	—	—	—	—	—
The Dream	Released: 19 September 2007 (JPN); Label: Liquid Sound Design, Six Degrees, Traffic; Formats: CD, digital download	175	—	—	—	—	—	—	—	—	—
Baghdad Batteries (Orbsessions Volume III)	Released: 7 September 2009 (UK); Label: Malicious Damage; Formats: CD, LP, digital download	—	—	—	—	—	—	—	—	—	—
Metallic Spheres (featuring David Gilmour)	Released: 11 October 2010 (UK); Label: Columbia; Formats: CD, LP, digital download	12	3	34	95	21	65	40	73	3	23
The Orbserver in the Star House (featuring Lee "Scratch" Perry)	Released: 28 August 2012 (UK); Label: Cooking Vinyl; Formats: CD, LP, digital download	93	—	134	—	—	—	—	—	23	—
More Tales from the Orbservatory (featuring Lee "Scratch" Perry)	Released: 3 June 2013 (UK); Label: Cooking Vinyl, The End; Formats: CD, LP, digital download	191	—	—	—	—	—	—	—	—	—
Moonbuilding 2703 AD	Released: 22 June 2015; Label: Kompakt; Formats: CD, LP, digital download	90	19	158	—	—	—	84	—	—	—
COW / Chill Out, World!	Released: 14 October 2016; Label: Kompakt; Formats: CD, LP, digital download	—	9	116	—	—	—	—	—	—	—
No Sounds Are Out of Bounds	Released: 22 June 2018; Label: Cooking Vinyl; Formats: CD, LP, digital download	51	4	—	—	—	—	—	—	—	—
Abolition of the Royal Familia	Released: 27 March 2020; Label: Cooking Vinyl; Formats: CD, LP, digital download	62	2	99	—	—	—	—	—	—	—
Prism	Released: 28 April 2023; Label: Cooking Vinyl; Formats: CD, LP, digital download	85	1	—	—	—	—	—	—	—	—
Buddhist Hipsters	Released: 10 October 2025; Label: Cooking Vinyl; Formats: CD, LP, digital download	77	1	—	—	—	—	—	—	—	—

=== Live albums ===
List of live albums, with selected chart positions and certifications
Title	Album details	Peak chart positions	Certifications
Title	Album details	UK	Certifications
Live 93	Released: 22 November 1993 (UK); Label: Island; Formats: CD, cassette, LP	23	BPI: Silver
Further Adventures Beyond Dark Matter	Released: 2 September 2014 (UK); Label: Abbey Road Studios; Formats: CD, DVD, MP3	—	
The Orb's Further Adventures	Released: 21 February 2016 (UK); Label: Live Here Now; Formats: CD, DVD, LP, audio and video downloads	—	

=== Compilation albums ===
List of compilation albums, with selected chart positions
Title	Album details	Peak chart positions
Title	Album details	UK
U.F.Off: The Best of The Orb	Released: 2 October 1998 (UK); Label: Island; Formats: CD, LP	38
Orbsessions Volume One	Released: 18 October 2005 (UK); Label: Malicious Damage; Formats: CD, LP	—
Orbsessions Volume Two	Released: 4 June 2007 (UK); Label: Malicious Damage; Formats: CD, LP	—
The BBC Sessions 1989–2001	Released: 10 September 2008 (UK); Label: Island; Formats: CD	—
Impossible Oddities from Underground to Overground: The Story of Wau! Mr. Modo (with Youth)	Released: 25 October 2010 (UK); Label: Year Zero; Formats: CD, LP	—
History of the Future	Released: 7 October 2013 (UK); Label: Island; Formats: CD/DVD	190
History of the Future Part 2	Released: 16 February 2016 (UK); Label: Malicious Damage; Formats: CD/DVD	—
Orboretum: The Orb Collection	Released: 8 November 2024; Label: Cooking Vinyl; Formats: CD	—
"—" denotes a recording that did not chart or was not released in that territory.

=== Remix albums ===
List of remix albums
Title	Album details
Aubrey Mixes: The Ultraworld Excursions	Released: 27 December 1991 (UK); Released and deleted on the same day; Label: Big Life; Formats: LP, CD, cassette
Auntie Aubrey's Excursions Beyond the Call of Duty	Released: 13 August 1996 (UK); Label: Deviant; Formats: CD, cassette, LP
Auntie Aubrey's Excursions Beyond the Call of Duty Part 2	Released: 4 September 2001 (UK); Label: Deviant; Formats: CD
Orbserving the Star House in Dub (featuring Lee "Scratch" Perry)	Released: 13 May 2013 (UK); Label: Cooking Vinyl; Formats: CD, digital download
Auntie Aubrey's Excursions Beyond The Call of Duty pt.3: The Orb Remix Project	Released: 4 December 2020 (UK); Label: Liquid Sound Design; Formats: CD, digital download

=== Mix albums ===
List of mix albums
Title	Album details
Back to Mine	Released: 27 January 2003 (UK); Label: DMC; Formats: CD, LP
I'll Be Black	Released: 15 October 2007 (UK); Label: Trojan; Formats: CD
Tundra and Sunflakes Vol. 1	Released: 20 May 2011 (UK); Label: Ketama; Formats: CD, digital download
Tundra and Sunflakes Vol. 2	Released: 9 September 2011 (UK); Label: Ketama; Formats: CD, digital download

=== Video albums ===
List of video albums
Title	Album details
The Orb's Adventures Beyond the Ultraworld: Patterns and Textures	Released: 1992 (UK); Label: Big Life; Formats: VHS
C Batter C	Released: 11 November 2011 (UK); Label: Malicious Damage; Formats: DVD

== Extended plays ==
List of extended plays, with selected chart positions
Title	EP details	Peak chart positions
Title	EP details	UK
Kiss EP	Released: May 1989 (UK); Label: WAU! Mr. Modo; Formats: 12"	—
In Dub	Released: 1991 (UK); Label: Big Life; Formats: 12"	—
Peel Sessions	Released: 1 July 1991 (UK); Label: Strange Fruit; Formats: CD, cassette, LP	—
The Peel Sessions	Released: 28 March 1996 (UK); Label: Strange Fruit; Formats: CD, LP	—
Daleth of Elphame	Released: 22 July 2002 (UK); Label: Badorb.com; Formats: CD, 12"	—
Kompassion	Released: 6 January 2003 (UK); Label: Kompakt; Formats: 12"	—
Komplott	Released: 15 November 2004 (UK); Label: Kompakt; Formats: 12"	—
Battersea Shield (with Meat Beat Manifesto)	Released: 22 November 2004 (UK); Label: Malicious Damage; Formats: CD	—
Komfort	Released: 7 June 2005 (UK); Label: Kompakt; Formats: 12"	—
Alpine	Released: 4 March 2016 (UK); Label: Kompakt; Formats: 12"	—
"—" denotes a recording that did not chart or was not released in that territory.

== Singles ==
List of singles, with selected chart positions, showing year released and album name
Title	Year	Peak chart positions						Album
Title	Year	UK	IRL	UK Dance	UK Ind.	UK Phys.	US Dance	Album
"A Huge Ever Growing Pulsating Brain That Rules from the Centre of the Ultraworld"	1989	78	—	—	—	—	—	The Orb's Adventures Beyond the Ultraworld
"Little Fluffy Clouds"	1990	10	17	—	—	—	13	The Orb's Adventures Beyond the Ultraworld
"Perpetual Dawn"	1991	18	16	—	—	—	13	The Orb's Adventures Beyond the Ultraworld
"Blue Room"	1992	8	28	—	—	—	46	U.F.Orb
"Assassin"	1992	12	—	—	—	—	—	Non-album single
"Oxbow Lakes"	1995	38	—	10	—	38	—	Orbus Terrarum
"Toxygene"	1997	4	23	9	—	4	—	Orblivion
"Asylum"	1997	20	—	20	—	20	—	Orblivion
"Once More"	2001	38	50	9	—	38	—	Cydonia
"Aftermath" (featuring MC Soom-T)	2004	103	—	8	33	—	—	Bicycles & Tricycles
"Vuja De"	2007	—	—	—	—	—	—	The Dream
"DDD (Dirty Disco Dub)"	2009	—	—	—	—	—	—	The Dream
"Golden Clouds" (featuring Lee "Scratch" Perry)	2012	—	—	—	—	9	—	The Orbserver in the Star House
"Soulman" (featuring Lee "Scratch" Perry)	2012	—	—	—	—	44	—	The Orbserver in the Star House
"Ball of Fire" (featuring Lee "Scratch" Perry)	2013	—	—	—	—	34	—	The Orbserver in the Star House
"Doughnuts Forever" (featuring Jah Wobble)	2018	—	—	—	—	—	—	No Sounds Are Out of Bounds
"Rush Hill Road" (featuring Hollie Cook)	2018	—	—	—	—	—	—	No Sounds Are Out of Bounds
"Wolfbane"	2018	—	—	—	—	—	—	No Sounds Are Out of Bounds
"Pervitin (Empire Culling & The Hemlock Stone Version)"	2019	—	—	—	—	—	—	Abolition of the Royal Familia
"Hawk Kings (Oseberg Buddhas Buttonhole)"	2019	—	—	—	—	—	—	Abolition of the Royal Familia
"Daze (Missing & Messed Up Mix)"	2020	—	—	—	—	—	—	Abolition of the Royal Familia
"Toi 1338b" (with Sedibus)	2021	—	—	—	—	—	—	The Heavens
"Afterlife Aftershave" (with Sedibus)	2021	—	—	—	—	—	—	The Heavens
"Whippersnapper" (with OSS)	2021	—	—	—	—	—	—	Enter the Kettle
"Disco Bombing" (with OSS)	2021	—	—	—	—	—	—	Enter the Kettle
"Wow Picasso!" (with OSS)	2021	—	—	—	—	—	—	Enter the Kettle
"No Speed Limit" (with OSS)	2021	—	—	—	—	—	—	Enter the Kettle
"Living in Recycled Times" (solo or featuring Rachel D'Arcy)	2023	—	—	—	—	—	—	Prism
"Prism"	2023	—	—	—	—	—	—	Prism
"Cracking Kraken" (with Chocolate Hills)	2023	—	—	—	—	—	—	Yarns From the Chocolate Triangle
"H.O.M.E (High Orbs Mini Earth)"	2023	—	—	—	—	—	—	Prism
"Masterblaster" (edit)	2025	—	—	—	—	—	—	Speicher 14
"Arabebonics"	2025	—	—	—	—	—	—	Buddhist Hipsters
"Under the Bed"	2025	—	—	—	—	—	—	Buddhist Hipsters
"It's Coming Soon"	2025	—	—	—	—	—	—	Buddhist Hipsters
"—" denotes a recording that did not chart or was not released in that territory.

== Remix work ==
List of remixes produced by the Orb for other artists, showing year released and album name
Title	Year	Other artist(s)	Album
"Money $" (Orb Clubmix)	1989	Fischerman's Friend	"Money $" single
"Lily Was Here" (Space Centre Medical Unit Hum)	1989	David A. Stewart, Candy Dulfer	"Lily Was Here" single
"Hotel California" (Orb in Cali Mix 1)	1990	Jam on the Mutha	"Hotel California" single
"Hotel California" (Orbitally Ambient Mix)	1990	Jam on the Mutha	"Hotel California" single
"Sirtaki on Mars" (The Orb vs. High Frequency Bandwidth Remix)	2011	OMFO	"Sirtaki on Mars" single

1991

- Pato Banton - "Beams of Light"
- Big Audio Dynamite II - "The Globe"
- Fortran 5 - "Groove"
- Front 242 - "Rhythm of Time"
- Love Kittens - "What Goes On?"
- Primal Scream - "Higher Than the Sun"
- Sun Electric - "Red Summer"
- Suzuki K1 >> 7.5cc - "Satellite Serenade"
- System 7 - "Miracle"
- System 7 - "Sunburst"
- Time Unlimited - "Men of Wadodem"
- Wendy & Lisa - "Staring at the Sun"
- Wir - "So and Slow It Grows"
- Zodiac Youth - "Fast Forward the Future"

1992

- Blue Pearl - "Mother Dawn"
- Mystic Knights - "Ragga-nam-poiser"
- Mike Oldfield - "Sentinel"
- Lisa Stansfield - "Time to Make You Mine"
- System 7 - "Altitude"
- Yellow Magic Orchestra - "Tong Poo"

1993

- Electrot'ete - "I Love You"
- Front 242 - "Crapage"
- The Grid - "Crystal Clear"
- Haruomi Hosono - "Laughter Meditation"
- Material - "Mantra"
- Maurizio - "Ploy"
- U2 - "Numb" (unreleased)
- Yellow Magic Orchestra - "Technodon Remixes II"

1994

- Saxophonettes - "Secret Squirrel"

1995

- Innersphere - "Out of Body"
- Pop Will Eat Itself - "Home"
- Spectre - "Spectre Overseas"
- Yello - "You Gotta Say Yes to Another Excess"

1996

- The Cranberries - "Zombie"
- Gut/Lane - "Firething"
- Killing Joke - "Democracy"
- Penguin Cafe Orchestra - "Music for Found Harmonium"
- Prong - Rude Awakening
- Rick Wright - "Runaway"

1997

- Audioweb - "Faker"
- Can - "Halleluwah"
- Dolls Head - "It's Over, It's Under"
- Gong - "A PHP's Advice"
- Meat Beat Manifesto - "Radio Babylon"
- Nine Inch Nails - "The Perfect Drug"
- Tangerine Dream - "Towards The Evening Star"
- Tubeway Army - "Jo the Waiter"

1998

- Anaesthesia - "Dirty Kiss"
- Mindless Drug Hoover - "The Reefer Song"

1999

- D-Kiku - "Primitive..."
- One True Parker - "Singing Ringing Tune"

2000

- The Damage Manual - "Sunset Gun"
- Ayumi Hamasaki - "Monochrome"
- Denez Prigent - "Heart of Black Hole"
- Semisonic - "Secret Smile"

2001

- Another Fine Day - "Scarborough Fair"
- Electric Chairs - "Barbie Girl"
- Electrical Lovers - "Nijyu Rasen"
- Ayumi Hamasaki - "End of the World"
- Keith Hudson - "I'm Alright..."
- Suns of Arqa - "Children of Jumma"
- Witchman - "Angel Art"
- Yasuaki Shimizu - "Morocco Mole"

2002

- Creature - "Stuffed Hostage"
- Indochine - "Mao Boy"
- Serge Gainsbourg - "Requiem Pour Un C..."

2003

- Mika Nakashima - "Find the Way"

2004

- Ulf Lohmann - "Because Before"
- Hybrid - "Higher Than a Skyscraper"

2005

- Headcount - "Die Monkey Die"

2008

- Infadels - "Circus of the Mad"
- Louis Armstrong - "What a Wonderful World"
- Transit Kings - "The Last Lighthouse Keepers"

2009

- Transmission - "Dance Alone"

2010

- Coldcut & Hexstatic - "Timber"

2011

- Shrubbn! - Echos

2018

- Space - Magic Fly

== Music videos ==
List of music videos, showing year released and director
title	Year	Director(s)
"Little Fluffy Clouds"	1992	Simon Maxwell, Marion Waldorf
"Earth (Gaia)"	1992	Simon Maxwell, Marion Waldorf
"Towers of Dub"	1992	Simon Maxwell, Marion Waldorf
"Perpetual Dawn"	1992	Simon Maxwell, Marion Waldorf
"Star 6 & 7 8 9"	1992	Simon Maxwell, Marion Waldorf
"Outlands"	1992	Simon Maxwell, Marion Waldorf
"Outro"	1992	Simon Maxwell, Marion Waldorf
"Blue Room"	1992	Simon Maxwell, Marion Waldorf
"Assassin"	1992	Simon Maxwell, Marion Waldorf
"Pomme Fritz (Meat 'N Veg)"	1994	Tony Hill
"Oxbow Lakes"	1995	Ian Bryers, Mike Lipscombe
"Toxygene"	1997	Benjamin Stokes
"Asylum"	1997	Benjamin Stokes
"Once More"	2001	Vito Rocco
"From a Distance (Blast Master v. The Corpral)" (featuring The Corpral)	2004	Ukawa Naohiro
"Vuja De" (version 1)	2007	Katsura Moshino
"Vuja De" (version 2)	2007	Katsura Moshino
"Hymns to the Sun" (version 1) (featuring David Gilmour)	2010	Gavin Elder
"Hymns to the Sun" (version 2) (featuring David Gilmour)	2010	Stylorouge
"Hold Me Upsetter" (featuring Lee "Scratch" Perry)	2012	—N/a
"Golden Clouds" (featuring Lee "Scratch" Perry)	2012	Volker Schaner
"Soulman" (featuring Lee "Scratch" Perry)	2012	Volker Schaner
