= Orboretum: The Orb Collection =

Compilation album by the Orb
- Released: 8 November 2024
- Length: 154:00
- Label: Cooking Vinyl
- Producer: The Orb

The Orb chronology
Prism (2023)	Orboretum: The Orb Collection (2024)	Buddhist Hipsters (2025)

Orboretum: The Orb Collection is the fourth compilation album by the Orb released on 8 November 2024 on Cooking Vinyl.

In Alex Paterson's words, the compilation is "a sort of director's cut, reframing our output, making new neuro pathways, and new juxtapositions."

== Track listing ==
Orboretum: The Orb Collection disc one track listing
No.	Title	Original release	Length
1.	"A Huge Ever Growing Pulsating Brain That Rules from the Centre of the Ultraworld" (Orbital Dance Mix)	The Orb's Adventures Beyond the Ultraworld (1991)	8:11
2.	"Little Fluffy Clouds" (Ambient Mix 1)	The Orb's Adventures Beyond the Ultraworld (1991)	4:28
3.	"Perpetual Dawn" (2024 version)	The Orb's Adventures Beyond the Ultraworld (1991)	3:50
4.	"Pomme Fritz (Meat 'N Veg)"	Pomme Fritz (1994)	8:59
5.	"Blue Room" (radio 7")	U.F.Orb (1992)	4:04
6.	"Oxbow Lakes" (Sabres No. 1 Mix)	Orbus Terrarum (1995)	7:21
7.	"Toxygene"	Orblivion (1997)	5:19
8.	"Asylum" (7" edit)	Orblivion (1997)	3:57
9.	"Once More" (Scourge of the Earth Long Mix)	Cydonia (2001)	4:53
10.	"Ghostdancing" (version)	Cydonia (2001)	6:45
11.	"Gee Strings"	Bicycles & Tricycles (2004)	5:13
12.	"Aftermath" (LP version)	Bicycles & Tricycles (2004)	4:40
13.	"From a Distance (Blast Master v The Corpral)"	Bicycles & Tricycles (2004)	3:55
14.	"Dilmun"	Bicycles & Tricycles (2004)	3:59

Orboretum: The Orb Collection disc two track listing
No.	Title	Original release	Length
1.	"Lunik" (Komplott EP version)	Komplott EP (2004)	5:24
2.	"Captain Korma"	Okie Dokie It's The Orb on Kompakt (2005)	5:18
3.	"Appletree in My Back Yard" (Abakus Remix)	Tsunami Benefit compilation (2005)	8:47
4.	"DDD (Dirty Disco Dub)" (Belka & Strelka Remix)	The Dream (2007)	5:05
5.	"Metallic Spheres in Colour – Round Side" (2024 edit; with David Gilmour)	Metallic Spheres (2010)	8:19
6.	"Golden Clouds" (featuring Lee "Scratch" Perry)	The Orbserver in the Star House (2012)	5:45
7.	"Fussball" (featuring Lee "Scratch" Perry)	More Tales from the Orbservatory (2013)	4:31
8.	"Pillow Fight @ Shag Mountain" (radio edit)	No Sounds Are Out of Bounds (2018)	3:43
9.	"Rush Hill Road" (radio edit)	No Sounds Are Out of Bounds (2018)	3:56
10.	"Doughnuts Forever"	No Sounds Are Out of Bounds (2018)	3:31
11.	"Daze" (Missing & Messed Up Mix)	Abolition of the Royal Familia (2020)	2:54
12.	"Hawk Kings (Oseberg Buddhas Buttonhole)"	Abolition of the Royal Familia (2020)	4:56
13.	"AAA (Violeta Vicci Remix)" (Hung, Drawn & Quartered)	Abolition of the Royal Familia (Guillotine Mixes) (2021)	6:03
14.	"H.O.M.E. (High Orbs Mini Earth)"	Prism (2023)	10:36

== Charts ==
Chart performance for Orboretum: The Orb Collection
Chart (2024)	Peak position
Scottish Albums (OCC)	14
UK Album Downloads (OCC)	30
UK Dance Albums (OCC)	2
UK Independent Albums (OCC)	6
