= U.F.Off: The Best of The Orb =

U.F.Off: The Best of the Orb

Greatest hits album / Remix album/ Studio / Compilation by The Orb
- Released: 1998
- Genre: Electronic, trip hop, ambient house, dub, IDM
- Length: 72:06
- Label: Island
- Producer: The Orb

The Orb chronology
Orblivion (1997)	U.F.Off: The Best of the Orb (1998)	Cydonia (2001)

Professional ratings
Review scores
Source	Rating
AllMusic	4/5 stars
Entertainment Weekly	B+
Pitchfork Media	7.7/10

U.F.Off: The Best of the Orb is a greatest hits album by the Orb released in 1998 by Island Records. There is both a double disc and single disc version, the latter being the first disc of the former. The second disc contains alternate mixes of many of the tracks on the first. Unlike many "greatest hits" releases that include the tracks as individual, stand-alone pieces, the tracks included here are seamlessly continuously-mixed like other DJ mixes.

== Track listing ==
=== CD one ===
1. "A Huge Evergrowing Pulsating Brain That Rules From The Centre Of The Ultraworld (Orbital Dance Mix)" – 8:10
2. "Little Fluffy Clouds (Dance Mix 2)" (mixed by Youth) – 4:10
3. "Perpetual Dawn (Solar Youth Mix)" (mixed by Youth) – 3:35
4. "Blue Room (7" Mix)" – 4:01
5. "Assassin (7" Mix)" – 3:41
6. "Pomme Fritz (Meat 'N Veg)" – 7:12
7. "Toxygene (7" Edit)" – 3:31
8. "Outlands (LP Version)" – 6:10
9. "DJ Asylum (7" Edit)" – 3:56
10. "Mickey Mars (7" Edit)", previously unreleased – 3:51
11. "Towers Of Dub (Original Mix)" – 10:23
12. "Pi (Part 1) (LP Version)" – 13:26

=== CD two ===
1. "Little Fluffy Clouds (Live From Washington DC '97)" – 7:43
2. "Perpetual Dawn (Ultrabass II)" – 6:14
3. "Pomme Fritz (Orb Remix)" – 6:25
4. "Toxygene (Ganja Kru Remix)" – 6:27
5. "DJ Asylum (The Soulcatchers Mix)" – 7:12
6. "Assassin (Chocolate Hills Of Bohol Mix)" – 1:15
7. "O.O.B.E. (Pool Mix)" – 6:02
8. "A Huge Ever Growing Pulsating Brain That Rules From The Centre Of The Ultraworld (Radio Version)" – 0:58
9. "Blue Room (Ambient Mix)" – 10:00
10. "Mickey Mars (Red X Mix)" – 9:16
11. "Pi (Part 2) (Orb Remix)" – 0:27
12. "Montagne D'Or (Der Gute Berg) (Vestax Mix)" – 6:26
