= Aubrey Mixes: The Ultraworld Excursions =

Remix album by the Orb
- Released: 2 December 1991
- Genre: Ambient house
- Length: 48:55 (LP); 62:17 (CD)
- Label: Big Life
- Producer: Alex Paterson; Youth; Steve Hillage; Thomas Fehlmann; Jimmy Cauty; Eddie Manasseh

The Orb chronology
The Orb's Adventures Beyond the Ultraworld (1991)	Aubrey Mixes: The Ultraworld Excursions (1991)	U.F.Orb (1992)

The Orb remix album chronology
Aubrey Mixes: The Ultraworld Excursions (1991)	Auntie Aubrey's Excursions Beyond the Call of Duty (1996)

Professional ratings
Review scores
Source	Rating
AllMusic	4/5 stars
Entertainment Weekly	A

Aubrey Mixes: The Ultraworld Excursions is a remix album compilation by English electronic music group the Orb, which was deleted on the day it was released. The album consists of seven alternate mixes of their first album, The Orb's Adventures Beyond the Ultraworld. Five of these mixes are also available on the 2006 deluxe edition re-release of The Orb's Adventures Beyond the Ultraworld.

== Track listing ==
Big Life – BLR LP14, 511811-1:

Side one Onside Excursions
No.	Title	Length
1.	"Little Fluffy Clouds" (Cumulo Nimbus Mix)	6:42
2.	"Back Side of the Moon" (Under Water Deep Space)	8:40
3.	"Spanish Castles in Space" (Castles in Goa Mix)	9:00

Side two Offside Excursions
No.	Title	Length
1.	"Outlands" (Fountains of Elisha Mix)	8:45
2.	"A Huge Ever Growing Pulsating Brain That Rules from the Centre of the Ultraworld" (Loving You, Aubrey Mix MK 11)	7:22
3.	"Perpetual Dawn" (January Mix 3)	8:26
Total length:		48:55

CD & Cassette Bonus track
No.	Title	Length
7.	"Spanish Castles in Space" (Extended Youth Mix)	13:22
Total length:		1:02:17
