= The Orb's Adventures Beyond the Ultraworld: Patterns and Textures =

Video by The Orb
- Released: 1992
- Recorded: Brixton Fridge, London, 12 May 1991
- Genre: Ambient house
- Length: 51:08
- Label: Big Life - BLV2
- Director: Marion Waldorf and Simon Maxwell

The Orb chronology
The Orb's Adventures Beyond the Ultraworld: Patterns and Textures (1992)	C Batter C (2011)

The Orb's Adventures Beyond the Ultraworld: Patterns and Textures is a 1992 video by the UK electronic music collective The Orb. It was filmed and recorded at a live performance at Brixton Fridge, London, 12 May 1991.

A limited edition of the original UK VHS tape release came with a bonus CD (catalogue number ORBFREECD1) of the soundtrack. The soundtrack was also included as a bonus disk on a limited edition of the initial UK vinyl pressings of U.F.Orb.

== Track listing ==
1. "Little Fluffy Clouds" (Alex Paterson, Martin Glover)
2. "Earth (Gaia)" (Paterson, Kris Weston)
3. "Towers of Dub" (Patterson, Weston, Thomas Fehlmann)
4. "Perpetual Dawn" (Paterson, E. Maiden)
5. "Star 6 & 7 8 9" (Paterson, T. Green, H. Vickers)
6. "Outlands" (Paterson, Fehlmann)
7. "Outro" (Patterson, Weston)

== Credits ==
=== The Orb ===
- Alex Paterson - turntables, samples, programming
- Kris Weston (Thrash) - drums
- Nick Burton - engineering

=== Additional musicians ===
- Steve Hillage - guitars

=== Production ===
- Marion Waldorf - director
- Simon Maxwell - producer
- Recorded at the Brixton Fridge, London, Sunday 12 May 1991
- Remixed April 1992
