= Buddhist Hipsters =

2025 studio album by the Orb

Studio album by the Orb
- Released: 10 October 2025
- Length: 77:45
- Label: Cooking Vinyl
- Producer: The Orb

The Orb chronology
Orboretum: The Orb Collection (2024)	Buddhist Hipsters (2025)

Singles from Buddhist Hipsters
- 1. "Arabebonics" Released: 16 July 2025; 2. "Under the Bed" Released: 22 August 2025; 3. "It's Coming Soon" Released: 10 September 2025

Professional ratings
Aggregate scores
Source	Rating
Metacritic	77/100
Review scores
Source	Rating
AllMusic	3.5/5 stars
Classic Pop	3.5/5 stars
Mojo	4/5 stars
Record Collector	4/5 stars
The Scotsman	4/5 stars
Uncut	7/10

Buddhist Hipsters is the eighteenth studio album by English ambient house duo the Orb. The album was released on 10 October 2025 via Cooking Vinyl. It features contributions from Roger Eno, Steve Hillage and Miquette Giraudy (System 7), Youth, Paul Ferguson of Killing Joke, Andy Falconer, Trevor Walters, Violetta Vicci, Eric Von Skywalker, Andy Caine and Rrome Alone.

== Track listing ==
Buddhist Hipsters track listing
No.	Title	Writer(s)	Length
1.	"Spontaneously Combust"	Alex Paterson; Michael Rendall; Steve Hillage; Miquette Giraudy; Martin Glover	10:21
2.	"P~1"	Paterson; Rendall	6:06
3.	"Baraka"	Paterson; Rendall	7:07
4.	"A Sacred Choice"	Paterson; Rendall	5:52
5.	"Arabebonics"	Paterson; Rendall; Rrome Alone; Violeta Vicci	5:35
6.	"It's Coming Soon"	Paterson; Rendall; Andy Caine	6:20
7.	"Doll's House"	Paterson; Rendall	7:29
8.	"The Oort Cloud (Too Night)"	Paterson; Rendall; Dr D; Trevor Waters	6:58
9.	"Under the Bed"	Paterson; Rendall; Andy Falconer	9:55
10.	"Khàron"	Paterson; Rendall; Roger Eno	12:02
Total length:			77:45

== Personnel ==
Credits adapted from Tidal.

=== The Orb ===
- Alex Paterson – programming, production
- Michael Rendall – programming, production

=== Additional contributors ===
- Steve Hillage – guitar on "Spontaneously Combust"
- Youth – bass guitar on "A Sacred Choice"
- Andy Falconer – synthesizer on "A Sacred Choice"
- Eric Von Skywalker – vocals on "A Sacred Choice"
- Violeta Vicci – violin on "Arabebonics"
- Rrome Alone – vocals on "Arabebonics"
- Andy Caine – vocals on "It's Coming Soon"
- Trevor Walters – vocals on "The Oort Cloud (Too Night)
- Roger Eno – keyboards on "Khàron"

== Charts ==
Chart performance for Buddhist Hipsters
Chart (2025)	Peak position
Scottish Albums (Official Charts)	13
UK Albums (Official Charts)	77
UK Dance Albums (Official Charts)	1
UK Independent Albums (Official Charts)	2
