= COW / Chill Out, World! =

Studio album by the Orb
- Released: 14 October 2016
- Recorded: 2015–2016
- Genres: Electronica; dub; IDM; chill-out; trip hop
- Length: 43:10
- Label: Kompakt
- Producer: The Orb

The Orb chronology
| Moonbuilding 2703 AD (2015) | COW / Chill Out, World! (2016) | No Sounds Are Out of Bounds (2018) |

Professional ratings
Aggregate scores
| Source | Rating |
|---|---|
| AnyDecentMusic? | 6.6/10 |
| Metacritic | 78/100 |
Review scores
| Source | Rating |
| AllMusic | 4/5 stars |
| Exclaim! | 7/10 |
| Mixmag | 7/10 |
| Pitchfork | 6.0/10 |
| PopMatters | 9/10 |
| Record Collector | 5/5 stars |
| Release Magazine | 9/10 |
| Resident Advisor | 3.6/5 |
| Slant Magazine | 3/5 stars |
| Tiny Mix Tapes | 3.5/5 |

COW / Chill Out, World! is the fourteenth studio album by ambient house group the Orb. The album was released on 14 October 2016 via the Kompakt label.

The album was announced alongside the announcement of a full UK tour taking place between 24 November and 10 December 2016 for their 25th anniversary celebration of their debut album The Orb's Adventures Beyond the Ultraworld after their successful one-off show at the Electric Brixton on 29 July 2016.

== Background ==
COW / Chill Out, World! was recorded and produced in six months. Alex Paterson's recording of sounds using his iPhone whilst touring the world, straight to Ableton, was one of main reasons for its speedy completion. While the duo went out on tour, Paterson collected field recordings for use on the record, allowing for "valuable moments of spontaneous creative laptop productivity" while on the road. Paterson has described the album as their "most ambient album yet", while Thomas Fehlmann commented on how the pair trusted their first instincts and allowed ideas to flow freely. Fehlmann stated:

We didn't intend to rehash old chill out vibes. On the contrary. It's the 21st century and it seems like a good idea for people to sit back and chill the fuck out, before continuing to act destructively. To chill out is to act consciously, guided from a calm centre.

== Track listing ==
| No. | Title | Length |
|---|---|---|
| 1. | "First, Consider the Lillies" | 7:00 |
| 2. | "Wireless Mk2" | 5:41 |
| 3. | "Siren 33 (Orphee Mirror)" | 2:48 |
| 4. | "4am Exhale (Chill Out, World!)" | 6:03 |
| 5. | "5th Dimensions" | 5:15 |
| 6. | "Sex (Panoramic Sex Heal)" | 1:39 |
| 7. | "7 Oaks" | 2:19 |
| 8. | "Just Because I Really Really Luv Ya" | 4:22 |
| 9. | "9 Elms Over River Eno (Channel 9)" | 4:05 |
| 10. | "The 10 Sultans of Rudyard (Moo Moo Mix)" | 3:58 |
| Total length: | | 43:10 |

== Charts ==
| Chart (2016) | Peak position |
|---|---|
| Belgian Albums (Ultratop Flanders) | 116 |
| Belgian Albums (Ultratop Wallonia) | 113 |
| Scottish Albums (Official Charts) | 92 |
| UK Dance Albums (Official Charts) | 9 |
| UK Independent Albums (Official Charts) | 20 |
