= Oxbow Lakes =

Single by The Orb

from the album Orbus Terrarum
- B-side: "alternate mixes"
- Released: 15 May 1995
- Genre: Ambient house
- Length: 7:28
- Label: Island
- Songwriter(s): Thomas Fehlmann, Alex Paterson, Kris Weston
- Producer(s): Alex Paterson, Andy Hughes, Thomas Fehlmann, Darren Allison

The Orb singles chronology
"Assassin" (1992)	"Oxbow Lakes" (1995)	"Toxygene" (1997)

"Oxbow Lakes" is a single by the English electronic music group the Orb. It featured remixes from artists such as Carl Craig, Sabres of Paradise and A Guy Called Gerald. It also includes an acoustic version performed by the string sextet Instrumental which was produced and mixed by Darren Allison. It reached number thirty-eight on the UK Singles Chart.
