= Kiss (The Orb EP) =

Kiss EP

EP by the Orb
- Released: 6 June 1989
- Genre: Ambient house
- Length: 17:20
- Label: WAU/Mr. Modo Records
- Producers: Alex Paterson, Jimmy Cauty

The Orb chronology
Kiss EP (1989)	The Orb's Adventures Beyond the Ultraworld (1991)

Kiss EP is a 1989 EP by the Orb released on WAU/Mr. Modo Records on vinyl only.

== Track listing ==
Side one – Roof

1. "Kiss Your Love" – 4:28
2. "Kiss Your Love" (Suck My Kiss Mix) – 4:23

Side two – Floor

3. "The Roof Is on Fire" – 3:46
4. "Kiss Your Love" (Ambiorix Mix) – 4:43
