= More Tales from the Orbservatory =

Studio album by the Orb featuring Lee "Scratch" Perry
- Released: 3 June 2013
- Genres: Electronica, dub, IDM
- Length: 52:30
- Labels: Cooking Vinyl, The End Records
- Producer: The Orb

The Orb featuring Lee "Scratch" Perry chronology
| The Orbserver in the Star House (2012) | More Tales from the Orbservatory (2013) | Moonbuilding 2703 AD (2015) |

More Tales from the Orbservatory is the twelfth studio album from ambient house duo the Orb, released on 3 June 2013.

== Background ==
Like The Orbserver in the Star House, the album features reggae producer Lee 'Scratch' Perry on vocals. It was also recorded at the same sessions of The Orbserver in the Star House.

== Critical reception ==
Professional ratings
Aggregate scores
| Source | Rating |
|---|---|
| Metacritic | 61/100 |
Review scores
| Source | Rating |
| The Independent | 3/5 stars |
| Mojo | 2/5 stars |
| MusicOMH | 3/5 stars |
| Q | 4/5 stars |

Initial critical response to More Tales from the Orbservatory was mixed to positive. At Metacritic, which assigns a normalized rating out of 100 to reviews from mainstream critics, the album has received an average score of 61, based on 4 reviews.

== Track listing ==
| No. | Title | Length |
|---|---|---|
| 1. | "Fussball" | 4:31 |
| 2. | "Africa" | 5:33 |
| 3. | "Tight Interlude" | 1:22 |
| 4. | "Making Love in Dub" | 6:45 |
| 5. | "No Ice Age" | 4:19 |
| 6. | "Don't Rush I" | 4:37 |
| 7. | "Fussball" (Instrumental) | 4:30 |
| 8. | "Africa" (Instrumental) | 5:31 |
| 9. | "Making Love in Dub" (Instrumental) | 6:45 |
| 10. | "No Ice Age" (Instrumental) | 4:16 |
| 11. | "Don't Rush I" (Instrumental) | 4:29 |
| Total length: | | 52:30 |

== Personnel ==
The Orb

- Alex Paterson – production
- Thomas Fehlmann – production

Other personnel

- Lee 'Scratch' Perry – vocals, production
