= Prism (The Orb album) =

2023 studio album by the Orb

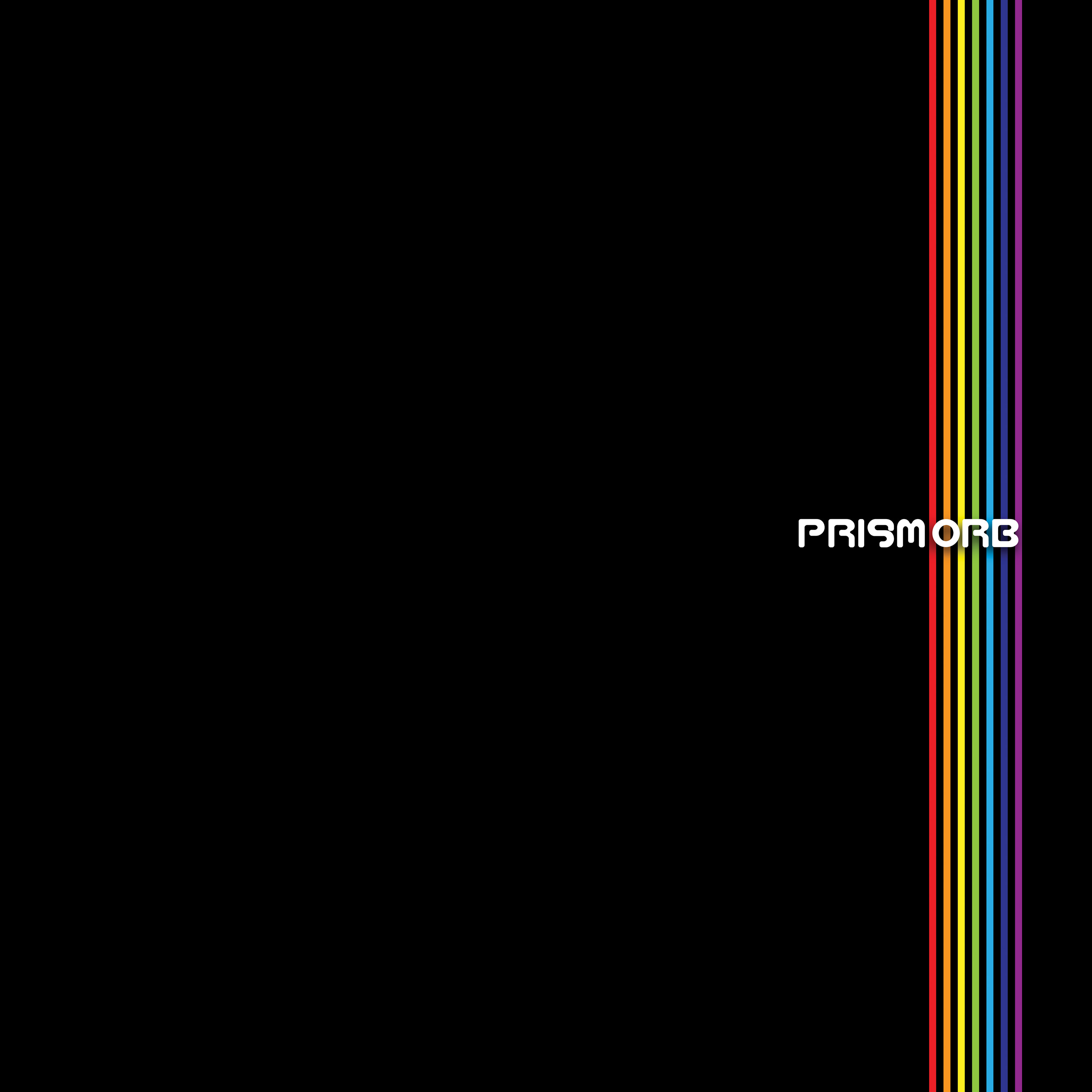

Studio album by the Orb
- Released: 28 April 2023
- Length: 70:00
- Label: Cooking Vinyl
- Producer: The Orb

The Orb chronology
Abolition of the Royal Familia (2020)	Prism (2023)	Orboretum: The Orb Collection (2024)

Singles from Prism
- 1. "Living in Recycled Times" Released: 25 January 2023; 2. "Prism" Released: 23 February 2023; 3. "H.O.M.E (High Orbs Mini Earths)" Released: 17 April 2023

Professional ratings
Aggregate scores
Source	Rating
Metacritic	65/100
Review scores
Source	Rating
AllMusic	3/5 stars
The Arts Desk	4/5 stars
Mojo	3/5 stars
MusicOMH	4/5 stars
PopMatters	7/10
Record Collector	3/5 stars
The Scotsman	4/5 stars
Uncut	6/10
XS Noize	4/5 stars

Prism is the seventeenth studio album by the English ambient house duo the Orb, consisting of Alex Paterson and Michael Rendall, released through Cooking Vinyl on 28 April 2023. It includes contributions from Youth, Violeta Vicci, Gaudi, David Harrow, Leandro Fresco, Jono Podmore and David Lofts, and features vocalists Eric Von Skywalker, Andy Cain and Rachel D'Arcy.

== Track listing ==
Prism track listing
No.	Title	Length
1.	"H.O.M.E (High Orbs Mini Earths)"	10:34
2.	"Why Can You Be in Two Places at Once, When You Can't Be Anywhere at All..." (Where's Gary's Mix)	7:40
3.	"A Ghetto Love Story"	6:11
4.	"Picking Tea Leaves & Chasing Butterflies"	6:13
5.	"Tiger"	4:32
6.	"Dragon of the Ocean" (Dogon Mix)	6:10
7.	"The Beginning of the End"	8:29
8.	"Living in Recycled Times" (featuring Rachel D'Arcy)	10:27
9.	"Prism"	9:44
Total length:		70:00

== Charts ==
Chart performance for Prism
Chart (2023)	Peak position
Scottish Albums (Official Charts)	17
UK Albums (Official Charts)	85
UK Dance Albums (Official Charts)	1
UK Independent Albums (Official Charts)	8
