= Andy Falconer =

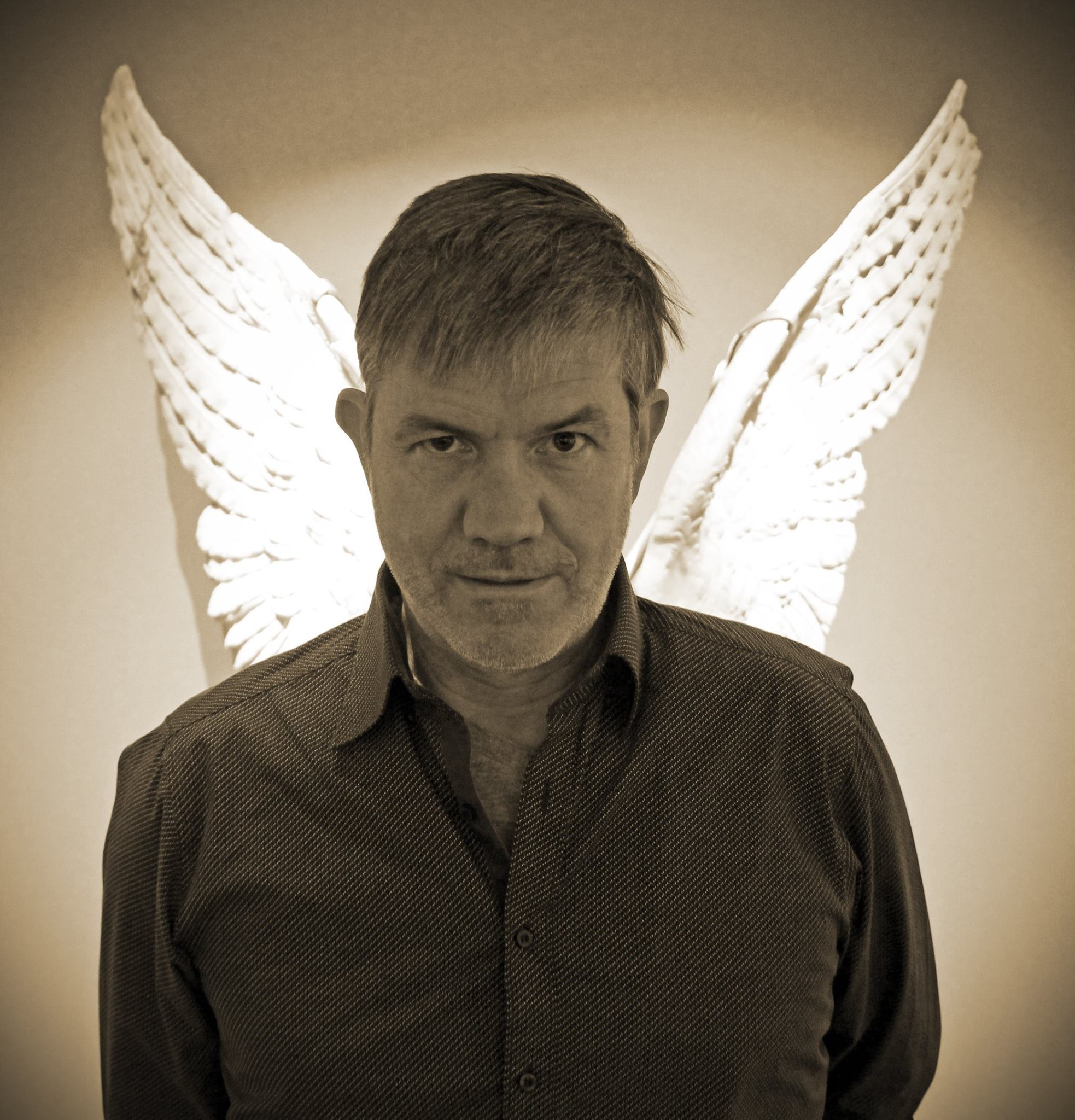

Background information
- Born: 25 July 1965 (age 59); Oxford, England
- Genres: Ambient music
- Website: https://www.afponline.eu/

Andy Falconer is an English-born engineer, producer and artist mainly associated with electronic and ambient music. As well as his own musical project afp. He is also along with Alex Paterson a member of the band Sedibus, and former member of the bands The Orb and Apollo XI.

== Background ==
Andy was born in 1965 in Oxford, England, and is the youngest of three children. His father James Falconer ran his own pharmacy while his mother Rita Falconer kept house. Andy attended the City of Oxford High School for Boys, and it was there that his interest in music and the arts first started to bloom.

== Career ==
After leaving school at 18, Andy first went to work for the sound and light hire company 722027 in Oxford. However this was short lived, and he soon departed for London and secured his first recording studio job at Falconer Studios (no relation) in Camden. Quickly graduating from Assistant to Engineer and then Producer. Andy has worked with an impressive array of artists as diverse as Eartha Kitt, Depeche Mode, The Art Of Noise, System 7, and many others.

It was in 1990 and while working as a freelance engineer at Berwick Street Studios, in Soho London, that Andy met Alex Paterson and joined The Orb for the recording of their debut album The Orb's Adventures Beyond The Ultraworlds.

Shortly after this Andy took a sabbatical from studio work, but. In 2016 returned with his own project afp, and in 2018 reconvened with Alex Paterson as the band Sedibus, for the release of the album The Heavens. This was followed by the release of the album SETI in 2024.
