= Bicycles & Tricycles =

Studio album by the Orb
- Released: 3 May 2004
- Genres: House; dub; drum and bass; trip hop
- Length: 63:55
- Label: Cooking Vinyl
- Producers: Alex Paterson; Thomas Fehlmann; John Roome

The Orb chronology
Cydonia (2001)	Bicycles & Tricycles (2004)	Okie Dokie It's The Orb on Kompakt (2005)

Professional ratings
Aggregate scores
Source	Rating
Metacritic	61/100
Review scores
Source	Rating
AllMusic	3/5 stars
The Guardian	3/5 stars
Mojo	3/5 stars
NME	3/10
Pitchfork	6.5/10
Release Magazine	7/10
Resident Advisor	4/5 stars
Rolling Stone	3/5 stars
Slant Magazine	3.5/5 stars
URB	4/5 stars

Bicycles & Tricycles is the sixth studio album by English electronic music group the Orb, released on 3 May 2004 by Cooking Vinyl. It brought together the group's style of the early 1990s with current electronic music, with its most prevalent influences being drum and bass and trip hop.

Bicycles & Tricycles received mixed reactions from critics. The Daily Telegraph praises it as being "inclusive, exploratory, and an enjoyable journey", but many other publications dismissed it as "stoner dub" and deemed it largely irrelevant to contemporary electronic music culture. NME scored the album a lowly 3/10, calling it "more of the same from an act who have been ploughing the same furrow for so long they'll be reaching the Earth's core soon".

To promote the album, the Orb began a UK tour with Mad Professor, who had remixed their work in the past. Though the Orb still pulled in large crowds, The Guardian described one London performance as "joyless" and stated that few of the new tracks "really go anywhere".

== Track listing ==
UK version

1. "Orb Is (Shopping Version)" – 4:49
2. Aftermath" – 4:40
3. "The Land of Green Ginger (rmx)" – 4:01
4. "Hell's Kitchen" – 5:23
5. "Gee Strings" – 6:41
6. "Prime Evil" – 5:14
7. "Abstractions (Trance Pennine Express)" – 6:49
8. "L.U.C.A." – 5:23
9. "From a Distance (Blast Master v The Corpral)" – 3:55
10. "Tower Twenty Three (Spud v Kreature Mix)" – 6:33
11. "Kompania (Grooved Ware Mix)" – 6:19
12. "Dilmun" – 4:02

US version

1. "Orb Is (Shopping Version)" – 4:49
2. "Aftermath" – 4:40
3. "The Land of Green Ginger" – 4:01
4. "Hell's Kitchen" – 5:23
5. "Gee Strings" – 6:41
6. "Prime Evil" – 5:14
7. "Abstractions (Trance Pennine Express)" – 6:49
8. "From a Distance (Blast Master v The Corpral)" – 3:55
9. "Tower Twenty Three (Spud v Kreature Mix)" – 6:33
10. "Kompania (Grooved Ware Mix)" – 6:19
11. "Dilmun" – 4:02

Japanese version

1. "From a Distance (12" Z Mix)" – 5:32
2. "The Land of Green Ginger (rmx)" – 4:01
3. "Hell's Kitchen" – 5:23
4. "Gee Strings" – 6:41
5. "Prime Evil" – 5:14
6. "Orb Is" – 3:28
7. "Now Here" – 5:20
8. "Abstractions (Submarium Mix)" – 6:56
9. "L.U.C.A." – 5:23
10. "Compania" – 1:54
11. "Tower Twenty Three" – 7:50
12. "Dilmun" – 4:02
