= Assassin (The Orb song) =

1992 single by the Orb

Single by the Orb
- Released: 5 October 1992
- Label: Big Life
- Songwriters: Alex Paterson, Kris Weston, Lewis Keogh
- Producers: Alex Paterson, Kris Weston, Lewis Keogh

The Orb singles chronology
"Blue Room" (1992)	"Assassin" (1992)	"Oxbow Lakes" (1995)

"Assassin" is a song by English electronic music group the Orb. It was released as a stand-alone single in October 1992 by Big Life and reached number 12 on the UK Singles Chart.

== Charts ==
Year (1992)	Peak position
UK Singles (OCC)	12
UK Dance (Music Week)	12
