= Orbus Terrarum =

Studio album by the Orb
- Released: 20 March 1995
- Genres: Ambient; ambient techno
- Length: 79:18
- Label: Island
- Producers: Alex Paterson; Andy Hughes; Thomas Fehlmann; Kris Weston

The Orb chronology
Pomme Fritz (1994)	Orbus Terrarum (1995)	Orblivion (1997)

Professional ratings
Review scores
Source	Rating
AllMusic	4/5 stars
Entertainment Weekly	A
The Guardian	3/4 stars
The Philadelphia Inquirer	3/4 stars
Rolling Stone	4/5 stars
Spin	7/10

Orbus Terrarum (stylized as Orbvs Terrarvm) is a studio album by the English electronic music group the Orb. It was released on 20 March 1995 through Island Records. The album entered the CIN's Dance Albums Chart at No. 2.

== Background and recording ==
Member Kris Weston had begun work on the album before leaving the group. After he left, German producer Thomas Fehlmann joined as a full-time studio member, and the group, now consisting of Alex Paterson, Andy Hughes, and Fehlmann, completed the album.

== Music ==
Unlike their previous efforts, Orbus Terrarum features more "earthbound", "organic" sounds in contrast to the psychedelic, science fiction-themed music they had previously written. According to Andy Beta of Pitchfork, the album is "concise and sprawling, catchy and abstract, placid and turbulent, spacey and aquatic."

The record was released on 20 March 1995 through Island Records. It entered the CIN's Dance Albums Chart at No. 2 on 1 April, and reached number 20 on the UK Albums Chart.

== Critical reception ==
According to Paterson, Orbus Terrarum suffered "a good kicking" at the hands of the British music press. The Times described it as "generic ambient music" and The Guardian said it was a low point for Paterson's creativity. Rolling Stone gave the album a more positive reception: naming it their album of the month, and citing its symphonic flow coupled with the Orb's "uniquely British wit". The music website Pitchfork placed it at number 19 on their list of the fifty best ambient music releases of all time.

== Track listing ==
No.	Title	Writer(s)	Length
1.	"Valley"	Alex Paterson, Kris Weston, Simon Phillips, Tom Green	7:35
2.	"Plateau"	Paterson, Weston, Thomas Fehlmann	13:14
3.	"Oxbow Lakes"	Paterson, Weston, Fehlmann	7:28
4.	"Montagne d'Or (Der Gute Berg)"	Paterson, Andy Hughes, B. J. Cole, Weston, Nick Burton, Fehlmann	10:40
5.	"White River Junction"	Paterson, Weston, Fehlmann	9:36
6.	"Occidental"	Paterson, Hughes, Kris Needs, Weston, Burton, Phillips, Fehlmann	13:55
7.	"Slug Dub"	Paterson, Weston, Paul Ferguson, Fehlmann	17:19
Total length:			79:16

Remix disc
No.	Title	Length
1.	"Plateau (All Hands on Deck Mix – 2AM)"	15:45
2.	"Slug Dub (Dumpy Dub)"	12:29
3.	"Valley (Mix 3 Dubby)"	10:54
4.	"White River Junction (Zoom Vinegar Mix)"	13:05
5.	"Oxbow Lakes (Andy's Space Mix)"	8:45
6.	"Peace Pudding (Occidental)"	13:31
Total length:		74:41

== Chart performance ==
Chart performance for Orbus Terrarum
Chart (1995)	Peak position
UK Dance Albums Chart (CIN)	2
