= Abolition of the Royal Familia =

Studio album by the Orb
- Released: 27 March 2020
- Genre: Ambient house
- Length: 77:45
- Label: Cooking Vinyl
- Producer: The Orb

The Orb chronology
| No Sounds Are Out of Bounds (2018) | Abolition of the Royal Familia (2020) | Prism (2023) |

Singles from Abolition of the Royal Familia
- 1. "Pervitin (Empire Culling & The Hemlock Stone Version)" Released: 6 December 2019; 2. "Hawk Kings (Oseberg Buddhas Buttonhole)" Released: 16 December 2019; 3. "Daze (Missing & Messed Up Mix)" Released: 13 February 2020

Professional ratings
Aggregate scores
| Source | Rating |
|---|---|
| AnyDecentMusic? | 7.0/10 |
| Metacritic | 73/100 |
Review scores
| Source | Rating |
| AllMusic | 3/5 stars |
| Mojo | 4/5 stars |
| MusicOMH | 4/5 stars |
| Paste | 6.8/10 |
| Pitchfork | 6.9/10 |
| Q | 4/5 stars |
| Release Magazine | 7/10 |
| The Spill Magazine | 4/5 stars |
| Uncut | 3/5 stars |
| XS Noize | 8/10 |

Abolition of the Royal Familia is the sixteenth studio album by English ambient house duo the Orb. The album was released on 27 March 2020 via Cooking Vinyl. It includes contributions from Youth, Roger Eno, Gaudi, David Harrow, and Steve Hillage and Miquette Giraudy (System 7).

== Track listing ==
Abolition of the Royal Familia track listing
| No. | Title | Length |
|---|---|---|
| 1. | "Daze" (Missing & Messed Up Mix) | 2:52 |
| 2. | "House of Narcotics" (Opium Wars Mix) | 6:07 |
| 3. | "Hawk Kings" (Oseberg Buddhas Buttonhole) | 4:57 |
| 4. | "Honey Moonies" (Brain Washed at Area 49 Mix) | 5:02 |
| 5. | "Pervitin" (Empire Culling & The Hemlock Stone Version) | 4:10 |
| 6. | "Afros, Afghans and Angels" (Helgö Treasure Chest) | 6:10 |
| 7. | "Shape Shifters (In Two Parts)" (Coffee & Ghost Train Mix) | 10:51 |
| 8. | "Say Cheese" (Siberian Tiger Cookie Mix) | 5:27 |
| 9. | "Ital Orb" (Too Blessed to Be Stressed Mix) | 7:17 |
| 10. | "The Queen of Hearts" (Princess of Clubs Mix) | 5:05 |
| 11. | "The Weekend It Rained Forever" (Oseberg Buddha Mix (The Ravens Have Left the Tower)) | 12:30 |
| 12. | "Slave Till U Die No Matter What U Buy" (L'anse Aux Meadows Mix) | 7:17 |
| Total length: | | 77:45 |

== Charts ==
Sales chart performance for Abolition of the Royal Familia
| Chart (2020) | Peak position |
|---|---|
| Belgian Albums (Ultratop Flanders) | 99 |
| Scottish Albums (Official Charts) | 6 |
| UK Albums (Official Charts) | 62 |
| UK Dance Albums (Official Charts) | 4 |

== See also ==
- List of 2020 albums
