= Daleth of Elphame EP =

EP by The Orb
- Released: 10 June 2002
- Recorded: 2001
- Label: Badorb.com
- Producer: Alex Paterson, Thomas Fehlmann, Guy Pratt, Simon Phillips

Daleth of Elphame EP is an EP by the English electronic music group The Orb, released in 2002 on Badorb.com. It was the only EP/single released by Badorb.com on CD.

== Track listing ==
"Cool Harbour" (2002)
Clip from "Cool Harbour". The sampled voice in the song is from John Cage regarding aesthetics of music.

1. I Am the Red Worm (5:11)
2. Cool Harbour (5:18)
3. Outer Space (8:13)
