= No Sounds Are Out of Bounds =

Studio album by the Orb
- Released: 22 June 2018
- Genre: Ambient house
- Length: 70:22
- Label: Cooking Vinyl
- Producer: The Orb

The Orb chronology
COW / Chill Out, World! (2016)	No Sounds Are Out of Bounds (2018)	Abolition of the Royal Familia (2020)

Singles from No Sounds Are Out of Bounds
- 1. "Doughnuts Forever" Released: 19 April 2018; 2. "Rush Hill Road" Released: 4 May 2018

Professional ratings
Aggregate scores
Source	Rating
AnyDecentMusic?	6.5/10
Metacritic	72/100
Review scores
Source	Rating
AllMusic	3.5/5 stars
The Arts Desk	4/5 stars
The A.V. Club	C+
Clash	7/10
Exclaim!	7/10
The Irish Times	2/5 stars
MusicOMH	3/5 stars
PopMatters	9/10
Q	4/5 stars
Release Magazine	9/10

No Sounds Are Out of Bounds is the fifteenth studio album by English ambient house duo the Orb. The album was released on 22 June 2018 via Cooking Vinyl. It includes contributions from Youth, Roger Eno, Hollie Cook, Guy Pratt, Jah Wobble, Gaudi, Roney FM and Michael Rendall.

== Track listing ==
No.	Title	Length
1.	"The End of the End"	3:57
2.	"Wish I Had a Pretty Dog"	5:04
3.	"Rush Hill Road"	5:55
4.	"Pillow Fight @ Shag Mountain"	7:31
5.	"Isle of Horns"	5:26
6.	"Wolfbane"	3:24
7.	"Other Blue Worlds"	8:33
8.	"Doughnuts Forever"	3:30
9.	"Drift"	1:41
10.	"Easy on the Onions"	5:46
11.	"Ununited States"	4:26
12.	"Soul Planet"	15:11
Total length:		70:22

== Charts ==
Chart (2018)	Peak position
Scottish Albums (Official Charts)	14
UK Albums (Official Charts)	51
UK Dance Albums (Official Charts)	4
UK Independent Albums (Official Charts)	5
