= Sueño Latino =

Italian house band

Sueño Latino is an Italo house band from Italy: Andrea Gemolotto, Claudio Collino, Davide Rizzatti, Riccardo Persi.

In 1989, the group released the ambient house classic "Sueño Latino." The track is based on Manuel Göttsching's album-length E2-E4. In a later release (the Winter Version), Göttsching himself added guitar parts to the track.

In some European countries it was a number 1 hit in 1989, although it only reached number 47 in the UK Singles Chart.
