= Blue Room (The Orb song) =

1992 single by the Orb

Single by the Orb

from the album U.F.Orb
- B-side: "Towers of Dub" (remix)
- Released: 8 June 1992
- Genre: Ambient house
- Length: 39:58
- Label: Big Life; WAU! Mr. Modo
- Songwriters: Alex Paterson; Miquette Giraudy; Steve Hillage; Kris Weston; John Joseph Wardle
- Producers: Alex Paterson; Kris Weston

The Orb singles chronology
"Perpetual Dawn" (1991)	"Blue Room" (1992)	"Assassin" (1992)

Audio sample
- Sample from the Orb's 40 minute version of "Blue Room": file; help

"Blue Room" is a song by English electronic music duo the Orb. It was released as a single on 8 June 1992 through Big Life Records. The full 39-minute version features a number of samples, including a small portion of the beginning of "Mysterious Traveller" by Weather Report and a damaged portion of "Happy Birthday to You" by Marilyn Monroe at the end. An edited version of the song appears on the album U.F.Orb.

"Blue Room" is the longest single to ever appear on the UK Singles Chart, at 39 minutes and 58 seconds. It entered the listing at position 12 and peaked at number eight the next week. In Ireland, the song reached number 28, and in the United States, it peaked at number 46 on the Billboard Dance Club Play chart.

== Background ==
After a number of maxi-singles had been excluded from the UK Singles Chart (or like how Prince's "Gett Off" maxi-single ended up on the UK Albums Chart), the chart compilers Chart Information Network, decided to include a rule alongside the usual 25 minute maximum playing time, which allowed 'maxi singles' to run to 40 minutes if only one title was listed amongst the single's tracks. The Orb thus decided to record a 39:58 version of "Blue Room" for a special release, as there would be only one track on the single. The title "Blue Room" is a reference to the supposed Blue Room of Wright-Patterson Air Force Base, which was investigated as a possible UFO evidence-holding room.

In addition to being the longest UK chart hit, "Blue Room" is also "possibly the most amelodic song ever to chart anywhere," according to Trouser Press.

== Top of the Pops performance ==
The Orb caused controversy when appearing on Top of the Pops to promote the single. Instead of performing, Alex Paterson and Kris Weston—the latter holding a toy sheep—played a chess-like game whilst passing a globus cruciger back and forth. The performance had a profound impact on Robbie Williams, then a member of Take That, who later declared "that Top of the Pops changed my life".

== Track listings ==
UK CD1

1. "Blue Room" – 39:58

UK CD2

1. "Blue Room" (radio 7) – 4:08
2. "Blue Room" (excerpt 605) – 5:58
3. "Towers of Dub" (Mad Professor remix) – 14:51

UK 12-inch and cassette single

1. "Blue Room" (part 1) – 18:45
2. "Blue Room" (part 2) – 19:01

US 12-inch single

A1. "Blue Room" (Frank de Wulf remix) – 7:37
A2. "Blue Room" (excerpt 606) – 10:00
B1. "Assassin" (Oasis of Rhythms mix) – 15:17

European maxi-CD single

1. "Blue Room" (radio 7) – 4:08
2. "Blue Room" – 39:58
3. "Blue Room" (excerpt 605) – 5:58
4. "Towers of Dub" (Mad Professor remix) – 14:51

== Charts ==
Chart (1992–1993)	Peak position
Europe (Eurochart Hot 100)	48
Ireland (IRMA)	28
UK Singles (Official Charts)	8
US Dance Club Play (Billboard)	46
