= The Orbserver in the Star House =

Studio album by the Orb
- Released: 28 August 2012
- Genres: Electronic; trip hop; dub; IDM
- Length: 51:22
- Labels: Cooking Vinyl, The End
- Producer: Thomas Fehlmann

The Orb chronology
Metallic Spheres (2010)	The Orbserver in the Star House (2012)	More Tales from the Orbservatory (2013)

Professional ratings
Aggregate scores
Source	Rating
AnyDecentMusic?	5.7/10
Metacritic	61/100
Review scores
Source	Rating
AllMusic	4/5 stars
Consequence of Sound	2/5 stars
FACT	3.5/5 stars
The Independent	3/5 stars
The Line of Best Fit	7/10
MusicOMH	4/5 stars
NME	5/10
Pitchfork	6.8/10
PopMatters	7/10
Rolling Stone	3.5/5 stars

The Orbserver in the Star House is the eleventh studio album by the Orb, released in August 2012, and featuring dub musician/producer Lee "Scratch" Perry. Singles from the album include "Golden Clouds" and "Soulman".

== Track listing ==
No.	Title	Length
1.	"Ball of Fire"	4:11
2.	"H. O. O."	4:14
3.	"Man in the Moon"	4:05
4.	"Soulman"	6:03
5.	"Golden Clouds"	5:45
6.	"Hold Me Upsetter"	4:21
7.	"Go Down Evil"	5:29
8.	"Thirsty"	4:36
9.	"Police & Thieves"	4:50
10.	"Ashes"	1:25
11.	"Congo"	6:23
Total length:		51:22
