= Perpetual Dawn =

1991 single by the Orb

Single by the Orb

from the album The Orb's Adventures Beyond the Ultraworld
- Released: 1991
- Genre: Dub
- Length: 9:31 (album version)
- Label: Big Life
- Songwriter(s): Paterson; Eddie Maiden
- Producer(s): The Orb

The Orb singles chronology
"Little Fluffy Clouds" (1990)	"Perpetual Dawn" (1991)	"Blue Room" (1992)

"Perpetual Dawn" is a song by English electronic music group the Orb, from their debut album, The Orb's Adventures Beyond the Ultraworld (1991). It was originally released in 1991 and re-released in 1994 and features vocals by Jeffrey Nelson and Shola. The song reached No. 61 on the UK Singles Chart during its original 1991 release and No. 18 during its 1994 reissue.

== Track listings ==
- UK release
1. "Perpetual Dawn" (Solar Youth Mix) (4:00)
2. "Star 6 & 7 8 9" (Phase II) (4:48)
3. "Perpetual Dawn" (Solar Flare Extended Mix) (6:35)
- US release
1. "Perpetual Dawn" (Solar Youth Mix) (4:00)
2. "Perpetual Dawn" (Solar Flare Extended) (6:35)
3. "Perpetual Dawn" (Ultrabass I) (8:06)
4. "Perpetual Dawn" (Ultrabass II) (7:10)
5. "Star 6 & 7 8 9" (Phase II) (4:48)

== Charts ==
Chart (1991)	Peak position
UK Singles (OCC)	61
UK Dance (Music Week)	31
UK Club Chart (Record Mirror)	50

Chart (1994)	Peak position
UK Singles (OCC)	18
UK Airplay (Music Week)	31
