= A Huge Ever Growing Pulsating Brain That Rules from the Centre of the Ultraworld =

"A Huge Ever Growing Pulsating Brain That Rules From the Centre of the Ultraworld"

Single by The Orb

from the album The Orb's Adventures Beyond the Ultraworld
- B-side: "Alternate mixes"
- Released: 21 October 1989
- Genre: Ambient house
- Length: 19:07
- Label: WAU! Mr. Modo Records; Big Life
- Songwriters: Paterson, Jimmy Cauty, Minnie Riperton, Richard Rudolph, Simon Darlow, Stephen Lipson, Bruce Woolley, Trevor Horn
- Producer: The Orb

The Orb singles chronology
"A Huge Ever Growing Pulsating Brain That Rules From the Centre of the Ultraworld" (1989)	"Little Fluffy Clouds" (1990)

"A Huge Ever Growing Pulsating Brain That Rules From the Centre of the Ultraworld (Orbital Dance Mix)"
This excerpt is from the "Orbital Dance Mix", which featured the vocals of Minnie Riperton unlike the album version.

"A Huge Ever Growing Pulsating Brain That Rules from the Centre of the Ultraworld" is the debut single by the ambient house group the Orb. It was originally released in October 1989 and made the UK Singles Chart in 1990, peaking at #78. The 'Peel Session' version was also voted into #10 place in John Peel's 1990 Festive Fifty. In April 1991, the track was released on the debut album The Orb's Adventures Beyond the Ultraworld. The title is taken from a sound effects track from Blake's 7 on BBC Sound Effects No. 26 - Sci-Fi Sound Effects titled "The Core, A Huge Evergrowing Pulsating Brain which Rules from the Centre of Ultraworld".

The ethereal chord progression used throughout was sampled from the album version of Grace Jones song "Slave to the Rhythm".

The song was featured on the soundtrack of the video game Grand Theft Auto: Episodes from Liberty City.

== History ==
Throughout 1989, the Orb, along with Martin "Youth" Glover, developed the musical genre of ambient house through use of a diverse array of samples and recordings. The track includes sound effects and samples from science fiction radio plays, nature sounds, and Minnie Riperton's "Lovin' You". Upon the single's release, Riperton's management forced record label Big Life to remove the unlicensed Riperton sample, ensuring that only the initial first-week release of the single contained the original vocals of Minnie Riperton; subsequent pressings used vocals from a sound-alike.

The single is 19 minutes and seven seconds long. It reached #78 on the UK singles chart. For their early releases the Orb often included "Orbital" remixes, which were by the band themselves. Following this single and its immediate follow-up the band discontinued the practice in order to avoid confusion with the band Orbital.

Paterson regarded the quick live mix for a John Peel session on BBC Radio 1 in December 1989 as the best they ever did.

UK Singles Chart
Week	01	02	03
Position	93	78	90

== Track listing ==
=== 12": WAU! Mr.Modo / MWS 17T (UK) ===
1. "A Huge Ever Growing Pulsating Brain... – Loving You" (Orbital Mix) – 19:07
2. "A Huge Ever Growing Pulsating Brain..." (Bucket and Spade Mix) – 5:50
3. "A Huge Ever Growing Pulsating Brain..." (Why Is Six Scared of Seven?) – 5:30
- Released October 1989

=== 12": WAU! Mr.Modo / MWS 17R (UK) ===
1. "A Huge Ever Growing Remix" (Orbital Dance Mix) – 7:05
2. "A Huge Ever Growing Remix" (Orbital Radio Mix) – 3:34
3. "A Huge Ever Growing Remix" (Aubrey Mix Mk 2) – 8:38
- Released January 1990

=== CD: Big Life / BLR 270CD (UK) ===
1. "A Huge Ever Growing Pulsating Brain... – Loving You" (Orbital Mix) – 19:07
- Called "Compactdisc"
- Released June 1990, re-issued March 1994 [BLRDB 27]

=== CD: Big Life / BLR 27CD (UK) ===
1. "A Huge Ever Growing Pulsating Brain..." (Orbital Dance Mix) – 8:19
2. "A Huge Ever Growing Pulsating Brain..." (Orbital 9AM Radio Mix) – 3:11
3. "A Huge Ever Growing Pulsating Brain..." (Aubrey Mix Mk 1) – 6:06
- Labeled as "Jimmy Cauty Remixes"
- "Aubrey Mix Mk 1" is an edit of "Aubrey Mix Mk 2"
- Called "Compactdisco"
- Released July 1990, re-issued March 1994 [BLRDA 27]
