= The Orb's Adventures Beyond the Ultraworld =

Studio album by the Orb
- Released: 2 April 1991
- Studios: Do Not Erase, Marcus, Berwick Street, and Trancentral, London
- Genres: Electronic; ambient house; dance; chill-out; ambient dub
- Length: 109:41
- Label: Big Life
- Producers: Alex Paterson; Andy Falconer; Kris Weston; Jimmy Cauty

The Orb chronology
| Kiss EP (1989) | The Orb's Adventures Beyond the Ultraworld (1991) | U.F.Orb (1992) |

Singles from The Orb's Adventures Beyond the Ultraworld
- 1. "A Huge Ever Growing Pulsating Brain That Rules from the Centre of the Ultraworld" Released: 21 October 1989; 2. "Little Fluffy Clouds" Released: 16 November 1990; 3. "Perpetual Dawn" Released: 24 January 1991

Alternate cover
- Cover of original US release

The Orb's Adventures Beyond the Ultraworld is the debut studio album by the English electronic music group the Orb, released as a double album on 2 April 1991 by Big Life. It is a segued, progressive record evoking a psychedelic trip which draws from various genres (including ambient, house, dub reggae, and hip-hop) and incorporates a huge number of samples and sound effects. Much of the album was recorded after founding member Jimmy Cauty left the group, leaving Alex Paterson as the central member, with additional contributions by Kris Weston, Andy Falconer and several others.

The album was preceded by the charting (No. 78) 1989 single "A Huge Ever Growing Pulsating Brain That Rules from the Centre of the Ultraworld," which closes the album, (No. 87) 1990 single "Little Fluffy Clouds (No.10)," which opens the album, and (No. 61) 1991 single "Perpetual Dawn," which opens the second half of the album. The Orb's Adventures Beyond the Ultraworld was well received in Europe and reached number 29 on the UK Albums Chart. It has since been credited with popularizing the UK's nascent ambient house movement.

== Background ==
Alex Paterson began his music career in the 1980s as a roadie for the post-punk band Killing Joke before eventually leaving in 1986 to pursue his own musical interests. Influenced by the growing popularity of Chicago house music in Britain during the decade, shortly thereafter he began working with another ambient house pioneer, Jimmy Cauty, who had been involved in the Killing Joke side-project Brilliant with Paterson's childhood friend Youth. Paterson, Cauty, and Youth also performed chill-out DJ sets in Paul Oakenfold's "Land of Oz" night at the club Heaven. Paterson said of these events:

We'd build melodies up by overdubbing and mixing multiple tracks and then take an eight-track, or was it a twelve-track, into Heaven, just linking it up to three decks, loads of CD players, loads of cassettes... we used to keep it very, very quiet. We never used to play any drums in there. It'd be, just like, you know, BBC sound effects, really... four or five hours playing really early dub reggae... For All Mankind. We had white screens so we could put up visuals as well. We had home movies of ducks in the park. We'd go for everything. It was all layering on top of each other.

Following success in the singles market with their releases as the Orb, including 1988's "Tripping on Sunshine" and the Kiss EP and "A Huge Ever Growing Pulsating Brain That Rules from the Centre of the Ultraworld", both released in 1989, Paterson and Cauty started work on the first Orb album but split in April 1990 due to disagreements about releasing the Orb's work on Cauty and Bill Drummond's record label KLF Communications. While Cauty released his portions of the planned album as Space and continued with his other group The KLF, Paterson moved on to his next collaboration, "Little Fluffy Clouds", in autumn 1990 with Youth. The track was recorded by an 18-year-old studio engineer and future Orb collaborator, Kris "Thrash" Weston.

== Music ==
Slant Magazine critic Sal Cinquemani called The Orb's Adventures Beyond the Ultraworld a blend of "loping house beats and shades of reggae-dub with atmospheric sampledelia (film dialogue, wildlife, radio broadcasts, strings and choirs)" which defined the ambient house movement of the early 1990s. Matt Anniss of International DJ noted the album's "then unique blend of head-nodding grooves (often recycled from old hip-hop and dub reggae records), horizontal ambience, and all manner of tongue-in-cheek spoken word samples."

== Release ==
In April 1991, the Orb released The Orb's Adventures Beyond the Ultraworld for an audience familiar with their groundbreaking singles and several John Peel radio sessions. The album was received in the United Kingdom and Europe with critical acclaim and reached number 29 on the UK Albums Chart.

By mid-1991, the Orb had signed a deal to release the album in the United States but were forced to edit the double-disc 109:41-minute UK release down to one 70:41-minute disc. This version replaced "Perpetual Dawn" with a remix by Youth and "Star 6 & 7 8 9" with its "Phase II" version, both available on the "Perpetual Dawn" single; and removed "Back Side of the Moon" and "Spanish Castles in Space" entirely. The full double-disc version and cassette were later released in the US by Island Records.

== Artwork ==
The cover for The Orb's Adventures Beyond the Ultraworld was designed by graphic design collective The Designers Republic, who are credited for "orbsonic love deep space & sampling image" in the liner notes. The album booklet features an image of the Battersea Power Station, as photographed by Richard Cheadle and "treated by dr/chromagene", as well as an image of cumulonimbus clouds over the Congo Basin, taken from the Space Shuttle Challenger on 1 April 1983. The Battersea Power Station image was utilized as cover art for the US release of the album.

== Reception ==
Professional ratings
Review scores
| Source | Rating |
|---|---|
| AllMusic | 5/5 stars |
| The Encyclopedia of Popular Music | 5/5 stars |
| NME | 8/10 |
| The Rolling Stone Album Guide | 3.5/5 stars |
| Select | 3/5 |
| Slant Magazine | 4/5 stars |
| Spin Alternative Record Guide | 9/10 |

In a contemporary review, NME critic Sherman called The Orb's Adventures Beyond the Ultraworld "an album sounding like Pink Floyd without all the self-indulgent solos", concluding, "Reality is inside a pair of headphones overflowing with the Orb. Life will never be the same again. The flotation tank beckons." Select's Russell Brown wrote that "long and strange as it is, Adventures Beyond the Ultraworld is without doubt a good trip." The Washington Post considered it "eight slices of meandering electro-throb, decorated with whooshes and chatter and various found noises". The Province labeled the album "a lengthy sound montage that endeavors to take ambient house music off of the dance floor and place it square into the third eye of those who like to bliss out with headphones". At the end of 1991, Melody Maker ranked it as the year's 22nd best album and commented that it "boasted some of the most unique sounds of the year."

In the years following its release, The Orb's Adventures Beyond the Ultraworld has received continued critical acclaim. It was voted the 45th greatest album of all time in a 1993 poll of NME staff members. In 1999, it was included at number 82 in Spin's list of the best albums of the 1990s, with critic Richard Gehr opining that "Ultraworld is art at its most functional: It works equally well as both acid-peak booster rocket and as Prozac-ian relief from an ecstatic all-nighter." In 2002, Muzik named it the seventh best dance music album of all time, while Slant Magazine listed it as the fourth greatest electronic music album of the 20th century. The following year, Pitchfork ranked it as the 100th best album of the 1990s, with Alex Linhardt's accompanying write-up noting that it "managed to make ambient house a perpetual 'next big thing' for the rest of the decade." John Bush of AllMusic deemed The Orb's Adventures Beyond the Ultraworld "the album that defined the ambient house movement."

== Track listing ==
=== Original UK release (double album) ===
Side one
| No. | Title | Music | Length |
|---|---|---|---|
| 1. | "Little Fluffy Clouds" (Earth Orbit One) | Alex Paterson, Martin Glover | 4:27 |
| 2. | "Earth (Gaia)" (Earth Orbit Two) | Paterson, Kris Weston | 9:48 |
| 3. | "Supernova at the End of the Universe" (Earth Orbit Three) | Paterson, Miquette Giraudy, Steve Hillage | 11:56 |
| Total length: | | | 26:11 |

Side two
| No. | Title | Music | Length |
|---|---|---|---|
| 1. | "Back Side of the Moon" (Lunar Orbit Four) | Paterson, Giraudy, Hillage | 14:15 |
| 2. | "Spanish Castles in Space" (Lunar Orbit Five) | Paterson, Jake le Mesurier, Guy Pratt | 15:05 |
| Total length: | | | 29:20 |

Side three
| No. | Title | Music | Length |
|---|---|---|---|
| 1. | "Perpetual Dawn" (Ultraworld Probe Six) | Paterson, Eddie Maiden | 9:31 |
| 2. | "Into the Fourth Dimension" (Ultraworld Probe Seven) | Paterson, Andy Falconer, Paul Ferguson | 9:16 |
| 3. | "Outlands" (Ultraworld Probe Eight) | Paterson, Thomas Fehlmann | 8:23 |
| Total length: | | | 27:10 |

Side four
| No. | Title | Music | Length |
|---|---|---|---|
| 1. | "Star 6 & 7 8 9" (Ultraworld Nine) | Paterson, T Green, Hugh Vickers | 8:10 |
| 2. | "A Huge Ever Growing Pulsating Brain That Rules from the Centre of the Ultraworld" (Live Mix Mk 10; Ultraworld Ten) | Paterson, Jimmy Cauty, Minnie Riperton, Richard Rudolph, Simon Darlow, Stephen Lipson, Bruce Woolley, Trevor Horn | 18:49 |
| Total length: | | | 26:57 |

- On CD, Sides 1 & 2 appeared on Disc 1 (the "orbit compact disc") and Sides 3 & 4 appeared on Disc 2 (the "ultraworld compact disc".)

=== Original US release ===
Side one
| No. | Title | Music | Length |
|---|---|---|---|
| 1. | "Little Fluffy Clouds" | Paterson, Glover | 4:57 |
| 2. | "Earth (Gaia)" | Paterson, Weston | 9:48 |
| Total length: | | | 14:15 |

Side two
| No. | Title | Music | Length |
|---|---|---|---|
| 1. | "Supernova at the End of the Universe" | Paterson, Giraudy, Hillage | 11:56 |
| 2. | "Perpetual Dawn" (Solar Youth Mix) | Paterson, Glover, Maiden, Jeffrey Nelson, Simon Phillips | 3:48 |
| Total length: | | | 15:44 |

Side three
| No. | Title | Music | Length |
|---|---|---|---|
| 1. | "Into the Fourth Dimension" | Paterson, Falconer, Ferguson | 9:14 |
| 2. | "Outlands" | Paterson, Fehlmann | 8:20 |
| 3. | "Star 6 & 7 8 9" (Phase II) | Paterson, Green, Vickers | 4:22 |
| Total length: | | | 21:56 |

Side four
| No. | Title | Music | Length |
|---|---|---|---|
| 1. | "A Huge Ever Growing Pulsating Brain That Rules from the Centre of the Ultraworld" (Live Mix Mk 10) | Paterson, Cauty, Riperton, Rudolph, Darlow, Lipson, Woolley, Horn | 18:47 |
| Total length: | | | 18:47 |

- On CD, Sides 1, 2, 3 & 4 appeared on 1 disc.

=== 2006 UK deluxe edition ===
Disc one
| No. | Title | Music | Length |
|---|---|---|---|
| 1. | "Little Fluffy Clouds" | Paterson, Glover | 4:27 |
| 2. | "Earth (Gaia)" | Paterson, Weston | 9:48 |
| 3. | "Supernova at the End of the Universe" | Paterson, Giraudy, Hillage | 11:56 |
| 4. | "Back Side of the Moon" | Paterson, Giraudy, Hillage | 14:15 |
| 5. | "Spanish Castles in Space" | Paterson, le Mesurier, Pratt | 15:05 |
| Total length: | | | 55:31 |

Disc two
| No. | Title | Music | Length |
|---|---|---|---|
| 1. | "Perpetual Dawn" | Paterson, Maiden | 9:31 |
| 2. | "Into the Fourth Dimension" | Paterson, Falconer, Ferguson | 9:16 |
| 3. | "Outlands" | Paterson, Fehlmann | 8:23 |
| 4. | "Star 6 & 7 8 9" | Paterson, Green, Vickers | 8:10 |
| 5. | "A Huge Ever Growing Pulsating Brain That Rules from the Centre of the Ultraworld" (Live Mix Mk 10) | Paterson, Cauty, Riperton, Rudolph, Darlow, Lipson, Woolley, Horn | 18:49 |
| Total length: | | | 54:07 |

Disc three
| No. | Title | Mixed by | Length |
|---|---|---|---|
| 1. | "A Huge Ever Growing Pulsating Brain That Rules from the Centre of the Ultraworld" (Peel Session) | | 20:14 |
| 2. | "Perpetual Dawn" (Ultrabass II) | | 7:12 |
| 3. | "Little Fluffy Clouds" (Cumulo Nimbus Mix) | Pal Joey | 6:39 |
| 4. | "Back Side of the Moon" (Under Water Deep Space Mix) | Steve Hillage | 8:42 |
| 5. | "Outlands" (Fountains of Elisha Mix) | Ready Made | 8:39 |
| 6. | "A Huge Ever Growing Pulsating Brain That Rules from the Centre of the Ultraworld" (Aubrey Mix Mk 11) | Jimmy Cauty and Dr. Alex Patterson | 7:13 |
| 7. | "Spanish Castles in Space" (Extended Youth Mix) | Youth | 13:39 |
| Total length: | | | 1:12:18 |

== Tracks details ==
=== Instrumentation and samples ===
- "Little Fluffy Clouds":
  - A vocal sample of John Waite, presenter of Face the Facts ("Over the past few years to the traditional sounds of an English summer, the droning of lawnmowers, the smack of leather on willow, has been added a new noise.")
  - "A Conversation with Rickie Lee Jones" by Rickie Lee Jones, an interview from a promotional CD which came with some copies of her album Flying Cowboys. This sample was the subject of litigation.
  - "Electric Counterpoint: III. Fast" by Steve Reich, performed by Pat Metheny
  - "Man with a Harmonica" by Ennio Morricone
  - "Jump into the Fire" by Harry Nilsson, source of the main drum loop.
- "Earth (Gaia)"
  - Dialogue by Max von Sydow and Peter Wyngarde from the film Flash Gordon
  - Vocal samples of the Apollo 11 Moon landing from the documentary film For All Mankind
  - Hendrick Van Dyke from the Family Bible Reading Fellowship reading Book of Amos 9:13–15
  - At 6:19 into the track, a sample of a Lithuanian news report: "Jie pasirašė lyg ir sutartį su Azerbaidžiano komunistų partija. [...] Didelį svorį pajuto tautiškai nusiteikę azerbaidžianiečiai, jų populiarusis Laisvės Frontas, kuris būtų tolygus mūsų Sąjudžiui. Jie pasirašė lyg ir sutartį su Azerbaidžiano komunistų partija." ("They seem to have signed the agreement with the Communist Party of Azerbaijan [...] Nationally minded Azerbaijanis felt their big weight, their popular Freedom Front, which would be equivalent to our Sąjūdis movement. They seem to have signed the agreement with the Communist Party of Azerbaijan".)
- "Supernova at the End of the Universe"
  - "Synthetic Substition" by Melvin Bliss
  - Various flight instructions from Apollo 11 and Apollo 17 from the NASA documentary For All Mankind.
  - Various NASA samples
  - A vocal sample of Slim Pickens shouting "Yahoo!" from the film Dr. Strangelove or: How I Learned to Stop Worrying and Love the Bomb
- "Back Side of the Moon"
  - Various NASA samples
  - A vocal sample from the album Some Product: Carri on Sex Pistols by the Sex Pistols.
- "Spanish Castles in Space"
  - "Spartacus Love Theme" by Bill Evans
  - Narration from the Soviet field recording album Звуковые И Биоэлектрические Сигналы Рыб (Audio and Bioelectric Signals of Fishes)
- "Perpetual Dawn"
  - "Peppermint Twist" by Joey Dee and the Starliters
- "Into the Fourth Dimension"
  - A vocal excerpt from "Miserere" by Gregorio Allegri.
  - An excerpt from the 2nd Movement of the "L'amoroso" Violin Concerto in E major, RV271 by Antonio Vivaldi.
- "Outlands"
  - "Love Without Sound" by White Noise
  - "Blackboard Jungle Dub" by Lee "Scratch" Perry
  - "A Conversation with Rickie Lee Jones" by Rickie Lee Jones, an interview from a promotional CD which came with some copies of her album Flying Cowboys. This sample was the subject of litigation.
  - "Some Love" by New Age Steppers
  - "Hot Tip" by Prince Django
  - "Europe Endless" by Kraftwerk.
  - An organ sound patch from a Casio CZ-101 synthesizer
- "A Huge Ever Growing Pulsating Brain That Rules from the Centre of the Ultraworld"
  - "Lovin' You" by Minnie Riperton
  - "Slave to the Rhythm" by Grace Jones

== Personnel ==
Credits for The Orb's Adventures Beyond the Ultraworld adapted from liner notes.

- Alex Paterson – production, engineering, mixing
- Jimmy Cauty – production ("A Huge Ever Growing Pulsating Brain That Rules from the Centre of the Ultraworld")
- Andy Falconer – production ("Into the Fourth Dimension"), engineering, mixing
- Thomas Fehlmann – mixing
- Miquette Giraudy – production ("Supernova at the End of the Universe", "Back Side of the Moon")
- Steve Hillage – production ("Supernova at the End of the Universe", "Back Side of the Moon")
- Greg Hunter – engineering (assistant)
- Eddie Maiden – production ("Perpetual Dawn")
- Guy Pratt – bass ("Spanish Castles in Space")
- Tim Russell – engineering, mixing
- Kris "Thrash" Weston – engineering, mixing
- Youth – production ("Little Fluffy Clouds"), mixing

== Release history ==
Cover of a 2006 reissued 3-CD deluxe edition

| Year | Format | Label | Catalogue no. |
|---|---|---|---|
| 1991 | CD | Big Life | 314-511034-2 |
| 1991 | Cassette | Big Life | 314-511034-4 |
| 1991 | CD | Big Life | 511034 |
| 1991 | Cassette | Big Life | 511034 |
| 1994 | CD | Big Life, Island Red | 535005 |
| 1994 | Cassette | Big Life, Island Red | 535005 |
| 1994 | CD | Big Life | BRDCD5 |
| 2006 | CD | Island, Universal | 948,002-2 |

== Charts ==
| Chart (1991) | Peak position |
|---|---|
| UK Albums (OCC) | 29 |

== Certifications ==
Certifications for The Orb's Adventures Beyond the Ultraworld
| Region | Certification | Certified units/sales |
|---|---|---|
| United Kingdom (BPI) | Silver | 60,000^{^} |
^{^} Shipments figures based on certification alone.
