= Little Fluffy Clouds =

1990 single by the Orb

Single by the Orb

from the album The Orb's Adventures Beyond the Ultraworld
- B-side: "Into the Fourth Dimension"
- Released: 16 November 1990
- Genre: Ambient house
- Length: 4:27 (album version)
- Label: Big Life
- Songwriters: Martin Glover; Alex Paterson; Steve Reich
- Producer: The Orb

The Orb singles chronology
"A Huge Ever Growing Pulsating Brain That Rules from the Centre of the Ultraworld" (1989)	"Little Fluffy Clouds" (1990)	"Perpetual Dawn" (1991)

"Little Fluffy Clouds" (1990)
Clip from The Orb's "Little Fluffy Clouds", featuring vocal samples of Rickie Lee Jones.

"Little Fluffy Clouds" is a single released by the British ambient house group the Orb. It was originally released in November 1990 on the record label Big Life and peaked at number 87 on the UK Singles Chart. The Orb also included it on their 1991 double album The Orb's Adventures Beyond the Ultraworld. "Little Fluffy Clouds" was re-released several times with different B-sides, with its 1993 re-release reaching number 10 in the UK.

It ranked number 275 in NME's list of "The 500 Greatest Songs of All Time". Pitchfork Media ranked it number 40 on their list of the "Top 200 Tracks of the 1990s".

== Production ==
Alex Paterson had previously worked with Jimmy Cauty as the Orb. Upon Cauty's departure from the Orb, Paterson began work on "Little Fluffy Clouds" with ex-Killing Joke member Martin "Youth" Glover. However, because of other production obligations, Glover did not become a permanent member of the Orb. Kris "Thrash" Weston joined the Orb soon after. Weston mixed and engineered several versions of "Little Fluffy Clouds", including the version on The Orb's Adventures Beyond the Ultraworld.

== Samples ==
Pat Metheny "Electric Counterpoint III Fast" (1989)
25 seconds of "Electric Counterpoint III Fast" performed by Pat Metheny. Composed by Steve Reich.

"Little Fluffy Clouds" makes extensive use of clips from an interview by Carl Arrington with American singer Rickie Lee Jones in which she recalls picturesque images of her childhood. The theory that the samples come from a conversation between Jones and LeVar Burton on the children's television program Reading Rainbow is incorrect. Instead, the samples come from a CD of interviews with Rickie Lee Jones included with the box set promoting Jones' album Flying Cowboys. The interviewer is not credited on the recording or in the boxed set's liner notes, but is identified as Carl Arrington in the box set's cover letter. The entire spoken excerpt is played at the song’s beginning, and shorter segments of Jones’s voice are integrated throughout as a motif:

Arrington: "What were the skies like when you were young?"

Jones: "They went on forever — They — When I w— We lived in Arizona, and the skies always had little fluffy clouds in 'em, and, uh... they were long... and clear and... there were lots of stars at night. And, uh, when it would rain, it would all turn — it— They were beautiful, the most beautiful skies as a matter of fact. Um, the sunsets were purple and red and yellow and on fire, and the clouds would catch the colours everywhere. That's uh, neat 'cause I used to look at them all the time, when I was little. You don't see that. You might still see them in the desert."

Jones' record company initially sued Big Life over the unauthorized use of her voice. Eventually, a settlement was reached out of court for an undisclosed sum of money for the use of her voice on the Orb's recording. In 2016, Paterson said the record company paid $5,000 to use the sample. Asked about the sample in an interview years later, Jones referred to the Orb as "those fuckers."

The song also uses a harmonica sample from Ennio Morricone's "Man with a Harmonica" (from the film Once Upon a Time in the West) and parts of Electric Counterpoint, a piece for multi-tracked guitars composed by Steve Reich and recorded by Pat Metheny. According to Glover, the inspiration for the track came when an Orb fan who worked in a Birmingham record shop sent him a tape with Electric Counterpoint on one side and the Rickie Lee Jones interview on the other. Reich was "genuinely flattered" by the Orb's use of his work and instructed his record company not to sue. Nonetheless, the Orb did receive a letter from Reich's lawyers several years later, but Paterson described Reich as "a proper gentleman: he wanted 20% from then on and asked us to do a remix of one of his tunes, which we did". Alex Paterson also suggested that the drum track was sampled: "If anyone actually knew where the drums on 'Little Fluffy Clouds' came from, they'd all just die, but I'm not at liberty to tell. Record companies have always warned me, 'Don't tell anyone where you got your samples until we get them cleared!'". He later said that the drum track was sampled from Harry Nilsson's album Nilsson Schmilsson, and others have specifically identified this as a sample of Jim Gordon's drum solo from "Jump Into the Fire", slowed down approximately from 45 to 33 rpm, starting at 3:58. The use of a slowed-down "Jump Into the Fire" was acknowledged by Paterson in a 2016 interview with The Guardian, in which he also said the track included a Lee "Scratch" Perry sample.

In 2006, a previously uncredited sample from "Little Fluffy Clouds" was recognised by MTV label director Dan Waite, who identified the first voice heard on the song as that of his cousin John Waite. A 1990 John Waite BBC Radio 4 broadcast for the programme You and Yours was sampled and features at the beginning of the track. John Waite can clearly be heard saying, "Over the past few years, to the traditional sounds of an English summer – the drone of lawnmowers, and the smack of leather on willow – has been added a new noise...". In 2013, the Orb's management asked John Waite to join them on their 25th Anniversary tour to read the classic line live on stage.

== Commercial reception ==
"Little Fluffy Clouds" reached number 87 on the UK Singles Chart and was a dancefloor success. After the popularity of following Orb albums, "Little Fluffy Clouds" was re-released several times, including a 1993 edition which peaked at number 10 on the UK chart.

== Legacy ==
In 2010, Pitchfork Media ranked "Little Fluffy Clouds" number 40 on their list of the "Top 200 Tracks of the 1990s". In 2014, it was ranked number 275 in NME's list of "The 500 Greatest Songs of All Time". In 2022, Rolling Stone ranked it number 169 in their "200 Greatest Dance Songs of All Time" list. In 2025, Billboard magazine ranked the song number 99 in their "The 100 Best Dance Songs of All Time".

== Critical reception ==
Reviewed at the time of release, Steve Lamacq of NME said it was "the most stomachable piece of post-Ambient House you'll find in the shops this month. Naturally it's too long, but it has that resourceful touch of ingenuity that sets it apart from 90% of dance records."

== Track listings ==
- 7-inch: Big Life / BLR 33 (UK)
1. "Little Fluffy Clouds [Seven Inch MK 1]" (4:05)
2. "Little Fluffy Clounds [Ambient MK 1]" (4:29)
- 12-inch: Big Life / BLR 33T (UK)
1. "Little Fluffy Clouds [Dance MK 2]" (8:26)
2. "Into The Fourth Dimension [Essenes Beyond Control]" (7:03)
3. "Little Fluffy Clounds [Ambient MK 1]" (4:29)
- 12-inch: Big Life / BLR 33R (UK)
1. "Little Fluffy Clouds (Drum & Vox Version)" (7:10)
2. "Little Fluffy Clouds [Seven Inch MK 1]" (4:05)
3. "Into the Fourth Extension" (9:05)
- CD: Big Life / BLRD 98 (UK)
1. "Little Fluffy Clouds [Seven Inch MK 1]" (4:05)
2. "Little Fluffy Clouds [Dance MK 2]" (8:26)
3. "Into The Fourth Dimension [Essenes Beyond Control]" (7:03)
4. "Little Fluffy Clounds [Ambient MK 1]" (4:29)
- 12-inch: Mercury / 865139-1 (US)
1. "Little Fluffy Clouds [Cumulonimbus Mix]" (6:10)
2. "Little Fluffy Clouds [Dis Joint Don't Argue Mix]" (6:38)
3. "Little Fluffy Clouds [Seven Inch MK 1]" (4:05)
4. "Little Fluffy Clouds [Inner Master Mix]" (3:58)
5. "Outlands [Fountain Of Elisha]" (8:00)
- CD: Mercury / 865139-2 (US)
1. "Little Fluffy Clouds [Seven Inch MK 1]" (4:05)
2. "Little Fluffy Clouds [Inner Master Mix]" (3:58)
3. "Little Fluffy Clouds [Cumulonimbus Mix]" (6:10)
4. "Little Fluffy Clouds [Dance MK 2]" (8:26)
5. "Little Fluffy Clouds [Heavyweight Dub]" (6:30)
6. "Outlands [Fountain Of Elisha]" (8:00)

== Charts ==
Chart (1990)	Peak position
UK Singles (Official Charts)	87

Chart (1993)	Peak position
Europe (Eurochart Hot 100)	30
UK Singles (Official Charts)	10

== Certifications ==
Certifications for Little Fluffy Clouds
Region	Certification	Certified units/sales
United Kingdom (BPI)	Silver	200,000^{‡}
^{‡} Sales+streaming figures based on certification alone.
