= The Orb =

English electronic music duo

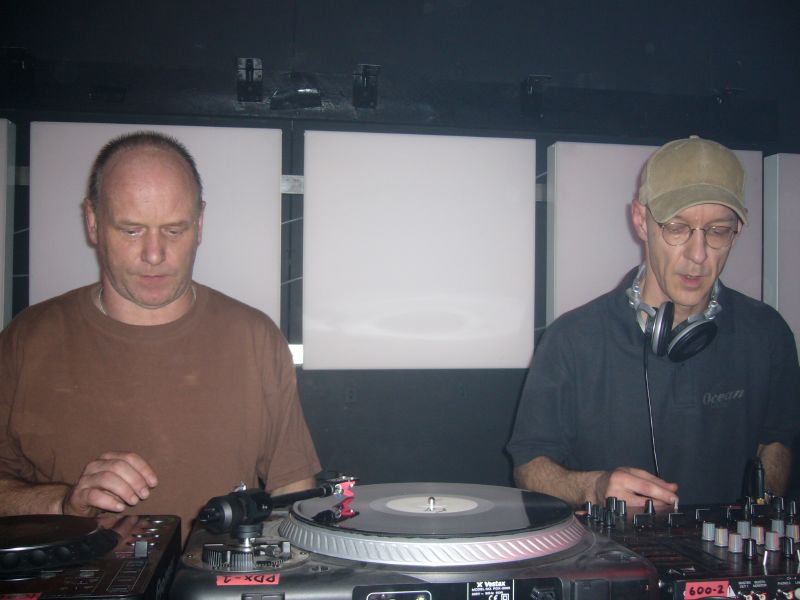
- Alex Paterson and Thomas Fehlmann of the Orb at Culture Box in Copenhagen in 2005

Background information
- Origin: London, England
- Genres: Ambient house; dub; IDM; chill-out; electronica
- Years active: 1988–present
- Labels: Big Life; Island; Badorb.com; Kompakt; Malicious Damage; Mercury; MCA; Cooking Vinyl
- Members: Alex Paterson; Michael Rendall
- Past members: Jimmy Cauty; Kris Weston; Andy Falconer; Andy Hughes; Simon Phillips; Nick Burton; Dom Beken; Thomas Fehlmann
- Website: theorb.com

The Orb are an English electronic music group founded in 1988 by Alex Paterson and Jimmy Cauty. Known for its psychedelic sound, the Orb developed a cult following among clubbers "coming down" from drug-induced highs. Its influential 1991 debut album The Orb's Adventures Beyond the Ultraworld pioneered the UK's nascent ambient house movement, while its UK chart-topping 1992 follow-up U.F.Orb represented the group's commercial peak.

Beginning as ambient and dub DJs in London, the Orb's early performances were inspired by electronic artists of the 1970s, especially Brian Eno, Cluster, and Kraftwerk. The Orb has maintained its signature science fiction aesthetic despite numerous personnel changes, including the departure of Cauty and members Kris Weston, Andy Falconer, Simon Phillips, Nick Burton, and Andy Hughes. Paterson has been the only permanent member, continuing to work as the Orb with Swiss-German producer Thomas Fehlmann and later with Martin "Youth" Glover, bassist of Killing Joke. Paterson's unauthorised use of other artists' works has led to multiple disputes, most notably with Rickie Lee Jones.

During its live shows in the 1990s, the Orb performed using digital audio tape machines optimised for live mixing and sampling before switching to laptops and other digital media. Featuring colourful light shows and psychedelic imagery, its performances often elicited comparisons to Pink Floyd, whose guitarist, David Gilmour, collaborated with the Orb on the 2010 album Metallic Spheres.

The Orb's 18th studio album, Buddhist Hipsters, was released on 10 October 2025 by Cooking Vinyl.

== History ==
=== 1988–1990: Paterson & Cauty ===
Alex Paterson began his music career in the early 1980s as a roadie for the post-punk rock band Killing Joke, for which his childhood friend Martin "Youth" Glover played bass. Having left Killing Joke's employ, in 1986 Paterson became an A&R man. Paterson and Youth shared a flat in Battersea and Jimmy Cauty, Youth's former bandmate from Brilliant, was a regular visitor. Paterson and Cauty began DJing and producing music together under the name "the Orb". Their first release was a 1988 acid house anthem track, "Tripping on Sunshine", released on Youth's compilation album Eternity Project One. In 1989, the Orb released the Kiss EP, a four-track EP based on samples from New York City's KISS FM. It was released on Paterson and Glover's new record label WAU! Mr. Modo Records, which they created to maintain financial independence from larger record labels. After spending a weekend of making what Paterson called "really shit drum sounds", the duo abandoned beat-heavy music and instead worked on music for after-hours listening by removing the percussion tracks. Paterson and Cauty began DJing in London and landed a deal for the Orb to play the chill out room at London nightclub Heaven. Resident DJ Paul Oakenfold brought in the duo as ambient DJs for his "The Land of Oz" event at Heaven. Though the Orb's Monday night performances had only several hardcore followers initially, its chill-out room act grew so popular over its six-month stay that the room was often packed with around 100 people. The Orb's performances became most popular among weary DJs and clubbers seeking solace from the loud, rhythmic music of the dance floor. The Orb built up melodies using multitrack recordings linked to multiple record decks and a mixer. The group incorporated many CDs, cassettes, and BBC sound effects, often accompanied by pieces of popular dance tracks such as "Sueño Latino". Though the Orb used a variety of samples, it avoided heavy rhythm and drums so that the intended ambient atmosphere was not disrupted. Most often, the group played dub and other chill-out music, which it described as ambient house for the E generation.

"Loving You" (1989)
Clip from the Orb's "Loving You" (which would later become "A Huge Ever Growing Brain ...") featuring a Minnie Riperton sound-alike singer.

"Little Fluffy Clouds" (1990)
Clip from the Orb's "Little Fluffy Clouds", featuring vocal samples of Rickie Lee Jones.

Throughout 1989 the Orb, along with Youth, developed a music production style that incorporated ambient music with a diverse array of samples and recordings. The British music press later labelled the music ambient house. The culmination of the group's musical work came toward the end of the same year when they recorded a session for John Peel on BBC Radio 1. The track, then known as "Loving You", was largely improvisational and featured a wealth of sound effects and samples from science fiction radio plays, nature sounds, and Minnie Riperton's "Lovin' You". For its release as a single on the record label Big Life, the Orb changed the title to "A Huge Ever Growing Pulsating Brain That Rules from the Centre of the Ultraworld". Upon the single's release, Riperton's management forced Big Life to remove the unlicensed Riperton sample, ensuring that only the initial first-week release of the single contained the original vocals of Minnie Riperton; subsequent pressings used vocals from a sound-alike. Despite its running time of 19 minutes, the sample-laden single reached No. 78 on the UK singles chart. Soon thereafter, the Orb were commissioned by Dave Stewart to remix his top-20 single "Lily Was Here". The group obliged and were soon offered several more remix jobs from artists including Erasure and System 7.

In 1990, Paterson and Cauty held several recording sessions at Cauty's studio, Trancentral. When offered an album deal by Big Life, the Orb found themselves at a crossroads: Cauty preferred that the Orb release their music through his KLF Communications label, whereas Paterson wanted to ensure that the group did not become a side-project of Cauty and Bill Drummond's KLF. Because of these issues, Cauty and Paterson split in April 1990, with Paterson keeping the name the Orb. As a result of the break-up, Cauty removed Paterson's contributions from the in-progress recordings and released the album as Space on KLF Communications. Also out of these sessions came the KLF album Chill Out, on which Reynolds (1999) and Prendergast (2003) report Paterson appeared in an uncredited role. In a 2011 interview with Magnetic Magazine, Alex Paterson corroborated his involvement and contribution to the Chill Out album and said he had in fact been "ripped off" by the KLF and notably Jimmy Cauty, stating:

KLF put the Chill Out album out, which was basically a bunch of my DJ sessions at Trancentral which I never got credited for. That was one of the major reasons why Jimi and I split up. It was becoming apparent to me that everything he said he had given me, he never gave me. That shaped quite a lot of things in my head. Never to be ripped off again, I suppose. Don't worry, I got ripped off again. But as Jimi said to me, you're never really famous until you've been ripped off.

Following the split, Paterson began working with Youth on the track "Little Fluffy Clouds". The group incorporated samples from Steve Reich's Electric Counterpoint. The signature of the piece centres around the repeated phrases sampled from the voice of singer/songwriter Rickie Lee Jones, her spaced-out childlike ramble taken from a promotional CD released by Geffen Records for her 1989 album, Flying Cowboys. In it she muses on the picturesque images of clouds from her Arizona childhood.

=== 1991–1994: Paterson & Weston ===
"Blue Room" (1992)
Clip from the Orb's near 40-minute version of "Blue Room", the longest single to chart in the United Kingdom.

In 1991, Paterson invited freelance studio engineer Andy Falconer to join the Orb. He was closely followed by studio engineer Kris "Thrash" Weston. Steve Hillage, who Paterson had met while DJing in London, also joined as a guitarist. Along with producer Thomas Fehlmann, the Orb completed several additional tracks for their first album, The Orb's Adventures Beyond the Ultraworld. At least six studios and twenty outside musicians were used during the three weeks of recording. Falconer's and Weston's technical abilities and Hillage's guitar work allowed the group to craft panoramic sounds portraying aspects of space travel, including the launch of Apollo 11. Adventures sold well in the United Kingdom and received praise for its balance of ambient music, house music, and sampling. Retrospectively, Adventures is considered ground-breaking for changing the way musicians view sampling and as a vital work for the genres of ambient and dance music. The completion of Adventures saw the departure of Andy Falconer, whose last contribution was to one of the Orb's Peel sessions. To promote the release of an edited single-disc version for an American release on Mercury Records, the Orb embarked on their first tour of the United States beginning in Phoenix, Arizona, in October 1991.

In late 1991 and early 1992, Paterson and Weston wrote their next single, "Blue Room". Assisting with the recording was bassist Jah Wobble, keyboardist Miquette Giraudy, and guitarist Hillage. Despite its playing time of almost 40 minutes, "Blue Room" entered the British charts at No. 12 and peaked at No. 8, making it the longest track to reach the charts. The Orb promoted this single with a "legendary avant-garde" performance on Top of the Pops where Patterson and Weston played a game of chess in space suits while footage of dolphins and an edited version of "Blue Room" ran in the background. In July 1992, U.F.Orb was released featuring "Blue Room" and, in the US release, the Orb's next single, "Assassin". Weston integrated his technical and creative expertise with Paterson's Eno-influenced ambience on U.F.Orb, combining "drum and bass rhythms" with "velvet keyboards" and "rippling synth lines". U.F.Orb reached No. 1 on the British album charts to the shock of critics, who were surprised that fans had embraced what journalists considered to be progressive rock. Despite the Orb's success, Paterson and Weston preferred to avoid personal publicity and instead allow their music to be the focus of attention. Because of this partial anonymity and the Orb's rotating membership, they are often recognised as more of a musical collective than a "band".

Over the next year and a half, Paterson and Weston continued to produce "new" material, and the Orb left Big Life to sign a deal with Island Records. Their first release on Island Records was the live album Live 93, which gathered highlights from their recent performances in Europe and Asia. It featured the live crew of Paterson, Weston, producers Nick Burton and Simon Phillips, as well as audio engineer Andy Hughes, who had stepped in previously when Weston had decided to stop touring. The Orb's first studio production on Island Records was Pomme Fritz, a chaotic EP noted for its heavy use of strange samples and its lack of conventional harmonies. Though Pomme Fritz reached No. 6 on the British charts, critics panned it as "doodling". Island Records "hated it" and "didn't understand it at all", according to Paterson. Soon after production finished on Pomme Fritz, Paterson, Weston, and Orb contributor Thomas Fehlmann joined with Robert Fripp to form the group FFWD as a side project. FFWD released a single self-titled album on Paterson's Inter-Modo label, which Fehlmann later described as "an Orb track which became so long that it became a whole album!". Due to this aimlessness, FFWD lacked an artistic goal and disbanded after a single release. Also in the summer of 1994 the Orb provided music for The Jupiter Collision, the BBC's brief info series about the Shoemaker-Levy comet. Soon after the release of FFWD in August 1994, Weston suddenly left the Orb. Paterson claimed that Weston's departure was due to his desire to have more control in the Orb. In an interview with i-D, Weston attributed the split to Paterson, saying that Paterson "didn't do his 50 per cent of the work". Paterson reaffirmed the status of the Orb saying, "The Orb is the Orb, and nothing can change that", and continued work with Hughes and Fehlmann.

=== 1995–2001: Paterson, Fehlmann & Hughes ===
Following Weston's departure from the Orb, Thomas Fehlmann joined as a full-time studio member, but did not always participate in live performances. Paterson, Hughes, and Fehlmann then finished producing the album Orbus Terrarum, on which Paterson and Weston had been working. Orbus Terrarum, released in 1995, featured more "earthbound" and "organic" sounds than their previous trippy science-fiction-themed music. Orbus Terrarum suffered, as Paterson described it, "a good kicking" at the hands of the British press, who described it as "generic" and a low point for Paterson's creativity. Orbus Terrarum alienated many of the group's fans, and reached only No. 20 on the British charts. American critics gave it great acclaim, including Rolling Stone who made it their album of the month, citing its symphonic flow coupled with the Orb's "uniquely British wit". After a long world tour, the Orb, with Andy Hughes and Steve Hillage, settled down to produce their next album, Orblivion—the process of which saw a return to their spacey sounds. Though Orblivion was recorded in May 1996, it was not released until almost a year later, due to Island Records' desire to promote it as a follow-up to U2's techno-rock album Pop. Orblivion sold well in Europe as well as the United States, where it reached the Billboard Top 200. The first Orblivion single, "Toxygene", was the highest-charting single by the Orb, reaching No. 4 in the United Kingdom on 8 February 1997. Despite high sales, Orblivion received a lukewarm reception from the British press. As with Orbus Terrarum, Orblivion was better received by American critics, including Rolling Stone, who praised its "contrast of chaos and euphony". Meanwhile, the stresses of touring sat heavily on Paterson; he considered retiring the Orb, but continued touring and producing. In 1997 the band sold their studio Joe's Garage to the Godfrey brothers of Morcheeba. That same year, they contributed a cover of "Jo the Waiter" to the Gary Numan tribute album Random.

Paterson and Fehlmann, along with usual collaborators Hughes, Nick Burton, and Phillips, wrote and produced Cydonia for a planned 1999 release. Featured on the album were appearances from Robert Fripp, John Roome (Witchman), and Fil Le Gonidec, one of the Orb's live performers. Singers Nina Walsh and Aki Omori appeared on two tracks each, providing vocals and co-writing lyrics with Paterson. Paterson felt that this new direction of songwriting for the Orb was more similar to the experimental work of Orbus Terrarum than to the techno-pop of Orblivion. Island Records was in a period of restructuring due to its recent purchase by Universal Music Group, and Cydonia was not released until 2001. Upon release, critics noted that Cydonia merged pop, trance, and ambient-dub music, which they felt to be a conglomeration of bland vocals and uninventive ambience that lacked the appeal of the Orb's earlier work. NME harshly described it as "a stillborn relic, flawed throughout by chronically stunted ambitions" and describing its only appropriate audience to be "old ravers" seeking nostalgia.

The Orb were generally regarded by the British press as past their prime and an "ambient dinosaur" out of place in the current dance music environment. After the release of Cydonia, Hughes left the group for undisclosed reasons, becoming "another acrimonious departure from the Orb" according to The Guardian.

=== 2001–2004: Paterson, Fehlmann & Phillips ===
Paterson's record label Badorb.com had only fourteen releases in its brief existence.

In 2001, Alex Paterson formed the record label Badorb.com as an outlet for Orb members' side projects. To promote both Badorb.com and Cydonia, the Orb toured internationally, including their first visit to the United States in four years. NME described the Orb's tour as "charming" and that they were "freed from the Floydian pretensions that dogged the band throughout the mid-'90s".

The Orb, now composed of Paterson, Phillips, and Fehlmann, with guest John Roome, accepted an invitation to join the Area:One concert tour with Moby, Paul Oakenfold, New Order and other alternative and electronic artists. Though the Orb were paired with more mainstream artists during the tour such as Incubus, Paterson and Fehlmann made their next releases a series of several low-key EPs for German label Kompakt in 2002. The Orb found critical success on Kompakt; but Badorb.com collapsed soon after releasing the compilation Bless You. Badorb.com had released fourteen records over the course of fourteen months from artists including Guy Pratt (Conduit), Ayumi Hamasaki, and Takayuki Shiraishi, as well as the Orb's three-track Daleth of Elphame EP. Though Badorb.com was an internet-based record label, they sold only vinyl releases (with one exception, the Orb EP), which Paterson later remarked was a poor idea because "not many people ... have record players".

"Aftermath" (2004)
Featuring rapping by MC Soom-T, "Aftermath" showcased the Orb's willingness to experiment with other genres on Bicycles & Tricycles.

Though their musical style had changed somewhat since the 1990s, the Orb continued to use their odd synthetic sounds on 2004's Bicycles & Tricycles, to mixed reviews. The Daily Telegraph praised Bicycles & Tricycles as being "inclusive, exploratory, and an enjoyable journey"; other publications dismissed it as "stoner dub" and irrelevant to current electronic music. Like Cydonia, Bicycles & Tricycles featured vocals, including rapper MC Soom-T who added a hip-hop contribution to the album. The Orb left Island Records and released the album on Cooking Vinyl and Sanctuary Records. To promote the album, the band began a UK tour with dub artist Mad Professor. Though the Orb still pulled in large crowds, The Guardian noted that they lacked the intensity found in their earlier performances.

=== 2004–2007: Paterson & Fehlmann, the Transit Kings ===
After two more EPs on Kompakt, the Orb (now composed of only Paterson and Fehlmann) released Okie Dokie It's the Orb on Kompakt, which featured new material in addition to tweaked versions of their previous Kompakt output. By this stage, AllMusic observed, Thomas Fehlmann had become the primary creative figure in the Orb, "inhibiting Alex Paterson's whimsical impulses". Because of this, Okie Dokie was considerably more focused and less "goofy" than Cydonia and Bicycles & Tricycles. Fehlmann's trademark hypnotic loops and delays made him the centre of Okie Dokie production and, according to Pitchfork, made it "difficult to say where [Paterson] is in the picture". The Orb's releases with Kompakt gained them back much of their musical credibility with the press and showed that they could "age gracefully".

In August 2006, the founders of the Orb—Paterson and Cauty—released Living in a Giant Candle Winking at God, their debut album as the Transit Kings with Guy Pratt and Pratt's associate, Dom Beken. The album featured appearances from Smiths' guitarist Johnny Marr and comedian Simon Day. Beken described Living in a Giant Candle Winking at God as "self-consciously musically written and less sample-based" compared to the members' previous work. Living had been in production since 2001, but due to members' other obligations, it was delayed for several years. The album received mixed critical reactions; The Times called it "Orb-lite" and proclaimed it to be "Deep Forest-style sludge". After the album's release, Cauty left the Transit Kings on "extended leave", leaving the project in indefinite limbo, and Beken joined the Orb for a period. Paterson and Beken reunited in 2008 as High Frequency Bandwidth, an ambient hip-hop group on the Malicious Damage label.

=== 2007–present ===
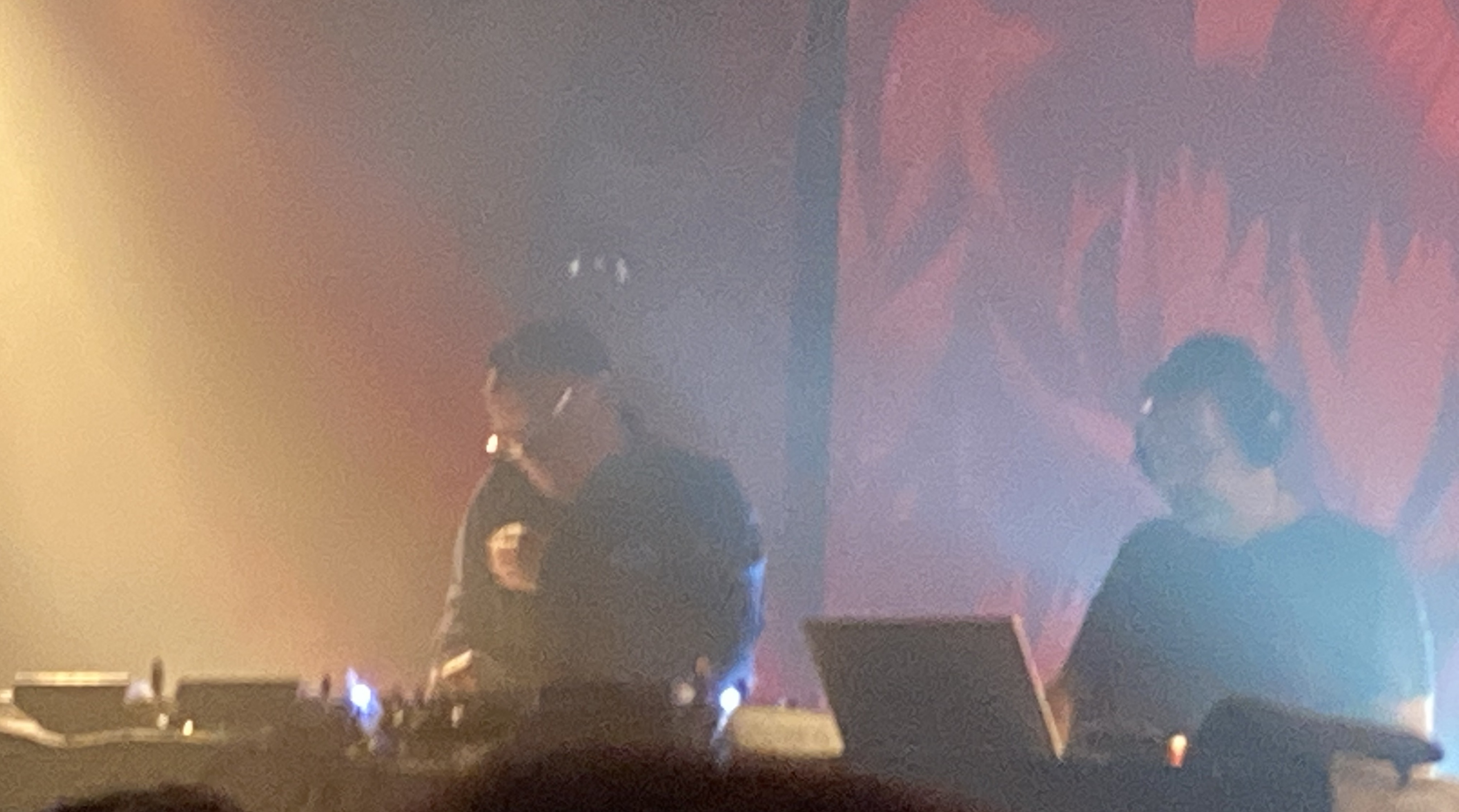
The Orb live in Cork, Ireland, October 2025

The Orb's next studio album, The Dream, was released in Japan in 2007 and the following year in the United States and United Kingdom. Fehlmann is absent on The Dream and Paterson was instead reunited with Youth and joined by Tim Bran of Dreadzone. The album saw a return to the Orb's sounds of the early 1990s, with peculiar vocals and playful samples. The Orb also brought in jazz and house music singer Juliet Roberts and guitarist Steve Hillage.

After the July 2006 re-release of The Orb's Adventures Beyond the Ultraworld 3-CD Deluxe Edition, 2007 and 2008 saw releases of expanded 2-CD editions of the band's subsequent regular studio records: U.F.Orb, Pomme Fritz EP, Orbus Terrarum, Orblivion and Cydonia. In late 2008 a double-cd compilation of BBC Radio 1 sessions called The Orb: Complete BBC Sessions 1989–2001 was released.

In May 2009, the British Malicious Damage Records (run by the members of Killing Joke) announced the release of the Orb's ninth regular studio album Baghdad Batteries (Orbsessions Volume III) on 11 September 2009. A reunification of Paterson and long-term collaborator Thomas Fehlmann who last worked together on Okie Dokie It's the Orb on Kompakt, the album was promoted with a launch party with Paterson and Fehlmann performing the whole album live at The-Situation Modern in Clapham, England on 10 September. A track "Chocolate Fingers" was uploaded onto the label's MySpace profile. Unlike the first 2 albums in the Orbsessions series, which consisted of archive recordings, Baghdad Batteries comprised brand new material recorded at Fehlmann's Berlin studio.

In March 2010, Internet station Dandelion Radio broadcast a seventeen and a half-minute long Orb session track by Paterson and Fehlmann on the Andrew Morrison show. This new track was titled "Battersea Bunches" and was a remixed version of the soundtrack to a short movie of the same title by Mike Coles and Alex Paterson—a film installation to be seen at London's Battersea Power Station on 1 June 2010 as part of an evening of art and music. The film and its soundtrack (together with remixes) were later released as the CD/DVD album C Batter C on 11 November 2011.

In mid-2010, Alex Paterson teamed up with Youth to compile a retrospective compilation album of tracks from the WAU! Mr Modo label. The album titled Impossible Oddities was released on CD and double Vinyl on 25 October 2010 via Year Zero records.

The Orb released the Metallic Spheres album in October 2010, featuring David Gilmour of Pink Floyd. It was released by Columbia Records.

In 2011, Alex Paterson teamed up with producer Gaudi and vocalist Chester Taylor for the creation of their experimental and ongoing collaborative project SCREEN, releasing the album We are Screen by Malicious Damage Records. In 2012, the Orb worked with dub musician Lee "Scratch" Perry to produce a reggae-infused album titled The Orbserver in the Star House, which was recorded in Berlin over a period of several months and features the single "Golden Clouds". The title song was based on an earlier version of Little Fluffy Clouds, with the lyrics rewritten by Perry reflecting his childhood in Jamaica and the property Golden Clouds near his home.

In 2013, the Orb performed with the Kakatsisi drummers of Ghana on the West Holts stage at Glastonbury Festival.

On 22 June 2018, the Orb released their fifteenth studio album, No Sounds Are Out of Bounds. During 2019, the Orb have been touring with a 30th anniversary tour, performed by Alex Paterson and London based producer/sound engineer Michael Rendall.

The Orb released their sixteenth studio album, Abolition of the Royal Familia, on 27 March 2020. It includes contributions from Youth, Roger Eno, Gaudi, David Harrow and Steve Hillage and Miquette Giraudy (System 7).

On 28 April 2023, The Orb released their seventeenth album, Prism, on the Cooking Vinyl label.

The Orb collaborated with Chocolate Hills to produce the latter's second album, Yarns From The Cholocate Triangle, released 16 June 2023.

On 10 October 2025 the Orb released their eighteenth studio album, Buddhist Hipsters, on Cooking Vinyl featuring collabarations with Roger Eno, Youth, Steve Hillage & Miquette Giraudy, Andy Falconer, Violeta Vicci, Paul Ferguson, Andy Cain, Rrome Alone and Eric Von Skywalker.

== Artistry ==
=== Musical style and influences ===
Andy Beta of Pitchfork wrote: "The Orb have always been mad hatters, tinkering with genre boundaries and aural expectations; they're heretics who explore the borders of house music, progressive, and ambient. Whether pushing the physical limits on what constitutes a single or dropping a fuzzy cover of the Stooges' "No Fun" during an otherwise chill Peel Session, Dr. Alex Paterson and his cohorts can soothe and startle in equal measure."

The Orb's members have drawn from an assortment of influences in their music. The Orb's central figure, Alex Paterson, had early musical tastes and influences that included King Tubby, Alice Cooper, Prince, Kraftwerk, and T.Rex. Among these, Paterson cites Kraftwerk as one of the most important, claiming they created the foundation from which all modern dance music has been built. While in Brixton with Martin Glover as a teenager, Paterson was also exposed to a large amount of reggae music, such as The Mighty Diamonds, The Abyssinians, and Bob Marley. The reggae influence on Paterson and the Orb can readily be heard in tracks such as the single "Perpetual Dawn" and U.F.Orb's "Towers of Dub". The earliest ambient influences of the Orb came in 1979 during Paterson's roadie days with Killing Joke. While with the band in Neuss, Paterson listened to Brian Eno's Music for Films while on LSD and watched "the Ruhr steel works explode in the distance", noting that "[t]he scene seemed to be taking place in the music as well". The same night, Paterson was also inspired while listening to Cluster's Grosses Wasser and found that the steel works' "huge metal arms were crushing molten rocks in time to the music", which was something he'd "never seen, or heard, anything like it before". Along with Cluster and Kraftwerk, Paterson was also influenced by other German experimental music from Can and composer Karlheinz Stockhausen. Modulations calls Paterson's music a "maximal" version of Brian Eno's "minimal" ambience, though according to Paterson, Eno resents Paterson's use of his music as an influence.

The Orb have often been described as "The Pink Floyd of the Nineties", but Paterson has stated that their music is more influenced by experimental electronic music than progressive rock of the 1970s. He has noted though that the Pink Floyd album Meddle was influential to him as a child in the 1970s. The psychedelic prog-rock similarities have led critics to describe the Orb as hippie revivalists; Paterson has strongly rejected the tag, claiming that even as a youth, he was "one of those punks who hated hippies".

During production of Cydonia and Bicycles & Tricycles, Paterson's biggest influences were drum and bass and trip hop music, as seen on the tracks "Ghostdancing", "Thursday's Keeper", and "Aftermath". The Orb's more recent influences consist largely of German techno producers, such as Triola, who were inspired by the Orb's earlier work. Paterson cites the music of Kompakt as one of his primary modern influences and claims it to be among the best modern ambient music.

=== Imagery and themes ===
Imagery has always been an important part of the Orb's persona. This is most prominent during live performances, where they often project surreal images against onstage screens. Common images include morphing faces, futuristic cityscapes, and aliens. They have long associated their act with absurd symbology with images such as floating pigs. This has carried over to their music videos, most of which are spacy, brightly coloured montages of surreal images including astronauts, clouds, and neon dolphins. Because of their use of psychedelic images at shows, the Orb's shows are frequently compared to those of Pink Floyd, who also used in-show imagery and films. Paterson cites Godfrey Reggio's and Philip Glass's film Koyaanisqatsi as a primary influence to their concert imagery.

The Orb's album art features much of the same imagery as their live act. Graphic design group The Designers Republic created the cover art for the earlier work, including Adventures Beyond the Ultraworld, U.F.Orb, and the singles from those two albums. For their next album, the Orb poked fun at their Pink Floyd comparisons with the cover of Live 93 featuring a floating stuffed sheep over the Battersea Power Station, which had appeared on the cover of Pink Floyd's Animals. The artwork found in Badorb.com releases was similar to the Orb's odd artwork of the mid-1990s, as it was stylistically similar and contained little writing.

Some of the more prominent motifs in the Orb's work are outer space and science fiction, including alien visitations, space flight, and mind control. These have included the use of samples from serious sources such as NASA transmissions to comedic clips from films like Woody Allen's Sleeper, from which the group also took their name. U.F.Orb especially expressed a fascination with alien life with its bizarre sound samples and in the album's title itself. The title of its most popular single, "Blue Room", is a reference to the supposed Blue Room of Wright-Patterson Air Force Base, which was investigated as a possible UFO evidence holding room. Their 2001 album is named after the Cydonia Mensae region of Mars. Due to Paterson's focus on science fiction and astronomical phenomena, The Guardian described Paterson as "pop [music]'s primary spokesperson on aliens".

== Techniques, technology, live performances ==
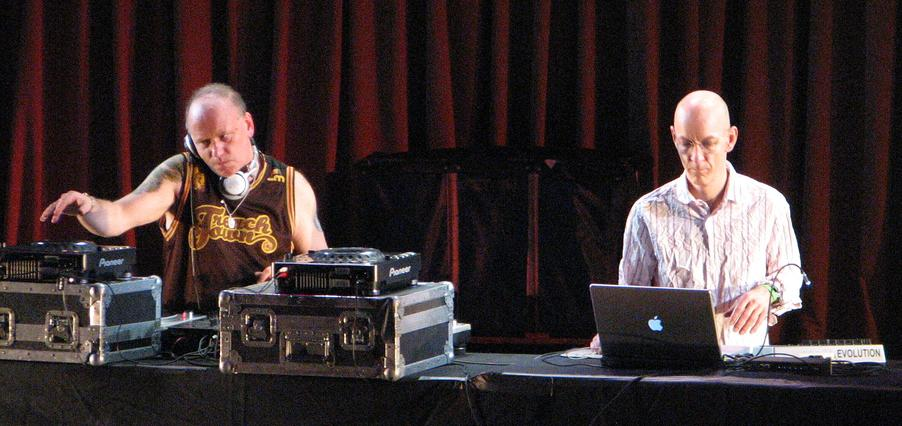
Paterson and Fehlmann at a 2006 performance at the Walt Disney Concert Hall

In the Orb's early DJ events in the 1980s, Paterson and Cauty performed with three record decks, a cassette player, and a CD player all of which were mixed through an Akai 12-track mixer. They used their equipment to harmonise recorded music and sound effect samples into an "endless sound continuum" for audiences of worn-out dancers. Even after the Orb began producing original material, they kept the same sample-heavy model for live acts by spontaneously integrating obscure samples into their pre-recorded tracks. During promotional tours for Adventures Beyond the Ultraworld and U.F.Orb, they performed using a digital audio tape machine and experimented with other media sources such as dubplates. The tape machines held individual chords, rhythms, and basslines for each composition, allowing the Orb to reprocess them and mimic the act of DJing. Members could then easily improvise with these samples and manipulate them using sound effect racks. Often, the Orb had a live musician accompanying them, such as Steve Hillage on guitar. Their shows in the early 1990s would often be three hours of semi-improvised, continuous music featuring a wealth of triggered samples, voices, and pre-recorded tracks which were barely identifiable as the original piece.

The Orb began performing regularly at the Brixton Academy in the early 1990s, where they used the high ceilings and large space for their "well-suited amorphous sound", frequently performing their newest and more experimental pieces there. Andy Hughes took Weston's place at live performances after the 1993 tour, though Weston did reappear for the Orb's concert at the rainy Woodstock '94. The Orb played for late night raves on the first two nights of Woodstock '94 in addition to artists including Aphex Twin, Orbital, and Deee-Lite. The next year, the Orb's touring group consisted of Paterson, Hughes, Nick Burton on drums, and Simon Phillips on bass. This live setup created a "cacophony" of "gigantic, swarming sounds". Though the Orb's performances use much onstage equipment and many props, Paterson prefers to present them as "a non-centralised figure of amusement on stage".

The Orb used ADAT recorders for performances from 1993 to 2001 and utilised large 48-track decks, which Paterson described as being a "studio onstage". They hooked synthesisers, such as the ARP 2600, to MIDI interfaces to recreate specific sounds that appeared on their albums. The Orb's methods of studio music creation changed as well. For more recent albums such as Cydonia, they used inexpensive equipment such as Korg's Electribe products, which Paterson described as employing more of a "bedroom techno" approach. Despite their use of laptops during performances and in-studio computers, Paterson says that he still cherishes vinyl and does not find purchasing CDs or downloading music to be nearly as satisfying.

=== Sampling and remixing ===
One of the Orb's most notable contributions to electronic music is their idea of blurring the distinction between sampling and remixing. Albums such as Pomme Fritz, though released as a piece of original work, consist largely of manipulated samples. Conversely, the Orb's remixes typically use only small sections of the original track, most notably in the case of their single "Toxygene". "Toxygene" was originally commissioned as a remix of Jean Michel Jarre's "Oxygene 8" from Oxygene 7-13. The Orb "obliterated it" and reassembled only a few fragments for their remix, much to the chagrin of Jarre, who reportedly refused to release it; The Orb released the track themselves under the name "Toxygene", which further irritated Jarre, to whom Paterson retorted "The French are always five years behind us, anyway." In statements made after the release of "Toxygene", Jarre denied that he rejected the original remix because of disliking it.

Other artists have become agitated due to the Orb sampling their work, though Paterson jokingly suggests that "[t]hey don't know the half of it." Paterson says that he finds a "beauty" and a "cleverness" with slipping unlicensed samples into compositions without anyone recognizing it. Even though fans often try to guess the origins of many of the samples, Paterson states that they are rarely correct and that they would "die" if they discovered, for example, where the drums on "Little Fluffy Clouds" originated from. He has said that record labels have cautioned him, "Don't tell anyone where you got your samples until we get them cleared!".

"Toxygene" (1997)
Clip from "Toxygene", the Orb's controversial pseudo-remix of Jean Michel Jarre's "Oxygene 8".

The Orb have used a wide variety of audio clips from sources ranging from McCarthy era speeches to prank phone calls by Victor Lewis-Smith to David Thewlis' apocalypse-driven rant from the film Naked. Paterson obtains many samples from recording TV and radio for hours at a time and picking out his favourite clips. He and other members of the Orb record nature sounds for use on albums, especially FFWD and Orbus Terrarum. The Orb's combination of ambient music and sampling from lower fidelity audio sources often creates a "fuzzy texture" in the sound quality, depersonalising the Orb's music. The Orb are lauded for their "Monty Python-esque levity" in their use of audio samples, though NME asserts that Paterson "sabotage[s] his majestic soundscapes" with "irritatingly zany" sounds.

The Orb has been a prolific remixing team, having completed over 80 commissioned remixes since 1989. Even during periods of label conflict and contractual limbo, the Orb found steady work remixing for artists including Depeche Mode, Lisa Stansfield, and Front 242. The Orb's remixes from the early and mid-1990s feature a large number of comical samples, Progressive-Sounds describe them as "ahead of their time" and NME notes them as "not entirely incompatible with contemporary chilling". Some pieces, such as their Bee Gees cover collaboration with Robbie Williams, received criticism for being "beyond a joke" for their use of strange noises. The Orb's remix of Nine Inch Nails' "The Perfect Drug", too, was described as "silly", as they made it sound like Trent Reznor was "drowning in his bathtub". Though Paterson maintains that much of the Orb's remix work is done to support other artists, he admits some of their remixes for major artists were performed so they could "pay the bills".

== Band members ==
Current members

- Alex Paterson (1988–present)
- Michael Rendall (2018–present)

Former members

- Jimmy Cauty (1988–1990)
- Andy Falconer (1990–1991)
- Kris Weston (1990–1994)
- Thomas Fehlmann (1994–2017)
- Andy Hughes (1994–2001)
- Simon Phillips (2001–2004)

== Discography ==
- The Orb's Adventures Beyond the Ultraworld (1991)
- U.F.Orb (1992)
- Orbus Terrarum (1995)
- Orblivion (1997)
- Cydonia (2001)
- Bicycles & Tricycles (2004)
- Okie Dokie It's the Orb on Kompakt (2005)
- The Dream (2007)
- Baghdad Batteries (Orbsessions Volume III) (2009)
- Metallic Spheres (2010) (with David Gilmour)
- The Orbserver in the Star House (2012)
- More Tales from the Orbservatory (2013)
- Moonbuilding 2703 AD (2015)
- COW / Chill Out, World! (2016)
- No Sounds Are Out of Bounds (2018)
- Abolition of the Royal Familia (2020)
- Prism (2023)
- Buddhist Hipsters (2025)
