= Ambient house =

Subgenre of house music

- Other names: New Age house
- Stylistic origins: Ambient; house; downtempo; new age; acid house; electro
- Cultural origins: Late 1980s, United Kingdom and Japan
- Derivative forms: Ambient techno; trance; IDM; psybient

Other topics
- Ambient music artists, chill-out music

Ambient house is a downtempo subgenre of house music that first emerged in the late 1980s, combining elements of acid house and ambient music. The genre developed in chill-out rooms and specialist clubs as part of the UK's dance music scene. It was most prominently pioneered by the Orb and the KLF, along with artists such as Global Communication, Irresistible Force, Youth, and 808 State. The term was used vaguely, and eventually fell out of favor as more specific subgenres were recognized.

== Genre ==
AllMusic describes "ambient house" as an "early categorical marker" for music "appropriating certain primary elements of acid house music – midtempo, four-on-the-floor beats; synth pads and strings; soaring vocal samples – used in a dreamier, more atmospheric fashion". Bloomsbury Encyclopedia of Popular Music of the World noted common elements: repeated synthesizer arpeggios that are gradually modulated; reverbed snippets of dialogue from film, radio, or relaxation tapes; and samples of other musical works drifting in and out of the mix.

Ambient house is sometimes conflated with "chill-out", and AllMusic acknowledges that the term "ambient house" is now rarely used, replaced by a morass of more specific genres and terms.

== History ==
=== Origins ===
Ambient house was, in the words of John Bush of AllMusic, "virtually invented" by UK band the Orb – Alex Paterson and Jimmy Cauty – during The Land of Oz events at the night-club Heaven, while Dom Phillips at Mixmag has said the Orb "kickstarted the whole ambient business". Neil McCormick has similarly credited Cauty and Paterson with inventing the genre, in The Daily Telegraph. In 1989, Paul Oakenfold ran the acid house night at Heaven, and Paterson ran a chill-out counterpart in the White Room with Cauty and Youth. There, Paterson spun Brian Eno, Pink Floyd, and 10CC songs at low volume and accompanied them with multiscreen video projections. Around the same time, in the East End of London, so-called spacetime parties were held at Cable Street. These parties, organized by Jonah Sharp, were designed to encourage conversation rather than dance, and featured Mixmaster Morris (also known as the Irresistible Force), another pioneer of the genre.

"Loving You" (1989)
Sample from The Orb's "Loving You" (which would later become "A Huge Ever Growing Brain...") featuring the vocals of Minnie Riperton.

The Orb released the twenty-minute track "A Huge Ever Growing Pulsating Brain That Rules from the Centre of the Ultraworld" as a single in October 1989, making it to the UK singles chart at No. 78. The track featured "bright, translucent sounds" and "tinkl[ing]" keyboards, as well as heavily sampling Minnie Riperton's "Lovin' You". Other early ambient house records included "Sueño Latino" (1989) by the Italian group of the same name (based on Manuel Gottsching's 1984 album E2-E4), "Pacific State" (1989) by 808 State, "Flotation" (1990) by the Grid, "Paradise" (1989) by Quadrophenia, "Journeys Into Rhythm" (1989) by Audio One, and "Natural Thing" (1990) by Innocence.

=== Commercial peak ===
In February 1990, Cauty's other band the KLF, a partnership with Bill Drummond, released the album Chill Out: "one of the initial works in the ambient house canon" and "essential" according to John Bush at AllMusic, "one of the most influential records in ambient house music" according to Pitchfork, and an album with which the KLF were "claiming pre-eminence in the ambient house field" (Ira Robbins of Trouser Press). In a press release for Chill Out, Scott Piering claimed that the term "ambient house" had been invented "off-the-cuff" by the KLF. After leaving the Orb in April 1990, Cauty finished work on Space, which was originally intended to be the Orb's debut album, and Paterson's Orb went on to create the single "Little Fluffy Clouds" with Youth, both important works of ambient house. The KLF retired from the music industry in 1992, In 1991, the Orb released the album The Orb's Adventures Beyond the Ultraworld, featuring both of their previous singles. Combining Moog synthesizers with religious chorales and audio clips of the Apollo 11 rocket launch, the Orb popularized the "spacy" sound of ambient house. The album would influence subsequent dub influenced electronic music.

Ambient house became a label for artists beyond the KLF and the Orb, including Irresistible Force, the Future Sound of London, and Orbital. Ultramarine's 1991 album Every Man and Woman is a Star was also lumped in with the chillout/ambient house scene of the Orb and the KLF. Other ambient house recordings emerged by artists such as the Grid ("Flotation" in 1990), Interplay ("Synthesis" in 1991), and the Future Sound of London ("Papua New Guinea" in 1991). In 1992, the Orb released the single "Blue Room" which was to become their most successful, reaching eighth place in the UK singles chart. At forty minutes, it was the longest single to reach the UK charts. An edited form of it appeared on the Orb album U.F.Orb later that year. U.F.Orb reached No. 1 in the UK albums chart; AllMusic called it "the commercial and artistic peak of the ambient-house movement." In the years after the release of their live album, Live 93, the Orb largely stopped their ambient-house music production, instead concentrating on producing more "metallic" music.

In 1994, Global Communication released their largely beat-free album 76:14; AllMusic called it "a notable high point of the ambient house movement." Slant Magazine called it "one of several universally celebrated ambient house records," and labeled each track "its own spacey symphony, etched with ticking clocks, soft piano lines and tidal white noise."

== See also ==
- List of electronic music genres
