= Alex Paterson =

English musician (born 1959)

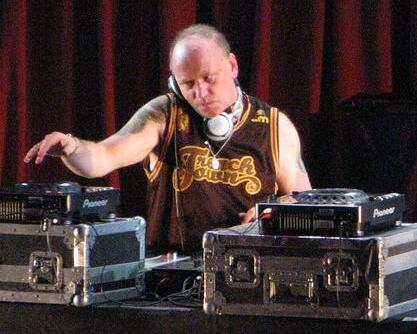
- Paterson at a 2006 performance with the Orb at the Walt Disney Concert Hall

Background information
- Also known as: Dr Alex Paterson
- Born: Duncan Alexander Robert Paterson; 15 October 1959 (age 66); Battersea, London, England
- Genres: Electronic; trip hop; dub; IDM
- Occupation: Musician
- Instruments: Keyboards; turntables; sampler; programming
- Member of: The Orb; Transit Kings; FFWD

Alex Paterson (also known as Dr Alex Paterson, born Duncan Alexander Robert Paterson; 15 October 1959) is an English musician and co-founder of ambient house group the Orb, in which he has worked since its inception in 1988.

== Life and work ==
Paterson attended private boarding school Kingham Hill School in Oxfordshire between 1970 and 1979, at the same time as Killing Joke bassist Martin "Youth" Glover. Paterson was a roadie for Killing Joke in the 1980s and later worked in the A&R department of E.G. Records, to whom the band were signed.

New York radio stations were a force driving his musical direction, especially the Chuck Chillout shows on 98.7 KISS FM. In the late 1970s Paterson sang for the band 'Bloodsport' while also DJing at Killing Joke gigs.

In 1989, Youth and Alex Paterson started the WAU! Mr. Modo label. Their early releases of a selection of industrial techno dubs and heavy sound system dubs from artists such as Napthali, Manasseh, Bim Sherman and Jah Warrior are long deleted and fetch high sums in private sales.

In 1990, Paterson's collaborations with his fellow Orb co-founder Jimmy Cauty ended, following Paterson's concerns about the Orb being perceived as a side-project of The KLF. Paterson retained the Orb name. More recently, Cauty and Paterson collaborated again, as Transit Kings. Paterson was also involved in FFWD, a collaboration with Kris Weston, Robert Fripp, and Thomas Fehlmann, and SCREEN alongside music producer Gaudi.

In 2021 Paterson started his own record label, Orbscure Recordings.

== Badorb.com ==
Badorb.com
- Founded: 2002
- Founder: Alex Paterson
- Distributor: -
- Country of origin: United Kingdom
- Official website: http://www.badorb.com/

Badorb.com was a record label created by Alex Paterson of the Orb in 2002. Though it was an internet label, its releases were vinyl only, which Paterson believed was the reason the label failed and closed in 2003. It had featured fourteen releases from artists including the Orb, S.E. Berlin and Ayumi Hamasaki.

Releases were:

- BOB 1 S.E. Berlin – Untitled (12")
- BOB 2 Ayumi Hamasaki – Monochrome (12")
- BOB 3 Autolump – Cupa T EP (12")
- BOB 4 Creature – Creature EP (12")
- BOB 4.5 Unknown Artist – Untitled (12")
- BOB 5 Multiverse – Hour of the Evil Eye EP (12")
- BOB 6 Electric Chairs – Barbie Girl EP (12")
- BOB 7 Prayer Box – Prayer Box EP (12")
- BOB 8 Fusionic – Fusionic EP (12")
- BOB 9 Loophead – Firefly (12")
- BOB 10 Conduit – Snowblind (12")
- BOB 11 Creature – Remixes (12")
- BOB 12 The Orb – Daleth of Elphame EP (12")
- BOB 12CDS The Orb – Daleth of Elphame EP (CD5")
- BOB 13 Cod Head Cod Head EP (12")
- BOB 14 Takayuki Shiraishi – Pieces EP (12")
- BOBCD 1 Various – Bless You (2xCD)

== Sources ==
- Prendergast, Mark (2003). The Ambient Century: From Mahler to Moby – The Evolution of Sound in the Electronic Age. Bloomsbury Publishing. pp. 407–412. ISBN 1-58234-323-3.
