= Pop (Gas album) =

Studio album by Gas
- Released: March 2000
- Genres: Ambient; new age
- Length: 65:42
- Label: Mille Plateaux MP CD 83
- Producer: Wolfgang Voigt

Gas chronology
Oktember (1999)	Pop (2000)	Nah und Fern (2008)

Pop is the fourth album by German producer Wolfgang Voigt's Gas project, released in March 2000 by Mille Plateaux. Influenced by LSD experiences in a German forest and wanting to create a "pop sound" for his subculture of German techno, Voigt's music as Gas is characterized by looping layered orchestral samples over a bass drum, with his early work having somber atmosphere. Pop departs from this ambient techno sound in favor of ambient music that utilizes brighter musical elements with an emphasis on texture.

Critical reception of Pop has been generally positive, with some publications listing Pop among the best albums of the 2000s. After the release of Pop, Voigt put Gas on hiatus for seventeen years until the release of Narkopop (2017), with Pop being reissued as part of the box sets Nah und Fern (2008) and Box (2016) during this time.

== Background and release ==
Wolfgang Voigt is an electronic music producer from Cologne, taking part in German techno scene since the 1990s. Voigt co-founded the record label Kompakt with Michael Mayer and Jürgen Paape and has released over 150 records under dozens of aliases, the most well-known being Gas. Voigt's work as Gas drew upon his LSD experiences occurred in the German forest Königsforst and his desire to create a "pop sound" within his subculture. The name comes from Voigt's self-description of this music, characterized by looping layers of sampled orchestral music over a bass drum, as being "gaseous". All four albums produced under this name prior to its hiatus were released by Mille Plateaux, a Frankfurt-based electronica offshoot of Force, Inc. These albums were Gas (1996), Zauberberg (1997), Königsforst (1999), and Pop.

Pop was released in March 2000 by Mille Plateaux. Afterward, Voigt put Gas on hiatus for seventeen years before returning to it to produce Narkopop (2017). Gas's projects went out of print for a few years before the release of the box set Nah und Fern in June 2008, which featured all four albums and received positive reviews. Pop would also be included in the box set Box alongside Zauberberg, Königsfort, and the 1999 EP Oktember. This box set was released on October 28, 2016, to critical acclaim.

== Composition ==
Pop is an ambient album with elements of new age that departs from ambient techno sound of Voigt's prior work as Gas. Gas's prior records sampled somber symphonic music over a low-frequency bass drum, while Pop, in contrast, layers brighter mid- and high-frequency loops, ranging in musical purpose such as rhythm and melody, with nuances that create a "steady and sustained ambience". Gas's signature bass drum only appears on two tracks. Pitchfork likened the album to an "exercise in sonic texture", operating without the "linear motion" of prior Gas records and emphasizing timbre over melody and rhythm.

The first two tracks are nearly identical, using reversed crash cymbals, synthesizer passages, and raining. The third track features a downcast melody. These three tracks share a synthesizer drone that alternates between two pitches, paired with electronic effects that evoke warmth. The fourth track is the first to use the bass drum, paired with a chiming effect that AllMusic described as "simultaneously lulling and disquieting". The fifth track uses a warm layered drone, with a progression reminiscent of the first track of William Basinski's The Disintegration Loops. The sixth track has an eerie tone evoked by its mixing of elements similar to the first three tracks. The seventh track is identical to the prior one, except paired with a bass drum.

== Reception and legacy ==
Professional ratings
Review scores
Source	Rating
AllMusic	5/5 stars
Alternative Press	5/5
Muzik	4/5
Pitchfork	9.0/10 (2000); 9.5/10 (2016)

Contemporaneous reviews were generally positive. AllMusic considered Pop "a crowning achievement for Voigt" and highlighted its rhythmic qualities and the nuances of its loops. Pitchfork found the album immersive and fascinating, recommending it to fans of Brian Eno's ambient projects and Aphex Twin's Selected Ambient Works Volume II. Muzik wished Pop were in the music charts rather than "the poisonous banality we're accustomed to", and Alternative Press called it Gas's best album. After the release of Pop, the Gas music project was put on hiatus for seventeen years until the release of Narkopop. During this time, Pop was the most popular of Gas's albums. in late 2001, Kompakt released the first entry of the annual Pop Ambient series, which, according to Pitchfork, was heavily influenced by the chime effect in the fourth track of Pop.

The release of Nah und Fern led to retrospective commentary on Pop. Critics generally considered Pop to be brighter than Voigt's other work as Gas. PopMatters found Pop's placement at the end of Nah und Fern made its "relative...popness" contrast with the other albums, making the melodies more appreciable. Joshua Meggitt of Resident Advisor considered the first two tracks of Pop to be "some of the most beautiful music [he had] heard". AllMusic felt the third track's melody and the fourth track's percussion were some of the few noticeable moments in the entire set. Pitchfork considered the album an "obvious entry point" for Gas's music. Three years after the release of Box, Spectrum Culture deemed Pop "one of ambient's supreme achievements in sound design."

Pitchfork ranked Pop the twelfth-best album of 2000, calling it "one of the year's most distinctive ambient releases". Pop was named among the best album of the 2000s by Resident Advisor, Pitchfork, and Fact. In 2016, Pitchfork ranked it the eleventh-best ambient album of all time, calling it "Gas' most enduringly habitable sound world".

== Tracklist ==
All tracks are written by Wolfgang Voigt.

Pop track listing
No.	Title	Title on digital version (Note: The songs are titled in this vein on all streaming platforms and Bandcamp.)	Length
1.	Untitled	Pop 1	5:13
2.	Untitled	Pop 2	8:38
3.	Untitled	Pop 3	7:27
4.	Untitled	Pop 4	9:31
5.	Untitled	Pop 5	10:52
6.	Untitled	Pop 6	9:24
7.	Untitled	Pop 7	14:37
Total length:			65:42
