= Snd (album) =

1996 studio album by Microstoria

_snd

Studio album by Microstoria
- Released: June 3, 1996
- Recorded: 1995–1996
- Genre: Electronic music; glitch; ambient; IDM
- Length: 37:37
- Label: Millie Plateaux; Thrill Jockey
- Producer: Microstoria

Microstoria chronology
init ding (1995)	_snd (1996)	Reprovisers (1997)

_snd is the second studio album by German experimental electronic duo Microstoria, consisting of Markus Popp of Oval and Jan St. Werner of Mouse on Mars. It was released on June 3, 1996.

== Background ==
Markus Popp and Jan St. Werner, the Microstoria members, have achieved recognition in the German electronic music scene. Popp was known for his project, Oval, releasing Systemisch (1994) and 94 Diskont (1995). Meanwhile, Werner was known for his duo, Mouse on Mars, releasing Vulvaland (1994) and Iaora Tahiti (1995).

== Composition ==
_snd was recorded in Berlin and Cologne, Germany. For the album, Popp and Werner used techniques of classical improvisation to compose material for mixing, being recorded with high-end digital gear, advanced editing, and a mix of physical and digital instruments. Unlike Microstoria's previous album, init ding, it explores contemporary digital software tools with a focus on minute musical details, done with sampled soundframes replayed in "slow motion." _snd ventures into unconventional territory, as it explores tone, texture, and abstract concepts.

== Critical reception ==
Professional ratings
Review scores
Source	Rating
AllMusic	3/5 stars
Pitchfork	8.3/10

_snd received mixed to favorable reviews from music critics. Sean Cooper of AllMusic gave the album 3 out of 5 stars. Despite criticizing the listening experience as difficult and considering it less abstract and rapid than the duo's previous album, init ding, he favors the subtle parallels being clearer as the album progresses in its composition.

In 2016, Pitchfork ranked _snd at number 44 on its list of "The 50 Best Ambient Albums of All Time" in 2016. With Marc Masters crediting it, "some of it is even hummable, if you give it enough time. But more importantly, snd is its own unique sonic world, an intoxicating journey made up of infinite single steps."

In 2024, Microstoria re-released a remastered version of init ding and _snd on 2xLP and streaming services through Thrill Jockey, including Bandcamp, to favorable reception. Daniel Bromfield of Pitchfork writes: "The interference that once lay on top of their tracks has become completely absorbed into the music; everything appears smudged, damaged or otherwise corroded, threaded between massive sub-bass subductions and high-end scrapes that test both listening habits and the limits of perception."

== Track listing ==
All tracks are written by Markus Popp and Jan St. Werner.

_snd track listing
No.	Title	Length
1.	"Sleep People / Network Down"	5:27
2.	"Teil Zeit"	5:40
3.	"Per Formal"	5:10
4.	"Feld 1"	4:47
5.	"Endless Summer NAMM"	4:39
6.	"Work Place"	5:07
7.	"Bpi"	3:57
8.	"Quit Not Save"	2:50
Total length:		37:37

== Personnel ==
- Markus Popp – performer
- Jan St. Werner – performer
- Kliem – cover art
- Bergmüller – cover art
