= Clicks & Cuts =

Compilation album by various artists
- Released: 25 January 2000
- Genre: Glitch; IDM
- Length: 130:49
- Label: Mille Plateaux

Clicks & Cuts series chronology
Clicks & Cuts (2000)	Clicks & Cuts, Vol. 2 (2001)

Professional ratings
Review scores
Source	Rating
AllMusic	4/5 stars
Alternative Press	5/5
Pitchfork	5.0/10

Clicks & Cuts (stylised as clicks_+_cuts) is a compilation album released by Mille Plateaux in 2000. It is the first volume in the label's Clicks & Cuts series of albums focusing on glitch music.

AllMusic describes the album as "an effort to both investigate and define the glitch aesthetic", then in its formative stages, as well as the style's "official genesis" and "the touchstone upon which later volumes and successive generations would build." In 2017, Pitchfork placed it at number 21 on its list of "The 50 Best IDM Albums of All Time".

== Track listing ==
Disc 1
No.	Title	Artist	Length
1.	"Kern"	Frank Bretschneider	5:02
2.	"Circa 1509"	Snd	5:06
3.	"Raute"	Farben	7:34
4.	"Synkopoint"	Vladislav Delay	10:41
5.	"Spaß"	Pole	6:29
6.	"Koilinen"	Pansonic	4:34
7.	"Prototype N."	Alva Noto	5:45
8.	"Shift"	Skist	5:49
9.	"Confused Bear Thrown into the Sea"	Stilluppsteypa	2:04
10.	"Clairvoyance"	Neina	6:20
11.	"Unstabile"	Sutekh	7:14
12.	"Pop"	Curd Duca	1:18

Disc 2
No.	Title	Artist	Length
1.	"Maschine"	Ester Brinkmann	8:04
2.	"Überall"	All	4:59
3.	"Strange Fruit"	Dettinger	5:22
4.	"These Few Minutes"	Autopoiesis	4:25
5.	"I Won't Lie"	Jake Mandell	2:33
6.	"Loads Early Like Normal"	Kit Clayton	3:52
7.	"(Esta Gran Humanidad Ha Dicho) ¡Ya Basta!"	Ultra Red	5:03
8.	"Matrix"	Reinhard Voigt	3:18
9.	"Rechannelled from Stereo"	Thomas Meinecke's Framus Waikiki	3:52
10.	"Sinecore"	Panacea	4:51
11.	"Sans Titre No. 2"	Ihan	3:56
12.	"Sonqizzmaster"	Kid606	6:10
13.	"Comp Vier"	Goem	6:29
