= Clicks & Cuts, Vol. 3 =

Compilation album by Various Artists
- Released: November 12, 2002
- Genre: Electronic
- Label: Mille Plateaux

Clicks & Cuts Series chronology
Clicks & Cuts, Vol. 2 (2001)	Clicks & Cuts, Vol. 3 (2002)	Clicks & Cuts, Vol. 4 (2004)

Professional ratings
Review scores
Source	Rating
Allmusic	link
Hybrid Magazine	(positive) link
Dusted Magazine	(negative) review
Pitchfork Media	72% link
Stylus Magazine	D+

Clicks & Cuts, Vol. 3 is the third volume in the Clicks & Cuts Series released by Mille Plateaux in 2002. The double album was released as an attempt to investigate and define the glitch music aesthetic in its early 2000s popularity.

== Track listing ==
Disc one
No.	Title	Artist	Length
1.	"Palo Alto"	snd	6:28
2.	"Risk"	Frank Bretschneider	4:29
3.	"Nerdy South"	Andreas Tilliander	5:21
4.	"Painkiller"	Mri3	5:21
5.	"Grace Under Fire"	Bizz.circuits	6:31
6.	"Kleine Hausmusik No. 16"	Geeez 'N' Gosh	6:53
7.	"Transrapid"	Alva Noto	4:40
8.	"Loving 'Ya"	Rob Acid	5:35
9.	"Disarm the Police"	Claudia Bonarellia	4:57
10.	"Difusse Daten in 5 Min"	Boris Polonski	3:41
11.	"Bubble Queen"	DAT Politics	5:13
12.	"Migrade"	Deru	3:41

Disc two
No.	Title	Artist	Length
1.	"Melt"	Luomo	4:55
2.	"Lovers Inn"	Antonelli Electr.	9:21
3.	"Onside"	Mikael Stavöstrand	5:54
4.	"Don't Quit Please"	Swayzak	6:49
5.	"Nine Blind Men (The Rankest Poison of Ignorance and Vice)"	Donnacha Costello, David Donohoe	5:50
6.	"Box"	Rechenzentrum	3:55
7.	"Rhizome"	Robin Judge	5:34
8.	"Pianos"	AGF	5:49
9.	"Brownwedding"	Tim Hecker	4:51
10.	"The Bakes in the Woods"	Ekkehard Ehlers	6:06
11.	"Holcimm Mmic"	Pomassl	5:09

== Personnel ==
- Peter Fey - mastering

== See also ==
- Mille Plateaux (Label)
- Glitch music
- Minimal techno
- Intelligent dance music
- Microhouse
