= Romantiq =

Studio album by Oval
- Released: 12 May 2023
- Genre: Ambient
- Length: 39:02
- Label: Thrill Jockey
- Producer: Markus Popp

Oval chronology
Ovidono (2021)	Romantiq (2023)

Romantiq is a studio album by Oval, a project of German record producer Markus Popp. It was released on 12 May 2023 through Thrill Jockey. It received generally favorable reviews from critics.

== Background ==
Romantiq is Oval's first studio album since Ovidono (2021). The album is based on an audio-visual collaborative project between Oval's Markus Popp and digital artist Robert Seidel for the opening of the German Romantic Museum in Frankfurt. The album draws inspiration from Romantic concepts and works. It incorporates flutes, pianos, trombones, and other period instruments, with digital manipulations. An opera singer's voice is sampled on the opening song, "Zauberwort". The album's cover art is a still image from video work by Seidel.

== Critical reception ==
Professional ratings
Aggregate scores
Source	Rating
Metacritic	80/100
Review scores
Source	Rating
AllMusic	3.5/5 stars
Mojo	4/5 stars
Pitchfork	7.4/10
Spectrum Culture	65%

According to the review aggregator Metacritic, Romantiq received "generally favorable reviews" based on a weighted average score of 80 out of 100 from 5 critic scores.

Paul Simpson of AllMusic stated, "Far removed from the exuberant maximalism of 2016's Popp and 2020's Scis, the album sounds closer to the electro-acoustic experiments of his sprawling 2010 comeback O, except this one feels like a more focused work instead of an unruly hard-drive dump." He added, "Romantiq's compositions manage to be soothing and reflective even as they restlessly pursue unknown sounds and feelings." Jeff Terich of Bandcamp Daily called the album "one of Popp's prettiest works, with the lines between its source material and its digital manipulations becoming more blurred than ever."

Stephen Worthy of Mojo stated, "Chords are distorted and jerked out of shape to create powerful percussive tools, but the pioneering glitch artist's music never tumbles into dissonance." Marc Weidenbaum of Pitchfork commented that Oval's instrumentation is "the result not merely of sampling, in the cut-and-paste sense, but of the highly precise reworking and simulation of musical instruments: the ability to craft what can seem real but are, at their core, digital implements."

== Track listing ==
All tracks are written by Markus Popp.

Romantiq track listing
No.	Title	Length
1.	"Zauberwort"	4:06
2.	"Rytmy"	3:12
3.	"Cresta"	3:34
4.	"Amethyst"	4:10
5.	"Wildwasser"	4:17
6.	"Glockenton"	3:38
7.	"Elektrin"	4:32
8.	"Okno"	4:48
9.	"Touha"	4:16
10.	"Lyriq"	2:34
Total length:		39:02

== Personnel ==
Credits adapted from liner notes.

- Markus Popp – arrangement, production
- Robert Seidel – artwork
