= Clicks & Cuts, Vol. 2 =

Compilation album by Various Artists
- Released: April 17, 2001
- Genre: Electronic
- Labels: Mille Plateaux; EFA

Clicks & Cuts Series chronology
Clicks & Cuts (2000)	Clicks & Cuts, Vol. 2 (2001)	Clicks & Cuts, Vol. 3 (2002)

Professional ratings
Review scores
Source	Rating
Allmusic	link
Pitchfork Media	8.3/10 link

Clicks & Cuts, Vol. 2 is the second volume in the Clicks & Cuts Series released by Mille Plateaux in 2001. The triple album was released as an attempt to investigate and define the glitch music aesthetic in its early 2000s popularity.

== Track listing ==
Disc one
No.	Title	Artist	Length
1.	"Circa 1666"	snd	6:19
2.	"The Videoage (re-edit)"	Farben	5:40
3.	"Vibetan"	Andreas Tilliander	4:35
4.	"Walking On Ice"	Frank Bretschneider	6:34
5.	"Neue Stadt (Skizze 8)"	alva.noto	4:14
6.	"Tanken Aterskapad"	Deltidseskapism	6:34
7.	"Pohdka"	Tomas Jirku	5:59
8.	"Kisonga"	Swayzak	6:49
9.	"012001"	Geez 'N' Gosh	4:57
10.	"Losing Touch"	Random Inc.	4:57
11.	"Academic"	Dan Abrams	6:10
12.	"Ranking + Rating"	März	5:05
Total length:			67:53

Disc two
No.	Title	Artist	Length
1.	"Holiday"	Vladislav Delay	6:17
2.	"While You Were Sleeping"	Kid606	6:50
3.	"Personal"	Reinhard Voigt	4:59
4.	"Repl"	Mikael Stavöstrand	4:49
5.	"The Animal Factory"	AUCH	5:21
6.	"Tight"	Rude Solo	4:12
7.	"Unintense"	Antonelli Electr.	5:41
8.	"All Music"	All	4:44
9.	"Drive"	Full Swing	4:29
10.	"0100"	Thomas Brinkmann	6:34
11.	"ri2.2"	Donnacha Costello	5:05
12.	"19xx"	Sutekh	4:36
Total length:			63:37

Disc three
No.	Title	Artist	Length
1.	"Inorganic Clarity"	Twerk	4:22
2.	"Megalodon"	Hakan Lidbo	5:59
3.	"Material Problem"	Kit Clayton	5:01
4.	"Tone Exploitation"	M^{2}	5:56
5.	"Menthol"	Fennesz	3:50
6.	"Keine Zähne"	Matmos	4:02
7.	"Clir"	Taylor Deupree	6:30
8.	"Filer"	Richard Charier	6:57
9.	"c5.1"	cyclo.	4:16
10.	"Arvio (long edit)"	Pansonic	6:49
11.	"Smoother Than Strange"	Station Rose	4:32
12.	"Hardwai"	DAT Politics	2:52
Total length:			61:06
