= Box (Gas album) =

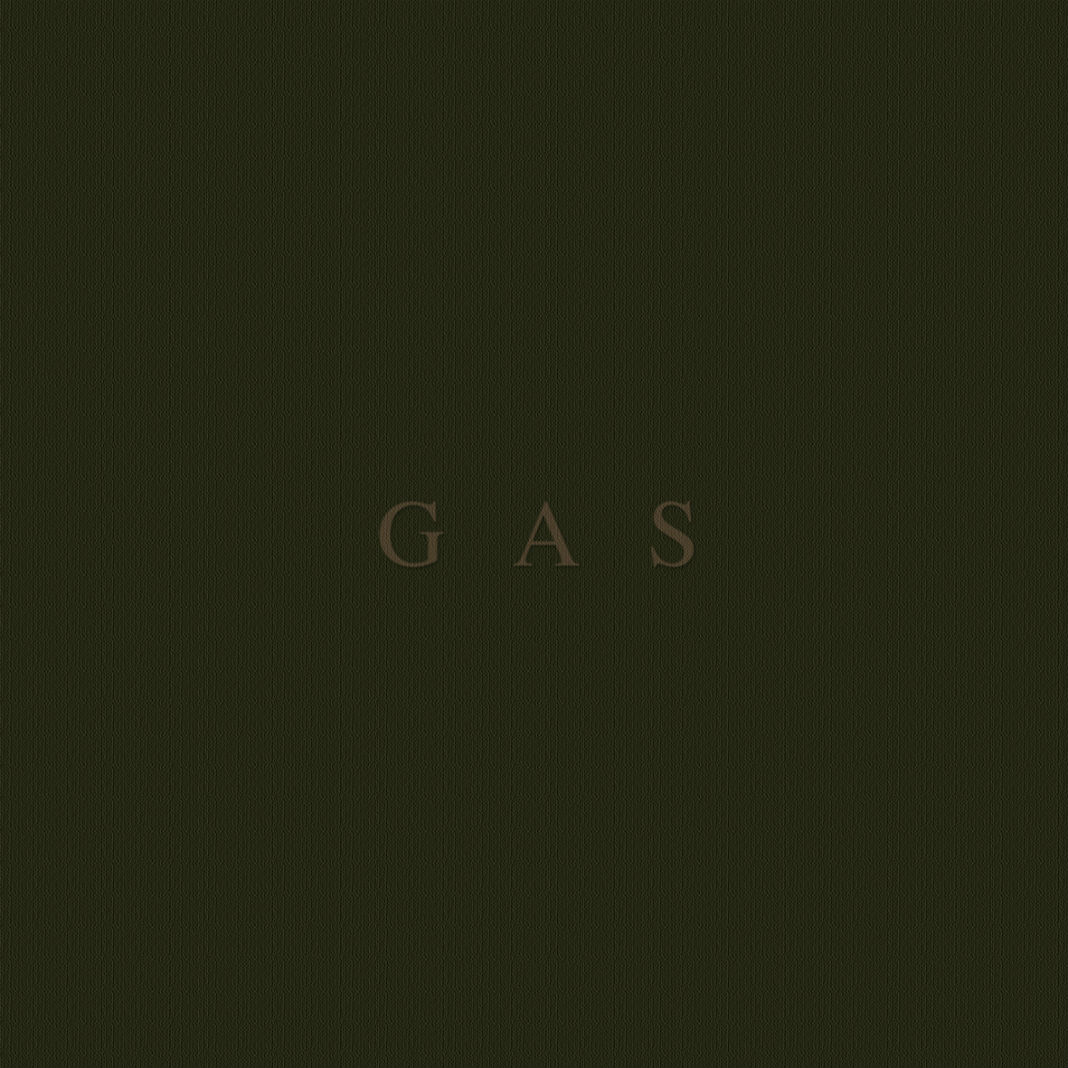

Box set by Gas
- Released: 28 October 2016
- Recorded: 1997–2000
- Genres: Ambient, ambient techno, psychedelia
- Length: 252:18
- Label: Kompakt
- Producer: Wolfgang Voigt

Gas chronology
Nah und Fern (2008)	Box (2016)	Narkopop (2017)

Professional ratings
Aggregate scores
Source	Rating
Metacritic	93/100
Review scores
Source	Rating
Exclaim!	7/10
Drowned in Sound	9/10
Mojo	4/5 stars
PopMatters	9/10
Pitchfork	9.5/10
Resident Advisor	5/5 stars
Uncut	8/10

Box is the second boxed set released by Wolfgang Voigt under his Gas alias. The album collects the compact disc versions of Zauberberg, Königsforst , Pop and Oktember. The album marked Voigt's return to the Gas project, with a new album, Narkopop, seeing release the year after Box. The boxed set consisted of 10 vinyl records (3 per album, 1 for Oktember) as well as 4 compact discs and an art book.

Box contains some differences between its contents and the previously issued versions of each album. Apart from overall remastering of the music, several songs appear in slightly longer versions. Notably, the A1 and D1 songs exclusive to the vinyl version of Königsforst were appended to the end of that disc, marking their first digital appearance. Also, the first song of Oktember was replaced with Tal '90, a piece released on Kompakt's compilation Pop Ambient 2002, as the original piece is identical to the first piece of Königsforst.

== Track listing ==
All tracks are written by Wolfgang Voigt.

Disc 1: Zauberberg
No.	Title	Length
1.	"Zauberberg 1"	11:45
2.	"Zauberberg 2"	14:15
3.	"Zauberberg 3"	14:31
4.	"Zauberberg 4"	5:56
5.	"Zauberberg 5"	8:00
6.	"Zauberberg 6"	11:02
7.	"Zauberberg 7"	11:59
Total length:		77:28

Disc 2: Königsforst
No.	Title	Length
1.	"Königsforst 1"	9:40
2.	"Königsforst 2"	13:58
3.	"Königsforst 3"	9:00
4.	"Königsforst 4"	6:32
5.	"Königsforst 5"	15:15
6.	"Königsforst 6"	10:21
7.	"Königsforst 7"	6:20
8.	"Königsforst 8"	7:11
Total length:		78:17

Disc 3: Pop
No.	Title	Length
1.	"Pop 1"	5:14
2.	"Pop 2"	8:35
3.	"Pop 3"	11:03
4.	"Pop 4"	9:54
5.	"Pop 5"	10:49
6.	"Pop 6"	9:20
7.	"Pop 7"	14:36
Total length:		69:31

Disc 4: Oktember
No.	Title	Length
1.	"Tal '90" (originally released under Voigt's alias Tal)	11:48
2.	"Oktember"	15:14
Total length:		27:02
