= Oktember =

EP by Gas
- Released: February 1999
- Genre: Ambient, ambient techno
- Length: 24:52
- Label: Mille Plateaux MP 063
- Producer: Wolfgang Voigt

Gas chronology
Königsforst (1998)	Oktember (1999)	Pop (2000)

Professional ratings
Review scores
Source	Rating
AllMusic	3/5 stars
Pitchfork	8.5/10

Oktember is the second EP by German musician Wolfgang Voigt's Gas project. It was released in February 1999 on the Mille Plateaux label.

"Oktember A" was later released as the first song on the CD pressing of Gas' third album Königsforst. Because of this, "Oktember A" was replaced with "Tal '90" (previously released as part of Kompakt's Pop Ambient 2002 compilation), as part of Oktember's inclusion in Gas' second boxed set, Box.

== Track listing ==
All tracks are written by Wolfgang Voigt

No.	Title	Length
1.	"Oktember A"	9:38
2.	"Oktember B"	15:14
Total length:		24:52
