= Nah und Fern =

Box set by Gas
- Released: 10 June 2008
- Recorded: 1996–2000
- Genres: Ambient, ambient techno, psychedelia
- Length: 264:04 (4CD box set); 54:24 (2LP vinyl)
- Label: Kompakt
- Producer: Wolfgang Voigt

Gas chronology
Pop (2000)	Nah und Fern (2008)	Gas (2008)

Professional ratings
Review scores
Source	Rating
AllMusic	4.5/5 stars
The A.V. Club	A
Drowned in Sound	9/10
PopMatters	9/10
Pitchfork	9.2/10
Prefix	9.5/10
Record Collector	5/5 stars
Resident Advisor	5/5 stars

Nah und Fern (English: Near and Far) is a boxed set collecting the four albums released by Wolfgang Voigt under the Gas alias between 1996 and 2000, released on 10 June 2008. An edited double vinyl edition was also released alongside the compact disc box set. Voigt noted around the time of release that, during remastering of his work, the music seemed to resist attempts at cleaning up the recordings, with the muffled or lo-fi nature of some elements of the music forming an integral part of the characteristic Gas sound. All four albums were originally released on the label Mille Plateaux. The box set reached #13 on the Billboard Top World Music Albums chart.

Nah und Fern contains some differences between its contents and the previously issued versions of each album. Apart from overall remastering of the music, several songs appear in slightly longer versions. Notably, tracks 1 and 3 on Gas are replaced by entirely new compositions, while track 4 is highly remixed. Track 6 of Zauberberg also appears in a much longer extended version.

A double vinyl LP version of Nah und Fern was also released, featuring one song each from Zauberberg, Königsforst and Pop, along with a new song, "Nah und Fern".

== Track listing ==
=== Compact disc box set ===
All tracks are written by Wolfgang Voigt.

Disc 1: Gas
No.	Title	Length
1.	Untitled	6:28
2.	Untitled	14:08
3.	Untitled	8:21
4.	Untitled	11:50
5.	Untitled	13:57
6.	Untitled	13:51
Total length:		67:35

Disc 2: Zauberberg
No.	Title	Length
1.	Untitled	7:46
2.	Untitled	14:10
3.	Untitled	12:47
4.	Untitled	6:00
5.	Untitled	8:01
6.	Untitled	11:05
7.	Untitled	9:12
Total length:		69:01

Disc 3: Königsforst
No.	Title	Length
1.	Untitled	9:49
2.	Untitled	13:56
3.	Untitled	9:01
4.	Untitled	6:32
5.	Untitled	15:19
6.	Untitled	10:20
Total length:		64:57

Disc 4: Pop
No.	Title	Length
1.	Untitled	5:30
2.	Untitled	8:36
3.	Untitled	7:26
4.	Untitled	9:28
5.	Untitled	10:51
6.	Untitled	9:18
7.	Untitled	15:02
Total length:		66:11

=== Vinyl pressing ===
All tracks are written by Wolfgang Voigt.

Side A
No.	Title	Length
1.	"Nah und Fern"	10:11
Total length:		10:11

Side B
No.	Title	Length
1.	"Zauberberg" (track 2 from Zauberberg)	14:05
Total length:		14:05

Side C
No.	Title	Length
1.	"Königsforst" (track 5 from Königsforst)	15:16
Total length:		15:16

Side D
No.	Title	Length
1.	"Pop" (track 7 from Pop)	14:52
Total length:		14:52
