= Modern (EP) =

EP by Gas
- Released: April 1995
- Genre: Techno
- Length: 29:21
- Label: Profan PRO 008
- Producer: Wolfgang Voigt

Gas chronology
Modern (1995)	Gas (1996)

Modern is Wolfgang Voigt's first release under the Gas alias. It is an EP, released in 1995 on the Profan label. Unlike later releases by Gas, Modern does not feature forest photography in the liner notes; and the songs are titled.

== Track listing ==
All tracks are written by Wolfgang Voigt.

No.	Title	Length
1.	"Heller"	7:40
2.	"Klang"	6:06
3.	"Roter"	9:17
4.	"Stern"	6:18
Total length:		29:21
