= Vinn =

Vinn may refer to:

== People ==
- Vello Vinn (born 1939) is an Estonian printmaker
- Olev Vinn (born 1971) is an Estonian paleobiologist

== Other uses ==
- Våg og vinn, Norwegian television program
