= Love, Inc. =

Love, Inc. may refer to:

- Love, Inc. (TV series), an American sitcom from 2005 to 2006
- Love Inc. (group), a Canadian Eurodance music group
- Wolfgang Voigt or Love Inc., a German electronic music DJ and producer
