= Popp =

Popp is a German surname. Notable people with the surname include:

- Adelheid Popp (1869–1939), Austrian feminist and socialist
- André Popp (1924–2014), French composer, arranger and screenwriter
- Angela C. Popp (born 1968), American director, screenwriter and songwriter
- Alexander Popp (born 1976), German tennis player
- Alexandra Popp (born 1991), German football player
- Bernard Ferdinand Popp (1917–2014), American Bishop of the Roman Catholic Church
- Bill Popp (1877–1909), American baseball player
- Cynthia J. Popp (born 1962), American television director and producer
- Deborah Ann Popp (born 1993), American actress
- Franz Josef Popp (1886–1954), co-founder of BMW
- Fritz Popp (born 1940), German football player
- Fritz-Albert Popp (1938–2018), German biophysicist
- Georg Popp (1861–1943), German chemist and a pioneer of the discipline of forensic science
- Harold Popp (1903-1969), American pharmacist, businessman, and politician
- Jim Popp (born 1964), manager of the Montreal Alouettes football club
- Julius Popp (born 1973), German artist
- Lothar Popp (1887–1980), German revolutionary
- Lucia Popp (1939–1993), Slovak opera singer
- Mișu Popp (1827–1892), Romanian painter and muralist
- Nathaniel (Popp) (born 1940), Romanian-American bishop
- Willian Popp (born 1994), Brazilian football player
- Wolfgang Popp (born 1959), German tennis player

== See also ==
- Popp (album), a 2016 studio album by Oval
- Carol Szathmari (1812–1887), called Carol Popp de Szathmary in Romanian; painter and photographer
- Pupp
- Pop (disambiguation)
