= Der Lange Marsch =

Studio album by Gas
- Released: 3 December 2021
- Length: 67:35
- Label: Kompakt

Gas chronology
Rausch (2018)	Der Lange Marsch (2021)

Der Lange Marsch is the seventh studio album by Gas, a project of German record producer Wolfgang Voigt. It was released on 3 December 2021 through Kompakt. It received universal acclaim from critics.

== Background ==
Gas is a project of German record producer Wolfgang Voigt. Der Lange Marsch is the first Gas album since Rausch (2018). The album's title is German for "the long march". The album was released on 3 December 2021 through Kompakt.

== Critical reception ==
Professional ratings
Aggregate scores
Source	Rating
Metacritic	81/100
Review scores
Source	Rating
AllMusic	4/5 stars
Mojo	4/5 stars
Pitchfork	6.6/10
PopMatters	8/10
Spectrum Culture	75%
Uncut	8/10

According to the review aggregator Metacritic, Der Lange Marsch received "universal acclaim" based on a weighted average score of 81 out of 100 from 7 critic scores.

Paul Simpson of AllMusic commented that the album's tracks "set atmospheric layers of heavily treated samples to thumping 4/4 kick drums." He added, "Presented as a continuous hour-long mix, the album builds anticipation by starting out with a thick layer of vinyl crackle and slowly fading in the steadily paced beat, which barely changes throughout the entire course of the album." Daniel Bromfield of Pitchfork wrote, "while it's structured as a single piece, like Rausch, it moves more quickly, never staying on one idea too long; the rhythm runs completely uninterrupted for the central hour of the 67-minute album."

== Track listing ==
Der Lange Marsch track listing
No.	Title	Length
1.	"Der Lange Marsch 1"	6:05
2.	"Der Lange Marsch 2"	5:51
3.	"Der Lange Marsch 3"	5:30
4.	"Der Lange Marsch 4"	4:53
5.	"Der Lange Marsch 5"	6:45
6.	"Der Lange Marsch 6"	5:11
7.	"Der Lange Marsch 7"	3:12
8.	"Der Lange Marsch 8"	7:00
9.	"Der Lange Marsch 9"	5:14
10.	"Der Lange Marsch 10"	10:46
11.	"Der Lange Marsch 11"	7:08
Total length:		67:35

== Personnel ==
Credits adapted from liner notes.

- Wolfgang Voigt – music concept
