= Zauberberg (album) =

Studio album by Gas
- Released: December 1997
- Genre: Dark ambient; ambient techno
- Length: 55:05 (vinyl); 65:52 (CD); 77:12 (Box version)
- Label: Mille Plateaux MP CD 45
- Producer: Wolfgang Voigt

Gas chronology
Gas (1996)	Zauberberg (1997)	Königsforst (1998)

Professional ratings
Review scores
Source	Rating
AllMusic	4.5/5 stars
Pitchfork	8.7/10

Zauberberg (English: Magic Mountain) is the second album by Wolfgang Voigt's Gas project. It was first released on vinyl in December 1997 on the Mille Plateaux label, with a CD release following in February 1998. The album is named in reference to the Thomas Mann novel The Magic Mountain (Der Zauberberg). It is the first Gas album to incorporate the forest imagery that would become a trademark of the project. Reviews generally cite Zauberberg as the darkest, most dissonant Gas release.

The CD and vinyl pressings feature notable differences. The songs are re-ordered for the CD format, with several presented as extended versions. For Zauberberg's inclusion in the Nah und Fern boxed set, track 6 of the CD was replaced with an extended version of the same piece. Gas' second boxed set, Box, features tracks 1, 3, 6 and 7 of the CD in extended format.

== Track listing ==
=== Vinyl pressing ===
All tracks are written by Wolfgang Voigt

Side A
No.	Title	Length
1.	Untitled (2 on CD)	14:02
Total length:		14:02

Side B
No.	Title	Length
1.	Untitled (4 on CD)	5:54
2.	Untitled (5 on CD)	7:18
Total length:		13:12

Side C
No.	Title	Length
1.	Untitled (3 on CD)	12:36
Total length:		12:36

Side D
No.	Title	Length
1.	Untitled (6 on CD)	6:42
2.	Untitled (7 on CD)	8:33
Total length:		15:15

=== Compact disc pressing ===
All tracks are written by Wolfgang Voigt

No.	Title	Length
1.	Untitled	7:50
2.	Untitled (A1 on vinyl)	14:12
3.	Untitled (C1 on vinyl)	12:50
4.	Untitled (B1 on vinyl)	6:01
5.	Untitled (B2 on vinyl)	8:04
6.	Untitled (D1 on vinyl)	7:23
7.	Untitled (D2 on vinyl)	9:32
Total length:		65:52

=== Box version (2016) ===
All tracks are written by Wolfgang Voigt

No.	Title	Length
1.	"Zauberberg 1" (extended version)	11:42
2.	"Zauberberg 2"	14:12
3.	"Zauberberg 3" (extended version)	14:28
4.	"Zauberberg 4"	5:53
5.	"Zauberberg 5"	7:56
6.	"Zauberberg 6" (extended version)	10:58
7.	"Zauberberg 7" (extended version)	11:58
Total length:		77:12
