= Rausch (Gas album) =

Studio album by Gas
- Released: 18 May 2018
- Genres: Ambient; ambient techno
- Length: 60:13
- Label: Kompakt
- Producer: Wolfgang Voigt

Gas chronology
Narkopop (2017)	Rausch (2018)	Der Lange Marsch (2021)

Professional ratings
Aggregate scores
Source	Rating
AnyDecentMusic?	7.7/10
Metacritic	79/100
Review scores
Source	Rating
AllMusic	4/5 stars
The A.V. Club	B
Exclaim!	7/10
The Line of Best Fit	8.5/10
Mojo	3/5 stars
Paste	9.2/10
Pitchfork	7.8/10
PopMatters	8/10
Tiny Mix Tapes	4/5 stars
Uncut	7/10

Rausch is the sixth studio album by Wolfgang Voigt's Gas project. The album was released on 18 May 2018. The album consists of one piece of music that is indexed solely for navigational purposes, and is designed to be listened to in one sitting. Both vinyl and CD pressings contain the full piece.

== Track listing ==
=== Vinyl pressing ===
All tracks are written by Wolfgang Voigt.

Side A
No.	Title	Length
1.	Untitled	17:40
Total length:		17:40

Side B
No.	Title	Length
1.	Untitled	13:32
Total length:		13:32

Side C
No.	Title	Length
1.	Untitled	14:46
Total length:		14:46

Side D
No.	Title	Length
1.	Untitled	14:15
Total length:		14:15

=== CD pressing ===
No.	Title	Length
1.	Untitled	7:54
2.	Untitled	9:46
3.	Untitled	13:32
4.	Untitled	5:03
5.	Untitled	9:43
6.	Untitled	7:56
7.	Untitled	6:19
Total length:		60:13
