= Sentielle Objectif Actualité =

Studio album by Mark Fell
- Released: 10 September 2012
- Length: 54:18
- Label: Editions Mego

Mark Fell chronology
Manitutshu (2011)	Sentielle Objectif Actualité (2012)	n-Dimensional Analysis (2013)

Sentielle Objectif Actualité is a studio album by English music producer Mark Fell. It was released on 10 September 2012 through Editions Mego. It received generally favorable reviews from critics.

== Background ==
Sentielle Objectif Actualité contains seven remixes by Mark Fell of three 12-inch singles ("10", "5", and "3.3") released in 2012 through Sensate Focus. The album was released on 10 September 2012 in the United Kingdom and 11 September 2012 in the United States, through Editions Mego.

== Critical reception ==
Professional ratings
Aggregate scores
Source	Rating
Metacritic	76/100
Review scores
Source	Rating
AllMusic	3.5/5 stars
Pitchfork	7.5/10
PopMatters	7/10 stars
Resident Advisor	3.5/5

According to the review aggregator Metacritic, Sentielle Objectif Actualité received "generally favorable reviews" based on a weighted average score of 76 out of 100 from 5 critic scores.

Ned Raggett of AllMusic described the album as "another chance for Mark Fell to work with techno as something that's as much hyperclean art object as it is invitation to dance." He added, "The whole album is pop on the one hand but pop of a self-consciously other kind, transformed from easy hooks and direct flow into an arch blend of past and present, something where 1981, 1993, 2001, and 2012 recombine and intertwine." Angus Finlayson of Resident Advisor commented that "this album represents an intriguing compromise between Fell's distinctive language and the friendlier environs of the contemporary dance floor."

Patrick Masterson of Dusted Magazine stated, "In these songs, it's almost baffling to think that Fell is the same guy behind SND — the sounds are recognizable, but the hassle of head-bobbing has been removed." Andrew Gaerig of Pitchfork commented that "Fell denies us much of what we expect from dance music: a sense of journey, a traceable rhythm, a defined purpose or utility." He added, "In doing so, and in offering us oases of melody, he approaches trance from the complete opposite direction."

Otis Hart of Dusted Magazine named it the 6th best album of 2012.

== Track listing ==
Sentielle Objectif Actualité track listing
No.	Title	Length
1.	"SOA-1"	7:43
2.	"SOA-2"	8:43
3.	"SOA-3"	6:37
4.	"SOA-4"	7:19
5.	"SOA-5"	8:27
6.	"SOA-6"	10:14
7.	"SOA-7"	5:14
Total length:		54:18
