= Vello Vinn =

Estonian artist

- Born: 4 October 1939; Saaremaa, Estonia
- Education: Estonian Academy of Arts
- Known for: Drawing, Printmaking

Vello Vinn (born 4 October 1939) is an Estonia printmaker.

== Life and work ==
Vello Vinn was born in Sõrve, Saaremaa on 4 October 1939. He studied English philology at the University of Tartu in 1959 to 1962, and art in the Estonian Academy of Arts from 1963 to 1968 where he graduated in the field of glass art. However, in 1968 itself he ditched glass for print. His specialty became etching and drypoint. In the nineties he participated in the Estonian 'PARA'-Surrealist movement (Eller 1996; Kaevats 1998; Helme and Kangilaski 1999). The works of Vello Vinn form a noteworthy example of the oeuvre of an Estonian printmaker from the late 1960s and early 1970s. Vinn’s highly original work is grounded in his mastery of various printmaking techniques, delicate treatment of images and witty associations. The artist’s work reflects his play with space and images, and his attention to detail. Besides playful images, Vinn’s prints often present witty wordplay and warm absurd humour, which invite viewers to join in the artist’s thought and creative processes (Taidre 2020).

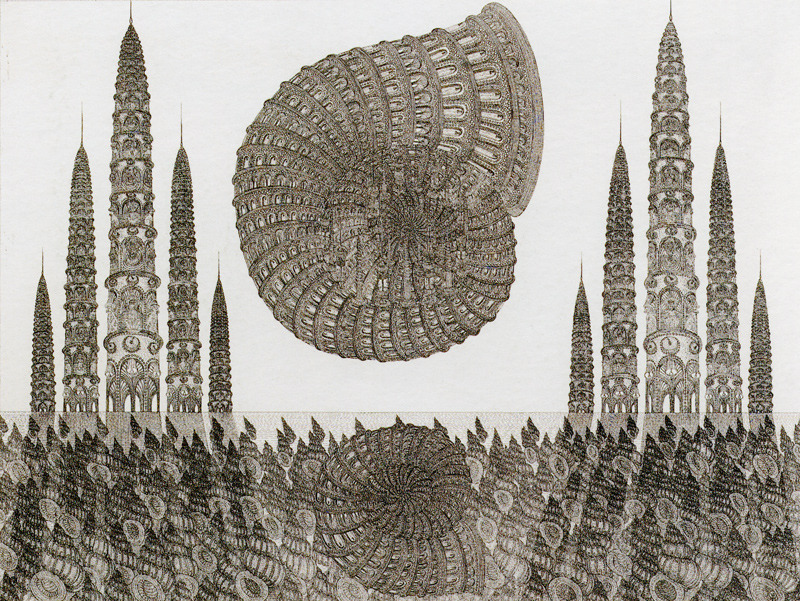
Rockets (1971)

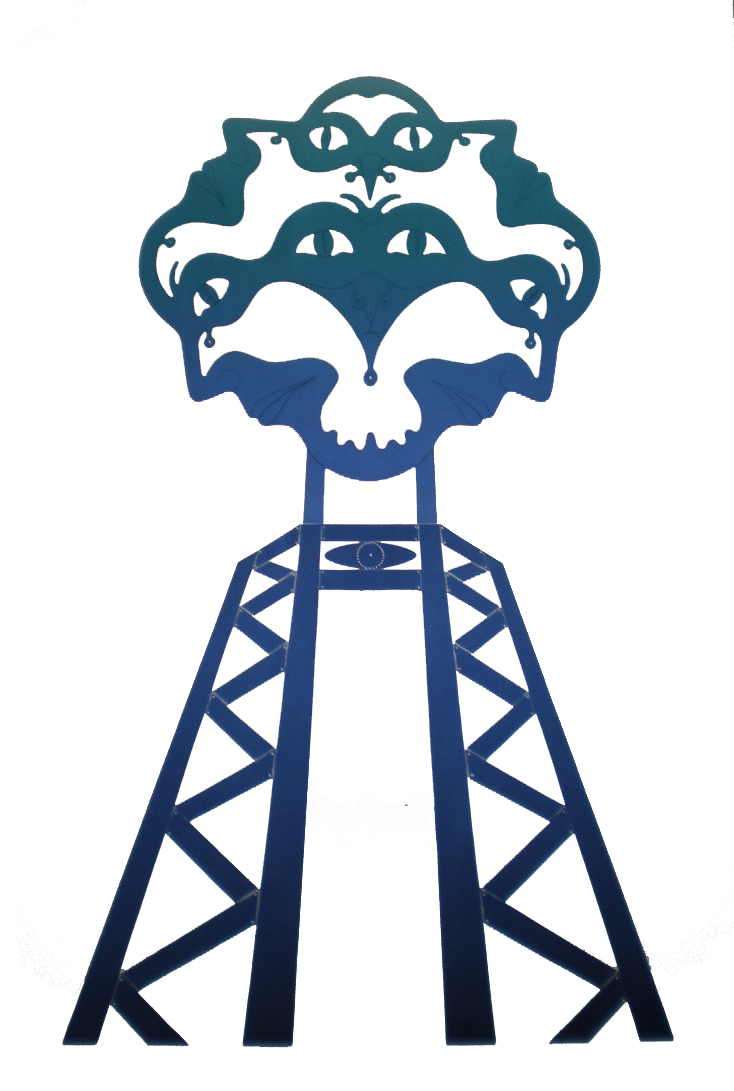
Multifaced III (2009)

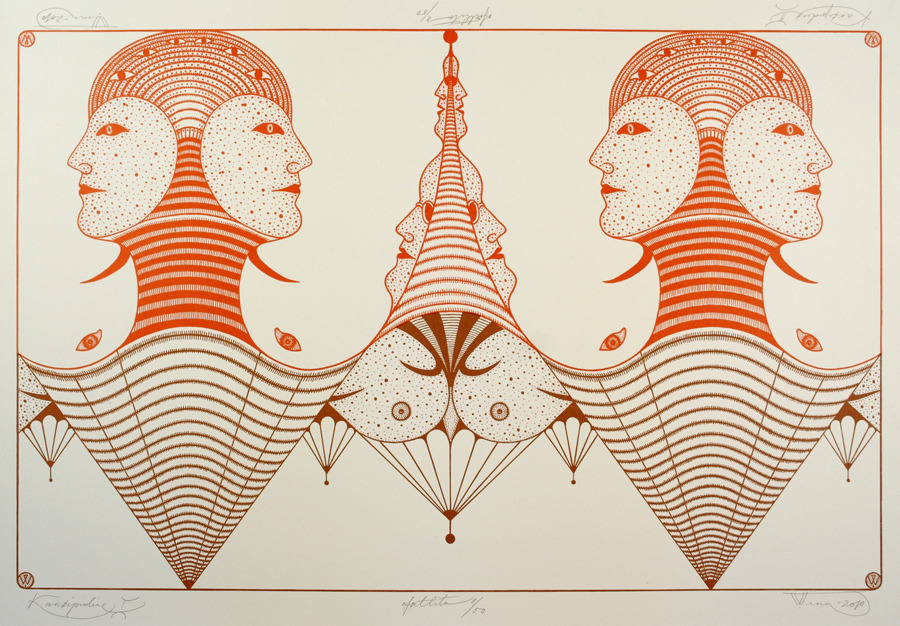
With two sides (2010)

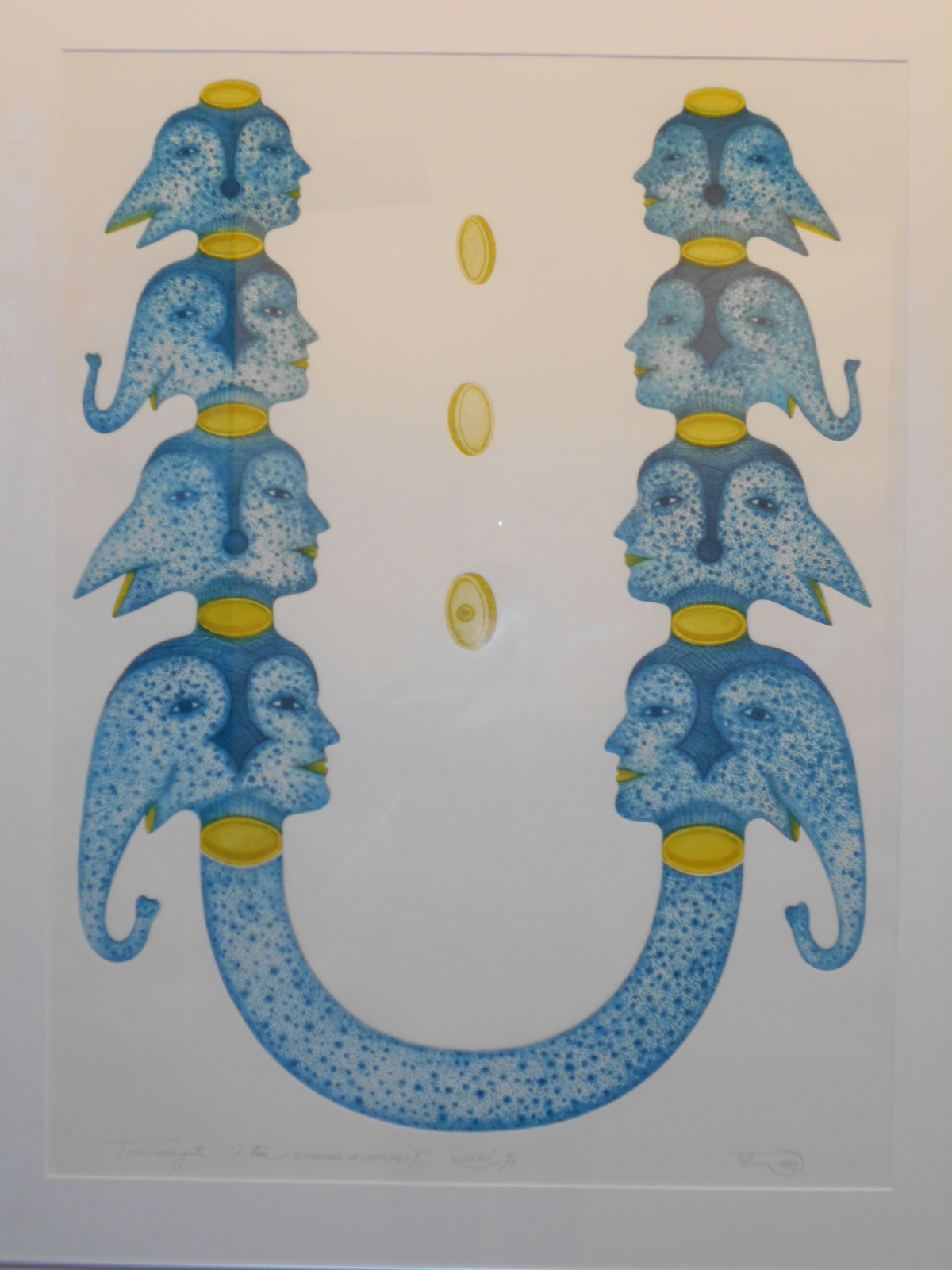
U-tube for market research I (2013)

== Solo exhibitions ==
This is only a partial listing.

- Tallinn (Estonia) 1970,1977, 1984,1989,1992, 1994,1996,1996, 2006, 2009, 2011, 2014, 2019, 2020
- Tartu together with Jaanus Kivaste (Estonia) 2020
- Kuressaare (Estonia) 1980, 1995
- Rapla (Estonia) 1983
- Vilnius (Lithuania) 1985
- Helsinki (Finland) 1987
- Brandenburg (Germany) 1989
- Paldiski (Estonia) 1997–98
- Frederikshavn (Denmark) 2012

== Awards ==
- Prix d`Emona IX Ljubljana Biennial of Graphic Arts, 1971
- Diploma II Tallinn Print Triennial, 1971
- Special prize V ja VII Tallinn Print Triennial, 1980, 1986
- Special prize, Vilnius Biennale of Exlibris 1979,1981,1983, diploma 1993
- Diploma, I Miniature Prints Triennal in Riga 1983
- Special prize II Artist's Book Triennial Vilnius 1984
- Main prize V Vilnius Biennale of Exlibris 1985
- Gold Point Uzice V International Graphic Art Biennale, Dry Point, Uzice (Yugoslavia), 2001
- Gold Point Uzice VI International Graphic Art Biennale, Dry Point, Uzice (Serbia and Montenegro), 2003
- Kristjan Raud Prize, Tallinn, 2015
- Lifetime achievement award from the Cultural Endowment of Estonia, Tallinn, 2021
- Eduard Wiiralt Prize, Tallinn, 2025

== Gallery ==
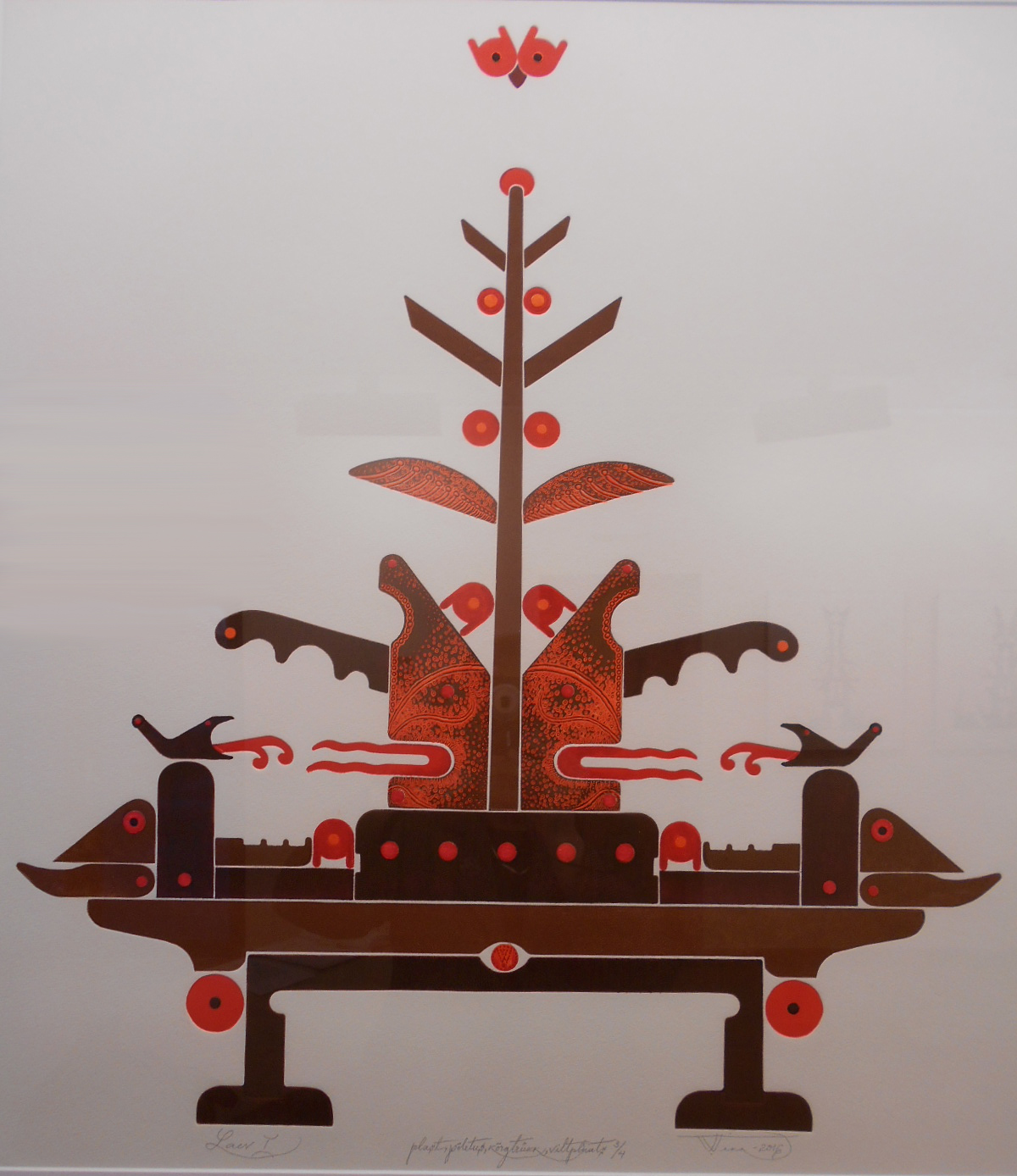
Ship I (2016)

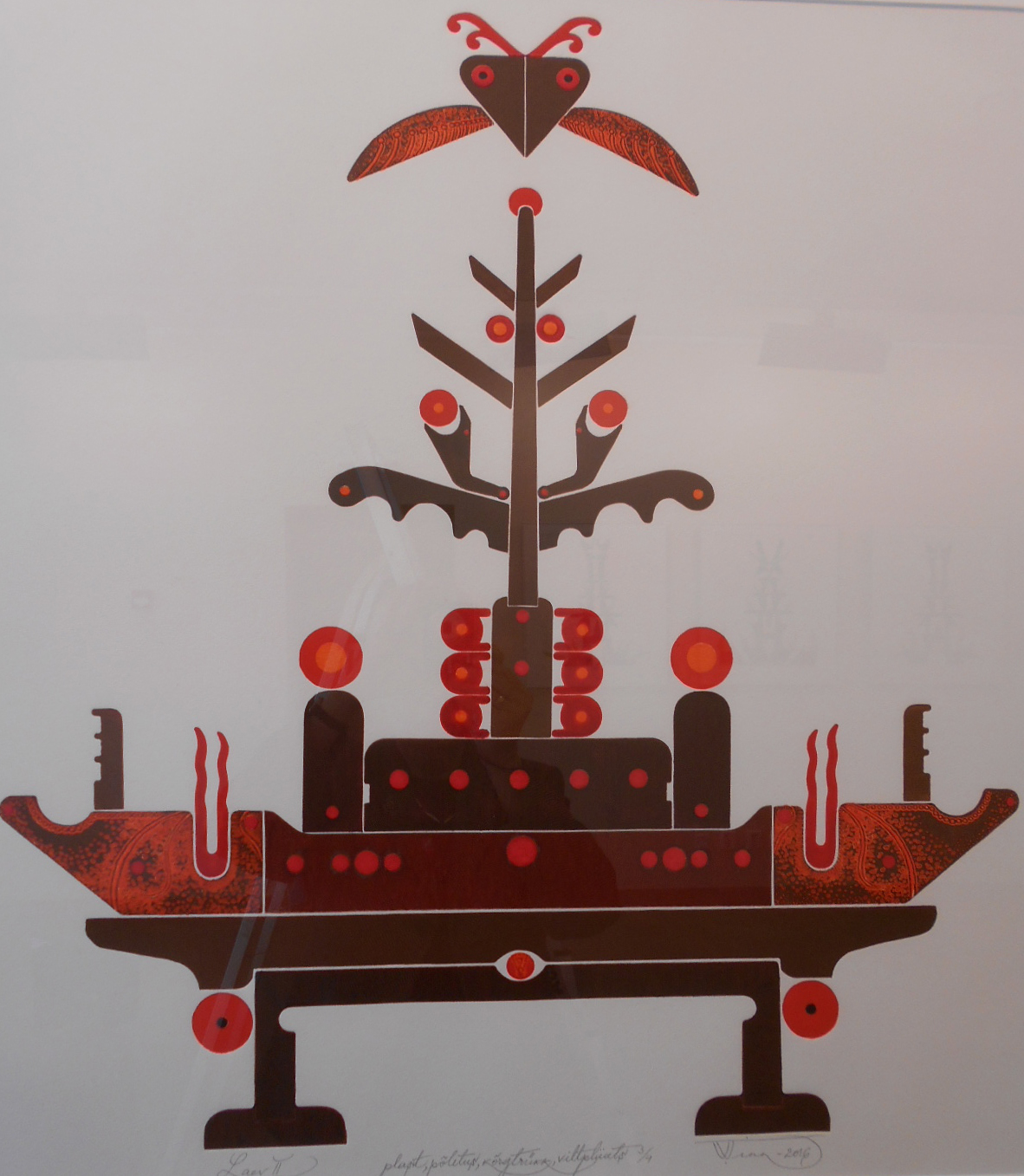
Ship II (2016)

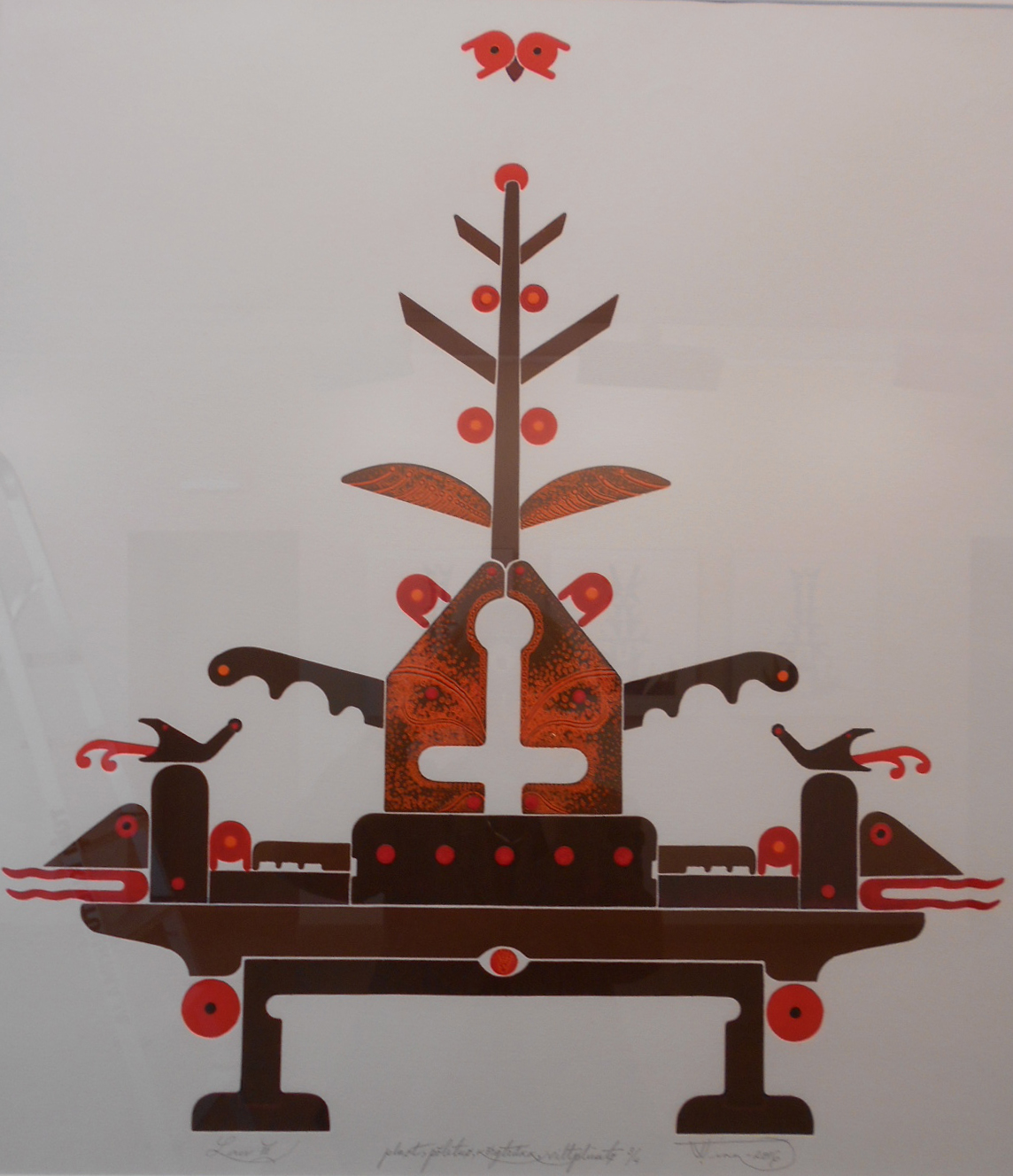
Ship III (2016)

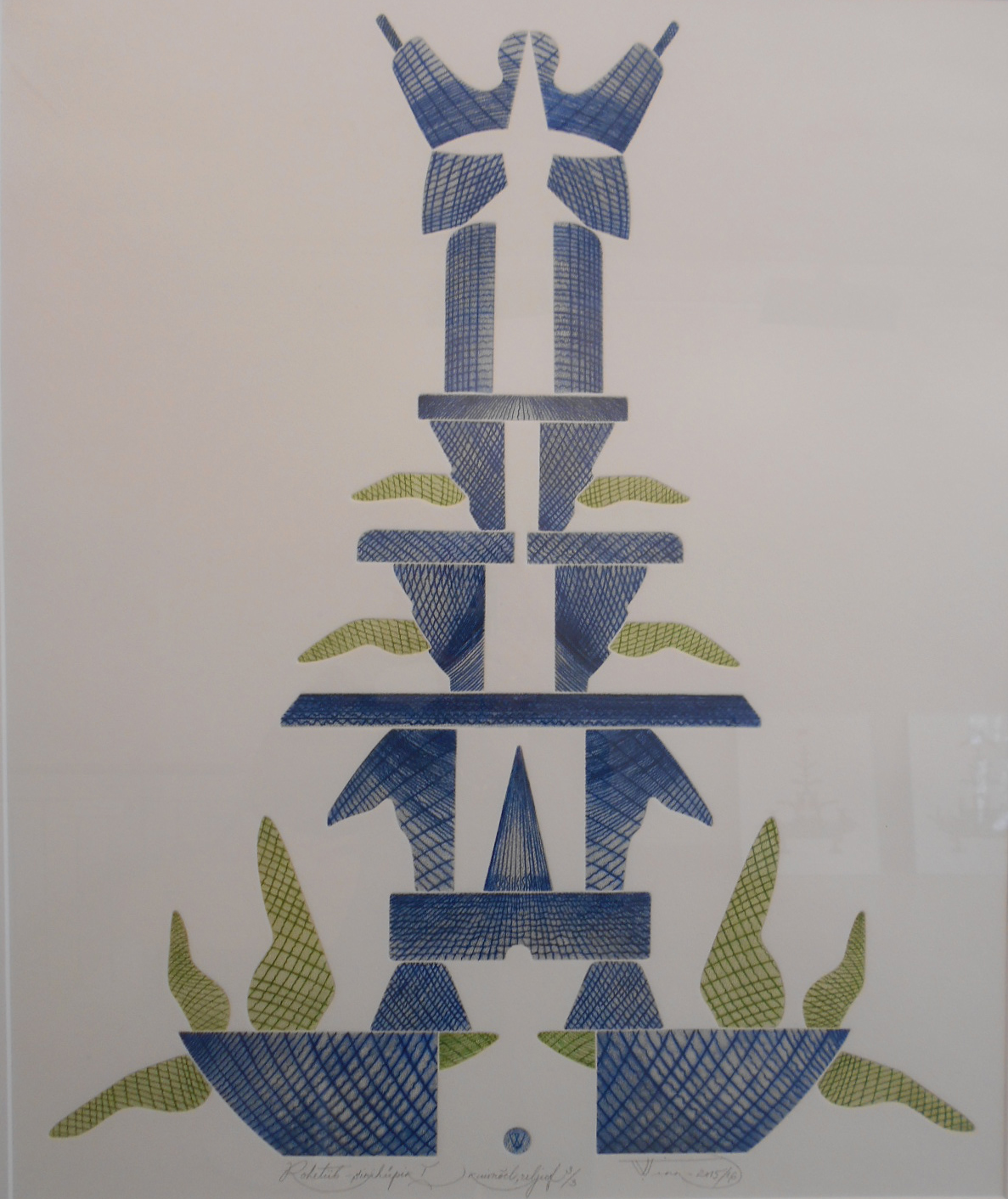
Green winged blue jumper I (2015/16)

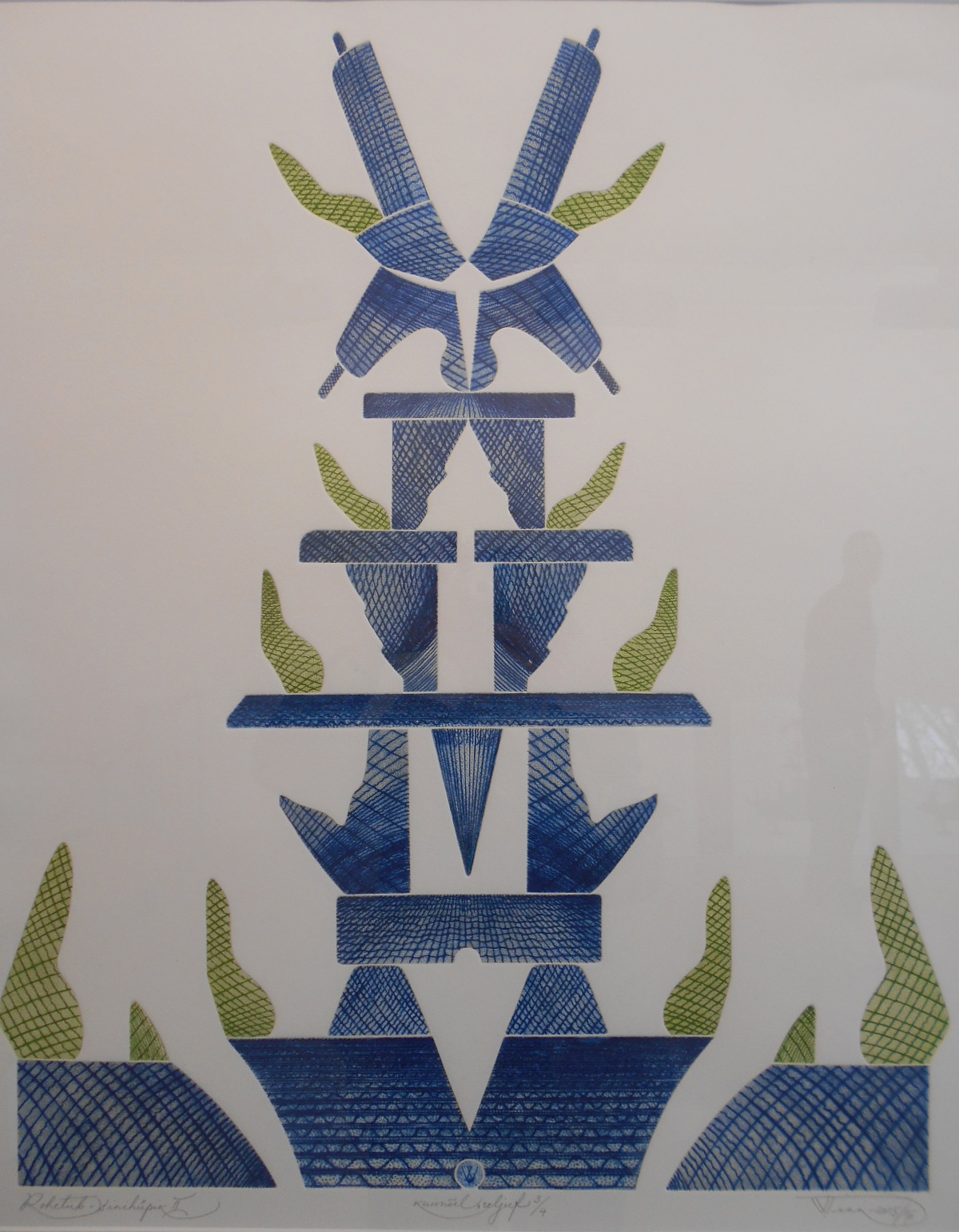
Green winged blue jumper II (2015/16)

== Sources ==
- Eller, M.-I. 1996. Bibliographic lexicon of Estonian Art and Architecture. Tallinn, p. 594-595.
- Kaevats, Ü. 1998. Estonian Encyclopedia 10. Tallinn, Entsüklopeedia Kirjastus, p. 445.
- Helme, S. and Kangilaski, J. 1999. Short history of Estonian art. Tallinn, p. 188,204,206.
- Taidre, E. (ed.). 2020. Vello Vinn. Eesti Kunstimuuseum, Tallinn, 224 pp.
