= Gas (musician) =

German musical artist Wolfgang Voigt (born 1961)

- The signature Gas logo

Background information
- Born: Wolfgang Voigt
- Genres: Ambient; ambient techno; minimal techno; psychedelia
- Instruments: Sampler; drum machine; piano; equalizer
- Years active: 1995–2000; 2014–present
- Labels: Mille Plateaux; Kompakt; Profan

Gas (stylized as GAS or G A S) is the main musical project of German electronic musician and composer Wolfgang Voigt (born 1961). The project was created as an expressive medium inspired by his experiences with taking LSD in the Königsforst, a German forest situated near his hometown of Cologne, for long periods in his youth. He has claimed that the intention of the project is to "bring the forest to the disco, or vice-versa".

== History ==
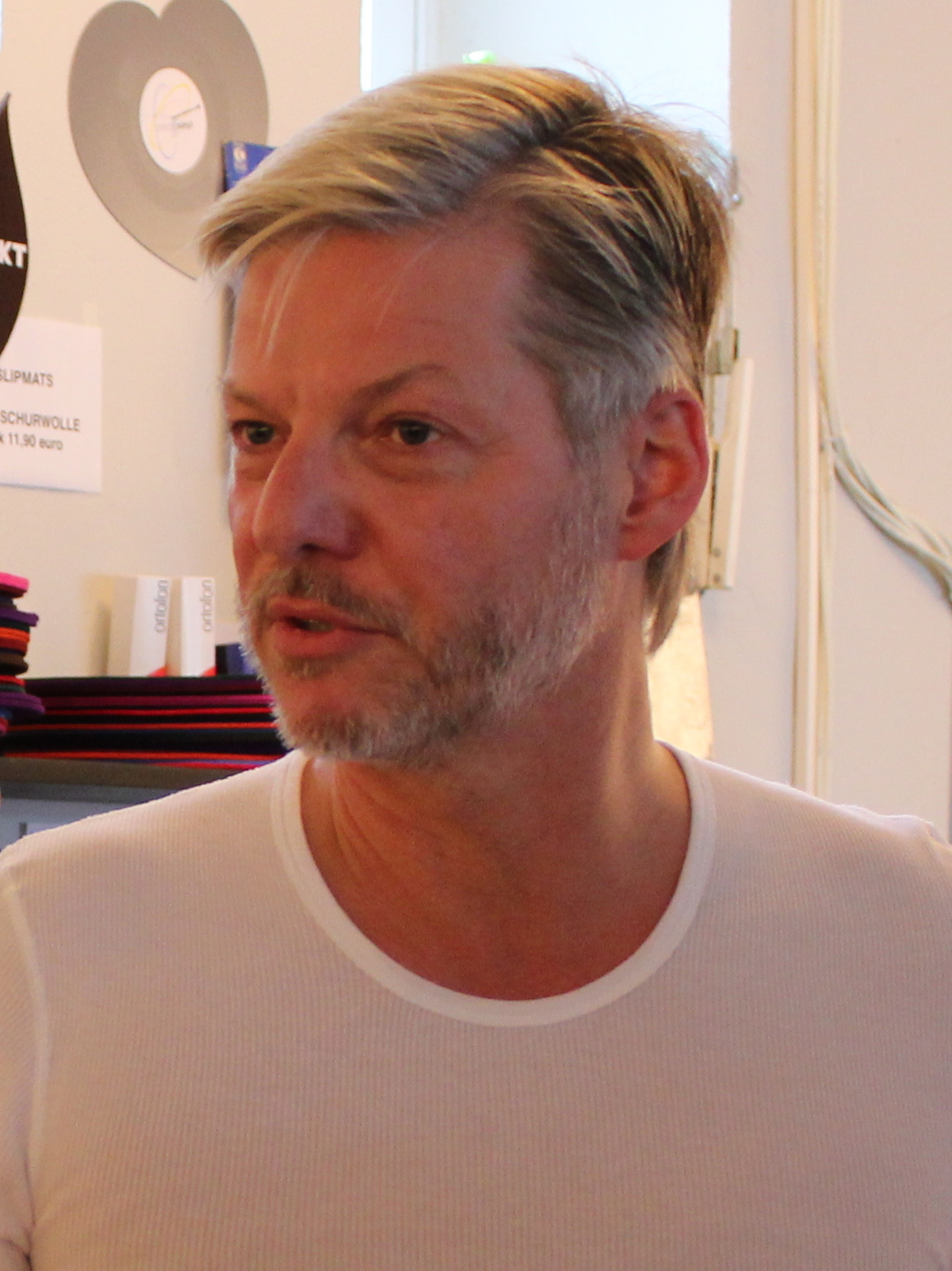
Wolfgang Voigt in 2012

Wolfgang Voigt began creating music under the name of Gas starting in 1995, when he released the EP Modern on the label Profan. However, he has regarded individual pieces created from 1989 onward as being part of the Gas project, marked by a compiled 2008 release under his real name.

A hiatus for the Gas project started after the release of Pop in 2000, but this concluded when in 2008, Voigt's own label Kompakt re-released all four of his Gas albums, albeit with subtle changes made to the tracks, as a four-CD box set entitled Nah und Fern. A limited double vinyl version of the set was also released, with one track from each album per side.

In 2016, Kompakt reissued Zauberberg, Königsforst, Oktember, and Pop as a 10-LP box set called Box, again editing or expanding many of the tracks.

Voigt has intermittently revived the project for remixes and released new Gas albums since, including Narkopop (2017), Rausch (2018), and Der Lange Marsch (2021).

== Musical style ==
Untitled
Excerpt from the untitled third track from Zauberberg, demonstrating Gas's characteristic sound.

Gas's music is primarily regarded as ambient techno and minimal techno, combining ambient music and 4/4 techno. It is the most abstract of Voigt's many projects, with albums consisting of several long untitled tracks. All Gas material shares a characteristic sound, based on a hazy ambient wash of drones and sampled loops, "barely-audible fragments of horns, strings, record hiss and wind", usually accompanied by a repetitive four-on-the-floor kick drum. The Wire described it as "an outdoor rave, heard floating through the air from a neighbouring village". Voigt has declared it to be "GASeous music, caught by a bass drum just marching by, that streams, streams out through the underwood across the forest soil". He also said it "[moves] around in constantly overlapping loop structures" and "there is no definite start nor end". His live performances, which he performs using MIDI controls and Ableton Live, have this same organic quality.

He commented that he builds his tracks using samples, which are manipulated beyond recognition to create what can better be described as textural environments than songs. He described the technique as "a certain kind of loops [sic] and reverse, and alternated reverses, which has no ending and no start, and it's just totally confusing".

== Discography ==
All Gas tracks are untitled, except the Modern and Oktember releases.

=== Studio albums ===
- Gas (Mille Plateaux, 1996)
- Zauberberg (Mille Plateaux, 1997)
- Königsforst (Mille Plateaux, 1998)
- Pop (Mille Plateaux, 2000)
- Narkopop (Kompakt, 2017)
- Rausch (Kompakt, 2018)
- Der Lange Marsch (Kompakt, 2021)

=== Compilation albums ===
- Nah und Fern (Kompakt, 2008)
- Box (Kompakt, 2016)

=== EPs ===
- Modern (Profan, 1995)
- Oktember (Mille Plateaux, 1999)

=== Singles ===
- "Zeit" (Profan, 2020)

=== Remixes ===
- Love Inc. – "Hot Love (Gas Mix) (1995)
- Markus Guentner – "Regensburg (Gas Mix)" (2002)
- The Field – "Cupid's Head (Gas Ambient Mix)" (2014)
- Robyn & Kindness – "Who Do You Love (Wolfgang Voigt GAS Mix)" (2016)

== See also ==
- List of ambient music artists
