= Popp (album) =

Studio album by Oval
- Released: 14 October 2016
- Recorded: 2015–2016
- Genre: Electronic
- Length: 43:42
- Label: Uovooo
- Producer: Markus Popp

Oval chronology
| Voa (2013) | Popp (2016) | Scis (2020) |

Popp is a studio album by Oval, a project of German record producer Markus Popp. It was released on 14 October 2016 through Uovooo. The album received positive reviews from critics.

== Background ==
In a 2016 interview, Oval's Markus Popp said, "the Popp album project started as a reverse-engineering of my 1990s sound aesthetic (Systemisch and 94diskont.), revisiting that classic Oval glitch aesthetic, but using the convenient, powerful (and at times downright lazy) tools of today." Popp was released on 14 October 2016 through his own record label Uovooo. The album's cover art was created by Antonia Hirsch.

== Critical reception ==
Professional ratings
Review scores
| Source | Rating |
|---|---|
| AllMusic | 4/5 stars |
| Pitchfork | 7.5/10 |
| PopMatters | 8/10 stars |
| Resident Advisor | 3.8/5 |

Marc Masters of Resident Advisor commented that Popp "may be the most accessible and unashamedly enjoyable Oval album to date". He added, "Since most Oval records have a conceptual side, it's natural to look for meta-commentary in Popp's take on club music, but he sounds earnest and genuinely enthused here." Jeff Terich of Bandcamp Daily stated, "Danceable, ecstatic and employing more vocal chops, it's an album more closely aligned with microhouse and, at times, even classic house; a study and deconstruction of club music that retains its buoyancy and sense of fun."

Ben Scheim of Pitchfork described the album as "[Markus Popp's] most consistent and well-rounded collection since 2001's Ovalcommers, showing a side of, well, pop to his music that has often dwelled below the surface but never so overtly above it." Andrew Paschal of PopMatters stated, "In the end, Popp goes beyond the cerebral and scattered surface that it first projects to become something far more affirming, revelatory, and perhaps even joyful."

== Track listing ==
All tracks are written by Markus Popp.

Popp track listing
| No. | Title | Length |
|---|---|---|
| 1. | "Ai" | 4:20 |
| 2. | "Fu" | 3:28 |
| 3. | "Re" | 4:00 |
| 4. | "Ku" | 4:12 |
| 5. | "Sa" | 4:16 |
| 6. | "Lo" | 4:10 |
| 7. | "Id" | 3:28 |
| 8. | "My" | 3:36 |
| 9. | "Mo" | 3:20 |
| 10. | "Ca" | 4:08 |
| 11. | "Ve" | 4:24 |
| Total length: | | 43:42 |

Bandcamp edition bonus track
| No. | Title | Length |
|---|---|---|
| 12. | "Se" | 3:52 |
| 13. | "Fi" | 3:28 |
| 14. | "Co" | 3:08 |
| Total length: | | 54:10 |

Notes

- All track titles are stylized in all lowercase.

== Personnel ==
Credits adapted from liner notes.

- Markus Popp – arrangement, production
- Antonia Hirsch – cover image
