= Clicks & Cuts Series =

Compilation album series by Mille Plateaux

Clicks & Cuts Series is a compilation series from the German music label Mille Plateaux. It features various experimental electronic artists to give an example of the sound and variety of the glitch music movement of the early 2000s. So far, six volumes have been released.

The term "clicks & cuts" was first used by an English journalist writing about glitch music and the Mille Plateaux label.

== Volumes ==
1. Clicks & Cuts
2. Clicks & Cuts 2
3. Clicks & Cuts 3
4. Clicks & Cuts 4
5. Clicks & Cuts 5.0 - Paradigm Shift
6. Clicks & Cuts 5.1 - Paradigm Shift (The Bonus Package)
Clicks & Cuts, Vol. 2
(2001)
Mille Plateaux
