= Königsforst =

Studio album by Gas
- Released: December 1998
- Genre: Ambient, ambient techno
- Length: 57:50 (vinyl); 64:59 (CD); 78:04 (Box version)
- Label: Mille Plateaux MP CD 65
- Producer: Wolfgang Voigt

Gas chronology
Zauberberg (1997)	Königsforst (1998)	Oktember (1999)

Professional ratings
Review scores
Source	Rating
AllMusic	3.5/5 stars
Pitchfork	9.1/10

Königsforst is the third album by Wolfgang Voigt's Gas project. It was released in December 1998 on the Mille Plateaux label. The album is named after Königsforst recreation park, near Voigt's hometown of Köln, in which his youthful experiments with LSD provided inspiration for the entire Gas project.

The CD and vinyl pressings feature notable differences. The first songs on the vinyl's A and D sides were exclusive to this pressing until the 2016 release of Gas' second box set, Box, where they were added to the end of the CD version of Königsforst. The CD features a re-arranged track listing, with tracks B2 and D2 gaining noticeable extensions; B2 gains nearly eight minutes of runtime. The first track on CD was also released as "Oktember A" on the Oktember EP; because of this, "Oktember A" was replaced with "Tal '90" – a piece Voigt wrote under the alias of Tal – when Oktember was included in Box alongside Königsforst.

== Track listing ==
=== Vinyl pressing ===
All tracks are written by Wolfgang Voigt

Side A
No.	Title	Length
1.	Untitled (7 on CD, Box version only)	6:15
2.	Untitled (3 on CD)	8:01
Total length:		14:16

Side B
No.	Title	Length
1.	Untitled (4 on CD)	6:33
2.	Untitled (2 on CD)	6:47
Total length:		13:20

Side C
No.	Title	Length
1.	Untitled (5 on CD)	15:03
Total length:		15:03

Side D
No.	Title	Length
1.	Untitled (8 on CD, Box version only)	7:17
2.	Untitled (6 on CD)	7:54
Total length:		15:11

=== Compact disc pressing ===
All tracks are written by Wolfgang Voigt

No.	Title	Length
1.	Untitled (also released as "Oktember A" on Oktember)	9:43
2.	Untitled (B2 on vinyl)	14:01
3.	Untitled (A2 on vinyl)	9:02
4.	Untitled (B1 on vinyl)	6:34
5.	Untitled (C1 on vinyl)	15:17
6.	Untitled (D2 on vinyl)	10:22
Total length:		64:59

=== Box version (2016) ===
All tracks are written by Wolfgang Voigt

No.	Title	Length
1.	"Königsforst 1" (also released as "Oktember A" on Oktember)	9:38
2.	"Königsforst 2" (B2 on vinyl)	13:56
3.	"Königsforst 3" (A2 on vinyl)	9:02
4.	"Königsforst 4" (B1 on vinyl)	6:34
5.	"Königsforst 5" (C1 on vinyl)	15:17
6.	"Königsforst 6" (D2 on vinyl)	10:22
7.	"Königsforst 7" (A1 on vinyl, previously unavailable on CD)	6:18
8.	"Königsforst 8" (D1 on vinyl, previously unavailable on CD)	7:11
Total length:		78:04
