= Narkopop =

Studio album by Gas
- Released: 21 April 2017
- Genre: Ambient; ambient techno; drone
- Length: 87:35 (vinyl); 71:18 (CD)
- Label: Kompakt
- Producer: Wolfgang Voigt

Gas chronology
Box (2016)	Narkopop (2017)	Rausch (2018)

Narkopop is the fifth studio album by Wolfgang Voigt's Gas project, the first album under the moniker in 17 years and his first on Kompakt. The album was released on 21 April 2017.

== Reception ==
Professional ratings
Aggregate scores
Source	Rating
AnyDecentMusic?	7.8/10
Metacritic	86/100
Review scores
Source	Rating
AllMusic	4.5/5 stars
The A.V. Club	B+
Exclaim!	9/10
The Irish Times	3/5 stars
Mojo	4/5 stars
The Observer	4/5 stars
Pitchfork	8.8/10
Record Collector	4/5 stars
Resident Advisor	4.0/5
Uncut	8/10

On the review aggregate site Metacritic, Narkopop has a score of 86 out of 100, indicating "universal acclaim", based on 14 reviews. Paul Simpson at AllMusic calls it an "evolution and refinement" of the Gas sound. Mark Richardson from Pitchfork complimented its "deeper, richer, and more luxurious sound" compared to prior Gas releases.

Andrew Ryce at Resident Advisor gave a mostly positive review, but was ambivalent about its more "direct" style, noting "in this sharper relief, you can see the stitches in Voigt's usually seamless work." Daniel Bromfield at Spectrum Culture called it "immovable, monolithic, not to be trifled with" but observed "there's little of the bewitching sound design of the original Gas records".

Exclaim! ranked Narkopop at number six on their Top 10 Dance and Electronic Albums of 2017 list.

== Track listing ==
=== Vinyl pressing ===
All tracks are written by Wolfgang Voigt

Side A
No.	Title	Length
1.	Untitled	4:26
2.	Untitled	9:44
Total length:		14:10

Side B
No.	Title	Length
1.	Untitled	3:50
2.	Untitled	3:34
3.	Untitled	6:03
Total length:		13:27

Side C
No.	Title	Length
1.	Untitled	4:43
2.	Untitled	8:40
Total length:		13:23

Side D
No.	Title	Length
1.	Untitled	6:07
2.	Untitled	7:02
Total length:		13:09

Side E
No.	Title	Length
1.	Untitled	17:09
Total length:		17:09

Side F
No.	Title	Length
1.	Untitled	16:17
Total length:		16:17

=== CD pressing ===
No.	Title	Length
1.	Untitled	4:26
2.	Untitled	9:44
3.	Untitled	3:50
4.	Untitled	3:34
5.	Untitled	6:03
6.	Untitled	4:43
7.	Untitled	8:40
8.	Untitled	6:07
9.	Untitled	7:02
10.	Untitled	17:09
Total length:		71:18

Digital bonus track
No.	Title	Length
1.	"Narkopop" (continuous mix)	71:18
Total length:		149:56

Note that the digital release has longer track lengths than the CD and vinyl editions. The digital bonus track is the runtime of the album on CD and vinyl (excluding the bonus track found on vinyl, not included on CD and digital releases).

== Charts ==
Chart (2017)	Peak position
Belgian Albums (Ultratop Flanders)	128
Belgian Albums (Ultratop Wallonia)	178
