= Mark Fell (artist) =

British electronic musician

- Also known as: Sensate Focus
- Origin: Rotherham, England
- Occupations: Music producer; artist
- Years active: 1998–present
- Labels: Editions Mego; Frozen Reeds; Liberation Technologies; National Centre for Mark Fell Studies; Raster-Noton
- Formerly of: Shirt Trax; Snd

Mark Fell is an English music producer and artist based in Rotherham.

He has released several albums under his own name, with the duo Snd he shares with Mat Steel, under the moniker Sensate Focus, and in various collaborations. He also maintains a sound art installation practice.

Fell's work primarily explores the politics and ideologies of electronic dance music and experimental music culture, and is noted for its restrained and minimal style, which writer Dan Barrow described in The Wire as "fragments of dance genres . . . torn from their contexts and stripped down to their barest logic, each component probed and rearranged until it makes provisional sense".

He also released solo albums Multistability (2010), UL8 (2010), and Sentielle Objectif Actualité (2012).

== Discography ==
=== Albums ===
- Multistability (Raster-Noton, 2010)
- UL8 (Editions Mego, 2010)
- Periodic Orbits of a Dynamic System Related to a Knot (Editions Mego, 2011)
- Manitutshu (Editions Mego, 2011)
- Sentielle Objectif Actualité (Editions Mego, 2012)
- n-Dimensional Analysis (Liberation Technologies, 2013)
- The Neurobiology of Moral Decision Making (with Gábor Lázár; The Death of Rave, 2015)
- Intra (Boomkat Editions, 2018)
- Psychic Resynthesis (Frozen Reeds, 2025)

=== EPs ===
- Nite Closures (National Centre for Mark Fell Studies, 2025)
