= Pupp =

Pupp is a surname. Notable people with the surname include:

- Noémi Pupp (born 1998), Hungarian sprint canoeist
- Réka Pupp (born 1996), Hungarian judoka

== See also ==
- Grandhotel Pupp
- Popp
