= Microstoria =

German experimental electronic duo

Microstoria (sometimes in all lowercase) is an experimental electronic duo composed of Markus Popp of Oval and Jan St. Werner of Mouse on Mars, founded in 1994 in Düsseldorf, Germany.

Their first full-length album released in 1995, released in Europe on the Mille Plateaux label and reissued in America through Thrill Jockey. Three further releases (including 2000's Model 3, Step 2) followed on both labels, and the pair continued working together through 2002. According to Popp, as compared to Oval, "Microstoria does focus much more on the playfulness of the overall approach," incorporating warmer sounds.

Their second album, titled _snd, would be ranked as 44th place in Pitchfork's list of "The 50 Best Ambient Albums of All Time" in 2016.

In 2024, Microstoria released a remastered version of init ding and _snd on double vinyl and streaming services through Thrill Jockey.

== Discography ==
- init ding (Mille Plateaux/Thrill Jockey, 1995)
- _snd (Mille Plateaux/Thrill Jockey, 1996)
- Reprovisers (Mille Plateaux/Thrill Jockey, 1997)
- Model 3, Step 2 (Mille Plateaux/Thrill Jockey, 2000)
- Invisible Architecture 3 (Audiosphere Records, 2002)
- Improvisers (Sonig Records, 2002)
- init ding + _snd (Thrill Jockey, 2024)
