= Marvin Ayres =

British musician

Marvin Ayres (born 1950s) is a British composer, cellist, violinist and producer. He has composed and recorded a diverse selection of minimalist albums, incorporating spatial soundscapes and psychoacoustics and latterly 5.1 and True 3D Surround in the 'Wall of Waves' Studio. He has also produced a number of film soundtracks. All About Jazz described his work as "compelling pieces of music that can dominate and transport", while the Wire found him "a serious and thoughtful composer."

He recorded and released further albums on the Wall of Waves label, a subsidiary label of Market Square Records.

== History ==
After graduating from Trinity College of Music, Marvin Ayres toured with his own band as songwriter, singer and violinist. Ayres also made solo contributions and arrangements to bands and artists throughout the late 1980s and 1990s, including members of Culture Club, Simply Red and Frankie Goes to Hollywood.

In 1999 he was signed to the avant-garde label Mille Plateaux as composer/producer, and released two minimalist albums, Cellosphere and Neptune. Parts of these works have been performed live at the 'Festival of Electronica', (with Groove Armada's Patrick Dawes) and at 'Sprawl'. He has remixed tracks and toured with the band Club off Chaos in early 2001. Ayres was commissioned by Einstürzende Neubauten's electronica music publishers Freibank, and his compositions have been featured on five of Freibank's 'For Films' albums.

Eccentric Deliquescence was released in 2008 as a CD and limited edition 5.1 surround sound DVD. 2012 saw the release of Marvin Ayres' orchestral work Harmogram Suite on cd and 5.1 surround sound DVD. "

== Installations ==
In addition to his work with musicians, Ayres also collaborates with visual artists on audio/visual installations, which have been exhibited in international galleries and art houses. In 2000, the prestigious ICA (Institute of Contemporary Arts) in London commissioned him and film maker Pete Gomes to compose and produce their first ever DVD exhibition. The two works resulting from this were 'Sensory' and 'Cycle', incorporating spatial soundscapes and psycho acoustics and were composed specifically for 5.1 Surround Sound.

Since 2011 Martyn Ware (Human League, Heaven 17) and Marvin Ayres have collaborated on recording and 3D sound installations.

At The National Portrait Gallery London – August 2011. Ayres performed a live set and presented an 3D sound installation of his piece Anthropomorphic at 'ReAnimate' – a partnership event with Martyn Ware, Folded Wing and Future of Sound.

In 2012 Marvin Ayres embarked on Sacred Spaces, a series of conceptual installations and recordings in incongruous spaces- an evolving project. He has recorded on location on HMS Alliance, H.M.S.Victory, Concorde, Bush House, Greenwich Observatory, Winchester Cathedral. Orford Ness and Usk Lighthouse. In radio interviews on the BBC and in local press Marvin has explained how he intends to create one collective piece composed from the overtones, sustains and reverberations recorded in each environment and return to exhibit 3D sound installations (created in his Wall of Waves studio) at the locations at a later stage.

== Producer, composer, arranger ==
Marvin Ayres has continued to contribute strings and arrangements to bands and artists.

Marvin collaborated with and produced Sonja Kristina (Curved Air) between 2000 and 2008 in a project called MASK. Their 2006 hit single "Waking The Dream" came from their debut dual-disc album Heavy Petal. In 2010 MASK released their second album Technopia on Rare / Repertoire Records.

Ayres subsequently produced and performed two tracks (Melinda and Elfin Boy) on the 2008 Curved Air album Reborn. Three MASK tracks were included as bonus tracks on the 2010 anthology of Curved Air's work Retrospective.

Continuing the association with Curved Air he produced their critically acclaimed 2012 live album Live Atmosphere and also remastered Airwaves – BBC Live John Peel Sessions/The Paris Theatre featuring Stewart Copeland.

In 2010 Ayres produced and played cello on an instrumental album, Ovunque by guitarist Franccesco Fiotti

In 2011, contributing to the Sex, Drugs and H.I.V project – a double album & film of 40 songs written by Mat Sargent collaborating with over 200 different musicians from name bands, Ayres created and played string arrangements and cello and violin solo parts on tracks performed by Adam Ant, Angie Bowie, Jimmy Pursey and Sonja Kristina.

For Martyn Ware's 3rd B.E.F. (British Electric Foundation) album Dark Marvin has created song/string arrangements, for tracks performed by Boy George ("I Wanna Be Your Dog" (Iggy Pop) and "Make Up" (Lou Reed) and "Picture This" (Blondie), performed by Kate Jackson. He played the cello on this track with Kate Jackson live at The Roundhouse, London on 5 Oct 2011 at B.E.F 'Music of Quality and Distinction Live' event.

M.A.S.O -'Marvin Ayres String Orchestra' is Marvin Ayres' solo string orchestra using orthodox acoustic instruments.

In 2009 he was music advisor for the art textbook 'Deconstructing Product Design'-

Marvin was interviewed about his composition and music in the 2010 documentary 'In Search of Sound' which won the best documentary award at the London Underground Film Festival and is screened in an ongoing programme of international film festivals.

== Live ==
Marvin Ayres rarely performs live but has played excerpts from his albums on live studio sessions on BBC radio.

New Year's Eve 2011 Marvin played a live set broadcast from the top of BBC Bush House as the BBC World Service celebrated the New Year.

At The Curve at the Forum in Norwich, October 2011, Marvin Ayres live performance, as part of Norwich's 'Sound and Vision' Festival and Record Label Burning Shed's 10th Anniversary, was filmed for the BBC.

Ayres also played a live set at The National Portrait Gallery – as part of the event 'Reanimate Late Shift extra' .

On 15 Oct 2011 at The Roundhouse London B.E.F Music of Quality and Distinction Live, Ayres with Kate Jackson and Martyn Ware performed Ayres and Ware's arrangement of "Picture This".

== Discography ==
- Harmogram Suite
- Eccentric Deliquescence
- Sensory (DVD)
- Cycle
- Scape
- Neptune
- Cellosphere
- Ultradian Rhythms
- Circadian Rhythms
- MASK – Heavy Petal
- MASK – Technopia
- For Films Edit 4
- For Films Edit 5
- For Films Edit 6
- For Films Edit 7
- For Films Edit 9

== Films and installations ==
- Anthropomorphic-3D Sound Installation – National Portrait Gallery
- Sensory – installation at the ICA
- cycle
- Fish Eye – short film
- Lisa Williams – US TV Show
- 7 Swords of Wayland – DVD

== See also ==
- List of ambient music artists
