= Oval (musical project) =

German electronic music group

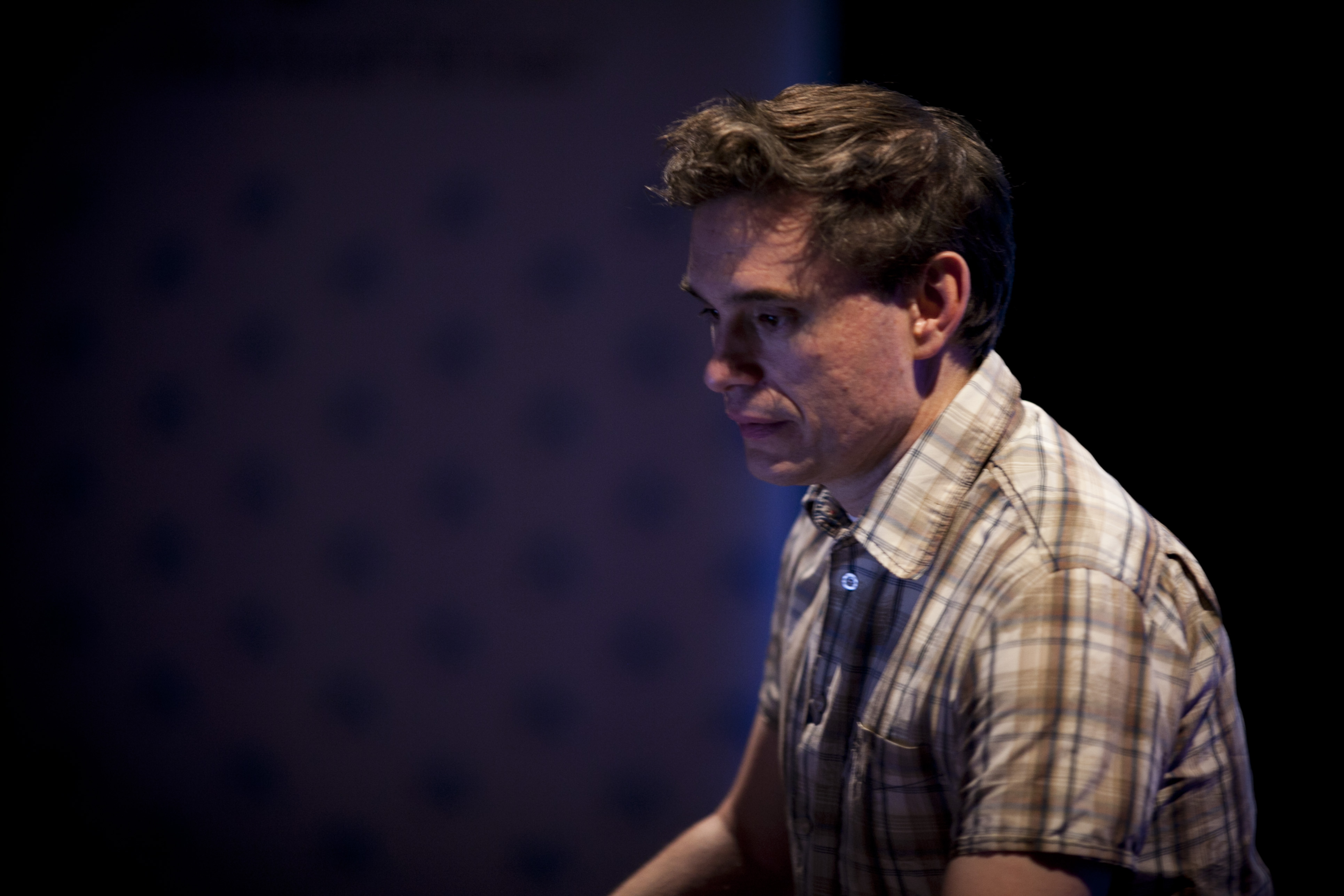
- Markus Popp in 2012

Background information
- Origin: Germany
- Genres: Glitch; ambient; IDM; experimental; microsound
- Years active: 1991–present
- Labels: Ata Tak; Mille Plateaux; Thrill Jockey; Uovooo
- Members: Markus Popp
- Past members: Sebastian Oschatz; Frank Metzger; Holger Lindmüller
- Website: oval.bandcamp.com

Oval is a German electronic music project founded in 1991 by Markus Popp, Sebastian Oschatz, Frank Metzger, and Holger Lindmüller. The group pioneered glitch music, writing on CDs to damage them and produce music with the resulting fragments. The project has been a solo venture by Popp since the departure of other members in 1995.

== History ==
Oval was founded in 1991 by Markus Popp, Sebastian Oschatz, Frank Metzger, and Holger Lindmüller. Lindmüller left about 1993, and Oval became a trio at that time. The group's debut studio album, Wohnton, was released in 1993.

Oval released Systemisch in 1994, and 94 Diskont in 1995. Oschatz and Metzger left the group in 1995, with Popp continuing under the Oval name.

After releasing Ovalcommers in 2001, Oval went on hiatus for nearly a decade. In 2010, he returned with an EP, Oh, and a studio album, O. In 2011, he released a compilation album, OvalDNA.

In 2013, Oval released Calidostópia!, a project funded by the Goethe Institute and the Cultural Foundation of the State of Bahia. Recorded over ten days in a Brazil studio, it includes collaborations with seven singers from across South America.

In 2016, Oval released a studio album, Popp, through Popp's own record label Uovooo. He released an EP, Eksploio, in 2019, and a studio album, Scis, in 2020.

In 2023, Oval released a studio album, Romantiq. It is based on an audio-visual collaborative project between Popp and digital artist Robert Seidel for the opening of the German Romantic Museum in Frankfurt.

== Other works ==
Markus Popp contributed to the creation of Gastr del Sol's 1998 studio album, Camoufleur. He is a member of the duo So, along with Eriko Toyoda. The duo released a studio album, So, in 2003. He is also a member of the duo Microstoria, along with Mouse on Mars' Jan St. Werner.

Frank Metzger was a member of the group Steno, along with Rossano Polidoro and Emiliano Romanelli. They released Second-Hand Furniture in 2007. They were active from 2003 to 2011.

Sebastian Oschatz is the founder of Meso, a German media design collective.

== Artistry ==
Disdaining the use of synthesizers, the early Oval instead deliberately mutilated CDs by writing on them with felt pens, then processed samples of fragmented sounds to create a very rhythmic electronic style.

== Awards and nominations ==
Award/organization	Year	Nominee/work	Category	Result	Ref.
Prix Ars Electronica	2001	Oval	Distinction	Won	
Prix Ars Electronica	2011	Oval	Honorable Mention	Won	
Qwartz Electronic Music Awards	2013	Oval	Best Experimental Music	Won	
Qwartz Electronic Music Awards	2015	Oval	Lifetime Achievement Award	Won	

== Discography ==
=== Studio albums ===
- Wohnton (Ata Tak, 1993)
- Systemisch (Mille Plateaux, 1994)
- 94 Diskont (Mille Plateaux, 1995)
- Dok (Thrill Jockey, 1998)
- Ovalprocess (Thrill Jockey, 2000)
- Pre/Commers (Tokuma Japan, 2001)
- Ovalcommers (Thrill Jockey, 2001)
- O (Thrill Jockey, 2010)
- Calidostópia! (Goethe Institute, 2013)
- Voa (self-released, 2013)
- Popp (Uovooo, 2016)
- Scis (Thrill Jockey, 2020)
- Ovidono (Uovooo, 2021)
- Romantiq (Thrill Jockey, 2023)

=== Compilation albums ===
- Iso Fabric (Tokuma Japan, 1997)
- OvalDNA (Shitkatapult, 2011)

=== EPs ===
- Aero Deko (Tokuma Japan, 1998)
- Szenariodisk (Thrill Jockey, 1999)
- Oh (Thrill Jockey, 2010)
- Eksploio (Thrill Jockey, 2019)

=== Compilation album appearances ===
- I Said No Doctors! ("ISND", Dymaxion Groove, 2017)

== See also ==
- List of noise musicians
