= 94 Diskont =

Studio album by Oval
- Released: 1995
- Genre: Glitch; ambient
- Length: 52:09
- Label: Mille Plateaux, Thrill Jockey

Oval chronology
Systemisch (1994)	94 Diskont (1995)	Dok (1998)

Alternative cover
- The cover of 94 Diskont used for the 1996 release and thereafter.

94 Diskont (stylised as 94diskont.) is the fourth album by German electronic music group Oval. It was released in 1995 via Mille Plateaux in Europe and in 1996 by Thrill Jockey in the United States. It was the final Oval release to feature Sebastian Oschatz and Frank Metzger. It has received critical acclaim.

== Background ==
Oval received both praise and controversy for its styling methods, such as literally deconstructing music and digital audio by using exacto knives, paint, and tape to damage the surfaces of compact discs, only to stitch the sound back together in loops of melody punctuated by the disc's physical skips. On its initial release, Select noted in their review that Oval "sound unlike any other combo" on 94 Diskont. The review went on to note that group have been described in desperation as techno and critiqued this reference stating "try dancing to the sort of erratic pulsing and hiccuping that comes over like the read-out from a dying alien's electrocardiograph".

94 Diskont was released as a companion piece to Oval's previous album, Systemisch. The album's centerpiece is "Do While," a 24-minute track originally composed for the group's 8-channel, 128-speaker modular sound installation named Wohnton (translates into home tone) in a stereo mixdown. The installation was shown throughout Europe between 1994 and 1996 on various occasions, ranging from art exhibitions to techno raves. A radio edit of the song, "Do While ⌘X", is also included on the album. The US pressing by Thrill Jockey adds two additional songs and, on vinyl, moves "Do While ⌘X" up in the running order to appear directly after "Do While", instead of closing the album.

Both US and international vinyl versions of the album came with a remix LP that contains remixes by Mouse on Mars, Scanner, Cristian Vogel, and Jim O'Rourke.

== Composition ==
94 Diskont is considered to be an album in the glitch and ambient music genres, composed from brief loops that overlap. On Pitchfork, Philip Sherburne regards that 94 Diskont was when Oval found their potential in their methods. Sherburne further notes that its sound of "bit-crushed chirps and desiccated hiccups" would be used to define glitch music. Alike the works of Erik Satie and Brian Eno, the album "both fades into the background and charges the very air around you".

== Reception ==
Professional ratings
Review scores
Source	Rating
AllMusic	5/5 stars
Select	4/5

Dave Morrison of Select gave the album a four out of five rating, first mentioning the group's unorthodox method of obtaining the sounds on the album, then noting that "this out-on-a-limb approach wouldn't mean a thing if the results weren't so brilliant." The Wire placed the album at number five on its 1995 of top albums of the year.

Ben Tausig of AllMusic awarded the album five stars and stated, "94 Diskont is undoubtedly a standout in the field of electronically advanced, glitch-heavy music." In their 1998 list of "100 Records That Set the World on Fire (While No One Was Listening)", The Wire wrote of the album: "From nothing but digital detritus, Oval construct a resonant holism of pure crystalline beauty. The balance of this disc is given over to brief excursions into textural exposition, pushing back the boundaries of sound as music."

In a 2003 feature, the webzine Pitchfork placed 94 Diskont at number 47 on its list of the top 100 albums of the 1990s. Mark Richardson of Pitchfork declared, "Sounds appear as multi-layer holograms, with both sources and ghosted copies simultaneously vying for attention, a piece of sonic trickery used to create some of the most serene and aquatic music of the '90s." Richardson would later state in a 2016 piece that 94 Diskont "was the first sound of a new future". In 2016, Pitchfork named 94 Diskont the seventh best ambient album of all time.

== Track listing ==
Original Mille Plateaux pressing
No.	Title	Length
1.	"Do While"	24:04
2.	"Store Check"	4:01
3.	"Line Extension"	3:05
4.	"Cross Selling"	6:09
5.	"Do While ⌘X"	4:50

Thrill Jockey pressing (US)
No.	Title	Length
1.	"Do While"	24:04
2.	"Store Check"	3:58
3.	"Line Extension"	3:02
4.	"Cross Selling"	6:06
5.	"Commerce Server"	4:56
6.	"Shop in Store"	4:00
7.	"Do While ⌘X"	4:50

Bonus 12"
No.	Title	Length
1.	"Do While (Jim O'Rourke)"	5:36
2.	"Do While (Scanner)"	6:53
3.	"Do While (Mouse on Mars)"	8:55
4.	"Do While (Christian Vogel)"	6:27
