= Curd Duca =

Austrian musician

Curd Duca (born 14 March 1955) is an Austrian musician, composer and producer of electronic music.

== Life and work ==
Duca has played (1982–1991) in the experimental groups "Auch wenn es seltsam klingen mag / even though it may sound strange)","8 ODER 9 / 8 OR 9" and "Skin" (accordion, guitar, vocals, percussion). Starting in 1992, he has been working mainly on solo projects with electronic instruments (analog and digital synthesizers, computer).

Duca is known for his work with audio samples that are altered, cut-up and "re-contextualised" (cut-up artist – Spin Magazine). The audio is taken from analog sources (acoustic instruments, orchestras, vocals, noise, bird calls, et al.) and mostly used without beats. Rhythmic structures are created, originally by loops, more recently by micro-cuts and improvisation with parameters of "granular synthesis". From 1996, Duca's albums were released on the experimental/techno label Mille Plateaux.

20 years later, the German label Magazine rediscovered Duca, releasing his "Waves" trilogy between 2020 and 2022.

== Albums ==
- easy listening 1
- easy listening 2
- easy listening 3
- easy listening 4
- easy listening 5 (LP, CD Normal, Bonn 1992 – 1997)
- switched-on wagner – "Richard Wagner compositions transformed beyond recognition" (CD Mille Plateaux, Frankfurt 1996)
- elevator 1
- elevator 2 (vocals: Carin Feldschmid)
- elevator 3 (vocals: Carin Feldschmid) – (LP, CD Mille Plateaux, Frankfurt 1998 – 2000)
- Waves 1 (LP, CD Magazine, 2020)
- Waves 2 (LP, CD Magazine, 2021)
- Waves 3 (LP, CD Magazine, 2022)

== Compilations ==
- Modulation & Transformation 3 (Mille Plateaux)
- Modulation & Transformation 4 (Mille Plateaux)
- Clicks & Cuts (Mille Plateaux)
- The Wire Tapper 5 (The Wire Magazine, London)
- The Eclectic Sound Of Vienna 2 (Spray)
- Mind The Gap vol 20 (Gonzo Circus)
- In memoriam – Max Brand (rhiz)
