= Systemisch =

Studio album by Oval
- Released: (Europe) 1994 (United States) 1996
- Recorded: 1993–1994
- Genre: Glitch; ambient
- Length: 59:05
- Label: Thrill Jockey (United States); THRILL032; Mille Plateaux (European Union); MP 9

Oval chronology
| Wohnton (1993) | Systemisch (1994) | 94 Diskont (1995) |

Professional ratings
Review scores
| Source | Rating |
|---|---|
| Allmusic | 2.5/5 stars |

Systemisch is the second album by the German glitch project Oval. It was released in 1994 by Mille Plateaux.

The album, like their previous vocal-focused album Wohnton, used deliberately damaged CDs as sample sources to combine an experimental glitch aesthetic with an accessible sensibility. From the point of Systemisch onward, Oval emphasized this source in their music, especially on the following album 94 Diskont (1995). In its development of the glitch aesthetic in electronic music, Systemisch influenced artists such as Autechre and Björk, the latter of which who sampled the track "Aero Deck" in the song "Unison" from her album Vespertine. The track "Textuell" was used in an Armani perfume commercial.

== Track listing ==
| No. | Title | Length |
|---|---|---|
| 1. | "Textuell" | 7:53 |
| 2. | "Aero Deck" | 4:33 |
| 3. | "The Politics of Digital Audio" | 5:21 |
| 4. | "Schöner Wissen" | 5:19 |
| 5. | "Catchy Daad" | 6:14 |
| 6. | "Mediation" | 4:22 |
| 7. | "Tonregie" | 5:05 |
| 8. | "Oval Office" | 5:08 |
| 9. | "Compact Disc" | 6:35 |
| 10. | "Post-Post" | 4:51 |
| 11. | "Gabba Nation" | 5:04 |
