= O (Oval album) =

Studio album by Oval
- Released: 6 September 2010
- Genre: Electro-acoustic
- Length: 120:34
- Label: Thrill Jockey
- Producer: Markus Popp

Oval chronology
Ovalprocess (2001)	O (2010)	Calidostópia! (2013)

O is a studio album by Oval, a project of German record producer Markus Popp. It was released on 6 September 2010 through Thrill Jockey. It received generally favorable reviews from critics.

== Background ==
O is Oval's first studio album since Ovalprocess (2001). Oval's Markus Popp learned composition and music theory and ended up recording more than 100 tracks. The album contains 70 tracks. It comes in four different covers. A music video was released for the album's song "Ah!". In a 2023 interview, Popp explained, "O was really like a second debut album."

The album was preceded by an EP, Oh, released on 15 June 2010 through Thrill Jockey. The EP's cover features artwork by Céleste Boursier-Mougenot. A music video was released for the EP's song "Kastell".

Prior to the album's release, the Ringtone EP and the Ringtone II EP were made available as free downloads. They are also called Ringtones and Ringtones II, respectively.

== Critical reception ==
Professional ratings
Aggregate scores
Source	Rating
Metacritic	71/100
Review scores
Source	Rating
AllMusic	3.5/5 stars
Cokemachineglow	55%
MusicOMH	4/5 stars
Pitchfork	6.8/10
PopMatters	6/10
Resident Advisor	3/5
Tiny Mix Tapes	3/5 stars
Under the Radar	5/10

According to the review aggregator Metacritic, O received "generally favorable reviews" based on a weighted average score of 71 out of 100 from 10 critic scores.

Colin Buttimer of BBC stated, "If the listener survives the feeling of being overwhelmed by the sheer number of compositions, their predominantly brief length and the amount of detail that can be heard in each track, O is both thrilling and rewarding." He added, "Listened to closely, each track reveals a precise and jewel-like structure, while in its totality O refuses any intimation of form that might restrict the experience of listening to it." Michael Dix of The Quietus stated, "Whilst it's true O focuses for the first time on musicianship rather than technical wizardry, the album's sound owes as much to familiar production tricks as it does to the new ingredients." He added, "Like fellow veterans Autechre, Popp seems to delight in creating noises that sound like the results of some explosive scientific experiment." Jon Pareles of The New York Times commented that "Loops and metronomic repetitions are far outnumbered by impulses and spasms, stops and starts."

Marc Weidenbaum of Disquiet placed the album at number 6 on his year-end list of the "10 Best Commercial Ambient/Electronic Albums".

== Track listing ==
All tracks are written by Markus Popp.

O (disc one) track listing
No.	Title	Length
1.	"Panorama"	3:47
2.	"Ah!"	4:03
3.	"Shhh"	1:19
4.	"Glossy"	2:40
5.	"Stop Motion"	1:07
6.	"Sky"	2:29
7.	"Beige"	1:34
8.	"Brahms Mania"	4:08
9.	"Cinematic"	2:12
10.	"Cry"	3:31
11.	"Cottage"	1:44
12.	"I Heart Musik"	3:22
13.	"Salamanca"	1:37
14.	"Dolo"	4:42
15.	"Dricas"	1:07
16.	"Cyprus"	3:16
17.	"Vessel"	1:50
18.	"Dynamo"	3:07
19.	"Finis"	1:32
20.	"Emocor"	2:19

O (disc two) track listing
No.	Title	Length
1.	"Citybike"	1:15
2.	"Oslo"	0:54
3.	"Ij"	0:53
4.	"Rivo"	2:05
5.	"Pomp"	0:49
6.	"Blinky"	1:15
7.	"Parallax"	0:47
8.	"Koral"	1:42
9.	"Kolor"	1:03
10.	"Auto Matic"	1:36
11.	"Dream Over"	1:28
12.	"Pastell"	1:31
13.	"Magnify"	0:47
14.	"Drift"	1:58
15.	"Allover"	1:33
16.	"Derby"	1:41
17.	"Flax"	1:22
18.	"Bergen Best"	1:49
19.	"Matinée"	1:42
20.	"Kukicha"	2:10
21.	"6 AM"	1:29
22.	"Flamingo"	1:11
23.	"Rivo II"	0:58
24.	"Goodbye"	1:27
25.	"Fontan"	1:28
26.	"Co-Echo"	0:35
27.	"Stop Motion II"	1:21
28.	"Vitesse"	1:20
29.	"September"	0:47
30.	"Voilà"	1:21
31.	"Vegas Top"	1:20
32.	"Expo"	1:04
33.	"Lonely"	0:31
34.	"Java"	2:15
35.	"Klack"	0:32
36.	"Project Evergreen"	1:05
37.	"Rainyday"	0:43
38.	"Big City Nights"	0:45
39.	"Rosammie"	1:03
40.	"Gallo"	1:08
41.	"May Tea"	0:58
42.	"Chronograph"	0:35
43.	"Jank"	0:58
44.	"Breezy"	1:31
45.	"Press"	0:36
46.	"Form Faktor"	1:05
47.	"Terminal"	1:03
48.	"Karo"	1:06
49.	"Swiss Summer"	1:10
50.	"Happyend"	1:22

Expanded edition additional tracks
No.	Title	Length
1.	"Alpen Wireframe"	1:01
2.	"Wonda"	2:16
3.	"Intensify"	0:48
4.	"Encore"	3:04
5.	"1983"	1:00
6.	"Haff"	2:50

== Personnel ==
Credits adapted from liner notes.

- Markus Popp – production
- Frieda Luczak – design
