= Scis (album) =

Studio album by Oval
- Released: 17 January 2020
- Length: 44:59
- Label: Thrill Jockey
- Producer: Markus Popp

Oval chronology
Popp (2016)	Scis (2020)	Ovidono (2021)

Scis is a studio album by Oval, a project of German record producer Markus Popp. It was released on 17 January 2020 through Thrill Jockey. It received generally favorable reviews from critics.

== Background ==
Scis is Oval's first studio album since Popp (2016). In a 2023 interview, Oval's Markus Popp explained, "With Popp and Scis, it was kind of like a club critique, me using club tropes, club techniques, club tricks." A music video was released for the song "Improg". Prior to the album's release, the Eksploio EP was released on 8 November 2019 through Thrill Jockey.

== Critical reception ==
Professional ratings
Aggregate scores
Source	Rating
Metacritic	76/100
Review scores
Source	Rating
AllMusic	4/5 stars
Exclaim!	7/10
Pitchfork	7.0/10

According to the review aggregator Metacritic, Scis received "generally favorable reviews" based on a weighted average score of 76 out of 100 from 4 critic scores.

Paul Simpson of AllMusic commented that Scis is "essentially a melodic whirlpool of acoustic tones, bombastic beats, and darting, buzzing bass lines." He added, "Just as vibrant and full of wonder as Popp, Scis is another imaginative, unpredictable world of sound." Mark Richardson of Bandcamp Daily stated, "Beats are often out front on Scis, but Popp's drum programming isn't tied to any particular musical idiom." He added, "Though the music is tethered to a steady pulse, percussion, for Popp, is ultimately another tool for density and space."

Miles Bowe of Pitchfork commented that "Scis initially picks up where its relatively club-oriented 2016 predecessor left off, but gradually unspools into something new." Daniel Sylvester of Exclaim! stated, "Scis demonstrates that, 27 years into his recording career, Markus Popp is still managing to come off forward-thinking and forward-sounding."

== Track listing ==
All tracks are written by Markus Popp.

Scis track listing
No.	Title	Length
1.	"Twirror"	5:00
2.	"Robussy"	4:40
3.	"Fluoresso"	4:48
4.	"Pushhh"	4:44
5.	"Impecco"	4:32
6.	"Cozzmo"	4:40
7.	"Improg"	4:16
8.	"Mikk"	3:52
9.	"Oxagon"	4:08
10.	"Piqqo"	4:08
Total length:		44:59

== Personnel ==
Credits adapted from liner notes.

- Markus Popp – arrangement, production
- Sveta Rybkina – cover design
