= Okay (band) =

German pop band

Okay (sometimes also spelt as O.K.) were a pop group from Frankfurt, Germany.

Their 1987 single "Okay!" reached No. 2 on the German music chart in 1988 and No. 1 on the Austrian chart.

== Members ==
- Marcus Gabler (a.k.a. Marc Gable) - vocals, keyboards, tapes, mixing
- Nikki - drums, backing vocals
- Robin Otis - bass, backing vocals
- Christian Berg - keyboards, backing vocals

== Discography ==
=== Albums ===
- 1989: Bang!, CBS

=== Singles ===
- 1987: "Okay!"
- 1988: "E-D-U-C-A-T-I-O-N"
- 1989: "The Wild, Wild, Western"
- 1990: "1.2.3.4. Une Grande Affaire"
- 1991: "World of Illusion"
