= Snd (band) =

Sheffield-based electronic music duo

snd
- Origin: Sheffield, UK
- Genres: Glitch
- Years active: 1998–present
- Labels: Mille Plateaux; Raster-Noton
- Members: Mark Fell; Mat Steel
- Website: www.makesnd.com

snd are Mark Fell and Mat Steel, a pair of Sheffield DJs and musicians whose work has been described as glitch. Naming their project after the extension often used for computer sound files, Fell and Steel are both computer programmers. During 1998-99, they debuted with the "Tplay" single and Newtables EP on their own .snd label. In July 1999, Mille Plateaux released the debut album, Makesnd Cassette, with Stdiosnd Types following one year later. Their most recent album, Atavism, was released in 2009 by Raster-Noton. In 2014, snd self published an extended and remastered version of their debut release Tplay.

== Discography ==
=== Albums ===
- Tplay (Snd, 1998)
- Makesnd Cassette (Mille Plateaux, 1999)
- Newtables (Snd, 1999)
- Travelog (Snd, 1999)
- Stdiosnd Types (referred to as Stdio on the front cover; Mille Plateaux, 2000)
- Tender Love (Mille Plateaux, 2002)
- Atavism (Raster-Noton, 2009)

=== Singles and EPs ===
- "Systems Medley" / "Planets" (City Centre Offices, 2000)
- "Untitled" (Qoob, 2007)
- "4,5,6" (Snd, 2008)
- "Vandyk-k Integ Paradise" (DS93, 2010)
- "15/16" (split with NHK; Pan, 2012)
