= Kiwa (artist) =

Estonian composer, artist and writer

Kiwa (born September 11, 1975) is an Estonian artist, composer, curator, publisher, and writer.

== Education ==
He studied sculpture at Estonian Art Academy and philosophy at Tartu University.

== Career ==
He practises experimental and interdisciplinary art, intertwining performance art, text, sound, visual, and organizational activity. Kiwa has participated in over 400 exhibitions and festivals worldwide, establishing himself as a pioneer in contemporary experimental art since the 1990s. His work blends different media, functioning as a hypertextual research of meaning-making, cultural codes, and personal and collective myths.

In addition to his work in visual arts, Kiwa is also active as an experimental musician under the name Kiwanoid. He has released albums on the German label Mille Plateaux and the Estonian label Glitch Please.

In 2014, he founded;paranoia publishing, which focuses on "experimental and non-creative literature, bibliomorphs, multiples, and text-based art."

== Musical Releases ==
Kiwa has been involved in experimental music since the late 1980s. In the 1990s, he played in some of the fastest punk bands in Estonia before transitioning to free electronica in the early 2000s, focusing on creating unique sound compositions.

=== Albums ===
- Enter the Untitled (2021, Mille Plateaux)
- Vanatühi (2024, Mille Plateaux, Glitch Please)

== Publications ==
=== Books ===
- Kummiliimiallikad / Sources of Rubber Glue (Tänapäev, 2021) ISBN 9789916171110
- nothing (;paranoia publishing, 2017)
- Spiral of Void (;paranoia publishing, 2017) ISBN 9789-9499-75-98-3
- Self-Portrait with the Unknown / Autoportree tundmatuga (Tartu Art Museum, 2015) ISBN 9789949951758
- Lennuki kõrval toas (;paranoia publishing, 2014) ISBN 978-9949-9519-7-0
- enter the untitled (Paranoia, 2014) ISBN 978-9949-30-970-2
- Tekstilääts : Kangelasema toitepiim (ID Salong 2006) ISBN 9949-13-745-4
- metabor: skid mark of the force before the shape (with Kaarel Kurismaa, 2005)
- Roboti tee on nihe / Salatühik (Eesti Kunstimuuseum, 2004) ISBN 9985-9527-5-8
- Lastehaiglast põgenenud mänguasjad (Eesti Keele Sihtasutus, 2002) ISBN 9985-811-89-5
