= Glitch (music) =

Electronic music genre

- Stylistic origins: Electronic; sound art; noise; techno; ambient; experimental; avant-garde
- Cultural origins: 1990s, United Kingdom, Germany, Japan
- Derivative forms: Folktronica; indietronica

Subgenres
- Glitch hop; glitch pop

Other topics
- IDM; microsound; post-rock; post-Internet music; botanica; glitchcore

Glitch is a genre of experimental electronic music that emerged in the 1990s, distinguished by the deliberate use of glitches in audio media and other sonic artifacts. The genre takes its sounds from malfunctions in recording equipment and digital electronics, and its practitioners work from a philosophical position that treats errors and failures as compositional material rather than problems to be corrected. In Computer Music Journal, composer and writer Kim Cascone classified glitch as a subgenre of electronica and used the term post-digital to describe the glitch aesthetic.

Production in the genre evolved from the physical manipulation of damaged hardware in the 1990s toward fully software-based simulation of those same failure states in the 2000s. Key albums including Oval's Systemisch (1994), Fennesz's Endless Summer (2001), and the Clicks & Cuts compilation series released by Mille Plateaux from 2000 onward are widely regarded as landmark works in the genre's development.

Alongside the core genre, several derivative styles developed over time. Glitch hop fuses glitch production techniques with the rhythmic structure of hip-hop and emerged in the late 1990s before undergoing a significant commercial crossover with electronic dance music (EDM) in the late 2000s. Microhouse deploys glitch elements within house music frameworks and was identified and named as a distinct genre by music journalist Philip Sherburne in a July 2001 article for The Wire. Glitch's influence extended across multiple adjacent genres and continued to surface in experimental and ambient music well into the 2010s and beyond.

== History ==
=== Precursors ===
The origins of the glitch aesthetic can be traced to the early 20th century with Luigi Russolo's Futurist manifesto L'arte dei rumori (The Art of Noises) published in 1913, which became the basis of noise music. He constructed mechanical noise generators, which he named intonarumori, and wrote multiple compositions to be played by them, including Risveglio di una città (Awakening of a City) and Convegno di automobili e aeroplani (Meeting of Automobiles and Airplanes). In 1914, a riot broke out at one of his performances in Milan, Italy.

Christian Marclay began in 1979 to use mutilated vinyl records to create sound collages, while Yasunao Tone used damaged CDs in his Techno Eden performance of 1985. The 1992 album It Was a Dark and Stormy Night by Nicolas Collins included a composition featuring a string quartet playing alongside the stuttering sound of skipping CDs. Yuzo Koshiro and Motohiro Kawashima's electronic soundtrack for the 1994 video game Streets of Rage 3 used automatically randomized sequences to generate "unexpected and odd" experimental sounds.

=== 1990s: Emergence ===
Glitch music properly originated as a distinct movement in Germany and Japan during the 1990s, with musical works and labels (especially Mille Plateaux) of Achim Szepanski in Germany, and works of Ryoji Ikeda in Japan.

Nuno Canavarro's album Plux Quba, released in 1988, incorporated pristine electroacoustic sounds that resembled early glitch. Oval's debut album Wohnton, published in 1993, helped define the emerging genre by adding ambient aesthetics. The following year, Oval's Systemisch (1994) became one of the genre's first landmark records, using sound taken from deliberately damaged CDs to combine an experimental glitch aesthetic with a more accessible sensibility. The album influenced the sound of artists including Autechre and Björk, who sampled the track "Aero Deck" on her album Vespertine. Oval's follow-up 94 Diskont (1995) was described by Philip Sherburne of Pitchfork as a Rosetta Stone for the mid-1990s glitch movement. Writing in The Wire in 1998, the album was included in their list of "100 Records That Set the World on Fire (While No One Was Listening)", with the magazine describing it as constructing "a resonant holism of pure crystalline beauty" from digital detritus.

The earliest documented uses of the term glitch as applied to music include electronic duo Autechre's song "Glitch", released in 1994, and experimental electronic group ELpH's album Worship the Glitch, published in 1995.

=== 2000s: Codification and proliferation ===
As digital audio workstations and laptop-based production became widespread in the early 2000s, glitch moved from the domain of hardware manipulation into software simulation of the same failure states. The Clicks & Cuts compilation series, released by Mille Plateaux from 2000 onward, documented and helped codify the movement. AllMusic described the first volume as both an investigation of the glitch aesthetic and the style's "official genesis," and Pitchfork placed it at number 21 on its 2017 list of the 50 best IDM albums of all time.

Alongside the Mille Plateaux scene, a loose circle centered on American duo Matmos and the San Francisco label Tigerbeat 6, led by producer kid606, brought a more confrontational sensibility to glitch production. Music journalist Simon Reynolds described this circle, which included Lesser and Blectum from Blechdom, as working from the innovations of Aphex Twin, Autechre, Squarepusher, and Oval while introducing a more aggressive approach to live performance.

Fennesz's album Endless Summer, released on the Mego label in July 2001, brought the genre renewed critical attention. Recorded on a laptop, a single microphone, and a few guitars and pedals, the album was named among the best of the decade by Pitchfork, Fact, and Resident Advisor, and Pitchfork placed it at number 22 on its 2017 list of the best ambient albums of all time. Writing in Resident Advisor in 2007, Joshua Meggitt observed that compared to Fennesz's work, much of the surrounding glitch scene had produced music that was po-faced, cerebral and cold, and that Fennesz had invested the laptop with a warmth and emotional accessibility previously associated with acoustic instruments.

== Production techniques ==
The central philosophical distinction in glitch production is between accidental and deliberate failure. In its earliest form, the genre relied on the physical manipulation of damaged hardware. Yasunao Tone's "wounded" CDs used small bits of semi-transparent tape placed on disc surfaces to interrupt data reading, while Oval's Markus Popp used exacto knives, paint, and tape to damage compact disc surfaces before reconstructing the resulting sounds into loops punctuated by physical skips. Nicolas Collins modified an electric guitar to act as a resonator for electrical signals and adapted a CD player to allow recordings to be altered during live performance.

As digital audio workstations became the dominant production environment in the late 1990s and 2000s, the genre's techniques migrated into software. Artists began using digital production tools to splice together small sample cuts from previously recorded works, integrating these fragments with glitches, clicks, and scratches deployed in place of or alongside traditional percussion. This shift raised a persistent question about the nature of the genre: whether glitch should be understood as the corruption of intact music through post-production processing, or as the composition of new work from digital detritus as raw material. Oval's Popp, in a 2013 interview with Fact Magazine, described his approach as the latter, distinguishing between taking "seemingly unusable fragments" as compositional source material versus applying glitch aesthetics to otherwise intact music as a stylistic overlay.

Contemporary glitch production is largely carried out using digital audio software. Popular tools include trackers such as Jeskola Buzz and Renoise, and modular environments including Reaktor, Ableton Live, Reason, AudioMulch, Bidule, SuperCollider, FLStudio, Max/MSP, Pure Data, and ChucK. Some artists also use digital synthesizers such as the Clavia Nord Modular G2 and Elektron's Machinedrum and Monomachine.

== Glitch hop ==
Glitch hop is a subgenre that emerged in the late 1990s, fusing glitch production techniques with the rhythmic and structural conventions of hip-hop. The genre is characterized by mid-tempo beats typically ranging from 80 to 130 beats per minute (BPM), the use of chopped-up samples, stuttering digital effects, distorted basslines, and glitch sounds deployed in place of or alongside conventional percussion.

=== Origins ===
The genre took shape around 1997, with the early work of Push Button Objects on the Chocolate Industries label among its founding examples. Producers including Machinedrum, Prefuse 73, and Dabrye were among the early figures to fuse IDM-derived glitch techniques with instrumental hip-hop beats. The approach drew on the rhythmic sensibility associated with producer J Dilla, combining it with the mechanical percussion textures of IDM. The genre grew in prominence through the early 2000s and became associated with the Los Angeles beat scene centered around the Low End Theory club night, established in 2006 by producer Daddy Kev. Artists affiliated with that scene, including Flying Lotus and his Brainfeeder label, Nosaj Thing, and Shlohmo, incorporated elements of mid-2000s dubstep and jazz into the developing sound.

=== Evolution and EDM crossover ===
By the late 2000s, the genre underwent a significant shift. As dubstep rose to commercial prominence in the United States, many glitch hop producers began incorporating its bass-driven aesthetic alongside elements of the drum and bass subgenre neurofunk. Artists including The Glitch Mob, GRiZ, KOAN Sound, and Pretty Lights became associated with this more EDM-oriented iteration of the genre, which retained the glitch hop name despite diverging substantially from its hip-hop roots. MusicRadar has noted that glitch techniques in this context appear across a wide range of contemporary electronic genres, from pop and techno to neo-classical production.

=== Notable artists ===
The Glitch Mob, a Los Angeles trio comprising edIT (Edward Ma), Boreta (Justin Boreta), and Ooah (Josh Mayer), released the album Drink the Sea in 2010 and brought the genre to mainstream audiences through remixes appearing in film trailers and television advertisements. New Zealand producer Opiuo (Oscar Davey-Wright) is recognized for integrating funk and psychedelic elements into the genre and for translating his electronic productions into live band settings. English duo KOAN Sound, composed of Will Weeks and Jim Bastow, began as dubstep producers before moving into glitch hop and neurohop, and have remixed tracks by artists including Ed Sheeran and Skrillex. Other artists associated with the genre include David Tipper, Pretty Lights (Derek Vincent Smith), GRiZ, Mr. Bill, K+Lab, COPYCATT and Flying Lotus.

== Related genres ==
=== Microhouse ===
Microhouse is a genre that emerged from the intersection of glitch and house music, in which click and noise elements are deployed within a four-on-the-floor rhythmic framework. The term was coined by music journalist Philip Sherburne in a July 2001 article for The Wire, describing what Sherburne called "the spectral, hypnotic interpretation of classic Chicago grooves" emerging on labels including Kompakt, Perlon, Playhouse, and the Mille Plateaux family of imprints. German producer Jan Jelinek, recording as Farben, was among the artists Sherburne specifically cited in coining the term; Jelinek's label Faitiche notes that Sherburne subsequently named this style of production Microhouse. Other key artists in the genre include Finnish producer Luomo, whose album Vocalcity (2000) is considered a hallmark of the style, and Canadian producer Akufen.

=== Glitch pop and folktronica ===
Glitch aesthetics entered indie and popular music through glitch pop and folktronica, in which artists incorporated digital error sounds and IDM production elements alongside acoustic instrumentation and song-based structures. Björk's sampling of Oval's Systemisch on her 2001 album Vespertine is one documented example of this crossover. The ongoing influence of glitch production techniques in experimental and ambient music has ensured that artists working well outside the original scene continue to draw on foundational glitch methods as part of their sonic vocabulary.

== Landmark albums ==
The following albums are widely cited in music criticism as central to the development and codification of the glitch genre.

- Oval – Systemisch (1994, Mille Plateaux): among the first records to establish a glitch aesthetic built from damaged-CD source material; influenced Autechre and Björk.
- Oval – 94 Diskont (1995, Mille Plateaux): described by Pitchfork as a Rosetta Stone for the mid-1990s glitch movement; included in The Wire's 1998 list of 100 essential records.
- Various Artists – Clicks & Cuts (2000, Mille Plateaux): the first volume in the Clicks & Cuts Series; described by AllMusic as the glitch genre's "official genesis" and placed at number 21 on Pitchfork's 2017 list of the 50 best IDM albums of all time.
- Fennesz – Endless Summer (2001, Mego): placed at number 22 on Pitchfork's 2017 list of the best ambient albums of all time; named album of the decade by Pitchfork, Fact, and Resident Advisor.

== See also ==
- Circuit bending
- Clicks & Cuts Series
- Drill 'n' bass
- Experimental pop
- Generative music
- Hyperpop
- Microsound
- Noise music
- Raster-Noton
