= Mille Plateaux (record label) =

German record label

- Founded: 1994
- Founder: Achim Szepanski
- Genre: Minimal techno, glitch, electronic music, Noise music, Ambient music
- Country of origin: Germany
- Location: Frankfurt (1994–2024)
- Official website: https://www.mille-plateaux.com/label-mille-plateaux

Mille Plateaux is a German record label founded in 1994 by Achim Szepanski in Frankfurt, as a sublabel of Force Inc. Music Works. Its releases in the fields of minimal techno, glitch music and other experimental electronic music have a lasting influence.

== History ==
=== Origins and Activities (1994–2004) ===
The name Mille Plateaux was taken from Mille Plateaux (A Thousand Plateaus), a philosophy book by Gilles Deleuze and Félix Guattari, published in 1980. Their idea of the rhizome has been applied as the label's concept of publishing a large variety of forward thinking electronic music from different contexts.

In 2000, Mille Plateaux released their Clicks & Cuts Series, which featured both Mille Plateaux and non-Mille Plateaux glitch music artists. This series is widely perceived to be a cornerstone of glitch music.

=== Bankruptcy and Various Revivals (2004–2011) ===
In early 2004, Mille Plateaux's parent company Force Inc. went bankrupt due to the collapse of Germany's main independent music distributor, EFA-Medien. Mille Plateaux and other Force Inc. Music Works owned labels also folded at that time. The label was revived briefly in late 2004 under the name MillePlateauxMedia, with four releases. In 2005, two releases were made by RAI STREUBEL MUSIC S.L. on the label Supralinear with the note "by Mille Plateaux". In 2006, Mille Plateaux (along with the other former Force Inc. Music Works labels Force Inc. and Force Tracks) was taken over by the Berlin-based company Disco Inc. Ltd., who only released two CD albums.

In March 2008, Mille Plateaux was acquired by Total Recall, an online store and distributor for used and new music. Their owner Marcus Gabler, known as singer of the band Okay, became the A&R manager. Mille Plateaux relaunched its activities on 7 May 2010, with three new albums but halted activity in 2011. In 2018, Total Recall was dissolved.

=== Relaunch by Achim Szepanski (2018–2024) ===
Its original founder Achim Szepanski successfully reactivated the label's activity in 2018. Since then it has released music digitally as well as on vinyl, CD, cassette and USB stick. Among a broad range of new and younger artists, Thomas Köner, Porter Ricks and Cristian Vogel have returned to the label. The curatorial focus is centered around the concept of Ultrablackness:

"Anonymous, dark, black, hidden, concealed, encrypted, opaque, undercover, incomprehensible: Ultrablack of Music dares the exodus and listens to those forces and sounds that tell of the unheard in music. Sound is the vibration, resonance and diffraction of waves in the black cosmos."

Bearing the same title, the book "Ultrablack of Music" contains texts by writers and artists such as Benjamin Noys, Frederic Neyrat, Marcus Schmickler and Holger Schulze. It was accompanied by a compilation of 34 tracks.

In September 2024, Szepanski died at the age of 67. The label’s final release before Szepanski’s passing was "Vanatühi" by Estonian multidisciplinary artist Kiwanoid. The album was released in collaboration with the Estonian label Glitch Please and was made available in multiple formats, including vinyl, cassette, digital, and even floppy disk.

== Former sublabels ==
- Ritornell – started 1999, released rather abstract, sound art works of experimental music
- Cluster – started 2010, released experimental ambient music
- Organic – started 2010, released experimental / progressive, non-electronic (sounding) music
- Force Intel (sister label) – started 2010, released less experimental electronic music, often referred to as IDM

== Artists ==
Some artists released on the label prior to 2004:

- Akufen
- Alva Noto
- Alec Empire
- Andreas Tilliander
- Antye Greie-Fuchs
- Autopoieses (Ekkehard Ehlers and Sebastian Meissner)
- Christophe Charles
- Cristian Vogel
- Curd Duca
- Dälek
- Dean Roberts
- DJ Spooky
- DJ Vadim
- Donnacha Costello
- Frank Bretschneider
- Hanayo
- High Priest of the Antipop Consortium
- Ice
- Jamie Liddell
- Jammin' Unit
- Jetone
- Jim O'Rourke
- Justin Broadrick
- Kevin Martin
- Kid 606
- Kouhei Matsunaga
- Luomo (aka Vladislav Delay)
- Marcus Schmickler
- Marvin Ayres
- Masami Akita
- Max Eastley
- Microstoria
- Mouse On Mars
- Mr. Thing
- Noto
- Oval
- Panacea
- Peter Rehberg
- Porter Ricks
- Random Inc (a.k.a. Sebastian Meissner)
- Robert Babicz
- Ryoji Ikeda
- Safety Scissors
- Scanner
- Si Begg
- snd
- Sophie Rimheden
- Spectre
- Stewart Walker
- Suba
- Suphala
- Techno Animal
- Terre Thaemlitz
- Thomas Köner
- Twerk
- Ultra-red
- Vladislav Delay
- Wolfgang Voigt (best known as Gas)
- Yasunao Tone

Some artists released on the label (or its substitutes) between 2004 and 2010:

- Thomas Köner
- Eight Frozen Modules
- Edith Progue
- Kit Krash
- Ran Slavin
- Bizz Circuits

Some artists released under Marcus Gabler in 2010–2011:

- Ametsub
- Craig Vear
- Gultskra Artikler
- Kabutogani
- Klive
- Wyatt Keusch

Some artists released since the relaunch in 2018:

- Bienoise
- Baransu
- Cristian Vogel
- Deepchild
- Thomas Köner
- Porter Ricks
- Network Ensemble
- Simona Zamboli
- woulg
- DeRayling
- Gianluca Iadema
- John-Robin Bold
- Andy Cowling
- Kiwanoid

== See also ==
- Clicks & Cuts Series
- Glitch (music)
- List of record labels
