= Wolfgang Voigt =

German musical artist

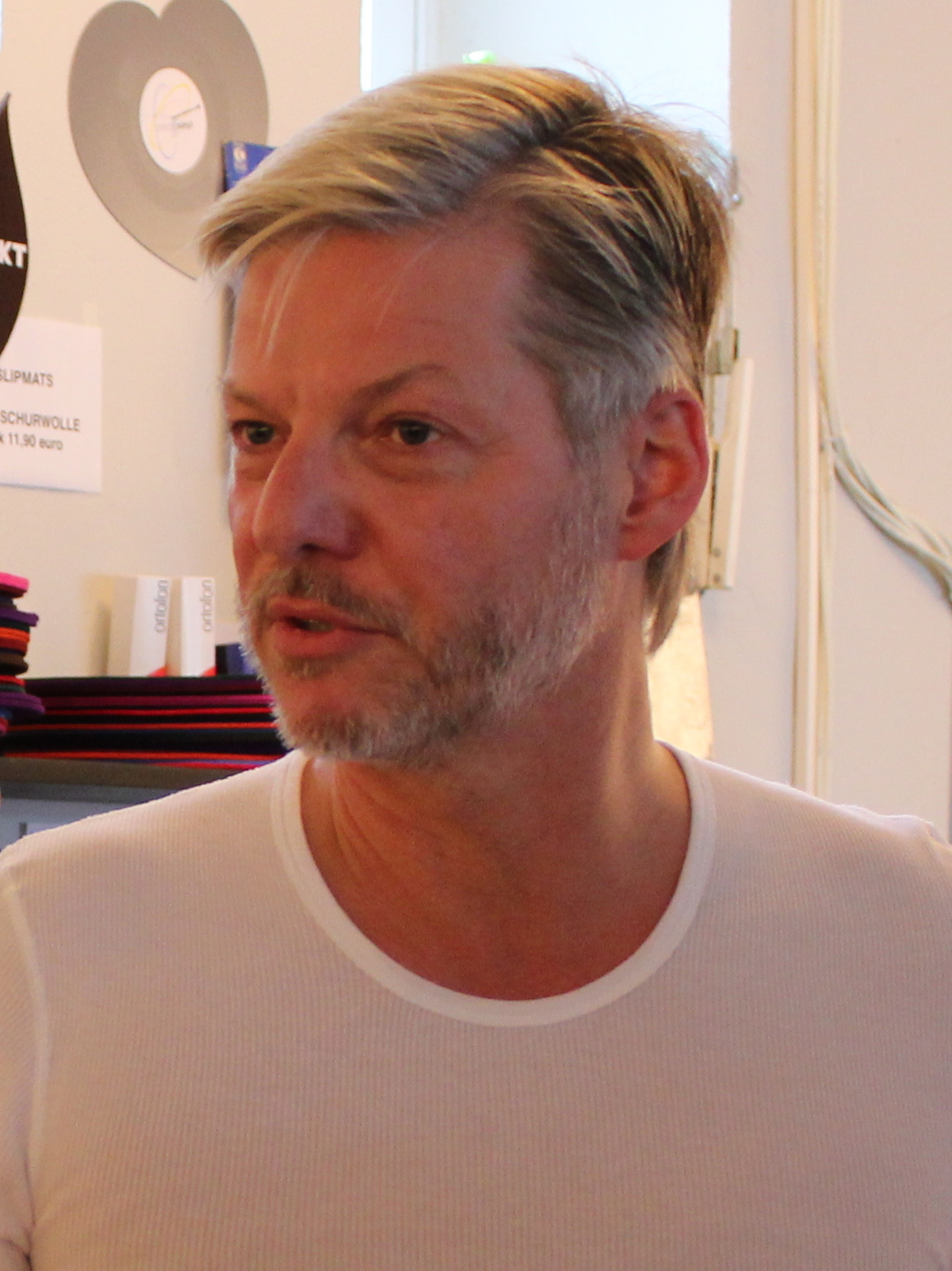
- Voigt in 2012

Background information
- Also known as: Gas; Mike Ink
- Origin: Cologne, Germany
- Genre: Minimal techno
- Occupations: DJ; record producer
- Years active: 1988–present
- Member of: Burger/Ink

Wolfgang Voigt (born 1961) is a German electronic music DJ and producer from Cologne, known for his output under various aliases, such as Gas. He signed with numerous record labels, including Warp, Harvest, Raster-Noton, Force Inc, Astral Industries and Kompakt. The latter was co-founded by Voigt alongside Michael Mayer and Jürgen Paape. He is considered one of the most influential minimal techno artists.

== Life and career ==
Together with his brother Reinhard Voigt (alias Sweet Reinhard, Kron and Pentax), Wolfgang Voigt is considered one of the founders and most influential artists of the minimal techno scene. With Jörg Burger (The Bionaut, The Modernist) he was influenced by the early acid house in 1988, when both spent some time in London. Voigt and Burger founded the label Trance Atlantic.

He started to produce under the moniker Mike Ink with the Acid EP The Dialogue being his first release. In 1993 Voigt, his brother Reinhard, Jörg Burger and Jürgen Paape founded the record store "Delirium" in Cologne, which later became Kompakt. In the same year he also started Profan. Later followed other imprints such as Kreisel 99 or Auftrieb.

Since the early 1990s he has released over 160 albums, along with dozens of EPs, box sets, singles and remixes, under more than 30 different monikers.

=== Aliases and projects ===
Voigt is known for over 30 aliases and projects. Of these, his best known is arguably Gas.

Other names under which Voigt has released music include, but are not limited to, All, Auftrieb, Brom, C.K. Decker, Centrifugal Force, Crocker, Dextro NRG, Dieter Gorny, Digital, Dom, Doppel, Filter, Freiland, Fuchsbau, Gelb, Grungerman, Kafkatrax, Love Inc., M:I:5, Mike Ink, Mint, Panthel, Popacid, Riss, RX7, Split Inc., Strass, Studio 1, Tal, Vinyl Countdown, W.V., Wassermann, and X-Lvis.

In 2025, Pitchfork reviewed his album Life's a Gas (1996) released under the name Love Inc., rating it 8.6 out of 10.
