= Total 9 =

Kompakt: Total 9

Compilation album by Various Artists
- Released: 18 August 2008
- Genre: Microhouse, minimal techno
- Length: 2:36:53
- Label: Kompakt

Kompakt Total series chronology
Total 8 (2007)	Kompakt: Total 9 (2008)	Total 10 (2009)

Professional ratings
Review scores
Source	Rating
Resident Advisor	4/5 stars
Pitchfork Media	6.9/10 link

Kompakt: Total 9 or Total 9 was released on 18 August 2008. The album is the ninth installment of the Cologne-based microhouse label's annual compilation of vinyl releases and exclusives from its biggest artists and most promising newcomers.

== Track listing ==
=== Disc One ===
1. Justus Köhncke – "No Thanks for the Add" (6:31)
2. DJ Koze – "Zou Zou" (7:52)
3. Superpitcher vs. The Congosound – "Say I’m Your Number One (Superpitcher Remix)" (8:11)
4. Jürgen Paape – "Come Into My Life" (7:30)
5. Matias Aguayo – "Minimal" (6:34)
6. Supermayer – "Hey Hotties!" (6:35)
7. Jörg Burger – "Modernism Begins At Home" (5:00)
8. Superpitcher – "Disko ! (You Don’t Care)" (7:17)
9. Partial Arts – "Telescope" (8:30)
10. Thomas Fehlmann – "With Wings" (6:55)
11. Burger/Voigt – “Wand Aus Klang” (7:32)

=== Disc Two ===
1. Dubshape – "Droplets (Early Night Mix)" (7:42)
2. Jonas Bering – "Can’t Stop Loving You" (6:01)
3. Robert Babicz – "Don’t Look Back" (7:20)
4. Nightguy – "Pretty Face" (7:43)
5. Gui Boratto – "Anunciación” (6:25)
6. The Rice Twins – "The Signifier" (5:59)
7. Nicolas Stefan – "Time Is Over" (7:04)
8. kaito – "Everlasting Dub" (9:39)
9. SCSI-9 – "Another Day Acid" (7:58)
10. Maxime Dangles – "Tulipa" (7:29)
11. Freiland – "Geduld" (5:06)
