= Total 10 =

Kompakt: Total 10

Compilation album by Various Artists
- Released: 10 August 2009
- Genre: Microhouse, minimal techno
- Length: 2:26:58
- Label: Kompakt

Kompakt Total series chronology
Total 9 (2008)	Kompakt: Total 10 (2009)	Total 11 (2010)

Professional ratings
Review scores
Source	Rating
Allmusic	link
Pitchfork Media	7.1/10 link

Kompakt: Total 10 or Total 10 was released on 10 August, 2009. The album is the tenth installment of the Cologne-based microhouse label's annual compilation of vinyl releases and exclusives from its biggest artists and most promising newcomers.

== Track listing ==
=== Disc One ===
1. DJ Koze – "40 Love" (6:58)
2. Thomas & Mayer – "Total 9" (6:27)
3. Justus Köhncke – "(It’s Gonna Be) Alright (Dirk Leyers Remix)" (9:59)
4. Shumi – "The Wind and the Sea" (7:33)
5. Sam Taylor-Wood & Pet Shop Boys – "I’m In Love With a German Film Star (Gui Boratto Remix)" (7:25)
6. Ada & Raz Ohara – "Lovestoned" (7:08)
7. Coma – "Sum" (7:23)
8. Gui Boratto – "No Turning Back (Wighnomy Brothers Likkalize Love Rekksmi)" (7:15)
9. Nicolas Stefan – "Closer" (7:01)
10. Jonas Bering – "Who Is Who" (5:28)

=== Disc Two ===
1. Justus Köhncke – "Give It to Me Easy" (8:23)
2. Matias Aguayo – "Walter Neff" (5:49)
3. Mayburg – "Each and Every Day (feat. Ada)" (5:12)
4. Gotye – "Heart’s a Mess (Supermayer Remix)" (8:13)
5. The Field – "The More I Do (Thomas Fehlmann Mix)” (8:02)
6. Burger/Voigt – “Wand Aus Klang (It's a Fine Line Remix)” (9:15)
7. Wasserman – "Berg und Tal (Instrumental)" (6:45)
8. Jürgen Paape – "Ofterschwang" (4:33)
9. Reinhard Voigt – "Am Limit" (7:30)
10. Geoffroy Dewandeler & Oliver Grégoire – "Ignored Folklore" (6:25)
11. Pachanga Boys – "Fiesta Forever" (4:14)
