= Total 11 =

Kompakt: Total 11

Compilation album by Various Artists
- Released: 23 August 2010
- Genre: Microhouse, minimal techno
- Length: 2:33:00
- Label: Kompakt

Kompakt Total series chronology
Total 10 (2009)	Kompakt: Total 11 (2010)	Total 12 (2011)

Professional ratings
Review scores
Source	Rating
Pitchfork Media	6.2/10 link

Kompakt: Total 11 or Total 11 was released on 23 August 2010. The album is the eleventh installment of the Cologne-based microhouse label's annual compilation of vinyl releases and exclusives from its biggest artists and most promising newcomers.

== Track listing ==
=== Disc One ===
1. DJ Koze – "Der Wallach" (4:33)
2. Jatoma – "Helix" (7:49)
3. Jürgen Paape – "Mensch und Maschine" (4:57)
4. Ada & Heiko Voss- "Walk Over" (4:08)
5. Matias Aguayo – "Rollerskate (Sanfuentes & Thunder's Version)" (5:36)
6. Superpitcher – "Lapdance" (6:57)
7. Justus Köhncke – "I Wouldn't Wanna Be Like You" (3:18)
8. Mugwump – "Losing Game" (7:17)
9. It's A Fine Line – "Eins Fine Grind" (4:22)
10. The Field – "Caroline" (5:05)
11. S.O.G – “Silbereisen” (4:50)
12. Sébastien Bouchet – “St. Anne” (6:50)
13. Wolfgang Voigt – “Robert Schumann / Clara Wieck” (7:14)
14. Jörg Burger – “Sparwasser” (4:39)

=== Disc Two ===
1. Thomas Fehlmann – "Wasser im Fluss (Soulphiction Mix)" (7:38)
2. Michael Mayer – "Picanha Frenesi" (4:46)
3. Gui Boratto – "Plié (feat. Iggor Cavalera)" (3:57)
4. Robag Wruhme – "Rollmoff” (6:41)
5. Jonas Bering – "For Yves” (6:58)
6. WALLS – “Hang Four (Allez-allez Mix)” (5:12)
7. Popnoname – "Hello Gorgeous" (4:36)
8. Maxime Dangles – "Dysnoptik" (10:37)
9. Coma – "Bruxelles" (5:25)
10. Pachanga Boys – "Power” (8:26)
11. GusGus – "Hateful (Ada feat. Mayburg Mix" (5:48)
12. The Three Lions – “You'll Win Again” (5:21)
