= Kompakt 100 =

Compilation album by Various Artists
- Released: 25 June 2004
- Genre: Microhouse, minimal techno
- Length: 1:56:00
- Label: Kompakt

Professional ratings
Review scores
Source	Rating
Allmusic	3.5/5 stars
Pitchfork Media	(7.6/10)
Stylus	(A)

Kompakt 100 is a double-disc/4x12" compilation album released on 25 June 2004, to celebrate Kompakt's 100th release. On it the various familiar artists affiliated with the Cologne-based microhouse label (such as Superpitcher, Michael Mayer, Wolfgang Voigt, Jürgen Paape, etc.) were asked to remix their favourite Kompakt tracks from the past 100 releases.

== Track listing : Vinyl Edition ==
A1 Ulf Lohmann - "Because (Thomas/Mayer Mix)"

A2 Reinhard Voigt - "Zu Dicht Dran (DJ Koze Mix)"

B1 Freiland - "Frei/Hot Love (Justus Köhncke feat. Meloboy Mix)"

B2 Superpitcher - "Tomorrow (SCSI-9 Mix)"

C1 Schaeben & Voss - "The World Is Crazy (Jürgen Paape Mix)"

C2 Closer Musik - "Megamix (Reinhard Voigt Mix)"

D1 Justus Köhncke - "Weiche Zäune (The Modernist Mix)"

D2 Thomas Fehlmann - "Radeln (Sascha Funke Mix)"

E1 Superpitcher - "Tomorrow (Kaito Mix)"

E2 Dettinger - "Intershop (Jonas Bering Mix)"

F1 Schaeben & Voss - "Dicht Dran (Schaeben & Voss Mix)"

F2 M. Mayer - "17&4 (Joachim Spieth Mix)"

G1 Leandro Fresco - "Cero Uno (Matias Aguayo/Leandro Fresco Mix)"

G2 Dettinger - "Intershop (Ulf Lohmann Mix)"

G3 Closer Musik - "One Two Three No Gravity (Dettinger Mix)"

H1 Reinhard Voigt - "Robson Ponte (Wassermann Mix)"

H2 M. Mayer - "Pensum (Markus Guentner Mix)"

H3 Ulf Lohmann - "Because Before (The Orb Mix)"

== Track listing : CD Edition ==
101. Ulf Lohmann - "Because Before (The Orb Mix)" (4:52)

102. Ulf Lohmann - "Because (Thomas/Mayer Mix)" (6:05)

103. Reinhard Voigt - "Zu Dicht Dran (DJ Koze Mix)" (4:37)

104. Thomas Fehlmann - "Radeln (Sascha Funke Mix)" (6:03)

105. Justus Köhncke - "Weiche Zäune (The Modernist Mix)" (5:01)

106. M. Mayer - "17&4 (Joachim Spieth Mix)" (5:29)

107. Superpitcher - "Tomorrow (Kaito Mix)" (6:17)

108. Reinhard Voigt - "Robson Ponte (Wassermann Mix)" (4:08)

109. Kaito - "Respect To The Distance (Markus Guentner Mix)" (5:39)

110. Closer Musik - "One Two Three No Gravity (Dettinger Mix)" (5:05)

201. M. Mayer - "Pensum (Markus Guentner Mix)" (5:39)

202. Freiland - "Frei/Hot Love (Justus Köhncke feat. Meloboy Mix)" (4:13)

203. Lawrence - "Teaser (SCSI-9 Mix)" (6:33)

204. Schaeben & Voss - "The World Is Crazy (Jürgen Paape Mix)" (4:52)

205. Schaeben & Voss - "Dicht Dran (Schaeben & Voss Mix)" (5:41)

206. Dettinger - "Intershop (Jonas Bering Mix)" (5:46)

207. Closer Musik - "Megamix (Reinhard Voigt Mix)" (6:04)

208. Leandro Fresco - "Cero Uno (Matias Aguayo/Leandro Fresco Mix)" (6:42)

209. Superpitcher - "Tomorrow (SCSI-9 Mix)" (6:47)

210. Dettinger - "Intershop (Ulf Lohmann Mix)" (3:08)

211. Markus Guentner - "In Moll (Hannes Teichmann Mix)" (7:16)

CD edition includes three tracks (#109; #203; #211) not included on vinyl, otherwise the selection is the same.
