= Total 7 =

Kompakt: Total 7

Compilation album by Various Artists
- Released: 21 August 2006
- Genres: Microhouse, minimal techno
- Length: 2:24:51
- Label: Kompakt

Kompakt Total series chronology
Total 6 (2005)	Kompakt: Total 7 (2006)	Total 8 (2007)

Professional ratings
Review scores
Source	Rating
Allmusic	link
Pitchfork Media	7.9/10 link
PopMatters	link
Resident Advisor	link
Stylus Magazine	B link

Kompakt: Total 7 or Total 7 was released on 21 August 2006. The album is the seventh installment of the Cologne-based microhouse label's annual compilation of vinyl releases and exclusives from its biggest artists and most promising newcomers. All tracks on the vinyl edition are previously unreleased. The CD edition includes all tracks from the vinyl edition except one (which was put on an album released half a year later), and additionally some songs which were at the time of release already available on 12 inch format.

== Track listing : Vinyl Edition ==
A1 Jürgen Paape – "Take That" (4:40)

A2 Justus Köhncke – "Love And Dancing" (6:50)

B1 Gui Boratto – "Chromophobia" (7:13)

B2 Thomas Fehlmann – "Saft" (4:58)

C1 DJ Koze – "Getreide-Phunk" (6:29)

C2 Reinhard Voigt – "Tranceformation" (5:31)

D1 Kontrast – "Grey Skies To Blue" (7:07)

D2 SCSI-9 – "When She Said Goodbye" (6:43)

E1 Wassermann – "In Tyrannis 2006" (4:14)

E2 Thomas/Mayer – "Sweet Harmony" (7:24)

F1 The Modernist – "Pearly Spencer" (4:06)

F2 Superpitcher – "Tonite" (7:46)

All tracks except 'Gui Boratto – Chromophobia' is included on the CD edition.

== Track listing : CD Edition ==
101. Kontrast – "Grey Skies To Blue" (7:07)

102. Triola – "Leuchtturm (Wighnomy's Polarzipper Remix)" (5:34)

103. Gui Boratto – "Arquipélago" (6:08)

104. Justus Köhncke – "Love And Dancing" (6:50)

105. Thomas/Mayer – "Sweet Harmony" (7:24)

106. The Modernist – "Pearly Spencer" (4:06)

107. SCSI-9 – "When She Said Goodbye" (6:43)

108. Superpitcher – "Tonite" (7:46)

109. DJ Koze – "Getreide-Phunk" (6:29)

110. Wighnomy Bros. – "Wombat" (6:10)

111. Mikkel Metal – "Ulyt" (5:39)

112. The Rice Twins – "For Penny And Alexis" (4:38)

201. Gui Boratto – "Like You (SuperMayer Mix)" (7:38)

202. Wassermann – "In Tyrannis 2006" (4:14)

203. Robert Babicz – "Sonntag" (6:44)

204. Steadycam – "Knock-Kneed" (7:13)

205. Jürgen Paape – "Take That" (4:40)

206. HUG – "The Happy Monster" (6:09)

207. Axel Bartsch – "Redlight" (7:18)

208. Reinhard Voigt – "Tranceformation" (5:31)

209. Thomas Fehlmann – "Saft" (4:58)

210. The Field – "Over The Ice" (6:55)

211. Oxia – "Domino" (7:15)

212. Jonas Bering – "Melanie" (5:08)

One track 'Mikkel Metal – Ulyt' is exclusive to the CD. Twelve of the tracks on the CD are taken from previously released 12 inch vinyls originally released on Kompakt or sub-labels (catalogue number in parentheses): #102 (KOM118); #103 (K2/04); #110 (Speicher31); #112 (Speicher33); #201 (KOMPOP10); #203 (K2/03); #204 (K2/10); #206 (K2/05); #207 (KOM134); #210 (KOM137); #211 (Speicher34); #212 (KOM132).
