= Total 8 =

Kompakt: Total 8

Compilation album by Various Artists
- Released: 13 August 2007
- Genre: Microhouse, minimal techno
- Length: 2:30:39
- Label: Kompakt

Kompakt Total series chronology
Total 7 (2006)	Kompakt: Total 8 (2007)	Total 9 (2008)

Professional ratings
Review scores
Source	Rating
Pitchfork Media	6.9/10 link
Stylus Magazine	B− link

Kompakt: Total 8 or Total 8 was released on 13 August 2007. The album is the eighth installment of the Cologne-based microhouse label's annual compilation of vinyl releases and exclusives from its biggest artists and most promising newcomers. All tracks on the vinyl edition are previously unreleased. As with its predecessor (Total 7), the CD edition includes all tracks from the vinyl edition, and additionally fourteen tracks taken already available 12 inch singles.

== Track listing : Vinyl Edition ==
- A1 Schaeben & Voss feat. Schad Privat – Cold Wind
- A2 Justus Köhncke – Pickpockets
- B1 Reinhard Voigt – Follow The DJ
- B2 Thomas/Mayer – Über Wiesen
- C1 Burger/Voigt – Man Lebt Nur Zweimal
- C2 Jürgen Paape + Boy Schaufler – We Love
- D1 Superpitcher – Rainy Nights In Georgia
- D2 Mikkel Metal – Vastion
- E DJ Koze – Mariposa
- F Kaito – Soul Of Heart (Remix)

== Track listing : CD Edition ==
101. Burger/Voigt – "Man Lebt Nur Zweimal" (6:51)

102. Jürgen Paape & Boy Schaufler – "We Love" (5:40)

103. Superpitcher – "Rainy Nights In Georgia" (6:34)

104. Partial Arts – "Trauermusik" (7:56)

105. Rex The Dog – "Every Day (5:21)

106. Thomas/Mayer – "Über Wiesen" (7:04)

107. Jörg Burger – "Polyform 1" (5:56)

108. SuperMayer – "Two Of Us (Geiger mix)" (7:10)

109. Steadycam – "In The Moog For Love" (7:39)

110. Nightcats – "Inside" (6:49)

111. The Rice Twins – "Can I Say" (7:30)

201. Hervé Ak – "The Closer" (8:07)

202. DJ Koze – "Mariposa" (7:38)

203. Reinhard Voigt – "Follow The DJ" (5:11)

204. Jürgen Paape – "Nord" (5:59)

205. Echo Club – "Falter" (5:52)

206. April Brikha – "Berghain" (7:09)

207. Gui Boratto – "Mr Decay (Robert Babicz Universum Disco mix)" (7:47)

208. Justus Köhncke – "Pickpockets" (7:04)

209. Broke – "Coladancer" (8:06)

210. Schaeben & Voss – "Cold Wind (feat. Schad Privat)" (5:18)

211. Oxia – "Not Sure" (7:58)

Fourteen tracks on the CD are taken from previously released 12 inch singles originally released on Kompakt or sub-labels (catalogue number in parentheses): #104 (KOM149); #105 (KOM145); #107 (K2/23); #108 (KOM159); #109 (K2/25); #110 (K2/24); #111 (K2/17); #201 (K2/17); #204 (KOM156); #205 (KOM148); #206 (KOM151); #207 (KOM158); #209 (KOMPOP11); #211 (Speicher50).
