= Total 6 =

Kompakt: Total 6

Compilation album by Various Artists
- Released: 30 July 2005
- Genre: Microhouse, minimal techno
- Length: 2:27:47
- Label: Kompakt

Kompakt Total series chronology
Total 5 (2003)	Kompakt: Total 6 (2005)	Total 7 (2006)

Professional ratings
Review scores
Source	Rating
Allmusic	link
Pitchfork Media	8.7/10 link
PopMatters	link
Stylus Magazine	B+ link

Kompakt: Total 6 or Total 6 is a techno album released on 30 July 2005 on Kompakt.

== Background ==
The album is the sixth installment of the Cologne-based microhouse label's annual compilation of vinyl releases and exclusives from its biggest artists and most promising newcomers. All tracks on the vinyl edition are previously unreleased. Unlike previous Total installments all tracks from the vinyl edition are included on the CD, which this time is expanded to a double. The CD also contains three album-only tracks.

== Track listing : Vinyl Edition ==
A1 DJ Koze – Hicc Up (5:34)

A2 Justus Köhncke – Krieg (6:50)

B1 Jürgen Paape – Cream (5:55)

B2 Reinhard Voigt – Ready For Take Off (6:11)

C1 Aguayo/Rossknecht – Bouncin A Round (6:11)

C2 Jonas Bering – Glass (6:08)

D1 Superpitcher – Tell Me About It (6:56)

D2 Thomas / Mayer – Panic Room (6:19)

== Track listing : CD Edition ==
101 DJ Koze – "Hicc Up" (5:34)

102 Dorau / Köhncke – "Durch Die Nacht (Geiger Mix)" (6:39)

103 Justus Köhncke – "Krieg" (6:50)

104 Aguayo/Rossknecht – "Bouncin A Round" (6:11)

105 Baxendale – "I Built This City (Michael Mayer Mix)" (6:32)

106 Rex The Dog – "I Look Into Mid Air" (6:18)

107 Thomas Fehlmann – "Schöne Grüsse" (5:59)

108 Tocotronic – "Pure Vernunft Darf Niemals Siegen (Superpitcher/Wassermann Single Mix)" (3:56)

109 The MFA – "The Difference It Makes" (7:02)

110 Mikkel Metal – "Dorant" (6:12)

111 Jürgen Paape – "Cream" (5:56)

112 Reinhard Voigt – "Ready For Take Off" (6:09)

201 Dirk Leyers – "Wellen" (6:24)

202 Superpitcher – "Tell Me About It" (6:56)

203 Thomas/Mayer – "Panic Room" (6:23)

204 Mayer/Aguayo – "Slow" (6:18)

205 Kaito – "Hundred Million Light Years" (6:33)

206 SCSI-9 – "Mini" (6:24)

207 Jonas Bering – "Glass" (6:08)

208 Ferenc – "Tracatra" (5:27)

209 Heib – "Phönix" (5:43)

210 The Modernist – "The International Loner" (6:18)

211 Peter Grummich – "Frozen World" (5:46)

212 The Field – "Action" (6:09)

Thirteen tracks on the CD are taken from previously released 12 inch singles originally released on Kompakt or sub-labels (catalogue number in parentheses): #102 (KOMPOP4); #105 (KOMPOP8); #106 (KOM102); #108 (KOMPOP7); #109 (KOMPOP5); #110 (KOM104); #201 (KOM114); #204 (KOMPOP6); #205 (KOM135); #206 (KOM101); #209 (KOM111); #211 (KOM108); #212 (KOM116). Tracks #107, #208 and #210 are exclusive to the CD edition.
