= Total 2 =

Kompakt: Total 2

Compilation album by Various Artists
- Released: 25 July 2000
- Genre: Microhouse, minimal techno
- Length: 1:14:00
- Label: Kompakt

Kompakt Total series chronology
Total 1 (1999)	Kompakt: Total 2 (2000)	Total 3 (2001)

Professional ratings
Review scores
Source	Rating
Allmusic	4/5 stars

Kompakt: Total 2 or Total 2 was released on 25 July 2000. The album is the second installment of the Cologne-based microhouse label's annual compilation of vinyl releases and exclusives from its biggest artists and most promising newcomers. Except one (see below) all tracks on the vinyl edition were previously unreleased at the time of release. CD edition includes most of the tracks from the vinyl edition, and additionally some songs which were at the time of release already available on 12 inch from Kompakt.

== Track listings ==
=== Vinyl ===
- A1 Reinhard Voigt – "Zu Dicht Dran" (4:49)
- A2 Closer Musik – "Piraten" (7:49)
- B1 M. Mayer – "Amanda" (6:49)
- B2 The Modernist – "Channel 28" (6:52)
- C1 Dettinger – "Lemon" (6:36)
- C2 Jonas Bering – "Storch" (5:24)
- C3 Sascha Funke – "Appearance Are Deceptive" (4:53)
- D1 Superpitcher – "Shadows" (7:11)
- D2 Jimmi Moon – "Lovelane" (5:26)

Tracks A2 and C3 are exclusive to vinyl version. "Channel 28" (which is not on the CD) is taken from the album 'The Modernist – Explosion' released December 1999. Tracks B1, C1 and D1 are shortened on the CD.

=== CD ===
1. Reinhard Voigt – "Zu Dicht Dran" (4:49)
2. Schaeben Voss – "Fein Raus" (5:32)
3. Gebr. Teichmann – "Aus Der Ferne" (4:10)
4. Lawrence – "Gilbert" (6:16)
5. Dettinger – "Lemon" (5:55)
6. Jonas Bering – "Storch" (5:24)
7. M. Mayer – "Amanda" (5:31)
8. Closer Musik – "One Two Three (No Gravity)" (6:49)
9. Philippe Cam – "Karine" (6:16)
10. Sascha Funke – "Safety First" (5:28)
11. Dubstar – "Shining Through" (6:30)
12. Superpitcher – "Shadows" (5:54)
13. Jimmi Moon – "Lovelane" (5:26)

Seven of the tracks on the CD are taken from previously released 12" vinyls from Kompakt or sub-labels (catalogue number in parentheses): #2 (KOM17); #3 (KOM14); #4 (dialrec01); #8 (KOM16); #9 (TRAUM V04); #10 (KOM19); #11 (KOM11).
