= Total 4 =

Kompakt: Total 4

Compilation album by Various Artists
- Released: 23 July 2002
- Genre: Microhouse, minimal techno
- Length: 1:14:43
- Label: Kompakt

Kompakt Total series chronology
Total 3 (2001)	Kompakt: Total 4 (2002)	Total 5 (2003)

Professional ratings
Review scores
Source	Rating
Allmusic	link

Kompakt: Total 4 or Total 4 is the fourth installment, released on 23 July 2002, of the influential Cologne-based microhouse label Kompakt's annual compilation of vinyl releases and exclusives from its biggest artists and most promising newcomers. All tracks on the vinyl edition are previously unreleased. The CD edition includes most of the tracks from the vinyl edition, and additionally some songs which were at the time of release already available on 12-inch format. (Superpitcher covers a song from Brian Eno's 1974 solo debut Here Come the Warm Jets.)

== Track listing : Vinyl Edition ==
- A1 Autobianchi – "All Around (Everybody's Kissing)" (6:22)
- A2 Freiland – "Frei" (5:40)
- B1 Jürgen Paape – "Mit Dir" (4:37)
- B2 Schaeben & Voss – "I Was A Train" (3:35)
- B3 Thomas Fehlmann – "Autopilot" (3:53)
- C1 Reinhard Voigt – "Die Andere" (6:17)
- C2 Justus Köhncke – "Station 18" (5:59)
- D1 M. Mayer – "Falling Hands" (5:54)
- D2 Superpitcher – "Baby's On Fire" (6:58)

Tracks B2 and B3 are exclusive to vinyl version. Tracks A1 and D2 are shortened on the CD.

== Track listing : CD Edition ==
1. Thomas Fehlmann – "Making It Whistle" (6:10)
2. Jürgen Paape – "Mit Dir" (4:28)
3. Jonas Bering – "Marine" (4:42)
4. Superpitcher – "Baby's On Fire" (6:17)
5. M. Mayer – "Falling Hands" (5:54)
6. Justus Köhncke – "Station 18" (5:05)
7. Schaeben & Voss – "The World Is Crazy" (5:45)
8. Freiland – "Frei" (5:40)
9. Reinhard Voigt – "Die Andere" (6:10)
10. Voigt & Voigt – "Roxy" (6:45)
11. Autobianchi – "All Around (Everybody's Kissing)" (5:09)
12. Kaito – "Beautiful Day" (7:29)
13. Closer Musik – "Maria" (5:09)

Six of the tracks on the CD are taken from previously released 12 inch vinyls originally released on Kompakt (catalogue number in parentheses): #1 (KOM51); #3 (KOM48); #7 (KOM63); #10 (Speicher 3); #12 (KOM39); #13 (KOM52). Most of those tracks appear on this compilation in shortened versions.
