= Total 5 =

Kompakt: Total 5

Compilation album by Various Artists
- Released: 22 July 2003
- Genre: Microhouse, minimal techno
- Length: 1:09:00
- Label: Kompakt

Kompakt Total series chronology
Total 4 (2002)	Kompakt: Total 5 (2003)	Total 6 (2005)

Professional ratings
Review scores
Source	Rating
Allmusic	link
Pitchfork	7.7/10 link
Stylus Magazine	B+ link

Kompakt: Total 5 or Total 5 was released on 22 July 2003. The album is the fifth installment of the influential Cologne-based microhouse label's annual compilation of vinyl releases and exclusives from its biggest artists and most promising newcomers. All tracks on the vinyl edition are previously unreleased. Five songs appear on both the vinyl and CD formats.

== Track listing : Vinyl Edition ==
A1 Superpitcher – "Mushroom"

A2 T.Raumschmiere – "Total"

B1 Thomas Fehlmann – "Radeln"

B2 Joachim Spieth – "Nie Mehr Allein"

C1 Reinhard Voigt – "Liebe Deine Musik"

C2 M. Mayer/Reinhard Voigt – "Criticize"

D1 The Modernist – "Indigo"

D2 Heib – "Entdeckung Der Langsamkeit"

Tracks C2, D1 and D2 are exclusive to vinyl version.

== Track listing : CD Edition ==
1. SCSI-9 – "All She Wants Is" (7:06)
2. Superpitcher – "Mushroom" (6:32)
3. Phong Sui – "Wintermute (Burger/Voigt Mix)" (4:37)
4. Justus Köhncke – "Homogen" (6:17)
5. T.Raumschmiere – "Total" (5:36)
6. Reinhard Voigt – "Liebe Deine Musik" (4:47)
7. M. Mayer – "Speaker" (6:43)
8. Joachim Spieth – "Nie Mehr Allein" (6:42)
9. Thomas Fehlmann – "Radeln" (5:51)
10. Mikkel Metal – "Nepal" (7:11)
11. Jonas Bering – "Normandie 2" (7:36)

Six of the tracks on the CD are taken from previously released 12 inch vinyls originally released on Kompakt (catalogue number in parentheses): #1 (KOM81); #3 (KOMPOP2); #4 (KOM77); #7 (KOM70); #10 (KOM84); #11 (KOM79).
