= Today (Superpitcher album) =

Compilation album (Mix album) by Superpitcher
- Released: May 17, 2005
- Genre: Electronic; dance; experimental techno; techno
- Label: Kompakt

Superpitcher chronology
Here Comes Love (2004)	Today (2005)	Kilimanjaro (2009)

Professional ratings
Review scores
Source	Rating
AllMusic	4/5 stars
PopMatters	8/10 stars
Pitchfork	7.9/10
Stylus Magazine	A−

Today is a mix album made by German electronic music artist Superpitcher. It was released in 2005 on the Kompakt music label.

== Track listing ==
1. "Spark" (Lawrence) – 7:24
2. "Let's Help Me" (DJ Koze) – 4:59
3. "Lovefood (Matias Aguayo Mix)" (Michael Mayer) – 5:43
4. "Leuchtturm (Wighnomy's Polarzipper Remix)" (Triola) – 4:41
5. "21:31" (Oliver Hacke) – 7:01
6. "World Keeps Turning (Highfish & Zander Remix)" (Psychonauts) – 7:49
7. "Dinamo" (Nathan Fake) – 8:21
8. "Wurz + Blosse" (Wighnomy Brothers) – 5:04
9. "Happiness (Lawrence Mix)" (Superpitcher) – 6:46
10. "Old Song" (Max Mohr) – 6:42
11. "La Ritournelle" (Sébastien Tellier) – 7:42
