= So Weit Wie Noch Nie =

Single by Jürgen Paape
- B-side: "So Weit Wie Noch Nie (Playhouse Mix by ATA)"; "So Weit Wie Noch Nie (Dettinger/Mondschein Mix)"
- Released: 23 July 2002
- Genre: Microhouse, tech house, ambient house
- Length: 3:36 (radio mix); 6:05 (original mix); 5:39 (Total 3 edit)
- Label: Kompakt
- Songwriter(s): Jürgen Paape
- Producer(s): Jürgen Paape

Jürgen Paape singles chronology
"Glanz" (1999)	"So Weit Wie Noch Nie" (2002)	"Nord Nord-West" (2007)

"So Weit Wie Noch Nie" (German for As Far As Never Before) is a 2002 song by German electronic musician Jürgen Paape.

The single is considered his signature song and was included on the Kompakt label's compilation Total 3 in 2001 and later on Paape's own album Kompilation. It was placed in The Pitchfork 500, with Pitchfork calling it a "swaying, heady blend of weighty bass, spray-can hisses, and warm-blanket synths", as well as "some of the most thoroughly pleasurable techno of the [2000s] decade". The track samples the 1972 song "Vielleicht Schon Morgen" by Daliah Lavi, using also vocals by Sonya Lübke. It has been covered by Justus Köhncke for his album Was ist Musik (2002).

== Track listing ==
Side A

1. "So Weit Wie Noch Nie" (Original Mix) – 6:05
2. "So Weit Wie Noch Nie" (Radio Mix) – 3:36

Side B

1. "So Weit Wie Noch Nie" (Playhouse Mix by ATA) – 6:21
2. "So Weit Wie Noch Nie" (Dettinger/Mondschein Mix) – 4:55
