= Total 3 =

Kompakt: Total 3

Compilation album by Various Artists
- Released: 31 July 2001
- Genre: Microhouse, minimal techno
- Length: 1:13:31
- Label: Kompakt

Kompakt Total series chronology
Total 2 (2000)	Kompakt: Total 3 (2001)	Total 4 (2002)

Kompakt: Total 3 or Total 3 was released on 31 July 2001. The album is the third installment of the influential Cologne-based microhouse label's annual compilation of vinyl releases and exclusives from its biggest artists and most promising newcomers. Vinyl and CD editions are quite different since only six songs are included on both formats. All tracks on the vinyl format were previously unreleased when the compilation came out. "Departures" was since included on Closer Musik's album After Love, "So Weit Wie Noch Nie" was since released on 12 inch, both on Kompakt in 2002. It was this album that introduced the worldwide electronic music scene to the Cologne minimal sound which was to be dominated by Kompakt releases.

== Reception ==
Professional ratings
Review scores
Source	Rating
AllMusic	4.5/5 stars

The music online magazine Pitchfork placed Total 3 at number 175 on its list of top 200 albums of the 2000s.

== Track listing : Vinyl Edition ==
A1 Closer Musik – "Departures" (7:58)

A2 The Modernist – "Abi '81" (6:58)

B1 Jürgen Paape – "So Weit Wie Noch Nie" (5:39)

B2 Peter Grummich – "Schwimmen & Tauchen" (6:29)

B3 Superpitcher – "Stealing Beauty" (4:46)

C1 M. Mayer – "Hush Hush Baby" (6:44)

C2 Reinhard Voigt – "In Aller Freundschaft" (4:20)

C3 Sascha Funke – Kuschelrock (5:44)

D1 Schaeben & Voss – "Montoya" (5:47)

D2 Dettinger – "Tranquilizer" (5:49)

D3 Lawrence – "French Fries" (5:54)

Tracks B2, B3, C3, D1 and D3 are exclusive to vinyl version.

== Track listing : CD Edition ==
1. Sascha Funke – "Drei Auf Drei" (6:12)
2. Schaeben & Voss – "Ach Komm" (5:55)
3. M. Mayer – "Hush Hush Baby" (6:44)
4. The Modernist – "Abi '81" (6:58)
5. T.Raumschmiere – "Musick" (5:23)
6. Reinhard Voigt – "In Aller Freundschaft" (4:20)
7. Lawrence – "Teaser" (6:43)
8. Dettinger – "Tranquilizer" (5:49)
9. Superpitcher – "Tomorrow" (6:23)
10. Ulf Lohmann – "Because" (5:27)
11. Jürgen Paape – "So Weit Wie Noch Nie" (5:39)
12. Closer Musik – "Departures" (7:58)

Six of the tracks on the CD are taken from previously released 12 inch vinyl on Kompakt (catalogue number in parentheses): #1 (KOM29); #2(KOM32); #5 (KOM37); #7 (KOM41); #9 (KOM35); #10 (KOM31).
