= Toxygene =

1997 single by the Orb

Single by the Orb

from the album Orblivion
- B-side: "Alternate mixes"
- Released: 27 January 1997
- Genre: Ambient house
- Length: 5:19
- Label: Island
- Songwriter: Le Gonidec
- Producers: Alex Paterson, Andy Hughes, Thomas Fehlmann

The Orb singles chronology
"Oxbow Lakes" (1995)	"Toxygene" (1997)	"Asylum" (1997)

Audio sample
- file; help

"Toxygene" is a single by electronic music artist the Orb. It was released in 1997 as the first single from the album Orblivion. The song was originally commissioned as a remix of Jean-Michel Jarre's "Oxygène 8" from Oxygène 7–13. However, the Orb "obliterated it" and reassembled only a few fragments for their remix, much to the chagrin of Jarre, who reportedly "threw a fit and refused to release it". The Orb released the track themselves under the name "Toxygene", which further irritated Jarre, to whom Paterson retorted "The French are always five years behind us, anyway." In statements made after the release of "Toxygene", Jarre denied the reports: "It's not that I didn't like it, but I wanted the first wave of remixes to be linked to Oxygene's theme and textures." The release was accompanied by a music video directed by Ben Stokes.

"Toxygene" became the highest-charting single by the Orb, reaching number four on the UK Singles Chart on 8 February 1997. The band appeared on Top of the Pops to promote the song, with the two musicians each sitting cross-legged on a spinning platform surrounded by their gear. Outside the United Kingdom, "Toxygene" reached number 23 in Ireland and was an alternative hit in Canada, climbing to number four on the RPM Alternative 30 chart.

== Music video ==
The video for the song is inspired by the CIA's experimental mind control program: MK-ULTRA.

== Track listings ==
CD 1

1. "Toxygene (Edit)" – 3:37
2. "Toxygene (Way Out West Begbie Mix)" – 7:40
  Remix - Way Out West
3. "Delta MK II (Dal Vivo A Roma)" – 7:14
  Written by Giraudy, Hillage, Fehlmann
4. "Toxygene (Kris Needs Up For A Fortnight Mix)" – 7:17
  Remix - Henry Cullen, Kris Needs

CD 2

1. "Toxygene (Edit)" – 3:37
2. "Toxygene (Fila Brazillia Mix)" – 6:10
  Remix - Fila Brazillia
3. "Rose Tinted (Dal Vivo A Roma)" – 7:14
  Written by Lewis Keogh, Thomas Fehlmann
4. "Toxygene (Toxic Genes Mix)" – 7:59

12" single

- A1 "Toxygene (Toxic Genes Mix)" – 7:59
- A2 "Delta MK II (Dal Vivo A Roma)" – 6:15
- B "Toxygene (Kris Needs Up For A Fortnight Mix)" – 9:50

Remix - Henry Cullen, Kris Needs

== Charts ==
=== Weekly charts ===
Chart (1997–1998)	Peak position
Canada Rock/Alternative (RPM)	4
Ireland (IRMA)	23
Scottish Singles Sales (Official Charts)	5
UK Singles (Official Charts)	4
UK Dance (Official Charts)	9

=== Year-end charts ===
Chart (1997)	Position
UK Singles (OCC)	191

Chart (1998)	Position
Canada Rock/Alternative (RPM)	18
