= Once More (The Orb song) =

Single by The Orb

from the album Cydonia
- B-side: "Alternate mixes"
- Released: 2001
- Length: 4:17
- Label: Island
- Songwriter(s): Xuan Dang, Thomas Fehlmann, Andy Hughes, Akiko Omori, Alex Paterson
- Producer(s): Alex Paterson, Andy Hughes, Thomas Fehlmann

The Orb singles chronology
| "Asylum" (1997) | "Once More" (2001) | "Aftermath" (2004) |

"Once More" is a 2001 single by the Orb with vocals by Aki Omori. The B-sides include remixes by Mark Pritchard and Bedrock. The Bedrock remix was featured on Sasha & Digweed's Communicate album. It peaked at #38 on the UK Singles Chart.

"Aki Omori used to sing with a band called Freaky Realistic," said Alex Paterson, "and we hooked up a few years ago. For once, we actually sat down round the kitchen table and started writing the song – which is unheard of for me. We used 'Higher Than The Sun', which we did years ago with Primal Scream, as a blueprint and actually finished it in November '98."
