= Asylum (The Orb song) =

Single by The Orb

from the album Orblivion
- B-side: "Alternate mixes"
- Released: 1997
- Genre: Ambient house
- Length: 5:19
- Label: Island
- Songwriter(s): Thomas Fehlmann, Andy Hughes, Lewis Keogh, Alex Paterson
- Producer(s): Alex Paterson, Andy Hughes, Thomas Fehlmann

The Orb singles chronology
| "Toxygene" (1997) | "Asylum" (1997) | "Once More" (2001) |

"Asylum" is a single by the Orb from their 1997 album Orblivion. The single was released in two discs and featured remixes from artists including Thomas Fehlmann and Andrew Weatherall.
