= Immer =

Compilation album (Mix album) by Michael Mayer
- Released: 26 February 2002
- Genre: Electronic; dance; experimental techno; techno
- Length: 71:31
- Label: Kompakt
- Producer: Michael Mayer

Michael Mayer chronology
Neuhouse (1998)	Immer (2002)	Speicher CD1 (2003)

Immer (German for Always) is a mix album by German electronic music artist Michael Mayer. It was released on 26 February 2002 on the Kompakt record label based in Cologne.

== Reception ==
Professional ratings
Review scores
Source	Rating
AllMusic	5/5 stars
Muzik	4/5 stars

Online music magazine Pitchfork placed Immer at number 116 on its list of the top 200 albums of the 2000s.

In 2010, Resident Advisor placed Immer at number 1 on its list of top 50 mix CDs of the 2000s. In 2012, Rolling Stone ranked it at number 18 on its list of the 30 greatest EDM albums of all time. Writing for the AV Club, Andy Battaglia called Immer "an impeccably sequenced journey through techno's most brooding reaches."

== Track listing ==
No.	Title	Artist	Length
1.	"Tomorrow Goodbye" (Farben Remix)	Auch	3:36
2.	"Gamma Limit"	Audision	5:49
3.	"Rocket No. 3"	A Rocket in Dub	5:48
4.	"Toaster"	M. Rahn	5:30
5.	"Krokus" (Superpitcher Remix)	Carsten Jost	6:13
6.	"Deeper" (Ewan Pearson Ping Pong Beats)	Stargazer	3:55
7.	"Palersam the Cat"	Phon.o	4:01
8.	"Gratis"	Thomas Fehlmann	5:10
9.	"3.0"	Akufen	4:32
10.	"Perfect Lovers" (Unperfect Love Mix - Tobias Thomas & Superpitcher)	Phantom/Ghost	9:24
11.	"Flying Far"	Selway	5:47
12.	"Surface"	Paul Nazca	5:52
13.	"Adriano" (M. Mayer Remix)	Frank Martiniq	5:56
