= Speaking in Code =

Speaking In Code
- Directed by: Amy Grill
- Produced by: Amy Grill; David Day; Alexandra Lee; Jason Redmond
- Starring: David Day; Modeselektor; Philip Sherburne; Wighnomy Brothers; Monolake; Ellen Allien; Tobias Thomas
- Cinematography: Scott Sans
- Edited by: Jason Blanchard; Amy Grill
- Music by: Freude-Am-Tanzen; BPitch Control; Kompakt; Imbalance Computer Music; Tod's and Fred's Musikverlag; Random Noize Music; Mo's Ferry Productions
- Release date: 2009
- Running time: 89 minutes
- Country: United States
- Language: English

Speaking in Code is a character-based documentary directed by Amy Grill about people's obsessions with the techno electronic music lifestyle and the effects on their lives. It follows Modeselektor, the Wighnomy Brothers, Philip Sherburne, Monolake and David Day for three years as they attempt to grow in the techno community, as well as Grill's struggles to complete the film. It was shot in 11 cities and 5 countries.

== Plot ==
Director Amy Grill follows a series of techno community figures (including her husband, David Day). In doing so it forms six intertwined character studies, following their warehouse parties, international travel, risks, inventions, triumphs, and breakdowns.

The cast includes:

- Modeselektor, a producer duo, jettisoned from playing a tiny room in the US to playing to 20,000 people at the Sónar festival in Barcelona.
- Philip Sherburne, a journalist who leaves America to find a more complete techno lifestyle in Europe.
- The Wighnomy Brothers, whose rapid success leads them from Jena, Germany to their breaking point on camera.
- Tobias Thomas of Kompakt, who contemplates the near-end of his career.
- Robert Henke (Monolake), an inventor of the Ableton software that many electronic musicians use to create their music, who continues his steady yet quirky approach to a life in music.
- David Day, who struggles to popularize techno music in Boston. Day's ongoing failed projects and resulting frustrations put strain on his marriage to the director, as do Grill's "economy jet-setting" and the mounting costs and debts of producing an international documentary. They divorce by the end of the film.

== Background ==
Aspiring documentary filmmaker Amy Grill, music journalist Philip Sherburne and promoter/publicist David Day conceived the idea for Speaking in Code on a dancefloor in Miami, during the 2005 Winter Music Conference. They wanted to make a film not about the electronic dance music itself, but about the people and the obsessions behind the music.

In the beginning, the skeleton crew interviewed many potential characters. These DJs, producers, promoters and industry heads didn’t know that they were being camera tested as potential main character for a vérité film. They thought they were being interviewed for another survey documentary about electronic music.

Once the main subjects were established, the crew (usually just Grill, and Director of Photography, Scott Sans—who was still in college for most of the production) traveled on and off for three years following the ups and downs of them all.

In the years making the film, they all went through life changes and as the film's storyline unfolded, even the director became an unwilling part of the film. As they struggled to make the film a reality, the movie itself also took on a starring role.

In the meantime, the profiles of the selected artists grew larger by the month. BPitch Control’s Modeselektor was called on by Radiohead to open a tour of Japan and Björk asked them for a remix. The Wighnomy Brothers legendary DJ sets grew in status and popularity and their producing style were copied by leagues of house and techno producers. The software, Ableton Live, invented in part by Monolake, increased in popularity. Via Kompakt, Tobias Thomas released a series of acclaimed mix CDs, and Philip Sherburne, through his work for the tastemaking website Pitchfork Media, became the leading voice in electronic music journalism.

Throughout this process, a blog was kept by sQuare Productions which documented the making of the film and had thousands of fans visiting the site monthly. As mp3-blogs increased in popularity, so did the interest in the film and the people depicted within it.

By the time the movie was finally complete, the awareness of the project had reached around the entire world, with blogs as far away as Russia and Colombia reporting on the movie.

"I wanted the film to be as accessible as possible, without betraying or boring the true techno fans," Grill told XLR8R magazine. "Not everybody in techno is making $20,000 a gig; they are doing it for the love of music. It is a community that’s only possible because people make sacrifices to follow their dreams, to make incredible music."

== Release ==
Speaking in Code premiered at the Independent Film Festival Boston on April 23, 2009.

The film has been shown at film and music festivals in China, San Francisco, Athens, Seattle, New York City, Kraków, Amsterdam, Dallas, Toronto, Mannheim and elsewhere.

Speaking in Code debuted on DVD on March 29, 2010. The DVD release includes extras such as uncut footage from Modeselektor's at Sonar 2006, a tour of Kompakt with Michael Mayer and extended interviews with Ellen Allien of BPitch Control, Wolfgang Voigt of Kompakt and Wighnomy Brothers' first interview, and two years after Speaking In Code. In the printed insert, journalist Philip Sherburne contributes an essay.

Throughout the month of March, the filmmakers released special deleted scenes not found on the DVD to various websites. These included Monolake Tours Dubplates and Mastering and Bryan Kasenic Promotes Minimalism in New York City.

The film premiered in Germany on July 1, 2010 at the Kino Babylon Theatre. An after-party featured DJ sets from Tobias Thomas, Monkey Maffia and Philip Sherburne, all of whom appear in the film.

Speaking in Code received a wider DVD release by San Francisco's Microcinema International on July 27, 2010, and later digital distribution by EBS World Entertainment, who released the film through iTunes and later Amazon's Prime Video.

== Reception ==
Steve Mizek, editor of the electronic music website Little White Earbuds, said the film "successfully personalizes the realities of music obsession, from packed stadium triumphs to tribulations that require self-sacrifice in pursuit of satisfaction." Beatportal, the editorial arm of digital music distributor Beatport, asked the question if Speaking in Code was "Electronic music's most important documentary?" Saying it "comes as close to capturing the feeling of the electronic music lifestyle as anything I’ve ever watched before." Free quarterly European magazine Electronic Beats said Speaking in Code "is one of the first films that ventures to explain why so many people love this genre of music, in an intimate, almost philosophical manner." German radio and website Byte.fm called it "impressive" and "well worth seeing" French blog Chroniques Electroniques said it was "a very strange documentary" and "a surprising way to describe electronic music."

Electronic and hip-hop magazine URB called it "One of the most need-to-watch music docs in recent memory," and said the film is "worth watching more than once." "Speaking In Code is nothing short of an extraordinary documentation of fandom, freedom and everything in between."

Still others said it is "an unbelievable insight into electronic music culture", that "it reveals the human side of the thoroughly modern music" and that "We leave the theater hoping the best for everyone involved in Speaking In Code. It speaks well for its world.

Meanwhile, indie film blog Antagony & Ecstasy called it "magnificently touching" "humanistically resonant" and "terrifically interesting." On June 16, 2010 music website Foxy Digitalis said: "For anyone interested in alternative lifestyles, this is as insightful a journey as Don Letts' Punk Rock Movie, Penelope Spheeris' Decline of Western Civilization films, and Ivan Král's Blank Generation in relating the UK, LA, and NYC punk scenes. All open-minded music lovers and musicologists should add this film to their music library." Elsewhere, in a blog post, Venus Zine said the "compelling" movie was "artfully constructed and skillfully shot."

In 2012, at the DORF Film Festival in Croatia, "Speaking in Code" won "Best Movie in International Selection," beating out other films on Brian Eno and Iggy Pop. The jury stated: "In the code of this story we have depth of human relations, scene contributors, very skillful multilayered overview which avoids genre coordinates and gives to the movie new communicational dimension.”

== Music ==
Much of the music used in the film is from the artists who appear in the film and the labels they represent. Including but not limited to Jonas Bering, Modeselektor, The Rice Twins, Robag Wruhme, Wolfgang Voigt (aka Gas), Gui Boratto, Axel Willner (aka The Field), Aksel Shaufler (aka Superpitcher), Wighnomy Bros., Monolake, Oxia, Ellen Allien, Michael Mayer and others.

Because the film took three years to make, the choice of music drew criticism from some electronic music heads, saying "the sounds and artists they are focusing on are much less fresh than they were a couple of years ago." Though others, like online music magazine Pitchfork Media, called the artists profiled in the film "some of the genre's bleeding-edge names."

On March 1, 2010, electronic music website Beatport released two playlists for the film, acting as a digital soundtrack. The first was called "Anthems", while the second playlist related to the more ambient music used in the movie (called "Ambiance").

On March 4, 2010, Pitchfork Media ran a story in their Forkcast section which included a movie-related podcast from Boston DJ Baltimoroder. The Speaking in Code Podcast 01 included music from Philip Sherburne, Tobias Thomas and others. The site called the podcast "pretty amazing."

The second Speaking in Code podcast features a 186-minute DJ set from Tobias Thomas, from the after-party for a screening in partnership with the Together festival.

Speaking in Code Podcast 03 was uploaded to music website SoundCloud on May 20, 2010. It was created and mixed by Douglas Greed of the Freude-Am-Tanzen label in Jena, Germany. Freude-Am-Tanzen is one of the music collectives featured in the film. Greed himself gives a tour of the Muna club in the special features of the DVD.
