= Moonbuilding 2703 AD =

Studio album by the Orb
- Released: 22 June 2015
- Genres: Ambient house, dub, IDM
- Length: 51:49 (CD, Vinyl & Download Versions); 64:55 (Download Deluxe Version); 75:34 (Limited Deluxe Vinyl LP Version)
- Label: Kompakt
- Producer: The Orb

The Orb chronology
More Tales from the Orbservatory (2013)	Moonbuilding 2703 AD (2015)	COW / Chill Out, World! (2016)

Moonbuilding 2703 AD is the thirteenth studio album from ambient house duo the Orb. It is the first album they released through the Kompakt label since the 2005 release of Okie Dokie It's The Orb on Kompakt. It was released on 22 June 2015.

== Reception ==
Professional ratings
Aggregate scores
Source	Rating
AnyDecentMusic?	7.5/10
Metacritic	77/100
Review scores
Source	Rating
AllMusic	4/5 stars
Drowned in Sound	8/10
The Guardian	4/5 stars
NME	7/10
Pitchfork	6.7/10
PopMatters	8/10
Record Collector	4/5 stars
Release Magazine	8/10
Slant Magazine	3.5/5 stars
Uncut	3.5/5 stars

Moonbuilding 2703 AD has received positive reviews from music critics, with some saying it is the band's best album in over 20 years. At Metacritic, which assigns a normalized rating out of 100 to reviews from mainstream critics, the album received an average score of 77, based on 16 reviews, which indicates "Generally favorable reviews".

In his 4 star review for Record Collector, Phil Smith says that the album has "Walloping techno rhythms simply step in and out of pretty melodies, pleasing textures and grainy sample loops" and concluding the review by saying that "While the album is relatively low-key and meandering, that's arguably what we want from The Orb – and hence it might just be the one you've been waiting on from them for 20 years." Barney Harsent of The Arts Deck said that Moonbuilding 2703 AD is "without doubt, the most coherent offering from the Orb (currently composed of Alex Paterson and Thomas Fehlmann) since Adventures Beyond the Ultraworld" and also said that their "latest offering is similarly hurtling through space once more, and reminding us of their conceptual debut that slapped us around our collective face back in 1991. It feels like a similar event."

Gavin Miller of Drowned in Sound in his 8/10 review said that Moonbuilding 2703 AD is "an album heaving with ideas, but just coherent enough to stick together as one piece of work" and went on to say that the album is a "great little re-introduction to all things Orb." Benjamin Aspray of Slant Magazine starts off his 3.5 stars out of 5 review by saying "With Moonbuilding 2703 AD, the Orb makes a full circle back to the long-form conceptual terrain of 1991's game-changing Adventures Beyond the Ultraworld and its follow-up, U.F.Orb. The album sustains a progressive composition over four distinct parts, forgoing instant gratification for slow builds and subtle variations, culminating in the Orb's most cohesive work in ages." He ends the review for the album saying "It's never quite a tour de force, but as a union of the Orb's heady roots with their spiritual ascendants' minimalist ethos, the album is a consistently satisfying groove machine, and a worthy entry to the upper ranks of the Orb canon."

== Track listing ==
Vinyl, CD & Download Versions
No.	Title	Length
1.	"God's Mirrorball"	14:44
2.	"Moon Scapes – 2703 BC"	14:40
3.	"Lunar Caves"	9:16
4.	"Moonbuilding – 2703 AD"	13:04
Total length:		51:49

Japanese Version (Bonus Tracks)
No.	Title	Length
5.	"Moon Quake 1"	3:22
6.	"Moon Quake 3"	2:14
Total length:		57:25

Download Deluxe Version (Bonus Tracks)
No.	Title	Length
5.	"Moon Quake (Slice of Silver)"	8:44
6.	"Moon Quake 6"	4:22
Total length:		64:55

Limited Deluxe Vinyl LP Version (Bonus Tracks)
No.	Title	Length
5.	"Dilla's Moon Quake" (The Orb's Tribute to J Dilla)	10:39
6.	"Moon Quake (Slice of Silver)"	8:44
7.	"Moon Quake 6"	4:22
Total length:		75:34

Notes

- "Dilla's Moon Quake" is not included in the iTunes track listing.

== Personnel ==
The Orb

- Alex Paterson – production
- Thomas Fehlmann – production

== Charts ==
Chart (2015)	Peak position
UK Albums Chart	90
UK Dance Albums Chart	19
UK Independent Albums Chart	9
UK Record Store Albums Chart	10
UK Vinyl Albums Chart	22
