= Total 1 =

Kompakt: Total 1

Compilation album by Various Artists
- Released: 30 July 1999
- Genre: Microhouse, minimal techno
- Length: 1:12:26
- Label: Kompakt

Kompakt Total series chronology
Kompakt: Total 1 (1999)	Total 2 (2000)

Professional ratings
Review scores
Source	Rating
Allmusic	link

Kompakt: Total 1 or Total 1 was released on 30 July 1999. The album is the first installment of the influential Cologne-based microhouse label's annual compilation of vinyl releases and exclusives from its biggest artists and most promising newcomers. Vinyl and CD editions are quite different since only six songs are included on both formats. All tracks on the vinyl edition are previously unreleased.

== Track listing : Vinyl Edition ==
A1 Dettinger – "Infarkt" (5:09)

A2 Reinhard Voigt – "Tod Eines Hippiemädchens" (4:29)

A3 T.Raumschmiere – "Ost-Strom" (5:30)

B1 Salz – "Salz 2.1" (5:24)

B2 Andreas Oster – "Surf´s Up" (6:11)

C1 Jürgen Paape – "How Great Thou Art" (5:31)

C2 Tobin – "Reis 1" (4:15)

C3 Mathias Schaffhäuser – "Some Kind Of" (6:01)

D1 Super-8 – "Episode 1" (6:24)

D2 Thomas/Mayer – "Total Confusion" (6:43)

Tracks B2, C2, D1 and D2 are exclusive to vinyl version.

== Track listing : CD Edition ==
1. Jürgen Paape – "How Great Thou Art" (5:31)
2. Salz – "Salz 2.1" (5:24)
3. Benjamin Wild – "Kronberg" (6:20)
4. Schaeben & Voss – "Dicht Dran" (4:26)
5. M. Mayer – "17 & 4" (6:38)
6. T.Raumschmiere – "Ost-Strom" (5:30)
7. Dettinger – "Infarkt" (5:09)
8. Reinhard Voigt – "Tod Eines Hippiemädchens" (4:29)
9. Joachim Spieth – "Abi '99" (4:18)
10. Jürgen Paape – "Triumph" (6:04)
11. Mathias Schaffhäuser – "Some Kind Of" (6:01)
12. M. Mayer – "Heaven" (6:17)
13. Dettinger – "Blond" (6:19)

Seven of the tracks on the CD are taken from previously released 12 inch vinyls originally released on Kompakt or sub-labels (catalogue number in parentheses): #3 (KOM8); #4 (KOM7); #5 (KOM4); #9 (KOM5); #10 (KOM1); #12 (nta015); #13 (KOM2).
