= Orblivion =

Studio album by the Orb
- Released: 24 February 1997
- Recorded: May 1996
- Genres: Electronica; IDM; ambient house; dub
- Length: 72:00
- Label: Island
- Producers: Alex Paterson; Thomas Fehlmann

The Orb chronology
Orbus Terrarum (1995)	Orblivion (1997)	Cydonia (2001)

Professional ratings
Review scores
Source	Rating
AllMusic	4.5/5 stars
Chicago Tribune	3.5/4 stars
DownBeat	4/5 stars
The Guardian	3/5 stars
Muzik	8/10
NME	7/10
Pitchfork	9.3/10
Rolling Stone	3/5 stars
Select	4/5
Spin	8/10

Orblivion is the fourth studio album by English electronic music group the Orb, released on 24 February 1997 by Island Records. This album marked when the group, reunited with Andy Hughes and Steve Hillage, returned to their spacey sounds typical of U.F.Orb (1992). Although Orblivion was recorded in May 1996, it was not released until almost a year later, due to Island Records' desire to promote it as a follow-up to U2's Pop.

Orblivion sold well in Europe and the United States, reaching number nineteen on the UK Albums Chart and number 174 on the US Billboard 200, while its lead single "Toxygene" became the highest-charting single by the Orb, reaching number four in the UK. However, the album received an indifferent reception from the British music press, but similarly to the case of Orbus Terrarum, it received better praise from American critics, with Rolling Stone calling it a "scintillating contrast of chaos and euphony".

To support the album, the Orb embarked on the Organic Tour with Orbital, Meat Beat Manifesto, Underworld, Zion Train, and The Chemical Brothers. The Village Voice described the Orb as "on its way down" and the stresses of touring sat heavily on member Alex Paterson, but the Orb decided not to "pack it in" and instead continued touring and producing.

== Composition ==
Orblivion features many samples, including "72", which contains a clip from Hair proclaiming "the youth of America on LSD!". The track "S.A.L.T." is based on samples taken from Mike Leigh's film Naked, which features rantings from the main character's apocalyptic preaching.

== Track listing ==
No.	Title	Length
1.	"Delta MKII"	7:00
2.	"Ubiquity"	6:13
3.	"Asylum"	5:19
4.	"Bedouin"	4:31
5.	"Molten Love"	6:39
6.	"Pi"	1:05
7.	"S.A.L.T."	7:54
8.	"Toxygene"	5:19
9.	"Log of Deadwood"	1:13
10.	"Secrets"	5:32
11.	"Passing of Time"	9:27
12.	"72" (ends at 0:06; starting at 5:06 is a hidden track which runs for 6:37)	11:43

2008 expanded edition bonus disc
No.	Title	Length
1.	"Delta MK II" (Love Bites Mix)	14:20
2.	"Bedouin" (The Sheik's Film Mix)	10:04
3.	"Log of Deadwood" (Implanting Machines Mix)	1:24
4.	"Secrets" (I Love a Woman in Uniform Mix)	8:25
5.	"Passing of Time" (Ambient Mix)	9:03
6.	"Molten Love" (Orbits of Venus Mix)	12:24
7.	"S.A.L.T." (Snow Mix)	9:19
8.	"Toxygene" (Kris Needs Up for a Fortnight Mix)	7:14
9.	"Asylum" (Soul Catcher Mix)	7:29
