= Moonquake (disambiguation) =

A moonquake is the lunar equivalent of an earthquake.

Moonquake may also refer to:

- "Moon Quake", a bonus track on some versions of the 2015 album Moonbuilding 2703 AD by The Orb
- "Moonquake", a 1959 episode of TV series Men into Space

== See also ==
- MoonQuake Lake, a fictional film within the 2014 film Annie, and a song
- Mooncake, a Chinese baked item
