= Sect (disambiguation) =

A sect is a subgroup of a religious, political or philosophical belief system. It may also refer to:

- Astrology of sect, an ancient astrological concept
- Subepithelial connective tissue graft, also referred as SECT graft

== In entertainment ==
- Sect (World of Darkness), a large organization of vampires set in World of Darkness
- Sect (band), a Brazilian Eurodance band
- SECT, an American-Canadian hardcore punk band

== See also ==
- The Sect (disambiguation)
