= Chromophobia (disambiguation) =

Chromophobia is the fear or aversion of colors.

Chromophobia may also refer to:

- Chromophobe cell, a histological structure that does not stain readily
- Chromophobia (film), a 2005 film directed by Martha Fiennes
- Chromophobia (album), an album by Gui Boratto
- Chromophobia , a book published in 2000 by David Batchelor
- Chromophobia, a state in which cells do not absorb hematoxylin as a result of chromatolysis
- Chromophobia, a 1966 animated short by Raoul Servais
