= Tots =

Tots or TOTS may refer to:

- Tots TV, British children's television programme on ITV
- T.O.T.S. (Tiny Ones Transport Service), a 2019 animated television series on Disney Junior
- Top of the Shops (TOTS), Croatian music sales charts
- Izvestiya TOTs, published by the All-Tatar Public Center
- 'Tots', short for Tater tots, a brand of hash browns produced by Ore-Ida
- Tots, a style of hash brown reminiscent of Ore-Ida Tater Tots
- Terre Haute Tots, Terre Haute, Indiana, USA; the Tots, a baseball team
- Tots Carlos (born 1988), Filipino volleyball player
- Tots Tolentino (born 1959), Filipino musician

== See also ==
- Minot Hot Tots, Minot, North Dakota, USA; the Hot Tots, a baseball team
- Tot (disambiguation), for the singular of TOTs
