= Vuja De =

Vuja De may mean:

- Vuja de, something familiar viewed with a fresh view
- The Dream (The Orb album), music single
- "Vuja De", lead single from U-Know Yunho's 2023 album Reality Show
