= The Dream (The Orb album) =

Studio album by the Orb
- Released: 27 August 2007
- Genres: Electronic; trip hop; dub; IDM
- Length: 72:56
- Labels: Liquid Sound Design; Traffic Inc.; Six Degrees
- Producer: The Orb

The Orb chronology
Okie Dokie It's The Orb on Kompakt (2005)	The Dream (2007)	Baghdad Batteries (Orbsessions Volume III) (2009)

Singles from The Dream
- 1. "Vuja De" Released: 2007

Professional ratings
Aggregate scores
Source	Rating
Metacritic	62/100
Review scores
Source	Rating
AllMusic	4/5 stars
The A.V. Club	C
MusicOMH	3/5 stars
NME	6/10
Pitchfork	3.6/10
PopMatters	7/10
Q	3/5 stars
Record Collector	5/5 stars
Uncut	3/5 stars
URB	3.5/5 stars

The Dream is the eighth studio album by the English electronic music group the Orb. It was released on 27 August 2007 by Liquid Sound Design, Traffic Inc., and Six Degrees Records and for the first time released on vinyl in 2023. The album represents something of a return to their earlier sound and shares much more in common with their 2004 album Bicycles and Tricycles as opposed to the minimal 2005 release Okie Dokie It's the Orb on Kompakt. Orb member Thomas Fehlmann was absent on the album, and Paterson was instead reunited with Martin Glover, and joined by Tim Bran of Dreadzone.

== Track listing ==
The Dream track listing
No.	Title	Writer(s)	Length
1.	"The Dream (The Future Academy of Noise, Rhythm and Gardening Mix)" (Guitar by Matt Chandler, vocals by Helen Boulding)	Alex Paterson, Boulding, Martin Glover, Tim Bran	6:26
2.	"Vuja De" (Single; mixed by Andy Hughes, additional programming by Adam Pickard, vocals by Aki Omori)	Paterson, Glover, Bran	5:45
3.	"Something Supernatural"	Paterson, Glover, Bran	0:36
4.	"A Beautiful Day" (Vocals by Juliet Roberts)	Paterson, Roberts, Glover, Bran	6:48
5.	"DDD (Dirty Disco Dub)" (Mixed by Hughes, additional programming by Pickard, vocals by Andy Caine, The Corpral)	Paterson, Caine, Glover, Bran	5:03
6.	"The Truth Is..." (Guitar by Steve Hillage, vocals by Roberts)	Paterson, Roberts, Glover, Bran	6:43
7.	"Phantom of Ukraine"	Paterson, Glover, Bran	0:30
8.	"Mother Nature" (Guitar by Hillage, mixed by Greg Hunter, vocals by The Corpral, Roberts)	Paterson, Roberts, Glover, Bran	6:30
9.	"Lost & Found" (Vocals by The Corpral)	Paterson, Glover, Bran	6:19
10.	"The Forest of Lyonesse"	Paterson, Glover, Bran	1:09
11.	"Katskills" (Mixed by Hunter, performed by Dr. D, programmed by Pickard)	Paterson, Glover, Bran	5:55
12.	"High Noon" (Guitar by Hillage)	Paterson, Glover, Hillage, Bran	6:03
13.	"Sleeping Tiger & The Gods Unknown"	Paterson, Glover, Bran	1:09
14.	"Codes" (Guitar by Hillage, vocals by Carol Luna, spoken word by Cozy)	Paterson, Luna, Glover, Hillage, Bran	8:13
15.	"Orbisonia" (Programmed by David Nock)	Paterson, Glover, Bran	5:47
16.	"Let The Music Set You Free" (Japanese edition only)	Paterson, Glover, Bran	7:01
17.	"Free Bird" (iTunes Bonus Track on US edition only)	Allen Collins, Ronnie Van Zant	9:56

== Charts ==
Chart performance for The Dream
Chart (2023)	Peak position
Scottish Albums (Official Charts)	40
UK Independent Albums (Official Charts)	23
