= Okie Dokie It's The Orb on Kompakt =

Okie Dokie It's the Orb on Kompakt

Studio album by the Orb
- Released: 8 November 2005
- Genres: Electronic; IDM; minimal techno; trip hop
- Length: 56:15
- Label: Kompakt
- Producers: Alex Paterson; Thomas Fehlmann

The Orb chronology
| Bicycles & Tricycles (2004) | Okie Dokie It's the Orb on Kompakt (2005) | The Dream (2007) |

Okie Dokie It's the Orb on Kompakt is the seventh studio album by English electronic music group the Orb, released on 8 November 2005 by Kompakt. It features new material in addition to new versions of their previous Kompakt releases.

== Critical reception ==
Professional ratings
Review scores
| Source | Rating |
|---|---|
| AllMusic | 4/5 stars |
| Pitchfork | 7.3/10 |

The Orb's music on Kompakt featured Thomas Fehlmann as the primary creative figure, "inhibiting Alex Paterson's whimsical impulses". Because of this, the album was considerably more focused, even, and less "goofy" than Cydonia and Bicycles & Tricycles. Fehlmann's trademark hypnotic loops and delays made him the center of Okie Dokie production and, according to Pitchfork, made it "difficult to say where [Paterson] is in the picture". Besides Paterson and Fehlmann, Okie Dokie featured Ulf Lohmann as a co-writer on a track as well as Schneider TM performing vocals for another. The Orb's releases with Kompakt gained the Orb back much of their musical credibility with the press and showed that the Orb could "age gracefully".

== Track listing ==
1. "Komplikation" – 3:55
2. "Lunik TM" (featuring Schneider TM) – 5:50
3. "Ripples" – 5:51
4. "Captain Korma" – 4:13
5. "Kan Kan" – 4:43
6. "Rolo" – 2:36
7. "Beatitude" – 2:43
8. "Cool Harbour" – 5:11
9. "Traumvogel" – 6:24
10. "Because/Before (Sibirische Musik)" (featuring Ulf Lohmann) – 4:40
11. "Tin Kan" – 4:31
12. "Kompagna (Zandic Mix)" – 3:53
13. "Falkenbrück" – 3:29
14. "Snowbow" – 2:16
15. "Edelgrun" – 5:52

"Traumvogel" (2005)
Clip from "Traumvogel", featured on the Orb's Komfort EP and Okie Dokie It's the Orb on Kompakt.
