= Turn It Down =

Turn It Down may refer to:

- "Turn It Down", song by Kaskade from Fire & Ice
- "Turn It Down", song by Sweet from Desolation Boulevard
- "Turn It Down", song by the Orb from Cydonia
