= Baghdad Batteries (Orbsessions Volume III) =

Studio album by the Orb
- Released: 7 September 2009
- Genres: Electronica, IDM, chill-out, trip hop
- Length: 53:32
- Label: Malicious Damage

The Orb chronology
The Dream (2007)	Baghdad Batteries (Orbsessions Volume III) (2009)	Metallic Spheres (2010)

Professional ratings
Aggregate scores
Source	Rating
AnyDecentMusic?	6.1/10
Review scores
Source	Rating
Clash	7/10
The Guardian	3/5 stars
Pitchfork	5.4/10
Record Collector	3/5 stars
Release Magazine	6/10

Baghdad Batteries (Orbsessions Volume III) is the ninth studio album by ambient techno group the Orb, released in September 2009. The album sees Alex Paterson again working with Thomas Fehlmann, and it serves as a continuation of the style the two explored earlier on Okie Dokie It's the Orb on Kompakt.

== Track listing ==
No.	Title	Length
1.	"Styrofoam Meltdown"	3:45
2.	"Chocolate Fingers"	5:13
3.	"Baghdad Batteries"	5:09
4.	"Raven's Reprise"	4:12
5.	"Dolly Unit"	5:01
6.	"Super Soakers"	8:42
7.	"Suburban Smog"	6:51
8.	"Orban Tumbleweed"	3:32
9.	"Pebbles"	1:08
10.	"Woodlarking"	3:47
11.	"OOPA"	6:12
12.	"Dolly Unit (Majestic Flowing Remix)" (Japan only, remix by Thomas Fehlmann)	8:48
Total length:		53:32
