= Tot =

Tot, ToT or TOT may refer to:

== Economics ==
- Total (Tot.), the summation of multiple values
- Transient occupancy tax, charged in the US
- Terms of trade, the relative price of imports in terms of exports

== Science ==
- Tetrahedral-Octahedral-Tetrahedral, mineralogy, TOT or T-O-T. eg Chlorite group: Properties

== Organizations ==
- TOT (Thailand), a telecommunications company
  - TOT S.C., defunct Thai football club sponsored by the telecoms company
- Total S.A., an oil company with NYSE ticker symbol TOT
- Tottenham Hotspur F.C., an English football club with the scoreboard abbreviation TOT

== People ==
- Tot Farnall (1874–1927), English footballer, played for various clubs
- Tot Walsh (1900–1950), English footballer, mostly played for Bristol City
- Tót, Hungarian surname and ethnonym
- Marijo Tot – Croatian football manager (born 1972)
- Rodrigo Tot (born c.1958), Guatemalan farmer
- Harrison Bader (born 1994), nickname of American Major League Baseball player

== Music ==
- Tree of Tongues, an album by American mathcore quartet Exotic Animal Petting Zoo

== Other uses ==
- Transfer of technology, the process of disseminating technology
- Tot, a single tater tot, short for Tater tots, a brand of hash browns produced by Ore-Ida
- Toddler or young child
- Rum ration, given daily to sailors on Royal Navy ships
- Theatre of Tragedy, a Norwegian band
- Time on Target, a military technique
- Tip of the tongue, a memory processing phenomenon
- Totnes railway station, Devon, England; National Rail station code
- Tottenham railway station, Melbourne
- Trail of Tears
- Trans-obturator vaginal tape, procedure for urinary incontinence
- Treaty of Tordesillas (ToT), signed 1494
- Time in Tonga, a time zone with abbreviation TOT
- Tears of Themis, a 2020 adventure video game by MiHoYo

== See also ==
- Total (disambiguation)
- Tots (disambiguation)
