= Rainbow Arabia =

Rainbow Arabia is an electronic duo founded in Echo Park, Los Angeles, in 2008. The outfit consists of Future Pigeon keyboardist Danny Preston and his wife, Tiffany Preston.

== Career ==
The married couple perform a brand of electronic music that combines elements of Arabic, North African, and Asian musical styles fused with American avant-garde dance pop. They released two EPs on Manimal Vinyl records since forming in early 2008: The Basta (2008) and Kabukimono (2009). They have also released the full-length album Boys and Diamonds (2011) on the Kompakt label. Rainbow Arabia have toured the US with bands like Gang Gang Dance and Julian Casablancas and played shows in Europe with Wavves and Mogwai. Their Kabukimono EP found critical acclaim on both sides of the Atlantic. In 2011, Rainbow Arabia shifted their focus into more cosmic territory aligning with the venerable Kompakt Records who released their first full-length album Boys And Diamonds. In 2013, Rainbow Arabia returned with their 2nd LP, FM Sushi, further expanding their cosmic sound by adding multi-instrumentalist Dylan Ryan (Icy Demons, Sand) into the mix. In FM Sushi, they take a decidedly different direction for the group, stripping away much of the tropical rhythms in favor of exploring a more pulsing, immersive sound that combines krautrock's rolling synthscapes with their signature mercurial pop. The newest album, L.A. Heartbreak, is out Nov 11, 2016 on the Time No Place Label. This album is dreamy, melodic pop that takes cues from Tangerine Dream, OMD, Moroder and Jan Hammer - with leaner, brighter production and hooks evoking 80's radio pop that skew more towards Madonna and Cyndi Lauper rather than darker post-punk influences referenced on Rainbow Arabia's earlier albums.

== Musical influences ==
Rainbow Arabia has drawn inspiration from Middle Eastern artists on the Sublime Frequencies label, including Omar Souleyman. The band also cite European influences such as Joy Division, OMD and Kraftwerk.

== Discography ==
=== Studio albums ===
- Boys and Diamonds (Kompakt, 2011)
- FM Sushi (Time No Place/Kompakt, 2013)
- L.A. Heartbreak (Kompakt, 2016)

=== EPs ===
- The Basta EP (Manimal Vinyl 2008)
- Kabukimono EP (Manimal Vinyl 2009)
