= Walls (band) =

Walls are an electronic band from the UK. They are a two-piece composed of Alessio Natalizia and Sam Willis.

Italian Natalizia moved to London in 2008 and started his project Banjo or Freakout. Willis originated in Manchester and moved to London in 1996. They have released two albums on Kompakt Records.

Their first album (self titled) picked up Mojo 's 'Electronic Album of the Year'. They were also featured in NME 's end-of-year list.

Walls won critical acclaim with their second album Coracle, released in August 2011. Their first single from it, "Sunporch", was released on 29 August 2011.

Walls debut was also a favourite amongst their contemporaries – Jamie xx, Caribou, James Holden and Battles. The Field and Pantha Du Prince are also known to have collaborated with the artist.

Walls are signed to Kompakt record label and have featured on a compilation album named Total 11.
