= Take My Breath Away (album) =

Studio album by Gui Boratto
- Released: February 23, 2009
- Genre: House, minimal techno
- Label: Kompakt

Gui Boratto chronology
Chromophobia (2007)	Take My Breath Away (2009)	III (2011)

Professional ratings
Review scores
Source	Rating
PopMatters	8/10 stars

Take My Breath Away is the second studio album by Brazilian DJ and producer Gui Boratto. It was released on German label Kompakt, with an internet release on February 23, 2009, a US release on March 3, and a UK release on March 9.

== Track listing ==
1. Take My Breath Away - 06:45
2. Atomic Soda - 08:48
3. Colors - 04:00
4. Opus 17 - 06:59
5. No Turning Back - 07:45
6. Azurra - 04:59
7. Les Enfants - 04:05
8. Besides - 04:18
9. Ballroom - 09:07
10. Eggplant - 06:50
11. Godet - 04:13

== Charts ==
- 91 - Belgium (Flanders) Albums Chart
- 131 - France Albums Chart
