= Totally =

Totally may refer to:

- Totally (album), album by German band Bad Boys Blue
- Totally (company), publishing company
- Totally Games, video game developer

== See also ==
- La Totale! (film), 1991 French spy comedy film
- TOTALe, a software suite related to Rosetta Stone (software)
- Total (disambiguation)
