= III (Gui Boratto album) =

Gui Boratto

Studio album by Gui Boratto
- Released: September 2011
- Genre: House, progressive house, techno, minimal techno
- Label: Kompakt

Gui Boratto chronology
Take My Breath Away (2009)	Gui Boratto (2011)	The K2 Chapter (2013)

Professional ratings
Review scores
Source	Rating
Clash	8/10
Pitchfork	6.4/10
PopMatters	5/10 stars
Sputnikmusic	4/5

III is the third studio album by Brazilian DJ and producer Gui Boratto, released on German label Kompakt Records.

== Track listing ==
1. Galuchat - 06:52
2. Stems From Hell - 08:11
3. Striker - 06:19
4. The Drill - 05:08
5. Flying Practice - 04:44
6. Trap - 03:43
7. Soledad - 05:05
8. Destination Education - 04:37
9. Talking Truss - 08:02
10. The Third - 05:02
11. This Is Not the End - 05:36
