= The Sect =

The Sect may refer to:

- The Devil's Daughter, a 1991 Italian horror film also known as The Sect
- The Sect, a fictional group in Kerberos Saga media

== See also ==
- Sect (disambiguation)
