= Boys and Diamonds =

Studio album by Rainbow Arabia
- Released: February 28, 2011 (Europe), March 1, 2011 (North America)
- Genre: Electronic music, electropop
- Length: 41:37
- Label: Kompakt
- Producer: Danny Preston

Rainbow Arabia chronology
Boys and Diamonds (2011)	FM Sushi (2013)

Boys and Diamonds is the debut studio album by husband-and-wife electronica duo Rainbow Arabia. It was released on German electronic record label Kompakt on February 28, 2011, and on March 1, 2011, in the United States.

== Critical reception ==
Boys and Diamonds received widely varying reviews from critics, ranging from an F from Consequence of Sound to an A− from Robert Christgau. Critics who gave the album negative reviews often criticized it for being derivative of world music, or for not living up to the potential of mixing it with electronic pop, as had been Rainbow Arabia's intention. Other critics, though, like Chris Power, praised the album in spite of its derivativeness, because of its memorable hooks, while Allmusic's Rick Anderson wrote that the album exhibited "a well-developed and highly personal sound that draws from any number of exotic musical cultures without depending too much on any one of them."

Professional ratings
Aggregate scores
Source	Rating
Metacritic	(61%)
Review scores
Source	Rating
AllMusic	4/5 stars
Consequence of Sound	F
Drowned in Sound	6/10
Filter	80%
Pitchfork Media	4.9/10
PopMatters	6/10 stars
Robert Christgau	A–
Tiny Mix Tapes	1.5/5 marks

== Track listing ==
1. Boys and Diamonds
2. Without You
3. Blind
4. Nothin Gonna Be Undone
5. Papai
6. Jungle Bear
7. Hai
8. Mechanical
9. This Life is Practice
10. Sayer
11. Sequenced

== Personnel ==
- Mark Chalecki – mastering
- Mudrock – mixing, producer
- Rainbow Arabia – engineer, primary artist, producer
- Dylan Ryan – drums
- Devin Troy Strother – artwork
