= The Golden Ravedays =

Studio album by Superpitcher
- Released: December 15, 2017
- Genre: Indie dance, downtempo, breakbeat, Balearic beat, dub reggae, ambient
- Length: 353:41
- Label: Hippie Dance; TGR001 through TGR012; TGR013 (box set)
- Producer: Superpitcher

Superpitcher chronology
So Far So Super (2016)	The Golden Ravedays (2017)

The Golden Ravedays is the third studio album by Aksel Schaufler under his alias of Superpitcher. It was released by his label Hippie Dance over the course of 2017, with one 12" "chapter" vinyl record released at the end of each month (barring The Golden Ravedays 12, released mid-December.) The album has been described as autobiographical, inspired by all of Schaufler's favourite musical touchstones. Schaufler wished to release all of the songs included in their original lengths, which necessitated the release of a series of 12" records.

The end of 2017 saw the release of a boxset called The Golden Ravedays Collection that included all twelve 12" records with a poster and book; the 12th installment was also released in an edition that contained the box, poster and book for those who had already purchased the other 11 installments. All twelve parts were also released digitally through Bandcamp.

== Contents and production ==
Instead of returning directly to tech house, Schaufler decided to create a record based on all of his own influences. As such, the album runs a gamut of indie dance, dub reggae, post-punk, Balearic beat, broken beat, Philly soul, Americana and downtempo music. Only one song, "Resistance", is a tech house song. "Flying" and "Sleepy Head" are two full-length ambient pieces; elsewhere, most songs disassemble into ambient reflections of themselves instead of fading out or cutting off. The Golden Ravedays 5 was primarily influenced by South African music, while The Golden Ravedays 10, released just before Halloween, was purposefully "spookier" than other installments, featuring outsider house producer Rebolledo growling out the lyrics on "Rock & Roll Baby".

Stylistically, the album touches on various forms of melancholy, either in a straightforward manner, or with a knowing twist to it. "Bluesin" is an extended blues song; "Protest Song" and "Resistance" reflect politicized anger, particularly at the Paris attacks from 2015-2017. "Andy" is dedicated to pop artist Andy Warhol, while "Yves" is dedicated to fashion designer Yves Saint Laurent, and the suffering that both artists lived through.

== Reception ==
Professional ratings
Review scores
Source	Rating
Pitchfork Media	(6.6/10) link
Resident Advisor	(3.5/5) link

The Golden Ravedays received mixed reviews. Bruce Tantum, writing for Resident Advisor, said that "the electric piano, organ and wistful lyrics—"Hey, little raver / do you remember?"—on "Little Raver" grab you from the start" and that the album - and by extension, its author - has "the patience to let a tune unfold slowly." Writing for Pitchfork, Philip Sherburne noted that "several songs mark the welcome return of Superpitcher’s trademark velvet touch," but notes that the album's more leftfield offerings are potentially better.

Ultimately, both reviewers' main complaint with the album was its six-hour length, with Sherburne noting, "The Golden Ravedays is crying out for an edited version, something to distill all Schaufler’s jokes and poems and scribbles into a manageable frame." Several songs also got pegged for wearing thin quickly, with Tantum citing "Mirage," "Rock & Roll Baby" and "Resistance" as examples. Sherburne pointed out that a few songs sounded too derivative of artists like DJ Shadow and Röyksopp.

== Track listing ==
All tracks are written by Aksel Schaufler.

The Golden Ravedays 1
No.	Title	Length
1.	"Little Raver"	10:26
2.	"Snow Blind"	14:44
Total length:		25:10

The Golden Ravedays 2
No.	Title	Length
1.	"What Do You Miss ?"	16:01
2.	"Let's Play Doctor"	18:14
Total length:		34:15

The Golden Ravedays 3
No.	Title	Length
1.	"1984"	11:23
2.	"Pocket Love"	17:42
Total length:		29:05

The Golden Ravedays 4
No.	Title	Length
1.	"Blood & Berry"	12:21
2.	"Howl"	14:45
Total length:		27:06

The Golden Ravedays 5
No.	Title	Length
1.	"Bluesin"	17:08
2.	"Burkina"	13:38
Total length:		30:46

The Golden Ravedays 6
No.	Title	Length
1.	"Protest Song"	13:47
2.	"Resistance"	14:06
Total length:		27:53

The Golden Ravedays 7
No.	Title	Length
1.	"Andy"	14:28
2.	"Yves"	19:42
Total length:		34:10

The Golden Ravedays 8
No.	Title	Length
1.	"Tuesday Paris Texas"	15:20
2.	"Mirage"	15:17
Total length:		30:37

The Golden Ravedays 9
No.	Title	Length
1.	"Hiding"	16:15
2.	"Flying"	16:21
Total length:		32:36

The Golden Ravedays 10
No.	Title	Length
1.	"Rock & Roll Baby"	14:58
2.	"Shining"	15:29
Total length:		30:27

The Golden Ravedays 11
No.	Title	Length
1.	"Brothers"	12:35
2.	"Sleepy Head"	11:56
Total length:		24:31

The Golden Ravedays 12
No.	Title	Length
1.	"Late Night Skanking"	11:50
2.	"Punky Reggae Party"	15:15
Total length:		27:05

== Credits ==
- Aksel Schaufler - writer, producer, main performer
- Rebolledo - vocals on "Rock & Roll Baby"
- Titaua - voice on "Tuesday Paris Texas"
- Fedor - Electric and acoustic slide guitar on "Bluesin'" and "Tuesday Paris Texas"
- Matthias Schaufler - cover artwork
- Oscar Cochois-Baur - cover artwork
- Arthur Bonifay - cover artwork
- Nicolas Choye - cover artwork
- Pierre Vanni - cover artwork
- Jean Gabriel Franchini - cover artwork
- Valentin Fontaine - cover artwork
- Bastien Sozoo - cover artwork
- Lou Benesch - cover artwork
- Esteban Gonzalez - cover artwork
