= Total =

Total may refer to:

== Mathematics ==
- Total, the summation of a set of numbers
- Total order, a partial order without incomparable pairs
- Total relation, which may also mean
  - connected relation (a binary relation in which any two elements are comparable).
- Total function, a partial function that is also a total relation

== Business ==
- TotalEnergies, a French petroleum company, formerly known as Total
- Total (cereal), a food brand by General Mills
- Total, a brand of strained yogurt made by Fage
- Total, a database management system marketed by Cincom Systems
- Total Linhas Aéreas, a Brazilian airline
- Total, a line of dental products by Colgate

== Music and culture ==
- Total (group), an American R&B girl group
- Total: From Joy Division to New Order, a compilation album
- Total (Sebastian album)
- Total (Total album)
- Total (Teenage Bottlerocket album)
- Total (Seigmen album)
- Total (Wanessa album)
- Total (Belinda Peregrín album)
- Total 1, an annual compilation album
- Total, the one time recording name of British musician Matthew Bower
- Total!, a British videogames magazine

== Sports ==
- Total (football club)

== See also ==
- La Totale!, a 1991 French spy comedy film remade as the 1994 American film True Lies
- Total Guitar, a UK guitar related music magazine
- TOTALe, a software suite related to Rosetta Stone (software)
- Total war, a large-scale military conflict
- Totaled, the write-off of a damaged vehicle on cost grounds
- Totally (disambiguation)
