= Philip Sherburne =

American music journalist, producer and DJ

Philip Sherburne is an American music journalist, critic, musician and DJ. He is based in Barcelona, Spain. He is noted for coining the term "microhouse" in a 2001 article for The Wire and for appearing in the documentary film Speaking in Code (2009).

== Career ==
Sherburne began to write about electronic and experimental music in the late 1990s. In 2001, while writing for The Wire, he coined the umbrella term "microhouse" in an article examining a new generation of minimal house and techno producers. The term subsequently entered wider use within electronic music criticism and is now widely associated with the development of the genre.

Sherburne has written extensively on electronic music for The Wire, Pitchfork, Resident Advisor, Spin, The New York Times, Slate, Frieze, Wired, XLR8R, Grooves, De:Bug and other publications. He joined Pitchfork as a contributor in 2005 and later became a contributing editor. His criticism has focused primarily on electronic, experimental and underground music. Sherburne has been recognised as one of the leading English-language writers on contemporary electronic music.

In addition to journalism, Sherburne has contributed essays to several books on contemporary music, including Audio Culture: Readings in Modern Music, The Pitchfork 500: Our Guide to the Greatest Songs from Punk to the Present, Time Out 1000 Songs to Change Your Life, Best Music Writing 2011 and Epiphanies: Life-Changing Encounters with Music.

Sherburne has also worked as an international DJ, performing throughout Europe, North America and Latin America. His music productions and remixes have been released on the Lan Muzic and Resopal Red labels.

In 2009, Sherburne appeared as one of the principal subjects in Amy Grill's documentary Speaking in Code, which follows several prominent figures in international techno culture over a three-year period. The film documents his relocation from the United States to Europe and his career as both a journalist and DJ.

== Discography ==
- Philip Sherburne, "Lumberjacking" (Lan Muzic, 2007)
- Guillaume & the Coutu Dumonts, "Les Gans (Philip Sherburne Remix)" (Musique Risquée, 2008)
- Peter Van Hoesen, "L.O.C. (Philip Sherburne's Lungbutter Remix)" (Lan Muzic, 2008)
- Philip Sherburne, Salt & Vinegar EP (Lan Muzic, 2008)
- Echologist feat. Spaceape, The Mercy Dubz: Philip Sherburne's Triple Bypass Dub + Philip Sherburne's Resurrection Dub (Resopal Red, 2009)
