= Chromophobia (album) =

Studio album by Gui Boratto
- Released: 26 February 2007
- Genres: House; progressive house; techno; minimal techno
- Label: Kompakt

Gui Boratto chronology
Chromophobia (2007)	Take My Breath Away (2009)

Singles from Chromophobia
- 1. "Gate 7" Released: 2006

Professional ratings
Review scores
Source	Rating
Pitchfork	8.3/10

Chromophobia is the debut studio album by Brazilian electronic music producer Gui Boratto. It was released on 26 February 2007 on the Kompakt label. Boratto plays guitar and piano on the album, and all vocals are by Luciana Villanova. It was named the 43rd best album of the decade by Resident Advisor.

Regarding the name Chromophobia, Boratto said: "The same meaning as monochromatism in architecture, which means simplicity. That's all. I don’t have a morbid fear of colors at all. But also, I was ironic. My music is really colorful."

== Track listing ==
All tracks by Gui Boratto, except where noted.

1. "Scene 1" – 3:55
2. "Mr. Decay" – 6:58
3. "Terminal" – 5:57
4. "Gate 7" – 6:41
5. "Shebang" – 7:28
6. "Chromophobia" – 7:12
7. "The Blessing" – 5:40
8. "Malá Strana" – 2:31
9. "Acróstico" – 4:25
10. "Xilo" – 3:55
11. "Beautiful Life" (Boratto, Luciana Villanova) – 8:31
12. "Hera" – 3:59
13. "The Verdict" – 3:37

== Personnel ==
- Gui Boratto – guitar, piano, production, engineering, mastering, mixing
- Luciana Villanova – vocals
