= Cydonia (album) =

Studio album by the Orb
- Released: 27 February 2001
- Recorded: 1998
- Genres: Ambient house; trip hop; IDM; drum and bass
- Length: 68:38
- Labels: Island; MCA
- Producers: Alex Paterson; Thomas Fehlmann; Andy Hughes

The Orb chronology
Orblivion (1997)	Cydonia (2001)	Bicycles & Tricycles (2004)

Cydonia is the fifth studio album by English electronic music duo the Orb. It was released on 27 February 2001 in the United Kingdom by Island Records and in the United States by MCA Records. Members Alex Paterson and Thomas Fehlmann, along with usual collaborators Andy Hughes, Nick Burton, and Simon Phillips, wrote and produced the album for a planned 1999 release. Featured on the album are Robert Fripp, John Roome, and Fil Le Gonidec, who had previously only worked with the Orb in live performances.

== Production ==
Unlike previous Orb albums, Cydonia featured several 'proper' songs with vocals, which critics felt did not sound similar to Orb songs. Singers Nina Walsh and Aki Omori appeared on two tracks each on Cydonia, providing vocals and co-writing lyrics with Paterson, who felt that this new direction for the Orb was more similar to the experimental work of Orbus Terrarum, rather than the poppish techno of Orblivion.

The Orb produced two CDs worth of material for the album and eventually cut it down for the final release. However, to the displeasure of Paterson, large portions of both CDs were leaked through Napster. As Island Records was trapped in major-label-restructuring limbo because of its recent merger between the MCA and PolyGram families that created Universal Music Group, Cydonia was not released until 2001. "It's a strange situation," Paterson noted at the time, "I'm getting more contact out of my pet terrapins than I am out of my record company."

== Critical reception ==
Professional ratings
Aggregate scores
Source	Rating
Metacritic	64/100
Review scores
Source	Rating
AllMusic	2.5/5 stars
Alternative Press	3/5 stars
Dotmusic	6/10
Muzik	5/5 stars
NME	3/10
NOW	3/5 stars
Pitchfork	6.1/10
Release Magazine	6/10
Rolling Stone	3/5 stars
Uncut	3/5 stars

"Ghostdancing" (2001)
Clip from "Ghostdancing" of the trip hop and drum and bass influenced Cydonia.

Upon release, critics noted that Cydonia merged pop, trance, and ambient-dub, which they felt to be a conglomeration of bland vocals and uninventive ambience. NME harshly described it as "a stillborn relic, flawed throughout by chronically stunted ambitions" and describing its only appropriate audience to be "old ravers" seeking nostalgia. With the album came the single "Once More" featuring remixes from Bedrock and Mark Pritchard. Paterson believed that "Centuries", another vocal piece from Cydonia, was also worth releasing as a single, but Island chose to wait and see how successful the album was before making a final decision. Not only did the album receive poor reviews, but the Orb was frequently regarded by the UK press as past the peak years of the creative years, being an "ambient dinosaur" out of place in the current dance music environment. After the release of Cydonia, Hughes left the group, becoming "another acrimonious departure from The Orb".

== Track listing ==
=== Pre-release version (1999) ===
1. "Once More" – 4:42
2. "Promis" – 5:27
3. "Ghostdancing" – 7:29
4. "Turn It Down" – 8:44
5. "Mile Long Lump of Lard" – 8:28
6. "Ralf" – 7:40
7. "Freely Wheely" – 7:22
8. "Yungle" – 10:34
9. "Terminus" – 10:58

=== UK edition (2001) ===
1. "Once More" – 4:17
2. "Promis" – 5:27
3. "Ghostdancing" – 7:29
4. "Turn It Down" – 8:38
5. "Egnable" – 1:59
6. "Firestar" – 0:46
7. "A Mile Long Lump of Lard" – 6:21
8. "Centuries" – 4:22
9. "Plum Island" – 5:22
10. "Hamlet of Kings" – 7:56
11. "1.1.1" – 0:36
12. "EDM" – 4:12
13. "Thursday's Keeper" – 4:09
14. "Terminus" – 11:16 (w/ Robert Fripp)

=== Remastered and Expanded edition (2008) ===
CD1

1. "Once More" – 4:17
2. "Promis" – 5:27
3. "Ghostdancing" – 7:29
4. "Turn It Down" – 8:38
5. "Egnable" – 1:59
6. "Firestar" – 0:46
7. "A Mile Long Lump of Lard" – 6:21
8. "Centuries" – 4:22
9. "Plum Island" – 5:22
10. "Hamlet of Kings" – 7:56
11. "1.1.1" – 0:36
12. "EDM" – 4:12
13. "Thursday's Keeper" – 4:09
14. "Terminus" – 11:16 (w/ Robert Fripp)

CD2

1. "Centuries (Eurofen Mix)" – 4:42
2. "Ghostdancing (version)" – 6:45
3. "Hamlet of Kings (version)" – 7:58
4. "Firestar (version)" – 1:14
5. "Centuries (Wine, Woman & King Mix)" – 4:01
6. "Once More (Scourge of the Earth Mix)" – 4:53
7. "Plum Island (Flat Mix)" – 5:21
8. "Promis (version)" – 5:46
9. "Once More (Bedrock Edit 2)" – 8:04
10. "Turn It Down (Long Version)" – 9:03
11. "Terminus (Andy's Mix)" – 11:07
