= Sect (band) =

Brazilian Eurodance band

- Origin: Brazil
- Genres: Eurodance, dance-pop
- Years active: 1994–2005
- Labels: Don't Stop; Spotlight; Paradoxx
- Past members: Tchorta; Gui Boratto; Patrícia Coelho; Alyssa Cavin

Sect was a Brazilian Eurodance band, formed in 1994, consisting of producers Jorge Tchorta Boratto and Gui Boratto, with Patrícia Coelho. and later Alyssa Cavin as lead vocalist.

It is considered the country's first successful electronic music project. also one of the first Brazilian bands to stand out in the English language in the lyrics of their songs.

The group became known for the hit and its biggest success, "Follow You (Crazy for You)", from the album Eleven, released in 1994, which was part of the soundtrack of the telenovela História de Amor. The band was successful in Brazilian clubs in the 90s. and was heavily played on the radio. Another relatively successful song was “Wasting My Life”.

== History ==
In 1994, they released the EP "F&D", on the Velas label. It is on this EP that the group recorded the single "Follow You". In 1995, they released the album Eleven. In 1998, Patrícia Coelho was replaced by the vocalist, Alyssa Cavin.

== Discography ==
=== F & D (1994) ===
Track list

1. Fly
2. Follow You
3. Dance
4. Deep Inside

=== Eleven (1995) ===
Track list

1. Wasting My Life
2. Little Brother
3. I Can't Stop Loving You
4. Get Away
5. Face
6. Follow You
7. Light
8. Walk Away
9. Things I Say
10. Dance Across The Floor
11. Follow You (Club Mix)
12. Wasting My Life (Club Mix)

== Singles ==
- Follow You
- Wasting My Life
- I Can't Stop Loving You
- Get Away
- Walk Away
- Face
- Never Know How Much I Love You (1999)
- Can't Stop The World (2002)
