= Ulf Lohmann =

German electronic music producer

Ulf Lohmann is a German electronic music producer most popular for his releases on Kompakt. He has released an album, Because Before (2001), and several singles. Much of his work has been featured on Kompakt's Pop Ambient series.
