= Wighnomy Brothers =

Electronic music duo from Germany

- Origin: Jena; Thuringia; Germany
- Genres: Deep house Minimal techno Electronic music
- Years active: 1997–2009
- Labels: Freude-Am-Tanzen; Kompakt; Vakant; Musik Krause
- Members: Gabor Schablitzki (aka) Robag Wruhme; Sören Bodner (aka) Monkey Maffia
- Website: wighnomy-brothers.de

Wighnomy Brothers were an electronic music duo from Jena, Germany, composed of Gabor Schablitzki (a.k.a. Robag Wruhme) and Sören Bodner (a.k.a. Monkey Maffia). Wighnomy Brothers' live mixes include an eclectic blend of deep house, minimal techno, jazz, and soul, and their original releases are infused with a unique deep-house sound. They have released their music on Freude-Am-Tanzen, Kompakt, Vakant, Broque and other electronic music labels.

== History ==
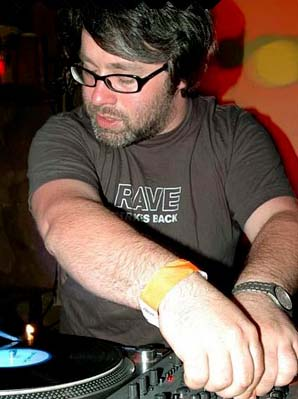
Gabor Schablitzki

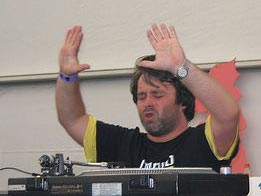
Sören Bodner a.k.a. Monkey Maffia

Schablitzki and Bodner met in the late 1980s in Communist East Germany where they shared an interest in break dancing, hip-hop, and early electronica. Schablitzki began producing with Volker Kahl in 1996 under the pseudonym "Beefcake." By 1997, Schablitzki and Bodner became residents at the renowned "Club Kassablanca," and began producing original tracks as the "Wighnomy Brothers."

The Wighnomy Brothers have toured all over the world since then, but hadn't made their United States debut until May 21, 2009 at the Middlesex Lounge in Boston, Massachusetts at the Make It New night.

Schablitzki and Bodner appeared as main characters in Amy Grill's electronic music documentary "Speaking In Code," which chronicles the Wighnomy Brothers' rising popularity in the early 2000s and Gabor's subsequent break from techno music in 2006-07.

In late 2009, Schablitzki and Bodner announced that they will be retiring the Wighnomy Brothers project at the end of the year but will continue DJing and producing music separately.

== Discography ==
Releases

- Ill Restorante Della (12"), Freude Am Tanzen, 2001
- Wighnomy EP (12", EP), Freude Am Tanzen, 2002
- 24/7 You (12"), Nightclubbing Music, 2003
- Bodyrock EP (12", EP), Freude Am Tanzen, 2003
- Hide You Im Schrankwand Gewand (12"), WB Records 2003
- Something For Your Mind (Bewegungsmelder Remix) (12"), WB Records 2003
- Pusta Reime Im Knubbelbenz Verfahren (12"), WB Records, 2004
- Somewhere Over The Slippybergün (12"), WB Records, 2004
- Speicher 19 (12"), Kompakt Extra, 2004
- 3 Fachmisch EP (12", EP), Freude Am Tanzen, 2005
- Crackerjack Acid EP (EP), Metromusic, 2005
- Nativetonguetwisterhood / Gottogoaway (12"), WB Records, 2005
- Speicher 31 (12"), Kompakt Extra, 2005
- Moppal Kiff (12"), Freude Am Tanzen, 2006
- Okkasion EP (12", EP), Freude Am Tanzen, 2006
- Guppipeitsche (12"), Freude Am Tanzen, 2007
- Metawuffmischfelge (CD, Comp, Mixed), Freude Am Tanzen, 2008
- Speicher 64 (12"), Kompakt Extra, 2009
