= The Rice Twins =

Swedish techno-duo

The Rice Twins is a Swedish techno-duo from Stockholm, formed in 2005 by Valdemar Gezelius and Jesper Engström.

2006 they released the song For Penny and Alexis and EP Reach For the Flute.
