= Robert Babicz =

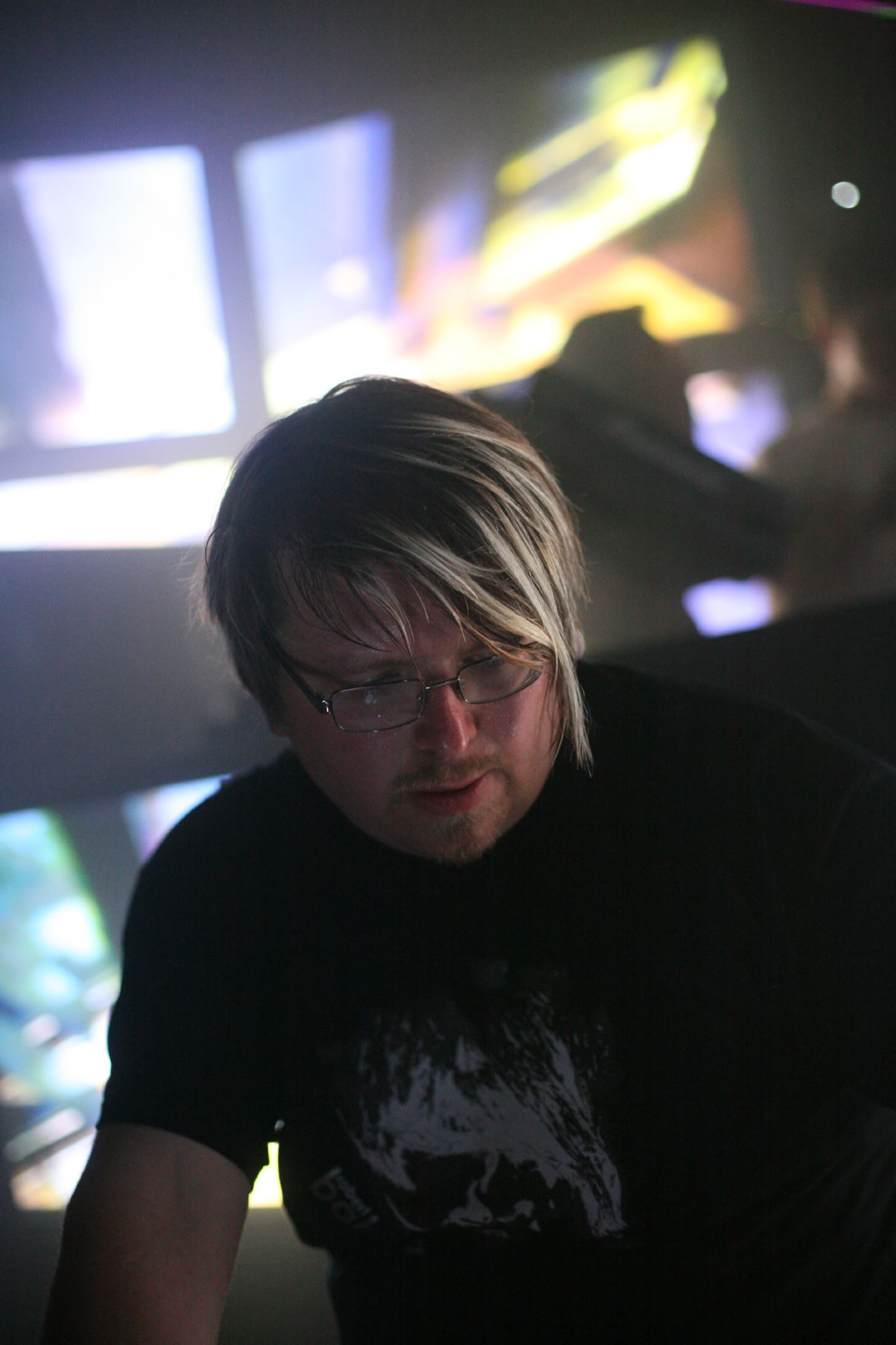

Background information
- Also known as: Rob Acid, Acid Warrior, Department of Dance, Church Window, Atlon Inc, Sontec, Pumpgun Pro, Colone, Origin, Dicabor, Tannenhof, Twirl
- Born: Robert Babicz; Niemodlin, Poland
- Origin: Berlin, Germany
- Genres: House, techno
- Occupations: Disc jockey, record producer, mastering engineer
- Labels: Babiczstyle, Mille Plateaux, Systematic Recordings, Bedrock Recordings
- Website: http://www.robertbabicz.de

Robert Babicz (born January 5, 1973, in Niemodlin, Poland) is a Polish-born music producer, mastering engineer and live performer living in Malta. With a career spanning nearly three decades covering genres from techno to acid house to minimal, Robert has also been known under the pseudonyms Rob Acid, Acid Warrior, Department of Dance and Sontec amongst many others. He has released a number of well respected records on labels such as Kompakt, Systematic Recordings, Treibstoff, Bedrock, Intec Digital and Steve Bug's Audiomatique, as well his own labels, Junkfood, Babiczstyle and Dirtcut. He is well known as a live performer rather than a DJ, as he uses synths and live equipment and improvises in every set he plays.

== Biography ==
Robert Babicz moved to Germany in 1980 and began making dance music in the early 1990s, when acid house was at its peak of popularity. His first official release was as his Colone persona with the record Acid Science Trax in 1992. In May 1994, he founded his first label, Junkfood Records, with Michael Zosel and released many 12"s over the next decade. In 1999 he released his first ambient album using his real name, Robert Babicz on Mille Plateaux, completing another album for them only a year later.

At the turn of the new millennium, Robert Babicz strived to create new sound and thus began another label, Shortcut. He also began to receive requests to do sound design for hardware and software companies, and he did some sound design for Native Instruments at this time.

Robert Babicz's album A Cheerful Temper was released on Systematic Recordings in 2007. The record incorporates electronica, techno, minimal, house and classic house styles. He followed this album up in 2010 with Immortal Changes again on Systematic, and was described by DJ Magazine as a "marriage of organic grooves and glistening electronic melodies".

Since Immortal Changes, Robert has released a string of singles on various labels such as Bedrock Records, Bang Bang and Treibstoff Recordings. Perhaps the most significant event of the last couple of years has been the founding of Robert Babicz's new label 'Babiczstyle'. In his own words, "I do this to have a platform with the highest possible audio quality and have a place for me and my friends to release our music" and he has thus far released 4 EPs and a compilation album of some of his earlier tracks. In late November 2021 he released his masterclass to help educate and inspire upcoming music producers".

== Selected discography ==
Albums

- MoMente - 1999 - Mille Plateaux
- Desert - 2000 - Mille Plateaux
- Sure Sipr - 2004 - Punkt Music
- A Cheerful Temper - 2007 - Systematic Recordings
- Immortal Changes - 2010 - Immortal Changes
- Robert Babicz Vol 001 - 2011 - Babiczstyle
- The Owl and the Butterfly - 2013 - Systematic Recordings

Babiczstyle EPs

- Remote Kiss EP - 2010
- The Feeling EP - 2010
- Nectar EP - 2011
- What a Day EP - 2011
- Little Fairy EP - 2018
