= Andy Hughes =

- Born: Andrew Paul Hughes; 11 November 1965; Harrow, Middlesex
- Died: 12 June 2009 (aged 43) London, England
- Genres: Electronic
- Occupation: Producer
- Formerly of: The Orb

Andy Hughes (11 November 1965 – 12 June 2009) was an English electronic music producer. He is best known for his work with the Orb, where he helped mix and produce Orbus Terrarum, Orblivion, and Cydonia, as well as the Orb's singles from this period. Hughes left the Orb during the production of Cydonia, which was reworked after his departure. In 2009, he mastered the Orb's Baghdad Batteries (Orbsessions Volume III) for release. He also did additional original production work and performed remixes for the Cranberries and Tangerine Dream.

Prior to his Orb years he had helped to design and build the studios for Bunk Junk & Genius and worked with many famous artists.

Andy Hughes died aged 43 of liver failure, at the Liver Intensive Care Unit at King's College Hospital in London, on 12 June 2009. He had one son and one daughter.
