= Dettinger =

- Birth name: Olaf Dettinger
- Origin: Germany
- Genres: Electronic; Ambient; IDM; Minimal techno
- Occupation: Producer
- Years active: 1998 to Present
- Labels: Kompakt

Dettinger is a German record producer signed to Germany's Cologne based Kompakt label.

His releases include 1998's Blond 12", 1999's album Intershop (the first single-artist LP on Kompakt), Puma 12" and Totentanz 12", and 2000's album Oasis. Dettinger's tracks have appeared on a range on compilations, including Kompakt's Total and Pop Ambient series and Mille Plateaux's Click + Cuts series. Dettinger has produced remixes for artists such as Pet Shop Boys, Closer Musik and Jürgen Paape. He has also collaborated with Frank Rumpelt and M.G. Bondino.

== Discography ==
=== Albums ===
- Intershop (1999)
- Oasis (2000)

=== Singles ===
- Blond (1998)
- Puma (1999)
- Totentanz (1999)

=== Remixes ===
- Tocotronic – Jackpot
- Process – Estero Re Re Mix
- Jürgen Paape – So Weit Wie Noch Nie
- Closer Musik – One Two Three No Gravity
- Triola – Ral 7035
- Pet Shop Boys – Gomorrah
