= Matias Aguayo =

German-Chilean techno producer and DJ

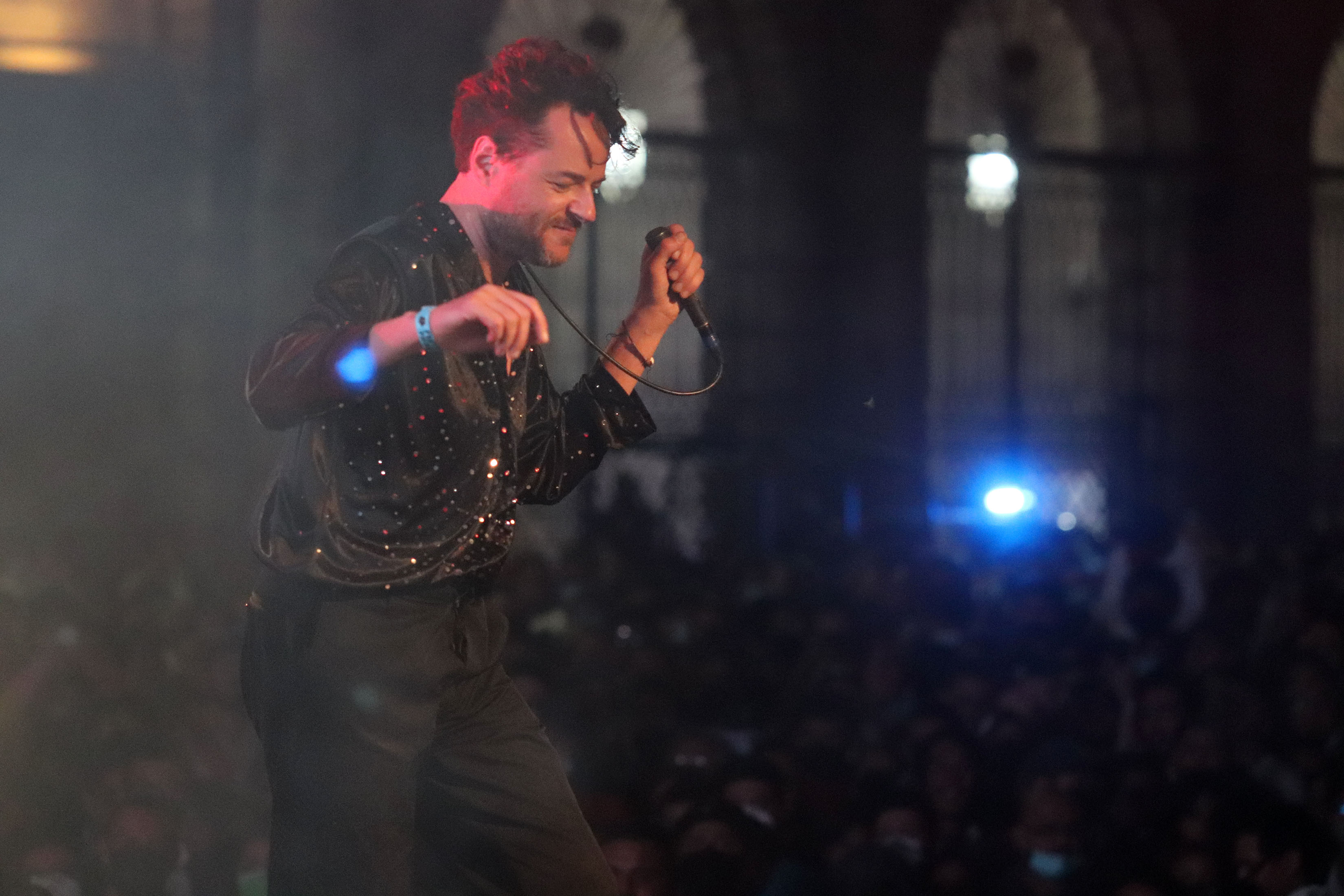
Matias Aguayo performing in 2022 in Mexico City

Matias Aguayo (born 22 September 1973) is a Chilean-German techno producer and DJ.

He was born in Santiago, Chile. Aguayo grew up in Gummersbach, Germany. In 1997, working with Michael Mayer under the project name Zimt, he released his debut single "U.O.A.A." on the label Ladomat 2000. Shortly afterwards he founded the project Closer Musik with Dirk Leyers. In 2004, the group disbanded and Aguayo launched his solo career with the album Are You Really Lost?.

In 2006, Aguayo was one of four organizers of the Bumbumbox parties, which took place unannounced in the public space of various major cities in South America. The party organizers then founded the techno label Cómeme, which focuses on releasing music by South American producers.

== Albums ==
- Are You Really Lost? (Kompakt, 2005)
- Ay Ay Ay (Kompakt, 2009)
- The Visitor (Cómeme, 2013)
- Support Alien Invasion (Cómeme, Crammed Discs, 2019)
- Anenoa (Serendeepity, 2026)
