= Gui Boratto =

Brazilian electronic music producer (born 1974)

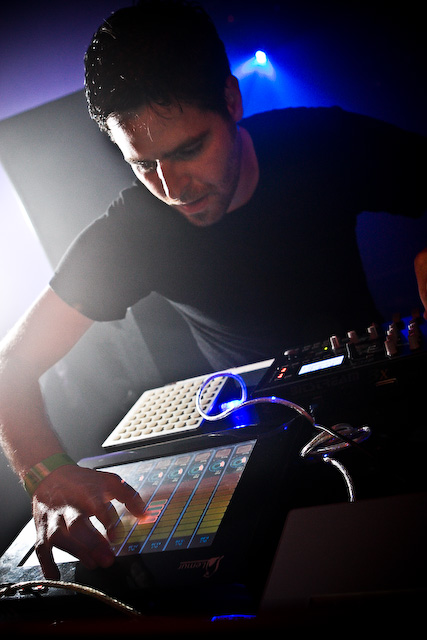
- Boratto performing in 2008

Background information
- Born: Guilherme Boratto; 1974 (age 51–52)
- Origin: São Paulo, Brazil
- Genre: House
- Occupation: Record producer
- Years active: 1994–present
- Label: Kompakt
- Website: guiboratto.com.br

Guilherme Boratto (born 1974) is a Brazilian electronic music producer. In the 1990s, he was a member of the Eurodance group Sect.

His debut solo record, Chromophobia, was named album of the month by Mixmag. He has since released six more full-length albums as well as numerous EPs and singles.

Boratto owns the record label D.O.C., distributed by Kompakt. The first artist he signed was the Brazilian electronic duo Elekfantz.

Onstage, Boratto uses a laptop equipped with Ableton Live, a JazzMutant Lemur, a monome, and an Akai Professional APC40. He sometimes invites guest guitarists to join him.

== Discography ==
=== Studio albums ===
- Chromophobia (2007)
- Take My Breath Away (2009)
- III (2011)
- The K2 Chapter (2013)
- Abaporu (2014)
- Pentagram (2018)
- Backstage (2020)

=== EPs ===
- Twiggy (2005)
- Sunrise (2006)
- Beluga (2006)
- Like You (2006)
- Division (2006)
- It's Majik (2006)
- Atol (Remixes) (2007)
- Royal House (2007)
- The Rivington EP (2007)
- Eurasia (2007)
- The Rivington Remixes (2008)
- Atomic Soda (2008)
- Notations (2009)
- Azzurra (2010)
- This Is Not the End Remixe (2012)

=== Selected singles ===
- "Arquipélago" (2005)
- "Speicher 38" (2006)
- "Brazilian Soccer – Edition (Paralelo, Tipologia)" (2006)
- "Sozinho" (2006)
- "Gate 7" (2006)
- "Chromophobia Remixe, Pt. 1" (2007)
- "Chromophobia Remixe, Pt. 2" (2007)
- "Speicher 55" (2007)
- "Tales from the Lab" (2008)
- "No Turning Back" (2009)
- "The Drill" (2011)
- "Too Late" (2013)
- "Take Control" (2014)
- "Animal Machine" (2015)
- "Drink in Paris" (2023)
- "Déjeuner Sur L'Herbe" (2023)

=== Selected remixes ===
List of songs remixed by Gui Boratto
Year	Original Artist	Title
2004	Kaleidoscópio	"Você Me Apareceu (Gui Boratto Horn Mix)"
2006	Agoria	"Baboul Hair Cuttin' (Gui Boratto Remix)"
2006	Oscar	"Freak Inside (Gui Boratto Remix)""
2007	Eyerer and Chopstick	"Haunting (Gui Boratto Remix)"
2007	Guy J and Sahar Z	"Hazui (Gui Boratto Remix)"
2007	Monoroom	"Memory Inc (Gui Boratto Remix)"
2007	Zentex	"Pimioe (Gui Boratto Remix)"
2007	Tube & Berger featuring Vanity	"Funky Shit (Gui Boratto Remix)"
2007	Delon and Dalcan	"Beyond Clouds (Gui Boratto Remix)"
2007	Robert Babicz	"Sin (Gui Boratto Remix)"
2007	Sian	"Flood (Gui Boratto Remix)"
2007	Will Saul and Tam Cooper	"Sequential Circus (Gui Boratto Remix)"
2007	Tocadisco feat. Lennart A. Salomon	"Better Begin (Gui Boratto Remix)"
2007	Phonique	"Space Cruise (feat. Gui Borrato Phonique Version)"
2007	Oliver Klein	"ReKraft (Gui Boratto Version)"
2007	Goldfrapp	"A&E (Gui Boratto Remix)"
2008	Patrice D Angello and Nick Holson	"One Day (Gui Borratto Remix)"
2008	Philip Flindt	"Forward (Gui Boratto Remix)"
2008	Adam Freeland	"Silverlake Pills (Gui Boratto Remix)"
2008	Bomb the Bass	"Black River (featuring Mark Lanegan)” (Gui Boratto Remix)"
2008	Sam Taylor Wood & Pet Shop Boys	"I'm in Love with a German Film Star (Gui Boratto Remix)"
2009	Pet Shop Boys	"Love Etc. (Gui Boratto Remix)"
2009	Solee	"Impressed (Gui Boratto Remix)"
2009	Moby	"Pale Horses (Gui Boratto’s Last Window Remix)"
2009	Massive Attack	"Paradise Circus (Gui Boratto Mix)"
2010	Alexis Tyrel	"Rebecca Loos (Gui Boratto Remix)"
2010	Way Out West	"The Gift (Gui Boratto's Fallopian Remix)"
2010	Trentemoller	"Sycamore Feeling"
2012	Neil Davidge	"Awakening (Halo 4 Original Soundtrack) (Gui Boratto Remix)"
2012	Battles	"Wall Street (Gui Boratto Remix)""
2012	Stimming & David August	"Sexy Biest (Gui Boratto Remix)"
2013	Wankelmut feat. Emma Louise	"My Head is a Jungle (Gui Boratto Remix)"
2015	Melon	"Air (Gui Boratto Remix)"
2017	London Grammar	"Big Picture (Gui Boratto Rework)"
2025	MOTO SOLO	"There's Another Way (Gui Boratto's Rework)"
