= Jörg Burger =

German record producer

Jörg Burger (born 1962) is a German musician, composer and record producer who has had several releases on Kompakt as Triola, including an album, Triola im Fünftonraum, in 2004. He is also in a duo with Wolfgang Voigt.

With his 1997 album Opportunity Knox, released under the pseudonym The Modernist, he "establish[ed] a stripped-down yet tuneful techno sound which would later become a trademark of the Cologne scene centered around the Kompakt label" (as summarized by AllMusic).
