= Jonas Bering =

- Born: 9 November 1975 (age 49)
- Origin: France
- Genres: Electronic music, minimal techno
- Occupation(s): Musician, Composer, Producer
- Years active: 2000 to present
- Labels: Kompakt
- Website: www.JonasBering.com

Jonas Bering (born 9 November 1975) is a French electronic music songwriter, from Lille, France. Jonas Bering emerged from the techno scene of Cologne, Germany, through his works released on the German label Kompakt, run by Wolfgang Voigt, Michael Mayer and Juergen Paape. His debut album "Bienfait" is the first vinyl album released by the Kompakt label for a solo artist. This also makes Jonas Bering the first non-German artist to be featured in the label's catalog.

== Selected discography ==
- Bienfait (CD, 2LP, Album), Kompakt (2000)
- Emballages (12", Kompakt (2000)
- From The Nape Of The Neck (12"), Logarythm (2001)
- Marine (12"), Kompakt (2002)
- Normandie (12"), Kompakt (2003)
- Sketches For The Next Season (12", CD, Album), Kompakt (2003)
- Diva (12"), Defrag Sound Processing (2004)
- Behind This Silence (12"), Kompakt (2006)
- Lost Paradise (12"), Kompakt (2006)
- Cityscape (12"), Kupei Musika (2007) w/Kate Simko
- Can't Stop Loving You (12"), Kompakt (2008) w/ Aubelia Petit
- Behind The Silence (CD, Album), Klik Records/Kompakt (2008)
