= Kompakt =

German record label

- Founded: 1998
- Founder: Wolfgang Voigt
- Genre: Electronic music, microhouse, minimal techno, ambient techno
- Country of origin: Germany
- Location: Cologne
- Official website: kompakt.fm

Kompakt (Labelcode: LC 12012) is a Cologne-based electronic music independent record label and vinyl/CD distributor, owned by Wolfgang Voigt, Michael Mayer and Jürgen Paape. They specialize in microhouse and minimal techno, and are known for their Total compilation series.

== History ==
Kompakt originated from a techno record store that was opened in Cologne in 1993 (under the name "Delirium") by Wolfgang Voigt, Reinhard Voigt, Jörg Burger and Jürgen Paape, who were soon joined by Michael Mayer. Kompakt itself was formally founded in 1998, combining several existing labels, the record store and distributor and also event organizing activities.

According to Grooves magazine, "Kompakt's chief aesthetic objective has always been the perfect marriage of ambient texture and linear 4x4 structure—blending deep, granular sound design with the 4-bar rhythmic intensity and patterning that makes house and techno so club-effective". Kompakt has been noted for releases enriching abstract techno tracks with pop elements such as vocals – Mayer has stated that "We grew up with pop music and really like traces of pop in techno music. This is probably Kompakt's biggest strength-- that we can detect these pop traces and give them a home".

British music critic Simon Reynolds has characterized Kompakt as the "label that's contributed more than any other to Germany's dominance of electronic dance music this decade [the 2000s]".

Notable producers of the label include Superpitcher, Michael Mayer, Justus Köhncke, Rex the Dog and Gui Boratto. In recent years, Kompakt has been better known for bringing a trance sound into minimal techno.

Techno and electronic artists, such as The Orb, Thomas Fehlmann, The Field, Jonas Bering, Aril Brikha, Kenneth James Gibson, and others have released material on Kompakt.

Kompakt also runs an online music store with a weekly newsletter, providing a large amount of techno and other electronic forms and through mailorder. The label used to run its own digital download store at kompakt-mp3.net, which according to Mayer was "[one of the first] techno mp3 shops online", but it was not financially successful and was shut down after three years in late 2008. The company had 16 employees in 2009.

The Kompakt offices and record store appear in Amy Grill's 2009 documentary Speaking in Code, which features interviews with founder Wolfgang Voigt and co-owner Michael Mayer.

== Profan ==
Profan was founded in 1993 by Wolfgang Voigt and was later added as a sublabel to Kompakt. The label primarily featured material by Wolfgang Voigt and his brother Reinhard Voigt. Many critics considered Profan at the cutting edge of '90s electronica. Profan stopped releasing any new material in 2000, but resumed in August 2008 when Wolfgang Voigt's "Freiland Klaviermusik" single was released under the Profan name.

== Selected releases ==
=== Total series ===
- Total 1 (1999)
- Total 2 (2000)
- Total 3 (2001)
- Total 4 (2002)
- Total 5 (2003)
- Total 6 (2005)
- Total 7 (2006)
- Total 8 (2007)
- Total 9 (2008)
- Total 10 (2009)
- Total 11 (2010)
- Total 12 (2011)
- Total 14 (2014)
- Total 15 (2015)
- Total 16 (2016)
- Total 17 (2017)
- Total 18 (2018)
- Total 19 (2019)
- Total 20 (2020)
- Total 21 (2021)
- Total 22 (2022)
- Total 23 (2023)
- Total 24 (2024)

=== Pop Ambient ===
- Pop Ambient 2001 (2001)
- Pop Ambient 2002 (2001)
- Pop Ambient 2003 (2002)
- Pop Ambient 2004 (2003)
- Pop Ambient 2005 (2004)
- Pop Ambient 2006 (2005)
- Pop Ambient 2007 (2006)
- Pop Ambient 2008 (2007)
- Pop Ambient 2009 (2009)
- Pop Ambient 2010 (2010)
- Pop Ambient 2011 (2011)
- Pop Ambient 2012 (2012)
- Pop Ambient 2013 (2013)
- Pop Ambient 2014 (2014)
- Pop Ambient 2015 (2014)
- Pop Ambient 2016 (2015)
- Pop Ambient 2017 (2016)
- Pop Ambient 2018 (2017)
- Pop Ambient 2019 (2018)
- Pop Ambient 2020 (2019)
- Pop Ambient 2021 (2020)
- Pop Ambient 2022 (2021)
- Pop Ambient 2023 (2022)
- Pop Ambient 2024 (2023)
- Pop Ambient 2025 (2024)
- Pop Ambient 2026 (2025)

=== Other releases ===
- Gas – Zauberberg – (1997)
- Gas – Königsforst – (1998)
- Gas – Oktember – (1999)
- Dettinger – Intershop (1999)
- Jonas Bering – Bienfait (2000)
- Gas – Pop – (2000)
- Michael Mayer – Immer (2002)
- Superpitcher – Today (2005)
- The Orb – Okie Dokie It's The Orb on Kompakt (2005)
- Klimek – Music To Fall Asleep (2006)
- Gui Boratto – Chromophobia (2007)
- The Field – From Here We Go Sublime (2007)
- Gui Boratto – Take My Breath Away (2009)
- The Field – Yesterday and Today (2009)
- Panda Bear – Surfer's Hymn Single (2011)
- Rainbow Arabia – Boys and Diamonds (2011)
- WhoMadeWho – Knee Deep (2011)
- GusGus – Arabian Horse (2011)
- Gui Boratto – III (2011)
- WALLS – Coracle (2011)
- Taragana Pyjarama – Tipped Bowls (2012)
- Justus Köhncke – Justus Köhncke & The Wonderful Frequency Band (2013)
- Voigt & Voight – Die Zauberhafte Welt Der Anderen (2013)
- John Tejada – The Predicting Machine (2013)
- Vermont – Vermont (2014)
- Kenneth James Gibson – The Evening Falls (2016)
- Gas – Narkopop – (2017)
- Vermont – II (2017)
- Gui Boratto – Pentagram (2018)
- Gas – Rausch – (2018)
- John Tejada – Dead Start Program (2018)
- Gas – Der Lange Marsch – (2021)
- Dettinger – Oasis (2000) (2024) Reissue

== See also ==
- List of record labels
- List of electronic music record labels
