= Justus Köhncke =

German producer and musician

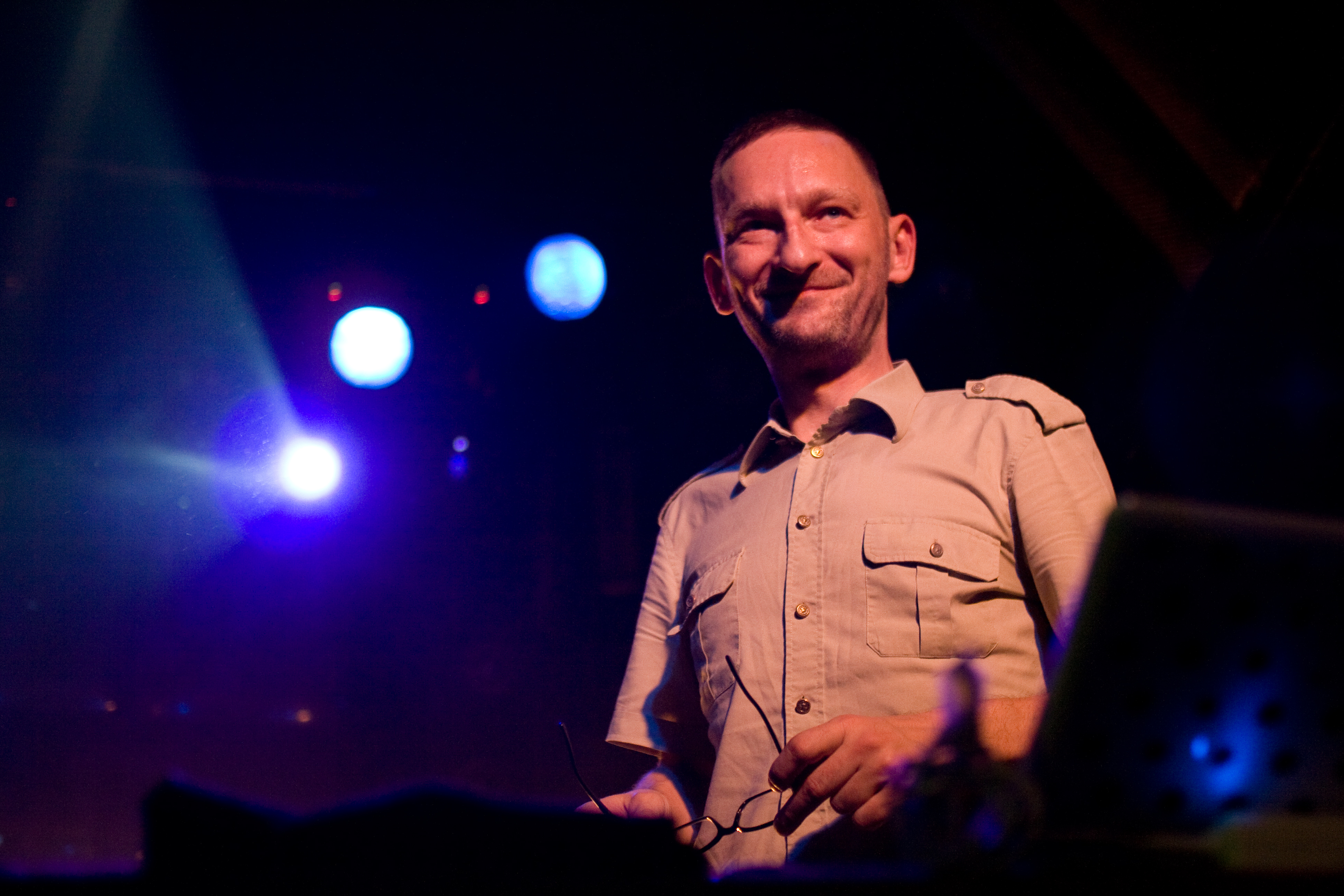
Justus Köhncke in Vienna 2009

Justus Köhncke (born 1966 in Gießen) is a German techno producer and pop musician from Cologne.

Köhncke was a member of the house trio Whirlpool Productions, along with Hans Nieswandt and Eric D. Clark. Together, they had a number one hit in Italy in 1997 with their house track "From Disco to Disco". Since 1999, he has released tracks on the Cologne label Kompakt. In his music, he combines minimal techno with disco and Krautrock elements.

== Musical collaborations ==
In 2004, Köhncke produced the single "Durch die Nacht" for Andreas Dorau. He also worked with Dirk von Lowtzow of Tocotronic, as well as for Phantom/Ghost.

In the last few years, he has also worked on soundtracks with Irmin Schmidt, a member of the band Can. Together with Kai Althoff they produced under the name Subtle Tease.

In 2013, he co-created a side project with Hot Chip frontman, Alexis Taylor. The group's name is Fainting by Numbers and a double side single has been produced.

His Track "Timecode" from 2004 is inspired by the song "How Long" (Lipps Inc./1980).

He covered the song "So Weit Wie Noch Nie" by Jürgen Paape.

== Personal life ==
Köhncke is gay.

== Discography ==
=== Albums ===
- Spiralen Der Erinnerung (1999)
- Was Ist Musik (2002)
- Doppelleben (2005)
- Safe and Sound (2008)
- Bass ist Musik (2013)
- Justus Köhncke & The Wonderful Frequency Band (2013)
