= Superpitcher =

- Born: Aksel Schaufler
- Origin: Germany
- Genres: Electronic; Indie electronic Microhouse; Experimental techno
- Occupations: DJ, Producer
- Years active: 2000–present
- Labels: Kompakt

Aksel Schaufler better known by his stage name Superpitcher, is a German producer affiliated with Cologne's Kompakt music label.

== Background ==
Superpitcher made his first appearance on Kompakt's Total 2 compilation album in 2000 with the song "Shadows". In 2001, he contributed a track to Kompakt's first Speicher 12" and released Heroin, a three-track 12" with three different sounds; "Tomorrow" was later included on that year's Total 3. On 2002's Total 4 there was another track by Schaufler, an electropop cover of Brian Eno's "Baby's on Fire". Soon after that, Schaufler released his second 12", Yesterday, which featured re-workings of the songs "Tomorrow" and "Heroin". He also made another appearance that year on Kompakt's fourth Speicher 12".

Since stepping out, Schaufler has done steady remixing work for the likes of Dntel, Carsten Jost and several others. In early 2004, Superpitcher released Here Comes Love. A year later, he released a mix album for Kompakt called Today.

Superpitcher and Michael Mayer have collaborated under the pseudonym Supermayer. Their debut album, Save The World, was released on September the 17th 2007 in Europe and September the 25th in the USA. The duo performed under the pseudonym at the 2008 Festival Internacional de Benicàssim and at Copenhagen Distortion in 2009 and 2011.

Superpitcher, together with Rebolledo, is also part of the duo the Pachanga Boys and tours extensively.

== Discography ==
=== Albums ===
- Here Comes Love (2004)
- Today Mix CD (2005)
- Kilimanjaro (2010)
- So Far So Super (2016)
- The Golden Ravedays (2017)

=== Singles ===
- Softmachine / Let's Cruise (1999)
- Grounded / Dubbin' In A Smoky Room (as Sir Positive)
- Pure Luck (as Sir Positive) (2003)
- Heroin (2001)
- Yesterday (2002)
- Happiness (2004)
- Baby's on Fire (2004)
- Say I'm Your Number One (2008)

=== Remixes ===
- Phantom/Ghost – Nothing is written
- Tocotronic – Hi Freaks
- Carsten Jost – Krokus
- Lullabies In The Dark – Iridium
- Along The Wire – Lawrence
- The Dream of Evan and Chan – Dntel
