= Michael Mayer (musician) =

German musician (born 1971)

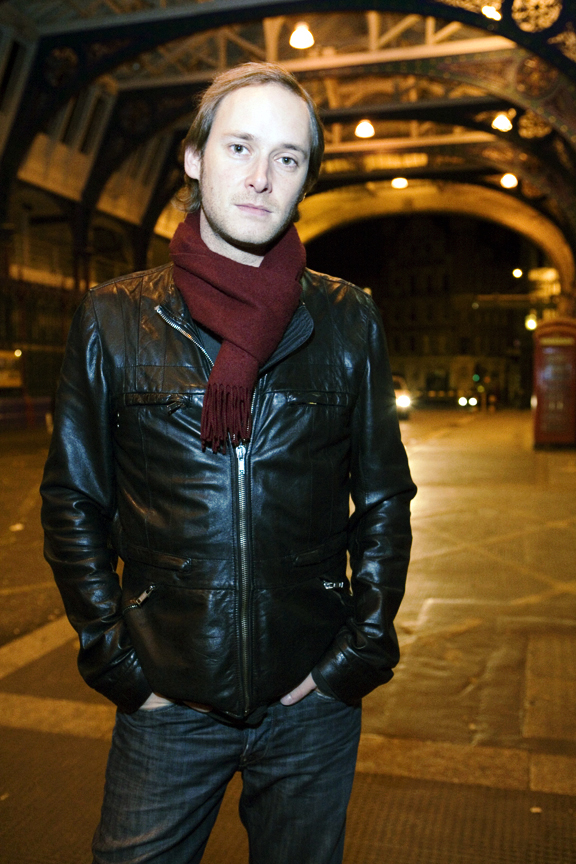
- Mayer in 2006

Background information
- Born: 11 December 1971 (age 53); Black Forest, Germany
- Genres: Electronic, microhouse, experimental techno, ambient techno
- Occupation(s): Producer, remixer
- Years active: 1997–present
- Labels: Kompakt, New Trance Atlantic, Kreisel 99

Michael Mayer (born 11 December 1971) is an electronic musician from Cologne, Germany. Mayer is a remixer, DJ and producer, and has released several singles on the Kompakt music label, working with founder Wolfgang Voigt. Mayer has also released music on Kompakt-related labels New Trance Atlantic and Kreisel 99.

== Biography ==
Mayer was born and raised in Black Forest, Germany. At the age of 20, he moved to Cologne. With the help of Wolfgang and Reinhardt Voigt, he established Kompakt.

In 2003, he released a pair of mixes. The first was based on several releases in Kompakt's "Speicher" series, while the second was commissioned by London's Fabric series. The following year, Mayer released a second Speicher mix and finally delivered his long-promised debut album of productions.

== Discography ==
=== Albums ===
- Neuhouse (1998)
- Immer (2002)
- Speicher CD1 (2003)
- Fabric 13 (2003)
- Speicher CD2 (2004)
- Touch (2004)
- Immer 2 (2006)
- Speicher CD3 (2007)
- Save the World (2007)
- Immer 3 (2010)
- Mantasy (2012)
- & (2016)
- DJ-Kicks (2017)
- Higher (2020)
- Connecting the Dots (2021)
- The Floor Is Lava (2024)

=== Remixes ===
- Agoria – "Sky Is Clear"
- Miss Kittin – "Happy Violentine"
- Depeche Mode – "Precious"
- Pet Shop Boys – "Flamboyant"
- Thylacine – "Train"
