= Microhouse =

Subgenre of house music

- Stylistic origins: Minimal techno; house; bitpop; glitch; minimalism; IDM; Chicago house; acid house
- Cultural origins: Late 1990s, Europe

Regional scenes
- Frankfurt; Cologne; Montreal; Paris; Barcelona (DC10); Melbourne; Romania

Other topics
- Lounges; Nightclubs

Microhouse, buftech or sometimes just minimal, is a subgenre of house music strongly influenced by minimalism and 1990s techno.

== History ==
Microhouse has its roots in the minimal techno, bitpop (both developed in the early 1990s), and house (developed in the early 1980s) genres of music. Its first echoes appeared in a glitch album by German experimental artist Oval, in 1993. Like many contemporary electronic genres, Microhouse has many influences, most notably techno and the "click and pop" garage house that has emerged from Yorkshire Bleeps and Bass (or "Bleep"), bitpop and minimal techno. Contrasting with tech house, which is often thought of as 'house music with elements of techno in its arrangement and instrumentation', microhouse is more aptly described as 'housey minimal techno' – a marriage of the funky and groovy backroom house elements with bitpop and the driving, repetitive sound of techno. Emphasis tended to fall on cushiony kick-drum thumps and the accompanying hi-hats, with faint textures provided by synthetic strings and dreamy keyboard tones.

Full-fledged microhouse artists start appearing in the late-90's to early-00's such as German producer Jan Jelinek. His contributions are notable in the genre considering works like "textstar+" (as Farben) and "Loop-finding-jazz-records". Both works have amassed cult status and widespread acclaim with its distinctive microhouse sound. Microhouse has continued on in the late 2010s-20's with electronic artists like Jon Hopkins, The Field, Pantha du Prince, Rival Consoles, Matthew Herbert, Actress, Four Tet, Isolée, and many others. "Vocalcity" by Luomo is a hallmark album in microhouse and has been credited as one of the main works that helped popularize the genre.

Throughout the late ‘90s and early 2000s, several small labels thriving on this approach cropped up. A fair percentage of the output from already-established labels like Playhouse (Isolée, Losoul), Kompakt (Sascha Funke, M. Mayer) and Klang Elektronik (Farben) made for some of microhouse’s most thrilling moments. Other labels — such as Force Tracks (Luomo, MRI), Perlon (Ricardo Villalobos, Pantytec) and Trapez (Akufen, M.I.A.) — were virtually all-microhouse in scope.

=== Coinage ===
The term microhouse was coined by music journalist and DJ Philip Sherburne in a July 2001 article for the magazine The Wire. Dave Stelfox wrote in Hyperdub that the term described "the spectral, hypnotic interpretation of classic Chicago grooves emerging on labels such as Perlon, Kompakt, Playhouse, Ongaku, Klang Elektronik and the Mille Plateaux family of imprints-most notably Force Tracks and Force Inc- at the turn of the millennium."

Sherburne recalled how listening to Perlon's Superlongevity compilation in 1999, he "had the strong impression that House had been stripped down to a trifold essence: rhythm, soul and silence." For Sherburne, this was "not so much House as 'MicroHouse'," capturing "not only the proportions of the music, but also its semi-underground status, positioned at odds with more traditional Deep House, to say nothing of the genre's even more mainstream, megaclub fare." He traced the sound's reductionism to "Chain Reaction's blissed out minimalism," and its "punchier and groovier" qualities to "Matthew Herbert's clipped, cushioned romps, and the minimalist Chicago disco pioneered by the likes of Moodymann and Theo Parrish." He traced further antecedents in "the catalogues of German labels like Klang Elektronik, Playhouse and subsequently Force Tracks".

== Characteristics ==
Like house and techno, microhouse is built around a 4/4 time signature. Its tempo ranges between 115 and 130 BPM. A noticeable difference between microhouse and house is the replacement of typical house kick drums, hi-hats and other drum machine samples with clicks, static, glitches, and small bits of noise, which more often than not are stretched out and last longer in drops. Microhouse artists often experiment with different forms of sampling to achieve this effect.

One characteristic feature of microhouse is the use of sampling: extremely short ('micro') samples of the human voice, musical instruments, everyday noises and computer created wave patterns are arranged to form complex melodies (such as can be heard in Akufen's "Deck the House"). Vocals in microhouse are often simplistic, nonsensical, and monotone in nature, although some artists, such as Matthew Dear, combine singing with microhouse production. This is one of the main characteristics of microhouse compared to deep house, for example, which tends to feature no vocals and also a slower tempo going to as low as 115 BPM in some songs.

Microhouse is somewhat obscure when compared to other genres of house and techno, but several cities including Bucharest, Melbourne, Berlin, London, Paris, Montreal, the San Francisco Bay Area, Seattle, Miami, Detroit, and Chicago, have budding scenes, and with the minimal techno boom of the mid-2000s, is now gaining great popularity in German, French, Canadian, Italian and Spanish clubs. Mainstream tech house records and CDs will occasionally have microhouse or minimal reworks of tracks. On top of this, several tracks have become major club hits over the years, and a few others have even gained European radioplay.

The following labels generally release minimal techno, deep house or other genres but also release microhouse:

- Playhouse
- BPitch Control
- Cadenza
- Cocoon
- Ghostly International / Spectral Sound
- Kompakt
- Macro
- Mille Plateaux
- M nus
- Traum Schallplatten
- Truesoul
- Raster-Noton
