= Thomas Fehlmann =

Swiss composer and music producer

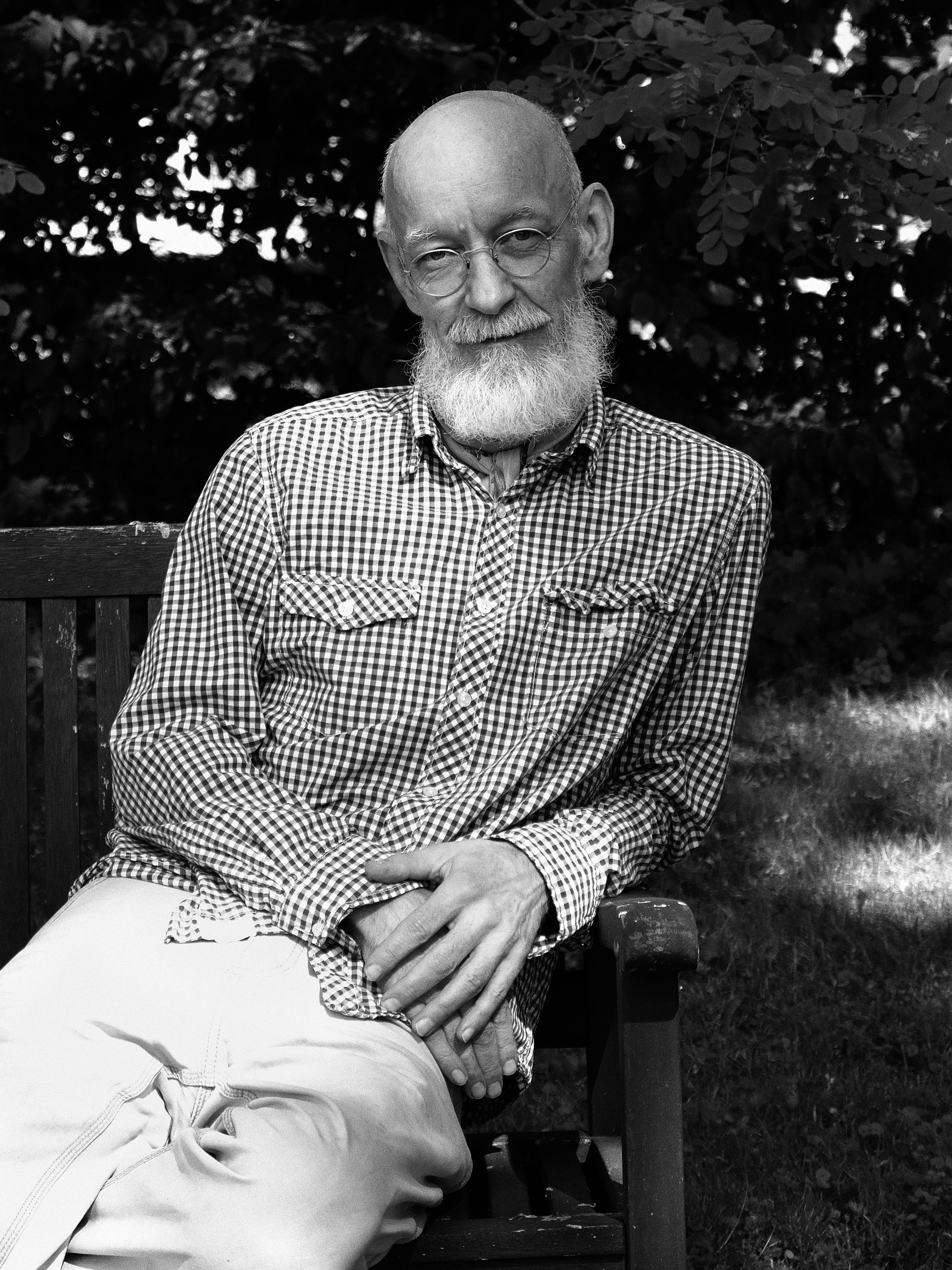
- Fehlmann in 2020

Background information
- Born: 1957 (age 68–69); Zürich, Switzerland
- Genre: Electronic dance music (EDM)
- Occupations: Composer, producer
- Instruments: Keyboards, turntables, sampler
- Website: http://www.theorb.com/

Thomas Fehlmann (born 1957) is a Swiss composer and producer who lives in Berlin, Germany, and has been active in electronic music since the 1980s. He is currently active on the Kompakt record label based in Germany. Fehlmann is an on-and-off member of the Orb.

Notable releases include Visions of Blah on the Kompakt label, the Orb's 2004 Bicycles and Tricycles, and 2010's Gute Luft album soundtrack to the TV documentary 24h Berlin. His 2007 album Honigpumpe was rated 8.6 on the Pitchfork music review site. In 2018, Fehlmann released three albums: A collaborative effort with Terrence Dixon titled We Take It from Here as well as two solo albums, Los Lagos and the documentary soundtrack 1929 - Das Jahr Babylon.

== See also ==
- Palais Schaumburg: Fehlmann was a founding member of this Neue Deutsche Welle group.
