= Looping State of Mind =

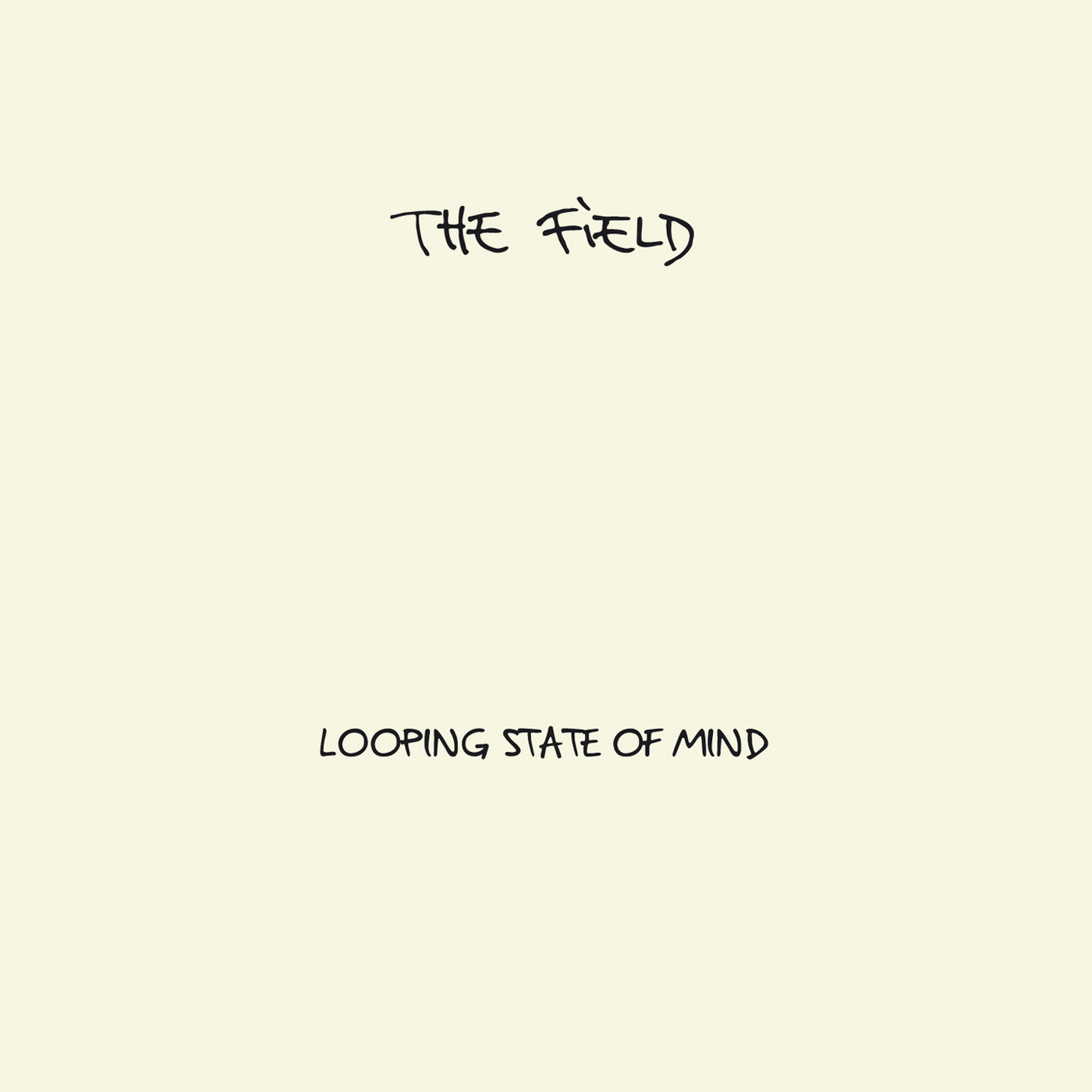

Studio album by the Field
- Released: 5 September 2011
- Recorded: 2011
- Studios: Willner's House (Berlin); Dumbo (Cologne)
- Genres: Ambient techno; minimal techno
- Length: 64:02
- Label: Kompakt
- Producer: Axel Willner

The Field chronology
Yesterday and Today (2009)	Looping State of Mind (2011)	Cupid's Head (2013)

Looping State of Mind is the third studio album by Swedish electronic music producer Axel Willner, under his alias the Field, released digitally on 5 September 2011 by Kompakt. The production stemmed from the use of guest musicians for Willner's previous album as the Field, Yesterday and Today (2009), and his use of live instrumentation in a music tour. The songs in Looping State of Mind were produced at Dumbo Studios, Cologne, where live instrumentation, performed by Dan Enquvist and Jesper Skarin, were added to demos composed by Willner. It is an ambient and minimal techno album that develops upon the Field's previously established music style. Each song is formed by musical loops that are layered and evolve over time, creating immersive and intricate songs.

"Then It's White" was posted on SoundCloud the same day as the digital release of Looping State of Mind, which was released physically on 10 October 2011. A promotional tour ran throughout North America and Europe from October–December 2011. The album received critical acclaim for its composition and development of the Field's style and was listed on several year-end lists. A remix EP based on it was released on 30 July 2012.

== Background and production ==
Looping State of Mind is Axel Willner's third album to be produced under his alias of the Field, after the well-received albums From Here We Go Sublime (2007) and Yesterday and Today (2009). Yesterday and Today featured several guest musicians such as drummer John Stanier from Battles. Though the album was less well-received than From Here We Go Sublime, it encouraged Willner to go on tour with bassist Dan Enquvist and drummer Jesper Skarin, which culminated in the production of Looping State of Mind.

Looping State of Mind was Willner's first album to be produced in an official studio; his previous albums had been made at his home in Berlin. The album was produced in Dumbo Studios, Cologne, over the course of four days in 2011. For most of the songs, Willner composed demos out of microsamples at his home in Berlin before taking them to Dumbo Studios. These demos intentionally left elements out of the song in anticipation for the sessions. A few of the tracks had productions that differed from this routine: "Then It's White" was created entirely during a jam session at Dumbo Studios, and Willner composed "Arpeggiated Love" after the sessions had already ended. Willner worked in post-production after the sessions concluded.

== Composition ==
"The Field - Then It's White"
"Then It's White" was the only song to be entirely produced within Dumbo Studios through live instrumentation. Similarly to the rest of Looping State of Mind, "Then It's White" introduces and develops upon looped musical elements, such as the piano melody, over course of the song's run.

Looping State of Mind is an ambient techno and minimal techno album. Noel Gardner of NME described the songs as "blissful, loop-based hymns at the intersection between shoegazing, trance and minimal techno". Looping State of Mind develops upon the Fields's established musical style through live instrumentation, complex development, and varied rhythms. Each song is composed of looped musical elements such as basslines, drums, and vocal samples. As each song progresses, these loops develop and evolve, and they are layered upon by additional loops, creating immersive and intricate songs.

The opener, "Is This Power", combines a deep bassline with a pulsing drumbeat and synths, building into a "trance-like sense of bliss". A breakdown eventually interrupts these loops and "makes way for patterns of black diamond gleam". "It's Up There" is reminiscent of Willner's earlier work. It starts with an "arousing Seefeel-esque loop" and develops into an uplifting dance song. A notable element of "It's Up There" is its funky bassline. "Burned Out" is constructed from an R&B guitar loop and ambient melodies that establish the bittersweet tone before the introduction of an indistinct, distorted voice.

"Arpeggiated Love", also reminiscent of Willner's previous work, consists of laid-back synth grooves and a disembodied vocal sample that asks, "Are you gay?" "Looping State of Mind" is built off of a "throbbing sonorous bass loop and a tropical dance pattern" that take the form of "various melancholic but richly uplifting ambient melodies [that] take turns directing its emotional tone". "Then It's White" is a "lullaby-esque song" and a piano ballad that combines classical music with the Field's distinct ambient sound. The song's foundation is an ornate piano melody that is gradually developed by synths and echoing vocals over a subtle beat. The song is emotional, described by Josh Hall of The Line of Best Fit as "lugubrious, melancholic yet optimistic", and progresses "hypnotically and methodically". The "strangely emotive" closer, "Sweet Slow Baby", features stuttering beats.

== Release and promotion ==
Willner announced the release of Looping State of Mind in August 2011. Willner said that the title "comes from the feeling of having looping thoughts—both good and bad—in your head, and being unable to get them out. But then, of course, my music is based around loops and repetition too." The album's release date was planned to be 25 October 2011. In September 2011, the planned release date was changed to 10 October.

Looping State of Mind was released for digital download on 5 September 2011. The track "Then It's White" was released the same day on Kompakt's SoundCloud account, leading to Willner to enter Hype Machine's most blogged artists chart that week. Kompakt released Looping State of Mind physically on 10 October 2011. Willner toured throughout North America and Europe from October–December 2011 to promote the album. A remix EP version was released by Kompakt on 30 July 2012. The EP consists of three songs: a Junior Boys remix of "Looping State of Mind", a Blondes remix of "It's Up There", and a Mohn (Note: Mohn is a duo consisting of Jörg Burger and Wolfgang Voigt.) remix of "Then It's White".

== Reception ==
Professional ratings
Aggregate scores
Source	Rating
AnyDecentMusic?	7.4/10
Metacritic	83/100
Review scores
Source	Rating
AllMusic	4.5/5 stars
The A.V. Club	A−
Drowned in Sound	9/10
NME	8/10
Pitchfork	8.5/10
PopMatters	9/10
Q	4/5 stars
Resident Advisor	4.0/5
Spin	8/10
Uncut	4/5 stars

Looping State of Mind has received critical acclaim; it received a score of 83 by the review aggregator website Metacritic, indicating "universal acclaim". Metacritic listed Looping State of Mind as the 17th best-reviewed album of 2011 with over fifteen reviews, stating that Willner's quality as the Field has remained consistent and that critics "admired his considerable composition skills" on the album. Jess Harvell of Pitchfork called Looping State of Mind "Willner’s masterpiece-to-date", and Resident Advisor's Derek Miller considered the album "Willner's most diverse and satisfying statement to date...an album that establishes him as one of electronic music's more subtly lateral thinkers." Alex Young of Consequence declared that Looping State of Mind is well-constructed, beautifully ambitious, and a "refreshing return without any unnecessary sheen and gloss – minimalism that moves".

Critics lauded the composition and songwriting behind Looping State of Mind. Many critics found the composition to be hypnotic and immersive due to its textured subtlety and repetitive nature. (Note: Attributed to multiple references:) Mike Newmark of PopMatters explained, "Willner understands...that...loops must develop to remain engaging." Newmark states that this is recognized in Looping State of Mind, citing the gradually developing melodies and volume. Multiple critics also praised Willner for developing and improving upon his musical style for the album, especially in light of Yesterday and Today, which had a relatively disappointing reception. (Note: Attributed to multiple references:) Beats Per Minute's Alex Young opined that "here he has never sounded more confident and purposeful". Tiny Mix Tapes's Art Ivan stated that Looping State of Mind could be redemptive for Willner after Yesterday and Today and that the profound nature of the album showcases "not only that he has successfully moved past the confines of his early work, but also that he’s presently at the top of his game".

=== Accolades ===
Looping State of Mind has appeared on several year-end lists. For example, it was ranked as number 17 by XLR8R and number 19 by Drowned in Sound. Pitchfork ranked Looping State of Mind as the 26th-best album and "Then It's White" as the 31st-best track of 2011. In 2013, Beats Per Minute ranked Looping State of Mind on "The Top 130 Albums" at number 87. Future Music listed Looping State of Mind as among the best electronic albums.

Year-end lists for Looping State of Mind
Publication	List	Rank	Ref.
Beats Per Minute	The Top 50 Albums of 2011	42	
Drowned in Sound	DiS' Favourite Albums of 2011	19	
Mixmag	Albums of the Year	33	
NME	NME's best albums and tracks of 2011	28	
Pitchfork	The Top 50 Albums of 2011	26	
PopMatters	The 75 Best Albums of 2011	70	
Spin	Spin's 50 Best Albums of 2011	37	
XLR8R	XLR8R's Best of 2011	17	

== Track listing ==
All tracks are written by Axel Willner.

Looping State of Mind track listing
No.	Title	Length
1.	"Is This Power"	8:39
2.	"It's Up There"	9:19
3.	"Burned Out"	7:33
4.	"Arpeggiated Love"	10:52
5.	"Looping State of Mind"	10:31
6.	"Then It's White"	7:52
7.	"Sweet Slow Baby"	9:16
Total length:		64:02

== Personnel ==
Credits adapted from Looping State of Mind CD liner notes.

- Axel Willner – writing and production, audio engineering, Elektron Octatrack, Elektron Machinedrum, "buzz programming", Roland SH-101, Roland JX-3P, Yamaha CS-01, bass, electric baritone guitar, ebow, drums
- Dan Enquvist – bass, electric baritone guitar, Yamaha CS-01, piano
- Jesper Skarin – drums, double bass, vibraphone, piano
- Kicki Halmos – vocals (7)
- Jan Philipp Janzen – "soft synth" (6), audio engineering
- Jörg Burger – audio mastering
- Sonia Alvarez – photography

== Charts ==
Chart performance for Looping State of Mind
Chart (2011)	Peak position
US Heatseekers Albums (Billboard)	20
US Top Dance/Electronic Albums (Billboard)	10
