= Cupid's Head =

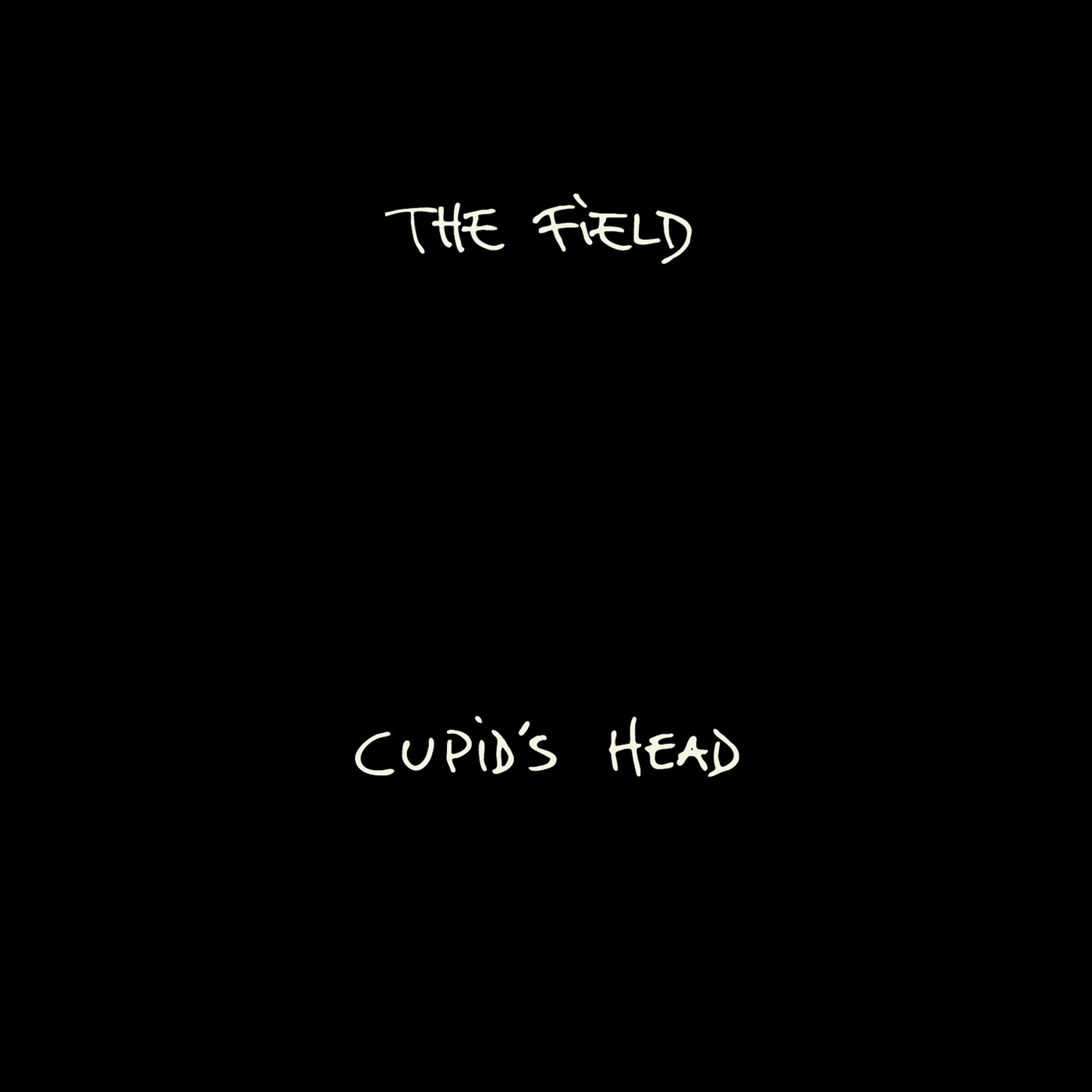

Studio album by The Field
- Released: 30 September 2013
- Genre: Techno
- Length: 53:59
- Label: Kompakt
- Producer: Axel Willner

The Field chronology
| Looping State of Mind (2011) | Cupid's Head (2013) | The Follower (2016) |

Cupid's Head is the fourth studio album by Swedish electronic music producer Axel Willner under his alias The Field, released by Kompakt on 30 September 2013. Unlike previous albums Yesterday and Today and Looping State of Mind, the album was recorded exclusively on hardware by Willner himself, featuring only one additional musician on the track "No. No..." It was noted by critics a having a darker, more intense tone than previous The Field releases, while maintaining a similar minimal techno style. At just under 54 minutes, it is the shortest The Field album. Upon release, it received generally positive reviews from critics for expanding upon the established aesthetic of previous albums. A ten-track remix album was released on 20 January, 2014.

== Background and Production ==
After having recorded together with live musicians on 2009’s Yesterday and Today and 2011’s Looping State of Mind, Wilner returned to working alone both in live shows and in the studio as he had done on his 2007 debut From Here We Go Sublime. According to Wilner, this was at first due to a prolonged creative block he suffered at the beginning of the production process due to burnout from touring. When he finally did find inspiration, the songs “all just came” and he felt that no additional personnel was needed to fully develop them. Wilner wanted to achieve a “raw, and not too polished” aesthetic similar to his debut album, which he thought would not have been possible with a long recording and post-production process.

Instead of using the digital audio workstation Jeskola Buzz as he had on the previous album, an Electron Ocatrack was used for samples, which according to Willner had a major impact on the sound of the album. Other gear used to product the album include an Elektron Machinedrum, Elektron Analog4, Roland SH-101, and Roland JX-3P. Wilner also played bass for the album. Kicki Holmes from the Swedish band Masquer provided the vocals for “No. No…”, which was the first track Wilner composed for the album and the source of the inspiration that ended his creative block.

== Composition and Style ==
Cupid’s Head continues the loop-based minimal techno style of Willner’s previous albums released as The Field. Like on Looping State of Mind, the tracks are based on looping samples, with Willner emphasizing the loops as central to each composition. At 53 minutes, Cupid’s Head is the shortest out of all of The Field’s albums, composed of fewer but longer tracks than the previous albums. Unlike Looping State of Mind which was composed almost entirely in a digital audio workstation, Wilner produced the entire album using hardware.

Multiple reviewers described the mood of the album as “darker” than The Field’s previous releases. Compared with the previous album, Larry Fitzmaurice of Pitchfork called it a “moodier work, perfectly balancing sleekness and aggression,” describing the album as more “intense” than previous works. Alex Keller of AllMusic described the music as “trance-y techno informed by dream pop and dub.” Mike Powell of Rolling Stone described it as “rougher, working wrinkles and jagged edges into music that used to feel almost too smooth to grab on to.”

== Release and Promotion ==
Willner announced Cupid’s Head on 31 July, 2013. was released on 30 September, 2013. When asked in an interview about the title, Willner said that, "the album is about visions of the future, tiny actions vs. consequences, love… and Cupid has a lot to do with that." Featuring liner note photgraphy by Sonia Alvarez, it is the first of three The Field albums to feature a black background after three cream-colored album covers, which was noted by critics as reflecting the darker tone of the album. The album retains the same layout as the previous three, with "The Field" written in handwriting at the top and the album's title at the bottom. The digital release features white text on a black background, while the CD and vinyl releases have black text on a dark grey background.

Cupid' s Head was released on 30 September, 2013. A few days prior, Kompakt made it available to stream via Soundcloud on 26 September. To promote the album, Willner played a few solo concerts in Europe following the release of the album. On 20 January 2014, Kompakt released an EP of 10 remixes of tracks from the album, featuring remixes by Tim Hecker, Vatican Shadow, John Tejada, TM404, and Gas.

Professional ratings
Aggregate scores
| Source | Rating |
|---|---|
| AnyDecentMusic? | 7.7/10 |
| Metacritic | 80/100 |
Review scores
| Source | Rating |
| AllMusic | 3/5 stars |
| Consequence of Sound | 4/5 stars |
| Exclaim! | 8/10 |
| Fact | 3.5/5 |
| Mojo | 4/5 stars |
| Pitchfork | 8.7/10 |
| PopMatters | 8/10 |
| Resident Advisor | 4.0/5 |
| Rolling Stone | 3.5/5 stars |
| Uncut | 8/10 |

== Critical reception ==
Upon its release, Cupid’s Head received critical acclaim; it received a score of 80 by the review aggregator website Metacritic, indicating "generally favorable reviews". Pitchfork called it, "a dark, exquisitely detailed album that rewards patience and further cements the Field's reputation as one of modern electronic music's most satisfying auteurs." Resident Advisor wrote that it was, "yet another transcendent album by The Field," and Consequence of Sound called it, "a sentimental, succinct collection of independent tracks, all of which are raw, honest, and scrumptiously concocted."

Some reviewers had a more mixed assessment, such as Andy Kellman of AllMusic who argued that some tracks "lack vitality" and that "those who are less enamored won't hear enough that distinguishes it from any other Field album." Steve Shaw of Fact magazine found that the overall concept of the album only "half works," criticizing some aspects of "They Won't See Me" and "20 Seconds of Affection" but praising how Willner's new direction manifests on "Black Sea."

At the end of the year, Stereogum named Cupid's Head the 33rd best album of 2013, and Rolling Stone named it the 7th best dance album of the year.

== Track listing ==
All tracks are written by Axel Willner.

| No. | Title | Length |
|---|---|---|
| 1. | "They Won't See Me" | 8:59 |
| 2. | "Black Sea" | 11:35 |
| 3. | "Cupid's Head" | 6:32 |
| 4. | "A Guided Tour" | 8:14 |
| 5. | "No. No..." | 9:00 |
| 6. | "20 Seconds of Affection" | 9:39 |
| Total length: | | 53:59 |

== Personnel ==
Adapted from the Cupid' s Head liner notes.

- Axel Willner – Electron Octatrack, Electron Machinedrum, Electron Analog4, Roland SH-101, Roland JX-3P, Bass
- The Field – writing and production
- Kicki Halmos – vocals on "No. No..."
- Sonia Alvarez – photography
- Jörg Burger – audio mastering

== Charts ==
| Chart (2013) | Peak position |
|---|---|
| Belgian Albums (Ultratop Flanders) | 154 |
| UK Albums (Official Charts) | 151 |
| UK Dance Albums (Official Charts) | 24 |
| UK Independent Albums (Official Charts) | 42 |
| US Heatseekers Albums (Billboard) | 8 |
| US Top Dance Albums (Billboard) | 8 |
