= 4GB Music Festival =

Electronic music festival in Georgia

4GB
- Genre: Electronic music
- Locations: Saguramo, Georgia
- Years active: 2011–present
- Website: www.4gb.ge

4GB is an annual international electronic music festival held in Georgia since 2011. It is dedicated to the memory of one of Georgian pioneer DJs, Gio Bakanidze. Since the very first year it has been headlined by Bakanidze's favourite musician, Michael Mayer.

== Awards ==
In 2013–2017 years, for 5 times in a row, 4GB was awarded the title of year's best festival by Electronauts annual award.

== Lineups ==
Year	Date	Acts	Location	ticket price
2011		Nika j, Vaxo, Abo, Tomma, Chipo, Michael Mayer.	Railway house	
2012		Abo, Nika J, Tomma, Superpitcher, Michael Mayer.	Georgian National Broadcaster Pavilion	
2013		Kancheli, Gio Shengelia, Radioslave, Vakho, Luka Nakashidze, Greenbeam & Leon, Bacho Chaladze, Third Soul, BMI, Kozman, Newa, Zurkin, Bero, Gabunia, MAMM, Ericsson, Tomma, Nika J, Michael Mayer.	Club Underwheel	
2014	9–11 May	Owler, MAMM, Gabunia, Newa, Ash, Third Soul, Sikha & Lasha, Bero, Tomma, COMA PACHANGA BOYS, Gio Shengelia, Bacho & Cobert, Kancheli, Vincent Volt, Ex!t, Luna Nine, Kid Jesus, Rotkraft, FOOTPRINTZ, Vaxo & Zurkin, Matias Aguayo, Jorjick, Autumn Tree, Andro, Ericsson, Nika J, Michael Mayer.	Club Underwheel	12$
2015	8–10 May	Philipp Gorbachev, Nika J, Zurkin & Vakho, Weval, Tim Sweeney, Sascha Funke, Gio Shengelia, Jonathan Kaspar, Tomma, Bero, Ericsson, Third Soul, Low Sea, Long Arm, Akufen, Dave Aju, Stewart Walker, Tobias Thomas, The Modernist, Reinhard Voigt, AOKI takamasa, Michael Mayer.	Georgian Film 4th and 5th Pavilion	10-35$
2016	6–8 May	Third Soul, Ash, Bacho, Barnt, Basic Soul Unit, Bero Cobert, Cosmin TRG, Ericsson, Gacha, Gio Shengelia, greenbeam & Leon, KiNK, Kӣr, Lakuti, Lawrence, Luke Slater, Matthew Herbert, Michael Mayer, NDRX, Nika J, Prins Thomas, Reinhard Voigt, Rezo Glonti Sebastian Mullaert, Tama Sumo, Tobias Thomas, Tomma, Ulf Eriksson, Vakho, Vincent Volt, Zurkin Jan Nemecek, Jeff Mills, Jonathan Kaspar, Kancheli, Michael Mayer.	Elmavalmshenebeli, Tbilisi	15$+
2017	11–13 May; 21 May.	Octachoron, The Orb, Moritz von Oswald, Shed, DJ Deep Zeinkali, Young Marco, Gerd Janson, Shining, TM & Mush One ft. I.G.O., Kazzy Jazz & Jeronimo, Giorgi Zurabishvili & MC Cutkill Patrice Baumel, Jonathan Kaspar, Pino, Third Soul, Optimo, Ericsson, Mathew Jonson, Carl Craig, Marcel Fengler, Zitto, Bero, Mulholland Free Clinic, Sevda, Move D, Gio Shengelia, Autumn Tree, Hamatsuki, Bacho, Cobert, Reinhard Voigt, T. Raumschmiere, Acid Pauli, Rati, Vakho & Zurkin, Hunee & Motor City Drum Ensemble, Nika J, The Field, Tomma, Vincent Lemieux, Dandy Jack, San Proper, Ricardo Villalobos, Michael Mayer.	Former Institute of Space Structures in Saguramo	60$
2018	18–19 May; 25–26 May.	Third Soul, Alex From Tokyo, Amir Javasoul, Ash Scholem, Bacho, Boston 168, Boyd Schidt, B2B, Zitto, DJ Deep, DJ Koze, Edward, Gio Shengelia, Hamatsuki, JD J, Legowelt, Nika J, Ricardo Villalobos, Robag Wruhme, Shlømo, Scuba, Sumo, The Hacker, Tobias., Tomma, Vakho, Zurkin.	Former Institute of Space Structures in Saguramo	75€
2019	17–18 May; 24–25 May.	Nika J, Seth Troxler, Larry Heard aka Mr. Fingers feat. Paul Cut (Live), Prosumer, Map.Ache (Live), Andrius, Tade, Christian S, Cobert (Live), Bacho, Moku J, Jeronimo, TM & Mush One, I.G.O, Deka & MC Cutkill, Claudia Anderson, LvvvO (Live), DJ Bone, Sleeparchive (Live), Peter van Hoesen, Kancheli B2B Ndrx, Lovefingers, Danielle Baldelli, 3rd Soul, Ericsson, Vakho, Zurkin, DJ Normal 4 x Bufiman (Live), Hunee, Chica Paula, Tomma B2B Gio Shengelia, Edward, Sonja Moonear, Strobocop, James Dean Brown, BMI, Lilith, Sikha, Cosmic Love Rotation, Sumo B2B Khvedeliani, Curious Paul, Cosmo Vitelli, Ivan Smagghe, JD J B2B Ani, Misho Urushadze a.k.a. Shinning, Chester, Terika, DJ Grotask, Crusher, Jorjick, Dave Clarke, Zitto, Special Request, Greenbeam & Leon, Bratenschneider, Ika, Sedef Adasi, Marvin & Guy, Jonathan Kaspar, Bero, Uru, Ninasupsa, Khidja, Interstellar Funk, Nicole, Generali Minerali (Live), Dima Dadiani (Live), Robag Wruhme, Roman Flügel, Reinhard Voigt (Live), Michael Mayer, Kvanchi, Spacejam 92 (Live), Hamatsuki (Live), Toke (Live), Sevda (Live), HVL (Live), V.C.V.S (Live), Ash, Luke Vibert, Gacha, L8, Vasil, Rati, Gabunia, Acid Paul.	Former Institute of Space Structures in Saguramo	75€
2023	26-28 May	Ash, Gacha, Ninasupsa, Zoe Mc Pherson, Cobert, Moku J, Moku T, Dima Dadiani, Tade, Neil Landstrumm, Cozy K, Electric Indigo, Jeronimo, Mano Le Tough, MC Cutkill, Mush One, Jensen Interceptor, Merve, DeKa, Bero, Bluetoof, Ani Kvirkvelia, Djrum, Tedi, Bad Habitz, Gio Shengelia, Kdema, Process, Postalion, Edward, Rati, Komma, Karine, Skazz, Tsomi, Liza Rivs, 4D Monster Lobsters, Killages, Tomma, Hatsvali, Hudson, LOUDspeakers, Young Georgian Lolitaz, St joseph, Dagdagani, Jorjick, Tamada, Khvedeliani, Mishulino, Yanamaste, Lucas Benjamin, Prins Thomas, The Juan Maclean, Ndrx, Jazz Spastiks, Greenbeam & Leon, Skatebård, 3rd Soul, Kancheli, Ryogyry, Ericsson, Othr, Roxtone, NEWA, G.Kura, HVL, Toke, Zitto, Audiospace, Generali Minerali, Kraumur, Kvanchi, Yves, IKA, Pastorius X, Rydeen, Parna, Pasha, Sandro Jorbenadze, Esi, Saphileaum, Bacho, BMI, Todd Terje, JD J, Kozmana, Mova, Vakho, Kote Japaridze, Nika J, Budino, GiGi, Rene, T. Raumschmiere, Jonathan Kaspar, Digital Groove Affair, Zurkin, Reinhard Voigt, Michael Mayer	Former Institute of Space Structures in Saguramo	75€
2025	16 May	Michael Mayer	Radio City	35€
