= The Follower (album) =

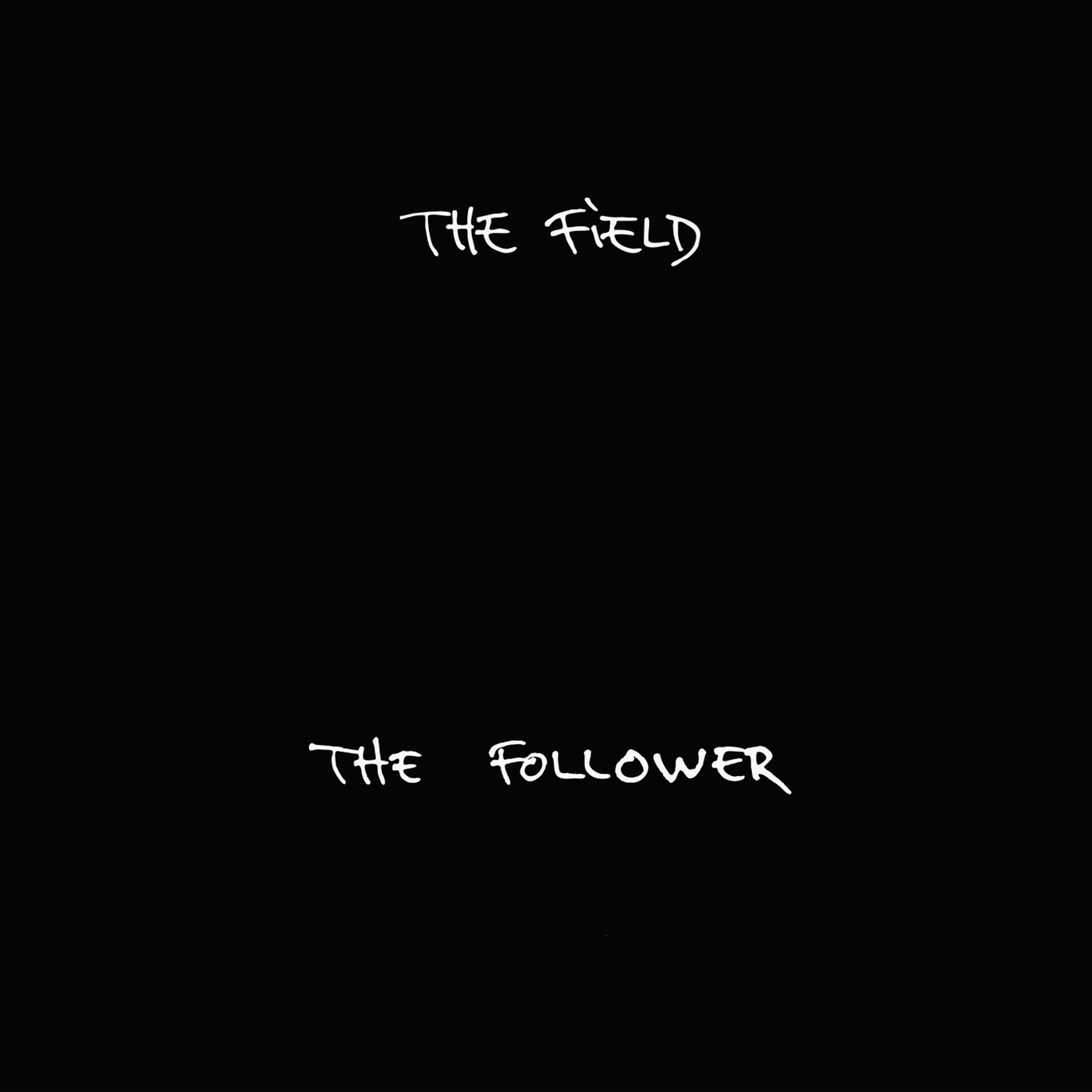

Studio album by The Field
- Released: 1 April 2016
- Genre: Techno
- Length: 65:40
- Label: Kompakt
- Producer: Axel Willner

The Field chronology
Cupid's Head (2013)	The Follower (2016)	Infinite Moment (2018)

Professional ratings
Aggregate scores
Source	Rating
AnyDecentMusic?	7.3/10
Metacritic	78/100
Review scores
Source	Rating
AllMusic	3.5/5 stars
Drowned in Sound	6/10
Exclaim!	8/10
The Irish Times	3/5 stars
Mojo	4/5 stars
Pitchfork	7.9/10
PopMatters	8/10
Resident Advisor	3.8/5
Spin	8/10
Uncut	7/10

The Follower is the fifth studio album by Swedish electronic music producer Axel Willner under his alias The Field. It was released by Kompakt on 1 April 2016.

== Track listing ==
All tracks are written by Axel Willner.

No.	Title	Length
1.	"The Follower"	9:56
2.	"Pink Sun"	8:56
3.	"Monte Verità"	10:34
4.	"Soft Streams"	10:51
5.	"Raise the Dead"	11:18
6.	"Reflecting Lights"	14:05
Total length:		65:40

== Charts ==
Chart (2016)	Peak position
US Top Dance Albums (Billboard)	15
