= Infinite Moment =

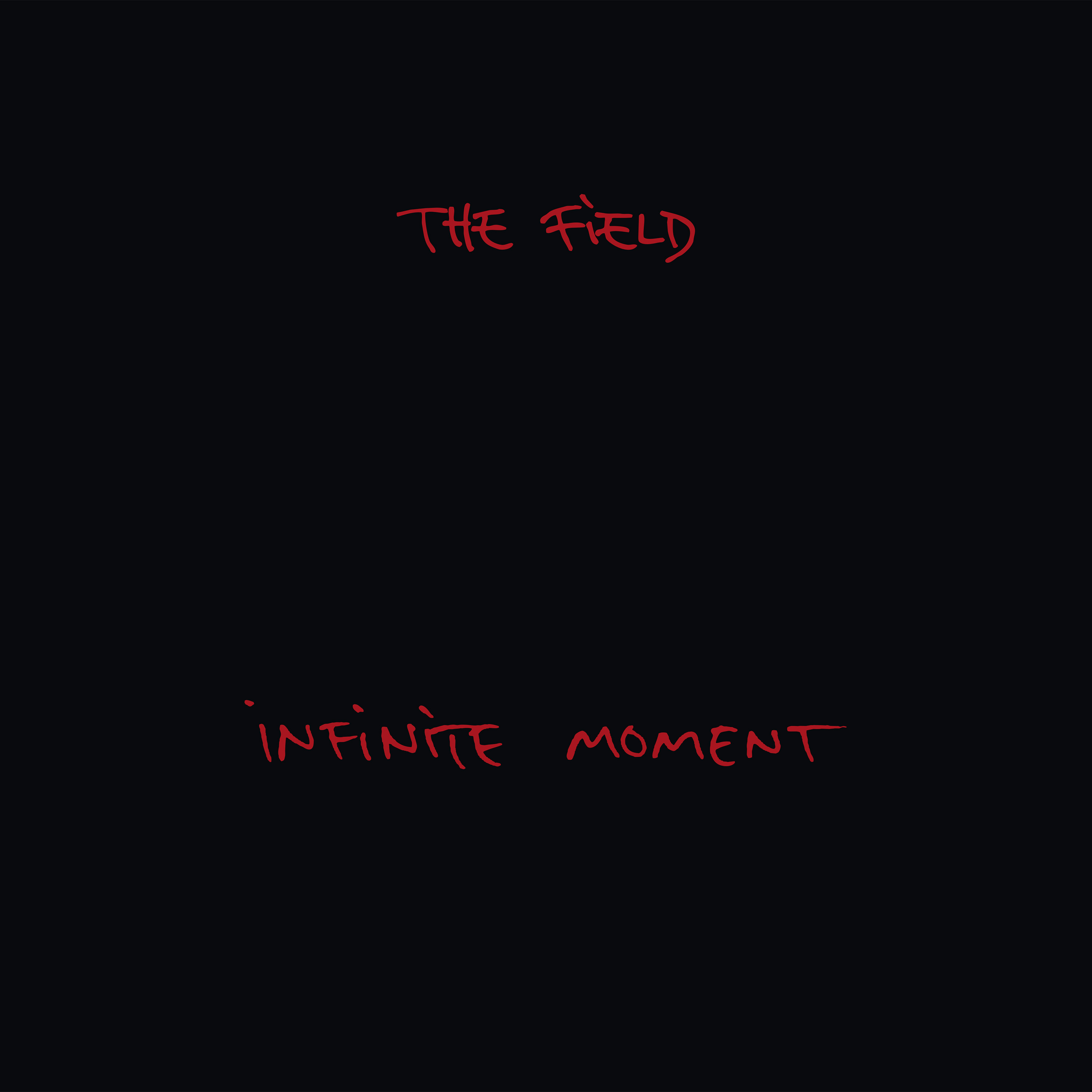

Studio album by The Field
- Released: 21 September 2018
- Genre: Techno; ambient house
- Length: 1:05:24
- Label: Kompakt

The Field chronology
The Follower (2016)	Infinite Moment (2018)

Professional ratings
Aggregate scores
Source	Rating
Metacritic	80/100
Review scores
Source	Rating
AllMusic	4/5 stars
Exclaim!	8/10
The Line of Best Fit	8/10
MusicOMH	4/5 stars
Pitchfork	8/10

Infinite Moment is the sixth studio album by the Swedish electronic music producer and DJ Axel Willner, under his nickname, The Field. It was released on 21 September 2018 by Kompakt.

== Release ==
On 25 July 2018, Willner announced the release and, in a press release, explained the album. "Hope is something I've been missing in the nowadays climate and this album is a relief to me, a type of comfort, like a moment that feels good and you don't want to end."

The first track to be released, "Who Goes There", was announced on 14 August 2018.

== Tour ==
In support of the album, Willner announced a North American tour of six dates for October 2018.

== Critical reception ==
Infinite Moment was met with "generally favorable" reviews from critics. At Metacritic, which assigns a weighted average rating out of 100 to reviews from mainstream publications, the album received an average score of 80 based on 10 reviews. Aggregator Album of the Year gave the release 77 out of 100 based on a critical consensus of 10 reviews.

Fred Thomas of AllMusic explained, "With one eight-minute exception, the six tracks here stretch out past the ten-minute mark, building so incrementally that their subtle drifting takes on an almost ambient quality. The perpetually unraveling nature of Infinite Moment results in a perfectly paced listening experience that's almost impossible not to get lost in." Daniel Sylvester from Exclaim! gave a rave review for the release, writing, "On Infinite Moment, the Field proves that he's such a master of his craft that he can generate the same excitement from briefly moving outside the box as he can revelling back inside it."

== Track listing ==
Infinite Moment track listing
No.	Title	Length
1.	"Made of Steel, Made of Stone"	11:52
2.	"Divide Now"	11:12
3.	"Hear Your Voice"	12:30
4.	"Something Left, Something Right, Something Wrong"	10:33
5.	"Who Goes There"	8:53
6.	"Infinite Moment"	10:24

== Charts ==
Chart performance for Infinite Moment
Chart (2018)	Peak position
UK Dance Albums (OCC)	18
