= Popnoname =

German musician (born 1978)

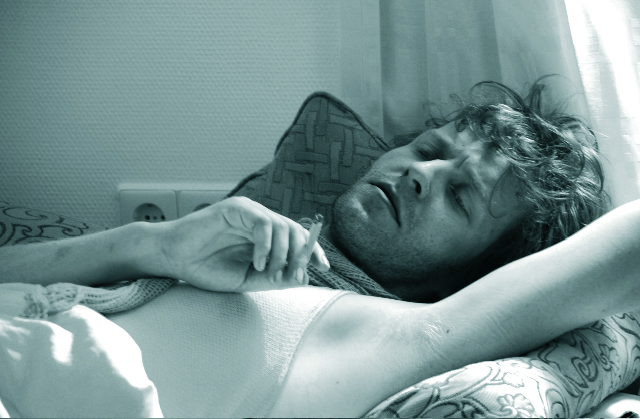
ITALIC 081 Artist Pic Popnoname

Popnoname is the artist name of Jens-Uwe Beyer (born 1978 in Fehmarn). He lives in Cologne.

Apart from his regular releases on Kompakt's Pop Ambient series, he has had a number of 12" releases on Cologne-based labels, including Firm and Italic. His debut album White Album (Italic) was released in 2007, and got loads of positive reviews from the German and international press. The last album was Surrounded by Weather (Italic) along with two 12" Remix Maxis and a Bonus Ep. He recently remixed Eurythmics and Brian Eno & Cluster for the German Recordlabel Grönland.

== Concerts ==
Jens-Uwe Beyer can already look back on a number of live performances, e.g.: Monterrey (Mexico, Aura Club), Thessaloniki (Liebe.!), Porto (Passos Manuell), Amsterdam (Paradiso), Vienna (Icke Micke), Moscow (Solyanka, Propaganda), Hamburg (Übel & Gefährlich), Berlin (Panorama Bar), New York (Bunker), Cambridge (Middlesex Lounge), Tokio (Seco) and London (The End).

== Collaborations ==
He is member of Cologne Tape (Barnt, Crato, Jan Philipp Janzen (Von Spar), Michaela Dippel (Ada), Axel Willner (The Field), Jörg Burger (The Modernist) and John Stanier (Battles) and Co-Founder of the Label Magazine.

== Discography ==
- Piece (12") Firm 2005
- You Are Popnoname (12") Italic 2006
- I Want You For Popnoname (12") Firm 2006
- Credits (12") Italic 2006
- London Paris New York (12") Italic 2007
- White Album (CD,2xLP, Album) Italic 2007
- Surrounded by Weather (CD, LP, ALBUM) Italic 2008
- Surrounded by Weather REMIX 1 (12") Italic 2008
- Surrounded by Weather Bonus Ep (12") Italic 2008
- Spaces (12") Pop! 2009
- Hello Gorgeous (12") Kompakt 2010

Popnoname appears on:

- Pop Ambient 2005 (CD, LP) Gold Kompakt 2004
- Pop Ambient 2006 (CD, LP) Wandel Kompakt 2005
- Pop Ambient 2007 (CD, LP) Hafen Kompakt 2006
- Pop Ambient 2008 (CD, LP) Fembria Kompakt 2007
- Pop Ambient 2009 (CD, LP) Nightliner Kompakt 2009
- Pop Ambient 2010 (CD, LP) Deutz Air Kompakt 2010
- Conny Plank Tribute (CD, LP) 2013
