= Masquer =

Swedish rock band

Masquer is a Swedish rock band, formed in Stockholm in early 2009. Band consists of two members: Kicki Halmos (vocals, keyboard) and Pelle Lundqvist (guitar), who have been friends since early teens. As they were trapped in their earlier works with classic rock, it caused Kicki to have her characteristic voice. "The lack of progress turned into a source of inspiration."

Masquer has played with various Swedish musicians, such as Axel Willner (more known by his stage name The Field). He also has made some remixes for their music (for ex. Happiness).

Because of their low budget, Masquer records their songs in Kicki's bedroom and rehearsal studio, finishing mixes are made in Kicki's living room.

In Cover My Face As The Animals Cry first was Stark Naked that well reflected whole album, then came out Crush then Bang Bang which had some Depeche Mode vibes.

== Discography ==
Covers (2012)

Cover My Face As The Animals Cry (2011)

Stark Naked (Single) (2011)

Happiness (Single) (2011)

== Influences ==
The Smashing Pumpkins, Nirvana, The Cure, Sonic Youth, Cocteau Twins.

== Uses in movies ==
In 2012, Masquer's EP "Covers" was released, in which they've covered John Madara and David White's famous song "You Don't Own Me", that was originally sung by Lesley Gore in 1963. They even took a video clip for the cover, directed by Charlotte Landelius and Theresa Traore Dahblerg.

The song was featured in a trailer for the British-American horror drama television series created by John Logan for Showtime and Sky, Penny Dreadful.
