= Barnt =

- Birth name: Daniel Ansorge
- Born: Kiel
- Genres: Electronic music; Techno; House music
- Occupations: DJ; musician
- Labels: Magazine; Cómeme; Kompakt; Young

Daniel Ansorge (born 1978 in Kiel), better known by stage name Barnt, is a German DJ, electronic musician and record label owner from Cologne, Germany.

== Career ==
Ansorge began releasing music as Barnt in 2010 on his label Magazine, which he had founded the same year with Jens-Uwe Beyer and Crato.

His debut album Magazine 13. was released on Magazine in 2014 and received generally favorable reviews.

Barnt has toured around 40 countries, shows include festivals like Montreux Jazz Festival or Sónar Bogotá and clubs like Berghain or Fabric.

Celine, Chanel, Dior, Givenchy, Moschino and other fashion houses have used Barnt's music to soundtrack their runway shows and ad campaigns.

== Personal life ==
Ansorge studied arts at the Academy of Media Arts Cologne.

== Selected discography ==
=== Album ===
- Magazine 13. (Magazine, 2014)

=== Singles & EPs ===
- What Is A Number, That A Man May Know It? (Magazine, 2010)
- Hark (Mule Musiq, 2012)
- Is This What They Were Born For? (Magazine, 2012)
- Ariola (Cómeme, 2013)
- His Name EP (Hinge Finger, 2014)
- If She Says She Is A Healer, She Is A Healer (Holger, 2017)
- High Hopes And Local Fame (Schalen, 2019)
- ProMetal Fan Decor Only Product (Kompakt, 2022)
- Speicher 125 (Kompakt Extra, 2023) (As Barnt / Mayer)

=== Tracks ===
- Geffen (Cómeme, 2012)

=== Remixes ===
- Jamie xx - Loud Places (Barnt E-Mix) (Young, 2015)
- Tale of Us & Vaal - Monument (Barnt Remix) (Afterlife, 2017)
