= The Field (musician) =

Swedish electronic music producer and DJ

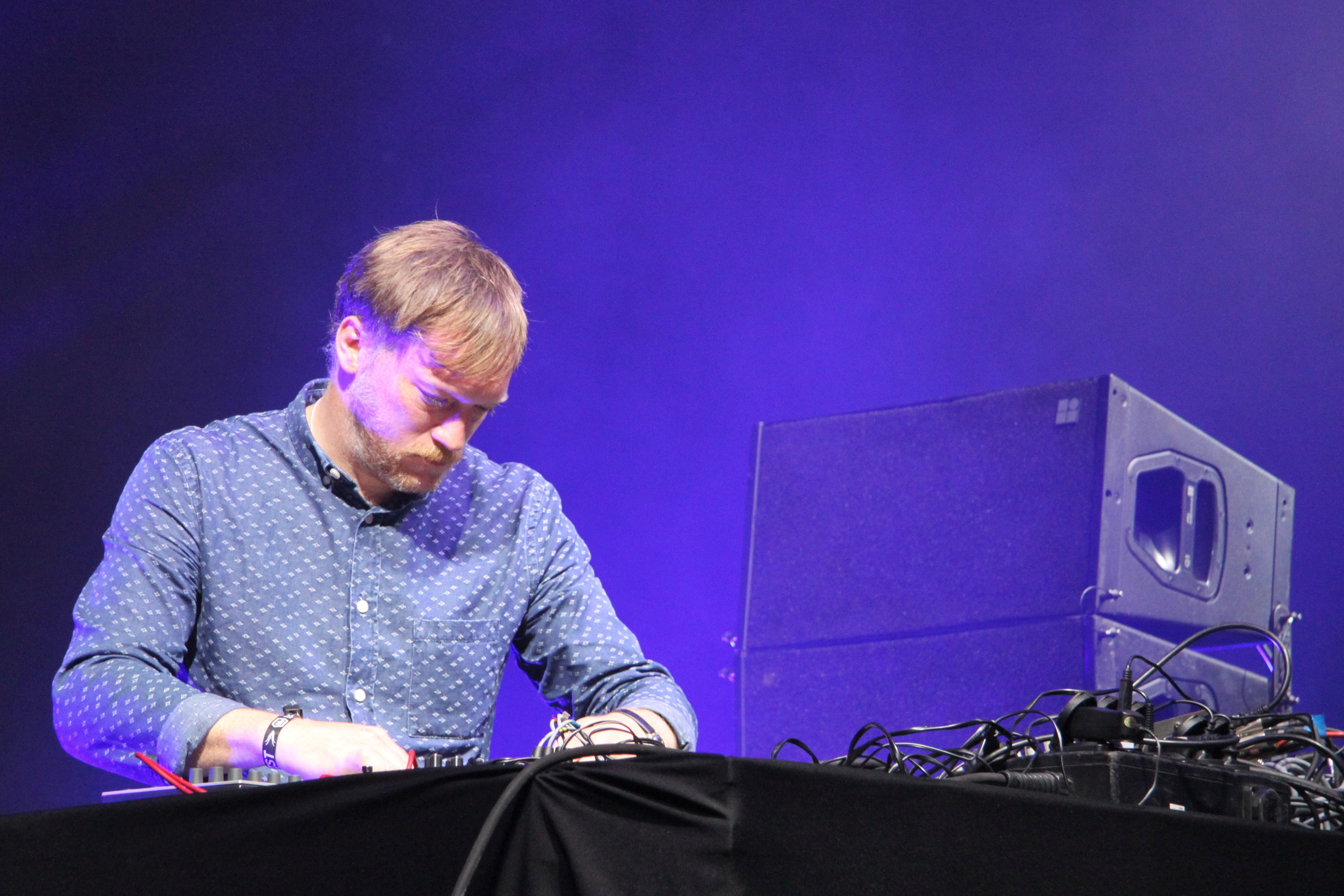
- The Field at Tauron Nowa Muzyka 2014 in Katowice, Poland

Background information
- Also known as: Cordouan; James Larsson; Lars Blek; Loops of Your Heart; Porte; Hands
- Born: Axel Willner
- Origin: Stockholm, Sweden
- Genres: Electronic, minimal techno, microhouse, ambient
- Years active: 1996 – present 2003 – present (as The Field)
- Labels: Kompakt; Garmonbozia
- Website: Garmonbozia.se

Axel Willner is a Swedish electronic music producer and DJ from Stockholm and currently based in Berlin, best known for his releases as The Field, blending micro-samples of pop songs into atmospheric minimal techno.

== History ==
Born in southern Sweden, Willner spent his formative years living in Stockholm and (for a brief time) Lisbon. As a teenager he studied at a formal music academy but cited groups like Misfits and Dead Kennedys as inspiration to pick up the guitar and play in punk bands.

Willner became enamored with the burgeoning electronic music scene in the mid-1990s. He started playing drone and Warp-influenced IDM in Stockholm venues with friend Ola Keijer (alias Ola K) as duo Speedwax. Beginning in the early 2000s, Willner produced guitar-based ambient music using multiple pseudonyms (Lars Blek, Porte, Cordouan, James Larsson) through his own Garmonbozia label, and performed alongside fellow Swedish musicians such as Andreas Tilliander, Sarah Nyberg Pergament (alias Action Biker), and longtime friend Johan Skön.

Willner began recording music under The Field moniker in 2003 as a platform to combine his early affinity for pop artists like Lionel Richie, Kate Bush, and The Four Tops with a myriad of more recent influences ranging from shoegaze bands like Slowdive and My Bloody Valentine to 1990s ambient electronica such as Seefeel and the projects of Wolfgang Voigt (largely the acclaimed albums under Voigt's Gas handle). In 2004, he submitted a demo tape to celebrated German label Kompakt and was subsequently signed. Shortly thereafter, in early 2005, Willner debuted as The Field with a remix of Annie's single "Heartbeat" and also released the "Things Keep Falling Down" 12-inch. The 2006 release of 12-inch "Sun & Ice" (in addition to remixes for James Figurine and 120 Days) added to the growing anticipation for a debut LP.

Kompakt released his first album From Here We Go Sublime on March 26, 2007. The record received near-universal critical acclaim; according to Metacritic, it was the best-reviewed album of the year (tied with Untrue by UK dubstep producer Burial). Resident Advisor placed the record 29th on their list of the decade's top 100 albums. Willner himself has admitted to being surprised by the positive reception, stating that "since it is a bit different than (most) other techno, I thought that people wouldn't like it" and "it ended up bigger than I ever expected."

Later in 2007, Willner became the first musician to participate in the Sound of Light project curated by the Nordic Light Hotel, using his experience at the Stockholm hotel as basis for his EP of the same name. Also during that year he contributed remixes to artists such as Thom Yorke, Battles, and Gui Boratto.

Extensive touring in both Europe and North America supported Sublime, which included appearances at Pitchfork Music Festival, Sónar, Field Day, and All Tomorrow's Parties, as well as select dates with !!! (Chk Chk Chk). But Willner soon grew weary of his solo performances and incorporated a backing band times made up of (at various times) multi-instrumentalist Andreas Söderstrom (of Taken by Trees), bassist/keyboardist Dan Enqvist, and drummer Jesper Skarin. While this collaborative approach to live performance and songwriting in some measure recalled his time playing in rock bands, it also fostered a more organic evolution of The Field's ever-expanding sound palette. Willner abandoned any utilization of his laptop during concerts in favor of live mixing with synthesizers, samplers, and drum machines, although for studio production he has kept the Jeskola Buzz freeware that he had used since his earliest recording endeavors.

The Field's second album Yesterday and Today was released via Kompakt on 18 May 2009. Rather than adhering to the strict 4x4 techno of his debut, Willner incorporated far more diverse influences for his sophomore outing: Manuel Göttsching and 1970s Krautrock, the disco of Giorgio Moroder, the soundtrack works of director John Carpenter, and minimalist composers Steve Reich and Philip Glass. Recorded on a remote island outside of Stockholm, the studio sessions drew upon Willner's renewed interest in collaboration and thus featured contributions from many other musicians, most notably Battles drummer John Stanier on the title track. The album also included a cover of The Korgis' 1980 single "Everybody's Got to Learn Sometime". Following the much-praised release were multiple festival appearances and a stateside tour with The Juan Maclean, and a remix EP with interpretations from Gold Panda, Walls, and Rainbow Arabia. "The More That I Do" was released as the record's lone single, backed with remixes courtesy of Thomas Fehlmann (of The Orb) and Foals.

Following the release of Yesterday and Today, Willner relocated from Stockholm to Germany and went on to produce remixes for artists such as Maserati, Bear in Heaven, Errors, and Harmonia (specifically a track from their Tracks and Traces collaboration with Brian Eno). He then joined Cologne Tape, a German-based collective including (among others) John Stanier, Jens-Uwe Beyer (Popnoname), and Michaela Dippel (Ada), whose Motorik-fueled debut entitled Render was released on 14 June 2010, on the Magazine imprint.

Kompakt issued Looping State of Mind, Willner's third album as The Field, on 24 October 2011. The album expanded on the organic instrumentation of Yesterday and Today in its use of piano, synthesizer, bass guitar, acoustic drums, steel drums, and vibraphone (among others), while focusing on themes of memory and repetition. Keeping in line with its predecessors it garnered a considerable amount of critical praise. A remix EP followed in 2012 with contributions from Junior Boys, Blondes, and Wolfgang Voigt's latest project Mohn. Also in 2012, Willner released And Never Ending Nights as Loops of Your Heart, a more drone-inclined venture through Magazine on 13 February.

Cupid's Head, Willner's fourth LP as The Field, was released on 30 September 2013 via Kompakt. The album was a markedly darker turn in his discography and was also his first release that was solely his work since his debut. On 10 February 2014 Willner released the LP The Soul Is Quick under the alias Hands through Ecstatic Recordings. The Soul Is Quick was recorded in the spring of 2012 and is similar in style to that of Loops Of Your Heart, evolving on the drone/noise sound that was established on And Never Ending Nights.

== Discography ==
All albums, EPs, and singles released on Kompakt unless otherwise noted.

=== Albums ===
- From Here We Go Sublime (2007)
- Yesterday and Today (2009)
- Looping State of Mind (2011)
- Cupid's Head (2013)
- The Follower (2016)
- Infinite Moment (2018)
- Now You Exist (2026)

=== EPs ===
- Things Keep Falling Down (2005)
- Sound of Light (Heartbeats International, 2007)
- Yesterday and Today Remixe (2009)
- Looping State of Mind Remixe (2012)
- Cupid's Head Remixe I (2014)
- Cupid's Head Remixe II (2014)

=== Singles ===
- "Annie" (2005)
- "Sun & Ice" (2006)
- "The More That I Do" (2009)
- "Reflecting Lights Remixe" (2016)
- "Who Goes There" (2018)

=== Compilation exclusives ===
- "Oil" (on Monotoni 1 via Monotoni, 2004)
- "Serenade" (on Monotoni 2 via Monotoni, 2005)
- "Cola" (on Are You Scared to Get Happy? via Friendly Noise, 2006)
- "Kappsta" (on "Pop Ambient 2007" via Kompakt, 2006)
- "The Fan" (on "Sometimes b/w The Fan" via Kalligrammofon, 2007)
- "Kappsta 2" (on "Pop Ambient 2008" via Kompakt, 2007)
- "Caroline" (on Kompakt Total 11, 2010)
- "Comenius Garden" (on Adult Swim Singles Program 2012)
- "Staircase" (on Adult Swim Singles Program 2017)
- "LIGO" (on Metaphonics: The Complete Field Works Recordings, 2018)
- "Soft Numbers IV" (on "V.A. - Continental Drift" via Ideal Europa, 2021)
- "Be Confident" (on "Hot Compilation Volume 2" via Hot Concept, 2024)
- "Axel, Sebastian and Philipp" (on "Free/Future/Music (Altin Village & Mine Mixtape - Volume 1)", 2025)

=== Remixes ===
- Annie – "Heartbeat" (2005; released as "Annie" single)
- Marit Bergman – "No Party" (2006)
- Familjen – "Hög Luft" (2006)
- James Figurine – "55566688833" (2006)
- The Fine Arts Showcase – "Chemical Girl" (2006)
- 120 Days – "Come Out (Come Down, Fade Out, Be Gone)" (2006)
- Battles – "Tonto" (2007)
- Gui Boratto – "Hera" (2007)
- The Honeydrips – "Fall from a Height" (2007)
- Maps – "You Don't Know Her Name" (2007)
- Andreas Tilliander – "Stay Down" (2007)
- The Cinematic Orchestra – "To Build A Home" (2007; unreleased)
- DeVotchKa – "The Clockwise Witness" (2008)
- Popnoname – "Touch" (2008)
- Sasha – "Mongoose" (2008)
- Thom Yorke – "Cymbal Rush" (2008)
- Bear in Heaven – "Ultimate Satisfaction" (2010)
- Delorean – "Real Love" (2010)
- Errors – "Bridge or Cloud?" (2010)
- Harmonia & Eno '76 – "Luneburg Heath" (2010)
- Maserati – "Pyramid of the Moon" (2010)
- Tocotronic – "Schall und Wahn" (2010)
- Walls – "Hang Four" (2010)
- Wildbirds & Peacedrums – "The Well" (2010)
- Junior Boys – "Banana Ripple" (2011)
- Masquer – "Happiness" (2011)
- Miracle – "The Visitor" (2011)
- Differnet - "Summerface" (2011)
- Battles – "Sweetie & Shag" (2012)
- Chairlift – "Met Before" (2012)
- S.C.U.M. – "Amber Hands" (2012)
- Switch Opens - "Joint Clash" (2012)
- At the Drive-In – "One Armed Scissor" (2013)
- Sally Shapiro – "Lives Together" (2013)
- Tame Impala – "Mind Mischief" (2013)
- Bandobranski / Nordmark – "My Head My Ruin" (2014)
- The Dead Heat – "The Dam" (2014)
- Essáy – "Ocarina" (2014)
- Hundred Waters – "Down from the Rafters" (2014)
- I Break Horses – "Faith" (2014)
- Interpol – "Same Town, New Story" (2014)
- Wild Beasts – "Wanderlust" (2014)
- HVOB – "Ghost" (2015)
- Inventions – "Peregrine" (2015)
- OID – "Bright Side of Life" (2015)
- Ryan Teague – "Last Known Position" (2015)
- The Suicide of Western Culture – "Still Breathing But Already Dead" (2015)
- The Fin. - "Through The Deep" (2016)
- The Orb - "9 Elms Over River Eno" (2017)
- Deeds - "Disorder" (2017)
- Menke - "Echo" (2019)
- Yann Tiersen - Diouz An Noz (2020)
- I Break Horses - "Death Engine" (2020)
- Promise And The Monster - "Closed My Eyes" (2021)
- R. Missing - "Saturnining" (2022)
- Jörg Sasse - "Framed VII" (2022)
- Gone To Color - "The 606 feat. Jessie Stein" (2023)
- Pedro Vian - "The Woman's Voice Inside Whispering Ride Or Die" (2023)
- The Field and Greta Schloch - "Alter" (2023)
- Kite - Losing [feat. Anna von Hausswolff & Henric de la Cour] (2024)

=== with Cologne Tape ===
- Render (LP via Magazine, 2010)
- "Moorpark" (on Pop Ambient 2014 compilation via Kompakt)
- "Flutes by Phil Collins" (on My Heart's in My Hand, and My Hand is Pierced, and My Hand's in the Bag, and the Bag is Shut, and My Heart is Caught compilation by Phil Collins via Nero Magazine, 2015)
- Welt (LP via Magazine, 2017)

=== as Hands ===
- The Soul is Quick (LP via Ecstatic, 2014)

=== as Loops of Your Heart ===
- And Never Ending Nights (LP via Magazine, 2012)
- "Riding the Bikes" (on Pop Ambient 2012 compilation via Kompakt)
- "Like a Wolf" (on Air Texture III compilation, selected by Deadbeat via Air Texture, 2013)

=== as Cordouan ===
- 25-08-95 (EP via Subsource, 2002; reissued as Water EP via Garmonbozia, 2003)
- Love (EP via MechanizedMind, 2003)

=== as Lars Blek ===
- Untitled (EP via Garmonbozia, 2002)
- Untitled (EP via Garmonbozia, 2003; collaboration with Johan Skön)
- "Ensam" (on Expeditions #1 compilation via Starfly, 2003)
- "My Everything" (feat. Action Biker; on Are You Scared to Get Happy? compilation via Friendly Noise, 2006)
- Lars Blek (with Pelle Lundquist, 2020)

=== as Porte ===
- Porte (EP via Subsource, 2001)
- 8-18 (EP via Subsource, 2001)
- Untitled (EP via Garmonbozia, 2002)

=== as James Larsson ===
- "The Breakdown" (on Monotoni 1 via Monotoni, 2004)

=== with Speedwax ===
- "Train To?" (on Friendly People Making Noise compilation via Friendly Noise, 2003)

=== as Fed Lithe ===
- "Bee mee moo fru hig sul" (on Memories Overlooked: A Tribute To The Caretaker compilation via Nmesh, 2017)

== See also ==
- List of ambient music artists
