= Elektron (company) =

Swedish musical instrument company

Elektron Music Machines
- Type: Private
- Industry: Musical instruments
- Founded: 1998; 28 years ago
- Founder: Daniel Hansson, Anders Gärder, Mikael Räim
- Headquarters: Gothenburg, Sweden
- Area served: Worldwide
- Key people: Alexander Hellström (CEO)
- Products: Musical instruments; Effects units; Music software
- Parent: Bonnier Capital
- Website: elektron.se

Elektron is a manufacturer of electronic musical instruments based in Gothenburg, Sweden. It produces instruments such as synthesisers, drum machines and samplers.

Elektron was founded in 1998 by three students at Chalmers University of Technology. Its first product was the SidStation, which found popularity for its retro sound. Its next, the Machinedrum drum machine, was released in 2002 and introduced several features that became standard in Elektron instruments.

The Octatrack, a sampler, was released in 2010 and became a bestseller. From 2012, Elektron introduced a series of analogue instruments, the Analog Four, Analog Keys and Analog Rytm. These were followed by a range of more compact instruments, the Digitakt, Digitone and Syntakt.

Elektron users include Panda Bear, Thom Yorke, Sophie, the Knife, Timbaland and Depeche Mode. In 2026, Elektron was acquired by the investment firm Bonnier Capital.

== History ==
=== Founding and SidStation ===
Elektron was founded in 1997 as a class project by Daniel Hansson, Anders Gärder and Mikael Räim while they were students at Chalmers University of Technology in Gothenburg, Sweden. Their first product was the SidStation synthesiser, released in 1999, which used the MOS Technology SID chip from the 1982 Commodore 64 home computer. It was popular for its unique features and its retro sound, which evoked old video game soundtracks.

=== Machinedrum and Octatrack ===
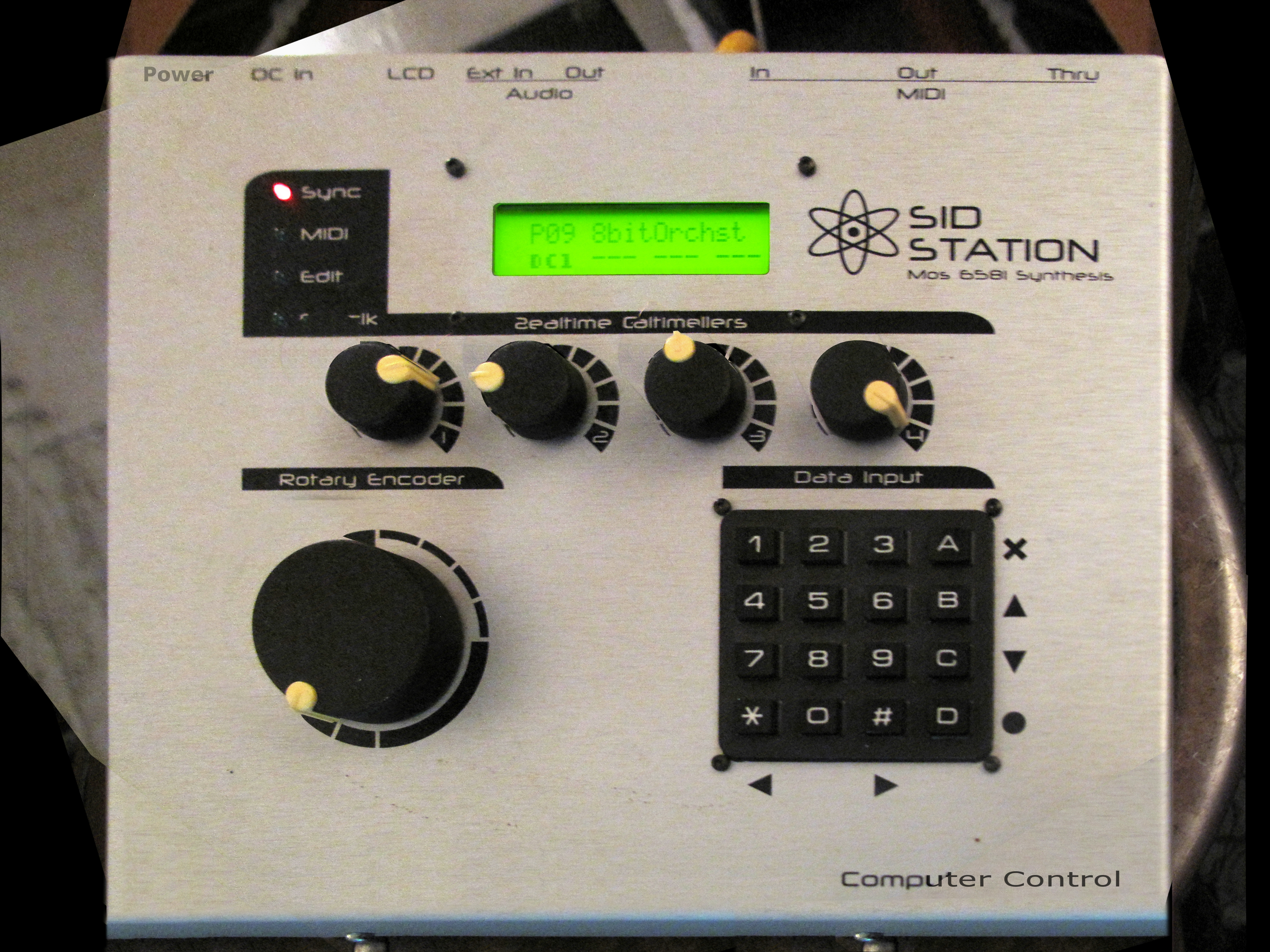
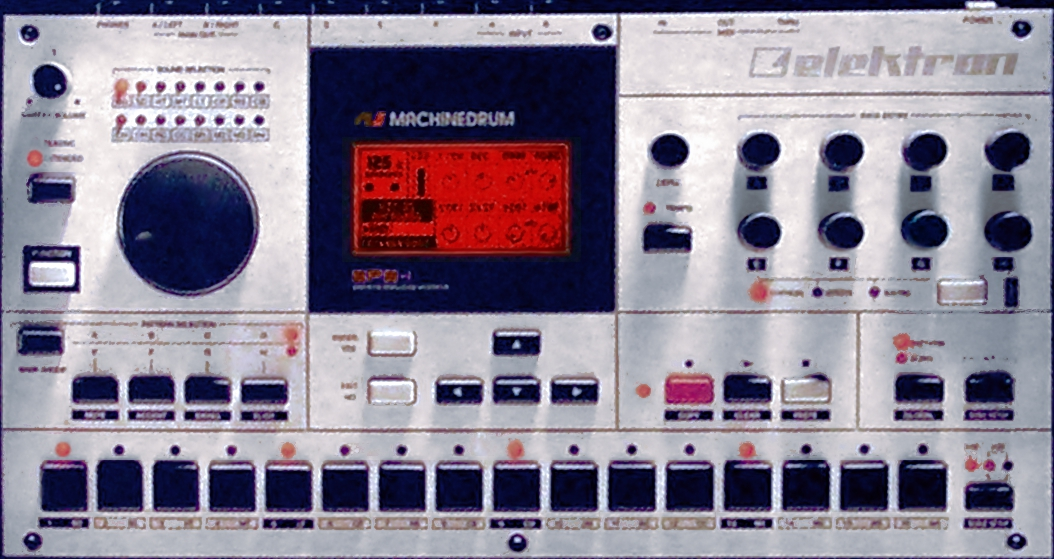

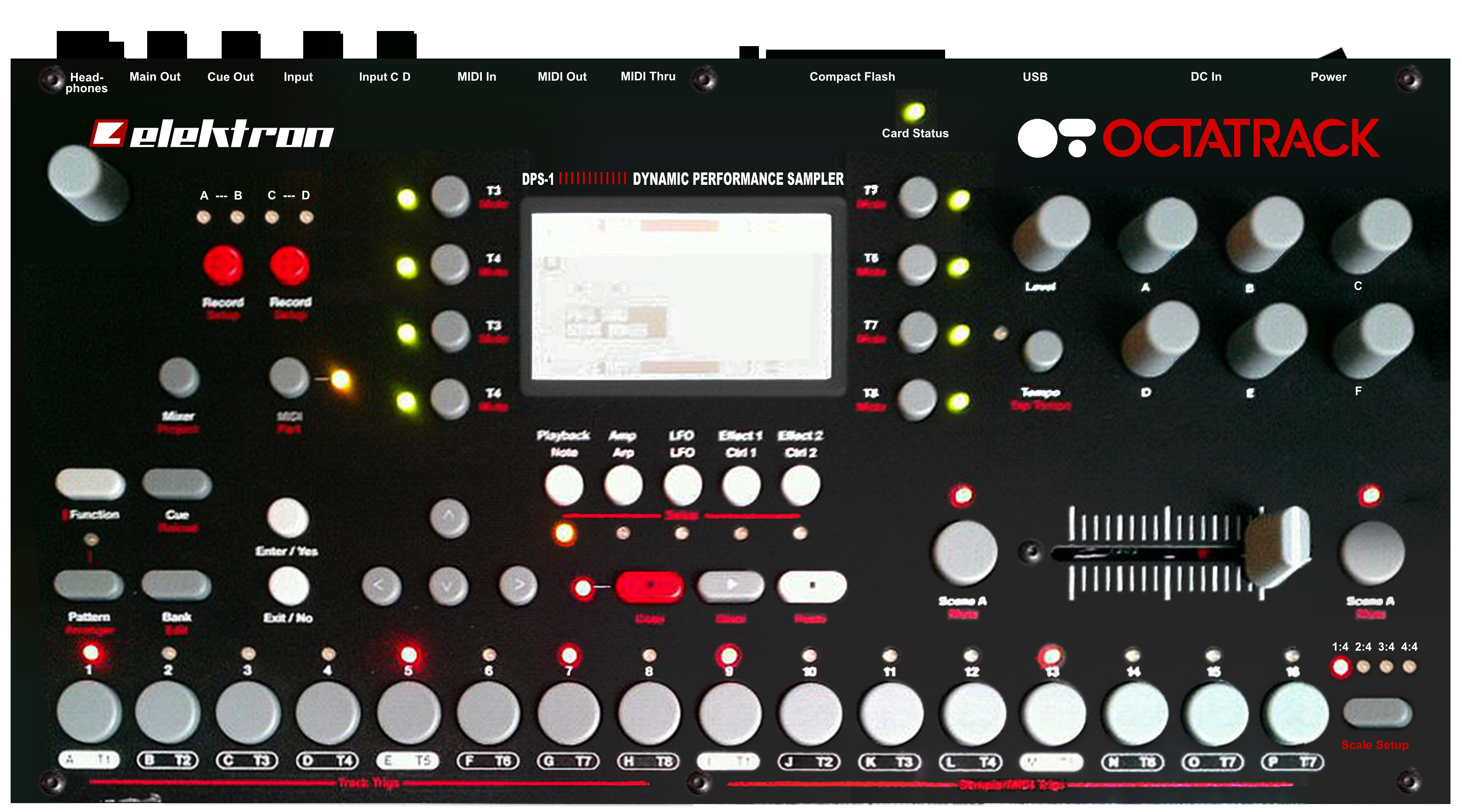
From top: SidStation (1999), Machinedrum SPS-1 (2002), Octatrack (2011)

The next Elektron product, the Machinedrum drum machine, was released in 2002. It introduced several features that became standard in Elektron products, such as parameter-locking, which allows users to adjust settings for individual steps in a sequence. The Machinedrum could create more complex beats than other drum machines at the time and helped popularise Elektron globally.

In 2009, Jonas Hillman joined Elektron as a manger and investor, and later became the CEO and majority owner. Under Hillman, Elektron opened offices in Los Angeles and Tokyo. In 2010, Elektron released a sampler, the Octatrack. MusicTech described it as Elektron's most famous design and its longest-running product; it was still in production as of 2024. Following the release of the Octatrack, Elektron began generating multi-million dollar sales.

=== Analogue synthesis ===
In 2012, Elektron released its first analogue instrument, the Analog Four synthesiser. It was followed by the Analog Keys synthesiser in 2013 and the Analog Rytm drum machine in 2014. According to MusicTech, the Analog instruments are among Elektron's "most beloved devices".

Between 2013 and 2014, Elektron sales doubled and profits almost quadrupled. It made a profit of SEK 4.3 million in 2013 and 1.1 million in 2014. As of 2015, Elektron had 42 employees. Its products were built and assembled in Borås, with plans to convert a warehouse into a factory. That year, Elektron released the Overbridge software, which allows its instruments to be connected to computers via USB.

=== Digitakt, Digitone Keys and Syntakt ===
In 2016, Elektron released the Analog Heat, a sound processing unit. In 2017, Elektron announced the Digitakt, a combined drum machine and sampler. It marked a move to more compact instruments. In 2018, Elektron released the Digitone, its first FM synthesiser followed in 2019 by the Digitone Keys synthesiser. It offers a simplified structure and user interface compared to FM synthesisers such as the Yamaha DX7, with limited ratio values making it easier to create "tonal, harmonically coherent" sounds.

During the COVID-19 pandemic, when sales of electronic musical equipment increased, the online marketplace Reverb reported a particular increase in Elektron orders. Jim Tuerk, Reverb's business development director, said Elektron instruments were "intricate pieces of gear and require more time to master" and that the sales suggested people were making more complex music at home. The Digitakt was the highest-selling electronic instrument on Reverb that year.

In 2022, Elektron released the Syntakt, combining analogue elements of previous instruments with new digital synthesis. The Digitakt II, with expanded sequencer length, storage and RAM, was released in 2024. In the same year, Elektron released the Digitone II, with additional drum and synthesiser functions.

As of 2026, Alexander Hellström was the Elektron CEO. On 8 April, Elektron was acquired by the investment firm Bonnier Capital. Elektron said there were no plans for layoffs or restructuring and that their product plans had not changed. In September, Elektron announced the Outbox 8, a means to connect electronic instruments, effects and mixers visa USB, MIDI or CV/gate.

== Legacy ==
In 2024, MusicTech wrote that "Elektron" was becoming a generic trademark used to describe a "style of performative sequencing", reflecting its influence. Elektron users include Panda Bear,, Thom Yorke, Sophie, the Knife, Timbaland and Depeche Mode.
