= Elektron Octatrack =

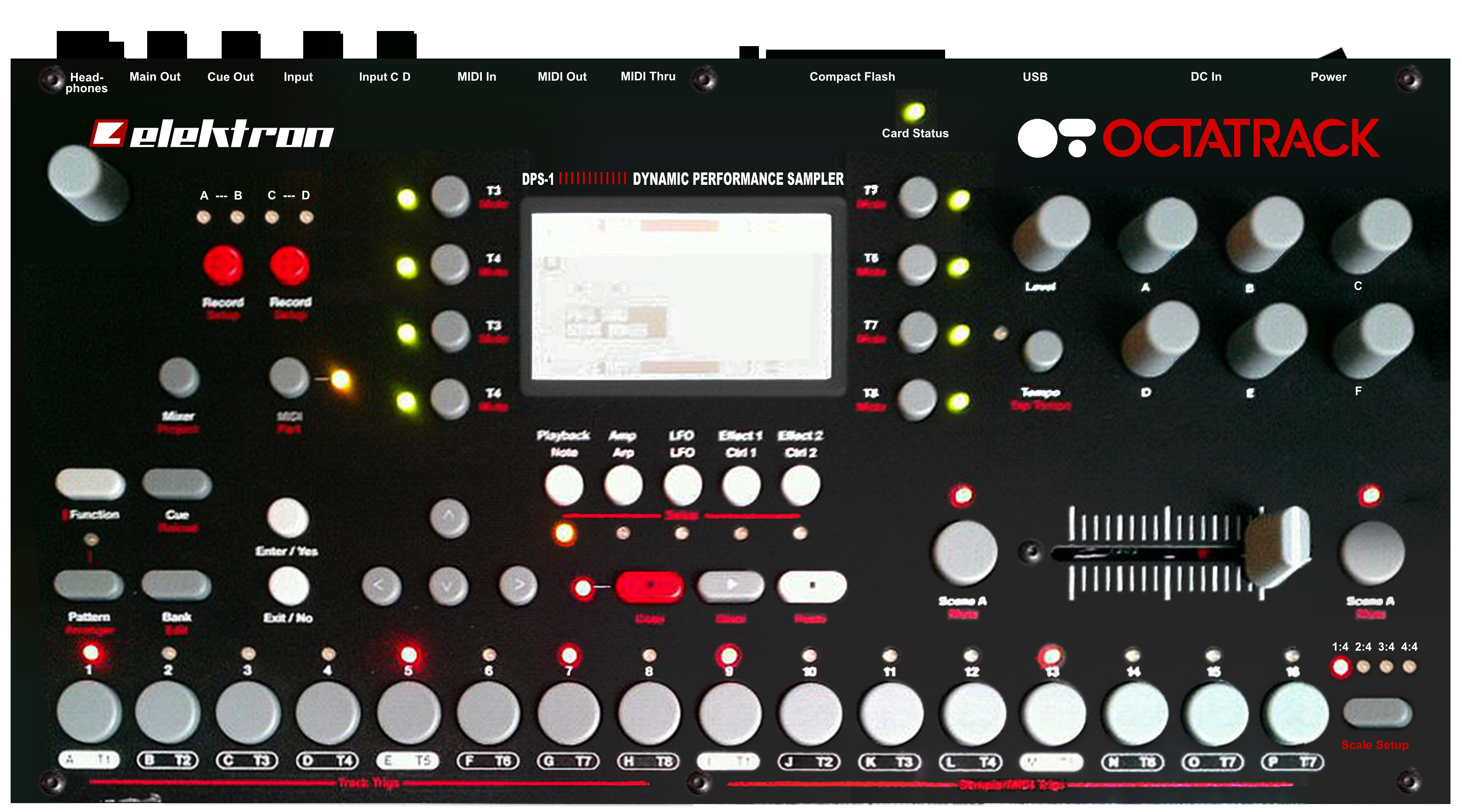
Elektron Octatrack

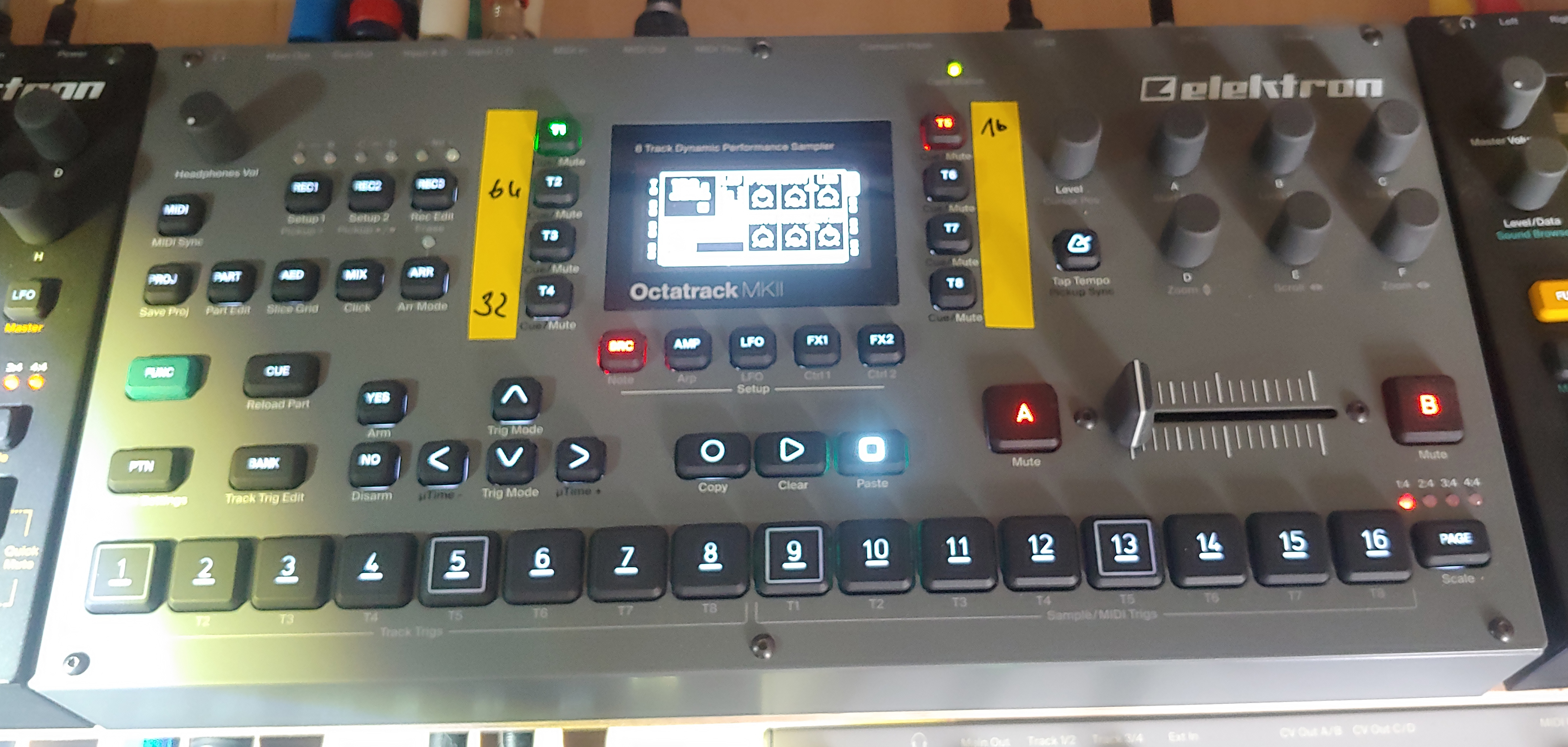
Elektron Octatrack MKII

The Octatrack DPS-1 (Dynamic Performance Sampler) is a digital electronic music instrument made by Elektron. An LCD surrounded by hand controls allows for the continuous playback of stereo audio and MIDI data while the user manipulates sampler, step sequencer, mixer, and effect parameters.

A redesigned Octatrack MKII was announced in June 2017, featuring an OLED display and backlit buttons. This version also added additional buttons for easier access to various functions. Aside from these hardware changes, the original and MKII versions function the same and run the same software.

In December 2020, 10 years after its original release, Elektron produced a limited number of Anniversary Edition units.

== Features ==
A CompactFlash card reader lets arbitrary digital sound recordings be loaded into RAM for sample manipulation and step sequencing, or the same functionality can be applied to live recordings made by the Octatrack from the four input audio jacks. Up to eight tracks of these sequenced audio samples can be mixed to two pairs of stereo output jacks and can be monitored with a stereo headphone jack.

Buttons spanning the lower part of the instrument usually represent musical time points with up to 64 points spread across four pages of the 16 buttons. As each step is taken at the set tempo an LED lights to show which button the sequence is at. The musician programs the step sequencer to cause playback on one or more of the audio outputs by pressing these buttons to indicate where to start the sound. Eight more tracks for MIDI sequencing work in a similar way to send MIDI information across the MIDI Out port. Thousands of these programmed sequences can be stored to the CompactFlash card.

There is a MIDI In port for external control and Thru port for MIDI chaining.

A USB 2.0 port allows upgrading the operating system and writing to the CompactFlash card. Its firmware runs on a Freescale ColdFire CPU assisted by a Freescale DSP56xxx DSP for real-time audio.

Each of the eight audio tracks can have up to two effects which are selected from EQ, compression, flanging, delay, reverb, or others.

Sample and effect Parameters can be smoothly adjusted with the slider or by specifying a setting at a point in time with a step sequencer button, and five pages of parameters adjustable by six knobs are shown on the LCD.
