= Yesterday and Today (The Field album) =

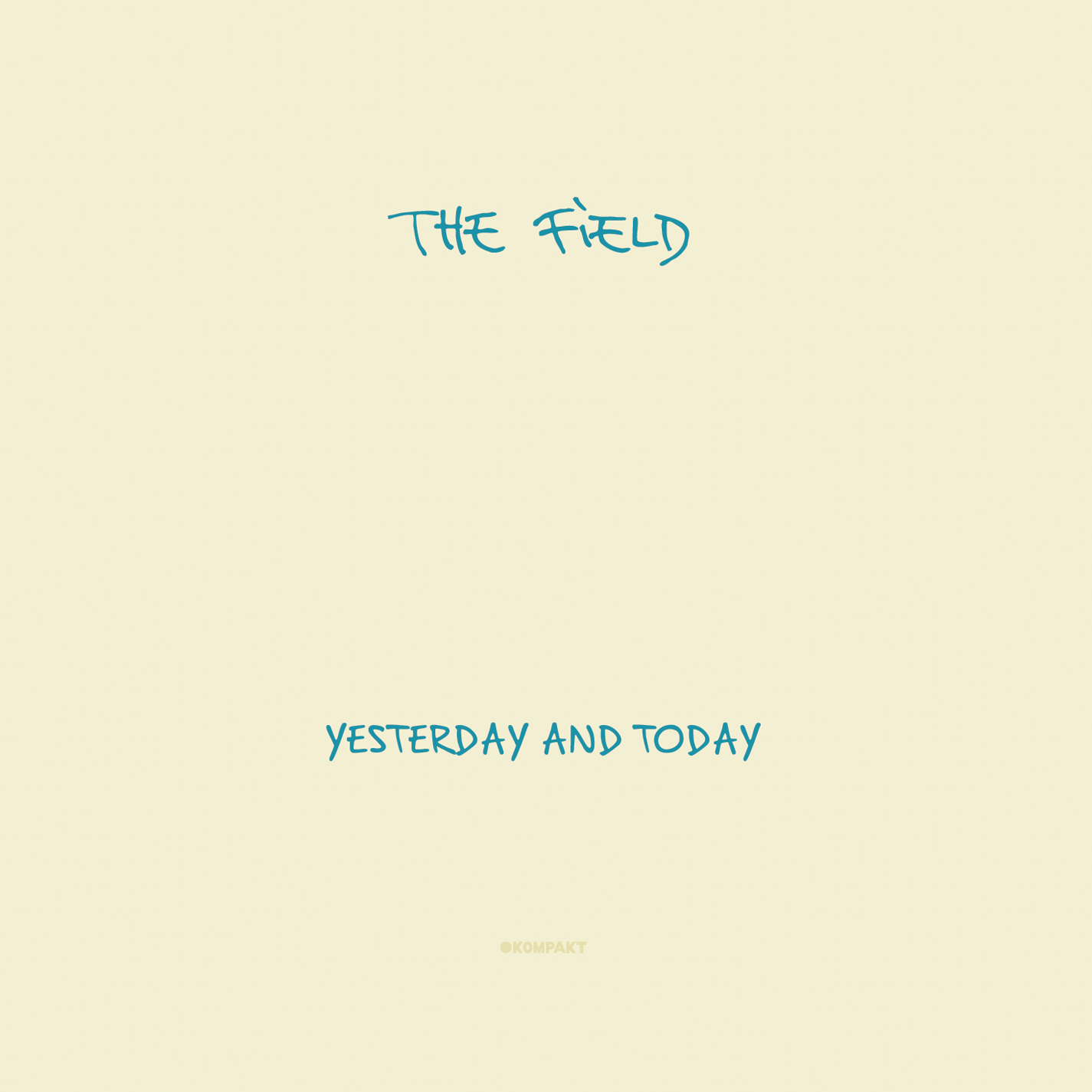

Studio album by The Field
- Released: 25 May 2009
- Genre: Techno
- Length: 60:38
- Label: Kompakt
- Producer: Axel Willner

The Field chronology
From Here We Go Sublime (2007)	Yesterday and Today (2009)	Looping State of Mind (2011)

Singles from Yesterday and Today
- 1. "The More That I Do" Released: 24 April 2009

Professional ratings
Aggregate scores
Source	Rating
AnyDecentMusic?	7.1/10
Metacritic	79/100
Review scores
Source	Rating
AllMusic	4/5 stars
The A.V. Club	A−
Drowned in Sound	8/10
Los Angeles Times	3/4 stars
Now	5/5
Pitchfork	8.0/10
PopMatters	8/10
Resident Advisor	4.0/5
Rolling Stone	2.5/5 stars
Spin	7/10

Yesterday and Today is the second studio album by Swedish electronic music producer Axel Willner under his alias The Field, released by Kompakt on 26 May 2009. The follow-up to his critically acclaimed debut From Here We Go Sublime, Yesterday and Today was recorded in one week in a deserted school on a Swedish island. "The More That I Do" was released as the album's lead single on 24 April 2009.

Featuring six tracks, Yesterday and Today has been described by Kompakt as "more organic than its predecessor." The album features a guest appearance by Battles drummer John Stanier on its title track, as well as a cover of The Korgis' "Everybody's Got to Learn Sometime".

== Track listing ==
All tracks are written by Axel Willner, except where noted.

No.	Title	Writer(s)	Length
1.	"I Have the Moon, You Have the Internet"		8:00
2.	"Everybody's Got to Learn Sometime"	James Warren	6:47
3.	"Leave It"		11:34
4.	"Yesterday and Today"		10:04
5.	"The More That I Do"		8:32
6.	"Sequenced"		15:41
Total length:			60:38

== Personnel ==
- Johan Grimlund – guitar, vibraphone
- John Stanier – drums
- Dan Enqvist – drums, bass, piano, vibraphone, guitar, backing vocals
- Ola Keijer – piano, backing vocals
- Axel Willner, Jörg Burger, Michael Mayer – mixing

== Charts ==
Chart (2009)	Peak position
US Heatseekers Albums (Billboard)	47
US Top Dance Albums (Billboard)	15
