= From Here We Go Sublime =

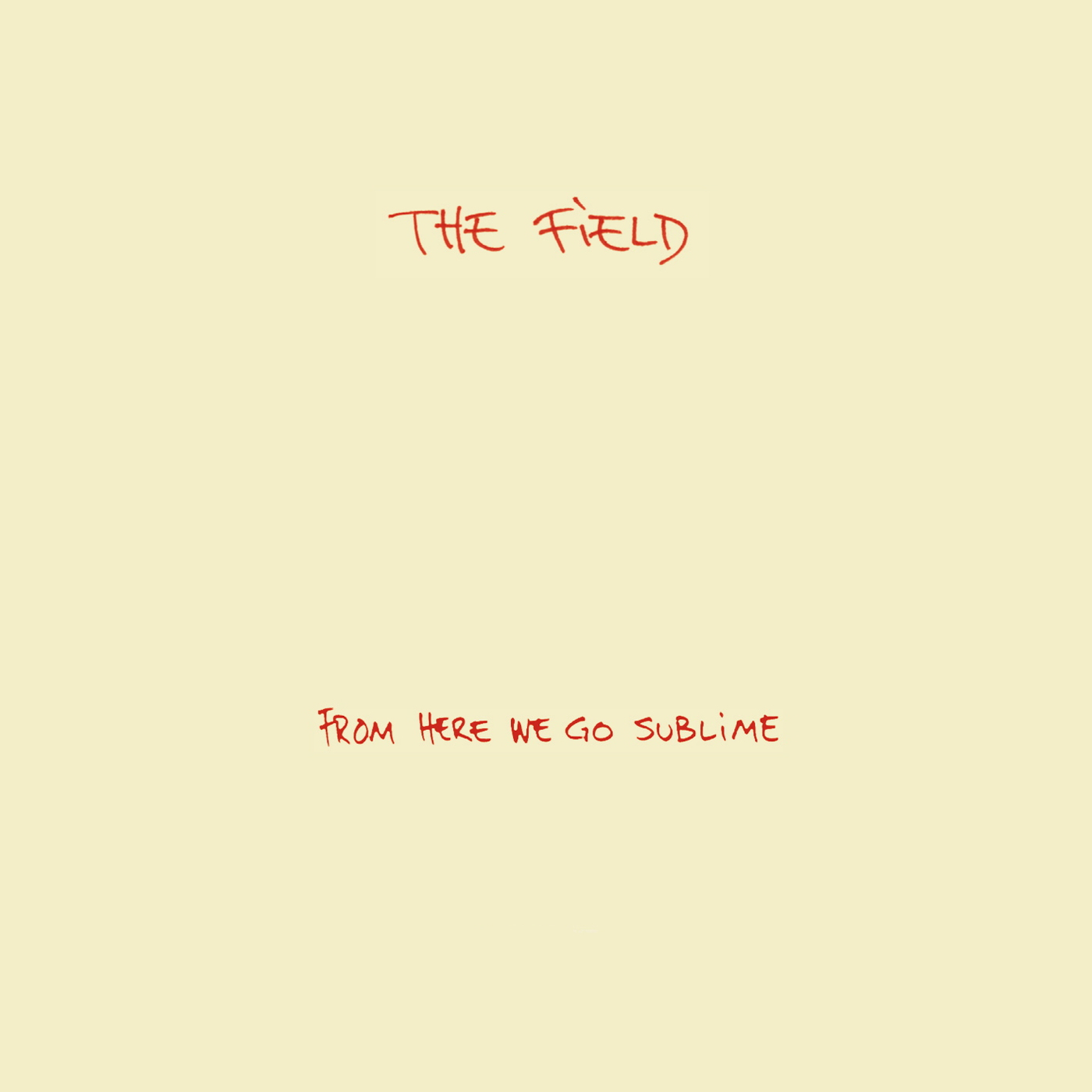

Studio album by The Field
- Released: 26 March 2007
- Recorded: 2004–06
- Genre: Techno
- Length: 65:41
- Label: Kompakt
- Producer: Axel Willner

The Field chronology
From Here We Go Sublime (2007)	Yesterday and Today (2009)

From Here We Go Sublime is the debut studio album by Swedish electronic music producer Axel Willner under his alias The Field, released by Kompakt on 26 March 2007.

== Production ==
From Here We Go Sublime consists primarily of tracks recorded by Willner as the Field between 2004 and 2006, though the album also includes tracks produced before this period, one of which was originally recorded under a different alias. Willner's production style is sample-based, employing cut-up and resequenced manipulations of snippets of other artists' music, including Kate Bush's "Under Ice" on "Over the Ice", Lionel Richie's "Hello" on "A Paw in My Face", Fleetwood Mac's "Everywhere" on "Everyday", and The Flamingos' "I Only Have Eyes for You" on "From Here We Go Sublime".

== Style and themes ==
Despite From Here We Go Sublime being released on the Kompakt label, known primarily for German techno, the album's sound has been described as "less techno than it is trance". Jess Harvell of Pitchfork also noted the style's similarity due to an "anthemic bigness to Willner's little sounds, a certain shameless bombastic quality to the way he deploys his loops and builds his arpeggio" and the "elementary drum tracks, often just a deflated machine thump flecked with hi-hat hiss".

The themes of the music on From Here We Go Sublime has been noted for its "unabashed emotionalism" with songs suggesting "bliss", "melancholy" and "loss". From Here We Go Sublime's song titles have been described as vague, and the songs themselves having no intelligible lyrics beyond sampled vocals which have been edited and chopped up. Willner dislikes lyrical content and chose to treat sampled vocals as instruments rather than as voices, as "it gives (the music) a special feeling."

== Release and reception ==
Professional ratings
Aggregate scores
Source	Rating
Metacritic	90/100
Review scores
Source	Rating
AllMusic	4/5 stars
The Boston Phoenix	3.5/4 stars
Collective	5/5
The Irish Times	4/5 stars
NME	8/10
Pitchfork	9.0/10
PopMatters	8/10
Resident Advisor	5/5
Stylus Magazine	A
Uncut	4/5 stars

From Here We Go Sublime was released on compact disc and vinyl record by Kompakt. The album was released to great critical acclaim from various publications, and, along with Burial's Untrue, was the best-received album of 2007 on the music critic aggregators site Metacritic. It was named the 29th best album of the decade by Resident Advisor. Willner was surprised by the positive reception to the album, stating that "since it is a bit different than (most) other techno, I thought that people wouldn't like it."

== Track listing ==
All tracks are written by Axel Willner.

No.	Title	Length
1.	"Over the Ice"	6:56
2.	"A Paw in My Face"	5:24
3.	"Good Things End"	6:08
4.	"The Little Heart Beats So Fast"	5:25
5.	"Everyday"	6:59
6.	"Silent"	7:35
7.	"The Deal"	10:03
8.	"Sun & Ice"	6:34
9.	"Mobilia"	6:28
10.	"From Here We Go Sublime"	4:09
Total length:		65:41
