= Multila =

Studio album by Vladislav Delay
- Released: February 8, 2000
- Genre: Ambient; minimal techno; dub techno; glitch; IDM; experimental
- Length: 73:00
- Label: Chain Reaction
- Producer: Vladislav Delay

Vladislav Delay chronology
Entain (2000)	Multila (2000)	Anima (2001)

Multila is a compilation album by Finnish producer Sasu Ripatti under the name Vladislav Delay. It compiles the Huone and Ranta EPs which Ripatti released on Basic Channel's Chain Reaction label in 1999 and 2000; he has regarded it as a standard album. It was reissued in 2007 by Ripatti's Huume imprint and again on vinyl in 2020 with a remaster by Rashad Becker.

The album consists of six ambient tracks and the 22-minute minimal techno composition "Huone".

== Critical reception ==
Professional ratings
Review scores
Source	Rating
AllMusic	4.5/5 stars
PopMatters	6/10

Multila is one of Ripatti's most highly regarded releases as Vladislav Delay, receiving four and a half stars from Allmusic and being referred to as "the finest album in the hugely impressive Vladislav Delay canon" by Boomkat, though a review of the 2007 reissue by PopMatters said "it never really feels like a complete work."

The experimental psychedelic band Animal Collective praised the album in a multi-article presentation detailing their influences for Spin magazine in 2012.

== Track listing ==
1. "Ranta" (4:29)
2. "Raamat" (7:16)
3. "Huone" (22:04)
4. "Viite" (7:41)
5. "Karrha" (11:47)
6. "Pietola" (16:24)
7. "Nesso" (3:11)
