= Skee Mask =

German electronic music producer

- Also known as: SCNTST
- Born: Bryan Müller; 1993 (age 32–33)
- Origin: Munich, Germany
- Genres: Techno; breakbeat; ambient; IDM; Dub techno
- Occupations: Record producer; DJ
- Years active: 2010–present
- Labels: Ilian Tape; Boysnoize Records

Bryan Müller (born 1993), known professionally as Skee Mask, is a German electronic music producer and DJ. Raised in Emmering, near Munich, he first released music as SCNTST on Boysnoize Records before developing the Skee Mask alias on Ilian Tape. His music draws on techno, breakbeat, ambient, IDM, dub techno and jungle. His Skee Mask albums include Shred (2016), Compro (2018), Pool (2021) and Resort (2024).

== Career ==
=== Early life and SCNTST ===
Müller was born in 1993 and raised in Emmering, a village near Munich. In his youth, he played in rock bands, and in 2010 he began making electronic music with Ableton Live. Under the name SCNTST, he posted electronic tracks online and attracted the attention of Boys Noize, who signed him to Boysnoize Records. His debut single, "Monday", was released in 2011, followed by the album Self Therapy in 2013.

=== Skee Mask and Ilian Tape ===
While continuing as SCNTST, Müller began making more experimental material. After contact with Dario and Marco Zenker of Ilian Tape, he released the Serum EP as Skee Mask in 2014. The project was initially anonymous; Müller said in a 2016 interview that he wanted listeners to focus on the music rather than his face or age.

Skee Mask's debut album, Shred, was released by Ilian Tape in 2016. Resident Advisor described the album as moving him from Ilian Tape's "secret weapon" to its breakout star. His second Skee Mask album, Compro, was released in 2018 and received positive reviews from Pitchfork and Resident Advisor. Pool, released in 2021 on Ilian Tape, was issued through Bandcamp and physical formats rather than through major streaming services. Resort, his fourth Skee Mask full-length, was released by Ilian Tape in June 2024.

In January 2022, Müller removed his Skee Mask albums and EPs from Spotify, criticizing the platform's treatment of music-makers. Resident Advisor reported that Ilian Tape subsequently removed its catalogue from the service as well. In 2025, he released E, the fifth entry in an alphabetical series of archival collections that began with A in 2022. In September 2025, Müller and Lara Fein launched the record label A Strange Child. Its first release was ASC - EP1 by Konrad Wehrmeister.

== Style and influences ==
AllMusic describes Skee Mask as a project for "hazy, atmospheric breakbeat techno" influenced by IDM and jungle, contrasting it with the brighter SCNTST alias. Ilian Tape's artist profile cites older techno labels such as Chain Reaction, Warp Records and Counterbalance as influences, and describes his DJ sets as techno, ambient and experimental. In a 2016 interview with Inverted Audio, Müller cited early jungle, hip-hop and experimental music among his influences.

== Awards ==
- 2023: Förderpreis für Musik der Landeshauptstadt München

== Discography ==
=== Albums ===
==== As Skee Mask ====
- Shred (Ilian Tape, 2016)
- Compro (Ilian Tape, 2018)
- Pool (Ilian Tape, 2021)
- Resort (Ilian Tape, 2024)

==== As SCNTST ====
- Self Therapy (Boysnoize Records, 2013)
- Puffer (Boysnoize Records, 2015)
- Scenes and Sketches from the Lab (Boysnoize Records, 2018)

=== EPs ===
==== As Skee Mask ====
- Serum (Ilian Tape, 2014)
- Junt (Ilian Tape, 2015)
- 2012 (Ilian Tape, 2017)
- ISS002 (Ilian Tape, 2017)
- 808BB (Ilian Tape, 2019)
- ISS004 (Ilian Tape, 2019)
- ISS005 (Ilian Tape, 2020)
- ISS006 (Ilian Tape, 2020)
- ISS007 (Ilian Tape, 2022)
- ISS008 (Ilian Tape, 2022)
- ISS009 (Ilian Tape, 2023)
- Patchworks Vol. 1 (Obligated Records, 2023; with MJK, featuring Riko Dan)
- ISS010 (Ilian Tape, 2024)
- ISS011: Stressmanagement (Ilian Tape, 2025)
- ISS012 (Ilian Tape, 2026)

==== As SCNTST ====
- Monday (Boysnoize Records, 2011)
- Premelodic Structures (Boysnoize Records, 2012)
- Forever 16 (Boysnoize Records, 2014)
- 4Friendz (Boysnoize Records, 2015)
- Thru Infinity (Boysnoize Records, 2016)

=== Archival collections ===
==== As Skee Mask ====
- A (2022)
- B (2022)
- C (2024)
- D (2024)
- E (2025)
- F (2026)

==== As SCNTST ====
- Image Is Everything Pt. 1 (+ Phaser Jams) (2015)
- Image Is Everything Pt. 2 (2020)
- Image Is Everything Pt. 3 (2021)
