= Convivial =

Studio album by Luomo
- Released: 24 October 2008
- Genre: Electronic
- Length: 66:47
- Label: Huume
- Producer: Sasu Ripatti

Luomo chronology
Paper Tigers (2006)	Convivial (2008)	Plus (2011)

Convivial is a studio album by Finnish record producer Sasu Ripatti under the pseudonym Luomo. It was released on 24 October 2008 through Huume. It received generally favorable reviews from critics.

== Background ==
Sasu Ripatti, also known as Vladislav Delay, is a Finnish record producer. Convivial is his fourth solo album as Luomo, following Vocalcity (2000), The Present Lover (2003), and Paper Tigers (2006). It features guest appearances from Cassy, Sascha Ring (Apparat), Jake Shears of Scissor Sisters, Sue Cie, Johanna Iivanainen, Robert Owens, and Chubbs. It was released on 24 October 2008 through Ripatti's own record label Huume. In the United States, it was released on 11 November 2008.

== Critical reception ==
Professional ratings
Aggregate scores
Source	Rating
Metacritic	78/100
Review scores
Source	Rating
AllMusic	4/5 stars
Cokemachineglow	78%
The Guardian	4/5 stars
Pitchfork	8.5/10
PopMatters	8/10
Resident Advisor	3.0/5
Slant Magazine	3/5 stars
Spin	7/10
Tiny Mix Tapes	3.5/5 stars
XLR8R	8.5/10

According to the review aggregator Metacritic, Convivial received "generally favorable reviews" based on a weighted average score of 78 out of 100 from 13 critic scores.

Andy Kellman of AllMusic stated, "For its lack of rush-inducing highs and novel sounds, the album is immensely pleasurable, with fleet keyboard vamps and percussive effects that stab and flick ricocheting off pliant, bounding basslines." Alex Macpherson of The Guardian commented that "Convivial is an astonishingly intimate listen, similar in feel to Junior Boys' Last Exit or Björk's Vespertine." He added, "Though each of Convivial's nine tracks unfolds gradually - only one clocks in at under six minutes - not one moment is wasted."

=== Accolades ===
Year-end lists for Convivial
Publication	List	Rank	Ref.
AllMusic	Favorite Electronic Albums of 2008	—	
Cokemachineglow	Top 50 Albums 2008	48	

== Track listing ==
Convivial track listing
No.	Title	Length
1.	"Have You Ever" (featuring Cassy)	8:03
2.	"Love You All" (featuring Sascha Ring)	7:11
3.	"If I Can't" (featuring Jake Shears)	7:49
4.	"Nothing Goes Away" (featuring Sue Cie and Johanna Iivanainen)	6:49
5.	"Robert's Reason" (featuring Robert Owens)	6:49
6.	"Slow Dying Places" (featuring Johanna Iivanainen)	8:52
7.	"Sleep Tonight" (featuring Johanna Iivanainen)	7:37
8.	"Gets Along Fine" (featuring Chubbs)	8:09
9.	"Lonely Music Co." (featuring Johanna Iivanainen)	5:28
Total length:		66:47

== Personnel ==
Credits adapted from liner notes.

- Sasu Ripatti – music, vocal production, mixing
- Slang – design
