= Sounding Lines =

Studio album by Moritz von Oswald Trio
- Released: 9 June 2015
- Genre: Electronic
- Length: 49:03
- Label: Honest Jon's
- Producer: Moritz von Oswald; Max Loderbauer

Moritz von Oswald Trio chronology
Fetch (2012)	Sounding Lines (2015)	Transport (2016)

Sounding Lines is the fourth studio album by Moritz von Oswald Trio. It was released via Honest Jon's on 9 June 2015. It is the group's first album after Vladislav Delay was replaced by Tony Allen.

== Critical reception ==
Professional ratings
Aggregate scores
Source	Rating
Metacritic	57/100
Review scores
Source	Rating
AllMusic	3/5 stars
Pitchfork	6.3/10
Resident Advisor	3.0/5
Spin	7/10

At Metacritic, which assigns a weighted average score out of 100 to reviews from mainstream critics, the album received an average score of 57, based on 5 reviews, indicating "mixed or average reviews".

Miles Raymer of Pitchfork gave the album a 6.3 out of 10, commenting that "Their playing has a loose, improvisatory feel but a strong sense of purpose." He added, "The three showcase a strong and singular shared vision, and in the moments where the music pulls you in deep enough to share it with them, it’s a beautiful thing." Andy Kellman of AllMusic gave the album 3 out of 5 stars, writing, "Certain stretches of Sounding Lines are so trimmed and sedate that they're less diverting than anything on the previous Trio releases."

== Track listing ==
No.	Title	Length
1.	"1"	11:17
2.	"2"	6:01
3.	"3"	0:40
4.	"4"	6:04
5.	"5 (Spectre)"	4:22
6.	"6"	9:20
7.	"7"	7:41
8.	"8"	6:55

== Personnel ==
Credits adapted from liner notes.

- Moritz von Oswald – production, synthesizer, electronics, sequencing
- Max Loderbauer – production, synthesizer
- Tony Allen – drums
- Ingo Krauss – engineering
- Ricardo Villalobos – mixing
- Marc Brandenburg – artwork
