= The Coldest Season =

Studio album by Deepchord Presents Echospace
- Released: August 20, 2007
- Genre: Dub techno, ambient
- Length: 79:47
- Label: Modern Love
- Producer: Rod Modell, Stephen Hitchell

Professional ratings
Review scores
Source	Rating
AllMusic	4.5/5 stars
Hot Press	9/10
PopMatters	1/10 stars
Resident Advisor	5/5 stars
Stylus Magazine	A

The Coldest Season is a 2007 album by dub techno duo Echospace (credited on the album as Deepchord Presents Echospace) which is composed of Rod Modell (Deepchord) and Stephen Hitchell. The Coldest Season was recorded using old analog equipment. The album is very atmospheric with ambient and techno influences. It was named the 49th best album of the decade by Resident Advisor.

== Track listing ==
No.	Title	Length
1.	"First Point of Aries"	6:38
2.	"Abraxas"	5:04
3.	"Ocean of Emptiness"	11:39
4.	"Aequinoxium"	13:31
5.	"Celestialis"	8:12
6.	"Sunset"	10:45
7.	"Elysian"	12:31
8.	"Winter in Seney"	6:02
9.	"Empyrean"	5:25
