= Black Artist Database =

Online crowdsourced database

- Formerly: Black Bandcamp
- Founded: June 4th 2020
- Website: https://blackartistdatabase.co/#/

Black Artist Database (formerly known as Black Bandcamp) is an online crowdsourced database and community-based music platform, maintained by contributions from volunteers and the public.

== History ==
On June 4, 2020, in response to the murder of George Floyd and "structural mistreatment of Black folk in the underground electronic industry", co-founder Niks Delanancy and a few friends made an open-source Google Sheet named Black Bandcamp, highlighting Black music producers and artists for people to support. After encouraging people to contribute and sharing the link to the spreadsheet online, what began as a spreadsheet of 30 names grew overnight to over 400, and expanded to include names of Black-owned record labels, singers, instrumentalists and producers from all around the world.

== Rebrand ==
One year after creation, Black Bandcamp rebranded as Black Artist Database with a new website that include news features, as well as interviews and DJ mixes. They also launched the Creative Database, which allows users to discover Black creative professionals working in fields such as journalism, design, photography, and more.

With the rebranding, Black Artist Database further expanded their team and the scope of their work, also beginning to organise their own music events and Ableton-partnered production workshops featuring international artists such as AceMo and Kessler.
