= Anima (Vladislav Delay album) =

Studio album by Vladislav Delay
- Released: 23 January 2001
- Genre: Dub; musique concrète; ambient
- Length: 62:02
- Label: Mille Plateaux
- Producer: Vladislav Delay

Vladislav Delay chronology
Multila (2000)	Anima (2001)	Naima (2002)

Anima is a studio album by Finnish record producer Sasu Ripatti under the name Vladislav Delay. It was released on 23 January 2001, through Mille Plateaux.

== Background ==
Anima consists of a single 62-minute track. The album was created in a few days. It marked the first time that Vladislav Delay used a DAW within his production process.

Anima was originally released on 23 January 2001, through Mille Plateaux. It was reissued in 2008 through Huume, and in 2022 through Keplar. The reissue editions include a ten-minute version of the piece as a bonus track.

Vladislav Delay later released Naima (2002) through Staubgold. It contains his live performance based on Anima's source material, with AGF providing vocals.

== Critical reception ==
Professional ratings
Review scores
Source	Rating
AllMusic	3/5 stars
Now	3/5
PopMatters	5/10

Jason Birchmeier of AllMusic stated, "An hour-long composition, Anima sprawls for what feels like a short eternity, drawing you deep into its aquatic realm of random happenings and lapping dub basslines." Nick Holmes of Exclaim! commented that "Folks have compared him to Pole and Kit Clayton, but (much) longer loops, smoother sounds and a less songlike approach reminded me most of the more patient and forgiving '70s approach."

In 2008, Alan Ranta of PopMatters stated, "As ever, the hour-long album title track rambles across abstract analog soundscapes with lagging dub beats occasionally fluttering past." He added, "Anima is the perfect sketchy comedown album, and you don't want to remember every second of that." In 2020, Philip Sherburne of Pitchfork stated, "If you squint, you can see Ripatti's past as a jazz drummer in the skittering accents of the percussion, and there are moments of real beauty in the ebb and flow of complementary synth tones."

== Track listing ==
All tracks are written by Sasu Ripatti.

Anima track listing
No.	Title	Length
1.	"Anima"	62:02

2008 reissue edition bonus track
No.	Title	Length
2.	"Anima (Version)"	10:11

2022 reissue edition
No.	Title	Length
1.	"Anima A"	20:20
2.	"Anima B"	19:44
3.	"Anima C"	20:03
4.	"Anima D"	2:10
5.	"Anima (Version)"	10:11

== Personnel ==
Credits adapted from liner notes.

- Sasu Ripatti – production, recording
- Rashad Becker – mastering
- Kassian Troyer – remastering (2022 edition)
- Marc Hohmann – art direction, design
