= Rakka (album) =

Studio album by Vladislav Delay
- Released: 27 February 2020
- Genre: Electronic
- Length: 44:59
- Label: Cosmo Rhythmatic
- Producer: Sasu Ripatti

Vladislav Delay chronology
Visa (2014)	Rakka (2020)	Rakka II (2021)

Rakka is a studio album by Finnish record producer Sasu Ripatti under the pseudonym Vladislav Delay. It was released on 27 February 2020 through Cosmo Rhythmatic. It received generally favorable reviews from critics.

== Background ==
Sasu Ripatti, also known as Vladislav Delay, is a Finnish record producer. In 2008, he moved from Berlin, Germany, to Hailuoto, Finland. Rakka is his first solo studio album since Visa (2014). After Visa, he sold most of his hardware. He created Rakka primarily on a computer. The album's title comes from "a distinctly Arctic landform, one with no direct translation in English: vast fields of rocks, where little grows." An official teaser video was released on 16 January 2020. The album was released on 27 February 2020 through Cosmo Rhythmatic.

A follow-up album, Rakka II, was released in 2021.

== Critical reception ==
Professional ratings
Aggregate scores
Source	Rating
Metacritic	78/100
Review scores
Source	Rating
AllMusic	4.5/5 stars
The Guardian	3/5 stars
Pitchfork	8.0/10
PopMatters	6/10

According to the review aggregator Metacritic, Rakka received "generally favorable reviews" based on a weighted average score of 78 out of 100 from 7 critic scores.

Paul Simpson of AllMusic stated, "Rakka is unexpectedly harsh and brutal, indeed the polar opposite of his accessible house tracks as Luomo." Ray Philp of Resident Advisor wrote, "Ultimately, Rakka is the sound of a revered producer starting from scratch." He added, "While a clearing of the cobwebs is liberating for the artist, the resulting record is a tough sell for its audience, even one as dedicated as Vladislav Delay's." Daniel Bromfield of PopMatters commented that "Rakka contains some of Ripatti's most thrilling and unpredictable sound design, but taken in one sitting, it's hard to know what to do with it."

=== Accolades ===
Year-end lists for Rakka
Publication	List	Rank	Ref.
AllMusic	AllMusic Best of 2020	—	
AllMusic	Favorite Electronic Albums	—	

== Track listing ==
All tracks are written by Sasu Ripatti.

Rakka track listing
No.	Title	Length
1.	"Rakka"	7:25
2.	"Raajat"	8:35
3.	"Rakkine"	6:16
4.	"Raakile"	3:37
5.	"Rampa"	7:46
6.	"Raataja"	5:56
7.	"Rasite"	5:20
Total length:		44:59

== Personnel ==
Credits adapted from liner notes.

- Sasu Ripatti – production
- LCR – artwork
- Pasquale Ascione – graphic layout, type
