= Naima (Vladislav Delay album) =

Studio album by Vladislav Delay
- Released: June 1, 2002
- Genre: Ambient, spoken word, incidental music
- Length: 42:08
- Label: Mille Plateaux
- Producer: Vladislav Delay

Vladislav Delay chronology
Anima (2001)	Naima (2002)	Demo(n) Tracks (2004)

Professional ratings
Review scores
Source	Rating
Allmusic	2.5/5 stars

Naima is the fifth album by Finnish producer Sasu Ripatti under the name Vladislav Delay.

It is an edit of his previous album Anima used to transform a park at the 2001 Ars Electronica festival.

Antye Greie (credited as "Girlfriend") appears on vocals.

== Track listing ==
1. "Anima" (42:08)
