= Moritz von Oswald =

German record producer and percussionist (born 1962)

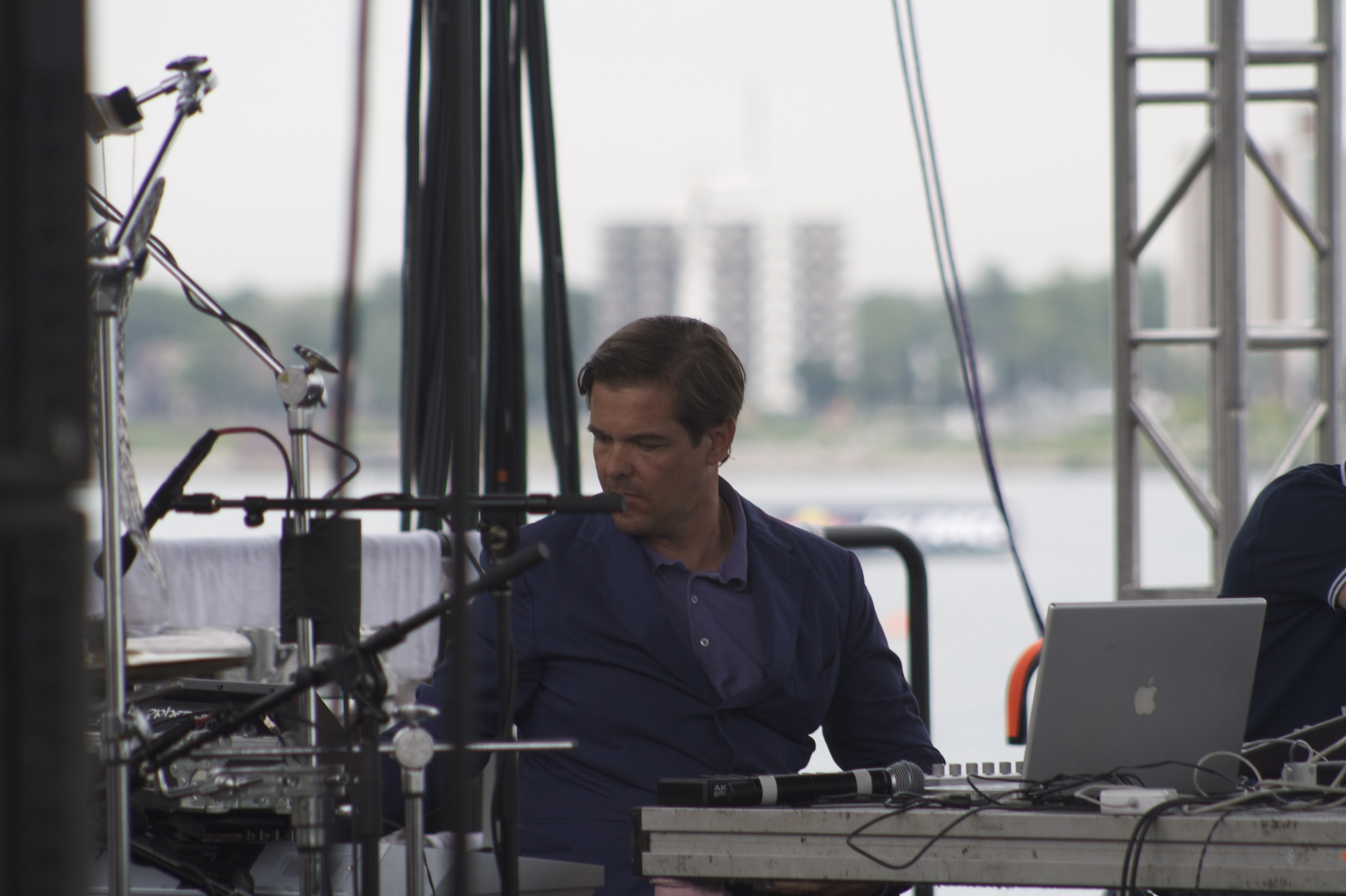
- Von Oswald performing live in 2010

Background information
- Born: 1962 (age 63–64); Hamburg, Germany
- Genre: Dub techno
- Occupations: Record producer; percussionist
- Years active: 1980s–present
- Labels: Basic Channel; Chain Reaction; Tresor

Moritz von Oswald (born 1962) is a German record producer and percussionist from Hamburg and based in Berlin. He is a co-founder of the production duo and record label Basic Channel. He has collaborated with Juan Atkins, Carl Craig, and Nils Petter Molvær. He also leads the Moritz von Oswald Trio, which has featured musicians such as Vladislav Delay, Tony Allen, and Laurel Halo. The Stranger called him "one of the master architects of dub techno".

== Early life ==
Von Oswald was born in 1962 in Hamburg, Germany. He is a member of the House of Bismarck and a great-great-grandson of Otto von Bismarck. His parents were Countess Mari Ann von Bismarck-Schönhausen and the Hamburg merchant Egbert von Oswald. He studied orchestral percussion at the Hochschule für Musik und Theater Hamburg.

== Career ==
In the 1980s, von Oswald was the percussionist for the German new wave band Palais Schaumburg. After that, he moved to Berlin and began creating electronic music. He worked as an in-house producer for the Berlin record label Tresor. In the early 1990s, he released collaborative projects with fellow Palais Schaumburg member Thomas Fehlmann under the monikers 2MB and 3MB.

He co-founded the record label Basic Channel with Mark Ernestus in 1993. The duo's works have been released under numerous monikers such as Basic Channel and Rhythm & Sound.

He has formed the Moritz von Oswald Trio along with Max Loderbauer and Vladislav Delay. In 2009, the trio released Vertical Ascent. It was followed by Live in New York (2010), Horizontal Structures (2011), and Fetch (2012). Subsequently, Vladislav Delay was replaced by Tony Allen. The trio released Sounding Lines in 2015.

He is also one half of the duo Borderland along with Juan Atkins. The duo released Borderland in 2013 and Transport in 2016.

== Discography ==
=== Studio albums ===
- 3MB Featuring Magic Juan Atkins (1992) (with Thomas Fehlmann and Juan Atkins, as 3MB Featuring Magic Juan Atkins)
- 3MB Featuring Eddie Flashin Fowlkes (1992) (with Thomas Fehlmann and Eddie Fowlkes, as 3MB Featuring Eddie Flashin Fowlkes)
- Technosoul (1993) (with Thomas Fehlmann and Eddie Fowlkes, as 3MB Featuring Eddie Flashin Fowlkes)
- Recomposed (2008) (with Carl Craig)
- Vertical Ascent (2009) (with Max Loderbauer and Vladislav Delay, as Moritz von Oswald Trio)
- Horizontal Structures (2011) (with Max Loderbauer and Vladislav Delay, as Moritz von Oswald Trio)
- Fetch (2012) (with Max Loderbauer and Vladislav Delay, as Moritz von Oswald Trio)
- Borderland (2013) (with Juan Atkins, as Borderland)
- 1/1 (2013) (with Nils Petter Molvær)
- Sounding Lines (2015) (with Max Loderbauer and Tony Allen, as Moritz von Oswald Trio)
- Transport (2016) (with Juan Atkins, as Borderland)
- Moritz von Oswald & Ordo Sakhna (2017) (with Ordo Sakhna)

=== Live albums ===
- Live in New York (2010) (with Max Loderbauer and Vladislav Delay, as Moritz von Oswald Trio)
