= Fluxion (disambiguation) =

A fluxion is a mathematical concept, first formulated by Isaac Newton.

Fluxion may also refer to:

- Newton's method for solving an equation
- Fluxion (electronic musician), real name Konstantinos Soublis
- Fluxion (album), the Ocean Collective's first LP

== See also ==
- Fluxon, quantum of electromagnetic flux
