= Biokinetics =

Biokinetics may refer to:

== Science ==
- Pharmacokinetics, the study of the metabolism and transport of drugs through the body
- Toxicokinetics, the study of the metabolism and transport of toxins through the body
- Biomechanics, the study of physical motions of the body

== Music ==
- Biokinetics (Porter Ricks album)
