= Deepchord =

American electronic musician

- Also known as: Deepchord; A601-2; CV; Delayvarience; Global Systems Silently Moving; Imax
- Born: Roderick Julian Modell; July 22, 1969 (age 57); Detroit, Michigan, US
- Genres: Ambient; techno; dub techno; ambient techno; minimal techno
- Instruments: Sampler; synthesizer; drum machine
- Years active: 2000–present
- Labels: Soma Quality Records; Astral Industries; DeepChord; Hierophant Records; Octal; Modern Love; Cache Records; AvantRoots; Vibrant Music; Echospace
- Members: Roderick Modell
- Past members: Mike Schommer

Roderick Julian Modell (commonly goes by Rod Modell) is an American electronic music producer, DJ and musician from Port Huron, Michigan, known professionally as Deepchord (pronunciation: [diːpkɔːrd]; sometimes stylized as DeepChord).

Modell was born on July 22, 1969, in Detroit, Michigan. He worked with Mike Schommer to produce music under the Deepchord moniker as well as co-founded an eponymous record label in Detroit during the mid-1990s. However, currently the project name of Deepchord represents only Modell, who is using a number of aliases besides. The musical style of Deepchord is similar to both the minimal Berlin sound of artists like Basic Channel and the techno tradition of Detroit.

Modell is well known for his collaboration with Stephen Hitchell (Soultek) as Echospace or cv313. In 2007, they released the album The Coldest Season on the record label Modern Love. Modell has also performed live with Hitchell as Echospace.

Modell has also collaborated with fellow Detroit native Mike Huckaby.

== Selected discography ==
Albums/EPs

- 2000: DeepChord 01-06 as Deepchord
- 2003: Kettle Point EP as Rod Modell (Echocord)
- 2004: Illuminati Audio Science with Kevin Hanton (Silentes)
- 2007: The Coldest Season as Deepchord Presents Echospace
- 2007: Vantage Isle as Deepchord (echospace [detroit])
- 2007: Incense & Black Light as Rod Modell (Plop)
- 2007: Plays Michael Mantra (Silentes)
- 2010: Liumin as Deepchord Presents Echospace
- 2011: Hash-Bar Loops as Deepchord (Soma)
- 2012: Silent World as Deepchord Presents Echospace (Echospace)
- 2012: Sommer as Deepchord (Soma)
- 2014: Yagya and Deepchord: Redesigns Remixes of ambient tracks by Yagya (Subwax)
- 2014: Lanterns (Astral Industries)
- 2015: Ultraviolet Music (Soma)
- 2017: Auratones (Soma)
- 2022: Functional Design (Soma)

Singles

- 2001: "dc10" (Deepchord)
- 2001: "dc11" (Deepchord)
- 2001: "dc12" (Deepchord)
- 2001: "dc13" (Deepchord)
- 2001: "dc14" (Deepchord)
- 2003: "dc16" (Deepchord)
- 2008: "The Detroit Remixes" with Mike Huckaby (Cache Records)
- 2011: "Hash-Bar Remnants (Part 1)" (Soma)
- 2011: "Hash-Bar Remnants (Part 2)" (Soma)
- 2012: "The Tonality of Night" (Soma)
- 2013: "Prana/Tantra" (Soma)
- 2014: "Luxury" (Soma)
- 2018: "Immersions" (Astral Industries)

Remixes

- 2007: Convextion - "Miranda"
- 2007: Model 500 - "Starlight"
- 2008: Shocking Pinks - "Dressed to Please"
- 2016: Peter Michael Hamel - Colours of Time
