= Kvadrat (film) =

2013 film directed by Anatoly Ivanov

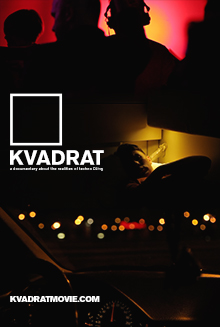
- One-sheet film poster
- Directed by: Anatoly Ivanov
- Written by: Anatoly Ivanov
- Produced by: Yury Rysev; Anatoly Ivanov
- Starring: Andrey Pushkarev
- Cinematography: Anatoly Ivanov
- Edited by: Anatoly Ivanov
- Music by: various artists
- Release date: October 17, 2013
- Running time: 107 minutes
- Countries: France; Russia
- Languages: English, Russian
- Budget: €100 000

Kvadrat is a 2013 documentary feature film written, co-produced, and directed by Anatoly Ivanov. The film explores the realities of techno DJing, in particular the experiences of Russian DJ Andrey Pushkarev. Filmed as a hybrid between a road-movie and a music video, Kvadrat depicts the festive atmosphere of techno night clubs, and reveals aspects of this profession less commonly portrayed. Shot in Switzerland, France, Hungary, Romania and Russia, the film omits the typical documentary elements: there are no interviews, no explanatory voice-over, facts or data is provided. It gives priority to the soundtrack of techno music, leaving the detailed interpretation to the viewer.

== Plot ==
DJ Andrey Pushkarev wakes up in his Moscow apartment, packs his vinyl records into a rolling bag and leaves for Domodedovo airport, to fly to Zurich. Upon arriving, he is greeted by the promoter of the Supermarket club. After falling asleep in the hotel, he is suddenly awakened by the alarm, resulting in a prolonged moment of disorientation. This disorientation, indicative of severe sleep deprivation, is visually emphasized as he stares blankly into the camera, capturing the exhaustion and mental fatigue inherent in the DJing profession. He finally gathers his wits, dresses up, and leaves for the job in the middle of the night. After finishing his DJ set, he leaves the club to take the train to Geneva. While en route, instead of admiring the Alpine scenery, he sleeps.

After a short visit to a friend in Geneva (whether male or female is not shown), he takes the plane back to Moscow. He thus completes the first "story loop", repeated with slight variations throughout the entire film, a metaphor on techno music loops.

In his flat in Moscow, after quickly replying to booking requests on Skype, he goes through his huge collection of vinyl techno records to prepare his next performances. A quick shave and he leaves to take a taxi for the railway station, where he boards a train for Saint Petersburg.

Once in Saint Petersburg, he waits at a friend's flat, while listening to tracks on Beatport. After nightfall, he is driven to Barakobamabar, where he plays a set. At dawn, his friends accompany him to the metro, one of them barely walking from too much drink. Pushkarev then takes the metro back to the train station, using a short-cut through Saint Petersburg down-town.

Back in Moscow, and back to the beginning of the story loop, he visits his friends and while drinking tea, debates his dream of playing techno during the day and bringing the techno club industry more in line with a healthy lifestyle.

After a short metro trip, he plays in a Moscow club Mir, after which he flies out to Geneva, again. There, he takes the same train as previously, looping in the other direction, to Olten via Bern. Greeted by the club promoter, he goes directly to the local club Terminus, where technical problems hamper his performance. The Technics SL-1210 turntable refuses to switch the playback speed from 45 rpm to 33 rpm. Later, a club technician bumps his elbow into the tonearm. Tired, Pushkarev takes a cab to the hotel, where he checks his in-coming booking requests on the notebook computer.

In the morning, he takes the train to Lausanne where he changes for a TGV to Paris. After a performance at the 4 Éléments bar, he continues his trip to the SWISS hub in Zurich, where he boards a flight to Budapest.

The local crew transport him from Budapest to Kecel, where he plays at the club Korona to a massive audience. Asleep in the car back to Budapest, he misses the decorated down-town and gets only a couple of hours to repack at the hotel, before leaving again for the airport, restarting the loop.

He flies back to the Zurich hub, where he changes for a flight to Bucharest.

Picked-up at the airport, he is driven to Craiova, where he plays at club Krypton without any rest.

The next day, he sleeps in the car during the 2012 European cold wave, to then arrive in Cluj-Napoca’s club Midi, where he plays a high-energy DJ set. The crowd responds enthusiastically as the music drives the atmosphere to a peak, to then cut to the DJ waking up in the same battered BMW driving again through winter.

Finally, he arrives at the seaside, stares at the waves and the sunset and silently walks away, leaving his bag of vinyls on the beach.

== Production ==
Because of budget restrictions, Anatoly Ivanov took on multiple roles, including writer, co-producer, director, cinematographer, editor, and sound engineer.

=== Development ===
Anatoly Ivanov formed an idea for Kvadrat after completing an impromptu 30-minute short in Cantonese in February 2011 about a private Hong Kong martial arts event. He suggested to shoot a realistic DJing documentary to Andrey Pushkarev, when the two met in the director's Paris flat shortly afterwards.

Anatoly Ivanov teamed up with Yury Rysev to privately finance the project, initially miscalculating the total required by a factor of 5. A stringent cost-cutting approach enabled the feature to be produced across 5 countries on a limited budget of €100 000. The project was made possible by the dedication of the crew, who volunteered their time and effort, working for several years without financial compensation.

The director discussed his producer debut mistakes and the measures implemented during various Q&A sessions, including at the Moscow Center of Documentary Film and with students at the Moscow Film School.

=== Locations ===
Kvadrat was filmed exclusively on location in:

- Switzerland
  - Zurich
  - Geneva
  - Olten
- France
  - Paris
  - Marseille
- Hungary
  - Budapest
  - Kecel
- Romania
  - Bucharest
  - Craiova
  - Cluj-Napoca
- Russia
  - Moscow
  - Saint Petersburg
  - Izhevsk, Udmurtia
  - Votkinsk, Udmurtia
  - Stepanovo, Udmurtia

And during regular flights by SWISS and Izhavia, train journeys by SBB CFF FFS, RZD, and on public transport in Geneva's TPG, Saint Petersburg Metro and Moscow Metro.

=== Cinematography ===
Principal photography began on August 27, 2011, ended on July 16, 2012, and lasted 55 days (if counting the days when the camera was rolling).

The film was shot in the spherical 1080p HD format using a pair of Canon 1D mark IV cameras and just two Canon still-photography lenses.

Anatoly Ivanov was the only crew to shoot video and record sound for the film, carrying all the cinema equipment on himself. Therefore, he chose not to use dollies, cranes, jibs, steadicams, tripods, sliders or car mounts, and filmed Kvadrat exclusively with a handheld rig. No additional lighting was used.

=== Editing and post-production ===
Editing in Final Cut Pro X, post-production started immediately after the wrap of principal photography. It took 1 year in Geneva and was delayed by technical problems, such as frame-by-frame manual removal of hot pixels on the footage from the cameras and inadequate computer hardware (a 2011 MacBook Pro and a pair of Sony MDR7506 headphones).

=== Music ===
The film features 35 tracks played by DJ Pushkarev, representing various subgenres of techno music, ranging from deep house to dub techno through minimal techno and electro:

1. "Abyss" by Manoo – Deeply Rooted House, 2008
2. "Direct" by Kris Wadsworth – NRK Sound Division, 2009
3. "La Grippe (Helly Larson Remix)" by George Soliis – Wasabi, 2011
4. "Air" by Havantepe – Styrax Leaves, 2007
5. "Mauna Loa" by Mick Rubin – Musik Gewinnt Freunde, 2009
6. "Soul Sounds (Freestyle Man Original Dope Remix)" by Sasse – Moodmusic, 2005
7. "Tammer (David Duriez Remix From Da Vault)" by Phonogenic – 20:20 Vision, 2000
8. "Track B1" by Slowhouse Two – Slowhouse Recordings, 2008
9. "Post" by Claro Intelecto – Modern Love, 2011
10. "Acid Face" by Scott Findley – Iron Box Music, 2003
11. "Warriors" by Two Armadillos – Secretsundaze Music, 2007
12. "Grand Theft Vinyl (JV Mix)" by Green Thumb vs JV – So Sound Recordings, 2004
13. "Tobacco (Alveol Mix)" by Kiano Below Bangkok – Only Good Shit Records, 2011
14. "When The Dark Calls" by Pop Out and Play – Alola, 2001
15. "Circular Motion (Vivid)" by Christian Linder – Phono Elements, 2002
16. "Blacktro (Demo 1)" by Jerome Sydenham and Joe Claussell – UK Promotions, 2007
17. "Green Man" by Mr. Bizz – Deepindub.org, 2008
18. "Tahiti" by Ben Rourke – Stuga Musik, 2011
19. "Willpower" by Joshua Collins – Prolekult, 2002
20. "Lullaby For Rastko (Herb LF Remix)" by Petkovski – Farside, 2011
21. "Agape Dub" by Luke Hess – Modelisme Records, 2009
22. "Glacial Valley" by Makam – Pariter, 2011
23. "The Time" by Vizar – Jato Unit Analog, 2011
24. "Libido" by Sean Palm and Charlie Mo – Railyard Recordings, 2008
25. "Ahck (Jichael Mackson Remix)" by Minilogue – Wir, 2007
26. "Altered State (Artificial Remix)" by Jason Vasilas – Tangent Beats, 2004
27. "Modern Times (Dub Mix)" by Hatikvah – Baalsaal, 2009
28. "That Day (Loudeast Black Label Remix)" by DJ Grobas – Thrasher Home Recordings, 2004
29. "The Hills (John Selway Dub)" by Filippo Mancinelli and Allen May – Darkroom Dubs, 2011
30. "Running Man" by Petar Dundov – Music Man Records, 2007
31. "Ice" by Monolake – Imbalance Computer Music, 2000
32. "Lucky Punch" by Peter Dildo – Trackdown Records, 2006
33. "Live Jam 1" by Rhauder – Polymorph, 2011
34. "Can U Hear Shapes?" by Pop Out and Play – Alola, 2001
35. "Be No-One" by Charles Webster – Statra Recordings, 2001

== Themes ==
Besides the obvious facade of DJ work seen in a nightclub, Kvadrat explores the lesser-known themes of DJ travel, fatigue, sleep deprivation, self-destruction, absurdity, loneliness, purpose of art and stereotypes of the artist. Unlike in mainstream films such as Berlin Calling or Basquiat, these topics are presented from a viewpoint of a normal, slightly overweight and out-of-shape individual, who does not compensate nor suffer from substance abuse and does his job devoid of female attention.

== Genre ==
Anatoly Ivanov combined elements of a road movie and a music video, creating a modern techno musical with minimal dialogue. He intentionally applied the aesthetics of fiction films to non-fiction footage. By avoiding documentary clichés, Ivanov sought to create a third category that lies between fiction and documentary genres.

In Kvadrat, fiction techniques such as multiple takes and separate, non-synced audio-video recording are employed. Complex VFX, sound design ( ADR, foley...) are used alongside exhibition, metaphors, and symbolism to convey ideas, evoke emotions, and pose questions implicitly. This approach contrasts with traditional documentary methods, which often rely on exposition, staged interviews, and explanatory voice-over to communicate answers explicitly. However, the film retains single video takes for more complex scenes, such as Airbus passenger aircraft landings and crowd dancing in nightclubs.

== Release ==
The film was quietly released in 720p quality on Vimeo on October 17, 2013, with English, French and Russian subtitles, accumulating 53 000 plays (as of September 2014, not to be confused with loads). It premiered in cinema as 2K DCP during the Kommt Zusammen festival in Rostock, Germany, on April 18, 2014.

The film was screened multiple times during the 2016 edition of the Peacock Society Festival in Paris, France. The screening was followed by a Q&A session and a debate on DJ health and family life, featuring DJ Simo Cell (Simon AUSSEL) and DJ Busy P (Pierre WINTER, manager of Daft Punk from 1996 to early 2008 and current Ed Banger Records manager). The discussion was moderated by Trax Magazine's Patrick THÉVENIN and Arnaud WYART.

Unifrance, an organization dedicated to promoting French films abroad, managed by the Centre national du cinéma et de l'image animée, partnered with the L'Institut Français to help relaunch a Russian distribution campaign in cinemas.

The film premiered in April 2019 at the Moscow Center of Documentary Film, the only cinema in Russia exclusively dedicated to documentaries since 2013. The screening included a Q&A session with the film's protagonist and crew, moderated by Kommersant journalist and film critic Yulia Shagelman. During the session, the director noted that Russia was the most challenging and delay-prone country to obtain a specific film distribution certificate, which had to be signed personally by the Deputy Minister of Culture of the Russian Federation. Following a fully-booked event, the film was shown again in response to audience demand and continued its theatrical distribution.

The film was also screened at the Moscow Film School, followed by a Q&A between the students and the director, moderated by TedX cinema presenter, film critic, and VGIK professor Vsevolod Korshunov on April 18, 2019. They discussed various aspects of the film, including its production, financing, differences between fiction and documentary filmmaking, the typology of art (cathartic and non-cathartic), honesty in documentary cinema, and the significance of the techno DJ profession.

The Moscow Center of Documentary Film was subsequently closed at the start of the Russian invasion of Ukraine, its team disbanded, and further screenings were cancelled due to force majeure. The film's main character, DJ Pushkarev, and the filmmakers left Russia, as did the majority of the Russian film industry and foreign cultural organizations.

== Reception ==
The public and press were surprised by a stealthy release without any marketing campaign.

Reviewers noted the film's aesthetic, atmospheric, musical and meditative qualities, as well as its realistic approach, the decision to forego traditional interviews and adopt innovative editing. However, the film has also drawn criticism from viewers for its length, bleak tone, and unconventional structure, which lacks traditional character development. This polarized response aligns with critic Vsevolod Korshunov's analysis, who described Kvadrat as a play on ugly feelings, a concept by Sianne Ngai that has resonated negatively with certain audiences.

Iskusstvo Kino — established in 1931 and one of Europe's earliest magazines specializing in film theory and review, alongside the British magazine Sight & Sound and the French magazine Cahiers du Cinéma, published a positive review of Kvadrat in its May/June 2019 printed and online issue. Evgeny Maisel noted the peculiar dilemma of "monotony and isolation" in the DJ's profession, where the protagonist remains "detached from the joy he provides", trapped in a repetitive cycle of travel and work, all captured through Ivanov's equally self-restrained minimalism. In 2022, during the ongoing Russian invasion of Ukraine, the magazine's editor-in-chief, Anton Dolin, was declared a foreign agent due to his political dissent and fled the country. Iskusstvo Kino ceased publication in May 2023.

== See also ==
- Speaking in Code — an American documentary film about techno artists Modeselektor, Wighnomy Brothers, Philip Sherburne, Monolake and David Day
- Berlin Calling — a German fiction film about DJ and composer Ickarus (Paul Kalkbrenner) struggling with drug abuse
- Techno
- Dub techno
