= Biokinetics (Porter Ricks album) =

Studio album by Porter Ricks
- Released: 1996
- Genre: Dub techno, ambient techno
- Length: 1:10:19
- Label: Chain Reaction
- Producer: Thomas Köner, Andy Mellwig

Porter Ricks chronology
| Biokinetics (1996) | Porter Ricks (1997) |

Biokinetics is the first album by the electronic music duo of Thomas Köner and Andy Mellwig known as Porter Ricks. Issued in 1996, it was the first release on the Berlin-based Chain Reaction label. It is considered a classic within the dub techno genre.

== Background ==
The album is made up of both tracks written for the album and singles previously released on Chain Reaction (such as a 12" including the track 'Port Gentil') in the mid-1990s. The original CD was packaged in a metal box (a trend among Chain Reaction releases) which reportedly damaged the disc (a common complaint regarding Chain Reaction's CD issues). The 2012 reissue by Type Records utilized a more conventional jewel case packaging, with cover art consisting of a cropped 1889 photograph of a solar eclipse by Carleton Watkins. It was reissued again in 2021 by Mille Plateaux.

== Reception ==
Professional ratings
Aggregate scores
| Source | Rating |
|---|---|
| Metacritic | 93/100 |
Review scores
| Source | Rating |
| AllMusic | 5/5 stars |
| Pitchfork | 8.5/10 |
| Popmatters | 9/10 stars |
| Resident Advisor | 5/5 stars |

Biokinetics has been variously described as a realization of the Porter Ricks (and Chain Reaction) aesthetic and the duo's masterpiece. Jonny Mugwump of FACT wrote that the album is a product of a fertile experimental period in techno and an advancement of Koner's atmosphere-driven sound. Reviews typically note the bass and extensive palette of textures as key components of the album's unique sound, and often regard the bookending tracks "Port Gentil" and "Nautical Zone" as significant. Regarding the duo's experimental approach to techno, Will Lynch of Resident Advisor called the material "avant-garde music with a techno pulse". Pitchfork's Philip Sherburne called the album "a touchstone of experimental techno".

== Track listing ==
1. "Port Gentil" – 12:25
2. "Nautical Dub" – 5:48
3. "Biokinetics 1" – 5:20
4. "Biokinetics 2" – 8:29
5. "Port of Call" – 9:11
6. "Port of Nuba" – 8:04
7. "Nautical Nuba" – 8:56
8. "Nautical Zone" – 12:06
