= Fluxion (electronic musician) =

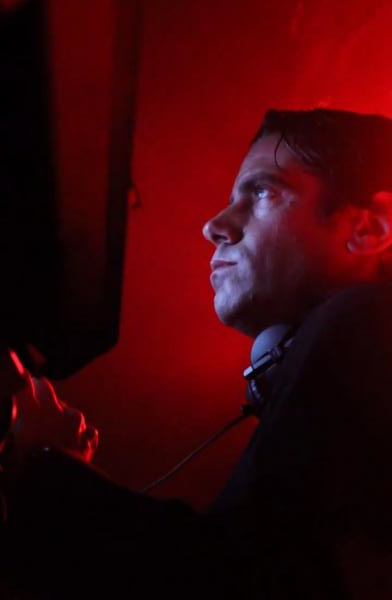
- Taken from a live show in Denmark 2010

Background information
- Born: Konstantinos Soublis; 26 October 1973 (age 52); Athens, Greece
- Genres: Electronic music, Dub techno, Experimental
- Occupation(s): Music writer, producer, remixer,
- Years active: 1998–present
- Labels: Chain Reaction, Vibrant Music, Resopal Schallware, Echocord
- Website: www.fluxionmusic.net

Fluxion is a pseudonym of Konstantinos Soublis (born 26 October 1973), a Greek musician and producer of electronic music.

== Background ==
His music includes different genres of electronic music, ambient, dub, experimental, techno, with sound design. His music has a characteristic of slowly evolving parts and contemplating elements which form lengthy musical pieces. His sounds are heavily processed to a point where the origin of a sound has little to do with the result. As Fluxion, he released EPs and albums for labels such as, Chain Reaction (a subsidiary of Basic Channel), Resopal Schallware, and Echocord. He created Vibrant Music in 1999, releasing his own music, but also from other artists.

== Early life ==
Born in Athens, Greece, he studied music technology in the U.K. between 1993 and 1996, where he came in touch with the processing of sounds and the music of John Cage, Philip Glass as well as futurism and music concrete. His first official recordings under the Fluxion moniker were a handful of ambient-inflected dub techno releases on the Chain Reaction label, much of which was compiled on two Vibrant Forms albums (issued in 1999 and 2000, respectively). He later released a full-length in 2001 titled Spaces, a conceptual album based on the perception of acoustics of different environments and how they can be reproduced artificially. He later released a few Ep's on his own imprint Vibrant Music. He went silent for a few years but resurfaced with a somewhat bolder approach on 2009-2010 releases through Resopal (Constant Limber) and Echocord (Perfused). His collaboration with Echocord continued with the Traces and Broadwalk Tales albums, while Type reissued the first Vibrant Forms collection. Fluxion collaborated with Subwax BCN in 2016; the label reissued Vibrant Forms II and released the newly recorded Vibrant Forms III. His earlier work is considered classic in the electronic music scene.

== Music and production techniques ==
On an interview in 2019, Konstantinos Soublis' mentioned, "My early influences were Philip Glass, Steve Reich, Wim Mertens, and composers that used repetition. This led me to work on repetitive forms with heavy use of effects processed live to create a spontaneous story. In addition to sound palette and form, there were the frequencies that, when interacting with other frequencies, gives you the perception of tones and counter melodies that don't exist as written context but rather happen as a result of all the elements interacting with each other. I always found this aural illusion fascinating." In 2018 Konstantinos Soublis released Ripple Effect, combining electronic and score music. On an interview he remarked, "With the Ripple Effect material, I worked differently than with other works. I started with a clear concept that I wanted to create a modern score combining electronic music with film music. I often write music that has nothing to do with the field of electronic music. But since an early age I've had a fascination with film music, as I always thought that being a genre in service of the motion picture, once experienced separately from the film medium, it defies the popular expected structure, found on most contemporary music. So when I started trying to create this dialogue between electronic and score, I suddenly started seeing a plot, imagining scenes of an imaginary story. Naturally, I followed this story to see where it led me, and this material came to life. I really enjoyed the process, as it is not very often that I see images so clearly in music".

== Discography ==
=== Albums ===
- Largo (Chain Reaction, 1999)
- Vibrant Forms (Chain Reaction, 1999)
- Bipolar Defect (Chain Reaction, 2000)
- Vibrant Forms II (Chain Reaction, 2000)
- Spaces ( Vibrant Music, 2001)
- Constant Limber (Resopal Schallware, 2009)
- Perfused (Echocord, 2010)
- Traces (Echocord, 2012)
- Broadwalk Tales (Echocord, 2014)
- Vibrant Forms III (Subwax, 2016)
- Ripple Effect (Vibrant Music, 2018)
- Perspectives (Vibrant Music, 2020)
- Parallel Moves (Vibrant Music, 2021)
- Haze (Vibrant Music, 2025)

=== Singles and EPs ===
- "Lark / Atlos" (Chain Reaction, 1998)
- "Prospect" (Chain Reaction, 1999)
- "Redundant" (Vibrant Music, 2001)
- "D-Teck" (Vibrant Music, 2004)
- "Breath Mode" (Resopal Schallware, 2009)
- "Inductance" (Echocord, 2009)
- "Perfuse" (Echocord, 2010)
- "Waves" (Echocord, 2010)
- "Traces 1 of 3" (Echocord, 2012)
- "Traces 2 of 3" (Echocord, 2012)
- "Traces 3 of 3" (Echocord, 2012)
- "Broadwalk Tales EP" (Echocord, 2014)
- "Outerside" (Subwax Bcn, 2016)
- "Vibrant Forms III 1 of 4" (Subwax Bcn, 2016)
- "Vibrant Forms III 2 of 4" (Subwax Bcn, 2016)
- "Vibrant Forms III 3 of 4" (Subwax Bcn, 2016)
- "Vibrant Forms III 4 of 4" (Subwax Bcn, 2016)
- "Strands" (Solar Phenomena, 2018)
- "Upsides & Sideways" (Echocord, 2018)
- Perspectives Versions" (Vibrant Music, 2020)

=== Collaborations ===
- "Accumulate Ep" as Transformations: Fluxion & Deepchord (Vibrant Music, 2018)
- "Bona Fide Ep" as Transformations: Fluxion & Deepchord (Vibrant Music, 2018)
- "Birth Lp" as Soluce K. Soublis & Savvas Ysatis (Vibrant Music, 2018)
