= Peacock Society =

Electronic music festival in Paris, France

The Peacock Society
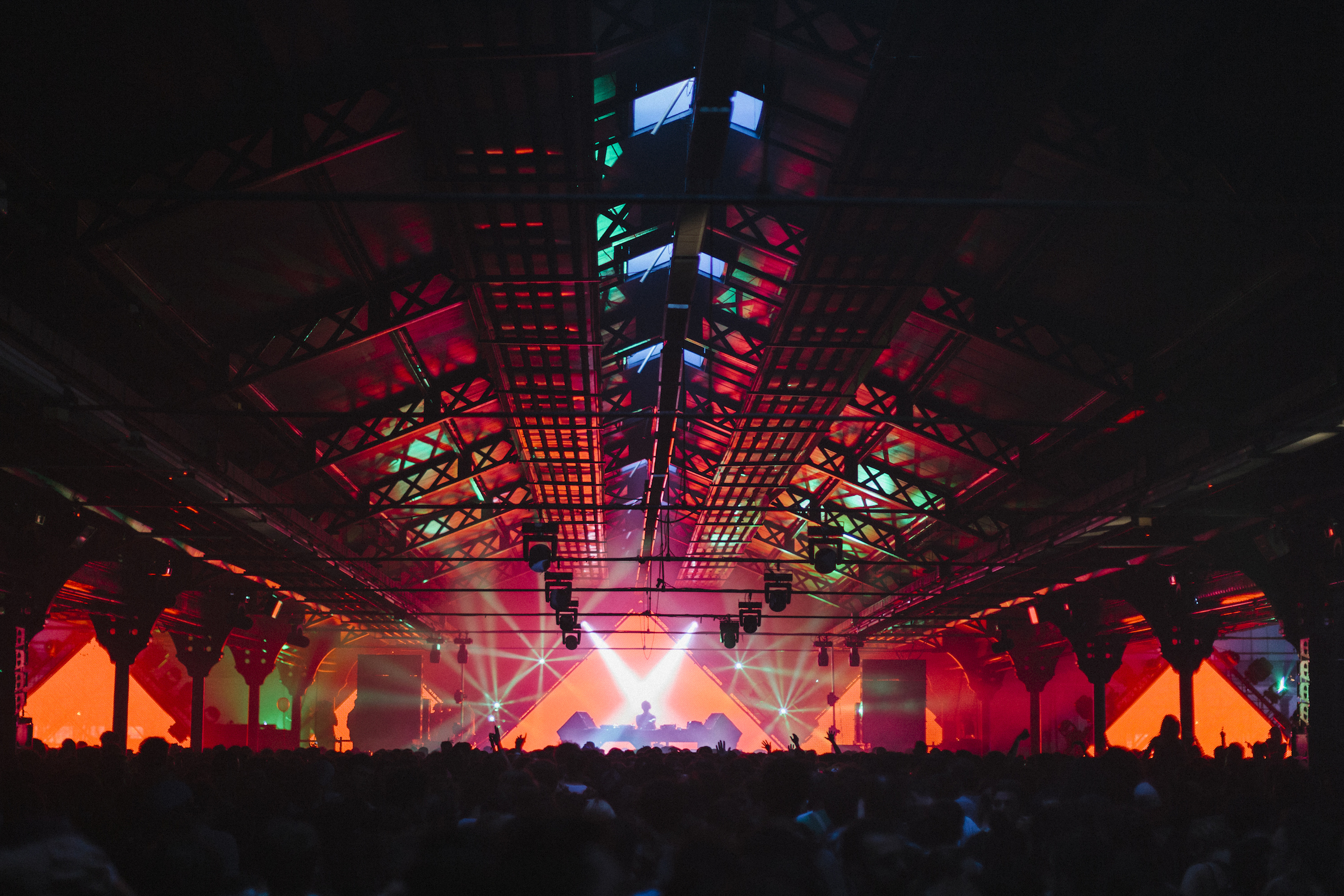
- The Peacock Society at Parc Floral de Paris
- Genre: Electronic music, Techno, House music, Visual Arts
- Locations: Paris, France
- Years active: 2013–present
- Founders: We Love Art, Savoir-Faire
- Website: Official website

Peacock Society is an annual electronic music festival held in Paris, France, known for its eclectic blend of techno, house, and experimental electronic music. Launched in 2013, it is a significant event in the European electronic music calendar, drawing approximately 25 000 music lovers from across the continent.

== History ==
The festival was founded in 2013 by the Paris-based event companies We Love Art and Savoir-Faire, both of which have strong ties to the electronic music scene in France. The Peacock Society was conceived as a celebration of electronic cultures, aiming to showcase both established and emerging talents from France and around the world. The festival takes place in the scenic Parc floral de Paris, a large botanical garden in the city's Bois de Vincennes district.

In 2020 and 2021, The Peacock Society festival skipped two years due to the COVID-19 pandemic.

In 2022, the festival was relocated from its usual venue at Parc Floral de Paris to Parc de Choisy in Créteil to continue its tradition of showcasing electronic music in a natural setting. After the pandemic, the festival returned to Parc Floral in 2024.

== Format and venue ==
The Peacock Society typically runs for two days each summer, offering a curated lineup that spans various sub-genres of electronic music. The festival is renowned for its immersive atmosphere, which is enhanced by cutting-edge visual installations and digital art displays. The main stages are set against the backdrop of the Parc Floral, offering festival-goers a unique blend of natural and urban aesthetics.

Some years, the organizers add a winter event as well.

In addition to music, the festival includes art installations, workshops, and debates, making it a comprehensive cultural experience. The organizers emphasize a strong connection to the local scene, with a significant portion of the lineup dedicated to French artists.

== Cultural impact ==
The Peacock Society has become a key event in Paris's cultural calendar, attracting not only music fans but also artists and creatives from various disciplines. Its commitment to showcasing a diverse range of electronic music has made it a crucial platform for both established and up-and-coming artists.

The festival's combination of music, visual arts, and cultural activities reflects a broader trend in the festival scene, where events are increasingly becoming immersive, multidisciplinary experiences.

== Notable musical performances ==
Each year, The Peacock Society attracts a lineup of internationally acclaimed artists alongside local French talent. Some of the notable performers have included Carl Craig, Richie Hawtin, Laurent Garnier, Sven Väth, Charlotte de Witte, Dixon, and Ricardo Villalobos.

The 2019 edition, for instance, saw performances from Mount Kimbie and The Black Madonna, further solidifying the festival's reputation as a premier destination for electronic music enthusiasts.

=== 2013 ===
Selected performers:

- Richie Hawtin
- Ricardo Villalobos
- Clement Meyer & Tomas More
- DJ Koze
- Audion aka Matthew Dear

=== 2014 ===
Selected performers:

- Richie Hawtin
- DARKSIDE
- The Martinez Brothers
- Recondite
- Ron Morelli
- Cassius
- OMAR S
- Paul Kalkbrenner
- Makam

=== 2015 ===
Selected performers:

- Seth Troxler B2B Michael Mayer
- Laurent Garnier
- Traumer
- Margaret Dygas
- Loco Dice

=== 2016 ===
Selected performers:

- Kerri Chandler
- Function live
- Jeremy Underground
- Virginia ft. Steffi & Dexter live
- Laurent Garnier
- Sven Väth
- DJ Shadow
- Margaret Dygas b2b Bambounou

=== 2017 ===
Selected performers:

- Nina Kraviz
- Carl Craig
- Marcel Dettmann
- The Martinez Brothers
- Dixon
- The Black Madonna
- OKO DJ

=== 2018 ===
Selected performers:

- Laurent Garnier
- Jeff Mills
- Richie Hawtin
- Tale Of Us
- Maetrik
- Charlotte de Witte
- Chloé

=== 2019 ===
Selected performers:

- Charlotte de Witte
- Denis Sulta
- Derrick May
- Modeselektor
- Rødhåd
- Robert Hood

=== 2022 ===
Selected performers:

- Richie Hawtin
- Dax J
- Dixon
- Nina Kraviz
- DJ Python
- SHERELLE
- Bambounou

=== Notable screenings at Peacock Society ===
In addition to live music performances, The Peacock Society integrates a variety of film screenings and experimental video projections into its program. Some notable screenings have included:

- Raving Iran (2016) - A documentary that provides a glimpse into the underground techno scene in Iran, highlighting the life-threatening challenges faced by two DJs under a repressive regime.
- Kvadrat (2013) – A documentary illustrating the archetype of a techno DJ on tour, screened during the 2016 edition of the festival and followed by a Q&A with director Anatoly Ivanov, joined by DJ Simo Cell, DJ Busy and moderated by Trax magazine journalists Patrick Thevenin and Arnaud Wyart.
- Ex-TAZ Citizen Ca$h - A documentary about the 1987-1994 early undergroung Paris electronic music scene, by Xanaé Bove, featuring Lychee, Jean-Claude Lagrèze, David Guetta, Albert de Paname, Ariel Wizman and Pat Ca$h
- Berlin: Symphony of a Metropolis (1927) - A classic silent documentary by Walter Ruttmann, set to a live electronic score, immersing the audience in a historical yet modern cinematic experience.

The festival also features avant-garde video art installations by contemporary artists, creating an interplay between electronic soundscapes and visual stimuli.

== Arte broadcast ==
The festival was featured on the French-German culture channel Arte in 2022, highlighting the essence of the festival's outdoorsy atmosphere, particularly through the performance of u.r.trax, a rising star in the French techno scene. The Arte broadcast captured the unique vibe of the festival, showcasing how the lush surroundings of Parc de Choisy in Créteil contribute to its distinctive character.
