= Ghosts (Monolake album) =

Studio album by Monolake
- Released: 2012
- Genre: Techno
- Length: 60:23
- Label: Imbalance Computer Music
- Producer: Monolake

Ghosts is the seventh album from German techno music producer, Monolake (also known as Robert Henke). It is the second part of what is claimed to be a trilogy of three albums, that began with Monolake's sixth album, Silence. Although the album follows a primarily techno aesthetic, it also incorporates elements of drum n' bass, dubstep, and ambient music.

== Production and critical reception ==
Professional ratings
Review scores
Source	Rating
Beats Per Minute	80%
PopMatters	8/10 stars
Resident Advisor	4.5/5 stars
Sputnik Music	4/5 stars
Exclaim!	Favorable

Some of the sounds of this album are notable in that they were created by sampling recordings that included frequencies outside of the range of human hearing (above 20 kHz), and then transposed down into the audible range. In order to make this possible, the entire album was produced at a 96 kHz sampling rate (contrasted with the typical 44.1 kHz rate). Despite wide-based praise for the sound design of the album, other reviewers commented that this came at this expense of the album's emotional impact.

== Track listing ==
1. Ghosts
2. Toku
3. Afterglow
4. Hitting the Surface
5. Discontinuity
6. The Existence of Time
7. Phenomenon
8. Unstable Matter
9. Lilith
10. Aligning the Daemon
11. Foreign Object
