= Ele (album) =

Studio album by Vladislav Delay
- Released: January 1, 1999
- Genre: Ambient, dub, glitch, experimental
- Length: 65:07
- Label: Sigma Editions
- Producer: Vladislav Delay

Vladislav Delay chronology
Ele (1999)	Entain (2000)

Ele is Finnish producer Sasu Ripatti's debut full-length album as Vladislav Delay. It was released in 1999 on the Australian label Sigma Editions.

The tracks on Ele average over twenty minutes in length. Two of the tracks, "Kohde" and the title track, were reworked in shorter versions on Delay's second album Entain.

== Critical reception ==
Professional ratings
Review scores
Source	Rating
AllMusic	3/5 stars

Allmusic gave it three stars, comparing his music to that of Steve Reich, Oval, Thomas Brinkmann, and Pole and calling it Delay's "defining point-of-departure in defining a new hybrid dub, minimalism, IDM, post-techno music."

== Track listing ==
1. "Pisa" (17:35)
2. "Kohde" (30:28)
3. "Ele" (17:04)
