= Ableton Live =

Digital audio workstation

- Developer: Ableton
- Release: October 30, 2001; 25 years ago
- Stable release: 12.4.16 / October 30, 2026
- Written in: C++
- Operating system: Windows, macOS
- Type: Digital audio workstation
- License: Proprietary
- Website: www.ableton.com/live/

Ableton Live is a digital audio workstation for macOS and Windows developed by the German company Ableton.

In contrast to many other software sequencers, Live is designed to be an instrument for live performances as well as a tool for composing, recording, arranging, mixing, and mastering audio. It is also used by DJs, as it offers a suite of controls for beatmatching, crossfading, and other different effects used by turntablists, and was one of the first music applications to automatically beatmatch songs.

Live is available directly from Ableton in three editions: Intro (with fewer features), Standard, and Suite (with the most features). The Suite edition includes "Max for Live" functionality, developed in partnership with Cycling '74.

Ableton has also made a fourth version of Live, Lite, with similar limitations to Intro, which is only available bundled with a range of music production hardware, including MIDI controllers and audio interfaces.

== History ==
Live was created by Gerhard Behles, Robert Henke and Bernd Roggendorf in the mid-1990s. Behles and Henke met while studying programming at Technische Universität Berlin, and wrote software in the music programming language Max to perform techno as their band Monolake. Henke and Behles identified a need in Berlin's electronic music scene for user-friendly software for live performances, and worked with local acts to develop it. Though Live was not developed in Max, Max was used to prototype most of its features.

Henke said later of Live's creation, "I think the feeling we had was [that] there was enough like-minded people in our closer community who could appreciate a product like this, and that it could work commercially. That gave us confidence to believe that a small company could actually survive on the market." He said one of the first industry figures to recognize Live's potential was the Hollywood composer Hans Zimmer, who was impressed by Live's ability to change the tempo of a loop without altering its pitch. Roggendorf, another programmer, joined Behles and Henke in the late 90s and helped them turn their Max patches into a general set of software for retail. They released the first commercial version of Live on October 30, 2001.

Unlike Pro Tools, which focuses on multitrack recording, the first version of Live was designed for performing live with loops. It offered sophisticated tools for triggering loops, playing samples and time stretching audio, and was immediately popular with electronic music producers. Live's time stretching algorithm, known as "Warping", was particularly notable and gave DJs greater control over mixing and beatmatching, smoothly blending tracks of different tempos.

In 2004, Live expanded to become a DAW with a MIDI sequencer and support for virtual studio technology (VST).

In 2010, Ableton introduced Max for Live, enabling connectivity between Max and Live. Live made it easier for musicians to use computers as instruments in live performance without programming their own software, influencing the rise of global festival culture in the 2000s.

In 2016, Henke left Ableton to concentrate on his artistic project Monolake.

Major releases
Version	Released
Live 1.0	30 October 2001
Live 2.0	22 December 2002
Live 3	10 October 2003
Live 4	28 July 2004
Live 5	24 July 2005
Live 6	29 September 2006
Live 7	29 November 2007
Live 8	2 April 2009
Live 9	5 March 2013
Live 10	6 February 2018
Live 11	23 February 2021
Live 12	5 March 2024

== Features ==
=== Views ===
Live's user interface is composed of two 'Views' – Session View and Arrangement View. Session View offers a grid-based representation of all of the Clips in a Live Set. These clips can be arranged into scenes which can then be triggered as a unit. For instance a drum, bass and guitar track might comprise a single scene. When moving on to the next scene, which may feature a synth bassline, the artist will trigger the scene, activating the clips for that scene. Arrangement View offers a horizontal music production timeline of Clips that is more similar to a traditional software sequencer interface. The Arrangement View is used for recording tracks from the session view and further manipulating their arrangement and effects. It is also used for manual MIDI sequencing.

Live utilizes audio samples or MIDI sequences, referred to as Clips, which are arranged to be played live (i.e. "launched") or played back in a pre-arranged order. MIDI information received by Live can trigger notes on Live's built in instruments, as well as third party VST instruments or external hardware.

=== Instruments ===
Live Intro includes four instruments (Impulse, Simpler, Instrument Rack, and Drum Rack). Live Standard additionally includes External Instrument, with users having the option to purchase additional instruments. By contrast, Live Suite includes all available instruments.

- Analog - physically-modeled analog synthesizer.
- Bass - a monophonic virtual analog bass synthesizer.
- Collision - a mallet percussion physical modelling synthesizer.
- Drift - a subtractive synthesizer enabled with MIDI Polyphonic Expression functionality.
- Drum Rack - an instrument framework that maps individual MIDI notes to separate instrument chains, supporting up to 128 notes at a time. Any Ableton or VST instrument can be used inside a chain, such as a sampler or synthesizer, and you can set which note is sent to the instrument. Each chain is capable of having its own effects.
- Drum Synths - 8 devices for creating drum and percussion sounds via synthesis.
- Electric - physically-modeled electric piano instrument.
- Granulator III - a granular synthesizer
- Impulse - a traditional drum triggering instrument which allows the user to define a kit of up to eight drum sounds, each based on a single sample. There are a number of effects available such as basic equalization, attack, decay, pitch shift, etc. Once the kit is defined, rhythms and beats are created through Live's MIDI sequencer.
- Instrument Rack - allows the user to combine multiple instruments and effects into a single device, allowing for split and layered sounds with customized macro controls.
- Meld - A synthesizer with two macro oscillators, meaning the user can choose between multiple different synthesis modes.
- Operator - an FM synthesizer.
- Poli - a virtual analog synthesizer that combines subtractive and FM synthesis
- Sampler - an enhanced sampler.
- Simpler - a basic sampling instrument. It functions using a single audio sample, applying simple effects, and envelopes, finally applying pitch transformations in the form of Granular synthesis. In this case, incoming MIDI does not trigger drums as it does in Impulse, but selects the final pitch of the sample, with C3 playing the sample at its original pitch.
- Tension - a string physical modelling synthesizer.
- Wavetable - a wavetable synthesizer featuring two oscillators and re-mappable modulation sources.

Ableton also offers a selection of Add-on Sample Packs with which a user can expand the sound libraries for their instruments. These include:

- Session Drums - a collection of sampled drum kits.
- Latin Percussion - a collection of sampled latin percussion hits and loops.
- Essential Instruments Collection - a large collection of acoustic and electric instrument samples.
- Orchestral Instrument Collection - a collection of four different orchestral libraries, which can be purchased individually or as a bundle: Orchestral Strings, Orchestral Brass, Orchestral Woodwinds and Orchestral Percussion. The Orchestral Instrument Collection is included upon purchase of Live Suite but must be downloaded separately.

=== Dedicated hardware instruments ===
Akai Professional makes the APC40 mk II, a MIDI controller designed to work solely with Live and closely maps the layout of Live's Session View onto a physical control surface. A smaller version, the APC20, was released in 2010. Novation offers the Launchpad, a pad device that has been designed for use with Live.

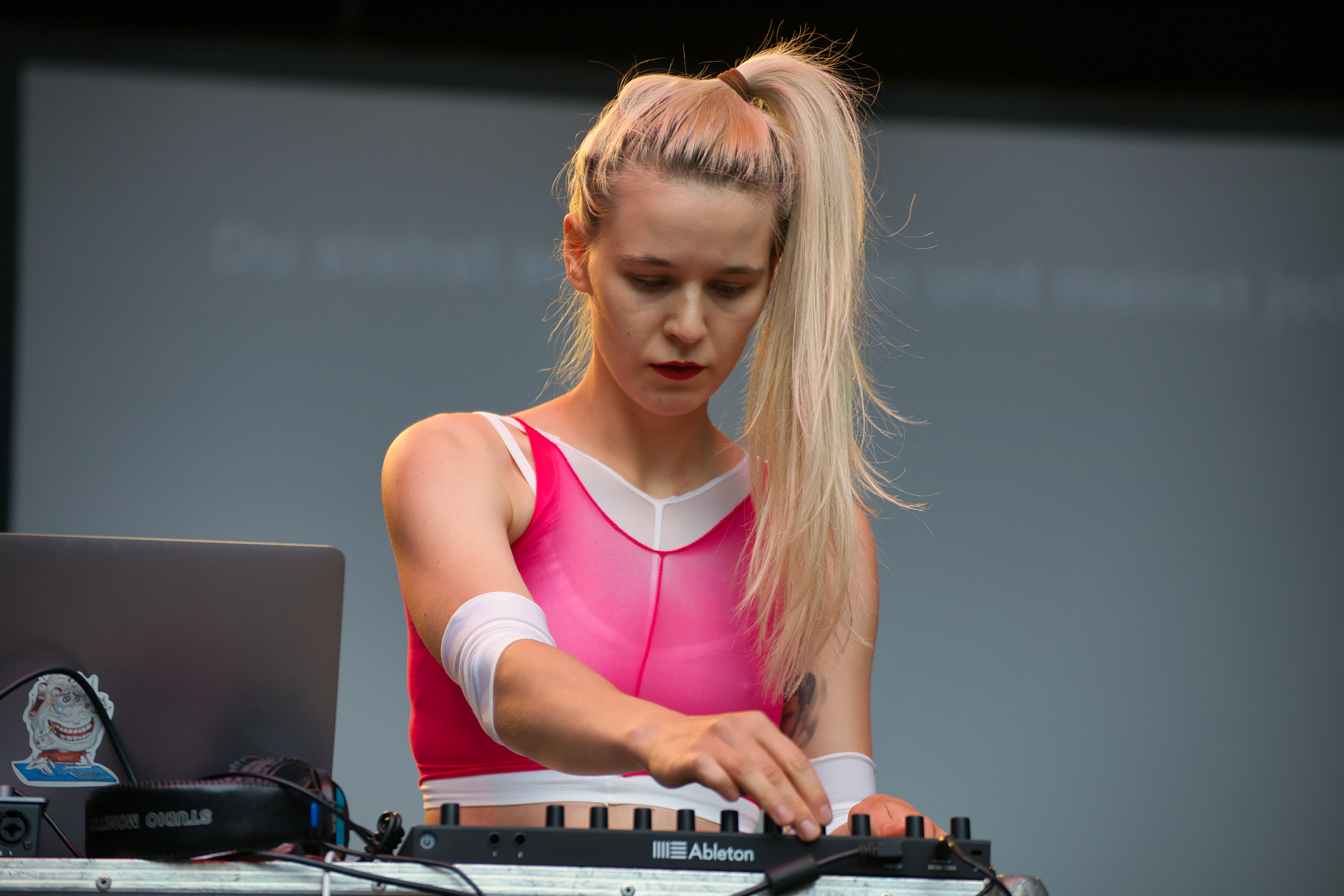
Ableton Push controller used by Pussy Riot in 2022

Ableton has also released their own MIDI controller, the Push, which is the first pad-based controller that embraces scales and melody. In November 2015, Ableton released an updated MIDI controller, the Push 2, along with Live 9.5. Push 2 features a new color display, improved buttons and pads, and a lighter frame. In May 2023, Ableton released the Push 3 as Controller and as Standalone-Version.

On October 8th, 2024 Ableton released their second hardware product, Move, which functions as a compact standalone groovebox, or as a MIDI controller for Ableton Live.

=== Effects ===
Live features a suite of built-in audio effects that are common amongst digital audio workstations; including EQ, delay, reverb, compression, and distortion. In addition, Live has numerous other effects that can be used creatively for composition and sound design. Beat Repeat slices loops and adds variations left to chance. Spectral Resonator, Spectral Delay and Spectral Time use spectral processing to make glitchy, metallic sounding delay, reverb, and vocoder-like pitch effects. Some effects are reproductions of classic hardware, such as the Glue Compressor (styled from SSL bus compression) and the Echo (simulates noise and delay-time wobble as characteristic in analogue delay). Furthermore, Live features effects that can simulate a guitar rig and other signal degradation effects, including an amp-sim, Overdrive (band-pass filtered clipping with built-in distortion), Pedal (circuit-level modelled overdrive, distortion, and fuzz from guitar pedals), Erosion (uses filtered-noise or a sine wave to modulate the time of a very short delay), Saturator (waveshaping distortion with controls to dial in a custom curve), Redux (bit-depth reduction and downsampling), Dynamic Tube (models saturation produced by vacuum tubes), and Vinyl Distortion (harmonic distortion models with a crackle generator.) Live also supports hardware audio effects routed into its signal chain through the External Audio Effect device.

As well as audio effects, Live features MIDI effects that shape the incoming MIDI data (either from the arrangement or from live input) before it reaches the instrument. These include an Arpeggiator, that can conform to the key of the song as well as play in higher octaves than the input, as well as a Chord device that automatically plays musical intervals when a single note is pressed according to the user's preference.

Live is also able to host VST plugins and, on the macOS version, Audio Unit plug-ins as well as Max for Live devices since Live 9.

=== Working with audio clips ===
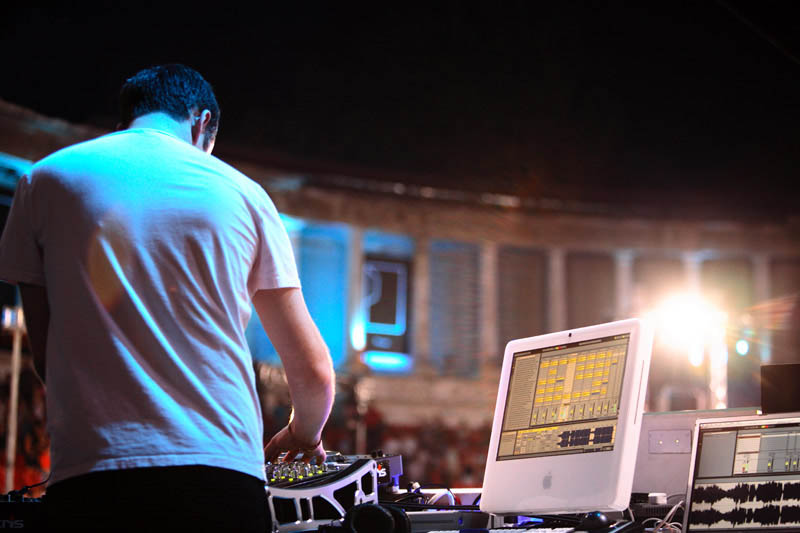
Sasha playing a DJ set using Ableton Live running on an iMac G5

In addition to the instruments mentioned above, Live can work with audio samples. Live attempts to do beat analysis of the samples to find their meter, number of bars and the number of beats per minute. This makes it possible for Live to shift these samples to fit into loops that are tied into the piece's global tempo.

Additionally, Live's Time Warp feature can be used to either correct or adjust beat positions in the sample. By setting warp markers to a specific point in the sample, arbitrary points in the sample can be pegged to positions in the measure. For instance a drum beat that fell 250 ms after the midpoint in measure may be adjusted so that it will be played back precisely at the midpoint.

Live also supports Audio To MIDI, which converts audio samples into a sequence of MIDI notes using three different conversion methods including conversion to Melody, Harmony, or Rhythm. Once finished, Live will create a new MIDI track containing the fresh MIDI notes along with an instrument to play back the notes. Audio to midi conversion is not always 100% accurate and may require the artist or producer to manually adjust some notes.

=== Envelopes ===
Almost all of the parameters in Live can be automated by envelopes which may be drawn either on clips, in which case they will be used in every performance of that clip, or on the entire arrangement. The most obvious examples are volume and track panning, but envelopes are also used in Live to control parameters of audio devices such as the root note of a resonator or a filter's cutoff frequency. Clip envelopes may also be mapped to MIDI controls, which can also control parameters in real-time using sliders, faders and such. Using the global transport record function will also record changes made to these parameters, creating an envelope for them.

=== User interface ===
Much of Live's interface comes from being designed for use in live performance, as well as for production. There are few pop up messages or dialogs. Portions of the interface are hidden and shown based on arrows which may be clicked to show or hide a certain segment (e.g. to hide the instrument/effect list or to show or hide the help box). The user is warned when an attempted action will stop the audio playback as a preventative measure for live performers.

Live now supports latency compensation for plug-in and mixer automation.

== See also ==
- List of music software
- Multitrack recording
