= Ableton =

German music software company

- Type: AG
- Industry: Music software, music equipment manufacturer
- Founded: 1999; 27 years ago
- Headquarters: Prenzlauer Berg, Berlin, Germany
- Area served: Worldwide
- Key people: Gerhard Behles (CEO); Jan Bohl (COO/CFO); Robert Henke (co-founder); Bernd Roggendorf (co-founder)
- Products: Ableton Live; Ableton Push; Ableton Move; Ableton Note
- Revenue: $18.5 million (2012)
- Number of employees: about 350 (2020)
- Subsidiaries: Ableton, Inc. (US subsidiary); Ableton KK (JP subsidiary); Cycling '74
- Website: ableton.com

Ableton AG is a German music software company that produces and distributes the production and performance program Ableton Live and a collection of related instruments and sample libraries, as well as their own hardware controller Ableton Push. Ableton's office is located in the Prenzlauer Berg district of Berlin, Germany, with a second office in Pasadena, California.

== History ==
Ableton was founded in 1999 by Gerhard Behles and Robert Henke, who together formed the group Monolake, and software engineer Bernd Roggendorf. After Behles' work on granular synthesis for Native Instruments' Reaktor, as well as earlier software using a Silicon Graphics workstation at Technische Universität Berlin, Live was first released as commercial software in 2001. Behles remains the chief executive officer of Ableton.

In March 2007, Ableton announced it was beginning a collaboration with Cycling '74, producers of Max/MSP. This collaboration is not directly based on Live or Max/MSP, but rather combines the two companies' strengths in a new product.

In January 2009, the Ableton/Cycling '74 product "Max for Live" was announced. "Max for Live" makes it possible to create Max/MSP patches directly inside of Live. The patches act like other plug-ins in Live do, supporting preset saving, automation, and other features. It is possible to create both customized hardware plug-ins and patches as well as actions within those plug-ins that control every aspect of Live, essentially anything that can be clicked with a mouse.

Ableton holds many music production sessions and seminars to learn to use their software, and licenses "certified Ableton trainers."

In April 2015, Ableton published the hardcover book Making Music: 74 Creative Strategies for Electronic Music Producers written by Dennis DeSantis who is the Head of Documentation at Ableton and formerly a sound designer for Native Instruments. The work is organized according to three main categories: Problems of Beginning, Problems of Progressing, and Problems of Finishing and aims primarily to address "the non-technical aspects of the process of making music." While it shows images only of Ableton Live, the information is not specific to Ableton Live.

In June 2017, Ableton acquired Cycling '74, developers of the digital signal processing environment Max/MSP and its integrated version Max for Live.

== Products ==
=== Ableton Live ===
Live is a digital audio workstation developed by Ableton and is currently in its twelfth version. There are three primary editions of the software: Live 12 Standard (the core software for music performance and creation), Live 12 Suite (adds on Max for Live and an expansive selection of instruments, effects, and samples), Live 12 Intro (an introductory version of Live with track and effect limitations). Live Lite is another more restricted edition bundled with various hardware and applications. Ableton Live is designed to be used with a wide range of USB and MIDI controllers, as well as instruments and virtual instruments.

=== Ableton Push ===
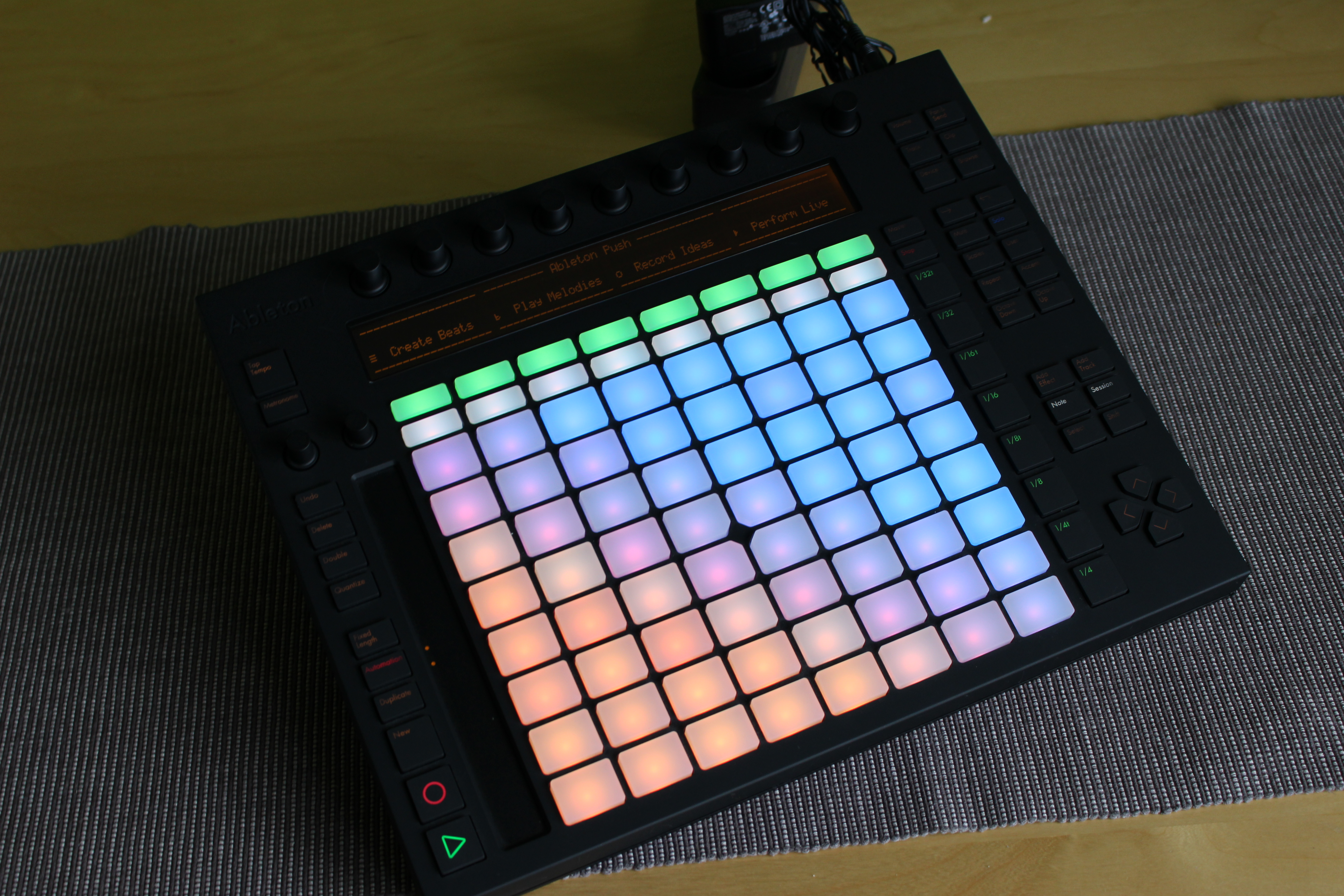
Ableton Push

In March 2013, the company released the Push controller for Live 9 in cooperation with Akai Professional. It gives access to most performing elements within the digital audio workstation from the one unit, playing notes on a device or instrument, sequencing melodic notes and parameters, and triggering clips via a 64 pad matrix.

In November 2015, Ableton released the second iteration of the Push, Ableton Push 2, which features an onboard display and better integration with the Live software.

In May 2023, Ableton released the Push 3, in two versions. The tethered Push 3 acts as a USB controller for Live, and the standalone Push 3 contains a CPU, battery and hard drive, and can act as a controller or run Live internally.

=== Ableton Operator ===
Operator is a software synthesizer developed by Ableton, first released in 2005. It runs exclusively in Ableton Live, and is included with the Suite version of the program; Live Lite users can purchase Operator separately for 99 USD. It uses a hybrid of frequency modulation (FM), subtractive, and additive synthesis with four oscillators, and has been used by artists including Skrillex and Monolake.

=== Ableton Move ===
Move is a portable, 4 track groove-box with deep Ableton Live integration that released in October 2024.

=== Ableton Note ===
Note is a mobile companion app to Ableton Live that was released in October of 2022. It gives out Ableton Live Lite to those who purchase.

== See also ==
- Digital audio workstation
