= Rakka II =

Studio album by Vladislav Delay
- Released: 16 April 2021
- Genre: Electronic
- Length: 39:36
- Label: Cosmo Rhythmatic
- Producer: Sasu Ripatti

Vladislav Delay chronology
Rakka (2020)	Rakka II (2021)	Isoviha (2022)

Rakka II is a studio album by Finnish record producer Sasu Ripatti under the pseudonym Vladislav Delay. It was released on 16 April 2021 through Cosmo Rhythmatic.

== Background ==
Sasu Ripatti, also known as Vladislav Delay, is a Finnish record producer. Rakka II is a sequel to Rakka (2020). It contains eight tracks. He described the album as "a romantic summer vision full of hope and optimism." An official teaser video was released on 25 February 2021. The album was released on 16 April 2021 through Cosmo Rhythmatic.

== Critical reception ==
Professional ratings
Review scores
Source	Rating
AllMusic	4/5 stars
Pitchfork	7.8/10
Spectrum Culture	74%

Paul Simpson of AllMusic wrote, "while it's just as intense as the first Rakka, somehow these brutalist audio storms seem less hellish, and even bright and optimistic." Joshua Minsoo Kim of Pitchfork stated, "despite the rapturous sonics, Ripatti is doing what he's always done best: crafting detailed soundscapes that make you feel small, forever at the mercy of his intricate productions." Daniel Bromfield of Spectrum Culture commented that "even though Rakka II is both shorter and easier to listen to than Rakka, it's by no means less powerful, and it's certainly no closer to ambient music."

=== Accolades ===
Year-end lists for Rakka II
Publication	List	Rank	Ref.
AllMusic	Favorite Electronic Albums	—	

== Track listing ==
All tracks are written by Sasu Ripatti.

Rakka II track listing
No.	Title	Length
1.	"Rakkn"	5:37
2.	"Raaa"	4:01
3.	"Raaha"	5:12
4.	"Rapaa"	5:18
5.	"Rakas"	3:42
6.	"Ranno"	4:56
7.	"Raato"	5:07
8.	"Rapine"	5:43
Total length:		39:36

== Personnel ==
Credits adapted from liner notes.

- Sasu Ripatti – production
- Loop-O – mastering
- LCR – artwork
- Pasquale Ascione – graphic layout, type
