= The Present Lover =

Studio album by Luomo
- Released: 2003
- Genre: Deep house; microhouse
- Length: 75:06
- Label: Force Tracks
- Producer: Vladislav Delay

Luomo chronology
| Vocalcity (2000) | The Present Lover (2003) | Paper Tigers (2006) |

The Present Lover is a studio album by Finnish record producer Sasu Ripatti under the pseudonym Luomo. It was originally released in 2003 through Force Tracks. In the United States, it was released on 24 February 2004 through Kinetic Records. It was proceeded by the 12" single "Diskonize Me"/"Body Speaking." Compared to its predecessor Vocalcity (2000), the album emphasizes pop-oriented vocals and less spacious production.

== Critical reception ==
Professional ratings
Review scores
| Source | Rating |
|---|---|
| AllMusic | 4.5/5 stars |
| Pitchfork | 8.0/10 |
| Spin | B |
| Uncut | 2/5 stars |

AllMusic described the album's style as "an opulent, full-bodied sound; aided by a broader palette of rhythms and starring roles from male and female vocalists," concluding that it "only cements the man's status as some sort of Nordic deity." Pitchfork stated that following its predecessor, the album "continues the experiment, and in general improves on it," while also noting cautiously that the vocals are "reminiscent of thousands of faceless lounge and downtempo compilations featuring "soulful divas" and androgynous emoting."

Pitchfork placed the album's song "Tessio" at number 153 on its list of "The 200 Best Songs of the 2000s".

== Track listing ==
All tracks are written by V. Delay.

1. Visitor – 4:13
2. Talk in Danger – 7:46
3. The Present Lover – 9:19
4. Body Speaking – 8:09
5. So You – 6:06
6. Could Be Like This – 8:12
7. Cold Lately – 4:45
8. Tessio – 9:25
9. What Good – 8:16
10. Shelter – 8:54

== Personnel ==
Credits adapted from liner notes.

- V. Delay – production
- von Oswald – mastering
- Marc Hohmann – art direction, design, photography
- Akiko Tsuji – art direction, design
- Ananda – modeling
