= Monolake =

German electronic music group

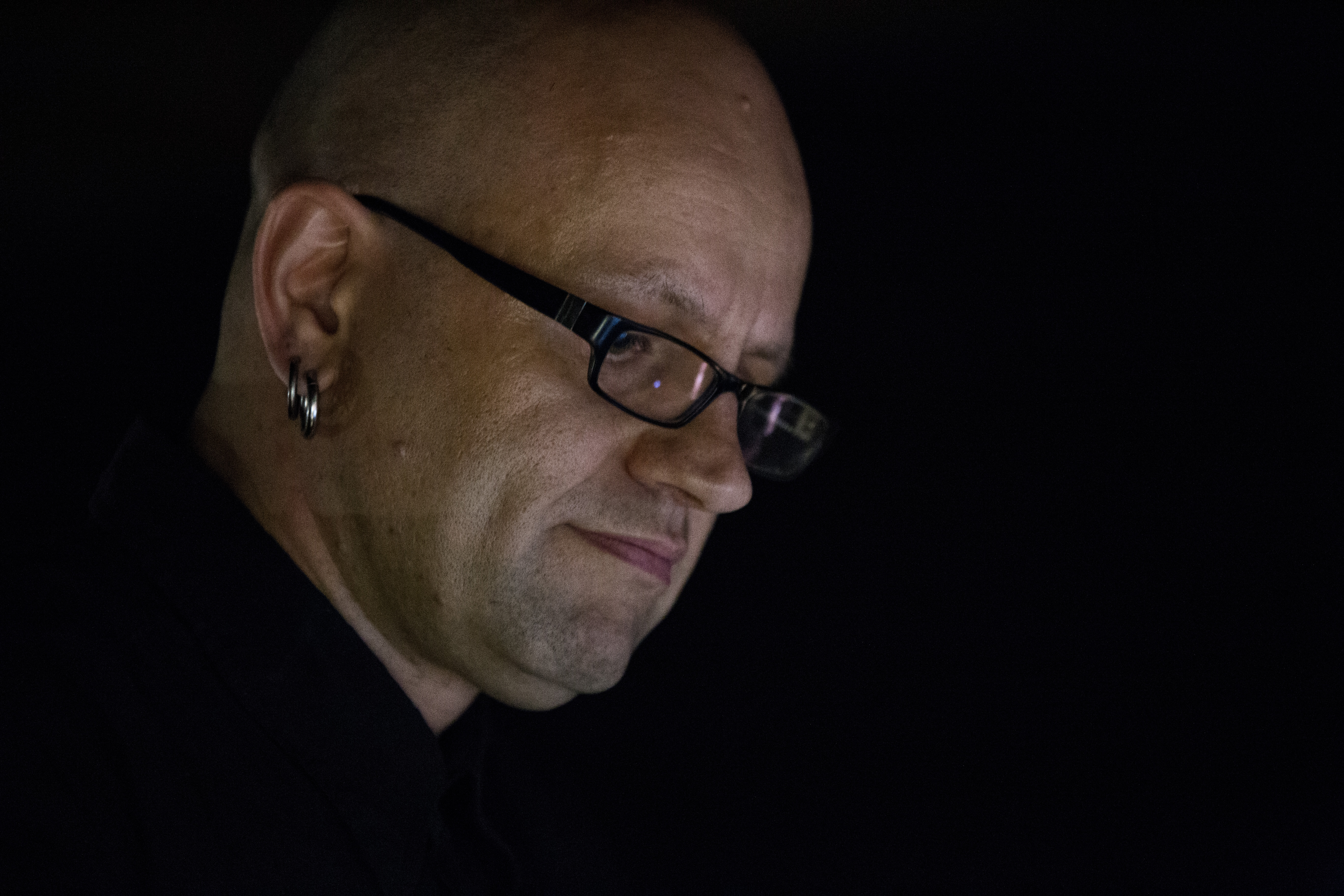
- Monolake in 2014

Background information
- Origin: Berlin, Germany
- Genres: Dub techno, minimal techno, ambient
- Labels: Chain Reaction, [ml/i]
- Members: Robert Henke
- Past members: Torsten Pröfrock; Gerhard Behles

Monolake is a German electronic music project founded in 1995, initially consisting of members Gerhard Behles and Robert Henke. Monolake is now being perpetuated by Henke while Behles has focused on running the music software company Ableton, which they founded in 1999 together with Bernd Roggendorf. In 2004, Torsten Pröfrock became a member of the project. Monolake is now perpetuated by Henke alone.

Monolake's minimal, dub-influenced techno helped establish the sound of the Chain Reaction label, also located in Berlin, which subsequently used their own [ml/i] (Monolake / Imbalance Computer Music) label for the group's output. Both current members of Monolake have their own solo projects, with Henke releasing under his own name and Pröfrock as "T++" and "Various Artists."

In 2008, T++ followed Ricardo Villalobos in bridging the gap between minimal techno and dubstep by remixing Shackleton's Death Is Not Final for the Skull Disco label.

In 2009, Henke appeared in the electronic music documentary Speaking In Code, which presented the completion of the Monodeck. As of 2012, Henke has been designing a new form of live show syncing surround-sound audio stems with visual loops, allowing for improvisation.

Monolake is named after Mono Lake, which is east of the Sierra Nevada in California.

== Monodeck ==
Robert Henke's Monodeck II

Henke is a software engineer who develops custom software and hardware for live performances. As well as working as an engineer for Ableton, Henke designed the Atlantic Waves software for performing live with other producers in different countries simultaneously.

In 2003, Henke designed the Monodeck, a MIDI-controller interface for spontaneous editing and effects work during live performances, even without having to look at the computer screen. The Monodeck and its successor, Monodeck II, control Ableton Live through special software designed with Max/MSP.

== Discography ==
- Hongkong (1997)
- Gobi. The Desert EP (1999)
- Interstate (1999)
- Cinemascope (2001)
- Gravity (2001)
- Momentum (2003)
- Polygon Cities (2005)
- Plumbicon Versions (2006)
- Silence (2009)
- Ghosts (2012)
- VLSI (2016)
- Archaeopteryx (2020)
- Studio (2024)

Robert Henke solo

- Piercing Music (1994)
- Floating Point (1997)
- Signal to Noise (2004)
- Layering Buddha (2006)
- Atom/Document (2008)
- Indigo Transform (2009)
- Signal to Noise - Volume II (2026)

Torsten Pröfrock solo

- Various Artists, Decay Product (1997)
- Various Artists, 8, 8.5, 9 Remixes (1999)
- Dynamo, Außen Vor (2002)
