= Visa (album) =

Studio album by Vladislav Delay
- Released: November 10, 2014
- Genre: Ambient
- Label: Ripatti
- Producer: Vladislav Delay

Visa is a studio album by Finnish producer Sasu Ripatti under the name Vladislav Delay. Ripatti conceived and created the album in two weeks after being denied entry to the United States for a planned tour. It was released on November 10, 2014, through his own label Ripatti.

== Critical reception ==
Professional ratings
Review scores
Source	Rating
Tiny Mix Tapes	4/5 marks
Resident Advisor	4/5 stars

Resident Advisor gave the album four stars out of five, calling it "organic and terrifically spontaneous" and describing it as "some of his best work." Tiny Mix Tapes also gave the album four stars out of five, calling it an "incredible album." Daniel Bromfield of the Daily Emerald called it Ripatti's "most compelling release under the Vladislav Delay name in some time," comparing it favorably to his earlier Kemikoski EP released as Conoco.

== In other media ==
"Viisari" appeared on the soundtrack of the 2015 film The Revenant.

== Track listing ==
1. "Visaton" – 23:28
2. "Viaton" – 10:01
3. "Viisari" – 6:03
4. "Vihollinen" – 10:53
5. "Viimeinen" – 3:54
