= Robert Henke =

- Also known as: Monolake
- Origin: Munich, Germany
- Genres: Electronic music
- Years active: 1994–present
- Label: Imbalance Computer Music
- Website: www.roberthenke.com

Robert B. Henke (born 1969) is a German computer music artist working in the fields of audiovisual installation, music and performance. He was born in Munich, Germany, and lives in Berlin.

Coming from an engineering background, Henke is fascinated by the beauty of technical objects. Developing his own instruments and algorithms is an integral part of his creative process. His materials are computer generated sound and images, field recordings, photography and light; transformed, re-arranged and modulated by mathematical rules, real time interaction and controlled random operations. Many of his works use multiple channels of audio or are specifically conceived for unique locations and their individual properties. For the past few years, he has been exploring the artistic usage of high power lasers in his installations and performances.

Robert Henke is also a co-creator of the music software Ableton Live, with Gerhard Behles.

Since 1995 he has produced electronic music under the name Monolake, which he founded in collaboration with Gerhard Behles.

He writes and lectures about sound and the creative use of computers at the Berlin University of the Arts, the Center for Computer Research in Music and Acoustics (CCRMA) at Stanford University, and the Studio National des Arts Contemporains - Le Fresnoy in Lille, France.

His installations, performances and concerts have been presented at the Tate Modern London, the Centre Pompidou Paris, Le Lieu Unique Nantes, PS-1 New York, MUDAM Luxembourg, MAK Vienna, the Art Gallery of New South Wales in Australia, KW Institute for Contemporary Art, Berlin.

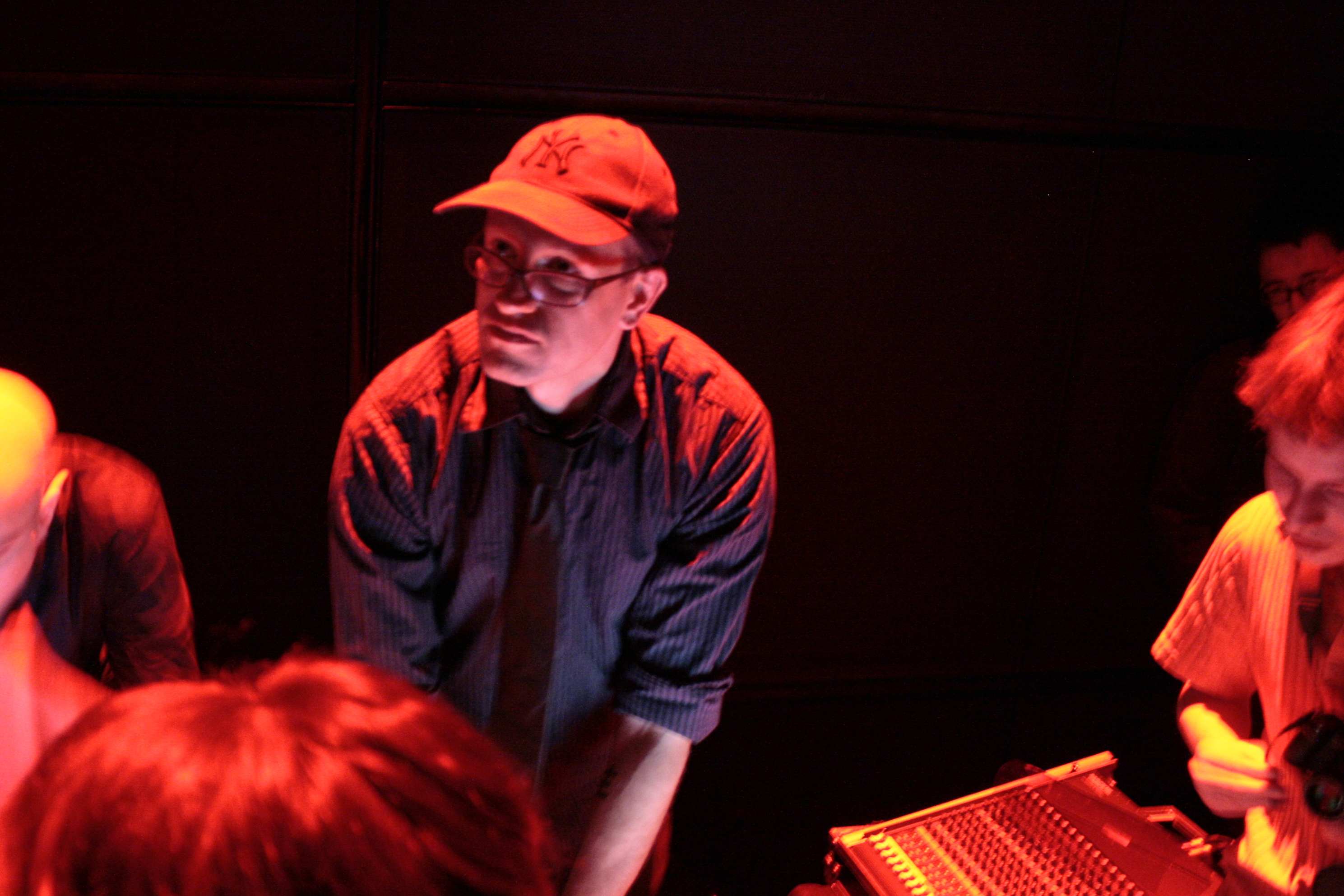
Robert Henke during an Atom live performance

== Selected installations ==
- Fountain Scan
- Cos/Sin
- Destructive Observation Field
- Werk III
- Fragile Territories
- Ritual
- Phosphor
- Works for Wave Field Synthesis
- Fundamental Forces

== Selected performances ==
- CBM 8032 AV
- Deep Web
- Lumiere II
- Destructive Observation Field
- Monolake Live Surround
- Intersection
- Atlantic Waves

== Selected albums ==
- Robert Henke - Signal To Noise - Volume II (2026)
- Monolake - Studio (2024)
- Monolake - Archaeopteryx (2020)
- Monolake - VLSI (2016)
- Monolake - Ghosts (2012)
- Monolake - Silence (2009)
- Robert Henke - Indigo_Transform (2009)
- Robert Henke - Atom/Document (2008)
- Robert Henke - Layering Buddha (2006)
- Monolake - Plumbicon Versions (2006)
- Monolake - Polygon Cities (2005)
- Robert Henke - Signal To Noise (2004)
- Monolake - Momentum (2003)
- Monolake - Cinemascope (2001)
- Monolake - Gravity (2000)
- Monolake - Gobi. The Desert EP (1999)
- Monolake - Interstate (1998)
- Robert Henke - Floating.Point (1997)
- Monolake - Hongkong (1997)
- Robert Henke - Piercing Music (1994)
