= Transport (album) =

Studio album by Borderland (Juan Atkins & Moritz von Oswald)
- Released: April 29, 2016
- Genre: Techno
- Length: 58:43
- Label: Tresor
- Producer: Juan Atkins; Moritz von Oswald

Borderland chronology
Borderland (2013)	Transport (2016)

Singles from Transport
- 1. "Riod" Released: 2016

Transport is the second studio album by Borderland, a duo consisting of Juan Atkins and Moritz von Oswald. It was released via Tresor on April 29, 2016, as part of Tresor's 25th anniversary celebrations. It is the follow-up to the duo's 2013 debut studio album, Borderland. "Riod" was released as a single from the album.

== Critical reception ==
Professional ratings
Review scores
Source	Rating
AllMusic	4/5 stars
Exclaim!	7/10
The Quietus	favorable

Paul Simpson of AllMusic gave the album 4 out of 5 stars, writing, "Transport's seven tracks are hypnotic, expansive, and unforced, with both artists seeming very comfortable in the studio." Maria Perevedentseva of The Quietus wrote, "Transport does not represent a paradigm shift nor an experimental frenzy, but what it does offer is a studied and disarmingly beautiful crystallisation of more than two decades of techno, produced by two people who have been at its cutting edge since the very beginning."

Rolling Stone placed it at number 19 on the "20 Best EDM and Electronic Albums of 2016" list.

== Track listing ==
All tracks are written by Juan Atkins and Moritz von Oswald.

No.	Title	Length
1.	"Transport"	7:28
2.	"Lightyears"	7:26
3.	"Odyssey"	8:11
4.	"Riod"	10:42
5.	"Merkur"	5:20
6.	"2600"	9:06
7.	"Zeolites"	10:30

== Personnel ==
Credits adapted from liner notes.

- Juan Atkins – production
- Moritz von Oswald – production
- Laurens von Oswald – additional production
- CGB – mastering
- Chazme – artwork
- Vanja Golubovic – graphic design

== Charts ==
Chart	Peak position
Belgian Albums (Ultratop Flanders)	189
