= Vladislav Delay =

Finnish musician (born 1976)

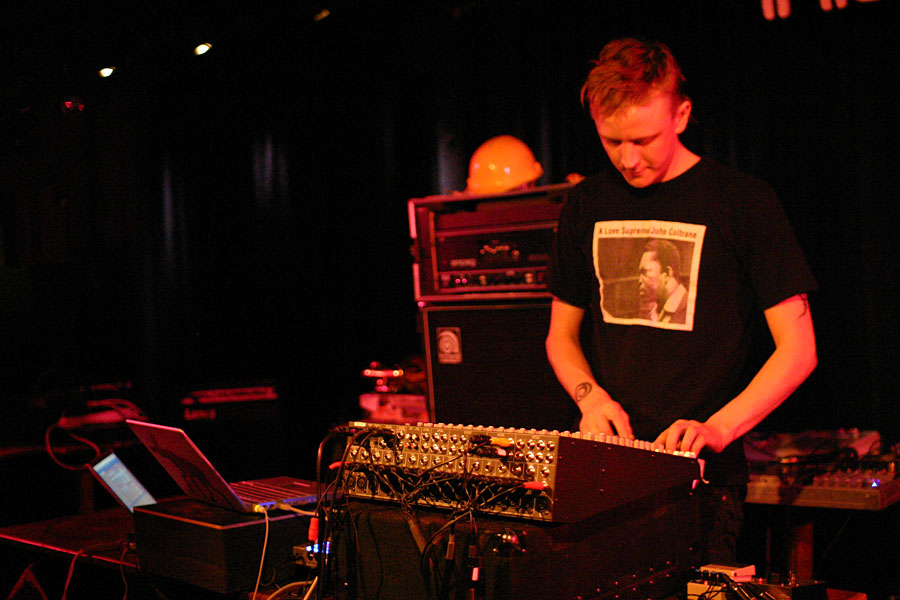
- Ripatti performing live in 2006

Background information
- Also known as: Luomo; Sistol; Uusitalo; Conoco
- Born: Sasu Ripatti; 1976 (age 49–50)
- Origin: Oulu, Finland
- Genres: Electronica; dub techno; house; ambient; glitch
- Occupation: Record producer
- Years active: 1997–present
- Labels: Raster-Noton; Force Tracks; Chain Reaction; Huume; Mille Plateaux; Resopal; Sigma Editions; Ripatti; Planet Mu

Sasu Ripatti (born 1976), better known by the pseudonym Vladislav Delay, is a Finnish electronic musician. He has also recorded as Luomo, Sistol, Uusitalo, Conoco, and Ripatti, working in styles such as minimal techno, glitch, and house.

== Biography ==
Ripatti has been involved in the ambient music, glitch, house, and techno genres. His method of track production involves a mixture of synthesizing, vocal recording and live reprocessing. Many tracks have an organic feeling, conjured through rolling, dubby basslines and processed vocal snippets, often from his wife Antye Greie aka AGF. Their daughter was born in 2006.

Ripatti has released EPs and albums on numerous underground electronic labels, including Raster-Noton, Force Tracks, Chain Reaction, Mille Plateaux, Resopal, and Sigma Editions. He also founded the Finnish music label Huume Recordings and currently runs a label called Ripatti, on which he has released the album Visa and several footwork-oriented singles under the name Ripatti.

Ripatti played drums and percussion in the Moritz von Oswald Trio alongside Moritz von Oswald and Max Loderbauer from 2009 until 2015, when he was replaced by Tony Allen. With the Moritz von Oswald Trio he has released two albums and a live LP. He has also released an album in 2011 with his own experimental jazz/electronic group, the Vladislav Delay Quartet.

He performed as Vladislav Delay at an All Tomorrow's Parties festival in May 2011 curated by Animal Collective, who have praised his album Multila and whose member, Panda Bear, thanked his Luomo alias in the liner notes of his techno-inspired album Person Pitch.

Under the pseudonym Luomo, Ripatti released Vocalcity (2000), The Present Lover (2003), Paper Tigers (2006), Convivial (2008), and Plus (2011).

Under the pseudonym Vladislav Delay, Ripatti also released Vantaa (2011), Kuopio (2012), Visa (2014), Rakka (2020), Rakka II (2021), and Isoviha (2022).

== Musical style ==
Ripatti's music is renowned for its sophisticated textural qualities. His sonic approach relies heavily on a semi-random element, and many undulating, complementary and sometimes conflicting layers interplay throughout most of his music. A de-constructive element is sometimes detected within the music as Ripatti makes comment on established genres within his various releases.

Characteristic traits within Ripatti's music are sometimes a deep or bubbling synth-bass line, fractured and syncopated percussion - often placed freely within the music, long delay repetitions of various sounds, syncopated use of vocal samples, and complicated digital effect processing techniques. Generally, the music has a very spacious and organic sound, and albums such as Anima feature a very simple theme repeated with an array of musical and rhythmical interjections.

Ripatti releases under different names have conceptually varied, but have sonically related qualities; this may be due to Ripatti's different composition techniques. Uusitalo releases are often anchored by a house beat and highlight rhythmic variation (see 2007's Karhunainen). Vladislav Delay releases, on the other hand (see 2000's Multila), explore rhythmically sparse, experimental and ambient techno-dub soundscapes. Works under the Luomo name feature dance-floor ready vocal house. Sistol performs microhouse; Conoco (under which he was only released one early EP, Kemikoski) is similar to his Vladislav Delay work but harsher and more industrial. His Ripatti releases are (a pastiche of) Chicago footwork.

Sasu Ripatti often references himself within his music. The "Vapaa Muurari" album, for example, provided much of the instrumental material for Vocalcity. Similarly, the track "Tessio" on the "Vocalcity" album was re-recorded for the "Present Lover" album in 2003.

== Discography ==
=== Albums ===
==== As Vladislav Delay ====
- Ele (1999)
- Entain (2000)
- Multila (2000)
- Anima (2001)
- Naima (2002)
- Demo(n) Tracks (2004)
- The Four Quarters (2005)
- Whistleblower (2007)
- Tummaa (2009)
- Vantaa (2011)
- Kuopio (2012)
- Visa (2014)
- Untitled - Circa 2014 (2018)
- Rakka (2020)
- Rakka II (2021)
- Isoviha (2022)
- In a Lawless World There Is Strength in Numbers (2025)

==== With Vladislav Delay Quartet ====
- Vladislav Delay Quartet (2011)

==== With Vladislav Delay Quintet ====
- vd5 (2026)

==== As Sistol ====
- Sistol (1999)
- On the Bright Side (2010)

==== As Uusitalo ====
- Vapaa Muurari (2000)
- Tulenkantaja (2006)
- Karhunainen (2007)

==== As Luomo ====
- Vocalcity (2000)
- The Present Lover (2003)
- The Kick (with Domenico Ferrari; 2004)
- Paper Tigers (2006)
- Convivial (2008)
- Plus (2011)

==== As Ripatti ====
- Fun Is Not a Straight Line (2021)

==== As Ripatti Deluxe ====
- Speed Demon (2022)

==== As AGF/Delay ====
- Explode (with Antye Greie; 2005)
- Symptoms (with Antye Greie; 2009)

==== As Delay/Aarset ====
- Singles (with Eivind Aarset; 2022)

==== As The Dolls ====
- The Dolls (with Antye Greie and Craig Armstrong; 2005)

==== With Moritz von Oswald Trio ====
- Vertical Ascent (2009)
- Live in New York (2010)
- Horizontal Structures (2011)
- Fetch (2012)

=== EPs and singles ===
- The Kind of Blue EP (1997)
- Huone (1999)
- Helsinki/Suomi (1999)
- Ranta (2000)
- Kemikoski (as Conoco; 2000)
- Livingston (as Luomo; 2000)
- Native (as Luomo; 2000)
- Carter (as Luomo; 2001)
- Tessio (Remixes) (as Luomo; 2001)
- Diskonize Me (as Luomo; 2002)
- Tessio (as Luomo; 2003)
- Waltz for Your Eyes (as Luomo; 2003)
- Running Away (as Luomo, with Raz Ohara; 2003)
- Demo(n) Cuts EP (2004)
- What's Good (as Luomo; 2004)
- The Kick (as Luomo, with Domenico Ferrari; 2004)
- Really Don't Mind (as Luomo; 2006)
- Love You All (as Luomo featuring Apparat; 2008)
- Tessio Remixes (as Luomo; 2009)
- Symptoms (as AGF/Delay, with Antye Greie; 2009)
- Restructure 2 (as Moritz Von Oswald Trio, remixed by Digital Mystikz; 2010)
- Latoma EP (2011)
- Espoo EP (2012)
- Ripatti 01 (as Ripatti; 2014)

== Work ==
=== Television ===
- Arctic Circle (2014–2023)
