= Chain Reaction (record label) =

German record label

- Founded: 1995
- Founder: Moritz Von Oswald; Mark Ernestus
- Genre: Dub techno Minimal techno Ambient techno
- Country of origin: Germany
- Official website: Chain Reaction

Chain Reaction was a German record label founded in 1995 by Basic Channel members Moritz Von Oswald and Mark Ernestus. The label's output consisted of the extended friends and family of the Basic Channel duo, which centered on the Hard Wax record store in Berlin.

The label's sound focused on a similar minimal and dub techno style as that of Basic Channel, rooted in atmospherics and minimalism, but some have found Chain Reaction's output to be "more avant-experimental".

Notable artists that have released records on the label include Monolake, Porter Ricks, Vainqueur and Fluxion.

The last record on the label was released in 2003.

== Discography ==
=== CR (12") ===
CR 01 - Scion - "Emerge" (1995)
CR 02 - Various Artists - "1-7" (1995)
CR 03 - Porter Ricks - "Port Of Transition / Port Of Call" (1996)
CR 04 - Monolake - "Cyan" (1996)
CR 05 - Substance - "Relish" (1996)
CR 06 - Vainqueur - "Reduce" (1996)
CR 07 - Vainqueur - "Elevation" (1996)
CR 08 - Monolake - "Magenta" (1996)
CR 09 - Porter Ricks - "Port Of Nuba / Nautical Nuba" (1996)
CR 10 - Pelon - "No Stunts" (1996)
CR 11 - Helical Scan - "Index" (1996)
CR 12 - Resilent - "1.1 / 1.2 / 2" (1996)
CR 13 - Vainqueur - "Solanus" (1996)
CR 14 - Porter Ricks - "Nautical Dub (Tidal Mix) / Port Gentil" (1996)
CR 15 - Monolake - "Lantau / Macao" (1997)
CR 16 - Erosion - "1 / 2 / 3" (1997)
CR 17 - Continuous Mode - "Direct Out / Direct Drive" (1997)
CR 18 - Substance - "Scent / Relish Sessions" (1997)
CR 19 - Vainqueur - "Elevation II" (1997)
CR 20 - Ridis - "Triangle / Foto / Is # 10" (1997)
CR 21 - Fluxion - "Lark / Atlos" (1998)
CR 22 - Hallucinator - "People" (1998)
CR 23 - Matrix - "Isolated Dot" (1999)
CR 24 - Fluxion - "Largo" (1999)
CR 25 - Hallucinator - "Red Angel" (1999)
CR 26 - Vladislav Delay - "Huone" (1999)
CR 27 - Matrix - "Isthmus #Fast" (1999)
CR 28 - Hallucinator - "Black Angel" (1999)
CR 29 - Fluxion - "Prospect" (1999)
CR 30 - Vladislav Delay - "Ranta" (2000)
CR 31 - Matrix - "See Off" (2000)
CR 32 - Fluxion - "Bipolar Defect" (2000)
CR 33 - Hallucinator - "Frontier" (2000)
CR 34 - Shinichi Atobe - Ship Scope" (2001)
CR 35 - Hallucinator - "Morpheus" (2003)

=== CRD (CD) ===
CRD-01 - Porter Ricks - "Biokinetics" (1996)
CRD-02 - Vainqueur - "Elevations" (1997)
CRD-03 - Various Artists - "Decay Product" (1997)
CRD-04 - Monolake - "Hongkong" (1997)
CRD-05 - Substance - "Session Elements" (1998)
CRD-06 - V/A - "...Compiled" (1998)
CRD-07 - Fluxion - "Vibrant Forms" (1999)
CRD-08 - Hallucinator - "Landlocked" (1999)
CRD-09 - Vladislav Delay - "Multila" (2000)
CRD-10 - Matrix - "Various Films" (2000)
CRD-11 - Fluxion - "Vibrant Forms II" (2000)
