= Hard Wax =

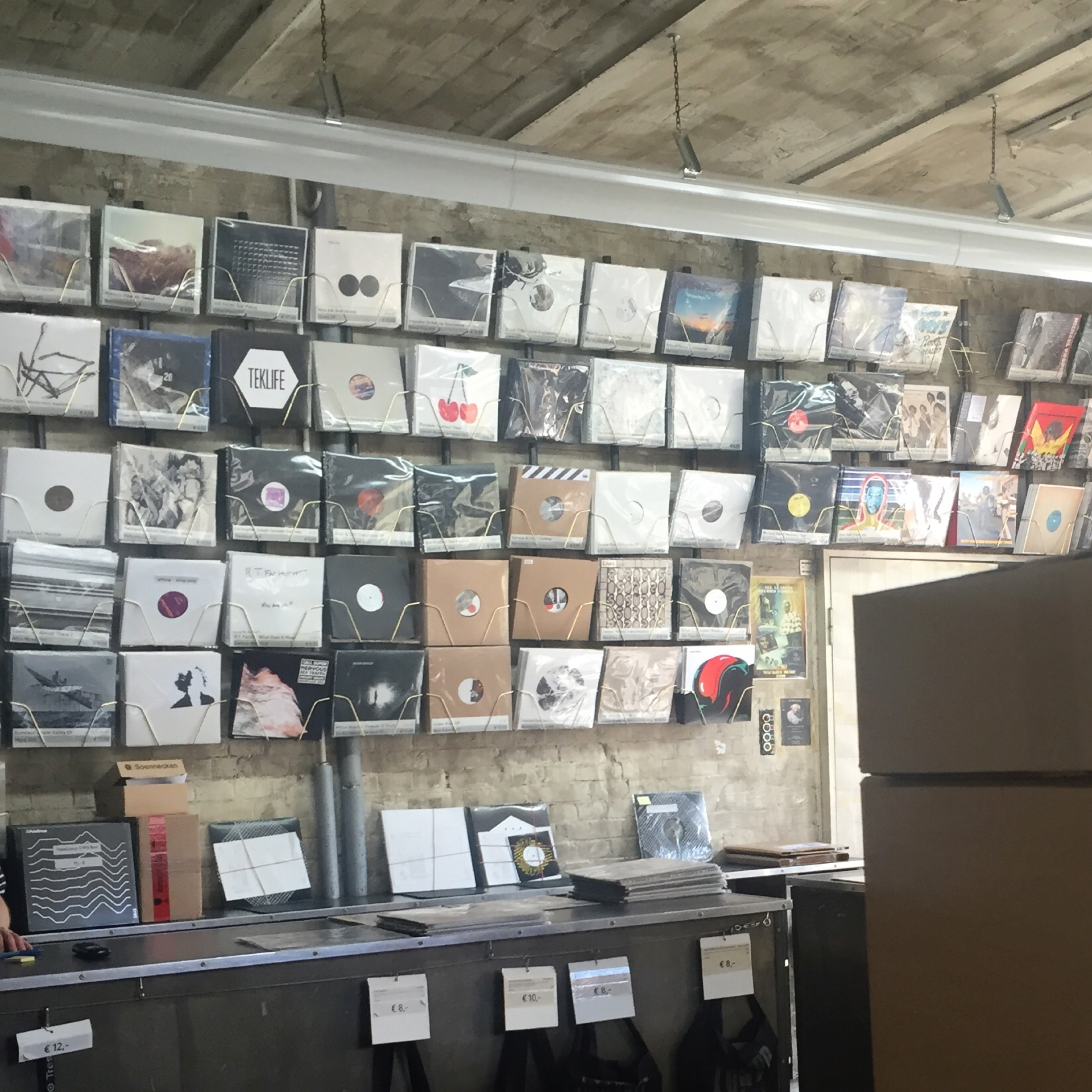
- Location: Berlin
- Coordinates: 52°29′48″N 13°25′15″E
- Address: Köpenicker Straße 70
- Opened: 1989
- Website: Official website

Hard Wax is a record shop located in the Kreuzberg borough of Berlin, Germany. It was founded in 1989 by Mark Ernestus of Basic Channel at the ground floor of a Reichenberger Straße building. It is specialized in techno music, reggae, dub and dubstep. Hard Wax also serves as a distributor for several Berlin-based record labels linked to the Basic Channel aesthetic. Some members (or former members) of its staff include prominent DJs like DJ Hell, Gernot Bronsert of Modeselektor, Marcel Dettmann, DJ Rok, Gabriele "Mo" Loschelder or Susanne Kirchmayr. The latter was in charge of sales from 1993 to 1996. The shop sets place a mail order system through its website, which represented 50% of the sales in 2009.

In 1996, Hard Wax moved to the third floor of an old factory in Paul-Lincke-Ufer 44A sharing its premises with the Basic Channel record label and the Dubplates and Mastering studio. It's one of the oldest record stores in electronic music in Berlin. Playing the role of an important hub for the techno community in the world, the shop helped extensively the development of this burgeoning scene in the 90s. Furthermore, as with Tresor club in Berlin, it shares a privileged relationship with the musicians of Detroit techno in the so-called "Berlin-Detroit axis".

In 2023, Hard Wax moved to Kraftwerk Berlin on Köpenicker Straße, alongside Tresor.
