= Vocalcity =

2000 studio album by Luomo

Studio album by Luomo
- Released: 23 May 2000
- Genre: Microhouse; deep house
- Length: 76:40
- Label: Force Tracks
- Producer: Vladislav Delay

Luomo chronology
Vocalcity (2000)	The Present Lover (2003)

Alternative cover
- 2005 reissue

Vocalcity is a studio album by Finnish electronic music producer Sasu Ripatti, better known as Vladislav Delay, and the first to be released under his stage name Luomo. It was released on 23 May 2000 on Force Tracks, and was reissued in 2005 on Ripatti's label Huume.

In contrast to Ripatti's earlier work, Vocalcity features a more uptempo deep house sound. The album has been described by critics as an influential release in the subgenre microhouse, which emphasized the minimal elements of house music.

== Critical reception ==
Professional ratings
Review scores
Source	Rating
AllMusic	4.5/5 stars
Muzik	4/5
Pitchfork	9.7/10
Spin	8/10

AllMusic reviewer Jason Birchmeier stated that Vocalcity "offers a powerful statement of purpose: glitch can indeed be funky and soulful without forsaking any of its forward-looking clicks + cuts aesthetic," and called it "the sort of album you can safely recommend to anyone." Writing for Pitchfork in 2005, Philip Sherburne praised the music's expansiveness and Luomo's influence in "seduc[ing] the tinkerers away from their mouse pads and back to the land of goosebumps and sex," stating that "what you hear now, after the demise of clicks + cuts, aren't the pinpricks but the enormous, inflated sounds of everything else—bass, pads, and of course those vocals."

Vocalcity was named the 13th best album of the 2000s by Resident Advisor, which called Luomo "arguably the first artist to successfully meld next-level production techniques with a rich, emotionally-charged soul," and stated that the album "set the tone for a decade that would see the conservative boundaries of what we once knew as house transformed beyond all recognition." The A.V. Club included Vocalcity in its list of the best electronic music of the 2000s, commenting that "warm, enveloping, and riddled with doubt, the debut of Luomo remains one of the decade's most audacious mergers. Deep-house beats and (especially) bass merged with glitch-techno methodology and dub production technique."

Pitchfork placed the album at number 43 on its list of "The 200 Best Albums of the 2000s".

== Track listing ==
All tracks are written by Sasu Ripatti.

1. "Market" – 11:59
2. "Class" – 12:31
3. "Synkro" – 13:59
4. "The Right Wing" – 16:08
5. "Tessio" – 12:07
6. "She-Center" – 9:56

== Personnel ==
Credits are adapted from the album's liner notes.

- Luomo (also credited as Luukas Onnekas and Vladislav Delay) – music, production, executive production
- Jukka Turunen – photography, design
