= Antye Greie =

German vocalist & musician (born 1969)

- Born: 24 September 1969 (age 56); Ebersbach, East Germany
- Genres: Experimental; Electronica; Electroacoustic; Glitch
- Occupations: vocalist, producer, composer, sound artist, new media
- Instruments: vocals, electronics
- Years active: 1996–present
- Labels: AGF Producktion; Orthlorng Musork; Kitty-Yo; BPitch Control; Asphodel
- Website: www.poemproducer.com, www.antyegreie.com

Antye Greie, also known as AGF or Poemproducer, is a vocalist, musician, composer, producer, and new media artist.

== Life ==
Greie was born and raised in East Germany. Her work involves speech combined with electronic music. She works on sound installations, moving image, audio visualization and real time video processing. In 2009, as part of the collective The Lappetites, she staged the multimedia opera Fathers in Berlin Haus der Kulturen der Welt.

In 2011 she initiated the arts organization Hai Art on the island of Hailuoto becoming the curator.

Greie has written two feature film scores, theater and dance plays.

Greie performs as AGF (solo), AGF/DELAY (with Vladislav Delay), with Zavoloka, The Dolls (with Vladislav Delay and Craig Armstrong), Laub (with Jotka), and The Lappetites (with Éliane Radigue, Kaffe Matthews and Ryoko Akama /Kuwajima).

== Personal life ==
She lived in Berlin from 1996 to 2008. In 2008 she moved to Hailuoto, Finland. She is married to Sasu Ripatti.

== Discography ==
LONGPLAYER ONLY

- AGF, Commissioned Work, 2019, digital, streaming
- AGF & Various, DISSIDENTOVA, 2018, CD Book
- AGF, SOLIDICITY,2017, digital, streaming
- AGF, Kon:3p>UTION to: e[VOL]ution, 2016, AGF Producktion, CD
- AGF & Various, A Deep Mysterious Tone, 2015, AGF Producktion, CD Book
- A-symmetry, I Am Life, 2014, AGF Producktion, CD
- Greie & Huber, Ausweg, 2014, AGF Producktion, digital album
- AGF & Various, Kuuntele, 2013, AGF Producktion, CD Book
- AGF, Source Voice, 2013, LINE [Segments], CD
- AGF, Beatnadel, 2011, AGF Producktion, CD
- AGF & Various, Gedichterbe, 2011, AGF Producktion, CD Book
- AGF & Craig Armstrong, Orlando, 2011, AGF Producktion, CD
- AGF, Filter, 2010, AGF Producktion, digital
- Greie Gut Fraktion, Baustelle, 2010, Monika Enterprise, CD
- Antye Greie aka AGF, Einzelkaempfer, 2009, AGF Producktion, CD
- AGF/DELAY, Symptoms, 2009, B-Pitch, CD
- AGF, Dance Floor Drachen, 2008, AGF Producktion, digital
- AGF, Words Are Missing, 2008, AGF Producktion, CD
- LAUB, Deinetwegen, 04/2007, AGF Producktion, CD
- Zavoloka & AGF, Nature Never Produces the Same Beat Twice, 04/2006, AGF Producktion & Nexsound, CD
- AGF.3 & Sue.C, Mini Movies, 02/2006, Asphodel, CD
- The Dolls, The Dolls, 2005, Huume Recordings, CD
- AGF/DELAY, Explode, 02/2005, AGF Producktion, CD
- The Lappetites, Before The Libretto, 10/2005, Quecksilber, CD
- AGF, Language Is The Most, 2004, Quecksilber, CD
- AGF, Westernization Completed, 11/2003, Orthlong Musork, CD, 06/2004, AGF Producktion, CD
- LAUB, Filesharing, 02/2002, Kitty-Yo, CD
- AGF, Head Slash Bauch, 01/2002, Orthlong Musork, CD/LP
- LAUB, Intuition Remixes, 09/1999, Kitty-Yo, CD
- LAUB, Unter anderen Bedingungen als Liebe, 05/1999, CD
- Tritop, Rosenwinkel, 1998, Infracom, CD/LP
- LAUB, Kopflastig, 09/1997, Kitty-Yo, CD
- LAUB, Miniversum, 1997, Kitty-Yo, CDS
- AGF / Mama Baer & Kommissar Hjuler / Marc Hurtado, Ich werde sein, 01/2018, Psych.KG, LP
- discography – all titles listed

== Awards, grants, references ==
- Ars Electronica Award of Distinction in Digital Music 2004
- Ars Electronica Jury of Digital Music in Linz 2005
- The Wire, Cover story May 2006 issue
- Jury member of Radio Art in Murcia, Spain 2009
- Deutscher Musikrat, production grant "Gedichterbe" 2010
- Finnish Arts Council, One year Artist Grant 2011
- Ars Electronica Jury of Digital Music in Linz 2012
- Ars Electronica Honorary mention of "Gedichterbe" in Digital Music 2013
- Case Pyhajoki project grant from Kone Foundatation for 2013
- Finnish Arts Council, 0,5 year artist grant by 2014
