= Basic Channel =

German music duo

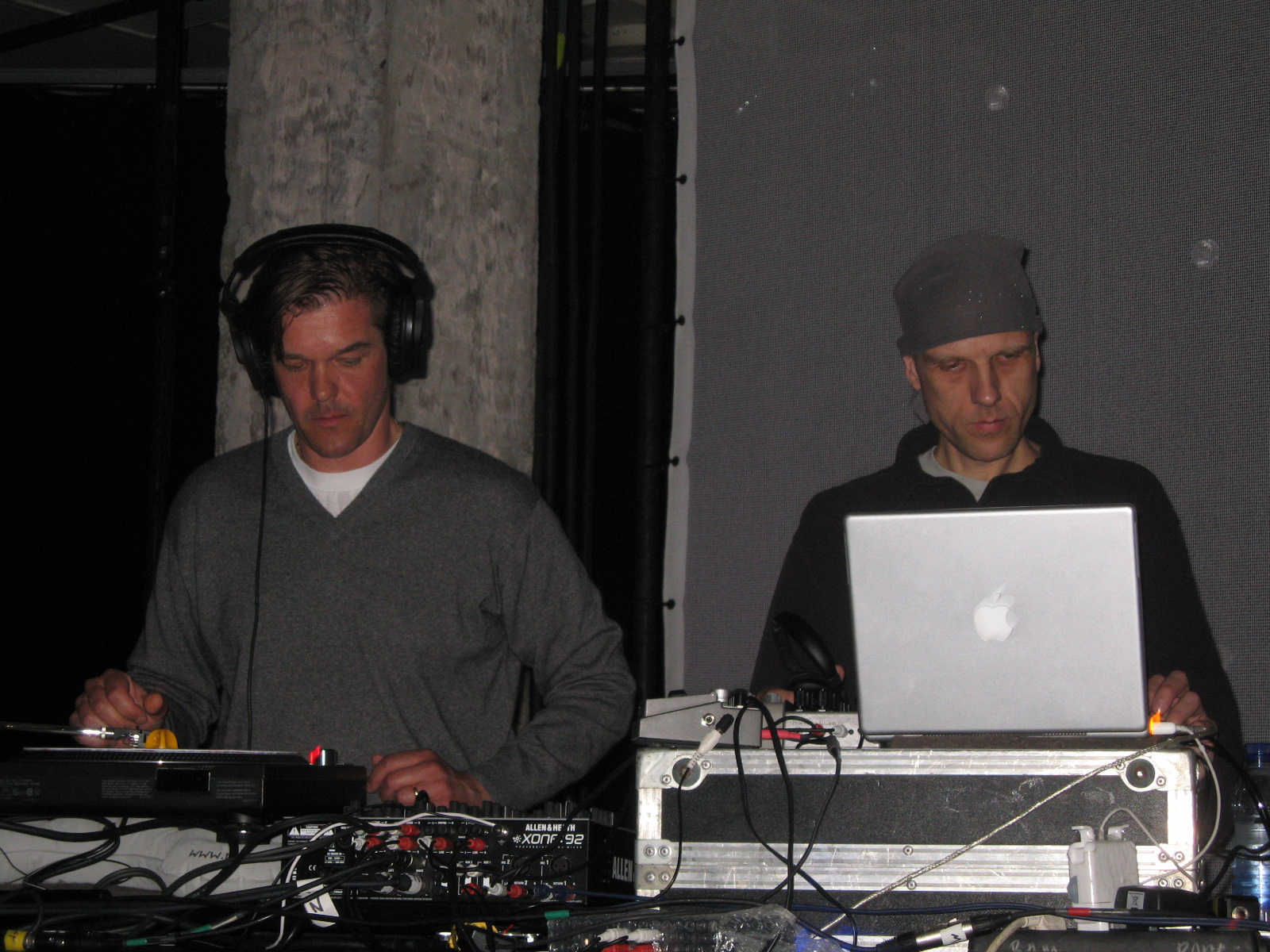
- Moritz von Oswald (left) and Mark Ernestus (right) performing at MUTEK in 2007

Background information
- Also known as: Rhythm & Sound; Maurizio; Cyrus; Quadrant; Round One to Round Five
- Origin: Berlin, Germany
- Genres: Dub techno; ambient techno; minimal techno; ambient dub
- Years active: 1993–present
- Labels: Basic Channel; Chain Reaction; Burial Mix; M-Series; Rhythm & Sound; Main Street
- Members: Moritz von Oswald; Mark Ernestus
- Website: www.basicchannel.com

Basic Channel is a German music group and record label, composed of Moritz von Oswald and Mark Ernestus, that originated in Berlin in 1993. The duo have also worked under other names, including Rhythm & Sound and Maurizio, and have founded offshoot label imprints such as Chain Reaction and Main Street. Their releases in the 1990s are regarded as pioneering examples of the minimal and dub techno subgenres.

== History ==
Basic Channel was founded by Moritz von Oswald and Mark Ernestus in 1993 in Berlin, Germany. At the time, von Oswald was working as an in-house producer for the Berlin label Tresor. The project grew around Hard Wax, the record store opened by Ernestus in 1989. In order to achieve preferred mastering quality, the duo founded their own mastering house Dubplates & Mastering.

BC-02, BC-07, and BC-08. Note the progressive distortion of the Basic Channel logo.

Between 1993 and 1994, the record label released the duo's first nine 12-inch vinyl singles under various aliases. The releases featured minimal information and cryptic lettering, leaving the origin of the projects obscure. Their minimalist sound and incorporation of delay effects inspired by dub reggae helped to define the nascent dub techno scene. The Quietus credited these releases with "spawning a legion of imitators and earning the duo legend status among those in the know." Basic Channel has since released two compilation CDs which collect edits of their 12-inch releases: BCD (1995) and BCD-2 (2008).

Moritz von Oswald and Mark Ernestus have founded subsequent record labels such as Chain Reaction, Main Street Records, and Rhythm & Sound. The duo's collaborative works have also been released under the monikers Maurizio and Rhythm & Sound. As Rhythm & Sound, the duo have recorded more faithful takes on Jamaican dub in collaboration with vocalists such as Paul St. Hilaire, Cornell Campbell, and the Love Joys.

== Discography ==
=== Basic Channel ===
Albums

- Basic Channel – BCD (1995, BCD, CD)
- Basic Channel – BCD-2 (2008, BCD-2, CD)

Singles

- Cyrus – "Enforcement" (1993, BC-01, 12")
- Basic Channel – "Phylyps Trak" (1993, BC-02, 12")
- Vainqueur – "Lyot RMX" (1993, BC-03, 12")
- Quadrant – "Q1.1" (1993, BC-04, 12")
- Cyrus – "Inversion" (1994, BC-05, 12")
- Basic Channel – "Quadrant Dub" (1994, BC-06, 12")
- Basic Channel – "Octagon" (1994, BC-07, 12")
- Basic Channel – "Radiance" (1994, BC-08, 12")
- Basic Channel – "Phylyps Trak II" (1994, BC-09, 12")
- Basic Channel – "Remake (Basic Reshape)" (2004, BC-BR, 12")
- Quadrant – "Infinition" (2004, BC-QD, 12")
- Basic Channel – "Q-Loop" (2014, BC-CD, 12")

=== Burial Mix ===
Albums

- Rhythm & Sound w/ Paul St. Hilaire – Showcase (1998, BMD-1, CD)
- Rhythm & Sound w/ the Artists – Rhythm & Sound w/ the Artists (2003, BMD-2, CD)
- Rhythm & Sound – The Versions (2003, BMD-3, CD)
- Rhythm & Sound w/ the Artists – Rhythm & Sound w/ the Artists (2004, BMLP-2, LP)
- Rhythm & Sound – The Versions (2004, BMLP-3, LP)
- Rhythm & Sound – See Mi Ya (2005, BMD-4, CD)
- Rhythm & Sound – See Mi Ya (2005, BMLP-4, LP)
- Rhythm & Sound – See Mi Ya (2005, BM-14-20, 7" box set)
- Rhythm & Sound – See Mi Ya Remixes (2006, BMXD-1, CD)

Singles

- Rhythm & Sound w/ Paul St. Hilaire – "Never Tell You" (1996, BM-01, 10")
- Rhythm & Sound w/ Paul St. Hilaire – "Spend Some Time" (1996, BM-02, 10")
- Rhythm & Sound w/ Paul St. Hilaire – "Ruff Way" (1997, BM-03, 10")
- Rhythm & Sound w/ Paul St. Hilaire – "What a Mistry" (1997, BM-04, 10")
- Rhythm & Sound w/ Paul St. Hilaire – "Why" (1997, BM-05, 10")
- Rhythm & Sound w/ Cornel Campbell – "King in My Empire" (2001, BM-06, 10")
- Rhythm & Sound w/ Paul St. Hilaire – "Jah Rule" (2001, BM-07, 10")
- Rhythm & Sound w/ Shalom – "We Been Troddin" (2001, BM-08, 10")
- Rhythm & Sound w/ the Chosen Brothers – "Making History" (2002, BM-09, 10")
- Rhythm & Sound w/ Love Joy – "Best Friend" (2002, BM-10, 10")
- Rhythm & Sound w/ Jennifer Lara – "Queen in My Empire" (2003, BM-11, 10")
- Rhythm & Sound w/ the Chosen Brothers – "Mash Down Babylon" (2003, BM-12, 10")
- Rhythm & Sound w/ Jah Batta – "Music Hit You" (2003, BM-13, 10")

=== Rhythm & Sound ===
Rhythm & Sound
- Founded: 1997
- Founder: Moritz von Oswald; Mark Ernestus
- Defunct: 2002
- Status: Inactive
- Genre: Dub techno, dub reggae
- Country of origin: Germany
- Location: Berlin

Albums

- Rhythm & Sound – Rhythm & Sound (2001, RSD-1, CD)

Singles

- Rhythm & Sound w/ Tikiman – "Music A Fe Rule" (1997, RS-01, 12")
- Chosen Brothers / Rhythm & Sound – "Mango Walk" / "Mango Drive" (1998, RS-02, 12")
- Rhythm & Sound – "Roll Off" (1998, RS-03, 12")
- Rhythm & Sound w/ Savage – "Smile" (1999, RS-04, 12")
- Rhythm & Sound – "Carrier" (1999, RS-05, 12")
- Rhythm & Sound – "Trace" / "Imprint" (2001, RS-06, 12")
- Rhythm & Sound – "Aground" / "Aerial" (2002, RS-07, 12")

=== M-Series ===
Albums

- Maurizio – M-Series (1997, MCD, CD)

Singles

- Maurizio – "Ploy" (1992, M-1, 12")
- Vainquer – "Lyot" (1992, M-2, 12")
- Maurizio – "Domina" (1993, M-3, 12")
- Maurizio – "M-4" (1995, M-4, 12")
- Maurizio – "M-4.5" (1995, M-4.5, 12")
- Maurizio – "M-5" (1995, M-5, 12")
- Maurizio – "M-6" (1996, M-6, 12")
- Maurizio – "M-7" (1997, M-7, 12")

=== Main Street ===
Albums

- Round One to Round Five – 1993-99 (1999, MSD-01, CD)

Singles

- Round One – "I'm Your Brother" (1994, MSR-02, 12")
- Round Two – "New Day (1995, MSR-04, 12")
- Round Three w/ Paul St. Hilaire – "Acting Crazy" (1995, MSR-06, 12")
- Round Four w/ Paul St. Hilaire – "Find a Way" (1998, MSR-08, 12")
- Round Five w/ Paul St. Hilaire – "Na Fe Throw It" (1999, MSR-10, 12")

=== Related releases ===
Albums

- Scion – Arrange and Process Basic Channel Tracks (2002, Tresor, Tresor 200, CD)
