= Dub techno =

Subgenre of techno music

- Stylistic origins: Techno; dub; ambient; minimal techno; electro
- Cultural origins: Early 1990s; possibly Berlin (Germany) and Osaka (Japan)

Other topics
- Dubtronica; dubstep

Dub techno is a subgenre of electronic music that originated in the early 1990s, blending the repetitive, minimal structures of techno with the echo-laden, spacey production techniques of dub music. It is notable for its deep, atmospheric soundscapes, chorded layers of elaborate basslines, slowly developing musical phrases featuring heavy delay and reverb effects. Vocals are either absent, or inspired by dub and ambient music.

== Origins and evolution ==
Dub techno appeared as a combination of two distinct musical movements: dub music from 1960s-1970s Jamaica and techno from 1980s Detroit area of the USA. Dub music evolved from reggae, characterized by slow tempo, instrumental remixes featuring heavy reverb, delay, deep bass and a laid-back, organic feel. Techno, pioneered by Juan Atkins, Derrick May, and Kevin Saunderson in Detroit, used much faster-paced synthetic sounds and repetitive structures aimed at dance floors of nightclubs.

The sound of dub techno was anticipated in the 1981 album Divin by Japanese artist Tolerance, the pseudonym of dental student Junko Tange. Her album was published by Osaka's Vanity Records, but was obscure until its rediscovery in the early 21st century.

By the early 1990s, the seemingly opposite genres of dub and techno morphed into an unlikely hybrid in Berlin, where the Fall of the Berlin Wall and the Soviet withdrawal created a surplus of cheap or abandoned properties. Which, in turn, attracted musicians, rave organizers and party goers in a city living a brief period of quasi anarchy, low costs of living and fertile ground for cultural experimentation.

Although precise historical data are sparse, the foundational moment in dub techno came when Moritz von Oswald, a percussionist from Hamburg, moved to join that Berlin's effervescent techno scene and met Mark Ernestus, who ran the Hard Wax record store there. In 1993, they formed Basic Channel, the duo credited with merging the echo-heavy production techniques of dub with the minimal structures of techno. Their early releases, first under the pseudonym of Maurizio, introduced a new sound, blending Detroit techno's mechanical rhythms with the spacious, hypnotic effects of dub.

Moritz von Oswald and Mark Ernestus later expanded on these musical ideas through projects like Burial Mix and Rhythm & Sound, which included collaborations with Caribbean vocalists from Jamaica and Dominica. These projects reissued early works in a new form, highlighting a historically rare, two-way relationship between European electronic music and Caribbean dub traditions, countering the more common practice of cultural appropriation by the First World Countries.

== Musical characteristics ==
Dub techno tracks are usually slower than conventional techno, typically ranging between 110 and 125 BPM. They follow a 4/4 beat structure, with a focus on deep, repetitive basslines. Delay and reverb effects are often applied to percussive and melodic elements, creating a sense of space and depth. Tracks are typically minimalistic, with sparse chord progressions and subtle changes that build over time. A defining feature is the use of the mixing desk as a creative instrument, a technique borrowed from dub music where live mixing plays an integral role in shaping the sound. Additionally, multiple versions or remixes of the same track are often released, a practice also inherited from dub.

== Expansion and influence ==
The success of Basic Channel quickly inspired other producers around the world. Artists from the U.S., such as Rod Modell with his DeepChord project, and Canadian producer Deadbeat, among others, began releasing similar music. Von Oswald and Ernestus opened the Chain Reaction Berlin label to expand their initial ideas and common tastes. The label not only carried forward the dub-techno hybrid but also expanded into other experimental territories. It released early works from artists like Monolake, Vladislav Delay, and Substance, solidifying dub techno's position within the global electronic music scene.

According to writer Josh Baines, who published for THUMP, an electronic music and culture channel from Vice, the works released by Chain Reaction retained a "sonic aesthetic of thawing ice" that was present in Basic Channel's music. Baines described this style as a "haunting, half-remembered sonic landscape" where the music feels distant yet immersive. He also noted how dub techno became a sort of an "aural recreation of a highly meditative, stoned-out state," contributing to its atmospheric quality and hinting at the recreation and spiritual practice of cannabis in the Caribbean (imported in turn from Indian in the middle of XIX century's British Empire).

In the 2000s and early 2010s, dub techno has spread geographically to influence artists and labels worldwide. Labels such as Echocord from Copenhagen, Silent Season from Canada, and various netlabels like Thinner in Germany and Deep In Dub in Italy helped disseminate dub techno globally. The genre also gained traction in the UK, with artists like Andy Stott and Claro Intelecto, in Turkey with Havantepe, in Russia with Andrey Pushkarev, Martin Schulte, and Heavenchord, in Lithuania with Grad_U, in Japan with Shinichi Atobe, and in Iceland with Yagya.

== Sub-labels ==
Another phenomenon proper to dub techno is the creation of sub-labels, as is the case of Main Street Records, a Basic Channel Sub-Label. Or Styrax Leaves, a subdivision of Styrax Records in Berlin, issuing more niche works by the likes of Quantec, Sven Weisemann and Intrusion. Or dub techno labels injecting elements of electro, such as Modern Love with the aforementioned Andy Stott and Claro Intelecto.

== Origin of the term ==
The term "dub techno" first appeared in the issue 209 of the British magazine The Wire in 2001. The magazine used the term "dub-Techno" (with a dash and capital T) in a review of two albums: Jan Jelinek's Loop Jazz Finding Records and Vladislav Delay's Anima. Although the genre was established as early as 1993 with Basic Channel's releases, it wasn't until the early 21st century that the term "dub techno" became widely recognized and used in the media.

== Dub techno vs deep techno vs ambient techno vs deep house ==
Other terms used by the press and artists themselves to this day had also been “deep techno” and “ambient techno”, without much of a consensus about what to call it. Even as the genre matured, artists that were more involved in other genres started to make contributions to dub techno as well. A good example is Mike Huckaby, who's better known as a deep house artist, has contributed to some of the most iconic dub techno tracks.

Other artists exist in a gray area, like for instance, Gas, who might be classified either as an ambient artist, an ambient techno artist, or a dub techno artist.

Adding to the confusion is the reality that most full-length dub techno albums to this day are often half ambient music. The two genres' focus on slow aural exploration and subtle soundscapes naturally creates some overlap and hybridization.

== Dub techno vs dubstep ==
A common misconception is that dub techno and dubstep are closely related, although both draw inspiration from dub music. Dubstep, which emerged in early 2000s London, diverges in its use of syncopated rhythms and wobbling basslines, whereas dub techno remains rooted in the minimalist, 4/4 structure of techno with a focus on atmosphere rather than rhythm.

== Representative artists ==
Some of the notable artists in dub techno include (alphabetically):

- Andy Stott (UK)
- Basic Channel (Germany)
- Deepchord AKA CV313 AKA Rod Modell (U.S.)
- Fluxion (Greece)
- Quantec (Germany)
- Vladislav Delay (Finland)

== Analysis and criticism ==
Baines compared dub techno to ambient music due to its often slow, atmospheric nature, and its ability to serve as background music. He remarked that the genre excels in its subtlety, with "every element given breathing space," creating a sense of organic fluidity.

However, the genre has also been criticized for its repetitiveness veering on the monotone and for not venturing far beyond the foundational works of Basic Channel and DeepChord.

Despite these criticisms, dub techno remains highly regarded for its immersive qualities, appreciated by fans who value introspection and a meditative listening experience. Its focus on atmosphere and careful nuance, sometimes borrowing from the clicks and cuts movement, gives the genre a unique place within electronic music.

== Bibliography ==
- Remixology: Tracing the Dub Diaspora, by Paul Sullivan
- Techno Rebels: The Renegades of Electronic Funk, by Dan Sicko
- Der Klang der Familie: Berlin, Techno, and the Fall of the Wall, by Felix Denk and Sven Von Thülen

== Filmography ==
- Kvadrat (2013) – a feature-length documentary which explores the dub techno genre, using the music as a metaphor of the monotonous but mesmerizing day-to-day work of dub techno producer and DJ Andrey Pushkarev, with a soundtrack dominated by dub techno, directed by Anatoly Ivanov. The only film which brought the niche genre outside the techno industry onto the big screen and into the wider circle of cinema lovers and critics.
- The History of Dub Techno in 17 Minutes (2020) – A documentary available on YouTube till 2022, directed by Dub Monitor AKA Altstadt Echo & St. Concrete, initially published on the Dub Monitor channel (Internet Archive version)
