= Ginger (Speedy J album) =

Studio album by Speedy J
- Released: 21 June 1993
- Studio: The Plant
- Genres: IDM; ambient; techno
- Length: 64:02
- Labels: Plus 8, Warp
- Producer: Jochem Paap

Speedy J chronology
Ginger (1993)	G-Spot (1995)

Artificial Intelligence series chronology
Dimension Intrusion (1993)	Ginger (1993)	Incunabula (1993)

Ginger is the debut studio album by Dutch electronic music producer Speedy J (Jochem Paap). Released via a joint deal between Plus 8, Beam Me Up! and Warp in September 1993, the album was the sixth release in Warp's Artificial Intelligence series, which focused on "electronic listening music" by different artists. It peaked at number 68 on the UK Albums Chart and remains Speedy J's most successful album there.

After establishing himself as a techno producer and disc jockey, Paap recorded Ginger with the intention of transferring his techno sound to a home listening environment, an idea he shared with Plus 8 founder Richie Hawtin, who also contributed to the Artificial Intelligence series. The album carries Paap's minimalist style into music that combines hard beats with ambient music, with 4/4 beats but atypical percussive elements and tempos. Although the album was rooted in techno and rave music, it is considered one of the earliest IDM albums. Upon release, it received acclaim for its forward-thinking style. "De-Orbit", which had also featured on the Artificial Intelligence compilation album, was placed at number 9 on Fact magazine's 2014 list of the "100 greatest IDM tracks".

== Background ==
As one of the first techno producers to hail from Benelux, Rotterdam-based Jochem Paap began creating music as a techno producer and nightclub disc jockey, and chose the pseudonym Speedy J in reference to his prowess as a DJ. He established a fan base with the release of the acid techno twelve-inch singles including "Three O'Three" and "Something for Your Mind." His profile rose when two of his tracks were included on the compilation Artificial Intelligence (1992), including "De-Orbit," which went on to feature on Ginger. Paap recorded Ginger, his debut album, at The Boiler. He wrote and produced the album alone, except for the track "Pepper" co-produced with Natalie Maxine Pfeffer, to whom the album is dedicated. The album was released via a joint deal between Plus 8 Records and Warp Records; Plus 8 founder Richie Hawtin shared a kinship with Paap as both were intrigued in "finding a way to push techno via the album format," and both Ginger and Hawtin's album Dimension Intrusion (released as FUSE) were initially issued via Plus 8 and then licensed to Warp's album series Artificial Intelligence. The series focused on "electronic listening music" by different Warp artists, with albums in the series emphasising texture and melody over driving beats, and went on to help establish Warp as a seminal label in the "post-techno, post-rave underground." In the Netherlands, the album was released on Speedy J's own label, Beam Me Up!

== Composition ==
According to Joshua Glazer of AllMusic, Paap's clear intent with Ginger was "to take his music out of the rave and into the home-listening environment," and balances elements of the manic energy that defined his early releases with a lush sound palette. The album blends textures of ambient music with hard beats, presenting a dynamic, melodic and occasionally subtle style with influences of club music. According to Rupert Howe of Select, the minimalist style of Paap's prior productions is presented on the album with a more domesticated pace, complemented by a percussive, semi-ambient groove that "recognises that the secret of trance lies as much in the groove as in clouds of ethereal synth noise." Paul Cooper of Pitchfork described the record's style as "belittled beats in deference to drifting, ambient nebulae." Unlike other Artificial Intelligence albums, Ginger makes usage of pauses, abruptness and empty space.

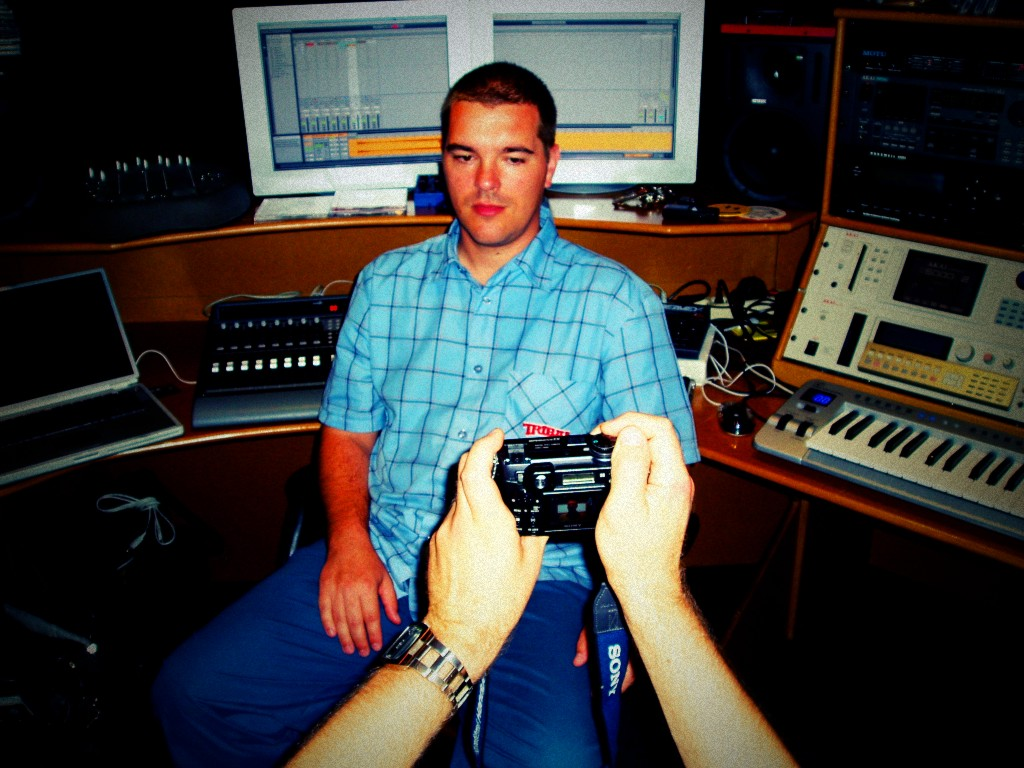
Speedy J (pictured 2003) expanded his sound on Ginger to incorporate a lush sound palette.

Ginger is widely considered an IDM album, as although 4/4 beats appear on each track, none of the tracks possess tempos or percussive elements considered "hefty enough to meet dancer's needs," according to Glazer. The record is nonetheless considered to be primarily techno in style by Joe Muggs of The Wire, who felt the album was "still rave music". Muzik made note of the album's "cinematic techno" sound, while Heath K Hignight of Cleveland Scene felt the album was "a dynamic dance-listening hybrid album." In an interview with The List, Paap described his influences as dance music's "black roots", such as Arthur Baker's twelve-inch remixes and jazz-funk from the late 1970s and early 1980s.

The album was the first in the Artificial Intelligence series to use interlude tracks (described by writer Tyler Bowles as 'vignettes'); these tracks are titled "Fill" with a seemingly random number suffixed. Muzik described the opening track "Ginger" as having an "almost physical presence," describing it as "[gradually] filling the room". They felt this was reflective of how Paap was a "sound sculptor." "Beam Me Up!" features a medley of melodies and incorporates styles of funk and disco, while "R2 D2" features a choppy intro and is characterised by a light electro beat with synthesizer bleeps and playful, grandiose waves of "machine sound." "Basic Design" introduces the producer's signature drum decay and features a bassline that would become characteristic of early proto-trance compositions. "Pepper" features sweeps of ambient music, and layers a bassline and chopped vocals atop synthesised choir excerpts. Bowles noted the stylistic shift between tracks, "going from the active 'R2 D2' to the technical 'Fill 14' and back to head-bobbing with 'Basic Design'."

== Release and reception ==
Professional ratings
Review scores
Source	Rating
AllMusic	4/5 stars
Select	4/5

Warp Records released Ginger on 21 June 1993, while Plus 8 released the album concurrently in Canada. The Designer's Republic designed the artwork for the Warp version. Paap later described the sleeves of Ginger and his other early albums as incorporating "a typical 'intelligent techno' style." In the United Kingdom, the album reached number 68 on the UK Albums Chart and stayed on the chart for one week; it currently remains Paap's highest-charting album in the UK. In a contemporary review, Rupert Howe of Select magazine praised how Ginger was "only tangentially connected to the here-today-gone-yesterday that plagues club dancefloors." He felt that although the album may sound uneventful on paper, this nonetheless exemplified how "the simplest pleasures are often the hardest to get to grips with."

Reviewing the album retrospectively, Joshua Glazer of AllMusic's Joshua Glazer describes Ginger as finding Paap at "roughly the same point on the growth curve that the Beatles were during Rubber Soul." He wrote that each sound on the album was "magnificently structured, in perfect pitch and timber with every other sound, making Ginger a masterpiece of techno music as audio design." Writing for A Guide to Essential Ambient & Downtempo Albums, Mike Watson described Ginger as "among the finest lounge-room techno or 'electronic listening music' releases of the decade." Glazer describes Ginger as among the first IDM records, writing that it singled a "furtherance from techno's dancefloor mandate" which would soon be adopted by acclaimed acts like the Black Dog and Autechre. In 2014, Fact placed "De-Orbit" at number 9 on its list of the "100 greatest IDM tracks". They described the track as an "important turning point" in the progression between techno and IDM, and commented that Ginger and Paap's other early productions "remain a milestone to this day. What began as techno suddenly began to feel like something else." Dutch trance producer Armin van Buuren cited Ginger as an inspiration on hit hit single "Communication" (1999). Ginger was re-released by Warp on 10 November 2023, and peaked on the UK Dance Albums Chart at number 30 in January 2024.

== Track listing ==
Editions on Warp, Plus 8 and Beam Me Up! all have slightly different track listings. Warp editions include "De-orbit", Plus 8 editions include "Spikkels" and Beam Me Up! editions include neither.

This table shows releases from 1993, with track positions: Warp CD, vinyl and cassette (Europe); Plus 8 CD and vinyl (Canada); Beam Me Up! CD and vinyl (Netherlands); Hot Productions CD (USA).

Title	Duration	WARP CD14	WARP LP14	WARP MC14	+8025 (CD)	+8025 (LP)	BMU 001CD	BMU 001DLP	HTCD 9944
"Ginger"	7:17	1	1.1	A1	1	A1	1	A1	1
"Fill 4"	2:11	2	1.2	A2	2	A2	2		2
"Beam Me Up!"	5:41	3	1.3	A3	11	D2	11	AAAA2	11
"R2 D2"	5:47	4	2.1	A4	3	B1	3	A2	3
"Fill 14"	4:07	5	2.2	A5	4	B2	4	AA1	4
"Jackpot"	1:06	6			5		5		5
"Basic Design"	7:53	7	2.3	A6	6	B3	6	AA2	6
"Perfect Pitch"	7:15	8	3.1	B1	7	C1	7	AAA1	7
"Flashback"	6:02	9	3.2	B2	8	C2	8	AAA2	8
"Fill 15"	2:40	10			9		9		9
"Pepper"	7:42	11	4.1	B3	10	D1	10	AAAA1	10
"De-orbit"	6:12	12	4.2	B4					
"Spikkels"	6:13				12				
"Something for Your Mind"	3:50								12
"Pullover"	5:08								13

All tracks written by Speedy J.

== Personnel ==
Adapted from the liner notes of Ginger

- Jocheem Paap – producing, writing
- Alex Buurman – digital edits

== Charts ==
Chart (1993)	Peak position
UK Albums (OCC)	68

Chart (2024)	Peak position
UK Dance Albums (Official Charts)	30
