= Artificial Intelligence II =

Compilation album by various artists
- Released: 30 May 1994
- Genre: Electronic; IDM
- Length: 95:25
- Label: Warp

Artificial Intelligence series chronology
Incunabula (1993)	Artificial Intelligence II (1994)

Artificial Intelligence II is a compilation album released via Warp on 30 May 1994. It is the eighth and final release in Warp's Artificial Intelligence series. It peaked at number 16 on the UK Compilation Chart.

== Critical reception ==
Professional ratings
Review scores
Source	Rating
AllMusic	4/5 stars
Pitchfork	6.8/10
Rolling Stone	4/5 stars
Spin Alternative Record Guide	9/10

John Bush of AllMusic gave the album 4 stars out of 5, stating that it is "a bit more sonically experimental" than Artificial Intelligence. Mark Richardson of Pitchfork gave the album a 6.8 out of 10, saying: "By 1994 there were a lot of people making 'electronic listening music' and this doesn't feel like a particularly special assemblage of what was out there."

== Track listing ==
Double-disc CD edition
No.	Title	Artist(s)	Length
1.	"Release to the System" (Beaumont Hannant remix)	Mark Franklin	8:37
2.	"Selinite"	The Higher Intelligence Agency	7:01
3.	"Arcadian"	Link	9:32
4.	"Scriptures"	B12	6:58
5.	"Chatter"	Autechre	7:36
6.	"Symmetry"	Speedy J	6:08
7.	"Utuba"	Beaumont Hannant	8:12
8.	"Reality Net"	Richard H. Kirk	6:47
9.	"Parasight"	Balil	7:34
10.	"Spangle"	Seefeel	7:20
11.	"Blipsalt"	Darrell Fitton	9:42
12.	"My Teapot"	Polygon Window	3:58
13.	"Maritime"	Kenny Larkin	6:35
14.	Untitled (separated from track 13 by 5:15 of silence)	Scanner	6:39

Bonus 12" (packaged with initial copies of double-disc vinyl edition)
No.	Title	Artist(s)	Length
1.	"Metalurg" (label lists track length as 'there is no time')	Darrell Fitton	7:19
2.	"Maritime"	Kenny Larkin	6:35

Note

- Tracks 11–14 are excluded from the single-disc CD edition; tracks 13–14 are excluded from the cassette and standard double-disc vinyl editions.

== Charts ==
Chart (1994)	Peak position
UK Compilation Albums (OCC)	16
