= Book of Dogma =

Studio album by The Black Dog
- Released: 2007
- Recorded: 1989–1992
- Genre: IDM
- Length: CD1: 61:15, CD2: 47:58
- Label: Soma Quality Recordings SOMACD057

Book of Dogma is a compilation by IDM artists Ken Downie, Ed Handley and Andy Turner a.k.a. The Black Dog which was released in 2007. The two CDs compile the band's first six EPs, the second CD in fact being a re-release of the 1995 compilation Parallel.

== Track listing ==
CD1

1. "Virtual" - 9:32
2. "Ambience with Teeth" - 5:40
3. "The Weight" - 5:58
4. "The Weight (Liposuction Mix)" - 5:15
5. "Age of Slack" - 4:20
6. "Tactile" - 6:44
7. "Techno Playtime" - 4:06
8. "Apt" - 4:26
9. "Chiba" - 4:15
10. "It Felt Like It" - 3:13
11. "Seer and Sages" - 4:51
12. "Dog Solitude" 2:48

Tracks 1 - 3: originally released as Virtual EP in 1989 (BD 001) Tracks 4 - 6: originally released as Age of Slack EP in 1989 (BD 002) Tracks 7 - 12: originally released as Techno Playtime EP in 1990 (BD 003)

CD2

1. "Parallel" - 5:02
2. "Squelch" - 4:54
3. "Erb" - 5:00
4. "Glassolalia" - 4:54
5. "Hub" - 4:10
6. "Vanttool" - 6:42
7. "Aural Wallpaper" - 3:48
8. "Rainbow Bridge" - 4:08
9. "Virtual Hmmm ..." - 4:37
10. "VIR²L" - 4:38

Tracks 1 - 4: originally released as Parallel EP in 1991 (GenP(X)2)
Tracks 5 - 8: originally released as Vanttool EP in 1992 (GenP(X)9)
Tracks 9 - 10: originally released as VIR²L EP in 1992 (GenP(X)3)
