= Silenced (album) =

Studio album by The Black Dog
- Released: 19 Sep. 2005
- Recorded: 2005
- Genre: IDM
- Length: 59:43
- Label: Dust Science Recordings DUSTSND003

The Black Dog chronology
| Unsavoury Products (2002) | Silenced (2005) | Radio Scarecrow (2008) |

Silenced is the sixth full-length studio album by The Black Dog released in 2005 on CD. It's the first album Ken Downie recorded and produced together with Martin and Richard Dust, owners of the label Dust Science Recordings.
It harks back to Black Dog's debut Bytes, a record that remains a landmark album in electronic music's development. Martin Dust explained: "We never set off to make it like Bytes. My idea was to create something that you could come home to after you'd just been to a club or gig, that would start at the right pace and then just wind down into a great album and just chill out."
Martin Dust had been "friends with Ken for probably nine or ten years. The main connection is that we both had an interest in internet bulletin board systems and punk. I used to run a bulletin board with an old style modem and communication and information file exchange and hacking and stuff, so right from the beginning I've always been talking to Ken, about that, about music, about everything really. We just struck a friendship up like that and swapped music and ideas and continue from there."

== Track listing ==
1. "Trojan Horus (Part 1)" - 5:41
2. "Trojan Horus (Part 2)" - 2:29
3. "Lam Vril" - 4:31
4. "Truth Benders D.I.E" - 3:22
5. "Bolt 23 Blue Screen ov Death" - 0:37
6. "Alt/Return/Dash/Kill" - 3:54
7. "Bolt 777 Ordinary Boy" - 0:41
8. "Drexian City R.I.D.E" - 3:38
9. "Remote Viewing" - 4:34
10. "Gummi Void" - 4:55
11. "Machine Machina" - 1:35
12. "The Stele of Revealing" - 2:56
13. "Songs for Other People" - 2:07
14. "Break Down on Lake Shore Drive" - 1:10
15. "Bolt 33 Glitch and Chin" - 1:03
16. "Sudden Intake" - 5:11
17. "4 3s 555 (Part 1)" - 2:57
18. "4 3s 555 (Part 2)" - 8:13

Composed & produced by Ken Downie, Martin Dust & Richard Dust
Bass on "Remote Viewing" by Webby

== Bite Thee Back EP ==
1. "4 3s 777" - 6:10
2. "Bite Thee Back" - 6:53
3. "Invoke" - 4:10
4. "Evoke" - 4:24

== Trojan Horus EP ==
1. "Trojan Horus (Parts 1 & 3)" - 8:29
2. "D.O.G. Style" - 4:29
3. "Evoke (Carl Taylor Deep in Detroit Mix)" - 5:52

== Remote Viewing EP ==
1. "Remote Viewing" - 5:04
2. "Because They Said So" - 3:48
3. "Mr Burroughs to the Curiosity Phone Please" - 6:17

== The Remixes EP ==
1. "4 3s 555 (Vince Watson Remix)" - 10:42
2. "The Stele Of Revealing (Carl Taylor Remix)" - 7:19
3. "D.O.G. Style (The Black Dog's Late Night Porn Mix)" - 3:55
