= Further Vexations =

Studio album by The Black Dog
- Released: 27 Apr 2009
- Recorded: 2009
- Genre: IDM
- Length: 68:34
- Label: Soma Quality Recordings SOMACD077

The Black Dog chronology
Radio Scarecrow (2008)	Further Vexations (2009)	Music for Real Airports (2010)

Further Vexations is the eighth full-length studio album by The Black Dog released in 2009 on CD and vinyl. It was written and produced by Ken Downie, Martin and Richard Dust.
There is a political dimension to the album, which is revealed through some of the track titles. "'Biomantric L-if-e' and 'You’re Only SQL' hint at the powerful information databases being used by governments in the name of security, while 'CCTV Nation' spells out unequivocally how Britain especially has become a nation under constant surveillance. To complete the picture, the cover shows part of a fingerprint on a backdrop of video surveillance images and electronic voices can be heard saying, among other things, "ID card," "biometric measures," and "computer world" at the end of 'Northern Electronic Soul (Part 2)'.

== Track listing ==
1. "Biomantric L-if-e" - 5:14
2. "93" - 4:34
3. "Phil: Because ov, Indeed" - 0:47
4. "You're Only SQL" - 4:57
5. "We Are Haunted" - 4:00
6. "CCTV Nation" - 4:59
7. "Stempel" - 4:35
8. "Northern Electronic Soul (Part 1)" - 2:54
9. "Northern Electronic Soul (Part 2)" - 3:24
10. "Northern Electronic Soul (Part 3)" - 4:51
11. "Skin Clock" - 6:03
12. "Dada Mindstab" - 5:10
13. "Tunnels ov Set" - 5:11
14. "Later Vexations" - 6:24
15. "Kissing Someone Else's D.O.G" - 5:24

Composed & produced by Ken Downie, Martin Dust & Richard Dust

== Vexing EP ==
1. "0093 (Berlin Mix)" - 7:44
2. "You're Only SQL (BCN Mix)" - 7:25
3. "Plinth" - 2:27

== We Are Sheffield EP ==
1. "Tunnels ov Set (Crookes Mix)" - 7:23
2. "Tunnels ov Set (The Bass Soldier's Manor Top Mix)" - 3:28
3. "Tunnels ov Set (Autechre Remix)" - 7:39
4. "Tripside Syndicate" - 2:45

== The Vexing Remixes EP ==
1. "Northern Electronic Soul (Claro Intelecto Snake Pass Mix)" - 7:15
2. "CCTV Nation (Redshape Analog Mix)" - 7:36
3. "Skin Clock (Silicone Soul Mix)" - 8:30
4. "Kissing Someone Else’s D.O.G (Octogen Nightdrive Mix)" - 7:24
