= Alien Radio =

Alien Radio may refer to:

== Music ==
- "Alien Hits/Alien Radio", a song by Coldplay on the 2024 album Moon Music.
- "Alien Radio/Alien Radio Remixed" albums by Slam released on their Soma Quality Recordings label in 2001/2002.

== Television ==
- "Alien Radio", the first episode of the fifth season from 1995 TV series The Outer Limits.
