= Music for Real Airports =

Studio album by The Black Dog
- Released: 10 May 2010
- Recorded: 2010
- Genre: IDM, ambient, experimental, field recordings
- Length: 58:59
- Label: Soma Quality Recordings SOMACD083

The Black Dog chronology
Further Vexations (2009)	Music for Real Airports (2010)	Liber Dogma (2011)

Music for Real Airports is the ninth full-length studio album by The Black Dog released in 2010 on CD, vinyl and as FLAC file download. It was written and produced by Ken Downie, Martin and Richard Dust. The album's title and concept of sound reference the 1978 ambient release Music for Airports, created by Brian Eno. Despite the similarities, the band mentions in a press release: "Airports have some of the glossiest surfaces in modern culture, but the fear underneath remains. Hence this record is not a utilitarian accompaniment to airports, in the sense of reinforcing the false utopia and fake idealism of air travel. Unlike Eno's Music for Airports, this is not a record to be used by airport authorities to lull their customers. ... While on tour, the Black Dog made 200 hours of field recordings, much of which was processed and combined with new music in the airport itself, waiting for the next flight. This vast amount of content has been slowly distilled into a set of particularly evocative pieces of music."

The album was a collaborative project for art galleries soundtracked by The Black Dog, with visual media created by design studio Human.

== Track listing ==
1. "M1" - 5:12
2. "Terminal EMA" - 5:40
3. "DISinformation Desk" - 5:19
4. "Passport Control" - 3:49
5. "Wait Behind This Line" - 4:10
6. "Empty Seat Calculations" - 3:26
7. "Strip Light Hate" - 3:26
8. "Future Delay Thinking" - 4:21
9. "Lounge" - 0:57
10. "Delay 9" - 4:20
11. "Sleep Deprivation 1" - 4:53
12. "Sleep Deprivation 2" - 6:26
13. "He Knows" - 1:43
14. "Business Car Park 9" - 5:09

Composed and produced by Ken Downie, Martin Dust & Richard Dust

== Thee Lounge EP ==
1. "Gate 21" - 5:29
2. "BCN 4" - 8:57
3. "Surge Collapse" - 1:32
4. "Leeds and Bradford" - 5:42

== Subject to Delays EP ==
1. "Future Delay Thinking (Live)" - 5:28
2. "Strip Light Hate (Aitcho Airfix Refix)" - 5:01
3. "Sleep Deprivation 3" - 6:41
4. "Late Night Cabin Fever (Crying Baby Mix)" - 5:40
