= Unsavoury Products =

Studio album by The Black Dog & Black Sifichi
- Released: 2002
- Recorded: 2002
- Genre: Intelligent dance music
- Length: 65:27
- Label: Hydrogen Dukebox duke097cd

The Black Dog & Black Sifichi chronology
Music for Adverts (and Short Films) (1996)	Unsavoury Products (2002)	Silenced (2005)

Unsavoury Products is the fifth full-length studio album by The Black Dog featuring the Parisian spoken word artist Black Sifichi. It was released in 2002 on CD.

It is meant as a tribute to William S. Burroughs and is inspired by The Black Dog’s collaboration with Burroughs before his death. Ken Downie explained. "We'd sent tapes to William Burroughs, and were waiting for him to deliver some spoken word back to us, but he fell ill, and died. Mr Sifichi sent us a pair of blue underpants he'd found in Paris, so he was the natural person to help us finish off the album. We got on very well, and had a lot of fun making it."

Black Sifichi remembers, "The Black Dog heard my first album with Negative Stencil 'Tick' and I made contact when I heard about their Burroughs project. I thought I could do a 'cameo' reading of one of Bill's texts somewhere on it. Anyway, The Black Dog loved my voice, how it was delivered. After Bill's death a demo of mine inspired them to produce a homage to Burroughs with me. Unsavoury Products has a message... the majority of traditional electronic albums do not. It is a way to use musical aesthetics and seamlessly merge them with words. In many ways the album is closer to art than most music media/products, which are constrained by commercial demands."

At the time of the album's production the band considered itself a "multimedia collective" with members Martin (in charge of creative design and development), Steve Ash (studio production) and Ross Knight (guitar) besides Ken Downie. "We're essentially a collective in the Warhol 'Factory' sense; we float in and out of the group depending on the projects we're working on, independently or together."

According to reviewer John Bush, the album has "a lot in common" with Ken Downie's 1996 album Music for Adverts (And Short Films), and shows "an excellent production sense rooted in dark tribal electronics". In his review for Pitchfork, Paul Cooper describes Unsavory Products as "a fascinating and multi-layered album" that demands undistracted concentration.

== Track listing ==
1. "What Do They Want?" - 2:56
2. "Dogbite" - 4:20
3. "Secret Biscuits" - 3:49
4. "If I Were King" - 3:29
5. "B4 the Sky Was Built" - 3:34
6. "Dear Ron" - 3:03
7. "Invisible Things" - 4:13
8. "Let's Talk Music" - 4:25
9. "Mental Health Hotline" - 2:07
10. "Va Zee" - 1:32
11. "Image Poem" - 2:12
12. "New York Dorx" - 3:03
13. "Someone at the Office" - 3:04
14. "Science Tells Us" - 6:01
15. "Wishing Well" - 4:24
16. "White Feathers" - 1:51
17. "Interview" - 4:00
18. "Voodoo" - 2:17
19. "Inconspicuous Audiometric" - 1:48
20. "Pigeon Chest" - 3:10

Composed by the Black Dog & Black Sifichi, produced by the Black Dog
