= Radio Scarecrow =

Studio album by The Black Dog
- Released: 31 March 2008
- Recorded: 2006–2008
- Genre: IDM
- Length: 69:03
- Label: Soma Quality Recordings SOMACD67

The Black Dog chronology
Silenced (2005)	Radio Scarecrow (2008)	Further Vexations (2009)

Radio Scarecrow is the seventh studio album by The Black Dog released in 2008 on CD and vinyl. It was written and produced by Ken Downie, Martin and Richard Dust.

The album's subject was inspired by Numbers Stations and Electronic voice phenomena (Electronic Voice Phenomena) as explained by Martin Dust: "It’s the fact that people will cling to anything as a belief system that interest me a lot. The album name comes from the kids in the village where I live. There’s a local guy who’s had some kind of breakdown and he walks around with a radio to his ear all the time, they call him Radio Scarecrow."

== Track listing ==
1. "Transmission Start" - 2:52
2. "Train by the Autobahn (Part 1)" - 5:03
3. "Train by the Autobahn (Part 2)" - 6:40
4. "Riphead v9" - 5:21
5. "UV Sine" - 7:43
6. "... Short Wave Lies" - 5:01
7. "Siiiipher" - 3:42
8. "Digital Poacher" - 2:47
9. "Coda" - 2:14
10. "Set to Receive" - 3:51
11. "EVP Echoes" - 4:33
12. "Floods v3.9" - 5:54
13. "Beep" - 3:37
14. "Witches ov" - 3:47
15. "Dials and Dialers 1" - 1:07
16. "Ghost Vexations" - 3:15
17. "Dials and Dialers 2" - 1:32

Composed and produced by Ken Downie, Martin Dust and Richard Dust.

== Riphead EP ==
1. "Riphead v2" - 8:01
2. "Gawble Vianag" - 6:55
3. "Mental Ward Sleep Machine" - 6:22

== Floods EP ==
1. "Floods v3" - 8:54
2. "Floods v3.2 (Surgeon Remix)" - 6:08
3. "Floods v3.1 (The [Bass Soldier] Remix)" - 5:03

== Set to Receive EP ==
1. "Set to Receive" - 5:42
2. "EVP Echoes" - 4:40
3. "Short Wave Lies (Live)" - 5:09

== Detroit vs. Sheffield EP ==
1. "Train by the Autobahn (Robert Hood DJ Remix)" - 5:52
2. "Train by the Autobahn (Part 3)" - 6:18
3. "Train by the Autobahn (Robert Hood's 8 Mile Remix)" - 7:49
4. "Siiiipher (The Bass Soldier's Forgemasters Remix)" - 4:06
