= Music for Adverts (and Short Films) =

Studio album by The Black Dog
- Released: 1996
- Recorded: 1996
- Genre: IDM, techno
- Length: 65:13
- Label: Warp Records PUPCD2

The Black Dog chronology
Parallel (1995)	Music for Adverts (and Short Films) (1996)	Unsavoury Products (2002)

Professional ratings
Review scores
Source	Rating
Muzik	3/5 stars

Music for Adverts (and Short Films) is the fourth studio album by English electronic music project The Black Dog, released in 1996 on double vinyl, cassette, and CD. It was the first without participation by Ed Handley and Andy Turner who left to continue their work as Plaid. The album's title references Brian Eno's 1978 album Music for Films, while its cover art references his 1979 Ambient 1: Music for Airports and 1980 Ambient 2: The Plateaux of Mirror covers.

The album continues Ken Downie's passion for the ancient world and magic. Downie's own favorite tracks came to be "The Wind Spirit" "[...] and 'Euthanasia' because it gives me goosebumps. And 'Kheprit', because it sums up everything about the Black Dog in 7 minutes."

== Track listing ==
1. "Dumb and Dumber" – 1:37
2. "The Wind Spirit" – 2:10
3. "Jordan" – 1:47
4. "Tzaddi" – 4:18
5. "Pod #1" – 1:35
6. "No Lamers" – 4:30
7. "Edgar Allan" – 3:50
8. "Harpo" – 0:39
9. "Strange Hill" – 3:06
10. "The Big Issue" – 3:03
11. "Crayola" – 2:06
12. "Horny" – 1:09
13. "AGW" – 1:22
14. "Seti" – 1:03
15. "Darkness" – 2:58
16. "Euthanasia" – 5:22
17. "Gerry Norman" – 0:57
18. "Meditation No. #4" – 3:41
19. "Stratus" – 1:04
20. "Dissidence" – 1:02
21. "As Clouds Go By" – 1:02
22. "Disench" – 1:30
23. "Minour" – 4:37
24. "Mo" – 3:07
25. "Wot" – 0:33
26. "Kheprit" – 6:52

Composed & produced by Ken Downie.
