= Ambient 4: On Land =

Studio album by Brian Eno
- Released: March 1982
- Recorded: September 1978–January 1982
- Genre: Ambient music
- Length: 44:35
- Label: EG
- Producer: Brian Eno

Brian Eno chronology
My Life in the Bush of Ghosts (1981)	Ambient 4: On Land (1982)	Apollo: Atmospheres and Soundtracks (1983)

Professional ratings
Review scores
Source	Rating
AllMusic	4/5 stars
The Austin Chronicle	3/5 stars
Pitchfork	9.7/10
The Rolling Stone Album Guide	3/5 stars
Spin Alternative Record Guide	7/10
Tom Hull – on the Web	B
Uncut	8/10
The Village Voice	B+
The 405	10/10

Ambient 4: On Land is the eighth solo studio album by Brian Eno, released in March 1982 by E.G. Records. It was the final edition in Eno's Ambient series, which began in 1979 with Ambient 1: Music for Airports. The album was released to critical acclaim and is recognised along with its predecessors as a landmark album in the history of the ambient genre.

== Overview ==
On Land is a mixture of synthesizer-based notes, nature/animal recordings, and a complex array of other sounds, most of which were unused, collected recordings from previous albums and the sessions that created them. As Eno explained, "the making of records such as On Land involved feeding unheard tape into the mix, constant feeding and remixing, subtracting and 'composting'."

In the three-year process of making the album, Eno found that the synthesizer came to be of "limited usefulness" and that his "instrumentation shifted gradually through electro-mechanical and acoustic instruments towards non-instruments like pieces of chain and sticks and stones... I included not only recordings of rooks, frogs and insects, but also the complete body of my own earlier work." Cognizant of the music's deeper aural qualities he said: "On the whole, On Land is quite a disturbed landscape: some of the undertones deliberately threaten the overtones, so you get the pastoral prettiness on top, but underneath there's a dissonance that's like an impending earthquake."

In the liner notes, he suggested listening to the album through "a three-way speaker system that is both simple to install and inexpensive, and which seems to work very well on any music with a broad stereo image", a diagram of which was included.

=== Track names ===
The album makes reference to definite geographical places, such as Lizard Point, the exposed southernmost tip of mainland Britain in Cornwall.

"Tal Coat" refers to Pierre Tal-Coat (Pierre Louis Jacob), a proponent of the French form of abstract expressionism, Tachisme. This interest in painting is reflected in Eno's statement that the album was "an attempt to transpose into music something that you can do in painting: creating a figurative environment. At the beginning of the 20th century, the ambition of the great painters was to make paintings that were like music, which was then considered as the noblest art because it was abstract, not figurative. In contrast, my intention in On Land was to make music that was like figurative painting, but without referring to the history of music – more to a 'history of listening'."

"Lantern Marsh" was a place in East Anglia near where Eno grew up. He remarks: "My experience of it derives not from having visited it (although I almost certainly did) but from having subsequently seen it on a map and imagining where and what it might be."

"Leeks Hills", Eno explains, "is a little wood (much smaller now than when I was young, and this not merely the effect of age and memory) which stands between Woodbridge and Melton. There isn't a whole lot left of it now, but it used to be quite extensive. To find it you travel down the main road connecting Woodbridge and it lies to your left as you go down the hill."

"Dunwich Beach, Autumn, 1960" is named after the once prosperous seaport of Dunwich, Suffolk, which eroded into the sea over a period of three hundred years.

== Track listing ==
All tracks are written by Brian Eno, except "Lizard Point" by Eno, Michael Beinhorn, Axel Gros, and Bill Laswell.

Side one
No.	Title	Length
1.	"Lizard Point"	4:34
2.	"The Lost Day"	9:13
3.	"Tal Coat"	5:30
4.	"Shadow"	3:00

Side two
No.	Title	Length
1.	"Lantern Marsh"	5:33
2.	"Unfamiliar Wind (Leeks Hills)"	5:23
3.	"A Clearing"	4:09
4.	"Dunwich Beach, Autumn, 1960"	7:13
Total length:		44:35

== Personnel ==
- Brian Eno – various electronic, acoustic, and ambient elements
- Michael Beinhorn – synthesizer (track 1)
- Axel Gros – electric guitar (track 1)
- Bill Laswell – bass guitar (track 1)
- Jon Hassell – trumpet (side one, track 4)
- Michael Brook – electric guitar (side two, track 4)
- Daniel Lanois – live equalisation (side two, track 4)

Technical

- Engineering: Andy Lyden (London), Barry Sage, Cheryl Smith, Daniel Lanois (Canada), John Potoker (NYC), Julie Last (NYC), Martin Bisi (Brooklyn), Neal Teeman (NYC)
- The frogs on track 6 were recorded in Choloma, Honduras by Felipe Orrego.
- Special thanks: Robert Quine, Alex Blair, Harold Budd, Laraaji and Daniel Lanois "who contributed their encouragement and suggestions at the right times"
- Mastered by Greg Calbi at Sterling Sound, New York
- Artwork, design, and text: Brian Eno
- Typography: Chong-Donnie

== Versions ==
Country	Label	Cat. no.	Media	Release date
US	Editions EG	EGED 20	LP	1982
France	Polydor	2311 107	LP	1982
Australia & NZ	Editions EG	2311 107	LP	1982
UK	Editions EG	EEGCD 20	CD	1986
UK	Virgin	ENOCD 8; 7243 8 66499 2 8	CD	2004

== In popular culture ==
- "Mistaken Memories of Mediaeval Manhattan" is a 1981, 47-minute ambient video created by Eno which uses music from the album (cat # HEN 2134). Two time-lapse animated GIFS from the production – (133K), (270K).
  This title was later repackaged with his Thursday Afternoon video as "14 Video Paintings", RykoDisc, (HNDVD 1508) 9, 10.
- The Khumba Mela (Same as it Ever Was), A 1982 90-minute video filmed in the waterways of Kashmir in India about a Saddhu's pilgrimage by Albert Falzon, features music from the album (Hendring, HEN 2135) 11, 12, 13, 14.
- Mythological Lands – Symbols from the Magic Drum, by David Bickley, a film about Lapland (1990, 45 minutes) features music from the album 15, 16, 17.
- Ocean of Sound, a book by David Toop, has been accompanied by a 2-CD compilation including "Lizard Point" (Virgin AMBT 10; 7243 8 41367 2 7) 18, 19, 20.
- OHM: The Early Gurus of Electronic Music 1948–80 (Ellipsis Arts, 2000) features the track "Unfamiliar Wind (Leeks Hills) 21.
- Shutter Island, (2010, Paramount Pictures) a film directed by Martin Scorsese, features the track "Lizard Point" as a part of its soundtrack.

== See also ==
- Ambient 1: Music for Airports
- Ambient 2: The Plateaux of Mirror
- Ambient 3: Day of Radiance
- Ambient music
- Electronic music
