= Liber Dogma =

Studio album by The Black Dog
- Released: 31 Oct 2011
- Recorded: 2011
- Genre: Techno, IDM
- Length: 58:11
- Label: Soma Quality Recordings SOMACD092

The Black Dog chronology
Music for Real Airports (2010)	Liber Dogma (2011)	Tranklements (2013)

Liber Dogma is the tenth full-length studio album by The Black Dog, released in 2011 on CD and vinyl. It was written and produced by Ken Downie, Martin, and Richard Dust.
The album "represents a radical shift toward dry minimalism, where the beat is pushed to the fore, served by pulsating bass lines and only a sprinkle of additional sounds for each piece. Closer by nature to Berlin’s minimal and hypnotic techno than to Detroit’s more luxurious sound, Liber Dogma has been devised with one aim and one aim only: the dance floor."
The title of the final track is in Japanese, read as "Kā Kurasshu Majutsu" and meaning loosely "car-crash sorcery". On streaming services, the title has been translated to "Car Crash Magick".

== Track listing ==
1. "Dark Wave Creeping" - 5:23
2. "The Death ov the Black Sun" - 3:08
3. "Steam Caliphate" - 2:44
4. "Drop Kick Kali" - 3:08
5. "Eden 353" - 3:34
6. "Black Maria" - 4:43
7. "Single Light Focus" - 5:10
8. "Silent Escape" - 5:40
9. "Hype Knot 7" - 4:45
10. "Bird Siren" - 5:12
11. "Feeder Rub Out" - 4:18
12. "Worship: The Drum" - 5:25
13. "カークラッシュ魔術" - 4:56

Composed & produced by Ken Downie, Martin Dust & Richard Dust

== Liber Kult (Book 1 ov 3) ==
1. "Black Chamber Order" - 7:49
2. "Bass Mantra" - 6:17

== Liber Temple (Book 2 ov 3) ==
1. "Heavy Industry" - 7:43
2. "Greedy Gutter Guru" - 5:06

== Liber Nox (Book 3 ov 3) ==
1. "High Rise Choir Reprise" - 7:44
2. "Dissident Bleep" - 6:53

== Liber Chaos (Book ov Aiwass) ==
1. "Dissident Bleep (Sandwell District Remix)" - 6:18
2. "Black Chamber Order (Blawan Remix)" - 5:45
3. "High Rise Choir Reprise (Sigha Remix)" - 6:27
4. "Heavy Industry (Shifted Remix)" - 8:34
5. "Greedy Gutter Guru (Richard H. Kirk Remix)" - 6:03
6. "Bass Mantra (Perc Remix)" - 6:02
