= Time Tourist =

Studio album by B12
- Released: April 1996
- Genre: IDM, techno, ambient
- Length: 55:59
- Label: Warp

B12 chronology
Electro-Soma (1993)	Time Tourist (1996)	3EP (1998)

Professional ratings
Review scores
Source	Rating
Allmusic	link
Muzik	4.5/5 stars

Time Tourist, or TimeTourist, is an album released by B12 in 1996 on Warp. The inventive packaging for the album makes it appear as if TimeTourist is an educational computer game written in a dystopian year 2166 and which looks back on the late 20th century as a primitive and quaint time in the development of mankind.

The track title "VOID/Comm" refers to "VOID/Comm R&D", a fictional 22nd-century company whose "B12 Systems" division developed "WorldCOM", a shared-mind technology which frees humans from physical interpersonal contact and the need to use very much of their brains. "VOID/Comm" is likely in reference to the Voigt/Kampf test administered in Blade Runner. The album's packaging makes reference to a number of other science fiction names corrupted over two centuries — Phettt (Boba Fett), Hein Len (Robert A. Heinlein), Seaclarc (Arthur C. Clarke), A.C Mov (Isaac Asimov), and Kaydich (Philip K. Dick) — as well as to the Roddenberry and Lucas "Sacred StarTexts".

Although the featured artist for the album is B12, on the packaging, each track is associated with one of B12's aliases: CMetric, Redcell, or Musicology.

== Track listing ==
1. "VOID/Comm" – 5:50
2. "Infinite Lites" – 5:21
3. "Cymetry" – 5:58
4. "Gimp" – 7:21
5. "DB5" – 1:42
6. "Phettt" – 5:52
7. "Epillion" – 7:08
8. "Scriptures" – 6:58
9. "The Silicon Garden" – 3:29
10. "Radiophonic Workshop" – 6:20
