= Electro-Soma =

Studio album by B12
- Released: 29 March 1993
- Genre: Ambient techno; IDM
- Length: 67:08
- Label: Warp
- Producer: Mike Golding; Steve Rutter

B12 chronology
Electro-Soma (1993)	Time Tourist (1996)

Artificial Intelligence series chronology
Bytes (1993)	Electro-Soma (1993)	Dimension Intrusion (1993)

Professional ratings
Review scores
Source	Rating
AllMusic	5/5 stars
Select	4/5

Electro-Soma is the debut studio album by British electronic music duo B12. It was released on Warp on 29 March 1993 and is the fourth release in Warp's Artificial Intelligence series. Some of the album's tracks had been previously released on the duo's own B12 Record label under their pseudonyms Musicology, Redcell, and Cmetric. Thus, Electro-Soma functions more as a compilation of some their earliest material than as a proper full-length LP, much like Incunabula by Autechre.

The vinyl release includes the exclusive track "Drift", but excludes the tracks "Debris", "Satori", and "Static Emotion", present on the CD release. A limited edition vinyl release also exists on orange vinyl. Although not noted on the case or booklet, the US compact disc distribution on Wax Trax! Records/TVT Records includes "Drift" as well as all 12 tracks originally included on the UK Warp compact disc.

== Track listing ==
All tracks are written by Mike Golding and Steve Rutter.

Warp UK CD release
No.	Title	Length
1.	"Soundtrack of Space"	4:04
2.	"Hall of Mirrors"	6:38
3.	"Mondrin"	6:42
4.	"Obsessed"	5:48
5.	"Bio Dimension"	5:53
6.	"Basic Emotion"	4:51
7.	"Metropolis"	4:56
8.	"Obtuse"	7:22
9.	"Telefone 529"	4:09
10.	"Debris"	8:39
11.	"Satori"	5:49
12.	"Static Emotion"	2:27

Warp UK vinyl/streaming services release
No.	Title	Length
1.	"Soundtrack of Space"	4:04
2.	"Hall of Mirrors"	6:38
3.	"Mondrin"	6:42
4.	"Obsessed"	5:48
5.	"Bio Dimension"	5:53
6.	"Basic Emotion"	4:51
7.	"Metropolis"	4:56
8.	"Obtuse"	7:22
9.	"Telefone 529"	4:09
10.	"Drift"	4:04

Wax Trax!/TVT US CD release
No.	Title	Length
1.	"Soundtrack of Space"	4:04
2.	"Hall of Mirrors"	6:38
3.	"Mondrin"	6:42
4.	"Obsessed"	5:48
5.	"Bio Dimension"	5:53
6.	"Basic Emotion"	4:51
7.	"Metropolis"	4:56
8.	"Obtuse"	7:22
9.	"Telefone 529"	4:09
10.	"Drift"	4:04
11.	"Debris"	8:39
12.	"Satori"	5:49
13.	"Static Emotion"	2:27

== Personnel ==
B12

- Mike Golding – mixing, production, recording, sequencing
- Steve Rutter – mixing, production, recording, sequencing

Additional personnel

- The Designers Republic Eclectroset – design
- Percival – artwork
