= Bytes (album) =

Studio album by Black Dog Productions
- Released: 8 March 1993
- Genre: Electronic, IDM
- Length: 67:35
- Label: Warp
- Producer: Black Dog Productions

The Black Dog chronology
Bytes (1993)	Temple of Transparent Balls (1993)

Artificial Intelligence series chronology
Surfing on Sine Waves (1993)	Bytes (1993)	Electro-Soma (1993)

Bytes is the debut studio album by the English electronic music group the Black Dog, credited under the name Black Dog Productions. It was released on Warp on 8 March 1993.

The record entered the Dance Albums Chart at No. 1 on 27 March 1993. The music is produced by the members of the group – Ed Handley, Andy Turner, and Ken Downie – under various aliases, including Plaid, Close Up Over, Xeper, Atypic, I.A.O., Discordian Popes and Balil. Black Dog Productions is also the name of their own record label.

According to Slant Magazine, the album was "a watershed in what has become known in the U.K. as IDM or 'intelligent techno.'"

== Release ==
Bytes was released on the Sheffield techno label Warp on 8 March 1993. The members of the Black Dog collaborated on the album in various combinations with pseudonyms. An early version of "Clan (Mongol Hordes)" appears on Artificial Intelligence as "The Clan".

The record entered the Dance Albums Chart at No. 1 on 27 March 1993.

== Music ==
The album draws influence from Detroit artists such as Derrick May. The album also makes use of odd time signatures.

The album's tracks have been described as "headphone-friendly."

== Critical reception ==
Professional ratings
Review scores
Source	Rating
AllMusic	5/5 stars
NME	8/10
Record Collector	4/5 stars
Select	5/5 medals
Slant Magazine	3/5 stars
Uncut	8/10
Vox	8/10

In 2002, Slant Magazine placed Bytes at number 23 on its list of "The 25 Greatest Electronic Albums of the 20th Century". Bytes has been cited as a landmark album of intelligent dance music. The album would later influence the European ambient and hardcore techno scenes.

== Track listing ==
No.	Title	Artist	Length
1.	"Object Orient"	Plaid	5:44
2.	"Caz"	Close Up Over	6:15
3.	"Carceres Ex Novum"	Xeper	6:43
4.	"Focus Mel"	Atypic	7:13
5.	"Olivine"	Close Up Over	4:45
6.	"Clan (Mongol Hordes)"	I.A.O.	6:24
7.	"Yamemm"	Plaid	6:15
8.	"Fight the Hits"	Discordian Popes	6:20
9.	"Merck"	Balil	4:34
10.	"Jauqq"	Close Up Over	5:47
11.	"3/4 Heart"	Balil	7:33
