= Temple of Transparent Balls =

Studio album by The Black Dog
- Released: 6 September 1993
- Recorded: 1993
- Genres: IDM, ambient techno
- Length: 62:16
- Label: General Production Recordings (GPR) GPRCD1

The Black Dog chronology
Bytes (1993)	Temple of Transparent Balls (1993)	Spanners (1995)

Temple of Transparent Balls is the second album by Ed Handley, Andy Turner and Ken Downie, the first under the name The Black Dog, and was released on double vinyl, cassette and CD in 1993. It continued to delight their hardcore followers but confused many with its complexity and inaccessibility. “From the opening digital skank of ‘Cost I’ to the closing circuit board tears on ‘The Crete that Crete Made,’” critic Peter McIntyre wrote, it “took every single strand of modern music, mixed it all up and produced something that sounded like nothing else on the planet.”
The second effort had been recorded at Techno Island Studio, the sonic forge of R&S Records, during an extended stay in Ghent, Belgium. "Temple is filled with tinker toy melodies and drunken electronics, at times astray in a sad metropolis or jumping for joy in a sonic junkyard of the future."
Mr. C of The Shamen rated it as the best electronic album ever made.

== Track listing ==
1. "Cost I" - 5:07
2. "Cost II" - 6:33
3. "4.7.8." - 6:11
4. "The Actor and the Audience" - 5:19
5. "Jupiler" - 4:41
6. "Kings of Sparta" - 4:13
7. "Sharp Shooting on Saturn" - 6:41
8. "Mango" - 5:36
9. "Cycle" - 7:13
10. "In the Light of Grey" - 5:22
11. "The Crete that Crete Made" - 5:12

Composed & produced by Ken Downie, Ed Handley & Andy Turner
