= Spanners (album) =

Studio album by The Black Dog
- Released: 16 January 1995
- Studio: Black Dog Towers
- Genre: IDM
- Length: 75:40
- Label: Warp

The Black Dog chronology
Temple of Transparent Balls (1993)	Spanners (1995)	Parallel (1996)

Spanners is the third studio album by English electronic music group The Black Dog. It was released via Warp on 16 January 1995. It peaked at number 30 on the UK Albums Chart.

== Critical reception ==
Professional ratings
Review scores
Source	Rating
AllMusic	5/5 stars
Entertainment Weekly	B+
The Guardian	4/4 stars
Mojo	4/5 stars
NME	9/10
Q	4/5 stars
Record Collector	5/5 stars
Select	3/5
Uncut	7/10
Vox	7/10

Ned Raggett of AllMusic praised Spanners, saying, "The highlights are many, most often achieving a solid combination of dancefloor friendliness and unexpected sonic trickery." David Browne of Entertainment Weekly described it as "a series of antiseptic, hypnosis-inducing machine burbles, but with just the right amount of jarring elements to keep listeners awake." Shana Ting Lipton of CMJ New Music Monthly called it "an epic journey through life in the modern world."

In 2017, Spanners ranked at number 42 on Pitchfork's list of "The 50 Best IDM Albums of All Time".

== Track listing ==
All tracks are written by Ken Downie, Ed Handley and Andy Turner

No.	Title	Length
1.	"Raxmus"	3:03
2.	"Bolt 1"	0:27
3.	"Barbola Work"	6:42
4.	"Bolt 2"	0:27
5.	"Psil-Cosyin"	10:32
6.	"Chase the Manhattan"	5:42
7.	"Bolt 3"	1:36
8.	"Tahr"	3:08
9.	"Bolt 4"	1:06
10.	"Further Harm"	6:18
11.	"Nommo"	6:53
12.	"Bolt 5"	0:22
13.	"Pot Noddle"	7:13
14.	"Bolt 6"	0:42
15.	"End of Time"	3:44
16.	"Utopian Dream"	6:00
17.	"Bolt 7"	0:17
18.	"Frisbee Skip"	5:25
19.	"Chesh"	6:03
Total length:		75:40

== Charts ==
Chart (1995)	Peak position
Scottish Albums (OCC)	35
UK Albums (OCC)	30
