= Artificial Intelligence (series) =

Series of albums

Artificial Intelligence is a series of albums by Warp Records released from 1992–1994 to exhibit the capabilities and sounds of electronic music. Warp described the new (post-rave electronic) music as "electronic listening music" to clarify that it was meant more for the mind than the body. The sleevenote on the 1992 compilation said "Are you sitting comfortably? Artificial Intelligence is for long journeys, quiet nights and club drowsy dawns. Listen with an open mind." The series is remarkable for its inclusion of groups and individuals who later became leaders in modern electronic music, techno, and ambient, such as Alex Paterson, Plaid, Richard D. James, Richie Hawtin, and Autechre. Every album in the series, aside from Dimension Intrusion, has its name enclosed in parentheses on its cover.

== Releases ==
- Artificial Intelligence (1992) – various artists
- Surfing on Sine Waves (1993) – Polygon Window
- Bytes (1993) – Black Dog Productions
- Electro-Soma (1993) – B12
- Dimension Intrusion (1993) – F.U.S.E.
- Ginger (1993) – Speedy J
- Incunabula (1993) – Autechre
- Artificial Intelligence II (1994) – various artists
- Motion (video) – various artists

== Background ==
When asked about the series in a 2016 interview with online electronic music journal Resident Advisor, Sean Booth of Autechre said that,

I dunno, I didn't come up with Artificial Intelligence. You'd have to ask [Warp founder] Rob Mitchell and he's not around any more! I think it was a joke, really. There was a definite tongue-in-cheek thing going on with the AI series initially, everyone knew it was a bit silly. But we were enjoying doing it. Thing is, almost all the artists on that first AI compilation are just like us, they were regular kids, they're not intelligent people particularly. Richard [D. James] is a fucking blagger, Richie Hawtin too... I don't know how the fuck he gets away with the things he does! Alex Paterson, people like that, they're not known for being intellectually powerful, they're just fucking good musicians.

Each of the albums was released on vinyl, cassette and CD; each of the artist albums was also released on limited edition coloured or transparent vinyl. The video release Motion, released on VHS (and LaserDisc in Japan), mostly contained tracks from Artificial Intelligence II. Each release except Ginger was distributed in the United States by TVT/Wax Trax! Records.
