= Parallel (The Black Dog album) =

Studio album by The Black Dog
- Released: 1995
- Recorded: 1991/1992
- Genre: IDM
- Length: 47:58
- Label: General Production Recordings (GPR) GPRCD15

The Black Dog chronology
| Spanners (1995) | Parallel (1995) | Music for Adverts (and Short Films) (1996) |

Professional ratings
Review scores
| Source | Rating |
|---|---|
| AllMusic | 3/5 stars |
| The Encyclopedia of Popular Music | 4/5 stars |

Parallel is a compilation album by the intelligent dance music artists Ken Downie, Ed Handley and Andy Turner, aka The Black Dog. It was released in 1995 on double vinyl and CD. The album compiles three EPs released on the GPR label in 1991 and 1992.

== Critical reception ==
AllMusic wrote that there's "some quality material, but without the integrated feel of their other full-length works." BBC Music called Parallel a "landmark," writing that the remastered title track included on the Book of Dogma collection "is blinding as ... layers of light and reflective sound form an expansive multi-tonality."

== Track listing ==
1. "Parallel" - 5:02
2. "Squelch" - 4:54
3. "Erb" - 5:00
4. "Glossolalia" - 4:54
5. "Hub" - 4:10
6. "Vanttool" - 6:42
7. "Aural Wallpaper" - 3:48
8. "Rainbow Bridge" - 4:08
9. "Virtual Hmmm ..." - 4:37
10. "VIR²L" - 4:38

Tracks 1 - 4: originally released as Parallel EP in 1991 (GenP(X)2)
Tracks 5 - 8: originally released as Vanttool EP in 1992 (GenP(X)9)
Tracks 9 - 10: originally released as VIR²L EP in 1992 (GenP(X)3)
Composed and produced by Ken Downie, Ed Handley and Andy Turner
