= B12 (band) =

British electronic music duo

- Origin: Ilford, Essex, England
- Genres: Ambient techno, IDM
- Years active: 1990–present
- Labels: B12 Records, Warp Records
- Members: Mike Golding; Steven Rutter
- Website: b12records.com

B12 are a British electronic music duo consisting of Mike Golding and Steve Rutter. First appearing in the early 1990s under a variety of monikers, including Musicology, Redcell and Cmetric, their sound is associated with the early 1990s ambient techno and IDM scene. They released their debut album Electro-Soma (1993) on Warp Records, and also founded the independent label B12 Records. Recurring themes of science fiction and futurism can be found in nearly all B12 releases.

== History ==
Golding and Rutter met in the late 1980s through a mutual appreciation of the techno sound coming out from Detroit from artists such as Juan Atkins and Derrick May. Upon seeing the success of Plus 8 Records in early 1990, they were inspired to do the same, and in 1991 founded B12 Records as an outlet for the music they and their friends Kirk Degiorgio (a.k.a. As One), and Steve Pickton (a.k.a. Stasis), were producing. Writing under various monikers they released a series of 12" vinyl records, each with a limited run of coloured vinyl, and messages hand-etched into the run-out grooves.

The duo's sound was comparable to that of Detroit techno, having been inspired by Detroit artists Juan Atkins and Derrick May. This was compounded by the signature style of their initial releases on their own imprint B12 Records, limited editions on coloured 12" vinyl with cryptic messages etched into the run-out grooves, and the fact that Golding and Rutter tended to shy away from the press, and rarely gave interviews, which added to the mystery of their identities.

In 1992, B12 appeared on the Rephlex compilation The Philosophy of Sound and Machine, and the Warp Records Artificial Intelligence Volume I compilation, alongside Aphex Twin, Autechre, The Black Dog, and Richie Hawtin. A full-length album Electro-Soma followed in 1993, a compilation of tracks from early B12 Records releases, as part of Warp's continuing Artificial Intelligence series.

B12 continued to release records on their own imprint, and also released a pair of split releases in conjunction with 'A.R.T. (Applied Rhythmic Technology)', a label run by their friend Kirk Degiorgio.

In 1996 their second full length Time Tourist was released on Warp, with artwork by The Designers Republic, featuring a painting by Trevor Webb of a futuristic London. The album contained mostly new material, although the track "Scriptures" had been previously released in 1994 on the Artificial Intelligence II compilation.

Both Electro-Soma and Time Tourist were re-released in the United States on the Wax Trax!/TVT label.

Also in 1996, B1215 (the unlucky 13th release on B12 – cat. numbers 12 and 13 were never used) was pressed, but only a handful of white label promo copies were ever released. This was to be the last release on B12 Records for over a decade. Due to the limited numbers pressed of each release, original B12 vinyl is sought after by collectors and can change hands for large amounts of money.

In 1998, 3EP was released on Warp Records, a tribute to Jazz musicians Dave Brubeck, Joe Morello, and Ron Carter (each track was named after them). The EP was not released in the United States. After 3EP's release, B12 retracted from public space without explanation, and were not heard of or seen again until 2005.

A number of poor-quality illegal bootlegs of old B12 material began circulating in late 2004, claiming to be represses. Obviously not cut from the original plates (they were missing the etched messages in the run-out grooves), it is thought they were probably taken from recordings of the old vinyl, or ripped from CD. Whether or not this was the reason B12 reappeared is not known.

In 2005, Golding and Rutter announced they were restarting B12 Records, and would be making available the complete back catalogue, remastered, on a 12 disc CD box set. They began playing live shows again, and a new Redcell track, titled "Back From The Edge" appeared on a limited CD series on Seed Records.

In June 2007, the full release of 1996's B1215 and new material B1216 was announced, staying with the limited edition coloured vinyl format with etched messages in the run out grooves.

In May 2008, B12 released their third album (their first album in 12 years) called Last Days of Silence. Electro-Soma was reissued alongside the compilation album Electro-Soma II in 2017.

== Discography ==
Title	Format	Label	Catalog number	Year	Notes
Musicology (recorded as Musicology)	EP	B12 Records	B1201	1991	Ltd. run of 650 black vinyl, 300 clear vinyl
Space Age EP (recorded as 2001)	EP	B12 Records	B1202	1991	Ltd. run of 700 black vinyl, 300 orange vinyl
Outlook (recorded as Musicology)	EP	B12 Records	B1204	1992	Ltd. run of 500 black vinyl, 500 green vinyl
Redcell (recorded as Redcell)	EP	B12 Records	B1205	1992	Ltd. run of 700 black vinyl, 300 purple vinyl
Hall of Mirrors (recorded as Musicology)	EP	B12 Records	B1206	1992	Ltd. run of 700 black vinyl, 300 yellow vinyl
Retreat From Unpleasant Realities (recorded as Redcell)	EP	B12 Records	B1207	1992	Ltd. run of 200 black vinyl, 150 red vinyl, 150 blue vinyl
Interim Outerim (recorded as Redcell)	EP	B12 Records	B1208	1993	Ltd. run of 700 black vinyl, 300 white vinyl
Electro-Soma	Album	Warp Records	WARPCD09	1993	Part of the Artificial Intelligence series
Prelude	Compilation	B12 Records	B1209	1993	Ltd. 500 copies CD, 500 copies cassette.
Cmetric (recorded as Cmetric)	EP	B12 Records	B1210	1994	Ltd. run of 900 black vinyl, 100 pink vinyl
untitled (recorded as Redcell)	EP	B12 Records / ART Records	B1214.1	1995	Split release with A.R.T Records
untitled (recorded as Redcell)	EP	B12 Records / ART Records	B1214.2	1995	Split release with A.R.T Records
Time Tourist	Album	Warp Records	WARPCD37	1996	
3EP	EP	Warp Records	WAP102	1998	
Practopia EP (recorded as Redcell)	EP	B12 Records	B1215	2007	1st edition ltd. run of 700 black vinyl, 300 red vinyl 2nd edition ltd. run of 500 black vinyl
Slope EP	EP	B12 Records	B1216	2007	1st edition ltd. run of 700 black vinyl, 300 blue vinyl 2nd edition ltd. run of 500 black vinyl.
32 Line Up EP	EP	B12 Records	B1217	2007	
Last Days of Silence	Album	B12 Records	B1219	2008	
Bokide 325	EP	Soma Records	SOMA431	2015	
Orbiting Souls	EP	Delsin Records	113DSR	2015	
Transient Life	EP	DE:Tuned	ASG/DE009	2016	
All Abandon All	EP	Central Processing Unit	00100100	2016	
Broken UnBroken	EP	FireScope Records	FS001	2016	
Deceased Unknown	EP	FireScope Records	FS002	2016	
Electro-Soma II	Album	Warp	WARP LP9X	2017	
