= Slam (DJs) =

Scottish producer/DJ duo

Slam are a Scottish producer/DJ duo from Glasgow, Scotland, consisting of Stuart McMillan (born 1966, Glasgow) and Orde Meikle (born 1964, Oxford). They are co-founders of Soma Quality Recordings. Their music style consists of house and techno.

== History ==
McMillan and Meikle's first club event was a weekly Thursday night called Black Market, in the Glasgow club, Fury Murrys. They played a mix of house, funk and rap which attracted a cool arty student crowd, predominantly from Glasgow's West End.

In early 1988, they were approached by Steven Sleepman (aka Steven Workman), a Black Market regular, after he heard his first acid house track on a late night radio show. Sleepman passionately wanted to run a night that played this new sound and secured a Saturday night at Glasgow's Tin Pan Alley, which was to become the inaugural home of Slam.

Dave Clarke, an original founding partner of Black Market ran PR with Sleepman for both nights. Prior to the launch of her musical career Dot Allison (a future musical collaborator) worked with the PR team, and DJ Harri was a regular guest on the turntables.

Slam Events (McMillan, Meikle, Clarke and Sleepman) then quickly launched their third night on Fridays at the Sub Club called Joy. Black Market still kept its own musical identity throughout the Second Summer of Love, playing an eclectic mix of musical genres.

In 1990, Tennent's Lager’s marketing agency approached Slam with a sponsorship deal to tour Scotland's underground clubs over a period of two years. Sleepman had just left Slam, but came back on board to manage the two-year tour and direct creative. The tour ultimately led to the creation of the Tennent's-owned festival T in the Park and Slam's annual residency there.

Slam have released singles since the mid-1990s, including "Positive Education", "Eterna" and "Lifetimes". They co-founded Soma Quality Recordings in 1991, along with label boss Dave Clarke. More recently, Slam Events was launched – a subdivision of Soma that deals mainly with the promotion of Slam and Slam nights. Slam were the resident DJs at Pressure, a monthly event promoted by Soma and Slam Events which occurred on the last Friday of every month at The Arches in Glasgow, which was later relocated to SWG3 and rebranded as Maximum Pressure after The Arches nightclub was closed in 2015. They also have a residency at the Sub Club in Glasgow at another Soma and Slam Events night called Return to Mono. They have also been resident DJs at Fabric in London. Over recent years Slam have curated and played in the Slam Tent, at T in the Park, and they have appeared on BBC Radio 1's "Essential Mix" six times between 1994 and 2008, as well as appearing at Bestival in 2008.

== Discography ==
- Snapshots (Soma, 1995)
- "Positive Education" (Remixes)" (2x12") (Soma, 1995) - UK No. 44 (2001)
- Headstates (Soma, 1996)
- "Past Lessons" / "Future Theories" (Distinctive Breaks, 2000)
- Alien Radio (Soma, 2001)
- Alien Radio Remixed (Soma, 2002)
- Slam in America (DMC, 2002)
- Fabric 09: Slam (Fabric, 2003)
- Year Zero (Soma, 2004)
- Nightdrive (Resist, 2005)
- Ekspozicija 4 (Explicit Musick, 2006)
- Human Response (Soma, 2007)
- "Maffaking" / "Last Sonic Approach" (single) (Drumcode Records, 2010)
- "Cacophony" (single) (Drumcode Records, 2010)
- "Crowded Room" (single) (Drumcode Records, 2011)
- "Area 51" (single) (Drumcode Records, 2011)
- "Vespula" (single) (Drumcode Records, 2012)
- "Movement" (single) (Drumcode Records, 2013)
- "Astrolabe" (single) (Soma Records, 2013)
- Machine Cut Noise (album) (Soma Records, 2016)
- Dark Channel (album) (Soma, 2025)

== Remixes ==
- "Drive" — Daft Punk
- "Burnin'" — Daft Punk
- "Chronologie 6" — Jean-Michel Jarre
- "Close Your Eyes" — Dot Allison
- "Mothership Reconnection (Star Child)" — Parliament
