= Black Sifichi =

- Born: New York
- Citizenship: American
- Occupations: Spoken word artist and writer

Black Sifichi is a Scottish / American spoken word artist and writer born in New York City and who now lives in Paris, France. He has recorded albums with a multitude of artists, including "Unsavoury Products" and "Genetically Modifidied" with The Black Dog.

He co-wrote the cult hit "Versus" with the group EZ3kiel. Recent releases are "Lost-Wax" with The Floating Roots Orchestra and "The Uncertain Trail" and "Floating Roots" with Lena. "Ashes to Ashes - Dub to Dub", "Spoken Dub Manifesto Vol 1." and a fourth album, Burning Before Sunset (TBR in March 2010 on Jarring Effects records) with Brain Damage the duo from Saint-Étienne, France. In 2008 Sifichi recorded two tracks for Barry Adamson's label Central Control for the album Our Moon is Full with Strings of Consciousness led by Philippe Petit.

== DJing ==
Sifichi is also a DJ who began mixing at Paris' Radio Libertaire 'Wreck This Mess', and then at Radio Nova in sharing a bi-monthly slot with DJ Morpheus. One week Morpheus with the 'Freezone' mix and another week 'Sub Para Dub'. Sub Para Dub was also re-broadcast on Couleurs 3 in Switzerland. Sub Para Dub eventually had its own weekly place in the grill.

Sifichi now produces a 2 hour long weekly radio program entitled 'Audiometric' which is a mix of contemporary, abstract, experimental, dub, digi-dub, hip-hop, breakbeat, neo-jazz, post-rock... (a broad rage of music 'actuel') is broadcast on Aligre FM 93.1 in Paris, Jet FM in Nantes, Radio Grenouille in Marseille, Eko des Garrigues in Montpellier, and on RTF, Limoges. He has mixed in multiple festivals across France and Europe, and was a resident at Paris' Batofar, What's Up, Flêche D'Or, and Cithea.

== Photography ==
Sifichi is also a photographer and has been exhibiting at the gallery 'Cabinet D'Amateur' in Paris and in London's 'Flexitron' in Islington. He was awarded a Bourse from the city of Paris for his photography on contemporary sculpture in the public sectors of Prague, Edinburgh and Paris which is now it the collection of the European Maison de la Photography. He shared first prize for a Time Out magazine reporter award. Recent publications are '400ml" = 400 Graffiti Artists from Around the World Customize the Spraycan' (Kitchen 93 publishers) - Livraison Revue d'art special edition compiled by Pierre Belouin "Soundtracks for the Blind", and the cover photography for 'La Plinthe' by Mathias Delplanque on Optical Sound Records & Fine Arts.

== Performances ==
With Norscq he created performances for their stoner-psyche-free-DIY duo "Super Stoned" which uses costume, music and video. Ghedalia Tazartes accepted a rare invitation to work with Super Stoned for a performance at the L'Étrange Musique festival in Paris. Ghedalia decided to take on the name of Black Sifichi for the day and Black became Ghedalia. Sifichi also regularly works with the 7 member group 'Tempsion' led by Frederic Temps. A double LP called T.N.R.T.B.T.M.E was released in 2010 on the L'Étrange Sonothèque label.

Sifichi has also performed live with Norscq, Simon Fisher Turner, Mathias Delplanque, Olivia Louvel, Paul Kendall, Oldman, Rob Mazurek, Tim Whelan, Christian Vialard, Rodolphe Burger, David Thomas, Ghedalia Tazartes, Alain Bashung, UHT, Rainier Lericolais, Edward Perroud, Mohamed Roubhi, Ez3kiel, Carlo Brandt, Steve Arguelles, Cyril Atef, Bart Plantenga, Nicolas Marmin (aka bondage), Didier Calléja, Olivier Cadiot, DJ Mute, Wide Open Cage, Rachid Taha, the duo 2 Kilos & More and the duo BlackNox (Black Sifichi/Gerome Nox)

== Film ==
Sifichi narrative skills have been used for the films "Hear me, children yet-to-be-born" by Sandy Amerio, "Dial H-I-S-T-O-R-Y" by Johan Grimonprez and the 2009 short film 'Les Songes D'Edmee" by Jerome Lefdup.

== Radio, vocals, video ==
Radio productions include 'Wet Dreams of The Pope' text by Bart Plantenga and Black Sifichi for Dutch National Radio,'Pamplemousse by Yoko Ono' directed by Helena Villovitch for Radio France And Locked Out vs RBS for Radio Creation day.

In October 2009 Sifichi created the electronic and vocal work "Reaching For The Centre of Your Mind" (text and sound) for the Centre Georges Pompidou and Optical Sound records.

Sifichi has also made the full length video "Twist Over" with visual artist Roma Napoli with texts by Paul Lafargue. Another film entitled "Escape" which creates the strong effect of falling, "The Fly", "Scrolls : Volumes 1 & 2" and provides the visuals for Lena and The Floating Roots Orchestra.

== Discographie ==
- 2kilos &More - Exempt - Ant-Zen, Audiotrauma, Le Label Beige (DL, Vinyl, CD) fev 2020
- DEF - Re-Cover (Sybaritic & Militant Songs) - Ant-Zen records (DL)
- Vox Museum - Sandra Moussempes & Black Sifichi - Editions Jou (DL)
- Philippe Petit & Black Sifichi - The Bedded - M-Tronic (DL)
- Tempsion - The Golden Program-mm - L'Etrange Sonothèque June (Vinyl / DL) 2019
- Brain Damage - Combat Dub 4 - The Remixes - Jarring Effects (cd/vinyl) April 2019
- Rith Banney & Black Sifichi - Original Sin - Grimy Grooves records USA - DL iTunes, Juno ... (May 2018)
- Quattrophage & Black Sifichi - 'Florida Jour 2' - nostalgie de la boue - compilation (March 2018)
- Post-Gradiva (la bande son du livre "Colloque des Télépathes") avec Sandra Moussempes - Editions de L'Attente (Sept 2017)
- Paradis Noir - Cream - Optical Sound records / vinyl picture disc par Tom de Pekin (Avril 2017)
- Destroyer of Naivetés – Black Sifichi & Rhys Chatham & Joseph Nechvatal – Entr’acte records #207 – Sept 2016
- Doctor Flake ‘Six’ / feat BS on ‘Listen To The Ground – New Deal (distribution Differ-ant ) – March 2016
- La Machine Couchée / Regis Boulard – Radio France – Signature – Oct 2015
- BlackNox – ‘we don’t believe in heaven…’ 500 limited édition white vinyl – Optical Sound Records – Sept 2015
- BlackNox – ‘we don’t believe in heaven…’ 300 cds Emmetrop – Sept 2015
- CitySonic 2015 ‘A Sound Art Compilation’ – Quattrophage feat BS – ‘Brutal Sketch’ – Transonic records – Sept 2015
- 2kilos &More – Lieux-Dits, Ant Zen – CD – March 2015
- 2kilos &More – Lieux-Dits, Satanic Royalty – Vinyl – April 2015
- Best of 2014 on Trip Hop Net – Stamp – ‘Oppression’ feat BS – track number 1 on this DL compilation.
- Re: Residual – « Clusters » – Peter Knight's 2010 Residual album remix – Parenthesis Records – DL
- Stamp – Stamp – ‘Oppression’ feat BS autoprod mixé par Patrick Muller. CD & digital, avril 2014
- 2kilos &More, TEN, double cd Remixes & Live feat Black Sifichi, Audiophob Records dec 31 2013
- Music For Death, 300 limited édition red vinyl Optical Sound Records & Fine Arts, sept 2013
- Olivier Mellano, How We Tried a New Combination of Notes to Show The Invisible, (3 cd+DVD) Naïve Classique
- 2kilos &More, Kurz Vor5, Audiophob mai 2012
- Versus, Mister Blue (The Letter feat BS), Sound Sculpture recs (mai 2012)
- Mélodies Lunatiques, Franck Dadure ‘Le Fakir’, Signature / Radio France (avril 2012)
- High Damage, High Damage, (Braintone feat BS), Jarring Effects (avril 2012)
- This Is A Velvet Underground Song I'd Like to Sing, Rodolphe Burger, Derniere Bande (mars 2012)
- R Zatz, Cruel Summer (Dark Brown Eyes feat BS), Jarring Effects Recs (mars 2012)
- Elastik, Critik, (Insomniak feat BS), Koma Records
- Doctor Flake, Flake Up, (Aorta feat BS) New Deal Records (sept 2011)
- Chlorine Free, Start Fresh (Zero Eight Hundred feat BS), Dunose Productions (mai 2011)
- Tempsion, There Is No Reason To Believe That Music Exists, 2xCD, Etrange Musique (mars 2011)
- Shake, Rattle Roll! Radio Creation Day 2009, Limited Edition book & cles USB (2010)
- Brain Damage featuring Black Sifichi, Burning Before Sunset, Jarring Effects (mars 2010)
- Elastik, Metalik, Sounds Around (2010)
- A Tribute To Madness, Thierry Arnold and Black Sifichi (Never Ask Twice), MIS records (2009)
- Candy Goddess par Congopunq aka Cyril Atef, Underdog records (2008)
- UHT°, Ghist Forest Remixes (Kyoto Blues w/ BS), No Fridge Records
- Weace, ‘Emergency Supply Kit’, compilation, Supadope Records (2007)
- Lost-Wax, Lena & The Floating Roots Orchestra, Plush Recs (2007)
- Strings of Consciousness, Our Moon Is Full, Central Control (2007)
- Too Hot Globally, Black Sifichi & Thierry Arnold, compilation Cristel records (2007)
- Mouvement Magazine CD audio special edition SLAM, ‘Expand’, Melodic / Canal 93 / Mouvement (2006)
- Next To Nothing : A Collection of Tuxedomoon Covers, ‘7 Years’, Compilation Optical Sound (2006)
- Tempsion, ‘DVD, Live at L’Etrange Musique, Cinématèque de Paris’, Sordide Sentimental
- Riyaz Master, ‘The Next Room’, Thisco records (2006)
- Gregsky, Villa Mystique, ‘Sat a Lite Skye’, Cristel records (2006)
- Awan, Siguawini, Spemki, / Catalogue + CD co-edition Frac Alsace, Language Plus, Optical Sound (2006)
- Spoken Dub Manifesto, Brain Damage, ‘Sterile’, Jarring Effects records (2006)
- Root 70 ‘Heaps Dub’ the Best of Flanger & Burnt Friedman, ‘Revivitator, Tongs of Love’, Nonplace (2006)
- Fear The Windows (LP), 1 Kilo of Black Bondage, Ronda / Wallace Records (2006)
- Lena, Floating Roots, ‘Storm Blowin’, Quatermass (2005)
- Tempsion, ‘Rectifier’, Devil Drum de Space & Sleepin Fire Etrange Sonoteque / Night & Day
- Ez3kiel, Versus Tour Live DVD, « Versus » Jarring Effects (2005)
- Super Stoned « OH », 12″ vinyl Jarring Effects (2003)
- Wide Open Cage feat Black Sifichi ‘Roaming Through Grande Garabagne’, 12″ e.p. Expressilon records (2003)
- Aka_Bondage & Black Sifichi = Pagan Touch (e,mail mix) compilation Festival Electoni[k]a 3 (2003)
- 24:7 Danny Howells = The Black Dog & Black Sifichi « Invisible Things » Mescalitos remix (vinyl & cd) Global Underground
- Aka_bondage & Black Sifichi = Pagan Touch (e-mail mix) compilation les Disques du Lieu Unique (2003)
- Ez3kiel, Barbary, featured on tracks « Obsesd » & « Versus » Jarring Effects (2003)
- Gnawa Njoum Experience, « Barika / Red Eyes » No Fridge records (2003)
- Genetically Modified, Unsavoury Products remixed by CJ Bolland, 808 State, Laub, Jim Cauty, A1 People....(vinyl & cd)
- Hydrogen Dukebox (2003)
- Super Stoned « Open », 3″ CD Subetage Records Vienna (2002)
- Unsavoury Products (LP) = The Black Dog + Black Sifichi Hydrogen Dukebox (2002)
- Lavatron.X, Norscq remixed 2xCD compilation, ‘Tin / Wells Remix’ Shambala (avril, 2002)
- Pas Attendre 2 x cd compilation, ‘U Wonder’ Shambala (mars 2002)
- How Do You Sleep’ 2 x cd, ‘Pingmonster’ with BXT Jarring Effects (fev, 2002)
- How Do You Sleep 2 x cd, ‘Illicit Illusion’ with UHT Jarring Effects (fev, 2002)
- Pic de Pollution, UHT, ‘Ventoline’ Black Tambour (2001)
- Burnt Friedmann Plays Love Songs, ‘Tongs of Love’ Nonplace records (2001)
- Soul Bondage Deluxe, ‘Spatio Dynamic Theme’, Dum Dum Boys Vicious Circle (2001)
- State of The Union, 3 cd compilation produced by Elliott Sharp Electronic Music Foundation (2001)
- Monologue One with Gerome Nox, Moloko Recs (2001)
- Desolation Angels: Never Turn Back, Cache Cache & Uls Trio – produit par Charles Toberman (2000)
- Tick, Black Sifichi & Negative Stencil (full album) Noise Museum (1999)
- Radio Emits Itself vols. 1,4 with Bart Plantenga M.F.S. (auto-prod 1998–2000)
- Free Radical Oxygen, Book and audio cassette Deviation Syndicate (1998)
- Octopus Magazine Sampler (1999)
- The Last Eccentrics with Erik Yaeger, Quotidiennemente, Sculptured Sounds (1995)
- Future Dub Volume 1, compilé avec Seb Broquet et Jean-François Bizot, Nova Records (1988)
