= Ambient 3: Day of Radiance =

- Original cover. Certain CD pressings opt for a zoomed-in portion of the cover art.

Studio album by Laraaji
- Released: August 1980
- Genres: Ambient; world; new age
- Length: 49:00
- Label: Editions EG
- Producer: Brian Eno

Laraaji chronology
Celestial Vibrations (1978)	Ambient 3: Day of Radiance (1980)	I Am Ocean (1981)

Brian Eno chronology
Fourth World, Vol. 1: Possible Musics (1980)	Ambient 3: Day of Radiance (1980)	My Life in the Bush of Ghosts (1981)

Professional ratings
Review scores
Source	Rating
AllMusic	4/5 stars
Louder than War	8/10
Record Collector	4/5 stars
Sputnikmusic	4.0/5
Tom Hull – on the Web	B+

Ambient 3: Day of Radiance is an album by the American ambient musician Laraaji (alias Edward Larry Gordon), which was produced by Brian Eno.

== Overview ==
This album is the third entry of Eno’s Ambient series, which began in 1978 with Music for Airports followed by The Plateaux of Mirror. Eno encountered Laraaji as a street busker playing in Washington Square Park in 1979.

Compared to the rest of the series, Day of Radiance features very little in the way of electronics. Laraaji uses a variety of acoustic stringed instruments such as a hammered dulcimer and 36-stringed open-tuned zither, with treatments by Eno.

== Content ==
The first three tracks are variations on a theme named "The Dance", and are delivered in a fast, hypnotic, gamelan-like, rhythmic pace on a hammered dulcimer. The final two tracks ("Meditation 1 & 2") are more in keeping with the "ambient" style featured on the rest of the series. These are slow, meandering beatless compositions performed on the zither with occasional dulcimer.

== Track listing ==
All tracks are written by Laraaji.

Side one

1. "The Dance #1" – 9:06
2. "The Dance #2" – 9:39
3. "The Dance #3" – 3:15

Side two

1. "Meditation #1" – 18:42
2. "Meditation #2" – 7:50

== Personnel and instruments ==
- Cover art and production – Brian Eno
- Music – Laraaji
- Instruments – treated and amplified zither; hammered dulcimer

== Versions ==
Country	Label	Cat. No.	Media	Release date
UK	Ambient/EG Records	EGAMB 003	LP	1980
US	EG Records	EGS 203	LP	1980
US	Caroline	1573	CD	?
US	EG Records	EGED/EEGCD-19	LP & CD	1987 & 1995
