= Laraaji =

American multi-instrumentalist (born 1943)

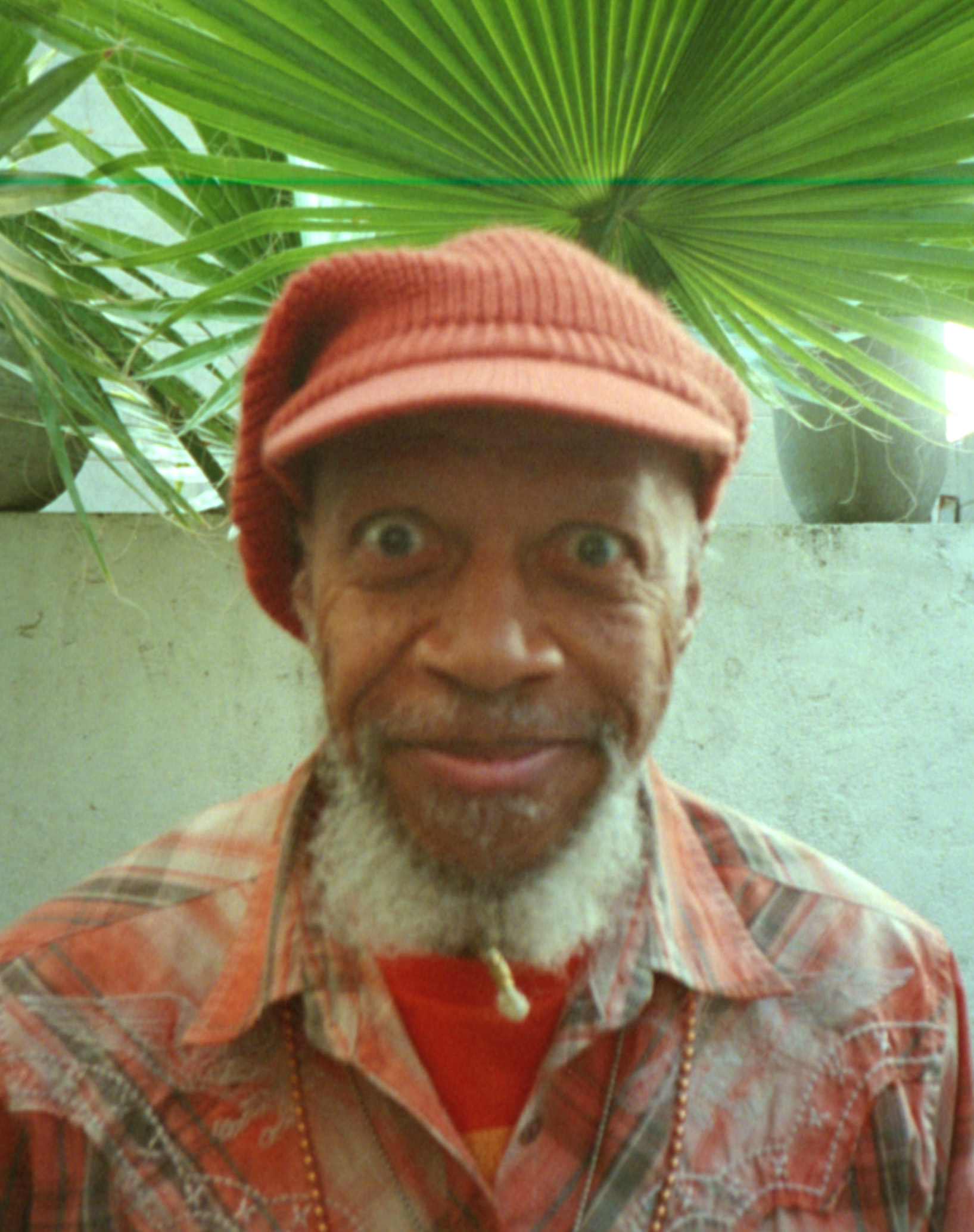
- Laraaji in 2025

Background information
- Also known as: Laraaji Venus Nadabrahmananda
- Born: Edward Larry Gordon; 3 May 1943 (age 83); Philadelphia, United States
- Genres: Ambient; new age
- Occupation: Musician
- Instruments: Zither, hammered dulcimer, piano, violin, music sequencer, keyboards
- Years active: 1979–present
- Website: laraaji.blogspot.com

Edward Larry Gordon (born 3 May 1943), known professionally as Laraaji, is an American multi-instrumentalist specializing in piano, zither and mbira. His albums include the 1980 release Ambient 3: Day of Radiance, produced by Brian Eno as part of his Ambient series and the 1992 release "Flow Goes The Universe", produced by Michael Brook.

== Early life and career ==
Born Edward Larry Gordon in Philadelphia, he studied violin, piano, trombone and voice in his early years in New Jersey. He attended Howard University, a historically black university in Washington, D.C., where he studied composition and piano. After studying at Howard, he spent time in New York City pursuing a career as a stand-up comedian and actor, as well as playing Fender Rhodes electric piano in a jazz-rock band Winds of Change.

In the early 1970s, he began to study Eastern mysticism and believed he had found a new path for his music and his life. It was also at this time he bought his first zither from a local pawn shop. Converting it to an electronic instrument, he began to experiment using the instrument like a piano. By 1978, he developed enough skill to begin busking in the parks and on the sidewalks of New York. He favored the northeast corner of Washington Square Park, where he would improvise for hours on end with his eyes closed.

The following year he was encountered by Brian Eno while playing in Washington Square Park, who went on to produce his most widely recognized release, Ambient 3: Day of Radiance, the third installment of Brian Eno's Ambient series. This was his first album released under the name of Laraaji.

This international exposure led to requests for longer versions of his compositions which he supplied to meditation groups on cassette tapes. It also resulted in an expansion of his mystic studies with such gurus as Swami Satchidananda and Shri Brahmananda Sarasvati, founder of the Ananda Ashram in Monroe, New York.

In 2022, Laraaji joined with Medicine Singers—a group of Native American ritual performance artists in partnership with other artists—to play on their self-titled album.

Laraaji started the Laughter Meditation Workshops, which he still presents around the globe.

In 2025, Laraaji sang and played zither and tablet on Big Thief's album Double Infinity.

He played zither, percussion, mbira and kalimba on the Marty Supreme (2025) soundtrack.

== Critical reception ==
In 2023, Pitchfork awarded Segue to Infinity "Best New Reissue" and declared that the album "should definitively put a nail in the coffin of the narrative of Laraaji as a street busker who was simply “discovered” by (Brian) Eno, instead cementing him as an preeminent figure in ambient and new-age music's history."

== Discography ==
- Celestial Vibration (Swan, 1978) – under the name Edward Larry Gordon
- Lotus-Collage (Laraaji, 1979)
- Ambient 3: Day of Radiance (Editions EG, 1980) – produced by Brian Eno
- I Am Ocean (Celestial Vibration, 1981)
- Unicorns in Paradise (Laraaji, 1981)
- Rhythm N' Bliss (Third Ear, 1982)
- Om Namah Shivaya (Celestial Vibration, 1984)
- Sun Zither (Laraaji, 1984)
- Vision Songs – Vol .1 (self release, 1984)
  - Reissued in 2018 by The Numero Group
- Open Sky (Celestial Vibration, 1985) – with Brother Ah
- Live at WNYC (Laraaji – 1985)
- One – All Loving One (Laraaji – 1985)
- Celestial Realms (Spirit Music, 1986) – with Lyghte a.k.a. Jonathan Goldman
- Once Upon a Zither (Laraaji – 1986)
- Essence/Universe (Audion, 1987)
- Music for Films III (Opal, 1988) – various artists
- Zither Bliss (Laraaji – 1987)
- White Light Music (Laraaji – 1987)
- Urban Saint (Laraaji – 1987)
- Sol (Laraaji – 1987) – with Mark Kramer
- Freeflow – I'm in Heaven (Celestial Vibration, 1980s)
- I Am Healing (Celestial Vibration, 1980s) – with Shree Vena
- I Am Loved (Laraaji – 1980s)
- I Am Sky (Laraaji – 1980s)
- Bring Forth (Your Highest Vision) (Laraaji – 1980s)
- Selected New Music III (Clear Music, 1991) – various artists
- Flow Goes the Universe (All Saints Records, 1992) – produced by Michael Brook
- The Way Out Is the Way In (All Saints Records, 1995) – with Audio Active
- Islands (Sine – 1995) – with Roger Eno
- Cascade(a.k.a. Enlighten) (Relaxation Co. – 1997)
- Divination/Sacrifice (Meta 1998) – with Bill Laswell
- Celestial Reiki (Etherean – 2000) – with Jonathan Goldman
- Shiva Shakti Groove (Collective – 2000)
- Celestial Zone (Laraaji – 2002)
- My Orangeness (VelNet – 2002)
- Celestial Reiki II (Etherean – 2002) – with Jonathan Goldman and Sarah Benson
- Water & Soft Zither (Laraaji – 2004)
- Laughter: The Best Medicine (Laraaji – 2004)
- Chakra Balancing Music (Laraaji – 2004)
- In a Celestial Water Garden (self release, 2005)
- Sonic Sketches (with Nadi Burton – 2006)
- Song of Indra (with Phil Gruber – 2006)
- Ambient Zither in G Pentatonic (Laraaji – 2007)
- Mountain Creek Water (Laraaji – 2007)
- Sonic Portals (Laraaji – 2008)
- FRKWYS Vol. 8 (Blues Control and Laraaji – 2011)
- Two Sides of Laraaji (Laraaji - 2013)
- Sun Gong (Laraaji - 2017)
- Bring On The Sun (Laraaji - 2017)
- Arrive Without Leaving (Flying Moonlight, 2018) (with Arji OceAnanda & Dallas Acid)
- Dreams of Sleep and Wakes of Sound (Laraaji, Merz, Shahzad Ismaily - 2019)
- Sun Piano (Laraaji - 2020)
- Moon Piano (Laraaji - 2020)
- Through Luminous Eyes (All Saints Records, 2020) cassette only, available as triple cassette boxset with Sun Piano and Moon Piano.
- Circle of Celebration (NOUS with Laraaji and Arji OceAnanda - 2021)
- Segue To Infinity (Numero Group, 2023) – includes Celestial Vibration (1978) "with three discs of early, unreleased material, all produced around the same time"
- Glimpses of Infinity (Numero Group, 2024) - "condensed version" of Laraaji's 2023 boxset Segue to Infinity

=== With others ===
- Automatic (Gyroscope, 1994) – as part of Channel Light Vessel
- Excellent Spirits (All Saints Records, 1996) – as part of Channel Light Vessel
- Medicine Singers (Stone Tapes & Joyful Noise Recordings, 2022)

== See also ==
- List of ambient music artists
