= Artificial Intelligence (compilation album) =

Compilation album by various artists
- Released: 6 July 1992
- Genres: IDM; ambient techno
- Length: 52:22
- Label: Warp

Artificial Intelligence series chronology
Artificial Intelligence (1992)	Surfing on Sine Waves (1993)

Artificial Intelligence is a compilation album released by Warp Records on 6 July 1992. It is the first release in Warp's Artificial Intelligence series, and helped create the genre that became known as intelligent dance music.

== Music and artwork ==
The staff of GQ India said of the style present on Artificial Intelligence: "Here was dance music you could listen to at home, like a rock album." According to Warp co-founder Steve Beckett, the album was primarily intended for sedentary listening rather than dancing, and this was reflected in the album art. He said:

You could sit down and listen to it like you would a Kraftwerk or Pink Floyd album. That's why we put those sleeves on the cover of Artificial Intelligence – to get it into people's minds that you weren't supposed to dance to it!

According to Ben Cardew of Pitchfork: "Artificial Intelligence saw [Warp artists] unite in the service of otherworldly melody, mechanical beats that reach beyond the demands of the dance floor, and waves of chilling ambience and production skills that nod to Detroit techno without resorting to slavish reproduction."

== Artwork ==
The cover artwork depicts an android smoking in an armchair with the albums Autobahn (1974) and The Dark Side of the Moon (1973) at its side. The album's interior sleeve contains the text: "Are you sitting comfortably? Artificial Intelligence is for long journeys, quiet nights and club drowsy dawns. Listen with an open mind."

== Critical reception and legacy ==
Professional ratings
Review scores
Source	Rating
AllMusic	5/5 stars
Pitchfork	8.8/10
Spin Alternative Record Guide	8/10
Encyclopedia of Popular Music	5/5 stars

Critic Simon Reynolds cited Artificial Intelligence as a key ambient techno release in a 1994 write-up for The New York Times. In a retrospective review for AllMusic, critic John Bush praised Artificial Intelligence as "a superb collection of electronic listening music." In 2014, Daniel Montesinos-Donaghy of Vice described it as "an exercise in re-training the ear." The following year, Tegan O'Neil of The A.V. Club wrote: "Although every producer on it would go on to have a long and storied career, the album's music is satisfying enough on its own terms."

In 2014, Rolling Stone included Artificial Intelligence on its list of "The 40 Most Groundbreaking Albums of All Time", citing its formative role in the development of intelligent dance music (IDM). According to The Guardian's Ben Cardew, the album "birthed" the IDM genre and "changed the idea of electronic music as merely a tool for dancing".

In 2017, Pitchfork placed it at number ten on its list of "The 50 Best IDM Albums of All Time". Staff writer Ben Cardew explained: "The origins of most musical genres are steeped in legend, obfuscation, and mystery. With IDM, however, the starting point is easy to finger: It emerged from Artificial Intelligence, a compilation album released by Sheffield’s Warp Records in 1992 that promised—on its cover, no less—“electronic listening music.” That might not sound like a revolutionary idea today but, at the time, the notion that you might sit down and listen to “rave” (as it was still widely known) was novel."

In 2023, British GQ placed it at number three on its list of the ten best electronic albums of all time. The staff of GQ India stated that the album "in fact reorientated electronic music forever, spawning the complicated tag Intelligent Dance Music and helping to mainstream home electronic listening and ambient music."

== Track listing ==
No.	Title	Artist(s)	Length
1.	"Polygon Window"	The Dice Man	5:12
2.	"Telefone 529"	Musicology	4:11
3.	"Crystel"	Autechre	4:38
4.	"The Clan"	I.A.O	5:08
5.	"De-Orbit"	Speedy J	6:13
6.	"Preminition"	Musicology	4:04
7.	"Spiritual High"	UP!	7:43
8.	"The Egg"	Autechre	7:32
9.	"Fill 3"	Speedy J	3:42
10.	"Loving You Live"	Dr Alex Paterson	4:01
