= Ambient 1: Music for Airports =

Studio album by Brian Eno
- Released: February 1979
- Recorded: December 1978
- Studios: London and Cologne
- Genres: Ambient; minimalist; electronic
- Length: 42:20
- Labels: E.G.; Polydor; PVC
- Producer: Brian Eno

Brian Eno chronology
Music for Films (1978)	Ambient 1: Music for Airports (1979)	Ambient 2: The Plateaux of Mirror (1980)

Ambient 1: Music for Airports is the sixth studio album by the English musician Brian Eno. It was released in February 1979 through E.G. Records and Polydor Records. It was the first Eno album released under the label of ambient music, a genre intended to "induce calm and a space to think" while remaining "as ignorable as it is interesting". While not Eno's earliest entry in the style, it is credited with popularising the term.

The album consists of four compositions created by layering tape loops of keyboard instruments and voices at differing lengths, and was designed to be continuously looped as a sound installation, with the intent of defusing the anxious atmosphere of an airport terminal as an alternative to "canned" Muzak and easy listening styles.

In 2004, Rolling Stone credited Music for Airports with defining the ambient genre. In 2016, Pitchfork ranked it the greatest ambient album of all time. Eno followed it with Ambient 2: The Plateaux of Mirror (1980), Ambient 3: Day of Radiance (1981) and Ambient 4: On Land (1982).

== Background ==
In January 1975, Eno was hospitalised after a car accident. While he recovered at home, his friend Judy Nylon brought him an album of classical harp music and set it playing quietly against the sound of the rain against the window. The sound blended with the rain outside, unable to get up and adjust the volume, Eno allowed it to create an ambience aligned with his fluctuating attention. The experience inspired his album Discreet Music (1975). Though he had not yet coined the term "ambient music", Eno wrote later that he considered Discreet Music his first ambient work.

After spending several hours waiting for a flight at Cologne Bonn Airport and becoming annoyed by its atmosphere, Eno conceived the notion of a soothing soundtrack to be played in airports and other situations. He considered ambient music "more a concept than a genre" at the time, mostly created against the context of Muzak. Eno's concept was distinct from elevator music and easy listening's "derivative" background noise approach, and was instead to be used as a means of creating space for thought. In the album's liner notes, Eno explained:

Whereas the extant canned music companies proceed from the basis of regularising environments by blanketing their acoustic and atmospheric idiosyncrasies, Ambient Music is intended to enhance these. And whereas their intention is to `brighten' the environment by adding stimulus to it (thus supposedly alleviating the tedium of routine tasks and levelling out the natural ups and downs of the body rhythms) Ambient Music is intended to induce calm and a space to think. Ambient Music must be able to accommodate many levels of listening attention without enforcing one in particular; it must be as ignorable as it is interesting.

Eno also named the Ray Conniff Singers and the "Borgesian idea" of a self-generated "world in reverse", centred around music, as inspirations.

== Recording and composition ==
[Eno] was in part striving to create music that approximated the effect of visual art. Like a fine painting, these evolving soundscapes don't require constant involvement on the part of the listener. They can hang in the background and add to the atmosphere of the room, yet the music also rewards close attention with a sonic richness absent in standard types of background or easy listening music.

— Linda Kohanov of AllMusic

Eno began work on Music for Airports while producing the 1977 David Bowie album Low in Berlin. In the studio of the German producer Conny Plank, he recorded individual notes sung by three female German singers. After returning to England, Eno recorded Fred Frith on guitar and Robert Wyatt on piano. Eno turned the recordings into tape loops. Eno said the album was "conceived as deliberately austere and unemotional" and "was essentially made by machines".

With regards to their instrumentation, dynamic range, timbre, harmony, tonality and texture, the tracks are confining and feature a "contained repertory of pitches, gestural shapes, and motivic content that lasts throughout [their] entirety". Variations of timbre are seen when comparing the tracks, such as the warm "1/1" contrasting with the cold and dark "1/2". They are based on irregular repetition rather than a perceptible pulse.

Not wanting the album to be "all bright and cheerful", Eno, a nervous flyer, considered the feelings that arise from being at an airport, including a supposed mortality salience, and hoped the album would bring solace: "Really, it's music to resign you to the possibility of death". John L. Waters described the album as a "logical progression from the work of the experimental and systems-based 'serious' musicians (John White, Gavin Bryars, Christopher Hobbs, Michael Parsons, Michael Nyman) that Eno recorded and championed for his label Obscure". David Stubbs noted similarities to the work of Satie.

"1/1", features piano loops performed in an arrhythmic manner – piano being the dominant instrument throughout the album. The track arose from two pianists improvising whereby neither could clearly hear the other, leading to separate yet complementary melodies being played. Various motifs, played in a fitful manner, are featured. Philosopher of art John Lysaker, while discussing the album's general sense of aimless direction, noted that "1/1" "holds together no better (and no worse) than a cloud". (Note: Szabo further theorised on the perceived direction, noting that juxtaposed with the album's function it evokes a "distance from human affairs", as does the aversion to musical conventions and abstract replication of a map.) The music throughout is down-tempo, without "distinct melodic or harmonic development[;] no highs or lows". "1/1" is the only track to feature a melody.

"2/1" and "1/2" make use of vocal loops; the former designed to have them fluctuate in synchrony. The disparate lengths of "2/1" were the result of each singer's differing capabilities. He modified the tape recordings offhandedly to loops, desiring "a silence at least twice as long as the sound" and "complicated rather than simple relationships". "And then I started all the loops running, and let them configure in the way they chose to configure". Music professor Victor Szabo described the track as "ghostly", writing that the "non-vibrato" tape loops are "uncannily lifeless": "Through such compositional techniques and affective-expressive codes, ‘2/1' intimates human absence more overtly than any other track".

"2/2" was performed with an ARP 2600 synthesiser. Brian Eno described how this piece was recorded:

[...] The second piece on the second side of Music for Airports was done with an ARP 2600. It's a beautiful sound, I think, and one that I couldn't have got from any other synthesizer that I know of. The thing that makes it so luscious is that it's slowed down, and it has three kinds of echo on it.

== Critical reception ==
Professional ratings
Review scores
Source	Rating
AllMusic	5/5 stars
Christgau's Record Guide	B
Mojo	4/5 stars
Pitchfork	9.2/10 (2004); 10/10 (2024)
Record Collector	4/5 stars
Rolling Stone	4/5 stars
The Rolling Stone Album Guide	4/5 stars
Slant Magazine	4/5 stars
Spin Alternative Record Guide	4/10
Uncut	10/10

The first album of ambient music to become popular – and later recognised as the "first deliberately 'ambient' recording" – it was initially dismissed by critics, audiences and some of Eno's peers alike, bewildering some of the former. Eno said critics felt he had "abandoned the 'true flame' of passionate, rebellious rock 'n' roll for something that was variously described as 'cold', 'emotionless', 'dull', “tuneless', 'comfortable' and 'muzak'." The term "Eno-esque" became a pejorative in NME reviews. It became more favoured by the 1990s, having "entered the modern musical canon".

Blandness was a common critique in the initial reviews, a possible by-product of its unvarying and populist conception, wrote Szabo. In a 1979 review for Rolling Stone, Michael Bloom found Music for Airports self-indulgent and lacking focus, writing: "There's a good deal of high craftsmanship here. But to find it, you've got to thwart the music's intent by concentrating." In another contemporary review for The Village Voice, Robert Christgau wrote that "these four swatches of modestly 'ambient' minimalism have real charms as general-purpose calmatives. But I must also report that they've fared unevenly against specific backgrounds." He later called it "a bore". Writing for The Globe and Mail,around the time of its release, Alan Niester categorised the album as alien, calling it "background grunge" that was best suited for "dish-doing [and] bed-making". In a 1979 interview with Eno for Musician, Lester Bangs described Music for Airports as having "a crystalline, sunlight-through-windowpane quality that makes it somewhat mesmerising even as you half-listen to it". He said it induced him into a dream featuring the jazz musician Charles Mingus.

In a retrospective review for PopMatters, John Davidson deemed Music for Airports a masterpiece whose value "can only be appreciated by listening to it in a variety of moods and settings. Then you are likely struck by how the music allows your mind the space to breathe, and in doing so, adapts itself to your mood." The AllMusic reviewer Linda Kohanov stated that "like a fine painting, these evolving soundscapes don't require constant involvement on the part of the listener [...] yet the music also rewards close attention with a sonic richness absent in standard types of background or easy listening music." Sasha Frere-Jones wrote that, by strength of its compositions, Music for Airports fails to facilitate an easily disregarded listening experience: "the album is too beautiful to ignore".

Sal Cinquemani of Slant Magazine described the effect of the compositions as "sheer weightlessness." Q described it as "soothing and sublime, a useful album when you're feeling particularly delicate". Pitchfork's Grayson Haver Currin wrote that "to hear Music for Airports as more than a background balm, these four tracks remain wondrous and transformative, able to rearrange the air in a room". Another Pitchfork critic, Mark Richardson, said that while Music for Airports was "pretty", its "leading" nature was distracting and the ubiquity of similar vocal treatments in new age music had lessened its impact.

=== Legacy ===
Music for Airports was included in the book 1001 Albums You Must Hear Before You Die. Chuck Eddy from Spin later named it the fourth-most essential ambient album. In September 2016, Pitchfork named it the best ambient album of all time.

The album has been recognised as a seminal and influential release, an icon of the genre and Eno's discography. J. D. Considine wrote in The Rolling Stone Album Guide that it defined and named the ambient aesthetic. Chris Richards of The Washington Post wrote that it "taught an entire generation of musicians to consider music as a texture". Jon Caramanica called it the best of Eno's work which shortly followed Roxy Music. Eno followed it with Ambient 2: The Plateaux of Mirror (1980), Ambient 3: Day of Radiance (1981) and Ambient 4: On Land (1982).

Due in part to Music for Airports, perception of Eno's career shifted and he became aligned with influential minimalist composers including Steve Reich, Philip Glass, Terry Riley and La Monte Young. Artists such as Pauline Oliveros, Riley and Harold Budd expanded on Eno's style of ambient music, which would feature prominently on his following albums; Music for Airports acted as a genesis for Eno and collaborators exploring the style, such as in the numbered Ambient series (1978–82). His conception would soon become more mallable and less reliant upon locations. Music For Airports has sold more than 200,000 copies, making it one of Eno's best-selling solo albums.

=== Installation and covers ===
The album has been installed and performed in at least five airports; it has been met with resistance from some travellers and workers, who deem it disruptive. Clinics and hospitals have used the albums to soothe patients. In 1998, the American contemporary classical ensemble Bang on a Can performed the album live, favouring a "technicolour style". Discussing their performance, Eno described it as the ensemble "trying to act like machines, but they don't sound like machines at all, they sound like people and it's quite touching when that appears". He felt the rendition's emotive quality was the result of the supposed human element; it moved him to tears, he said, and others he knew – such as Lou Reed and Laurie Anderson – had similar reactions. Critics echoed Eno's praise, including that of the rendition's superiority.

In 2010, the Black Dog, by means of their ninth studio album, Music for Real Airports, issued a "musical rebuttal" to Music for Airports, chastising the perceived dehumanisation of airports and Eno's supposed intention of "lull[ing] customers". In 2023 and 2024, Bruce Brubaker released "Eno Piano" and "Eno Piano 2" – including a piano transcription of "Music for Airports" made with the assistance of Simon Hanes.

== Track listing ==
Side one
No.	Title	Writer(s)	Length
1.	"1/1" (Acoustic and electric piano; synthesizer.)	Brian Eno, Rhett Davies, Robert Wyatt	16:30
2.	"2/1" (Vocals; synthesizer.)	Eno	8:20
Total length:			24:50

Side two
No.	Title	Writer(s)	Length
3.	"1/2" (Vocals; acoustic piano.)	Eno	11:30
4.	"2/2" (Synthesiser only. Lasts 9:38 in the "Working Backwards" box edition (1983) and on the CD.)	Eno	6:00
Total length:			17:30

The track labelling refers to the album's first release (1978) as an LP, and so the first track means "first track, first side", and so on. The CD pressing adds 30 seconds of silence after every track, including "2/2".

The album's back cover features four abstract graphic notation images, one for each track, representing their structure and instrumentation.

== Personnel ==
- Brian Eno – synthesiser, electric piano, vocals
- Christa Fast – vocals ("2/1", "1/2")
- Christine Gomez – vocals ("2/1", "1/2")
- Inge Zeininger – vocals ("2/1", "1/2")
- Robert Wyatt – acoustic piano ("1/1", "1/2")

Recording

- Brian Eno – producer, engineer
- Dave Hutchins – engineer ("2/1", "1/2")
- Conny Plank – engineer ("2/2"),
- Rhett Davies – engineer ("1/1")

Design

- Brian Eno – cover art

Recording Location

- London ("1/1", "1/2", "2/1")
- Plank's Studio, Cologne ("2/2")

== Release history ==
Country	Label	Cat. No.	Media	Release date
US	Polydor	AMB 001	LP	1978
France	Polydor	2310 647	LP	1978
Canada	GRT	9167–9835	LP	1978
Italy	Polydor	2310 647	LP	1978
US	Editions EG	EGS 201	LP	1981
UK	Editions EG	EGED 17	LP	1983
UK	Editions EG, Virgin	EEGCD 17	CD	Aug 1990
US	Editions EG	EEGCD 17	CD	Aug 1990
UK	Virgin Records	ENOCD 6, 7243 8 66495 2 2	CD	2004

== Certifications ==
Region	Certification	Certified units/sales
United Kingdom (BPI)	Silver	60,000^{‡}
^{‡} Sales+streaming figures based on certification alone.

== See also ==
- Ambient 2: The Plateaux of Mirror
- Ambient 3: Day of Radiance
- Ambient 4: On Land
