= Speedy J =

Dutch electronic music producer

- Speedy J in 2026

Background information
- Also known as: Speedy J
- Born: Jochem George Paap; 14 February 1969 (age 57); Netherlands
- Genres: Techno, tech house, minimal techno
- Years active: Early 1990s–present
- Website: speedyj.com

Jochem George Paap (born 14 February 1969, in Rotterdam), known by his stage name Speedy J, is a Dutch electronic music producer based in Rotterdam. His breakthrough came with the release in 1992 of the minimal techno track "Pullover". He released music as part of Warp Records' Artificial Intelligence series in the 1990s, including his debut LP Ginger (1993).

== Career ==
His debut album Ginger (1993) was released on Richie Hawtin's Plus 8 record label in Canada, while in the UK it was part of Warp Records' Artificial Intelligence series of electronic listening music. G-Spot, also on Warp, followed in 1995. He then released a live album, !ive, on his own Beam Me Up! label. Moving to label NovaMute, his work, which included Public Energy No.1 (1997) and A Shocking Hobby (2000), became more experimental.

The album Loudboxer (2002) saw a return to a more minimal four to the floor style of techno. The CD version of the album contains 15 tracks mixed together, whereas the vinyl version instead contains 200 locked grooves.

He collaborated with Mike Paradinas on the project Slag Boom Van Loon, releasing an album and a remix album on Paradinas' label, Planet Mu. In 1999, he also released two ambient albums for the FAX +49-69/450464 label under his real name.

In 2008, his sound library/audio software, Kreate by Jochem Paap, was released by Fixed Noise.

Also in 2008, Speedy J started releasing music on his own record label, Electric Deluxe, also releasing records by Terence Fixmer, Gary Beck, Tommy Four Seven and others.

In 2013, Speedy J and Luca Mortellaro released a collaborative album under the name Zeitgeber. It was released on Mortellaro's label Stroboscopic Artefacts.

In March 2024, Speedy J announced an album with Surgeon under the name Multiples, titled Two Hours Or Something. The album was released on 17 May 2024.

== Critical reception ==
In his dance music course on MasterClass, Armin Van Buuren cited Speedy J's Ginger album as being one of his major early influences.

"Upon first impressions, Public Energy No.1 highlights a big departure from previous Speedy J offerings... in a complete role reversal, it enters upon an iconoclastic electro territory more familiar to admirers of such other purveyors as Autechre, the Aphex Twin, Mike Paradinas and Martin Damm in his Steel persona," wrote Andrez Bergen in 1998 for Australian magazine Inpress.

== Selected discography ==
=== Albums ===
- Ginger (Plus 8/Warp, 1993)
- G-Spot (Plus 8/Warp, 1995)
- !ive (Beam Me Up!, 1995) (live album)
- Public Energy No. 1 (Plus 8/NovaMute, 1997)
- Vrs-Mbnt-Pcs 9598 I (Fax +49-69/450464, 1999) (as Jochem Paap)
- Vrs-Mbnt-Pcs 9598 II (Fax +49-69/450464, 1999) (as Jochem Paap)
- A Shocking Hobby (NovaMute, 2000)
- Loudboxer (NovaMute, 2002)
- Walkman (Stoor, 2026)

=== Collaborations ===
- Slag Boom Van Loon – Slag Boom Van Loon (Planet Mu, 1998) (with Mike Paradinas)
- Slag Boom Van Loon – So Soon (Planet Mu, 2001) (other artists' remixes of the Slag Boom Van Loon album)
- Pete Namlook & Jochem Paap – pp.nmlk (Fax +49-69/450464, 2004)
- Jochem Paap + Scott Pagano – Umfeld (Umfeld.tv, 2007) (released as a DVD, audio by Jochem Paap, video by Scott Pagano)
- Zeitgeber – Zeitgeber (Stroboscopic Artefacts, 2013) (Speedy J and Luca Mortellaro)
- Multiples - Two Hours of Something (2024) (Speedy J and Surgeon)

=== Collabs ===
Collabs is the name of a series of 12" vinyl EPs wherein Speedy J collaborates with a selection of techno artists. Following Collabs 300 Speedy J and Chris Liebing embarked on a Collabs tour, on which they performed a mix of live samples and turntable mixing. An album, Collabs 3000: Metalism, was released on 10 November 2005 on NovaMute.

- Collabs 100 (with Adam Beyer)
- Collabs 200 (with Literon)
- Collabs 300 (with Chris Liebing)
- Collabs 301 (with Chris Liebing)
- Collabs 400 (with George Issakidis)
- Collabs 401 (with George Issakidis)
- Collabs 3000: Metalism (with Chris Liebing)
- Collabs: Magnit EP (with Chris Liebing)
- Collabs: Magnit EP 2 (with Chris Liebing)
