= The Black Dog (band) =

British electronic music group

- Also known as: Echo Mike, Close Up Over, Xeper, Atypic, I.A.O., Balil, the Discordian Popes
- Origin: Sheffield, England
- Genres: Electronic; IDM; ambient; techno; experimental; field recordings
- Years active: 1989–1995, 2005–present
- Labels: Soma, Dust Science, Warp, GPR, Black Dog Productions, BMG, Sire
- Spinoffs: Plaid
- Members: Martin Dust; Richard Dust
- Past members: Ken Downie; Andy Turner; Ed Handley; Steve Ash; Ross Knight

The Black Dog is a British electronic music group, founded in 1989 by Ken Downie along with Ed Handley and Andy Turner. The group are considered pioneering figures of techno's ruminative "home-listening" aesthetic in the early 1990s.

Following several self-released EPs, the group signed to Warp Records in 1993 and released albums such as Bytes (1993) and Spanners (1995). In 1995, Handley and Turner departed to work on their spin-off project Plaid. Downie continued recording under the band name The Black Dog until his death in 2025, with Richard and Martin Dust joining. The band's early EPs were collected on the 2007 compilation Book of Dogma.

== Biography ==
The Black Dog was founded in 1989 and led by Ken Downie, whose influences ranged from musician Debbie Harry to writer Jules Verne. Unable to find a label to back their releases, the band started their own, Black Dog Productions, which released four vinyl records including the acclaimed Virtual. These were followed by a number of EPs on the General Production Recordings label. The Black Dog released their first album Bytes on Warp Records on 15 March 1993. The albums Temple of Transparent Balls (GPR) and Spanners (Warp) followed. The music was often produced under a number of different names, such as Close Up Over, Xeper, Atypic, I.A.O., Balil and the Discordian Popes. The group did numerous remixes, notably for Björk, with whom it collaborated on "'Sweet Intuition" (a B-side on the "Army of Me" CD single) and "Charlene" (a b side on the "Isobel" CD single).

In the early 1990s, Downie was also running a bulletin board system called Black Dog Towers.

In 1995, Handley and Turner left to focus on Plaid but Downie continued working as The Black Dog on his own for a while, releasing the solo album Music for Adverts (and Short Films). With new management, and an increased vigour, Downie then teamed up with Steve 'Hotdog' Ash and Ross Knight ("thek1d"). Though they completed over a dozen critically acclaimed remixes during this period, only one album was ever released: Unsavoury Products featured the talents of Parisian beat poet Black Sifichi on vocals.

=== Later work ===
In 2001, Downie teamed up with Martin and Richard Dust, owners of the label Dust Science Recordings. Martin had been influenced by Cabaret Voltaire and the Human League, as well as Sheffield gigs by Orchestral Manoeuvres in the Dark (with support from Joy Division) and U.K. Subs. Richard drew from electronic dance music and Warp Records artists, and was also a Pet Shop Boys fan. This three-piece Black Dog line-up released eight EPs and four albums on Dust Science. Their first album, Silenced, was released in 2005. The second, Radio Scarecrow, was released in 2008 and was very well received and nominated for DJ Mag's Best of British 2008.

The follow-up to Radio Scarecrow, Further Vexations, was released in 2009. It was described as having a dark cynicism of Orwellian practices of government and the passivity of the general public. "We've helplessly watched with mounting horror, while the government trashed the country, signed away its sovereignty to Brussels (with a flourish of a specially minted silver pen), sold off precious national industries and assets at next to bargain basement prices, and indulged itself with two utterly pointless wars which it couldn't afford," the group stated on their home page.

In May 2010, the Black Dog teamed with creative agency "Human" to create Music for Real Airports, described by them as "a contemporary reply to Brian Eno's work from the 70s". While Eno's album is well known for being peaceful and sedate, The Black Dog intend theirs to be tense and bittersweet, saying "This record is not necessarily a comfortable listen. But it captures the spectrum of emotions stirred by airports."

Downie died on 20 December 2025.

== Side projects ==
The initial line-up kept themselves busy with numerous alter-egos and side-projects, including Echo Mike, Close Up Over, Xeper, Atypic, I.A.O., Plaid, Balil and the Discordian Popes. 1993's Bytes compiles an album's worth of tracks by these side projects under the mantle of Black Dog Productions. Of these side-projects, only Plaid continues to be active.

More recently, the current line-up of The Black Dog (Ken Downie with Martin and Richard Dust) have collaborated with Psychick Warriors ov Gaia on a new ambient project called Dadavistic Orchestra. Taking inspiration from the Dada artists of the early 1900s, Dadavistic Orchestra have issued an album and two EPs, offering limited edition gelatin silver prints in homage to avant-garde photographer Man Ray with early copies sold via mail order.

== Discography ==
=== Albums ===
Ken Downie with Ed Handley and Andy Turner:
- 1993 Bytes (as Black Dog Productions)
- 1993 Temple of Transparent Balls
- 1995 Spanners

Ken Downie solo:

- 1996 Music for Adverts (and Short Films)

Ken Downie with Steve Ash and Ross Knight:

- 2002 Unsavoury Products (featuring Black Sifichi)

Ken Downie with Martin Dust and Richard Dust:

- 2005 Silenced
- 2008 Radio Scarecrow
- 2009 Further Vexations
- 2010 Music for Real Airports
- 2011 Liber Dogma
- 2013 Tranklements
- 2015 Neither/Neither
- 2018 Black Daisy Wheel
- 2018 Post-Truth
- 2020 Fragments
- 2021 Music for Photographers
- 2023 Music for Airport Lounges
- 2023 The Grey Album
- 2023 My Brutal Life
- 2023 Music for Moore Street Substation
- 2024 Other, Like Me
- 2024 Sleep Deprivation
- 2025 My Brutal Life 2
- 2025 Loud Ambient

Martin Dust and Richard Dust:

- 2026 Loud Ambient 2
- 2026 Feral Grace
- 2026 Psychick Youth
- 2026 In The North

=== EPs ===
Ken Downie with Ed Handley and Andy Turner:
- 1989 Virtual
- 1989 Age of Slack
- 1990 Techno Playtime
- 1991 Parallel
- 1992 Vir²l
- 1992 Vanttool
- 1999 Peel Session (recorded 1995)

Ken Downie solo:

- 1998 Babylon (with Ofra Haza)
- 1998 Plan Black V Dog (with Gustavo Cerati's Plan V)

Ken Downie with Martin Dust and Richard Dust:

- 2005 Bite Thee Back
- 2005 Trojan Horus
- 2005 Remote Viewing
- 2005 The Remixes
- 2006 Riphead
- 2007 Floods
- 2008 Set to Receive
- 2008 Detroit vs. Sheffield
- 2009 Vexing
- 2009 We Are Sheffield
- 2009 The Vexing Remixes
- 2010 Thee Lounge
- 2010 Subject to Delays
- 2011 Liber Kult (Book 1 ov 3)
- 2011 Liber Temple (Book 2 ov 3)
- 2011 Liber Nox (Book 3 ov 3)
- 2011 Liber Chaos (Book ov Aiwass)
- 2013 The Return ov Bleep
- 2013 Darkhaus Vol. 01
- 2013 Darkhaus Vol. 02
- 2013 The Return Ov Bleep
- 2014 Werk+Play
- 2014 Exhibit 1 & 2
- 2018 Shards Ov Light
- 2020 Allegory 1 (Red)
- 2020 Allegory 2 (Green)
- 2020 Allegory 3 (Blue)
- 2020 Further Fragments
- 2021 Dubs: Volume 1
- 2021 Dubs: Volume 2
- 2021 Dubs: Volume 3
- 2022 Brutal Minimalism
- 2022 Concrete Reasoning
- 2022 Fighting Modernism
- 2023 The Reproduce
- 2023 Being Brutal
- 2024 Nybrutalism
- 2024 Isolation
- 2024 Seclusion
- 2024 Dreamless Sleep

=== Compilations and live albums ===
Ken Downie with Ed Handley and Andy Turner:
- 1995 Parallel
- 2007 Book of Dogma
- 2021 Fragments Live

Ken Downie with Steve Ash and Ross Knight:

- 2003 Genetically Modified (with Black Sifichi, remixes from Unsavoury Products)
Ken Downie with Martin Dust and Richard Dust:
- 2006 Thee Singles
- 2008 Thee Singles Volume 2
- 2010 Final Collected Vexations
- 2014 Liber Collected – Book Ov Law
- 2018 Department Of Dogma (Live In Toronto 1997)
- 2020 Fragments Live (Sheffield 2020)
- 2022 Live In Barcelona 25/03/22
- 2024 The Black Dog Live @ Festival Of The Mind
- 2024 Live At The ICA
