= Soma Records (UK label) =

Scottish independent record label

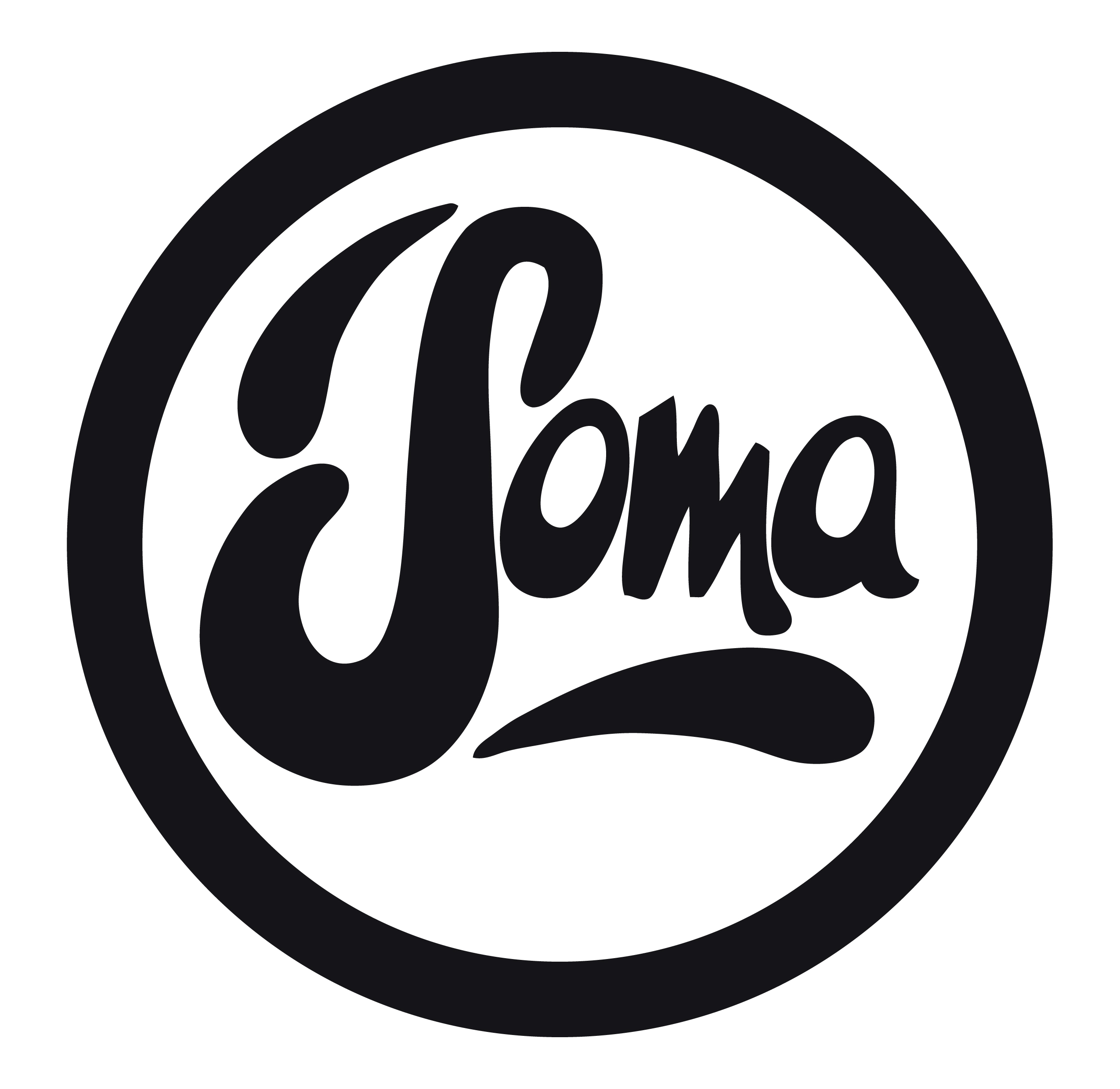
- Official logo of Soma Quality Records
- Parent company: Soma Recordings Ltd.
- Founded: 1991
- Founder: Glenn Gibbons; Jim Muotune; Dave Clarke; Stuart McMillan; Orde Meikle
- Status: Active
- Distributor: PIAS Distribution
- Genre: Ambient; IDM; house; techno; tech house; electro
- Country of origin: Scotland
- Location: Glasgow, Scotland
- Official website: www.somarecords.com

Soma Records is an independent record label based in Glasgow, Scotland. It was co-founded in 1991 by the electronic music duo Slam, Dave Clarke (not the English techno musician), and Glenn Gibbons. The label is known for releasing early works from Slam, Jeff Mills, and Funk D'Void, as well as tracks such as Silicone Soul's "Right On Right On", Felix da Housecat's "Clashback", and the original vinyl version of Daft Punk's "Da Funk".

== History ==
The origin of the label goes back to 1991 when there was very much a DIY ethos back at the tail end of the 1980s. In that time, electronic music became more dominant in the music industry, with a greater reliance on synthesizers and the adoption of programmable drum machines and the advent of affordable music technology. A lot of enthusiastic group founders of people such as Soma founders that were passionated about music created a lot of well-known labels that are still existing nowadays. So there was the DJ and music producer duo called Slam, consisting of Orde Meikle and Stuart McMillan who met in 1986 in Sheffield, where former was studying geography at university and later was working in a bar. They did try to get some help from the rock infrastructure that existed in Scotland and sell the idea to a couple of people involved in the music industry, but they failed. So they decided to go to a small studio to make their first couple of tracks with Rejuvenation—duo from UK, consisting of Jim Muotune and Glenn Gibbons and press 1,000 records of the techno EP entitled "Eterna / I.B.O.". Jim and Glenn were the sound engineers for the release. They phoned record shops to ask if they would like to buy 10 or 15 copies, with the profit used to fund pressing of another 1,000 copies.

We never had any plans. Back then we didn't think it would have seen its 20th year, but I don't see why it shouldn't. We never had a grand plan and that's probably the reason why it lasted so long.

— Orde Meikle, one half of label founding fathers

Soma is most known for releasing the original vinyl version of Daft Punk's track "Da Funk" in 1995. It contains an uncredited beat sample of "Bounce Rock Skate Roll" performed by Vaughan Mason & Crew and drum break sample of "I'm Gonna Love You Just a Little More Babe" performed by Barry White. This is what label's manager says about them in his interview to Fabric:

...I remember meeting Daft Punk in Paris for the first time, two teenagers. They played us their tracks in their studio, which was in Thomas' mum and dad's apartment in Montmarte. We had been introduced by Tom and Jerry Bouthier—Thomas and Guy-Manuel were fans of "Positive Education", which had just been released. They liked the idea of releasing on a label outside France, so Soma fitted the bill. We heard the first set of four tracks that became the 'New Wave' single. We thought they were amazing, we all left with big smiles on our faces, we knew this was special, but how special I don't think any of us could have imagined!

— Dave Clarke, manager of label

The label celebrated its 20th anniversary in 2011 and released the Soma Records – 20 Years compilation on 19 September 2011. The compilation contains a Daft Punk demo recording of a track called "Drive" that remained in the label's archives. On 31 March 2017 they turned 25 years old and to celebrate their anniversary, Soma enlisted Jeff Mills, Robert Hood, Adam Beyer and many others to contribute to a special box set Soma25, which includes their long-lost remix of Daft Punk's "Drive". The label took part in a Boiler Room session in Glasgow showcasing its artists and local favourites. Soma Quality Records continues to be one of the UK's leading techno labels.

== List of artists ==
This is a list of artists that are currently, or once were signed to Soma Quality Records:

0–9

- 04LM

A

- Adam Beyer & Jesper Dahlback
- Alex Smoke
- Arnaud Le Texier
- Audio Spectrum

B

- B12
- Beroshima
- Bryan Zentz
- Buried Secrets
- Butch Cassidy Sound System

C

- Calculus
- Charles Fenckler
- Christian Wunsch
- Cleric
- Clouds
- Counterplan
- Cratesavers

D

- Daft Punk
- Dan Curtin
- Daniel Ibbotson
- Dax J
- Deepbass
- Deepchord
- Desert Storm
- Dove

E

- Eastmen
- EBE
- Edit Select
- Ege Bam Yasi
- Electric Rescue
- Envoy
- Equus
- Ewan Pearson

F

- Faculty X
- Felicie
- Frame
- Freelance Science Artist
- Freska
- Funk D'Void
- Funk D'Void & Sian

G

- G7
- Gary Beck
- Gemini Voice Archive
- Giordano

H

- H-Foundation
- Harvey McKay
- Heron
- Heron & Dantiez Saunderson
- Hipp-E & Tony
- Holmes & McMillan
- Hutton Drive
- Hystereo

I

- Ilario Alicante
- Indo Silver Club
- Itamar Sagi

J

- Jandroide
- Jaun Iborra
- Jef Dam
- Jeff Derringer
- Jet Project
- Joe Stawarz
- John Barber
- John Tejada

K

- Kontal
- Kyle Geiger

L

- Lars Huismann
- Lee Van Dowski & Tsack
- Let's Go Outside
- Lewis Fautzi
- Lex Horton
- Liebezeit
- LightSleepers
- Luciano

M

- Maas
- Magna Pia
- Manta Electrica
- Marco Bernardi
- Mark Henning
- Martinez
- Massi DL & Xpansul
- Monoloc
- My Robot Friend

N

- New Soul Fusion
- Norbak

O

- Octogen
- Oliver Deutschmann

P

- Percy X
- Petrichor
- Pig&Dan
- Pressure Funk

Q

- Quail + AISHA

R

- Rebekah
- Reeko
- Roberto Clementi
- ROD
- Roll Dann

S

- Schatrax
- Sci.Fi Hi.Fi
- Sci.Fi Lo.Fi
- Scott Grooves
- Secluded
- Setaoc Mass
- Sharkimaxx
- SHDW & Obscure Shape
- Sidetrax
- Sidewinder
- Silicone Soul
- Skintrade
- Slam
- Slam, Gary Beck
- SLV
- STS
- Symmetrical Behaviour
- Sündikat

T

- Temudo
- Tensal
- The Black Dog
- The Spirals
- The Surgeon
- The Unknown Wanderer
- Tony Thomas

U

- Uun

V

- Vector Lovers

W

- Wolf 'n' Flow
- Woo York

X

- X-Funk

Y

- Yan Cook
