= Intelligent dance music =

Loose label for experimental electronic music

- Other names: Electronic listening music; Intelligent techno; Art techno; Braindance
- Stylistic origins: Ambient techno; techno; ambient; acid house; breakbeat; electro
- Cultural origins: Early 1990s, United Kingdom

Intelligent dance music (IDM) is a loose label used to describe experimental forms of electronic music associated with early-1990s ambient techno, "electronic listening music" and related forms of electronica. Rather than being defined by a fixed set of genre conventions, IDM has generally been associated with individualistic experimentation. Music described with the term often drew on electronic dance music styles such as acid house, ambient techno, Detroit techno and breakbeat. Music described as IDM was often promoted or regarded as suited to home listening, although artists associated with the label also produced dancefloor-oriented tracks. Prominent artists associated with the label include Aphex Twin, Autechre, Boards of Canada, Squarepusher, μ-Ziq, the Black Dog, the Future Sound of London, and Orbital.

The phrase "intelligent dance music" has been associated with the 1992 Warp compilation Artificial Intelligence. The acronym "IDM" came into wider online use in 1993 with the formation of the "IDM list", an electronic mailing list chartered for discussion of English artists appearing on the compilation. The term has been widely criticised and dismissed by artists associated with it, particularly for the implication that other dance music is less "intelligent". Rephlex Records, co-founded by Aphex Twin, promoted "braindance" as an alternative term. In 2014, music critic Sasha Frere-Jones observed that the term IDM "is widely reviled but still commonly used".

== Musical characteristics ==
Mark J. Butler characterises IDM less as a genre defined by particular musical traits than as a label associated with individualistic experimentation. Musicologist Anthony Papavassiliou describes IDM as combining familiar structures of popular music—predominantly binary rhythms, repetition and conventional forms—with rhythmic and timbral complexity.

Simon Reynolds distinguishes an early phase whose beats were modelled on house and techno from a later, jungle-influenced phase marked by more forceful and inventive drum programming. In analyses of works by Aphex Twin and Autechre, Papavassiliou identifies two kinds of "microrhythmic set"—groups of very rapid events: textural sets that contrast with the surrounding rhythmic material, and gestural sets that suggest rhythmic continuation.

Ben Ramsay links IDM's development to the increased availability of personal computers and affordable samplers, which enabled musicians to manipulate, process and sequence recorded sound as compositional material. Among the examples he discusses are works combining field recordings and sampled broadcasts with synthetic sounds, as well as Autechre's use of reverberation and echo to shape perceived space.

Papavassiliou also identifies sonic micromanipulation techniques including granular synthesis, slicing, automated repetition and mixing, time-stretching and sound "freezing". Reynolds characterises the early phase of IDM as emphasising melody, atmosphere and emotion. Ramsay describes timbral and structural exploration while noting that IDM may retain familiar pitched and metric materials such as beats, melodic phrases and recognisable machine timbres.

Although some early releases were promoted for post-club or home listening, the distinction from dancefloor music was not absolute. AllMusic describes IDM as encompassing music suited to both the dancefloor and the living room, while Andrew Blake noted that artists associated with the term could produce both ambient material and "brutal dancefloor tracks".

== History ==
=== Antecedents ===
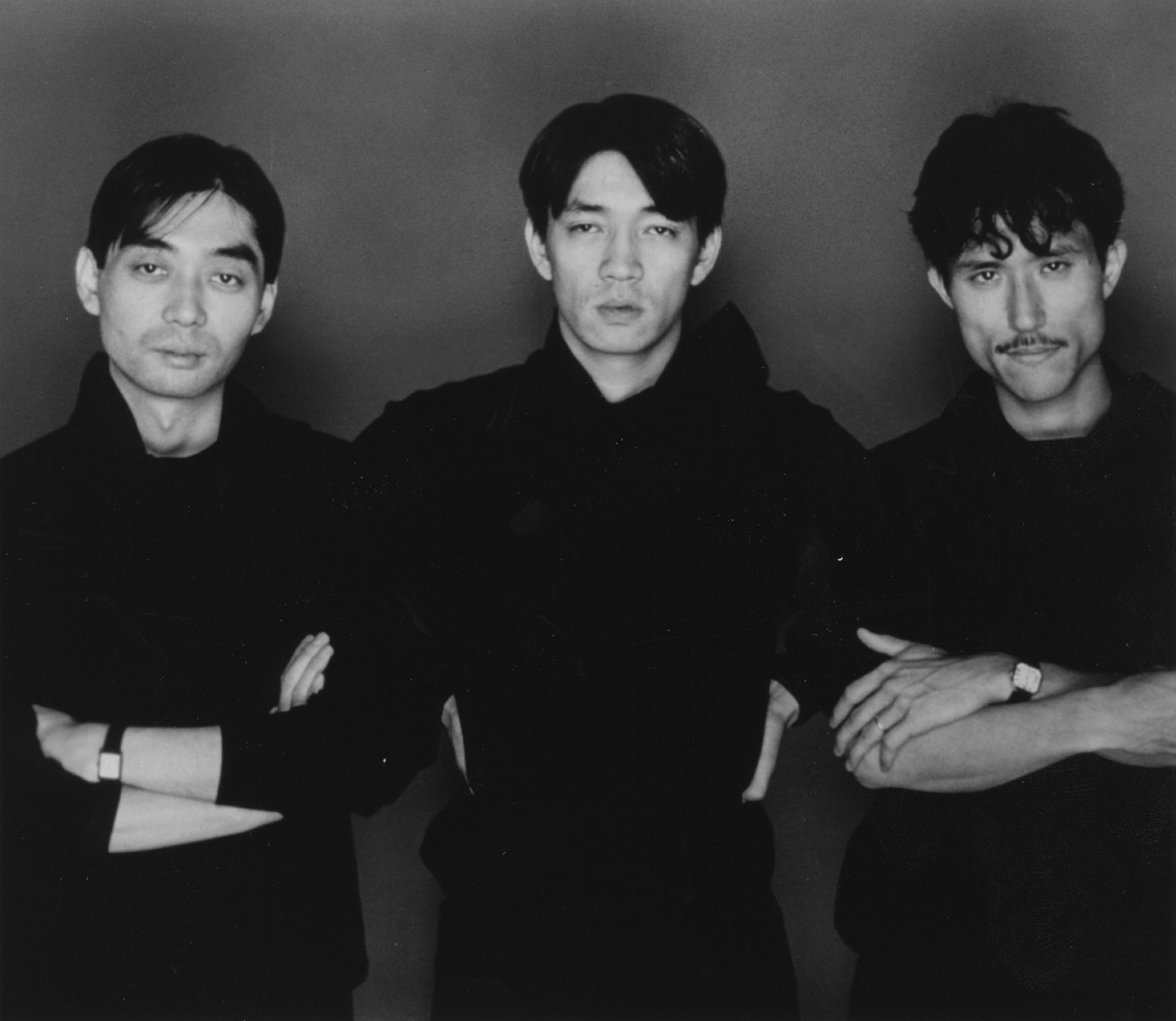
Yellow Magic Orchestra in 1981. The band's album BGM and Ryuichi Sakamoto's solo album B-2 Unit have been described as anticipating aspects of later IDM.

Some writers have retrospectively identified early-1980s work by the Japanese band Yellow Magic Orchestra (YMO) and its member Ryuichi Sakamoto as antecedents to later IDM. Sakamoto's 1980 solo album B-2 Unit has been described as anticipating aspects of the sounds later associated with IDM. NME described the album as emphasizing "atmosphere and tone" over traditional song structures and as anticipating 1990s IDM a decade earlier. According to Vice, the B-2 Unit track "E-3A" offered "a hint of the decade to come" with "IDM-leaning cut-up complexities."

YMO's 1981 album BGM has also been discussed in relation to later IDM. According to Analog Planet, the BGM track "Ballet" has an IDM-like electronic soundscape that combines "electronic drums, persistent hi-hats, and sustained synths" with a "melancholic emptiness."

=== Early 1990s: ambient techno and home listening ===
In the late 1980s, ensuing from acid house and early rave party scenes, UK-based groups such as the Orb and the KLF produced ambient house, a genre that fused the pulses of house music, particularly acid house, with ambient music and sample-based soundscapes. By the early 1990s, the increasingly distinct music associated with dance music-oriented experimentation had gained prominence with releases on a variety of mostly UK-based record labels, including Warp (1989), Black Dog Productions (1989), R&S Records (1989), Carl Craig's Planet E, Rising High Records (1991), Richard James's Rephlex Records (1991), Kirk Degiorgio's Applied Rhythmic Technology (1991), Eevo Lute Muzique (1991), General Production Recordings (1989), Soma Quality Recordings (1991), Peacefrog Records (1991), and Metamorphic Recordings (1992).

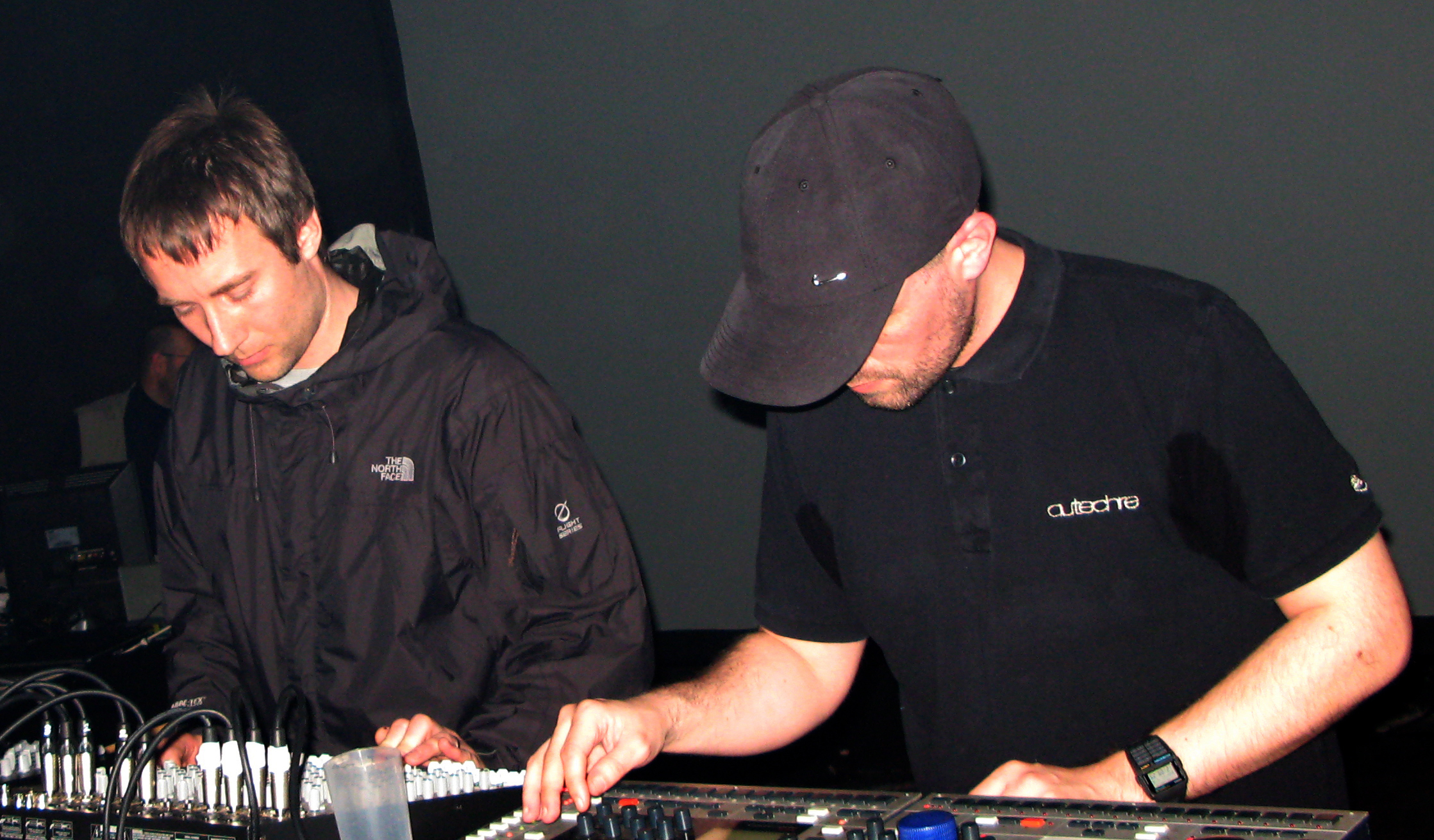
Autechre, one of the artists featured on Warp's 1992 compilation Artificial Intelligence.

In 1992, Warp released Artificial Intelligence, the first album in the Artificial Intelligence series. Subtitled "electronic listening music from Warp", the record was a collection of tracks from artists such as Autechre, B12, Black Dog Productions, Aphex Twin and the Orb, under various aliases. This would help establish the ambient techno sound of the early 1990s. Steve Beckett, co-owner of Warp, has said the electronic music that the label was releasing then was targeting a post-club, home-listening audience. Following the success of the Artificial Intelligence series, "intelligent techno" became the favoured term, although ambient—without a qualifying house or techno suffix, but still referring to a hybrid form—was a common synonym.

In the same period (1992–93), other names were also used, such as "art techno", "armchair techno", and "electronica", but all were attempts to describe an emerging offshoot of electronic dance music that was being enjoyed by the "sedentary and stay at home". At the same time, the UK market was saturated with increasingly frenetic breakbeat and sample-laden hardcore techno records that quickly became formulaic. Rave had become a "dirty word", so as an alternative, it was common for London nightclubs to advertise that they were playing "intelligent" or "pure" techno, appealing to a "discerning" crowd that considered the hardcore sound to be too commercial.

=== Term and mailing list ===
In November 1991, the phrase "intelligent techno" appeared on Usenet in reference to English experimental group Coil's The Snow EP. Off the Internet, the same phrase appeared in both the U.S. and UK music press in late 1992, in reference to Jam & Spoon's Tales from a Danceographic Ocean and the music of the Future Sound of London. Another instance of the phrase appeared on Usenet in April 1993 in reference to the Black Dog's album Bytes. And in July 1993, in his review of an ethno-dance compilation for NME, Ben Willmott replaced techno with dance music, writing "...current 'intelligent' dance music owes much more to Eastern mantra-like repetition and neo-ambient instrumentation than the disco era which preceded the advent of acid and techno."

Wider public use of such terms on the Internet came in August 1993, when Alan Parry announced the existence of a new electronic mailing list for discussion of "intelligent" dance music: the "Intelligent Dance Music list", or "IDM List" for short. The first message, sent on 1 August 1993, was entitled "Can Dumb People Enjoy IDM, Too?". A reply from the list server's system administrator and founder of Hyperreal.org Brian Behlendorf, revealed that Parry originally wanted to create a list devoted to discussion of the music on the Rephlex label, but they decided together to expand its charter to include music similar to what was on Rephlex or that was in different genres but which had been made with similar approaches. They picked the word "intelligent" because it had already appeared on Artificial Intelligence and because it connoted being something beyond just music for dancing, while still being open to interpretation.

Warp's second Artificial Intelligence compilation was released in 1994. The album featured fragments of posts from the IDM mailing list incorporated into typographic artwork by the Designers Republic. Sleeve notes by David Toop acknowledged the genre's multitude of musical and cultural influences and suggested none should be considered more important than any other.

=== Mid-to-late 1990s: diversification and international expansion ===
Simon Reynolds identifies a second phase of IDM in which labels including Skam, Schematic, Mille Plateaux, Morr and Planet Mu expanded the market established by Warp's early releases. He associates this phase with artists including μ-Ziq and Squarepusher and with a shift, partly in response to jungle, towards more forceful and inventive drum programming.

During the 1990s, music associated with IDM gained an audience in the United States. Miami became an important centre for IDM-related music through Schematic and related artists, while several other American labels devoted to IDM emerged by the end of the decade.

== Legacy and influence ==
Music associated with IDM influenced artists outside electronic dance music. Radiohead's 2000 album Kid A drew on what AllMusic called the "intelligent techno" sound of Autechre and Aphex Twin. In 2017, music critic Simon Reynolds connected an early-2000s phase of IDM with the emergence of styles such as breakcore and glitchcore, and argued that the music's influence continued after its 1990s peak.

In 2007, Igloo Magazine identified a "third wave" of IDM artists beginning around 2004 and described the music as less influential and popular than during its earlier phases. In 2014, music critic Sasha Frere-Jones noted that the term remained commonly used despite being widely disliked. A 2022 retrospective in The Guardian described the influence of Warp's Artificial Intelligence as continuing across later scenes and generations.

== Criticism of the term ==
The term has been criticised for implying that other forms of dance music are less "intelligent". AllMusic describes IDM as "a loaded term" that drew negative attention because it appeared to distinguish its artists and listeners from producers and fans of supposedly "Stupid" dance music. Several musicians associated with the label have also rejected or distanced themselves from it. In a 1997 interview, Aphex Twin objected that the phrase was "really nasty to everyone else's music", while Mike Paradinas has said that the term was used chiefly in North America rather than in the United Kingdom.

Rephlex Records, co-founded by Aphex Twin, promoted "braindance" as an alternative overarching genre name; Dave Segal of Stylus Magazine described this as possibly a "snide dig" at IDM's name. Other musicians have similarly treated IDM as a loose or unwanted label. Kid606 called it "a label invented by PR companies", while Matmos said the term was acceptable only in the limited sense of music that "might be talked about on the IDM list", but called "intelligent dance music" laughable.

In a 2016 interview with Resident Advisor, Autechre's Sean Booth called the term "silly" and said that Warp's Artificial Intelligence tag functioned for him as a "sci-fi music" signifier rather than a claim of superior intelligence. Responding to such criticism, Mike Brown of Hyperreal.org said in 2018 that IDM was "just three letters" used within a small online community for music on the fringes of electronic dance music, and that no one intended "to coin a genre name or to imply the artists and fans were geniuses".

== See also ==
- List of electronic music genres
- List of IDM artists
