= Close Combined =

Album by Richie Hawtin

Close Combined (Glasgow, London, Tokyo – Live)

Compilation album by Richie Hawtin
- Released: September 20, 2019
- Genre: Minimal techno, Acid techno, Electronic
- Length: 67:52
- Label: Plus 8 Records
- Producer: Richie Hawtin

Richie Hawtin chronology
Concept 1 (2021)	Close Combined (Glasgow, London, Tokyo – Live) (2019)

Close Combined (Glasgow, London, Tokyo – Live) (album is stylized in uppercase, and the overall tour/recording project as "CLOSE COMBINED") is a compilation album by the British-Canadian minimalist techno DJ Richie Hawtin. Released on 20 September 2019 on his Plus 8 records imprint, it consists of 16 heavily remixed tracks from three live performances during his 2019 CLOSE live tour. The set list includes tracks by Charlotte de Witte, Mental Resonance, Ricardo Garduno, Edit Select and Kaiserdisco.

The record and tour were met with universal critical acclaim, and the audio release is considered among his finest work, and comparable to his classic mixes Decks, EFX & 909 (live, 1999) and DE9: Closer to the Edit (studio, 2001).

Hawtin's two-hour (un-edited) live performance "FOLD—London UK" contains different mixes of several tracks and was released on video in October 2019.

== Format and sound ==
The album merges three of Hawtin's live performances from his 2019 CLOSE tour, during which he played at the Sónar, Primavera Sound festivals, the Paris L’Olympia, The Roundhouse, London, and the Sydney Opera House. The accompanying video footage was shot using three still (i.e. fixed position) cameras shown in a triptych format, and individually focus on his stage presence, equipment (including an analog mixer, PowerBook and two Roland TB-303 clones) and mixing technique. According to Hawtin, the close camera footage was "designed to bring greater transparency to the underlying art of DJing in the 'press-play' era". Hawtin has said that his "press-play" comment is in reaction to Deadmau5's 2012 remark that all DJs do anymore is turn up and "press play".

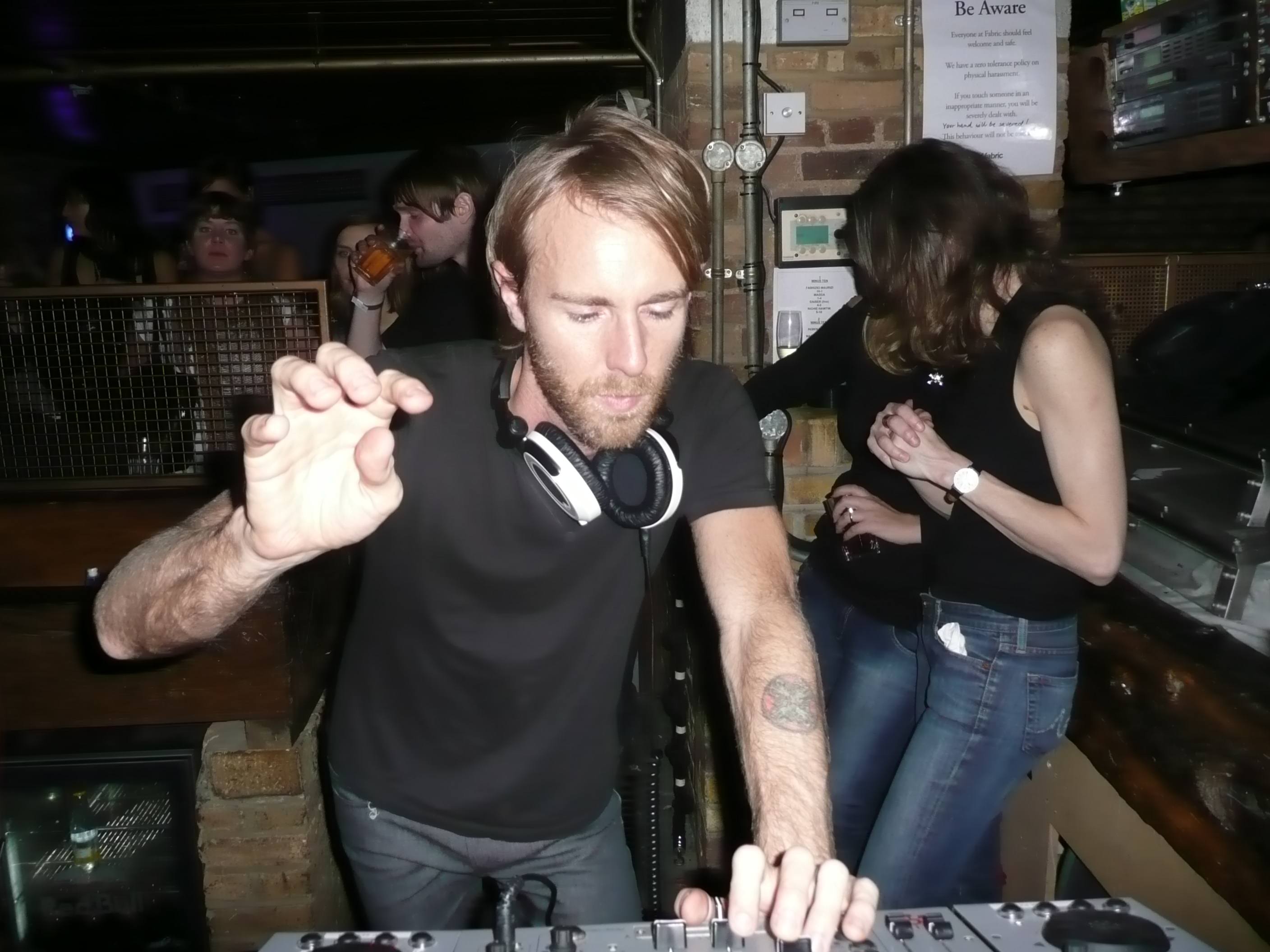
Hawtin performing live in 2008

The album lasts just over an hour at 57 minutes and comprises 16 main tracks by other artists that Hawtin heavily reworks. The tunes are a mix of intense bass drum and hi-hat sounds, overlaying classic techno intersected with 808 bleeps. There are two climatic points; at 30 and 60 minutes respectively, both of which are followed by a low pitched recording of his voice c. 1999 explaining his view of the creative role of DJs.

The audio/visual format was designed in partnership with his long term visual editor, Ali M. Demirel, and was promoted as an "up-close and deconstruct[ed]" insight into Hawtin's technique. Hawtin has said that with CLOSE/COMBINED he wanted "to be as transparent as possible in how, why and what I play in order to bring focus onto the intuitive spontaneity that is at the heart of a great DJ performance". The visual album was released free on YouTube and Facebook.

== Reception ==
Both the tour and recording are considered his most significant since the release of his seminal compilation albums Decks, EFX & 909 (1999) and DE9: Closer to the Edit (2001). According to Billboard, the album gives "a literal break from the classic DJ table model and a reassertion of the adventurous techno lineage Hawtin first discovered in late '80s Detroit."

The album was praised by Resident Advisor, and while the writer was unimpressed by the live footage ("it's... boring to watch...like a megascreen trained on a guitar god's fingers on the fretboard."), they praised the tune selection and mixing as "highlight[ing] a deep knowledge not only of the gear he's using, but of what makes a good DJ set"

== Set list ==
The album has 15 tracks, with an extra three (closing) tracks available on the video version. The following are as listed on Hawtin's bandcamp page and YouTube channel. As the tracks are heavily remixed, Hawtin is credited as a writer on each.

1. Rosper – "Artificial Technology" – 3:06
2. Eme Kulhnek, DJ Emerson – "Rolling Explicitly" 7:30
3. Kaiserdisco – "Acid Trip" – 04:33
4. Cortechs, Mental Resonance – "Core Resonance" – 7:15
5. Mental Resonance, Edit Select – "Antennae Select" – 2:46
6. Rocky Miller, Richie Hawtin – "Disengaged Acid" – 4:26
7. Cam Deas, Richie Hawtin – "Spontaneous Exercise" – 1:25
8. Charlotte de Witte, Lewis Fautzi, S.Sic – "These Restless Drums" – 5:26
9. Kuvoka – "Kargi Kontinued" – 04:27
10. Ricardo Garduno – "Heartwarming Acid" – 03:24
11. Dario Sorano – "Hybrid Acid" – 2:13
12. Balthazar & JackRock, Dario Sorano – "Hybrid Empire" – 4:27
13. Jen Series, ANNA – "When I'm a Freakin Acid Dream" – 5:43
14. Christian Hornbostel, AlBird – "Sensor Acid Overload" – 07:00
15. Richie Hawtin – "CLOSE combined (Moving Forward)" – 0:59

Extra video tracks:

1. The Sprawl - "From Wetware to Software"
2. Richie Hawtin - "First Times"
