= Artifakts (bc) =

Artifakts [bc]

Studio album by Plastikman
- Released: November 2, 1998
- Studios: The Building (Ontario, Canada)
- Genres: Acid techno; ambient techno
- Length: 73:18
- Labels: Minus; Novamute
- Producer: Richie Hawtin

Plastikman chronology
Consumed (1998)	Artifakts [bc] (1998)	Closer (2003)

Professional ratings
Review scores
Source	Rating
AllMusic	4/5 stars
Muzik	4/5 stars
The Village Voice	B−

Artifakts [bc] is the fifth studio album by Canadian electronic music producer Richie Hawtin, and his fourth studio album under the alias Plastikman. It was released on November 2, 1998, by Minus and Novamute Records. The album was devised as a way to bridge the periods between the Plastikman albums Musik and Consumed. The tracks on Artifakts [bc] were originally produced by Hawtin for an unreleased album entitled Klinik that was intended to form a trilogy with his prior albums Sheet One and Musik. Hawtin ultimately scrapped Klinik and instead began work on Consumed. "bc" in the title is an acronym for "Before Consumed".

Artifakts [bc] peaked at number 31 on the UK Independent Albums Chart.

== Track listing ==
All tracks are written by Richie Hawtin.

No.	Title	Length
1.	"Korridor"	5:49
2.	"Psyk"	8:30
3.	"Pakard"	12:13
4.	"Hypokondriak"	10:34
5.	"Rekall"	10:46
6.	"Skizofrenik"	4:59
7.	"Are Friends Electrik? / Lodgikal Nonsense"	20:26

Vinyl edition
No.	Title	Length
1.	"Pakard"	12:13
2.	"Skizofrenik"	4:59
3.	"Psyk"	8:30
4.	"Are Friends Electrik?"	12:59
5.	"Rekall"	10:46
6.	"Lodgikal Nonsense"	2:20

== Personnel ==
Credits adapted from liner notes.

- Richie Hawtin – music, design, layout
- Seth – design, layout
- Slim – design, layout

== Charts ==
Chart (1998)	Peak position
UK Independent Albums (Official Charts)	31
