= Spastik =

1993 song by Plastikman

Single by Plastikman

from the album Recycled Plastik
- Released: October 4, 1993
- Genre: Minimal techno
- Length: 9:22
- Label: Plus 8; NovaMute
- Songwriter(s): Richard Michael Hawtin
- Producer(s): Plastikman

Plastikman singles chronology
"Spastik" (1993)	"Krakpot" / "Elektrostatik" (1993)

"Spastik" is an instrumental track by British-Canadian electronic musician and DJ Richie Hawtin, under his alias Plastikman. It was released on 4 october 1993 in Canada and is his most well-known production and considered a classic in techno. It is also the first single from his Recycled Plastik EP.

== Background ==
"Spastik" is based on a nine-minute whirlwind of Roland TR-808 percussion. Hawtin often made it a centerpiece of his live performances.

== Critical reception ==
Jason Birchmeier of AllMusic wrote that "Spastik" "is downright staggering, especially when Hawtin unleashes the monstrous bass drum kicks after several minutes of slow buildup."

== Impact and legacy ==
In 2013, it was voted by Mixmag readers as the seventh "Greatest Dance Record of All Time" in 2013. In 2015, LA Weekly ranked "Spastik" number 13 in their list of "The 20 Best Dance Music Tracks in History", praising it as "an austere yet pummeling track so timelessly hypnotic that Dubfire of Deep Dish had a hit with a remix of it just a few years ago." In 2022, Rolling Stone ranked it number 98 in their list of the "200 Greatest Dance Songs of All Time".

== Track listing ==
- 12-inch single / CD maxi single, Canada / UK (1993)
1. "Spastik" - 9:22
2. "Helicopter" - 6:36
3. "Gak" (Remix) - 6:51
- 12-inch single re-issue, Canada (2002)
1. "Spastik" - 9:19
2. "Slak" / "Kriket" (Live at Spastik 1994) - 7:22
3. "Gak" (Remix) - 6:25

== Charts ==
Chart (2001)	Peak position
Belgium Dance (Ultratop Wallonia)	3
