= DE9 =

DE9 may refer to:

- DE-9, a common type of electrical connector
- Decks, EFX & 909, a 1999 album by Canadian Detroit techno artist Richie Hawtin
- DE9: Closer to the Edit, a 2001 album by Canadian Detroit techno artist Richie Hawtin
- DE9: Transitions, a 2005 album by Canadian Detroit techno artist Richie Hawtin
- DE9: Fragments, a 2012 recorded performance by Canadian Detroit techno artist Richie Hawtin
- Delaware Route 9
- USS Carlson (DE-9)
