= Decks, EFX & 909 =

Compilation album by Richie Hawtin
- Released: November 2, 1999
- Studio: The Building
- Genre: Detroit techno
- Length: 61:28
- Labels: Novamute Records, Minus

Richie Hawtin chronology
Decks, EFX & 909 (1999)	DE9 | Closer to the Edit (2001)

Decks, EFX & 909 is a 1999 compilation album by Canadian electronic music artist Richie Hawtin. It was created utilizing three turntables, an effects box, and a Roland TR-909 drum machine. Subsequently, followed by DE9: Closer to the Edit (2001), DE9: Transitions (2005) and DE9: Fragments (2012), it is the first entry in his DE9 series.

== Critical reception ==
Professional ratings
Review scores
Source	Rating
AllMusic	5/5 stars
The A.V. Club	favorable
CMJ New Music Monthly	favorable
Cleveland Scene	favorable
Hot Press	favorable
Muzik	4/5 stars
NME	8/10
The Rolling Stone Album Guide	4/5 stars
Spin	7/10

John Bush of AllMusic gave the album 5 stars out of 5, saying, "The result of Hawtin's obvious labor of love is a mix album that manages to be simultaneously intense and moody, pummeling yet restrained." Joshua Klein of The A.V. Club said, "even though his Detroit-indebted mix stays pretty subdued, it never gets boring." Amanda Nowinski of Billboard called it "a pure testament to the artist's passionate and innovative DJ style."

== Track listing ==
No.	Title	Artist(s)	Length
1.	"Early Blow"	Ratio	2:02
2.	"Dumped"	G. Flame & Mr. G	1:03
3.	"User (02) - B2"	Richard Harvey	1:11
4.	"User (04) - A2"	Richard Harvey	1:04
5.	"User (02) - A2"	Richard Harvey	1:24
6.	"User (01) - B2"	Richard Harvey	1:16
7.	"001A - A2"	Richard Harvey	1:23
8.	"B2"	Grain 1	1:09
9.	"Road to Rio EP - B2"	Santos Rodriguez	0:36
10.	"B1"	Grain 2	1:37
11.	"Road to Rio EP - A2"	Santos Rodriguez	1:28
12.	"A1"	Grain 2	0:47
13.	"002A - B1"	Richard Harvey	4:20
14.	"Call of the Wild"	Jeff Mills	1:49
15.	"L8"	Jeff Mills	0:39
16.	"Scout"	Jeff Mills	0:27
17.	"L8"	Jeff Mills	0:13
18.	"Orange/Minus 1"	Richie Hawtin	2:11
19.	"Orange/Minus 2"	Richie Hawtin	1:16
20.	"Minus/Orange 2"	Richie Hawtin	0:55
21.	"Let Your Body Learn"	Nitzer Ebb	2:11
22.	"Minus/Orange 1"	Richie Hawtin	1:16
23.	"What the Hell Was That?"	Intermission	0:55
24.	"Killabite (002) - A1"	Killabite	0:09
25.	"The Loops - A1"	Ben Sims	2:11
26.	"Alarms"	Jeff Mills	2:56
27.	"Force & Form (Surgeon Remake 2)"	Surgeon	1:16
28.	"Zen"	Pacou	1:58
29.	"Five"	Heiko Laux	2:07
30.	"Dead Eye"	Baby Ford & Eon	1:37
31.	"Club Soda"	Savvas Ysatis	2:23
32.	"It's Process Not Substance"	Stewart S. Walker	1:20
33.	"5"	M	0:31
34.	"Neo"	Vladislav Delay	1:20
35.	"Aliens Don't Boogie"	Thor	2:37
36.	"Question (003) - B2"	Marco Carola	2:51
37.	"Kykeon"	Quadrant	2:59
38.	"Never Tell You (Version)"	Rhythm & Sound	2:41
