= Closer (Plastikman album) =

Studio album by Plastikman
- Released: October 21, 2003
- Studios: The Building (Ontario, Canada)
- Genre: Minimal techno
- Length: 75:11
- Labels: Minus; Novamute
- Producer: Richie Hawtin

Plastikman chronology
Artifakts [bc] (1998)	Closer (2003)	EX (2014)

Closer is the sixth studio album by Canadian electronic music producer Richie Hawtin, and his fifth studio album under the alias Plastikman. It was released on October 21, 2003 by Minus and Novamute Records. It peaked at number 41 on the UK Independent Albums Chart.

== Critical reception ==
Professional ratings
Aggregate scores
Source	Rating
Metacritic	73/100
Review scores
Source	Rating
AllMusic	3.5/5 stars
Rolling Stone	3/5 stars
Spin	C−
Stylus Magazine	B+

Resident Advisor ranked Closer at number 56 on its list of the top 100 albums of the 2000s.

== Track listing ==
All tracks are written by Richie Hawtin.

No.	Title	Length
1.	"Ask Yourself"	8:46
2.	"Mind Encode"	5:39
3.	"Lost"	4:35
4.	"Disconnect"	4:56
5.	"Slow Poke (Twilight Zone Mix)"	7:49
6.	"Headcase"	9:53
7.	"Ping Pong"	9:28
8.	"Mind in Rewind"	10:19
9.	"I No"	3:40
10.	"I Don't Know"	10:06

== Personnel ==
Credits adapted from liner notes.

- Richie Hawtin – music, production, artwork concept
- Rashad – mastering
- Constructure – design
- Vern Harvey – photography

== Charts ==
Chart (2003)	Peak position
UK Independent Albums (Official Charts)	41
