= Consumed (Plastikman album) =

Studio album by Plastikman
- Released: May 18, 1998
- Studios: The Building (Ontario, Canada)
- Genres: Minimal techno; ambient techno
- Length: 73:31
- Labels: Minus; Novamute
- Producer: Richie Hawtin

Plastikman chronology
Musik (1994)	Consumed (1998)	Artifakts [bc] (1998)

Consumed is the fourth studio album by Canadian electronic music producer Richie Hawtin, and his third studio album under the alias Plastikman. It was released in 1998 by Minus and Novamute Records, with the 11:40 minute title track widely considered both the album's peak and one of Hawtin's best works.

== Recording ==
Consumed was recorded in The Building, Hawtin's studio since 1995. Most tracks were recorded live to 2-track DAT in a single take and edited down to album length. Equipment used included a Roland TR-909 (mainly as sequencer), Doepfer MAQ16/3 sequencer, Kawai XD-5 drum synthesizer, Akai S3000 sampler, Roland TB-303, and Serge modular. According to Hawtin, “Consumed is an album of feedback. Everything was cross‑modulating everything else.”

== Critical reception ==
Professional ratings
Review scores
Source	Rating
AllMusic	4.5/5 stars
The Encyclopedia of Popular Music	3/5 stars
MusicHound Rock: The Essential Album Guide	4/5 stars
Muzik	10/10
Rolling Stone	3/5 stars
Spin	8/10

The New York Times wrote: "The thumps and the pinglike sound of searching radar create a mood in Consumed that is oceanic and hypnotic yet hardly New Age: the tension is too thick."

In a retrospective article, The A.V. Club called the album "a career highlight that stripped techno to a glacial pulse and the barren sounds of a boundless alien wasteland." In 2018, Pitchfork placed Consumed at number 34 on its list of the 50 best albums of 1998.

== Track listing ==
All tracks are written by Richie Hawtin.

No.	Title	Length
1.	"Contain"	8:29
2.	"Consume"	11:19
3.	"Passage (In)"	0:53
4.	"Cor Ten"	6:50
5.	"Convulse (Sic)"	1:22
6.	"Ekko"	3:55
7.	"Converge"	4:24
8.	"Locomotion"	8:49
9.	"In Side"	12:37
10.	"Consumed"	11:42
11.	"Passage (Out)"	3:11

== Personnel ==
Credits adapted from liner notes.

- Richie Hawtin – music, artwork concept, design
- Nilz – mastering
- Matthew Hawtin – artwork concept, design
- Ja – artwork
- Seth – artwork concept, design

== Charts ==
Chart (1998)	Peak position
UK Albums (Official Charts)	126
UK Independent Albums (Official Charts)	21

== Consumed In Key ==
In April 2022, Hawtin and the pianist Chilly Gonzales released the album Consumed in Key, a reinterpretation of Consumed.
