= Fred Giannelli =

American electronic musician (born 1960)

Fred Giannelli

Fred Giannelli (born 1960 in Lowell, Massachusetts) is an American electronic musician. He began experimenting with electronics in the 1970s as Turning Shrines. In 1984, Giannelli met Psychic TV's Genesis P. Orridge while the group was in Boston for a gig. This led to Giannelli eventually travelling to London to join the band in 1988, arriving just in time for the acid house craze. He then left Psychic TV for the Plus 8 label, working with Detroit DJ and producer Richie Hawtin as Spawn. Continuing under the Plus 8 label, he formed the Telepathic label for his own industrial/techno recordings as the Acid Didj, Giannelli, Deneuve and Mazdaratti. The 1990s saw him release a number of records, including 1997's Unpopular Science under the alias of the Kooky Scientist.

Past projects and aliases include the Kooky Scientist, Acid Didj, The Kinky Scientist, Deneuve, The Kranky Scientist, Mazdaratti, PTV, Sickmob, Splerge, Fred vom Jupiter, Fred vs. Fred, Fred Ex, Spawn (with Richie Hawtin and Daniel Bell) and Turning Shrines.
