= Dimension Intrusion =

Studio album by F.U.S.E.
- Released: June 7, 1993
- Recorded: 1991–1993
- Genres: Ambient techno; IDM
- Length: 76:26
- Labels: Plus 8; Warp
- Producer: Richie Hawtin

Richie Hawtin chronology
Dimension Intrusion (1993)	Sheet One (1993)

Artificial Intelligence series chronology
Electro-Soma (1993)	Dimension Intrusion (1993)	Ginger (1993)

Dimension Intrusion is the debut studio album by Canadian electronic music producer Richie Hawtin, credited under the alias F.U.S.E. It was released in June 1993 by Plus 8 and Warp, serving as the fifth album in Warp's Artificial Intelligence series.

According to music writer Margy Holland, Dimension Intrusion is "widely considered one of the greatest electronic albums ever".

== Critical reception ==
Professional ratings
Review scores
Source	Rating
AllMusic	4.5/5 stars
Select	4/5

Fact described Dimension Intrusion as "a record which really demonstrates Hawtin's range as a producer" and "one of his most melodic, immediate works". AllMusic stated that the album alternates between "minimalist stompers [and] more melodic, contemplative material," which made Hawtin "a perfect match for the other producers in Warp's Artificial Intelligence series."

In 2012, Fact placed it at number 38 on its list of the "100 Best Albums of the 1990s".

The album is listed in the book 501 Essential Albums of the 90s (2024); contributor Margy Holland writes that "Hawtin set out to create something in between the futurism of Detroit techno and the hypnosis of Chicago house music. The result was a variety of thumping, acid-tinged floor stompers; hypnotic songs, and minimal techno gems for the ages."

== Track listing ==
All tracks are written by Richie Hawtin.

No.	Title	Length
1.	"A New Day"	3:53
2.	"F.U."	7:45
3.	"Slac"	3:17
4.	"Dimension Intrusion"	4:03
5.	"Substance Abuse"	5:09
6.	"Train-Trac.1"	6:42
7.	"Another Time (Revisited)"	6:21
8.	"Theychx"	13:27
9.	"Uva"	8:05
10.	"Mantrax"	8:00
11.	"Nitedrive"	3:28
12.	"Into the Space"	5:02
13.	"Logikal Nonsense"	1:14

== Personnel ==
- Richie Hawtin – production, editing
- Matthew Hawtin – artwork

== Charts ==
Chart (1993)	Peak position
UK Albums (Official Charts)	63
