= From My Mind to Yours =

Studio album by Richie Hawtin
- Released: 11 December 2015
- Genre: Techno
- Length: 109:46
- Label: Plus 8
- Producer: Richie Hawtin

Richie Hawtin chronology
EX (2014)	From My Mind to Yours (2015)

Professional ratings
Review scores
Source	Rating
Pitchfork	6.5/10
Resident Advisor	3.0/5

From My Mind to Yours is a 2015 studio album by Richie Hawtin. It was released through Plus 8 on 11 December 2015 to celebrate the 25th anniversary of the record label. It features productions under Hawtin's own name and his aliases Plastikman, Robotman, Childsplay, F.U.S.E., 80xx, Circuit Breaker, and R.H.X. It peaked at number 20 on the UK Dance Albums Chart.

== Track listing ==
All tracks are written by Richie Hawtin

No.	Title	Artist	Length
1.	"No Way Back"	Richie Hawtin	12:54
2.	"Stretching"	Childsplay	6:39
3.	"Simple Simon"	Robotman	5:53
4.	"Them"	F.U.S.E.	15:56
5.	"Close"	F.U.S.E.	8:30
6.	"Purrkusiv"	Plastikman	8:49
7.	"Gymnastiks"	Plastikman	7:36
8.	"Systematic"	Circuit Breaker	7:25
9.	"Creepr"	80xx	8:00
10.	"Akrobatix"	Plastikman	8:35
11.	"Cirkus"	Plastikman	6:08
12.	"Creatur"	80xx	7:23
13.	"Grindr"	80xx	6:58
14.	"EXpanded"	Plastikman vs. F.U.S.E.	10:00
15.	"Xtension"	R.H.X.	9:00
Total length:			109:46

== Charts ==
Chart	Peak position
UK Dance Albums (OCC)	20
