= Musik (album) =

Studio album by Plastikman
- Released: November 8, 1994
- Studio: UTK (Windsor, Ontario)
- Genre: Minimal techno
- Length: 73:05
- Label: Novamute; Plus 8
- Producer: Richie Hawtin

Plastikman chronology
Recycled Plastik (1994)	Musik (1994)	Consumed (1998)

Singles from Musik
- 1. "Plastique" Released: 17 October 1994

Musik is the third studio album by Canadian electronic music producer Richie Hawtin, and his second studio album under the alias Plastikman. It was released on November 8, 1994 by Novamute Records and Plus 8 and peaked at number 58 on the UK Albums Chart. On December 6, 2024 Musik (30th Anniversary), was published as remastered for limited bio-vinyl edition and digital.

== Critical reception ==
Professional ratings
Review scores
Source	Rating
AllMusic	5/5 stars
The Guardian	4/4 stars
NME	8/10
Q	4/5 stars
The Rolling Stone Album Guide	3/5 stars
Select	4/5

In a contemporary review of Musik, Ben Turner of The Guardian stated that Hawtin is "somehow managing to salvage sounds which others feel but fail to express. Musik is music as you've never heard it before." Turner concluded that "when people look back and hail Kraftwerk, Larry Heard, DJ Pierre and Derrick May as the most influential artists in this genre, they will soon include Plastikman in this roll-call."

Jason Birchmeier of AllMusic later wrote that Musik "masterfully covers all aspects of the minimal techno spectrum, from acidic anthems to ultra-minimal explorations and back, in the process showcasing Hawtin's staggering command of the Roland 303 and 909 drum machines as well as his brilliant grasp of album-level continuity".

== Track listing ==
All tracks are written by Richie Hawtin

No.	Title	Length
1.	"Konception"	8:11
2.	"Plastique"	13:03
3.	"Kriket"	5:39
4.	"Fuk"	5:05
5.	"Outbak"	5:10
6.	"Ethnik"	9:05
7.	"Plasmatik"	5:23
8.	"Goo"	2:00
9.	"Marbles"	11:07
10.	"Lasttrak"	8:22

== Personnel ==
Credits adapted from liner notes.

- Richie Hawtin – music

== Charts ==
Chart (1994)	Peak position
Scottish Albums (OCC)	70
UK Albums (OCC)	58
