= Recycled Plastik =

EP by Plastikman
- Released: 1994
- Studio: UTK (Windsor, Ontario)
- Genre: Minimal techno
- Length: 49:43
- Label: Novamute
- Producer: Richie Hawtin

Plastikman chronology
Sheet One (1993)	Recycled Plastik (1994)	Musik (1994)

Singles from Recycled Plastik
- 1. "Spastik" Released: 4 October 1993; 2. "Krakpot" / "Elektrostatik" Released: 13 December 1993

Recycled Plastik is an extended play by Canadian electronic music producer Richie Hawtin under the alias Plastikman. It was released in 1994 by Novamute Records.

The EP, released a few months before the Plastikman album Musik, features "Spastik", which has been described as "perhaps [Hawtin's] most well-known Plastikman production, a signature track that never ceased to inspire feverish reactions among Hawtin fanatics." The remaining five tracks are likewise rooted in Hawtin's trademark minimal style.

== Critical reception ==
Professional ratings
Review scores
Source	Rating
AllMusic	4/5 stars

Jason Birchmeier of AllMusic wrote that Recycled Plastik "isn't nearly as thematic or continuous as the other Plastikman releases, [but] it functions well for what it is, an EP intended to showcase 'Spastik' and set the stage for the upcoming Musik album."

== Track listing ==
No.	Title	Length
1.	"Krakpot"	11:13
2.	"Elektrostatik"	9:59
3.	"Spaz"	7:41
4.	"Gak (Remix)"	6:52
5.	"Naturalistik"	4:39
6.	"Spastik"	9:19

== Personnel ==
Credits adapted from liner notes.

- Richie Hawtin – music, layout
- Dominic Ayre – logo design
