= DE9 Closer to the Edit =

DE9 | Closer to the Edit

Compilation album by Richie Hawtin
- Released: September 18, 2001
- Recorded: June 2001
- Studio: The Building 530
- Genres: Detroit techno, minimal techno, microhouse
- Length: 53:10
- Labels: Novamute Records, Minus
- Producer: Richie Hawtin

Richie Hawtin chronology
Decks, EFX & 909 (1999)	DE9 | Closer to the Edit (2001)	DE9 | Transitions (2005)

Professional ratings
Review scores
Source	Rating
AllMusic	4.5/5 stars
The A.V. Club	favorable
MusicOMH	favorable
Pitchfork	7.9/10

DE9 | Closer to the Edit is a 2001 compilation album by Canadian electronic musician Richie Hawtin.

Spin named it one of the 20 best albums of 2001. Resident Advisor placed it at number 16 on its list of the top 50 mixes of the 2000s.

== Track listing ==
No.	Title	Length
1.	"Range/Smart Card?/10 Strikes to 2001"	3:50
2.	"Smart Card?/10 Strikes to 2001/Monostatic/Diminishing Returns (Special Edition Dub)"	1:20
3.	"Monostatic/Diminishing Returns (Special Edition Dub)/Concept Loop U:1/Recoil/1"	1:50
4.	"Green Apple/Stereo Virus/Spastik"	0:51
5.	"Dada EP A2/Stereo Virus/Talk to Me"	0:28
6.	"Stereo Virus/Talk to Me/Diminishing Returns (Special Edition Dub)/Green Apple/4/Contain/From Pioneer to Poet (Softcore Edit)"	1:25
7.	"Orph/Diminishing Returns (Special Edition Dub)"	2:47
8.	"Silent Treatment/Diminishing Returns (Special Edition Dub)/Freek/Into the Duster"	1:18
9.	"Vacuum Cleaner/Silent Treatment/Into the Duster/Freek"	1:15
10.	"Forever Love/Bredow"	0:59
11.	"Forever Love/Courtesy Car/Into the Space/808 Loop"	2:32
12.	"Courtesy Car/Flibkà Top/Las Rambias (Forever Love)/No Milk Today"	2:18
13.	"Untitled/At the Front"	1:56
14.	"Untitled/Slacker Jack/Divisible/Muff Diver"	2:42
15.	"B1/Optical Way/A1"	1:59
16.	"Optical Way/Panna/B1/Too Distant Images/Clinicalism"	0:41
17.	"Luna (Re-Edit)/Clinicalism/Panpot Spliff"	1:01
18.	"Panpot Spliff/Gelb"	0:38
19.	"Gelb/Tea Party/Different View/Life Force/Plasticity/Kriket/Tracks on Delivery Pt. 2 (Pattern 7)"	1:03
20.	"Tea Party/Tracks on Delivery Pt. 2 (Pattern 7)/Gelb/The Climax (Original)"	2:05
21.	"Tracks on Delivery Pt. 2 (Pattern 7)/Grown"	0:47
22.	"Grown/Tracks on Delivery Pt. 2 (Pattern 7)/Loplop B1/Distortion Men"	0:55
23.	"Loplop B1/Anyway I Know You/Edit Blue"	1:56
24.	"Edit Blue/Süizgürtel/Diminishing Returns (Special Edition Dub)"	0:29
25.	"Edit Blue/Süizgürtel/Diminishing Returns (Special Edition Dub)/Formenverwandler"	2:00
26.	"Formenverwandler/Friday Night with B. Reynolds/Chemistry/Octagon/A Factory Dub/Edit Blue/Concept Loop U:2/Concept Loop U:3"	3:39
27.	"Octagon/Edit Blue/Contain/The Super/The Climax (Original)/For My Peepz"	2:56
28.	"Snatch/Lifeforce/LFO Drive"	2:00
29.	"Trinkets/Snatch/Does Ronda Know?"	0:43
30.	"B1/Snatch/Discount Baby (H.A.L. 9000 Mix)/Distortion Men/Flibkà Top/Kriket/Dekompression/B2"	2:32
31.	"Range/Dekommpression/Amenity"	2:15
