= Prebuild =

Prebuild may refer to:

- Prebuild, a technique used for pipelines such as Northern Pipeline Agency Canada and Alaska gas pipeline
- Prebuild, a method for Inventory optimization
- Prebuild (album), a 2004 album by 808 State
- "Prebuild", a track from Richie Hawtin album DE9: Transitions
- Prefabrication
- Prefab (disambiguation)
