= Marco Carola =

Italian electronic musician and DJ

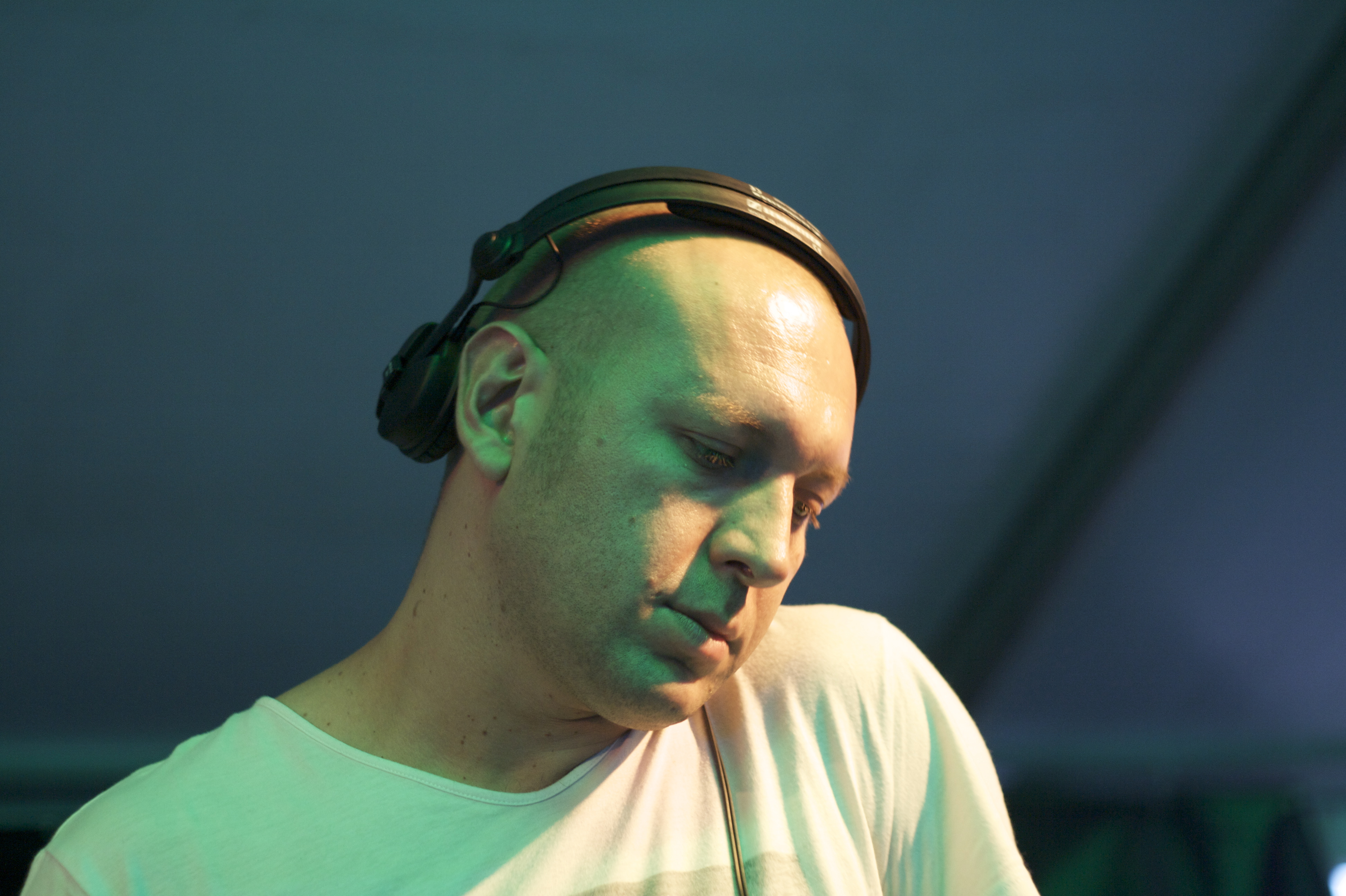

Background information
- Birth name: Marco Carola
- Born: February 7, 1975 (age 50); Naples, Campania, Italy
- Genres: Minimal techno, tech house
- Instruments: Ableton Live TR-909
- Years active: 1990–present
- Labels: Music On, Zenit, Question, Design Music, Plus 8, M-nus
- Website: marcocarola.net

Marco Carola (born February 7 of 1975, Naples, Italy) is an Italian electronic musician and DJ, who started DJing at 15 years old when he bought his first set of turntables.

== Career ==
Carola has been releasing music on labels such as Minus, Plus 8, 2M, and Primate Recordings. In addition to five albums, in 2009 and 2011, Carola was also responsible for several mix compilations.

Carola has founded labels like Design, Zenit, Question, One Thousands, Do.Mi.No. and Music On and held residencies at Amnesia Ibiza, with Cocoon, for two years, and with his own Music On project from 2012 until 2018. Music On was launched in 2011 at the Shelbourne Hotel in Miami. Luca Piccolo was also established as Carola's manager and international booker the same year.

At Sunwaves 17 in 2015 in Mamaia, Romania, Marco Carola played music for 24 hours, non-stop.

== Selected discography ==
=== DJ mix compilations ===
- Marco Carola: Fabric 31, 2006
- Time Warp Compilation 09, Time Warp, 2009
- Marco Carola And Nick Curly - Party Animals, Cocoon Recordings, 2010
- RA.252 (File, MP3, Mixed, 160), Resident Advisor, 2011
- Marco Carola - Music On Closing, 28/09/12 Live at Amnesia Ibiza, Music On 2012
- Marco Carola - Music On the Mix - IBIZA 2013, Music On 2013
- Marco Carola - Essential Music Ibiza 2014, Music On 2014
- Marco Carola - Live at BPM Festival - January 10, 2016, Music On 2016
- Marco Carola - Live at Sound Nightclub - Los Angeles, February 24, 2017, Music On 2017
- Marco Carola - Music On After Hour at Martina Beach - Playa del Carmen, Mexico. The BPM Festival, Music On 2018

=== Albums ===
- Marco Carola: "The 1000 Collection", One Thousands, 1998
- Marco Carola: "Fokus", Zenit, 1998
- Marco Carola: "Open System", Zenit, 2001
- Marco Carola: "Question 10", Question, 2002
- Marco Carola: "Play It Loud!", Minus, 2011

=== Singles & EPs ===
- Hard Melody, Subway Records, 1995
- Apollo 13, Subway Records, 1995
- Marco Carola DJ Present C.O.M.A. - Global Trip Vol. 1, XXX Records, 1996
- Design, Design Music, 1996
- Marco Carola DJ* Present C.O.M.A. - Global Trip Vol. 3, XXX Records, 1996
- Marco Carola DJ* Present C.O.M.A. - Global Trip Vol. 2, XXX Records, 1996
- Follow Me, Subway Records, 1996
- Nuclear E.P. - Creation, One Thousands, 1996
- Carola E.P. - Essence, One Thousands, 1996
- Man Train EP, i220, 1997
- Tracks For Monostress Blue, Monostress Blue, 1997
- Hypertension E.P., Primate Recordings, 1997
- Collectors Edition, One Thousands, 1997
- Pure Activity, One Thousands, 1997
- Synthetic, One Thousands, 1997
- Cosmic, One Thousands, 1997
- Mania, One Thousands, 1997
- The End, One Thousands, 1997
- Interplay, One Thousands, 1997
- Dope, One Thousands, 1997
- The Brainblister E.P., Nitric, 1997
- Eternity, Design Music, 1997
- Ante Zenit 05, Zenit, 1998
- Ante Zenit 2, Zenit, 1998
- Ante Zenit 1, Zenit, 1998
- Fragile EP, Zenit, 1999
- Marco Carola & Gaetano Parisio - Coincidence, Conform, Conform, 1999
- Sasse & Marco Carola - Be With You, Not On Label, 2000
- Ante Open System EP, Zenit, 2001
- Appendix C, Southsoul Appendix, 2002
- Marco Carola & Cisco Ferreira - Night Clan EP, Zenit, 2003
- Avalanche (Kevin Saunderson Remixes), Zenit, 2003
- Diapason EP, Zenit, 2003
- Domino 02, Domestic Minimal Noise, 2004
- do.mi.no 01, Domestic Minimal Noise, 2004
- Avalanche, Zenit, 2004
- Domino 03, Domestic Minimal Noise, 2005
- Do.mi.no 04, Domestic Minimal Noise, 2005
- 1000 Remix, ELP Medien & Verlags GmbH, 2005
- Apnea, Plus 8 Records Ltd., 2007
- Re_Solution, Minus 2M, 2007
- Plus Two, Plus 8 Records Ltd., 2008
- Bloody Cash, Plus 8 Records Ltd., 2008
- Get Set, 2M, 2008
- Plus One, Plus 8 Records Ltd., 2008
- Walking Dog, Minus, 2009
- Frankie Goes to Hollywood - Relax (Marco Carola Edit), Music On 2013
