= Sheet One =

Studio album by Plastikman
- Released: 1993
- Studios: UTK (Windsor, Ontario)
- Genres: Minimal techno; acid techno
- Length: 60:19
- Label: Novamute
- Producer: Richie Hawtin

Richie Hawtin chronology
Dimension Intrusion (1993)	Sheet One (1993)	Recycled Plastik (1994)

Sheet One is the second studio album by Canadian electronic music producer Richie Hawtin, and his debut studio album under the alias Plastikman. It was released in 1993 by Novamute Records.

== Artwork ==
The front inlay of Sheet One was perforated, giving it the look of a wall of LSD tabs. The cover was so realistic that a man in Texas was arrested when a police officer saw the CD on his car seat after pulling him over on a traffic violation in 1994.

== Critical reception ==
Professional ratings
Review scores
Source	Rating
AllMusic	4/5 stars
The Rolling Stone Album Guide	3/5 stars
Select	4/5

In 2006, Sheet One was ranked at number 74 on XLR8R's "Top 100 Albums" list. In 2015, Thump placed it at number 15 on its list of the "99 Greatest Dance Albums of All Time". In 2017, Mixmag listed it as one of the 10 best 1990s techno albums.

== Track listing ==
All tracks are written by Richie Hawtin.

No.	Title	Length
1.	"Drp"	1:45
2.	"Plasticity"	11:00
3.	"Gak"	5:38
4.	"Okx"	0:34
5.	"Helikopter"	6:30
6.	"Glob"	8:20
7.	"Plasticine"	11:19
8.	"Koma"	4:10
9.	"Vokx"	2:07
10.	"Smak"	6:42
11.	"Ovokx"	2:14

== Personnel ==
Credits adapted from liner notes.

- Richie Hawtin – music, layout
- Dominic Ayre – logo design
