= Justin James (music producer) =

Canadian electronic musician, DJ and label owner

Justin James Warnock
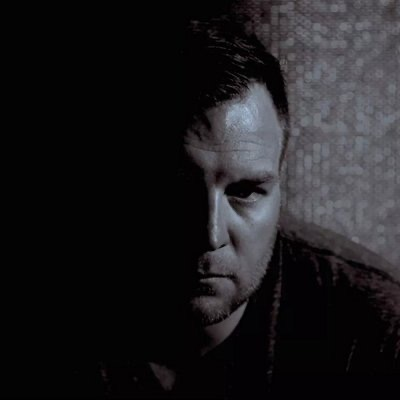
- James in 2023

Background information
- Also known as: Justin James
- Born: May 7, 1975 (age 51)
- Instruments: Synthesizers, Computers, Turn Tables
- Label: Minus (Refused)

Justin James Warnock (born May 7, 1975), commonly known by his stage name Justin James, is a Canadian electronic musician, DJ, educator and label owner. He has become an influential part of Windsor, Ontario and Detroit, Michigan’s Techno scenes. He is best known for his work with Richie Hawtin’s "Minus" records and Dubfire’s "Sci+Tec" record label, as well for his DJing techno sets making use of laptop computers and digital mixing equipment. In May 2014, James founded his own record label, Refused.

== Early life ==
James was born in Windsor, Ontario, Canada and at the age of two moved to Amherstburg, Ontario, a suburb of across the river from Detroit, the birthplace of techno. His father, James, worked as a manager at Chrysler and his mother, Marie-Claire, worked in various financial institutions. He has one sister, Nicole, who is a teacher. Love of music was introduced at early age in the household. James attended St. Thomas of Villanova Secondary School in LaSalle. Upon graduation he studied Communications Studies at the University of Windsor, focusing on film, video, photography and sound production. After earning his degree, James continued his education through teachers college earning his Bachelors of Education from the University of Windsor.

In 2011, his track 'Suck My Soul' was featured in the compilation 'New Horizons' by Richie Hawtin along with several Minus's newcomers. In 2012, the track 'City Club' appears on the CD Mix 'A Transmission' by Dubfire. In 2013, Justin released 'Shallow Dreamer' (Sci+Tec), 'Exchange' (Minus), alongside Jorge Ciccioli and NSound. On May 23, his track 'Song So True' was featured on the MINMAX compilation, consolidating James as an internationally recognized artist.

On July 25, 2015, he performed at Tomorrowland (Boom, Belgium). On October 31 of the same year, he performed at San Bernardino, California for ENTER. LA Escape: All Hallow's Eve. In 2016, he made his debut in The BPM Festival, at The Octopus Recordings Showcase.

== Selected discography ==
Release	Label	Year
Space Sleaze	refused.	2015
Planned Deviation	SCI+TEC	2015
Not The Curator	refused.	2014
Exchange	Minus	2013
Shallow Dreamer	SCI+TEC	2013

=== Remixes ===
Release	Artist	Label	Year
Jack EP	Fer BR	Trapez	2016
Prayer EP	Carlo Ruetz	Moonplay Records	2016
Anthracite Album Remixes	Sian	Octopus Recordings	2015
Meteorite EP	Julian Jeweil	Form	2015
Deep Something	Dantiez Saunderson	refused.	2015
Restored	Marc Houle	Minus	2015
Chemtrails EP	Stone Owl	Trapez	2013
Letting Go EP	Hilary Warner	Nightlight Records	2012

=== Appears on ===
Release	Label	Year
refused.one	refused.	2015
accepted., Vol. 1	refused.	2014
minMAX	Minus	2013
Dubfire - A Transmission	SCI+TEC	2012
We Get Deeper - Deep & Tech Collection Vol. 6	Recovery Tech	2012
Colors - Deep & Tech Session 10	Recovery Tech	2012
Hot N Wet Sampler, Vol. 1	Hot N Wet Music	2012
University Of Electronic Music	Recovery Tech	2012
120 Hz - Techno Selection Vol. 1	Recovery Tech	2012
