= DE9 Transitions =

DE9 | Transitions

Compilation album by Richie Hawtin
- Released: October 26, 2005
- Genres: Detroit techno, minimal music
- Length: 75:21 (CD); 97:07 (DVD)
- Labels: Novamute Records, Minus
- Producer: Richie Hawtin

Richie Hawtin chronology
DE9 | Closer to the Edit (2001)	''DE9 | Transitions'' (2005)	Electronic Adventures (2006)

Professional ratings
Review scores
Source	Rating
AllMusic	4.5/5 stars
The A.V. Club	favorable
BBC Music	favorable
Pitchfork	7.8/10
PopMatters	9/10 stars
Resident Advisor	4.5/5

DE9 | Transitions is a 2005 compilation album by Canadian electronic music artist Richie Hawtin. It contains a CD and a special edition DVD.

== Track listing ==
The CD includes tracks 1–21. The DVD has all 28 tracks.

No.	Title	Length
1.	"Welcomm(in)"	3:48
2.	"TZ Entry Point"	2:46
3.	"Adding And"	1:07
4.	"Subtracting"	2:00
5.	"Prebuild"	1:45
6.	"Seiltänzer"	3:00
7.	"Visioning"	6:52
8.	"We (All) Search"	2:45
9.	"Jupiter Lander"	0:30
10.	"Reduction And"	3:00
11.	"Seduction"	1:22
12.	"Minimal Master"	4:00
13.	"All 4 Du***"	3:00
14.	"Tonzart"	5:01
15.	"The Tunnel"	8:26
16.	"Minimission"	5:14
17.	"Noch Nah(r)"	4:11
18.	"Weiter Noch"	5:44
19.	"Where Is Mayday?"	4:00
20.	"The Hole"	2:11
21.	"(D)ecaying Beauty"	4:39
22.	"Noch Ein Mal"	2:13
23.	"Do You Know Dimbi?"	2:37
24.	"Power Nine/Six"	4:45
25.	"R2"	2:45
26.	"Regaining Control"	3:49
27.	"Ich Weiß Nicht"	4:37
28.	"Transitions"	1:12

== Charts ==
Chart	Peak position
US Top Dance/Electronic Albums (Billboard)	22
