= Mike Huckaby =

American DJ (c.1966–2020)

- Born: Michael Huckaby; 1966; Detroit, Michigan, U.S.
- Died: April 24, 2020 (aged 54); Detroit, Michigan, U.S.
- Occupations: Disc jockey, Producer
- Years active: 1995–2020

Michael Huckaby (c. 1966 – April 24, 2020) was an American DJ who produced electronic music.

== Biography ==
He began his DJ career in 1995, playing a combination of Detroit techno, groove, and jazz music.

Starting in the late 1980s, Huckaby was a widely recognized DJ in the Detroit area, holding residencies at the Motor Lounge, St. Andrew's Hall, Panacea and the Majestic Cafe.

In addition to his DJ career, Huckaby was a volunteer mentor at the non-profit Youthville program, where he taught courses in music production to young people with an interest in electronic music.

Huckaby suffered a mild stroke in early March 2020, and was hospitalized. He died from hospital-acquired COVID-19 on April 24, 2020, at age 54.

== Discography ==
- Deep Transportation Vol. 1 (1995)
- Deep Transportation Vol. 2 (1997)
- The Jazz Republic (1997)
- Harmonie Park Classics Vol. 1 (2002)
- Classics Series Vol. 2 (2004)
- My Life With The Wave (2007)
- Sessions (2007)
- My Life With The Wave 2 (2016)
