= DJ Minx =

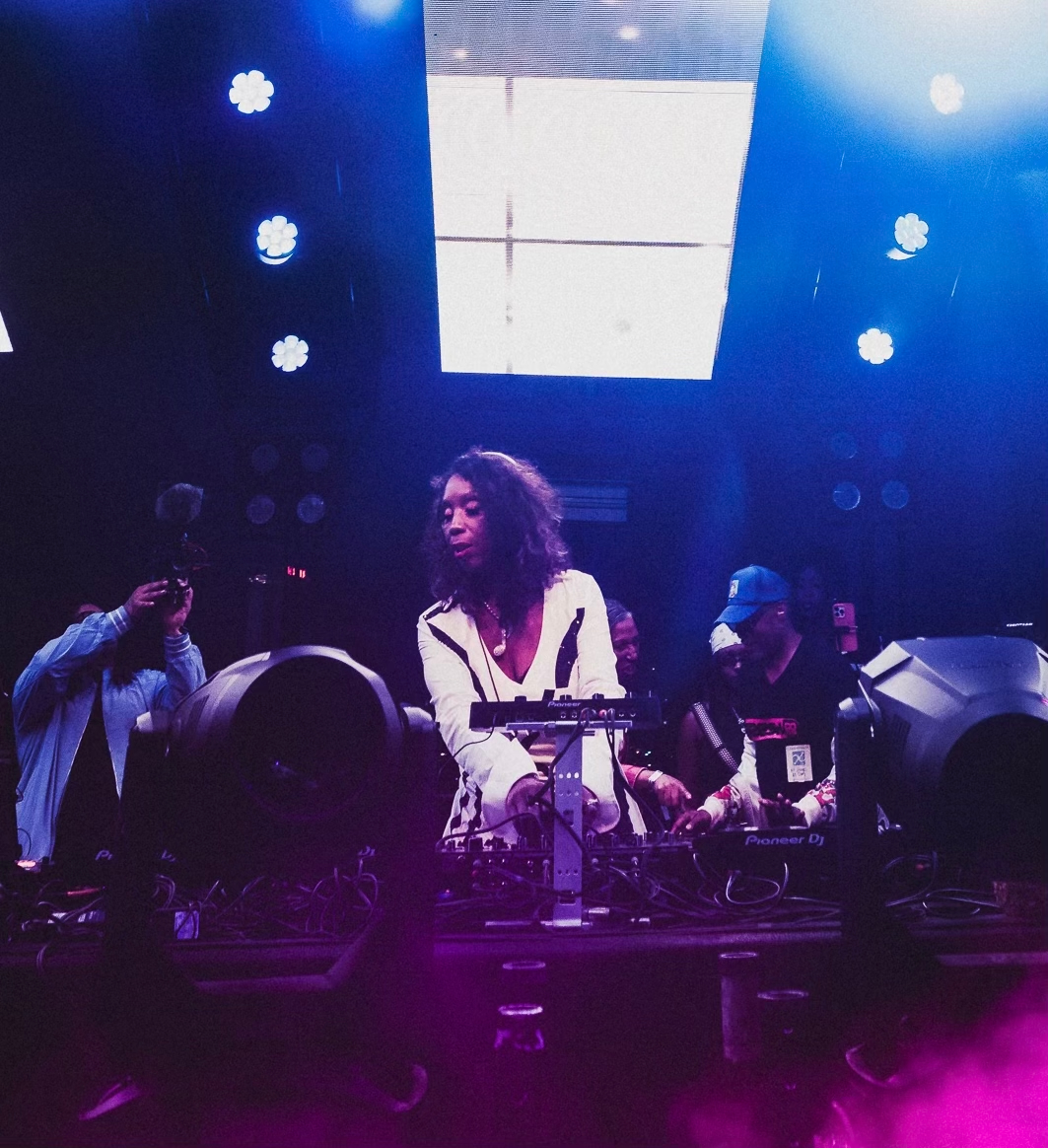
- DJ Minx @ Movement Detroit 2025

Background information
- Born: Jennifer Witcher Detroit, Michigan, U.S.
- Genres: Detroit techno, house, techno
- Occupations: DJ, producer
- Years active: 1989–present
- Label: Women on Wax Recordings

Jennifer Witcher (known as DJ Minx) is a house and techno DJ and producer from Detroit, Michigan. She is the founder of the DJ collective 'Women on Wax', and accompanying record label Women on Wax Recordings.

== Biography ==
=== Life and career ===
Witcher was born in Detroit, the youngest sibling of five children. In June 2021, as part of Pride month, Witcher came out as a lesbian.

Witcher began DJing in the 1990s, after witnessing established DJs perform at Detroit's Music Institute.

She engineered and hosted the electronic music show Deep Space Radio, on WGPR (Detroit), and hosted the University of Canada weekly radio programme Steamy Windows on CJAM 91.5 FM. She went on to become a resident of Club Motor in Hamtramck. Witcher performed at the first Detroit Electronic Music Festival in 2000, has performed at many editions of the Detroit techno festival Movement, and regularly plays at venues and large festivals across the U.S. and internationally.

In 2001, Witcher began producing, first resulting in the Introduction EP, followed by Airborne in 2001, a four-tracker which included the track "A Walk in the Park". In 2004, "A Walk in the Park" was re-released on Richie Hawtin's label, Minus. In recognition of the track’s 20th anniversary, it was remixed by Moodymann, Seth Troxler, Ardalan, and Soul Clap. DJ Minx also did an edit, which released prior to Movement Festival in 2023.

In 2015, Mixmag named her as one of the 20 women who have shaped the history of dance music, and in 2016, Time Out New York named her one of the "best house music DJs of all time". In 2018, she was awarded the Spirit of Detroit award, by the city of Detroit.

In 2020, Witcher launched the online clothing store Behind the Grüv. The following year, in recognition of Pride Month, DJ Minx's portrait was painted on the side of Detroit's Ruth Ellis Center by Philadelphia-based artist ggggrimes, and her single "Purse First" was released, with proceeds benefiting REC. She also released an EP titled Queendom on London-based HE.SHE.THEY.

Also in 2020, DJ Minx made her first appearance on BBC Radio 1's Essential Mix. Her song "Do It All Night" previously featured on Carl Craig's 2019 mix Detroit Love, Vol. 2, and was given a full release on Planet E, with remixes by Craig and Honey Dijon.

In 2023, DJ Minx performed at halftime for the Detroit Pistons, and on March 15th, 2025 she returned for a second halftime performance.

=== Women on Wax ===
In 1996, Witcher founded the DJ collective Women on Wax, a platform for female DJs from Detroit.

In 2001, she established the record label Women on Wax Recordings.
