= Daniel Bell (musician) =

American minimal techno DJ

- Born: Daniel Karl Bell; September 9, 1967 (age 59); Sacramento, California, United States
- Genres: Detroit techno; Minimal techno; Microhouse
- Occupations: Music producer, DJ
- Years active: 1991–present

Daniel Bell (born September 9, 1967) is an American minimal techno DJ. He was born in Sacramento, California, but grew up outside of Toronto, Ontario, Canada, and later moved to Detroit, where he collaborated with Richie Hawtin as Cybersonik for three years on Plus 8. In 1991, he started his own label, Accelerate, where he released a string of influential releases as DBX.

Bell was influenced primarily by Chicago house as well as the works of the minimalist composers Steve Reich and Philip Glass. His productions are characterized by minimalist house grooves accented by blips and bleeps. Some tracks feature bizarre voice effects and eerie atmospherics such as 1994's delay driven "Losing Control".

Bell moved behind the scenes to set up 7th City Distribution in November 1994. Smaller U.S.-based techno and house labels required distribution overseas and domestically and 7th City moved in to fill this void. However, by 1998, the number of active, independent techno labels in the U.S. dropped significantly and Bell closed the distribution company.

In 2000, he relocated to Berlin, Germany, and released his first mix CD, The Button-Down Mind of Daniel Bell, on Tresor Records. 2003 brought a follow-up release on Logistic Records, The Button-Down Mind Strikes Back and soon after a retrospective was released: Blip, Blurp, Bleep: The Music of Daniel Bell.

== Discography ==
=== Compilation albums ===
Year	Album details
2003	Blip, Blurp, Bleep: The Music of Daniel Bell: Release date: September 30, 2003; Label: Logistic Records
