= Prefab (disambiguation) =

Prefab is prefabrication, the practice of assembling at a manufacturing site, and transporting to the construction site.

Prefab may also refer to:

- Prefab building, a prefabricated building
  - Prefabricated home, specialist dwelling types of prefabricated building

== See also ==
- Prefabs in the UK
- Prefab Sprout, a band
