= Kenny Larkin =

American musician

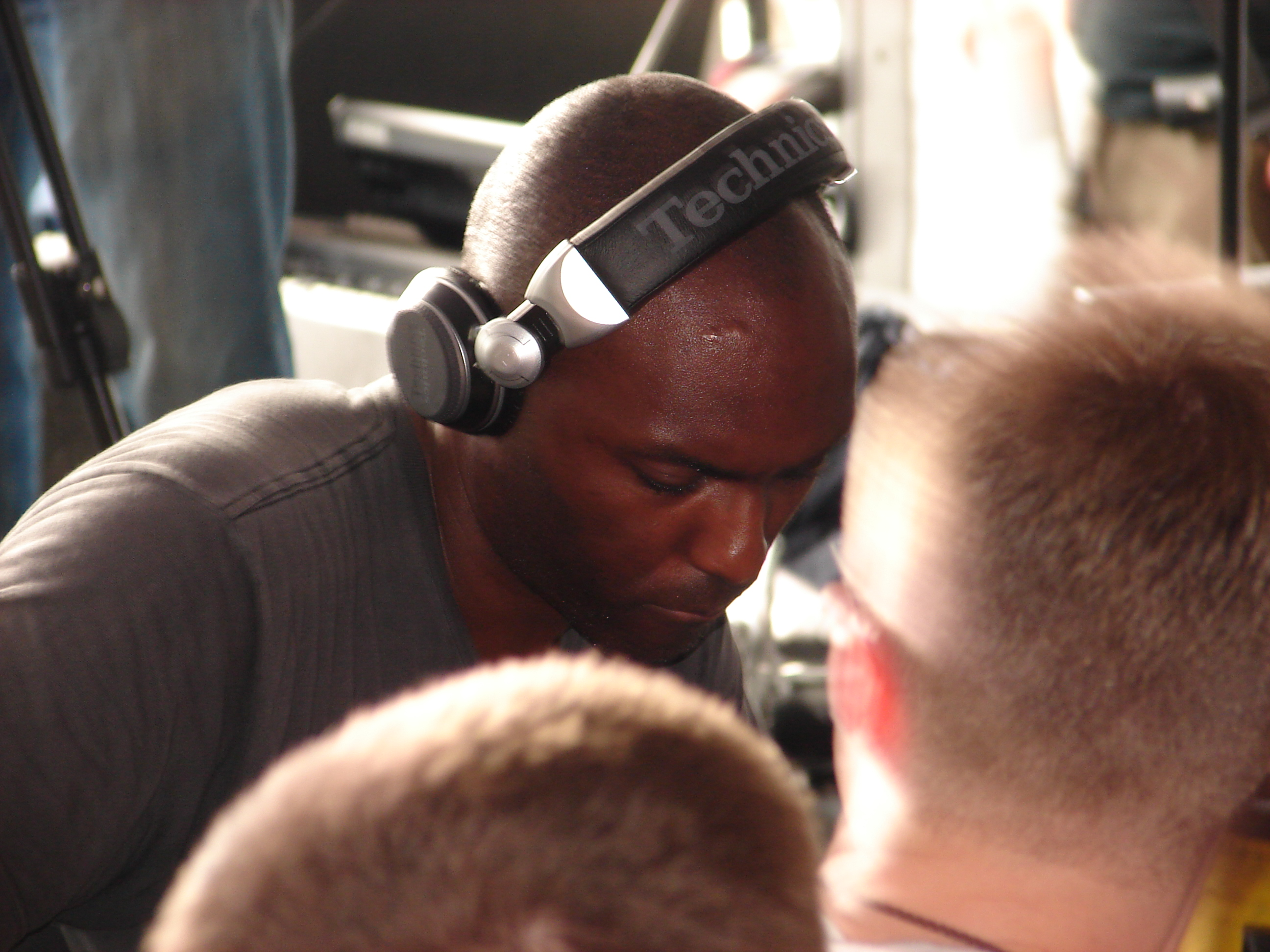
- Kenny Larkin at Detroit's Electronic Music Festival

Background information
- Also known as: Dark Comedy; Yennek; Lark Daddy; Pod; "Holy" Joe Johnson
- Born: April 6, 1968 (age 57); Detroit, Michigan, U.S.
- Genres: Detroit techno
- Occupations: Record producer; DJ
- Years active: 1990–present
- Labels: Transmat; Warp

Kenny Larkin (who also releases as Dark Comedy) is an American techno producer from Detroit. He has been described by AllMusic as "massively influential" on American, British, and German techno.

Larkin was born in 1968 and raised in Detroit, but did not participate in the early years of Detroit techno because he was serving in the military. Upon his return, he began producing, influenced by Juan Atkins and Derrick May, as well as the Chicago house music scene. His early single releases, "We Shall Overcome" and "Integration", were issued on Plus 8, a label overseen by Richie Hawtin and John Acquaviva; later releases appeared on Buzz and Warp as well as other labels. His records have seen more success in continental Europe than in the U.S.

== Discography ==
As Kenny Larkin

- We Shall Overcome Synthpunk (12"), Plus 8 Records, 1990
- Integration (12"), Plus 8 Records, 1991
- Azimuth (LP), Warp Records, 1994
- Catatonic (12"), R & S Records, 1994
- Chasers / The Shit (12"), Distance, 1995
- Metaphor (LP), R & S Records, 1995
- Loop 2 (12"), R & S Records, 1996
- Smile / Life (12"), KMS, 1999
- Ancient Beats / Seduce Her (12"), Peacefrog Records 2004
- Let Me Think (12"), Peacefrog Records, 2004
- Art of Dance (LP), Distance Records, 1998
- The Narcissist (LP), Peacefrog Records, 2004
- Dark Comedy Pt 1 (12"), Rush Hour Recordings, 2006
- Dark Comedy Pt 2 (12"), Rush Hour Recordings, 2006
- You Are... (12"), Planet E Records, 2008
- Keys, Strings, Tambourines (LP), Planet E Records, 2008

As Dark Comedy

- Corbomite Maneuver EP (12"), Transmat
- War of the Worlds / Without a Sound (12"), Art of Dance, 1992
- Seven Days (12"), Elypsia, 1996
- Plankton / Clavia's North (12"), Art of Dance, 1997
- Seven Days (LP), Elypsia, 1997
- Funkfaker: Music Saves My Soul (12"), Poussez!, 2004
- Funkfaker: Music Saves My Soul (LP), Poussez!, 2005
- Good God (12"), Poussez!, 2005
