= EX (Plastikman album) =

Studio album by Plastikman
- Released: 10 June 2014
- Recorded: 16 November 2013
- Studio: Solomon R. Guggenheim Museum
- Genre: Electronic
- Length: 53:16
- Label: Mute Records
- Producer: Richie Hawtin

Plastikman chronology
Closer (2003)	EX (2014)

EX (also referred to as EX: Live at Guggenheim, NYC) is the sixth studio album by Canadian techno musician Richie Hawtin under his Plastikman moniker, the first studio album to be released under that name in 11 years, the last studio album being 2003's Closer. It was recorded in a single session on 16 November 2013 at the Solomon R. Guggenheim Museum in New York City. The album was announced on the Mute Records website as having a digital release on 10 June 2014 with a physical release following on the 15 July 2015. The album branding echoes the large LED obelisk used for visual effects during the live performance. It peaked at number 31 on the UK Independent Albums Chart.

== Critical reception ==
Professional ratings
Aggregate scores
Source	Rating
Metacritic	72/100
Review scores
Source	Rating
AllMusic	4/5 stars
Clash	5/10
Consequence of Sound	C
Fact	2/5
Pitchfork	6.5/10
PopMatters	8/10 stars
Resident Advisor	3.0/5

Fred Thomas of AllMusic gave the album 4 stars out of 5, saying, "The sounds are by turns troubled, angry, isolated, and wonder-struck in ways that only Hawtin can sound, and Ex adds another mysterious chapter to the Plastikman story."

== Track listing ==
All tracks are written by Richie Hawtin

No.	Title	Length
1.	"EXposed"	10:34
2.	"EXtend"	5:37
3.	"EXpand"	7:56
4.	"EXtrude"	5:52
5.	"EXplore"	7:03
6.	"EXpire"	7:09
7.	"EXhale"	9:05

== Personnel ==
Credits adapted from liner notes.

- Richie Hawtin – music

== Charts ==
Chart	Peak position
UK Independent Albums (OCC)	31
