= Richie Hawtin =

British-Canadian electronic musician & DJ (born 1970)

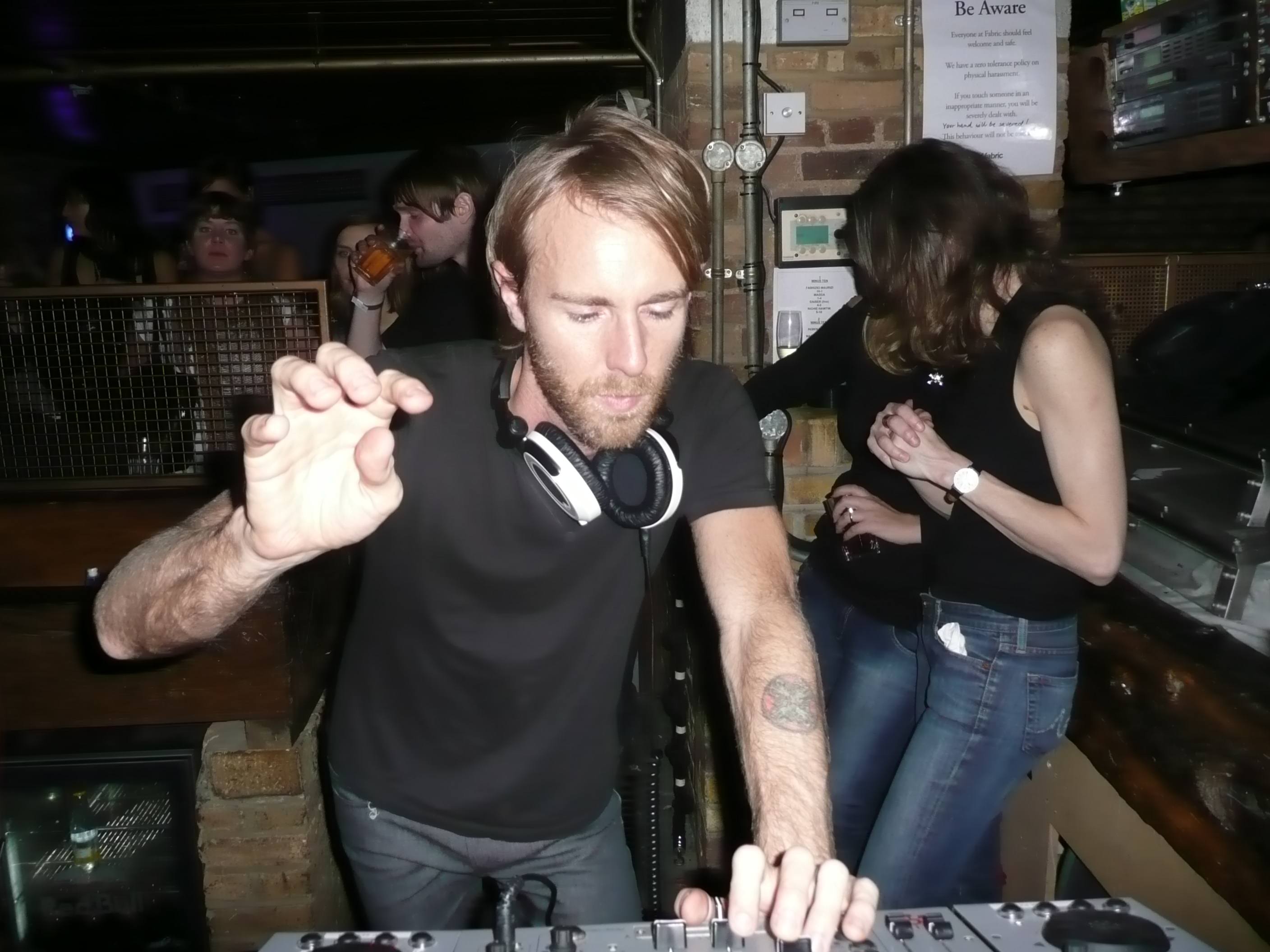
- Richie Hawtin @ Fabric, 2008

Background information
- Also known as: Plastikman, Concept 1, F.U.S.E., Forcept 1, Circuit Breaker, Robotman, Chrome, Spark, Xenon, R.H.X., Jack Master, Richard Michaels, UP!
- Born: Richard Hawtin; June 4, 1970 (age 55); Banbury, Oxfordshire, England
- Origin: LaSalle, Ontario, Canada
- Genres: Minimal techno, acid techno, IDM
- Occupations: DJ, record producer, record executive
- Years active: 1987–present
- Labels: Plus 8, M-nus, NovaMute, Warp, Probe, Definitive, From Our Minds
- Website: close.richiehawtin.com

Richard "Richie" Hawtin (born June 4, 1970) is a British-Canadian electronic musician and DJ. He became involved with Detroit techno's second wave in the early 1990s, and has been a leading exponent of minimal techno since the mid-1990s. He became known for his recordings under the Plastikman and F.U.S.E. aliases. Under the latter, he released his debut album Dimension Intrusion (1993) as part of Warp's Artificial Intelligence series.

In May 1990, Hawtin and John Acquaviva founded the Plus 8 record label, which they named after their turntable's pitch adjust function. In 1998, Hawtin launched M-nus Records. From 2012-2015, Hawtin held the ENTER. Ibiza weekly party at Space in Ibiza. In 2016, Hawtin launched his own technology company called PLAYdifferently, and released the MODEL 1 mixer, co-designed with Andy Rigby-Jones.

== Biography ==
Hawtin was born in Banbury, Oxfordshire, England, and at the age of nine moved with his parents to LaSalle, Ontario, a suburb of Windsor, Ontario, where he was raised before spending time in Detroit, MI. His father worked as a robotics technician at General Motors and was a fan of electronic music, introducing his son to Kraftwerk and Tangerine Dream at an early age. He has one brother, Matthew, who is a visual artist and ambient music DJ. Hawtin attended Sandwich Secondary High School in LaSalle.

He began to DJ in clubs at 17. He was mentored by Scott "Go-Go" Gordon at The Shelter in Detroit and his early style was a mix of house music and techno. With Canadian DJ John Acquaviva he formed the label Plus 8 in 1989 to release his own tracks under the name F.U.S.E. He dropped out of the University of Windsor, where he was studying film, and Plus 8 went on to release material by artists such as Speedy J and Kenny Larkin. Hawtin adopted his 'Plastikman' incarnation in 1993, releasing the single "Spastik" and parent album Sheet One, going on to release a number of albums and touring a live show for the next decade.

== Career ==
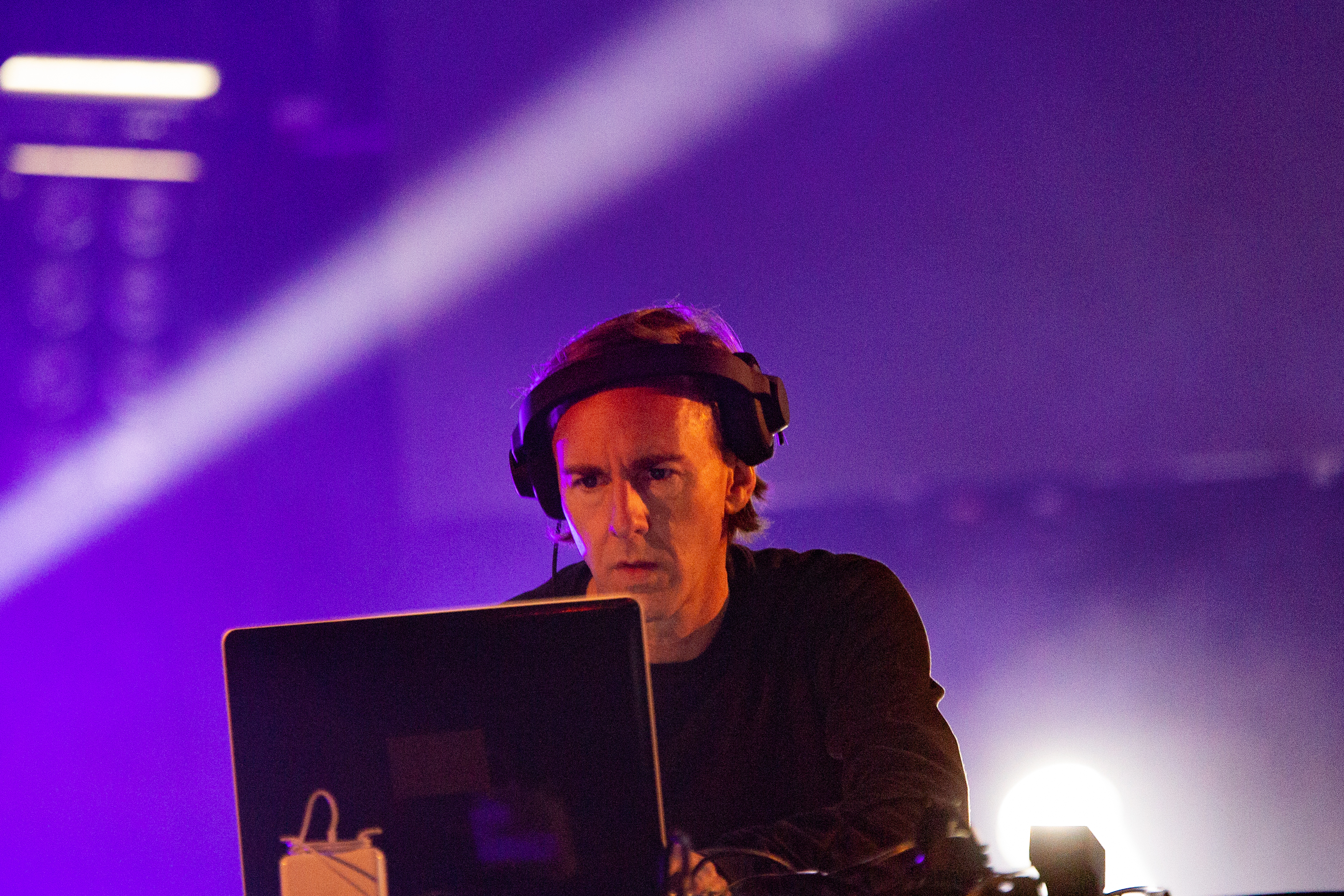
Richie Hawtin in 2018.

Hawtin was among pioneers of the Minimal techno movement that emerged in the early 1990s, where he represented a "second wave" of American producers, such as Daniel Bell, Robert Hood, Jeff Mills, Carl Craig, Kenny Larkin, and Mike Banks, associated with Detroit techno. In 1996, he released a series of monthly 12-inch singles, entitled Concept 1, which, alongside the work of Robert Hood and other producers, explored minimal techno. His M-nus label also pursued this direction. In 1999, the Decks, EFX & 909 mix album, the first in a series of three, included 38 tracks molded via effects and drum machines. In 2001, Hawtin performed at Life Fest in Windsor. He spent part of 2002 and 2003 living in New York City, before opening a label in Berlin, Germany, where he focused on his M-nus label, developing the careers of DJ-producers such as Magda, Gaiser, Marc Houle, Hearttrob and Troy Pierce.

In 2006, he collaborated with choreographer Enzo Cosimi on a composition called "9.20" for the Winter Olympics opening ceremony. He said, "Enzo and I are very much interested in pushing boundaries, both as artists and for our audiences. Working together for the Opening Ceremonies of the Winter Games delivers the creative endeavor to not only entertain a huge audience, but to also introduce them to sights and sounds that they may have never experienced before." In 2012, Hawtin worked with Loco Dice and Ean Golden in promoting Electronic Dance Music on a tour of North American universities entitled CNTRL: Beyond EDM, which included music production seminars, lessons in the music business, and live music performances.

In July 2015, Hawtin was awarded an Honorary Doctorate of Music Technology by the University of Huddersfield.

Hawtin composed and scored music for the XXth Olympic Winter Games Opening Ceremony and 1928 silent French film Brumes d’automne.

=== Recordings ===
"Substance Abuse"
"Released in 1991 under the pseudonym F.U.S.E.

Hawtin has recorded under the aliases Plastikman, F.U.S.E., Concept 1, Forcept 1, Circuit Breaker, Robotman, Chrome, Spark, Xenon, R.H.X., Jack Master, Richard Michaels and UP!. He recorded and performed, with other artists, under group names such as The Hard Brothers, Hard Trax (with his brother Matthew Hawtin), 0733, Cybersonik (with Daniel Bell and John Acquaviva), Final Exposure (with Joey Beltram and Mundo Muzique), Just For Fun (with Holger Wick), Narod Niki (with Akufen, Cabanne, Dandy Jack, Daniel Bell, Luciano, Ricardo Villalobos, Robert Henke and Thomas Franzmann), Two Guys In The Basement (with John Acquaviva), Spawn (with Fred Giannelli and Daniel Bell) and States Of Mind (with Acquaviva).

Hawtin and Pete Namlook collaborated to produce the From Within series of albums which blend minimal techno and ambient. He released a mix CD Sounds of the Third Season with Sven Väth. Slices magazine launched a series of biographies in 2007 called "Pioneers of Electronic Music"; their first issue was a 60-minute biographical documentary on Hawtin. The film follows his career from his early days crossing the border to Detroit to his current life in Berlin, and contains interviews with many colleagues and family members.

2011 saw the release of Arkives 1993 - 2010, a massive box set containing everything Hawtin has released under his Plastikman moniker, as well as a new mixed set and previously unreleased material. The collection includes CDs, vinyl, digital downloads and a DVD.

In November 2013, Hawtin performed as Plastikman at the Solomon R. Guggenheim Museum in New York City. The recording of this show was included in EX album, which was released digitally on June 10, 2014, followed with a CD release on July 15, 2014 .

On December 11, 2015, Hawtin released a fifteen-track LP titled From My Mind To Yours to commemorate the 25 year anniversary of his record label Plus 8. The album consists of all new tracks from his various aliases such as Plastikman, F.U.S.E., Robotman, R.H.X., and Circuit Breaker. In its first week, it reached the top 20 in the UK dance album charts.

Other Hawtin's collaborations include an installation performance in the Grand Palais in Paris with Anish Kapoor in 2011, Not Abstract II exhibition at the Gagosian Gallery in New York with German artist Andreas Gursky, and an audiovisual installation at 180 The Strand in London under his F.U.S.E. alias alongside his brother Matthew Hawtin, among others.

== Image and pseudonyms ==
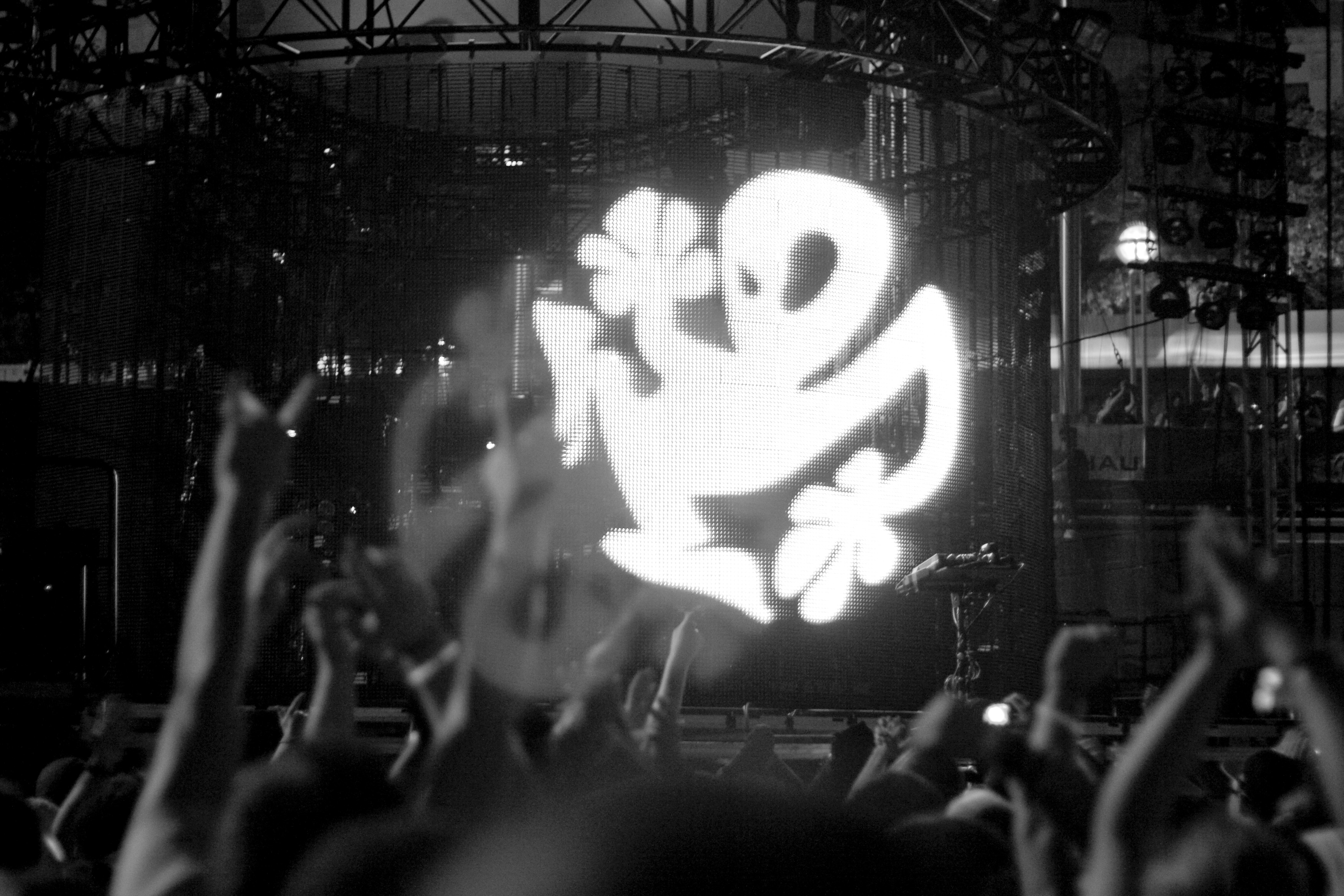
Plastikman logo at a 2010 concert

Hawtin releases music under his own name as well as aliases F.U.S.E. and Plastikman. The Plastikman logo was based on a sketch by a Californian skateboard artist and graphic designer Ron Cameron. Hawtin found the logo while looking for a typeface for Probe Records, a sister label for Plus 8, and immediately secured permission to use it, though not from Cameron himself. He stated, "When I saw the logo, it was just so perfect," opining that the logo encapsulates the "malleable, plastic, hallucinogenic, liquid" style characteristic of his early albums. It was later found that the designer who gave the permission to use the sketch did not own it, which Cameron was informed about by a fellow designer, Nate Carrico, who found the logo on a Plastikman album cover. Cameron then reached out to Hawtin via email, after which the rights were managed and they became friends.

== Entrepreneurship ==
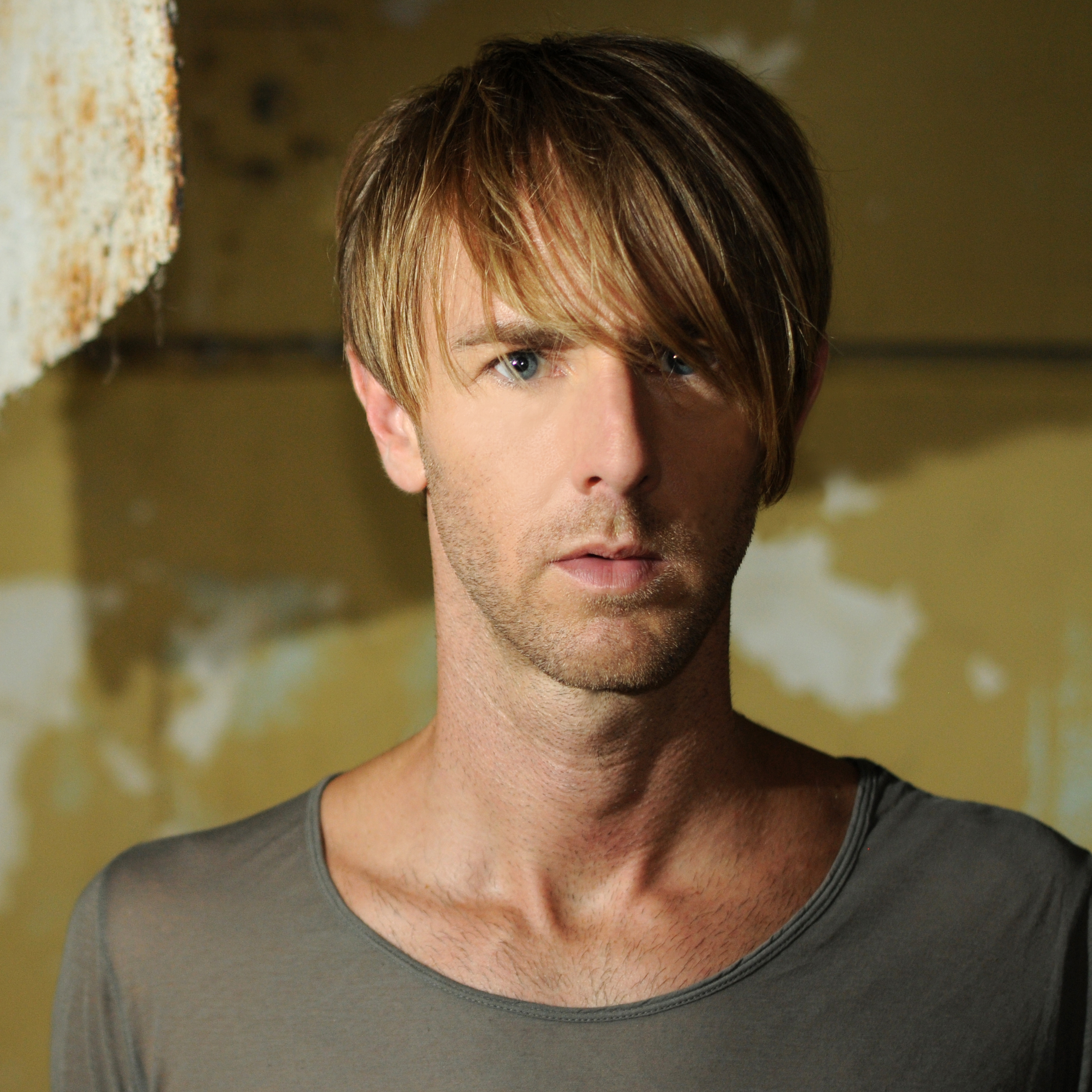
Richie Hawtin circa 2010

In 2014, Hawtin launched ENTER. SAKE, a sake brand in USA and Europe. The same year he was awarded a title of Sake Samurai.

Hawtin's established his own music technology company, called PLAYdifferently, in 2016. The first release was the MODEL 1 mixer, co-designed with the award-winning Andy Rigby-Jones. The mixer has been adopted by DJs such as Carl Cox, Jamie Jones, Loco Dice and many others.

Hawtin co-founded Plus 8 Equities, a music technology fund along with John Acquaviva, Rishi Patel, Ben Turner and Pete Tong, where Hawtin serves as chairman. According to Billboard, the funds main goal is to advance music technology and collaborate with the startups engaged in developing new technologies able to advance music industry".

In 2019, Hawtin launched his CLOSER App, a tool for deconstructing the audio from his own live performances while toggling between multiple camera angles.

== Selected discography ==
=== Albums ===
- F.U.S.E. : Dimension Intrusion, 1993
- Plastikman: Sheet One, 1993
- Richie Hawtin: From Within, 1994 (with Pete Namlook)
- Plastikman: Recycled Plastik, 1994
- Plastikman: Musik, 1994
- Richie Hawtin: From Within 2, 1995 (with Pete Namlook)
- Plastikman: Sickness (EP), 1997
- Richie Hawtin: From Within 3, 1997 (with Pete Namlook)
- Concept 1: 96:CD, 1998
- Concept 1: 96:VR, 1998 (remixed by Thomas Brinkmann)
- Plastikman: Consumed, 1998
- Plastikman: Artifakts [bc], 1998
- Plastikman: Closer, 2003
- Plastikman to the power of 9: Kompilation, 2010
- Plastikman: Arkives 1993 - 2010, 2010
- Plastikman: EX, 2014 (UK Dance No. 16)
- Richie Hawtin: From My Mind to Yours, 2015
- F.U.S.E. Computer Space (25th Anniversary Edition), 2019
- Richie Hawtin: Time Warps (EP), 2020
- Richie Hawtin: Concept 1 (Digital), 2021
- Plastikman: Musik (30th Anniversary, remastered for limited bio-vinyl edition and digital), 2024

=== Mixes / sets ===
- Richie Hawtin: Mixmag Live!, 1995 (Live DJ mix album)
- Richie Hawtin: Decks, EFX & 909, 1999 (DJ mix album)
- Richie Hawtin: DE9: Closer to the Edit, 2001 (DJ mix album)
- Richie Hawtin and Sven Väth: Sound of the Third Season, 2002 (DJ mix album)
- Richie Hawtin and Ricardo Villalobos Live at the Robert Johnson, Offenbach, Germany, 2004 (11-hour DJ set)
- Richie Hawtin: DE9 | Transitions, 2005 (DJ mix album)
- Richie Hawtin: DE9 lite: Electronic Adventures, 2006 (DJ mix album, produced with Mixmag)
- Richie Hawtin: Sounds from Can Elles, 2008 (free with DJ Magazine issue 467)
- Richie Hawtin: Mixmag presents: Richie Hawtin - New Horizons, 2012 (DJ mix album)
- Richie Hawtin: Close Combined (Glasgow, London, Tokyo – Live), 2019

== Music awards ==
=== DJ Awards ===
Hawtin has won DJ Awards' Best Techno DJ Award three times and received 17 nominations overall.

Year	Nominee / work	Award	Result
1999	Richie Hawtin	Best DJ Innovator	Nominated
2001	Richie Hawtin	Best Techno DJ	Nominated
2002	Richie Hawtin	Best Techno DJ	Won
2003	Richie Hawtin	Best Techno DJ	Nominated
2004	Richie Hawtin	Best Techno DJ	Nominated
2005	Richie Hawtin	Best Techno DJ	Nominated
2006	Richie Hawtin	Best Techno DJ	Won
2008	Richie Hawtin	Best Techno DJ	Won
2009	Richie Hawtin	Best Techno DJ	Nominated
2010	Richie Hawtin	Best International DJ	Nominated
2010	Richie Hawtin	Best Techno DJ	Nominated
2011	Richie Hawtin	Best Techno DJ	Nominated
2012	Richie Hawtin	Best Techno DJ	Nominated
2013	Richie Hawtin	Best International DJ	Nominated
2014	Richie Hawtin	Best International DJ	Nominated
2014	Richie Hawtin	Best Techno DJ	Nominated
2015	Richie Hawtin	Best Techno DJ	Nominated

=== AIM Awards ===
The Association of Independent Music (AIM) UK the AIM promotes independent artists producing their own music globally.

Year	Nominee / work	Award	Result
2014	Richie Hawtin	Outstanding Contribution	Won
