= Detroit techno =

Music genre

- Stylistic origins: Electro; industrial; Chicago house; synth-pop
- Cultural origins: Mid-1980s, Detroit, Michigan, United States

Fusion genres
- Minimal techno; ghettotech; dub techno

Detroit techno is a type of techno music that generally includes the first techno productions by Detroit-based artists during the 1980s and early 1990s, and the music made in the city since by later generations of producers. Prominent Detroit techno artists include Juan Atkins, Eddie Fowlkes, Derrick May, Jeff Mills, Kevin Saunderson, Blake Baxter, Carl Craig, K-Hand, Drexciya, Mike Banks, James Pennington and Robert Hood. Artists like Terrence Parker and his lead vocalist, Nicole Gregory, set the tone for Detroit's piano techno house sound.

The music grew out of a small scene of high school parties and radio mixes in early 1980s Detroit. The word "techno" was used as a description, but the use of the term to name and market the genre was solidified through a British compilation in 1988. From the late 1980s it developed in continuous exchange with the dance music scenes of Germany, the United Kingdom, Belgium, and the Netherlands, while at home it coexisted and overlapped with Detroit house, ghettotech and has been showcased to the world via the city's annual electronic music festival.

== Origins ==
=== Influences ===
Detroit musicians of the 1980s were inspired by the relation of science fiction themes to contemporary life, and by finding commonality between synth-pop artists such as Kraftwerk, Giorgio Moroder and Yellow Magic Orchestra and the use of synthesisers and futuristic themes African American styles such as disco and funk, and their experiments drew influence from contemporaries making electro and house. The music produced in the mid-to-late 1980s by Juan Atkins, Derrick May, and Kevin Saunderson (collectively known as The Belleville Three), along with Eddie Fowlkes, Blake Baxter, James Pennington and others is viewed as the first wave of techno from Detroit.

In exploring Detroit techno's origins, writer Kodwo Eshun maintains that "Kraftwerk are to techno what Muddy Waters is to the Rolling Stones: the authentic, the origin, the real." Juan Atkins has acknowledged that he had an early enthusiasm for Kraftwerk and Giorgio Moroder, particularly Moroder's work with Donna Summer and the producer's own album E=MC^{2}. Atkins also mentions that "around 1980, I had a tape of nothing but Kraftwerk, Telex, Devo, Giorgio Moroder and Gary Numan, and I'd ride around in my car playing it." Regarding his initial impression of Kraftwerk, Atkins notes that they were "clean and precise" relative to the "weird UFO sounds" featured in his seemingly "psychedelic" music.

Derrick May identified the influence of Kraftwerk and other European synthesizer music in commenting that "it was just classy and clean, and to us it was beautiful, like outer space. Living around Detroit, there was so little beauty... everything is an ugly mess in Detroit, and so we were attracted to this music. It, like, ignited our imagination!". May has commented that he considered his music a direct continuation of the European synthesizer tradition. He also identified Japanese synth-pop act Yellow Magic Orchestra, particularly member Ryuichi Sakamoto, and British band Ultravox, as influences, along with Kraftwerk. YMO's song "Technopolis" (1979), a tribute to Tokyo as an electronic mecca, is considered an "interesting contribution" to the development of Detroit techno, foreshadowing concepts that Atkins and Davis would later explore with Cybotron. YMO was categorized as technopop in 1980, and in 1983 they released the album The Spirit of Techno.

Kevin Saunderson has also acknowledged the influence of Europe but he claims to have been more inspired by the idea of making music with electronic equipment: "I was more infatuated with the idea that I can do this all myself."

=== The Belleville Three ===
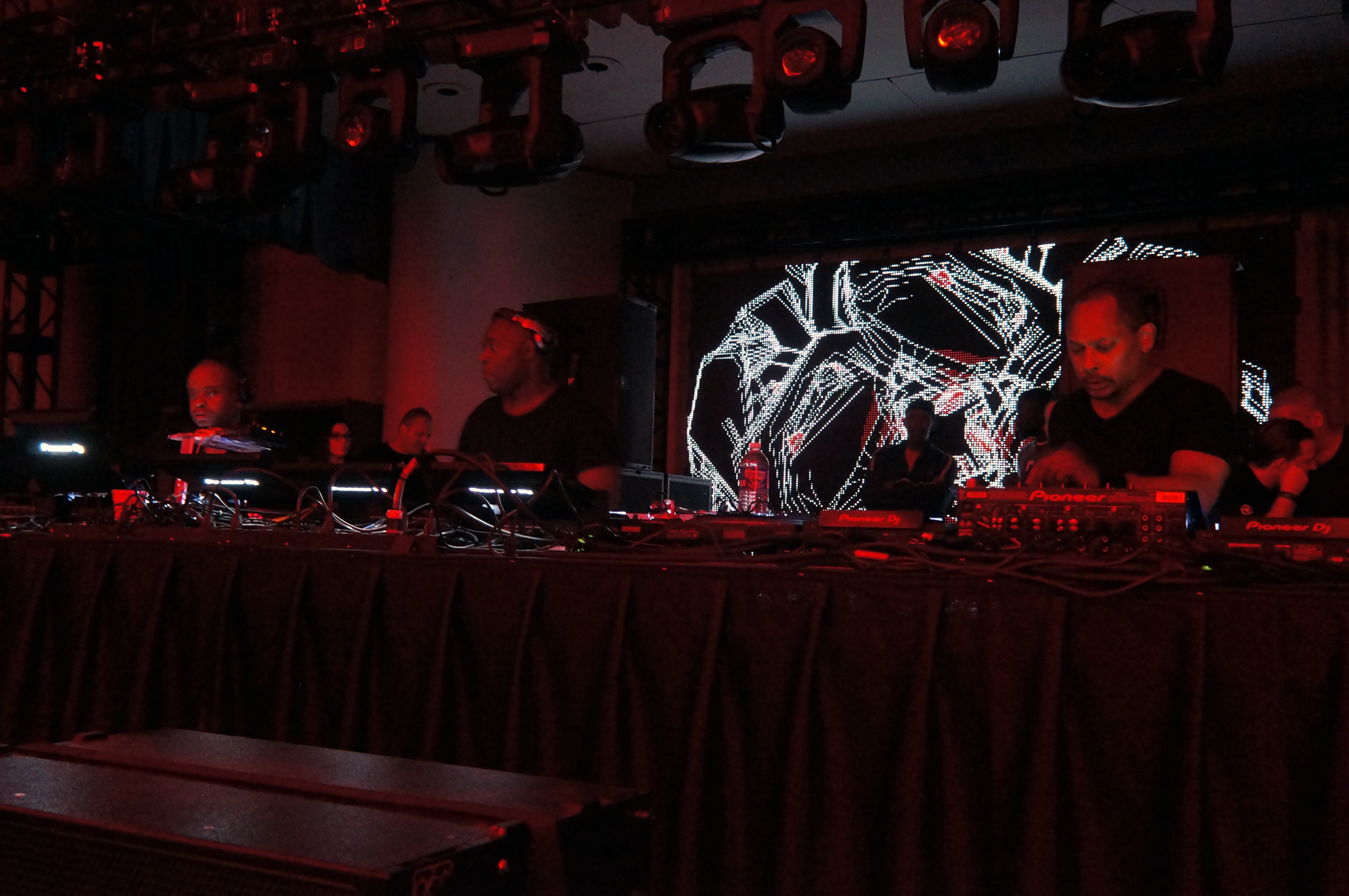
The Belleville Three performing at the Detroit Masonic Temple in 2017. From left to right: Juan Atkins, Kevin Saunderson, and Derrick May

The three individuals most closely associated with the birth of Detroit techno as a genre are Juan Atkins, Kevin Saunderson and Derrick May, also known as the "Belleville Three". The three, who were high school friends from Belleville, Michigan, created electronic music tracks in their basement(s). Derrick May once described Detroit techno music as being a "complete mistake ... like George Clinton and Kraftwerk caught in an elevator, with only a sequencer to keep them company."

The three teenage friends bonded while listening to an eclectic mix of music: Yellow Magic Orchestra, Kraftwerk, Bootsy, Parliament, Prince, Depeche Mode, and The B-52's. Juan Atkins was inspired to buy a synthesizer after hearing Parliament. Atkins was also the first in the group to take up turntablism, teaching May and Saunderson how to DJ.

Under the name Deep Space Soundworks, Atkins and May began to DJ on Detroit's party circuit. By 1981, Mojo was playing the record mixes recorded by the Belleville Three, who were also branching out to work with other musicians. The trio traveled to Chicago to investigate the house music scene there, particularly the Chicago DJs Ron Hardy and Frankie Knuckles. House was a natural progression from disco music, so that the trio began to formulate the synthesis of this dance music with the mechanical sounds of groups like Kraftwerk, in a way that reflected post-industrialist Detroit. An obsession with the future and its machines is reflected in much of their music, because, according to Atkins, Detroit is the most advanced in the transition away from industrialism.

Juan Atkins has been lauded as the "Godfather of Techno" (or "Originator"), while Derrick May is thought of as the "Innovator" and Kevin Saunderson is often referred to as the "Elevator"

=== School days and the party scene ===
Prior to achieving notability, Atkins, Saunderson, May, and Fowlkes shared common interests as budding musicians, "mix" tape traders, and aspiring DJs. They also found musical inspiration via the Midnight Funk Association, an eclectic five-hour late-night radio program hosted on various Detroit radio stations, including WCHB, WGPR, and WJLB-FM from 1977 through the mid-1980s by DJ Charles "The Electrifying Mojo" Johnson. Mojo's show featured electronic music by artists such as Giorgio Moroder, Kraftwerk, Yellow Magic Orchestra and Tangerine Dream, alongside the funk sounds of acts such as Parliament Funkadelic and dance oriented new wave music by bands like Devo and the B-52's. Atkins has noted:

He [Mojo] played all the Parliament and Funkadelic that anybody ever wanted to hear. Those two groups were really big in Detroit at the time. In fact, they were one of the main reasons why disco didn't really grab hold in Detroit in '79. Mojo used to play a lot of funk just to be different from all the other stations that had gone over to disco. When 'Knee Deep' came out, that just put the last nail in the coffin of disco music.

Despite the short-lived disco boom in Detroit, it had the effect of inspiring many individuals to take up mixing, Juan Atkins among them. Subsequently, Atkins taught May how to mix records, and in 1981, "Magic Juan", Derrick "Mayday", in conjunction with three other DJ's, one of whom was Eddie "Flashin" Fowlkes, launched themselves as a party crew called Deep Space Soundworks (also referred to as Deep Space). In 1980 or 1981, they met with Mojo and proposed that they provide mixes for his show, which they did end up doing the following year.

During the late 1970s and early 1980s, high school clubs such as Brats, Charivari, Ciabattino, Gables, Rafael and Snobs allowed the young promoters to develop and nurture a local dance music scene. As the local scene grew in popularity, DJs began to band together to market their mixing skills and sound systems to clubs that were hoping to attract larger audiences. Local church activity centers, vacant warehouses, offices, and YMCA auditoriums were the early locations where the musical form was nurtured.

The club scene created by techno in Detroit was a way for Black suburban youth in Detroit to distance themselves from "jits", slang for lower class African Americans living in the inner city. "Prep parties" were obsessed with flaunting wealth and incorporated many aspects of European culture including club names like Plush, Charivari, and GQ Productions, reflecting European fashion and luxury, because Europe signified high class. In addition prep parties were run as private clubs and restricted who could enter based on dress and appearance. Party flyers were also an attempt to restrict and distance lower class individuals from the middle class club scene.

May said that the suburban setting afforded a different setting in which to experience the music. "We perceived the music differently than you would if you encountered it in dance clubs. We'd sit back with the lights off and listen to records by Bootsy and Yellow Magic Orchestra. We never took it as just entertainment, we took it as a serious philosophy," he recalls.

=== Juan Atkins, Cybotron and Metroplex ===
Of the four individuals responsible for establishing techno as a genre in its own right, Juan Atkins is widely cited as "The Originator". In 1995, the American music technology publication Keyboard Magazine honored him as one of 12 Who Count in the history of keyboard music.

In the early 1980s, Atkins began recording with musical partner Richard Davis (and later with a third member, Jon-5) as Cybotron. This trio released a number of rock and electro-inspired tunes, the most successful of which were Clear (1983) and its moodier followup, "Techno City" (1984).

Atkins used the term techno to describe Cybotron's music, taking inspiration from Futurist author Alvin Toffler, the original source for words such as cybotron and metroplex. Atkins has described earlier synthesizer based acts like Kraftwerk as techno, although many would consider both Kraftwerk's and Juan's Cybotron outputs as electro. Atkins viewed Cybotron's Cosmic Cars (1982) as unique, Germanic, synthesized funk, but he later heard Afrika Bambaataa's "Planet Rock" (1982) and considered it to be a superior example of the music he envisioned. Inspired, he resolved to continue experimenting, and he encouraged Saunderson and May to do likewise.

Eventually, Atkins started producing his own music under the pseudonym Model 500, and in 1985 he established the record label Metroplex. The same year saw an important turning point for the Detroit scene with the release of Model 500's "No UFO's," a seminal work that is generally considered the first techno production. Of this time, Atkins has said:

When I started Metroplex around February or March of '85 and released "No UFO's," I thought I was just going to make my money back on it, but I wound up selling between 10,000 and 15,000 copies. I had no idea that my record would happen in Chicago. Derrick's parents had moved there, and he was making regular trips between Detroit and Chicago. So when I came out with 'No UFO's,' he took copies out to Chicago and gave them to some DJs, and it just happened.

Metroplex also gave early platforms to Kevin Saunderson and Eddie Fowlkes.

=== Chicago ===
The music's producers, especially May and Saunderson, admit to having been fascinated by the Chicago club scene and influenced by house in particular. May's 1987 hit "Strings of Life" (released under the alias Rhythim Is Rhythim [sic]) is considered a classic in both the house and techno genres.

Juan Atkins also believes that the first acid house producers, seeking to distance house music from disco, emulated the techno sound. Atkins also suggests that the Chicago house sound developed as a result of Frankie Knuckles' using a drum machine he bought from Derrick May. He claims:

Derrick sold Chicago DJ Frankie Knuckles a TR909 drum machine. This was back when the Powerplant was open in Chicago, but before any of the Chicago DJs were making records. They were all into playing Italian imports; 'No UFOs' was the only U.S.-based independent record that they played. So Frankie Knuckles started using the 909 at his shows at the Powerplant. Boss had just brought out their little sampling footpedal, and somebody took one along there. Somebody was on the mic, and they sampled that and played it over the drumtrack pattern. Having got the drum machine and the sampler, they could make their own tunes to play at parties. One thing just led to another, and Chip E used the 909 to make his own record, and from then on, all these DJs in Chicago borrowed that 909 to come out with their own records.

== The Detroit sound ==
The early producers, enabled by the increasing affordability of sequencers and synthesizers, merged a European synth-pop aesthetic with aspects of soul, funk, disco, and electro, pushing EDM into uncharted terrain. They deliberately rejected the Motown legacy and traditional formulas of R&B and soul, and instead embraced technological experimentation.

Within the last 5 years or so, the Detroit underground has been experimenting with technology, stretching it rather than simply using it. As the price of sequencers and synthesizers has dropped, so the experimentation has become more intense. Basically, we're tired of hearing about being in love or falling out, tired of the R&B system, so a new progressive sound has emerged. We call it techno!

— Juan Atkins, 1988

The resulting Detroit sound was interpreted by Derrick May and one journalist in 1988 as a "post-soul" sound with no debt to Motown, but by another journalist a decade later as "soulful grooves" melding the beat-centric styles of Motown with the music technology of the time. May described the sound of techno as something that is "...like Detroit...a complete mistake. It's like George Clinton and Kraftwerk are stuck in an elevator with only a sequencer to keep them company." Juan Atkins has stated that it is "music that sounds like technology, and not technology that sounds like music, meaning that most of the music you listen to is made with technology, whether you know it or not. But with techno music, you know it."

One of the first Detroit productions to receive wider attention was Derrick May's "Strings of Life" (1987), which, together with May's previous release, "Nude Photo" (1987), helped raise techno's profile in Europe, especially the UK and Germany, during the 1987–1988 house music boom (see Second Summer of Love). It became May's best known track, which, according to Frankie Knuckles, "just exploded. It was like something you can't imagine, the kind of power and energy people got off that record when it was first heard. Mike Dunn says he has no idea how people can accept a record that doesn't have a bassline." The track "hit Britain in an especially big way during the country's 1987–1988 house explosion."

== Futurism ==
What distinguishes Detroit Techno from its European variants is the way it more directly works the interface of funk and futurism ... but the desire to play up the genre's futuristic side often means the second half of the equation gets dropped.

— Mike Shallcross

One of Techno’s innovators, Juan Atkins, references how P-funk, also known as Parliament-Funkadelic, was one of the first musical groups to influence his techno/futuristic sound and aesthetic (for example the group's Mothership Connection stage-prop and album along with their unique cover art on other albums). The founding of Techno, being partially rooted in the intergalactic visions of funk, speaks to arguments from Schaub’s work that “‘Techno also represented an idealistic vision of music and a future culture that could exist free from the limitations, prejudice, and preconceptions that the Detroit urban environment manifested.” In this context, Techno strives not to fixate on gatekeeping the genre for Black people. Instead, its objective was to illuminate the role of music, vibrations, industrial sounds, and club culture to unify all people under the possession of techno music.

These early Detroit techno artists employed science fiction imagery to articulate their visions of a transformed society.

=== Afrofuturism ===
The three artists all contribute to the discourse of Afrofuturism through their re-purposing of technology to create a new form of music that appealed to a marginalized underground population. Especially within the context of Detroit, where the rise of robotics led to a massive loss of jobs around the time these three were growing up, technology is very relevant. The process "took technology, and made it a Black secret."

The sound is both futuristic and extraterrestrial, touching on the "otherness" central to Afrofuturist content. According to one critic, it was a "deprived sound trying to get out." Tukufu Zuberi explains that electronic music can be multiracial and that critics should pay attention to "not just sound aesthetics but the production process and institutions created by black musicians."

== Techno! The New Dance Sound of Detroit ==
In 1988, due to the popularity of house and acid house music in Great Britain, Virgin Records talent scout Neil Rushton contacted Derrick May with a view to finding out more about the Detroit scene. To define the Detroit sound as being distinct from Chicago house, Rushton and the Belleville Three chose the word "techno" for their tracks, a term that Atkins had been using since his Cybotron days ("Techno City" was an early single).

The mid-1988 UK release of Techno! The New Dance Sound of Detroit, an album compiled by ex-Northern Soul DJ and Kool Kat Records boss Neil Rushton (at the time an A&R scout for Virgin's "10 Records" imprint) and Derrick May, introduced of the word techno to UK audiences. Although the compilation put techno into the lexicon of music journalism in the UK, the music was initially viewed as Detroit's interpretation of Chicago house rather than as a separate genre. The compilation's working title had been The House Sound of Detroit until the addition of Atkins' song "Techno Music" prompted reconsideration. Rushton was later quoted as saying he, Atkins, May, and Saunderson came up with the compilation's final name together, and that the Belleville Three voted down calling the music some kind of regional brand of house; they instead favored a term they were already using, techno.

Derrick May views this as one of his busiest times and recalls that it was a period where he

I was working with Carl Craig, helping Kevin, helping Juan, trying to put Neil Rushton in the right position to meet everybody, trying to get Blake Baxter endorsed so that everyone liked him, trying to convince Shake (Anthony Shakir) that he should be more assertive... and keep making music as well as do the Mayday mix (for the show Street Beat on Detroit's WJLB radio station) and run Transmat records.

Commercially, the release did not fare as well and failed to recoup, but Inner City's production "Big Fun" (1988), a track that was almost not included on the compilation, became a crossover hit in fall 1988. The record was also responsible for bringing industry attention to May, Atkins and Saunderson, which led to discussions with ZTT records about forming a techno supergroup called Intellex. But, when the group were on the verge of finalising their contract, May allegedly refused to agree to Top of the Pops appearances and negotiations collapsed. According to May, ZTT label boss Trevor Horn had envisaged that the trio would be marketed as a "Black Petshop Boys."

Despite Virgin Records' disappointment with the poor sales of Rushton's compilation, the record was successful in establishing an identity for techno and was instrumental in creating a platform in Europe for both the music and its producers. Ultimately, the release served to distinguish the Detroit sound from Chicago house and other forms of underground dance music that were emerging during the rave era of the late 1980s and early 1990s, a period during which techno became more adventurous and distinct.

== The Music Institute ==
Inspired by Chicago's house clubs, Chez Damier, Alton Miller and George Baker started a club of their own in downtown Detroit, named The Music Institute at 1315 Broadway. The club helped unite a previously scattered scene into an underground "family", where May, Atkins, and Saunderson DJed with fellow pioneers like Eddie "Flashin" Fowlkes and Blake Baxter. It allowed for collaboration, and helped inspire what would become the second wave of Detroit-area techno, which included artists whom the Belleville Three had influenced and mentored.

In mid-1988, developments in the Detroit scene led to the opening of a nightclub called the Music Institute (MI), located at 1315 Broadway in downtown Detroit. The venue was secured by George Baker and Alton Miller with Darryl Wynn and Derrick May participating as Friday night DJs, and Baker and Chez Damier playing to a mostly gay crowd on Saturday nights.

The club closed on 24 November 1989, with Derrick May playing "Strings of Life" along with a recording of clock tower bells. May explains:

It all happened at the right time by mistake, and it didn't last because it wasn't supposed to last. Our careers took off right around the time we [the MI] had to close, and maybe it was the best thing. I think we were peaking – we were so full of energy and we didn't know who we were or [how to] realize our potential. We had no inhibitions, no standards, we just did it. That's why it came off so fresh and innovative, and that's why ... we got the best of the best.

Though short-lived, MI was known internationally for its all-night sets, its sparse white rooms, and its juice bar stocked with "smart drinks" (the Institute never served liquor). The MI, notes Dan Sicko, along with Detroit's early techno pioneers, "helped give life to one of the city's important musical subcultures – one that was slowly growing into an international scene."

== Second wave ==
=== Artists and labels ===
The first wave of Detroit techno had peaked in 1988–89, with the popularity of artists like Derrick May, Kevin Saunderson, Blake Baxter, and Chez Damier, and clubs like St. Andrews Hall, Majestic Theater, The Shelter, and the Music Institute. At the same time, Detroit techno benefited from the growth of the European rave scene and various licensing deals with labels in the UK, including Kool Kat Records. By 1989 May's Strings of Life had achieved "anthemic" status. several years after its recording.

By the early 1990s, a second wave of Detroit artists started to break through, including, among others, Carl Craig, Underground Resistance (featuring Mike Banks, Jeff Mills, and Robert Hood), Jay Denham, and Octave One.

The second wave was broad in sound. Carl Craig, who had played drum machine and synthesizers in Derrick May's live band and released his first records on Transmat, founded Planet E Communications in 1991 and became known for jazz-inflected, cerebral techno. Kenny Larkin and Stacey Pullen developed melodic, musically elaborate styles; Pullen, who started going to the Music Institute after leaving college in 1989, learned production in May's studio alongside the Transmat engineer Jay Denham, and recalled May telling him to stop using May's own sounds and find his own. Other figures to emerge from 1990 onward included Mike Huckaby, Claude Young, Daniel Bell, Brett Dancer and Scott Grooves.

Kelli Hand, known as K-Hand, founded the label UK House Records in 1990, renaming it Acacia Records the same year after a Detroit street, and the label became an important outlet for both house and second-wave techno. One of very few women producing and DJing in the scene, she was the first Detroit producer to release music on the British label Warp, in 1994, and the first artist to release an album on Studio !K7, in 1995. She also released early records on the Belgian label Global Cuts and built close ties with Germany, and in 2017 Detroit City Council recognized her as "the first lady of Detroit".

Transmat also drew in producers from outside the city. The Chicago house producer K-Alexi Shelby, who recorded for Trax and DJ International, released the All for Lee-Sah EP on Transmat in 1989, and later recorded for European labels including ACV and Djax-Up-Beats, an example of the traffic between the two cities' scenes.

=== Underground Resistance and Plus 8 ===
According to music journalist Simon Reynolds, in the same period what began as a Europhile fantasy of elegance and refinement was, ironically, transformed by British and European producers into a "vulgar uproar for E'd-up mobs: anthemic, cheesily sentimental, unabashedly drug-crazed." Detroit embraced this maximalism and created its own variant of acid house and techno. The result was a harsh Detroit hardcore full of riffs and industrial bleakness. Two major labels of this sound were Underground Resistance and +8, both of which mixed 1980s electro, UK synth-pop and industrial paralleling the brutalism of rave music of Europe.

Underground Resistance's music embodied a kind of abstract militancy, by presenting themselves as a paramilitary group fighting against commercial mainstream entertainment industry who they called "the programmers" in their tracks such as Predator, Elimination, Riot or Death Star. Similarly, the label +8 was formed by Richie Hawtin and John Acquaviva which evolved from industrial hardcore to a minimalist progressive techno sound. As friendly rivals to Underground Resistance, +8 pushed up the speed of their songs faster and fiercer in tracks like Vortex.

Underground Resistance (UR) was formed by Jeff Mills and Mike Banks, who were later joined by Robert Hood, after Mills's earlier project Final Cut ended. Modelling itself on the independence of Metroplex, KMS and Transmat, UR gave the music a more explicitly political purpose through releases such as "Fuck the Majors", and its label went on to issue records by Blake Baxter, DJ Rolando and Drexciya.

== Exchange with Europe ==
Detroit techno's audience in the late 1980s and early 1990s was larger in Europe than in the United States, and the music developed in dialogue with European scenes rather than in isolation.

=== Rave and the UK ===
Detroit producers responded directly to the European rave sounds that had grown partly out of their own records. In 1991 Atkins and Fowlkes released the tracks "Escape" and "Modulation" as outPut, which fed elements of British breakbeat hardcore and Belgian rave back into the Detroit sound.

Carl Craig's 1992 track "Bug in the Bassbin", released under the name Innerzone Orchestra, set a jazz-influenced breakbeat against Craig's synthesizers. DJs in the UK played it pitched up from 33 to 45 rpm, and it was picked up by 4hero, Goldie and others in the early jungle and drum and bass scene; Craig later said he had been aware of British breakbeat records such as those on Shut Up and Dance's label but had no idea the track would inspire drum and bass. Mo' Wax reissued it in 1996 with remixes by Peshay, Claude Young, 4hero and Kirk Degiorgio.

Detroit and Windsor producers were also central to the British idea of "electronic listening music". Warp's 1992 compilation Artificial Intelligence included Richie Hawtin under the alias UP! alongside Aphex Twin, Autechre, B12 and Speedy J, and Hawtin's F.U.S.E. album Dimension Intrusion (1993) was released in the label's subsequent Artificial Intelligence series. Many of the UK Artificial Intelligence artists explicitly stated they were inspired by Detroit. Kenny Larkin's album Azimuth followed on Warp in 1994.

=== Berlin ===
The Berlin club Tresor, opened by Dimitri Hegemann in March 1991, and its record label became the main point of contact between Detroit and Germany. Its first release was Underground Resistance's "Sonic Destroyer", credited to X-101, and many Detroit artists, including Blake Baxter, Eddie Fowlkes and Juan Atkins, played their first Berlin shows there. Atkins and Fowlkes recorded with Thomas Fehlmann and Moritz von Oswald as 3MB in 1992, and Atkins continued to work with Tresor under the alias Infiniti, whose stripped-back productions influenced minimalists such as Robert Hood. Fowlkes described his own blend of the two cities' sounds as "techno soul", releasing The Birth of Technosoul with 3MB on Tresor in 1993.

== Detroit house ==
House music had been made in Detroit since before techno had a name, and the two styles were not clearly separated in the city's early scene. From the mid-1990s a group of producers including Moodymann (Kenny Dixon Jr.), Theo Parrish, Rick Wilhite and Marcellus Pittman, who also worked together as 3 Chairs, developed a distinctive, sample-based and often deliberately rough Detroit house sound drawing on soul, disco, jazz and gospel. Moodymann founded his KDJ label in 1994, and his early work was championed by Carl Craig, whose Planet E released it alongside techno. With later producers such as Omar S, they gave Detroit an international reputation for house as well as techno.

Carl Craig's Detroit Love project, launched at the Amsterdam Dance Event in 2014 and brought to Detroit the following March, presents the city's techno and house artists together. The touring event series has featured Craig with Moodymann, Waajeed and DJ Minx, and Planet E's accompanying Detroit Love mix series has included volumes by Stacey Pullen (2018) and DJ Holographic (2021).

== Ghettotech and jit ==
Alongside techno's international profile, Detroit developed a fast, raw local club music combining electro, Miami bass, ghetto house and techno with crude, repetitive vocals. Its roots lay in the scratching and fast mixing of Detroit radio and club DJs, including Jeff Mills in his early guise as "the Wizard". In the mid-1990s DJ Assault and DJ Godfather shaped the style on labels such as Electrofunk and Databass. The name "ghettotech" was coined by a fan in Ann Arbor; DJ Assault rejects it and prefers "Detroit booty music".

The music is closely tied to jit, a Detroit street dance of fast footwork, drops and spins whose roots go back to the Jitterbugs dance crew of the 1970s. Its current form matured in the 1990s and 2000s, at the same time as Detroit techno was gaining its European following, and it often overlapped with Chicago's juke and footwork scene. Ghettotech was also a regular feature of the Detroit Electronic Music Festival.

== Detroit Electronic Music Festival and Movement ==
On Memorial Day weekend of 2000, electronic music fans from around the globe made a pilgrimage to Hart Plaza on the banks of the Detroit River and experienced the first Detroit Electronic Music Festival. In 2003, the festival management changed the name to Movement, then Fuse-In (2005), and most recently, Movement: Detroit's Electronic Music Festival (2007). The festival is a showcase for DJs and performers across all genres of electronic music, takes course over a period of three days, and is considered to be the best underground electronic music festival in the United States.

Juan Atkins, Kevin Saunderson, and Derrick May remain active in the music scene today. In 2000, the first annual Detroit Electronic Music Festival was held. In 2004, May assumed control of the festival, renamed Movement. He invested his own funds into the festival, and "got severely wounded financially." Kevin Saunderson helmed the festival, renamed FUSE IN, the following year. Saunderson, May, and Carl Craig all performed but did not produce the festival in 2006, when it was again called Movement. Saunderson returned to perform at the 2007 Movement as well.

The festival nearly ended after Saunderson withdrew in early 2006, but the Detroit promoters Paxahau, who had run its afterparties, took it over that year under the name Movement and have produced it since. Under Paxahau it became a ticketed event, with attendance growing from about 41,000 in 2006 to nearly 78,000 in 2008, when turnstiles were first used to count it, and past 100,000 over three days by the mid-2010s. Writers have credited the festival, and the growth of "techno tourism" in the 2010s, with drawing increasing numbers of overseas visitors to the city. There are also many events outside of the festival, including the largest afterparties at the Detroit Masonic Temple and another popular party at The Old Miami with a surprise line-up. Inter dimensional Transmissions also throws No Way Back yearly with a heavy rotation of resident/international artist.

== Later generations ==
In the 2000s a new generation of producers associated with Detroit, among them Matthew Dear, Seth Troxler, Magda, Shaun Reeves, Ryan Crosson, Ryan Elliott, Lee Curtiss and Kyle Hall, became prominent internationally. Many of them moved to Berlin, where they helped shape that city's minimal techno scene. Richie Hawtin's parties at Detroit's City Club were an important meeting point for this generation.

== Politics ==
The first wave of Detroit techno differed from the Chicago house movement, with the former originating in Detroit's suburban Black middle class community. Teenagers of families that had prospered as a result of Detroit's automotive industry were removed from the kind of Black poverty found in urban parts of Detroit, Chicago, and New York. This resulted in tensions in club spaces frequented by ghetto gangstas or ruffians where signs stating "No Jits" were common. Suburban middle class Black youths were also attracted to Europhile culture, something that was criticized for not being authentically Black. Schaub's analysis of Underground Resistance valued "speaking out of the perspective of the hood than about providing new visions of identity formation for people in the hood"

Identity politics in Detroit techno is focused mostly on race relations. Throughout the creation of techno there was a constant and strong "progressive desire to move beyond essentialized Blackness". Even though the classist nature of techno avoided the artists and producers to separate themselves from the urban poor, especially in the first wave, it helped them make metropolitan spaces the subject of their own vision of different, alternative societies. These alternate societies aimed at moving beyond the concepts of race and ethnicity and blend all of them together. The early producers of Detroit techno state in multiple different occasions that the goal was to make techno just about music and not about race. As Juan Atkins said, "I hate that things have to be separated and dissected [by race] ... to me it shouldn't be white or Black music, it should be just music"

== Notable Detroit area record labels ==
- 430 West Records
- Detroit Techno Militia
- Axis Records
- Fragile
- Metroplex
- Minus Records
- Planet E Communications
- Plus 8
- Transmat
- Underground Resistance

== See also ==
- Detroit Electronic Music Festival (DEMF)
- Music of Detroit, Michigan

== Bibliography ==
- Brewster, B.; Broughton, F. (2006). Last Night a DJ Saved My Life: The History of the Disc Jockey. Avalon Travel Publishing. ISBN 978-0802136886.
- Butler, M. J. (2006). Unlocking the Groove: Rhythm, Meter, and Musical Design in Electronic Dance Music. Indiana University Press. ISBN 978-0253218049.
- Cosgrove, S. (May 1988). "Seventh City Techno". The Face. No. 97. p. 88. ISSN 0263-1210.
- Cosgrove, S. (1988). Techno! The New Dance Sound of Detroit (Media notes). 10 Records. LP: DIXG 75; CD: DIXCD 75. Archived from the original on 4 May 2008.
- Eshun, Kodwo (1998). More Brilliant Than the Sun: Adventures in Sonic Fiction. Quartet Books. ISBN 978-0704380257.
- Nelson, A.; Tu, L. T. N.; Headlam Hines, A., eds. (2001). TechniColor: Race, Technology and Everyday Life. New York University Press. ISBN 978-0814736043.
- Reynolds, S. (1998). Energy Flash: a Journey Through Rave Music and Dance Culture. Pan Macmillan. ISBN 978-0330350563.
- Reynolds, S. (1999). Generation Ecstasy: Into the World of Techno and Rave Culture. New York: Routledge. ISBN 978-0415923736. (Note: Generation Ecstasy is based on Energy Flash, but is a unique edition significantly rewritten for the North American market. Its copyright date is 1998 but it was first published July 1999.)
- Rietveld, H. C. (1998). This is Our House: House Music, Cultural Spaces and Technologies. Aldershot: Ashgate. ISBN 978-1857422429.
- Sicko, D. (1999). Techno Rebels: The Renegades of Electronic Funk. Billboard Books. ISBN 978-0823084289.
- Sicko, D. (2010). Techno Rebels: The Renegades of Electronic Funk (2nd ed.). Wayne State University Press. ISBN 978-0814334386.
