= Minus (record label) =

German record label

M-nus
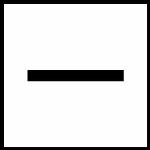
- Founded: 1998
- Founder: Richie Hawtin
- Genre: Minimal techno, microhouse
- Country of origin: Germany; Canada
- Location: Berlin; Windsor
- Official website: www.m-nus.com

Minus or M-nus is a recording label based in Berlin, Germany and Windsor, Canada. It was created in 1998 by Richie Hawtin when Plus 8, a label previously created by Hawtin, was put on hold. By 2005, M-nus was releasing two to three CDs and 12 to 14 records per year.

As Hawtin said of the scaling down to a smaller label, "You learn better who you are, what you are, and how to better present that and present it creatively. With Minus, we wanted to slow it down and try new things…" In 2011, Hawtin's music technology company Liine released Remiix Minus, a remix-app for iOS which enables fans to recombine loops and samples from Minus artists.

== Label roster ==
- Actual Jakshun
- Manclossi Deboroner
- Algoritmo, also known as Plans Ospina
- Asher Perkins
- Barem
- Berg Nixon, also known as Ryan Crosson
- Click Box
- DJ Minx
- Fabrizio Maurizi
- Gaiser
- Gavin Lynch, also known as Matador
- Hobo
- I. A. Bericochea
- Joop Junior
- JPLS
- Justin James
- Loco Dice
- Marco Carola
- Mathew Jonson
- Matthew Dear (also known as Audion and False)
- Niederflur
- Paco Osuna
- Richie Hawtin, also recording as Plastikman
- Theorem (also known as Dale Lawrence)
- Thomas Brinkman
- Tractile - (Joel Boychuk and Adam Young)
- Whyt Noyz - also known as David Sidley

== See also ==
- List of record labels
- List of electronic music record labels
