= Minimal techno =

Minimalist subgenre of techno

- Stylistic origins: Detroit techno; acid house; minimalism; ambient; electro
- Cultural origins: Early 1990s, Detroit (US) and Osaka (Japan)

Fusion genres
- Microhouse; tech house; progressive house

Minimal techno is a subgenre of techno music. It is characterized by a stripped-down aesthetic that exploits the use of repetition and understated development. Minimal techno is thought to have been developed in the early 1990s by Detroit-based producers Robert Hood and Daniel Bell.

By the early 2000s the term "minimal" generally described a style of techno that was popularized in Germany by labels such as Kompakt, Perlon, and Richie Hawtin's M-nus, among others.

== Origins ==
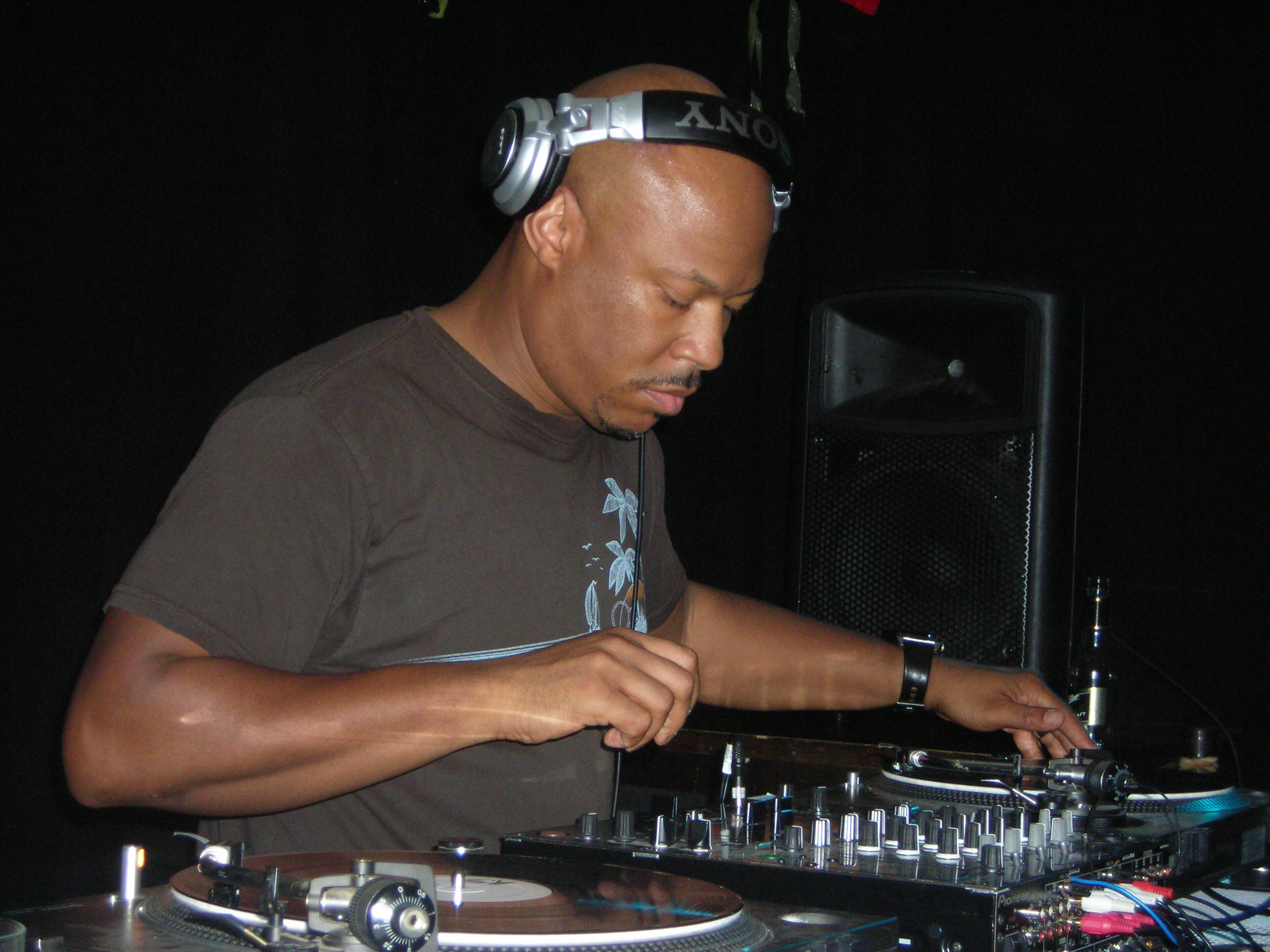
Robert Hood DJing in 2009

The sound of minimal techno was anticipated in the 1981 album Divin by Japanese artist Tolerance, the pseudonym of dental student Junko Tange. Her album was published by Osaka's Vanity Records, but was obscure until its rediscovery in the early 21st century.

Minimal techno emerged as a genre in the early 1990s. The development of the style is often attributed to a so-called "second wave" of American producers associated with Detroit techno. According to Derrick May, "while the first-wave artists were enjoying their early global success, techno also inspired many up-and-coming DJs and bedroom producers in Detroit". This younger generation included producers such as Richie Hawtin, Daniel Bell, Robert Hood, Jeff Mills, Carl Craig, Kenny Larkin, and Mike Banks. The work of several of these artists evolved to become focused on minimalism.

Robert Hood describes the situation in the early 1990s as one where techno had become too "ravey", with increasing tempos leading to the emergence of gabber. Such trends saw the demise of the soul-infused techno that typified the original Detroit sound. Robert Hood has noted that he and Daniel Bell both realized something was missing from techno in the post-rave era, and saw that an important feature of the original techno sound had been lost. Hood states that "it sounded great from a production standpoint, but there was a 'jack' element in the old structure. People would complain that there's no funk, no feeling in techno anymore, and the easy escape is to put a vocalist and some piano on top to fill the emotional gap. I thought it was time for a return to the original underground."

The minimal techno sound that emerged at this time has been defined by Robert Hood as "a basic stripped down, raw sound. Just drums, basslines and funky grooves and only what's essential. Only what is essential to make people move. I started to look at it as a science, the art of making people move their butts, speaking to their heart, mind and soul. It's a heart-felt rhythmic techno sound." Daniel Bell has commented that he had a dislike for minimalism in the artistic sense of the word, finding it too "arty".

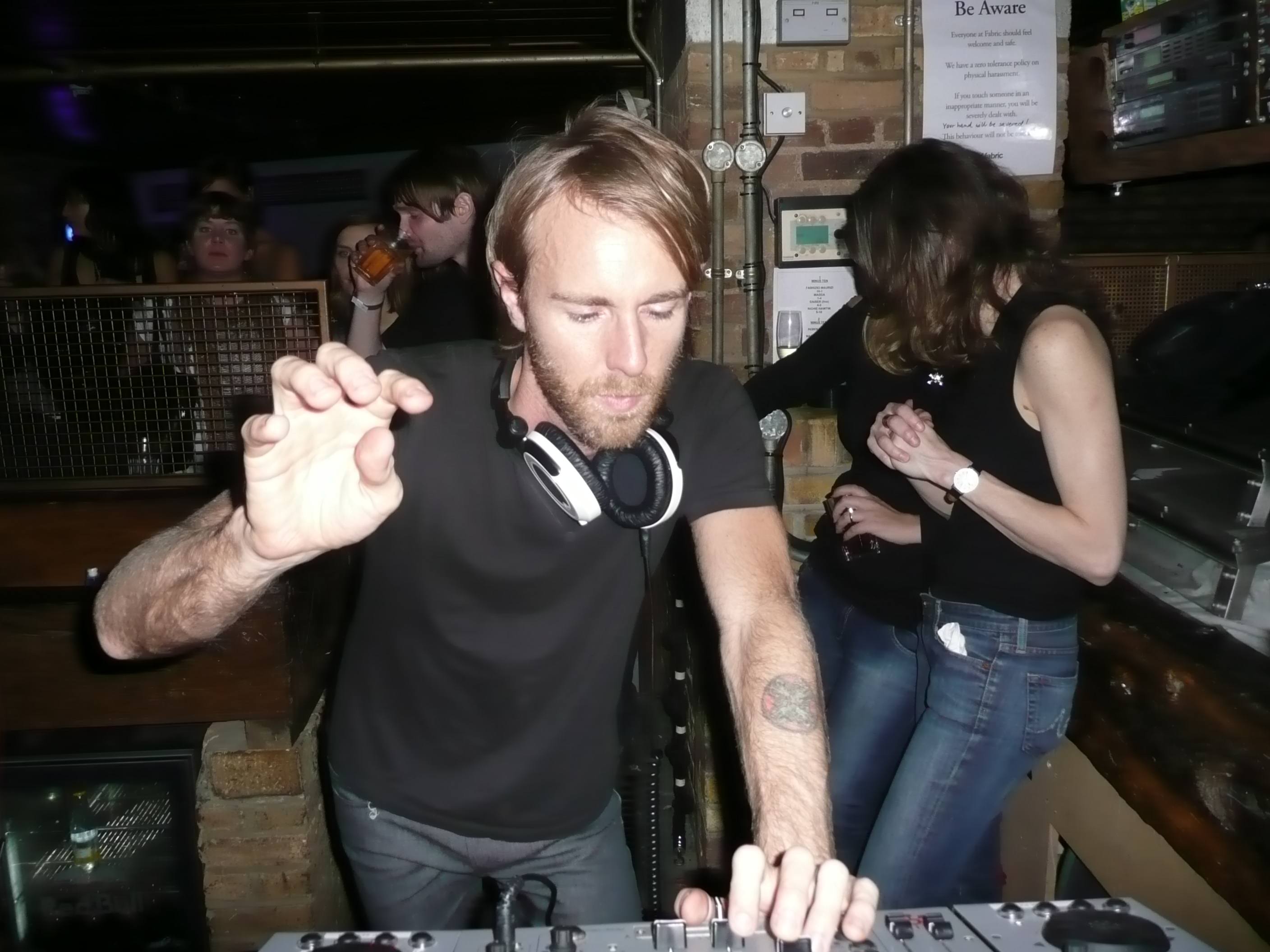
Richie Hawtin DJing at Fabric

In Audio Culture: Readings in Modern Music (2004), music journalist Philip Sherburne states that, like most contemporary electronic dance music, minimal techno has its roots in the landmark works of pioneers such as Kraftwerk and Detroit techno's Derrick May and Juan Atkins. Minimal techno focuses on "rhythm and repetition instead of melody and linear progression", much like classical minimalist music and the polyrhythmic African musical tradition that helped to inspire it. By 1994, according to Sherburne, the term "minimal" was in use to describe "any stripped-down, Acidic derivative of classic Detroit style".

Los Angeles-based writer Daniel Chamberlin attributes the origin of minimal techno to the German producers Basic Channel. Chamberlin draws parallels between the productions by Richie Hawtin, Wolfgang Voigt, and Surgeon with phase music techniques used by American minimalist composer Steve Reich. Chamberlin also sees the use of sine tone drones by minimalist composer La Monte Young and the repetitive patterns of "In C" by minimalist composer Terry Riley as other influences. Sherburne has suggested that the noted similarities between minimal forms of dance music and American minimalism could easily be accidental. He also notes that much of the music technology used in electronic dance music was traditionally designed to suit loop-based compositional methods, which may explain why certain stylistic features of minimal techno sound similar to those in works by Reich that employ loops and pattern-phasing techniques.

== Style ==
Construct Infinity
Minimal techno track by André Michelle with a massification style

Philip Sherburne proposes that minimal techno uses two specific stylistic approaches: skeletalism and massification. According to Sherburne, in skeletal minimal techno, only the core elements are included with embellishments used only for the sake of variation within the song. In contrast, massification is a style of minimalism in which many sounds are layered over time, but with little variation in sonic elements. Today the influence of minimal styles of house music and techno is not only to be found in club music, but is becoming increasingly heard in popular music. Regardless of the style, he writes, "minimal Techno corkscrews into the very heart of repetition so cerebrally as to often inspire descriptions like 'spartan', 'clinical', 'mathematical', and 'scientific'".

The average tempo of a minimal techno track is between 125 and 130 beats per minute. Richie Hawtin suggests 128 bpm as the perfect tempo. In the early minimal techno scene, most tracks were constructed around a Roland TR-808 or Roland TR-909 drum machine. Both are still often used on today's minimal techno tracks. In contrast to minimal house, minimal techno is less afrocentric and focuses more on middle frequencies rather than deep basses.

== Development ==
Many projects in other locations, such as those of Regis in the UK, Basic Channel in Berlin and Mika Vainio in Finland, have also made significant contributions to minimal techno.

The genre has been heavily influenced by the microhouse genre, to the point of merging with it. It has also fragmented into a great number of difficult to categorize subgenres, equally claimed by the minimal techno and microhouse tags.

Minimal techno has found mainstream club popularity since 2004 in such places as Romania, Germany, Portugal, Japan, France, Belgium, South Africa, The Netherlands, Spain, Sri Lanka, Italy, Ireland and the UK, with DJs from a wide variety of genres incorporating differing elements of its tones. In 2003, minimal techno received widespread commercial attention when Kylie Minogue employed the sound on her number-one hit "Slow", while in years to come the work of M.A.N.D.Y. and Booka Shade would be sampled by will.i.am.

Record labels specializing in minimal techno are [a:rpia:r], Traum Schallplatten, BPitch Control, Cocoon Recordings, Kompakt, Perlon, Clink, Plus 8, and Sähkö Recordings, among others.

== See also ==
- Microhouse
- Electronic music
