= Novamute Records =

Electronic dance music label

NovaMute Records is the electronic dance music subsidiary of Mute Records, which was started in 1992. The label's staff included Mick Paterson (promotions), Pepe Jansz (A&R), and producer Seth Hodder, and it was originally set up to give UK releases to white label 12-inch singles and imports. In the United States, it was distributed by Tommy Boy Records while the Mute parent label was distributed by Elektra Records.

In the beginning, the label licensed records and music from small labels such as Berlin-based Tresor and Canadian label Plus 8. It expanded its remit to include new work from artists such as Richie Hawtin and Luke Slater.

NovaMute win the Best Label award at the Music und Maschine Awards in Germany in July 2002.

In 2017, Daniel Miller relaunched the label with releases from Nicolas Bougaïeff and Terence Fixmer.

== Artists ==
- 3 Phase
- ANNA
- Acid Casuals
- Aftrax
- Beyer and Lenk
- Charlotte de Witte
- Collabs 3000
- Compufonic
- Cristian Vogel
- Earnest Honest
- Emmanuel Top
- Hans Weekhout
- Indika
- JakoJako
- Juno Reactor
- Karl Axel Bissler
- Luke Slater
- Meloboy
- Miss Kittin
- Needledust
- Nicolas Bougaïeff
- Phil Kieran
- Plastikman
- Richie Hawtin
- Si Begg
- S.I. Futures
- Soul Center
- Space DJz
- Speedy J
- Spirit Feel
- Terence Fixmer
- Tim Baker
- Tim Wright
- Totalis
- T.Raumschmiere
- Umek
- Unity 3
- Woody McBride

== See also ==
- Lists of record labels
