= Plus 8 =

Influential techno record label

Plus 8 (also spelled as Plus8) is a Canadian techno record label founded by Richie Hawtin and John Acquaviva in 1990 that's based in Windsor, Ontario. Along with Underground Resistance and Planet E, Plus 8 was one of the early producers of Detroit techno's 'Second Wave' music at the start of the 1990s.

== History ==
The label's name referred to the fact that on most turntables, +8% is the maximum amount by which one can increase the speed of playback. Initial releases were a series of increasingly faster industrial hardcore recordings by the pair themselves and their friends, using aliases such as States of Mind and Cybersonik, along with other Detroit-based musicians such as Kenny Larkin.

The label began to retreat from hard and fast tempo after the release of Circuit Breaker's "Overkill/Frenz-E" and Cybersonik's "Thrash" in 1992. Hawtin and Aquaviva lost interest in the drug-fueled dynamic and rave culture that was driving hardcore techno. In 1992, after observing a crowd in a Rotterdam club shouting an antisemitic football chant over Plus 8's song, Cybersonik's "Thrash", Hawtin and Aquaviva decided to change musical direction by slowing down the tempo and bringing funk and soul back into their music.

Plus 8 releases include early 12-inch singles from Speedy J, and from Richie Hawtin's many pseudonyms including F.U.S.E. and Plastikman. By 1996, Plus 8 had also released a number of dance compilation albums. The label was suspended in 1997, as Acquaviva concentrated on DJing and Hawtin on his new label, M nus, but releases (and re-releases of early material often licensed to other labels) have appeared from time to time, notably 2000's Plus 8 Classics triple 12-inch vinyl and CD retrospective. In 2015, Richie Hawtin released From My Mind to Yours.

== See also ==
- List of record labels
- List of electronic music record labels
