= Zimoun =

Zimoun (born 1977) is a Swiss artist who lives and works in Bern, Switzerland. As self-taught artist, he is most known for his sound sculptures, sound architectures and installation art that combine raw, industrial materials such as cardboard boxes, plastic bags, or old furniture, with mechanical elements such as dc-motors, wires, microphones, speakers and ventilators.

== Life and work ==
Although he was never formally trained in the arts, Zimoun has received numerous prizes for his work and has exhibited internationally. "Since a little kid I have been interested in exploring sound, playing instruments and creating compositions in addition to visual arts such as paintings, cartoons, photographs and so on", Zimoun explains in an interview, "from a very early age I was fascinated and somehow obsessed by being active in all these fields; sound, music and visually realized projects. Now, through my sound sculptures and installations many of these interests are coming together." Zimoun also mentioned composer and artist John Cage whose work and thoughts he often studied during his younger days. Through the use of industrial objects and found materials, Zimoun's work reconsiders the place technology holds in daily life, conjuring nostalgia for obsolete devices. His sculptures reference the chaos of the modern day, while retaining the order of minimalism. His oeuvre includes his celebrated architectural interventions and sound sculptures, as well as a variety of audio works that expand on the traditions of lowercase music, sound art, and minimal techno. Zimoun is best known for his installative, generally site-specific, immersive works. He employs mechanical principles of rotation and oscillation to put materials into motion and thus produce sounds. For this he principally uses simple materials from everyday life and industrial usage, such as cardboard, DC motors, cables, welding wire, wooden spars or ventilators. For his works Zimoun develops small apparatuses which, despite their fundamental simplicity, generate a tonal and visual complexity once activated – particularly when a large number of such mechanical contraptions, generally hundreds of them, are united and orchestrated in installations and sculptures. Zimoun creates three-dimensional sonic spaces the visitor can actively explore.

=== Architectural interventions and sound sculptures ===
Zimoun's sound sculptures and architectural interventions combine visual, sonic, and spatial elements. He's using simple mechanical systems to transform and activate the space. "By arranging industrially produced parts according to seemingly simple rules, he creates closed systems that develop their own behavior and rules similarly to artificial creatures", as Node10 describes his work in the exhibition abstrakt Abstrakt (2010). "Once running, they are left to themselves and go through an indeterminable process of (de)generation. These quasi autonomous creatures exist in an absolutely synthetic sphere of lifeless matter. However, within the precise, determinist systems creative categories suddenly reappear, such as deviation, refusal and transcience out of which complex patterns of behavior evolve." Or, as bitforms gallery explains, "Zimoun builds architecturally-minded platforms of sound to explore mechanical rhythm and flow in prepared systems. In an obsessive display of simple and functional materials, these works articulate a tension between the orderly patterns of Modernism and the chaotic forces of life". According to creative director of Holo magazine Alexander Scholz, "Visually, the Swiss artist Zimoun's kinetic sculptures are architectural manifestations of the machine age: hundreds of simple, meticulously assembled, and methodically distributed contraptions whir away in concert. Enter these pristine formations and their mechanical pulse reveals an unlikely pattern. Trickling rain, rustling leaves, babbling brooks—the lush soundscapes that swell within evoke the majesty of nature." In the Sikart Lexicon it is said, "Zimoun's works continually embrace oppositional positions, such as the principles of order and chaos. Works may be arranged in a geometrical pattern or ordered and installed according to a system, yet they behave chaotically and act – within a carefully prepared framework of possibilities – in an uncontrolled manner as soon as they are mechanically activated. As if in a clinical study, the pattern and the systematic approach enable an overview, so that the chaos generated by the mechanical process can be better analyzed. Mass and individuality also belong among these oppositional positions. The artist often employs a large number of identical elements, but each element develops its own individuality and unique nature through the dynamic interplay of mechanism, rotation and material. The mechanical elements, prepared by hand in the studio, which have a consistently reduced, minimalistic form, function and aesthetic, possess only apparent precision, because the manual production creates divergence from the ideal treatment of the material, allowing imprecisions that emphasize the emerging individual behavior of the materials, enable it or indeed provoke it."

Regarding often used elements of chance in his work, Zimoun explains in an interview (2011), "I'm interested in a mix of living structures on the one hand, and control about decisions and details on the other. A combination of structures continuously generating or evolving by chance, chain reactions or other generative systems, and a specifically delimited and contained space in which these events are allowed to happen. The compositional intentions are manifesting themselves through my deliberate containment and cautious monitoring. So I'm not using chance to discover unexpected results, but to elevate the works to a higher level of vitality."

Featured in the group show, Nostalgia Machines (2011) at David Winton Bell Gallery, 150 prepared dc-motors, filler wire 1.0 mm. (2011), consists of small motors hanging at the ends of wires attached to the wall, causing the motors to bang against the wall and, according to Cate McQuaid of the Boston Globe, make the sound of a "drenching rainstorm - a trigger for associations of threat and cozy shelter." His work also brings to mind the constant hum of machines and electronics in modern life. By "re-contextualiz[ing] material as much it does sound", Zimoun's work shifts the viewers' relationship with technology and reminds them of the motors and materials that move everyday life. "Every attempt to describe Zimoun's work includes comparisons to nature, to urban landscapes, and to music, to minimalism, and to technology." As Maya Allison, curator of Zimoun's solo exhibition at NYUAD Gallery in Abu Dhabi (2019) and group exhibition Nostalgia Machines (2011) at David Winton Bell Gallery, (2011) explains, "the meeting between materials, meticulously arranged in a large room, not only intervenes spatially, through modular and repetitive visuality, it also confronts us with the magnificence and evocative power of sound." According to artist and co-curator Moníca Bate of Zimoun's exhibition at the Contemporary Art Museum MAC in Santiago de Chile (2016), "the sound experience that Zimoun delivers through his installations enables the unhurried viewer to sharpen their listening, discovering those differences within the sonic body that at first seems just a single mass." Or as Alessandra Burroto, curator of Zimoun's large solo exhibition at the Contemporary Art Museum MAC in Santiago de Chile (2019) explains, "through Zimoun's work, we can find some clear signals of sound's constructive purpose. His constructions, or "micro-worlds", behave as a never-ending flux of sound, and these become eloquent and corporeal presences. The artist's interest lies in creating sounds by very specific means: his operation is rooted in creating sound from simple technological devices, serial and modular." Ulf Kallscheidt, who worked at Studio Zimoun during several years and who is quoted at Sikart Lexicon explains, "when naming his works Zimoun consistently follows the principle of listing the materials used one after another. With this he brings materials to the fore; in addition, the titles signal the 'prepared' mechanism, indicating the connection to intentionally tonally manipulated musical instruments. His works are often defined using the term of sound architectures, based on the principles of Minimal Music, to which he brings a visual aspect while insisting on a simple, reduced design without embellishment or additional colour. Although Zimoun conceives of his installations as compositions in a musical sense, he does not actively intervene in the development of their sound. He does not direct the mechanical systems implemented either in an analogue manner or digitally, via a microcontroller or a computer, instead merely activating them by turning on or off their electricity supply. He sees the moment of activation and the dynamic of the materials themselves as a sculptural and performative approach and names the principle behind these works 'primitive complexity'." In his 2012 solo show in NYC at bitforms gallery, Volume, Zimoun built an almost floor-to-ceiling room composed of cardboard boxes. The piece, 294 prepared dc-motors, cork balls, cardboard boxes 41x41x41cm (2012), just as the title suggests, is composed of card board boxes, each with a small motor attached to it, from which hangs a wire with a cork ball on the end. The motors cause the balls to continuously bounce against the boxes. As Hannah Daly of Art Slant notes, "the effect is initially so ambient, so close to the near constant aural din we intake at every moment, you could miss it." As The Ringling Museum of Art explains, Zimoun's sculptures create "unique sensory experiences redefining traditional notions of sculpture and sonic performance." As stated by Guido Comis, who curated the exhibition of Zimoun at LAC Art Museum in Lugano (2015) and another exhibition at the Museo d'Arte Lugano (2014), "Zimoun's creations are characterized by very simple moving elements repeated in series: cardboard boxes gently rustling against one another or serving as drumming surfaces for swirling shafts; beams of wood occupying the whole surface of the exhibition space and rhythmically hitting the floor; plastic bags in countless numbers flickering in the air stream produced by electric fans. The works, therefore, have a twofold effect that is visual as well as acoustic." His work explores the nature in industrial materials, and the industrial in nature. He not only evokes, or mimics the sounds of nature through the use of archaic materials, but at times even combines elements of nature with equipment, as in 25 woodworms, wood, microphone, sound system (2009), which amplified the sound of live woodworms. "In the style of the endlessly repeating metronome (the direct nature of Zimoun's pieces makes "real time" the main protagonist of his work) that is simultaneously playful and stressful, Zimoun plays with various materials that stand out for their simplicity (...) These ordinary, functional elements are drawn from daily life, often recycled, and generally of industrial origin. The properties of each of them — resistance, volatility, elasticity, friction, resonance — serve as pretexts for every new form of experimentation. The piece 600 Prepared DC-Motors, 58 kg wood, 2017 (in Zimoun's work, titles are never anything but a strict description of the materials used) comprises 600 mechanically activated wooden rods and is part of the discourse devoted to passing time. Meanwhile, 30,000 Plastic Bags, 16 Ventilators, 2010 employs literally 30,000 clear plastic bags adhered to the walls of a room that vibrates with a sparkling rustle thanks to a stream of air jointly propelled by 16 fans", according to Swiss art historian Karine Tissot, who curated Zimoun's exhibition at Kunsthalle Palazzo in Liesthal, Switzerland.

=== Audio work ===
In addition to his installative compositions, Zimoun also develops purely acoustic works. Although the two genres – visual, un-controlled, accidental compositions and musical compositions for sound recording and performance that are laboriously constructed in the studio – may seem quite different at first, both emerge from the artist's interest in creating spaces and acoustic states which are composed of microscopically small sounds and noises. Largely related to his sound sculptures are Zimoun's audio works, often engineered with a similar variety of found industrial and natural materials. Zimoun explains that his compositions "create static sound architectures and spaces, to enter and explore acoustically like a building." Since 2006 most of his compositions and performances are based on ambisonics techniques using multi channel technology. Through the implementation of multiple loudspeakers, listeners are placed within a three-dimensional sonic architecture which cannot be discovered visually, but only acoustically. Zimoun also works on recordings with other artists from music and the visual arts.

In 2003 Zimoun and Marc Beekhuis, a Swiss graphic designer, formed the record label, Leerraum [ ], which provides a "platform for creative exchange among artists, designers, architects who use reductive principles in their work." Zimoun has also performed at contemporary music and art venues such as the List Art Center, Providence (2012), Mois Multi, Quebec (2011), Transmediale, Berlin (2009), Elektra, Montreal (2008), Sonic Acts, Amsterdam (2008), and ISEA Singapore (2008), among others. Various Contemporary Art Museums have Zimoun's work in their collection, such as the Museum of Contemporary Art Moca Busan, Korea; Haus der elektronischen Künste Basel, Switzerland; LAC Art Museum Lugano, Switzerland; The John and Mable Ringling Museum of Art Florida; the Museum of Contemporary Art MAC Santiago de Chile; Museum of Fine Arts, Thun, Switzerland; Borusan Contemporary Istanbul, Turkey; or the Museum of Contemporary Art Kunst (Zeug) Haus in Switzerland, among others.

== Exhibitions ==
Zimoun's work was a success at first in his hometown of Bern, where Don Li, a Swiss composer and musician, showed it in his art space TONUS-MUSIC Labor several times (2000, 2001, 2002). Later on, as his notoriety has increased, Zimoun has gained international recognition, especially in Europe and the United States, later as well in North and South America and Asia. Most notably he's had solo shows at the Museum of Contemporary Art MAC Santiago de Chile (2019), Museum Collection Lambert, Avignon, France (2019), Le Centquatre in Paris, France (2017), NYUAD Art Gallery Abu Dhabi (2019), Museum of Contemporary Art Busan, Republic of Korea (2018), Museum Art.Plus, Donaueschingen, Germany (2018), Telefónica Museum Lima, Peru (2018), Rå Hal, European Capital of Culture, Aarhus, Denmark (2017), Museum of Fine Arts MBAL Le Locle, Switzerland (2016), Calgary Contemporary, Calgary, Canada (2016), Mumbai City Museum, India (2016), Knockdown Center NYC, New York, USA (2015), Museum of Fine Arts, Lugano, Switzerland (2014), at Galerie Denise René, Paris, France (2012), bitforms gallery, NY (2012), Museu da Imagem e do Som, São Paulo, Brasil (2012), The John and Mable Ringling Museum of Art, FL (2011), Contemporary Art Museum MNAC, Bucharest, Romania (2011), and the Art Museum Liechtenstein, Liechtenstein (2010). He's also been included in group shows at the Muxin Art Museum, Wuzhen, China (2019), Taipei Fine Arts Museum, Taipei, Taiwan (2016), Contemporary Art Museum MAC, Santiago de Chile (2016), Museum of Fine Arts, Thun, Switzerland (2016), BIAN Biennale, Montreal, Canada (2016), National Art Museum of China, Beijing, China (2014), 21_21 Design Sight Museum, Tokyo, Japan (2015), Nam June Paik Art Center, Seoul, Republic Korea (2012), Kuandu Museum of Fine Arts, Taipei, Taiwan (2012), Vasarely' Fondation, Aix en Provence, France (2010), Ars Electronica, Linz, Austria (2010), and Kunsthalle Bern, Switzerland (2008), among many others.

His solo show at the Ringling Museum of Art (2011) was his first solo museum exhibition in the United States. Curated by Matthew McLendon, Zimoun: Sculpting Sound included five large installations spanning five of the museum's rooms.

Exhibitions (selection):

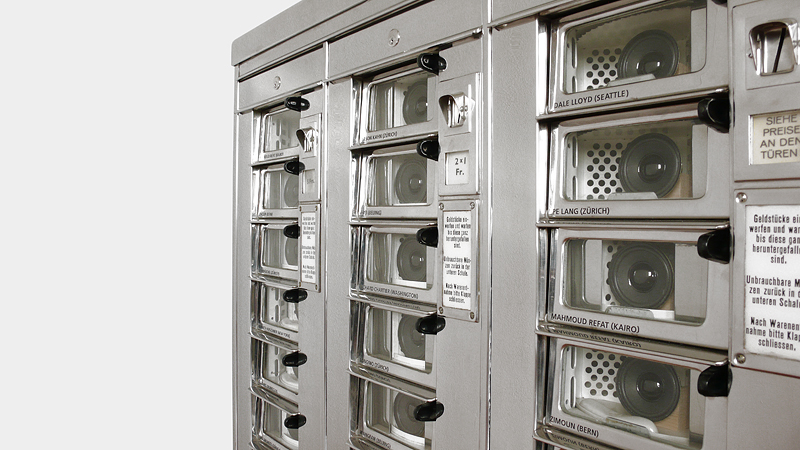
24 sound contributions in an automat – Zimoun 2005, Exhibition view: Kunstmuseum Bern, Schweiz

- Stadtgalerie, Saarbrücken, Germany, 2020
- Museum of Contemporary Art MAC, Santiago, Chile, 2019
- Muxin Art Museum, Wuzhen, China, 2019
- Museum Collection Lambert, Avignon, France, 2019.
- NYUAD Arts Gallery, Abu Dhabi, 2019.
- Telefónica, Lima, Peru, 2018
- Museum Art.Plus, Donaueschingen, Germany, 2018.
- Museum of Contemporary Art Busan, Republic of Korea, 2018.
- Museum of Contemporary Art Kunst(Zeug)Haus, Rapperswil, Switzerland, 2017.
- Le Centquatre, Paris, France, 2017.
- European Capital of Culture, Rå Hal, Aarhus, Denmark, 2017.
- Museum of Contemporary Art MAC, Santiago, Chile, 2016.
- Contemporary Calgary, Calgary, Canada, 2016
- Polytechnic Museum, Moscow, Russia, 2016.
- Fine Arts Museum, Taipei, Taiwan, 2016.
- Borusan Contemporary, Istanbul, Turkey, 2015.
- Knockdown Center, New York City, USA, 2015.
- 21_21 Design Sight Museum, Tokyo, Japaqn, 2015.
- Museum of Fine Arts Lugano, Lugano, Switzerland, 2015.
- National Art Museum of China, Beijing, China, 2014.
- Geumcheon Art Factory, Seoul, Korea, 2014.
- Kunstverein Mannheim, Mannheim, Germany, 2014.
- MAC international, Belfast, United Kingdom, 2014.
- Beall Center, Los Angeles, USA, 2014
- Backlit Gallery, Nottingham, United Kingdom, 2013.
- Nowy Teatr, Warszaw, Poland, 2013.
- Tower's Art Gallery, Brussels, Belgium, 2013.
- Auditorium Arte, Rome, Italy, 2013.
- Musée des Beaux-Arts, Rennes, France, 2013.
- Joel and Lila Harnett Museum of Art, Richmond, USA, 2013.
- Galerie Denise René, Paris, France, 2012.
- Nam June Paik Art Center, Seoul, Republic Korea, 2012.
- Museu da Imagem e do Som, São Paulo, Brasil, 2012.
- Kuandu Museum of Fine Arts, Taipei, Taiwan, 2012.
- ART Basel, Switzerland, 2011 + 2012.
- bitforms gallery, New York, USA, 2009 + 2012 + 2015.
- CAN, Centre d'Art Neuchatel, Neuchatel, Switzerland, 2012.
- Seoul Museum of Art, Seoul, Republic Korea, 2012.
- Le Centrequatre, Paris, France, 2012-2013
- BIAN Biennale, Oboro, Montreal, Canada, 2012.
- Deaf Biennale, Rotterdam, The Netherlands, 2012.
- Meta.Morf Biennale, Trondheim, Norway, 2012.
- The John and Mable Ringling Museum of Art, Sarasota FL, USA, 2011.
- Contemporary Art Museum MNAC, Bucharest, Romania, 2011.
- List Art Center, David Winton Bell Gallery, Providence, USA, 2011.
- Kunsthalle Palazzo, Liestal, Switzerland, 2011.
- Gray Area Foundation for the Arts, Swissnex, San Francisco, USA, 2011.
- Lydgalleriet, Bergen, Norway, 2011.
- Kunsthalle Luzern, Switzerland, 2011.
- Kunstmuseum Liechtenstein, Schichtwechsel, Liechtenstein, 2010.
- Vooruit Arts Center, Gent, Belgium, 2010.
- La Rada, Locarno, Switzerland, 2010.
- Kunstraum Kreuzlingen, Switzerland, 2010.
- Kunstmuseum, Bern, Switzerland, 2005 + 2009.
- Centre pour l'image contemporaine, Geneva, Switzerland, 2008.
- Kunsthalle, Bern, Switzerland, 2004, 2006 + 2008.
- DDM Gallery, Shanghai, China, 2004.
- Tonus Labor, Bern, 2002, 2003 + 2004.
- Photoforum Centre Pasquart, Biel/Bienne, Switzerland, 2002, 2003 + 2004.

== Awards ==
- 2010 Prix Ars Electronica, Digital Music & Sound Art, Honorary Mention
- 2009 Aeschlimann Corti Award, First Prize
- 2008 Sitemapping/Mediaprojects award, Budesamit für Kultur (BAK)
- 2007 New York Residency, Bern Canton, Cultural Department
- 2006 Kiefer Hablitzel Preis, Swiss Art Awards
- 2005 Aeschlimann Corti Award, Förderpreis
- 2004 Residency in Beijing, China
- 2000 Mention Swiss Youth Photo Award

== Discography ==
- Zimoun «Room 1-3» [leerraum.ch] (stereo compositions, 2018)
- Zimoun «Borrowed Sounds III» [leerraum.ch] (stereo mixdowns, 2018)
- Mise en Scene + Zimoun «28.26» [leerraum.ch] (5.1 composition, 2018)
- Andy Graydon + Zimoun «16.06» [leerraum.ch] (5.1 composition, 2018)
- Oren Ambarchi + Zimoun «18.58» [leerraum.ch] (5.1 composition, 2016).
- Zimoun «28.34» [leerraum.ch] (5.1 composition, 2016)
- Richard Garet + Zimoun «21.21» [leerraum.ch] (5.1 multi channel composition, 2015).
- Zimoun «Room 5.52» [Cyland Audio Archive] (stereo composition, 2015).
- Zimoun «Borrowed Sounds II» [leerraum.ch] (stereo mixdowns, 2015).
- Zimoun «feat. Helena Gough» [leerraum.ch] (5.1 multi channel DVD, 2010).
- Zimoun «Borrowed Sounds I» [leerraum.ch] (stereo mixdowns), 2008).
- Mahmoud Refat, Pe Lang + Zimoun «Statics III» [leerraum.ch] (4.1 multi channel DVD, 2008).
- Asher + Zimoun «Untitled Movement» [leerraum.ch] (5.1 multi channel DVD, 2008).
- Fourm + Zimoun «Primary Structures» [leerraum.ch] (5.1 multi channel DVD, 2008).
- Zimoun feat. Mik Keusen «Prepared I» [leerraum.ch] (cd, 2007).
- Kenneth Kirschner + Zimoun «July 29, 2004 (4.1)» (4.1 multi channel DVD, 2007).
- Leerraum [ ] «Sound Contributions I» [leerraum.ch] (5.1 multi channel DVD, 2007).
- Zimoun «Kabel 0.1/0.2» [leerraum.ch] (cd, 2006).
- Mahmoud Refat, Pe Lang + Zimoun «Statics II» [leerraum.ch] (cd, 2006).
- Mahmoud Refat + Zimoun «Statics I» [leerraum.ch] (cd, 2006).
- Fm3 + Zimoun «live 19.06.2004» [leerraum.ch] (cd, 2005).
- Zimoun «Nå» [tonus-music-records.com] (cd, 2004).
- Zimoun «Flachland» [leerraum.ch] (cd, 2003).
- Zimoun «Viskos» [leerraum.ch] (cd, 2003).
- Zimoun «Drums» [leerraum.ch] (cd, 2003).
- Zimoun «Momental» [ammoniac-music records] (cd, 2002).

== Resources ==
- Zimoun's Vimeo Page (video archive)
- Images of Zimoun's Work
- Detailed CV of Zimoun
- Audio Works of Zimoun on Discogs
- Zimoun Artist Page, bitforms gallery
- Zimoun Video Page, bitforms gallery
- Klanten, S. Ehmann, V. Hanschke (ed.), A Touch of Code: Interactive Installations and Experiences, (Berlin: Gestalten, 2011), pp. 42–43.
- Mancuso, Marco, "Sound Organisms in Evolution," Digimag, No. 61, February 2011, web.
- Poviña, Oscar Gomez, "Noise Structures," Vnfold Magazine, July 12, 2010.
- Rodda, Corey Rae, "Zimoun modern art exhibition opens at Ringling Museum of Art," New College of Florida student newspaper, October 23, 2011, web.
- Rife, Susan, "Sculpting Sound," Herald Tribune, October 14, 2011, web.
- "Zimoun". SIKART Lexicon on art in Switzerland.
