= Orchestrion (album) =

Studio album by Pat Metheny
- Released: January 26, 2010
- Recorded: October 2009
- Studio: MSR Studios, New York City
- Genre: Jazz
- Length: 52:04
- Label: Nonesuch
- Producer: Pat Metheny

Pat Metheny chronology
Quartet Live (2009)	Orchestrion (2010)	What's It All About (2011)

Professional ratings
Review scores
Source	Rating
AllMusic	4/5 stars
All About Jazz	4.5/5 stars
Tom Hull	B+

Orchestrion is a studio album by jazz guitarist Pat Metheny that was released by Nonesuch Records on January 26, 2010.

Metheny's orchestrionics were built by Eric Singer and the League of Electronic Musical Urban Robots, Ken Caulkins at Ragtime West, Mark Herbert, Cyril Lance, and Peterson Electro-Musical Products. The set includes pianos, marimba, vibraphone, orchestra bells, basses, GuitarBots, percussion, cymbals and drums, blown bottles and other custom-fabricated, acoustic, mechanical instruments.

== Track listing ==
All music is composed by Pat Metheny.

No.	Title	Length
1.	"Orchestrion"	15:48
2.	"Entry Point"	10:28
3.	"Expansion"	8:35
4.	"Soul Search"	9:19
5.	"Spirit of the Air"	7:45
Total length:		52:04

== Personnel ==
- Pat Metheny – guitar and orchestrionics

=== Technical personnel ===
- Pat Metheny – producer
- Steve Rodby – associate producer
- Robert Hurwitz – executive producer
- Joe Ferla – recording, mixing
- Mark Wilder – mastering at Battery Sound, NYC, USA
- Barbara De Wilde – artwork
- Henry Leutwyler – photography

== Score ==
In 2011 the complete score was published.

== Charts ==
Year	Chart	Position
2010	Billboard Top Jazz Albums	3
2010	Billboard 200	114
