= R. Luke DuBois =

American composer and artist

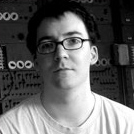
- R. Luke DuBois in front of the RCA Mark II Synthesizer, 2006.

Background information
- Born: R. Luke DuBois; 10 September 1975 (age 51); Morristown, New Jersey, United States
- Genres: Experimental, Contemporary classical, Improvised music, Electronica, Ambient, Computer Music
- Occupations: Composer, musician, producer, multi-instrumentalist, New Media artist
- Instruments: Analog synthesizer, laptop, bass guitar, electric guitar
- Years active: 1990s–present
- Labels: Caipirinha / Sire, Liquid Sky, Nonesuch, Cantaloupe Music, Cycling '74, Innova
- Formerly of: Freight Elevator Quartet
- Website: lukedubois.com

Roger Luke DuBois (born 10 September 1975) is an American composer, performer, conceptual new media artist, programmer, record producer and pedagogue based in New York City.

== Early life ==
DuBois was born in Morristown, New Jersey, United States, moving at age 11 to the UK, where he attended the American School in London, before moving to New York City in 1993 to attend Columbia University. DuBois holds a master's (1999) and a doctorate (2003) in music composition from Columbia (studying primarily with Fred Lerdahl and Jonathan Kramer), and worked as a staff researcher at Columbia's Computer Music Center until 2008.

== Academic career ==
DuBois has taught interactive music and video performance at a number of institutions, including Columbia, Princeton University, the School of Visual Arts, and the Integrated Design & Media, Music Technology and Interactive Telecommunications programs at New York University. In 2008 he began teaching as a full-time professor at the NYU Tandon School of Engineering, where he currently serves as co-director of the IDM program and chair of its parent department (Technology, Culture, & Society); his academic position consists of a triple appointment between the IDM Program, Music Technology, and ITP. As a graduate student at Columbia he was a contributor to Real-Time Cmix. Since 2000 he has worked for Cycling '74 on Max/MSP/Jitter.

== Collaborations ==
DuBois has collaborated with a wide range of artists and musicians, including Elliott Sharp, Paul D. Miller, Todd Reynolds, Toni Dove, Chris Mann, Michael Joaquin Grey, Matthew Ritchie, Eric Singer, Bora Yoon, and Leroy Jenkins. He was a founding member of the Freight Elevator Quartet, and has produced records for Bang on a Can composer Michael Gordon on the Nonesuch label. His music integrates real-time performer-computer interaction with algorithmic methodologies repurposed from other fields, most notably formal grammars such as L-systems. His research into issues of musical time revolves around a technique called time-lapse phonography, as used in his piece Billboard. His instrumental writing, like his artwork, is often based on techniques derived from stochastic music and data mining, using metaphors and information from cultural topics as source material in a postmodern style, as in the string quartet Hard Data, a six-movement sonification that, while its musical structure is based on the casualty stream of the Iraq War, borrows heavily from the instrumental writing of Stravinsky, Messiaen, Xenakis, and Crumb.

== Conceptual artist ==
As a conceptual artist, DuBois takes on various topics in American culture and places them under a computational microscope to raise issues relevant to information theory, perception of time, canonicity, and gaze. For example, his trio of pieces on gestalt media, Academy, Billboard, and Play, look at three iconic cultural "canons" in American popular culture (the Academy Awards, the Billboard Hot 100, and Playboy magazine's Playmate of the Month). His piece Hindsight is Always 20/20, based on a statistical analysis of presidential State of the Union addresses, uses computational means as a lens into the politics of political rhetoric. Fashionably Late for the Relationship, his feature-length collaboration with performance artist Lián Amaris, uses the radical time-compression of a 72-hour film of a performance to deconstruct romantic obsession. For his large-scale artwork A More Perfect Union, DuBois joined 21 different online dating sites and constructed a census of the United States based on an analysis of the profiles of 19 million single Americans; shown as a series of colored and relabeled maps, the work investigates the lexicon of American self-identity in the 21st century.

== Art and exhibitions ==
His work is represented by bitforms gallery in New York City, and has been exhibited worldwide, including at the 2007 Sundance Film Festival and the 2008 Democratic National Convention. In January 2014 R. Luke DuBois—Now opened at the Ringling Museum of Art. This first solo museum exhibition, organized by curator Matthew McLendon, surveyed DuBois's output over the previous decade, and included performance, video, public installation, and generative works. The exhibition went on to the Orange County Museum of Art the following year and the Bowdoin College Museum of Art in 2016. In December 2016 Hyperallergic named R. Luke DuBois—Now one of the top 15 exhibitions in the United States.

Before becoming a well-known Laptop musician, DuBois did most of his improvisation and performance on Buchla and Serge modular synthesizers.

== Awards and recognition ==
In 2013 DuBois was awarded an honorary Doctor of Humane Letters by Goucher College. He was named the inaugural artist for the Times Square Residency at the CrossRoads Program in 2015 and was a speaker for TED 2016. In 2018 the Cooper Hewitt, Smithsonian Design Museum commissioned DuBois and Zach Lieberman to represent the United States in the London Design Biennale. The projects developed for that exhibition, Face Values, received the jury medal for "most inspiring interpretation of the 2018 theme".

== Personal life ==
DuBois is the younger brother of photographer Doug DuBois.

== Notable works ==
- Billboard (2005)
- Play (2006)
- Academy (2006)
- Fashionably Late for the Relationship (with Lián Amaris, 2007)
- Hindsight is Always 20/20 (2008)
- SSB (with Lesley Flanigan, 2008)
- Hard Data (2009)
- A Year in Mp3s (2009–2010)
- Moments of Inertia (with Todd Reynolds, 2010)
- A More Perfect Union (2011)
- The Marigny Parade (2011)
- Vertical Music (2012)
- Sergey Brin and Larry Page (2013)
- Circus Sarasota (2014)
- Take a Bullet For This City (2014)
- Learning Machine #1: Values (2016)
- Learning Machine #2: Image (2016)
- Learning Machine #3: Sound (2016)
- Learning Machine #4: Language (2016)
- Learning Machine #5: Symbols (2016)
- The Choice Is Yours: Exit Poll (2016)

== Discography ==
- The Freight Elevator Quartet (Electronic Music Foundation, 1997)
- The Freight Elevator Quartet's Jungle Album (Electronic Music Foundation, 1998)
- DJ Spooky vs. the Freight Elevator Quartet: File Under Futurism (Caipirinha/Sire, 1999)
- This Is Jungle Sky, Vol 6: Funk (Compilation, Liquid Sky Music, 1999)
- File Under Futurism EP (with DJ Spooky and A Guy Called Gerald) (Caipirinha/Sire, 1999)
- Open Ends (Compilation, Museum Music, 2000)
- The Freight Elevator Quartet Becoming Transparent (Caipirinha/Sire, 2000)
- Exasperation EP (with JMD, Kit Clayton, Datach'i) (Caipirinha/Sire, 2000)
- State of the Union 2.001 (Compilation, Electronic Music Foundation, 2001)
- Radiolaria (Elliott Sharp, zOaR Music, 2001)
- The Freight Elevator Quartet Fix it in Post (Cycling'74 Music, 2001)
- Decasia (Michael Gordon, Cantaloupe Music, 2002)
- Light Is Calling (Michael Gordon, Nonesuch, 2004)
- Messiah Remix (Cantaloupe Music, 2004)
- Timelapse (Cantaloupe Music, 2006)
- The Marigny Parade (Cantaloupe Music, 2011)
- Sunken Cathedral (Bora Yoon, Innova, 2014)
