= Young Miss America =

Studio album by Gold Chains
- Released: June 3, 2003
- Genre: Electronic hip-hop
- Length: 48:13
- Label: PIAS
- Producer: Kit Clayton; Topher LaFata

Gold Chains chronology
Young Miss America (2003)	When the World Was Our Friend (2004)

Young Miss America is the debut full-length studio album by American electronic hip-hop musician Gold Chains. It was released on June 3, 2003 via PIAS Recordings. Production was handled by Gold Chains himself together with Kit Clayton at Zombie Studios in San Francisco.

== Critical reception ==
Professional ratings
Aggregate scores
Source	Rating
Metacritic	72/100
Review scores
Source	Rating
AllMusic	3.5/5 stars
Now	2/5 Ns
Pitchfork	6.7/10
Stylus	B−
Tiny Mix Tapes	4/5 marks
Uncut	1.5/5 stars

Young Miss America was met with generally favorable reviews from music critics. At Metacritic, which assigns a normalized rating out of 100 to reviews from mainstream publications, the album received an average score of 72, based on twelve reviews.

== Track listing ==
No.	Title	Length
1.	"Code Red"	3:33
2.	"Several Times Defined"	4:51
3.	"The Game"	3:39
4.	"What Are We Looking For"	4:08
5.	"Much Currency Flows"	5:30
6.	"Nada"	4:28
7.	"Revolution"	3:53
8.	"Young Miss America"	4:35
9.	"Break or Be Broken"	4:54
10.	"Citizens Nowhere"	4:39
11.	"Let's Get It On"	4:03
Total length:		48:13

== Personnel ==
- Christopher "Gold Chains" LaFata – guitar solos, producer, design, artwork
- Joshua Kit Clayton – producer, design, artwork
- Paul Costuros – additional saxophone
- Amy Morrell – additional vocals
- Abigail Martin – additional vocals
- Erin Weber – additional vocals
- Gina Basso – additional vocals
- Jill Herrera – additional vocals
- Kim West – additional vocals
- Lili Lewicka – additional vocals
- Sue Costabile – additional vocals, design, artwork
- Jibz Cameron – additional vocals
- Rosa Perkins-Meyers – additional vocals
- Jason "Lesser" Doerck – loops
- Christian Dixon – additional vocals, additional guitar, bass
- Jon Santos – design, artwork
- Slanginternational.org – logo
