= María Elena González =

Cuban-American artist (born 1957)

- Born: 1957; Havana, Cuba
- Education: San Francisco State University, Florida International University
- Known for: Sculpture, installation art, public art, works on paper
- Awards: Guggenheim Fellowship, Rome Prize, Anonymous Was a Woman Award, Joan Mitchell Foundation, Pollock-Krasner Foundation

María Elena González, "Tree Talk" exhibition, Mills College Art Museum, 2019.

María Elena González (born 1957) is a Cuban-American sculptor based in Brooklyn and the Bay Area. She is known for objects, installations and public art that interweave post-minimalist form, conceptual art and concern for materials and craft. Her early work explored themes of memory, family, identity, loss and dislocation through formal, architectural and mapping modes that address site, place and social circumstances; her later work makes connections between nature and art, engaging a broad range of media and sensory experience. In 2020, artist and scholar Ellen Levy wrote "González's art re-invents nature as culture" through an "exquisite attunement" that uncovers formal and thematic analogies between both realms and synesthetic connections between visual and aural senses.

González has been awarded a Guggenheim Fellowship, the Rome Prize, and an Anonymous Was a Woman Award, among other recognition. Her work belongs to the public collections of international museums including the Solomon R. Guggenheim Museum, Kunstmuseum Basel, Museum of Arts and Design, and Museum Arnhem (The Netherlands).

== Education and career ==
González was born in 1957 in Havana. In 1968, her family was exiled and moved to Miami. She earned sculpture degrees from Florida International University (BFA, 1979) and San Francisco State University (MA, 1983), where she was influenced by minimalist and conceptual art. In 1984, she moved to New York City.

González began receiving wide recognition through solo exhibitions at El Museo del Barrio (1996–97), Hallwalls (1998), The Project (1999) and the Bronx Museum of Art (2002), as well as her public art project Magic Carpet/Home (1999/2003), presented by the Public Art Fund and Los Angeles Contemporary Exhibitions (LACE), respectively. She has had later solo exhibitions at The Project (2002, 2006), Knoedler & Co. (2006, 2008) and Hirschl & Adler Modern (2017) in New York, Contemporary Museum, Honolulu (2006) and Galerie Gisèle Linder (Basel, 2005, 2009, 2011), among other venues. Her work has appeared in surveys including "Greater New York" (MoMA PS1, 2000), Sonsbeek 9 (2001), "The Shapes of Space" (Guggenheim Museum, 2007), "Home: So Different, So Appealing" (LACMA, 2017), and "Relational Undercurrents: Contemporary Art of the Caribbean Archipelago" (Museum of Latin American Art, 2017).

In addition to her art practice, González has taught at the Skowhegan School of Painting and Sculpture, Cooper Union and the San Francisco Art Institute(SFAI).

María Elena González, Magic Carpet/Home, 1999, Coffey Park, Brooklyn, NY, Public Art Fund.

== Early sculptures and installations ==
Critic Martha Schwendener described González's early work as understated and informed by architecture and her past, noting "like Eva Hesse and Roni Horn, [Gonzalez] interlards the vocabulary of Minimalism with personal detail … Loss clings to her work and her materials function like updated Proustian madeleines." Her sculptural installation Resting Spots (1999) consisted of low, wooden columnar shapes like curved drums covered with white tile The New York Times likened to a collaboration between Antonio Gaudi and Agnes Martin; suggesting seats, they served as memorial markers for her deceased parents.

In several projects, González explored similar themes by mapping the architectural floor plans of homes onto minimalist forms using outlines akin to blueprints. For the site-specific outdoor sculpture Magic Carpet/Home (1999/2003/2017)—installed in parks in Red Hook, Brooklyn, Pittsburgh and Los Angeles—González painted the plans of local public-housing units onto undulating wood platforms surfaced with recycled rubber playground material. Critics noted the work's unusual juxtapositions—pointed social commentary, "high" modernist allusions (to artists such as Carl Andre) and broad appeal—which transformed grim social realities into a wavy flying carpet evoking fantasy and imagination. Peter Schjeldahl described the work's LACMA presentation (2017) as "laconically unsettling" in its superimposition of cramped quarters on a playground structure in a grassy park.

Mnemonic Architecture (Bronx Museum of Art, 2002) was a knowingly inaccurate, full-size recreation from memory of the layout of González's childhood home in Cuba using lines that vanished or came into focus depending on vantage point. Her "UN Real Estates" exhibition (Art in General, 2003) explored the transitory experience of immigrants, refugees (and artists), connecting memory, imagination, architecture and a sense of home as fluid; it employed residential floor plans embossed onto wavy concrete tiles arranged in patterns or imprinted on mat-like panels of thick, translucent rubber.

María Elena González, "Internal DupliCity" exhibition, Knoedler & Co., New York City, 2006.

In exhibitions including solos at The Project and Knoedler & Co. (2002, 2006), González expanded her formal repertory in less overtly autobiographical and more theatrical directions. The first show conveyed a mood of unease and suppressed emotional energy that centered on a fragile, ominous-looking electrical tower structure that was repeated in hand-altered photographic negatives, a small glass sculpture, and a silhouette traced on paper with fingernail clippings. The second show, titled "Internal DupliCity," presented nine minimal, blood-red architectural forms set atop white pedestals and encased in cubes of frosted plexiglass partly obscuring them that Holland Cotter characterized as "a phantom city, familiar but inaccessible, filtered through mist." The structures—based on memories of Renaissance villas, agrarian sheds, burial vaults and churches seen during a Rome fellowship—conjured associations with Catholic reliquaries, dollhouses and longtime themes of loss and remembered or imagined homes.

== Later projects and exhibitions ==
In subsequent years, González has moved toward a deep contemplation of nature and landscape, explored in a synesthetic body of work engaging diverse materials, media (sound, video, music, sculpture and works on paper) and the visual, aural, tactile and kinetic senses. in 2010, she created the outdoor, site-specific work, You & Me (Storm King Art Center), installing beams and platforms across a sculpture park that invited participants to stand in designated spaces, making them appear to be located on or within other works of art.

González's later work—in particular, the ten-plus-year project Tree Talk—was initially inspired by her experience of birch trees in the Maine woods surrounding the Skowhegan School in 2005. Fascinated with the white bark and its code-like black lines and striations (lenticels), she began stripping it from fallen trees, striving to capture the distinct "personality" of each one in vellum collages, flattened presentations and rubbings (e.g., Bark Framed #5, 2012; T2 (Bark), 2015). After connecting the bark markings visually to the format of player piano music rolls, she became interested in the idea of the trees communicating and digitally translated the patterns of three birches, then laser-cut rolls for player piano. The resulting "scores"— played on actual player pianos as performances or recordings within several exhibitions—have been described by reviewers as unexpectedly modern, "dark and atonal," and "haunting."

In the exhibitions "Tempo" (Hirschl & Adler Modern, 2017) and "Tree Talk" (Mills College Art Museum, Brattleboro Museum and Art Center, 2019), González offered multisensory, multimodal ruminations on art and nature. They included a video installation depicting a view of Lake Wesserunsett (where she first conceived the Tree Talk series) joined by two miniature chairs crafted from birch collected on-site; cylindrical objects made in wood, concrete and ceramic that echoed the shape of the piano music roll; large-scale rubbings and abstracted drawings of bark grain; and framed fragments of the actual bark. For the Mills College show, González collaborated with composers John Ivers and Marc Zollinger.

González's subsequent series, titled "Repairs" (2020– ), developed out of "Tree Talk," the COVID-19 pandemic and the closure of SFAI, as well as broader concerns regarding the environment and material consumption. Its sculptures have been sourced from broken and discarded materials—damaged ceramic mugs and plates, found porcelain and wood scraps—that she collects or "repairs" to create new works.

== Recognition ==
González has been awarded fellowships from the Guggenheim (2006) and Fleishhacker (2019) foundations, the American Academy in Rome Prize (2003–04), and the grand prize of the 30th Biennial of Graphic Arts (2013). She has received grants from the Cintas Foundation (1989, 1994), Pollock-Krasner Foundation (1991, 1998, 2010), Anonymous Was a Woman (1997), Louis Comfort Tiffany Foundation (1997), Joan Mitchell Foundation (1998), and Creative Capital (1999), among other awards.

Her work belongs to the public collections of the Kunstmuseum Basel, Contemporary Museum, Honolulu, Museum Biedermann, Museum of Arts and Design, The New School for Social Research, North Carolina Museum of Art, Rhode Island School of Design Museum, Solomon R. Guggenheim Museum and Museum Arnhem, among others.
