= FEQ =

FEQ may refer to:

- Festival d'été de Québec
- Freight Elevator Quartet
- FEQ, a grade of teak wood
