= What's It All About (Pat Metheny album) =

Studio album by Pat Metheny
- Released: June 14, 2011
- Recorded: February 2011
- Studio: Right Track, New York City
- Genre: Jazz, folk jazz, Americana
- Length: 55:50
- Label: Nonesuch
- Producer: Pat Metheny

Pat Metheny chronology
Orchestrion (2010)	What's It All About (2011)	Unity Band (2012)

Professional ratings
Review scores
Source	Rating
AllMusic	4/5 stars
All About Jazz	4/5 stars
Tom Hull	B+

What's It All About is a solo album by jazz guitarist Pat Metheny, released by Nonesuch Records on June 14, 2011. It is Metheny's first album which does not include his own material. On February 12, 2012, What's It All About received a Grammy Award for Best New Age Album.

== Track listing ==
No.	Title	Writer(s)	Length
1.	"The Sound of Silence"	Paul Simon	6:33
2.	"Cherish"	Terry Kirkman	5:28
3.	"Alfie"	Burt Bacharach, Hal David	7:46
4.	"Pipeline"	Bob Spickard, Brian Carman	3:28
5.	"Garota de Ipanema"	Antônio Carlos Jobim, Vinicius de Moraes	5:12
6.	"Rainy Days and Mondays"	Roger Nichols, Paul Williams	7:12
7.	"That's the Way I've Always Heard It Should Be"	Carly Simon, Jacob Brackman	6:03
8.	"Slow Hot Wind"	Henry Mancini, Norman Gimbel	4:28
9.	"Betcha by Golly, Wow"	Thom Bell, Linda Creed	5:18
10.	"And I Love Her"	John Lennon, Paul McCartney	4:22

Bonus track on LP and digital download
No.	Title	Writer(s)	Length
11.	"'Round Midnight"	Thelonious Monk	6:37

Bonus track on LP
No.	Title	Writer(s)	Length
12.	"This Nearly Was Mine"	Richard Rodgers, Oscar Hammerstein II	4:29

== Personnel ==
- Pat Metheny – baritone guitar, 42-string guitar (track 1), 6-string guitar (track 4), nylon-string guitar (track 10)

=== Technical personnel ===
- Pat Metheny – producer
- Robert Hurwitz – executive producer
- Pat Metheny, Pete Karam, David Oakes – recording
- Pete Karam – mixing
- Ted Jensen – mastering at Sterling Sound, NYC, USA
- Barbara de Wilde – design
- Sandrine Lee – photography

== Charts ==
Chart (2011)	Peak position
US Top Jazz Albums (Billboard)	1
US Billboard 200	125

== Awards ==
Grammy Awards

Year	Category
2012	Grammy Award for Best New Age Album
