= Lián Amaris =

American writer, artist, and scholar

- Born: Springfield, Massachusetts
- Occupations: Performance artist, writer, communicator
- Years active: 2002–present
- Website: http://lianamaris.com

Lian Amaris is an American writer, artist, and creative communicator working to connect real world experiences, performance events and the new media landscape. She is Artistic Director of Vector Art Ensemble and has authored five plays and performances that have been professionally produced at such venues as Nuyorican Poets Cafe, HERE Arts Center, The University of Chicago, P.S. 122, the Contemporary Arts Center (New Orleans) and The University of Massachusetts. Her work also includes popular memes such as Silicon Valley Ryan Gosling and Things that cannot screen for breast cancer.

== Career ==
Amaris has master's degrees in Performance Studies and in Interactive Telecommunications, both from New York University, and has contributed articles on performance and media to Theatre Journal, TDR: The Drama Review, and Explorations on Media Ecology, along with several edited collections. In 2011, she was a writing resident with Volunteer Lawyers for the Arts and, in 2012, she was a writer for The Next Web. She has presented her art and scholarship at nine international conferences and at more than 20 festivals, including such venues as Cambridge University, UC Berkeley, UC Santa Cruz, and the Centro Cultural Recoleta in Argentina. After three years as a professor of performance studies and digital media at Colorado College, Amaris joined the Education Division of the Brooklyn Museum, where for a year she oversaw programs for college and graduate students and worked to bridge the gaps between performance, visual arts, and new media through public programs. In her capacity as a researcher and editor for Douglas Rushkoff, she worked with him on his books Program or be Programmed: Ten Commands for a Digital Age; Life, Inc.: How the World Became A Corporation and How To Take It Back; and Get Back in the Box: Innovation from the Inside Out.

Since 2011, Amaris has been based in the San Francisco Bay Area and has engaged actively with both the Art and Tech scenes.

== Notable theatrical works ==
- Mercury's Ashes: A Rock Monologue (2015–16 at The Arsenal Center for the Arts and Salem Theatre Company, MA). Writer and Director.
- The Video Game Monologues (2013 at The Phoenix Theatre, Yerba Buena Center for the Arts and Cartoon Art Museum, San Francisco; Nuyorican Poets Cafe, NYC). Writer and Director.
- All My Mother's Diets (2011 at Oberon, MA) Director. Written by Thomas Naughton.
- Daddy's Black and Jewish (2011 at Nuyorican Poets Cafe, NYC). Directed by Melissa Moschitto.
- Swimming to Spalding (2009 at HERE Arts Center, 2011 at University of Massachusetts and at Contemporary Arts Center (New Orleans). Directed by Richard Schechner, inspired by Spalding Gray's Swimming to Cambodia
- Fashionably Late For The Relationship (2007 in Union Square, NYC). With R. Luke DuBois.
- Corpus Projecti (2005–07 at New York University, Colorado College, The University of Chicago, and the Recoleta Cultural Center in Argentina )
- 14 UnNatural Acts (2003–05 at Trinity College, Pacific Northwest College of Art, The Annex Theatre in Houston)
- Two From Kafka (2003 at New York University)
- Certain Dark Things / Ciertas Cosas Oscuras (2002 at the University of Massachusetts)

== Scholarship ==
Book chapters

- "Calendar Art: How the 1968 SNCC Wall Calendar Brought Activism Indoors" in Activism in Modern U.S. Print Culture. Ed. Rachel Schreiber. Ashgate. 2012.
- "Seriously Fun: Marketing and the Gaming Experience of Nolan's The Dark Knight" in S(t)imulated Realities: The Hyperreal in Popular Culture. Ed. Robin DeRosa. McFarland Publishing. 2011.
- "Fragmented Self-Portraits: How the Historical Avant-Garde Foretold Online Identity Construction" in Digital Visual Culture: Intersections and Interactions in 21st Century Art Education. The National Art Education Association. 2011.
- "Mourning Amongst the Famous: Madame Tussaud's Wax Memorial of 9/11" in 9/11 in Popular Culture. Praeger. 2010.
- "Directing Feminism: The Experience of Ellen McLaughlin's The Trojan Women" in Beyond Burning Bras: Feminist Activism for Everyone Eds. Laura Finley and Emily Reynolds Stringer. Praeger. 2010.

Journal articles

- "Approaching an Analog-Digital Dialectic: The Case of The Blue Man Group". Theatre Journal. Johns Hopkins University Press. December, 2009. 563-573. Refereed article.
- "Biting Off the Tongue of Discourse: How Sarah Kane's 4:48 Psychosis Performs as Hélène Cixous's Laughing Medusa". Journal of Drama Studies. Viva Books. Spring 2009. Refereed article.
- "Beauty and the Street: 72 Hours in Union Square, NYC". TDR: The Drama Review. The MIT Press. Winter 2008. Solicited article.
- "Sorry for your loss: Grieving and Griefing in World of Warcraft". Explorations in Media Ecology. Hampton Press. Fall 2006. Solicited article.

Conferences

- 2011 Volunteer Lawyers for the Arts: Art and Law Symposium, "Art Beyond the Centerfold: Copyright, Cultural Restriction, and Playboy" as part of 2011 Art and Law Writing Residency.
- 2011 Brooklyn Museum Academic Symposium: “From Portraits to Pin-ups: Representations of Women in Art and Popular Culture.” Symposium organizer, curator, and moderator.
- 2009 Popular Culture Association Conference, New Orleans, LA (Panel Chair): “Seriously Fun: Viral Marketing and the Gaming Experience of Nolan's The Dark Knight”
- 2009 Northeast Modern Language Association, Boston University, MA: “'Immediate and Painful:' How Guido Crepax's Graphic Novel Venus in Furs Performs Artaud's Concept of Cruelty”
- 2008 Radical Philosophy Association Conference, San Francisco State University, CA: “Biting Off the Tongue of Discourse: How Sarah Kane's 4:48 Psychosis Performs as Hélène Cixous's Laughing Medusa
- 2008 Association of Theatre in Higher Education, Denver, CO: “Beautiful Street Theater: 72 hours on the Union Square Traffic Island, NYC”
- 2008 Berkeley Big Bang New Media Symposium, University of California at Berkeley, CA: “Female Embodiment and New Media” (Invited Artist Talk)
- 2008 International Colloquium On Tourism & Leisure, Chiang Mai, Thailand: “Performing the Red Carpet: The Production of Madame Tussaud's Wax Museum as the Tourism of Celebrity”
- 2008 Popular Culture Association Conference, San Francisco, CA: “Beauty And The Street: Performing the Private for New York City”
- 2008 Sarah Kane Reassessments Conference, University of Cambridge, England: “’Look away from me’: How Sarah Kane's 4:48 Psychosis performs as Hélène Cixous's Laughing Medusa”
- 2006 Media Ecology Association Conference, Boston College, MA: “Sorry for your loss: Grieving and Griefing in World of Warcraft”

== Other theatrical appearances ==
- The Man Who Sold The World (2012) as The Star. Directed by Toby Dixon.
- The Ballad of Betsy Paradise (2012) as Betsy Paradise. Directed by Joy Brooke Fairfield.
- That's Not How Maher Died (2006) as Alma Mahler. Directed by Ryan Holsopple.
