= Matthew McLendon =

American museum director, historian, and curator

- Occupations: Museum Director and CEO
- Organization: McNay Art Museum

Matthew McLendon (born 1977) is an American museum director, art historian, and curator of modern and contemporary art. McLendon serves as Director and CEO of the McNay Art Museum in San Antonio, Texas.

== Life and education ==
Florida native McLendon grew up in Palatka in the northeast part of the state. A Phi Beta Kappa graduate of Florida State University, McLendon earned bachelor's degrees with honors in both music and art history. While at FSU, McLendon was appointed to the first internship in the Department of Education and Public Programming at the Tate Gallery London. He completed his MA and PhD studies at the Courtauld Institute of Art in London, and is an alumnus of the 64th Attingham Summer School. His master's thesis was focused on the war works of Wyndham Lewis and his dissertation on the manifestos of the Italian Futurists of the early 20th century.

== Career ==
McLendon was named Interim Curator of Adult Learning at Tate Britain in 2002, where he was responsible for public programming related to the Turner Prize awarded to Keith Tyson. After returning to the United States, he was named the inaugural Curator of Academic Initiatives at the Cornell Fine Arts Museum, where he worked on exhibitions serving both collegiate and community audiences including Michael Phillips and the Infernal Method of William Blake (2009), and Andy Warhol: Personalities (2010)

In 2010, McLendon was recruited by The Ringling to reinvigorate its modern and contemporary programs, after a fifteen-year gap in curatorial leadership. In the first two years of his tenure, McLendon oversaw the permanent installation of Joseph's Coat, the largest Skyspace by James Turrell to date, as well as three exhibitions from the museum's permanent collection and two major exhibitions focused on living artists.

In addition to a revived emphasis on original exhibitions and collection building, McLendon established the Art of Our Time initiative, in conjunction with Ringling Curator of Performance Dwight Currie. The series was created to spotlight emerging and mid-career visual and performing artists, build on the success of the Ringling International Arts Festival inaugurated by the Museum and the Baryshnikov Arts Center in 2009, and renew the contemporary art commitment made by The Ringling's first director, A. Everett "Chick" Austin. In 2016, the initiative celebrated its fifth anniversary with a major gift to support the series and create a new gallery dedicated to contemporary art. With the addition of the Monda Gallery, four rededicated galleries in the Searing Wing, and the in-progress Kotler-Coville Glass Pavilion, close to 10,000 square feet was devoted to the contemporary program during McLendon's tenure. In December 2016, Hyperallergic named McLendon's R. Luke DuBois—Now one of the top 15 exhibitions in the United States.

McLendon was appointed director and chief curator of the Fralin Museum of Art in November 2016, assuming the role at the University of Virginia in January 2017. In 2018, the position was endowed with a $3 million gift as the J. Sanford Miller Family Director. During McLendon's tenure, the museum expanded and diversified its permanent collection, notably increasing major support, museum attendance, and exhibition coverage in national media.

McLendon has taught at the undergraduate and graduate level at University of Virginia, Florida State University, New College of Florida, and Rollins College.

== Key exhibitions ==
- 20th Century Abstract Art from the Permanent Collection (2010)
- Josef Albers: Color (2011)
- Luminosity (2011)
- Beyond Bling: Voices of Hip-Hop in Art (2011)
- Zimoun: Sculpting Sound (2011)
- Sanford Biggers: Codex (2012)
- The Warren J. and Margot Coville Photography Collection (2012)
- The Philip and Nancy Kotler Glass Collection (2012)
- The Sarasota School of Architecture (2013)
- R. Luke DuBois—Now (2014)
- Beth Lipman: Precarious Possessions (2014)
- Re:Purposed (2015)
- EMIT: What the Bringback Brought, Trenton Doyle Hancock (2015)
- Paul Rudolph: The Guest Houses (2015)
- Anne Patterson: Pathless Woods (2016)
- Toni Dove: Embodied Machines (2018)
- Vanessa German: sometimes.we.cannot.be.with.our.bodies (2019)
- Joseph Cornell: Enclosing Infinity (2022)

== Selected guest lectures and events ==
- L’arte di far manifesti: Marinetti's ‘collaging’ of the Manifesto, Matthew McLendon, 97th Annual College Art Association Conference, Los Angeles (2009)
- Engaging the Crowd: The Futurist Manifesto as Avant-Garde Advertisement, Matthew McLendon, Back to the Futurists: Avant-Gardes 1909–2009, Queen Mary University of London, Royal Holloway, University of London, and University of Swansea, London (2009)
- The Italian Futurists: Art + Architecture, Dr. Matthew McLendon, Sarasota Architecture Foundation Lecture Series, Sarasota, FL (2013)
- Michael Wyshock's Water Threads with Matthew McLendon, Lu Magnus, New York (2014)
- In Conversation: R. Luke DuBois and Matthew McLendon, Orange County Museum of Art, Newport Beach, CA (2015)
- R. Luke DuBois: On Art and Performance, Matthew McLendon, Bowdoin College Museum of Art, Brunswick, ME (2016)
- A Dream Team: The Curator, Fundraiser, and Philanthropist, Matthew McLendon and Anna Von Gehr, American Alliance of Museums Annual Meeting, Washington, DC (2016)
- Weed Heart: Conversation with Matthew McLendon and Jill Sigman, Gibney Dance, Agnes Varis Performing Arts Center, New York (2016)
- When the Other Shoe Drops: Essential Steps to Effective Crisis Communication, Matthew McLendon, Convener and Moderator, American Alliance of Museums Annual Meeting, New Orleans, LA (2019)
- Color Light Motion, Episode 12: Toni Dove, Matthew McLendon, respondent, UCLA Art | Sci Center, Los Angeles, CA, Harvestworks, New York, NY, David Bermant Foundation, Santa Barbara, CA (2022)
- Professional Achievement Award, Florida State University, Department of Art History, Tallahassee, FL (2024)
