= Freight Elevator Quartet =

The Freight Elevator Quartet
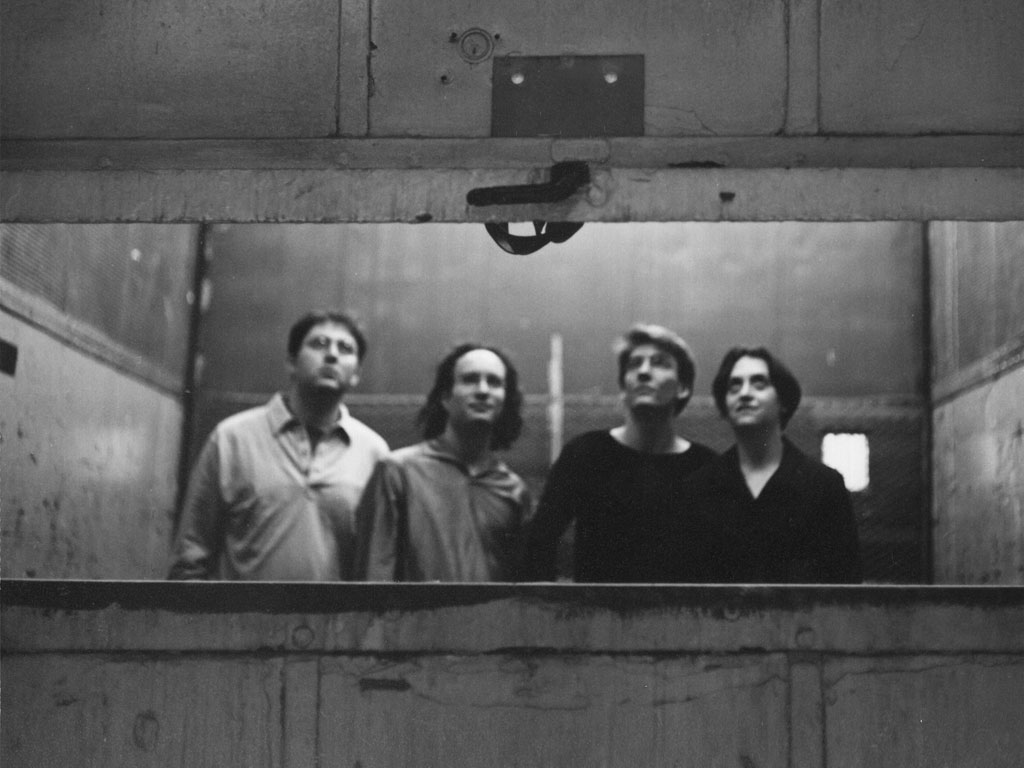
- The Freight Elevator Quartet in 1998. From left to right: Paul Feuer, Stephen Krieger, R. Luke DuBois, Rachael Finn.

Background information
- Origin: New York City
- Genres: Electronica; Drum and Bass; Downtempo; Experimental Music; Computer Music
- Years active: 1997–2003
- Labels: Caipirinha / Sire; Cycling'74 Music
- Members: R. Luke DuBois; Paul Feuer; Rachael Finn; Stephen Krieger

The Freight Elevator Quartet (FEQ) were a music performance group specializing in improvised electronic music active in and around New York City. They performed and recorded continuously from 1996 to 2003, and collaborated extensively with experimental music artists such as DJ Spooky and Elliott Sharp, and avant-garde videographer Mark McNamara.

In addition to using electronic instruments (originally analog synthesizers and drum machines, later laptops and samplers), they also sported fairly unusual acoustic instrumentation, having a cellist and a didjeridoo player in their regular line-up. FEQ began as a house band for a series of warehouse parties on 125th Street in New York City, famously playing their first gig in a freight elevator. Their eponymous first record, released in 1997, was completely made of live recordings from shows played in their first year of performing, featuring the lineup of Stephen Krieger on drum machine, Rachael Finn on amplified cello, Paul Feuer on didjeridoo, and R. Luke DuBois on Buchla and Serge analog synthesizers. Their second and subsequent records saw the gradual expansion of their instrumentation (starting with Feuer doubling on keyboards and DuBois playing guitars) until by the time of their break-up in 2003 the entire band was effectively composed of multi-instrumentalists.

As a conceptual project the Freight Elevator Quartet combined influences from experimental music and conceptual art as well as a strong interest in musical Futurism (played out in their joint recording with DJ Spooky, File Under Futurism). In their liner notes, they referred to themselves as a group of musicians in the present imagining the past imaging the future, a concept akin to the literary conceit of Steampunk; by combining cutting-edge digital (computers, samplers), obsolescent solid state (analog synthesizers), classical 18th century (cello), and aboriginal (didjeridoo) instrumentation, the group deliberately confused the temporal reference point of their music. Stylistically FEQ was known to appropriate whatever genres they felt like, working to fuse different styles of breakbeat, drum and bass, downtempo, digital hardcore, rock, hip hop, classical, and, most conspicuously, academic computer music. Though always billing themselves as an electronica act, their music has many stylistic similarities to the later genre of post-rock. Most of their recordings are culled from composite takes of live performances, though they have released two studio albums as well, both of which feature songs with guest vocalists, including Lorraine Lelis of the band Mahogany and Spezialmaterial recording artist Josh Druckman (as JMD).

The Freight Elevator Quartet were for many years the unofficial ensemble-in-residence of the Computer Music Center, Columbia University. Following their breakup, DuBois remained active as a laptop musician and conceptual artist, working extensively with contemporary and avant-garde music performance composers and groups, such as LEMUR, Christian Marclay, Bang on a Can composer Michael Gordon, vocalist Lesley Flanigan, and violinist/composer Todd Reynolds.

== Members ==
- R. Luke DuBois - analog synthesizers, Max/MSP programming, laptop performance, guitars, bass, keyboards
- Paul Feuer - didjeridoo, digital synthesizers, banjo, percussion
- Rachael Finn - cello, effects processing, drum programming
- Stephen Krieger - drum programming, sampler performance, synthesizers, music production

also

- Johnathan F. Lee - bass guitar, drum programming
- Ken Thomson - saxophone
- Mark McNamara - video artist

== Discography ==
- The Freight Elevator Quartet (Electronic Music Foundation, 1997)
- The Freight Elevator Quartet's Jungle Album (Electronic Music Foundation, 1998)
- DJ Spooky vs. the Freight Elevator Quartet: File Under Futurism (Caipirinha/Sire, 1999)
- File Under Futurism EP (with DJ Spooky and A Guy Called Gerald) (Caipirinha/Sire, 1999)
- The Freight Elevator Quartet Becoming Transparent (Caipirinha/Sire, 2000)
- Exasperation EP (with JMD, Kit Clayton, Datach'i) (Caipirinha/Sire, 2000)
- The Freight Elevator Quartet Fix it in Post (Cycling'74 Music, 2001)
