= Doug DuBois =

American photographer

Doug DuBois (born 1960) is an American photographer based in Syracuse, New York. He is an associate professor and department chair of Art Photography at the College of Visual and Performing Arts at Syracuse University.

The bulk of DuBois' photography is portraiture, and he is well known for photographs of intimate familial scenes. He is among a group of contemporary American photographers, including Philip-Lorca diCorcia, Laurie Simmons, Cindy Sherman, and Tina Barney, whose re-imagined depictions of domestic spaces anticipated the transformations of family life among a "tidal wave of late-capitalist individualism and aspiration."

DuBois is a recipient of a 2012 Guggenheim Fellowship, and his work is in the collections of MoMA in New York, SFMOMA in San Francisco, LACMA and the Getty in Los Angeles, the Library of Congress in Washington, D.C., and the Victoria and Albert Museum in London.

== Early life and education ==
DuBois was born in Dearborn, MI and grew up in the suburban New Jersey community of Far Hills. As a teenager he began taking photographs with a rangefinder camera he found in his father's closet. He has a younger sister Lise and a younger brother, the composer R. Luke DuBois, who appear often in his early photographs.

DuBois graduated from Hampshire College with a Bachelor of Arts in Film and Photography and subsequently received a Masters of Fine Arts in Photography from the San Francisco Art Institute.

== Photography ==
In between his undergraduate and graduate educations, his father suffered a near-fatal fall from a commuter train and spent several years convalescing in the home, and DuBois documented this process as a "kind of emotional protection." These family portraits formed the basis of a body of work surrounding his family that would continue for twenty-four years and eventually come to be published by Aperture as a photo-book titled All the Days and Nights. The photographs in this series document his changing family: his father's recovery from his injuries juxtaposed with the descent of his mother, his father's sole caretaker, into the depths of depression and mental illness, the subsequent dissolution of his parents' marriage, as well as the maturation of his brother and sister.

DuBois's interest in the family, both his and others, is also evident in a subsequent photo series, "Avella," which chronicles life in the deindustrialized coal-mining town of Avella, Pennsylvania, where his father grew up. To learn about his family's hometown DuBois would drive his grandmother around in his aunt's car while she identified local landmarks and told stories, often taking pictures as they traveled. He documents the decay and blight of the town, but also the families which live among such an environment of insularity and lack of opportunity. The photographs challenge American "myths" surrounding upward economic mobility and question how American families survive amid economic uncertainty.

The themes of economic uncertainty and provincial life are likewise central to DuBois' recent photo series, which was published as the book My Last Day at Seventeen. These photographs depict working class teenagers in a housing estate in Cobh, County Cork, Ireland after the collapse of the Celtic Tiger economy as a result of the 2008 financial crisis. The series represents the anxiety inherent to the transition from adolescence to adulthood, and how the subjects' anxiety regarding the future is mirrored by their economic uncertainty. Shot over five summers, the series presents an "endless summer" in which precariously-situated teenagers perform identities informed by an international popular visual culture but mediated through a local context.

DuBois carefully composes his compositions with supplementary lighting, and uses either a medium format or a large format folding camera with a cloak. He does not consider his work to be documentary, rather he views each photo as a collaborative endeavor between artist and subject which is based in truth. DuBois will often stage or recreate photographs, sometimes even alluding to visual works which are not his own, and has borrowed the literary term "creative nonfiction" to describe his work.

== Educator ==
He is an associate professor and department chair of Art Photography at the College of Visual and Performing Arts at Syracuse University.

== Publications by DuBois ==
- All the Days and Nights. New york: Aperture, 2009. ISBN 978-1597110983.
- My Last Day at Seventeen. New York: Aperture, 2015. Includes a graphic novel component illustrated by Patrick Lynch. ISBN 978-1-59711-313-7.

== Awards ==
- 2012: Guggenheim Fellowship, John Simon Guggenheim Memorial Foundation, New York

== Collections ==
- J. Paul Getty Museum, Los Angeles: 1 print (as of August 2020)
- Library of Congress, Washington, D.C.: 1 print (as of August 2020)
- Los Angeles County Museum of Art, Los Angeles: 12 prints (as of August 2020)
- Museum of Modern Art, New York
- San Francisco Museum of Modern Art, San Francisco
- Victoria and Albert Museum, London: 2 prints (as of August 2020)
