= GuitarBot =

Self-playing guitar

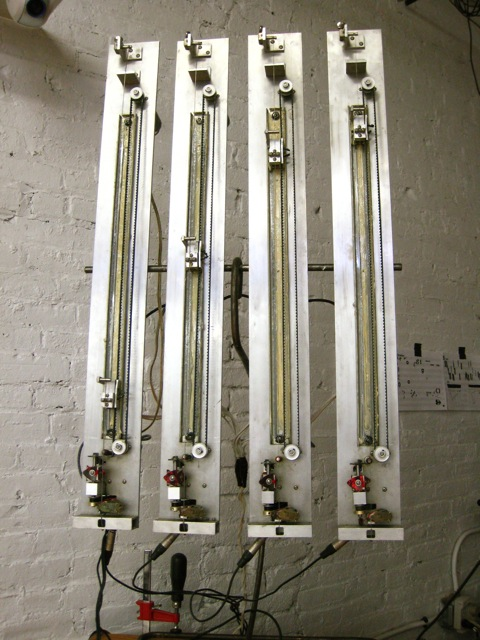
LEMUR GuitarBot at LEMUR's Brooklyn studio

GuitarBot is a self-playing guitar created by the League of Electronic Musical Urban Robots (LEMUR) in 2002. The instrument consists of four modular string units, each of which can be controlled with MIDI. GuitarBot was used by guitarist Pat Metheny on his 2009 Orchestrion tour.

== Mechanical ==
The GuitarBot modules are built on an aluminum base. Each base serves as a mounting point for the module's string, moving bridge subsystem, and pickwheel subsystem. The modules measure 91 centimeters long by 10 centimeters wide and are mounted vertically on a purpose-built support structure, which also houses the units' electronics.

=== Changing Pitch ===
GuitarBot uses a belt-drive mechanism to change pitch. An encoder-equipped DC motor drives a belt with an attached movable fret. As the belt moves the movable fret, the string's pitch is changed. The movable fret is mounted on a ball bearing linear slide, and can traverse its full displacement of 54.4 centimeters in 250 ms.

GuitarBot's movable fret system is configured as a slide mechanism and remains in constant contact with the string. To reduce friction between GuitarBot's wire-wound strings and the movable fret, flatwound strings are used. The flatwound strings' lack of ridges allow the movable bridge to slide over the string smoothly.

Other mechatronic guitar and string-playing systems that employ similar pitch-shifting mechanisms include Nicholas A. Baginsky's Aglaopheme self-playing guitar, Trimpin's prototype KrautKontrol guitar systems, James McVay's MechBass, and Festo Automation's Sound Machines.

=== String picking and damping ===
String picking is accomplished with a rotary pick wheel mechanism. Four picks are attached to an idler pulley on a belt-driven DC motor. As the motor spins, the pick wheel rotates.

A solenoid actuator is used to dampen GuitarBot's strings.

== Electronics and software ==
Each GuitarBot module uses a PIC microcontroller to handle motor control, feedback, and damping. The modules on each unit receive MIDI input, allowing external sequencers to control GuitarBot.

A PID control scheme is used for the bridge positioning subsystem. The control coefficients used in the feedback systems for the pickwheel, bridge positioning system, and damper state can be modified on the fly with MIDI commands.
