= Gold Chains =

American rapper

- Born: Christopher LaFata
- Origin: Reading, Pennsylvania, United States
- Genres: Electro, hip hop/rap
- Instruments: Vocals, synthesizer, drum machine
- Years active: 2001–present
- Labels: Orthlorng Musork, Tigerbeat6, Play It Again Sam, Kill Rock Stars, Gold Club
- Website: www.gold-chains-worldwide.com

Gold Chains is an electro rap musician (born Christopher LaFata) from San Francisco, California. Gold Chains has performed along with Sue Cie (real name Sue Costabile), a video artist also from the San Francisco area.

== Early life ==
LaFata grew up in Reading, Pennsylvania, and attended Trinity College in Hartford, Connecticut, where he earned a degree in cognitive neuroscience. He moved to San Francisco in 1995.

== Career ==
=== Aftermath of the fire: 2015–present ===
A massive four-alarm fire in San Francisco's Mission District left one person dead and six injured. Along with the offices of nearby nonprofit Mission Local, the blaze completely destroyed LaFata's apartment of 18 years, all his belongings and gear, and the studio in which he recorded Gold Chains material.

== Discography ==
- Gold Chains EP (October, 2001, Orthlorng Musork, OTH07)
- Straight from your Radio EP (July 16, 2002, Tigerbeat6, MEOW056)
- Young Miss America (2003, Play It Again Sam)
- When The World Was Our Friend with Sue Cie (October 12, 2004, Kill Rock Stars)
- Sluts (Aug 18, 2013, Gold Club)
