= Kuandu Museum of Fine Arts =

Museum in Beitou, Taipei, Taiwan

- 關渡美術館
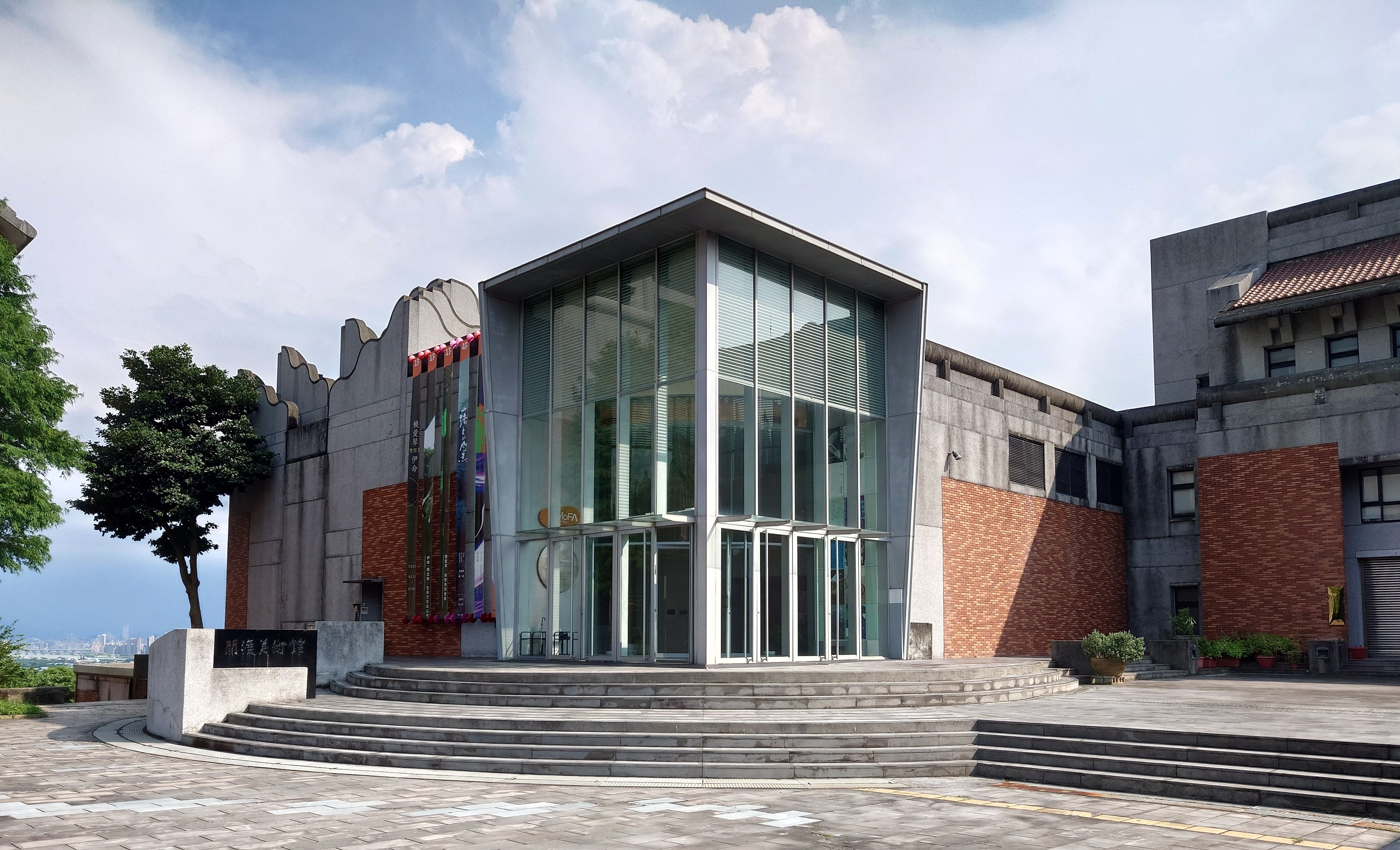
- Established: 2007
- Location: Beitou, Taipei, Taiwan
- Coordinates: 25°08′00″N 121°28′17″E
- Type: museum
- Website: Official website

The Kuandu Museum of Fine Arts (KdMoFA; traditional Chinese: 關渡美術館; simplified Chinese: 关渡美术馆; pinyin: Guāndù Měishùguǎn) is an art museum in the Beitou District, Taipei, Taiwan. The museum is located at the Taipei National University of the Arts.

== History ==
The museum was opened in 2007.

== Architecture ==
The museum is located inside Taipei National University of the Arts. It is housed in a five-story building with a total floor area of 2,380 m^{2}.

== Exhibitions ==
Kuandu Museum of Fine Arts often organizes exhibitions of international artists, including the exhibition "Di-stances", showing the works of the artists Yabuki Takako, Sato Masaharu, Stéphane Pichard, Oh You Kyeong, Manabe Koichi, Lee Sang Won, David Lasnier, Kang Hyun Wook, Ho Hsin-Yi and Chou Yu-Cheng.

== Transportation ==
The museum is accessible by bus from Guandu Station of Taipei Metro.

== See also ==
- List of museums in Taiwan
