= Cycling '74 =

American software development company

- Type: Private
- Industry: Computer software
- Founded: 1997; 29 years ago
- Founder: David Zicarelli
- Headquarters: San Francisco, California, United States
- Area served: Worldwide
- Number of employees: 30
- Parent: Ableton
- Subsidiaries: c74 Music
- Website: www.cycling74.com

Cycling '74 (also known as "C74" and stylized as '74) is an American software development company founded in 1997 by David Zicarelli. It is headquartered in San Francisco, California and is owned by Ableton. The company employs the digital signal processing software tool Max.

== History ==
Cycling '74 (C74) was founded in 1997 by David Zicarelli to serve as the distributor for his various collections of software. The company's name comes relates to its original web design; Zicarelli used images from a 1974 bicycling catalog (see an early archive of the website).

C74 began producing the MSP extension to Opcode Systems's 1990 program "Max" in the mid 1990s, and in 1998 started distributing the products together. As of 2008 there is no longer a version of Max without audio processing.

In June 2017, Ableton announced they had acquired Cycling '74.

== Products ==
=== Max ===
C74 is the distributor and developer of the Max/MSP digital signal processing environment. The company has published the program since 1999, and in 2008 released Max 5, a major overhaul. A Sound on Sound article (August 2008) covered its new software GUI. The new interface was designed using Juce. Aside from re-designed graphics, the development of the new system concentrated on the original code base, and provided integrated documentation and debugging. With the release of Max 5, MSP and Jitter were included in the package.

=== MSP ===
MSP is a DSP plug-in for Max, allowing real-time audio synthesis.

=== Jitter ===
Jitter is a plug-in for Max released in 2003 that allows realtime manipulation of 3D graphics and video.

=== RNBO ===
RNBO is an add-on patching environment in Max that allows users to export patches as portable code that can run in several software and hardware target contexts such as VST3 or Audio Unit plug-ins, as well as Raspberry Pi. RNBO source code can also be integrated into C++ or web audio projects, allowing users to run RNBO patches in the web browser. RNBO was released in 2022.

=== gen~ ===
gen~ is the low-level signal processing core of Max. gen~ encourages users to continue thinking and patching visually, but with the basic building blocks of algorithms. It is an extension of the Max patching environment, specialized for specific domains such as audio (MSP) and matrix and texture processing with Jitter. gen~ also gives users the flexibility to use concise text based expression language (known as "codebox" in Max) rather than the default visual programming language.

=== Pluggo ===
Pluggo was a Max extension that provided capabilities for VST design. Pluggo was required to export Max "patches" for use in digital audio workstation (DAW) host environments, but was discontinued after the release of Max for Live.

=== Max for Live ===
Max was integrated into Ableton Live, developed by Ableton and Cycling ’74, to build unique synths and effects, create algorithmic composition tools, or fuse Live and controller hardware into new music machines. Unlike Pluggo, the device created with Max for Live can be edited directly from Live by pressing the edit button.

== Books ==
=== Step-by-Step: Adventures in Sequencing with Max/MSP ===
"Step-by-Step: Adventures in Sequencing with Max/MSP" is a book written by Gregory Taylor and released by Cycling '74 in 2018. It is about step-based sequencing tools and how to build them using Max. The book aims to demystify and humanize the process of building and iterating upon step-sequencers and patching processes within Max. Cycling '74 also published a Japanese translation of the book.

=== Generating Sound and Organizing Time: Thinking with gen~ Book 1 ===
"Generating Sound & Organizing Time – Thinking with gen~ Book 1" is a book about gen~ written by Graham Wakefield and Gregory Taylor and released by Cycling '74 in 2022. The book aims to encourage working with audio at the sample-by-sample level and demystify digital audio signal processing, as well as provide greater frameworks for thinking about audio in terms of design patterns, techniques, and subcircuits. The book comes with downloadable gen~ patches that go with each example so that readers can hear the results in real time.

== Record Label ==
Founded in 2000, c74 Music was created to release music produced using Cycling '74 technology. The same year, the label released its first record - a live compilation album by the Freight Elevator Quartet. The artist roster is:

- DR.OX
- Amoebazoid
- Gregory Taylor
- Crater
- John Shirley
- Leslie Stuck
- Sarah Peebles
- William Kleinsasser
- Tetsu Inoue and Carl Stone
- Kim Cascone
- Amnon Wolman
- Interface
- The Freight Elevator Quartet
