= SIKART =

Swiss visual arts biographical dictionary

SIKART Lexicon on Art in Switzerland
- Purpose: Online reference work on historical and contemporary art in Switzerland
- Edited by: Swiss Institute for Art Research (SIK-ISEA)
- Located in: Zurich, Switzerland
- Languages: German, French, Italian, English
- Website: www.sikart.ch

SIKART Lexicon on Art in Switzerland is an online encyclopedia of historical and contemporary art in Switzerland. SIKART is published by the Swiss Institute for Art Research (SIK-ISEA), which is headquartered in Zurich.

== Organisation ==
SIKART provides information on artists in the field of the visual arts. This includes basic biographical data as well as details of artists’ fields of activity, exhibitions, publications and awards. Selected entries feature an article providing biographical information, an appraisal of the respective artist’s work as well as a selection of images. SIKART encompasses more than 17,000 personal entries, approximately 1,900 detailed monographic lexicon articles and almost 40 thematic articles about Swiss art history.

In addition to new basic personal entries, new articles by numerous specialists are published under the direction of the scientific SIKART editorial team on an ongoing basis. In the case of contemporary artists, their reception in the art world is decisive for the allocation of an article, whereas new research findings are decisive in the case of historical artists. Lexicon articles are assigned after thorough evaluation based on objective criteria related to public reception: publications, participation in exhibitions, scholarships and awards as well as acquisitions made by institutional collections.

== History ==
The first encyclopaedia of artists published by the Swiss Institute for Art Research appeared in 1981 under the title Lexicon of Contemporary Swiss Artists. In 1991, SIK-ISEA published its first fully computerised publication: Künstlerverzeichnis der Schweiz 1980–1990 (Artists’ Directory of Switzerland 1980–1990 [KVS]). This evolved into the two-volume Biographical Lexicon of Swiss Art (BLSK), which was published in 1998. This standard work contains more than 12,000 brief entries on artists and approximately 1,100 detailed articles that include an illustration of one work as well as further references. The BLSK was the model for SIKART in terms of both concept and content.

SIKART Lexicon on Art in Switzerland was launched online in February 2006. Over the following decade, the user interface was slightly adapted with minor innovations. After extensive preparatory work for the new data modelling of the entire online inventory according to CIDOC CRM standards, SIKART was relaunched in 2021 and has been integrated in the SIK-ISEA research portal since 2023.

== Language versions ==
With branches in Zurich, Lausanne and Lugano, SIKART is based on the principle of territoriality, according to which the language region in which the artists live and work – or lived and worked – is decisive. In addition to articles in German, French and Italian, selected content is also available in English.

== Editing depth ==
From 2006 until March 2023, all lexicon entries were divided into a five-level points system to reflect the public’s reception of the artists ("editing depth"). The editors reacted to the fact that this visualisation of reception was repeatedly misunderstood as an editorial "rating" by dispensing with the indication of editing depths.

== Funding ==
SIKART is funded by the Swiss Confederation, the Swiss cantons, the city of Zurich and private donors. The website can be accessed free of charge, but at launch SIK-ISEA intended to charge for access at a later date so as to enable SIKART to operate independently of public funding.

== Printed publications ==
- Schweizerisches Institut für Kunstwissenschaft (ed.): Biografisches Lexikon der Schweizer Kunst, unter Einschluss des Fürstentums Liechtenstein. Dictionnaire biographique de l’art suisse, Principauté du Liechtenstein incluse. Dizionario biografico dell’arte svizzera, Principato del Liechtenstein incluso, 2 volumes + CD-ROM, Zurich: SIK-ISEA/Zurich: Verlag Neue Zürcher Zeitung, 1998, ISBN 3-85823-673-X
- Schweizerisches Institut für Kunstwissenschaft (ed.): Künstlerverzeichnis der Schweiz, 1980–1990: unter Einschluss des Fürstentums Liechtenstein. Répertoire des artistes suisses, 1980–1990: la Principauté du Liechtenstein inclus. Dizionario degli artisti svizzeri, 1980–1990: incluso il Principato di Liechtenstein, Zurich: SIK-ISEA/Frauenfeld: Huber, 1991, ISBN 3-7193-1045-0
- Schweizerisches Institut für Kunstwissenschaft (ed.): Lexikon der zeitgenössischen Schweizer Künstler. Dictionnaire des artistes suisses contemporains. Catalogo degli artisti svizzeri contemporanei, Zurich: SIK-ISEA/Frauenfeld: Huber, 1981, ISBN 3-7193-0765-4

== Bibliography ==
- Hans-Jörg Heusser, Juerg Albrecht et al.: Kunst und Wissenschaft: das Schweizerische Institut für Kunstwissenschaft 1951–2010, Zurich: SIK-ISEA, 2010, ISBN 978-3-908196-75-4/978-3-85881-322-0
