= Kit Clayton =

American musician and computer programmer

- Education: Wesleyan University
- Occupations: Digital and electronic musician, computer programmer
- Known for: Founder, Cycling '74 and Orthlorng Musork
- Website: Kit Clayton's personal site

Joshua Kit Clayton, better known by his stage name Kit Clayton, is a San Francisco-based electronic and digital musician and computer programmer. He is a developer at San Francisco software company Cycling '74, helping create the Max/MSP MIDI/audio programming environment. He is also a significant contributor to Jitter, the multi-dimensional data set processing and visualizing architecture for audio, video, and 3D graphics (part of the Max multimedia package). Clayton uses Max, MSP, and Jitter extensively in his own abstract musical compositions, which have been described as including aspects of ambient computer music and glitch.

In 2000 Clayton founded and operated his own label, Orthlorng Musork. Musork released seminal works by AGF, Akira Rabelais, Alejandra and Aeron, Kevin Blechdom, Blevin Blectum, Blectum from Blechdom, Eight Frozen Modules, Gold Chains, Secret Mommy, Stephan Mathieu, Sutekh, Timeblind, and others, until closing in 2004. Musork announced its final release and the closing of label operations with the following statement:

"Why do we stop? The simple and honest truth is that we want to devote our time to other creative things. We still love music and we will still be active and supportive of the scene. We aren't in financial ruin, we don't think p2p networks have destroyed the music industry, we don't only want to listen to country western, we just want to take on other projects with as much love and intensity as we did this one."

He continues to compose, perform and develop Max/MSP, and Jitter.

Clayton graduated from Wesleyan University, where he studied electronic music and computer science.
