= League of Electronic Musical Urban Robots =

The League of Electronic Musical Urban Robots, or LEMUR, was a Brooklyn-based group of artists and technologists developing robotic musical instruments. Founded in 2000 by musician and engineer Eric Singer, LEMUR's philosophy was to build robotic instruments that play themselves. In LEMUR designs, the robots are the instruments.

LEMUR was supported in part by grants from the Rockefeller Foundation, the New York State Council on the Arts (NYSCA), the Greenwall Foundation, the Jerome Foundation, Arts International and Harvestworks Digital Media Arts Center.

Other LEMUR members included R. Luke DuBois and Michael Hearst. Musical artists who have utilized LEMUR include; Todd Reynolds, Mari Kimura, Lee Ranaldo, Morton Subotnick and They Might Be Giants.

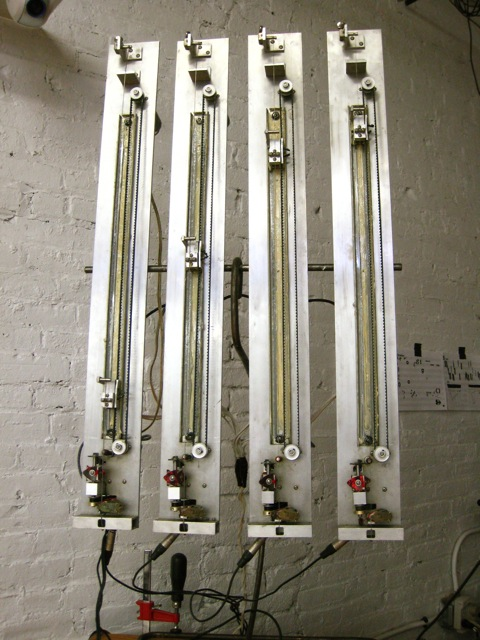
Guitarbot at LEMUR musical robots lab in Brooklyn

== LEMUR Instruments ==
Guitarbot is four independently controllable stringed units which can pick and slide extremely rapidly. !rBot (pronounced chick-r-bot) is inspired by the human mouth, its cavity opens to play a Peruvian goat-hoof rattle. TibetBot is designed around three Tibetan singing bowls, which are struck by six robotic arms. ForestBot is 25 egg rattles sprouting from 10-foot rods. ModBots are miniature modular percussion robots.
