= Museum Art.Plus =

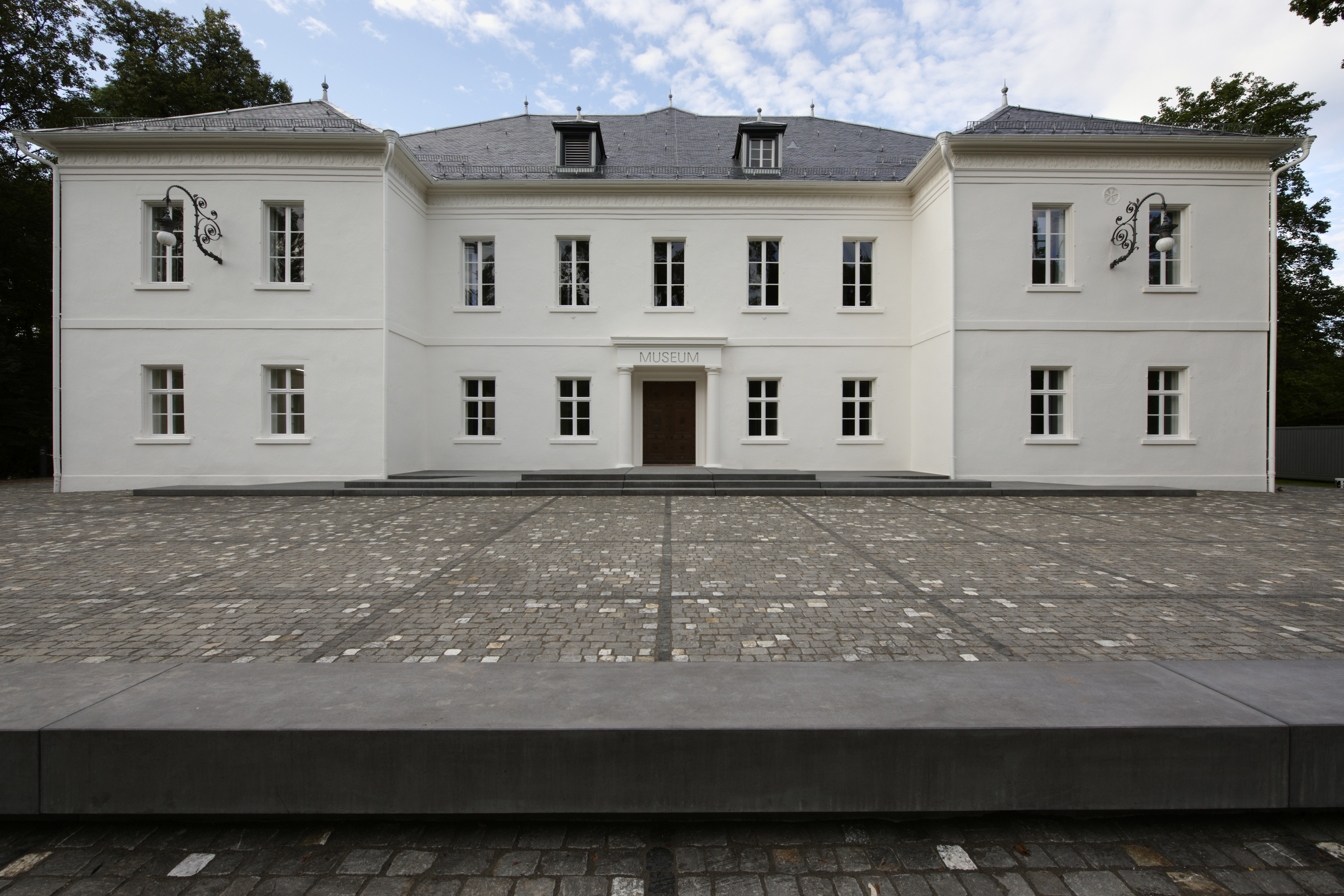

- Location within Baden-Württemberg Location within Germany
- Former name: Museum Biedermann
- Established: 2009
- Location: Donaueschingen, Germany
- Coordinates: 47°57′1.9″N 8°30′7.3″E
- Type: Art museum
- Website: museum-art-plus.com

Museum Art.Plus (renamed in 2015, previously Museum Biedermann) is a museum devoted to exhibitions of contemporary art in Donaueschingen, Germany. The museum opened in 2009.

== Building ==
The two-story Neoclassicism building was built in 1841 by the Donaueschingen Museum Society with financial support from Prince Karl Egon II. In addition to exhibitions, the building hosted readings, concerts and balls. Gutted by a fire in 1845, it was rebuilt two years later. During the World War I it provided lodgings for reservists and infantrymen. After the war, the Museum Society did not reclaim the building. In the 1930s it became a recreational facility (Kurhaus) and later a cinema. A second screen was installed in 1957. The cinemas operated until 2006. Renovation and refurbishment of the building started in 2008, and the works were completed the year after. The museum opened in September 2009 with its first exhibition.

== Concept ==
Museum Art.Plus focuses on contemporary art. In addition and parallel to a large annual group exhibition, it presents three smaller (solo) exhibitions. Showcasing a wide range of current artistic practices, the museum not only offers a varied insight into the international contemporary art scene, it also actively promotes outstanding regional artists.

The topics for the exhibitions will be developed in collaboration with both private and public art collections. Set apart from the fast pace of the contemporary art scene and with its programme of exhibitions and complementary events, Museum Art.Plus offers its visitors, both from the region and beyond, an attractive location for cultural encounters.

== Publications (selection) ==
- "British Art+". modo Verlag, Freiburg i.B. 2014, ISBN 978-3-86833-156-1. (exhibition catalogue)
- "Senza Titolo". modo Verlag, Freiburg i.B. 2012, ISBN 978-3-86833-107-3. (exhibition catalogue)
- Back to the Roots. modo Verlag, Freiburg i.B. 2011, ISBN 978-3-86833-070-0. (exhibition catalogue)
- Metall:Werke/Metal:Works. modo Verlag, Freiburg i.B. 2010, ISBN 978-3-86833-059-5. (exhibition catalogue)
- Auf:bruch/Departure. 4 Positionen zeitgenössischer Kunst. modo Verlag, Freiburg i.B. 2010, ISBN 978-3-86833-044-1. (exhibition catalogue)
- Selection. Einblicke in die Sammlung Biedermann. modo Verlag, Freiburg i.B. 2009, ISBN 978-3-86833-036-6. (exhibition catalogue)
