= The Union and Advertiser =

Former newspaper in Rochester, New York

Rochester Daily Union and Advertiser of April 15, 1865

The Union and Advertiser, also known as the Daily Union and Advertiser, was a newspaper in Rochester, New York. It was published by Curtis, Butts & Co. from 1856 until at least 1886. For at least part of its history it was a daily. Several volumes are part of the Library of Congress' collection. It was succeeded in 1918 by the Rochester Times-Union.

Papers it competed with over the years included the Rochester Democrat and Chronicle.

== History ==
The Rochester Daily Advertiser was published by Luther Tucker, its first issue being 25 October 1826. It was the first daily paper published west of Albany. In 1855 the Daily Union was established as an afternoon competitor to the Advertiser. Within a year it was purchased by John E. Morey and consolidated with the Advertiser, creating the Union and Advertiser. In 1918 Frank Gannett purchased both the Union and Advertiser and the Evening Times, another daily, and merged the two to create the Times-Union, which was published daily until 1997.

The New York Times reported on the paper's American Civil War era coverage in 1863.

The paper covered the National Convention of Spiritualists in Rochester August 26–28, 1868.

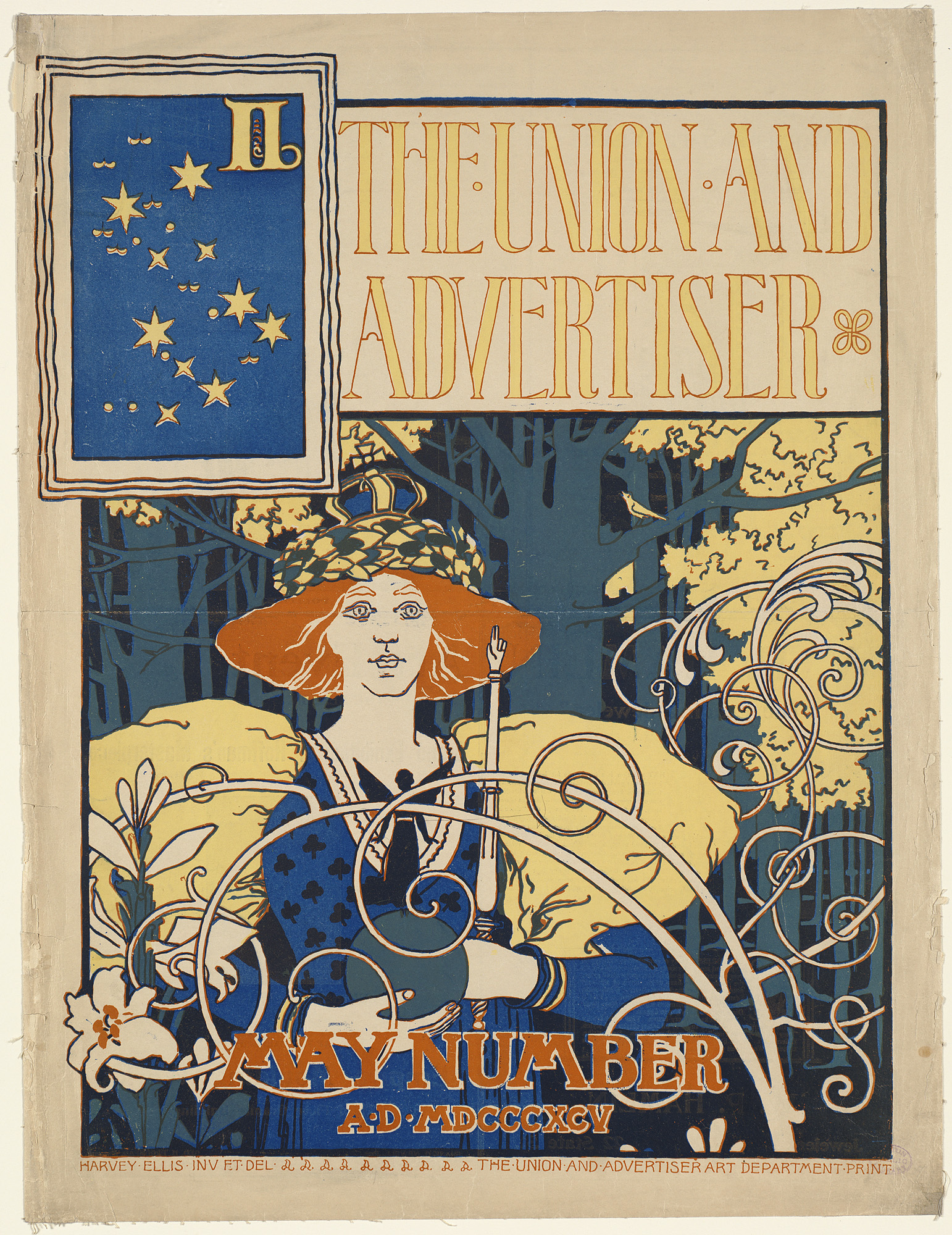
The Union and Advertiser, May 1895 advertising poster by Harvey Ellis

Artist Harvey Ellis had a work published in the paper in 1895. It is now held by the Boston Public Library.

In 1888, the offices of the Union and Advertiser moved into the H.H. Warner Building on Exchange Street.

In 1908, the Union and Advertiser press was used to publish a publication on the origin and development of Rochester's park system.

March 9, 1911 the paper ran an obituary on William Webster, landscape artist at the Glen Iris Estate, home to the William Pryor Letchworth's residence that became the Glen Iris Inn and the land that is now part of Letchworth State Park.
