= Glacial geology of the Genesee River =

The Genesee River flows northward from its source in northern Pennsylvania to enter Lake Ontario at Rochester, New York.

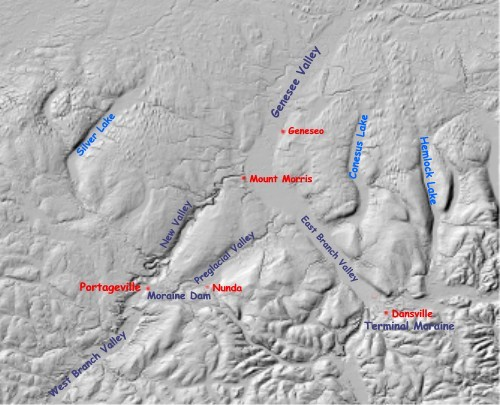
Genesee River Middle Section Near Mount Morris Showing Glacial Changes in Valleys

The present river valley has been modified extensively from preglacial river valleys. A lobe of the last glacier (Wisconsonian) pushed southward almost to the Pennsylvania line, dramatically reshaping the drainage patterns of central and western New York.

== Middle Genesee ==
The first image shows the evidence of the glacial rerouting for the middle section of the Genesee. The original river had two branches. The east branch runs southeast of Mount Morris. It was much larger than the west branch, flowing from near present-day Canisteo, New York to empty into the preglacial Ontario River (now lake) north of Rochester. The headwaters of the east branch were blocked and diverted southward into the present Susquehanna River system by huge glacial terminal moraines just south of Dansville. The entire old valley was buried in that area. This left only the small Canaseraga Creek, to flow in the remnant of the large ancient east branch valley from Dansville to Mount Morris.

The current upper Genesee (above Mount Morris) was only the west branch in preglacial times, a tributary river to the original. This branch, which entered the old valley was also dammed in the Nunda area by moraines. A lake was formed with varve clay sediments visible along the valley sides in many spots, but the lake drained as the river found a way to cut a new valley northeastward from Portageville a little west of the original valley, then drop back into the old valley at Mount Morris. This section of new valley is a spectacular gorge with three scenic waterfalls, that is now the site of Letchworth State Park.

Portions of other preglacial valleys can be seen both east and west of the Genesee, occupied now by lakes. The remnants of these valleys were buried by glacial drift. A drumlin field can be seen just north of Conesus and Hemlock Lakes.

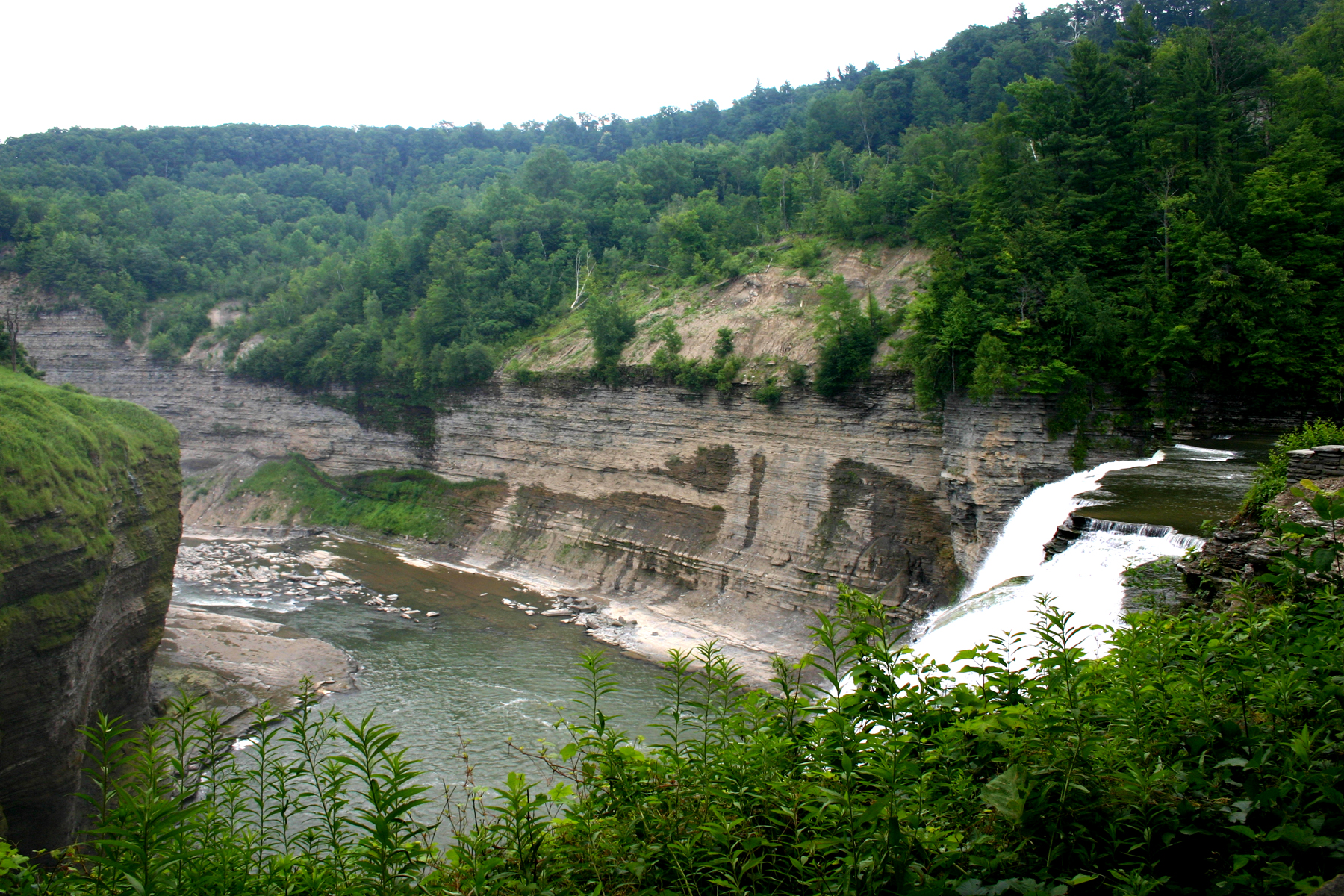
Middle Falls and the Devonian rock gorge of the Genesee River at Letchworth State Park

== Lower Genesee ==
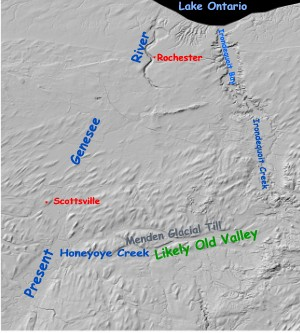

Genesee River Lower Section
Near Rochester
Showing Glacial Changes in Valleys

In the lower part of the river, before entering Lake Ontario, the river appears to have been diverted once again from its ancient valley by the glacier. The original valley is thought to be that of Irondequoit Creek and Bay. The second image shows the most likely (buried) westward path originally followed by the river. With this blocked, the river cut a new channel, and created three waterfalls where it crossed limestone escarpments.
