= Letchworth Village =

New York residential care for disabled (1911–1996)

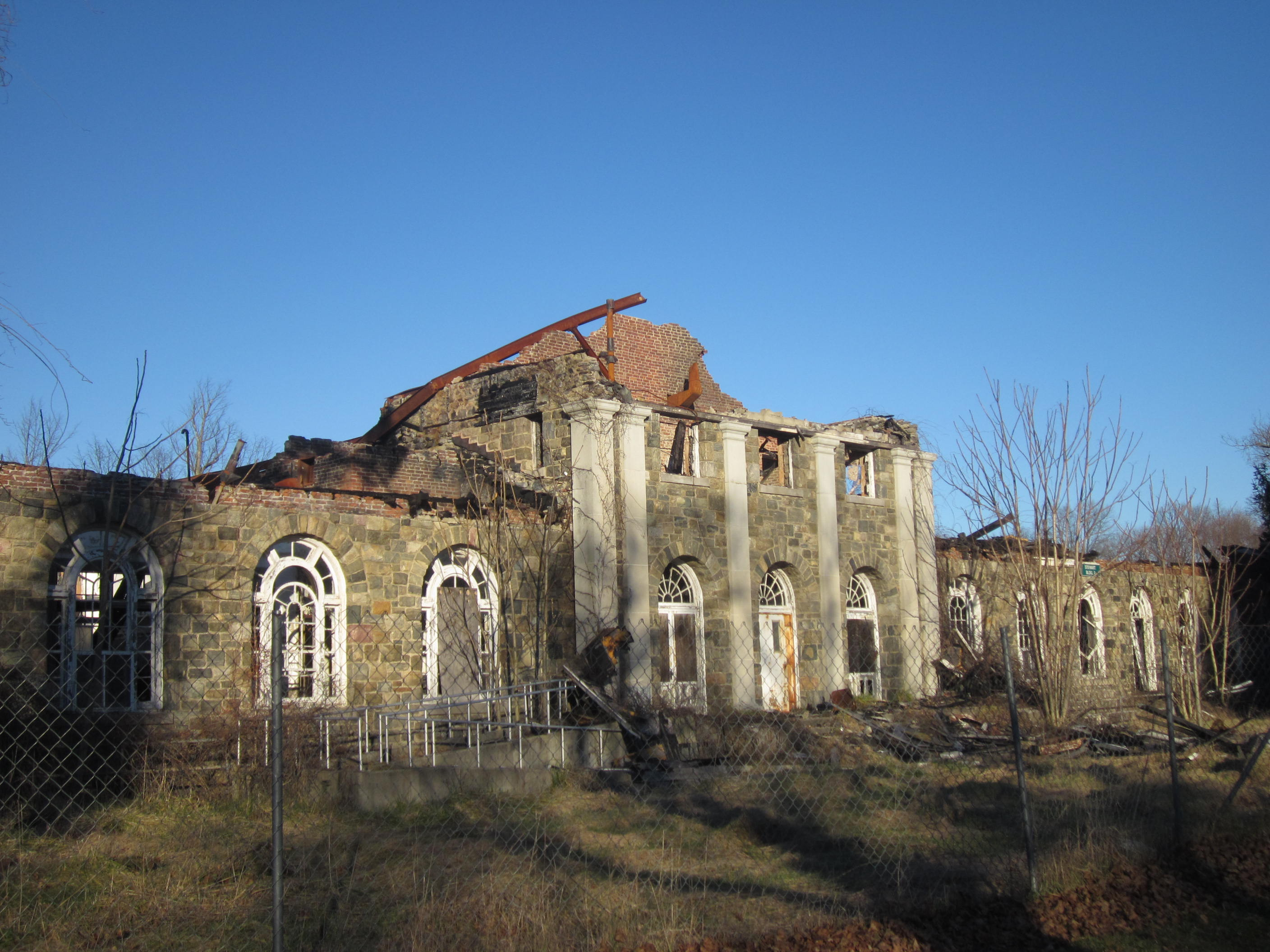
- Letchworth Village building, December 2011

Geography
- Location: Rockland County, New York, United States
- Coordinates: 41.214793°N 74.023676°W

Organization
- Type: psychiatric hospital

History
- Opened: 1911
- Closed: 1996

Links
- Lists: Hospitals in New York State

Letchworth Village was a residential institution located in Rockland County, New York, in the hamlet of Thiells built for the physically and mentally disabled of all ages, from the newborn to the elderly. Opened in 1911, Letchworth Village at its peak consisted of over 130 buildings spread out over many acres of land. It was named for William Pryor Letchworth, who espoused reform in the treatment and care of the insane, epileptics, and poor children.

Reports of inadequate funding and improper care of the residents, including children, were present dating back to the 1920s. Accounts surfaced of residents being found unclothed, unbathed, and neglected. In addition to rampant abuse among the institution's residents, staff also suffered abuse at the hands of co-workers, which included incidents of rape. The institution gained national attention in 1972 from an exposé by Geraldo Rivera.

In 1996 the institution was permanently closed, and many of its abandoned structures have since fallen into serious disrepair.

== Opening and beginning years ==
By the end of 1911, the first phase of construction had completed on the 2,362-acre "state institution for the segregation of the epileptic and feeble-minded." With architecture modeled after Monticello, the picturesque community was lauded as a model institution for the treatment of the developmentally disabled, a humane alternative to high-rise asylums, having been founded on several guiding principles that were revolutionary at the time. Separate living and training facilities for children, able-bodied adults, and the infirm were not to exceed two stories or house over 70 inmates. Until the 1960s, the able-bodied labored on communal farms, raising enough food and livestock to feed the entire population.

It was conceived by the progressives of the time as a major departure from the almshouses of the 19th century. The facility was thought to have had great potential and was a great improvement from past facilities. It was a farming village of nearly four square miles, In the words of the 1927 Rockland County Red Book, "subdivided as far as possible in order to avoid the tendency toward institutionalism." The grounds surrounding the buildings were very plentiful and created much leisure space for patients. As late as 1958, the patients grew their own crops and tended cows, pigs and chickens. They made toys and sold them at Christmas.

== Polio vaccination ==
In February 1950, while Letchworth still enjoyed a good reputation amongst health professionals (despite rumors of overcrowding and maltreatment), Letchworth's Dr. George Jervis asked Dr. Hilary Koprowski to test his live-virus polio vaccine at Letchworth Village to compare it to the alternatives available then. Dr. Koprowski had tested the oral vaccine on himself and a laboratory assistant two years earlier. At Letchworth Village, he gave a dose to an 8-year-old boy. When he experienced no side effects, the vaccine was administered to 19 more child patients, none of whom are known to have experienced any side effects. In fact, blood tests showed that 17 gained antibodies (3 already had them). Koprowski viewed these experiments as a positive first step toward a better polio vaccine.

== Structures and buildings ==
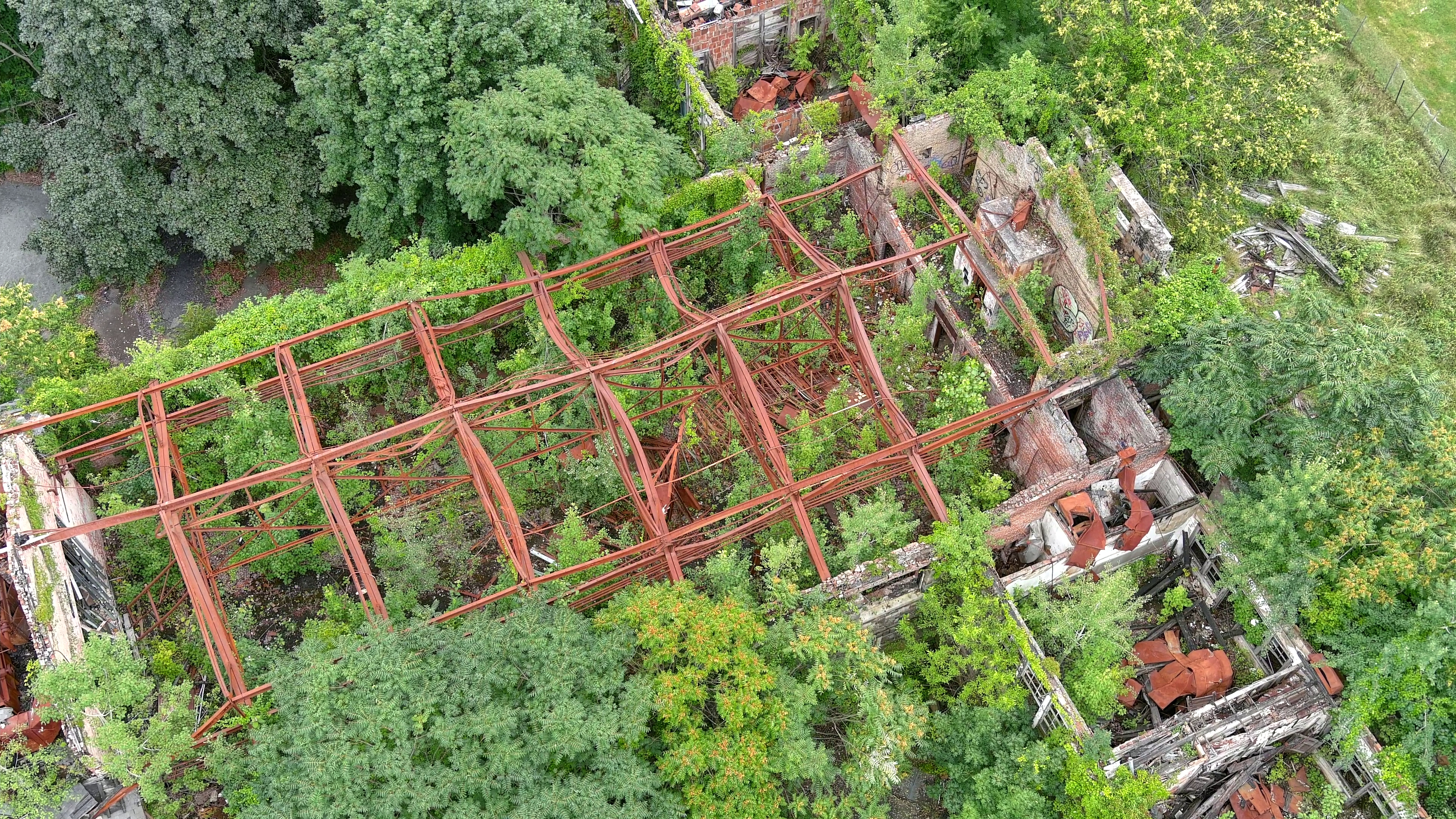
Aerial view of the Stewart Hall boys' dormitory at Letchworth Village in July 2021

Letchworth opened in 1911 to care for mentally handicapped individuals. The village's fieldstone, neoclassic buildings consisted of small dormitories, a hospital, dining halls, and housing for the staff. It was built on thousands of acres of countryside and woodland.

In accordance with guidelines set by William Pryor Letchworth while the institution was being planned, the buildings that were originally designated as dormitories were mostly single-story, and at the most two-story buildings, designed to house from 16 to 70 residents in total per building, and subdivided into smaller dormitories. The dormitory buildings were required to be at least 200 feet from other buildings, and each had to have its own attached playground.

Each playground had, at a minimum, a basketball court. Most of the basketball courts are still minimally maintained (that is, they have nets) and are available for public use as of August 2021. A few of the playgrounds also have remnants of other play equipment that has since been removed.

These guidelines were rigidly adhered to at least as late as 1933. By 1944, however, overcrowding had resulted in residents being housed in buildings that were not originally designed nor intended to be used as dormitories. The overcrowding was partially a result of the then newly-constructed Willowbrook State School in Staten Island, New York, which had been built to relieve overcrowding at Letchworth and other state institutions, being turned over to the United States Army during World War II before it accepted any of its originally-intended patients.

Letchworth Village was closed in 1996 and most of the structures are derelict. The roof of the administrative building bears the name of Dr. Charles Little, the first superintendent of Letchworth. Many of the buildings and structures have been vandalized and even some burned down as an act of arson. Some main structures still remain.

== Old Cemetery ==
From 1914 through 1967, residents who died at Letchworth Village and whose remains were not claimed by their families were buried at a clearing in the forest a short distance off Call Hollow Road in Stony Point, New York, about a mile away from the 2,000-acre main facility campus, and hidden from the road by trees. The cemetery is presently owned and maintained by the town of Stony Point, along with volunteers from the community.

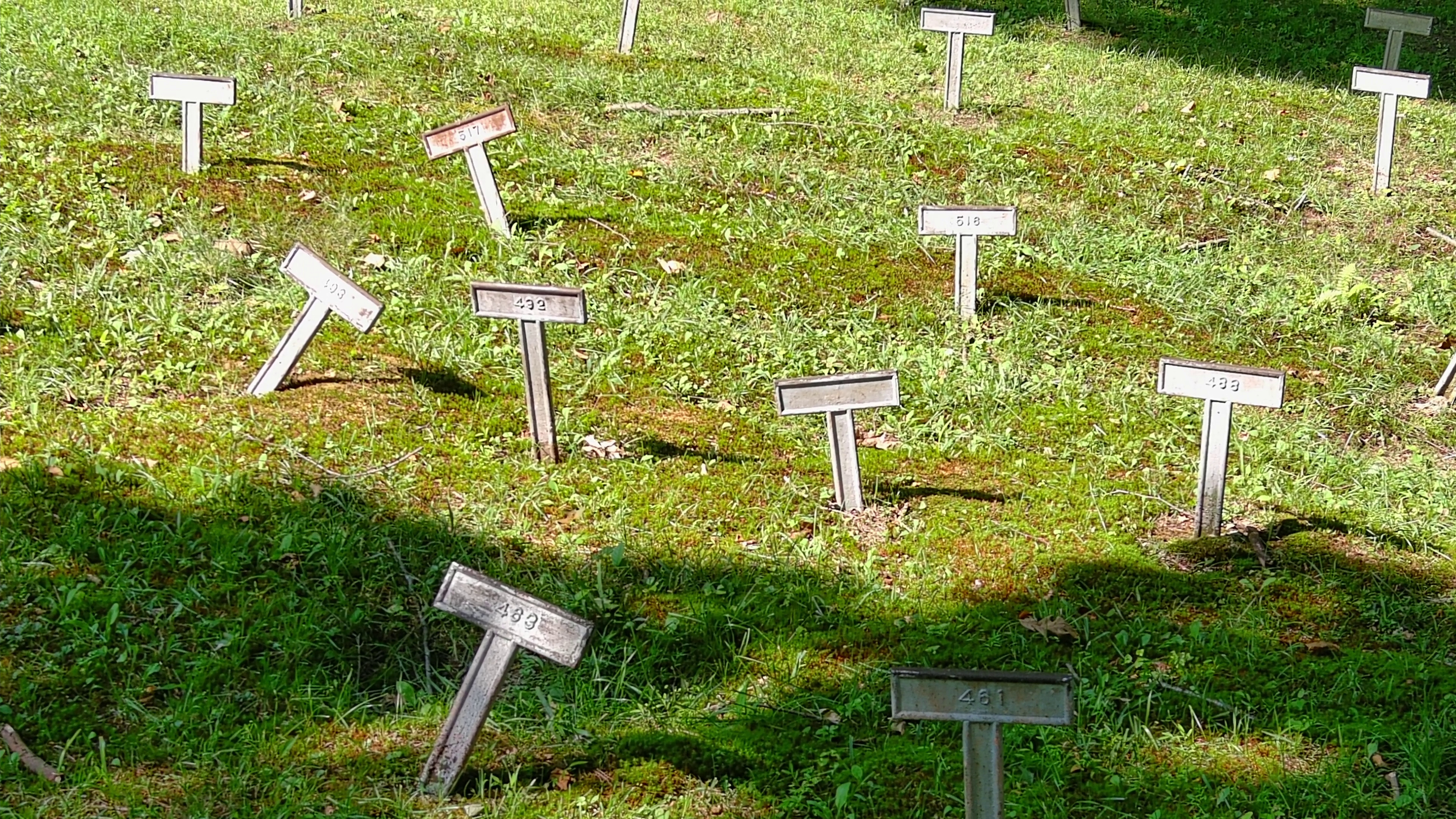
Numbered steel grave markers at the original Letchworth Village cemetery

The decedents' graves were marked only with T-shaped, numbered steel markers. Families were allowed to erect headstones at their own expense, but as of this edit in August 2021, most of the graves are still marked only by the numbered steel markers.

Remarkably few of the markers or stones have been vandalized. On the contrary, some of the graves, especially those of children, are regularly visited by members of the community who leave stones, flowers, or other items in remembrance of the deceased.

There also is a large memorial stone at the entrance of the cemetery, erected in 2007, with a plaque bearing the names of those buried there. The names are not keyed to the numbered graves. Many stones, small toys, and other items are left on the stone in remembrance of those buried there.

In 1967, a new cemetery was opened near Thiells Mount Ivy Road in Thiells, New York. The bodies of those buried at the old cemetery were not moved.

== Conditions and treatment ==
Letchworth was described as an ideal center for the mentally challenged and praised by the state at first. Yet rumors such as the mistreatment of patients and horrific experimenting continued to circulate long after its closing. Former worker Dr. Little presented in an annual report in 1921 that there were three categories of "feeble-mindedness": the "moron" group, the "imbecile" group, and the "idiot" group. The last of these categories is the one that could not be trained, Dr. Little said, and so they should not be taken into Letchworth Village, because they were unable to "benefit the state" by doing the various jobs that were assigned to the male patients, included loading thousands of tons of coal into storage facilities, building roads, and farming acres of land.

Many of the patients were young children. In 1921, the 13th Annual Report lists the number of patients admitted that year. Out of 506 people, 317 were between the ages of 5 and 16, and 11 were under the age of 5 years. Visitors observed that the children were malnourished and looked sick. The Letchworth staff claimed in the report that there was a scarcity of food, water, and other necessary supplies, but that was not the case. Children were often the subjects of testing and some of the cruelest neglect. Many of the children were able to comprehend learning but were not given the chance because they were thought of as "different."

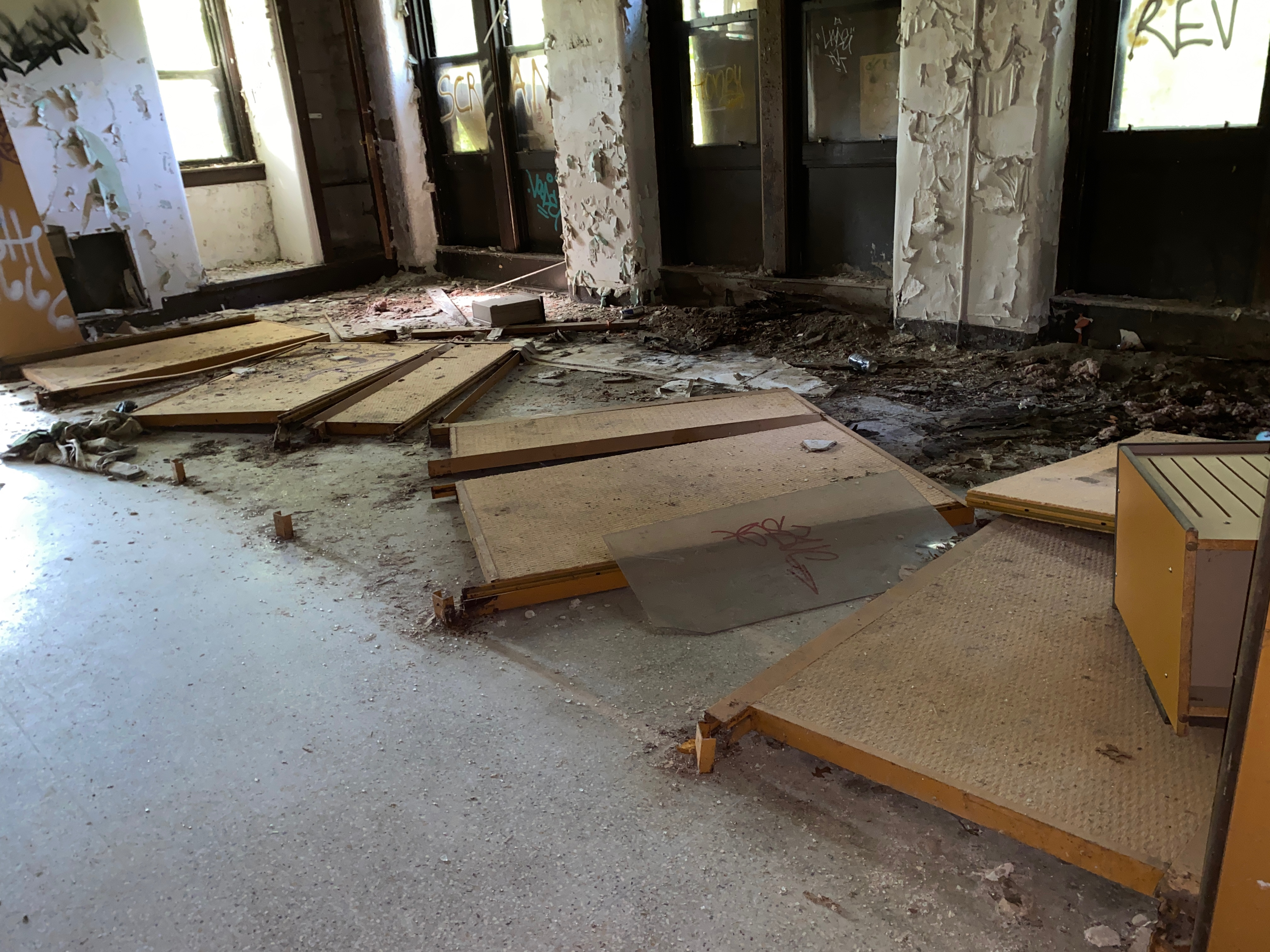
A former girls' dormitory at Letchworth Village, photographed in August 2021.

Patients were forced to dwell in cramped dormitories because the state would not complete the construction of more buildings. Barely ten years after being constructed, Letchworth's buildings were already overpopulated, 70 beds being crammed into the tiny dormitories. Nearly 1,200 patients were present during 1921. Overpopulation was one of the harshest conditions at Letchworth.

By the 1950s, the Village was overflowing with 4,000 inhabitants. Quoting a spokesman for the State Office of Mental Retardation and Developmental Disabilities, Corcoran confirmed that families abandoned their relatives there. Families of patients seemed to be just as neglectful as caregivers of the facility.

In the 1940s, Irving Haberman did a set of photographs which revealed the true nature of what was going on. Until this point, the conditions of the facility weren't apparent to the public. Haberman's photos exposed the terrible conditions of the facilities as well as the dirty, unkempt patients. Naked residents huddled in sterile day rooms. The photos showed the patients to be highly neglected. These photos pushed the public to question the institution and demand answers. Haberman knew that these photos would bring attention to the Letchworth facility.

=== Geraldo Rivera investigation ===
In 1972, ABC News featured Letchworth Village in its piece "Willowbrook: The Last Great Disgrace". The documentary, by ABC New York's investigative reporter Geraldo Rivera, looked at how intellectually disabled people, particularly children, were being treated in the State of New York.

United States Senator Robert F. Kennedy previously had toured the Willowbrook facility in 1965 and called it a "snake pit." Kennedy was not allowed to take cameras into the buildings, however, so the average citizen had no idea how bad the conditions inside Willowbrook actually were. Kennedy's speeches about the conditions there, although impassioned, attracted little attention and resulted in little or no improvement in conditions at the facility.

Rivera, on the other hand, arrived at Willowbrook with a full camera crew, and when the documentary was aired, there was widespread outrage at how the residents at Willowbrook, many of them children, were being mistreated.

Although Rivera's documentary focused on the Willowbrook State School on Staten Island, Rivera also visited Letchworth Village, as well as facilities in California. While he found that a great deal of progress had been made in the caring for, and training of, disabled people in California, he saw the situation in New York's facilities as backward and cruel.

Rivera accompanied Bronx congressman Mario Biaggi to Letchworth Village, arriving two hours early because Rivera correctly suspected that the staff would be ordered to clean and dress the children before the camera crew arrived. Biaggi described the children there as being subjected to "[the] worst possible conditions I've ever seen in my life".

The documentary showed the residents of Willowbrook and Letchworth Village, many of them children, living in awful, dirty and overcrowded conditions, with a lack of clothing, bathing, and attention to their most basic needs. The facilities were incredibly understaffed, and there was little or no actual schooling, training, or even simple activities to keep residents occupied.

Rivera saw the overcrowding and neglect as a direct result of inadequate funding and the ignorant attitudes in wider society. The potential of individual patients was far from being realized. This confronting report helped lead to far-reaching reform of disability services throughout the United States.

=== Later reforms and attrition ===
The attention, however, did little for the immediate needs of those living at Letchworth Village. The institution remained inadequately funded and managed, but public pressure led to reforms by the end of the 1970s. Funding levels were significantly raised focused mostly on those who worked in direct care. Various efforts to reduce overcrowding were underway by late 1978 and to increase privacy for individuals in the living areas. Simultaneously, the Office of Mental Retardation and Developmental Disabilities attempted to obtain group homes. Opposition was strong on the parts of many local residents - who attended Town Hall Meetings to express their fears. Letchworth had already initiated learning programs that were designed to train individuals in the skills with hopes of making their transitions easier. Coupled with other, community-based options such as "Family Care" homes, the population of the Village steadily decreased throughout the '80s and '90s. Old-age-related attrition played a part.

== Closing ==
Letchworth was closed in 1996, leaving the buildings to decay. Many who worked at the Village refuse to speak of their experiences. Old societal methods of segregating people with disabilities ended with the push for mainstreaming and inclusion into society. Patients were moved to more up-to-date facilities in the county.

== Redevelopment ideas ==
The Town of Stony Point is interested in redeveloping part of the town-owned former Letchworth Village property, currently called the Patriot Hills Complex. The 159-acre complex off Willow Grove Road includes the Patriot Hills Golf Course and the Veterans Memorial Park. The town's interest is to develop the 18-acre portion of the property that houses eight remaining buildings that were built between 1929 and 1952 for the Letchworth Village Developmental Center campus. Five of them are vacant, and the rest have been renovated and have been in use. According to the town's 20-page Request for Expressions of Interest (RFEI) document, respondents may or may not include the existing buildings in their proposals. In 2003, the town commissioned a community survey regarding reuse of the Letchworth property. The results showed that about 71 percent were in favor of the town partnering with private parties to jointly develop the site for a combination of municipal recreational facilities as well as private uses to offset development costs. In 2009, the town hired a developmental consultant to look for a potential developer, and a plan to build a stadium with hotels, a conference center and shopping mall was proposed. But the idea died as residents were worried that they might lose the Little League fields at the Veterans Memorial Park.

== In popular culture ==
- Letchworth Village featured as a key setting in a scene on the TV series Elementary in the season 3 episode 14 entitled "The Female of Species" which originally aired on February 12, 2015.
- Zak Bagans, Aaron Goodwin and Nick Groff, of Ghost Adventures, explored and investigated the place, in the season 5, episode 6, entitled "Letchworth Village", which originally on October 28, 2011.
