= Genesee Falls, New York =

- Town
- Location within Wyoming County and New York

- Location within the state of New York
- Coordinates: 42°33′53″N 78°3′33″W
- Country: United States
- State: New York
- County: Wyoming

Area
  - Total: 15.70 sq mi (40.66 km^{2})
  - Land: 15.61 sq mi (40.44 km^{2})
  - Water: 0.085 sq mi (0.22 km^{2})
- Elevation: 1,434 ft (437 m)

Population (2010)
  - Total: 438
  - Estimate (2016): 423
  - Density: 27.1/sq mi (10.46/km^{2})
- Time zone: UTC-5 (Eastern (EST))
  - Summer (DST): UTC-4 (EDT)
- FIPS code: 36-28596
- GNIS feature ID: 0978990

Genesee Falls is an incorporated town in Wyoming County, New York. The population was 438 at the 2010 census.

The Town of Genesee Falls is in the southeastern corner of the county.

== History ==
The Town of Genesee Falls was established in 1846. The town was created from part of the Town of Pike and from part of the Town of Portage in Livingston County, New York.

In 1876 a violent tornado struck Portageville, destroying buildings and injuring inhabitants.

== Geography ==
According to the United States Census Bureau, the town has a total area of 15.7 square miles (41 km^{2}), of which 15.5 square miles (40 km^{2}) is land and 0.2 square miles (0.52 km^{2}) (1.08%) is water.

The east town line is the border of Livingston County, New York (Town of Portage). The south town line is the border of Allegany County New York (Town of Hume).

== Demographics ==
Historical population
Census	Pop.	Note	%±
1850	1,322		—
1860	1,020		−22.8%
1870	979		−4.0%
1880	860		−12.2%
1890	740		−14.0%
1900	658		−11.1%
1910	615		−6.5%
1920	542		−11.9%
1930	509		−6.1%
1940	413		−18.9%
1950	436		5.6%
1960	397		−8.9%
1970	397		0.0%
1980	553		39.3%
1990	488		−11.8%
2000	460		−5.7%
2010	438		−4.8%
2016 (est.)	423		−3.4%
U.S. Decennial Census

As of the census of 2000, there were 460 people, 170 households, and 126 families residing in the town. The population density was 29.6 inhabitants per square mile (11.4/km^{2}). There were 194 housing units at an average density of 12.5 per square mile (4.8/km^{2}). The racial makeup of the town was 97.17% White, 0.43% African American, 0.22% Native American, 0.22% Asian, 0.22% from other races, and 1.74% from two or more races. Hispanic or Latino of any race were 0.65% of the population.

There were 170 households, out of which 37.6% had children under the age of 18 living with them, 56.5% were married couples living together, 15.9% had a female householder with no husband present, and 25.3% were non-families. 18.2% of all households were made up of individuals, and 7.6% had someone living alone who was 65 years of age or older. The average household size was 2.71 and the average family size was 3.06.

In the town, the population was spread out, with 29.3% under the age of 18, 5.7% from 18 to 24, 33.5% from 25 to 44, 17.8% from 45 to 64, and 13.7% who were 65 years of age or older. The median age was 36 years. For every 100 females, there were 95.7 males. For every 100 females age 18 and over, there were 91.2 males.

The median income for a household in the town was $30,250, and the median income for a family was $38,571. Males had a median income of $27,813 versus $25,938 for females. The per capita income for the town was $15,080. About 17.5% of families and 20.9% of the population were below the poverty line, including 31.7% of those under age 18 and 4.8% of those age 65 or over.

== Communities and locations in the Town of Genesee Falls ==
- Bigelow Corners – A location in the northwest part of the town.
- Bishop Corners – A location in the northeast part of the town.
- Genesee River – The river is the east border of the town.
- Letchworth State Park – The south end of the state park is in this town.
- Portageville – The hamlet of Portageville, on Route 19A, is the only community in the town.
