= Portage Falls =

Waterfalls in New York State

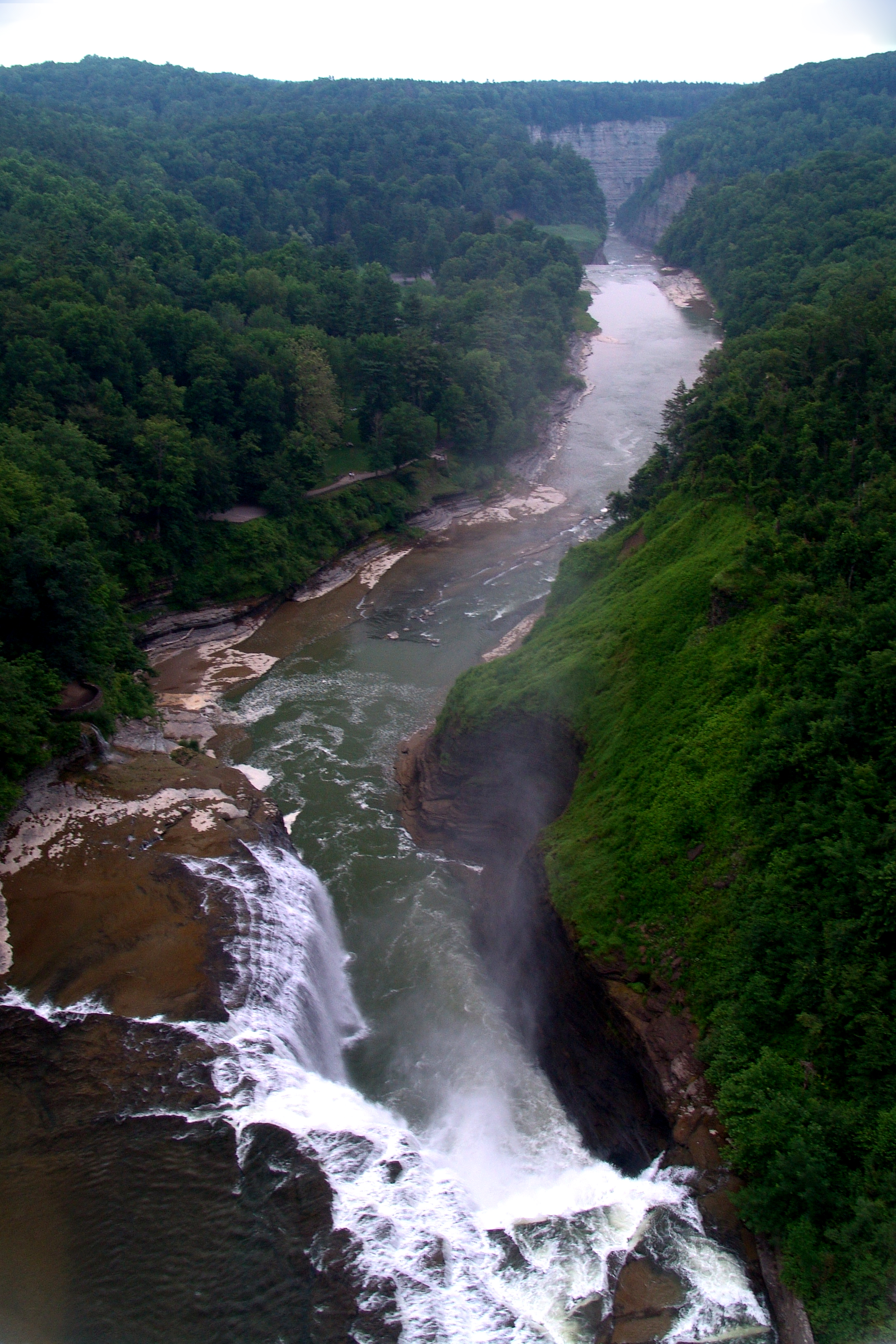
View from the Portage Viaduct

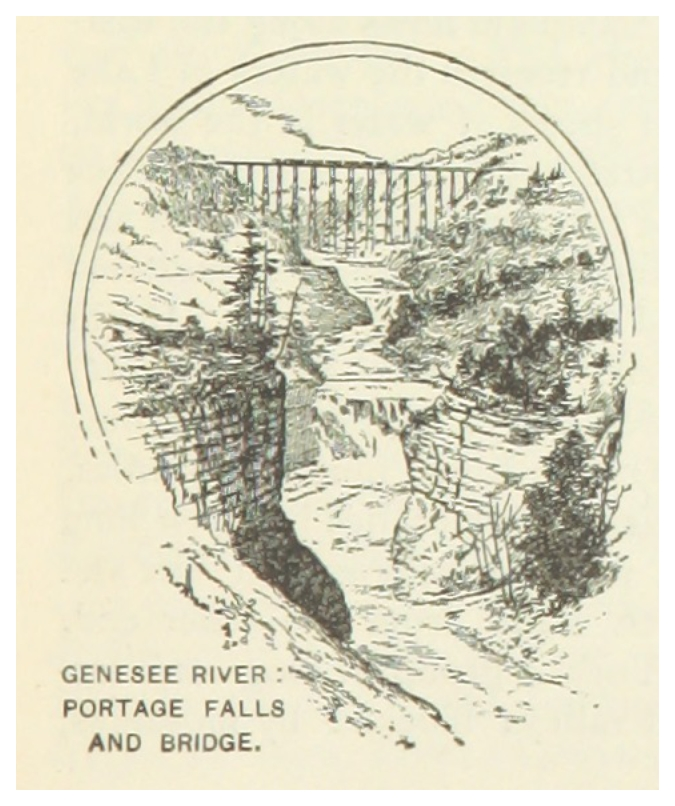
Etching of the falls and Portage Bridge from Moses Forster Sweetser's King's Hand-book of the United States, 1891

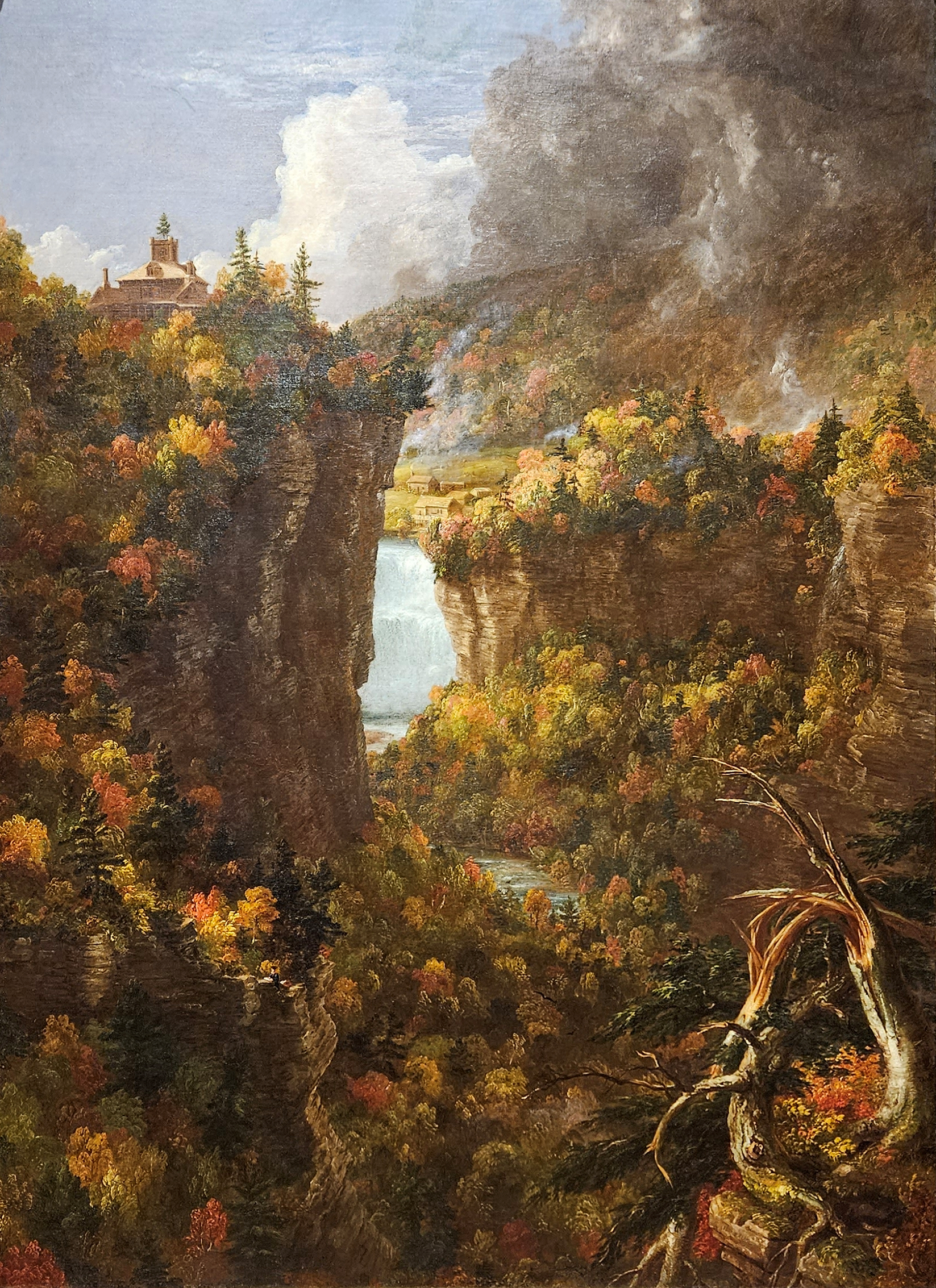
Thomas Cole painting of Portage Falls, 1839

Portage Falls are three large waterfalls located along the Genesee River. The falls are by the Genesee Arch Bridge and run through Letchworth State Park. William Pryor Letchworth once owned a tract and built his Glen Iris Estate in the area that is now part of the park. The town of Portage, New York and the hamlet of Portageville are nearby.

The three major waterfalls are known as the Upper (42°34′43″N 78°02′56″W), Middle (42°34′59″N 78°02′34″W), and Lower Falls (42°35′08″N 78°01′13″W) and pass through Portage Canyon in the southern section of the state park. A stone bridge just below the Lower Falls is part of a trail in the park. The Middle Falls are the highest. Above the Upper Falls, an active railroad trestle passes over the gorge.

Thomas Cole painted the falls in 1839. Stereoscopic views of the falls were also created. In 1843, geologist James Hall studied the rock formations and strata in the area. His publication included hand colored drawings of the falls.

A collection of stereoscopic views from 1875 in the New York Public Library's collection includes: "Views of Portage and vicinity including the Genesee River; waterfalls; wooden and iron railroad bridges, including ruins of the wooden bridge; a "canalduct" (Genesee Canal?); Genesee Valley Sand Stone quarry showing men working; Catlin House, Cascade House, and Glen Iris, including group playing croquet and a canoe in the lake; estate of Wm. P. Letchworth, which was later made into Letchworth State Park; a man sitting beside a tent, bridge beyond."

== Nomenclature ==
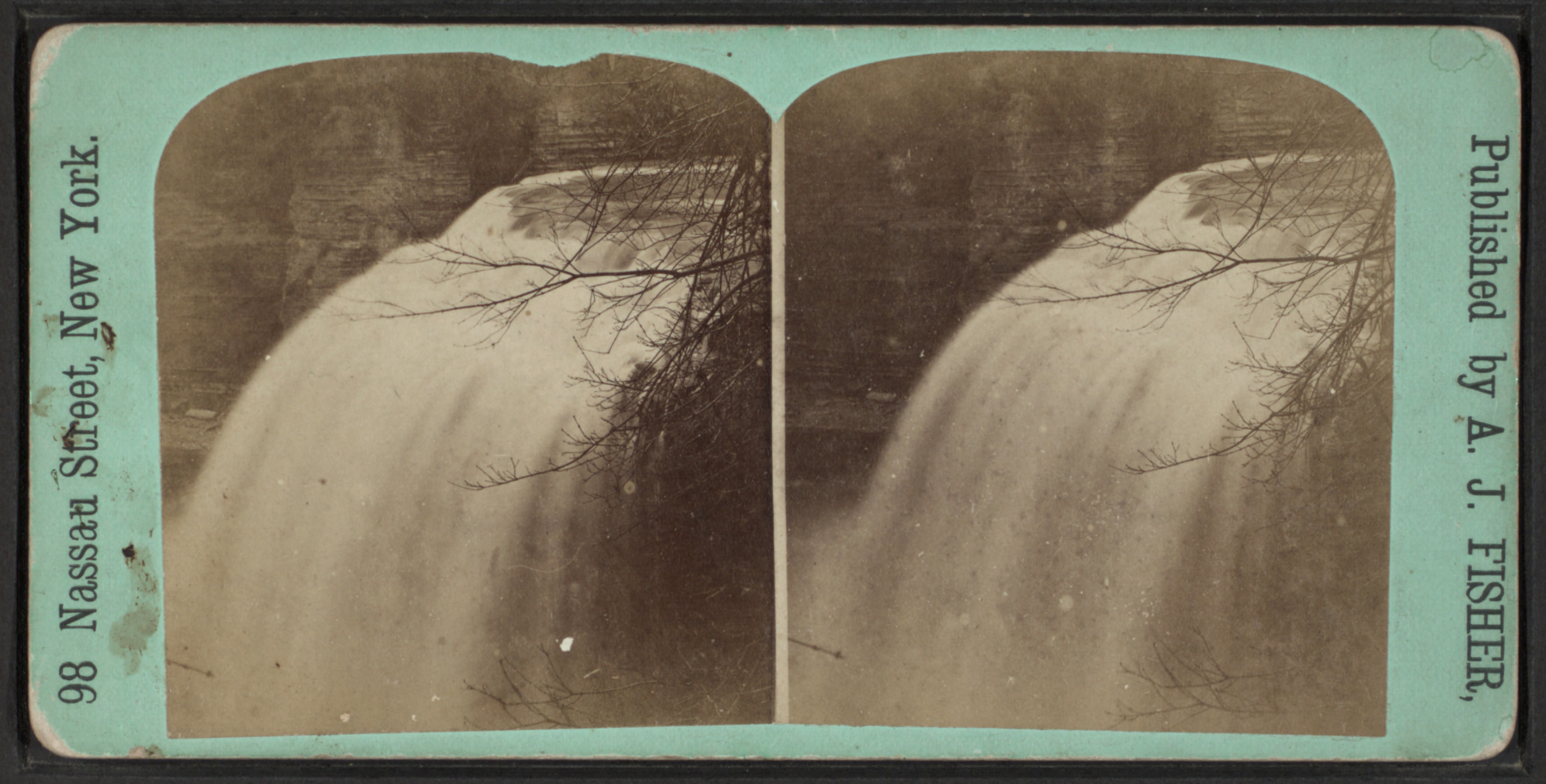
Stereoscopic photograph of the falls by A. J. Fisher

A portage is the carrying of a boat between two bodies of water to bypass an impassable stretch.

== Train service ==
The Buffalo & New York Railroad and Erie Railroads advised passengers: "N.B. Pleasure seekers desirous of visiting Portage Falls and the High Bridge can leave Buffalo on the Lightening train at 6:15 or Mail at 9:35 A.M., and returning, leave Portage at 5:35 and arrive in Buffalo at 9:00, giving them over nine hours at Portage for the enjoyment of scenery unsurpassed in wild and picturesque beauty and sublimity."

== Canal and bridge ==
The Genesee Valley Canal was constructed to allow boat traffic to bypass the falls, A 400 foot viaduct was built across the river. In 1853, a wooden bridge was constructed across the gorge.
