= Letchworth State Park =

State park in Castile, New York state, United States

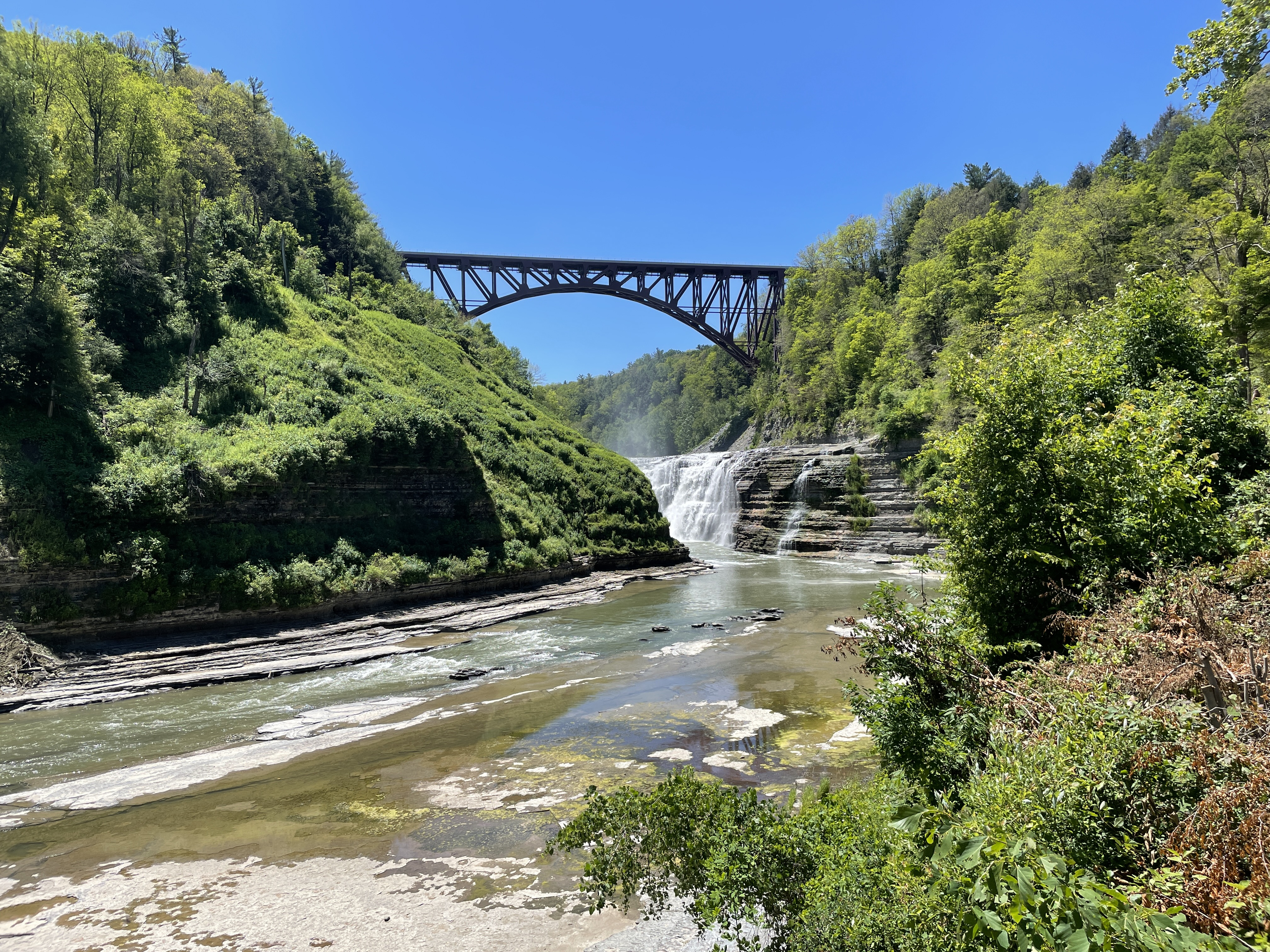
- View of the Upper Falls and the Genesee Arch Bridge at Letchworth State Park

- Location within New York
- Type: State park
- Location: Livingston and Wyoming counties, New York, United States
- Coordinates: 42°38′5″N 77°59′0″W
- Area: 14,427 acres (58.4 km^{2})
- Created: 1906; 120 years ago
- Operator: New York State Office of Parks, Recreation and Historic Preservation
- Visitors: 644,441 (in 2014)
- Open: All year
- Website: Letchworth State Park
- Letchworth State Park
- U.S. National Register of Historic Places
- Architect: Letchworth, William P.; et al.; Bryant Fleming
- Architectural style: Greek Revival, Italianate
- NRHP reference No.: 03000718
- Added to NRHP: November 4, 2005

Letchworth State Park is a 14,427-acre (5,838 ha) New York State Park located in Livingston and Wyoming Counties in western Upstate New York. The park is roughly 17 miles (27 km) long, following the course of the Genesee River as it flows north through a deep gorge and over several large waterfalls. It is located 35 miles (56 km) southwest of Rochester and 60 miles (97 km) southeast of Buffalo, and spans portions of the Livingston County towns of Leicester, Mount Morris and Portage, as well as the Wyoming County towns of Castile and Genesee Falls.

In 1859, Buffalo industrialist William Pryor Letchworth (1823–1910) began purchasing land near the Middle Falls, and started construction of his Glen Iris Estate. In 1906 he bequeathed the 1,000-acre (4 km^{2}) estate to New York, which soon after became the core of the newly created Letchworth State Park. The park prominently features three large waterfalls – the Upper, Middle, and Lower Falls – on the Genesee River, which flows within a deep gorge that winds through the park. The rock walls of the gorge, which rise up to 550 feet (170 m) in places, prompted the area's reputation as the "Grand Canyon of the East".

== Features and activities ==
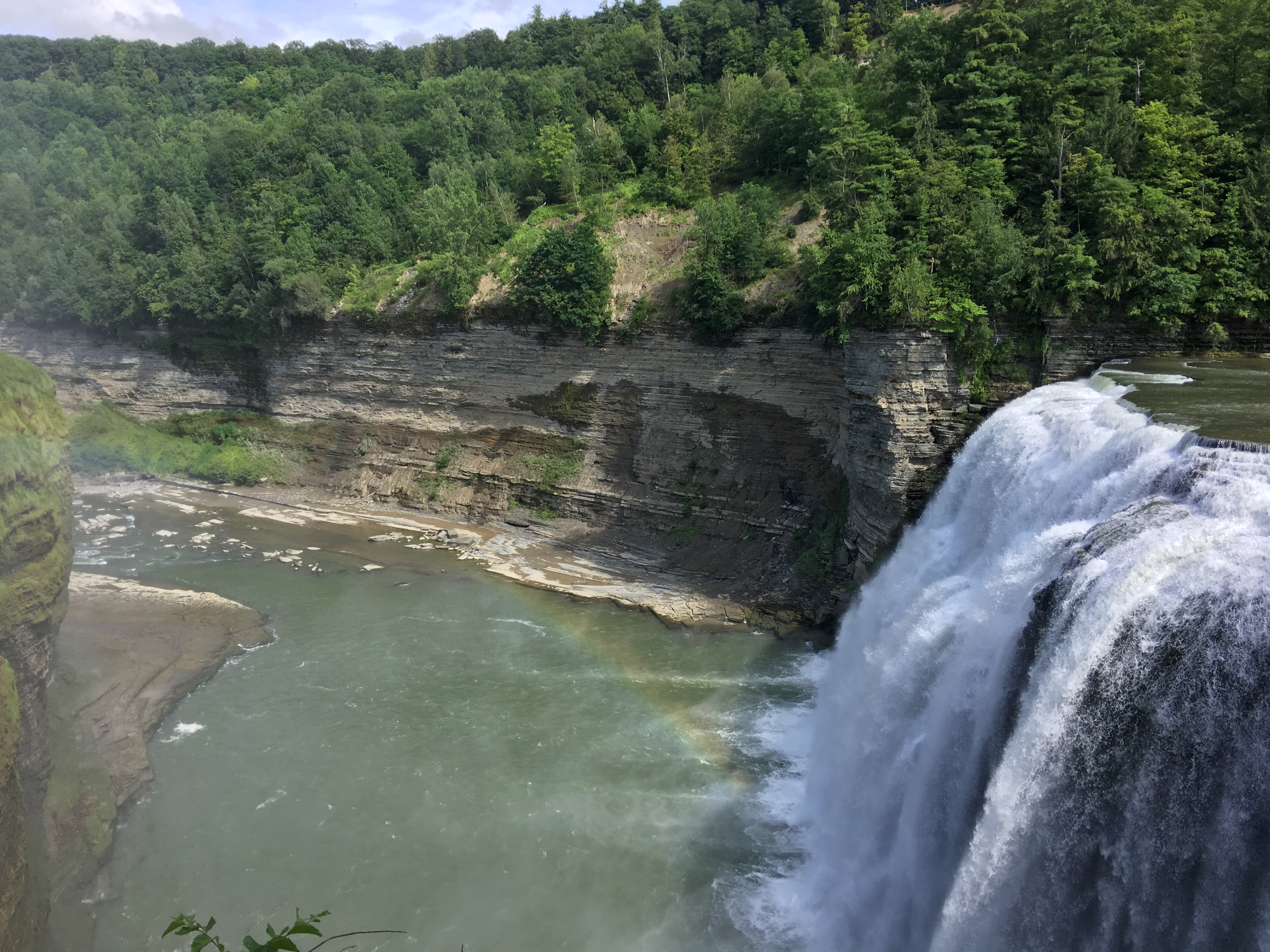
View of Middle Falls at Letchworth State Park

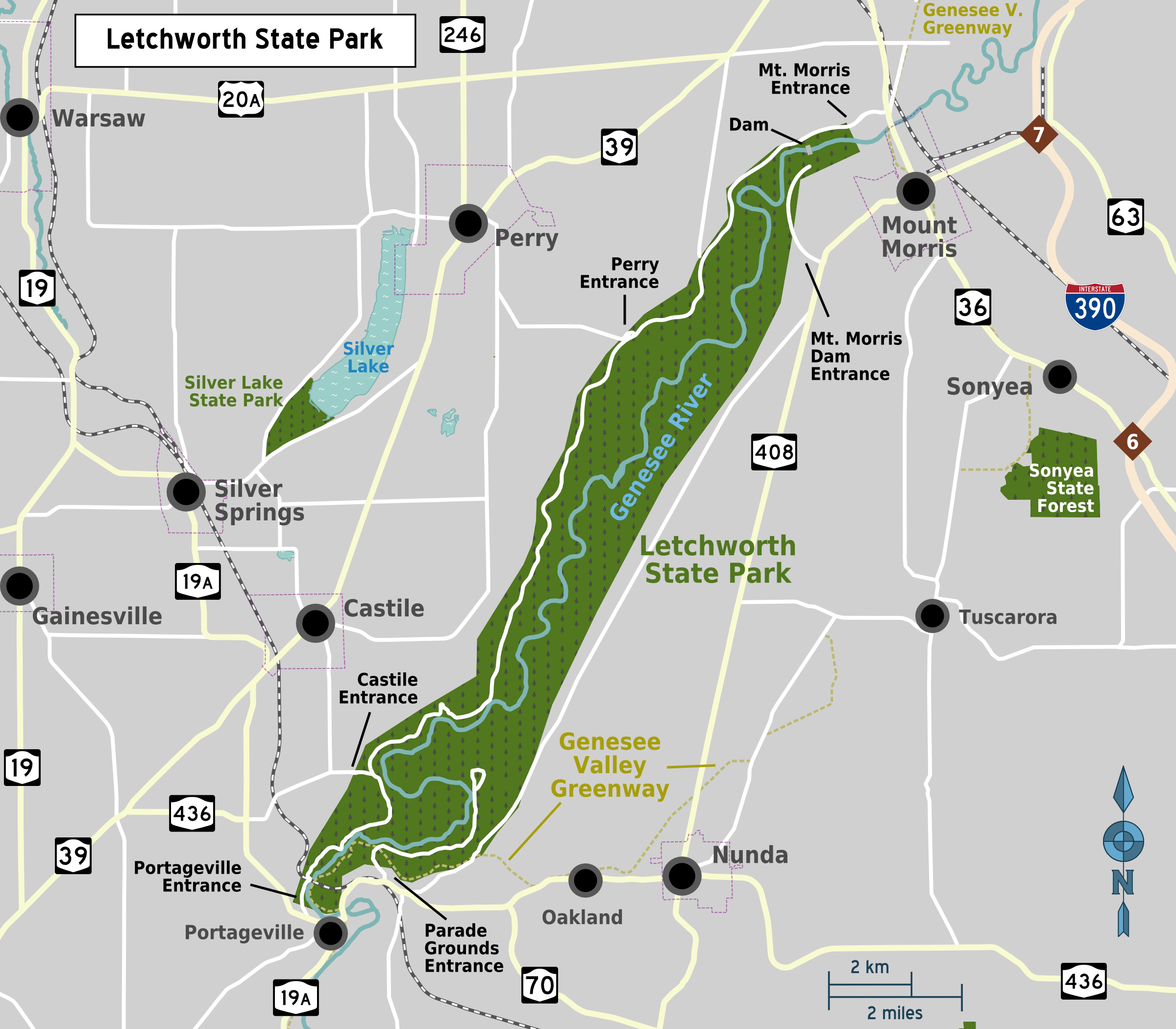
Map of Letchworth State Park and surrounding area.

Park entrances are located near Mount Morris, Perry, Castile and Portageville. A paved two or three-lane road follows the west side of the gorge, allowing many scenic viewpoints for the geologic features.

The park includes pavilions, picnic tables, playgrounds, 66 miles (106 km) of hiking trails, two large swimming pools, cabins, campsites for tents, trailer sites with dumping stations, and horse-riding trails. Activities within the park include hiking, biking, fishing, whitewater rafting and kayaking, geocaching, and hunting (wild turkey and deer when in season). During the winter, the park facilitates snowmobiling, cross-country skiing, snow tubing, and horse-drawn sleighs. Hot air ballooning is available at the park, weather permitting.

In 2015, Letchworth State Park won USA Today's Reader's Choice competition as the best state park in the United States. In 2020 the park topped a similar list.

=== Waterfalls and geology ===
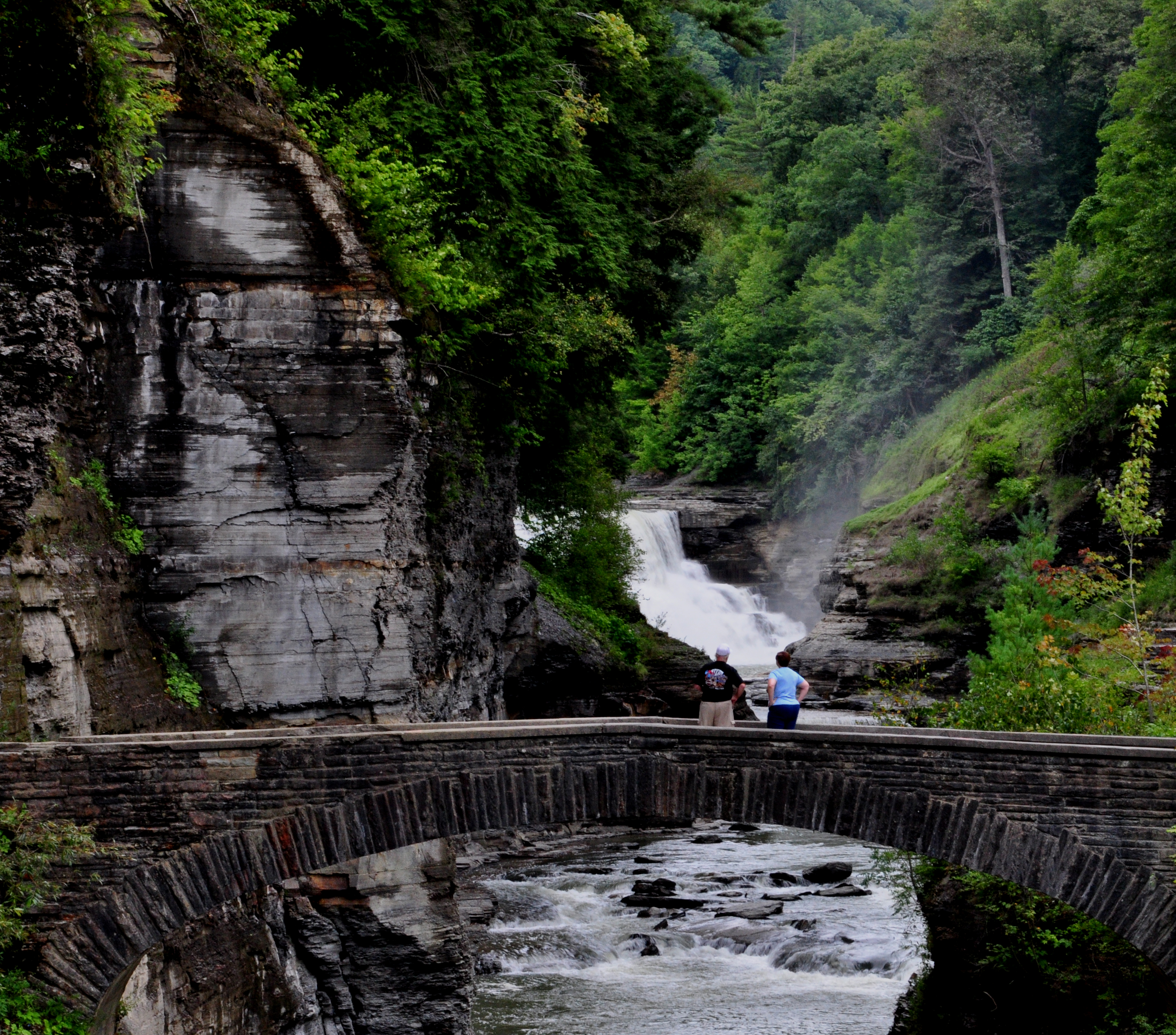
Lower Falls and stone footbridge at Letchworth State Park

Within the park, there are three large waterfalls on the Genesee River and as many as 50 waterfalls found on tributaries that flow into it; the deep gorge formed by the river, with rock walls rising up to 550 feet (170 m) in places and which narrow to 400 feet (120 m) across above the middle of the three falls, prompted the area's reputation as the "Grand Canyon of the East". The three major waterfalls — called the Upper, Middle, and Lower Falls — are located in Portage Canyon, the southern section of the park. The only trail bridging the Genesee River in the park crosses a stone bridge just below the Lower Falls. The Middle Falls is the highest, and the Upper Falls has a recently built (2017) active Norfolk Southern Railway arch bridge crossing immediately above it, replacing a historic 1875 Erie Railroad bridge.

The park also contains Inspiration Falls, a ribbon waterfall that is located on a tributary creek a short distance east of the Inspiration Point Overlook, 0.4 miles (640 m) west of the park visitor center. It has a total drop of 350 feet (110 m). While impressive in its height, it is seasonal and often appears as only a water stain on the cliff. The falls faces to the south-southwest and has a crest that is one foot (300 mm) wide.

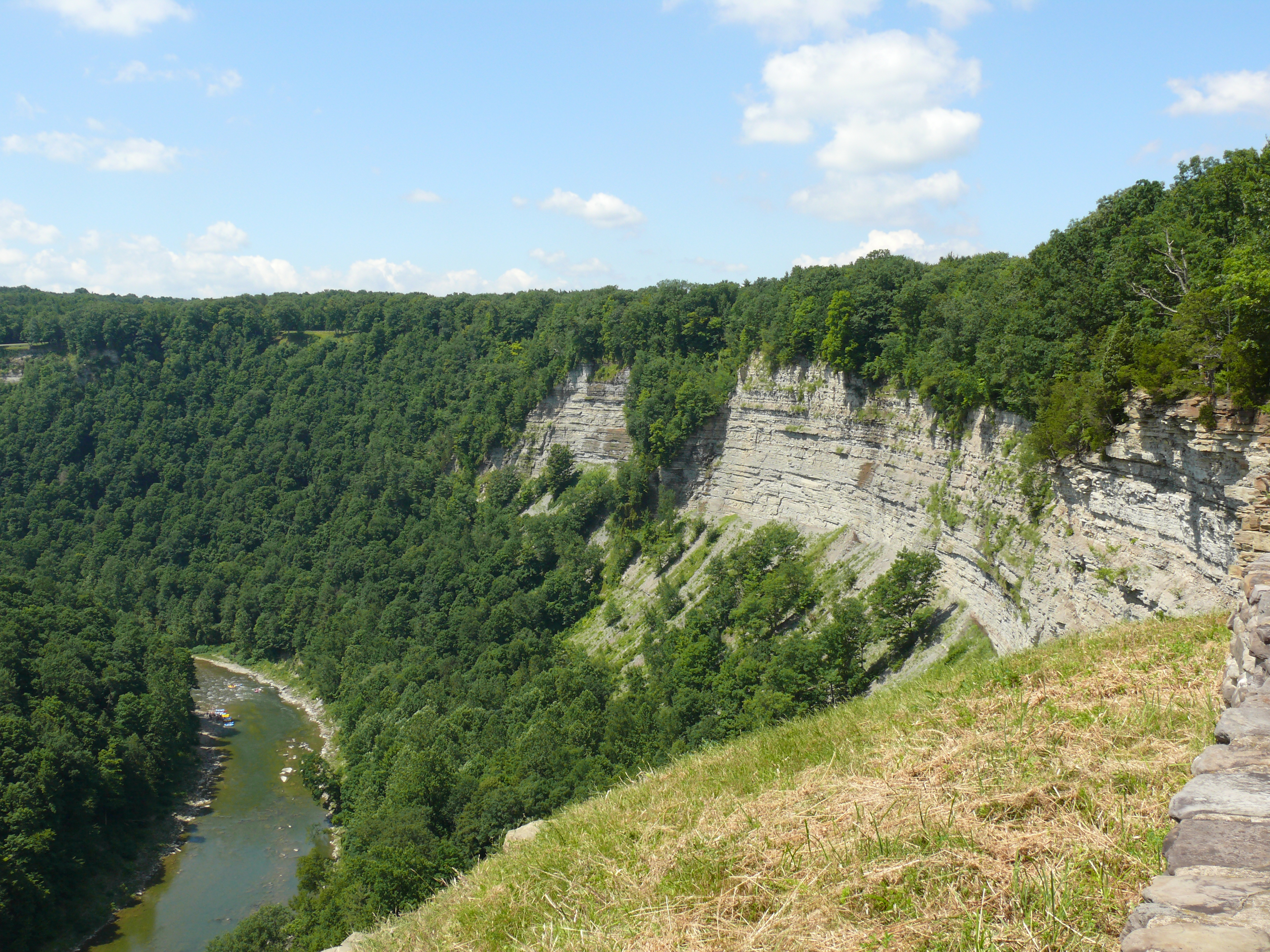
View of the Genesee River and gorge

The bedrock exposed in the gorge is Devonian in age, mostly shales, with some layers of limestone and sandstone. The rock was laid down in an ancient inland sea, and it holds many marine fossils. The landform of the section of the Genesee River valley represented by the park is geologically very young, caused by a diversion of the river from the old valley by the last continental glacier, which forced the river to cut a new section of valley.

=== Historic sites and museums ===
The historic, restored Glen Iris Inn, William Pryor Letchworth's former residence adapted for use as a hotel, is located on the top of a cliff overlooking Middle Falls and offers in-season meals and overnight accommodations. It is open to the public for breakfast, lunch and dinner.

The park is the present-day site of the grave of Mary Jemison, a Scots-Irish immigrant pioneer who was captured at the age of 12 from central Pennsylvania by a French and Shawnee raiding party during the French and Indian War. She was soon adopted by a family of Seneca people, and eventually lived in western New York on the Genesee River. She became thoroughly assimilated and chose to live with the Seneca for the rest of her long life, having a total of seven children by two successive husbands. Her remains were exhumed from the Buffalo Creek Reservation and reinterred on the grounds of a Seneca Council House, relocated to the site by Letchworth and rededicated in 1872.

The park also features the William Pryor Letchworth Museum, which was founded with the collections of the park's founder. The exhibits focus on the natural and cultural history of the Genesee Valley, and include archaeological artifacts of the Seneca nation, and displays on Mary Jemison, early pioneers, the Genesee Valley Canal and William Pryor Letchworth.

The Humphrey Nature Center opened in 2016. Operated year-round by New York State, the 5,000-square-foot (460 m^{2}) sustainable building features classrooms and meeting rooms, a research lab, a butterfly garden, and connections to various trails.

=== Mount Morris Dam ===
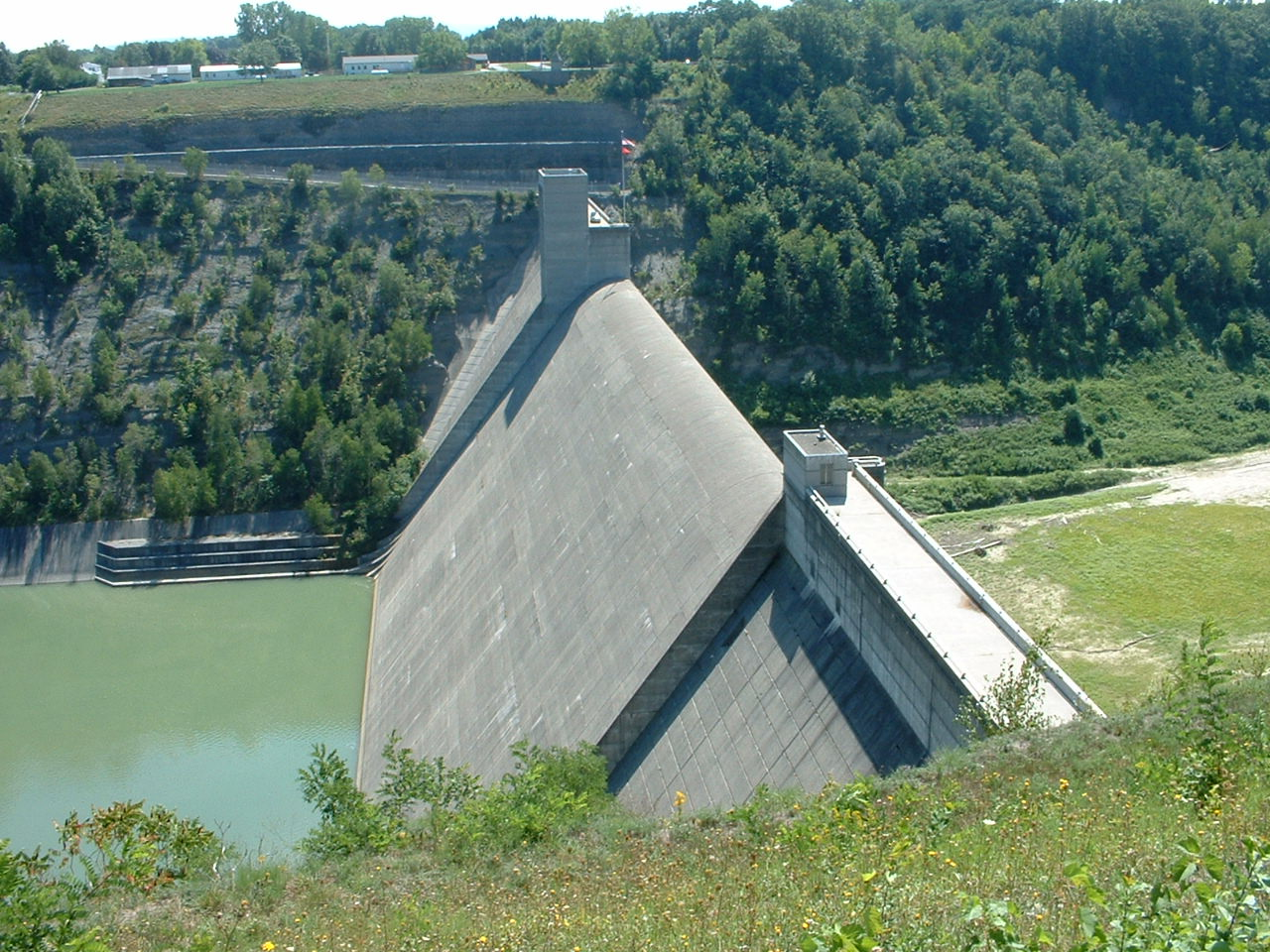
Mount Morris Dam

Construction of the Mount Morris Dam, at the north end of the park, was begun in 1948 by the United States Army Corps of Engineers under the Flood Control Act of 1944, and completed in 1954. The Genesee River became wider and deeper immediately upstream as a result, but areas downstream were spared yearly flooding which destroyed valuable farmland.

The Mount Morris Dam is the largest flood control device of its kind (concrete gravity) east of the Mississippi River. It is 1,028 feet (313 m) in length and rises 230 feet (70 m) from the riverbed. The dam proved its worth during the Flood of 1972, saving thousands of acres of farmland and the city of Rochester from flooding.

=== Portage Viaduct ===
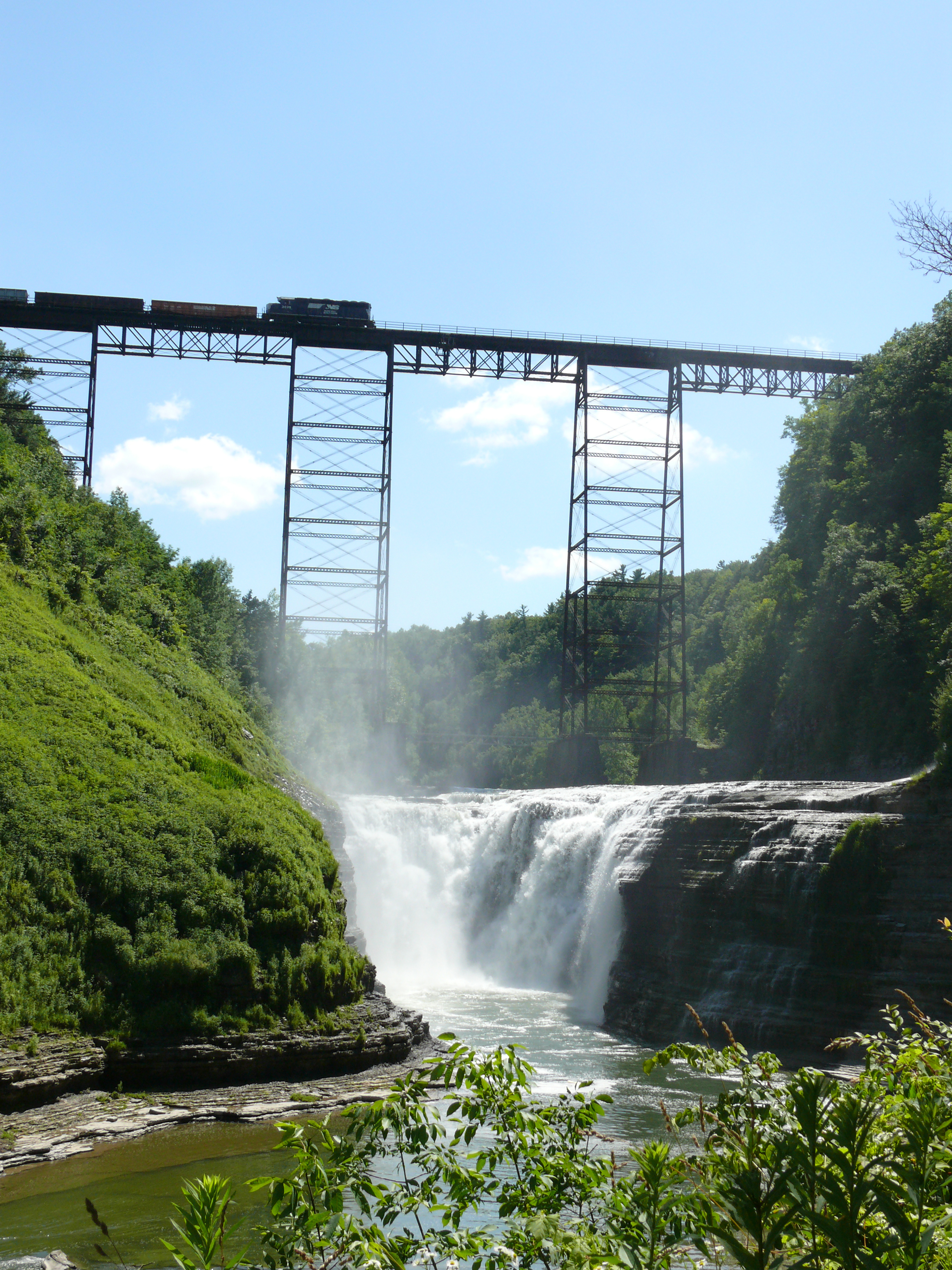
Upper Falls with a train passing over the old Portage Viaduct (2009)

The Portage Viaduct (1875) was an iron Erie Railroad bridge located upstream and within view of the park's Upper Falls. The bridge was 820 feet (250 m) long and 240 feet (73 m) high. Although walking on the structure was considered trespassing, visitors to the park commonly disregarded warning signs in order to view the gorge from the bridge, despite the safety concerns associated with walking on an active railroad bridge.

On November 29, 2011, Norfolk Southern Railway announced plans to demolish the Portage Viaduct and build a new bridge approximately 75 feet (23 m) to the south of the 1875 structure. Norfolk Southern had offered the old bridge to the State of New York, but the offer was declined due to a lack of available funds to convert the bridge into an observation platform. A steel arch design was approved for the bridge's replacement in late 2014, at an estimated cost of $71 million. The project was completed in late 2017. New train-activated gates at both ends of the new bridge now keep trespassing tourists off it when no approaching freight train is present.

== Park history ==
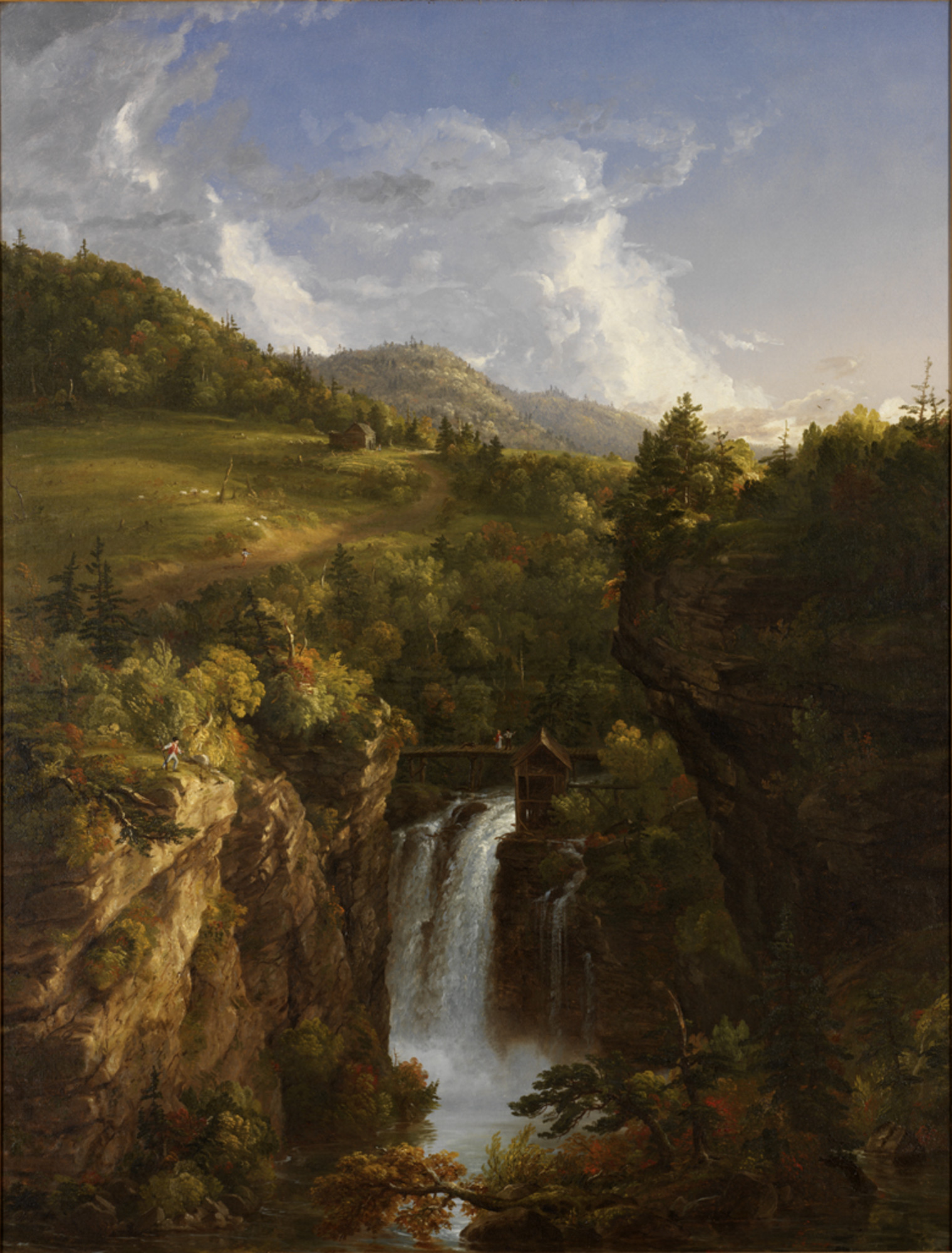
Genesee Scenery, an 1847 oil painting by Thomas Cole.

The territory of the park was long part of the homeland of the Seneca people, who were largely forced out after the American Revolutionary War, as they had been allies of the defeated British. The Seneca called the land around this canyon Sehgahunda, the "Vale of the three falls"; the Middle Falls (Ska-ga-dee) was believed to be so wondrous it made the sun stop at midday.

Having first viewed the gorge that was to become the park from a train on the nearby railroad trestle in 1858, William Pryor Letchworth purchased an initial 190 acres (0.77 km^{2}) of land near the Portage Falls in 1859 and subsequently began work on his Glen Iris Estate. By purchasing the land, Letchworth successfully halted plans to install a hydroelectric dam in the gorge that would have altered the flow of the river and diminished flows over the large waterfalls. He enlisted the services of the famous landscape artist William Webster to design winding paths and roadways, rustic bridges, glistening "lakes" and a sparkling fountain.

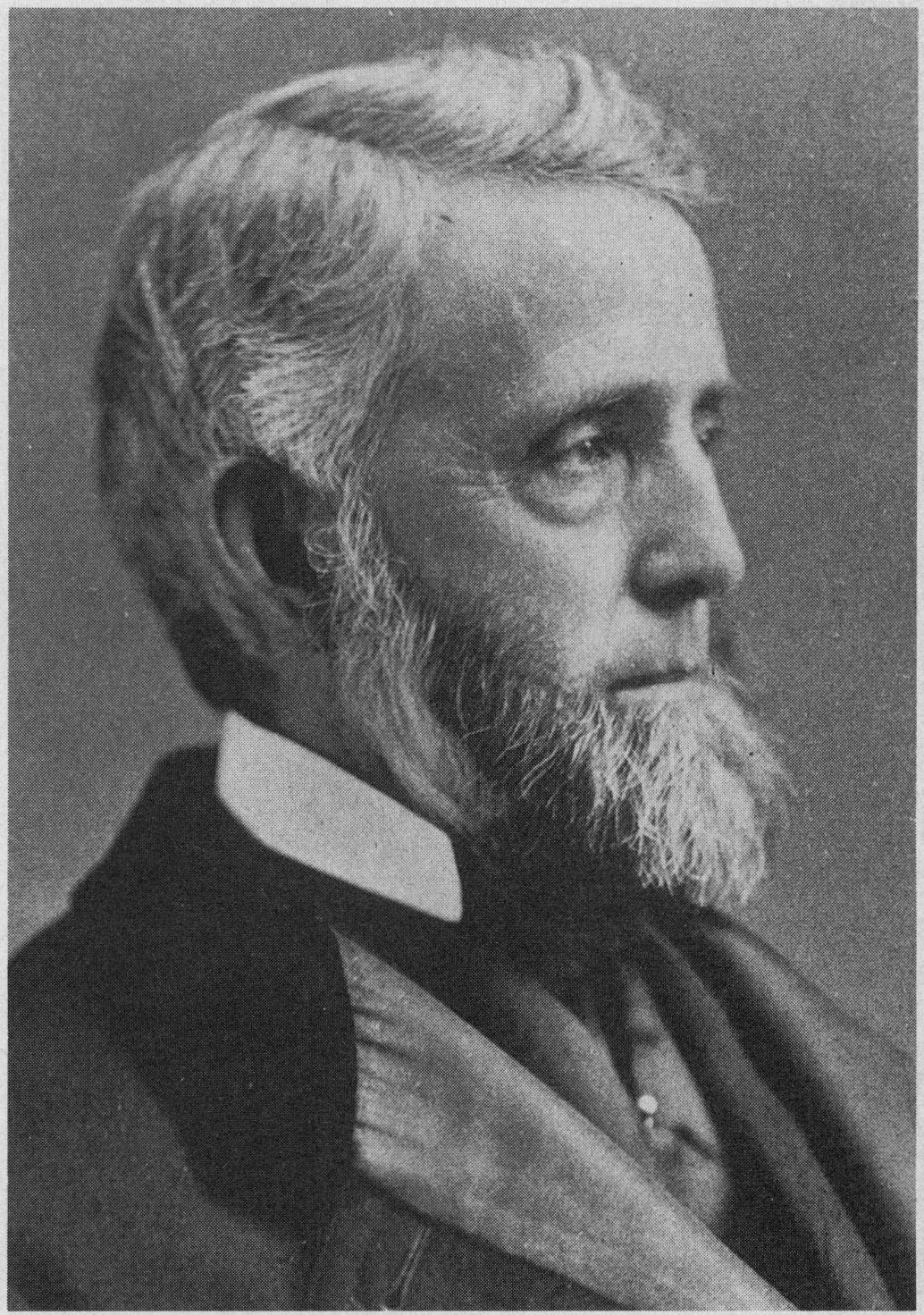
William Pryor Letchworth

Letchworth spent the following years expanding his landholdings in the area. In 1906, Letchworth granted the Glen Iris and the surrounding 1,000 acres (4 km^{2}) to the State of New York as a public park, intending to deter commercial businesses from damaging the fragile nature of the gorge and surrounding woodlands. He further required that the land be managed by the American Scenic and Historic Preservation Society. A plaque near the gorge contains a dedication written by Letchworth's niece in 1910, and reads:

God wrought for us this scene beyond compare
But one man's loving hand protected it
And gave to his fellow man to share.

George F. Kunz, president of the American Scenic and Historic Preservation Society of New York, was an enthusiastic supporter of the park. Dr. Kunz helped with the organization and preservation of the library of William Pryor Letchworth when the society took over the management of his estate in New York. In 1907, it was stated: "The library embraces one of the finest, if not the finest, private collection of books on charities in the country. It contains also a good collection of local histories, books about Indians, and a miscellaneous assortment of standard literature. His mementos - personal gifts and testimonials - are extremely interesting. It is most desirable that these should be kept together and adequately-preserved in a new library building, as part of the monument to the generous donor of Letchworth Park."

Further, Dr. Kunz helped with the 1910 memorial to Mary Jemison, "The White Indian of the Genesee", who is buried at "the ancient Indian Council House of the Senecas" located on the grounds of the Letchworth park.

Letchworth, having earned "life-residence" at the Glen Iris, died there on December 1, 1910. He was buried in Buffalo at Forest Lawn Cemetery.

The park was the beneficiary of numerous enhancements enacted by workers from the Civilian Conservation Corps, who inhabited a large camp at the park during the 1930s. Improvements enacted by the CCC included the construction of cabins, overlooks, bridges and trails.

=== Old Portageville Bridge Fire ===
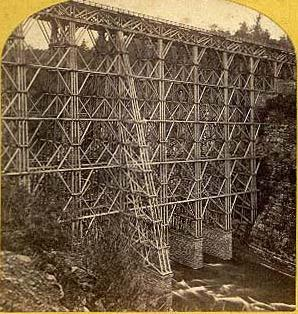
Old Portage Bridge in 1864

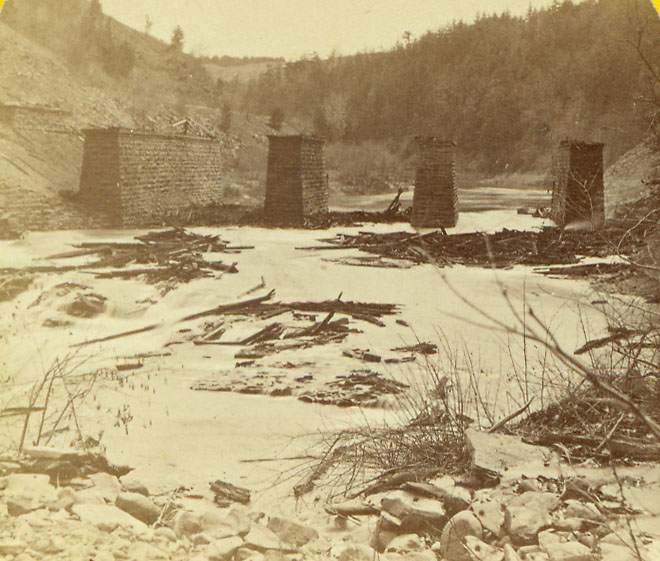
Ruins of the Old Portage Bridge, 1875

The Erie Railroad Company built a wooden trestle bridge over the Genesee River just above the Upper Falls. Construction started on July 1, 1851, and the bridge opened on August 16, 1852. At the time, it was the longest and tallest wooden bridge in the world.

In the early morning hours of Thursday, May 6, 1875, the great wooden railroad bridge was destroyed in a tremendous fire. The bridge was a total loss, leaving only the concrete bridge abutments.

Immediately after the Portage Bridge fire, officials of the Erie Railroad Company moved quickly to replace the wooden bridge with an iron design. Construction began on June 8, 1875, and the Portage Viaduct opened for traffic on July 31, 1875: an incredible construction feat for that or any other time.

=== Flood of 1972 ===
One of the greatest natural disasters in Genesee Valley history took place in June 1972. Hurricane Agnes came ashore on the Florida Panhandle on June 19, 1972, and moved north through Georgia and South Carolina. The hurricane then went out to sea via North Carolina, recharged its energy and hit the Southern Tier of New York State on June 22, 1972.

Although Agnes was only a Category 1 hurricane, it soon stalled over North Central Pennsylvania. Caught up in a slow moving low pressure system, the storm drifted slowly northeastward into New York State. The area, having already been soaked by showers the week before, could not absorb the six to twelve inches (150 to 300 mm) rainfall that fell over Pennsylvania and New York. Known locally as the Flood of '72, the event had a tremendous impact on Western New York and Letchworth Park.

Although the Genesee River and Letchworth Park was not hit as hard as the Susquehanna Valley and other areas, the impact of the flood was felt in the park for many years. The Lower Falls Bridge and trail to Sugar Loaf did not officially reopen for several years. Visitors can still see some of the natural scars left by the flood waters more than 50 years ago.

Video footage of the devastation can be viewed upon request at the William Pryor Letchworth Museum, located near the Glen Iris Inn.

== Gallery ==
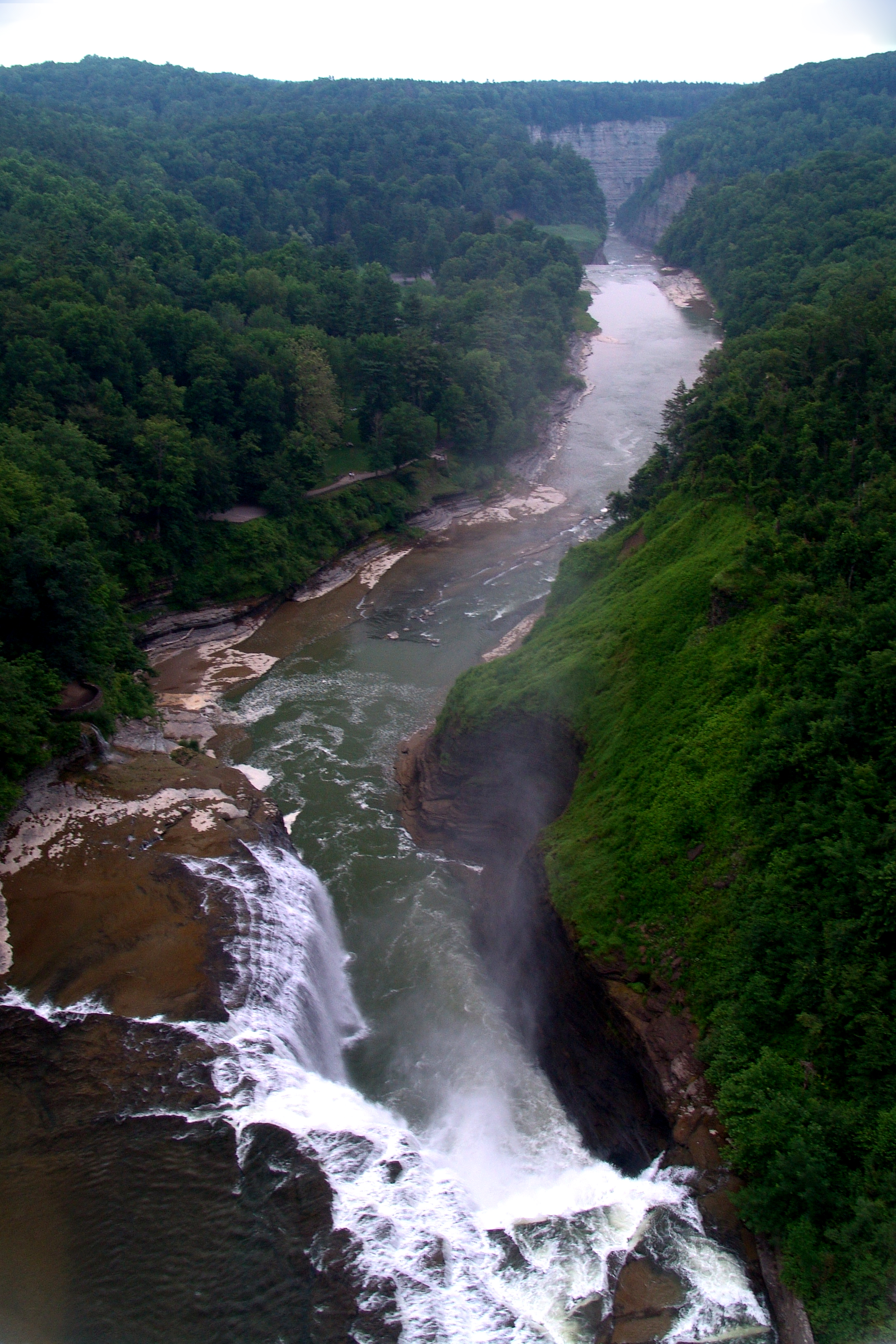
View from the Portage Viaduct

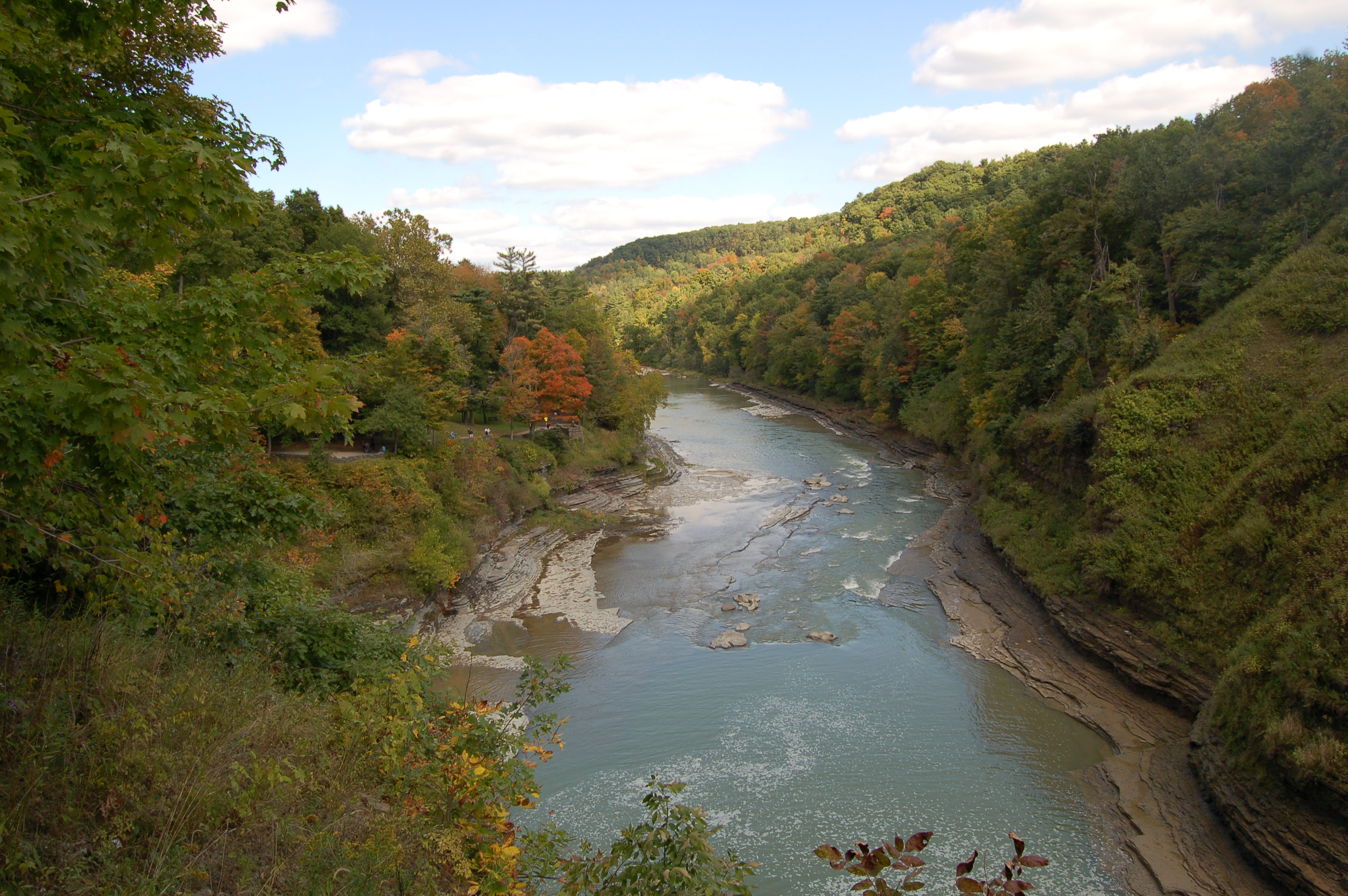
View from the Upper Falls

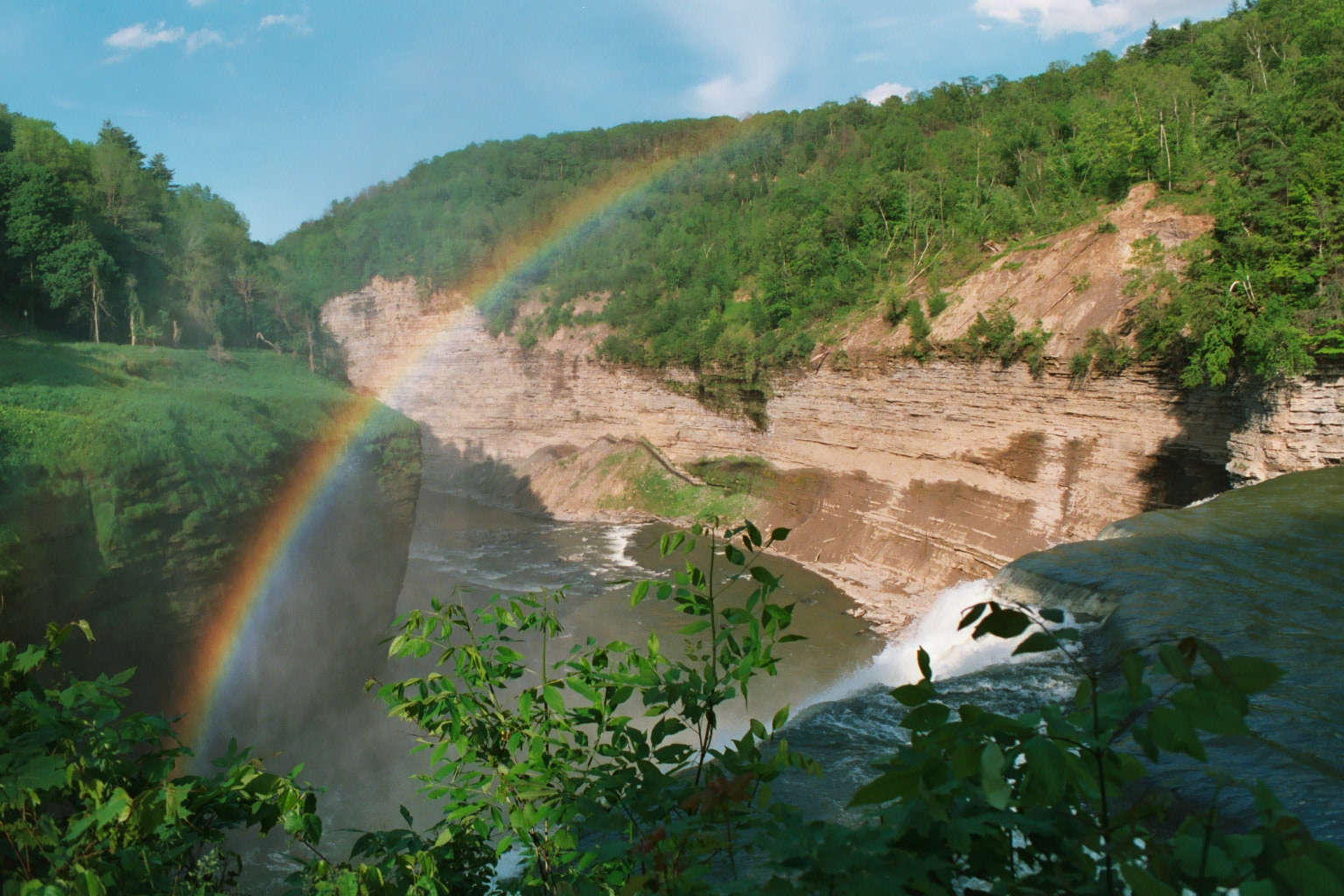
Middle Falls

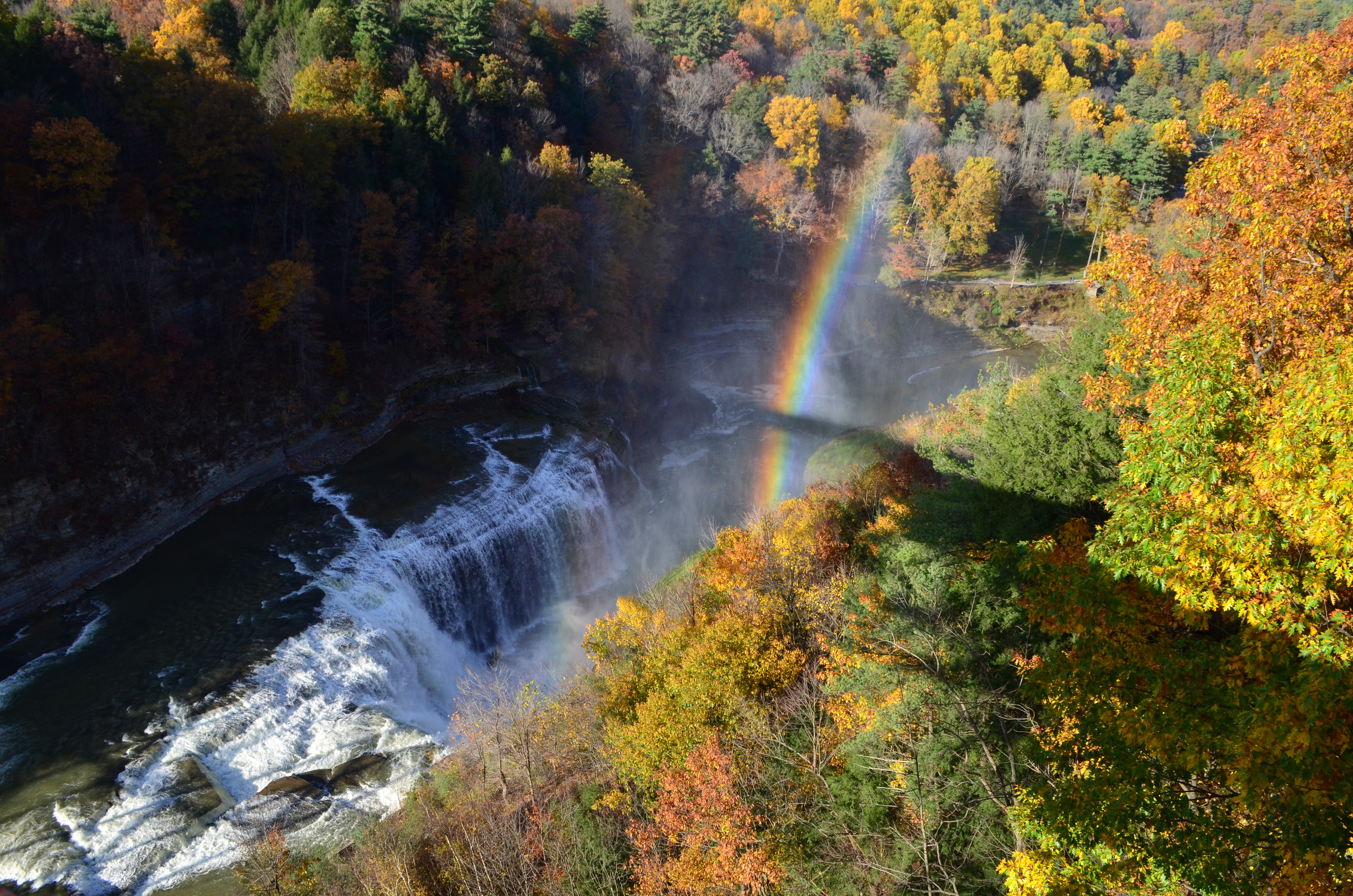
Upper Falls in autumn

Video of the Middle Falls

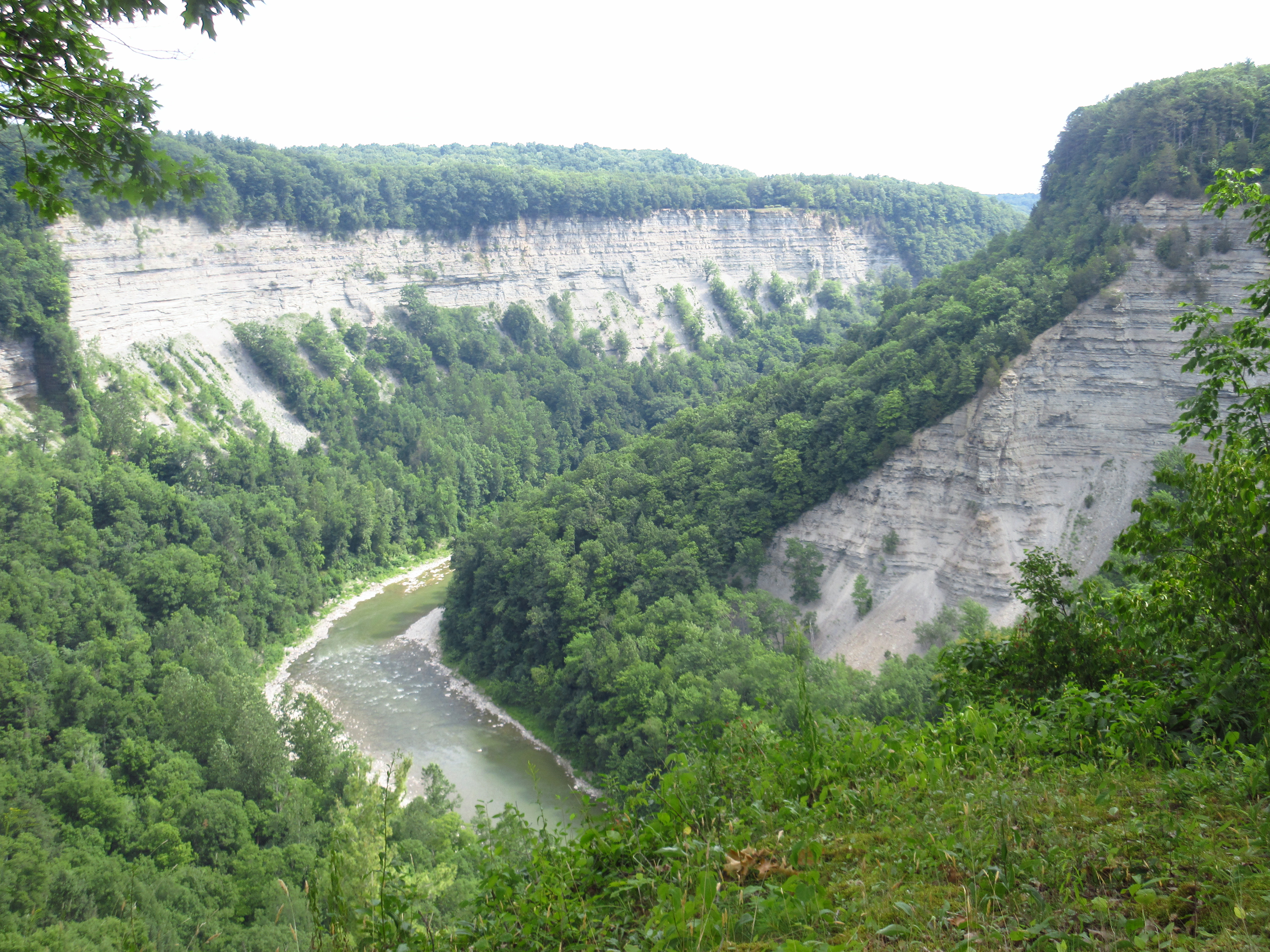
Genesee River Canyon downstream of the falls

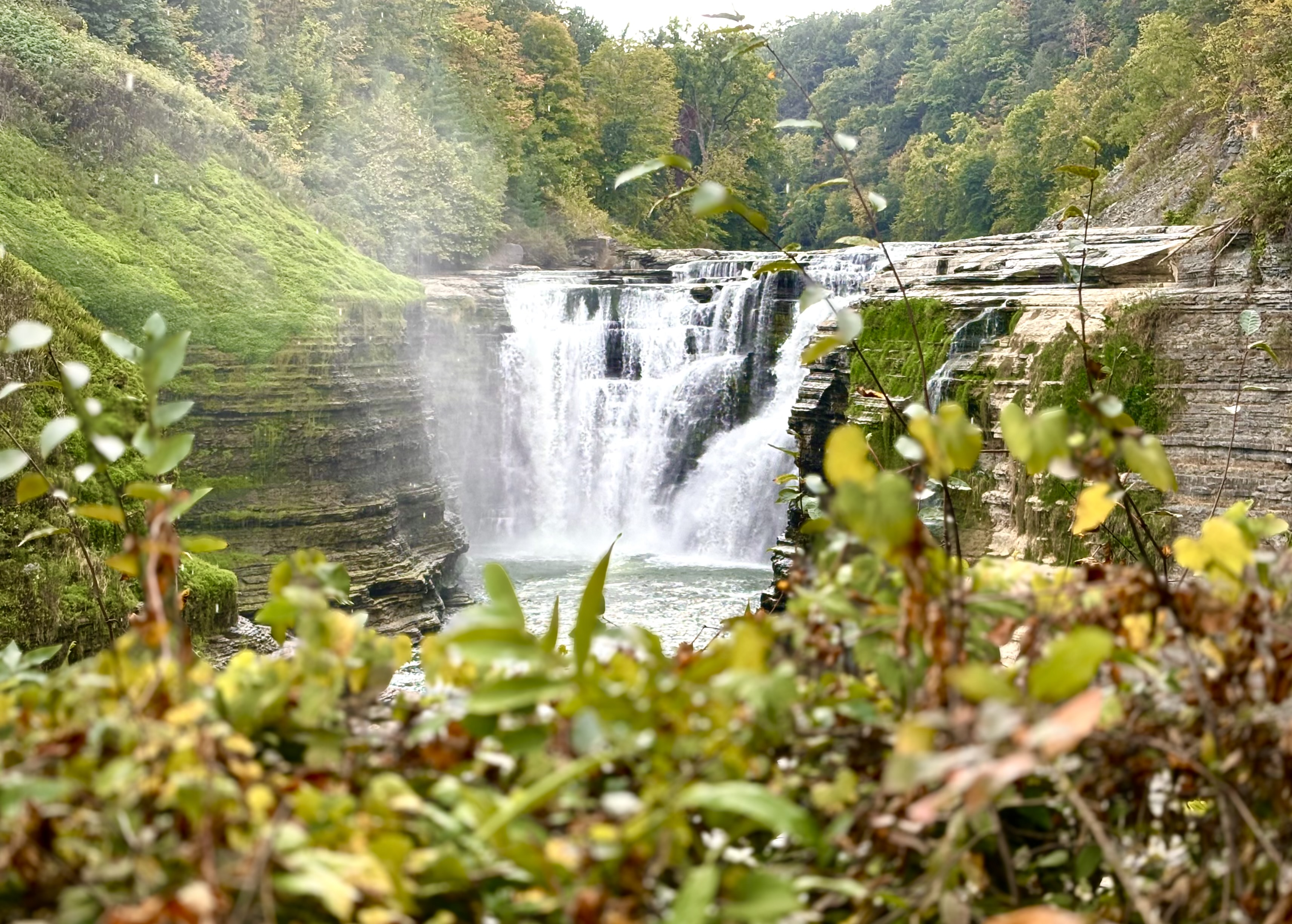
Waterfalls inside Letchworth State Park

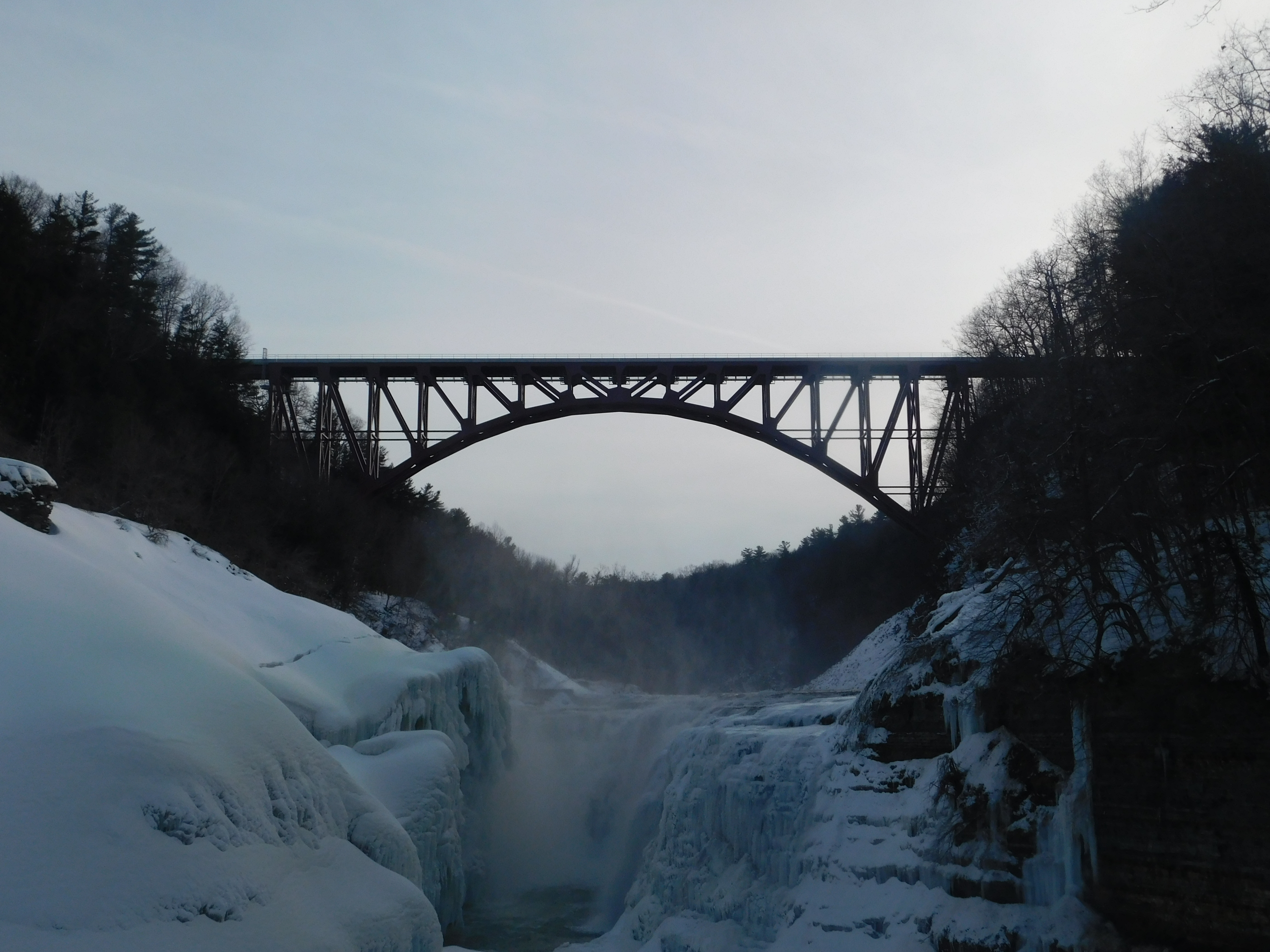
Genesee Arch Bridge and Upper Falls in late winter

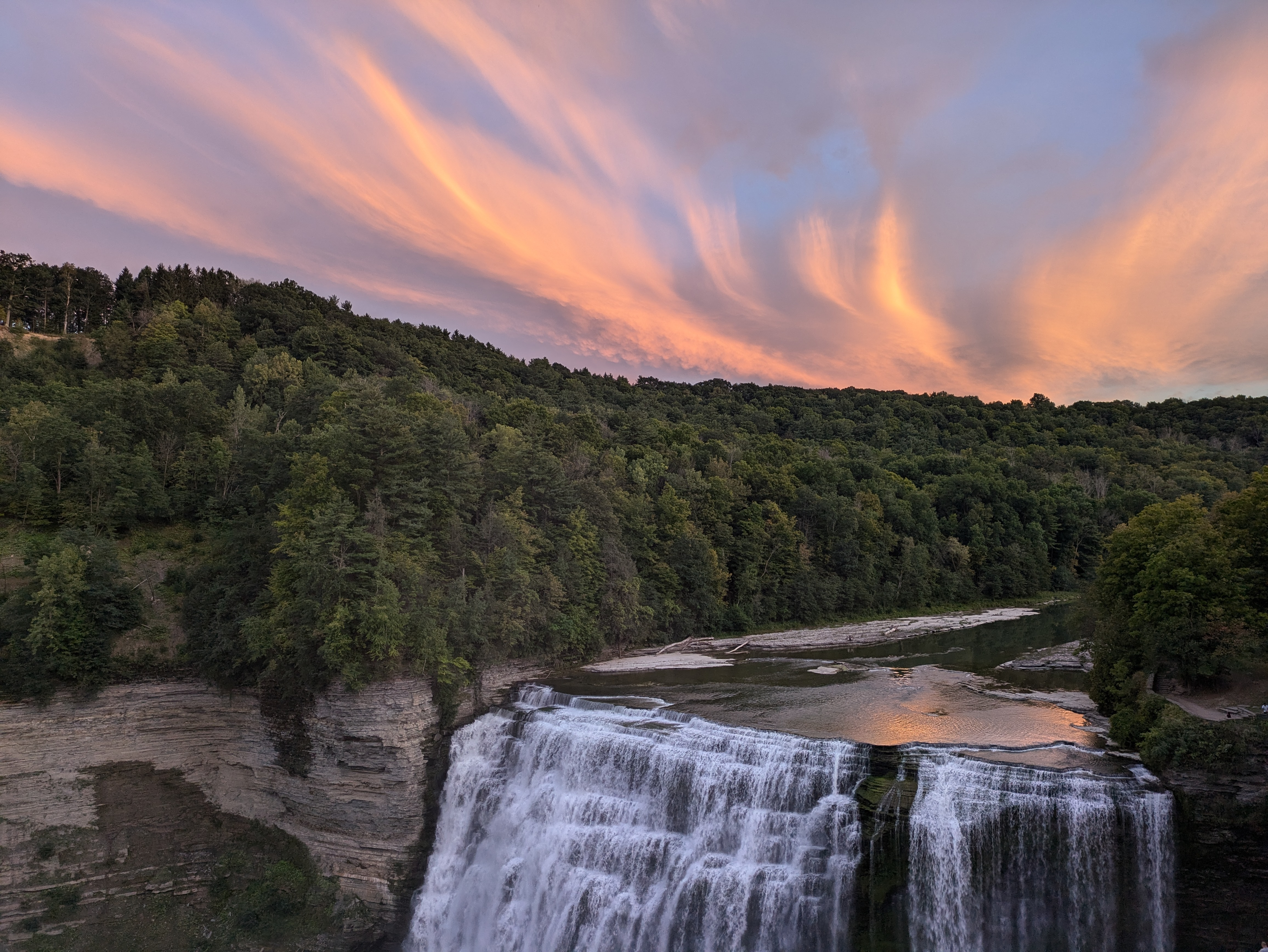
Sunset at Middle Falls

== See also ==
- List of New York state parks
- List of waterfalls
