= Glen Iris Inn =

Coordinates: 42.584545°N 78.042862°W

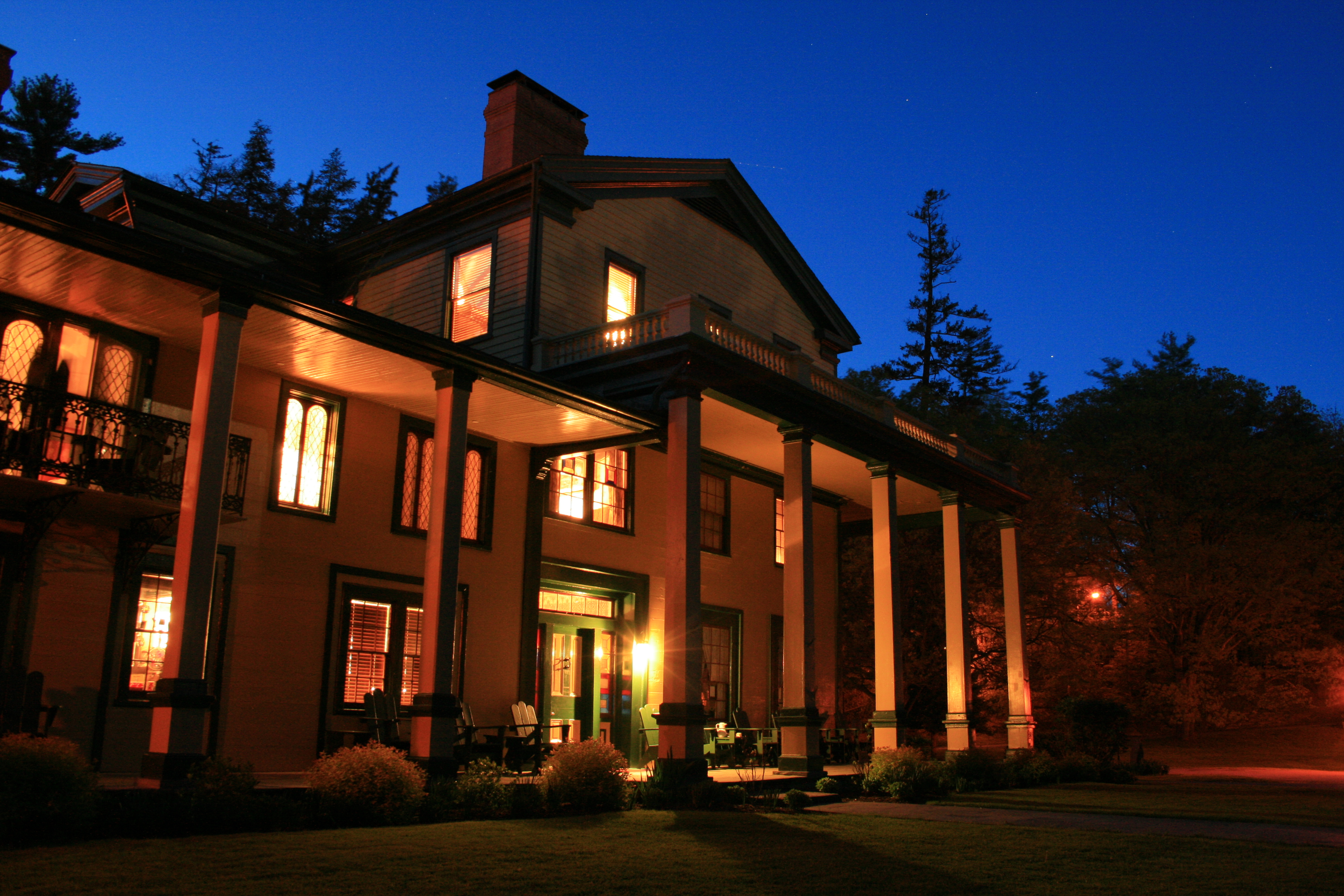

The Glen Iris Inn, William Pryor Letchworth's former home, is located on the top of a cliff overlooking Middle Falls in Letchworth State Park, New York State, USA. William Letchworth found the day-to-day operations of business burdensome and sought refuge on the site, where he decided to build a home. He settled on the location while seeing it from a high railroad bridge as a tourist on an Erie Railroad passenger train, gazing at the view in what the Seneca Indians called the Sehgahunda Valley, through which the Genesee River flowed. In 1859, he purchased his first tract of land near Portage Falls.

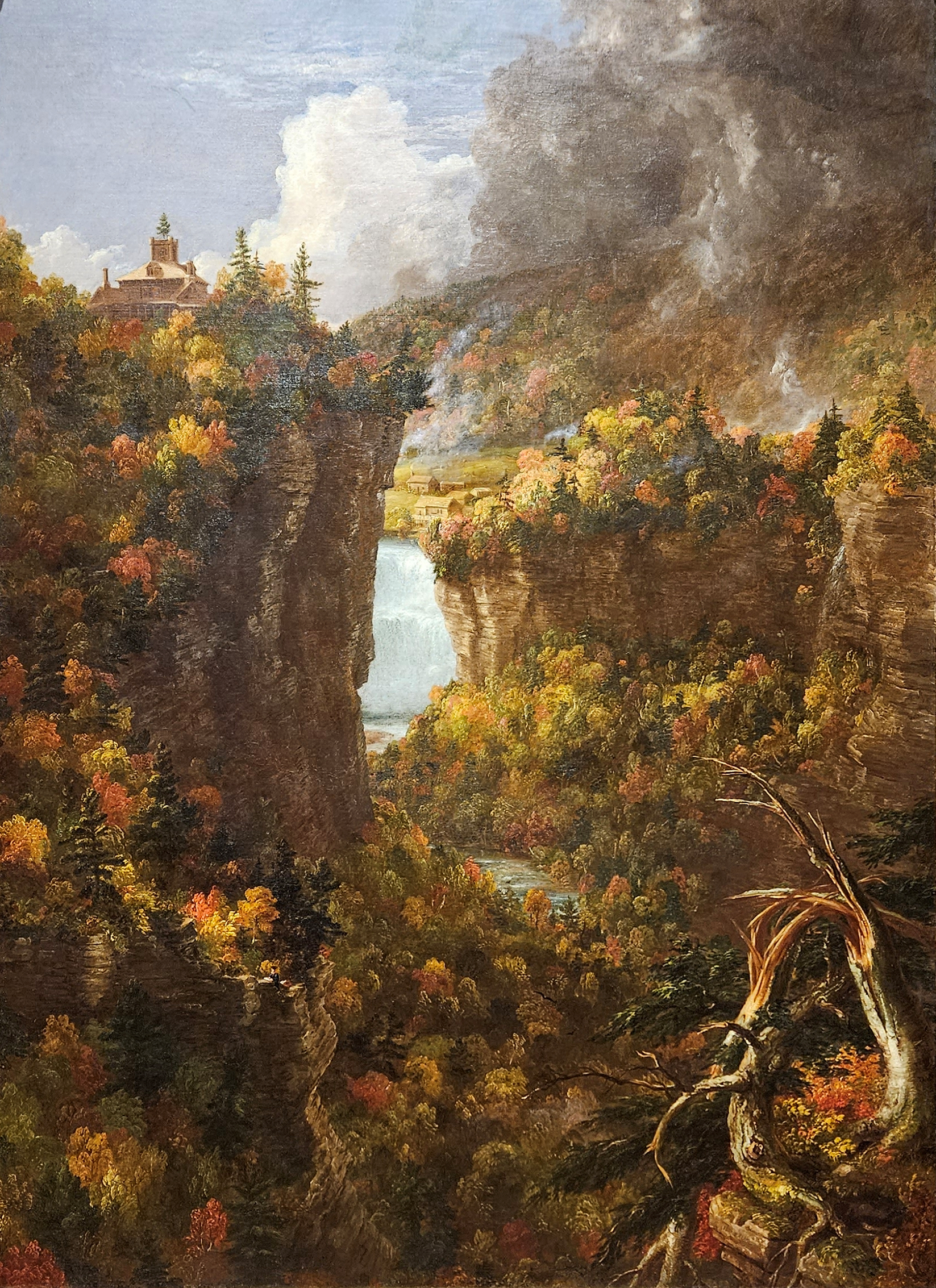
Thomas Cole painting of Portage Falls, 1839

Letchworth hired noted landscape architect William Webster to design the grounds of the estate, which Letchworth named Glen Iris after the Greek goddess of rainbows. Webster and some special guests eventually planted large varieties of trees and flowering bushes throughout the park, including white and red pines, oaks, and dogwoods.

Letchworth bequeathed his 1,000-acre (4 km^{2}) estate to New York in 1906, and the tract now forms the heart of Letchworth State Park. In 1914, Letchworth's home became a country inn and grew to become the center of a thriving state park.

== Sources ==
- The Glen Iris Story. Barnes, Katherine. Perry NY: Moxon Printing, 1973.
