= William Pryor Letchworth =

American philanthropist (1823–1910)

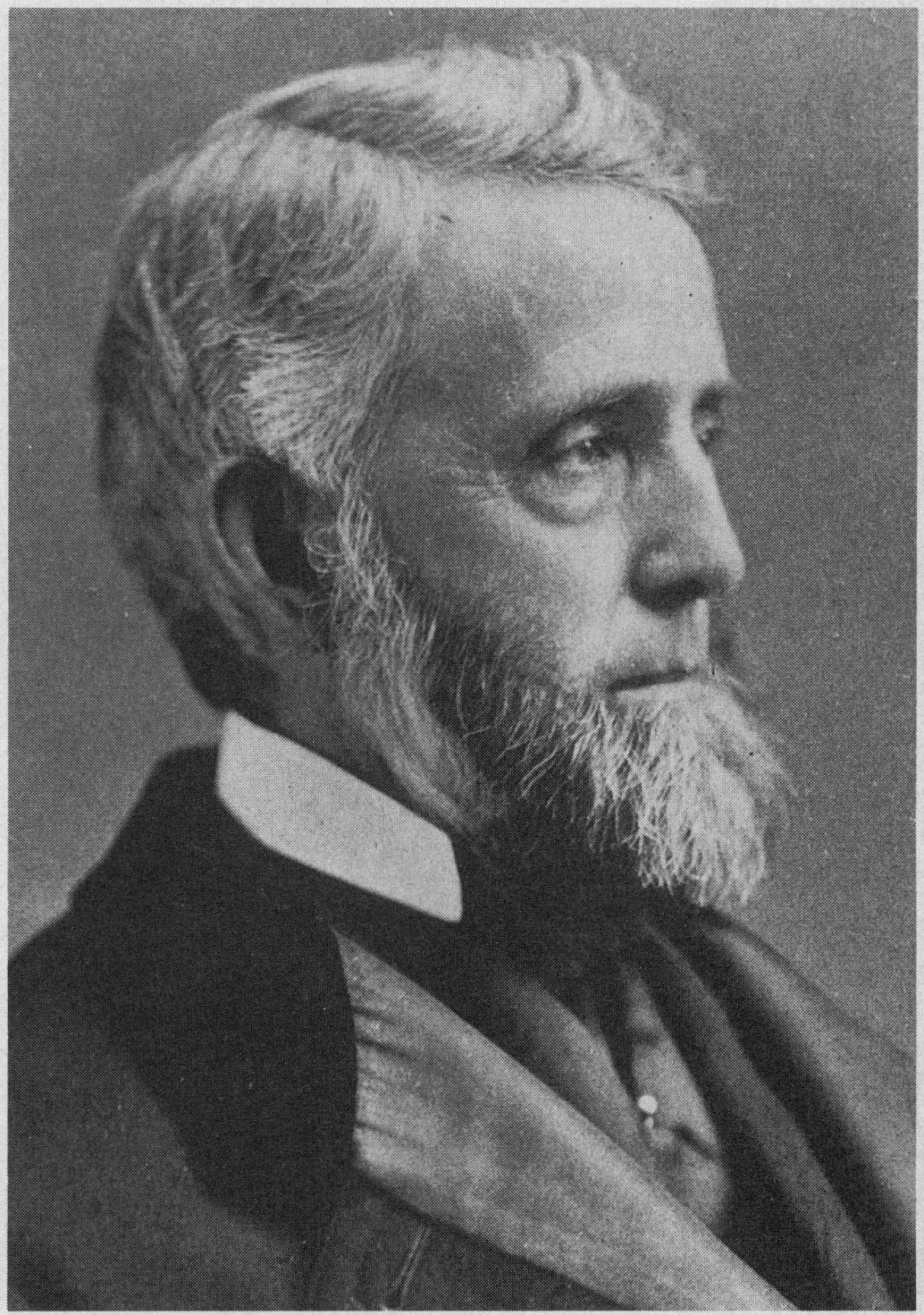
- Born: William Pryor Letchworth; May 26, 1823; Brownville, New York
- Died: December 1, 1910 (aged 87); Castile, New York
- Employer(s): Pratt & Letchworth
- Parent(s): Josiah Letchworth; Ann Hance

William Pryor Letchworth (May 26, 1823 – December 1, 1910) was an American businessman notable for his charitable work, including his donation of his 1,000-acre estate to the State of New York which became known as Letchworth State Park.

== Early years ==
Letchworth was born in Brownville, New York on May 26, 1823, the fourth of eight children born to Josiah Letchworth and Ann (née Hance) Letchworth. Raised as a Quaker, Letchworth learned the values of hard work, charity, and development of the intellect from his family.

== Career ==
At age 15, Letchworth was hired as a clerk at Hayden & Holmes, a saddlery and hardware company. Letchworth succeeded at his tasks and in business in general, and by age 22 was a partner at Pratt & Letchworth, a company involved in the "malleable iron" business, with Samuel Fletcher Pratt. He retired from the saddlery and iron goods work at age 46 and devoted himself to charitable works.

=== Charity and social work ===
In 1873, Letchworth was appointed to the New York State Board of Charities. "In 1875, he had inspected all the orphan asylums, poor-houses, city alms houses, and juvenile reformatories in the state which had an aggregate population of 17,791 children." Following his investigation, he recommended that all children under 2 years of age be removed from these institutions, which was accepted by the state. In 1878, Letchworth was elected as President of the Board. In 1889, Oscar Craig of Rochester, New York succeeded him as president; Craig died in 1894. Letchworth resigned from the State Board of Charities in 1897.

Letchworth spent the next few years traveling around Europe and the United States at his own expense to explore the treatment and condition of the insane, epileptics and poor children. From this research, he wrote two books: The Insane in Foreign Countries and Care and Treatment of Epileptics. Many of his recommendations were later adopted by Craig Colony, a state epileptic hospital which he helped to establish in Western New York in 1896.

Letchworth served as President of the National Association for the Study of Epilepsy and the Care of Treatment of Epilepsy, and edited the Proceedings of its first Annual Meeting Letchworth Village in Thiells, New York was also named for Letchworth.

In addition, he was President of the First New York State Conference of Charities and Corrections, as well as President of the National Conference of Charities and Correction, held in St. Louis in 1884.

=== Glen Iris Estate ===
Although successful, Letchworth found the day-to-day operations of business burdensome. He sought refuge from the business world and decided to build a retreat estate. He settled on a location in former Seneca territory in Western New York. The Seneca people were pushed out of the area following the American Revolutionary War, as they had been allies of the defeated British. As a tourist, Letchworth visited the Sehgahunda Valley of the Genesee River in western New York. In 1859 he purchased his first tract of land near Portage Falls.

Letchworth hired noted landscape architect William Webster to design the grounds of the estate, and named it Glen Iris. He reportedly spent $500,000 improving the land. In 1906, he bequeathed his 1,000-acre (4 km^{2}) estate to New York state with the provision that the American Scenic and Historic Preservation Society serve as custodian of the land and allowing himself a life tenancy. It now makes up the heart of Letchworth State Park.

== Personal life ==
Letchworth died at Glen Iris on December 1, 1910.
