= Portageville, New York =

- hamlet
- Location within New York
- Coordinates: 42°34′11″N 78°02′24″W
- Country: United States
- State: New York
- County: Wyoming
- Elevation: 1,115 ft (340 m)
- Time zone: UTC-5 (Eastern (EST))
  - Summer (DST): UTC-4 (EDT)
- ZIP code: 14536
- Area code: 585
- GNIS feature ID: 960982

Portageville is a hamlet located in the town of Genesee Falls in Wyoming County, New York, United States. Its name derives from the Native American canoeists who would withdraw their craft from the river to avoid going over three waterfalls in the Genesee River gorge now known as Portage Falls. They had to portage several miles to the site of present-day Mount Morris, where they could embark for the rest of the journey downriver.

Portageville is the only named community in the town of Genesee Falls.

The Genesee River Gorge with its scenic waterfalls was formed after the original valley was buried in glacial debris from the last ice age and the river had to cut a new valley though the Devonian sedimentary rock of the area. It has also been called The Grand Canyon of the East. The site has now been designated Letchworth State Park and is a major tourist attraction, with the lower entrance at Portage.

The First Universalist Church of Portageville, also known as The Portageville Chapel, is a historic Universalist church in Portageville, Wyoming County, New York. It is a Greek Revival style structure with Gothic and Federal elements dating to 1841. The church features a two-stage square tower above the north gable of the building.

== See also ==
- Portage (town), New York
