= WXXI =

WXXI may refer to:

- WXXI (AM), a radio station (1370 AM) licensed to Rochester, New York, United States
- WXXI-FM, a radio station (105.9 FM) licensed to Rochester, New York, United States
- WXXI-TV, a television station (channel 22, virtual 21) licensed to Rochester, New York
- WXXO (FM), a radio station (91.5 FM) licensed to Rochester, New York, which brands as "WXXI Classical" and held the call sign WXXI-FM from 1973 to 2023
- WXXI Public Broadcasting Council, organization that owns the above-listed stations

== See also ==
- WXII-TV, a North Carolina television station
