= Pomme Fritz =

Studio album by the Orb
- Released: 13 June 1994
- Recorded: 1993–94
- Genres: Ambient techno; avant-garde; experimental
- Length: 41:31
- Label: Island
- Producers: The Orb; Thomas Fehlmann

The Orb chronology
Live 93 (1993)	Pomme Fritz (1994)	Orbus Terrarum (1995)

Pomme Fritz (subtitled The Orb's Little Album) is a mini-album by the British electronic music group the Orb. It was released on 13 June 1994 through Island Records. Produced to sustain the group during a period of mismanagement, it was their first album with German producer Thomas Fehlmann.

The chaotic Pomme Fritz moved the group away from their melodic, ambient sound towards a more abstract, experimental style, incorporating instances of noise, sampling, fragmented rhythms, industrial textures, indecipherable voices, and sound collage techniques. Island Records "hated" the album and "didn't understand it at all", according to group leader Alex Paterson.

Upon its release, Pomme Fritz reached number six on the UK Albums Chart, but divided fans and critics, with some panning it as "doodling" and noting its absence of focus. However, Rolling Stone described it as an "aural feast" despite its "lack of cohesion" and direction. The album has seen more acclaim in recent times, and Paterson has described it as one of his favourite Orb albums.

== Background and production ==
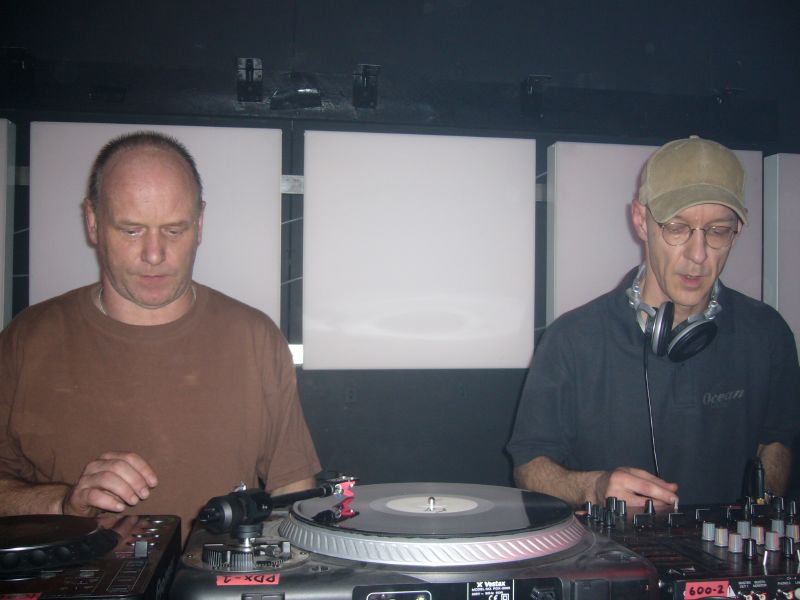
Pomme Fritz was the Orb's (pictured 2005) first album with Thomas Fehlmann (right).

In the early 1990s, The Orb pioneered the style ambient house, fusing dub basslines and house beats with atmospheric, psychedelic soundscapes. Their Top 30-charting debut album The Orb's Adventures Beyond the Ultraworld (1991) received critical acclaim, and this continued with their second album U.F.Orb (1992), which also saw the group's commercial zenith, reaching number one in the UK Albums Chart. Despite wishing to continue being prolific in 1993, the Orb's record label Big Life Records went against their wishes by re-releasing their early singles, and the group refused to release any new material until the cease and desist promise from the label and began looking to seek a new record contract. The Orb were subsequently signed to major label Island Records by their management. A stop-gap live album, Live 93, reached number 23 in the Albums Chart later that year.

Having recorded the 39-minute single "Blue Room", the Orb wanted to record a 41-minute album as their first studio record for Island. Their plan was to record one track and then "mix it down into six very different versions." Recorded in London and Berlin from 1993 to 1994 using an expensive budget on behalf of Island, Pomme Fritz was produced with ADAT (Alesis Digital Audio Tape), and group leader Alex Paterson also believes it to be the first Orb album to use ProTools, which was operated on a Mac. He later told PopMatters that the album was recorded when the Orb were being "used and abused by bad management" and his goal was to "keep the Orb's dream alive." Pomme Fritz was the Orb's first album with German techno producer Thomas Felhmann, who has remained a part-time member of the group. Kris Weston's role in the Orb, meanwhile, became greatly diminished, as he is credited only as an engineer.

== Composition ==
"Alles Ist Schoen" (1994)
An excerpt from the ambient-styled "Alles Ist Schoen".

Pomme Fritz sees the Orb abandon their melodic, ambient dub sound and accessible dance beats in favour of a more aggressive sound, pursuing a more experimental, industrial direction with more upfront percussion and beats, although the album is largely beat-free. It is characterised by lithe, fragmented rhythms, airy sounds, usage of sampling, industrial textures, unfocused noises and an absence of easily discernible melodies, with many of the tracks incorporating ambient techno characteristics, scrambled voices, noise, clattering metal sounds and "short-circuiting machines." Techno elements also appear courtesy of Fehlmann's contributions. A calmly intoned found vocal sample referring to a "heavy session of electroshock therapy" that wipes the listeners' "childhood traumas" at the expense of "most of your personality" appears three times throughout the album, an example of the group's black humour that also reflects the album's "often soothing chaos and ambient disorganisation."

Opening track "Pomme Fritz (Meat 'N Veg)" is reminiscent of krautrock and is constructed around chimes with overlapping elliptical guitar and low frequency bass figures. Snippets of Steve Reich's Music for Mallet Instruments are believed to be sampled on the song. The following tracks are more abstract and closer to noise, with the second and third tracks "More Gills Less Fishcakes" and "We're Pastie to Be Grill You" being the Orb's most experimental works to date, with unintelligible vocal samples and 'wheezing' synthesiser lines. The latter track is a musique concrète, multi-speed voice collage that uses only treated and cut-up vocals and features no instrumentation or beats. "Bang 'er 'N' Chips" features shuffling beats, surrealist 'sound bytes' and "calliope keyboards," curating what one critic described as a "sinister carnival romp." "Alles Ist Schoen" features ambient grooves, while the closing track "His Immortal Logness" is a simplistic, childlike tune that displays the group's "optimistic edge" within its organ motif, which surfaces in synth parts during "teeming noise pastiches."

== Release ==
"You've just had a heavy dose of electro-shock therapy and you're more relaxed than you've been in weeks. All those childhood traumas magically wiped away...along with most of your personality."

— The recurring vocal sample that appears throughout Pomme Fritz, and also used in its promotion.

According to Paterson, the Orb locked Island's A&R staff member in their studio with an acid tab to listen to Pomme Fritz after its completion. He reflected: "An hour later he came out and said, 'This is godlike – I have to have it', and this was his first release for Island." Paterson nonetheless recalled that the rest of Island Records "hated" the album and "didn't understand it at all," being confused by its lack of single material, and even after the release of Live 93 and Pomme Fritz, the label complained that the Orb had yet delivered them a sufficient album. Writer Sean O'Neal reflected in 2001: "It always blew my mind that Island, a major label, released Pomme Fritz."

Prior to release, Stuart Maconie wrote that, due to the Orb being one of the "shaping influences of their times," Pomme Fritz – the Orb's first release of new material for two years – became eagerly awaited. As is evident by its subtitle The Orb's Little Album, The Orb were keen to point out that Pomme Fritz was not their comeback album proper, and due to it being a "little album," it retailed at a cheap price below the standard for full-length CDs. The electroshock-centred vocal sample from the album was written out and used at the centre of the album's advertisements in the music press, along with a tagline that referred to the album's tracks as "ambient soundscapes." Although no singles were released from the album, it debuted and peaked at number 6 in the UK Albums Chart, making it one of the group's highest charting albums, although it only stayed on the chart for six weeks, a slight decline upon the nine-week chart run of the chart-topping U.F.Orb.

On 24 June 2008, a "Remastered and Expanded" edition of the album was released by Universal Music, containing a bonus disc of five bonus remixes. According to one writer: "The remixes here, including a typically fluid reinterpretation by Thomas Fehlmann, provide further genetic mutations of Pomme Fritz's strange lifeforms."

== Critical reception ==
Professional ratings
Review scores
Source	Rating
AllMusic	3/5 stars
The Encyclopedia of Popular Music	3/5 stars
The Great Rock Discography	6/10
Rolling Stone	3/5 stars
The Rolling Stone Record Guide	2.5/5 stars
Select	3/5 medals
Smash Hits	4/5 stars
Spin Alternative Record Guide	6/10

Pomme Fritz challenged the Orb's fan base, and similarly perplexed critics. Stuart Maconie of Select was moderately favourable. He called the album an "interesting half hour plus" and felt it was something of "an aural teaser ad" to subsequent material. He highlighted "Pomme Fritz (Meat 'N Veg)" as the album's finest track, and felt the other tracks were an "amorphous series of variations" upon it. Jon Wiederhorn of Rolling Stone described the album as an "aural feast," and felt that the Orb "inspire awe by splashing a profusion of unfocused noises and samples across a grid of billowing, textured synth lines," instead of "[engendering] hypnosis through minimalism and repetition" like other ambient groups. He did however note a "lack of cohesion" which makes the album feel incomplete. Pomme Fritz was picked as a "Staff Selection" in Spin, where Joe Stowe noted the "creepier" direction, "futzing and splooging everything from (what sounds like) Hindi ululations to the Nuremberg rally across six soundscapes to the extremely fugged of head."

Among retrospective reviews; Derek Walmsley of The Quietus felt the album was one of the Orb's "greatest achievements," describing it as a "concise yet bewilderingly multi-layered statement." In The Rough Guide to Rock, Daniel Jacobs and David Wren chose Pomme Fritz as one of the Orb's best albums, calling it their "least ambient" record. James Ferguson of Trouser Press, who felt the album seemed "vaguely angry" and bore an "impenetrable gloom," wrote that it was "glaringly obvious that Paterson had grown weary of the music that he helped to codify," while Resident Advisor felt the album "[tested] the boundaries of electronica." An editor in the Rolling Stone Album Guide feels the album "[doodles] amiably" and is largely short on ideas but praises the "charming" title track. Audio felt the album, with its "bleak industrial tones," pinpointed where Paterson began to "lose his way." John Bush of AllMusic similarly felt that the album provided the first hint "that the Orb might have taken their work a bit too far," and considered "Alles Ist Schoen", with its "beautiful ambient grooves", to be the album's highlight.

== Legacy and aftermath ==
"Weary of expectations to continue recording in the vein of 'Little Fluffy Clouds' and 'Blue Room', Pomme Fritz is the sound of The Orb testing the boundaries of electronica."

— Resident Advisor

Critics dispirited by Paterson's direction on Pomme Fritz began to unfavourably compare him to "acid casualty" Syd Barrett of Pink Floyd, and the album ultimately became the first of several "perplexing and difficult" albums that challenged the Orb's closest fans, followed shortly by the accompanying side-project album FFWD (1994), which continued to split fans between those enjoying their new direction and those who "cried over the loss of old Orb," according to the Spin Alternative Record Guide. FFWD, a collaboration between Paterson, Weston and Fehlmann of the Orb and guitarist Robert Fripp, saw Weston briefly return to a musician's role within the Orb, before he left the group to focus on his solo material.

Rob Young of The Wire described Pomme Fritz as one of the Orb's lesser known and more experimental records. Ambient producer Robert Rich is a fan of Pomme Fritz and cited it as one of several Orb albums where Paterson "breaks his own recipe." In an interview with The Wire, Richard Norris of Psychic TV compared "We're Pastie to Be Grill You" to Brian Eno and the Residents, and its intro to Joe Meek's "I Hear a New World". Paterson would later refer to Pomme Fritz as a personal favourite, "an album for real Orb fans" and as "the forgotten Orb album." In an interview with Paterson, Sean O'Neil of Philadelphia City Paper felt that the album was "amazing" and "extraordinarily ahead of its time," while Paterson himself concurred it was "about five years too early." Reflecting upon the album to Jonny Mugwump of The Quietus, who called the album "really out-there processed noise," Paterson said:

You know, we got such criticism for it, but it also acted as a clear-out for the fans - who was going to leave and who was going to stay with us. We keep moving, and this led to a more melodic strain with Orbus Terrarum, which still had post-industrial ambience slammed all over it with the old dub style. [...] It got crazy – we had done a double live album and then this mini album, and Island were still saying we hadn't done an album yet. Then we found out that our management had ripped us off for an amount of money that you wouldn't believe, and so, yeah, there was a lot of bad things going on. So Fritz was made in this antagonistic fashion – it was as punk as we got, other than doing "No Fun" for John Peel.

== Track listing ==
=== Side one ===
1. "Pomme Fritz (Meat 'n Veg)" – 9:04
2. "More Gills Less Fishcakes" – 8:05
3. "We're Pastie to Be Grill You" – 7:15

=== Side two ===
1. "Bang 'Er 'n Chips" – 7:47
2. "Alles Ist Schoen" – 7:17
3. "His Immortal Logness" – 2:03
