= Kris Weston =

British electronic musician

- Also known as: Thrash
- Born: Kristian Weston; 1972 (age 53–54)
- Origin: London, England
- Genres: Electronic
- Occupations: Musician, producer, remixer
- Instruments: Keyboards, guitar
- Years active: 1990–present
- Formerly of: The Orb

Kristian "Kris" Weston (a.k.a. Thrash) (born 1972) is a British electronic musician, producer and remixer best known for his work as a member of the Orb. Around the beginning of his career, he worked with Andrew Weatherall on remixes of Meat Beat Manifesto, remixed for Primal Scream, Saint Etienne, U2 and others. He was still a teen when working on the first few albums by the Orb.

Thrash was with the Orb for around five years, during their most popular period from around 1990 to the end of 1995. He appeared on the Orb albums and the many remixes they did during this period, including the album FFWD, a collaboration with Robert Fripp that is credited to Fripp, Thomas Fehlmann, Weston, and Alex Paterson. He also worked with Fortran 5 on their first album Blues.

== Career ==
=== Late 1980s – early 1990s ===
In 1990 and 1991, Weston performed remixes for many pop groups including Depeche Mode, Miranda Sex Garden, and Bananarama under the name Thrash.

=== The Orb ===
In 1991 while working as a studio engineer, Kris Weston was invited by Alex Paterson to accompany him in live performances of the Orb. His technical abilities allowed the Orb to craft panoramic sounds portraying aspects of space travel, especially the launch of Apollo 11 in their album The Orb's Adventures Beyond The Ultraworld.

Paterson and Weston wrote their next single, "Blue Room". Assisting with the recording was bassist Jah Wobble, keyboardist Miquette Giraudy, and guitarist Steve Hillage. This led to Weston and Paterson appearing on Top of the Pops where they played a game of chess in space suits with "Blue Room" playing in the background. He brought his technical and creative expertise to the Eno-influenced ambience on U.F.Orb.

Weston and Paterson, along with Robert Fripp and Thomas Fehlmann worked on the FFWD. Soon after the release of FFWD in August 1994, Weston suddenly quit the Orb to pursue his own projects. Paterson stated that Weston's departure was due to Weston's desire to have more control over the Orb's projects.

However, in an interview with i-D, Weston reportedly attributed the split to Paterson, saying that Paterson "never did 50% of the work."

=== Post-Orb ===
In the early 2000s, Weston produced and remixed for Japanese music artist and singer Coppé. In 2003, Thrash formed Justablip Records, an Open Source/Creative Commons license style music label.

== Discography ==
=== Orb albums with Kris Weston ===
- The Orb's Adventures Beyond the Ultraworld (1991), UK #29
- Aubrey Mixes: The Ultraworld Excursions (1991)
- U.F.Orb (1992), UK #1
- Live 93 (1993), UK #23
- Pomme Fritz (1994), UK #6
- FFWD (1994) The Orb and Robert Fripp
- Orbus Terrarum (1995), UK #20
- Auntie Aubrey's Excursions Beyond the Call of Duty (1996)
- Auntie Aubrey's Excursions Beyond the Call of Duty Part 2 (2002)

=== Justablip Records discography ===
- BLIP001/BLIP 23CD : Various Artists WTF? Madonna Remix Project (2003)
- BLIP002 : Weapons of Mass Destruction (2004)
- BLIP003 : Petrol Observer Good Luck, Cunt/Iscream (2004)
- BLIP004 : The War Against Terror Go back to bed America (2004)
