= WITH (FM) =

Simulcast of WRUR-FM, Rochester
- Ithaca, New York; United States
- Broadcast area: Ithaca, New York
- Frequency: 90.1 MHz (HD Radio)
- Branding: The Route

Programming
- Format: Adult album alternative
- Subchannels: HD2: Classical
- Affiliations: National Public Radio; Pacifica Radio; Public Radio International; American Public Media

Ownership
- Owner: Hobart and William Smith Colleges
- Operator: WXXI Public Broadcasting Council
- Sister stations: WRUR-FM, WEOS, WHWS-LP, WXXI (AM), WXXI-FM

History
- First air date: May 24, 2010
- Call sign meaning: Ithaca

Technical information
- Licensing authority: FCC
- Facility ID: 86349
- Class: A
- ERP: 2,000 watts
- HAAT: 87.3 metres (286 ft)
- Transmitter coordinates: 42°34′55″N 76°33′22″W

Links
- Public license information: Public file; LMS
- Webcast: Listen Live
- Website: www.withradio.org

WITH (90.1 FM) is a public, listener-supported radio station serving Ithaca, New York and the surrounding area airing an Adult Album Alternative format identical to that of WRUR-FM in Rochester branded as The Route. It is owned in a partnership between Rochester's WXXI Public Broadcasting Council and Hobart and William Smith Colleges and went on the air on May 24, 2010. The station has a full-time classical service on WITH-HD2
