= WJSL =

WJSL may refer to:

- WJSL-LP, a defunct low-power radio station (100.7 FM) formerly licensed to serve Southport, North Carolina, United States
- WXXY, a radio station (90.3 FM) licensed to serve Houghton, New York, United States, which held the call sign WJSL from until 2009
