= Chris Hastings (media executive) =

American public media executive and documentary producer

- Born: Chester, Pennsylvania, U.S.
- Education: Kutztown University of Pennsylvania (BS); American University (MA)
- Occupations: Public media executive, documentary producer, educator
- Years active: 1990s–present
- Employer: WXXI Public Media
- Known for: Co-creator of America ReFramed; Executive Producer of WORLD Channel; President and CEO of WXXI
- Title: President and CEO

Chris Hastings is an American public media executive, Peabody Award–winning documentary producer, and educator. He is the president and chief executive officer of WXXI Public Media in Rochester, New York, a position he assumed in November 2024. Previously, he served for more than 12 years as executive producer and editor-in-chief of the WORLD Channel at GBH in Boston, where he co-created the Peabody- and duPont–Columbia–winning documentary series America ReFramed.

Hastings is the recipient of a Peabody Award, an Alfred I. duPont–Columbia University Award, a News & Documentary Emmy Award, an International Documentary Association Award, three regional Emmy Awards, and multiple Telly Awards. In 2024, he received the American Documentary Industry Trailblazer Award for his commitment to elevating diverse voices in documentary filmmaking.

== Early life and education ==
Hastings grew up in the Springfield Township area near Chester, Pennsylvania, outside Philadelphia, and is a 1992 graduate of Springfield High School. He began his television career at age 10, producing Kids News, a daily news program at his elementary school.

He earned a Bachelor of Science in telecommunications from Kutztown University of Pennsylvania and a Master of Arts in film from American University in Washington, D.C.

== Career ==
=== Black Entertainment Television ===
Hastings began his professional career at Black Entertainment Television (BET), where he was a member of the founding team behind BET Tonight (later BET Tonight with Tavis Smiley), a news talk show focused on issues within the Black community.

=== GBH ===
Hastings spent more than 20 years at GBH (formerly WGBH) in Boston, the largest producer of content for PBS.

Early in his tenure, he worked on the PBS children's series ZOOM and contributed to post-production on several GBH local public affairs programs, including Greater Boston, Basic Black, and La Plaza.

He later led the WGBH Lab, an incubator for emerging filmmakers and content creators, which earned three New England Emmy Awards for its Open Call program.

==== WORLD Channel ====
In 2011, Hastings became executive producer and editor-in-chief of the WORLD Channel, a multicast public television channel jointly operated by GBH and WNET. He co-created the documentary series America ReFramed in 2012, in partnership with American Documentary Inc., as well as the series Local, USA and Doc World.

Under his editorial leadership, WORLD Channel productions received a Peabody Award for Deej (2017), an Alfred I. duPont–Columbia University Award for Class of '27 (2018), a News & Documentary Emmy Award for Outstanding Politics and Government Documentary for Armed with Faith (2019), and an International Documentary Association Award for Best TV Feature Documentary or Mini-Series for Fannie Lou Hamer's America: An America ReFramed Special (2022). In 2022, the series won 17 Telly Awards, including gold awards for Five Years North and Where The Pavement Ends.

In 2019, Hastings secured a three-year, $600,000 grant from the MacArthur Foundation and a $150,000 grant from the Wyncote Foundation to transition WORLD Channel from an acquirer to an early-stage co-producer of independent documentary films.

Hastings oversaw the channel's rebrand initiative and cultivated partnerships with national minority media organizations, including Black Public Media, the Center for Asian American Media, Pacific Islanders in Communications, Vision Maker Media, and the Independent Television Service.

=== WXXI Public Media ===
In September 2024, Hastings was named president and CEO of WXXI Public Media in Rochester, New York, succeeding Norm Silverstein, who had led the organization for nearly 29 years. He is the third CEO in WXXI's history.

WXXI's portfolio includes WXXI-TV (PBS), WXXI-AM and WXXI-FM (NPR and classical music), WXXI News, The Little Theatre (an art house cinema), and CITY magazine.

Upon joining WXXI, Hastings stated: "Joining WXXI and coming to Rochester is more than just a career move — it's a chance to be part of a community-focused organization that understands the transformative power of local media."

==== Leadership initiatives ====
Hastings has pursued a strategy of positioning WXXI as a production hub and creative economy anchor in Rochester. Under his leadership, WXXI achieved record membership income of $5.3 million and added 1,600 new members.

He has expanded WXXI's production studio operations, making facilities available to independent podcasters and other media creators, and has explored journalism partnerships with local outlets including the Rochester Beacon and the Democrat and Chronicle.

In December 2025, Hastings announced a reorganization consolidating WXXI into four core divisions: Content; Marketing and Revenue; Technology; and Business Affairs. Key hires included Julio Saenz as WXXI's first chief content officer (August 2025), Mona Isler as chief of staff (July 2025), and Kevin Kalvitis as WXXI's first chief marketing officer (January 2026).

==== Federal funding crisis ====
In May 2025, Hastings issued a public statement responding to a White House executive order seeking to eliminate federal funding for public broadcasting through the Corporation for Public Broadcasting (CPB). In July 2025, the U.S. House approved a rescissions package cutting $1.1 billion in CPB funding over two years; WXXI stood to lose $1.9 million annually, approximately 15 percent of its operating budget. Hastings identified PBS Kids educational programming, classical music broadcast licensing, and the WXXI newsroom as the three most at-risk areas.

In January 2026, the CPB board voted to dissolve. Hastings described the news as "devastating" and called CPB "a vital backbone of our system." Despite the funding loss, WXXI's record membership growth helped offset the shortfall, and Hastings stated: "WXXI is not retreating."

== Teaching ==
Hastings has served as an adjunct professor at Emerson College in Boston, teaching in its MFA program.

== Awards and honors ==
- Peabody Award, for Deej (America ReFramed, 2017)
- Alfred I. duPont–Columbia University Award, for Class of '27 (America ReFramed, 2018)
- News & Documentary Emmy Award, Outstanding Politics and Government Documentary, for Armed with Faith (2019)
- International Documentary Association Award, Best TV Feature Documentary or Mini-Series, for Fannie Lou Hamer's America: An America ReFramed Special (2022)
- NAMIC Vision Award, Best Documentary, for Fannie Lou Hamer's America (2023)
- 17 Telly Awards for America ReFramed (2022)
- Three New England Emmy Awards, for the WGBH Lab Open Call program
- American Documentary Industry Trailblazer Award (2024)
- Rockwood Leadership Institute JustFilms Fellow (2016)
- GBH Margaret and Hans Rey Curious George Producer Fellowship
- Alumnus, The Partnership Inc., a leadership incubator for executives of color (Boston)
- Springfield Area Educational Foundation Arts Hall of Fame inductee (2019)

== Speaking engagements ==
Hastings has been a featured speaker and panelist at major documentary and media industry events, including Hot Docs, SXSW, AFI Docs, DOC NYC, the Nordisk Film Forum, the Australian Documentary Conference, and the NALIP Media Summit.

== Community involvement ==
- Board member, Community Art Center (Cambridge, Massachusetts)
- Board chair, Justice For My Sister (Los Angeles)
