= WGMC =

Jazz music public radio station in Greece–Rochester, New York

Coordinates: 43.245°N 77.693°W

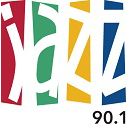
- Greece, New York; United States
- Broadcast area: Rochester, New York and the surrounding area
- Frequency: 90.1 MHz
- Branding: Jazz90.1

Programming
- Format: Jazz, Ethnic
- Affiliations: United Stations Radio Networks; NBC News Radio; National Public Radio

Ownership
- Owner: Jazz90.1, Inc.; Greece Central School District

History
- First air date: November 1, 1973
- Call sign meaning: W Greece Media Center

Technical information
- Licensing authority: FCC
- Class: B1
- ERP: 15,000 watts
- HAAT: 42 metres (138 ft)

Links
- Public license information: Public file; LMS
- Webcast: Listen Live
- Website: jazz901.org

WGMC (90.1 FM) is a listener-supported station licensed to Greece, New York and serving Rochester, New York. It airs a Jazz radio format. On air, the station is identified as "Jazz 90.1" in reference to its FM frequency. WGMC specializes in all styles of jazz, but is also an important outlet for music and voices that do not make it onto commercial radio.

Owned by the Greece Central School District but operated independently, the WGMC studios are located in the Greece Olympia High School media center.

== Programming ==
Alongside standard jazz, the station hosts a blues show on Sunday evenings, a soul jazz program (The Soul Jazz Spectrum) on Friday nights, a program of avant-garde jazz (Northstar Sounds) on Tuesday nights, and other specialty shows featuring subgenres of jazz. The station also airs NPR's Jazz Night in America.

On June 6, 2009, WGMC added its first call-in talk show, Sound Bytes, which had previously been broadcast on WHAM and WXXI and airs on Saturdays. Other than Sound Bytes, the station also airs ethnic programming during the day on the weekends including Saturday Polka! w/ Jimmy Sturr and The German Program.

When Rochester's other jazz station WJZR left the air on July 10, 2022 upon the owner's retirement, WGMC became the Rochester market's only full time jazz station. After the demise of WJZR, some shows formerly broadcast on that station such as JazzTrax with Art Good moved to WGMC.

The station currently produces Make Believe Ballroom, a program that originated in New York City on WNEW in 1935 and ran until 1992 when that station changed its format.

== Disc jockeys/online personalities ==
WGMC's regular DJs and on-air personalities include:

- Derrick Lucas
- Mike Velazquez
- Phil Dodd
- Rob Linton (station manager)
- Lynda Wildman
- Dan Gross
- Otto Bruno
- Rick Petrie
- Jon Greenbaum
- Matt Shackelford
- Jake Longwell
- Scott Ferris
- Rankin Shaver
- Brian King
- Steve Pearl
- Nate Jones
- Alan Colletta
- Sally Poole
- Kyle Jameson
- Andy Heinze
- Tom Pethic
- Max Wheeler
- Cory Halloran
- Hal Johnson
- Dave Tomaselli
- Chuck Ingersoll
- Jeff Harris (Big Road Blues)
- The hosts of Sound Bytes: Nick Francesco, Dave Enright, and Steve Rea.

== See also ==
- List of jazz radio stations in the United States
