= WRUR-FM =

Coordinates: 43.135°N 77.584°W

- Rochester, New York; United States
- Frequency: 88.5 MHz (HD Radio)
- Branding: The Route

Programming
- Format: AAA
- Affiliations: National Public Radio

Ownership
- Owner: University of Rochester; (University of Rochester Broadcast Corp.)
- Sister stations: WITH

History
- First air date: 1948 / 1965 for FM (at 90.1)
- Former frequencies: 90.1 MHz (1965–1969)
- Call sign meaning: Radio at the University of Rochester

Technical information
- Licensing authority: FCC
- Facility ID: 69138
- Class: B1
- ERP: 15,100 watts
- HAAT: 115.3 meters

Links
- Public license information: Public file; LMS
- Webcast: Listen live
- Website: wrur.org

WRUR-FM (88.5 FM) is a public radio station owned by the University of Rochester in Rochester, New York. The station broadcasts an Adult Album Alternative format and carries NPR news programming.

WRUR-FM partners with WXXI Public Broadcasting Council to provide programming to the Rochester area. Its programs can also be heard in Ithaca on WITH (90.1 FM). The station's transmitter is located on Rochester's Pinnacle Hill.

== Technical history ==
WRUR began as a low-power AM radio station on 650 kHz in the fall of 1948, broadcasting from the university campus. In 1950, its studios moved from the U of R campus to the Eastman School of Music. Studios moved again in 1955 to the university's Todd Union basement, where most broadcasts originate today. The FCC granted a license in 1965 to WRUR-FM, broadcasting on a frequency of 90.1 MHz using a 10 watt transmitter. In February 1969, power increased to 5,000 watts. Power was reduced and the frequency changed to 88.5 MHz later that year. In February 1970, power increased to 20,000 watts, but interfered with on-campus chemistry experiments, and power was again reduced until 1975 when the chemistry department moved. In 1993, the transmitter location moved to the downtown Hyatt Regency Rochester hotel and power increased to 3,000 watts with a new antenna atop the building. It stayed there until 2007 when the transmitter and antenna was moved to WXXI's tower on Pinnacle Hill as part of the partnership with them, increasing the coverage area. In 2011, WRUR was granted a power increase to 15.1 kilowatts and an increase in antenna height. The Corporation for Public Broadcasting has also awarded WXXI a Digital Conversion Grant, to facilitate converting WRUR to IBOC, as part of the power increase, with a new transmitter and new panel antenna.

== Content and management history ==
For most of its existence, WRUR was staffed and run almost entirely by students with minimal input from University administrators. Content was largely eclectic and free-form, and included shows such as "Jazz in the Morning," the "Folk Lunch," a weekend late-night dance music show called "Club 88," Saturday and Sunday morning classical music shows, and progressive music programming on weekday afternoons.

The former logo of WRUR

This changed around 2004 when school administrators took a more active role in station management and forged a partnership with WXXI in response to the FCC's crackdown on indecency violations, among other factors. This took most FM programming decisions out of the hands of students. The station today is primarily a AAA-formatted music station. Open Tunings with Scott Regan is a flagship music program on the station.

For many years, as part of its partnership with WXXI, WRUR aired programs from WXXI-AM such as Connections and All Things Considered, this ended in July 2023, shortly after WXXI launched WXXI-FM, putting WXXI's talk programs on a strong FM signal and eliminating the need to air those programs on WRUR. This led to WRUR and the co-programmed WITH airing Morning Edition in the mornings becoming full time music stations re-branded as The Route with the addition of World Cafe and other music programming in the former WXXI talk programming timeslots.

The University of Rochester students maintain an active presence in the evening on the FM station during the academic year and a more vibrant online presence under the name The Sting. Additionally, around 2014, the University of Rochester's TV club, URTV, merged into WRUR to form WRUR-TV, a TV station that broadcasts on the university's cable TV system and puts out videos on YouTube.
