= WHWS-LP =

Coordinates: 42.858°N 76.989°W

- Geneva, New York; United States
- Broadcast area: Finger Lakes
- Frequency: 105.7 MHz
- Branding: Hobart and William Smith College Radio

Programming
- Languages: Spanish, English
- Format: Spanish; alternative
- Affiliations: Radio Bilingüe

Ownership
- Owner: Hobart and William Smith Colleges
- Sister stations: WEOS, WITH

History
- Former call signs: WSAC-LP (2002–2008)
- Call sign meaning: Hobart and William Smith Colleges

Technical information
- Licensing authority: FCC
- Class: L1
- ERP: 100 watts
- HAAT: 13.9 meters (46 ft)

Links
- Public license information: LMS
- Webcast: www.whws.fm/listen
- Website: www.whws.fm

WHWS-LP (105.7 FM) is a low power FM (LPFM) radio station operated by Hobart and William Smith Colleges and broadcasting to Geneva, New York. It is primarily staffed by the students of HWS. The station was first owned by the Finger Lakes Regional Arts Council which manages The Smith Opera House in Geneva. The license was transferred to Hobart and William Smith Colleges on April 24, 2015. Hobart and William Smith Colleges also holds the license for WEOS in Geneva, which is primarily an NPR news/talk station operated in conjunction with the WXXI Public Broadcasting Council.

== History ==
WHWS-LP was originally applied for as WSAC-LP as a LPFM (low powered FM) license and had a variety of different, sporadic, shows. Eventually the station was organized around having Radio Bilingüe as its core programming, and began continuous operations as such towards the end of 2007. In January 2008, a fully functional studio was brought on-line in conjunction with WEOS and full operations commenced with HWS student programming intermixed with Radio Bilingüe.

The call letters were still WSAC-LP ("Smith Arts Council") in early 2008 due to some minor bureaucratic delays; the "WHWS" call letters were originally assigned by the FCC, via the US Coast Guard, to a defunct World War II naval vessel. But in mid-May 2008, the change to WHWS-LP became official.

The WHWS air studio

== Programming ==
=== Radio Bilingüe ===
From midnight until 10am weekdays, and all day Saturday and Sunday, WHWS-LP is an affiliate station of the satellite service Radio Bilingüe, which is primarily based in Fresno, California.

=== Local programming ===
From 10am to midnight weekdays (and some other times), WHWS-LP broadcasts a medley of local programming, from rock/alternative, hip-hop, modern rock, classic rock, CHR, jazz, world and other genres. Programming at the discretion of the DJ, who is often a HWS student. If no live DJ is present, an Enco DAD automation system plays from the latest selection of music that the station receives from a variety of music labels.

Fridays at the Scandling Cafe

WHWS also has specialty programming, such as Fridays at the Scandling Cafe, a two-hour live broadcast every Friday at lunchtime from the HWS Scandling Center. A rotating staff of student DJ's man this shift.

Throughout the school year, WHWS broadcasts a variety of live sports programming featuring Hobart Statesmen and William Smith Herons' lacrosse, football, basketball, soccer, field hockey and ice hockey teams.

Additionally, the WHWS studios are the home of HermitRadio, which produces and syndicates the weekly shows Stuck in the Psychedelic Era and Rockin' in the Days of Confusion to dozens of stations nationwide.

WHWS also broadcasts Geneva community events, like Candidate's Forums and City Council meetings.

Students DJing a show on WHWS

=== Rebroadcast ===
WHWS occasionally rebroadcasts some special programming that WEOS has previously aired, including:

- The Fisher Center Lecture Series
- President's Forum
- The President's Radio Show
- HWS Commencement

=== Special days ===
WHWS also sometimes switches formats for special days, such as HWS Orientation Weekend in late August each year, when WHWS becomes a quasi-highway advisory radio station, broadcasting a loop of scheduled events, weather and driving directions for incoming first-year students and their parents. (informing the local community, as well)
