= WEO =

WEO may refer to:

- World Economic Outlook, a half-yearly publication published by International Monetary Fund
- World Energy Outlook, an annual publication
- World Eskimo Indian Olympics, formerly known as the World Eskimo Olympics

== See also ==
- WEOS, call letters for a radio station in Geneva, New York
- Weo, a settlement in Nauru
