= Auntie Aubrey's Excursions Beyond the Call of Duty =

Remix album by the Orb
- Released: 1996
- Genre: Ambient; chill-out
- Length: 2:39:43
- Label: Deviant; Ultra

The Orb remix album chronology
Aubrey Mixes: The Ultraworld Excursions (1991)	Auntie Aubrey's Excursions Beyond the Call of Duty (1996)	Auntie Aubrey's Excursions Beyond the Call of Duty Part 2 (2001)

Professional ratings
Review scores
Source	Rating
AllMusic	4/5 stars
Muzik	3.5/5 stars

Auntie Aubrey's Excursions Beyond the Call of Duty is a remix compilation by English electronic music group the Orb originally released in the UK in 1996 as a mono, limited edition 2-CD/4-LP/2-cassette set. The running order varied slightly between the different formats and there were several discrepancies between the actual tracks and those noted on the sleeves. The CD tracklisting is reproduced below. It was re-released five years later in the UK and U.S., with an amended track listing and some in stereo, as a 2-CD set. Its sequel, Auntie Aubrey's Excursions Beyond the Call of Duty Part 2 appeared at the same time.

The original release had Depeche Mode's "Happiest Girl", Erasure's "Ship of Fools", Primal Scream's "Higher Than the Sun", and Lovekittens' "What Goes On". These were later substituted for David A. Stewart and Candy Dulfer's "Lily Was Here", and Marathon's "Movin".

== 1996 (mono) track listing ==
=== Disc 1 ===
1. Material - "Mantra" (Praying Mantra) (16:31)
2. Killing Joke - "Democracy" (The Russian Tundra Mix) (17:47)
3. Keiichi Suzuki - "Satellite Serenade" (Trans Asian Express Mix) (12:40)
4. Zodiac Youth - "Fast Forward the Future" (Bucket and Bong Mix) (7:18)
5. Primal Scream - "Higher Than the Sun" (Higher Than the Kite Mix) (8:47)
6. Readymade - "Ambient State" (0:48)
7. Wir - "So and Slow It Grows" (The Orb in Atlas Mix) (7:00)
8. Yasuaki Shimizu - "Secret Squirrel" (7:12)

=== Disc 2 ===
1. Yello - "You Gotta Say Yes to Another Excess" (Orb Extended Remix) (12:48)
2. Innersphere - "Out Of Body" (Logical Mix) (4:13)
3. Depeche Mode - "Happiest Girl" (Orbital Mix) (7:44)
4. Erasure - "Ship of Fools" (Orbital Southsea of Holy Beats Mix) (8:15)
5. Sun Electric - "O'Locco" (Orbital Therapy, Pt. 1) (5:31)
6. Maurizio - "Ploy" (Battersea Was an Island of Mud Mix) (11:56)
7. Time Unlimited - "Men of Wadodm" (Orbital Mix) (4:19)
8. Paradise X - "2 Much" (Start and Depart from Paradise Mix) (7:54)
9. Pop Will Eat Itself - "Home" (Home Sweet Home Orb Remix) (10:04)
10. Love Kittens - "What Goes On" (Orbient Mix 2) (5:24)

== 2001 track listing ==
=== Disc 1 ===
1. Material - "Praying Mantra" (16:58) – stereo
2. Killing Joke - "Democracy" (The Russian Tundra Mix) (19:09)
3. Suzuki K1 >> 7.5cc - "Satellite Serenade" (Trans Asian Express Mix) (13:56)
4. David A. Stewart featuring Candy Dulfer - "Lily Was Here" (Space Centre Medical Hum) (7:47)
5. Ready Made - "Ambient State" (1:06) – stereo
6. Wir - "So And Slow It Grows" (The Orb in Atlas Mix) (6:49)
7. Yasuaki Shimizu - Secret Squirrel (7:16)

=== Disc 2 ===
1. Yello - "You Gotta Say Yes to Another Excess" (Orb Goes the Weasel Mix) (12:51) - retitled for the re-release
2. Innersphere - "Out Of Body" (Logical Mix) (4:08) – stereo
3. Sun Electric - "O'Locco" (Orbital Therapy Part 1) (5:32)
4. Maurizio - "Ploy" (Battersea Was an Island of Mud Mix) (12:28)
5. Time Unlimited - "Men Of Wadodem" (Orbital Mix) (4:19)
6. Paradise X - "2 Much" (Start and Depart From Paradise Mix) (6:41)
7. Pop Will Eat Itself - "Home" (Home Sweet Home Orb Remix) (11:29)
8. Marathon - "Movin" (Ambientappella Live Mix) (8:42)
9. Zodiac Youth - "Fast Forward the Future" (Buckets and Bongs Mixture) (7:34)
