= WEOS =

- WEOS broadcast tower in Seneca/Gorham
- Geneva, New York; United States
- Broadcast area: Finger Lakes
- Frequency: 89.5 MHz (HD Radio)
- Branding: WEOS

Programming
- Format: adult album alternative; public radio
- Affiliations: American Public Media; National Public Radio; Pacifica Radio; Public Radio Exchange

Ownership
- Owner: Hobart and William Smith Colleges
- Sister stations: WHWS-LP; WITH

History
- First air date: 1971
- Former call signs: WEOS-FM (1971–1990)
- Former frequencies: 89.7 MHz (1971–2014)
- Call sign meaning: "Echo of the Seneca"

Technical information
- Licensing authority: FCC
- Facility ID: 65559
- Class: A
- ERP: 6,000 watts
- HAAT: 95 meters (312 ft)
- Translator: 90.3 W212BA (Geneva)

Links
- Public license information: Public file; LMS
- Webcast: Listen live
- Website: www.weos.org

WEOS (89.5 FM) is a public radio station licensed to Geneva, New York, broadcasting across the Finger Lakes region. In addition to its main frequency, the station broadcasts on a relay transmitter at 90.3 FM in Geneva.

WEOS, founded in 1949, is owned by the board of trustees of The Colleges of the Seneca, Inc., the legal name of Hobart and William Smith Colleges. The station's format is primarily public radio, with a focus on news/talk shows.

== Programming ==
WEOS is an affiliate of National Public Radio, Public Radio Exchange, American Public Media and Pacifica Radio. In addition, it acquires similar programming from the Public Radio Satellite System, the internet, and local sources.

WEOS also maintains an active "community calendar" listings of local events. The station also carries special broadcasts of lectures, panel discussions, symposiums and live concerts from arts centers and other colleges in its region.

Besides its news/talk/information programs, the station schedules a few hours of music shows on weekdays and several hours on weekends. Some programming is produced locally by volunteer community DJs and also Hobart and William Smith students.

== Broadcast range ==
WEOS reaches most of the central Finger Lakes region of New York State. There are two FM transmitters: a primary and a repeater or "translator" station. Both broadcast exactly the same programming.

- WEOS 89.5FM: (licensed to Geneva, New York) Located on a cellphone tower on Lake to Lake Road, near the village of Gorham, New York. Licensed for 6,000 watts effective radiated power (ERP) via a 3-bay/full-wavelength Shively 6810 antenna array. Uses a Harris Z8HDC transmitter to create a HD Radio digital signal. Serves the Finger Lakes region. Actual reception of WEOS can vary significantly with local terrain and the quality of receiver/antenna.
- W212BA 90.3FM: (licensed to Geneva, New York) Located on a tower on top of the Winn-Seeley Gymnasium on the Hobart and William Smith Colleges campus. Licensed for 88 watts ERP (omnidirectional) via a 4-bay/full-wavelength ERI antenna array. Currently operating under Special Temporary Authority from the Federal Communications Commission (FCC) to transmit 44 watts ERP. Uses a Larcan DRT01 & LA25 heterodyning transmitter to copy WEOS's 89.7FM signal and retransmit it on 90.3FM, also in HD Radio. Serves downtown Geneva and the HWS campus; if you are in those areas and having trouble receiving 89.5FM cleanly, try tuning in 90.3FM instead.

WITH 90.1FM: Related to WEOS is WITH 90.1FM (licensed to Ithaca, New York) broadcasting from the WSQG (WSKG) 90.9FM tower in North Lansing, with 1,000 watts ERP (omnidirectional). WITH broadcasts a separate programming schedule from WEOS, focusing mostly on Triple-A music. WITH is a partnership endeavor between WEOS and WXXI in Rochester.

== History: before NPR ==
WEOS started on May 6, 1949, as a carrier current radio station at Hobart and William Smith Colleges, primarily as a means of rebroadcasting recorded lectures from Western Civilization or other classes for students to either re-hear, or in some cases, hear for the first time if they missed class. However, there are records and citations that mention broadcast experiments and other related efforts in earlier years, one involving the broadcast of a Hobart and Union College football game in 1920.

The station was operated by students, many of whom were part of the Delta Chi fraternity. The station's studios were in Smith Hall, before moving to the basement of Sherrill Hall, where real broadcast studios were built in the 1960s. The studios remained there until 1998.

The station was granted a construction permit in 1970, for 91.3 MHz, at 10 watts ERP. However, this frequency would have precluded Syracuse from getting a public radio station (WCNY-FM). Through negotiation, the station applied for and changed its frequency to 89.7FM. The station went on the air in 1971, broadcasting a variety of programs both recorded and live, all forms of music, news, and sports, including those of NPR. The transmitter site was on the roof of Eaton Hall.

Through a series of power increases and improvements, the station increased its power and coverage in steps, first to 250 watts, then 460 watts, and finally 1500 watts. The latter moved the transmitter site and tower to the roof of Winn-Seeley Gymnasium in the mid-1970s. The station had an old RCA transmitter and a Phelps-Dodge 4-bay antenna.

In July 1988, lightning struck the antenna, and a fire destroyed the transmitter and related equipment. The transmitter was to be replaced and back on the air by the start of the school year, but the new transmitter was destroyed in-transit in a truck accident. The replacement transmitter did not arrive until mid December 1988. The Harris FM1-K was installed in a new location in Winn-Seeley gym, including its Optimod 8100A. The STL link was a buried multi-conductor shielded audio cable running from building to building from Sherrill Hall in the old Alpha System fire alarm conduit. The station used to run audio and voltages on these cables, in a home-built remote control. The advent of the new transmitter, and a new remote control, allowed for the stereo send/return audio from remote pickup transmitters (MARTI) and the data to use this cable, which when equalized, was flat from 15 Hz to 22 kHz!

In 1989, the antenna failed, and was replaced by an ERI 4-bay antenna, which is still used today for a translator, W212BA 90.3FM.

In 1994, The station applied for and was granted a construction permit to move the transmitter site off campus. For years, there was an effort to get the station's transmitter up on "Bean's Hill" to lessen multipath and help improve coverage. This came to pass with a move to Stanley, New York, on a tower site owned by Ontario County public safety. The station went on the air from that site briefly, before moving to a permanent new tower site directly behind the Ontario County Site on Lake to Lake Road. The ERP was raised to 4 KW, with a directional antenna, to protect co-channel WITR 89.7FM and adjacent channel WRVO 89.9FM. This greatly improved the WEOS coverage area, and added better coverage towards Ithaca.

About this time, The Colleges added W212BA, at 90.3FM at 88 watts to fill in the signal on the campus. This translator broadcasts from the old WEOS transmitter site on Winn Seeley Gym. In November 2007, W212BA was upgraded to broadcast in digital HD Radio.

WEOS was also on the air in Ithaca, at 88.1 FM, 245 watts ERP (directional) on W201CD, owned by Ithaca Community Radio, until May 2010.

On September 29, 2013, WEOS changed frequencies from 89.7FM to 89.5FM, increasing its ERP to 6KW non-directional. This resolved ongoing interference issues with WITR 89.7FM, Henrietta, New York and WRVO 89.9FM Oswego, New York. The station was licensed to cover at this frequency on February 19, 2014.

The Colleges also own WITH 90.1FM licensed to Ithaca, New York, at 1000 watts (non-directional/omni) from the WSQG 90.9FM tower in Lansing, north of Ithaca. WITH is operated in cooperation with WXXI Public Broadcasting Council as per an agreement announced on April 6, 2010. WITH broadcasts primarily a AAA music format.

== History: after NPR ==
The former "WEOS House", contained the studios and offices until Summer 2014.

Up until 1990, the station was at the will and whim of the students and community volunteers, as to when the station would sign on the air. In 1988, the Colleges' President, Carroll Brewster charged WEOS to become more consistent in its programming, and to pursue adding public radio programming. This was in part due to the adjacent channel issue caused with the main NPR news outlet at that time, WRVO. This was, in part, a mistake that the FCC made: allowing WRVO a power increase that actually interferes with WEOS. This interference still exists to this day, and the FCC did not remedy the error.

Due to the "gray area" of no "city-grade" (70 dBu) coverage of public radio in the Finger Lakes, WEOS was allowed to broadcast public radio programming from NPR and PRI as an auxiliary member station beginning in December 1990. WEOS also became a Pacifica Radio affiliate at that time.

At first, there was resistance from students, who equated "public radio" with classical music. However, resistance quickly went away when Gulf War I occurred, and WEOS became a primary source in the area for up-to-the-minute news and information. Around 1990 WEOS also started broadcasting 24-hours a day. WEOS's schedule was adjusted so that a bulk of its news and information programming is in the daytime, leaving the evening hours for music programming, by staff, students, and community volunteers. WEOS continues to produce the broadcast of visiting speakers, sporting events, live concerts, and other programming, including speakers at Cornell University.

The station's 24/7 non-commercial news and electric music format serves a potential audience of nearly 300,000 people, with a large percentage of the listenership in the Ithaca and southern Finger Lakes area. NPR News, Pacifica, APM. and PRX (formerly PRI) programming are a mainstay, with local music and other programming, including broadcasts of Hobart Statesmen and William Smith Heron athletic contests.

In 1998 the station's studios moved from Sherill Hall to a converted house at 113 Hamilton Street, remaining there until 2014, when both WEOS and sister station WHWS moved their studios to the Scandling Center on Pulteney Street.

In 2004, WEOS was the first station in western New York State to broadcast in HD radio digital audio broadcasting. In 2008, WEOS would expand its HD offering by converting the on-campus "repeater" station, 90.3FM W212BA, to HD radio broadcasting as well.

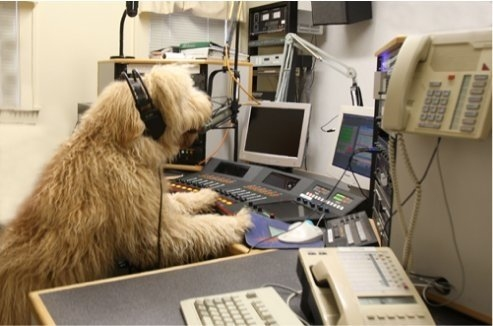
During Dublin's Day 2007, HWS President Mark Gearan's golden doodle, Dublin, visits WEOS

WEOS also originated broadcasts for the NCAA in the early 1990s of the Men's NCAA Lacrosse Championships. This continued in the 1990s, and the broadcasts were carried by radio stations both in the United States and worldwide, including Japan and Australia. WEOS uplinked the broadcasts to both the Public Radio Satellite and commercial satellite carriers. This effort started in 1992 in Philadelphia. WEOS has also distributed web-only broadcasts of various tournaments, including the NCAA Women's Field Hockey Championships, NCAA Women's Lacrosse Championships, and the ECAC Men's Division I Hockey Championships. WEOS has also fed the Liberty League Basketball Championships to the web, as web-only events.

WEOS was an early adopter of webcasting, using Webradio and Broadcast America for streaming. WEOS uses Public Interactive for its streaming, and also for web-based audio archives/podcasts.

Community and corporate contributions (often obtained during year-round quiet fund drives) have helped the station grow in its ability to produce more local coverage and support the addition of full-time staff members.

== Original programing ==
WEOS has produced or has originated many programs of its own or from area producers. These have includes:

- The Fisher Center Lectures Series
- President's Forum
- The President's Radio Show
- Hobart Statesmen & William Smith Herons Athletics sportscasts
- Cornell Lecture Series
- The Izzy Awards from the Park Center for Independent Media at Ithaca College
- Gospel Outreach with Patti Blue
- Jazz and More with Jake Longwell
- The Metallic Onslaught with Joe Wyatt (now on WHWS)
- Live From Geneva - live concert broadcasts from the Smith Opera House

=== Original programming distributed nationally ===
WEOS also produces programs that are, or have been, distributed to other stations across the country. These include:

- Out of Bounds Radio Show with Tish Pearlman
- Stuck in the Psychedelic Era with The Hermit
- National Women's Hall of Fame Induction
- Elizabeth Blackwell Awards
- Live Political Debates
- GrassRoots Festival broadcasts
- Other specials

=== Former programs ===
Since many of WEOS's locally produced shows are done by unpaid volunteers, or by HWS students, they do not always last. Here is a partial list of their shows that, for whatever reason, are not produced anymore, or are not produced at WEOS anymore.

- The Grapevine
- Sound Salvation
- The Nobody Show (grew into the Homelessness Marathon)
- Homelessness Marathon (still produced, but independent of WEOS)
- In the Zone
- To The Point
- JG & The Chill Hour
- The Uncle Ziggy Show
- Justifying The Means
- Plato's Cave
- Outward Bound
- Unwelcome Guests
- WEOS Radio Theatre

== Hosting national broadcasts ==
WEOS has something of a reputation for hosting local broadcasts of national hosts or programs. These include:

- Nov.2008 - Amy Goodman host of Democracy Now, at the Smith Opera House in Geneva.
- Oct.2009 - NPR's Talk of the Nation Science Friday, with Ira Flatow, at Cornell University in Bailey Hall, Ithaca.
- Nov.2009 - NPR's World Cafe with David Dye, at the State Theater in Ithaca. Featuring musical guest Lyle Lovett and his Large Band.
- Apr.2010 - David Sedaris, author and frequent contributor to PRI's This American Life, at the State Theater in Ithaca.
- Jun.2010 - Says You with host Richard Sher, at the Smith Opera House in Geneva.
- Jun.2010 - PRI's Whad'ya Know with Michael Feldman, at the State Theater in Ithaca.

== Podcasts ==
WEOS also podcasts their original programs. They offer a version of pubcatcher to manage their podcasts called the WEOS Jukebox.

== See also ==
- College radio
- List of college radio stations in the United States
- WHWS-LP - Spanish-language and college music station operated by the colleges
