= WXXI-TV =

Television station in Rochester, New York

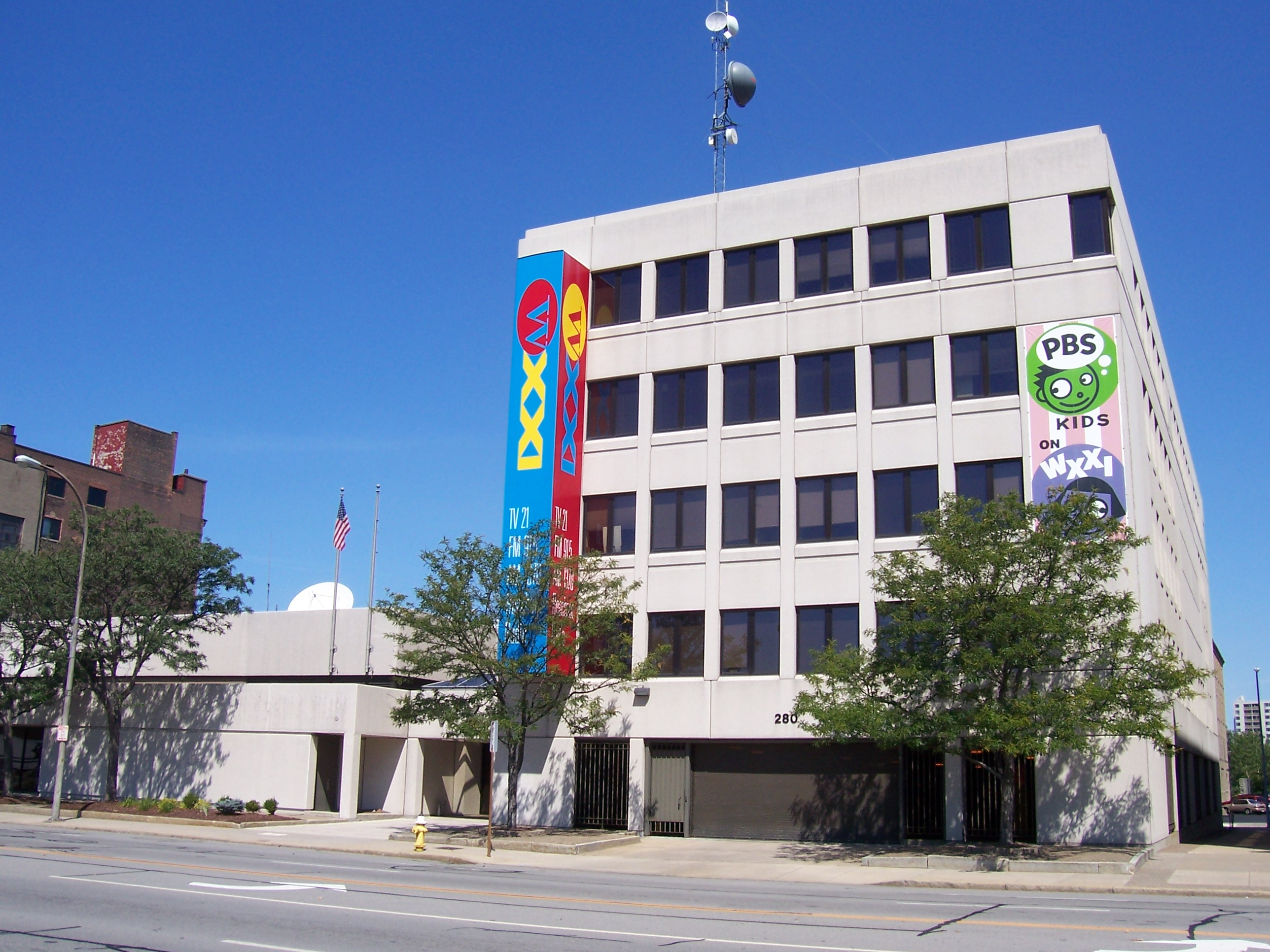
- Headquarters on State Street in Rochester
- Rochester, New York; United States
- Channels: Digital: 22 (UHF); Virtual: 21
- Branding: WXXI

Programming
- Affiliations: 21.1: PBS; for others, see § Subchannels

Ownership
- Owner: WXXI Public Broadcasting Council
- Sister stations: WXXI (AM); WXXI-FM; WXXO

History
- Founded: 1966
- First air date: September 6, 1966
- Former call signs: WROH (CP, 1952–1966); WXXI (1966–1984)
- Former channel numbers: Analog: 21 (UHF, 1966–2009); Digital: 16 (UHF, 2003–2019)
- Former affiliations: NET (1966–1970)
- Call sign meaning: "XXI" is the Roman numeral for 21

Technical information
- Licensing authority: FCC
- Facility ID: 57274
- ERP: 273 kW
- HAAT: 152 m (499 ft)
- Transmitter coordinates: 43°8′7″N 77°35′2″W

Links
- Public license information: Public file; LMS
- Website: www.wxxi.org

WXXI-TV (channel 21) is a PBS member television station in Rochester, New York, United States. It is owned by the WXXI Public Broadcasting Council alongside the public radio stations WXXI (1370 AM), WXXI-FM (105.9), and WXXO (91.5 FM). The four stations share studios at the WXXI Public Broadcasting Center on State Street near downtown Rochester; WXXI-TV's transmitter is located on Pinnacle Hill, southeast of downtown Rochester. WXXI-TV's programming includes local and national PBS content, locally produced documentaries, public affairs programs, and multicast subchannels including PBS Kids, Create, and World Channel. In addition to television and radio stations, the WXXI Public Broadcasting Council also owns The Little Theatre, an art house cinema, and City magazine.

The Rochester Area Educational Television Association (RAETA) was formed in 1958 to produce educational television programming for broadcast to schools over commercial TV stations in Rochester. At a time when not all televisions could tune ultra high frequency (UHF) channels like channel 21, the group shunned utilizing the channel 21 permit held by the New York State Department of Education and entered into a multi-year, 11-way battle for VHF channel 13, then newly assigned to the city and sought by multiple commercial applicants. Though a proposal to share time with a proposed commercial station affiliated with ABC was initially selected by a Federal Communications Commission hearing examiner, the commission overturned her ruling in 1965 after statements by ABC cast doubt on the viability of a share-time station providing the third commercial network service in Rochester. By that time, advances in UHF technology made channel 21 more feasible for educational television use, and RAETA abandoned channel 13 and built channel 21 instead.

WXXI-TV began broadcasting on September 6, 1966, from studios in Rochester's old East High School. In the years that followed, educational television shifted toward being public television, and channel 21 grew its support base and capabilities. In 1974, construction was completed on the Public Broadcasting Center, and WXXI expanded into radio broadcasting. Some of its programming was nationally distributed: the children's current events series Assignment: The World ran for more than 50 years, predating the sign-on of channel 21, while the 1988 documentary Safe Haven earned a Peabody Award and the health series Second Opinion aired nationally. WXXI-TV was Rochester's first high-power digital television station and the first to broadcast multiple subchannels. After the 2025 rescission of funding from the Corporation for Public Broadcasting, primary funding sources include memberships, contributions, and funds from the New York state government. The station produces local programming for the Rochester area.

== Educational television in Rochester: Prehistory and channel 13 proposal ==
The construction permit for channel 21 at Rochester was awarded by the Federal Communications Commission (FCC) to the New York State Department of Education on July 23, 1952, with the call sign WROH. It was one of the first four non-commercial educational TV station permits ever granted. WROH was projected as one of up to ten transmitters in the New York state educational television network. However, the state legislature never funded the network.

The Rochester Area Educational Television Association (RAETA) was incorporated in 1958 to bring educational television to the Rochester area. This group initially expressed interest in activating channel 21. However, at that time, most sets could not tune UHF stations, making the band less desirable. In the meantime, Rochester's commercial stations—WROC-TV (channel 5) and WHEC-TV and WVET-TV (channel 10)—set aside time in their broadcast days for educational programming. RAETA's first program was a series for prospective college students and their families, which debuted on WROC-TV on December 13, 1958. On January 7, 1959, WHEC-TV aired the debut of The Genesee Country, a course for 4th-grade students, which was received by 100 schools in an 11-county area. In December 1959, RAETA appointed its first paid executive director. That October, RAETA debuted Assignment: The World, a current events series, seen over WROC-TV. It moved into the former East High School on Alexander Street, which initially only housed office and rehearsal space before a studio was opened in the former gymnasium in 1963. Whereas RAETA previously had to slot into tight time windows at commercial stations' studios to produce its programs, now it had more time to devote to recording.

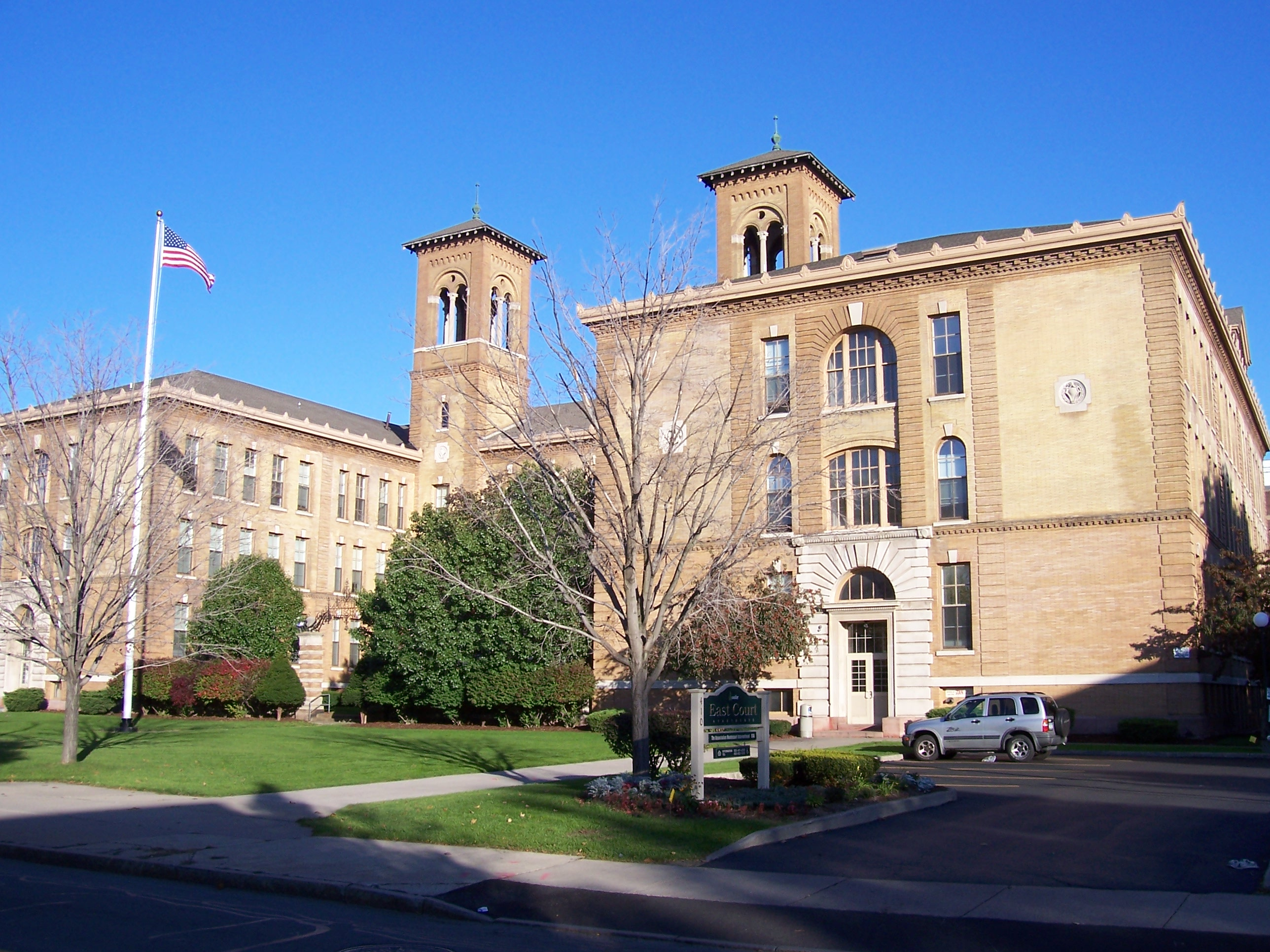
The former building of East High School housed RAETA and WXXI from 1959 to 1974.

=== Channel 13 application ===
As the FCC debated whether to assign channel 13, WVET-TV (the Veterans Broadcasting Company) and RAETA jointly filed for the channel in February 1960. The intention was to provide a VHF channel for educational use and to get WVET-TV out of its share-time status with WHEC-TV on channel 10 and into a share-time with RAETA. The need for the latter was obviated two years later when WVET-TV bought WROC-TV and sold its remaining interest in channel 10 to WHEC-TV, giving Rochester two full-time commercial stations on separate channels.

On July 8, 1961, the FCC allocated channel 13 to Rochester and moved channel 5 to channel 8. In expressing its desire for a third station to go into service as soon as possible, it permitted the applicants to file for interim operating authority to run the channel while proceedings for its final use progressed. This was seen as a disappointment for RAETA, which was struggling to raise funds. Its board called the FCC decision "arbitrary" but announced its plans to file for interim authority anyway. It proposed to be on the air with educational programming 52 hours a week. A host of commercial applicants also filed, and the Rochester board of education called on them to drop out. In November, RAETA modified its application to seek a share-time with a new applicant, Rochester Telecasters, which proposed to broadcast commercially with ABC affiliation for 81 hours a week while RAETA operated 44 hours weekly. RAETA and Rochester Telecasters were two of the eleven applications awaiting disposition by the commission. Meanwhile, eight applicants—not including RAETA—received interim authority to start broadcasting from channel 13, which began as WOKR on September 15, 1962.

On January 28, 1964, FCC examiner Annie Neal Huntting rendered an initial decision in favor of the share-time bid by RAETA and Rochester Telecasters. She found their combined service superior to any of the other commercial applicants, noting, "The strong preference due the RAETA–RTI combination for the best proposal to fill the most significant unfulfilled programming need in the area proposed to be served outweighs such preferences as have been earned by any of the remaining commercial applicants." The losing applicants and ABC, which believed affiliating with a share-time channel 13 unviable for its purposes and a "last resort", appealed Huntting's decision, leading to oral argument in front of the FCC.

During this time, channel 21 periodically came up in discussions. RAETA and its supporters believed at the time that UHF was not suited for their purpose. Harold S. Hacker, the president of RAETA, wrote an editorial in May 1961 that decried attempts to give educational television "second-class UHF status" on a band that required conversion. The channel remained in the state's plans, though legislators cut money to build it from the 1963 budget.

The FCC remanded the Rochester channel 13 case to an examiner on May 13, 1965. In its decision, it asked for findings on whether a share-time commercial station would provide viable third-network service and whether "alternative means" were available to broadcast educational programming in Rochester, including channel 21. By this time, new TV sets were required to include UHF tuning, and transmission equipment had improved to increase the area that a UHF station could cover. In light of the decision, RAETA began exploring its options for channel 21. Several of the commercial applicants offered to reimburse RAETA for its legal costs if the group dropped out of the channel 13 contest. On September 24, RAETA took the offer and dropped out of the channel 13 contest, ensuring that educational television in Rochester would arrive on a UHF channel.

== History ==
=== Early years ===
On December 8, 1965, the New York State Department of Education filed to transfer the construction permit for WROH to RAETA and establish new technical parameters for channel 21. At the same time, RAETA began raising funds to secure matching grants from the state. In January 1966, RAETA was permitted to withdraw its channel 13 application, a necessary step for the grant of the permit assignment, which came the next month. The WROH call sign was changed to WXXI, representing the Roman numeral for 21 and seen by RAETA as a more distinctive designation compared to other local stations.

WXXI signed on September 6, 1966, as Rochester's first non-commercial educational television station. Non-local programming came from National Educational Television—replaced with PBS in October 1970—and the Eastern Educational Network. The next year, New York state inaugurated a statewide educational TV interconnection, the New York Network, with WXXI as one of the first five stations. Channel 21 grew in the years that followed, as educational television transitioned into public television with increasing federal and community support as well as adult viewership. In 1969, the station acquired two used production trucks for outside broadcasting use, and by 1976 it was presenting some 30 remote broadcasts annually. Also in 1969, the station began raising funds with an annual on-air auction. Local programming ranged from newscasts in Spanish and for the deaf to live broadcasts of women's high school sports and hockey games.

=== Opening of the Public Broadcasting Center and expansion ===
The East High School space became unsuitable for continued use by channel 21 as it grew. On one occasion, general manager William Pearce recalled a camera wobbling as it moved over uneven floors in the studio, causing the picture to shake. Staff joked at the time that the cameras rolled on their own on the floors. In 1972, Eastman Kodak donated $400,000 in cash as well as a $100,000 land parcel that had previously been a parking lot for the construction of a new studio facility. Two years later, the station moved into the Public Broadcasting Center at 280 State Street. Its opening coincided with the launch of Rochester's first public radio station, WXXI-FM 91.5. The new facilities made possible the debut of a nightly news program, Newsroom, the first Rochester newscast to use electronic news gathering. It lasted for more than two years before being converted into a current affairs program in 1977.

In the 1980s and 1990s, WXXI expanded into a multichannel public broadcaster. A second radio station was added in 1984 with the purchase of commercial station WRTK (1370 AM) to become WXXI AM and the 1988 takeover of Reachout Radio, the area's radio reading service. The Public Broadcasting Center was expanded in 1992 with a 45,000-square-foot (4,200 m^{2}) addition including a third television studio and more office space. During this time, WXXI-TV won Rochester television's first Peabody Award for Safe Haven, a 1987 documentary about the Fort Ontario Emergency Refugee Shelter in Oswego, New York.

The 1990s saw budget cuts, real and threatened, as well as the first leadership transition in a quarter-century. From 1990 to 1994, WXXI saw less money come in from New York state and Monroe County, but the station cut payroll, increased its use of outside grant monies to fund programs and saw steady increases in membership. In 1993, WXXI began operating City 12, the government access channel for Rochester on cable television systems, under an arrangement with the city. William Pearce retired in 1995 after a 26-year run as president and was replaced by Norm Silverstein, previously of Maryland Public Television. In 1998, WXXI co-produced the documentary Echoes of the Ancients with the University of Rochester, on the ancient Israeli town of Yodfat. It was the first nationally distributed documentary by WXXI since Safe Haven and aired on some 300 PBS stations.

In 2002, WXXI produced a pilot health talk show, Second Opinion. Second Opinion became a nationally distributed program in 2004 and ran for 18 seasons, the last two hosted by former Good Morning America anchor Joan Lunden.

=== Digital era ===
In September 2003, WXXI-TV began broadcasting the first full-power digital television signal in Rochester; though three commercial stations were broadcasting in digital, they were doing so at low power. WXXI was also the first local station to offer digital subchannels. To support the project, the station launched the 21/21 Vision capital campaign. The campaign met its goal thanks to a $2 million donation from Tom Golisano, founder of Rochester-based Paychex Inc. and owner of the Buffalo Sabres hockey team, which was the largest gift in station history to that time. The digital signal was also used to provide data distribution to fire, police and medical facilities in the Rochester area.

Assignment: The World, which had grown over the years from a local production to regional and later national distribution through the Agency for Instructional Technology, remained in production continuously until May 2013, when it was discontinued after a 53-year run due to rising costs of acquiring news material. Another nationally distributed children's program from this period was Biz Kids, a joint production with Junior Achievement featuring youth entrepreneurs. The production team was based in Seattle, and the show was presented mostly by West Coast actors.

=== Loss of federal funding and reorganization ===
Norm Silverstein announced his retirement in 2023 and was replaced the next year as general manager of the WXXI stations by Chris Hastings, former chief editor of the World Channel.

In 2025, the elimination of federal funding through the Corporation for Public Broadcasting threatened to reduce WXXI's operating budget by approximately $1.9 million annually, with PBS Kids educational programming identified as one of the most at-risk areas. Audience support increased, and WXXI was able to limit layoffs to two positions. The cuts also led to an internal reorganization of WXXI.

== Technical information and subchannels ==
WXXI-TV's transmitter is located on Pinnacle Hill, southeast of downtown Rochester. The station's signal is multiplexed:

Subchannels of WXXI-TV
Subchannel	Res.	Short name	Programming
21.1	1080i	WXXI-HD	PBS
21.2	480i	WXXI-W	World
21.3	480i	WXXI-C	Create
21.4	480i	WXXI-K	PBS Kids
22.7	Audio only	WXXO-FM	WXXI Classical (SAP: Readout Radio)
31.4	480i	ROAR	Roar (WUHF)

Broadcast on behalf of another station

WXXI-TV shut down its analog signal on UHF channel 21 on June 12, 2009, as part of the nationwide digital television transition. The station's digital signal moved to UHF channel 16, using virtual channel 21. WXXI relocated its signal from channel 16 to channel 22 in 2019 as a result of the 2016 United States wireless spectrum auction.
