= Sound Bytes =

Sound Bytes is the title of a weekly program that airs on WGMC, a Rochester, New York radio station. It can be heard Saturdays starting at noon Eastern Time, and lasts approximately two hours. The name is a play on words of the words sound bite and byte.

The focus of the show is computers, computer users, and the computing industry, and also sometimes covers technology in general and its social and political implications. It is hosted by Nick Francesco, Dave Enright, and Steve Rea. The format of the show also allows computer users to call in to try to get assistance with their computer problems. Unlike many strictly local radio station programs, the Sound Bytes crew allows those who are listening to the show via the Internet to get on the air as well.

"Uncle Dave's Story Hour" is a regular feature of the show which is a rant about something that happened that raised the ire of Dave Enright in his shop.

Each of the hosts is a specialist in the computing field. Nick is a retired Systems Administrator for the E. Philip Saunders College of Business at the Rochester Institute of Technology. Dave ran a computer sales and repair shop which concentrates on Intel architecture PCs. Steve works for a computer sales and repair company that concentrates on Apple products.

The hosts of the show have come up with a methodology of ridding a computer running Microsoft operating systems of malware called The Security Tango. It consists of deleting files from the computer and running tools that flag and remove malware. It also makes recommendations of what programs (firewalls, antivirus, etc.) users should be running regularly on their computers to keep them relatively secure. Most of the tools and programs in The Security Tango are freeware. Eventually, "The Tango" was expanded to include procedures for Apple (the Macarena and the iPhone Pavane), the Linux Lambada, and the Android Allemande. The procedure for Microsoft Windows was renamed the Windows Waltz. Therefore, the Security Tango has come to mean the suite of procedures, with the individual dances for different platforms.

Having been on the air in some form since September 2, 1989, Sound Bytes is the longest running show about computers. The program originally aired on WXXI in Rochester (the region's principal NPR affiliate) and was created by then-WXXI radio vice president Mark Boardman and original host Bob Smith. Francesco, Enright and Rea joined as regular panelists early in the program's run, later opting to take the program to commercial competitor WHAM-AM (which carried it in various time slots on weekends from December 2001 until cancelling it at the end of the decade). It then moved to its current home on WGMC.
