= City Newspaper =

Alternative weekly newspaper of Rochester, New York

CITY Newspaper
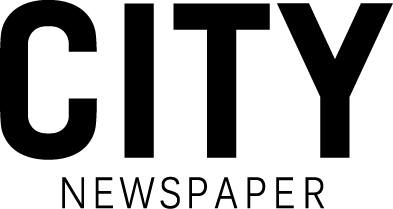
- Type: Alternative weekly
- Owner: WXXI Public Broadcasting Council
- Founder(s): Mary Anna and Bill Towler
- Publisher: Rochester Area Media Partners LLC
- Editor: Leah Stacy
- Staff writers: 9
- Founded: 1971
- Language: English
- Headquarters: Rochester, New York
- Website: www.roccitymag.com
- Free online archives: Yes

City Newspaper is the alternative weekly newspaper of Rochester, New York. It was first published October 5, 1971 and is free in over 600 locations across Rochester and the Finger Lakes region. Owned by founders Mary Anna and Bill Towler from 1971 until 2019, the paper was sold to the WXXI Public Broadcasting Council in May 2019, when the founders decided to go into retirement. CITY Newspaper is part of WXXI's for-profit arm. CITY is a member of the Association of Alternative Newsweeklies.
