= Live 93 =

Live album by the Orb
- Released: 22 November 1993
- Genre: Ambient house
- Length: 140:57
- Label: Island
- Producers: Alex Paterson, Kris Weston

The Orb chronology
U.F.Orb (1992)	Live 93 (1993)	Pomme Fritz (1994)

Professional ratings
Review scores
Source	Rating
AllMusic	4/5 stars

Live 93 is a live album by English electronic music group the Orb, released in November 1993 through Island Records. Live 93 is a collection of highlights from the Orb's 1993 performances in Europe and Asia. It features the Orb's live performance crew of Alex Paterson, Kris Weston, producers Nick Burton and Simon Phillips, as well as audio engineer Andy Hughes, who had stepped in when Weston decided to stop touring. The album cover of a sheep over a power station is a parody of the cover of Pink Floyd's Animals, an album cover they had previously parodied on the cover of Aubrey Mixes: The Ultraworld Excursions. The album reached No. 23 on the UK Album Chart.

== Track listing ==
Island – 5300703:

CD 1
No.	Title	Live recording	Length
1.	"Plateau"	Tokyo, July 2, 1993	11:52
2.	"O. O. B. E."	Copenhagen, August 29, 1993	11:58
3.	"Little Fluffy Clouds"	Tokyo, July 2, 1993	10:55
4.	"Star 6 & 7 8 9"	Glastonbury Festival, June 26, 1993	9:59
5.	"Towers of Dub"	Live Orbient, September 3, 1993	12:33
6.	"Blue Room"	Copenhagen, August 28, 1993	14:58

CD 2
No.	Title	Live recording	Length
1.	"Valley"	Glastonbury Festival, June 26, 1993	10:07
2.	"Perpetual Dawn"	Copenhagen, August 29, 1993	9:00
3.	"Assassin"	Live Orbient, September 6, 1993	11:48
4.	"Outlands"	Glastonbury Festival, June 26, 1993	9:06
5.	"Spanish Castles in Space"	Glastonbury Festival, June 26, 1993	10:40
6.	"A Huge Ever Growing Pulsating Brain That Rules from the Centre of the Ultraworld (Loving U)"	Copenhagen, August 28, 1993	18:52
Total length:			2:20:48

"Valley (Glastonbury 26.6.93)" (1993)
Clip from "Valley (Glastonbury 26.6.93)".
