= Auntie Aubrey's Excursions Beyond the Call of Duty Part 2 =

2001 compilation album by The Orb

Remix album by the Orb
- Released: 2001
- Genre: Ambient; chill-out
- Length: 2:33:00
- Label: Deviant; Ultra

The Orb remix album chronology
Auntie Aubrey's Excursions Beyond the Call of Duty (1996)	Auntie Aubrey's Excursions Beyond the Call of Duty Part 2 (2001)	Auntie Aubrey's Excursions Beyond the Call of Duty Part 3 (2020)

Professional ratings
Review scores
Source	Rating
AllMusic	4/5 stars
Pitchfork Media	(6.9/10)
Progressive-Sounds	4/5 stars

Auntie Aubrey's Excursions Beyond the Call of Duty Part 2 is a remix compilation album by English electronic music group the Orb released in 2001. The U.S. and UK editions featured different track listings. All tracks are remixes by the Orb.

== UK track listing ==
=== Disc 1 ===
1. The KLF - "3 a.m. Eternal" (Blue Danube Orbital Mix) (7:40)
2. Primal Scream - "Higher Than the Sun" (Battersea Shield Mix) (6:20)
3. Wendy & Lisa - "Staring at the Sun" (Blinding Mix) (8:34)
4. The Orb & Robbie Williams - "I Started a Joke" (I Started an Orb Mix) (4:27)
5. The Orb - "Once More" (FT Explore Satan Mix) (4:46)
6. Lisa Stansfield - "Time to Make You Mine" (In My Dreams Mix) (9:58)
7. Rick Wright - "Runaway" (Leggit Dub) (13:38)
8. Art of Noise - "Art of Love" (Youth & Orb Mix) (4:26)
9. Tubeway Army - "Jo the Waiter" (Bon Apètit Mix) (9:32)
10. Penguin Cafe Orchestra - "Music for a Found Harmonium" (Pandaharmoniumorb Mix) (4:56)

=== Disc 2 ===
1. Mike Oldfield & The Orb - "Sentinel" (Nobel Prize Mix) (14:24)
2. System 7 - "Miracle" (Orb Remix) (6:10)
3. Can - "Halleluwa" (Halleluwa Orbus II) (9:09)
4. The Grid - "Crystal Clear" (Crystal Clear Water Revival Mix) (7:17)
5. Meat Beat Manifesto - "Radio Babylon" (Beach Blanket Bimboland Mix) (12:38)
6. Tangerine Dream - "Towards the Evening Star" (Mandarin Cream Mix) (8:23)
7. Witchman - "Angel Art" (The Tale of The Orb Remix) (6:17)
8. The Damage Manual - "Sunset Gun" (Full Monty Sunny Orb Up Mix) (5:05)
9. Yasuaki Shimizu - "Morocco Mole" (6:46)
10. Mindless Drug Hoover - "The Reefer Song" (Grass Garden of Child's Mix) (3:04)

== U.S. track listing ==
=== Disc 1 ===
1. Pato Banton - "Beams of Light" (Depths Of An Ocean Lovemix) (7:53)
2. System 7 - "Miracle" (Orb Remix) (6:34)
3. Can - "Halleluwah" (Halleluwah Orbus II) (8:39)
4. The Grid - "Crystal Clear" (Crystal Clear Water Revival Mix) (7:23)
5. Meat Beat Manifesto - "Radio Babylon" (Beach Blanket Bimboland Mix) (12:36)
6. Tangerine Dream - "Towards the Evening Star" (Mandarin Cream Mix) (8:24)
7. Witchman - "Angel Art" (The Tale of The Orb Remix) (6:17)
8. The Damage Manual - "Sunset Gun" (Full Monty Sunny Orb Up Mix) (5:01)
9. Yasuaki Shimizu - "Morocco Mole" (6:50)
10. Mindless Drug Hoover - "The Reefer Song" (Grass Garden of Child's Mix) (3:05)

=== Disc 2 ===
1. Lisa Stansfield - "Time to Make You Mine" (In My Dreams Mix) (9:22)
2. West India Company - "O Je Suis Seul" (Orient Express Mix) (7:28)
3. Fischerman's Friend - "Money" (Orb Club Mix) (6:24)
4. Delkom - "Superjack" (Orbital Infusion 2000) (5:56)
5. Sun Electric - "Red Summer" (Orb Koskiewicz Mix) (7:21)
6. System 7 - "Sunburst" (Orb Remix) (8:50)
7. Richard Wright - "Runaway" (R. Wright's Leggit Mix) (13:42)
8. Tubeway Army - "Jo the Waiter" (Bon Apetit Mix) (9:50)
9. Penguin Cafe Orchestra - "Music for a Found Harmonium" (Pandaharmoniumorb Mix) (4:53)
