= State Theater (Ithaca, New York) =

- State Theatre of Ithaca, Inc.
- U.S. National Register of Historic Places
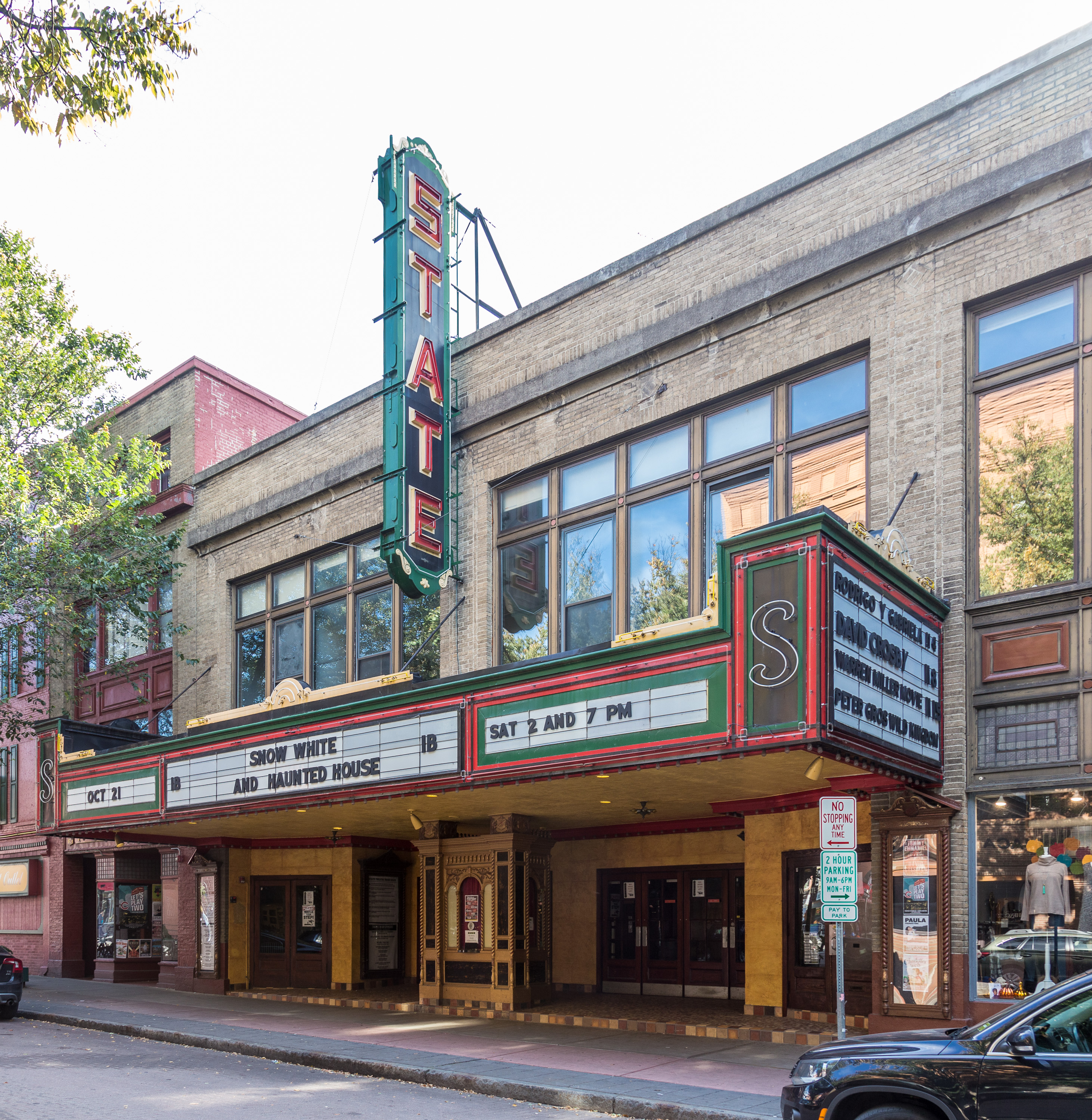

- Location within New York Location within the United States
- Location: 105-109 W. State St., Ithaca, New York
- Coordinates: 42°26′21″N 76°29′59″W
- Area: 0 acres (0 ha)
- Built: 1928
- Architect: Rigaumont, Victor A.; Hinckley, Henry N.
- Architectural style: Collegiate Gothic
- NRHP reference No.: 96000613
- Added to NRHP: June 14, 1996

State Theatre of Ithaca is a historic, 1600-seat theatre located at Ithaca in Tompkins County, New York that hosts various events from bands, to plays, to comedy acts, to silent films, and more.

It was listed on the National Register of Historic Places in 1996.

== History of the State Theatre ==
The State Theatre building dates back to 1915. Designed by local architect Henry N. Hinckley, it was originally the Ithaca Security Company auto garage and dealership. The Berinstein family purchased the building in 1928. They hired architect Victor Rigaumont to design and oversee the transformation of the garage and showroom into a cinema and vaudeville palace. Rigaumont incorporated elements of the Moorish and Renaissance Revival Styles and the Collegiate Gothic symbolism of Cornell University. Opening night was on December 6, 1928.

Beginning with vaudeville, the theater has evolved with the times. When movies became more popular in the early 1930s, the theater thrived primarily as a cinema house. After World War II, with the advent of television and suburban movies houses, downtown cinema palaces like the State struggled. To adapt, the owners added a second movie screen in the 1970s, dividing the balcony from the main house.

Ultimately, the theater closed in the 1980s because of financial difficulties and the demands of long-deferred maintenance. It spent some time owned by the Ithaca Performing Arts Center, but in 1997, the theater was condemned by the City of Ithaca because of serious roof damage, a failing heating and ventilation system, and the safety hazards caused by falling plaster and out-of-date electrical systems. Community anxiety about the State Theatre was intense. Downtown Ithaca once boasted seven grand theaters, including the Lyceum, the Crescent, and the Strand. The State Theatre is the last remaining cinema and vaudeville palace in Ithaca.

In May 1998, with community support, the organization purchased the failing structure and assumed the role of preservationist, developer and manager, establishing the State Theatre Restoration Project. Historic Ithaca staff and volunteers accepted the daunting task of reversing the building's condemnation. This included replacement or serious repair of the main roof, the dangerously disintegrated plaster walls, the outdated electrical systems, the fire detection system, and the heating and ventilation systems.

Strong community support bolstered this first phase of the project and secured funding from municipal, foundation and private donors; leaders from the business, arts, preservation and political communities were involved. In 1999, the American Institute of Architects recognized the State Theatre as one of the most significant architectural landmarks in New York State, and a few years later it was added to the National Register of Historic Places.

Between 1998 and December 2001, Phase I of the State Theatre Restoration Project was completed. After years of community effort the State Theatre regained its occupancy permit, and the theater re-opened on December 5, 2001.

In the spring of 2009, The State Theatre of Ithaca, Inc., a newly formed 501(c)(3) not-for-profit organization, purchased the State Theatre from Historic Ithaca.

== The State Theatre today ==
The State Theatre consists of a primary staff of Executive Director Doug Levine, Director of Marketing Casey Martin, Event Manager Sarah Flenders, Production Manager Adam Zonder, Development Coordinator Rachel Grant, Box Office Manager Connor Lange and Back of House Supervisor David Santos. A twelve-member board of directors oversees the State Theatre of Ithaca. Volunteers assist as ushers, ticket takers, concessions workers, office helpers, and stagehands.
