= Time Unlimited =

Record label

- Founded: 1992
- Founder: Joachim Keil, Marc Steinmeier^{(current owner)}
- Distributor: Daredo labelgroup
- Genre: Trance, tech trance, progressive house, ambient
- Country of origin: Germany
- Location: Hannover
- Official website: www.timeunlimited.de

Time Unlimited is a record label that specializes in the production of trance music based out of Hannover, Germany.

The label was founded and established by Joachim Keil in September 1992. Time Unlimited was the first of the Under Cover Music Group UCMG Germany family of labels. The label was relaunched in 2007 by Marc Steinmeier.

The label was founded to release hi-quality electronic music specializing in hard and progressive trance. Originally distributed by MMS in Germany, later on by Intergroove across Europe.

Home label for a variety of successful trance producers, most notably Bernd Augustinski (Nostrum), but also releasing multiple releases from Andreas Kettenbach (Roughage), Marc Steinmeier (Overcharge & Nuclear Hyde), Michael Kores (Albion), and Roger Beglinger (DJ Energy). The task to define the sound of Time Unlimited today borders on sheer impossibility. Time moves in the realm of electronic Music (trance, progressive house and ambient). Since 2004 is Time Unlimited a part of Daredo labelgroup.

In August 2008, Time Unlimited and the German sample & sound design company Ueberschall launched the "Trance ID 2" remix contest. The winner was guaranteed a release on the Time Unlimited label. The international producers that provided the construction kits on the "Trance ID 2" sample pack included Time Unlimited's Mike Koglin, Marc Steinmeier, Darren Tate, and Mark Pledger.

== Artists ==
- Roughage
- Nostrum
- The Apex
- Mike Koglin
- Deep Voices
- Nuclear Hyde
- Blix Cannon
- Marcel Van Eyck
- Thomas Radman
