= Little Theatre (Rochester, New York) =

- U.S. National Register of Historic Places
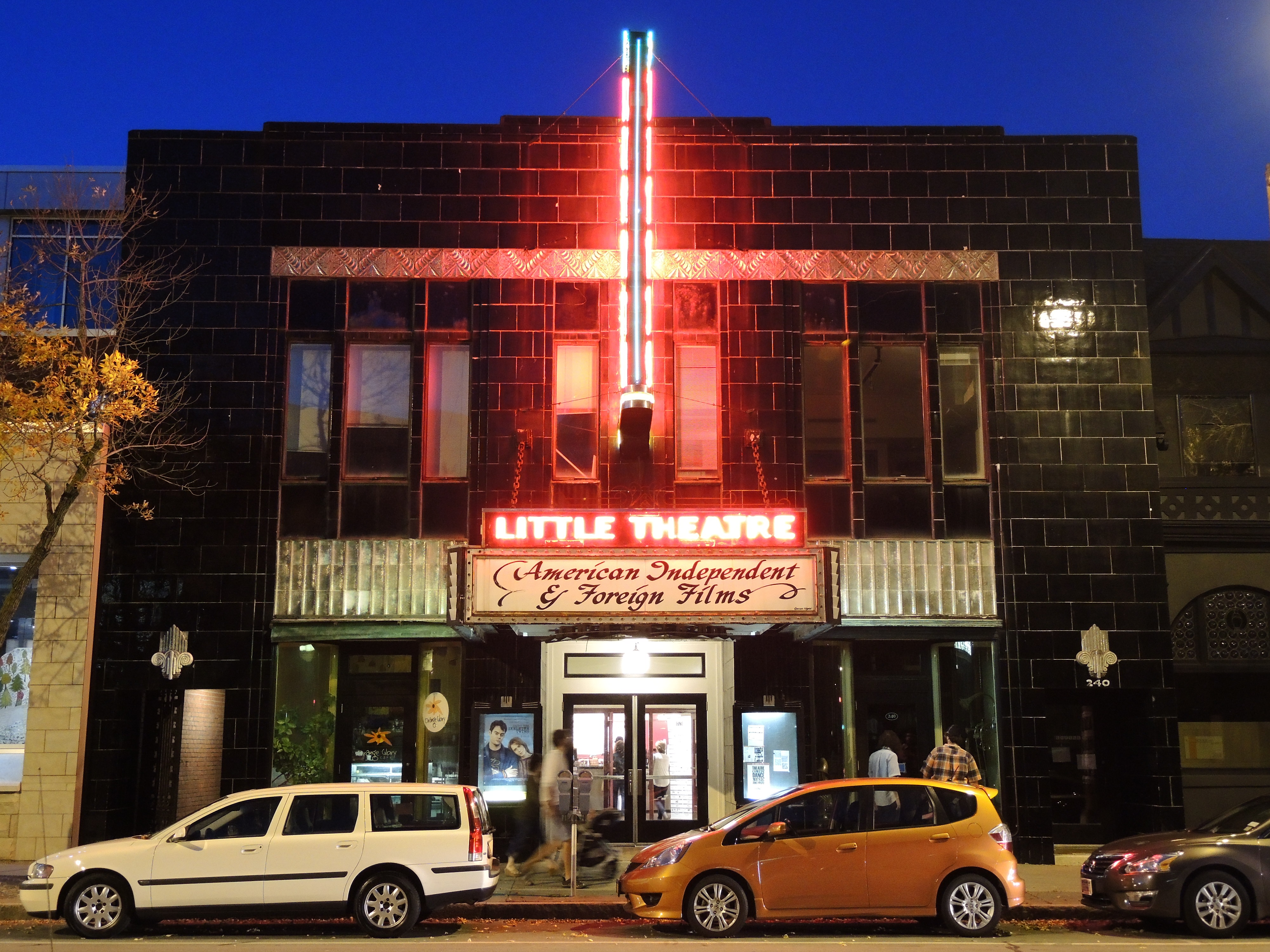
- The Little Theatre, Rochester NY
- Location: Rochester, New York
- Coordinates: 43°9′21.15″N 77°35′51.77″W
- Built: 1929
- Architect: Edgar Phillips
- Architectural style: Art Deco
- Website: thelittle.org
- MPS: Inner Loop MRA
- NRHP reference No.: 85002860
- Added to NRHP: October 4, 1985

The Little Theatre, commonly known as The Little, is a movie theatre located on East Avenue in downtown Rochester, New York, and a non-profit multiplex specializing in art film, including independent and foreign productions outside the United States.

Founded in 1929, The Little is one of the oldest theaters for art-house cinema in the United States. Since 2011, the Little Theatre has been an affiliate of the WXXI Public Broadcasting Council, a non-profit community organization which owns and operates the region's principal public radio and television stations.

The Little has served as a performance venue during the Rochester International Jazz Festival held annually in June. During the COVID-19 pandemic, the building was closed and the theater switched to an online format, streaming independent films from its website. Since 2021, the Little Theatre has been home to the High Falls Film Festival, a monthly series focused on celebrating women in film. In 2022, the theater received the Excellence in Historic Preservation award from the Preservation League of New York State for restoration work of its interior, which aimed to match the original 1929 appearance of the theater as closely as possible while improving its accessibility.

== Gallery ==
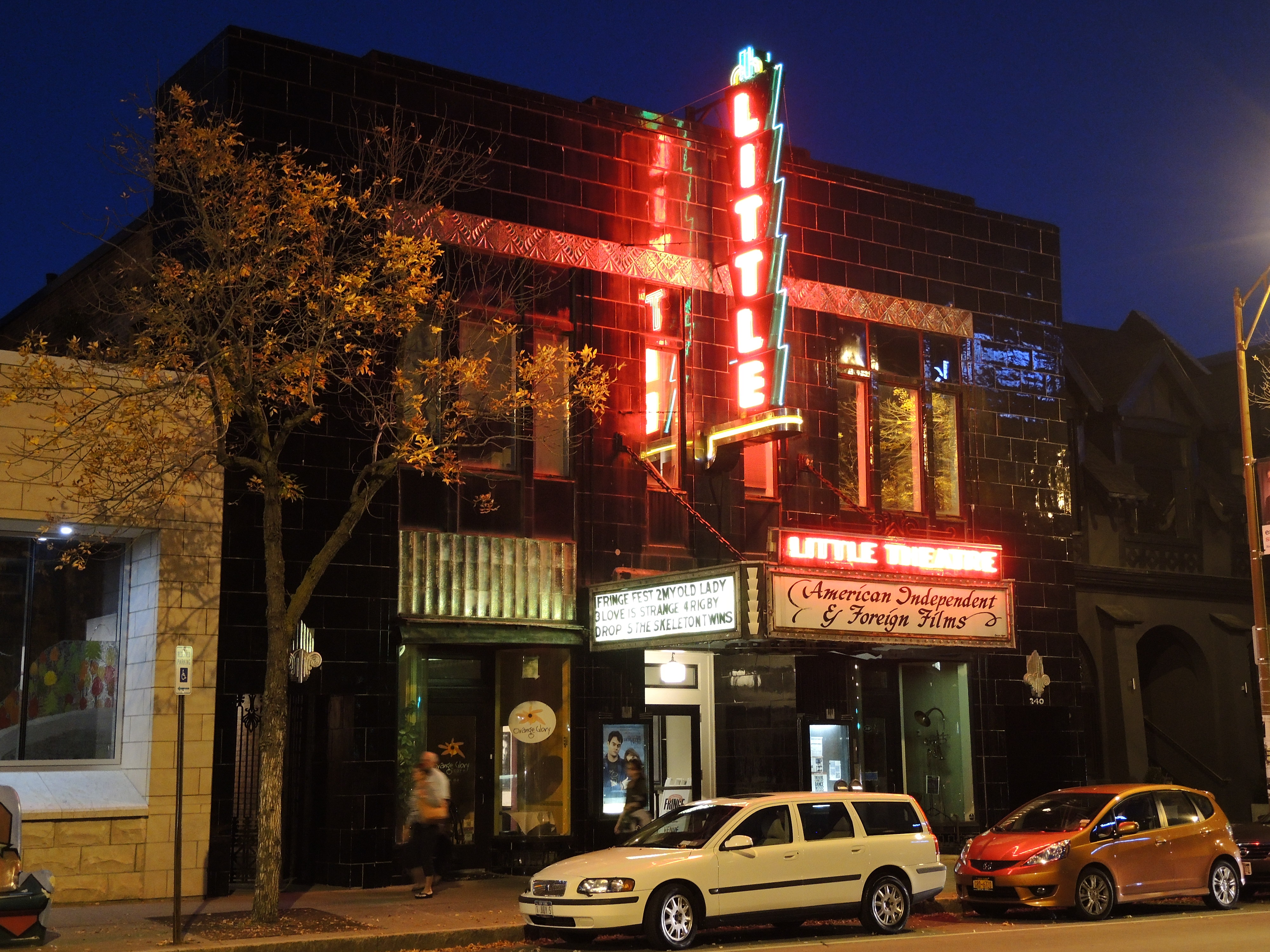
Exterior in 2014

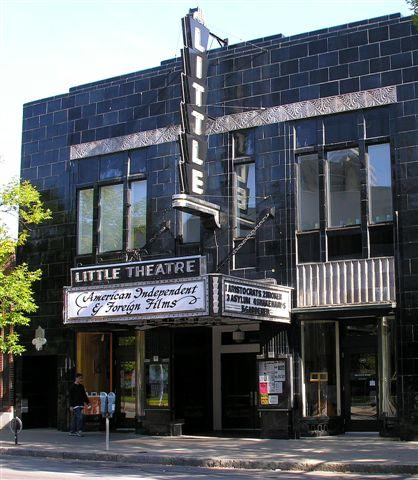
Exterior in 2005

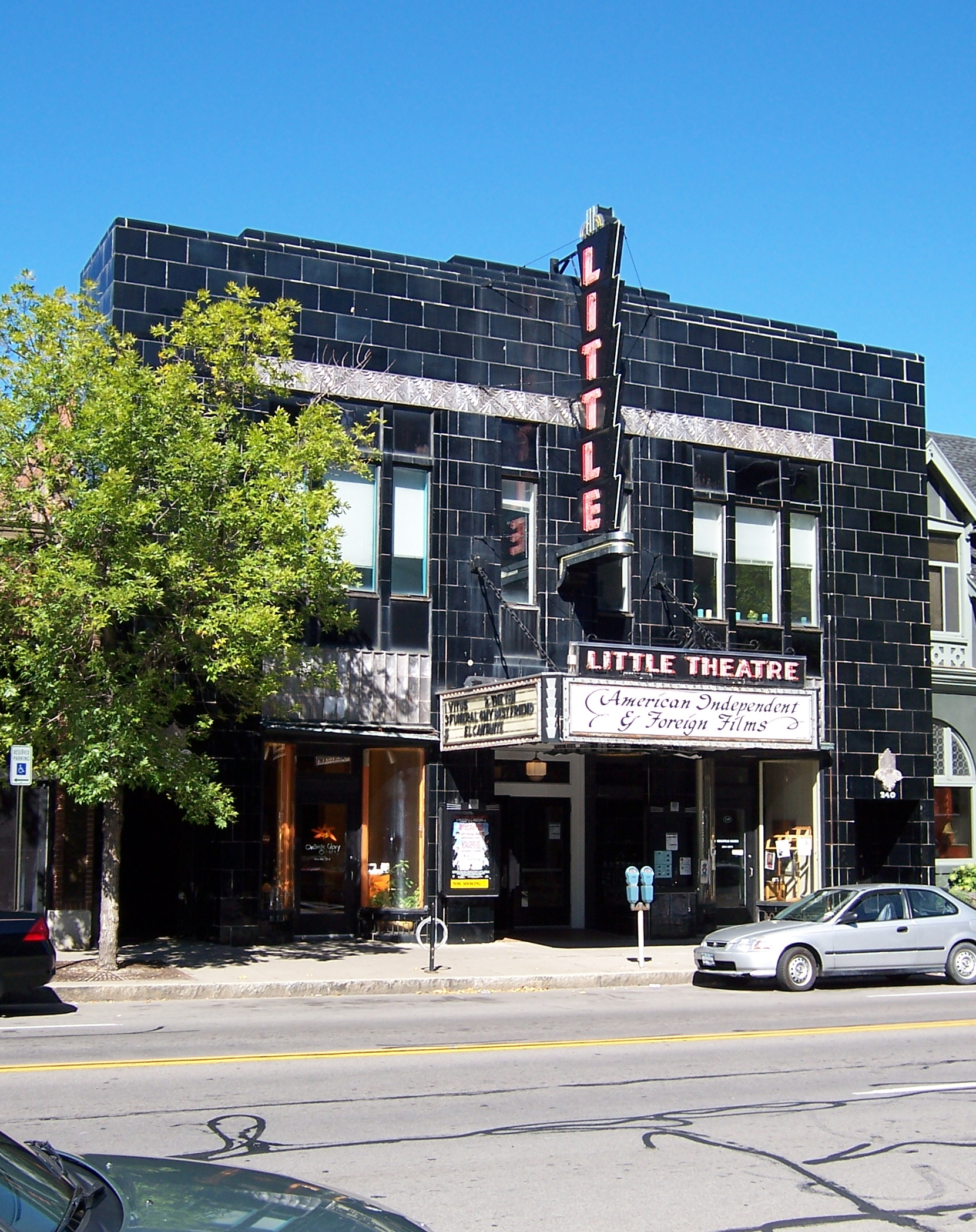
Exterior in 2007
