= National Association of Mutual Insurance Companies =

U.S. trade association

The National Association of Mutual Insurance Companies (NAMIC) is the United States trade association that represents mutual property and casualty insurance companies. Established in 1895, NAMIC operates in the U.S. and Canada, engaging in advocacy and educational initiatives. As the largest property and casualty trade association in the United States, NAMIC has nearly 1,300 regional and local mutual insurance member companies.

The association was officially incorporated in 1920 in Indianapolis, Indiana, where its national headquarters is located. Additionally, NAMIC maintains an office on Capitol Hill in Washington, D.C. Beyond its federal advocacy efforts, NAMIC operates a network of state managers who represent member companies in every state legislature across the country. The organization also provides a range of services to support its member companies, state-based trade associations, and the broader insurance industry. These services include educational programs aimed at increasing public awareness of insurance principles and the role of the property and casualty insurance industry.
