= U.F.Orb =

Studio album by the Orb
- Released: 6 July 1992
- Recorded: Metalworks studio Toronto Canada 1991
- Genres: Electronica; ambient house; dub; ambient techno
- Length: 73:55
- Label: Big Life
- Producers: The Orb; Steve Hillage; Youth

The Orb chronology
The Orb's Adventures Beyond the Ultraworld (1991)	U.F.Orb (1992)	Live 93 (1993)

Professional ratings
Review scores
Source	Rating
AllMusic	5/5 stars
The Encyclopedia of Popular Music	4/5 stars
Entertainment Weekly	A
NME	9/10
Record Collector	4/5 stars
The Rolling Stone Album Guide	4/5 stars
Select	5/5
Spin Alternative Record Guide	9/10
Uncut	4/5 stars
The Village Voice	B−

U.F.Orb is the second studio album by English electronic music group the Orb. It was released on 6 July 1992 through the record label Big Life. Upon its release, the album reached No. 1 on the UK Albums Chart. The music database AllMusic described it as "the commercial and artistic peak of the ambient-house movement."

== Background ==
Orb member Kris Weston integrated his technical and creative expertise with Alex Paterson's Eno-influenced ambience on U.F.Orb, creating "drum and bass rhythms" with "velvet keyboards" and "rippling synth lines". U.F.Orb reached number one on the UK Albums Chart to the shock of critics, who were surprised that fans had embraced what journalists considered to be progressive rock. Heavily influenced by the Orb and U.F.Orb in particular, many trip hop groups sprang up emulating the Orb's "chill-out blueprint". U.F.Orb expresses the Orb's fascination with alien life with its bizarre sound samples and in the album's title itself. The album's single, "Blue Room", is a reference to the supposed Blue Room of Wright-Patterson Air Force Base, which was investigated as a possible UFO evidence-holding room.

"Blue Room", a near 17-minute piece, features bass playing by Jah Wobble and guitar by coproducer Steve Hillage. The full version of the song is 40 minutes and was released as a single. The initial UK vinyl release featured a limited edition which came in a sealed blue heavy PVC cover and featured two art prints and a bonus 12-inch of the soundtrack to the film The Orb's Adventures Beyond the Ultraworld: Patterns and Textures.

On 1 October 2007, the album was reissued on two CDs as part of Universal Music's "Collector's Series". All the tracks were remastered, and the release coincided with the 15th anniversary of the album's release. The second CD includes remixes from the singles released around the period of the original album.

== Track listing ==
=== Original release ===
Big Life – BLRLP 18, 513 749-1 Side one
No.	Title	Writer(s)	Length
1.	"O.O.B.E"	Alex Paterson, Kris Weston, Thomas Fehlmann	12:51
2.	"U.F.Orb"	Paterson, Weston	6:08

Side two
No.	Title	Writer(s)	Length
1.	"Blue Room"	Paterson, Weston, Miquette Giraudy, Steve Hillage, John Joseph Wardle, Neil Fraser	17:34

Side three
No.	Title	Writer(s)	Length
1.	"Towers of Dub"	Paterson, Weston, Fehlmann	14:58

Side four
No.	Title	Writer(s)	Length
1.	"Close Encounters"	Paterson, Weston, Orde Meikle, Stuart McMillan	10:27
2.	"Majestic"	Paterson, Weston, Martin Glover	11:06
3.	"Sticky End"	Paterson, Weston	0:49
Total length:			1:13:55

=== 1992 US double CD edition ===
Mercury – 314 513 749-2, Big Life – 314 513 749-2 Disc 1
No.	Title	Writer(s)	Length
1.	"O.O.B.E"	Paterson, Weston, Fehlmann	12:51
2.	"U.F.Orb"	Paterson, Weston	6:08
3.	"Blue Room"	Paterson, Weston, Giraudy, Hillage, Ward, Fraser	17:34
4.	"Towers of Dub"	Paterson, Weston, Fehlmann	15:00
5.	"Close Encounters"	Paterson, Weston, Meikle, McMillan	10:27
6.	"Majestic"	Paterson, Weston, Glover	11:06
7.	"Sticky End"	Paterson, Weston	0:49

Disc 2
No.	Title	Writer(s)	Length
1.	"Blue Room" (Edit)	Paterson, Weston, Giraudy, Hillage, Ward, Fraser	3:09
2.	"Blue Room" (Remix)	Paterson, Weston, Giraudy, Hillage, Ward, Fraser	7:37
3.	"Assassin" (The Oasis of Rhythms Mix)	Paterson, Weston, Lewis Keogh	15:14
4.	"Blue Room" (Full Length)	Paterson, Weston, Giraudy, Hillage, Ward, Fraser	40:00
Total length:			2:19:55

=== 15th anniversary edition ===
Universal Music – 5300703 Disc 1 – Orbit One: U.F.Orb Remastered
No.	Title	Writer(s)	Length
1.	"O.O.B.E"	Paterson, Weston, Fehlmann	12:51
2.	"U.F.Orb"	Paterson, Weston	6:08
3.	"Blue Room"	Paterson, Weston, Giraudy, Hillage, Ward, Fraser	17:34
4.	"Towers of Dub"	Paterson, Weston, Fehlmann	15:00
5.	"Close Encounters"	Paterson, Weston, Meikle, McMillan	10:27
6.	"Majestic"	Paterson, Weston, Glover	11:06
7.	"Sticky End"	Paterson, Weston	0:49

Disc 2 – Orbit Two: Remixes
No.	Title	Writer(s)	Length
1.	"O.O.B.E" (Andy Hughes Mix)	Paterson, Weston, Fehlmann	11:58
2.	"Towers of Dub" (Ambient Mix)	Paterson, Weston, Fehlmann	10:14
3.	"Blue Room" (Ambient at Mark Angelo's Mix)	Paterson, Weston, Giraudy, Hillage, Ward, Fraser	8:57
4.	"Close Encounters" (Ambient Mix 1)	Paterson, Weston, Meikle, McMillan	12:49
5.	"Majestic" (Mix 1)	Paterson, Weston, Glover	11:52
6.	"Assassin" (Chocolate Hills of Bohol Mix)	Paterson, Weston, Keogh	11:06
Total length:			2:24:22
