= FFWD =

Studio album by FFWD
- Released: 1994
- Recorded: 1993
- Genre: Electronic; ambient
- Label: Inter-Modo
- Producer: FFWD

Professional ratings
Review scores
Source	Rating
AllMusic	3/5 stars
Music Week	3/5 stars
Spin Alternative Record Guide	8/10

FFWD is an eponymous album by FFWD – Robert Fripp, Thomas Fehlmann, Kris Weston, and Dr Alex Paterson.

The title is also a play on the abbreviation often used on the fast forward control of a tape deck or CD player, also referenced in the "double-arrow" graphic used on the cover.

The album peaked at #48 in the UK Albums Chart in August 1994.

== Production ==
Fripp was recorded for hours improvising on his guitar; Weston constructed these improvisations into working parts for the album. Paterson and Fehlmann had no production input in this.

== Critical reception ==
Trouser Press wrote that "the modular systems-sounds of FFWD are neither danceable nor dreamable."

== Track listing ==
1. "Hidden" – 7:16
2. "Lucky Saddle – 6:40
3. "Drone" – 1:01
4. "Hempire" – 3:12
5. "Collossus" – 5:38
6. "What Time Is Clock" – 1:15
7. "Can of Bliss" – 3:15
8. "Elevenses" – 0:49
9. "Meteor Storm" – 4:25
10. "Buckwheat & Grits" – 10:51
11. "Klangtest" – 5:01
12. "Suess Wie Eine Nuss" – 8:20
