= WXXI Public Broadcasting Council =

Public broadcasting organization in Rochester, New York, US

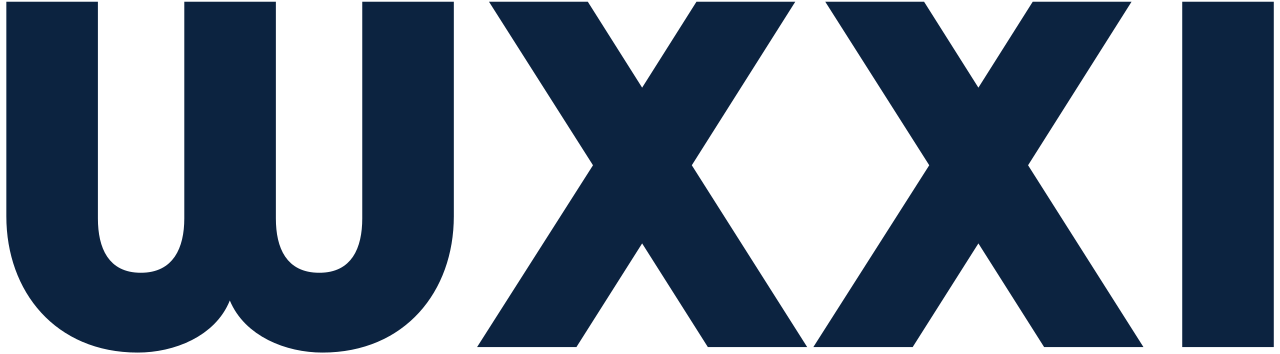
- Type: non-profit organization
- Industry: public television; community radio
- Founded: 1958
- Headquarters: Rochester, New York, United States
- Area served: Greater Rochester Area and the Finger Lakes Region
- Key people: Chris Hastings, President & CEO
- Revenue: 11,990,067 United States dollar (2017)
- Total assets: 26,652,508 United States dollar (2022)
- Subsidiaries: WXXI-TV; WXXI (AM); WXXI-FM; WXXO; Reachout Radio; WXXY; WRUR-FM (50%); WITH (FM) (50%); WEOS (FM) (50%); City Newspaper; Little Theatre
- Website: www.wxxi.org

The WXXI Public Broadcasting Council is a community non-profit organization of some 36,000 subscribing members in the Rochester metropolitan area, New York, that owns that city's major public television and community radio stations, a newspaper, and other broadcasting services.

The Public Broadcasting Council also partners with the City of Rochester to operate and program City12, a Government-access television (GATV) cable channel which airs Public-access television programming and live City Council meetings on a 15-hour daily schedule.

== History ==
It was first formed in 1958 by local educators and community leaders as the Rochester Area Educational Television Association to produce and provide Educational television programming to be seen on the city's commercial broadcasting television stations. During the early 1960s the organization raised funds to build its own independent non-commercial educational signal which would furnish daily educational, cultural, and informational programming during both school hours and prime-time evening hours for an all-ages family audience. WXXI-TV signed on in September 1966, from studios in the former East High School building in Rochester. Those facilities eventually proved unable to accommodate the station's growth in audience and local programming, and could not provide room for a planned FM non-commercial sister station, so WXXI built a new Public Broadcasting Center and opened it in December 1974. It was at that time, that companion station WXXI-FM (91.5) (now WXXO) was opened and became the Rochester community's first full-market-coverage nom-commercial educational and cultural radio station. Demand for full-time public radio service in both classical/fine arts and news/talk formats grew beyond the ability of one signal to serve. So in 1984, Rochester AM station WSAY was acquired and became WXXI (1370 AM), a regional service with a signal capable of reaching the six-county Rochester metropolitan region during the day. All local and NPR news/talk programming moved there on July 2 of that year. WXXI-FM then became a 24-hour classical and fine arts station.

The WXXO facility now includes not only analog FM service and the Reachout Radio subcarrier service for the blind and visually impaired, but full-market digital coverage on both HD-1 and HD-2 channels, the latter of which simulcasts WXXI AM in digital stereo. Later on, WXXI joined in partnership with the University of Rochester to operate WRUR-FM as a service with both news and adult alternative music and specialty programming, and took control of WJSL (now WXXY) in Houghton, New York, in the Southern Tier region to provide a mix of classical and news programming for a portion of the state which had previously been outside the range of a public signal. WXXI joined in partnership with Hobart and William Smith Colleges (operators of National Public Radio (NPR) affiliate WEOS in Geneva, New York) to provide an alternative non-commercial service for the southern Finger Lakes region: WITH in Ithaca opened during the spring of 2010.

WXXI-TV, meanwhile, continued to grow. The Public Broadcasting Center more than doubled in size in 1991, adding additional radio studios and three fully equipped TV production studios. It built a new digital full-service television transmitter capable of simultaneously transmitting four programming streams—the main WXXI-TV public signal in high definition, plus the World programming schedule, the Create schedule emphasizing the arts, instructional, and how-to programming, and the PBS Kids schedule of children's programming, all of which air 24 hours daily, plus a special training channel serving regional public safety agencies with professional Instructional television programming.

In 2012, WXXI announced a long term affiliation with the Little Theatre where WXXI took over operations of the venue. In December 2018, it was announced that WXXI via a for-profit arm was acquiring the main Rochester alternative weekly newspaper City Newspaper from its founders who were going into retirement.

On October 7, 2022, WXXI announced it would purchase WJZR from Lee Rust. The $1.2 million deal is structured as a $675,000 payment as well as an additional $525,000 donation by Rust to WXXI; the acquisition was completed on January 24, 2023. WXXI pledged to return the station to service in 2023 on a noncommercial basis as an FM frequency for the news/talk programming heard on WXXI (1370 AM); in May 2023, the new WXXI-FM (105.9) signed on, with the original WXXI-FM taking on the WXXO call sign.

In September 2024, Chris Hastings, a Peabody Award–winning documentary producer and former executive producer of the WORLD Channel at GBH in Boston, was named president and CEO of WXXI, succeeding Norm Silverstein, who had led the organization for nearly 29 years. Hastings is the third CEO in WXXI's history.

== Operations ==
=== Television ===
- WXXI-TV (channel 21) - Rochester's PBS member station, along with subchannels for Create and World and PBS Kids

=== Radio ===
- WXXI (AM) (1370) - news/talk with NPR, PRI, APM spoken word content along with local news
  - WXXI-FM (105.9) — an FM simulcast of WXXI (AM)
- WXXO (91.5) - all-classical music with hourly NPR News updates
  - WXXY (90.3) - a Houghton-based simulcast of WXXO for southern part of Rochester market
- Reachout Radio, the area's radio reading service provider
- WRUR-FM, a partnership with the University of Rochester providing eclectic music
- WEOS (FM), a partnership with Hobart and William Smith Colleges
- WITH (FM), a partnership with Hobart and William Smith Colleges

=== Print ===
- City Newspaper - an alternative weekly newspaper (via a for-profit arm)

=== Other ===
- Little Theatre - operated by WXXI
