= WXXO (FM) =

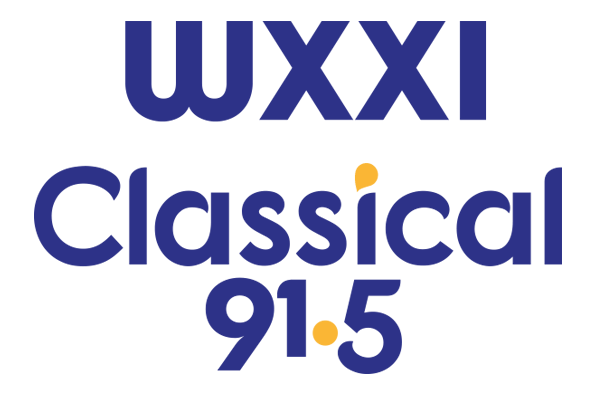
- Rochester, New York; United States
- Frequency: 91.5 MHz (HD Radio)
- Branding: WXXI Classical

Programming
- Format: Classical music
- Subchannels: HD2: Simulcast of WXXI AM–FM; HD3: News and information
- Affiliations: National Public Radio; Public Radio Exchange; American Public Media; Classical 24

Ownership
- Owner: WXXI Public Broadcasting Council
- Sister stations: WXXI; WXXI-FM; WXXI-TV

History
- First air date: December 23, 1974
- Former call signs: WXXI-FM (1973–2023)
- Call sign meaning: disambiguation of WXXI

Technical information
- Licensing authority: FCC
- Facility ID: 74218
- Class: B
- ERP: 45,000 watts
- HAAT: 134 meters (440 ft)
- Transmitter coordinates: 43.135°N 77.584°W
- Repeater: 90.3 WXXY (Houghton)

Links
- Public license information: Public file; LMS
- Webcast: Listen live
- Website: www.wxxiclassical.org

WXXO (91.5 FM) is a public, listener-supported radio station in Rochester, New York, airing a classical music radio format. Its programs can also be heard in Houghton on WXXY (90.3 FM) and on the seventh digital subchannel of WXXI-TV (channel 21). It is owned by the WXXI Public Broadcasting Council, which also owns WXXI-TV and a two-station news and information service, WXXI (1370 AM) and WXXI-FM 105.9. WXXO holds periodic fundraisers on the air to support the station.

WXXO has an effective radiated power (ERP) of 45,000 watts. The transmitter is located on Pinnacle Hill in Brighton. It is co-located with the towers for several Rochester FM and TV stations.

== History ==
The station signed on December 23, 1974, as WXXI-FM, the FM sister station to WXXI-TV. Its initial format was a mixture of classical music, folk music, jazz, news and talk. WXXI-FM switched to mostly classical music after the 1975 format change of WBFB (92.5 FM) from a commercial classical station to all-news radio. WBFB donated its classical music library to WXXI-FM, and WBFB program director Simon Pontin soon joined WXXI-FM as its morning host.

On July 2, 1984, WXXI-FM shifted most of its news programming, including NPR's Morning Edition and All Things Considered, to its new second service, WXXI (1370 AM). With the exception of some weekend and evening specialty programming, WXXI-FM became a full-time classical music service.

In 2007, WXXI-FM began broadcasting using HD Radio technology, offering a simulcast of WXXI on its HD2 channel and a third service of news and information on its HD3 channel.

On May 10, 2023, the station changed its call sign to WXXO with the WXXI-FM call sign moving to the former WJZR (105.9 FM) ahead of 105.9's relaunch as an FM simulcast of WXXI. Despite the change, WXXO continues to brand as "WXXI Classical".

=== WXXY ===
The station that is now WXXY originally signed on in 1979 as WJSL. It was the college radio station of Houghton College. Houghton sold the station to the WXXI Public Broadcasting Council in 1999; the ownership change saw WJSL replace a simulcast of religious programming from WMHR with WXXI-FM's classical programming. In August 2004, WJSL began carrying some of WXXI (AM)'s NPR News programming in drive time, along with the Saturday edition of Weekend Edition. The call sign was changed to WXXY in September 2009.

== Programming ==
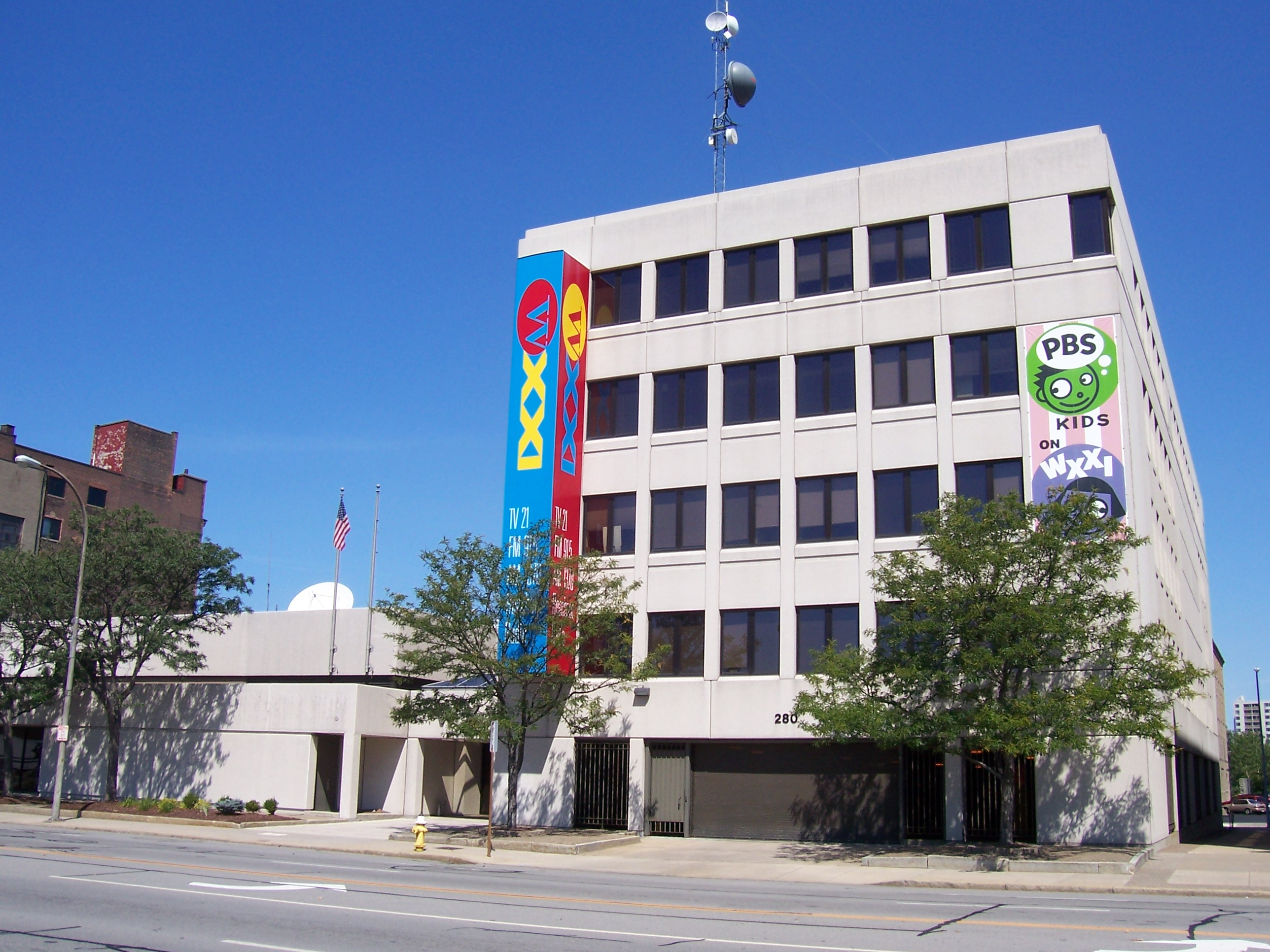
Headquarters in Rochester, New York

WXXO originates broadcasts of the Rochester Philharmonic Orchestra, hosted by Brenda Tremblay. WXXO also originates the national program With Heart and Voice, hosted first by Richard Gladwell and currently by Peter DuBois. It features sacred choral and organ music. Local live music broadcasts include Live from Hochstein and Backstage Pass. During late night and weekend hours, WXXO carries the national classical music service "Classical 24".

During drive time, WXXY breaks from the simulcast with WXXO to carry Morning Edition and All Things Considered in a simulcast with WXXI AM-FM.
