= WXXI-FM =

Simulcast of WXXI, Rochester
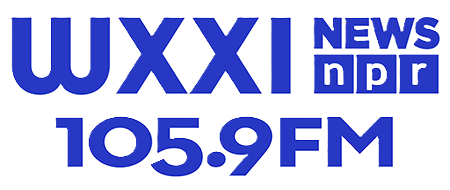
- Rochester, New York; United States
- Frequency: 105.9 MHz
- Branding: WXXI News

Programming
- Format: Public radio (news, talk, information)
- Affiliations: National Public Radio; American Public Media; Public Radio Exchange; BBC World Service; WNYC Studios

Ownership
- Owner: WXXI Public Broadcasting Council
- Sister stations: WXXI; WXXI-TV; WXXO

History
- First air date: January 22, 1993
- Former call signs: WJZR (1991–2023)
- Call sign meaning: derived from WXXI-TV ("XXI" is the Roman numeral for 21, WXXI-TV's channel number)

Technical information
- Licensing authority: FCC
- Facility ID: 49193
- Class: A
- ERP: 3,700 watts
- HAAT: 130 meters (430 ft)
- Transmitter coordinates: 43.135°N 77.584°W

Links
- Public license information: Public file; LMS
- Website: www.wxxinews.org

WXXI-FM (105.9 FM) is a non-commercial radio station in Rochester, New York, United States. It broadcasts news, talk and informational programming as a member station of National Public Radio (NPR). WXXI-FM is owned by the WXXI Public Broadcasting Council, Rochester's primary public broadcaster. The station was founded as WJZR in January 1993 by North Coast Radio, Inc., and broadcast a smooth jazz format for 29 years before it was taken silent in July 2022 upon the owner's retirement. Since May 2023, WXXI-FM has carried WXXI's news/talk service, which originates from WXXI (1370 AM).

The transmitter is on Pinnacle Hill Road off Highland Avenue in Brighton. The studios and offices are at the WXXI Public Broadcasting Center on State Street in Rochester.

== North Coast Radio ==
In November 1988, the Federal Communications Commission (FCC) designated a series of 14 applications for comparative hearing in order to determine who should be awarded a construction permit to build a new radio station on 105.9 MHz in Rochester. The commission awarded the permit to R. B. Lee Rust in December 1991. Rust was a second-generation station owner in Rochester; his father, Bill, had owned WHAM.

WJZR began broadcasting on January 22, 1993, with an eclectic jazz format. It was the second station Rust had managed with such a format, having set WGMC in Greece into the format previously in the 1980s. Rust's own personal music collection set the tone for WJZR; he categorized songs by such factors as attitude and so-called "thump". Rust also took the name North Coast Radio—which had been initially intended to refer only to the licensee—and used it as the station's overall brand instead of a set of call letters, feeling that it "makes Rochester sound more attractive, not just a cold, nondescript place". The station also set itself apart by airing no prerecorded commercials; the station's air staff read commercials live, and there were only six such ads an hour. Rapid consolidation of Rochester commercial radio stations meant that WJZR and Black-owned WDKX were the only independent outlets in the city by 1998; Rust rebuffed offers to sell his station.

By 2013, WJZR was a completely automated operation, with Rust as chief engineer, programmer, and the station's imaging voice; its commercial status made it more unusual as the number of full-time jazz outlets dwindled yet Rochester still had two stations in the format. Rust's extensive involvement in multiple facets of station operations also kept costs low. After 29 years, Rust announced he would retire and take the station silent; the last song on WJZR, played on the evening of July 10, 2022, was "In a Silent Way" by Miles Davis.

== Sale to WXXI ==
On October 7, 2022, the WXXI Public Broadcasting Council announced it would purchase WJZR from Rust. The $1.2 million deal was structured as a $675,000 payment as well as an additional $525,000 donation by Rust to WXXI; the acquisition was completed on January 24, 2023. WXXI pledged to return the station to service in 2023 on a noncommercial basis as an FM frequency for its news/talk programming, originating from WXXI (1370 AM), with a new call sign to be selected; on May 10, 2023, the station took on the WXXI-FM call sign, with the previous WXXI-FM (91.5) concurrently becoming WXXO. The new WXXI-FM soft launched on May 24, 2023.

WXXI-FM going live with a strong FM signal allowed WRUR-FM, which was airing afternoon programming from WXXI due to a lack of a strong FM signal for the all news station, to drop Connections with Evan Dawson and All Things Considered and go in a full time music direction.
