= WXXI (AM) =

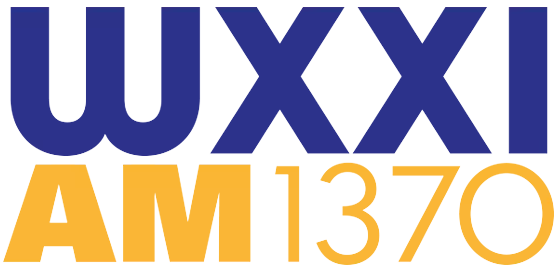

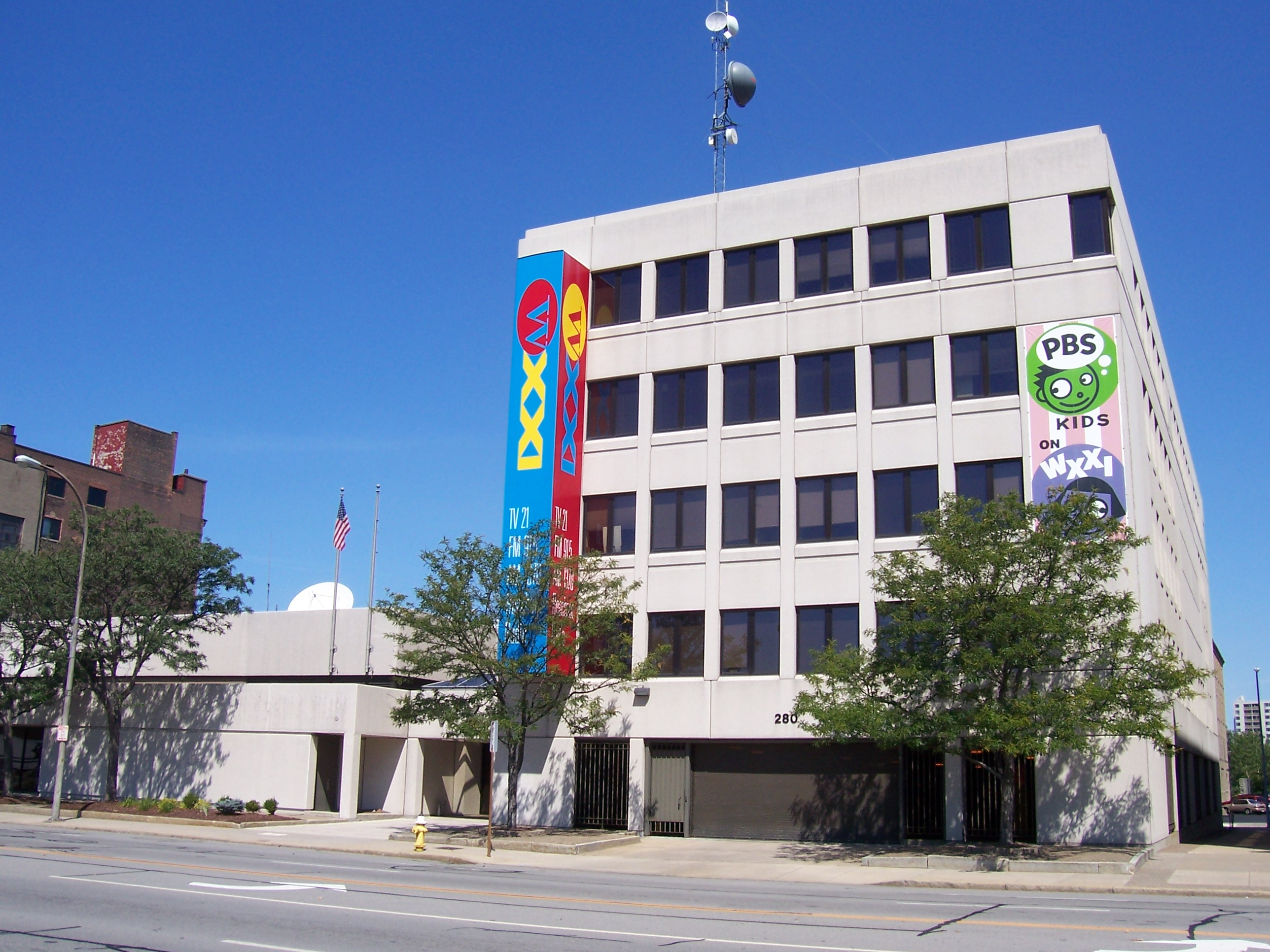
- Headquarters in Rochester, New York
- Rochester, New York; United States
- Frequency: 1370 kHz
- Branding: WXXI News

Programming
- Format: news/talk; public radio
- Affiliations: American Public Media; BBC World Service; National Public Radio; Public Radio Exchange

Ownership
- Owner: WXXI Public Broadcasting Council
- Sister stations: WXXI-FM; WXXI-TV; WXXO

History
- First air date: October 27, 1936
- Former call signs: WSAY (1936–1982); WRTK (1982–1984)
- Former frequencies: 1210 kHz (1936–1941); 1240 kHz (1941–1942)
- Call sign meaning: derived from WXXI-TV ("XXI" is the Roman numeral for 21, WXXI-TV's channel number)

Technical information
- Licensing authority: FCC
- Facility ID: 74220
- Class: B
- Power: 5,000 watts
- Transmitter coordinates: 43°06′01″N 77°34′23″W
- Repeaters: 105.9 WXXI-FM (Rochester); 91.5 WXXO-HD2 (Rochester)

Links
- Public license information: Public file; LMS
- Website: www.wxxi.org

WXXI (1370 kHz) is a non-commercial radio station in Rochester, New York. It broadcasts news, talk and informational programming as a member station of National Public Radio (NPR). WXXI, along with WXXI-FM 105.9, WXXO (91.5 FM), and WXXI-TV (channel 21), are owned by the WXXI Public Broadcasting Council. Its studios and offices are on State Street in Rochester at the WXXI Public Broadcasting Center. WXXI holds periodic on-air fundraisers to support the station.

WXXI is powered at 5,000 watts from a single non-directional antenna by day. At night, to protect other stations on 1370 AM from interference, it uses a directional antenna with a four-tower array that concentrates the signal in Rochester and its inner suburbs. Its transmitter is on French Road in Brighton. Programming is also heard on WXXI-FM and on an HD Radio digital subchannel of WXXO.

== Programming ==
Most of WXXI's weekday programming comes from NPR, along with local newscasts. NPR shows include Morning Edition, All Things Considered, Fresh Air, 1A, Marketplace and Here and Now. Weekdays at noon and repeated at 9 pm, a local two-hour interview and call-in show is heard, Connections with Evan Dawson. The BBC World Service airs overnight.

On weekends, shows from NPR are heard along with local newscasts. Programs include Wait, Wait, Don't Tell Me, It's Been A Minute, On The Media, Hidden Brain, TED Radio Hour, Radio Lab, Latino USA, Travel with Rick Steves, The Splendid Table, Milk Street Radio and The New Yorker Radio Hour. WXXI has won numerous local, state and national awards for its programs, newscasts and investigative reporting.

== History ==
=== WSAY ===
The station signed on the air on October 27, 1936, as WSAY. It was a facility founded and built by Gordon P. Brown as a small local area station with a 250 watt signal on 1210 kHz. As a result of the North American Regional Broadcasting Agreement (NARBA), it moved to 1240 kHz in 1941. In the pre-war era WSAY became best known as the home of local music programs at a time when its network-affiliated competitors were airing a mix of local news and sports with national drama, comedy and music/variety shows supplied by the NBC and CBS networks. WSAY also was the first station to hire an African-American announcer for a regular shift.

Following World War II, WSAY received FCC permission to improve its signal by moving to the regional 1370 kHz frequency. It relocated its transmitter from a downtown Rochester building with rooftop antenna to a modern four-tower plant in suburban Brighton. It increased power first to 1,000 watts and shortly afterward to 5,000 watts full-time. Over the next three decades, WSAY operated under a number of formats, from adult standards to Top 40 to progressive rock to country music.

=== WRTK ===
Gordon Brown owned WSAY until his death in 1979. His estate sold it to future Cumulus Media CEO Lew Dickey and his family.

The Dickey family operated 1370 AM from 1980 to 1984. It also tried a variety of formats from personality adult contemporary to country to talk radio. In 1982, the call sign was switched to WRTK.

=== Public radio ===
The license and facility was sold to the WXXI Public Broadcasting Council in early 1984. It briefly was taken dark as it prepared for a new format. In the summer 1984, it relaunched as WXXI (AM) with a round-the-clock noncommercial schedule of news, talk and public affairs. While the AM station focused on spoken-word programming, its sister station, WXXI-FM 91.5 was able to offer a full schedule of classical music.

On January 10, 2014, WXXI began simulcasting on FM translator W266CL. It originally was heard on 101.1 MHz. It moved to 107.5 FM on October 4, 2016, and the call sign was changed to W298CH. In August 2023, WXXI entered into an agreement to sell W298CH to the Ibero-American Action League, owners of WEPL-LP who used it to boost WEPL's reach in the market.

On October 7, 2022, WXXI announced its purchase of the license of WJZR (105.9 FM). WXXI announced its intention to relaunch 105.9 under a new call sign with a simulcast of WXXI (AM)'s public radio programming; the new WXXI-FM went on the air May 24, 2023.
