= WOKR =

WOKR may refer to:

- WOKR (AM), a radio station (1310 AM) licensed to serve Canandaigua, New York, United States
- WRSB (AM), a radio station (1590 AM) licensed to serve Brockport, New York, which held the call sign WOKR from 2015 to 2017
- WAWR, a radio station (93.5 FM) licensed to serve Remsen, New York, which held the call sign WOKR from 2005 to 2015
- WHAM-TV, a television station (channel 13) licensed to serve Rochester, New York, which held the call sign WOKR from 1962 to 2005
