= Superstation =

Television station carried by satellite

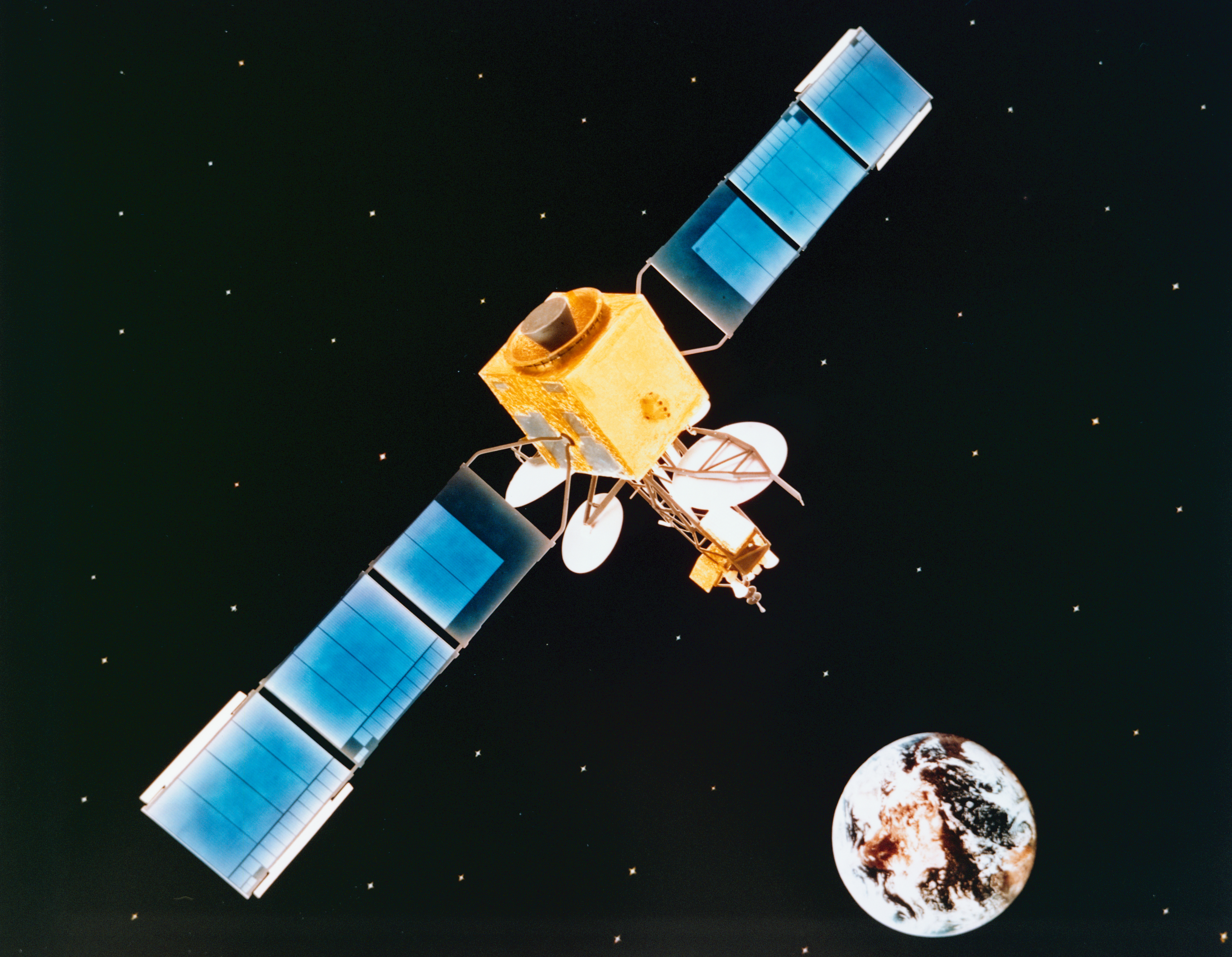
A typical communications satellite depicted in orbit over Earth. Satellites like these were used to uplink superstations beginning in the late 1970s.

In North American broadcasting, a superstation is a terrestrial television station that has its broadcast range extended outside of their originating media market via communications satellite to multichannel television providers, including cable and direct broadcast satellite. These stations, which had no network affiliation and operated as independents, were popularized from the late 1970s to the early 1990s with offerings of reruns, movies, local play-by-play sports coverage and, in some cases, local newscasts. These signals were also popular among C-band satellite subscribers in rural areas where broadcast signals could not be picked up off-air.

Superstation is defined by the Federal Communications Commission (FCC) as a television station that is additionally transmitted via satellite. Further legislation, in particular the Satellite Home Viewer Improvement Act of 1999, narrowed this definition further to specify the station must not have a network affiliation. Superstations either have an active or passive classification: active superstations intentionally seek retransmission via an outside provider, while passive superstations are involuntarily retransmitted without the station's consent. Superstation can also refer to major network affiliates uplinked by satellite to providers like Primetime 24 and Netlink USA.

The television stations commonly recognized as superstations are the following:

- KTLA Los Angeles
- KTVT Dallas–Fort Worth (1984–1994)
- KTVU San Francisco (1978–1980)
- KWGN-TV Denver
- WGN-TV Chicago (1978–2014)
- WOR-TV/WWOR-TV New York (1979–1996)
- WPIX New York City
- WSBK-TV Boston
- WTCG/WTBS Atlanta (1976–2007)
- CHAN-TV Vancouver, British Columbia
- CHCH-TV Hamilton, Ontario
- CITV-TV Edmonton, Alberta

"Superstation" is most closely associated with the concept's progenitor, WTCG in Atlanta. After previously extending their reach to cable systems in the southeastern United States through microwave relay, WTCG became the first television station to be uplinked to a satellite in 1976. Renamed WTBS in 1979, it promoted itself as "the Superstation" and later as "Superstation WTBS". The availability of superstations began to decline after 1990, when the FCC reinstated syndication exclusivity rules, forcing superstations to license content for national distribution or seek alternate programming from their parent stations. The distributor for WWOR's superstation feed began operating it separately as the WWOR EMI Service, WGN's feed gradually evolved into WGN America, and WTBS's feed was relaunched as TBS.

== Cable television and distant signals ==
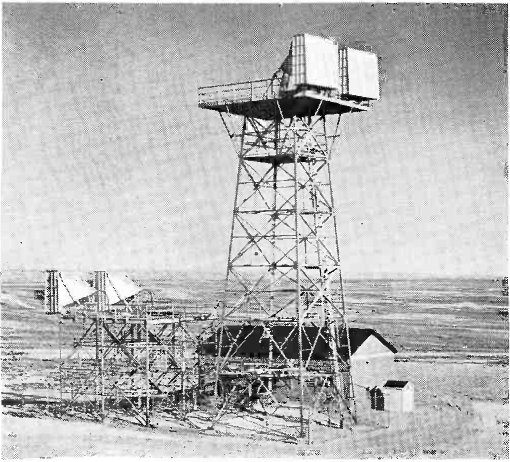
Microwave relay stations, like this AT&T station in Wyoming c. 1951, were used to amplify distant television signals.

The concept of extending a television station's range via pay television was not new. Early community antenna television (CATV) systems were restricted from retransmitting distant signals to communities no more than approximately 100 miles (160 km) from the closest signal; this was a detriment to many small communities too distant from any receivable signal. As a result, several communities in the Western United States began incorporating CATV systems using microwave relay systems that made it possible to retransmit broadcast signals over great distances. Starting in 1955, Inland Empire Microwave Co. began importing Spokane, Washington, station KHQ-TV (NBC) to a cable system in Richland via microwave relay; this was regarded as a technical feat given Richland's topography. The following year, Inland Microwave imported KREM-TV (ABC) to the same Richland system and imported KHQ, KREM and KXLY-TV (CBS) to a Pendleton, Oregon, system.

Carter Mountain Transmission Corp. was a microwave relay firm in Cody, Wyoming, that started importing distant signals for CATV systems. In 1959, Carter Mountain sought to retransmit KTWO-TV (NBC) in Casper, Wyoming, along with KOOK-TV (CBS) and KGHL-TV (ABC) in Billings, Montana, to CATV systems in Riverton, Lander and Thermopolis, all within the signal range of KWRB-TV in Riverton. While the Federal Communications Commission (FCC) initially granted the permit without a vote, KWRB owner Chief Washakie TV protested to the FCC, which issued a stay in 1960 pending an evidentiary hearing after determining KWRB was at risk of folding. This stay extended to five other CATV systems, including one in Helena, Montana, that imported Spokane stations, which caused the city's lone television station, KXLJ-TV, to go dark. The FCC rejected the Carter Mountain permit by majority vote in December 1961; dissenting commissioner John S. Cross called the decision a "bad law" and claimed it "sets an undesirable precedent". This denial was unanimously affirmed by the D.C. Court of Appeals which the U.S. Supreme Court declined to hear and became known as the "Carter Mountain Doctrine".

Two separate lawsuits helped enable the expansion of "proto-superstations". The first was filed in July 1961 by United Artists and WSTV in Steubenville, Ohio, over Fortnightly Corp. importing television stations from Pittsburgh and Wheeling, West Virginia, to systems in Fairmont and Clarksburg, West Virginia; the U.S. Supreme Court ruled in 1968 in Fortnightly Corp. v. United Artists Television, Inc. that distant signal retransmission did not constitute a "performance" and was not subject to copyright liability. The second lawsuit was filed by CBS in December 1964 over similar importation of larger-market stations by TelePrompTer Corporation to their small-market systems. Judge Constance Baker Motley of the U.S. District Court for the Southern District of New York ruled in 1972 in favor of TelePrompTer based on the Supreme Court's framework in Fortnightly v. United Artists.

The FCC instituted a broad package of cable industry regulations in February 1972. Cable systems in the top 100 markets were now allowed to carry distant signals "as a matter of right" and could import as many as two out-of-market stations; systems in smaller markets, excluding undefined markets, were restricted to carry three network affiliates and one independent. Also implemented were syndication exclusivity (syndex) rules compelling cable systems to blackout any and all syndicated programming on imported distant signals if they were also aired on an in-market station. The FCC adjusted these rules in August 1975, allowing systems to import signals in the overnight hours or after a local must-carry station's nightly sign-off, effectively operating as a timeshare. By December 1975, the FCC repealed "leapfrogging rules" limiting cable systems to select distant signals based on closeness to the respective system; the FCC's Cable Television Bureau argued superstations were unlikely to form due to a lack of evidence that television stations economically benefited from cable carriage.

Section 111 of the Copyright Act of 1976, passed by Congress on October 1, 1976, provided cable systems and satellite carriers with a compulsory license allowing them to retransmit copyrighted programming from any over-the-air stations across the country, regardless of the station's consent. To administer these royalty fee payments and rates, the U.S. Copyright Office established the Copyright Royalty Tribunal (CRT).

== The proto-superstations ==
Eastern Microwave Inc. (EMI) was established in 1961 in Oneonta, New York, both to import distant signals and connect network affiliates in Upstate New York. The following year, EMI began relaying WPIX in New York City, chosen due to their heavy sports presence, to CATV systems in Oneonta and surrounding areas. In March 1965, EMI started distributing WPIX, WNEW-TV and WOR-TV to systems in Canajoharie and Carthage. Newhouse Broadcasting, a subsidiary of Advance Publications, acquired EMI with five Upstate New York cable systems in 1965. Largely attributed to the station's acquisition of Minnesota Twins games, WTCN-TV in Minneapolis–Saint Paul found cable carriage by 1963 throughout Minnesota and Wisconsin. In the early 1970s, WTCN was available in North Dakota and Iowa. KBMA-TV in Kansas City, Missouri, had a cable footprint in 1972 that spanned 200,000 cable households in seven states. By 1981, KBMA's cable reach was 600,000 homes in six states.

In 1962, H&B Microwave began importing WGN-TV in Chicago to Dubuque FM-TV Cable in Dubuque, Iowa, owing to the station's local sports presence; WFLD, also in Chicago, was added by Dubuque FM-TV after that station added the Chicago White Sox. WGN soon began to be imported via microwave to other cable systems throughout the Midwest, and by 1978, enjoyed carriage on 574 systems and a footprint of 8.6 million subscribers. The Christian Broadcasting Network (CBN)'s WYAH-TV in Portsmouth, Virginia enjoyed significant regional coverage as their emphasis on religious fare, alongside reruns and classic movies, qualified it as a specialty channel and exempt from "leapfrogging rules". WYAH and CBN's KXTX-TV in Dallas–Fort Worth continued to be available extensively on cable into the early 1980s, years after CBN uplinked a cable channel of their own to satellite.

Two Cleveland independents, WKBF-TV and WUAB, attained regional coverage on cable systems; when WKBF shut down in 1975, WUAB and WKBD-TV in Detroit inherited much of WKBF's footprint. In 1970, KTXL in Sacramento, California, extended its reach to systems in Reno, Nevada; by 1975, KTXL was available in Salt Lake City and—at night—as far away as Rapid City, South Dakota, the following year.

== WTCG, the first national superstation ==
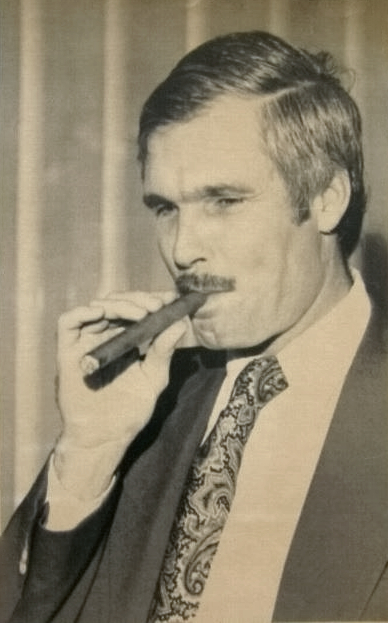
Ted Turner, c. 1976

WTCG, an independent station in Atlanta, began expanding its reach to cable systems via microwave in 1972 when owner Ted Turner was approached by Andy Goldman, marketing director for TelePrompTer's systems in Alabama that boasted 200,000 subscribers; Goldman regarded WTCG's fare—including Atlanta Braves and Atlanta Hawks telecasts, reruns and movies—as "a product worth someone putting up $4.95 for". While WTCG did not receive compensation from these systems, it did profit substantially from direct response advertising, whose revenue grew alongside WTCG's cable footprint. WTCG was eventually distributed to other parts of the Southeastern United States including Tennessee, North Carolina, South Carolina and Florida. The station had been billing itself as "Super 17" since Turner took ownership in 1970, originally as a tongue-in-cheek reference as the station had, until 1973, consistently lost money.

Goldman, who became TelePrompTer's vice president of marketing, informed Turner in 1975 of premium cable service Home Box Office (HBO)'s plans to transmit nationwide using communications satellites, elevating it from a regional pay television channel. Turner learned through research that WTCG could be uplinked via their transmitter to satellite and made available to cable and C-band satellite services across the country, providing cable operators desiring additional channels with his programming, all while being a cost-effective alternative from microwave and telephone landlines. HBO was uplinked for the first time to carry the "Thrilla in Manila" boxing match on October 1, 1975. The following month, at the 1975 Western Cable Show in Anaheim, California, Turner announced that WTCG was looking at a satellite uplink of their own; KTXL owner Jack Matranga also disclosed his station's interest in being uplinked.

After signing a deal with RCA American Communications for transponder space, Turner established Southern Satellite Systems (SSS) as a common carrier uplink provider to serve as WTCG's redistributor. Turner raised enough capital to support SSS through loans by First Chicago Bank, Chase Bank and Chemical Bank, and pension funds like TIAA. To bypass FCC rules requiring a common carrier to be a middleman between WTCG and cable providers, Turner sold SSS in March 1976 to former Western Union vice president of marketing Edward L. Taylor for $1. After the deal closed, Turner and SSS signed an agreement to uplink WTCG to Satcom 1, while SSS leased a Series 8000 Satellite Earth Terminal from Scientific Atlanta. In making the announcement, Turner suggested WTCG could potentially become the impetus for a fourth television network, an idea he continued to hold into the early 1980s. While testifying before the House Subcommittee on Communication in June 1976, Turner advocated for cable systems to be able to import additional signals to benefit the consumer, and saw WTCG as a safe, family-friendly alternative leaning on classic movies and sports.

WTCG first used a satellite uplink on October 27, 1976, to feed an Atlanta Hawks–Los Angeles Lakers game back to the station via a newly constructed earth station in North Atlanta. After winning approval from the FCC to serve as a common carrier for WTCG on December 17, 1976, SSS uplinked the station to four cable systems in Grand Island, Nebraska, Newport News, Virginia, Troy, Alabama, and Newton, Kansas, at 1 p.m. ET (12 p.m. CT). In its approval, the FCC praised the uplink proposal by SSS as "an innovative combination of new technology and established practices". SSS initially charged cable systems 10 cents per subscriber to transmit WTCG full-time and 2 cents per subscriber to carry it as an overnight, post-sign-off timeshare, which WTCG itself did not earn any profit from. By June 1977, WTCG was available to 800,000 homes in 17 states, and was available on TelePrompTer's New York City systems in October 1978. At that time, WTCG's rate card was adjusted to better reflect the national cable audience; by 1982, the station had sales offices in Atlanta, New York and Chicago.

His station was already one of only a few stations offering programming 24 hours a day, and it was sending out 30 movies a week from a 2,700-film library he had quietly built up, along with reruns that now range from Leave It to Beaver to All in the Family to a recently purchased block of 174 hours of high class BBC and Time-Life programming. The sports teams were secure -- he owned them.

No wonder the sudden network flowered: Turner was exporting Atlanta like Holland exports tulips, with one big difference. You have to pay for the tulips.

— Christian Williams, on Ted Turner

WTCG's growing availability on cable led the Motion Picture Association of America (MPAA), concerned about potential financial losses on programs distributed by MPAA members that aired on superstations, to petition the FCC in 1977 for an investigation. The MPAA was supported by the National Association of Broadcasters (NAB) along with Kelly Broadcasting, McGraw-Hill Broadcasting and Taft Television & Radio Company; WHIZ-TV in Zanesville, Ohio, considered superstations as "threatening" and the FCC's approval of them as "unconstitutional". The MPAA also lodged an effort to deny SSS's application to grant an expansion of WTCG's service to Puerto Rico, Alaska and Canada. In turn, Turner vowed to air increased amounts of highbrow and educational programming over WTCG and institute twice-hourly news updates beyond the bare minimum of news the station had been notorious for.

By May 1978, WTCG was being received by 1.5 million households in 45 states, increasing by 100,000 households per month; by the end of that year, the station was available through cable systems in all 50 states. WTCG changed its call sign to WTBS on August 27, 1979, alongside with a corporate name change to Turner Broadcasting System. Turner also registered a trademark on "Superstation". With the renaming, reports surfaced that the personnel Turner hired to launch CNN in the summer of 1980 were also considering a nightly newscast over WTBS. In both 1982 and 1983, Turner Broadcasting garnered half of the advertising revenue generated by the entire cable industry. WTBS remained the most widely distributed superstation throughout the 1980s: in 1987, WTBS was available to 41.6 million cable and satellite subscriber households nationwide.

Aside from Turner's use of WTBS to help launch his other cable ventures, SSS used the WTBS signal for the national distribution of teletext. By 1982, SSS was distributing services from United Press International, Reuters, Dow Jones, and View Weather for extraction by cable operators to be displayed as their own channels. In 1982, Keyfax, a national teletext magazine from Field Enterprises, debuted on the WTBS vertical blanking interval (VBI) using the British teletext standard, World System Teletext. In 1985, SSS switched to offering Electra, a service of Taft Broadcasting.

== Other emerging superstations ==
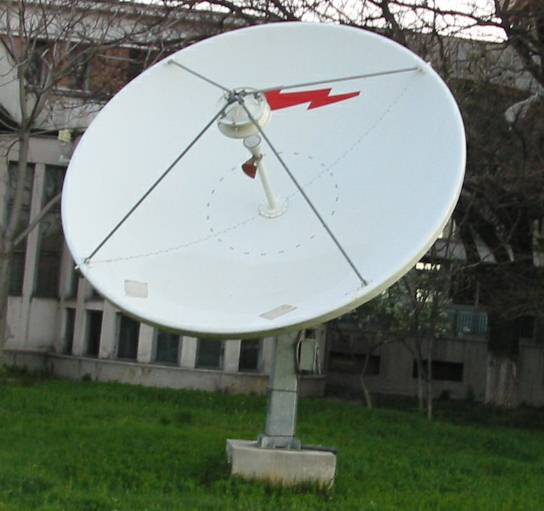
A typical C-band satellite dish

On October 25, 1978, the FCC implemented an "open entry" policy for satellite carriers wanting to uplink local television stations, and began reviews on existing applications. The next day, the FCC gave approval to four different carriers to uplink WGN-TV: United Video Satellite Group, Inc., SSS, American Microwave & Communications and Midwestern Relay Company. The FCC's decision to grant all four applications was based on wanting to bring "a diversity of service" to the public. The "open entry" policy elicited "anger to passive resistance" among program distributors, who were concerned about not being properly compensated for shows airing on superstations. The FCC also repealed a requirement for cable systems to request waivers to carry distant signals, instead compelling local stations who would object to submit proof of economic harm; this policy change was seen as a significant deregulation move allowing additional superstations to be created.

Satellite Communication Systems (SCS), a joint venture of Holiday Inns and SSS, sought to retransmit KTVU in Oakland–San Francisco. SSS also applied to uplink KTTV in Los Angeles and WPIX in New York City, while both EMI and United Video applied to uplink WOR-TV and WSBK-TV in Boston; EMI planned to rebroadcast WCBS-TV whenever WOR would sign-off in the overnight hours. SSS withdrew from uplinking WGN-TV after falling into a lease dispute with RCA over their assigned Satcom transponder, prompting United Video to assert uplink responsibilities. WGN-TV was uplinked to Satcom-3 by United on November 9, 1978, and within one week, was available to an estimated 200 cable systems and 1.5 million subscribers throughout the country. After learning WGN would be uplinked, Turner said, "Hallelujah, I'm looking for them". Despite the added exposure the station was provided, WGN-TV sought to market itself to the Chicago market, deriving no money from United Video; this stance was also to avoid the risk of paying national advertising rates to program syndicators. The uplink resulted in the NCAA withdrawing a package of college basketball games from WGN, which were offered to a competing Chicago station.

KTVU was uplinked next on December 16, 1978, by SCS onto a Satcom-1 transponder. Holiday Inns Inc. withdrew from the SSS partnership by April 1979, leaving the latter to handle uplink and promotional responsibilities for KTVU. SCS was unsuccessful in marketing KTVU at the level of WTBS or WGN-TV, and by April 1980, Warner-Amex Satellite Entertainment purchased SCS specifically for KTVU's transponder space. Warner-Amex sought the satellite space for its own cable channels, including Star Channel, Nickelodeon and MTV. United uplinked a Chicago classical music radio station, WFMT, to Satcom I in May 1979 as a cable radio feed; this allowed WFMT to be available throughout the United States and over two dozen countries overseas including the Soviet Union and China. Other than some limited revenue from a scant number of national advertisers, WFMT earned no extra revenue from its expanded distribution.

In March 1979, Metromedia filed an objection to the FCC over ASN Inc.'s request to uplink KTTV as an "involuntary superstation" and sought to halt any further proceedings on superstation signals. Metromedia claimed such retransmission violated the Communications Act which required the station owner's consent, even though Section 111 of the 1976 Copyright Act allowed such importation. The NAB filed a concurrent petition (joined by the MPAA, the NBA, the NHL, MLB Commissioner Bowie Kuhn, Tribune and ABC) urging the FCC to conduct an expedited rulemaking limiting the reach of superstations, claiming they threatened to undermine local stations by taking away the exclusivity of syndicated programming. ASN ceased operations over financial issues, rendering the KTTV petition moot.

Superstation cable penetration in the United States
Channel	Total cable households, 1987	Total cable households, 1983
WTBS	41,600,000	27,000,000
WGN-TV	22,000,000	11,000,000
WOR-TV	10,000,000	6,000,000
WPIX ^{†}	2,000,000
KTVT ^{†}	2,000,000
^{†} WPIX and KTVT were both uplinked to satellite in 1984.

EMI, who had already distributed WOR-TV via microwave throughout much of the Northeastern U.S., uplinked the station to transponder 17 of Satcom I in April 1979 for nationwide distribution. EMI also received approval to retransmit WSBK pending a future Satcom launch later in 1979 but upon learning they could only access one transponder, EMI selected WOR over WSBK following an internal survey. As EMI was a part of Advance's cable division, 22 out of the 23 cable systems Advance operated carried the WOR superstation feed. WOR's distribution, while broad, was still regionally scattered and paced far behind WTBS and WGN into the 1990s.

After acquiring WPIX's retransmission rights from Southern Satellite Systems, United Video uplinked WPIX on May 1, 1984, over Westar V. United also uplinked KTVT over Satcom IV on July 1, 1984, with station owner Gaylord Broadcasting's support; Gaylord believed cable systems could be persuaded to upgrade from receiving KTVT over microwave. KTVT's transponder was relocated to Spacenet III in December 1988. EMI uplinked KTLA and WSBK on February 15, 1988, for regional distribution via Satcom I-R; both stations were selected for their local sports coverage and were scrambled from the onset using the Videocipher II encryption system. Tribune, which also owned KTLA, opposed the uplink when notified by EMI but had no legal recourse. An EMI representative told KTLA station manager Michael Eigner, "we understand your reluctance, but we're going to do it anyway". United Video took over for marketing KTLA's superstation feed by that April. By 1993, United Video accounted for two-thirds of parent company UVSG's cash flow, aided by Tribune receiving compensation by the cable systems via copyright fees.

The lack of legal recourse by television stations led two different companies, Primetime 24 and Netlink USA, to uplink network affiliates for cable systems and home dish markets in areas without a, or any, network affiliate. Primetime 24 was a package of WABC-TV (ABC), WBBM-TV (CBS) and WXIA-TV (NBC), while Netlink distributed KUSA (ABC), KCNC-TV (NBC), KMGH-TV (CBS), KRMA (PBS) and KWGN-TV, all in Denver; WNYW-TV (Fox) was also uplinked to gauge cable company and subscriber interest. Netlink replaced KWGN with KDVR (Fox), then re-uplinked KWGN by October 1987. Both services uplinked these stations without any permission or consent. In the early 1990s, the Denver Metro Convention and Visitors Bureau began running advertisements on the Netlink-uplinked stations, resulting in a rise in international tourism; a 1994 mail-in contest with a grand prize of a trip to Denver yielded entries from Canada, Mexico, Belize, Costa Rica, Guatemala, Honduras and Nicaragua.

== Deregulation and copyright law ==
The FCC repealed their remaining distant signal importation and syndex rules by a 4–3 majority vote on July 22, 1980, determining local stations "are not adversely affected" by out-of-market stations imported on cable. Malrite Broadcasting sued the FCC in the Eastern District of New York, claiming the repeals would "endanger young independents". The NAB and Field Communications also filed stay motions to the commission, which were denied. The Eastern District unanimously affirmed the repeals on June 19, 1981, which the U.S. Supreme Court declined to review.

In April 1981, Tribune Broadcasting filed a copyright infringement suit against United Video in the Northern District of Illinois, charging United inserted teletext content from its Dow Jones business news service over the satellite feed's vertical blanking interval (VBI) during WGN's newscasts and other local programs in place of teletext listings data the station was relaying to United's Electronic Program Guide (EPG) service, in violation of the Copyright Act's passive carrier rules. In October 1981, District Court Judge Susan Getzendanner denied an injunction and dismissed the case, determining United was not required to carry the station's teletext transmission. The U.S. Court of Appeals for the Northern District of Illinois disagreed, ruling in August 1982 that United Video must retransmit WGN-TV's VBI teletext where directly related to and part of the 9 p.m. news simulcast, noting that United had no grounds to claim the unseen teletext exempted it from copyright liability as the Copyright Act's definition of what constituted a public performance was broad enough to encompass indirect transmission through cable affiliates.

By the fall of 1981, the MPAA, the NAB, sports leagues and copyright holders requested the Copyright Office raise royalty rates to compensate for losses incurred by distant signals and syndex deregulation. The CRT responded on October 22, 1982, by enacting a 3.75 percent royalty fee of cable systems' gross receipts for each distant signal (Note: This fee only applied if the cable system's semi-annual revenue exceeded $214,000.) along with a syndex surcharge on distant signals. Cable industry executives, lobbyists, and NCTA president Tom Wheeler objected to the increases, on concerns superstations would be removed from systems and independent stations benefitting from the extended audience would be harmed. The NCTA estimated about 6.3 million subscribers nationwide lost one or more distant signals from their cable system when the fees were imposed on March 15, 1983. Prior to this, various distant signals lost a combined 493 system clearances, with WTBS, WGN-TV and WOR-TV accounting for half of the losses. Many systems opted to replace distant signals with Cable Health Network, which added 1.2 million subscribers. Later estimates showed WTBS lost 320,000 subscribers, Eastern Microwave recouped around 200,000 subscribers for WOR, and United Video recouped around 600,000 of its CRT-related losses of 1.2 million subscribers by May.

== Impact on professional sports ==
While professional sports teams benefited heavily from exposure on superstations—namely, WTBS with the Braves and the Hawks, and WGN-TV with the Cubs, White Sox and Bulls—such coverage met resistance from both the National Basketball Association (NBA) and Major League Baseball (MLB). In particular, MLB regarded superstation carriage as detrimental towards the revenue from their national TV contracts. (Note: In 1992, ESPN televised 175 baseball games as part of a broader $100 million per year deal at a per-game cost of $571,428, approximately 12 times more than what WTBS, WGN, WWOR and WPIX paid cumulatively that year (435 games for an annual fee of $20 million or a per-game cost of $46,000).) Former Tribune vice president John Madigan argued superstation telecasts actually helped attendance and that the leagues were using them as a scapegoat.

The only federal restriction on sports events shown on superstations and other imported signals was the "same-game rule", enacted by the FCC in June 1975. This rule prohibited cable systems from retransmitting sporting events through a distant signal within a 35 miles (56 km) zone around the city of the home team's arena if the game is not airing on local television. A subsequent amendment required the broadcast rightsholder to inform local cable systems of any deletions no later than Monday of the preceding calendar week. The National Hockey League (NHL) suggested the protection zone be across a team's home market, while the National Football League (NFL) and MLB advocated for a 75-mile (121 km) zone. MLB also sought a 20-mile (32 km) zone around the cities of minor league franchises and a 35-mile (56 km) zone around a team's local television rightsholder.

In April 1981, Mets owner Doubleday Sports Inc. informed EMI the team was exercising all rights to Mets telecasts outside New York City, and WOR's superstation feed needed to prerecord all Mets telecasts for time-delay rebroadcast. EMI sued in United States District Court for the Northern District of New York, claiming WOR's superstation feed telecasts were not copyright infringement and thus should be exempt from any royalties. District Judge Neal P. McCurn ruled on March 12, 1982, that EMI and other satellite carriers were liable for royalty payments to program suppliers, but this ruling was reversed by the U.S. Second Circuit Court of Appeals that May, affirming EMI's stance as a "passive" carrier seeking to retransmit "a marketable station", thereby exempt from royalty fees under the Copyright Act; the U.S. Supreme Court declined review.

=== MLB vs. superstations ===
Under MLB Commissioner Bowie Kuhn, the league imposed a tax on superstation telecasts through a 24–2 vote, with the Braves and Cubs dissenting. Kuhn's successor, Peter Ueberroth, implemented the tax as a revenue sharing plan; WTBS was the first to agree to this tax, with WGN, WPIX, WOR-TV and KTVT following suit. WGN participated out of reluctance as their passive superstation status meant they had no accounting in place for their national audience. Ueberroth regarded superstations as "tearing baseball apart" by infringing on other teams' home markets and often outrating their local stations. KTVT's agreement came alongside Edward Gaylord (president of Gaylord Broadcasting) purchasing a minority stake in the Texas Rangers; Ueberroth invoked a "best interests of baseball" clause to overturn a prior rejection by American League owners of Gaylord's purchase. Gaylord had right of first refusal to purchase the Rangers outright, which he attempted to exercise once in 1986 and twice in 1989, all of which were rejected. The revenue sharing tax reflected each superstation's reach; by 1992, WTBS and WGN paid $12 million and $6 million, respectively, reflecting WTBS's 58 million subscribers and WGN's 35 million subscribers. WWOR (Note: Renamed from WOR-TV in 1987.) and WPIX, by comparison, each paid $1 million.

Fay Vincent, who took over as MLB Commissioner, petitioned the FCC in 1990 to redefine their non-duplication rules to force cable systems to blackout sports broadcasts on superstations, drawing criticism from Turner, Tribune and the NCTA. Vincent asked Congress in 1992 to repeal the compulsory copyright license and insert an amendment to the Cable Television Consumer Protection and Competition Act forcing superstations to enforce blackouts of sporting events if a conflict occurred with a local telecast of the same game. This spurred an on-air campaign by Turner that saw responses mostly in opposition by over 17,000 viewers. Vincent implemented an MLB rule change to local broadcast agreements allowing a team to terminate the contract if the station was retransmitted to more than 200,000 households outside of the team's territory. In July 1992, Vincent proposed to realign the National League (NL) by moving the Cubs and St. Louis Cardinals to the National League West, along with the Braves and Cincinnati Reds to the National League East, for the 1993 season. Tribune filed a breach of contract lawsuit against Vincent, claiming the proposal would dilute team rivalries, and force WGN-TV to carry an increased number of West Coast games with start times after 9 p.m. CT, threatening to depress advertising revenue. U.S. District Judge Suzanne B. Conlon issued a preliminary injunction in favor of Tribune and the Cubs. Vincent lost a no confidence vote among MLB owners on September 4, 1992, and resigned as commissioner three days later. Due to his departure, the proposed blackout amendment Vincent advocated for failed to advance in the Senate.

=== The NBA vs. superstations ===
The NBA also undertook actions to limit superstation telecasts of the league's games. In 1982, the NBA prohibited telecasting by stations reaching at least 5 percent of all out-of-market cable households that conflicted with those shown on ESPN and USA Network. By 1985, the league imposed a 25-game per season limit on superstations, sixteen fewer than the 41-game maximum under existing NBA local broadcast rules. Then-NBA Commissioner David Stern issued a further reduction for superstations to a 20-game limit under concerns telecasts of the Bulls on WGN and the Hawks on WTBS would impact the league's contracts with NBC and ESPN. Tribune Broadcasting and the Bulls jointly sued the NBA over this reduction, claiming the limit was intended to phase out NBA telecasts over superstations completely, pushed by Stern without any owner input.

Four separate rulings were issued in favor of Tribune and the Bulls by Northern District of Illinois Judge Hubert L. Will, the Seventh Circuit Court of Appeals, the U.S. Supreme Court and again by Judge Will. Consequently, WGN-TV was allowed to air at least 30 Bulls telecasts over its local and national feeds between the 1992–93 and 1995–96 seasons. A Seventh Circuit judiciary panel overturned their prior ruling on September 10, 1996, forcing WGN-TV to relegate the 35 Bulls games it was scheduled to air during the 1996–97 season exclusively to the Chicago area signal. The embargoed Bulls telecasts were supplanted on the superstation feed with alternate programming, at times also pre-empting WGN's 9 p.m. news on nights when Bulls games overran into the time slot. A settlement reached between WGN, the Bulls and the NBA in December 1996 allowed the Chicago signal to carry 41 games for the remainder of the season while the superstation feed could air 12 games. The ruling against WGN and the Bulls led Tele-Communications Inc. to remove WGN's superstation feed outright in December 1996, affecting around 3.5 million subscribers; TCI later made a partial reversal and reinstated the superstation feed, but in Midwestern states only.

=== WTBS and TNT Sports ===
Through the Turner Sports division, WTBS was able to supplement their Atlanta sports broadcasts with more national fare. WTBS acquired a package of regular season NBA games involving the league's other teams, early round conference playoff games and the NBA draft beginning with the 1984–85 season and continuing until 2002, when the NBA cable rights shifted to co-owned TNT. Professional wrestling remained a staple over WTBS (and later also over TNT) until 2001, when World Championship Wrestling, a promotion Turner owned, was shut down. WTBS also aired NCAA college football from 1981 to 1992 and again from 2002 to 2007, various NASCAR races through 2001 and the Goodwill Games.

== Syndex implementation ==
On May 18, 1988, the FCC re-enacted syndication exclusivity rules, this time granting local television stations the ability to claim exclusive rights to syndicated programs and compel cable systems to blackout any out-of-market stations, including superstations, that carried said programs. The law also closed a terrestrial loophole allowing superstations to pay local single market rates for programs while also selling their extended coverage to advertisers. The satellite television industry was largely exempt from syndex via the Satellite Home Viewer Act of 1988, as they served households without a local network affiliate. A 1991 FCC inquiry over extending syndex to home dish services ended with the commission deeming it "technically and economically infeasible". The Satellite Home Viewer Improvement Act in 1999 allowed satellite providers the ability to carry local broadcast signals; the FCC was required to develop rules protecting them, much as had been the case with cable, and in 2000 approved network non-duplication, syndex, and sports blackout rules.

Several superstations sought to indemnify cable systems over potential blackouts. WTBS was able to license the majority of programming for both the Atlanta and superstation feeds and called themselves "100% blackout-free". United Video and Tribune made efforts to clear as much of WGN-TV's programming on the superstation feed as possible, and United Video had in place a contingency plan to lease a second satellite for any blacked-out shows. Conversely, WWOR carried popular reruns including Kate & Allie, The Cosby Show and Knight Rider that were heavily susceptible to syndex claims. EMI opted to purchase programs to replace those over WWOR that would be unavailable outside of the New York City market due to syndex, estimated at 15 to 20 hours of preemptions a week. Many of the acquired programs were sourced from WWOR's then-owner MCA Inc. alongside shows from the Christian Science Monitor's television service. When the WWOR EMI Service launched on January 1, 1990, fifteen programs on WWOR's lineup were not cleared. By 1991, EMI programmed seven hours a day on the WWOR EMI Service and handled all advertising during those hours; WGN's superstation feed had five hours of alternate programming per day, but were sourced by WGN itself.

WGN and WTBS saw little negative impact to their distribution following the syndex implementation, with WGN benefiting from provider removals of other superstations during the early 1990s. WWOR both lost 500,000 subscribers and added 1 million households; while WWOR lost carriage on some cable systems in favor of TNT, other systems removed WSBK in favor of the WWOR EMI Service. In several cases, regional superstations which had no replacement feed for blackouts were removed outright due to syndex. This resulted in complaints from cable subscribers over the loss of regional sports play-by-play. One Providence, Rhode Island, cable system removed WPIX upon the syndex rollout, but later set up a local channel to rebroadcast WPIX's Yankees telecasts in exchange for full-time copyright fees to United Video. This followed public pressure from Providence City Council and the Rhode Island Department of Public Utilities and Carriers.

The WWOR EMI Service and WPIX each saw their distribution erode during the early 1990s, as cable systems that carried either superstation began replacing them with WGN's national feed. KTVT lost its superstation status altogether in 1994 after affiliating with CBS as a result of a nationwide television affiliation realignment; 500,000 subscribers, mostly in Texas, were affected.

== Evolution and decline ==
WWOR-TV and WGN-TV's superstation feeds were affected by the concurrent launches of UPN and The WB. In December 1993, Time Warner allowed Tribune and United Video to carry The WB over WGN-TV's national feed, and WGN-TV signed up as a WB charter affiliate. WGN-TV's signing also resulted in The WB programming one night per week instead of two to accommodate WGN's sports commitments; WB shows over the superstation feed would be blacked out in any markets with an existing WB affiliate. By August 1995, Tribune purchased an ownership stake in The WB. The superstation feed dropped The WB in October 1999 in favor of acquired programming after the network's affiliate base grew to a point the satellite feed was redundant.

In direct contrast, WWOR-TV affiliated with UPN as then-owner United Television was also a co-owner of the network. However, the WWOR EMI Service was restricted from carrying UPN, leading it to run alternate shows in prime time. This restriction was not extended to WSBK, whose audience was limited to New England. The WWOR EMI Service was shut down on December 31, 1996, by Advance Entertainment Corporation (renamed from EMI) in response to a forthcoming increase in royalties fees from the CRT. By then, all of WWOR's popular shows were inaccessible on the EMI Service, with the replacement fare seen as "inferior" by comparison. About 12.5 million cable subscribers were affected. The satellite transponder was sold to Discovery Networks for Animal Planet.

Tribune assumed responsibilities for WGN's superstation feed from Gemstar–TV Guide International, which acquired United Video, in 2002. Aside from local newscasts and some sports play-by-play, WGN's superstation feed increasingly relied less on WGN-TV as fewer syndicated programs were able to be given national clearance. Following a bankruptcy and leveraged buyout-driven managerial change at Tribune in 2008, WGN's superstation feed was rebranded as WGN America amid plans to convert it to a basic cable channel. WGN America dropped all remaining WGN-TV simulcasts on December 15, 2014; the following month, WGN America was introduced to Chicago-area cable systems for the first time.

Time Warner, by then the parent of WTBS owner Turner Broadcasting System, converted WTBS's superstation feed to basic cable channel TBS on January 1, 1998. This conversion required approval from ESPN for TBS to retain broadcast rights to the Braves, only now as a national contract and without Turner paying superstation royalties; Time Warner acquired broadcast rights to feature films for both TBS and TNT as a potential backup had an agreement not been reached. As a basic cable channel, TBS could collect subscriber fees not available as a superstation; as this also required renegotiations among cable providers, a Cox Communications official projected "a total windfall" for Turner but at increased costs. WTBS continued simulcasting TBS outside of separate Atlanta-based advertising, public affairs and E/I programming, but separated from TBS on October 1, 2007, when its call sign was changed to WPCH-TV and adopted a different program lineup.

== Canada ==
The emergence of superstations and pay television via satellite in the United States created a cross-border issue in Canada, where reception for home use in remote communities proliferated despite being illegal. When Canadian Radio-television and Telecommunications Commission (CRTC) chairman John Meisel threatened to prosecute people who owned an earth station, the British Columbian provincial government installed one of their own in defiance; British Columbia communications minister Pat McGeer considered the CRTC's demand "as bad as living behind the Iron Curtain". After seeking applications from Canadian common carriers to uplink Canadian signals, the CRTC awarded permits on April 14, 1981, to Canadian Satellite Communications (Cancom), the Inuit Tapirisat for Inuit-related programming, and the Dene for satellite radio. Cancom uplinked CHAN-TV (BCTV/CTV) in Vancouver, independent stations CITV-TV in Edmonton and CHCH-TV in Hamilton, Ontario, and several radio stations including the national CKO network. TCTV, a feed of CFTM-TV in Montreal with some alternate programming, was also uplinked. Cancom was authorized in 1984 to uplink WDIV-TV (NBC), WJBK-TV (CBS), WTVS (PBS) and WXYZ-TV (ABC), all in Detroit; in March 1987, United Video began marketing the Detroit uplinks to U.S. cable systems.

Some people say, 'But doesn't it shock you with all the murders and violence and stuff on their news?' and I say, 'Just because we live in the North in a small place doesn't mean we've never seen anything.' I mean, violence is all over the world, not just Detroit.

— Debbie Raddi, a resident of Tuktoyaktuk, on viewing television stations in Detroit via Cancom

By 1984, amid concerns satellite dishes and video tape recorders were driving television viewers away from Canadian content, the CRTC—now chaired by former Cancom head André Bureau—considered authorizing the Cancom stations to be available to cable systems across Canada. The proposal was seen as a needed financial boost to Cancom, who initially expected to break-even by 1989. The CBC, CTV, TVA and the Global Television Network urged a delay amid concerns these stations would engage in bidding wars for imported U.S. programs. The CRTC approved the proposal on March 22, 1985, with Bureau saying the move was necessary to help address the added influence of American superstations. By April 4, the CRTC authorized WTBS, WGN-TV, WPIX and WOR-TV for distribution on cable systems alongside BET and Satellite Program Network, a move meant to dissuade unlicensed satellite use. The Atlanta feed of WTBS was authorized for uplink instead of the superstation feed, thus, when WTBS separated from TBS in 2007, the CRTC re-authorized WPCH-TV for distribution instead. The Detroit network affiliates were also exclusively authorized for national distribution, resulting in cable subscribers in Winnipeg, Halifax, Nova Scotia, and Regina, Saskatchewan, to view only them instead of local over-the-air U.S. network affiliates.

After the Canadian government and the U.S. State Department agreed to a system for royalty fees, the FCC and CRTC jointly authorized WTBS and WGN-TV to be available on cable systems across Canada. WSBK-TV was awarded authorization to be uplinked on April 29, 1991, despite The Sports Network arguing WSBK's sports coverage would directly compete against them. KTLA was authorized on July 17, 1991, and KWGN was granted authorization on July 22, 1997. When WJBK switched affiliations to Fox in December 1994, Cancom replaced it with WTOL, the CBS affiliate in Toledo, Ohio. WJBK's removal came despite the CRTC allowing Fox stations to be imported on cable systems, as Fox was still deemed an "optional service" in larger markets. In smaller markets, WUHF in Rochester, New York, was uplinked for Fox programming. In 1998, WWJ-TV, which replaced WJBK as Detroit's CBS outlet, replaced WTOL on Cancom.

The CRTC authorizes five of the six designated American superstations for carriage on domestic multichannel television providers. Under CRTC rules first implemented on October 26, 1983, all authorized American superstations typically are received mainly through a subscription to one or more domestic premium channels; this was to help domestic programming services, particularly independently-owned and specialty services. Superstations included in Section "B" of the CRTC's Part II eligible services list are mandated to be packaged with premium services; however, under a related rule that allows for one superstation of the provider's choice to be carried on a non-premium tier, some television providers have chosen to offer either TBS/WPCH-TV, WGN-TV or WSBK in a specialty tier.
