= WRSB =

WRSB may refer to:

- WRSB (AM), a radio station (1600 AM) licensed to serve Brockport, New York, United States
- WOKR (AM), a radio station (1310 AM) licensed to serve Canandaigua, New York, which held the call sign WRSB from 1998 to 2017
- Wire rope safety barrier, a cable barrier
