= WASB =

WASB may refer to:

- WASB-LP, a low-power radio station (96.5 FM) licensed to serve Stanley-Boyd-Cadott, Wisconsin, United States
- WRSB (AM), a radio station (1590 AM) licensed to serve Brockport, New York, United States
- Women's Auxiliary Service (Burma)
