= Syndication exclusivity =

US television broadcast law

Syndication exclusivity (also known as syndex) is a federal law ( 47 U.S.C. § 76.103) implemented by the Federal Communications Commission (FCC) in the United States that is designed to protect a local television station's rights to syndicated television programs by granting exclusive broadcast rights to the station for that program in their local market, usually defined by a station's Nielsen Designated Market Area.

As a result, any airings of the same program on cable networks and, more commonly, superstations must be blocked by the local cable provider upon request from the local station. Broadcast television stations have the option of signing programming deals with or without syndex protection, but they stand to have audiences significantly diluted in markets without protection. Syndex protection is rarely enforced in regards to conventional cable networks, which (particularly since the late 1990s) often concurrently maintain rights to a particular program during the period of a broadcast syndication deal.

== History ==
The first syndex rule to be passed by the Federal Communications Commission went into effect on March 31, 1972. The regulations at the time were similar to those in the present-day law, except for the fact that they applied to almost all programming, including shows such as the Jerry Lewis MDA Telethon. WTCG in Atlanta, the original "superstation" (which at the time was distributed only in the Southeastern United States, five years before it became available nationally via satellite transmission), had programming blacked out in some areas where duplication existed.

In November 1976, the FCC began to consider making alterations to the syndex rulings. In April 1979, the FCC made a proposal to remove some of the rules. Further debate led the Cable Television Bureau of the FCC to recommend doing away with the rules entirely. On July 22, 1980, the Commission revoked the syndex rulings in a 4–3 vote, on the basis that "local stations are not adversely affected when a cable system offers subscribers signals from television stations in other cities." In 1980, the FCC lifted the old syndex law, as a way to bolster the growing cable television industry. This led cable systems to begin carrying other superstations and more regional out-of-market independent stations, at a time when the popularity of both was growing.

The current syndex law was tied in part to the Satellite Home Viewer Act of 1988. In the run-up to that legislation's passage on May 18, 1988, Tom Meek (general manager of WOFL in Orlando, Florida), with the assistance of Preston Padden of the Association of Independent Television Stations (INTV), presented a study utilizing custom Nielsen audience data showing significant ratings dilution in the 7:00–8:00 p.m. period that was directly attributable to the carriage of identical programming via Chicago superstation WGN-TV on numerous local cable providers, resulting in an estimated loss in advertising revenue of several hundred thousand dollars. The legislation, H.R. 2848, had been blocked by Democratic representative Mike Synar, whose district included Tulsa, Oklahoma, where WGN's satellite carrier United Video Satellite Group was headquartered. After the study was presented to and subsequently validated by Synar's staff, Synar dropped his opposition under pressure from committee chairman Washington Democratic Rep. Al Swift. H.R. 2848, sponsored by Texas Democratic Rep. John Bryant, then passed.

The syndex rules went back into effect on January 1, 1990. Before the reimposition of the syndex rules, stations like WGN and WTBS were paying local single market rates for programming acquisitions, even as they were gaining national coverage, and were selling that extended coverage to advertisers. After the syndex law was implemented, in at least some cases, the prices that superstations paid for program content had better reflected their actual national distribution, depending on arrangements with any given syndicator.

Since 1993, syndex is currently being used to block superstations offered through a programming tier provided by satellite provider Dish Network from being picked up in certain markets. In this case, the CW and MyNetworkTV affiliates in given markets can invoke the syndex law to keep the superstations that have the same network affiliations as the local station from coming into the market in any form. CW stations are using the law in order to block KTLA in Los Angeles, WPIX/New York City and KWGN-TV/Denver, while WWOR-TV in Secaucus, New Jersey, since 2015, are presently blocked in markets where MyNetworkTV affiliates are invoking the law.

=== Legal challenges ===
There have been a number of legal cases, most notably in Miami, and efforts in Washington, D.C. by terrestrial broadcasters to keep satellite providers from exploiting a provision in the law whereby satellite providers can offer programming where a broadcast station's signal is not available. In the Miami case, satellite providers were found to have allowed carriage of outside stations in households within a few miles of broadcast transmitters in violation of the law. Syndex is often unpopular with satellite subscribers and companies who would rather not afford local broadcast stations program rights protection.

== Notable examples ==
- Syndex also applies to programs seen on stations in Canada and Mexico – in the Buffalo, New York television market, when CTV owned-and-operated station CFTO-DT or Global owned-and-operated station CIII-DT airs a program that is also seen on an American broadcast network, the Canadian broadcast is blacked out, or replaced with the signal of the American station carrying the same program at that time (this does not apply to most sports on cable, especially if they are different productions from one another, unless the league for that sport requests a blackout; Buffalo Sabres games carried on CBC Television's Hockey Night in Canada and on MSG Network can be seen on both channels).
  - During an October 2008 dispute between LIN TV Corporation and Time Warner Cable, CBS programming (most notably NFL games, including those featuring the Buffalo Bills) were blacked out in the Buffalo market as a result of LIN and TWC's inability to come to terms on a new contract. Despite this, WIVB-TV (a CBS affiliate owned at the time by LIN, it is now owned by Nexstar Media Group) was still allowed to enforce syndex and prevent other CBS affiliates or CFTO from being brought into the market. CFTO was allowed to carry games in Niagara County, WSEE-TV (out of Erie, Pennsylvania) in Chautauqua County, WBNG (out of Binghamton) in Steuben County, and WROC-TV (out of Rochester) in Orleans, Genesee and Wyoming counties. Time Warner Cable customers in Erie, Cattaraugus and Allegany counties, whose only CBS affiliate is WIVB, were completely blacked out; in the latter two counties, because of terrestrial reception issues, antennas cannot be used, leaving satellite television (which still carried WIVB) as the only choice.
- A similar rule, simultaneous substitution, exists in Canada, allowing broadcasters to require that U.S. feeds of shows airing at exactly the same time on a Canadian network to be replaced with the Canadian feed. This is intended to protect domestic advertising revenue that would otherwise go to the U.S. network. The Canadian feed would stay on the original U.S. feed even after the Canadian broadcast ended until a user changed the channel.
- Sporting events that air on a national network such as ESPN are often blacked out in the markets of the teams that are playing, if a local station or regional sports network also has rights to the game. For example, a weeknight baseball game between the Cubs and Cardinals carried by ESPN would be blacked out in areas that receive either team's local broadcaster. The National Hockey League utilizes a similar policy for non-exclusive national games carried by NBCSN or NHL Network during the regular season and the first round of the playoffs. In another case, ESPN's ACC Wednesday games are blacked out in markets that receive coverage of Atlantic Coast Conference basketball on local stations via Raycom Sports. In such instances, ESPN would be temporary off-air, and replaced by a simulcast of another basic cable station, usually a news station like ESPNEWS, Fox News or MSNBC, but entertainment stations like TBS, TNT, FX, VH1, MTV or USA Network can also replace ESPN whenever a black out is enforced at the discretion of each cable service in the affected markets, as long as such stations aren't already blacked out. If not, a static or animated caption will air until the station resumes broadcasting in the market. ESPN's most recent contract extension with the league, which went into effect with the 2014 season, virtually eliminated local blackouts during the network's Monday and Wednesday night games, allowing ESPN coverage to co-exist in the home markets served by each team's local broadcaster.
- The National Football League utilizes a similar rule for nationally televised games carried exclusively by cable networks (such as ESPN and NFL Network) as well as digital subscription streaming services such as Amazon Prime Video, ESPN+, and Peacock. NFL policies require all games to be available on broadcast television in the primary markets of the teams involved, so primary broadcast rights in those local markets are syndicated to local stations in the affected markets, and the telecast on the respective cable network is blacked out to protect the local broadcaster that has syndication rights to these games.

== Some effects ==
Throughout the 1970s and 1980s, several independent local stations were uplinked via satellite so that they could be available either nationally or regionally, especially to markets that did not have independent stations, either because the market could not support one due to having lower population densities or because one simply did not exist. Three of those stations, WOR-TV in New York City (later moved to Secaucus, New Jersey and renamed to WWOR), WGN-TV in Chicago and WTCG/WTBS in Atlanta, were available nationally. WTBS aired shows that were generally "syndex proof" (or, in simpler terms, having "full signal rights") due to program contracts that the station was able to negotiate so that it could avoid having any programs blacked out or substituted, save for sports programs.

In 1990, when the syndex law was passed, national versions of WWOR-TV and WGN-TV, which aired different programs from the local signals in their native cities, were launched. These feeds replaced programs that had syndication exclusivity claims in certain markets with syndicated programs to which no station held exclusive rights in any market. WWOR's national feed outside of New York City was branded as the "WWOR EMI Service" (the "EMI" referring to Eastern Microwave, Inc., the superstation feed's satellite uplinker). WGN-TV did not have to cover up as many programs as WWOR, and while WGN was able to carry programming from The WB network on its national feed from January 1995 (when its Chicago parent station also affiliated with the network) to October 1999, WWOR was not permitted by UPN to carry that network's programming on the EMI feed. This negatively affected UPN as WGN's carriage of The WB temporarily filled holes where that network did not have a full-time or secondary carrier in some markets until the network found local over-the-air affiliates and later set up a cable-only feed in 1998. UPN's decision to deny WWOR permission to carry its programming nationally left open gaps in market coverage for that network in several large and mid-sized cities.

After the national version of WWOR ceased uplinking in January 1997 (after Advance Entertainment Corporation sold WWOR's satellite transponder slot to Discovery Communications to expand national coverage of Animal Planet), the New York City-area feed, which included UPN programs and other shows previously covered up on the EMI feed, was uplinked by the National Programming Service for exclusive distribution to satellite providers. That feed was discontinued in 1999 with its transponder space being turned over to Pax TV, though Dish Network now carries the New York City feed of WWOR. WTBS was separated from the national feed of TBS in October 2007, and now airs only Atlanta-cleared programming as WPCH (the Atlanta station remains a superstation in Canada, although some of its programming is instead substituted with a domestic network feed of the same program under simultaneous substitution regulations). WGN's national superstation feed, later branded as "WGN Superstation" and "Superstation WGN", would be renamed WGN America in 2007; by this point, the number of syndicated programs that WGN-TV both gained full signal rights to and aired on both the Chicago broadcast signal and the national feed had substantially decreased, with WGN America mirroring the former WWOR EMI Service in its scheduling. WGN's national feed was also separated from its parent station, except in name, and converted into a basic cable network on December 16, 2014, and, as a result, no longer carries any Chicago-area programming.

== Syndex-free/full signal rights ==
In any case, national superstations such as WGN were, in later years, still sometimes able to negotiate full signal rights for a syndicated program. Whether or not a particular program could be cleared for full signal rights depends on how it was originally sold to other television stations nationwide. For example, the repackaged American Idol Rewind was allowed to air on WGN's national "Superstation" signal by virtue of Tribune Entertainment (the now-defunct production and distribution unit of the station's owner, the Tribune Company) being a majority partner as well as the distributor of the program.

Other studios can also allow full signal rights to superstations for its programming. For example, 20th Television allowed WGN full signal rights to the syndicated version of 24 as did NBCUniversal Television Distribution with 30 Rock, and Sony Pictures Television used the same method for Seinfeld for TBS.

However, once one superstation's term of license on a program ends, it can enter into syndex restrictions. For example, for decades TBS had full signal rights to The Andy Griffith Show until Viacom's cable networks were able to negotiate new full signal rights in the mid-1990s (The Andy Griffith Show at the time was distributed by Viacom, then its successor, Paramount Television). Today, TV Land has national rights to The Andy Griffith Show (now distributed through CBS Television Distribution), and under this new contract cannot be seen on any other national network or superstation, but it can still be seen on local over-the-air stations, as stations such as WRAL-TV/WRAZ in Raleigh and WVTV in Milwaukee have done for decades (similarly, the broadcast rights to the program held by some local stations have prevented Me-TV from carrying Andy Griffith on many of its affiliates since it began carrying the sitcom in 2014). Broadcasts on these local stations are only restricted to their particular markets.

== See also ==
- Simultaneous substitution – Canadian technique of placing a Canadian signal over the American signal on cable and satellite
- Blackout (broadcasting) – for blackouts of sporting events
