= Mike Catalana =

Mike Catalana is an American NFL announcer. He is currently the Sports Director of WHAM-TV, the ABC affiliate in Rochester, New York. His professional career began in 1986 when he became the Sports Director at WMGC-TV, the ABC affiliate in Binghamton, New York. He came to WOKR (now WHAM) in Rochester as the weekend sports anchor and reporter in December 1987. After 16 months, he was named the station's Sports Director in December 1989.

Mike Catalana served as the sideline reporter for the Buffalo Bills Television network on MSG Western New York during the NFL pre-season from 2000 to 2017; he lost that position after MSG signed a syndication deal with Nexstar Media Group (owners of rival station WROC-TV) in 2018. He lost his remaining positions with MSG when the company hired Maddy Glab to fill his remaining posts there in 2019. Catalana is the pre-game and between period host of Amerks Hockey games on MSG. Mike also anchors a daily sports report for “The 5 O’clock News Hour” on WHAM radio in Rochester.

Catalana attended St. Augustine College Preparatory School in Richland, New Jersey and graduated in 1985 with a bachelor's degree from Ithaca College where he studied media.
