= WACZ =

WACZ may refer to:

- WZON, a radio station (620 AM) licensed to Bangor, Maine, which held the call sign WACZ from 1981 to 1983
- WDXT, a radio station (93.9 FM) licensed to Dansville, New York, which held the call sign WACZ from 1990 to 1992
- WACZ format, a compressed ZIP-based file format for storing Web archive data as WARC files along with indexing metadata
