= WWOR EMI Service =

American television channel

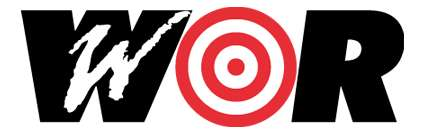
- Logo used to represent the superstation feed. The object used to represent the "O" varied in some versions.
- Type: Superstation for cable television systems
- Country: United States

Ownership
- Owner: Eastern Microwave, Inc.

History
- Launched: January 1, 1990
- Closed: December 31, 1996
- Replaced by: Animal Planet

WWOR EMI Service was a New York City–based American cable television channel that broadcast from January 1, 1990, to December 31, 1996. It was the superstation feed of Secaucus, New Jersey–licensed WWOR-TV (channel 9), offered to cable systems outside the New York City market. It consisted of WWOR's local programming—such as New York Mets baseball games and local newscasts—and alternate programming for those shows on the WWOR schedule to which local TV stations in other markets could claim syndication exclusivity. The service was uplinked to satellite from Syracuse, New York, by Eastern Microwave, Inc., a subsidiary of Advance Publications, which changed its name to Advance Entertainment Corporation in September 1996.

== History ==
Eastern Microwave, Inc. (EMI) of Syracuse, New York, was founded in 1961 to import three distant signals from New York City—WPIX, WOR-TV and WNEW-TV, all independent stations—to cable systems in Upstate New York through microwave relay. Newhouse Broadcasting, the broadcasting unit of newspaper chain Advance Publications, purchased EMI in 1965. When the Federal Communications Commission (FCC) instituted an "open entry" policy allowing common satellite carriers the ability to uplink television stations to satellite for cable systems nationwide, EMI applied to uplink both WOR-TV and WSBK-TV in Boston. EMI was granted authorization for both in March 1979 and uplinked WOR-TV on April 18, 1979. It was the fourth superstation to be uplinked. WSBK, along with KTLA in Los Angeles, were also uplinked by EMI in 1988. WOR-TV was renamed WWOR-TV in 1987.

In 1988, the FCC re-enacted syndication exclusivity (syndex) rules. Under these rules, whenever a local broadcast television station had the exclusive rights to broadcast a syndicated program, that particular program must be blacked out on any out-of-market stations that were carried by local cable providers. After the law was passed, EMI announced it would purchase programs to replace those on WWOR-TV that would be unavailable outside of the New York City market due to syndex. EMI estimated 15 to 20 hours a week of preemptions related to syndex. When syndex began on January 1, 1990, the WWOR EMI Service replaced the direct WWOR-TV feed as EMI's offering. Fifteen programs on the WWOR-TV lineup, ranging from The Jetsons to Remington Steele, were not cleared for syndex. This contrasted with WGN-TV in Chicago and WTBS in Atlanta, both of which sought to license as much programming as possible for national coverage on their superstation feeds.

Among the programs offered by the EMI Service as replacements were shows from WWOR-TV's owner, MCA Inc., including It Takes a Thief, Run for Your Life, and The Jack Benny Show; along with shows from the Christian Science Monitor's television service. WWOR-TV lost 500,000 subscribers, many to new carriage of TNT, but gained one million others, including some systems that dropped WSBK-TV for the WWOR EMI Service. By 1991, EMI Service substitutions accounted for roughly seven hours a day of programming. When WWOR-TV affiliated with UPN in January 1995, the network restricted the EMI Service from carrying its programming. By 1996, the remaining WWOR-TV simulcasts on the EMI Service were limited to its 10 p.m. newscast and New York Mets games.

EMI changed its name to Advance Entertainment Corporation (AEC) in September 1996. On December 31, 1996, AEC discontinued the feed, citing a declining interest by cable operators, including Tele-Communications Inc., which ended its carriage of many superstations nationwide in favor of new cable services that were offering up-front fees for carriage. At the time, the WWOR EMI Service reached 12.5 million households. The Mets were slated to have 52 games telecast on WWOR for the upcoming season, down from 72 in 1996, which would have added to the amount of replacement programming AEC needed to acquire. Advance sold the satellite transponder to Discovery Communications for the then-new Animal Planet. News of the closure came with one weeks' notice and caught cable systems off guard, many of which were pressed to find replacement channels.
