= WDNY (AM) =

- Dansville, New York; United States
- Frequency: 1400 kHz
- Branding: 105.7 WDNY

Programming
- Format: Adult contemporary
- Affiliations: Compass Media Networks; Premiere Networks; Westwood One

Ownership
- Owner: Genesee Media Corporation, Inc.
- Sister stations: WDXT; WRSB; WOKR; WYLF

History
- First air date: 1978 (at 1600)
- Former frequencies: 1600 kHz (1978-?)

Technical information
- Licensing authority: FCC
- Facility ID: 15369
- Class: C
- Power: 880 watts day; 1,000 watts night
- Transmitter coordinates: 42°32′33.8″N 77°41′03.4″W
- Translator: 105.7 W289CX (Dansville)

Links
- Public license information: Public file; LMS
- Webcast: Listen live
- Website: wdnyradio.com

WDNY (1400 kHz) is an AM radio station broadcasting a classic hits (leaning toward gold-based adult contemporary music) format. WDNY signed on the air in 1978 on October 20 at 1600 kHz. As an AM daytime-only radio station, WDNY applied for the 1400 frequency and moved there shortly thereafter. Licensed to Dansville, Livingston County, New York, United States, the station is owned by Genesee Media Corporation.
