= Animal Planet =

American pay television channel

- Logo used since 2018
- Country: United States
- Broadcast area: United States; Europe; Australia; Southeast Asia; Middle East; Africa; Russia; New Zealand; South Asia
- Headquarters: 230 Park Avenue South; New York City, U.S.

Programming
- Language: English
- Picture format: 1080i HDTV

Ownership
- Owner: Skydance Corporation
- Parent: Skydance Global Cable Media
- Sister channels: list of assets owned by Skydance

History
- Launched: June 1, 1996; 30 years ago

Links
- Website: animalplanet.com

Availability

Streaming media
- Affiliated Streaming Service(s): HBO Max and Discovery+
- Service(s): DirecTV Stream, Hulu + Live TV, Philo, YouTube TV

Animal Planet (stylized in all lowercase since 2018) is an American multinational pay television channel owned by Skydance Corporation. First established on June 1, 1996, the channel is primarily devoted to series and documentaries about wild animals and domestic pets.

The channel was originally a joint venture with BBC Worldwide, and primarily focused on nature documentaries surrounding wildlife, targeting a family audience. In 2008, Animal Planet rebranded with a more action-focused programming direction, with a greater emphasis on aggressive and predatory portrayals of animals, as well as an increase in reality series following personalities involved in animal-related occupations and investigations. Animal Planet rebranded again in October 2018, pivoting away from its more aggressive branding.

As of November 2023, Animal Planet is available to approximately 70,000,000 pay television households in the United States-down from its 2011 peak of 98,000,000 households. Discovery has also established or licensed international versions of the channel in various regions.

== History ==
Animal Planet was launched on June 1, 1996; it was created by Discovery Communications in cooperation with BBC Worldwide. On January 1, 1997, Animal Planet's distribution grew as a result of Advance Entertainment Corporation selling the satellite transponder slot belonging to the WWOR EMI Service (a national superstation feed of Secaucus, New Jersey/New York City's WWOR-TV, that was implemented following the 1989 passage of the Syndication Exclusivity Rights Rule by the Federal Communications Commission) to Discovery Communications, replacing the feed with Animal Planet outright.

In late 2005, as part of a multi-million dollar expansion, the National Aquarium in Baltimore opened an exhibit called "Animal Planet Australia: Wild Extreme". Animal Planet and the National Aquarium in Baltimore announced a multi-year partnership the year prior, which produced an original orientation film that gives Aquarium visitors background on the Australian area which inspired the new exhibit and a dedicated area inside the expansion where visitors can learn about Animal Planet's conservation efforts and other programming. The partnership also allowed the possibility of future productions of television programs about the National Aquarium in Baltimore's research and exhibits.

In 2006, BBC Worldwide sold its 20% interest in the flagship Animal Planet US network back to Discovery Communications. The BBC maintained its 50% ownership in Animal Planet's European, Asian and Latin American channels, as well as a minority interest in Animal Planet Japan and Animal Planet Canada until November 15, 2010, when BBC Worldwide sold 50% interest in Animal Planet and Liv to Discovery Communications for $156 million. Animal Planet is additionally an associate member of the Caribbean Cable Cooperative.

During the late 2000s, Genius Products announced a US distribution agreement involving Animal Planet and TLC. Jakks Pacific also entered into a licensing agreement to develop Animal Planet–branded pet products.

=== 2008 rebranding ===
Animal Planet logo used from February 3, 2008 to October 14, 2018

On February 3, 2008, amidst declining average viewership, Animal Planet underwent a major revamp in its programming and branding. The new lineup placed a larger focus on series portraying animals as "characters" in their own right, and more "aggressive" and story-based entertainment series targeting older viewers 13-49 (such as Escape to Chimp Eden and the reality documentary series Whale Wars), as opposed to traditional nature documentaries and family/all-ages viewing. The network also adopted a new logo, replacing its previous "elephant and globe" emblem with a stylized wordmark, and the new slogan "Same Planet, Different World". Network president Marjorie Kaplan explained that Animal Planet had been too "soft" and "all-family"-focused and that it was aiming to be "more aggressive and tapping into the instinctual nature of compelling animal content".

In April 2010, Animal Planet introduced a new slogan and marketing campaign, "Surprisingly Human", as an evolution of the 2008 rebranding. The slogan reflected Animal Planet's increasing number of personality-based series following animal-related investigations and occupations, such as River Monsters.

In April 2012, Animal Planet's entertainment-oriented direction was criticized after it broadcast Mermaids: The Body Found—a fictional documentary suggesting that mermaids were real. Despite its fictitious content, the documentary was widely viewed, and a follow-up entitled Mermaids: The New Evidence set an all-time ratings record for the channel.

=== 2018 rebranding ===
On October 15, 2018, Animal Planet unveiled a new logo, featuring a symbol of a jumping elephant resembling the original logo. The new branding symbolizes a new mission of "keeping the childhood joy and wonder of animals alive by bringing people up close in every way". The new branding coincided with the October 28 premieres of Crikey! It's the Irwins and Amanda to the Rescue, and the premiere of Big Cat Stories the following night.

On January 23, 2019, Animal Planet was launched in France, along with Discovery Turbo, Discovery World, and TLC.

== Programming ==
Additions to the channel in the late 2000s, such as Meerkat Manor and Orangutan Island, reflected its shift toward "predation programming" and more immersive storytelling. Animal Planet intended the new direction to help revitalize stagnating ratings after primetime viewership of the network dropped by 9% in 2007. Animal Planet added pseudo-scientific documentary, reality television, and sitcom shows to its lineup.

Animal Planet is also well known for the Puppy Bowl, an annual special featuring puppies at play inside a football-themed setting. The special airs on the afternoon prior to the NFL's Super Bowl and was originally narrated by commentator and NFL Films narrator Harry Kalas before his death.

On October 29, 2022, months after the Merger of Discovery, Inc. and WarnerMedia into Warner Bros. Discovery, it was announced that Pit Bulls & Parolees would air its final season, while other shows like Lone Star Law and Louisiana Law moved to Discovery Channel. With the exception of Puppy Bowl XIX that aired on the network February 12, 2023, the latest programming moves left Animal Planet to air reruns of the network's programming as well as other shows from other Discovery properties pre-WBD merger.

== Animal Planet Magazine ==
D.C. Thomson & Co. partnered with Discovery to publish Animal Planet Magazine in the United Kingdom. The magazine's first issue was published on February 16, 2011.

== See also ==
- Animal Planet (UK & Ireland)
- Animal Planet (Canada)
- Animal Planet Nordic
- Animal Planet (Australia and New Zealand)
- Animal Planet (Germany)
- Animal Planet Europe
- Animal Planet (Poland)
- Animal Planet (India)
- Animal Planet (Asia)
- List of programs broadcast by Animal Planet
