= Don Alhart =

American television news anchor

- Born: May 15, 1944 (age 82); Rochester, New York, US
- Education: Ithaca College
- Occupation: Television news anchor
- Years active: 1966–2024
- Notable credit: NewsSource 13, 13 WHAM News
- Spouse: Mary
- Children: Todd, Jennifer, Jon

Don Alhart (born May 15, 1944) is a former American television journalist who served the main news anchor and Associate News Director for WHAM-TV (Channel 13, ABC Affiliate) in Rochester, New York. Alhart began his professional television career at WOKR-TV (the predecessor of WHAM) in 1966 after graduating from Ithaca College.

He has won the Edward R. Murrow Award five times for Best Newscast in the nation. He has also received the 60th Annual Rochester Rotary Award, the oldest major civic award in Rochester's community, presented each year to a citizen who has made a significant contribution to the business, professional, cultural, or civic life of the community. In 2010, he was elected to the New York State Broadcasters Association Hall of Fame.

He has been an active member of the Rochester Rotary Club for the past 33 years, serving as president in 1987 and Governor for Rotary District 7120, which includes Brockport, for 2002–2003. Don is involved in numerous charitable organizations throughout the Rochester area.

Don celebrated 50 years at Channel 13 in June 2016. He said he planned to work “another few years," with no immediate plans to retire. Set the Guinness World Record for Longest Career as a Television News Broadcaster (50 years and 179 days), which was verified on December 2, 2016.

Don retired on June 6, 2024, exactly 58 years after his first day working at WOKR, three weeks after turning 80 years old.
