= WYLF =

- Penn Yan, New York; United States
- Broadcast area: Finger Lakes Region, Rochester metropolitan area
- Frequency: 850 kHz
- Branding: Fresh Lake Air WYLF 850 AM - 93.9 FM

Programming
- Format: Soft adult contemporary
- Affiliations: Local Radio Networks; ABC News Radio

Ownership
- Owner: Brian Patrick McGlynn; (WYLF Radio LLC)
- Sister stations: WDNY; WDXT; WRSB; WOKR

History
- First air date: 1982
- Former call signs: WOZO (1981–1984); WQKA (1984–1988)
- Call sign meaning: "Your Lifetime Favorites" (previous slogan)

Technical information
- Licensing authority: FCC
- Facility ID: 39466
- Class: D
- Power: 1,000 watts day; 45 watts night
- Transmitter coordinates: 42°39′41.25″N 77°7′12.9″W
- Translator: 93.9 W230CZ (Penn Yan)

Links
- Public license information: Public file; LMS
- Webcast: Listen live
- Website: wylf.com

WYLF (850 kHz) is a commercial AM radio station in Penn Yan, New York, serving the Finger Lakes region of New York and the Rochester metropolitan area. The station airs a soft adult contemporary fed by Local Radio Networks, and airs the syndicated Intelligence For Your Life with John Tesh program at night. The station also features news updates from ABC News Radio.

The station is owned by Brian McGlynn's Genesee Media Corporation, through licensee WYLF Radio LLC.

== Transmitter ==
By day, WYLF is powered at 1,000 watts. Because AM 850 is a clear channel frequency, the station must reduce power at night to 45 watts to avoid interfering with longer-established stations. It uses a non-directional antenna at all times. The transmitter is located on East Sherman Road (Route 22) at Sutton Road in Penn Yan. WYLF is also heard on FM translator W230CZ at 93.9 MHz in Penn Yan.

== History ==
The station got its Federal Communications Commission (FCC) construction permit on September 14, 1981, and was assigned the call sign WOZO on November 25. The station took several months to build and signed on the air in 1982. It was owned by MB Communications. At first it was a daytimer, required to go off the air at sunset. It transmitted with 500 watts and aired a middle of the road music format.

WOZO changed its call sign to WQKA on July 23, 1984. It became WYLF on October 1, 1988. In the 1990s, the power was boosted to 1,000 watts; the FCC also granted WYLF nighttime authorization to broadcast after sunset at 47 watts.

For a time, WYLF carried an oldies and adult standards format via Citadel Media's "Timeless", a syndicated satellite feed. When Timeless was discontinued, WYLF began providing local content from its own music library. It later joined the "America's Best Music" network from Westwood One.

On April 29, 2022, Tim Stratton sold the station and its FM translator to Brian McGlynn's Genesee Media Corporation for $260,000, pending FCC approval. In early May 2022, Genesee Media began operating the station and flipped it to soft adult contemporary as "Fresh Lake Air WYLF". The sale was consummated on March 9, 2023.

== Translator ==
Call sign	Frequency	City of license	FID	ERP (W)	Class	Transmitter coordinates	FCC info
W230CZ	93.9 FM	Penn Yan, New York	200771	250	D	42°39′42.2″N 77°7′9.8″W	LMS
