= Primetime 24 =

Primetime 24 (PT24) was a special package offered on C band satellite sent out to viewers who mainly live in remote and distant locations. The package consisted of local ABC, CBS, NBC and Fox affiliates on the East Coast. The service was broadcast via the AMC-3 satellite, encrypted using DigiCipher 2. Until 2012, the service was owned by Lorac Communications, based in Collingwood, Ontario, Canada.

== History ==
When Primetime 24 first started in 1992, the group originally consisted of:

- WABC-TV, New York City (ABC)
- WBBM-TV, Chicago (CBS)
- WXIA-TV, Atlanta (NBC)
- WFLD, Chicago (Fox)

In 1994, however, the two Chicago stations were replaced with WRAL-TV from Raleigh, North Carolina, for CBS and WSVN from Miami for Fox; by 1997, PT24 dropped Fox, and WRAL, due to many pre-emptions of CBS programming, was replaced with WSEE-TV from Erie, Pennsylvania, which was PT24's CBS affiliate for the remainder of the package's existence. WABC and WXIA still remained the ABC and NBC (respectively) affiliates for PT24 through 2008; however, for a time, WABC was replaced with WJLA-TV of Washington, D.C. and later WKRN-TV of Nashville, Tennessee; WXIA was replaced with WNBC of New York City, and later was replaced by WTVJ in Miami. WABC was dropped in favor of WPLG on January 1, 2009, and Fox was restored by adding WUTV of Buffalo, New York.

== Other time zones ==
At one point, PT24 offered a package called "The Denver 5", featuring that city's KMGH-TV (ABC), KCNC-TV (CBS), KUSA (NBC), KDVR (Fox), and KRMA (PBS), with KWGN-TV eventually added to provide a complementary independent/WB offering to its Chicago sister station, WGN-TV.

Stations on the West Coast were also included in the late 1990s and early 2000s, featuring Seattle, Washington's KOMO-TV (ABC), San Francisco's KPIX-TV (CBS), and Los Angeles' KNBC (NBC).

== Similar packages ==
- Netlink offered a network package called "A3" for a time that included WPLG (ABC), WUSA-TV in Washington (CBS), and WBZ-TV in Boston for NBC (later replaced with WHDH-TV, following the 1995 affiliation change).
- Before PT24 began, a package called "Atlantic Coast" was used, which included WPLG, WUSA and WBZ-TV, plus WTXF-TV from Philadelphia for Fox.
- In the early days of direct broadcast satellite, many companies offered local channels on a nationwide basis, subject to FCC restrictions: PrimeStar offered WSB-TV from Atlanta for ABC, plus WUSA, WHDH, WTXF and a national PBS service. West Coast channels included KABC-TV from Los Angeles for ABC, KOIN from Portland, Oregon, for CBS, KCRA-TV from Sacramento for NBC, and KTVU from San Francisco for Fox. DirecTV offered WRAL-TV and KPIX-TV for CBS, WNBC and KNBC for NBC, KOMO-TV and WJLA-TV for ABC, and WNET (New York) for PBS.
- In the US, Dish Network and DirecTV still offer local channels nationally as well, where local service is not available terrestrially or on satellite. In Canada, Bell Satellite TV and Shaw Direct offer US networks on their services, as do most cable systems, though American commercial stations are subject to simultaneous substitution regulations.
