= WDXT =

- Dansville, New York; United States
- Frequency: 93.9 MHz
- Branding: Classic Rock 93.9

Programming
- Format: Classic rock

Ownership
- Owner: Genesee Media Corporation, Inc.
- Sister stations: WDNY; WOKR; WRSB; WYLF

History
- First air date: 1990 (as WACZ)
- Former call signs: WACZ (1989–1992); WDNY-FM (1992–2013); WMRV (2013–2017); WDNY-FM (2017–2025)

Technical information
- Licensing authority: FCC
- Facility ID: 15370
- Class: A
- ERP: 570 watts
- HAAT: 226 meters (741 ft)
- Transmitter coordinates: 42°30′45.2″N 77°38′5.9″W

Links
- Public license information: Public file; LMS
- Webcast: Listen live
- Website: classicrock939.com

WDXT (93.9 FM) is a radio station broadcasting a classic rock format in Dansville, Livingston County, New York, United States. The station is owned by Genesee Media.

The station is located such that the broadcast at times reaches as far north as Pittsford, New York, to the Pennsylvania border to the south.

== History ==
In 2003, WDNY-FM moved from its original location at 129 Main Street to a new office and studio at 195 Main Street. The new location is within a historic Main Street building and still contains the original ornate tin ceiling. On October 28, 2011, WDNY-FM changed hands from Miller Media Inc. to Genesee Media Corporation.

The station is well known for its local service to the Genesee Valley, Western Finger Lakes, and Southern Tier areas of New York State.

WDNY-FM's Five-County News was broadcast live in the mornings with News Director Terry Van until his retirement on December 24, 2010.

On March 25, 2013, WDNY-FM changed its call letters to WMRV.

On February 22, 2017, WMRV changed its call letters back to WDNY-FM.

On December 18, 2017, WDNY-FM changed its format from adult to classic rock, branded as "Classic Rock 93.9". On January 28, 2018, it began airing the syndicated Pink Floyd program Floydian Slip.

On March 11, 2019, Hold Fast Media, Inc. owned by Don MacLeod took over the operations of WDNY and WDNY-FM. On July 27, 2020, Hold Fast Media, Inc. returned the station to Genesee Media Corporation.

On May 5, 2025, WDNY-FM changed its call letters to WDXT to avoid confusion with WDNY, which has its own FM translator at 105.7.
