= WROC-TV =

Television station in Rochester, New York

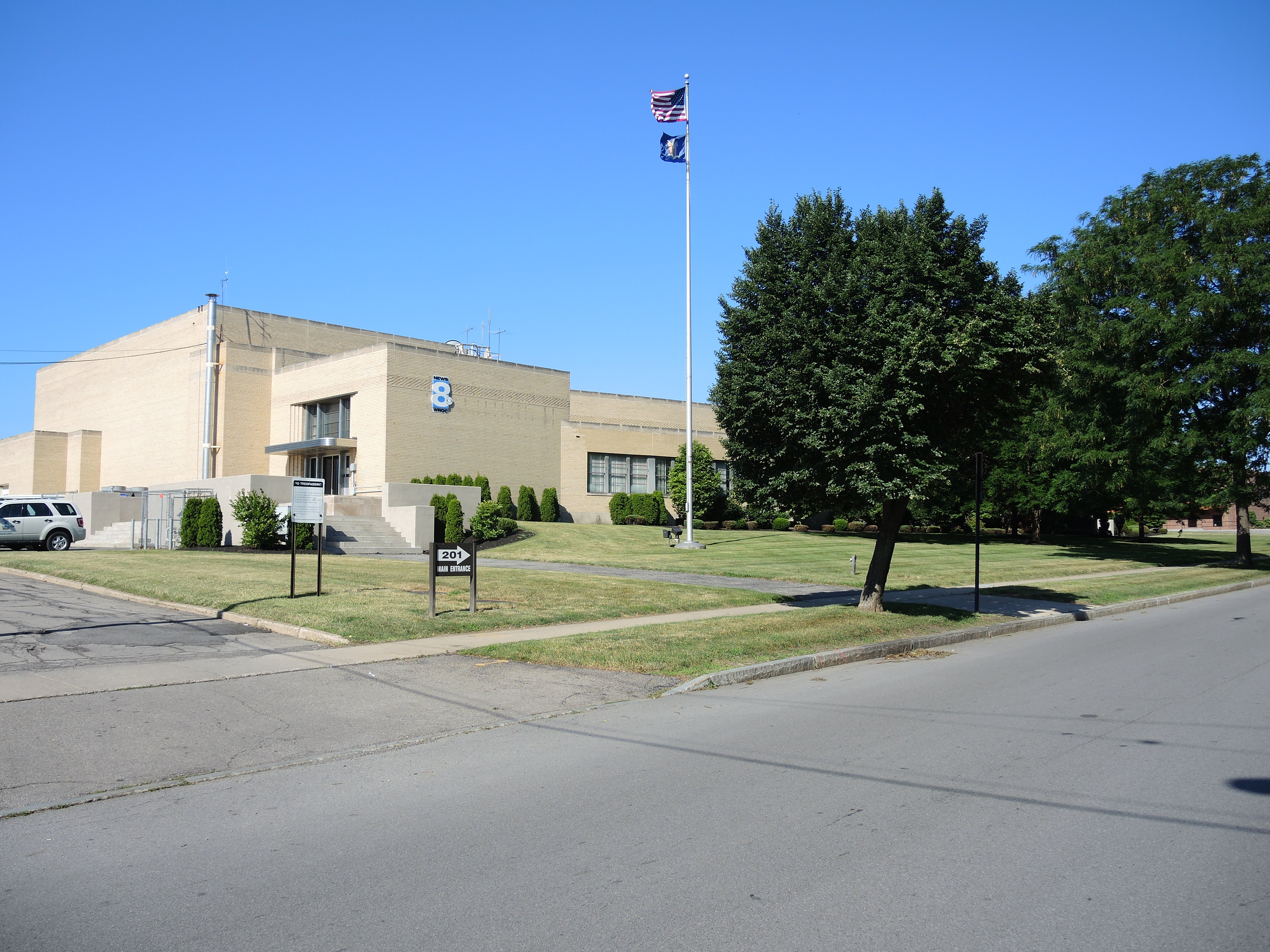
- Headquarters on Humboldt Street in Rochester, New York
- Rochester, New York; United States
- Channels: Digital: 21 (UHF); Virtual: 8
- Branding: News 8

Programming
- Affiliations: 8.1: CBS; for others, see § Subchannels

Ownership
- Owner: Nexstar Media Group; (Nexstar Media Inc.)

History
- First air date: June 11, 1949
- Former call signs: WHTM (CP, 1948–1949); WHAM-TV (1949–1956)
- Former channel numbers: Analog: 6 (VHF, 1949–1954), 5 (VHF, 1954–1962), 8 (VHF, 1962–2009); Digital: 45 (UHF, 2007–2019)
- Former affiliations: NBC (1949–1989); DuMont (secondary, 1949–1956)
- Call sign meaning: "Rochester", also an airport code

Technical information
- Licensing authority: FCC
- Facility ID: 73964
- ERP: 1,000 kW
- HAAT: 123.2 m (404 ft)
- Transmitter coordinates: 43°8′8.3″N 77°35′1.3″W

Links
- Public license information: Public file; LMS
- Website: www.rochesterfirst.com

WROC-TV (channel 8) is a television station in Rochester, New York, United States, affiliated with CBS and owned by Nexstar Media Group. The station's studios are located on Humboldt Street in downtown Rochester, and its transmitter is located on Pinnacle Hill in Brighton, New York.

Prior to 2021, the WROC studios hosted the master control operations of Nexstar's "virtual triopoly" in the Quad Cities television market of southeastern Iowa and west-central Illinois, which includes fellow CBS affiliate WHBF-TV, CW owned-and-operated station KGCW, and Fox-affiliated LMA partner KLJB.

== History ==
WROC-TV is Rochester's oldest television station, signing on June 11, 1949, as WHAM-TV, an NBC affiliate on channel 6. It was owned originally by Stromberg-Carlson, a telephone equipment manufacturer, along with WHAM (1180 AM) and WHFM (98.9 FM, now WBZA). The station was also affiliated with the now-defunct DuMont Television Network.

WHAM-TV moved to channel 5 on July 24, 1954, as part of a revision of upstate New York's VHF allotments resulting from the Federal Communications Commission (FCC)'s Sixth Report and Order of 1952. However, WHAM-TV on channel 5 dealt with interference issues from CBLT, a CBC Television station from Toronto, after that station moved from its original channel 9 allocation to channel 6 in 1956. CBLT was replaced on channel 9 by CFTO-TV in 1960, and that channel relocation would later play an indirect role in the station's second frequency shift, eight years later.

Stromberg-Carlson merged with General Dynamics in 1955. General Dynamics was not interested in owning broadcast outlets, and put the WHAM radio and television outlets on the market. In 1956, WHAM-TV was sold to Transcontinent Broadcasting, which owned WGR radio and WGR-TV in Buffalo; the new owners changed the call sign to the current WROC-TV. In 1961, Transcontinent sold the station to Veterans Broadcasting Company, which subsequently sold its half of what is today WHEC-TV (channel 10) to the Gannett Company, then based in Rochester. The acquisition by Veterans Broadcasting also gave WROC-TV new sister stations on radio, as WVET-AM-FM (1280 AM and 97.9 FM) changed their call signs to WROC (AM) and WROC-FM. (The WHAM-TV call sign is now used on Rochester's ABC affiliate, channel 13, previously known as WOKR. Other than the shared call sign, that station is unrelated to the earlier WHAM-TV.)

Under Veterans' ownership, WROC-TV moved to channel 8 at 6 a.m. on September 9, 1962, as part of another channel allocation change, this one being a switch involving Rochester and Syracuse. The FCC moved WROC-TV's former channel 5 east to Syracuse, and it was taken by Meredith Corporation-owned WHEN-TV (now WTVH), which was previously on channel 8. The move also allowed a new station on channel 9 to enter the Syracuse market; it signed on as WNYS-TV (later WIXT-TV and now WSYR-TV) the same day.

Veterans Broadcasting was merged into Rust Craft Broadcasting in February 1965. Rust Craft sold its television unit to Ziff Davis in 1979. This resulted in the breakup of the WROC stations, as WROC (AM) and WPXY (the former WROC-FM) were later sold by Rust-Craft to members of the firm's broadcast management team. Within a few years, however, Ziff Davis broke up its television group; WROC-TV and sister stations WEYI-TV in Saginaw, Michigan, WRDW-TV in Augusta, Georgia, and WTOV-TV in Steubenville, Ohio, were spun-off to Television Station Partners LP, a group composed of Ziff Davis's broadcast executives, in 1983. Television Station Partners sold channel 8, along with the Saginaw and Steubenville outlets, to Smith Broadcasting in 1996. Smith Broadcasting announced in 1999 that it would be selling WROC-TV to Nexstar Broadcasting Group, making WROC-TV one of Nexstar's oldest stations.

It was while under the stewardship of Television Station Partners that WROC-TV made another switch: In April 1989, NBC announced it would end its 40-year partnership with channel 8 and move its Rochester affiliation to then-CBS station WHEC-TV. This move was the result of WROC-TV's poor performance and constant preemptions of NBC network programming (NBC was very intolerant of preemptions at this time, and was the number one network at the time, adding to NBC's frustration with channel 8). WROC-TV agreed to terms to affiliate with CBS in May, and channel 8 soon began airing CBS' Saturday morning children's programs (with the notable exception of Pee-wee's Playhouse) and daytime game shows Family Feud and Now You See It, all of which had been preempted by WHEC-TV. Channel 8 began airing the full CBS schedule on August 13, 1989.

For many years, WROC-TV was one of three Rochester area stations offered on cable in the Ottawa–Gatineau and Eastern Ontario regions. The Rochester area stations were replaced with Detroit stations when the microwave relay system that provided these signals was discontinued. Until January 2009, WROC-TV was also available in many Central Ontario communities such as Belleville, Cobourg, and Lindsay.

On July 9, 2012, WROC-TV replaced Louisville's WLKY on Time Warner Cable systems in that station's region, when WLKY's owners, Hearst Television, pulled its stations off Time Warner Cable's systems in a retransmission dispute. However, Nexstar complained that Time Warner Cable has used their signals outside their markets without permission, while Time Warner Cable was within its rights to use their signals as replacements until a deal with Hearst is reached. WROC-TV, for its part, made the best of its predicament, naming the administrator of a Facebook group of tongue-in-cheek Louisvillean WROC-TV fans its fan of the week and making a handful of other shout-outs to its emerging Louisville fanbase. The substitution of WROC-TV in place of WLKY lasted until July 19, 2012, when a deal was reached between Hearst and Time Warner.

== News operation ==
In August 1957, WROC-TV began airing the area's first 11 p.m. broadcast called Eleventh Hour News. Regular sports segments were added to the show on April 7, 1958. WROC-TV enjoyed ratings dominance with popular anchorman Tom Decker and weatherman Bob Mills. Anne Keefe, another well-known talent who split time between WROC radio and TV, contributed to the station's success in the 1960s and 1970s. However, by the mid-1970s, Decker, Mills and Keefe left. The loss of these popular veteran broadcasters and the station's failure to keep up with changing technology lead to a ratings slump that lasted more than three decades.

From the mid-1970s through the early 2000s, WROC-TV's newscasts struggled in the Nielsen ratings, usually placing a distant third behind WOKR/WHAM-TV and WHEC-TV. Even with the strong NBC prime time lineup in the mid-to-late 1980s (the last few years of WROC-TV's affiliation contract with NBC) and the CBS lineup during the early 2000s, its newscasts remained stubbornly in third place. Indeed, the subpar performance of channel 8's news department was a major factor in NBC moving to WHEC-TV in 1989.

However, after WROC finally established some stability with its anchor team, market share has been growing over the course of the past decade. In the November 2008 ratings period, WROC-TV's 11 p.m. newscast finished ahead of slumping WHEC-TV for the first time in many years.

After becoming operated by Nexstar, WUHF's separate news department was shut down. Two anchors, a producer, and a photographer were added to WROC-TV's news staff. The remainder of its personnel was laid-off in this move. On September 1, 2005, a nightly half-hour prime time broadcast (produced by WROC-TV) called Fox First at 10 began airing on WUHF. Originating from a secondary set at this station's facilities, the show eventually expanded to 45 minutes followed by a fifteen-minute sports highlight program known as Sports Extra. On September 13, 2010, this station began airing a weekday 4 p.m. newscast for a half-hour (an area first). As of 2011, WROC-TV's newscasts remain in third place overall. On September 4, 2012, WROC-TV became the second Rochester area TV station to have upgraded its local newscasts to high definition. The 10 p.m. newscast on WUHF was included in the upgrade. WROC's relationship with WUHF ended in December 2013 due to Sinclair's purchase of the assets of ABC affiliate WHAM-TV (along with the sale of its license to an affiliated company), and the relocation of WUHF to its facilities. WUHF's 10 p.m. newscast was replaced by a WHAM-produced version on January 1, 2014.

=== Notable former on-air staff ===
- Anne Montgomery – sportscaster, 1985–1987
- Stacey Pensgen – chief meteorologist (AMS Seal of Approval)

== Technical information ==
=== Subchannels ===
The station's signal is multiplexed:

Subchannels of WROC-TV
Subchannel	Res.	Short name	Programming
8.1	1080i	CBS	CBS
8.2	480i	BOUNCE	Bounce TV
8.3	480i	GRIT	Grit
8.4	480i	MYSTERY	Ion Mystery
31.1	720p	WUHF-DT	Fox (WUHF)

Broadcast on behalf of another station

On June 15, 2016, Nexstar announced that it has entered into an affiliation agreement with Katz Broadcasting for the Escape, Laff, Grit, and Bounce TV networks, bringing one or more of the four networks to 81 stations owned and/or operated by Nexstar, including WROC-TV. As a result, WROC-TV added two additional subchannels carrying Escape and Laff on August 20, 2016 (at the time of the agreement, Grit was available in Rochester on WHAM-DT3).

=== Analog-to-digital conversion ===
WROC-TV discontinued regular programming on its analog signal, over VHF channel 8, at 11:35 p.m. on June 12, 2009 (following the late newscast), the official date on which full-power television stations in the United States transitioned from analog to digital broadcasts under federal mandate. The station's digital signal remained on its pre-transition UHF channel 45, using virtual channel 8.
