= WOKR (AM) =

Talk radio station in Canandaigua, New York

- Canandaigua, New York; United States
- Broadcast area: East side of Rochester
- Frequency: 1310 kHz C-QUAM AM stereo
- Branding: WOKR 1310

Programming
- Format: Classic country

Ownership
- Owner: Tim Stratton and Stratton Radio Broadcasting Company, LLC; (1310 FLX Radio, Inc)
- Sister stations: WRSB; WDNY; WDXT

History
- First air date: April 5, 1997; 28 years ago
- Former call signs: WCGR (1997–1998); WRSB (1998–2017)
- Call sign meaning: "We're OK Rochester" (homage to what is now WHAM-TV)

Technical information
- Licensing authority: FCC
- Facility ID: 88676
- Class: B
- Power: 1,000 watts
- Transmitter coordinates: 42°53′20.2″N 77°19′7.9″W
- Translator: 95.5 W238DG (Canandaigua)

Links
- Public license information: Public file; LMS
- Webcast: Listen live (via TuneIn)
- Website: wokrcountry.com

WOKR (1310 AM) is a radio station broadcasting a classic country music format. Licensed to Canandaigua, New York, United States, the station is owned by Tim Stratton, through licensee 1310 FLX Radio, Inc.

== History ==
The station went on the air as WCGR on October 14, 1997. On October 5, 1998, the station changed its call sign to WRSB; it operated intermittently throughout the 1990s and 2000s.

The station was acquired by Genesee Media Corporation on June 8, 2013, at a price of $450,000. The station added high-quality C-QUAM AM stereo broadcasting in October 2013. It swapped call signs with its simulcast partner on August 1, 2017, taking on the call sign WOKR (which pays homage to what is now WHAM-TV). The station formerly broadcast on 105.5 FM (W288CS), but Genesee Media Corporation sold the FM translator to Bluelight Communications for a price of $650,000, and launched an Urban/R&B station on the translator.

The 105.5 translator was replaced by Genesee Media Corporation by translator W258BH (97.5 FM).

On September 21, 2017, WOKR changed formats from sports to talk and the 97.5 translator switched to a simulcast of sister station WRSB (which in turn flipped to Spanish). The new format contained a collection of shows from Fox News Radio, Compass Media Networks, Bloomberg Radio and Radio America.

On November 12, 2018, WOKR changed formats to classic country and added FM translator W238DG (95.5). An agreement to sell the station to Timothy Stratton (owner of WYLF) was struck in October 2019, and consummated on March 1, 2020, at a price of $250,000.

As of 11 pm, Sunday May 2, 2021, WOKR changed its format to classic hits and included a more local focus for the Canandaigua area, featuring local news, weather and sports. As of July 2022, WOKR returned to airing its classic country format.

== Translators ==
Broadcast translator for WOKR (AM) (Main Programming)
Call sign	Frequency	City of license	FID	ERP (W)	HAAT	Class	Transmitter coordinates	FCC info
W238DG	95.5 FM	Canandaigua, New York	202662	250	49 m (161 ft)	D	42°53′20″N 77°19′9″W	LMS
