= WHAM-TV =

Television station in Rochester, New York

- Rochester, New York; United States
- Channels: Digital: 9 (VHF); Virtual: 13
- Branding: 13 WHAM ABC; 13 WHAM News; CW Rochester (13.2)

Programming
- Affiliations: 13.1: ABC; 13.2: The CW; for others, see § Subchannels

Ownership
- Owner: Sinclair Broadcast Group; (WHAM Licensee, LLC)
- Sister stations: WUHF

History
- First air date: September 15, 1962 (Note: The current licensee assumed control on March 1, 1970, and this is nominally the start of the existing license.)
- Former call signs: WAAE-TV (CP, 1967–1970); WOKR (interim operation 1962–1970, current incarnation 1970–2005)
- Former channel numbers: Analog: 13 (VHF, 1962–2009); Digital: 59 (UHF, 2002–2009), 13 (VHF, 2009–2019)
- Call sign meaning: taken from former sister WHAM radio, pronounced like "wham"

Technical information
- Licensing authority: FCC
- Facility ID: 73371
- ERP: 30 kW
- HAAT: 155 m (509 ft)
- Transmitter coordinates: 43°8′7″N 77°35′2″W

Links
- Public license information: Public file; LMS
- Website: 13wham.com; cwrochester.com

WHAM-TV (channel 13) is a television station in Rochester, New York, United States, affiliated with ABC and The CW. It is owned by Sinclair Broadcast Group alongside Fox affiliate WUHF (channel 31). The two stations share studios on West Henrietta Road (NY 15) in Henrietta (with a Rochester mailing address); WHAM-TV's transmitter is located on Pinnacle Hill on the border between Rochester and Brighton.

== History ==
=== WOKR ===
The station signed on at 4 p.m. on September 15, 1962, as WOKR (for "We're OK Rochester"). It has always been an ABC affiliate, and is the only commercial station in the area that has never changed its affiliation. It originally operated from studios located on South Clinton Avenue in Rochester.

The station's original local owner, Channel 13 of Rochester, Inc., was composed of the Flower City Television Corporation, the Rochester Educational Television Association, the Genesee Valley Television Company, Star TV, Inc., Community Broadcasting, Inc., Heritage Radio and Television Broadcasting Company, Main Broadcasting Company, Federal Broadcasting Systems, Citizens Television Corporation, Rochester Broadcasting, Inc., and Rochester Telecasters, Inc., all of whom were equal shareholders until March 1970, when Flower City bought out its partners. Flower City sold the station to Post Corporation, a media conglomerate based in the Fox Cities region of Wisconsin, in 1977. George N. Gillett Jr. purchased the Post Corporation stations in 1984, transferring it into Gillett Holdings, Inc. Hughes Broadcasting Partners (Paul Hughes and Veronis, Suhler & Associates) purchased the station in 1991. Hughes then sold WOKR to Guy Gannett Communications in 1995.

=== WHAM-TV ===
Guy Gannett sold its stations to the Sinclair Broadcast Group in 1998; as Sinclair already owned WUHF, it then spun off WOKR to the Ackerley Group, with the acquisition closing in April 1999. The station came under common ownership with WHAM radio (1180 AM), in June 2002 after the Ackerley Group merged with Clear Channel Communications, WHAM radio's owner. Speculation immediately started about whether WOKR would take on the WHAM-TV calls, which had been used on what is now WROC-TV from 1949 until 1956. On January 10, 2005, at 1:42 a.m., channel 13 signed off-the-air for the last time as WOKR and returned to the air at 4:59 a.m. that same day as WHAM-TV. The WOKR call letters then moved to sister station WUCL in Remsen, New York (now Air 1 affiliate WAWR; in 2015, when the Remsen station dropped the calls, a radio station in Rochester picked up the WOKR calls and returned them to the market, swapping them with Canandaigua sister station WRSB in 2017). This was part of a strategy that Clear Channel would use the older callsign for an existing TV station they co-owned with the radio stations, the others were in San Antonio and Syracuse.

For many years, WOKR was one of three Rochester area stations offered on cable in the Ottawa–Gatineau and Eastern Ontario regions. The Rochester area stations were replaced with Detroit channels in September 2003 when the microwave relay system that provided these signals was discontinued. Until January 2009, WHAM-TV was also the ABC affiliate carried in several Central Ontario communities such as Belleville, Cobourg, and Lindsay. Buffalo ABC affiliate WKBW-TV replaced WHAM-TV in these communities.

On November 16, 2006, Clear Channel announced its intention to sell off all of its television stations after the company was bought by private equity firms. On April 20, 2007, the company entered into an agreement to sell its entire television stations group to Newport Television, a broadcasting holding company established by the private equity firm Providence Equity Partners. The sale separated WHAM-TV from WHAM radio (which remains owned by Clear Channel, now iHeartMedia); however, the WHAM-TV call sign has been retained, and the two stations have continued a news partnership.

WHAM-TV discontinued regular programming on its analog signal, over VHF channel 13, on June 12, 2009, the official date on which full-power television stations in the United States transitioned from analog to digital broadcasts under federal mandate. The station's digital signal relocated from its pre-transition UHF channel 59, which was among the high band UHF channels (52-69) that were removed from broadcasting use as a result of the transition, to its analog-era VHF channel 13.

On July 19, 2012, Newport Television announced the sale of 22 of its 27 stations to the Nexstar Broadcasting Group, Sinclair Broadcast Group and Cox Media Group. While most of WHAM-TV's New York State sisters were sold to Nexstar, a buyer for WHAM-TV was not announced until December 3, when Newport sold its non-license assets to Sinclair. The license was sold to Deerfield Media for $54 million. Sinclair could not acquire the WHAM-TV license because of its continued ownership of WUHF (though it holds an option to do so); Nexstar could not purchase WHAM-TV because it already owned CBS affiliate WROC-TV. Rochester has only five full-power stations—not enough to legally permit a duopoly. WHAM-TV is also the only ABC affiliate owned by Newport Television that was not sold to Nexstar. With the announced sales in November of two additional stations to Nexstar and KMTR in Eugene, Oregon, to Fisher Communications (which was later sold itself to Sinclair in May 2013), WHAM-TV was the last Newport Television station without a buyer. On January 30, 2013, the Federal Communications Commission (FCC) granted approval of the transaction, and it was consummated two days later.

On December 31, 2013, WUHF terminated its eight-year SSA with WROC-TV, and the station was re-located to WHAM-TV's studios. On January 1, 2014, WUHF introduced two WHAM-TV-produced newscasts, Good Day Rochester and a 10 p.m. newscast, which were both previously seen on its CW-affiliated subchannel WHAM-DT2.

On July 28, 2021, the FCC issued a Forfeiture Order against Deerfield Media stemming from a lawsuit involving WHAM-TV. The lawsuit, filed by AT&T, alleged that Deerfield Media failed to negotiate for retransmission consent in good faith for WHAM-TV and other Sinclair-managed stations. Deerfield was ordered to pay a fine of $512,228 per station named in the lawsuit, including WHAM-TV.

On September 26, 2025, Sinclair announced that it will acquire WHAM outright, creating a legal duopoly with WUHF. The sale was completed on March 1, 2026.

== CW Rochester ==
WHAM-DT2, branded as CW Rochester (formerly CW WHAM), is the CW-affiliated second digital subchannel of WHAM-TV, broadcasting in high definition on channel 13.2.

=== History ===
The station began as a cable-only WB affiliate in 2000 on Time Warner Cable channel 26. The station was created by Lynette Baker, Time Warner Cable's local programming manager, as an entertainment programming replacement for the independent channel WGRC channel 9, which was in the process of being relaunched as 24-hour news channel R News. Baker approached The WB to launch a cable only affiliate as all the broadcast licenses in the Rochester market were allocated (this preceded the launch of The WB 100+ Station Group in 1998, which afforded cable providers the opportunity to launch cable-exclusive WB affiliates in smaller markets, displacing the superstation feed of Chicago's WGN-TV, which served as the national feed of The WB until then). The network distribution staff headed by Ken Werner and Hal Protter agreed to the cable license. In December 2000, the station became a joint venture of Time Warner Cable and The WB, named Rochester Television Ventures, LLC; it used the fictional call sign "WRWB-TV". The venture kept Lynette Baker as the Director of Operations and hired Tish Robinson as general manager and Steve Arvan as general sales manager.

Rochester Television Ventures choose Jay Advertising Inc. as marketing and advertising agency of record for the channel in November 2000. At that time, the channel was expected to go live in January 2001. Tish Robinson was the channel's initial general manager. WRWB re-launched in December on channel 26, only to be moved to channel 16 in late December 2000.

Robinson planned for the channel to launch its own news programming in 2001, but revenue was below expectations, forcing its postponement until 2003. After the September 11 attacks, the channel replaced an airing of the martial arts movie Mortal Kombat with the family comedy Dennis the Menace. In May 2003, the channel began carrying Rochester Knighthawks National Lacrosse League games.

In mid-2004, Rochester Television Ventures added marketing and communications services to improve the channel's revenues and to fill the void of the loss of smaller advertising agencies. By this time, the cable channel had scrapped plans for newscasts and carried The Daily Buzz morning news show with local weather updates from TWC's R News.

On January 24, 2006, the Warner Bros. unit of Time Warner and CBS Corporation announced that they would shut down and merge their UPN and WB networks to create a new network called The CW. WRWB's CW affiliation was officially announced in early March. On November 13, 2006, WHAM-TV purchased WRWB-TV from Time Warner Cable. It renamed the service "CW WHAM" and began to simulcast on a new second digital subchannel of WHAM to offer over-the-air viewers access to CW programming. CW WHAM moved its operations and four of its staff from the downtown Rochester studios into WHAM-TV's facilities in Henrietta.

== News operation ==
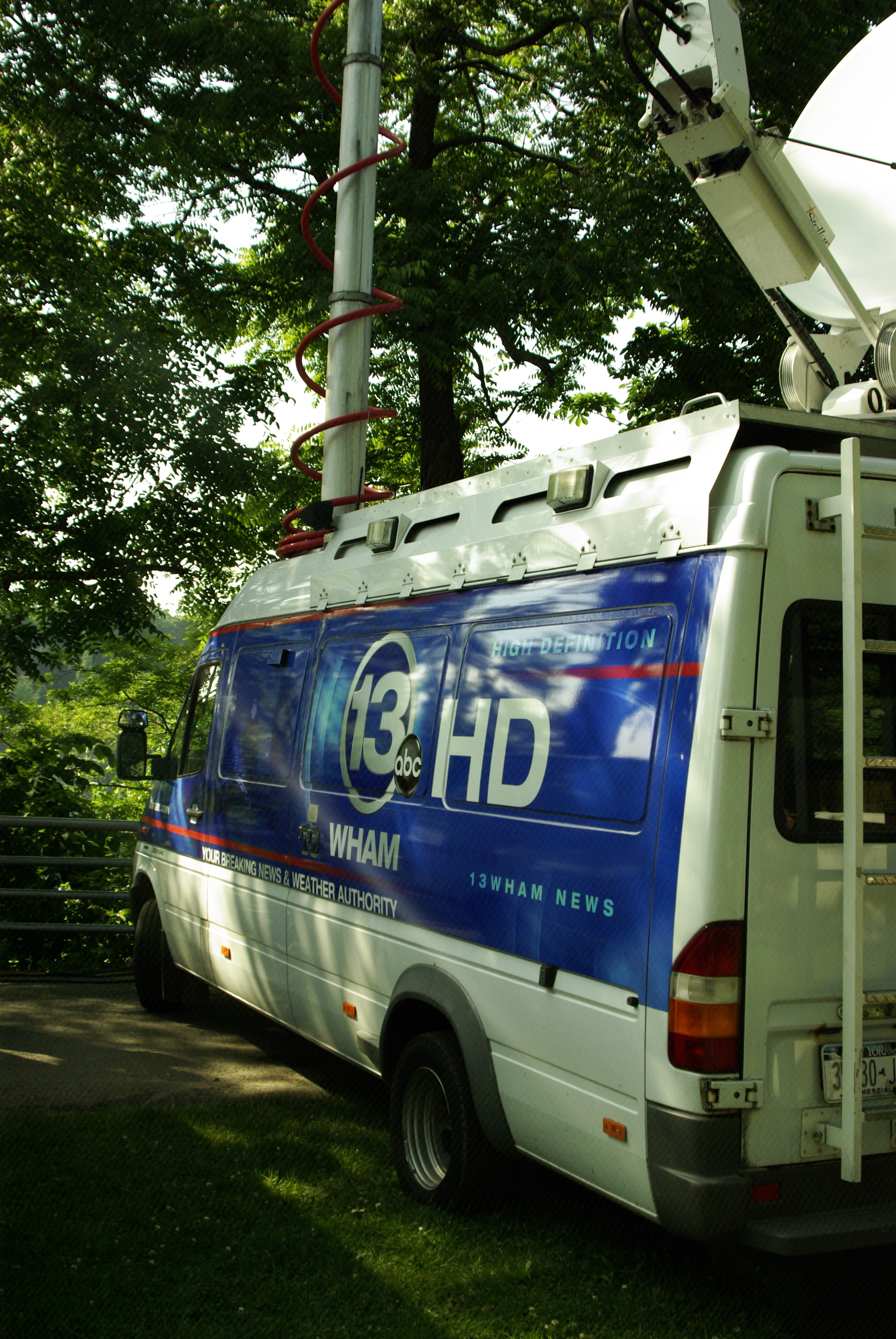
WHAM news truck

WHAM-TV has led the news ratings in Rochester for most of the last four decades. The station's lead anchorman, Don Alhart, was with the station from June 6, 1966, until his retirement on June 6, 2024. As of 2007, portions of WHAM-TV's programming (including its weekday noon newscast) is streamed live on its website. On January 15, 2007, the station expanded its weekday morning show to include two hours (7 to 9 a.m.) on WHAM-DT2. On September 13, 2010, WHAM-TV became the first station in Rochester to broadcast newscasts in high definition. The station debuted an updated logo featuring the "circle 13" design (a derivative of the circle 7 logo) similar to fellow ABC affiliate WTVG in Toledo, Ohio. The shows on WHAM-DT2 were included in the upgrade and currently can be seen in HD over-the-air or on Spectrum channels 16 and 1212.

On January 1, 2011, WHAM-DT2 began to air a half-hour 10 p.m. newscast, 13 WHAM News on Rochester's CW. The newscast competed primarily with WUHF's WROC-produced newscast. On January 1, 2014, after WUHF merged with WHAM, this newscast was moved to the station as 13 WHAM News on Fox Rochester. WUHF also added a morning show, Good Day Rochester, airing from 7 to 9 a.m. In September 2014, the Good Day Rochester title was extended to WHAM's morning show, while WUHF also began to simulcast the 6:30 a.m. segment of the program.

WHAM-TV also provided sports and weather reports for WUTV in Buffalo from 2021 to 2023.

== Subchannels ==
The station's signal is multiplexed:

Subchannels of WHAM-TV
Subchannel	Res.	Short name	Programming
13.1	720p	WHAM-HD	ABC
13.2	720p	CW-WHAM	The CW
13.3	480i	Charge!	Charge!
13.4	480i	TheNest	The Nest
31.2	480i	Antenna	Antenna TV (WUHF)
31.3	480i	Comet	Comet (WUHF)

Broadcast on behalf of another station
