= WRSB (AM) =

Spanish music radio station in Brockport, New York, United States

- Brockport, New York; United States
- Broadcast area: Rochester metropolitan area
- Frequency: 1600 kHz
- Branding: Mega 97.5

Programming
- Language: Spanish
- Format: Tropical
- Affiliations: Premiere Networks

Ownership
- Owner: Brian McGlynn; (Genesee Media Corporation)
- Operator: Uno Communications
- Sister stations: WOKR; WDNY; WDXT; WYLF

History
- First air date: 1970 (as WADD at 1560)
- Former call signs: WADD (1970–1976); WWBK (1976–1980); WJBT (1980–1984); WASB (1984–2015); WOKR (2015–2017)
- Former frequencies: 1560 kHz (1970–1979); 1590 kHz (1979–2023)

Technical information
- Licensing authority: FCC
- Facility ID: 15767
- Class: D
- Power: 300 watts day; 5 watts night
- Transmitter coordinates: 43°11′45.2″N 77°57′5″W
- Translator: 97.5 W248BH (Rochester)

Links
- Public license information: Public file; LMS
- Webcast: Listen live
- Website: www.lamegaroc.com

WRSB (1600 kHz) is a commercial AM radio station licensed to Brockport, New York, and serving the Rochester metropolitan area. The station broadcasts a Spanish tropical radio format and is owned by Brian McGlynn, through licensee Genesee Media Corporation. It is operated by William Santiago through his company Uno Communications.

WRSB is powered at 300 watts day and 5 watts night both non-directionally. It was previously 1,000 watts, using a directional antenna with a three-tower array, to protect other stations on 1590 AM from interference. The transmitter is off Route 31 in Brockport. Programming is also heard on 250 watt FM translator W248BH at 97.5 MHz in Rochester. WRSB uses the FM dial position in calling itself "La Mega 97.5." It only refers to the AM station in its legal station identification once per hour.

== History ==
In 1970, the station signed on the air as WADD and was owned by a group of local businessmen. The station was a daytimer, broadcasting on 1560 kHz with a power of 1,000 watts, utilizing a three tower in-line directional antenna. It had to go off the air at night because 1560 AM is a clear channel frequency reserved in the East for WQXR (now WFME) in New York City.

In 1976, the station was purchased by Canal Communications, inc. and the call sign changed to WWBK. It had a full service, middle of the road format of community news and adult pop music. The station's radio personalities at the time included Ron Dylewski, Tim Tango, Rick Hardenbrook (The All American Boy) and the general manager was Don Fuller. In 1979, WWBK obtained a construction permit allowing it to broadcast at 1,000 watts full-time, by moving up the dial to 1590 kHz. The facility was sold in 1979 and the call letters changed to WJBT on April 14, 1980. On May 24, 1984, the station changed its call sign to WASB.

After moving to 1590, it continued to use its directional array to protect the daytime signals of WGGO and WAUB, two stations on the same frequency to the south and east respectively. It was thus audible mostly in Orleans County, with a moderate signal in Genesee and Niagara Counties and almost no signal in the city of Rochester. The fringe signals of WGGO and WRSB interfere with each other in the city of Buffalo.

The station was purchased by Genesee Media Corporation on July 8, 2013, at a price of $450,000, which included WRSB in Canandaigua. A call sign change to WOKR followed on January 22, 2015; the WOKR call was formerly used on TV channel 13 (now WHAM-TV) for most of its existence (they had been parked on a station in the Mohawk Valley for several years until a change in that station's ownership made the WOKR calls available for use in Rochester again).

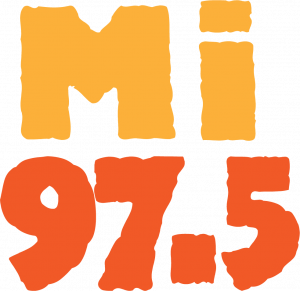
Logo as "Mi 97.5"

On August 1, 2017, the station swapped call signs with its simulcast partner, taking on the call sign WRSB. On October 16, 2017, WRSB changed the format from sports to a full-service Spanish CHR, branded as "Mi 97.5". The station is one of two Spanish-language outlets in the Rochester market, the other being non-commercial low-power WEPL-LP on 97.1. On January 1, 2019, WRSB changed its moniker to "Mega 97.5".

In May 2023, WRSB changed AM frequencies from 1590 kHz to 1600 kHz, eliminating co-channel interference from surrounding stations.
