= Mass media in Rochester, New York =

This is a list of mass media in Rochester, New York, and its surrounding area.

== Print media ==
=== Daily newspapers ===
- Democrat and Chronicle, Rochester's main daily newspaper, published since 1833
  - Insider magazine (owned by the Democrat and Chronicle)
- The Daily Record – legal, real estate, and business daily, has published Monday through Friday since 1908

=== Weekly and monthly publications ===
- City Newspaper – free, monthly publication published since 1972
- Genesee Valley Penny Saver – free, weekly magazine
- Rochester Business Journal – weekly business paper
- The Good Life Magazine – free bi-monthly publication
- Rochester Indymedia – grassroots, democratically run Independent Media Center
- Minority Reporter – free, weekly African-American newspaper
  - La Voz – an associated monthly, bilingual newspaper for the area's Hispanic population
- The Empty Closet – free monthly LGBT magazine that has been published since 1971, making it the oldest LGBT publication in New York and one of the oldest in the United States
- The Catholic Courier – circulated by the Roman Catholic Diocese of Rochester since 1889

=== Student publications ===
- The Campus Times (University of Rochester)
- The Monroe Doctrine (Monroe Community College)
- The Reporter (Rochester Institute of Technology)
- Gracies Dinnertime Theatre (run by students from Monroe Community College, Rochester Institute of Technology, and University of Rochester. 1995-2005, 2025-present. Publishes 30 issues/academic year)

=== Defunct newspapers ===
Frederick Douglass' abolitionist newspaper The North Star was published in Rochester from 1847 to 1851 and merged with Gerrit Smith's Liberty Party Paper (based in Syracuse, New York) to form Frederick Douglass' Paper, which was published until 1860.

The Rochester Daily Advertiser was published by Luther Tucker, its first issue being 25 October 1826. It was the first daily paper published west of Albany.

Rochester was served by the Rochester Post Express published by the Post Express Print Company from 1882 to 1923. In 1923 the paper merged with the Rochester News Corporation's Rochester Evening Journal to become Rochester Evening Journal and The Post Express and served the area from 1923 through 1937. Rochester's evening paper for many years was the Times-Union, which merged operations with the Democrat and Chronicle in 1992, going defunct five years later.

The Union and Advertiser, also known as the Daily Union and Advertiser, was published by Curtis, Butts & Co. from 1856 until at least 1886. For at least part of its history it was a daily. Several volumes are part of the Library of Congress' collection. It was succeeded in 1918 by the Rochester Times-Union.

New Women's Times (1975–1985) was a radical feminist newspaper that had reached a national readership by end of its publication. In 1981, it had a circulation of 25,000.

Freetime (1987–2016) was a free, weekly entertainment magazine.

About... time (1972–2002) was an African-American magazine.

The Rochester Patriot published 23 times a year from around 1972 until 1982.

The Jewish Ledger – weekly newspaper serving the Rochester area's Jewish community since 1924. Stopped publication in December 2020 due to the COVID-19 pandemic.

The Monroe County Post – had different publications serving different parts of the Rochester area. Gannett discontinued the publications in 2020 as a cost-saving move.

== Television, Cable and Radio ==
=== Television ===
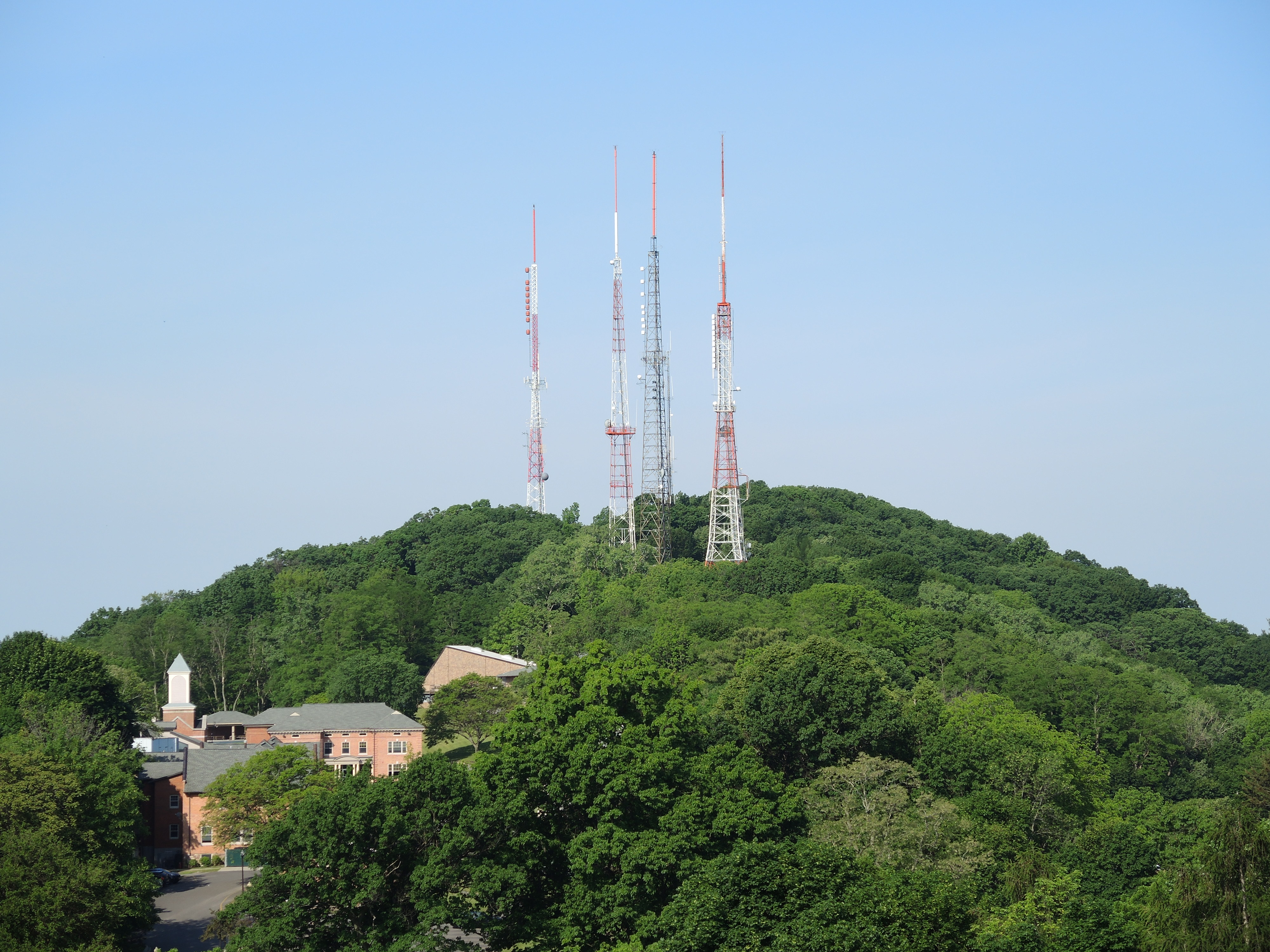
The television broadcast towers at Pinnacle Hill

Rochester is served by eight broadcast television stations:

- CBS: WROC-TV 8 (cable 8)
- NBC: WHEC-TV 10 (cable 10)
- ABC: WHAM 13 (cable 13)
- PBS: WXXI-TV 21 (cable 11)
- Fox: WUHF 31 (cable 7)
- MyNetworkTV: WBGT-CD 46 (cable 18)
- CW: WHAM-DT2 (13–2) (cable 16)
- Rochester Community TV (RCTV cable 15)

=== Cable ===
Charter Communications provides Rochester with cable-fed internet service, digital and standard cable television, and Spectrum News 1 Rochester, a 24-hour local news channel.

=== Radio ===
Rochester is served by a number of AM and FM radio stations:

Frequency	Call sign	Format	Notes
AM 950	WROC	Sports (WOS/WGR)	Also heard on 95.7 W239BF in Rochester
AM 990	WDCX	Religious	Also heard on 107.1 W296EF in Rochester
AM 1040	WYSL	Talk radio	Licensed to Avon and heard on 92.1 W221CL in Rochester
AM 1180	WHAM	News/Talk	Also heard on 96.1 W241DG in Rochester
AM 1280	WHTK	Sports (FSR)	
AM 1310	WOKR	Classic country	Licensed to Canandaigua and is heard on 95.5 W238DG in Canandaigua
AM 1370	WXXI	public radio	Also heard on WXXI-FM
AM 1420	WACK	Full-service (talk/classic hits)	Licensed to Newark and heard on 96.9 W245DI in Sodus
AM 1460	WHIC	Catholic	Also heard on 92.9 W225AR in Rochester
AM 1600	WRSB	Spanish tropical	Licensed to Brockport and heard on 97.5 W248BH in Rochester
FM 88.5	WRUR-FM	AAA/NPR	
FM 89.7	WITR	Campus radio	Licensed to Henrietta
FM 90.1	WGMC	Jazz/Ethnic	Licensed to Greece
FM 90.5	WBER	Alternative radio	
FM 90.9	WIRQ	Alternative	
FM 91.5	WXXO	Classical	
FM 92.5	WBEE-FM	Country	
FM 93.3	WFKL	Adult hits	Licensed to Fairport
FM 94.1	WZNE	Alternative rock	Licensed to Brighton
FM 95.1	WAIO	Active rock	Licensed to Honeoye Falls
FM 96.5	WCMF-FM	Classic rock	
FM 97.1	WEPL-LP	Latin music/Talk	
FM 97.9	WPXY-FM	CHR/Top 40	
FM 98.9	WBZA	Adult hits	
FM 99.7	WZXV	Christian radio	Licensed to Palmyra
FM 100.5	WDVI	Country	
FM 100.9	WXIR-LP	Variety	www.1009wxir.com
FM 101.3	WRMM-FM	Adult contemporary	
FM 101.9	W270BX	Christian radio	Relays WMHN 89.3 Webster (Mars Hill Network)
FM 102.7	WLGZ-FM	Classic hits	Licensed to Webster and heard on 105.5 W288CS HD2 in Rochester
FM 103.5	WUUF	Country	Licensed to Sodus
FM 103.9	WDKX	Urban contemporary	
FM 104.3	WAYO-LP	Free-form	
FM 104.9	WKDL	Contemporary christian (K-Love)	Licensed to Brockport
FM 105.9	WXXI-FM	public radio	
FM 106.3	WRFZ-LP	Community radio	www.rochesterfreeradio.com
FM 106.7	WKGS	Rhythmic contemporary	Licensed to Irondequoit
FM 107.3	WNBL	1980s hits	Licensed to South Bristol

To see a complete list of radio stations in Rochester including the Rochester Metropolitan area, please see: (Rochester radio)
