= WROC =

WROC may refer to:

- WROC (AM), a radio station (950 AM) licensed to Rochester, New York, United States
- WROC-TV, a television station (channel 21, virtual channel 8) licensed to Rochester, New York, United States
- WHTK (AM), a radio station (1280 AM) licensed to Rochester, New York, United States, which used the call sign WROC from 1961 until 1979
- WPXY-FM, a radio station (97.9 FM) licensed to Rochester, New York, United States, which used the call sign WROC-FM until 1976

Wroc may refer to:

- Wrocław University of Technology, an autonomous technical university in Wrocław, Poland
