= WHTK =

WHTK may refer to:

- WHTK (AM), a radio station (1280 AM) licensed to Rochester, New York, United States
- WNBL (FM), a radio station (107.3 FM) licensed to South Bristol Township, New York, United States, known as WHTK-FM from 2009 to 2012
- WALR-FM, a radio station (104.1 FM) licensed to Greenville, Georgia, United States, known as WHTK-FM in January 1994
