= WVET =

WVET may refer to:

- WVET-LP, a low-power radio station (92.1 FM) licensed to serve Fort McCoy, Florida, United States; see List of radio stations in Florida
- WHEC-TV, a television station (channel 10) licensed to serve Rochester, New York, United States, which also held the call sign WVET-TV from 1953 to 1961
- WHTK (AM), a radio station (1280 AM) licensed to serve Rochester, New York, which held the call sign WVET from 1947 to 1961
