= WSNP =

WSNP may refer to:

- WSNP-LP, a low-power radio station (105.9 FM) licensed to serve Stevens Point, Wisconsin, United States
- WNBL (FM), a radio station (107.3 FM) licensed to serve South Bristol Township, New York, United States, which held the call sign WSNP from 2006 to 2007
