= First Federal Plaza =

Office building in Rochester, New York

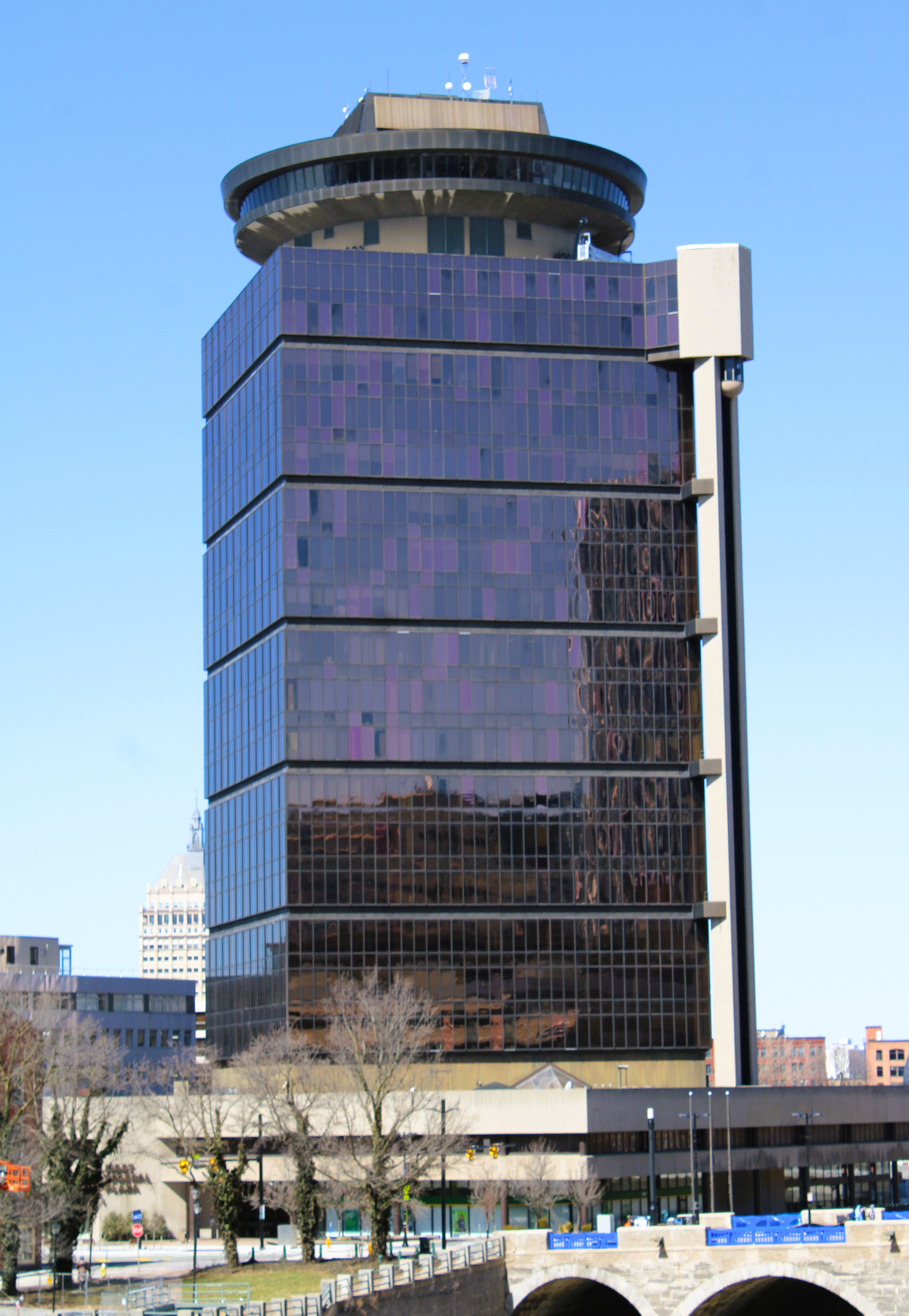

General information
- Status: Completed
- Type: Office; Revolving restaurant (before 1988)
- Location: 26-28 E. Main St. Rochester, NY
- Coordinates: 43.1565°N 77.6116°W
- Construction started: April 1974
- Completed: 1976
- Opening: June 1976

Technical details
- Floor count: 21
- Floor area: 383,000 sq ft (35,600 m^{2})
- Lifts/elevators: 11

Design and construction
- Architects: Corgan, Balestiere and Leaper

First Federal Plaza is a high-rise building located at 26-28 East Main Street in Rochester, New York, on the west bank of the Genesee River. It is the fifth tallest building in Rochester, standing at 309 feet (94 meters) with 21 floors. It was completed in 1976.

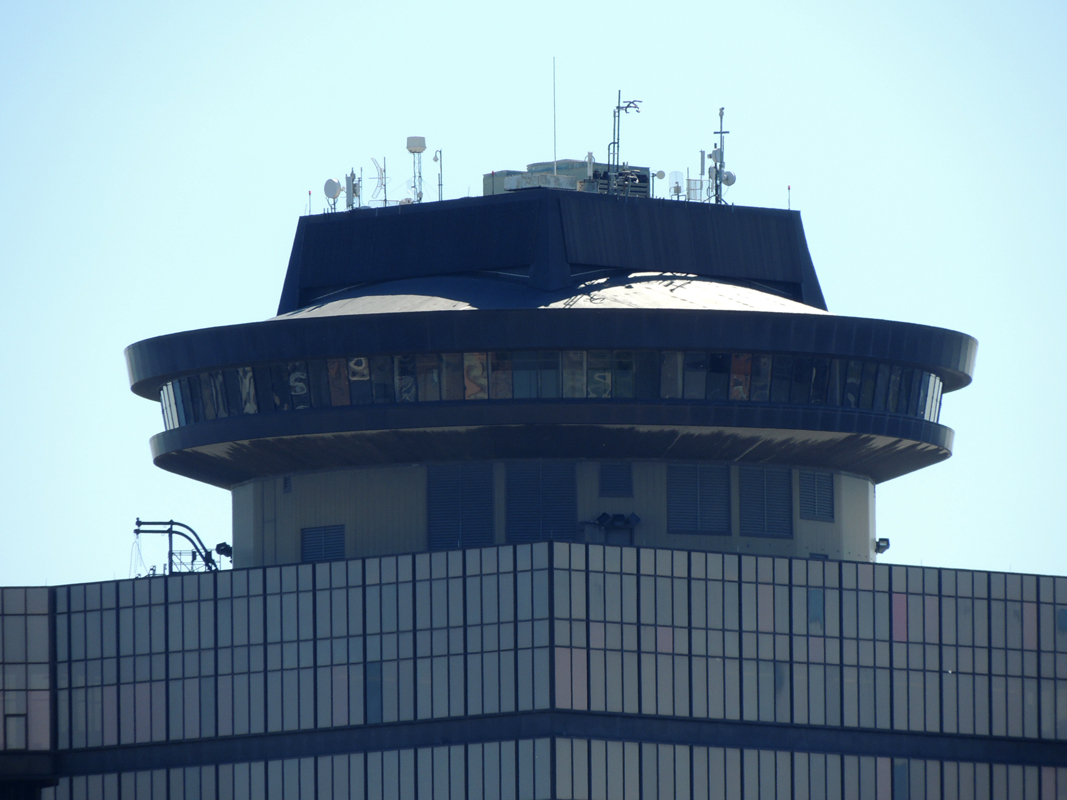
Closeup of the former rotating restaurant on top of the First Federal building

The building is known for its circular top, which used to be a 7,000-square-foot (650 m^{2}) revolving restaurant called Changing Scene. The ledges and center of the 21st floor were stationary, while a 10 feet (3.0 m)-wide section of the floor rotated, offering a changing view of the city landscape. The restaurant operated from 1977 to 1988, after which the rotating mechanism was dismantled and the area was converted to office space. The floor was later rented out by local Rochester attorney Christina Agola and Panasonic. In 2017, the band Joywave held a launch party for their album Content in the former restaurant space.

The building is also home to the studios for the Stephens Media Group radio stations in Rochester. (WFKL, WZNE, and WRMM-FM). In addition to the studios, WZNE and WRMM-FM both maintain an auxiliary (backup) transmitter facility on the top of the building.

The building has been used as part of 21 Stories for Scouts, an annual fundraiser for the Boy Scouts of America.

Reynolds II LP purchased the building for US$6,100,000 in 1998. In 2024, it was listed for sale again, with an asking price of US$10,100,000. Excelsior Communities purchased the building for US$2,800,000 in 2026 with plans to renovate the building into a mixed-use residential and commercial space.

== See also ==
- List of tallest buildings in Rochester, New York
