= WVOR =

Radio station in Canandaigua–Rochester, New York

- Canandaigua, New York; United States
- Broadcast area: Finger Lakes–Rochester metropolitan area
- Frequency: 102.3 MHz (HD Radio)
- Branding: Sunny 102.3

Programming
- Format: Adult contemporary
- Subchannels: HD2: Cool Oldies (Oldies); HD3: The Breeze (Soft AC)
- Affiliations: Premiere Networks

Ownership
- Owner: iHeartMedia, Inc.; (iHM Licenses, LLC)
- Sister stations: WAIO, WDVI, WHAM, WHTK, WKGS, WNBL

History
- First air date: July 16, 1974; 51 years ago
- Former call signs: WCGR-FM (1974–1975); WFLC (1975–1989); WLKA (1989–1996); WMHX (1996–1998); WISY (1998–1999); WMAX-FM (1999); WISY (1999–2006)
- Call sign meaning: Voice Of Rochester

Technical information
- Licensing authority: FCC
- Facility ID: 8505
- Class: A
- ERP: 3,400 watts
- HAAT: 86 meters (282 ft)
- Transmitter coordinates: 42°51′47″N 77°19′22″W

Links
- Public license information: Public file; LMS
- Webcast: Listen Live; Listen Live (HD2); Listen Live (HD3)
- Website: radiosunny.iheart.com

WVOR (102.3 FM) is a commercial radio station licensed to Canandaigua, New York, and serving the Finger Lakes region and part of the Rochester metropolitan area. It broadcasts an adult contemporary radio format and is owned by iHeartMedia. In much of November and December, WVOR switches to all-Christmas music. The studios and offices are located at the Five Star Bank Plaza building in downtown Rochester

WVOR has an effective radiated power (ERP) of 3,400 watts. The transmitter site is on Bliss Road at Hickox Road in Canandaigua. WVOR broadcasts using HD Radio technology. The HD2 digital subchannel plays Oldies music. The HD3 subchannel carries the iHeartRadio Soft AC music service known as "The Breeze."

== History ==
On July 16, 1974, the station signed on the air as WCGR-FM, a simulcast of middle-of-the-road station WCGR 1550 AM. It became WFLC in 1975 and dropped the WCGR simulcast in favor of country music; the call letters stood for "Wayne Finger Lakes Country."

The call letters changed to WLKA on May 15, 1989. On February 19, 1996, the station changed its call sign to WMHX; the station then changed to WISY on March 1, 1998, to WMAX-FM on July 30, 1999, back to WISY on August 2, 1999. and to the current WVOR on June 27, 2006. The WVOR call sign was "parked" on 102.3 after the station that held that call sign, a heritage Rochester FM station now known as WDVI, changed its call sign and format in 2006.

To avoid cannibalizing WDVI's audience while it was an adult contemporary music station, WVOR focused its marketing efforts on its city of license, targeting Canandaigua and the western Finger Lakes. The station remains operated out of iHeart's Rochester offices and carries the company's syndicated Murphy, Sam & Jodi morning drive time program as well as evening request and dedication show Delilah. Some other shifts are voicetracked by DJs from other iHeartMedia stations.
