= Five Star Bank (New York) =

American bank

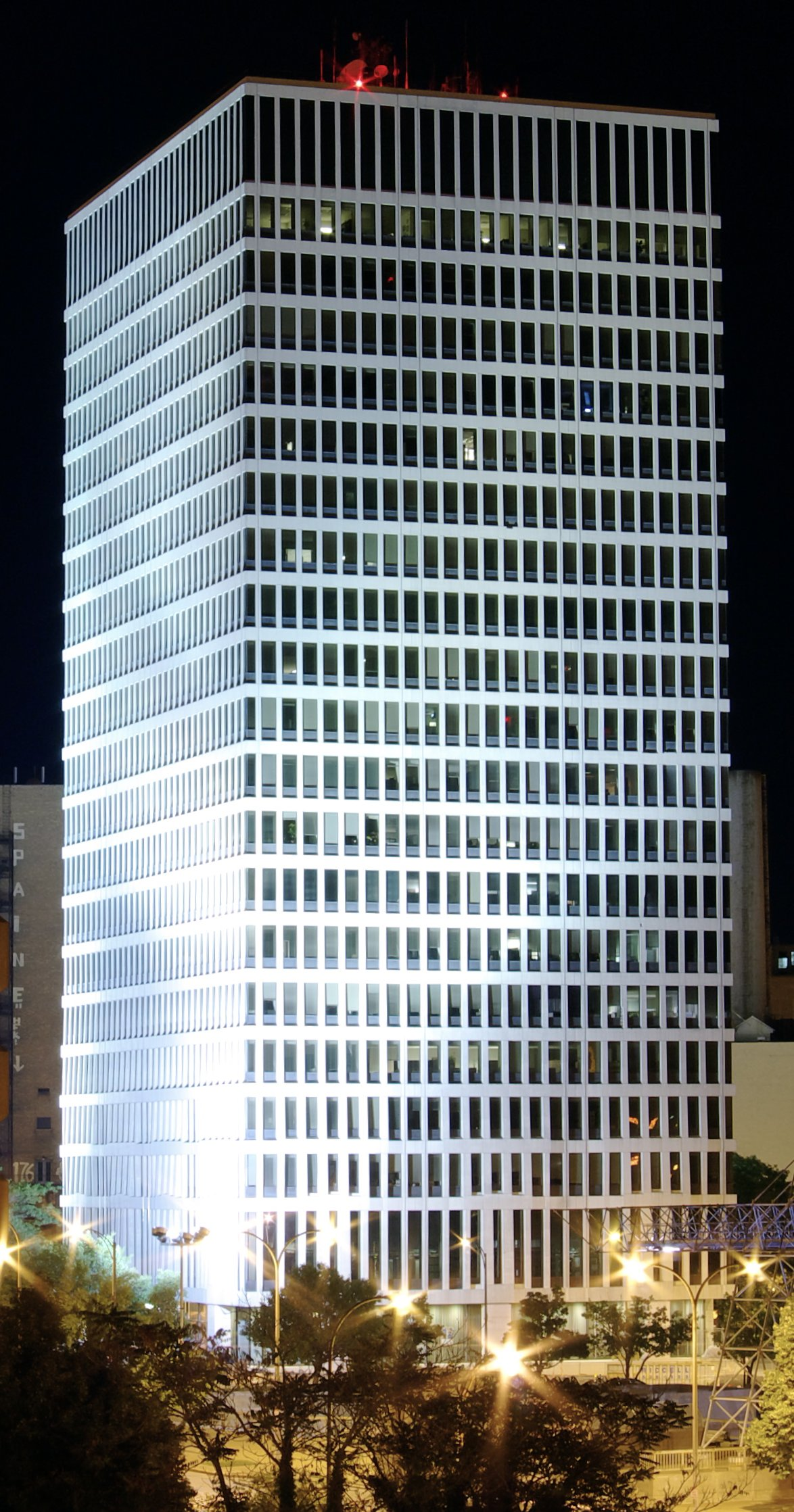
- Five Star Bank Plaza in Rochester
- Type: Private
- Industry: Financial services
- Predecessor: Wyoming County Bank; Bath National Bank; Pavilion State Bank; The National Bank of Geneva; First Tier Bank & Trust
- Founded: 2005
- Headquarters: Warsaw, New York, United States
- Number of locations: 48 branches (2026)
- Key people: Martin K. Birmingham, CEO & President
- Products: Personal Banking, Business Banking and Corporate Banking
- Total assets: ▲US$6,294,915 (2026); US$6,105,894 (2025)
- Owner: Financial Institutions, Inc. Nasdaq: FISI; Russell 2000 Index component
- Number of employees: 600+ (2012)
- Website: www.five-starbank.com

Five Star Bank is an American commercial bank headquartered in Warsaw, New York. Founded in 2005, Five Star Bank operates 48 branches across 14 counties in Western New York, and is a subsidiary of Financial Institutions, Inc.

Five Star Bank was established on November 29, 2005, through the merger of four banks owned by Financial Institutions, Inc.: Wyoming County Bank, founded in 1851 in Warsaw, New York; The National Bank of Geneva, founded in 1817 in Geneva, New York; First Tier Bank & Trust, founded in 1881 in Salamanca, New York (formerly Salamanca Trust Company) and Bath National Bank, founded in 1912 in Bath, New York. Branches began using the Five Star Bank name on December 5, 2005.

In 2012, Five Star Bank bought four HSBC branches (formerly part of Marine Midland Bank) and four First Niagara Bank branches. In 2016, Five Star Bank moved its regional offices to the former One HSBC Plaza in Rochester, New York, which was renamed Five Star Bank Plaza.

In 2022, Five Star Bank expanded its commercial lending business to Baltimore and Washington, D.C.

In 2025, Five Star Bank completed a $4 million renovation of its Warsaw headquarters. In 2026, Five Star Bank closed its flagship branch and former headquarters in downtown Warsaw.
