= Bob Lonsberry =

American talk show host

- Born: July 18, 1959 (age 67)

Bob Lonsberry (born July 18, 1959) is a conservative American radio talk show host, columnist, and author.

He has been a newspaper reporter, columnist, photojournalist and editor, as well as a magazine writer and commentator on radio and television and a television reporter and manager. He is the author of The Early Years, a collection of newspaper columns, as well as a collection of essays, and four short novels.

Lonsberry is a native of Canisteo, New York.

== Radio shows ==
Once using the promotional tagline "The most fired man in Rochester media," Lonsberry hosts three radio talk shows featuring a mix of news, political commentary, callers, and day-to-day anecdotes that air on WGY AM/FM in Albany, New York from 6 AM to 8 AM ET, WHAM in Rochester, New York, from 8 AM to 12 PM ET, and WSYR AM/FM in Syracuse, New York from 3 PM to 6 PM. Lonsberry formerly co-hosted a one-hour hot talk based show on WHAM from 9 PM to 10 PM with Jeremy Newman and formerly co-hosted the show, then two hours, on WAIO.

Lonsberry almost always expresses a conservative opinion about the issues he discusses on his talk shows. Typically, he spends most of his shows discussing local and state issues—less frequently discussing national issues. He also discusses life and family issues. Lonsberry is married to his third wife. He and his first wife divorced, and his second marriage was annulled.

When Lonsberry is absent, progressive talk radio host George Kilpatrick has occasionally filled in for him, a situation that brought Kilpatrick a certain degree of hate mail.

== Merchandising ==
In February 2009, Lonsberry began marketing the term "FUBO" on his radio show and website, selling T-shirts, bumper stickers and associated merchandise. Lonsberry's phrase was an acronym for "F-ck U Barack Obama" and was advertised as a means to denigrate President Obama. Fubo.tv's copyright forced Lonsberry to end the merchandising.

== Controversies ==
While Lonsberry was working as a talk show host for WHAM-Rochester in late 2003, an orangutan temporarily escaped its cage in Rochester's Seneca Park Zoo. Lonsberry made a comment on the escape while monkey sounds played, "a monkey's loose up at the zoo again--and he's running for county executive", comparing Mayor William A. Johnson, Jr. to the orangutan. The comments occurred during the mayoral race, and the candidates were Maggie A. Brooks, a white woman who was then county clerk, and Johnson, a black man who was then mayor. Lonsberry never mentioned Johnson by name. WHAM radio said in a statement that "although Mr. Lonsberry expressed a willingness to change, it became obvious to us that he is not embracing diversity."

Lonsberry was later fired from WHAM-AM for the orangutan remarks (but not from KNRS, both Clear Channel radio stations). When WHAM ratings in his time slot plunged, he was rehired after attending sensitivity training.

On June 16, 2010, Lonsberry was fired from KNRS in Salt Lake City, Utah, where he had hosted a show weekdays between 5 AM and 9 AM MT for a decade. In his daily web column, he stated that the station attributed his firing to his lower listener ratings following the introduction of the Portable People Meter. Lonsberry also suggested that his opposition to Mike Lee's candidacy for Utah's Senate seat may have been a factor. Lee, as an attorney, represented one of KNRS's advertisers, and Lonsberry wrote:

Of course, being suspicious is my stock-in-trade, and the timing of my termination and the stand I’ve been taking on the looming senatorial primary and the fact I’ve been opposing a candidate who made $600,000 from one of our largest advertisers last year, does make me wonder. Strings get pulled in the real world, and politics is hardball, and our program’s effort helped tip the nominating convention, so it’s not impossible that I lost my job in Salt Lake so that somebody else could get a job in Washington.

Lonsberry vocally supported Mike Lee's primary-election opponent, Tim Bridgewater, a businessman and former Chairman of the Utah County Republican Party. The Bridgewater Campaign subsequently pulled all its ads from radio station KNRS.

Over a thousand reader comments on Lonsberry's weekday blog supported restoring Lonsberry to his position (bringbobbacktoutah.com). Lonsberry returned to the Utah airwaves in February 2011 on radio station KLO 1430AM.

On December 20, 2011, Lonsberry announced that he was doing his last morning broadcast on KLO due to an upcoming schedule change at WHAM. He no longer broadcasts in the Utah radio market.

While the content of Lonsberry's Rochester and Salt Lake City shows was politically and socially conservative, his approach in the two broadcast markets differed due to local content and interests. The former Salt Lake City show was more genteel, with frequent religious references, whereas the Rochester show is more raucous and occasionally risqué. (On the WHAM show, Lonsberry frequently mentions his affinity for women's breasts.) He broadcasts his Rochester show from the WHAM studio, although he occasionally originates the program from his home.

In November 2019, Lonsberry said use of the word “boomer” was a slur comparable to the word "nigger", which provoked a strong response from critics. Lonsberry's comments were in response to use of the phrase "OK boomer" by Generation Z and millennials to show their disdain those of the baby boom generation. Dictionary.com chimed in on the controversy, noting that "Boomer is an informal noun referring to a person born during a baby boom, especially one born in the U.S. between 1946 and 1965" and "The n-word is one of the most offensive words in the English language."

In April 2022, he was fact-checked after starting a debunked rumor on social media that a New York school district was putting litter boxes in bathrooms for students who identify as cats, sometimes known as "furries".

In October 2023, Lonsberry revealed that he received a permanent ban from Twitter.

== Author ==
Lonsberry is a former columnist for the Rochester Times-Union. He currently writes a weekday column published on his own website. He has also been published in The Washington Times.

Lonsberry has authored five books:

- A Various Language (ISBN 1-59955-007-5)
- Baghdad Christmas (ISBN 1-55517-971-1)
- Hopiland Christmas (ISBN 1-59955-069-5)
- Santa Monica Christmas (ISBN 1613647700).
- A Joseph Avenue Christmas (ISBN 1934537446)

== Religion ==
Lonsberry was a missionary for the Church of Jesus Christ of Latter-day Saints (LDS Church) on the Navajo and Hopi reservations in the American Southwest. He was excommunicated from the church before 2001, for what he characterized as "bad conduct". He continued to discuss religious topics on his WHAM show, though less often than on KNRS, and still considers himself an adherent of Mormonism. He has written in defense of the veracity of the Book of Mormon and of Mormonism's place in broader Christianity. Lonsberry avoids publicly discussing his former membership status in the LDS Church but has often discussed topics related to the church during his radio shows. These religious discussions were frequent on the former Salt Lake City show but are discussed much less often with the Rochester and Syracuse area audiences.

As of 2019, Lonsberry's Twitter bio states that he has since reconciled with and rejoined the LDS Church.
