= Five Star Bank Plaza =

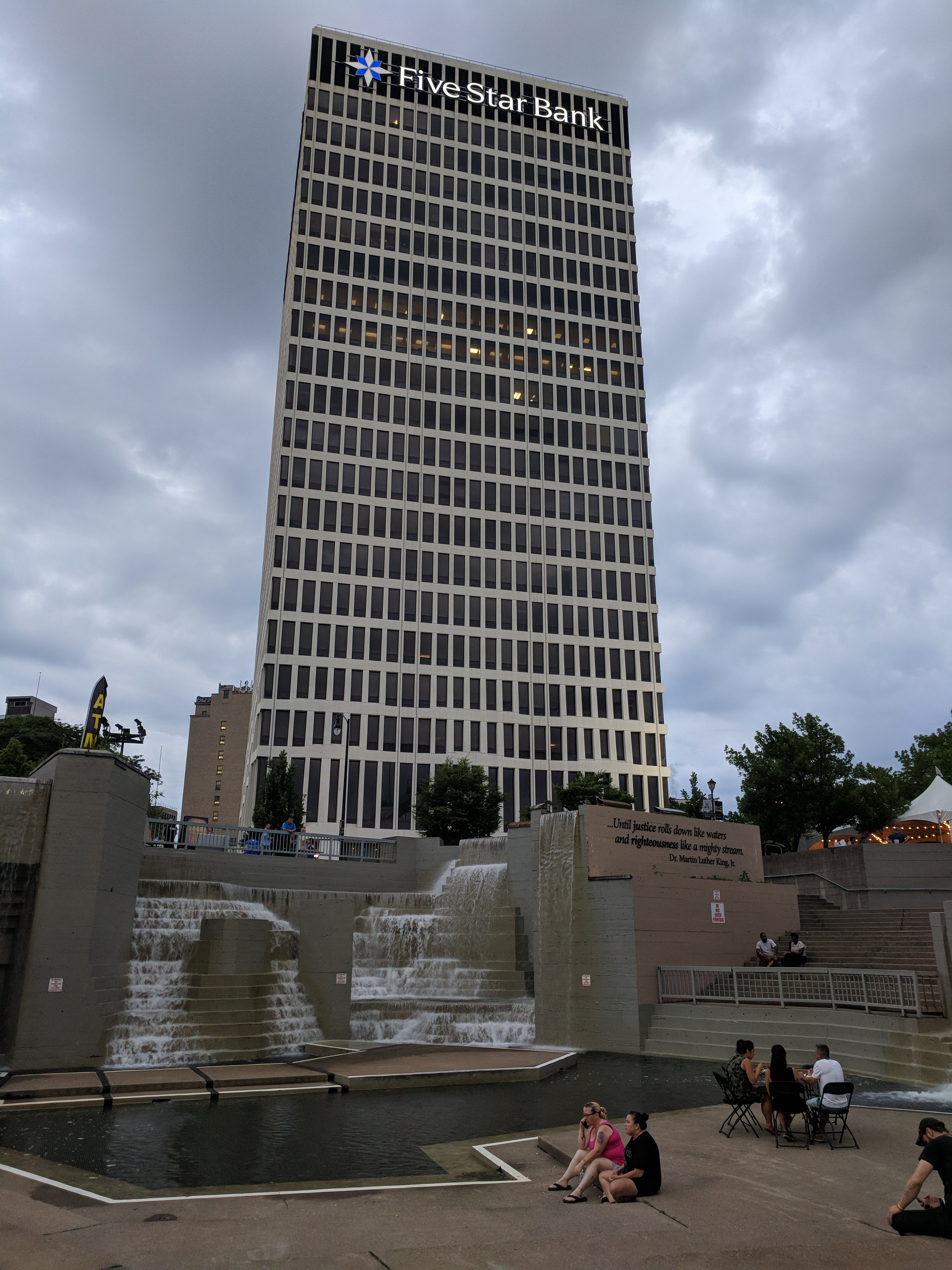

- Location within New York
- Former names: Marine Midland Plaza (1997-1999), One HSBC Plaza (1999-2016)

General information
- Status: Completed
- Type: Office
- Location: 100 Chestnut Street, Rochester, NY, United States
- Coordinates: 43.1548°N 77.6022°W
- Completed: July 10, 1969
- Opening: April 15, 1970
- Renovated: 1999

Height
- Roof: 284 ft (87 m)

Technical details
- Floor count: 21

Design and construction
- Architect: Skidmore, Owings & Merrill LLP
- Structural engineer: Bruce Graham and Fazlur Rahman Khan

Five Star Bank Plaza is a high-rise building located in Rochester, New York, United States, designed by Skidmore, Owings & Merrill. It is the sixth tallest building in Rochester and was originally built as Marine Midland Plaza. Site preparation work started December 1967, with groundbreaking on February 5, 1968. Standing at 284 feet (87 m) with 21 floors, the building was topped out on July 10, 1969 and opening day was April 15, 1970. Tishman Realty & Construction, who built the Original World Trade Center Complex, were the builders. The building was renovated in 1999. It has 560 parking spaces and 380,000 square feet (35,000 m^{2}) of gross building area; 351,400 of it being usable.

The iHeartMedia radio stations 95.1 WAIO, 100.5 WDVI, 1180 WHAM, 1280 WHTK, 107.3 WNBL, 106.7 WKGS and 102.3 WVOR broadcast from studios located on the 16th floor of the tower. Five Star Bank moved its regional headquarters to Rochester in 2016. Five Star Bank will lease three floors for ten years. Marine Midland was re-branded as HSBC in 1999 as part of HSBC's global re-branding, thus renaming the plaza One HSBC Plaza. HSBC Bank USA moved out of the plaza several years later. They sold the branch to First Niagara Bank in 2012 then later consolidated with another branch nearby. Five Star Bank opened a branch in the Plaza on the building's first floor, as had been done with each bank.

The building lights up certain offices with red lights to display a Christmas tree during the holiday season. Large illuminated lettering bearing the name and logo of Five Star Bank was added to the top of the building when the building changed names to Five Star Bank Plaza (whose branch is respectively located at One Five Star Bank Plaza).

== See also ==
- List of tallest buildings in Rochester, New York
