= WKGS =

- Irondequoit, New York; United States
- Broadcast area: Rochester, New York
- Frequency: 106.7 MHz (HD Radio)
- Branding: KISS 106-7

Programming
- Format: Contemporary hit radio
- Subchannels: HD2: "iHeart2010s" 2010s Pop Hits
- Affiliations: Premiere Networks

Ownership
- Owner: iHeartMedia; (iHM Licenses, LLC)
- Sister stations: WAIO, WDVI, WHAM, WHTK, WNBL, WVOR

History
- First air date: 1992; 34 years ago
- Former call signs: WQHJ (1990); WOSB (1990–1992); WMAX-FM (1992–1998); WYSY (1998–1999)
- Call sign meaning: "Kiss"

Technical information
- Licensing authority: FCC
- Facility ID: 3205
- Class: A
- ERP: 4,600 watts vertical; 4,510 watts horizontal
- HAAT: 114 meters (374 ft)
- Transmitter coordinates: 43°13′48″N 77°58′50″W

Links
- Public license information: Public file; LMS
- Webcast: Listen live (via iHeartRadio)
- Website: kiss1067.iheart.com

WKGS (106.7 FM) – branded "KISS 106-7" – is a rhythmic-leaning contemporary hit radio station licensed to Irondequoit, New York, and serves the Rochester area. The iHeartMedia outlet broadcasts with 4,600 watts effective radiated power. Its studios are located at the Five Star Bank Plaza building in downtown Rochester, and its transmitter site is in Brighton.

WKGS broadcasts in the HD Radio format. The station's HD2 subchannel is known as "iHeart2010s" playing all-2010s Pop Hits.

== History ==
=== Early years ===
The 106.7 frequency was one of the first "Docket 80-90" drop-in FM channels to sign on in the Rochester market. A construction permit for the channel was granted to Auburn Cablevision of Auburn, New York in 1990, initially under the calls WQHJ and then WOSB. New calls WMAX-FM were granted on March 5, 1992, and the station signed on shortly thereafter from studios at 412 State Street in Rochester and a transmitter atop the Seneca Towers apartment building on Seth Green Drive in Rochester.

WMAX-FM was the first Adult album alternative station in the market, quickly developing a cult following despite limited signal reach in the outlying suburbs.

In 1996, Auburn Cablevision purchased WLKA (102.3) in Canandaigua, New York, converting the station to a simulcast of WMAX-FM as "106.7 and 102.3 the Max" and extending the format's reach into the southeastern Rochester suburbs and northern Finger Lakes region. WLKA changed calls to WMHX on February 19, 1996.

In 1997, Auburn Cablevision sold WMAX-FM, WMHX and sister station WRCD to Jacor Communications (which was soon absorbed by Clear Channel Communications, now known as iHeartMedia), which moved the station to its studios in Rochester's Midtown Plaza.

On February 18, 1998, "The Max" was replaced with an automated soft adult contemporary format known as "Sunny." On March 1, 1998, WMAX-FM changed call letters to WYSY, with WMHX becoming WISY. (The WMAX-FM call letters were moved to the former WRCD on 107.3.)

=== Kiss 107/Kiss 106-7 ===
While "Sunny" continued on 102.3 (known later as WVOR), 106.7 changed format again on May 1, 1999, becoming WKGS and picking up the "Kiss 107" Top 40 (CHR) format that had been heard on 107.3. While most airshifts were either automated or voicetracked from other Clear Channel stations, WKGS did eventually add a local morning show featuring Erick "E-Man" Andersen, formerly of sister station WNVE which was canceled in May 2009 when Andersen was laid off. Andersen's show has been since replaced with the syndicated Elvis Duran show.

In March 2011, WKGS was placed on Mediabase's CHR/Rhythmic panel, as the station has phased out most of the non-Rhythmic product to take on Urban contemporary rival WDKX. Most pop/rock content moved to sister station WDVI, which returned to Hot AC from AAA by June 2011.

On August 26, 2012, WKGS adopted a new logo and slogan.
