= WBZA =

Rochester, New York; United States
- Broadcast area: Rochester metro area
- Frequency: 98.9 MHz (HD Radio)
- Branding: 98-9 The Buzz

Programming
- Format: Adult hits
- Subchannels: HD2: Family Life Network (Contemporary Christian)

Ownership
- Owner: Audacy, Inc.; (Audacy License, LLC)
- Sister stations: WBEE-FM; WCMF-FM; WPXY-FM; WROC

History
- First air date: 1942; 84 years ago
- Former call signs: W51R (1942-43); WHFM (1943–85); WZKC (1985–86); WKLX (1986–98); WBBF (1998–2000)
- Former frequencies: 45.1 MHz (1942-47)
- Call sign meaning: "The Buzz" (branding)

Technical information
- Licensing authority: FCC
- Facility ID: 71204
- Class: B
- ERP: 37,000 watts
- HAAT: 172 meters (564 ft)
- Transmitter coordinates: 43.171°N 77.673°W
- Translator: HD2: 94.7 W234AZ (Brighton)

Links
- Public license information: Public file; LMS
- Webcast: Listen live (via Audacy)
- Website: www.audacy.com/rochesterbuzz

WBZA (98.9 FM) is a commercial radio station in Rochester, New York. It airs an adult hits format and is owned by Audacy, Inc., based at the High Falls Studios, on Commercial Street and State Street in downtown Rochester.

WBZA has an effective radiated power (ERP) of 37,000 watts. The transmitter tower is on Ferrano Street near W Street, on Rochester's west side. WBZA broadcasts using HD Radio technology. The HD2 digital subchannel carries the Family Life Network playing Contemporary Christian music.

== History ==
=== Experimental years ===
The 98.9 frequency in Rochester has been in continuous use since 1947. Before signing on at its current frequency, the direct predecessor of WBZA, then known as WHFM, broadcast in the old 42-50 MHz FM band. It was founded as a sister station to WHAM 1180 AM by Stromberg-Carlson, a maker of early radio equipment based in Rochester.

The station's operation dates back to 1939 as experimental facility W51R, making it one of the oldest surviving FM stations in the United States. In their early years, the AM and FM stations mostly simulcast. In the late 1960s, the FM station began separate programming.

=== Country, Top 40, oldies ===
WHFM aired an automated Top 40 sound, and by the 1970s, it added live DJs. In early 1985, the call sign changed to WZKC, and the format switched to country music. In the summer of 1986, both format and call letters were changed again, with WKLX adopting a classic hits format, primarily rock songs from the mid-1960s to the mid-1970s.

In April 1988, the format was changed to "classic oldies" playing pop hits from the mid-1950s to early 1970s. At the same time, the transmitter site was relocated into the city of Rochester. It took the WBBF call sign in 1998. The original WBBF 950 AM (now WROC) was a popular Top 40 station in the 1960s and 70s.

=== Audacy ownership ===
In 1999, Entercom Broadcasting purchased the station from Sinclair Broadcasting. (Entercom changed its name to Audacy in 2021.) In November 2000, Entercom moved WBBF's intellectual property to its sister station at 93.3 FM (now WFKL). At that point, 98.9 flipped to all-80s hits as "The Buzz". This continued until 2004, when it shifted to classic rock, while retaining the "Buzz" moniker. With the demise of active rock station 107.3 WNVE in 2007, WBZA shifted from classic rock to mainstream rock. This was roughly the same time when Entercom purchased classic rock station WCMF-FM 96.5 from CBS Radio.

In 2014, Entercom shifted WBZA to adult hits. The slogan switched from "All Kinds of Rock" to "Playing Everything, All the Time".

=== Morning shows ===
The Kimberly & Beck show, hosted by Kimberly Rae and Barry Beck, aired in morning drive time until 2014. The duo were fired after making controversial comments about transgender people. The duo moved to 95.1 WAIO later in 2014. (They were fired from that station in 2020 after making controversial comments.)

Since September 2014, the Spezzano & Sandy show has aired in mornings on WBZA, hosted by Scott Spezzano and Sandy Waters. The show previously were heard for 25 years on Top 40 sister station 97.9 WPXY.

=== Call sign history ===
The WBZA call sign had been used in Boston, simulcast with WBZ. The station was established in 1924. The call sign was switched with the original station in Springfield, Massachusetts, in 1931, which carried a simulcast of the original WBZ until it went dark in 1962.

Following the closure of WBZA in Springfield, the call letters were assigned to an AM station in Glens Falls, New York. That incarnation of WBZA broadcast on 1410 kHz with 1,000 watts of power. The station had signed on in 1959 with the call letters WSET.
