= WHAM (AM) =

Clear-channel AM radio station in Rochester, New York

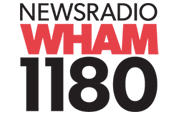
- Rochester, New York; United States
- Broadcast area: Rochester metropolitan area
- Frequency: 1180 kHz
- Branding: NewsRadio WHAM 1180

Programming
- Format: News/talk
- Affiliations: Fox News Radio; Compass Media Networks; Premiere Networks; Westwood One; Syracuse Sports Network

Ownership
- Owner: iHeartMedia; (iHM Licenses, LLC)
- Sister stations: WAIO; WDVI; WHTK; WKGS; WNBL; WVOR

History
- First air date: July 11, 1922
- Former frequencies: 1080 kHz (1922–1928); 1150 kHz (1928–1941)
- Call sign meaning: The onomatopoeia wham

Technical information
- Licensing authority: FCC
- Facility ID: 37545
- Class: A
- Power: 50,000 watts unlimited
- Transmitter coordinates: 43°4′55″N 77°43′30″W; 43°5′51″N 77°35′1″W (aux)
- Translator: 96.1 W241DG (Rochester)
- Repeater: 95.1 WAIO-HD2 (Honeoye Falls)

Links
- Public license information: Public file; LMS
- Webcast: Listen live (via iHeartRadio)
- Website: wham1180.iheart.com

WHAM (1180 kHz) is a commercial clear channel AM radio station in Rochester, New York, United States. It is owned by iHeartMedia and airs a news/talk radio format. The studios and offices are at Five Star Bank Plaza in downtown Rochester.

Its 50,000-watt non-directional transmitter, located in Chili, New York, operates the maximum power for commercial AM stations in the United States and Canada. During the day, it provides at least secondary coverage to all of Western New York, including Buffalo. It can also be heard in much of Southern Ontario, including Toronto, Peterborough, and Kingston. At night, WHAM can be received across much of the Eastern United States and Eastern Canada with a good radio. It is the Emergency Alert System's primary entry point station for Western New York.

== Programming ==
WHAM carries two local news blocks on weekdays: The WHAM Morning News and The WHAM 5 O'Clock NewsHour. The local talk show is Bob Lonsberry. The rest of the weekday schedule is nationally syndicated talk shows, mostly from co-owned Premiere Networks: The Clay Travis and Buck Sexton Show, Sean Hannity and Coast to Coast AM with George Noory. In addition, WHAM carries Mark Levin from Westwood One and Joe Pags, who is based at co-owned WOAI in San Antonio. The station also carries Syracuse Orange men's basketball from the Syracuse Sports Network.

Weekend programming includes shows on money, health, home repair, cars, technology and law. Weekend hosts include Bill Cunningham, The News Junkie, and some brokered programming.

== History ==
=== University of Rochester ===
The station first signed on the air on July 11, 1922. While not the first station to be licensed to the Rochester market (that distinction belongs to the defunct WHQ), it is the oldest surviving station in the area.

Industrialist George Eastman, the founder of the Rochester-based Eastman Kodak Company, helped the University of Rochester launch the station and thought the "WHAM" name would prove to be a clever marketing tool. Jim Barney helped the university get the station on the air. The station in its early days operated from makeshift studios at the Eastman Theatre.

=== Stromberg-Carlson ===
In 1927, WHAM was acquired by Stromberg-Carlson, a maker of radio and telecommunications equipment then based in Rochester. The company expanded the station's operations and boosted its signal to 5,000 watts shortly after the acquisition.

It was relocated from 1080 to 1150 kHz in the overall national reorganization of the AM radio band by the Federal Radio Commission in 1928. In 1933, WHAM was allowed to increase power to 25,000 watts. A ceremony marking the event included a three-hour broadcast from the Eastman Theatre with "a galaxy of stars" participating. It later got a boost to its current 50,000 watt level. The station was part of the NBC Red Network.

In the North American Regional Broadcasting Agreement (NARBA), the AM band was shuffled in March 1941. WHAM changed frequency once more to its current 1180 kHz.

=== Rochester Radio City ===
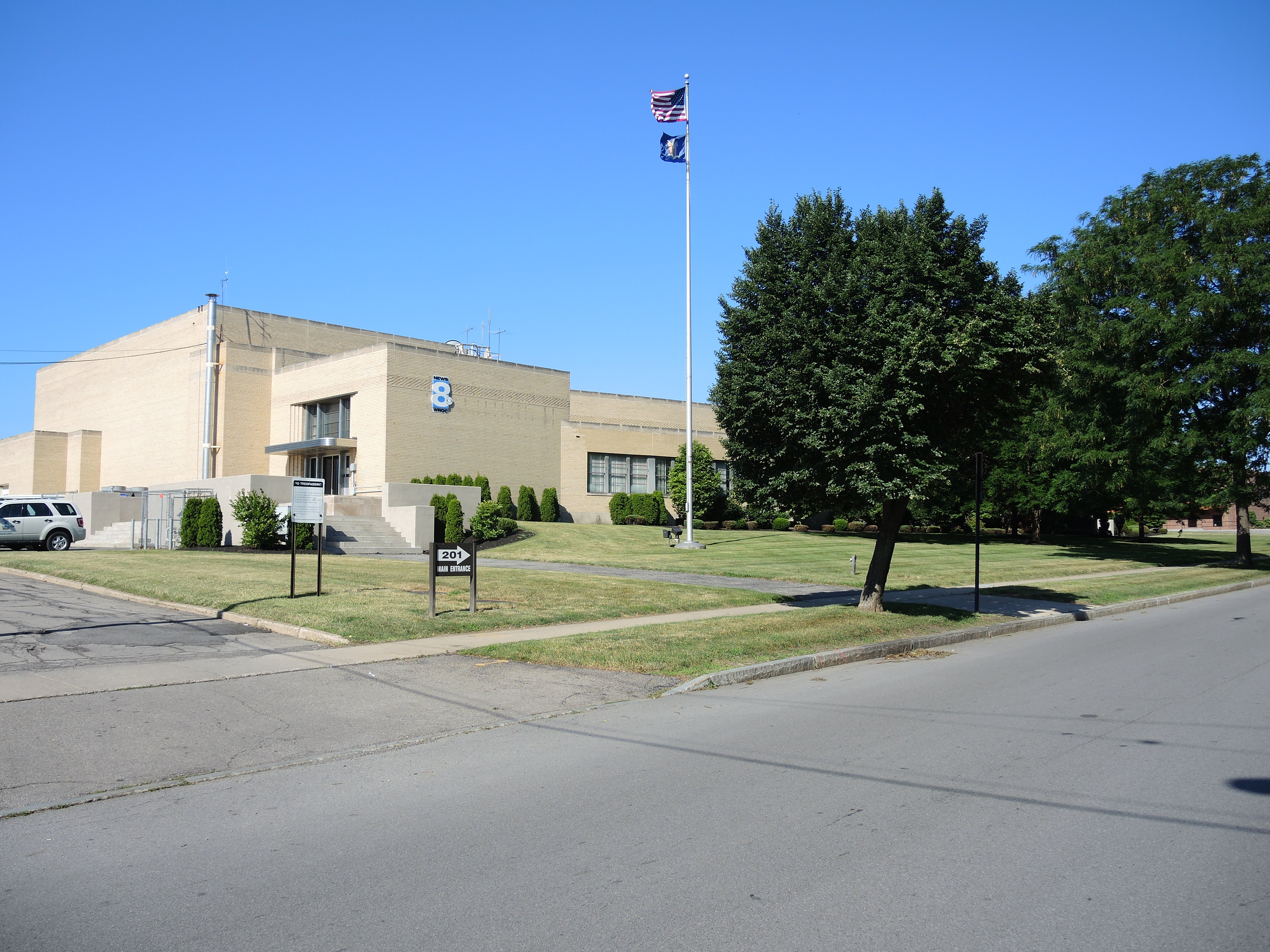
Rochester Radio City, now the headquarters for WROC-TV

In February 1948, WHAM and its FM sister station, WHFM (now WBZA), moved into a new facility, Rochester Radio City. The building included 24 offices and six studios, the largest of which could accommodate 400 people in the audience.

One of the reasons for the construction of Rochester Radio City was the eventual launch of a WHAM televiion station. That would happen in 1949 when WHAM put the city's first station on the air, WHAM-TV, a NBC affiliate, originally on Channel 6 in 1949, then Channel 5 by 1954. That station is now WROC-TV Channel 8, the area's CBS affiliate. Stromberg-Carlson merged with General Dynamics in 1955. General Dynamics was not interested in owning broadcast outlets, and put the WHAM radio and television outlets on the market. In 1956, WHAM-TV was sold to Transcontinent Broadcasting, which owned WGR radio and WGR-TV in Buffalo; the new owners changed the call sign to the current WROC-TV. WHAM and WHFM-FM were sold to William Rust and its studios were moved to facilities on East Avenue.

=== Later history ===
In 1985, Lee Rust sold WHAM to Lincoln Group, which already owned WVOR in Rochester and the station's studios were moved to Midtown Plaza. WHFM was sold to separate ownership. American Radio Systems bought Lincoln Group in 1996, but under a Justice Department consent decree, it was required to sell WHAM, WVOR, and WNVE to a separate owner. The stations were thus sold to Jacor and WHTK was included in the deal as well. Jacor was later acquired by Clear Channel Communications.

In 2005, the area's ABC affiliate, WOKR, changed its call sign to WHAM-TV. Clear Channel Communications (now known as iHeartMedia), already the owner of WHAM radio, owned WOKR/WHAM-TV from 2002 until the sale of its entire television group to Newport Television (controlled by Providence Equity Partners) in 2007; the two stations still have a news partnership. In 2008, WHAM moved to its current studio location when Midtown Plaza was demolished.

=== Controversy ===
WHAM radio host Bob Lonsberry has often been the source of controversy, due to his on-air remarks. He was fired from his show in 2003, but was later brought back due to boycotts by aggrieved fans.

News articles were circulated about him comparing a derogatory racial reference to the term "Boomers" - a colloquial reference for people born during the Baby Boom.

Lonsberry also hosts a show earlier in the day on co-owned WGY (810 AM and 103.1 FM) in Albany, New York and later in the day on co-owned WSYR (570 AM and 106.9 FM) in Syracuse.
