= WDVI =

Country radio station in Rochester, New York

Rochester, New York; United States
- Broadcast area: Rochester metropolitan area
- Frequency: 100.5 MHz (HD Radio)
- Branding: Country 100.5

Programming
- Format: Country
- Subchannels: HD3: Lite Rock (adult contemporary)
- Affiliations: Premiere Networks

Ownership
- Owner: iHeartMedia; (iHM Licenses, LLC)
- Sister stations: WAIO, WHAM, WHTK, WKGS, WNBL, WVOR

History
- First air date: 1963; 63 years ago
- Former call signs: WVOR (1963–1979); WVOR-FM (1979–2006)
- Former frequencies: 92.5 MHz (1963–1964)
- Call sign meaning: "Drive" (callsign transposed, former branding)

Technical information
- Licensing authority: FCC
- Facility ID: 37546
- Class: B
- ERP: 50,000 watts
- HAAT: 146 meters (479 ft)
- Transmitter coordinates: 43°2′1.00″N 77°25′18.00″W

Links
- Public license information: Public file; LMS
- Webcast: Listen Live; HD3: Listen Live (HD3)
- Website: country1005.iheart.com

WDVI (100.5 FM) is a country music radio station in Rochester, New York. The station is owned and operated by iHeartMedia. Its studios are located at the Five Star Bank Plaza building in downtown Rochester, and its transmitter site is in Victor, New York.

Monday through Saturday mornings, WDVI runs The Bobby Bones Show, based in Nashville, from Premiere Networks, a subsidiary of iHeartMedia.

== History ==
The station was previously known as WVOR-FM, a hot adult contemporary music station for many years. The station was owned by the Lincoln Group before being sold to American Radio Systems (ARS), a forerunner of CBS Radio. ARS was forced to sell the station to Jacor to meet Federal Communications Commission (FCC) ownership restrictions. Jacor would later be absorbed by Clear Channel (now iHeartMedia).

WVOR-FM rebranded from "Mix 100.5" to "The Drive" in 2006, leaning its direction towards Adult album alternative, and changed its callsign to WDVI; the WVOR calls would be placed on sister station WISY, in nearby Canandaigua. The station remained a Mediabase hot adult contemporary reporter, however. The AAA lean was dropped in 2012.

On June 30, 2017, at 5 p.m., WDVI returned to its previous brand as "Mix 100.5". It shifted to adult contemporary on August 3, 2020, while keeping the "Mix" branding.

On October 25, 2021, at 9 a.m., after playing "Drift Away" by Uncle Kracker featuring Dobie Gray, WDVI flipped to country, branded as "Country 100.5", with the first song being "Famous Friends" by Chris Young and Kane Brown. Along with the format change, the station brought in Jeremy Newman, the popular former morning show host from rival station WBEE-FM, to host middays, and the syndicated Bobby Bones morning show was moved to the station from sister station WNBL, however, it remained being simulcast on WNBL until July 1, 2022, when it flipped to all '80s hits.
