= WRMM-FM =

Radio station in Rochester, New York

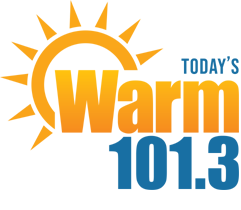
- Rochester, New York; United States
- Frequency: 101.3 MHz
- Branding: Today's Warm 101.3

Programming
- Format: Adult contemporary

Ownership
- Owner: Stephens Media Group; (Stephens Media Group - Rochester, LLC)
- Sister stations: WZNE; WFKL

History
- First air date: November 14, 1966
- Former call signs: WNYR-FM (1966−1971); WEZO (1971–1988); WRMM (1988–1990)
- Call sign meaning: "Warm"

Technical information
- Licensing authority: FCC
- Facility ID: 1907
- Class: B
- ERP: 27,000 watts
- HAAT: 195 meters (640 ft)
- Transmitter coordinates: 43°10′13.2″N 77°40′22″W

Links
- Public license information: Public file; LMS
- Webcast: Listen live
- Website: www.warm1013.com

WRMM-FM (101.3 FM) is a radio station in Rochester, New York, United States, broadcasting an adult contemporary format. The station is owned by Stephens Media Group. Its studios are located at the First Federal Plaza building in downtown Rochester, and its transmitter site is in Rochester's west side.

== History ==
Historically, the station was the sister station of AM 680/990, which is now WDCX. Then-WRNY signed on an FM signal at 97.7 in the early 1950s but shut it down in 1955. Eleven years later, the same station, now known as WNYR, signed a new FM signal at its current location, at which it has broadcast ever since. Prior to 1988, WRMM was known as WEZO and had an easy listening (Bonneville) format, and prior to that a country format as WNYR-FM. AM 990 and WRMM were separated in 1996; WRMM was sold to CBS Radio and AM 990 to Crawford Broadcasting.

Entercom Communications acquired the station from CBS Radio on November 30, 2007. However, because Entercom's acquisition of CBS's Rochester radio cluster exceeded the Federal Communications Commission's single-market limit on radio station ownership, Entercom put WRMM, along with WZNE and WFKL, back on the market. In May 2008, Stephens Media Group took over ownership of WRMM.
