= WROC (AM) =

- Rochester, New York; United States
- Broadcast area: Rochester metro area
- Frequency: 950 kHz
- Branding: WGR Rochester 95.7FM & 950AM

Programming
- Language: English
- Format: Sports radio
- Affiliations: WGR; Westwood One Sports; Buffalo Sabres; Rochester Americans

Ownership
- Owner: Audacy, Inc.; (Audacy License, LLC)
- Sister stations: WGR; WBEE-FM; WBZA; WCMF-FM; WPXY-FM

History
- First air date: 1947
- Former call signs: WARC (1947–53); WBBF (1953–98); WEZO (1998–2000); WBBF (2000–02)
- Call sign meaning: Rochester or referring to WROC-TV

Technical information
- Licensing authority: FCC
- Facility ID: 71205
- Class: B
- Power: 1,000 watts
- Transmitter coordinates: 43°6′25.2″N 77°35′50″W
- Translators: 95.7 W239BF (Rochester, relays WBEE-FM HD2)
- Repeater: 92.5 WBEE-FM HD2 (Rochester)

Links
- Public license information: Public file; LMS
- Webcast: Listen live (via Audacy)
- Website: www.audacy.com/thefanrochester

WROC (950 kHz), branded as WGR Rochester, is an AM radio station licensed to Rochester, New York, airing a sports radio format. The format is closely aligned with Buffalo sister station WGR, and carries local shows as well as content from WGR, Westwood One Sports, along with play-by-play from the Rochester Americans. The station's studios are located at High Falls Studios downtown, and its transmitter tower is on Rochester's southside near the I-390/I-590 freeway interchange.

The station's call sign is a reference to WROC-TV; while the stations are not and have never been co-owned, WROC radio has an agreement with WROC-TV to provide local news coverage, and the borrowing of the WROC call sign from WROC-TV is included in this agreement. (The WROC call sign was previously used on 1280 kHz, now WHTK, which was originally co-owned with WROC-TV.)

== History ==
WROC began broadcasting in 1947 under the callsign WARC. It was an early affiliate of the ABC radio network, but later changed to a locally programmed, personality-driven popular music station. It was purchased by the B. Forman regional department store chain in 1953 and changed its callsign to WBBF, the last three letters of which stood for "Buy B. Forman". In 1966 it was sold to LIN Broadcasting for what was then a market record of over $2 million, but retained its popular music format and personality lineup until the early 1980s.

As WBBF, 950 AM was a popular top 40 music station in Rochester, often leading the market in ratings surveys from the 1950s through the early 1970s, and ranking among the city's top stations through the late 1970s even after strong format competition arrived in 1972 from WAXC and later on the FM band from WPXY. Consistent success was achieved although as a relative latecomer to the AM band in the postwar era, WBBF's coverage area had to be restricted to the east and west to prevent interference with other stations on the same frequency (WWJ in Detroit and WIBX in Utica).

In 1982, as hit music radio listeners were migrating to FM, the station evolved into a talk format. WBBF remained a talk station through the mid-1980s, then switched to an oldies format. Then in 1987, it became a classic country station. As WBBF and later WEZO, from 1990 to 2000, the station carried an adult standards format. The WROC call sign was adopted in 2002 when the station adopted a second-tier conservative talk format featuring The Laura Ingraham Show and The Radio Factor; the station switched to progressive talk radio upon the launch of Air America Radio in 2004, a format it held until 2008, when it adopted its current sports format. The WBBF calls are now in use in Buffalo, New York.

On September 2, 2008, WROC affiliated with ESPN Radio and was branded "ESPN Rochester". On December 8, 2021, the station was rebranded as "95.7 The Fan", replacing ESPN content with content from Audacy-owned networks BetQL and CBS Sports Radio. Local programming on the station remained unchanged. WROC was rebranded "WGR Rochester" at 11 p.m. on February 22, 2026, and replaced most Westwood One Sports programming with a simulcast of Buffalo sister station WGR; the station breaks away from the simulcast in early afternoons for its locally-produced show, The Sports Bar hosted by Gene Battaglia, which had aired in afternoon drive before the change.

== Programming ==
Aside from sports play-by-play, WROC runs a straight feed of sister station WGR outside of The Sports Bar with Gene Battaglia on weekdays and Rochester Americans games. With the shift to the WGR brand, the station airs WGR programs Schopp and the Bulldog Jeremy White and Joe DiBiasi in the morning and Sal Capaccio in early middays. Schopp and Bulldog previously aired on WROC from 2008 to 2011, but was dropped in summer 2011 without explanation.

WROC carries the Buffalo Sabres which is also carried on WCMF-FM to improve the reach. In January 2012, it was announced that WROC would be the AM home of the Buffalo Bills (WCMF-FM is the corresponding FM home). The Bills left WROC, WCMF and WGR after the 2025 season. WROC entered into an agreement to carry the Rochester Americans, the Sabres' AHL affiliate, starting in 2016. WROC was the exclusive radio home of the Rochester Knighthawks until the team moved its broadcasts to WNBL.
