= WCMF-FM =

- Rochester, New York; United States
- Broadcast area: Rochester metro area
- Frequency: 96.5 MHz (HD Radio)
- Branding: 96.5 WCMF

Programming
- Language: English
- Format: Classic rock
- Affiliations: Sabres Hockey Network

Ownership
- Owner: Audacy, Inc.; (Audacy License, LLC)
- Sister stations: WBEE-FM; WBZA; WPXY-FM; WROC

History
- First air date: June 9, 1960
- Former call signs: WCMF (1960–1993)
- Call sign meaning: Community Music Federation

Technical information
- Licensing authority: FCC
- Facility ID: 1905
- Class: B
- ERP: 48,000 watts
- HAAT: 142 meters (466 ft)
- Transmitter coordinates: 43.135°N 77.585°W

Links
- Public license information: Public file; LMS
- Webcast: Listen live (via Audacy)
- Website: www.audacy.com/wcmf

WCMF-FM (96.5 MHz) is a radio station located in the Rochester, New York, area. Its transmitter is located on Pinnacle Hill in Brighton, Monroe County, while its studios are located at High Falls Studios in downtown Rochester.

WCMF is a heritage classic rock station in the Rochester area.

== History ==
WCMF was originally owned by Community Music Service, Inc., hence the "CM" in its call letters. In 1968, the station was owned by a handful of Rochester locals. Several were engineers at General Dynamics, including a lawyer from Harris Beech Wilcox. The station had a mish-mash of formats from Candlelight & Wine in the morning hosted by Bill Rund, to hard underground rock hosted by Bob Drake (Francati). On Friday evening, a local attorney hosted a very popular jazz show. The owners were not broadcasters and the station was searching for identity. In 1968, the format was flipped into R&B from 6 a.m. to 3 p.m. and underground rock from 3 p.m. to sign off at midnight.

The station later flipped to album-oriented rock, then to classic rock. WCMF's major claim to fame from the late 1980s until the late 2000s was its highly rated morning show The Brother Wease Morning Circus, hosted by Alan Levin, better known as Brother Wease, who was joined over the years by various co-hosts who later went on to national radio success including Stephanie Miller who was known as Sister Sleaze on the show, and Gregg Hughes better known by his radio name Opie who started in the promotions department at the station. Levin was forced out of that show and the station in January 2008 when his contract ran out as the station was being sold from CBS Radio to Entercom Communications. Levin and officials from station owner Entercom Communications tried but failed to negotiate a new contract. His co-hosts remained and took over the show, which was renamed The Break Room and continues today, and Levin moved to WAIO, where he started a new morning show that he hosted until 2025.

== Sports progamming ==
WCMF is the Rochester affiliate of the Buffalo Sabres Radio Network. The station previously served as the Rochester affiliate for the Buffalo Bills Radio Network from 2012 to 2025.
