= WDKX =

Urban contemporary radio station in Rochester, New York

Coordinates: 43.155°N 77.604°W

- Rochester, New York; United States
- Broadcast area: Rochester, New York
- Frequency: 103.9 MHz
- Branding: "103.9 WDKX"

Programming
- Format: Urban contemporary
- Affiliations: Premiere Networks

Ownership
- Owner: Andre Langston & Andria B. Langston

History
- First air date: April 6, 1974
- Call sign meaning: W Frederick Douglass; Martin Luther King Jr. Malcolm X

Technical information
- Licensing authority: FCC
- Facility ID: 43540
- Class: A
- ERP: 800 watts
- HAAT: 165 meters

Links
- Public license information: Public file; LMS
- Webcast: Listen Live
- Website: wdkx.com

WDKX (103.9 FM) is an independently Black-owned urban contemporary radio station that broadcasts from Rochester, New York at 800 watts of effective radiated power. The station's studios are located east of downtown Rochester along Main Street, and the transmitter tower is located atop Xerox Tower in downtown. WDKX chose its call letters to honor Black heroes ("D" for Frederick Douglass, "K" for Martin Luther King Jr., and "X" for Malcolm X).

Monroe County Broadcasting Co., LTD. formed a corporation in 1968 to compete for the available FM frequency 103.9 in Monroe County, New York. WDKX commenced broadcasting at 5:30 a.m. on April 6, 1974. WDKX has been under the same ownership since its inception. Andrew A. Langston, founder and former owner and general manager of WDKX, received the "Rochester Radio Broadcaster of the Year" Award, the National Association of Black Owned Broadcasters "Pioneer" Award, and was inducted to the "New York State Broadcasters Hall of Fame" inaugural class.

The station currently places first in Nielsen ratings of 18-34 and 25-54 listeners, both urban and suburban, and has ranked second overall in the Rochester market behind WBEE-FM in recent ratings surveys.

The station has a wide-ranging playlist, ranging from Old School R&B and Classic Hip Hop to today's R&B and Hip Hop. WDKX also plays some Dancehall, Afro beats, Jazz, Pop and Dance music.

== History ==
In 1962, Andrew Langston moved his family young wife Gloria Langston and son Andre Langston to Rochester after being offered a job at a local TV station. Upon his arrival, he was quickly turned away once they realized he was Black and did not want him on camera. In order to provide for his family he became an insurance agent, barber, and took a sales job at National Clothing Company. One of his most prominent clients at National Clothing Company was Xerox founder, Joseph Wilson. Wilson and Langston became good friends over time and would talk about a number of topics. One topic being, Langston's dream of starting his own radio station. Due to the poor treatment of Black people, race riots, and lack of proper news coverage Langston wanted to create a vehicle to give the unheard a voice. Wilson believed in Langston's dream and promised him a space atop the Xerox tower, the highest building in Rochester, for his antenna once he solidified ownership of the station. Their agreement was written on a napkin.

In 1968, Langston went to Washington, D.C. to meet with the FCC to apply for his license to broadcast on the available frequency 103.9 MHz. After six years, the new station, christened FM 104 WDKX, commenced broadcasting at 5:30 a.m. on April 6, 1974. Wilson kept his promise and the WDKX antenna was placed on top of the Xerox Tower where it still stands today. Langston chose the call letters DKX with intention, standing for influential Black community leaders – Frederick Douglass, Martin Luther King Jr., and Malcolm X.

Andrew A. Langston, received the "Rochester Radio Broadcaster of the Year" Award, the National Association of Black Owned Broadcasters "Pioneer" Award, and was inducted to the "New York State Broadcasters Hall of Fame" inaugural class for his contributions to the broadcasting industry. He died in 2010.

The station is a key element within the community of Rochester. They are heavily focused on the betterment and empowerment of the community. Through various initiatives like the Back to School Drive, Step Jam, Women 4 Women, and more they are able to work with community leaders to create safe enriching environments for the people of Rochester. WDKX currently broadcasts to over 170,000 listeners throughout Monroe County and employs 30 people in the greater Rochester area. In addition, their reach goes beyond terrestrial airwaves in Rochester reaching millions annually via their digital platforms. WDKX is now owned by Langston's son, Andre Langston and his granddaughter, Andria B. Langston.

== Acknowledgements ==
mentioned on "Super Hoe" Boogie Down Productions Criminal Minded 1987

VH1 Hip Hop Honors 2005

Rochester Music Hall of Fame 2014

Hart of the City 2019
