= WAIO =

Radio station in Honeoye Falls–Rochester, New York

Coordinates: 43.034°N 77.421°W

- Honeoye Falls, New York; United States
- Broadcast area: Rochester metropolitan area
- Frequency: 95.1 MHz (HD Radio)
- Branding: Rock 95.1

Programming
- Format: Active rock
- Subchannels: HD2: News/talk (WHAM simulcast)
- Affiliations: Premiere Networks; Buffalo Bills Radio Network

Ownership
- Owner: iHeartMedia, Inc.; (iHM Licenses, LLC)
- Sister stations: WDVI; WHAM; WHTK; WKGS; WNBL; WVOR

History
- First air date: June 6, 1948 (as WVBT at 101.9)
- Former call signs: WVBT (101.9 Bristol Center, 1948–12/31/1953); WRRE (1/1/1954–6/26/61); WMIV (6/27/61–3/4/1982); WYLF (3/4/1982–7/28/1986); WZSH (7/28/1986–12/26/1991); WRQI (12/26/1991–4/24/1995); WNVE (4/24/1995–7/4/2004); WFXF (7/4/2004–5/10/2012); WQBW (5/10/2012–9/19/2014)
- Former frequencies: 101.9 MHz (1948–1950)
- Call sign meaning: "Radio 95.1" (previous format)

Technical information
- Licensing authority: FCC
- Facility ID: 24958
- Class: B
- ERP: 50,000 watts
- HAAT: 146 meters (479 ft)

Links
- Public license information: Public file; LMS
- Webcast: Listen live (via iHeartRadio)
- Website: rock951.iheart.com

WAIO (95.1 FM, "Rock 95.1") is a commercial radio station licensed to Honeoye Falls, New York, and serving the Rochester metropolitan area. The station airs an active rock radio format and is owned and operated by iHeartMedia. Its studios and offices are located at the Five Star Bank Plaza building in downtown Rochester. The station carries Rover's Morning Glory from WMMS Cleveland in morning drive.

WAIO has an effective radiated power (ERP) of 50,000 watts, the maximum for most of New York. The transmitter is on Baker Road in Victor, New York, amid the towers for other FM radio stations in the area. WAIO broadcasts in the HD Radio hybrid format. Its HD2 digital subchannel simulcasts sister station WHAM 1180 AM, which airs a news/talk format.

== History ==
=== Rural Radio Network/Ivy Network/CBN (1948–1981) ===
The station now known as WAIO signed on June 6, 1948, as WVBT, licensed to Bristol Center, New York and transmitting from Bristol Mountain on 101.9 MHz. It was the next-to-last link in the Rural Radio Network chain of FM stations broadcasting to farmers across upstate New York. WVBT changed call letters to WRRE and changed frequency to 95.1 in 1950. When the Rural Radio Network became the Ivy Network under new owners in 1960, WRRE became WMIV. It would retain those calls under the network's next identity, the Christian Broadcasting Network (CBN), broadcasting religious programming from studios in Ithaca between 1968 and 1981.

=== WYLF/WZSH (1981–1991) ===
With the breakup of the CBN radio operation, each of the former Rural Radio Network stations was sold to separate owners. WMIV was sold to Empire Broadcasting. In early 1982, it changed format to adult standards, becoming one of the first FM affiliates of Al Ham's Music of Your Life syndicated format. On March 4, 1982, WMIV changed calls to WYLF ("Life 95.1"), operating from studios in a converted house on Route 332 in Farmington, New York and later adding a sales office at 213 E. Commercial Street in East Rochester.

In 1985, Empire sold WYLF to Boston broadcasters Ron Frizzell and Arnold Lerner, operating as the "Finger Lakes Wireless Talking Machine Company". On July 28, 1986, WYLF became WZSH ("Wish 95"), moving from adult standards to soft adult contemporary with a format that mimicked Lerner's successful WSSH in the Boston market. WZSH moved its studios from Farmington to the Piano Works office complex in East Rochester and placed a translator, W288AR at 105.5 MHz, on the air from the East Rochester water tower.

=== Rock-It 95 (1991–1995) ===
On December 25, 1991, WZSH became WRQI ("Rock-It 95"), programming a rock format. In February 1993, Rock-It 95 added the syndicated Howard Stern Show to its lineup, bringing the station attention and ratings in the larger Rochester market.

During the WRQI era, the 105.5 translator in East Rochester was replaced with a more powerful 250-watt translator, W238AB at 95.5, operating from the centrally located Pinnacle Hill transmitter site overlooking downtown Rochester. WRQI made several attempts to improve its main signal on 95.1 as well, briefly moving from its historic Bristol Mountain site to a tower in Farmington owned by Rochester Telephone, but was forced to return to Bristol after interference complaints from the tower's neighbors.

=== The Nerve (1995–2004) ===
On April 1, 1995, after an 11-hour stunt of a loop of "The End" by The Doors, WRQI became WNVE ("The Nerve"). Playing off the frequency similarity between the main 95.1 signal and the powerful 95.5 translator, the station frequently identified as "95.1, 95.5 the Nerve," usually spoken quickly by an announcer (an amusing promo bump was recorded featuring Howard Stern producer Gary Dell'Abate, where Gary expresses confusion at the dual-frequencies. "95.1/95.5...? Wait, that's two different stations!"). There was also a bump identifying the translator station ID W238AB that was played occasionally, spoken as quickly as possible. The Nerve's format was originally Modern Rock, featuring music being played by well-known bands such as Nirvana, Pearl Jam, The Smashing Pumpkins, Soundgarden, Live, Stone Temple Pilots, as well as alternative music from lesser-remembered artists such as Poe, Veruca Salt, The Refreshments, The Toadies, and many others.

Howard Stern was broadcast on weekday mornings. Weekday evenings at 5 PM consisted of "The Drive at Five" which was an all-request, call-in hour. This segment was usually introduced by DJ 'E-Man' with The Jon Spencer Blues Explosion's "Right Place Wrong Time" playing. There would also be a segment called "The Five at Nine", where the five most requested songs of the day would be played. Early mainstays at number one on this list were Poe's "Angry Johnny," The Toadies' "Possum Kingdom," Tracy Bonham's "Mother Mother," and others. In the fall of 1996, a shortly lived segment was introduced where the DJ would play two very new songs, usually by relatively unknown artists, back to back. The listeners would then call in and vote on which of the two would be allowed to remain in rotation. The winner would then move on to the next night, although it would already be allowed to remain in rotation even if it lost a later round. An early streak winner on this segment was The Bloodhound Gang's "Fire Water Burn," long before it worked its way into the Five at Nine.

The Nerve would also frequently give out tickets to local concerts featuring artists that were played on the station. Listeners would have to listen for Rage Against the Machine's "Take the Power Back" accompanied by a strange voice instructing them to call in to win.

The modern rock format lasted until New Year's Day 1999, when The Nerve made their "Resolution to Rock." This essentially meant that Classic Rock songs were now entered into rotation. This was a very controversial move because the station formerly aired imaging that would make fun of 'Dinosaur Rock' (with liners saying that 'in the Dinosaur age people used to listen to suck rock like Loverboy and Styx'), and listeners were now disenfranchised to hear these and similar bands now being played. It was at this point that WNVE lost a large portion of its listener base.

Meanwhile, WNVE had moved studios and changed owners. In 1996, it was sold to Jacor Communications (later absorbed by Clear Channel Communications, now known as iHeartMedia), which relocated the studios from East Rochester to the Euclid Building in Midtown Plaza in downtown Rochester, home to its cluster of stations that also included WHAM and WVOR.

The Nerve later would add brief local news reports during station breaks, usually as bumpers around breaks in the morning broadcast of Howard Stern. These news reports were often delivered by Bill Lowe from WHAM, the prominent news and talk AM station. Some degree of humor was derived by hearing the serious baritone voice of Bill Lowe give the station's sign off, "95.1/95.5 The Nerve, 'It Just Rocks.'" Of note, radio personality "JoLo" would host the Saturday Morning Show with e-Man. This was, of course, Joe Lomonaco, host of WHAM's popular "WHAM 5:00 News Hour." For an April Fool's Day joke in the late 1990s, WHAM and WNVE swapped DJs for a few shifts. Mid-day WHAM talkshow host Bob Lonsberry came over to The Nerve and swapped shifts with e-Man, who went over to the newstalk station, much to the amused chagrin of local listeners.

=== The Fox (2004–2012) ===

In February 2004, Howard Stern was dropped from WNVE and other Clear Channel sister stations across the country due to indecency complaints. Stern later struck a deal with Infinity Broadcasting to be carried in nine new cities (including four new stations in markets where Clear Channel dropped his show); Infinity-owned WZNE would pick up Stern that July 19. Without its main ratings draw in the morning, WNVE's ratings fell precipitously. On July 4, 2004, Clear Channel moved WNVE from 95.1 to the lesser Bristol Mountain 107.3 signal. Replacing it on 95.1 was the former 107.3 classic rock format, "The Fox," with new calls WFXF.

While most airshifts were initially automated, "95.1 the Fox" gradually added air personalities, including a voice tracked afternoon shift from Clear Channel Boston DJ Ed McMann.

In 2006, WFXF began broadcasting in HD Radio, adding a subchannel of "Deep Rock" classic rock from the Format Lab.

On November 17, 2008, WFXF began airing the popular radio program hosted by Brother Wease, one of the city's most popular veteran radio personalities who had previously hosted the morning show at crosstown competitor WCMF-FM. Also in 2008, WFXF became a Rochester affiliate (along with sister station WHAM) of the Buffalo Bills regional radio network.

=== The Brew (2012–2014) ===
On April 30, 2012, WFXF rebranded as "95.1 The Brew", with the intent of shifting its playlist to 1970s thru 1980s, and even early 1990s rock, dropping most of the 1960s from its rotation. Wease remained with the station. On May 10, 2012, the station also changed its call sign to WQBW, previously used by Clear Channel in Milwaukee on what is now WRNW.

=== Radio 95.1 (2014–2025) ===
On September 11, 2014, WQBW rebranded as "Radio 95.1", and began shifting to a hot talk format. As part of the change, iHeart brought in Kimberly and Beck, who were recently at WBZA, to host from 2-7 p.m. weekdays after Brother Wease in the morning. These changes were on top of other changes made by Clear Channel to other stations it owned in the Rochester market the same day. The call letters were changed to WAIO on September 19, 2014.

On August 6, 2020, following Kimberly and Beck's earlier dismissal for making racist comments on the air, WAIO debuted "The Big Show" in the same time slot, featuring comedian Earl David Reed along with former iHeartMedia DJs Megan Carter and Pat McMahon. After less than two years, “The Big Show” was let go and WAIO hired Rizzo and Jeff in February 2022. Rizzo and Jeff had worked together at WKHQ in Traverse City, Michigan and WDZH in Detroit, where they partnered up for mornings when Rizzo joined the now disbanded former “Rat and Puff Show”. Before that, Rizzo was on air at WPLJ in New York as a member of the “Todd Show” and Jeff (also known as Rat) was with iHeartMedia at WIOQ in Philadelphia and WFLZ in Tampa. Due to corporate-mandated budget cuts, Rizzo and Jeff were let go in March 2023 and the show moved to WTMT in Asheville, North Carolina.

In 2022, WAIO affiliated with VSiN to provide sports betting talk programming in off-peak time slots. By March 2023, WAIO's weekday schedule consisted of Brother Wease in mornings, DiTullio & Dale in middays, Rizzo & Jeff in afternoons, Rover's Morning Glory in middays and evenings, The Bob & Tom Show and The News Junkie respectively in overnights, and VSiN programming on weekends.

In April 2023, WAIO shifted to a hot talk/active rock hybrid format, while retaining the "Radio" branding. In September 2023, a major schedule shakeup was announced that moved Brother Wease into the late morning and out of the traditional morning time slot his show had held since the 1980s with the first three hours of Rover's Morning Glory replacing it in the 6am to 9am time slot making that show live on WAIO for the first time and live in the Rochester market for the first time since it departed WZNE in 2020. In addition, a new show was added, co-hosted by Bob Lonsberry of sister station WHAM and Jeremy Newman of sister station WDVI-FM in middays with the show formerly occupying that time slot moved to afternoons. WAIO later added The Jesus Christ Show on weekends along the ViSN programming and active rock.

=== Rock 95.1 (2025-present) ===
On September 4, 2025, Brother Wease announced he would retire from radio effective after his show that day to begin a podcast with his son. At 12:07 PM that day, following his retirement program (and after signing off the hot talk format with "Cherry Bomb" by John Mellencamp), WAIO dropped the hot talk portion of its format except for Rover's Morning Glory which expanded to air all 4 hours and switched to active rock, branded as "Rock 95.1"; the first song under the relaunched format was "This Is War" by Thirty Seconds to Mars.

=== Sports programming ===
On July 15, 2016, WAIO was announced as the Rochester affiliate of the Buffalo Bills Radio Network, replacing WCMF-FM.
