= WZNE =

- Brighton, New York; United States
- Broadcast area: Rochester metro area
- Frequency: 94.1 MHz (HD Radio)
- Branding: 94-1 The Zone

Programming
- Format: Alternative rock
- Subchannels: HD2: Indie rock

Ownership
- Owner: Stephens Media Group; (Stephens Media Group Rochester, LLC)
- Sister stations: WFKL, WRMM-FM

History
- First air date: April 11, 1997
- Former call signs: WAQB (1997)
- Call sign meaning: "Zone"

Technical information
- Licensing authority: FCC
- Facility ID: 6859
- Class: A
- ERP: 1,800 watts
- HAAT: 124 meters (407 ft)
- Transmitter coordinates: 43°08′7.00″N 77°35′7.00″W

Links
- Public license information: Public file; LMS
- Webcast: Listen live
- Website: thezone941.com

WZNE (94.1 FM, "94.1 The Zone") is a commercial alternative rock radio station licensed to Brighton, New York, serving the Rochester metro area. WZNE is owned by the Stephens Media Group. Its studios are located in Rochester and its transmitter is located on Pinnacle Hill in Brighton. In addition to a standard analog transmission, WZNE broadcasts over two HD Radio channels, and is available online.

== History ==
The 94.1 FM frequency signed on the air in March 1997 under the originally assigned calls of WAQB, and with a stunt of instrumentals of rock songs while testing its signal. At 5:35 p.m. on April 11, 1997, 94.1 would officially launch with its current call letters and a Modern AC format as "94.1 the Zone". The first song on "The Zone" was "Head Over Feet" by Alanis Morissette. The station was first under the ownership of American Radio Systems, which would be bought out by Infinity Broadcasting in September 1997 (Infinity became CBS Radio in December 2005). Artists featured on the station during its early years included Blues Traveler, Dave Matthews Band, Alanis Morissette, Natalie Merchant, Talking Heads, 10,000 Maniacs, and U2.

In March 2001, WZNE would evolve to its current alternative rock format. In 2006, the station began airing the syndicated Rover's Morning Glory, which it would carry until 2020 when the show moved to WAIO. WZNE then began carrying the syndicated Jubal Show in November 2020, but dropped it in 2023 in favor of a local morning show.

When Entercom Communications closed on its purchase of WZNE and its cluster of sister stations from CBS on November 30, 2007, the company ended up with eight FM radio stations in Rochester, which was three stations over the FCC-mandated single-market ownership limit of five FM radio stations in a medium-to-large radio market. As a result, Entercom put WZNE, along with WFKL and WRMM-FM, back on the market. In early May 2008, the Stephens Media Group of Tulsa, Oklahoma agreed to purchase the three stations, subject to FCC regulatory approval. Shortly after the acquisition was announced, Stephens took over the operation of the three stations through a time-brokerage agreement. The deal closed on July 14, 2008.

== Bonzai ==
Bonzai was the Zone's Annual summer festival Show. The show started in 2009 at The Riverside Festival Grounds in downtown Rochester, where it stayed for two years. In 2011, the show moved to the larger venue of the Monroe County Fairgrounds. In 2012 it was held at the Highland Bowl. In 2013, it was held at the Main Street Armory, with two stages, one indoors and one outside. In 2014, it was held at Sahlen's Stadium. In 2015, it was moved back to the Main Street Armory. For unknown reasons, Bonzai was discontinued after 2015.

Bonzai 2009 Lineup: The Gay Blades, Smile Empty Soul, Sick Puppies, Street Sweeper Social Club, Sevendust, Framing Hanley, and Tantric
Bonzai 2010 Lineup: New Politics, Crash Kings, Flyleaf, Ed Kowalczyck, Sick Puppies, Hollywood Undead, and Cage The Elephant
Bonzai 2011 Lineup: Airborne Toxic Event, Bayside, Bush, Hollywood Undead, Manchester Orchestra, Puddle of Mudd, and Sleeper Agent
Bonzai 2012 Lineup: Oberhofer, Walk the Moon, The Gaslight Anthem, Eve 6, Our Lady Peace, and The Offspring
Bonzai 2013 Lineup: 10 Years, Crash Kings, Diamond Youth, Dropkick Murphys, Family of the Year, IAmDynamite, Panic! At The Disco, Pepper, Sick Puppies, Reel Big Fish
Bonzai 2014 Lineup: Chevelle, A Day To Remember, J Roddy Walston and the Business, Big Data, Tove Lo, and Joywave
Bonzai 2015 Lineup: Rise Against, Meg Myers, Islander, and Night Riots

== Rover's Holiday Hangover ==
The Zone and Rover's Morning Glory's annual winter concert at the Main Street Armory began in 2012.

Rover's Holiday Hangover 2012 Lineup:Everlast, Four Year Strong, New Found Glory, and Young Bloods
Rover's Holiday Hangover 2013 Lineup: Dirty Heads, Hoobastank, New Politics, Twenty One Pilots, Churchill, and 1916
Rover's Holiday Hangover 2014 Lineup: Switchfoot, Manchester Orchestra, Blue October, J Roddy Walston & The Business, and Man Man
Rover's Holiday Hangover 2015 Lineup: WALK THE MOON, Alien Ant Farm, Kongos, My Goodness, New Politics
Rover's Holiday Hangover 2016 Lineup: New Politics, Andrew McMahon in the Wilderness, Joywave, and Coleman Hell
Rover's Holiday Hangover 2017 Lineup: Grouplove, Phantogram, Judah & The Lion, Bleeker, and The Unlikely Candidates
Rover's Holiday Hangover 2018 Lineup: Dashboard Confessional, The Struts, The Glorious Sons, and Welshly Arms
Rover's Holiday Hangover 2019 Lineup: Young The Giant, Lovelytheband, grandson, and The Interrupters
Rover's Holiday Hangover 2020 Lineup: AJR, Joywave, Dreamers, and Sub Urban

== See also ==
- Dalton Castle (wrestler) who worked for the station in 2011
