= WPXY-FM =

Contemporary hit radio station in Rochester, New York

- Rochester, New York; United States
- Broadcast area: Rochester metropolitan area
- Frequency: 97.9 MHz (HD Radio)
- Branding: 98PXY

Programming
- Language: English
- Format: Contemporary hit radio
- Subchannels: HD2: Channel Q
- Affiliations: Westwood One

Ownership
- Owner: Audacy, Inc.; (Audacy License, LLC)
- Sister stations: WBEE-FM; WBZA; WCMF-FM; WROC

History
- First air date: September 14, 1959
- Former call signs: WVET-FM (1959–1961); WROC-FM (1961–1975); WPXY (1975–1983)
- Call sign meaning: "Pixy" (reference to former beautiful music format)

Technical information
- Licensing authority: FCC
- Facility ID: 53966
- Class: B
- ERP: 50,000 watts
- HAAT: 142 meters (466 ft)
- Transmitter coordinates: 43.135°N 77.585°W

Links
- Public license information: Public file; LMS
- Webcast: Listen live (via Audacy); Listen live (via iHeartRadio)
- Website: www.audacy.com/98pxy

WPXY-FM (97.9 MHz, "98PXY") is a heritage commercial contemporary hit radio station licensed to Rochester, New York. Its transmitter is located on Pinnacle Hill in Brighton, and its studios are located at High Falls Studios in Downtown Rochester. WPXY also broadcasts on HD Radio, and includes a secondary subchannel, known as "Channel Q", which carries an LGBTQ+–oriented talk/EDM format.

== History ==
WPXY-FM signed on the air on September 14, 1959, as WVET-FM, the FM sister to WVET (1280 AM). It first aired classical music, before flipping to an automated beautiful music format. In addition to being an FM sister, WVET-FM was also a sister station to WVET-TV, and was originally under the ownership of Veterans Broadcasting. Veterans changed the station's call sign to WROC-FM in 1961, and sold the WROC stations (which included WROC-TV) to Rust Craft Broadcasting in 1964, before being sold to Associated Broadcasters, which later became part of Pyramid Broadcasting. Due to the ownership split, in 1975, WROC-FM became WPXY, and was known as "Pixie" (hence the "PXY" call letters). (WROC would become WPXN). WPXY flipped to its current Top 40/CHR format in September 1983. The station began broadcasting Rick Dees Weekly Top 40 in November 1983 (until late 1988) and American Top 40 with Casey Kasem in March 1987.

WPXY would begin simulcasting on its AM sister station in September 1983, with the simulcast running until 1991, when the AM would flip to standards, and then oldies, before returning to a simulcast in 1992, and then splitting again a year later. (The AM changed its call sign to WHTK, and would be sold off to Jacor in 1996).

The Lincoln Group would purchase the station from Pyramid in late 1993. Lincoln would then merge with American Radio Systems in February 1996, with ARS merging with Infinity Broadcasting in September 1997. (Infinity would be renamed CBS Radio in December 2005). CBS sold WPXY-FM to Entercom Communications on November 30, 2007.

=== 98 PXY ===
Scott Spezzano was the morning voice of 98 PXY for over 25 years & is one of the most recognized celebrities in the Rochester Community. For years, Spezzano would climb atop the roof of Marketplace Mall the weekend after Thanksgiving and broadcast live, living on the roof for 57 hours to raise money for the Salvation Army Homeless Holiday Campaign. This "stunt" for years was called the 98 PXY Help the Homeless Weekend or just simply "The Roof-Sit". Community members and business owners every year pledged their support of Spezzano, the only brave celebrity locally to attempt stunts like this for the community.

Spezzano, in his over 30 years on Rochester radio, has been honored many times for his charitable contributions and always giving back to the community, and remains a household name in the Rochester Community. On September 7, 2014, it was announced that Spezzano and Sandy Waters would be moving to sister station WBZA. Megan Carter, along with Corey James (former PXY alumni Corey Kincaid), took over the PXY morning show beginning on Friday, September 12, 2014, with a special duel simulcast including Spezzano and Sandy with special guests on both WPXY and WBZA. Their show was called #TeamPXY with Carter + Corey.

Carter + Corey continued until early 2018, when Megan Carter exited the station. Whitney Young (who had been doing the midday shift) was promoted to co-host with Corey. However, Young's time at PXY did not last long, departing before the end of her first contract. Young was replaced by Brianna 'Breezy' Sloth.

Another popular personality on 98PXY is Chris Debbins, known simply as 'Debbins'. Debbins has been with the station since 2014, and currently hosts the afternoon drive show from 3 pm - 7pm.

Throughout the years, 98PXY has put on many fun events including the High School Challenge, a penny drive where Rochester area High Schools competed to collect the most pennies. The winner got a free concert at their school by a national recording artist. The proceeds benefited various Hillside agencies. Artists that performed include Donnie Klang, Boys Like Girls, O-Town, and more...with Justin Bieber being the draw in 2009.

WPXY was the first station to air Rochester native Teddy Geiger's single "For You I Will (Confidence)". Teddy mentions the station inside the cover of her (then his) hit album Underage Thinking.

WPXY began streaming worldwide online at 98pxy.com on April 1, 2008.
