= WBEE-FM =

- Rochester, New York; United States
- Broadcast area: Rochester metro area
- Frequency: 92.5 MHz (HD Radio)
- Branding: 92.5 WBEE

Programming
- Language: English
- Format: Country music
- Subchannels: HD2: WROC simulcast (sports radio)

Ownership
- Owner: Audacy, Inc.; (Audacy License, LLC)
- Sister stations: WBZA; WCMF-FM; WPXY-FM; WROC

History
- First air date: February 14, 1961
- Former call signs: WBBF-FM (1961–69); WBFB (1969–76); WNWZ (1976–1977); WMJQ (1977–86); WLRY (1986–87)
- Former frequencies: 101.3 MHz (1961–1965)
- Call sign meaning: Honeybee

Technical information
- Licensing authority: FCC
- Facility ID: 71206
- Class: B
- ERP: 50,000 watts
- HAAT: 152 meters (499 ft)
- Transmitter coordinates: 43.177°N 77.477°W
- Translator: HD2: 95.7 W239BF (Rochester)

Links
- Public license information: Public file; LMS
- Webcast: Listen live (via Audacy)
- Website: www.audacy.com/wbee

WBEE-FM (92.5 MHz) is a commercial radio station in Rochester, New York. It airs a country music radio format and is owned by Audacy, Inc. (formerly Entercom Communications), after being acquired from Sinclair Broadcasting in 1999. The station's studios are located in downtown Rochester at Entercom's High Falls Studios, while its transmitter tower is off Five Mile Line Road in Penfield.

The station is usually #1 or #2 in listenership in the Rochester radio market according to Nielsen Audio. The station broadcasts in HD and airs the all-sports format from co-owned AM 950 WROC on its HD2 channel.

== History ==
The 92.5 MHz frequency in Rochester was first occupied in 1960, by WVOR, owned by the Functional Broadcasting Company. But within a couple of years, that station moved to 100.5 (home today to WDVI). In 1965, classical music station WBBF-FM moved to the unoccupied 92.5 frequency. WBBF-FM had already been established on February 14, 1961 on 101.3 as the sister station to popular AM outlet WBBF. The call letters were changed to WBFB in 1969.

In 1975, NBC Radio started a 24-hour all-news radio network called NIS (News and Information Service), with WBFB switching to join the NIS Network, becoming WNWZ, and donating its classical music library to WXXI-FM, which has remained a classical station ever since. However, the network was not profitable, and NBC announced it would be shut down at the end of 1976.

At the same time, the soft rock format had been catching on around the country, heard on stations such as WMGK in Philadelphia and WMJC in Detroit. LIN Broadcasting, which owned WNWZ at the time, decided to put a soft rock format on 92.5, calling the station WMJQ, as well as their branding "Magic 92". These stations played many of the same artists as were heard on album rock stations, but only their softer works. Over time, WMJQ moved to a more mainstream album rock direction, putting it in competition with Rochester's leading rock station WCMF, eventually WMJQ was renamed as "Rockradio 92MJQ".

By early 1983, WMJQ had shifted to more of a modern rock format, though continuing to play a lot of mainstream album rock artists, and used the slogan "Rock of The Eighties". The modern rock format had proved to be quite successful on KROQ-FM in Los Angeles and other stations around the country. However, in the late summer of 1983, LIN Broadcasting decided to make a switch; co-owned WBBF had given up its contemporary hit radio format for news-talk the previous year, as many AM stations were doing at the time. Capitalizing on this, WMJQ switched to a contemporary hit radio format on September 4, 1983, under their new nickname as "Hitradio Q92". (The Rochester market now had three FM contemporary hit radio stations (WPXY-FM had adopted a contemporary hit radio format the previous year, and WHFM (98.9 FM) had been contemporary hit radio leader since the late 1960s). Even after WHFM changed format in early 1985, WMJQ was in a difficult competitive position against format ratings-leader WPXY.

On April 2, 1987, WMJQ flipped to another format that was quickly becoming popular among FM radio stations at the time and began broadcasting country music as WBEE-FM. (The WMJQ call sign was then immediately acquired by what is now WBKV in Buffalo, who held the sign for the next decade). It used the FM suffix to its callsign because there was already an AM station, WBEE in Harvey, Illinois near Chicago, now known as WBGX.
