= WFKL =

Radio station in Fairport, New York

Coordinates: 43.177°N 77.477°W

- Fairport, New York; United States
- Broadcast area: Rochester metropolitan area
- Frequency: 93.3 MHz
- Branding: Fickle 93.3

Programming
- Format: Adult hits

Ownership
- Owner: Stephens Media Group
- Sister stations: WRMM-FM, WZNE

History
- First air date: 1993; 33 years ago (as WEZO in Avon)
- Former call signs: WXME (CP, 1990); WYNQ (CP, 1990–1993); WEZO (1993–1995); WHRR (1995–1996); WQRV (1996–2000); WBBF-FM (2000–2005)
- Call sign meaning: "Fickle" (branding)

Technical information
- Licensing authority: FCC
- Facility ID: 37824
- Class: A
- ERP: 4,400 watts
- HAAT: 117 meters (384 ft)

Links
- Public license information: Public file; LMS
- Webcast: Listen Live
- Website: fickle933.com

WFKL (93.3 MHz) is an FM radio station licensed to Fairport, New York, and serving the Rochester metropolitan area. The station, branded as "Fickle 93.3", broadcasts an adult hits radio format, or what the station refers to as "We Play Everything," similar to Jack FM. It is and owned by Stephens Media Group which also owns WRMM and WZNE. The studios are in the First Federal Plaza building in downtown Rochester.

WFKL has an effective radiated power (ERP) of 4,400 watts. The transmitter is off Five Mile Line Road in Penfield, New York.

== History ==
The station got its construction permit from the Federal Communications Commission in 1990. Before it was on the air, it was given the call sign WXME and was licensed to Avon, New York. The first owner was Karen S. Klehamer. In 1993, it signed on the air as WEZO, playing an easy listening format. At that time it was owned by The Lincoln Group L.P.

In May 1995, WEZO switched to classic rock as WHRR "The River". In 2000, owner Entercom Communications moved the legacy WBBF call letters and intellectual property to the station from WBZA and it became an oldies station as "Oldies 93.3" and later "93BBF". In April 2005, the station was flipped to variety hits becoming Fickle 93.3.

The station was sold by Entercom to Stephens Media Group when Entercom Communications closed on its purchase a cluster of stations from CBS Radio on November 30, 2007, the company ended up with eight FM radio stations in Rochester, which was three stations over the FCC-mandated single-market ownership limit of five FM radio stations in a medium-to-large radio market. As a result, Entercom put WFKL on the market and WZNE and WRMM-FM, back on the market. In early May 2008, Stephens Media Group agreed to purchase the three stations, subject to FCC regulatory approval. Shortly after the acquisition was announced, Stephens took over the operation of the three stations through a time-brokerage agreement. The deal closed on July 14, 2008.
