= WNBL (FM) =

- South Bristol, New York; United States
- Broadcast area: Rochester metropolitan area
- Frequency: 107.3 MHz (HD Radio)
- Branding: Big 107.3

Programming
- Format: 1980's hits
- Affiliations: Premiere Networks; Rochester Knighthawks

Ownership
- Owner: iHeartMedia; (iHM Licenses, LLC)
- Sister stations: WAIO; WDVI; WHAM; WHTK; WKGS; WVOR

History
- First air date: January 22, 1996; 30 years ago
- Former call signs: WFUD (1991–1994, CP); WRCD (1994–1998); WMAX-FM (1998–1999); WLCL (1999–2003); WFXF (2003–2004); WNVE (2004–2006); WSNP (2006–2007); WCRR (2007–2009); WROO (3/2009–9/2009); WHTK-FM (2009–2012); WODX (2012–2014)
- Call sign meaning: Western New York Bull (former station branding)

Technical information
- Licensing authority: FCC
- Facility ID: 27580
- Class: A
- ERP: 650 watts
- HAAT: 303 meters (994 ft)
- Transmitter coordinates: 42°7′46″N 77°4′26″W

Links
- Public license information: Public file; LMS
- Webcast: Listen live (via iHeartRadio)
- Website: big1073.iheart.com

WNBL (107.3 MHz) is a commercial FM radio station licensed to South Bristol, New York, and serving the Rochester metropolitan area. It is owned by iHeartMedia and airs an 1980s' hits radio format, known as Big 107.3. WNBL is a Class A station, operating at 650 watts. WNBL's transmitter is in South Bristol, New York, near the Bristol Mountain Ski Resort. The station's studios and offices are on Chestnut Street in Rochester, at Five Star Bank Plaza.

In addition to its 80's music format WNBL also carries Rochester Knighthawks games.

== History ==
=== Early years as Smooth Jazz and Rhythmic CHR ===
The station now known as WNBL was granted a construction permit in 1991, as WFUD. On January 26, 1996, it signed on as WRCD, licensed to Honeoye Falls. WRCD was a sister station to WMAX-FM (now WKGS), operating from the WMAX studios at 412 State Street in downtown Rochester and using a transmitter site in Bloomfield, on the southeastern edge of the Rochester market. Under original owner Auburn Cablevision, WRCD used a satellite-delivered smooth jazz format from Sony's SW programming service.

In 1997, Auburn Cablevision sold WMAX-FM and WRCD to Jacor Communications. On February 19, 1998, at midnight, Jacor rearranged the formats on its new acquisitions. WRCD's smooth jazz was replaced by a rhythmic contemporary format called "Jam'n 107.3." On March 1, 1998, WRCD changed its call sign to WMAX-FM, as the former WMAX-FM on 106.7 became WYSY.

=== Kiss 107, rhythmic oldies, '80s hits ===
The "Jam'n" branding and format gave way to a more mainstream Top 40 format as "Kiss 107" in December 1998. In 1999, Clear Channel Communications (now iHeartMedia) bought the station. On April 30, 1999, Clear Channel moved "Kiss" down the dial to 106.7, which changed its call sign from WYSY to WKGS. 107.3 briefly stunting as "Big Cow Country", then flipped to rhythmic oldies on May 7, 1999, as "Jammin' Oldies", later modified to "Cool 107" under the new call sign WLCL, which took effect July 9, 1999.

In February 2000, WLCL changed format to 1980s' hits as "Channel 107.3". On September 3, 2001, WLCL began stunting with an all-ABBA format, returning the following week to rhythmic oldies. At the same time, Clear Channel was preparing to relocate the 107.3 facility to South Bristol as part of an upgrade to sister station WNVE on 95.1, which was changing city of license from South Bristol to Honeoye Falls to move its transmitter to Baker Hill, closer to Rochester. In January 2002, WLCL relocated its transmitter to the Bristol Mountain site built in 1948, for the Rural Radio Network and formerly used by WNVE. As a class A station from Bristol Mountain, WLCL's new signal in the Rochester market was relatively weak, though the station was well heard in most of the western Finger Lakes region.

=== The Fox and The Nerve ===
In December 2002, WLCL dropped the rhythmic oldies format and began stunting with Christmas music as "Rudolph Radio", then with two days of country music. On December 26, 2002, WLCL changed format to classic rock as "107.3 the Fox", taking new call sign WFXF on March 28, 2003.

On July 4, 2004, Clear Channel swapped formats and call letters between 95.1 and 107.3, sending classic rock WFXF to the stronger 95.1 signal and moving the WNVE call sign and "Nerve" modern rock format to the weaker 107.3 facility. The move followed Clear Channel's corporate decision to remove Howard Stern from its airwaves, which left WNVE without its main ratings draw.

=== Snap 107.3, country, and WHTK simulcast ===
Logo as WCRR/WROO "Country 107.3" (May 2007-September 2009)

On August 30, 2006, the Nerve was replaced with a "Wheel Of Formats" under the moniker "Huge 107.3", sponsored by local automobile dealership Fuccillo Hyundai (a nod to their longtime slogan, "It's HUGE!"). After six days of stunting, the station flipped to a rhythmic adult contemporary format known as "SNAP! 107.3". The station also picked up the nationally syndicated Wake Up with Whoopi for mornings, featuring comic-actress Whoopi Goldberg. The call sign was changed to WSNP on September 15, 2006.

On May 18, 2007, Clear Channel pulled the plug on the format and went to country music as "Country 107.3". On June 14, 2007, the call sign was changed to WCRR. On March 3, 2009, the callsign switched again to WROO, without any change in format or branding.

On September 9, 2009, at midnight, the callsign was changed to WHTK-FM, as an FM simulcast of sports radio WHTK. The move gave listeners who preferred FM radio a sports station and helped to cover areas in the Rochester market that WHTK (AM)'s signal could not, especially at night.

=== Oldies 107.3 ===
On May 5, 2012, WHTK-FM began stunting with a looped message directing listeners back to 1280 AM. On May 7 at 9 a.m., WHTK-FM launched an oldies format, branded as "Oldies 107.3". The call sign was changed to WODX. The first song as "Oldies 107.3" was Bob Seger's "Old Time Rock and Roll". The flip gave the Rochester market an oldies format for the first time since the demise of WBBF-FM in 2005, which flipped to variety hits as WFKL.

=== 107.3 The Bull ===
"107.3 The Bull" logo (2014–2022)

On September 11, 2014, at noon, after playing "It's the End of the World as We Know It (And I Feel Fine)" by R.E.M., WODX changed their format back to country music, branded as "107.3 The Bull" launching with 10,000 songs commercial free. The first song on "The Bull" was "Roller Coaster" by Luke Bryan. The station's call sign were changed to WNBL on September 18. The nationally syndicated Bobby Bones Show from Nashville debuted on the station on October 13, 2014, and aired Monday through Saturday mornings. On October 25, 2021, iHeartMedia flipped sister station WDVI from adult contemporary to country and moved The Bobby Bones Show to that station, however, it remained being simulcasted on WNBL. For a time, both WNBL and WDVI played an almost identical country format in an unusual situation where two stations under common ownership, and in the same market, were playing the same format (though as a rimshot in the western Finger Lakes, WNBL targeted a more rural audience whereas WDVI was more centrally located; iHeart's predecessor Clear Channel had programmed WDVI and another Finger Lakes station—102.3, then-WISY—with similar adult-contemporary formats in years past, with both stations alternating the WVOR calls that are now carried on the latter).

=== Big 107.3 ===
After 8 months of both WNBL and WDVI playing an almost identical country format, on July 1, 2022, at midnight, after playing "Heart Like a Truck" by Lainey Wilson, WNBL flipped back to 1980s' hits as "Big 107.3". The first song on "Big" was "Flashdance... What a Feeling" by Irene Cara. The move directly challenged Audacy's WBZA, as well as WFKL, which plays similar music as part of its variety hits format. As Big 107.3, WNBL carries Valentine in the Morning hosted by Sean Valentine from KBIG Los Angeles in morning drive, and The Martha Quinn Show middays.

WNBL's transmitter site in South Bristol. The site was originally built for the Rural Radio Network.

== HD Radio ==
The HD2 signal of the station carries a Christmas R&B format, branded as "iHeartChristmas R&B".
