= WHTK (AM) =

- Rochester, New York; United States
- Broadcast area: Rochester metropolitan area
- Frequency: 1280 kHz
- Branding: Fox Sports 1280 Rochester

Programming
- Language: English
- Format: Sports radio
- Affiliations: Fox Sports Radio; Westwood One; Buffalo Bills Radio Network; New York Jets; RIT Tigers men's ice hockey; Rochester Red Wings

Ownership
- Owner: iHeartMedia; (iHM Licenses, LLC)
- Sister stations: WAIO, WDVI, WHAM, WKGS, WNBL, WVOR

History
- First air date: 1947; 79 years ago
- Former call signs: WVET (1947–1961); WROC (1961–1979); WPXN (1979–1984); WPXY (1984–1991); WKQG (1991–1992); WPXY (1992–1993)
- Call sign meaning: Hot Talk (former format)

Technical information
- Licensing authority: FCC
- Facility ID: 37549
- Class: B
- Power: 5,000 watts
- Transmitter coordinates: 43°5′54.00″N 77°35′1.00″W

Links
- Public license information: Public file; LMS
- Webcast: Listen live (via iHeartRadio)
- Website: foxsports1280.iheart.com

WHTK (1280 kHz) is an AM radio station broadcasting a sports radio format. Licensed to Rochester, New York, and serving the Rochester area, the station is owned by iHeartMedia. Its studios are located at the Five Star Bank Plaza building on Chestnut Street downtown Rochester while its transmitter is located in Brighton. It features programming from Fox Sports Radio. WHTK carries the New York Jets, Rochester Red Wings, and RIT Tigers Men's Ice Hockey among other local and national sports. The station's weekday lineup includes The Dan Patrick Show, The Herd with Colin Cowherd, One Bills Live, and a local show hosted by John DiTullio.

== History ==
logo through 2008

The station was first known as WVET, signing on in 1947, under ownership of a group of returning World War II veterans calling themselves Veterans' Broadcasting Company. It operated successfully for many years with a personality full service adult popular music format. It changed call sign from WVET to WROC when Veterans bought WROC-TV from Transcontinent Television Corporation in 1961. Simultaneously, an FM sister station, WROC-FM, signed on, first playing classical music and later automated jazz and pop standards. Veterans sold the WROC radio stations in 1964 to Rust Craft Broadcasting, who then sold the stations to Associated Broadcasters (which later became Pyramid Broadcasting) in 1979. The AM station continued with its full service format until late in the 1970s, when it tried an all-news format first as WROC and then as WPXN. It later changed calls letters to WPXY and aired the satellite-fed "Music of Your Life" adult standards format before dropping that in January 1984 for a simulcast with its FM sister station, by the early 1980s known as WPXY-FM and airing a contemporary hit music format, which WPXY-FM still runs today. In 1990, the AM split from the simulcast and returned to Music of Your Life. In 1991, WPXY (AM) changed to oldies as WKQG, then back to a simulcast with the FM (again as WPXY).

On November 1, 1993, after The Lincoln Group began to operate the station from Pyramid (who kept the FM), it flipped to mostly syndicated "hot talk", a lineup of talk and sports programming meant to appeal to young adult men branding itself as "Hot Talk 1280". At that time, it adopted the WHTK call sign (the "HTK" meant to stand for "hot talk") which it still uses today. Over the next few years, the station added more sports-oriented programming. In 1996, WHTK was split from WPXY-FM permanently when the station was sold to Jacor (after several subsequent mergers, Clear Channel Communications (now iHeartMedia) acquired the station in 2000).

In 2008, the station re-branded itself as "Sportsradio 1280". As of 2014, the station is now known as "FOX Sports 1280 Rochester".

WHTK was the longtime radio home of the Rochester Americans of the American Hockey League. The Americans jumped to WROC in 2016 as a result of a five-year deal between Pegula Sports and Entertainment (the Americans' owners) and Entercom.

=== WHTK-FM ===
On September 9, 2009, at midnight, WROO changed callsigns to WHTK-FM and changed their format from country music, as "Country 107.3" to sports, simulcasting WHTK 1280 AM, as "1280 WHTK & FM 107.3." The change was made to address nighttime signal limitations of WHTK (AM), which must protect co-channel signals in New York City and the midwestern US by using a directional antenna after sunset. The FM station filled in signal nulls which limited WHTK's nighttime and early morning reach in southeastern Monroe County, southern Wayne County and Ontario County. The FM simulcast ended on May 5, 2012.
